= Kelly v. United States =

- Supreme Court of the United States

Argued January 14, 2020 Decided May 7, 2020
- Full case name: Bridget Anne Kelly, Petitioner v. United States
- Docket no.: 18-1059
- Citations: 590 U.S. 391 (more) 140 S. Ct. 1565
- Argument: Oral argument
- Decision: Opinion

Case history
- Prior: Motions to dismiss denied, United States v. Baroni, No. 2:15-CR-00193, 2016 WL 3388302 (D.N.J. June 13, 2016); Motions for judgment of acquittal and for new trial denied, United States v. Baroni, No. 2:15-CR-00193, 2017 WL 787122 (D.N.J. Mar. 1, 2017); Affirmed in part, vacated in part, and remanded, 909 F.3d 550 (3d Cir. 2018); Cert. granted sub. nom. Kelly v. United States, 139 S. Ct. 2777 (2019)

Holding
- Because the scheme here did not aim to obtain money or property, Baroni and Kelly could not have violated the federal-program fraud or wire fraud laws.

Court membership
- Chief Justice John Roberts Associate Justices Clarence Thomas · Ruth Bader Ginsburg; Stephen Breyer · Samuel Alito; Sonia Sotomayor · Elena Kagan; Neil Gorsuch · Brett Kavanaugh

Case opinion
- Majority: Kagan, joined by unanimous

Kelly v. United States, 590 U.S. 391 (2020), was a United States Supreme Court case involving the 2013 Fort Lee lane closure scandal, also known as "Bridgegate". The case centered on whether Bridget Anne Kelly, the chief of staff to New Jersey Governor Chris Christie who was running for reelection at the time, and Bill Baroni, the Deputy Executive Director of the Port Authority of New York and New Jersey, improperly used lane closures on the George Washington Bridge to create traffic jams as a means of retaliation against Mark Sokolich, the mayor of Fort Lee, New Jersey, when he refused to support Christie's reelection campaign. While lower courts had convicted Kelly and Baroni on federal fraud, wire fraud and conspiracy charges, the Supreme Court unanimously overturned the convictions in its May 2020 ruling, stating that such charges could not apply as "the scheme here did not aim to obtain money or property", and remanded their cases back to the lower courts.

== Background ==
During New Jersey Governor's Chris Christie's 2013 reelection campaign, he sought support from the mayors of several New Jersey cities. While several backed the Republican governor for reelection, the mayor of Fort Lee, New Jersey, Mark Sokolich, a Democrat, refused to provide his support. As asserted by prosecutors in the legal cases that followed, Christie's deputy chief of staff Bridget Anne Kelly contacted through email Bill Baroni, the Deputy Executive Director of the Port Authority of New York and New Jersey, and David Wildstein, the director of interstate capital projects at the Port Authority, to suggest they create traffic problems for Fort Lee in retaliation for Sokolich's refusal and coerce his support. Over a period of four days starting on the first school day that year, September 9, 2013, the Port Authority shut down two of three lanes of traffic from Fort Lee onto the George Washington Bridge into New York City without any notice, causing major traffic jams, and later justified the lane closures as a traffic study. Local media began investigating the closure and discovered the email communications between Kelly, Baroni, and Wildstein that demonstrated the political collusion in the closures.

As the emails suggested there was a potential federal crime, several investigations were launched in 2014 by the New Jersey Legislature, the Port Authority, United States Attorney for the District of New Jersey Paul J. Fishman and the United States Senate Committee on Commerce, Science and Transportation. Fishman's investigation led to the indictments issued against Kelly and Baroni in May 2015 on charges of conspiracy and fraud; Wildstein, who had been convicted earlier, had agreed to testify against the two as part of a plea bargain. The jury trial concluded in November 2016 with Kelly and Baroni found guilty on all nine charges of fraud and conspiracy. Kelly was sentenced to 18 months of prison while Baroni to 24 months, with both serving 500 hours of community service. Wildstein, in a separate trial, was also convicted and sentenced to three years in prison and 500 hours of community service.

Both Baroni and Kelly appealed to the U.S. Court of Appeals for the Third Circuit. In November 2018, the Third Circuit upheld a majority of the convictions, though it reversed the charge that they had violated the civil rights of travelers, which the Appeals Court ruled was not an established right. Both received reduced sentences; Baroni's to 18 months and Kelly's to 13 months, and Kelly additionally ordered to pay US$14,000 to New Jersey as restitution for the lost toll revenue.

== Supreme Court ==
=== Petition ===
Kelly petitioned to the Supreme Court after the Third Circuit's decision upholding the jury's convictions. Kelly's petition asked the question "Does a public official 'defraud' the government of its property by advancing a 'public policy reason' for an official decision that is not her subjective 'real reason' for making the decision?" The Court accepted to hear Kelly's case on June 28, 2019. Legal analysts believed that this signaled a likelihood the Court would overturn the conviction as it had followed a number of similar cases of reversals or overturning of convictions of high-level state and federal officials on federal fraud charges due to the lack of evidence to demonstrate corruption or fraud.

=== Oral arguments ===
Oral arguments for the case were heard on January 14, 2020. Court observers found that there was no discernible pattern to how the Justices questioned both sides of the case, making it difficult to determine how they would ultimately decide. Much of the questioning related to the authority that Kelly and Baroni had in ordering the lane changes, and what fraud, if any, would have occurred if this had been in their authority.

=== Decision ===
Justice Elena Kagan delivered the unanimous opinion of the Court on May 7, 2020, which overturned the immediate convictions against Kelly and Baroni. Kagan wrote that "[t]he question presented is whether the defendants committed property fraud." Kagan elaborated that the lane closures could be taken as "an exercise of regulatory power – a reallocation of the lanes between different groups of drivers", and that the prosecution in the case has failed to show that the actions taken by the government were an "object of fraud", as previously held in Pasquantino v. United States. Kagan concluded that "[b]ecause the scheme here did not aim to obtain money or property, [William] Baroni and Kelly could not have violated the federal-program fraud or wire fraud laws." The decision reversed the convictions and remanded the case to the lower courts for additional review based on the decision.
