= 2024 United States House of Representatives elections in New Jersey =

- November 5, 2024

All 12 New Jersey seats to the United States House of Representatives
- Turnout: 64.67% (▲23.67pp)
	Majority party	Minority party
Party	Democratic	Republican
Last election	9	3
Seats won	9	3
Seat change	Steady	Steady
Popular vote	2,115,843	1,828,853
Percentage	52.41%	45.30%
Swing	▼1.86%	▲0.84%

Democratic
40–50%
50–60%
60–70%
70–80%
Republican
50–60%
60–70%

The 2024 United States House of Representatives elections in New Jersey were held on November 5, 2024, to elect the twelve U.S. representatives from the State of New Jersey, one from all twelve of the state's congressional districts. The elections coincided with the 2024 U.S. presidential election, as well as other elections to the House of Representatives, elections to the United States Senate, and various state and local elections. The primary elections were held on June 4, 2024.

== Overview ==
=== Statewide ===
Party	Candi- dates	Votes		Seats		
Party	Candi- dates	No.	%	No.	+/–	%
Democratic Party	12	2,115,843	52.41%	9	Steady	75%
Republican Party	12	1,828,853	45.30%	3	Steady	25%
Green Party	12	48,683	1.21%	0	Steady	0%
Independent	10	22,985	0.57%	0	Steady	0%
Libertarian Party	7	18,343	0.45%	0	Steady	0%
Socialist Workers Party	1	2,419	0.06%	0	Steady	0%
Total	54	4,037,126	100%	12	Steady	100%

Popular vote
Democratic	52.41%
Republican	45.30%
Other	2.23%

House seats
Democratic	75.00%
Republican	25.00%

=== District ===
District	Democratic		Republican		Others		Total		Result
District	Votes	%	Votes	%	Votes	%	Votes	%	Result
District 1	208,808	57.83%	144,390	39.99%	7,862	2.18%	361,060	100.0%	Democratic hold
District 2	153,117	41.20%	215,946	58.11%	2,557	0.69%	371,620	100.0%	Republican hold
District 3	202,034	53.24%	169,454	44.65%	7,996	2.11%	379,484	100.0%	Democratic hold
District 4	124,803	31.66%	265,652	67.39%	3,773	0.96%	394,228	100.0%	Republican hold
District 5	208,359	54.56%	165,287	43.28%	8,243	2.16%	381,889	100.0%	Democratic hold
District 6	170,275	56.07%	122,519	40.34%	10,887	3.59%	303,681	100.0%	Democratic hold
District 7	200,025	46.37%	223,331	51.77%	8,042	1.86%	431,398	100.0%	Republican hold
District 8	116,434	59.17%	68,152	34.64%	9,760	4.96%	196,765	100.0%	Democratic hold
District 9	130,514	50.78%	117,939	45.89%	8,560	3.33%	257,013	100.0%	Democratic hold
District 10	182,020	74.42%	54,405	22.24%	8,152	3.33%	244,577	100.0%	Democratic hold
District 11	222,583	56.53%	164,556	41.79%	6,612	1.68%	393,751	100.0%	Democratic hold
District 12	196,871	61.20%	117,222	36.44%	7,567	2.35%	321,660	100.0%	Democratic hold
Total	2,115,843	52.41%	1,828,853	45.30%	90,011	2.23%	4,037,126	100.0%	

== District 1 ==
2024 New Jersey's 1st congressional district election
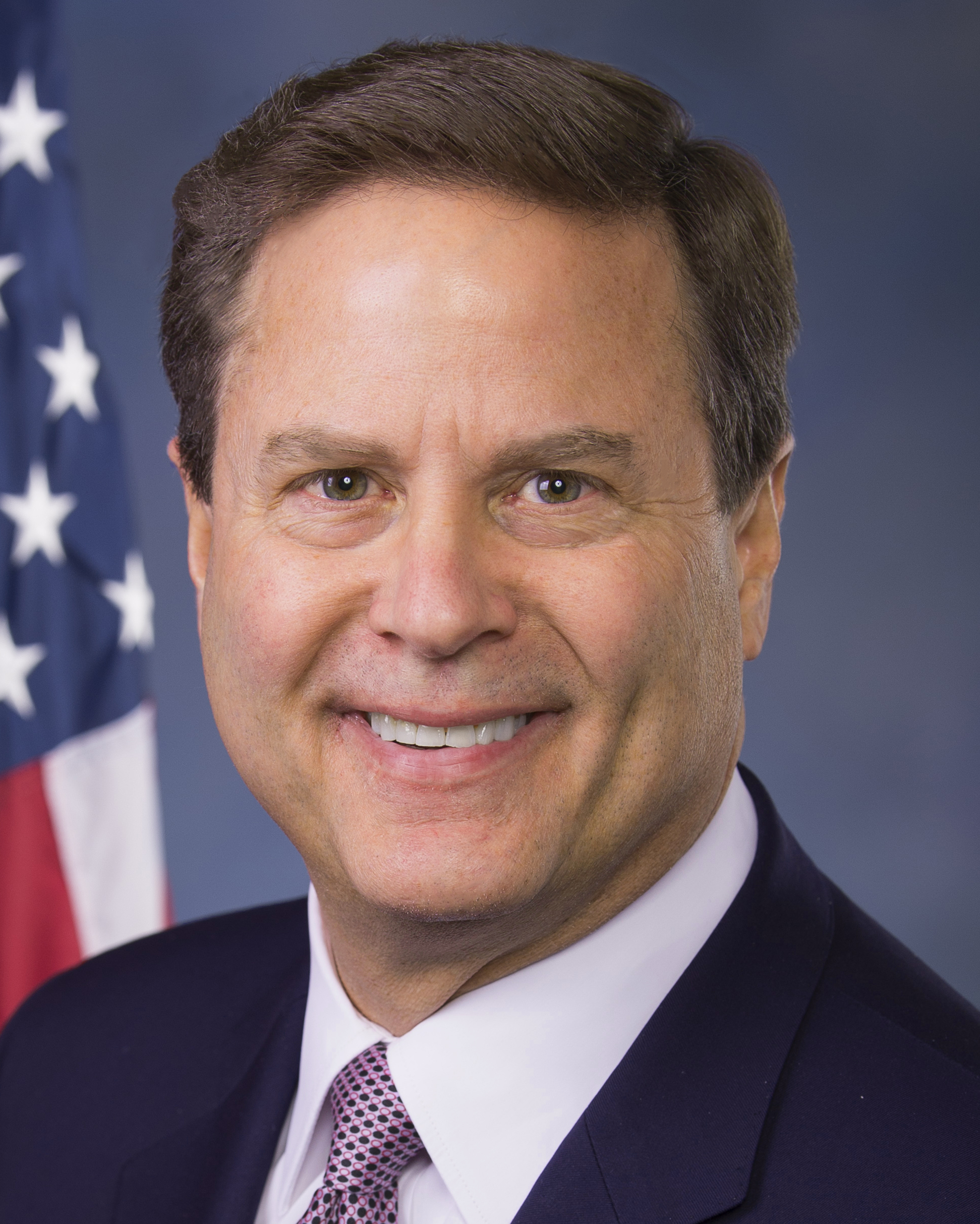

Nominee	Donald Norcross	Teddy Liddell
Party	Democratic	Republican
Popular vote	208,808	144,390
Percentage	57.8%	40.0%
- Norcross: 40–50% 50–60% 60–70% 70–80% 80–90% Liddell: 50–60% 60–70% 70–80%
U.S. Representative before election
Donald Norcross
Democratic
Elected U.S. Representative
Donald Norcross
Democratic

The 1st district consists of the South Jersey suburbs of Philadelphia, including the municipalities of Camden and Cherry Hill. The incumbent was Democrat Donald Norcross, who was re-elected with 62.3% of the vote in 2022.

=== Democratic primary ===
==== Nominee ====
- Donald Norcross, incumbent U.S. representative

==== Endorsements ====
Donald Norcross

Political parties

- Burlington County Democratic Party

Organizations

- AIPAC
- Democratic Majority for Israel
- Humane Society Legislative Fund
- Pro-Israel America

Labor unions

- Association of Flight Attendants
- Association of Professional Flight Attendants
- National Education Association

==== Fundraising ====
Campaign finance reports as of May 15, 2024
Candidate	Raised	Spent	Cash on hand
Donald Norcross (D)	$1,593,165	$420,620	$1,729,492
Source: Federal Election Commission

==== Results ====
Democratic primary results
Party	Candidate	Votes	%
Democratic	Donald Norcross (incumbent)	61,308	100.0
Total votes		61,308	100.0

=== Republican primary ===
==== Nominee ====
- Teddy Liddell, attorney and perennial candidate

==== Eliminated in primary ====
- Damon Galdo, construction superintendent and candidate for this district in 2022
- Claire Gustafson, businesswoman, former Collingswood school board member, and nominee for this district in 2020 and 2022

==== Endorsements ====
Damon Galdo

State legislators

- Edward Durr, former state senator from the 3rd district (2022–2024)
Claire Gustafson

Political parties

- Gloucester County Republican Party
Teddy Liddell

Political parties

- Camden County Republican Party

==== Fundraising ====
Campaign finance reports as of May 15, 2024
Candidate	Raised	Spent	Cash on hand
Damon Galdo (R)	$16,328 (Note: $2,500 of this total was self-funded by Galdo)	$14,350	$2,193
Teddy Liddell (R)	$4,790	$3,664	$1,125
Source: Federal Election Commission

==== Results ====
Republican primary results
Party	Candidate	Votes	%
Republican	Teddy Liddell	10,843	47.3
Republican	Claire Gustafson	8,687	37.9
Republican	Damon Galdo	3,410	14.9
Total votes		22,940	100.0

=== General election ===
==== Predictions ====
Source	Ranking	As of
Cook Political Report	Solid D	March 21, 2024
Inside Elections	Solid D	September 15, 2023
Sabato's Crystal Ball	Safe D	September 26, 2023
Elections Daily	Safe D	September 7, 2023
CNalysis	Solid D	November 16, 2023
Decision Desk HQ	Safe D	October 7, 2024

==== Results ====
2024 New Jersey's 1st congressional district election
Party	Candidate	Votes	%
Democratic	Donald Norcross (incumbent)	208,808	57.8
Republican	Teddy Liddell	144,390	40.0
Green	Robin Brownfield	5,771	1.6
Independent	Austin Johnson	2,091	0.6
Total votes		361,060	100.0
Democratic hold			

==== By county ====
County	Donald Norcross Democratic		Teddy Liddell Republican		Various candidates Other parties		Margin		Total votes cast
County	#	%	#	%	#	%	#	%	Total votes cast
Burlington (part)	6,468	59.30%	4,168	38.21%	272	2.49%	2,300	21.09%	10,908
Camden	145,494	61.35%	85,323	35.98%	6,354	2.68%	60,171	25.37%	237,171
Gloucester (part)	56,846	50.19%	54,899	48.47%	1,518	1.34%	1,947	1.72%	113,263
Totals	208,808	57.79%	144,390	39.96%	8,144	2.25%	64,418	17.83%	361,342

== District 2 ==
2024 New Jersey's 2nd congressional district election
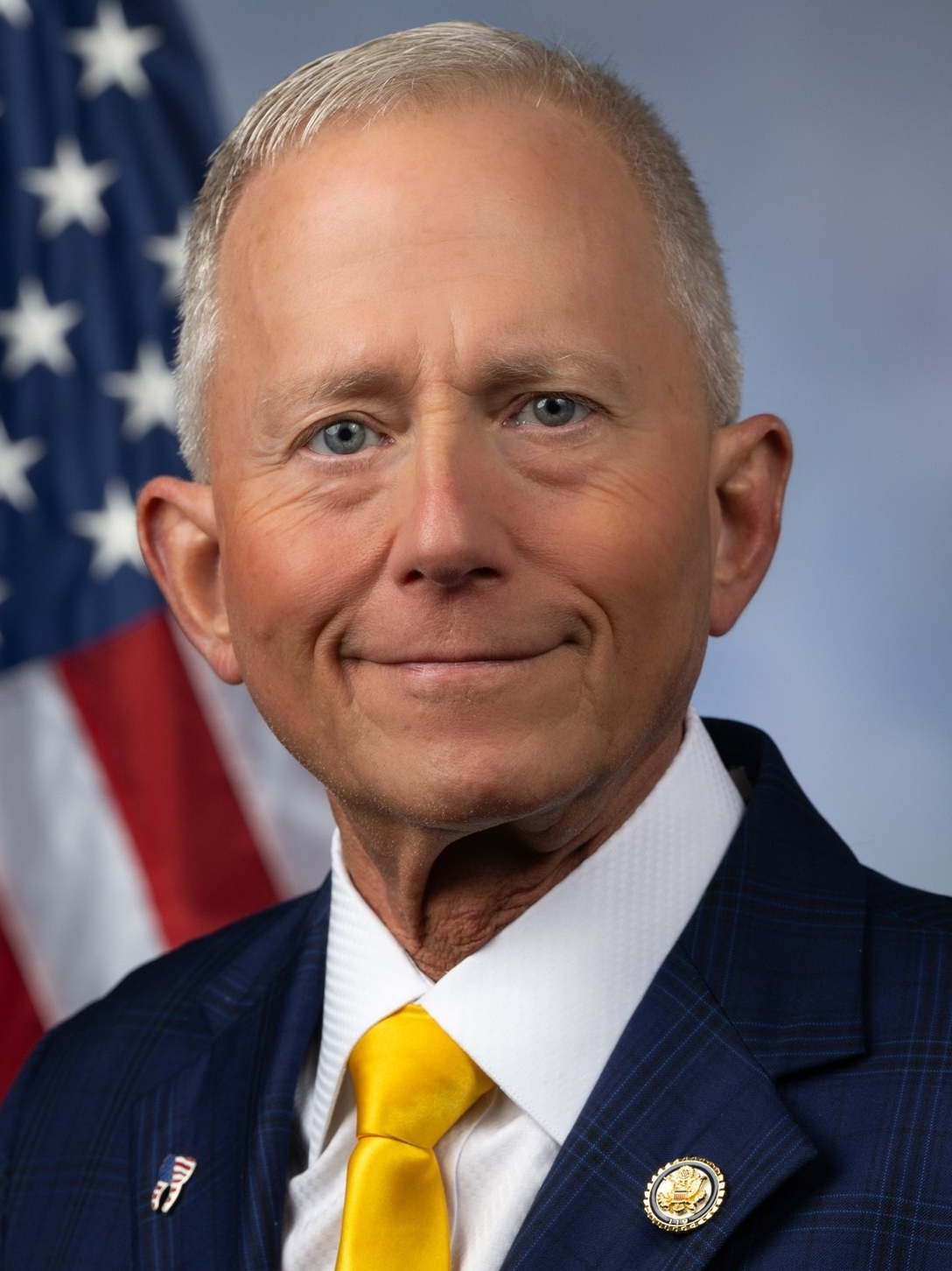

Nominee	Jeff Van Drew	Joe Salerno
Party	Republican	Democratic
Popular vote	215,946	153,117
Percentage	58.1%	41.2%
- Van Drew: 40–50% 50–60% 60–70% 70–80% 80–90% Salerno: 50–60% 60–70% 70–80%
U.S. Representative before election
Jeff Van Drew
Republican
Elected U.S. Representative
Jeff Van Drew
Republican

The 2nd district covers the majority of South Jersey, spanning from the Philadelphia metropolitan area to the upper Pine Barrens, taking in Atlantic City and Vineland. The incumbent was Republican Jeff Van Drew, who was re-elected with 58.9% of the vote in 2022.

=== Republican primary ===
==== Nominee ====
- Jeff Van Drew, incumbent U.S. representative

==== Endorsements ====
Jeff Van Drew

Political parties

- Atlantic County Republican Party
- Ocean County Republican Party

Organizations

- AIPAC

==== Fundraising ====
Campaign finance reports as of May 15, 2024
Candidate	Raised	Spent	Cash on hand
Jeff Van Drew (R)	$2,328,685	$1,779,341	$1,028,754
Source: Federal Election Commission

==== Results ====
Republican primary results
Party	Candidate	Votes	%
Republican	Jeff Van Drew (incumbent)	41,749	100.0
Total votes		41,749	100.0

=== Democratic primary ===
==== Nominee ====
- Joe Salerno, tech entrepreneur

==== Eliminated in primary ====
- Tim Alexander, civil rights attorney and nominee for this district in 2022
- Rodney Dean, activist
- Carolyn Rush, engineer and candidate for this district in 2022

==== Endorsements ====
Tim Alexander

Local officials

- Ernest Coursey, Atlantic County commissioner from the 1st district (2014–present)
- Donna Pearson, former Cumberland County commissioner
- Marty Small Sr., mayor of Atlantic City (2019–present)

Political parties

- Atlantic County Democratic Party
- Ocean County Democratic Party
- Salem County Democratic Party

Organizations

- National Organization for Women PAC
Carolyn Rush

Labor unions

- United Auto Workers
Brandon Saffold

Organizations

- Freethought Equality Fund
Joe Salerno

State legislators

- Edward H. Salmon, former state assemblyman from the 1st district (1988–1991)

County officials

- Darlene Barber, former Cumberland County commissioner
- Joseph Derella, former Cumberland County commissioner
- Caren Fitzpatrick, former at-large Atlantic County commissioner (2018–2024)
- Bruce Peterson, former Cumberland County commissioner

Party officials

- Steve Errickson, former Cumberland County Democratic chair
- Kevin McCann, Cumberland County Democratic chair

Organizations

- Vote Common Good

Labor unions

- International Association of Sheet Metal, Air, Rail and Transportation Workers
Declined to endorse

U.S. representatives

- Andy Kim, U.S. representative from New Jersey's 3rd congressional district (2019–present)

Political parties

- Cape May County Democratic Party
- Cumberland County Democratic Party

===== County Convention results =====
County Convention results

Ocean County Democratic Convention (March 10)
Party	Candidate	Votes	%
Democratic	Tim Alexander	51	67.1
Democratic	Joe Salerno	18	23.7
Democratic	Carolyn Rush	9	9.2
Total votes		76	100.0

Atlantic County Democratic Convention (March 17)
Party	Candidate	Votes	%
Democratic	Tim Alexander	122	57.8
Democratic	Joe Salerno	64	30.3
Democratic	Carolyn Rush	25	11.8
Total votes		211	100.0

Salem County Democratic Convention (March 23) (Note: This convention does not award a line)
Party	Candidate	Votes	%
Democratic	Tim Alexander	13	61.9
Democratic	Joe Salerno	6	28.6
Democratic	Carolyn Rush	2	9.5
Total votes		211	100.0

==== Fundraising ====
Campaign finance reports as of May 15, 2024
Candidate	Raised	Spent	Cash on hand
Tim Alexander (D)	$173,140 (Note: $10,000 of this total was self-funded by Alexander)	$170,004	$18,006
Carolyn Rush (D)	$124,539 (Note: $100,000 of this total was self-funded by Rush)	$28,507	$96,891
Joe Salerno (D)	$788,788 (Note: $453,277 of this total was self-funded by Salerno)	$543,348	$245,439
Source: Federal Election Commission

==== Results ====
Democratic primary results
Party	Candidate	Votes	%
Democratic	Joe Salerno	14,060	38.3
Democratic	Tim Alexander	13,621	37.1
Democratic	Carolyn Rush	7,836	21.3
Democratic	Rodney Dean	1,235	3.4
Total votes		36,752	100.0

=== General election ===
==== Predictions ====
Source	Ranking	As of
Cook Political Report	Solid R	March 21, 2024
Inside Elections	Solid R	May 9, 2024
Sabato's Crystal Ball	Safe R	September 26, 2023
Elections Daily	Safe R	September 7, 2023
CNalysis	Solid R	November 16, 2023
Decision Desk HQ	Likely R	October 7, 2024

==== Polling ====
Poll source	Date(s) administered	Sample size (Note: Key: A – all adults RV – registered voters LV – likely voters V – unclear)	Margin of error	Jeff Van Drew (R)	Joe Salerno (D)	Undecided
Global Strategy Group (D) (Note: Poll sponsored by Salerno's campaign)	August 5–8, 2024	400 (LV)	±4.9%	50%	42%	8%

==== Results ====
2024 New Jersey's 2nd congressional district election
Party	Candidate	Votes	%
Republican	Jeff Van Drew (incumbent)	215,946	58.1
Democratic	Joe Salerno	153,117	41.2
Green	Thomas Cannavo	2,557	0.7
Total votes		371,620	100.0
Republican hold			

==== By county ====
County	Jeff Van Drew Republican		Joe Salerno Democratic		Robin Brownfield Green		Margin		Total votes cast
County	#	%	#	%	#	%	#	%	Total votes cast
Atlantic	66,446	53.67%	56,453	45.60%	911	0.74%	9,993	8.07%	123,810
Cape May	33,347	63.24%	19,155	36.32%	233	0.44%	14,192	26.91%	52,735
Cumberland	28,336	53.44%	24,066	45.38%	627	1.18%	4,270	8.05%	53,029
Gloucester (part)	25,519	55.69%	20,002	43.65%	301	0.66%	5,517	12.04%	45,822
Ocean (part)	43,696	66.49%	21,708	33.03%	312	0.48%	21,988	33.46%	65,716
Salem	18,602	60.38%	11,733	38.09%	471	1.53%	6,869	22.30%	30,806
Totals	215,946	58.06%	153,117	41.17%	2,855	0.77%	62,829	16.89%	371,918

== District 3 ==
2024 New Jersey's 3rd congressional district election
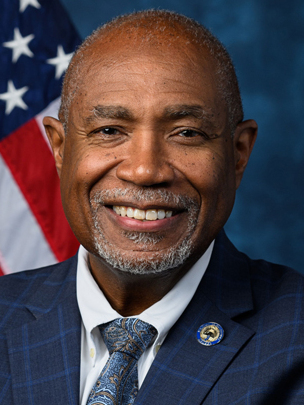

Nominee	Herb Conaway	Rajesh Mohan
Party	Democratic	Republican
Popular vote	202,034	169,454
Percentage	53.2%	44.7%
- Conaway: 50–60% 60–70% 70–80% 80–90% Mohan: 40–50% 50–60% 60–70% 70–80%
U.S. Representative before election
Andy Kim
Democratic
Elected U.S. Representative
Herb Conaway
Democratic

The 3rd district is centralized around much of Burlington County, taking in the suburbs of Philadelphia and Trenton as well as most of Freehold Township. The incumbent Democrat Andy Kim, who was re-elected with 55.5% of the vote in 2022, instead successfully ran for U.S. Senate from New Jersey.

=== Democratic primary ===
==== Nominee ====
- Herb Conaway, state assemblyman from the 7th district (1998–2025) and nominee for this district in 2004

==== Eliminated in primary ====
- Joe Cohn, legislation and policy director at the Foundation for Individual Rights and Expression
- Carol Murphy, state assemblywoman from the 7th district (2018–present)
- Brian Schkeeper, choir teacher
- Sarah Schoengood, sustainability officer and former intern for U.S. Representative Bonnie Watson Coleman

==== Declined ====
- Paula Sollami Covello, Mercer County Clerk (2006–present)
- Wayne DeAngelo, state assemblyman from the 14th district (2008–present)
- Andy Kim, incumbent U.S. representative (ran for U.S. Senate)
- Troy Singleton, state senator from the 7th district (2018–present)

==== Endorsements ====
Herb Conaway

U.S. representatives

- Gregory Meeks, NY-05 (1998–present)

State legislators

- Vin Gopal, state senator from the 11th district (2018–present)

Countywide officials

- James Kostoplis, Burlington County Sheriff
- Joanne Schwartz, Burlington County Clerk
- 3 Burlington County Commissioners

Party officials

- Joe Andl, Burlington County Democratic chair

Political parties

- Burlington County Democratic Party
- Mercer County Democratic Party
- Monmouth County Democratic Party

Organizations

- 314 Action
- Congressional Black Caucus
- Everytown for Gun Safety (post-primary)
- VoteVets
- With Honor Fund

Labor unions

- IUOE Local 825
- SEIU 32BJ
Carol Murphy

State legislators

- Andrea Katz, state assemblywoman from the 8th district (2024–present)

Organizations

- EMILY's List
- National Women's Political Caucus

Labor unions

- Eastern Atlantic States Regional Council of Carpenters
- IAFF Local 3091
- United Farm Workers

Newspapers

- The Philadelphia Inquirer
Declined to endorse

U.S. representatives

- Andy Kim, U.S. representative from New Jersey's 3rd congressional district (2019–present)

State legislators

- Troy Singleton, state senator from the 7th district (2018–present)

===== County Convention results =====
County Convention results

Monmouth County Democratic Convention (February 10)
Party	Candidate	Votes	%
Democratic	Herb Conaway	76	85.4
Democratic	Carol Murphy	13	14.6
Total votes		89	100.0

Burlington County Democratic Convention (February 24)
Party	Candidate	Votes	%
Democratic	Herb Conaway	179	70.5
Democratic	Carol Murphy	52	20.5
Democratic	Joe Cohn	15	5.9
Democratic	Sarah Schoengood	8	3.1
Total votes		254	100.0

Mercer County Democratic Convention (March 11)
Party	Candidate	Votes	%
Democratic	Herb Conaway	130	76.0
Democratic	Sarah Schoengood	22	12.9
Democratic	Carol Murphy	19	11.1
Democratic	Joe Cohn (Note: Did not appear on convention ballots due to missing the filing deadline, but was nominated.)	0	0.0
Total votes		171	100.0

==== Fundraising ====
Campaign finance reports as of May 15, 2024
Candidate	Raised	Spent	Cash on hand
Herb Conaway (D)	$504,508	$374,030	$130,478
Joe Cohn (D)	$140,176 (Note: $20,000 of this total was self-funded by Cohn)	$88,596	$51,579
Carol Murphy (D)	$169,052	$136,162	$32,890
Brian Schkeeper (D)	$14,960	$11,055	$3,905
Sarah Schoengood (D)	$32,878 (Note: $15,000 of this total was self funded by Schoengood)	$30,637	$2,241
Source: Federal Election Commission

==== Debates ====
3rd Congressional District democratic primary debate
No.	Date and time	Host	Moderator	Link	Participants		
P Present A Absent I Invited N Not invited Out Out of Race W Withdrawn					Cohn	Conaway	Murphy
1	May 14, 2024; 8 pm EST	New Jersey Globe; On New Jersey; Rebovich Institute	Laura Jones	YouTube	P	P	P

==== Polling ====
Poll source	Date(s) administered	Sample size	Margin of error	Joe Cohn	Herb Conaway	Carol Murphy	Brian Schkeeper	Sarah Schoengood	Undecided
Public Policy Polling (Note: Poll sponsored by Principled Veterans Fund, which is affiliated with a super PAC supporting Conaway)	April 26–27, 2024	516 (LV)	–	3%	25%	11%	2%	8%	51%
TargetSmart (Note: Poll sponsored by Murphy's campaign)	March 14–17, 2024	350 (RV)	± 5.2%	4%	22%	18%	–	3%	49%

==== Results ====
Democratic primary results
Party	Candidate	Votes	%
Democratic	Herb Conaway	27,528	49.6
Democratic	Carol Murphy	14,049	25.3
Democratic	Joe Cohn	6,517	11.7
Democratic	Sarah Schoengood	5,524	10.0
Democratic	Brian Schkeeper	1,862	3.4
Total votes		55,480	100.0

=== Republican primary ===
==== Nominee ====
- Rajesh Mohan, cardiologist

==== Eliminated in primary ====
- Michael Faccone, member of the Monmouth County Republican Committee
- Shirley Maia-Cusick, immigration consulting firm owner (previously ran for U.S. Senate)
- Gregory Sobocinski, financial advisor and independent candidate for this district in 2022

==== Declined ====
- Kristin Sinclair, activist
- Brandon Umba, former state assemblyman from the 8th district (2022–2024) (running for state assembly in 2025)

==== Endorsements ====
Shirley Maia-Cusick

Organizations

- New Jersey Right to Life (co-endorsement with Sobocinski)
Rajesh Mohan

U.S. representatives

- Chris Smith, U.S. representative from New Jersey's 4th congressional district (1981–present)

Political parties

- Burlington County Republican Party
- Mercer County Republican Party
- Monmouth County Republican Party
Gregory Sobocinski

Organizations

- New Jersey Right to Life (co-endorsement with Maia-Cusick)

===== County Convention results =====
County Convention results

Mercer County Republican Convention (March 13)
Party	Candidate	Votes	%
Republican	Rajesh Mohan	27	33.8
Republican	Shirley Maia-Cusick	26	32.5
Republican	Greg Sobocinski	26	32.5
Republican	Michael Faccone	1	1.3
Total votes		80	100.0

==== Fundraising ====
Campaign finance reports as of May 15, 2024
Candidate	Raised	Spent	Cash on hand
Shirley Maia-Cusick (R)	$341,866 (Note: $273,000 of this total was self-funded by Maia-Cusick)	$290,414	$51,452
Rajesh Mohan (R)	$123,961 (Note: $60,000 of this total was self-funded by Rajesh Mohan)	$89,179	$34,782
Gregory Sobocinski (R)	$15,450 (Note: $5,000 of this total was self-funded by Gregory Sobocinski)	$11,537	$4,662
Source: Federal Election Commission

==== Results ====
Republican primary results
Party	Candidate	Votes	%
Republican	Rajesh Mohan	13,011	38.1
Republican	Shirley Maia-Cusick	10,507	30.6
Republican	Michael Faccone	5,812	16.9
Republican	Gregory Sobocinski	4,947	14.3
Total votes		34,277	100.0

=== General election ===
==== Candidates ====
- Justin Barbera (Join the Revolution), general contractor

==== Predictions ====
Source	Ranking	As of
Cook Political Report	Solid D	March 21, 2024
Inside Elections	Solid D	September 15, 2023
Sabato's Crystal Ball	Safe D	June 5, 2024
Elections Daily	Safe D	September 7, 2023
CNalysis	Solid D	November 16, 2023
Decision Desk HQ	Likely D	October 7, 2024

==== Results ====
2024 New Jersey's 3rd congressional district election
Party	Candidate	Votes	%
Democratic	Herb Conaway	202,034	53.2
Republican	Rajesh Mohan	169,454	44.7
Green	Steven Welzer	3,478	0.9
Libertarian	Chris Russomanno	1,951	0.5
Independent	Douglas Wynn	1,332	0.4
Independent	Justin Barbera	1,235	0.3
Total votes		379,484	100.0
Democratic hold			

==== By county ====
County	Herb Conaway Democratic		Rajesh Mohan Republican		Various candidates Other parties		Margin		Total votes cast
County	#	%	#	%	#	%	#	%	Total votes cast
Burlington (part)	120,027	57.84%	83,808	40.38%	3,695	1.78%	36,219	17.45%	207,530
Mercer (part)	46,562	57.17%	32,715	40.17%	2,170	2.66%	13,847	17.00%	81,447
Monmouth (part)	35,445	39.07%	52,931	58.35%	2,335	2.57%	−17,486	−19.28%	90,711
Totals	202,034	53.21%	169,454	44.63%	8,200	2.16%	32,580	8.58%	379,688

== District 4 ==
2024 New Jersey's 4th congressional district election
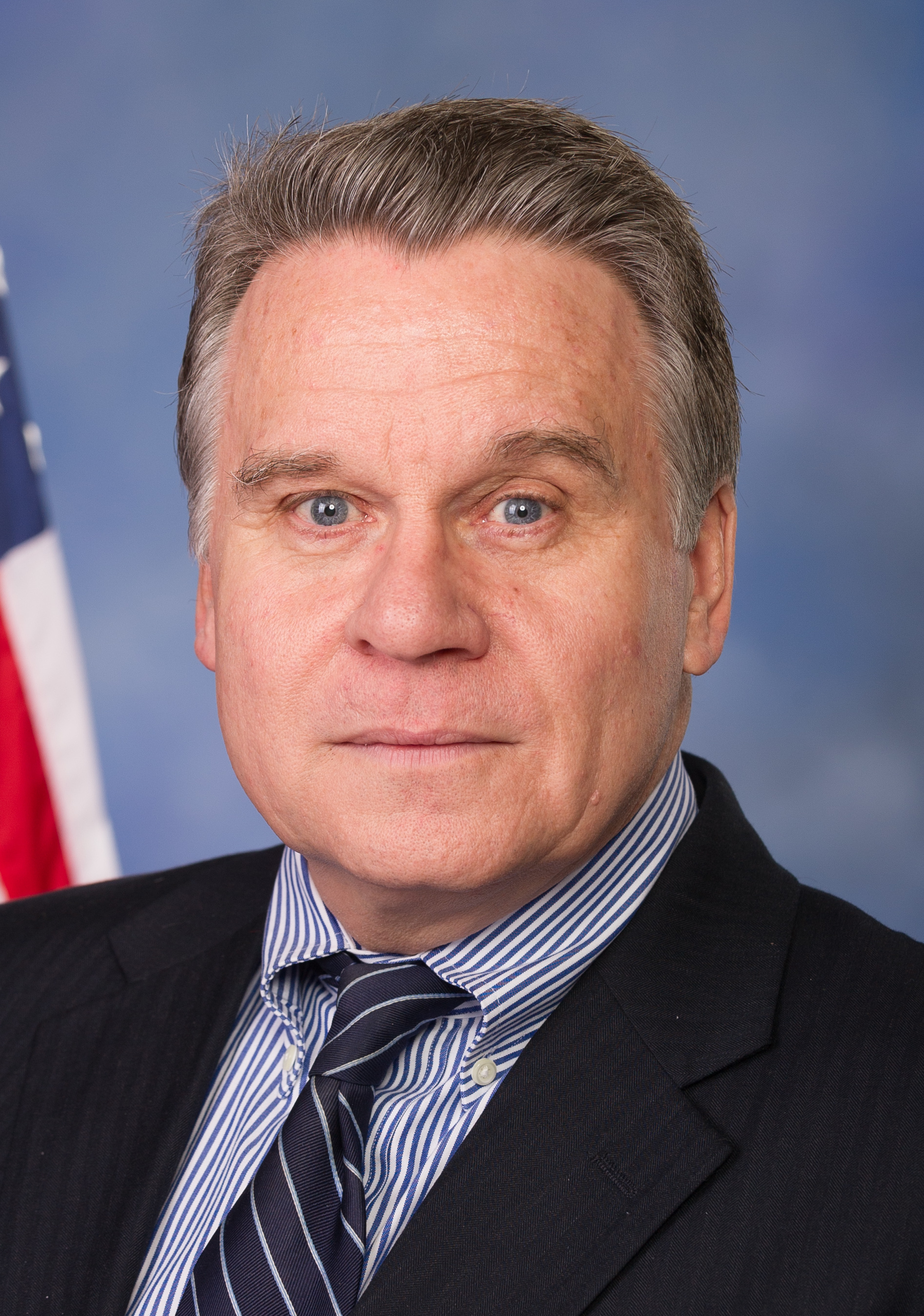

Nominee	Chris Smith	Matthew Jenkins
Party	Republican	Democratic
Popular vote	265,652	124,803
Percentage	67.4%	31.6%
- Smith: 50–60% 60–70% 70–80% 80–90% Jenkins: 50–60%
U.S. Representative before election
Chris Smith
Republican
Elected U.S. Representative
Chris Smith
Republican

The 4th district covers the upper Jersey Shore and expands into Monmouth and Ocean counties, taking in Lakewood Township and Toms River. The incumbent was Republican Chris Smith, who was re-elected with 66.9% of the vote in 2022.

=== Republican primary ===
==== Nominee ====
- Chris Smith, incumbent U.S. representative

==== Eliminated in primary ====
- David Schmidt, dock builder and independent candidate for this district in 2022

==== Endorsements ====
Chris Smith

Political parties

- Ocean County Republican Party

Organizations

- AIPAC
- Humane Society Legislative Fund
- New Jersey Right to Life
- Pro-Israel America

==== Fundraising ====
Campaign finance reports as of May 15, 2024
Candidate	Raised	Spent	Cash on hand
Chris Smith (R)	$539,677	$350,123	$415,986
Source: Federal Election Commission

==== Results ====
Republican primary
Party	Candidate	Votes	%
Republican	Chris Smith (incumbent)	36,897	84.9
Republican	David Schmidt	6,538	15.1
Total votes		43,435	100.0

=== Democratic primary ===
==== Nominee ====
- Matthew Jenkins, general contractor and nominee for this district in 2022

==== Endorsements ====
Matthew Jenkins

Political parties

- Monmouth County Democratic Party
- Ocean County Democratic Party

===== County Convention results =====
County Convention results

Ocean County Democratic Convention (March 10)
Party	Candidate	Votes	%
Democratic	Matthew Jenkins	133	82.6
Democratic	Pam Daniels	28	17.4
Total votes		161	100.0

==== Fundraising ====
Campaign finance reports as of May 15, 2024
Candidate	Raised	Spent	Cash on hand
Matthew Jenkins (D)	$8,775	$2,821	$9,265
Source: Federal Election Commission

==== Results ====
Democratic primary
Party	Candidate	Votes	%
Democratic	Matthew Jenkins	25,389	100.0
Total votes		25,389	100.0

=== General election ===
==== Predictions ====
Source	Ranking	As of
Cook Political Report	Solid R	March 21, 2024
Inside Elections	Solid R	September 15, 2023
Sabato's Crystal Ball	Safe R	September 26, 2023
Elections Daily	Safe R	September 7, 2023
CNalysis	Solid R	November 16, 2023
Decision Desk HQ	Safe R	October 7, 2024

==== Results ====
2024 New Jersey's 4th congressional district election
Party	Candidate	Votes	%
Republican	Chris Smith (incumbent)	265,652	67.4
Democratic	Matthew Jenkins	124,803	31.6
Libertarian	John Morrison	1,950	0.5
Green	Barry Bendar	1,823	0.5
Total votes		394,228	100.0
Republican hold			

==== By county ====
County	Chris Smith Republican		Matthew Jenkins Democratic		Various candidates Other parties		Margin		Total votes cast
County	#	%	#	%	#	%	#	%	Total votes cast
Monmouth (part)	87,680	61.69%	52,612	37.02%	1,842	1.30%	35,068	24.67%	142,134
Ocean (part)	177,972	70.51%	72,191	28.60%	2,249	0.89%	105,781	41.91%	252,412
Totals	265,652	67.33%	124,803	31.63%	4,091	1.04%	140,849	35.70%	394,546

== District 5 ==
2024 New Jersey's 5th congressional district election
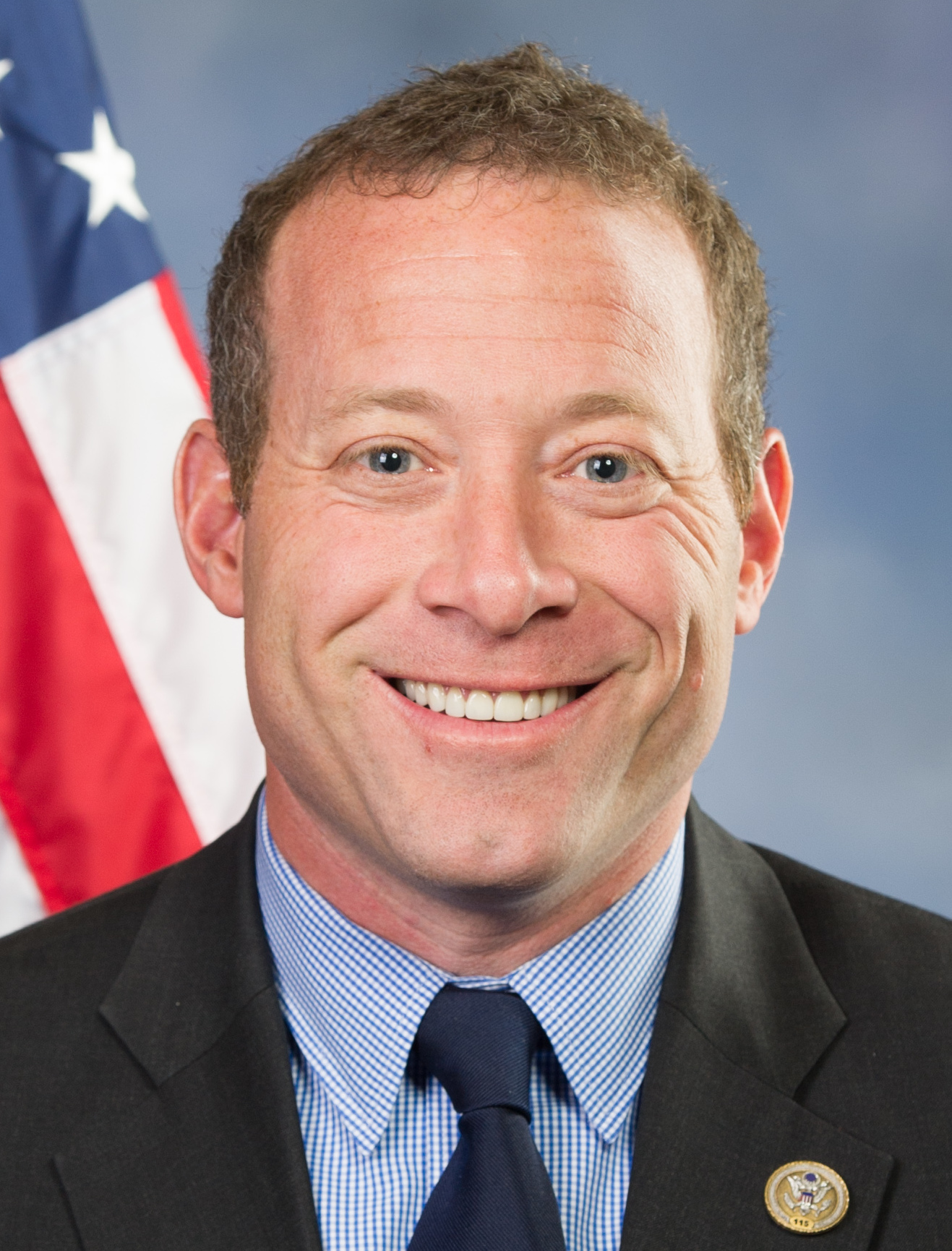

Nominee	Josh Gottheimer	Mary Jo-Ann Guinchard
Party	Democratic	Republican
Popular vote	208,359	165,287
Percentage	54.6%	43.3%
- Gottheimer: 40–50% 50–60% 60–70% 70–80% Guinchard: 40–50% 50–60% 60–70%
U.S. Representative before election
Josh Gottheimer
Democratic
Elected U.S. Representative
Josh Gottheimer
Democratic

The 5th district stretches across the state's northern border with New York, from Sussex to Bergen counties. The incumbent was Democrat Josh Gottheimer, who was re-elected with 54.7% of the vote in 2022.

=== Democratic primary ===
==== Nominee ====
- Josh Gottheimer, incumbent U.S. representative

==== Endorsements ====
Josh Gottheimer

State legislators

- Shama Haider, state assemblywoman from the 37th district (2022–present)
- Gordon M. Johnson, state senator from the 37th district (2022–present)
- Joseph Lagana, state senator from the 38th district (2018–present)
- Ellen Park, state assemblywoman from the 37th district (2022–present)
- Lisa Swain, state assemblywoman from the 38th district (2018–present)
- Chris Tully, state assemblyman from the 38th district (2018–present)
- Loretta Weinberg, former state senator from the 37th district (2005–2022)

Local officials

- Mark Sokolich, mayor of Fort Lee (2008–present)
- Michael Wildes, mayor of Englewood (2004–2010; 2019–present)

Political parties

- Bergen County Democratic Party
- Sussex County Democratic Party

Organizations

- AIPAC
- Democratic Majority for Israel
- Humane Society Legislative Fund
- International Franchise Association
- Joint Action Committee for Political Affairs
- National Organization for Women PAC
- Pro-Israel America
- U.S. Chamber of Commerce

Labor unions

- International Brotherhood of Electrical Workers Local 164
- National Education Association

==== Fundraising ====
Campaign finance reports as of May 15, 2024
Candidate	Raised	Spent	Cash on hand
Josh Gottheimer (D)	$6,871,585	$1,778,366	$18,439,167
Source: Federal Election Commission

==== Results ====
Democratic primary results
Party	Candidate	Votes	%
Democratic	Josh Gottheimer (incumbent)	42,819	100.0
Total votes		42,819	100.0

=== Republican primary ===
==== Nominee ====
- Mary Jo-Ann Guinchard, former mayor of Tuxedo Park, New York

==== Eliminated in primary ====
- George Song, Paramus Public Schools Board of Education member (2022–present)

==== Withdrawn ====
- Dierdre Paul, college professor and perennial candidate
- Sandy Gajapathy

==== Endorsements ====
Mary Jo-Ann Guinchard

Political parties

- Bergen County Republican Party
- Sussex County Republican Party

Organizations

- New Jersey Right to Life
George Song

Political parties

- Passaic County Republican Party

===== County Convention results =====
County Convention results

Bergen County Republican Convention (March 19)
Party	Candidate	Votes	%
Republican	Mary Jo-Ann Guinchard	235	56.1
Republican	George Song	179	42.7
Republican	Sandy Gajapathy	5	1.2
Total votes		419	100.0

==== Fundraising ====
Campaign finance reports as of May 15, 2024
Candidate	Raised	Spent	Cash on hand
Mary Jo-Ann Guinchard (R)	$74,933 (Note: $64,000 of this total was self-funded by Guinchard)	$57,314	$17,619
George Song (R)	$11,945	$1,077	$10,867
Source: Federal Election Commission

==== Results ====
Republican primary results
Party	Candidate	Votes	%
Republican	Mary Jo-Ann Guinchard	21,321	69.8
Republican	George Song	9,238	30.2
Total votes		30,559	100.0

=== General election ===
==== Predictions ====
Source	Ranking	As of
Cook Political Report	Solid D	March 21, 2024
Inside Elections	Solid D	September 15, 2023
Sabato's Crystal Ball	Safe D	September 26, 2023
Elections Daily	Safe D	October 10, 2024
CNalysis	Solid D	November 16, 2023
Decision Desk HQ	Safe D	October 7, 2024

==== Results ====
2024 New Jersey's 5th congressional district election
Party	Candidate	Votes	%
Democratic	Josh Gottheimer (incumbent)	208,359	54.6
Republican	Mary Jo-Ann Guinchard	165,287	43.3
Green	Beau Forte	3,428	0.9
Libertarian	James Tosone	2,440	0.6
Independent	Aamir Arif	2,375	0.6
Total votes		381,889	100.0
Democratic hold			

==== By county ====
County	Josh Gottheimer Democratic		Mary Jo-Ann Guinchard Republican		Various candidates Other parties		Margin		Total votes cast
County	#	%	#	%	#	%	#	%	Total votes cast
Bergen (part)	176,817	58.32%	119,958	39.57%	6,411	2.11%	56,859	18.75%	303,186
Passaic (part)	13,322	42.14%	17,540	55.48%	751	2.38%	−4,218	−13.34%	31,613
Sussex (part)	18,220	38.52%	27,789	58.75%	1,289	2.73%	−9,569	−20.23%	47,298
Totals	208,359	54.53%	165,287	43.26%	8,451	2.21%	43,072	11.27%	382,097

== District 6 ==
2024 New Jersey's 6th congressional district election
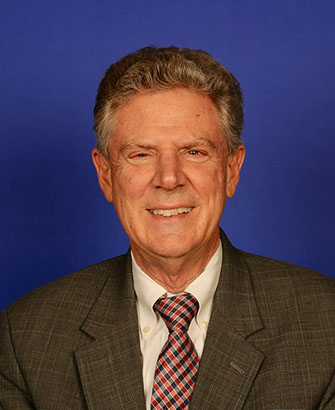

Nominee	Frank Pallone	Scott Fegler
Party	Democratic	Republican
Popular vote	170,275	122,519
Percentage	56.1%	40.3%
- Pallone: 40–50% 50–60% 60–70% 70–80% Fegler: 40–50% 50–60% 70–80%
U.S. Representative before election
Frank Pallone
Democratic
Elected U.S. Representative
Frank Pallone
Democratic

The 6th district takes in towns along the Raritan Bay, including Edison and Woodbridge, while also stretching into coastal Monmouth County. The incumbent was Democrat Frank Pallone, who was re-elected with 57.5% of the vote in 2022.

=== Democratic primary ===
==== Nominee ====
- Frank Pallone, incumbent U.S. representative

==== Eliminated in primary ====
- John Hsu, software engineer and candidate for this district in 2020

==== Endorsements ====
Frank Pallone

Political parties

- Middlesex County Democratic Party
- Monmouth County Democratic Party

Organizations

- AIPAC
- Humane Society Legislative Fund
- Planned Parenthood Action Fund
- Pro-Israel America

Labor unions

- National Education Association
Declined to endorse

U.S. representatives

- Andy Kim, U.S. representative from New Jersey's 3rd congressional district (2019–present)

==== Fundraising ====
Campaign finance reports as of May 15, 2024
Candidate	Raised	Spent	Cash on hand
John Hsu (D) (Note: Did not file for pre-primary deadline)	$1,235	$731	$3,582
Frank Pallone (D)	$2,097,056	$1,518,555	$3,265,244
Source: Federal Election Commission

==== Results ====
Democratic primary results
Party	Candidate	Votes	%
Democratic	Frank Pallone (incumbent)	36,649	84.0
Democratic	John Hsu	6,992	16.0
Total votes		43,641	100.0

=== Republican primary ===
==== Nominee ====
- Scott Fegler, business development executive

==== Eliminated in primary ====
- Gregg Mele, attorney and perennial candidate (previously ran for U.S. Senate)

==== Endorsements ====
Scott Fegler

Political parties

- Middlesex County Republican Party
- Monmouth County Republican Party

===== County Convention results =====
County Convention results

Middlesex County Republican Convention (March 14)
Party	Candidate	Votes	%
Republican	Scott Fegler	58	78.4
Republican	Gregg Mele	16	21.6
Total votes		74	100.0

==== Fundraising ====
Campaign finance reports as of May 15, 2024
Candidate	Raised	Spent	Cash on hand
Scott Fegler (R)	$33,932 (Note: $4,100 of this total was self-funded by Fegler)	$28,692	$5,240
Source: Federal Election Commission

==== Results ====
Republican primary results
Party	Candidate	Votes	%
Republican	Scott Fegler	15,215	81.6
Republican	Gregg Mele	3,440	18.4
Total votes		18,655	100.0

=== Independents ===
==== Filed paperwork ====
- Fahad Akhtar (Common Sense Independent), FBI agent
- Justin Maldonado, perennial candidate

=== General election ===
==== Predictions ====
Source	Ranking	As of
Cook Political Report	Solid D	March 21, 2024
Inside Elections	Solid D	September 15, 2023
Sabato's Crystal Ball	Safe D	September 26, 2023
Elections Daily	Safe D	September 7, 2023
CNalysis	Solid D	November 16, 2023
Decision Desk HQ	Safe D	October 7, 2024

==== Results ====
2024 New Jersey's 6th congressional district election
Party	Candidate	Votes	%
Democratic	Frank Pallone (incumbent)	170,275	56.1
Republican	Scott Fegler	122,519	40.3
Independent	Fahad Akhtar	4,871	1.6
Green	Herb Tarbous	4,246	1.4
Libertarian	Matthew Amitrano	1,770	0.6
Total votes		303,681	100.0
Democratic hold			

==== By county ====
County	Frank Pallone Democratic		Scott Fegle Republican		Various candidates Other parties		Margin		Total votes cast
County	#	%	#	%	#	%	#	%	Total votes cast
Middlesex (part)	111,690	58.31%	71,173	37.16%	8,673	4.53%	40,517	21.15%	191,536
Monmouth (part)	58,585	52.07%	51,346	45.64%	2,578	2.29%	7,239	6.43%	112,509
Totals	170,275	56.00%	122,519	40.30%	11,251	3.70%	47,756	15.71%	304,045

== District 7 ==
2024 New Jersey's 7th congressional district election
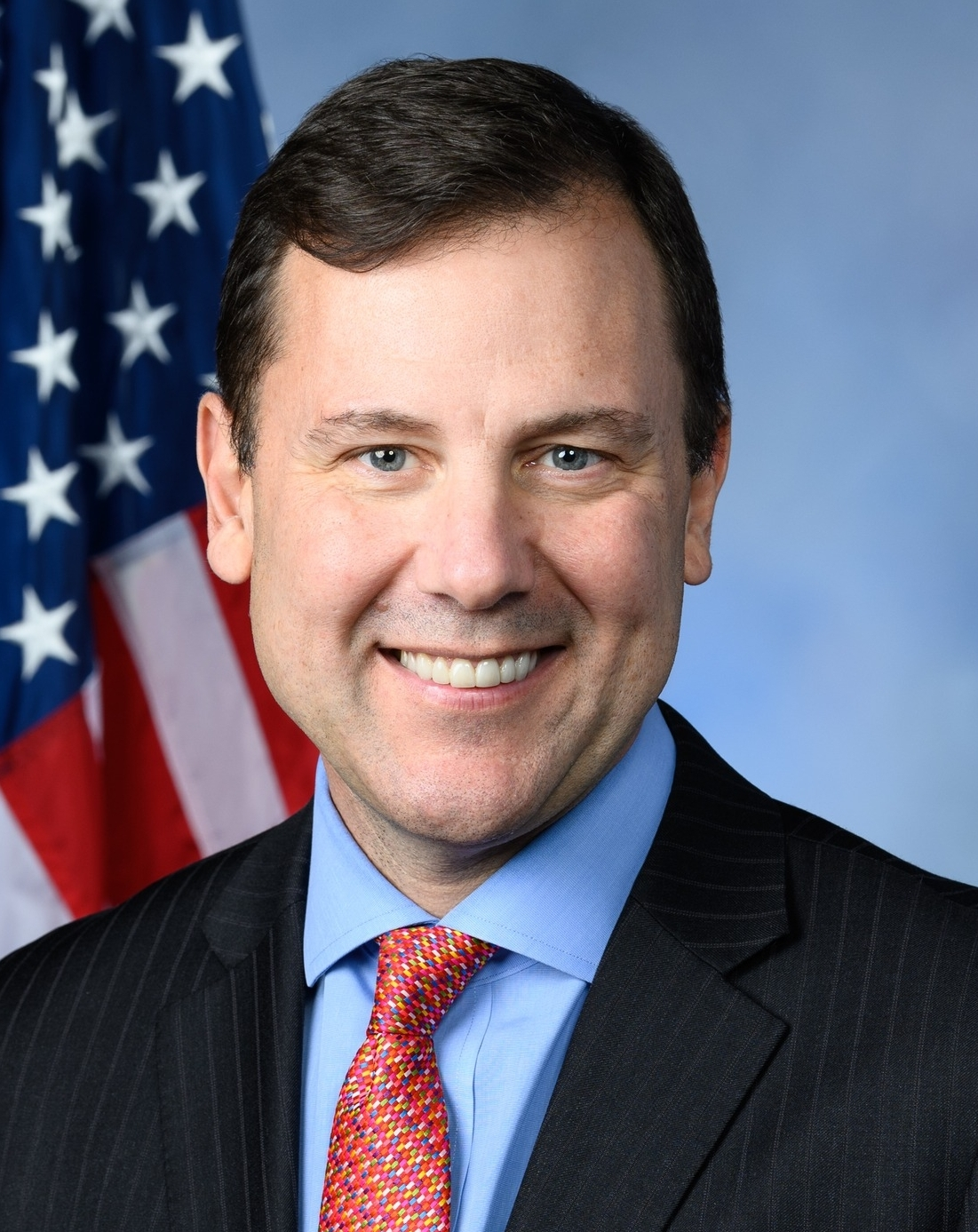

Nominee	Thomas Kean Jr.	Sue Altman
Party	Republican	Democratic
Popular vote	223,331	200,025
Percentage	51.8%	46.4%
- Kean: 40–50% 50–60% 60–70% 70–80% 80–90% Altman: 40–50% 50–60% 60–70% 70–80%
U.S. Representative before election
Thomas Kean Jr.
Republican
Elected U.S. Representative
Thomas Kean Jr.
Republican

The 7th district is one of the wealthiest districts in the U.S., encompassing the New Jersey Highlands of Hunterdon and Warren counties. The incumbent was Republican Thomas Kean Jr., who flipped the district and was elected with 51.4% of the vote in 2022. The Hill called the election for Kean at 12:03AM on November 6, with 52.5% of the vote to Altman's 45.7% with 95% reporting.

=== Republican primary ===
==== Nominee ====
- Thomas Kean Jr., incumbent U.S. representative

==== Eliminated in primary ====
- Roger Bacon, production mechanic and perennial candidate

==== Endorsements ====
Thomas Kean Jr.

U.S. representatives

- Mike Johnson, Speaker of the U.S. House of Representatives (2023–present)
- Kevin McCarthy, U.S. representative from California's 20th congressional district (2007–23) and former Speaker of the House (2023)

Political parties

- Somerset County Republican Party
- Sussex County Republican Party
- Warren County Republican Party

Organizations

- AIPAC
- Log Cabin Republicans PAC
- NORPAC
- Pro-Israel America
- Republican Jewish Coalition
- U.S. Chamber of Commerce (post-primary)

==== Fundraising ====
Campaign finance reports as of May 15, 2024
Candidate	Raised	Spent	Cash on hand
Thomas Kean Jr. (R)	$3,624,416	$1,182,161	$2,536,334
Source: Federal Election Commission

==== Results ====
Republican primary results
Party	Candidate	Votes	%
Republican	Thomas Kean Jr. (incumbent)	37,623	78.2
Republican	Roger Bacon	10,460	21.8
Total votes		48,083	100.0

=== Democratic primary ===
==== Nominee ====
- Sue Altman, former executive director of the New Jersey Working Families Party

==== Withdrawn ====
- Jason Blazakis, geopolitical risk consulting executive and former Director of Counterterrorism Financing at the U.S. Department of State (endorsed Altman)
- Joe Signorello, mayor of Roselle Park and nominee for SD-21 in 2021
- Greg Vartan, Summit common councilor (endorsed Altman)

==== Declined ====
- Marci Bandelli, gun safety activist (endorsed Altman)
- Roy Freiman, state assemblyman from the 16th district (2018–present)
- Jim Johnson, former U.S. Under Secretary of the Treasury and candidate for Governor of New Jersey in 2017 (endorsed Altman)
- Joe Kelley, member of the Port Authority of New York and New Jersey Board of Commissioners and former deputy chief of staff to governor Phil Murphy
- James Kennedy, state assemblyman from the 22nd district (2016–present)
- Matt Klapper, chief of staff to U.S. Attorney General Merrick Garland and former chief of staff to U.S. Senator Cory Booker
- Raymond Lesniak, former state senator from the 20th district (1983–2018) and candidate for Governor of New Jersey in 2017
- Tom Malinowski, former U.S. representative from New Jersey's 7th congressional district (2019–2023) (endorsed Altman)
- Tina Shah, cardiologist and former senior advisor to U.S. Surgeon General Vivek Murthy

==== Endorsements ====
Sue Altman

U.S. executive branch officials

- Jim Johnson, former U.S. Under Secretary of the Treasury (1998–2001)

U.S. senators

- Cory Booker, New Jersey (2013–present)

U.S. representatives

- Lois Frankel, FL-22 (2013–present)
- Pramila Jayapal, WA-07 (2017–present)
- Andy Kim, NJ-03 (2019–present)
- Tom Malinowski, NJ-07 (2019–2023)
- Frank Pallone, NJ-06 (1988–present)
- Bill Pascrell, NJ-09 (1997–2024)
- Donald Payne Jr., NJ-10 (2012–2024)
- Mark Pocan, WI-02 (2013–present)
- Jamie Raskin, MD-08 (2017–present)
- Mikie Sherrill, NJ-11 (2019–present)
- Bonnie Watson Coleman, NJ-12 (2015–present)

Local officials

- Greg Vartan, Summit council president and former candidate for this district

Individuals

- Jason Blazakis, former candidate for this district

Political parties

- Hunterdon County Democratic Party
- Morris County Democratic Party
- Somerset County Democratic Party
- Sussex County Democratic Party
- Union County Democratic Party
- Warren County Democratic Party

Organizations

- Congressional Progressive Caucus PAC
- DCCC Red to Blue
- Democratic Majority for Israel
- EMILY's List
- End Citizens United
- Food & Water Action
- Jewish Democratic Council of America
- League of Conservation Voters
- Make the Road Action
- National Organization for Women PAC
- Patriotic Millionaires
- Planned Parenthood Action Fund
- Reproductive Freedom for All
- Sierra Club
- Working Families Party

Labor unions

- American Federation of State, County and Municipal Employees
- Communications Workers of America (Note: National, New Jersey, and District 1)
- Hotel and Gaming Trades Council, AFL-CIO
- International Federation of Professional and Technical Engineers
- National Education Association
- New Jersey Education Association
- Rutgers AAUP
- SEIU 32BJ
Jason Blazakis (withdrawn)

U.S. representatives

- Annie Kuster, U.S. representative from New Hampshire's 2nd congressional district (2013–present)
- Max Rose, former U.S. representative from New York's 11th congressional district (2019–2021)

Organizations

- ~~Democratic Majority for Israel~~
- New Politics
- NewDem Action Fund
Declined to endorse

Organizations

- Democratic Majority for Israel (previously endorsed Blazakis)

==== Fundraising ====
Campaign finance reports as of May 15, 2024
Candidate	Raised	Spent	Cash on hand
Sue Altman (D)	$1,741,475	$595,086	$1,146,389
Source: Federal Election Commission

==== Results ====
Democratic primary results
Party	Candidate	Votes	%
Democratic	Sue Altman	38,030	100.0
Total votes		38,030	100.0

=== General election ===
==== Predictions ====
Source	Ranking	As of
Cook Political Report	Lean R	October 8, 2024
Inside Elections	Tilt R	September 15, 2023
Sabato's Crystal Ball	Lean R	September 26, 2023
Elections Daily	Lean R	November 4, 2024
CNalysis	Tilt R	November 16, 2023
Decision Desk HQ	Lean R	October 7, 2024

==== Debates ====
Debates among candidates for the 7th Congressional District
No.	Date and time	Host	Place	Moderator	Link	Participants	
Key: P Participant A Absent N Non-invitee I Invitee W Withdrawn						Altman	Kean
1	March 12, 2024; 7 pm EST	Blue Wave NJ; New Jersey Working Families Party	Bridgewater Marriott, Bridgewater	Tom Malinowski	N/A	P	A
2	October 13, 2024; 8 pm EST	New Jersey Globe; On New Jersey; The Rebovich Institute at Rider University	Live streamed	Laura Jones	YouTube	P	P

==== Polling ====
Poll source	Date(s) administered	Sample size	Margin of error	Tom Kean Jr.	Sue Altman	Undecided
Monmouth University	October 10–14, 2024	603 (RV)	± 4.4%	46%	44%	10%
DCCC Analytics (D)	October 8–9, 2024	386 (LV)	± 5.0%	50%	48%	2%
Global Strategy Group (D) (Note: Poll sponsored by Altman's campaign)	September 30 – October 3, 2024	500 (LV)	± 4.4%	47%	45%	7%
Public Policy Polling (D) (Note: Poll sponsored by Blazakis's campaign)	January 16–17, 2023	608 (LV)	± 4.0%	41%	33%	26%

Hypothetical polling

Tom Kean Jr. vs. Jason Blazakis

Poll source	Date(s) administered	Sample size	Margin of error	Tom Kean Jr.	Jason Blazakis	Undecided
Public Policy Polling (D)	January 16–17, 2023	608 (LV)	± 4.0%	43%	35%	22%

Generic Republican vs. generic Democrat

Poll source	Date(s) administered	Sample size	Margin of error	Generic Republican	Generic Democrat	Undecided
Public Policy Polling (D)	January 16–17, 2023	608 (LV)	± 4.0%	49%	41%	10%

==== Results ====
2024 New Jersey's 7th congressional district election
Party	Candidate	Votes	%
Republican	Thomas Kean Jr. (incumbent)	223,331	51.8
Democratic	Sue Altman	200,025	46.4
Green	Andrew Black	4,258	1.0
Libertarian	Lana Leguia	3,784	0.9
Total votes		431,398	100.0
Republican hold			

==== By county ====
County	Thomas Kean Jr. Republican		Sue Altman Democratic		Various candidates Other parties		Margin		Total votes cast
County	#	%	#	%	#	%	#	%	Total votes cast
Hunterdon	42,257	53.87%	34,744	44.29%	1,448	1.85%	7,513	9.58%	78,449
Morris (part)	35,812	54.39%	28,768	43.69%	1,263	1.92%	7,044	10.70%	65,843
Somerset (part)	44,577	50.24%	42,416	47.81%	1,732	1.95%	2,161	2.44%	88,725
Sussex (part)	20,491	59.56%	12,828	37.29%	1,086	3.16%	7,663	22.27%	34,405
Union (part)	44,904	42.55%	59,008	55.91%	1,624	1.54%	−14,104	−13.36%	105,536
Warren	35,290	60.00%	22,261	37.85%	1,263	2.15%	13,029	22.15%	58,814
Totals	223,331	51.72%	200,025	46.33%	8,416	1.95%	23,306	5.40%	431,772

== District 8 ==
2024 New Jersey's 8th congressional district election
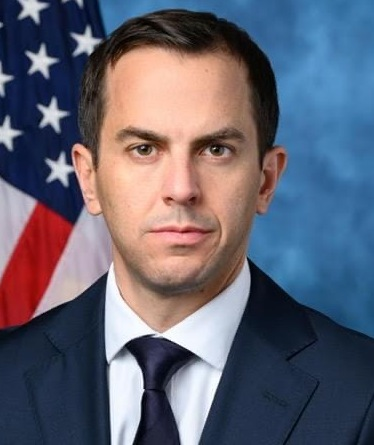

Nominee	Rob Menendez	Anthony Valdes
Party	Democratic	Republican
Popular vote	116,434	68,152
Percentage	59.2%	34.6%
- Menendez: 40–50% 50–60% 60–70%
U.S. Representative before election
Rob Menendez
Democratic
Elected U.S. Representative
Rob Menendez
Democratic

The 8th district is majority Hispanic and contains the urban areas of Elizabeth, Hoboken, and Union City, as well as parts of Newark and Jersey City. The incumbent was Democrat Rob Menendez, who was elected to a first term with 73.62% of the vote in 2022. Menendez was believed to be vulnerable to a primary challenge due to ties to his father, Senator Bob Menendez, who was facing controversy due to a number of federal corruption charges. However, he received support from high-profile Democrats, including House Minority Leader Hakeem Jeffries, and was able to win renomination by a 15-point margin.

=== Democratic primary ===
==== Nominee ====
- Rob Menendez, incumbent U.S. representative

==== Eliminated in primary ====
- Ravinder Bhalla, mayor of Hoboken (2018–present) and candidate for New Jersey's 33rd assembly district in 2011 and 2013
- Kyle Jasey, real estate investor and son of former state assemblywoman Mila Jasey (previously ran for U.S. Senate)

==== Declined ====
- James Solomon, Jersey City councilor from ward E (2017–present) (endorsed Bhalla)

==== Endorsements ====
Ravinder Bhalla

Local officials

- Phil Cohen, Hoboken city councilor from the 5th ward
- Joe Quintero, at-large Hoboken city councilor (2022–present)
- James Solomon, Jersey City councilor from ward E (2017–present)
- Joyce Watterman, president of the Jersey City Council (2023–present) from the at-large district (2013–present)

Party chapters

- Hoboken Democrats

Organizations

- AAPI Victory Fund

Newspapers

- The Jersey Journal
Rob Menendez

U.S. senators

- Cory Booker, New Jersey (2013–present)

U.S. representatives

- Pete Aguilar, CA-33 (2015–present)
- Katherine Clark, MA-08 (2013–present)
- Josh Gottheimer, NJ-05 (2017–present)
- Hakeem Jeffries, NY-08 (2013–present) and House Minority Leader (2023–present)
- Donald Payne Jr., NJ-10 (2012–2024)
- Linda Sánchez, CA-38 (2003–present)
- Albio Sires, NJ-08 (2006–2023)
- Bonnie Watson Coleman, NJ-12 (2015–present)

Statewide officials

- Jim McGreevey, former governor of New Jersey (2002–2004)
- Phil Murphy, governor of New Jersey (2018–present)

State legislators

- 6 state senators
- 6 state assemblymembers

County officials

- Craig Guy, Hudson County Executive (2024–present)

Local officials

- Ras Baraka, mayor of Newark (2014–present)
- Christian Bollwage, mayor of Elizabeth (1993–present)
- Felix Roque, former mayor of West New York (2011–2019)
- 7 other mayors
- Tiffanie Fisher, Hoboken city councilor from the 2nd ward

Party officials

- LeRoy J. Jones Jr., New Jersey Democratic Party chair (2021–present)
- Anthony Vainieri Jr., Hudson County Democratic Chair

Political parties

- Essex County Democratic Party
- Hudson County Democratic Party
- Union County Democratic Party

Organizations

- AIPAC
- CHC BOLD PAC
- Democratic Majority for Israel
- Human Rights Campaign
- Jewish Democratic Council of America
- Latino Victory Fund
- League of Conservation Voters
- National Organization for Women PAC
- Pro-Israel America

Labor unions

- AFSCME Council 63
- Amalgamated Transit Union
- Association of Flight Attendants
- Brotherhood of Locomotive Engineers and Trainmen
- Communications Workers of America
- International Association of Fire Fighters Local 1066
- International Brotherhood of Electrical Workers Local 164
- International Federation of Professional and Technical Engineers
- International Longshoremen's Association
- International Union of Painters and Allied Trades District Council 21
- Laborers' Union
- National Education Association
- Sheet Metal Workers Local 25
Declined to endorse

U.S. senators

- John Fetterman, Pennsylvania (2023–present)

U.S. representatives

- Andy Kim, U.S. representative from New Jersey's 3rd congressional district (2019–present)

==== Polling ====
Poll source	Date(s) administered	Sample size	Margin of error	Ravinder Bhalla	Kyle Jasey	Rob Menendez	Undecided
Global Strategy Group (D) (Note: Poll sponsored by the super PAC America's Promise)	April 1–4, 2024	400 (LV)	± 4.9%	33%	7%	28%	32%
GQR (D) (Note: Poll sponsored by Bhalla's campaign)	February 1–7, 2024	403 (LV)	± 4.9%	41%	–	44%	15%
TargetSmart (D) (Note: Poll sponsored by Menendez's campaign)	January 25 – February 1, 2024	400 (RV)	± 4.9%	24%	6%	46%	24%

Hypothetical polling

Poll source	Date(s) administered	Sample size	Margin of error	Ravinder Bhalla	Rob Menendez	James Solomon	Esther Suarez	Undecided
Change Research (D)	November 28 – December 1, 2023	762 (V)	–	13%	16%	9%	3%	59%

==== Debates ====
Debates among candidates for the Democratic nomination for the 8th congressional district in New Jersey
No.	Date and time	Place	Host	Moderator	Link	Participants		
P Present A Absent I Invited N Not invited W Withdrawn						Bhalla	Jasey	Menendez
1	May 5, 2024; 8 pm EST	Livestreamed	New Jersey Globe; On New Jersey; Rebovich Institute	Laura Jones	Link	P	N	P
2	May 28, 2024	Livestreamed	Hudson County View	John Heinis	Link	P	N	P

==== Fundraising ====
Campaign finance reports as of May 15, 2024
Candidate	Raised	Spent	Cash on hand
Ravinder Bhalla (D)	$2,021,794	$1,637,260	$384,534
Kyle Jasey (D)	$51,350	$42,385	$8,965
Rob Menendez (D)	$1,642,827	$1,301,668	$696,354
Source: Federal Election Commission

==== Results ====
2024 Democratic primary results by precinct: Menendez: 40–50%; 50–60%; 60–70%; 70–80%; 80–90%; 90–100%; Bhalla: 40–50%; 50–60%; 60–70%; 70–80%; 80–90%; Jasey: 30–40%; Ties: 20–30%; 30–40%; 40–50%; 50%; No data

Democratic primary results
Party	Candidate	Votes	%
Democratic	Rob Menendez (incumbent)	22,465	52.0
Democratic	Ravinder Bhalla	16,218	37.5
Democratic	Kyle Jasey	4,528	10.5
Total votes		43,211	100.0

=== Republican primary ===
==== Nominee ====
- Anthony Valdes

==== Results ====
Republican primary results
Party	Candidate	Votes	%
Republican	Anthony Valdes	4,905	100.0
Total votes		4,905	100.0

=== Third-party and independent candidates ===
==== Declared ====
- Lea Sherman (Socialist Workers Party), political organizer and perennial candidate

=== General election ===
==== Predictions ====
Source	Ranking	As of
Cook Political Report	Solid D	March 21, 2024
Inside Elections	Solid D	September 15, 2023
Sabato's Crystal Ball	Safe D	September 26, 2023
Elections Daily	Safe D	September 7, 2023
CNalysis	Solid D	November 16, 2023
Decision Desk HQ	Safe D	October 7, 2024

==== Results ====
2024 New Jersey's 8th congressional district election
Party	Candidate	Votes	%
Democratic	Rob Menendez (incumbent)	116,434	59.2
Republican	Anthony Valdes	68,152	34.6
Green	Christian Robbins	5,465	2.8
Labour (Note: Not an actual U.S. political party. In New Jersey, independent candidates are allowed to choose a ballot label)	Pablo Olivera	4,295	2.2
Socialist Workers	Lea Sherman	2,419	1.2
Total votes		196,765	100.0
Democratic hold			

==== By county ====
County	Rob Menendez Democratic		Anthony Valdes Republican		Various candidates Other parties		Margin		Total votes cast
County	#	%	#	%	#	%	#	%	Total votes cast
Essex (part)	12,852	62.43%	6,751	32.79%	984	4.78%	6,101	29.64%	20,587
Hudson (part)	88,618	58.63%	51,375	33.99%	11,169	7.39%	37,243	24.64%	151,162
Union (part)	14,964	57.81%	10,026	38.73%	896	3.46%	4,938	19.08%	25,886
Totals	116,434	58.91%	68,152	34.48%	13,049	6.60%	48,282	24.43%	197,635

== District 9 ==
2024 New Jersey's 9th congressional district election
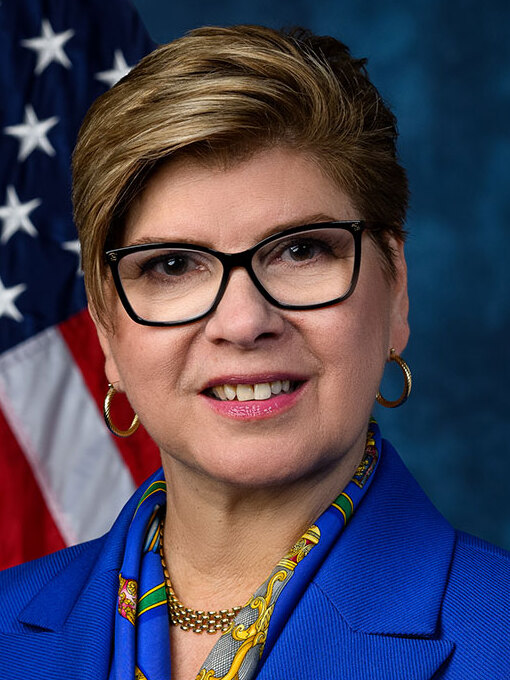

Nominee	Nellie Pou (replacing Bill Pascrell)	Billy Prempeh
Party	Democratic	Republican
Popular vote	130,514	117,939
Percentage	50.8%	45.9%
- Pou: 40–50% 50–60% 60–70% Prempeh: 50–60% 60–70% 80–90%
U.S. Representative before election
Vacant
Elected U.S. Representative
Nellie Pou
Democratic

The 9th district consists of the central urban areas of the Gateway Region, including the cities of Clifton, Passaic, and Paterson. The incumbent was Democrat Bill Pascrell, who was re-elected with 55.0% of the vote in 2022. Pascrell died on August 21, 2024.

=== Democratic primary ===
Pascrell defeated Mohamed Khairullah, the mayor of Prospect Park, in the June primary, but died on August 21, 2024. On August 29, the Democratic Party chairpersons of Bergen, Passaic, and Hudson Counties selected Nellie Pou, State Senator from District 35, as their new candidate.

==== Former nominee ====
- Bill Pascrell, incumbent U.S. representative (died August 21, 2024)

==== Eliminated in primary ====
- Mohamed Khairullah, mayor of Prospect Park (2005–present)

==== Declined ====
- Ali Aljarrah, vice chair of CAIR New Jersey
- Andre Sayegh, mayor of Paterson (2018–present)
- Shavonda Sumter, state assemblywoman from the 35th district (2012–present) (endorsed Pascrell)
- Benjie Wimberly, state assemblyman from the 35th district (2012–present) (endorsed Pascrell)

==== Endorsements ====
Mohamed Khairullah

Organizations

- Emgage Action
Bill Pascrell (deceased)

U.S. senators

- Cory Booker, New Jersey (2013–present)

Statewide officials

- Phil Murphy, governor of New Jersey (2018–present)

U.S. representatives

- Pete Aguilar, CA-33 (2015–present)
- Katherine Clark, MA-05 (2013–present)
- Hakeem Jeffries, NY-08 (2013–present) and House Minority Leader (2023–present)
- Gregory Meeks, NY-05 (1998–present)
- Linda Sánchez, CA-38 (2003–present)

State legislators

- 6 state senators
- 12 state assemblymembers

Local officials

- 18 mayors
- 21 municipal elected officials

Party officials

- John Currie, Passaic County Democratic chair and former New Jersey Democratic Party chair (2013–2021)
- Paul Juliano, Bergen County Democratic chair
- Anthony Vainieri Jr., Hudson County Democratic chair

Political parties

- Bergen County Democratic Party
- Hudson County Democratic Party
- Passaic County Democratic Party

Organizations

- AIPAC
- Brady PAC
- Congressional Black Caucus PAC
- Congressional Hispanic Caucus PAC
- Humane Society Legislative Fund
- Jewish Democratic Council of America
- League of Conservation Voters

Labor unions

- International Federation of Professional and Technical Engineers
- National Education Association
- New Jersey State Building and Construction Trades Council
Declined to endorse

U.S. representatives

- Andy Kim, U.S. representative from New Jersey's 3rd congressional district (2019–present)

=== Fundraising ===
Campaign finance reports as of May 15, 2024
Candidate	Raised	Spent	Cash on hand
Mohamed Khairullah (D)	$239,249	$111,162	$112,168
Bill Pascrell (D)	$1,033,350	$971,579	$1,422,815
Source: Federal Election Commission

==== Results ====
Democratic primary results
Party	Candidate	Votes	%
Democratic	Bill Pascrell (incumbent)	26,514	76.1
Democratic	Mohamed Khairullah	8,328	23.9
Total votes		34,842	100.0

=== Replacement nominee selection ===
Governor Phil Murphy had the authority to call for a special election to fill the remaining few months of Pascrell's current congressional term, though ultimately did not do so. Democratic County Committee members from Passaic, Bergen and Hudson held a meeting on August 29 to nominate Pascrell's replacement in the November election.

==== Replacement nominee ====
- Nellie Pou, state senator from the 35th district (2012–present)

==== Withdrawn ====
- Andre Sayegh, mayor of Paterson (2018–present)
- Shavonda Sumter, state assemblywoman from the 35th district (2012–present)
- Benjie Wimberly, state assemblyman from the 35th district (2012–present)

==== Declined ====
- Clinton Calabrese, state assemblyman from the 36th district (2018–present)
- Hector Lora, mayor of Passaic (2016–present)
- Gary Schaer, state assemblyman from the 36th district (2006–present)
- Tracy Silna Zur, Bergen County Commissioner (2012–present)

==== Endorsements ====
Nellie Pou

Executive officials

- Phil Murphy, governor of New Jersey (2018–2026)
- Pedro Pierluisi, governor of Puerto Rico (2019, 2021–2025)

U.S. representatives

- Adriano Espaillat, NY-13 (2017–present)
- Rob Menendez, NJ-08 (2023–present)
- Darren Soto, FL-09 (2017–present)
- Nydia Velázquez, NY-07 (1993–present)

State legislators

- Paul Sarlo, state senator from the 36th district (2003–present) and mayor of Wood-Ridge (2000–present)

Mayors

- Miguel Romero, mayor of San Juan, Puerto Rico (2021-present)

Party officials

- John Currie, Passaic County Democratic chair and former New Jersey Democratic Party chair (2013–2021) (previously endorsed Sumter)
- Craig Guy, Hudson County Democratic chair and Hudson County Executive (2024–present)
- Paul Juliano, Bergen County Democratic chair
- 22 Democratic municipal chairs

Organizations

- Latino Victory Fund
- PODER PAC
- Puerto Rico Democrats
Benjie Wimberly (withdrawn)

Local officials

- Robert Artis, Prospect Park council member (2012-present)
- Ruby Cotton, Paterson 4th Ward council member (2012-present)
- Michael Johnson, mayor of Haledon (2023-present)
- Dr. Lilisa Mimms, Paterson at-large council member (2018-present)
- MD Ford Uddin, Paterson at-large council member (2022-present)

Labor unions

- IBEW Local 102
Shavonda Sumter (withdrawn)

U.S. representatives

- Jennifer McClellan, VA-04 (2023-present)

Party officials

- ~~John Currie, Passaic County Democratic chair and former New Jersey Democratic Party chair (2013–2021)~~ (Sumter's godfather, switched endorsement to Pou)

Labor unions

- Communications Workers of America Local 1037
- Retail, Wholesale and Department Store Union Local 108

==== Forums ====
Forums among candidates for the replacement Democratic nomination for the 9th congressional district in New Jersey
No.	Date and time	Place	Host	Moderator	Link	Participants			
P Present A Absent I Invited N Not invited W Withdrawn						Pou	Sayegh	Sumter	Wimberly
1	August 26, 2024; 8 pm EST	Livestreamed	New Jersey Globe; On New Jersey; Rebovich Institute	Laura Jones		P	W	P	P

==== Polling ====
Hypothetical polling

Poll source	Date(s) administered	Sample size	Margin of error	Clinton Calabrese	Nellie Pou	Andre Sayegh	Shavonda Sumter	Benjie Wimberly
CAIR Action/Unity and Justice Fund	August 24–25, 2024	383 (RV)	–	12%	11%	38%	13%	26%

=== Republican primary ===
==== Nominee ====
- Billy Prempeh, sales consultant and nominee for this district in 2020 and 2022

==== Eliminated in primary ====
- Hector Castillo, physician and perennial candidate

==== Withdrawn ====
- Vince Micco, commercial lending executive, former executive director of the Bergen County Republican Party, and nominee for this district in 2006 and 2008

==== Endorsements ====
Billy Prempeh

Political parties

- Bergen County Republican Party
- Passaic County Republican Party

=== Fundraising ===
Campaign finance reports as of May 15, 2024
Candidate	Raised	Spent	Cash on hand
Hector Castillo (R)	$55,100 (Note: $50,500 of this total was self-funded by Castillo)	$44,280	$10,819
Billy Prempeh (R)	$14,323	$9,529	$4,034
Source: Federal Election Commission

==== Results ====
Republican primary results
Party	Candidate	Votes	%
Republican	Billy Prempeh	11,504	72.6
Republican	Hector Castillo	4,352	27.4
Total votes		15,856	100.0

=== General election ===
==== Predictions ====
Source	Ranking	As of
Cook Political Report	Solid D	March 21, 2024
Inside Elections	Solid D	September 15, 2023
Sabato's Crystal Ball	Safe D	September 26, 2023
Elections Daily	Safe D	September 7, 2023
CNalysis	Solid D	November 16, 2023
Decision Desk HQ	Safe D	October 7, 2024

==== Results ====
2024 New Jersey's 9th congressional district election
Party	Candidate	Votes	%
Democratic	Nellie Pou	130,514	50.8
Republican	Billy Prempeh	117,939	45.9
Green	Benjamin Taylor	5,027	1.9
Libertarian	Bruno Pereira	3,533	1.4
Total votes		257,013	100.0
Democratic hold			

==== By county ====
County	Nellie Pou Democratic		Billy Prempeh Republican		Various candidates Other parties		Margin		Total votes cast
County	#	%	#	%	#	%	#	%	Total votes cast
Bergen (part)	57,505	46.49%	62,437	50.47%	3,764	3.04%	−4,932	−3.99%	123,706
Hudson (part)	9,287	51.90%	7,958	44.47%	649	3.63%	1,329	7.43%	17,894
Passaic (part)	63,722	55.11%	47,544	41.12%	4,369	3.78%	16,178	13.99%	115,635
Totals	130,514	50.74%	117,939	45.85%	8,782	3.41%	12,575	4.89%	257,235

== District 10 ==
2024 New Jersey's 10th congressional district election
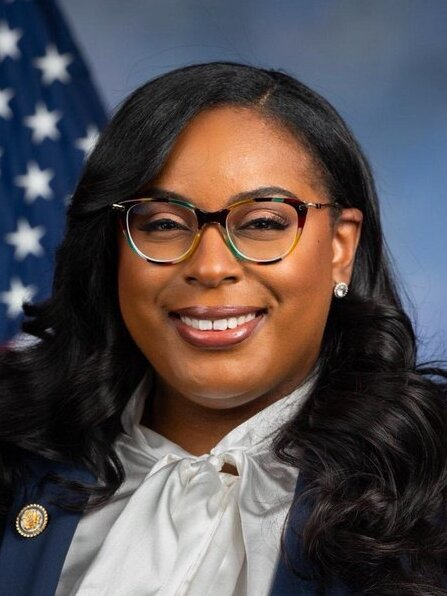

Nominee	LaMonica McIver	Carmen Bucco
Party	Democratic	Republican
Popular vote	182,020	54,405
Percentage	74.4%	22.2%
- McIver: 50–60% 60–70% 70–80% 80–90% >90% Bucco: 40–50% 50–60% 60–70%
U.S. Representative before election
LaMonica McIver
Democratic
Elected U.S. Representative
LaMonica McIver
Democratic

The 10th district is centered around the state's most populous city of Newark, taking in the neighboring Irvington and Orange, with a plurality African American population. The seat became vacant when Democrat Donald Payne Jr., who was re-elected with 77.6% of the vote in 2022, died on April 24, 2024. A special election was held on September 18, with Democrat LaMonica McIver being elected with 81.4% of the vote.

=== Democratic primary ===
==== Nominee ====
- Donald Payne Jr., incumbent U.S. representative (died April 24, 2024; remained on ballot)

==== Endorsements ====
Donald Payne Jr. (deceased)

Political parties

- Union County Democratic Party

Organizations

- Feminist Majority PAC
- Humane Society Legislative Fund
- J Street PAC
- League of Conservation Voters
- Natural Resources Defense Council

Labor unions

- International Federation of Professional and Technical Engineers
- National Education Association

==== Fundraising ====
Campaign finance reports as of March 31, 2024
Candidate	Raised	Spent	Cash on hand
Donald Payne Jr. (D)	$435,095	$374,384	$109,060
Source: Federal Election Commission

==== Results ====
Democratic primary results
Party	Candidate	Votes	%
Democratic	Donald Payne Jr. † (incumbent)	30,180	100.0
Total votes		30,180	100.0

==== Replacement nominee selection ====
Payne posthumously won the Democratic primary, as he was the only candidate on the ballot. Democratic county committee members in Essex, Hudson, and Union counties met on July 18 to choose a replacement nominee.

===== Replacement nominee =====
- LaMonica McIver, president of the Newark Municipal Council (2022–2024) from the Central Ward (2018–present) and nominee for this district in the September special election

===== Eliminated at convention =====
- Derek Armstead, mayor of Linden (2014–present) and Linden Democratic municipal chair
- John Flora, teacher and candidate for this district in 2020
- Shana Melius, former constituent services staffer to Donald Payne Jr.
- Sheila Montague, teacher and candidate for mayor of Newark in 2022
- Craig Stanley, former state assemblyman from the 28th district (1996–2008) and cousin of former U.S. representative Donald Payne Jr.
- Jerry Walker, Hudson County commissioner from the 3rd district (2018–present) and candidate for mayor of Jersey City in 2013

===== Disqualified =====
- Brittany Claybrooks, former East Orange city councilor (2019–2023)
- Debra Salters, community activist and independent candidate for New Jersey's 29th assembly district in 2021

===== Declined =====
- Ras Baraka, mayor of Newark (2014–present) (running for governor in 2025, endorsed McIver)
- Ronald Slaughter, pastor (endorsed McIver)

===== Results =====
Special Democratic convention results
Party	Candidate	Votes	%
Democratic	LaMonica McIver	337	79.1
Democratic	Derek Armstead	43	10.1
Democratic	Jerry Walker	18	4.2
Democratic	Craig Stanley	13	3.1
Democratic	John Flora	6	1.4
Democratic	Shana Melius	5	1.2
Democratic	Sheila Montague	4	0.9
Total votes		426	100.0

=== Republican primary ===
==== Nominee ====
- Carmen Bucco, businessman and perennial candidate

==== Endorsements ====
Carmen Bucco

Political parties

- Union County Republican Party

Organizations

- New Jersey Right to Life

==== Fundraising ====
Campaign finance reports as of May 15, 2024
Candidate	Raised	Spent	Cash on hand
Carmen Bucco (R)	$9,070	$825	$8,245
Source: Federal Election Commission

==== Results ====
Republican primary results
Party	Candidate	Votes	%
Republican	Carmen Bucco	5,264	100.0
Total votes		5,264	100.0

=== Independents ===
==== Declared ====
- Michelle Middleton, candidate for Newark City Council in 2022

=== General election ===
==== Predictions ====
Source	Ranking	As of
Cook Political Report	Solid D	March 21, 2024
Inside Elections	Solid D	September 15, 2023
Sabato's Crystal Ball	Safe D	September 26, 2023
Elections Daily	Safe D	September 7, 2023
CNalysis	Solid D	November 16, 2023
Decision Desk HQ	Safe D	October 7, 2024

==== Results ====
2024 New Jersey's 10th congressional district election
Party	Candidate	Votes	%
Democratic	LaMonica McIver (incumbent)	182,020	74.4
Republican	Carmen Bucco	54,405	22.2
Green	Jon Serrano	3,198	1.3
Independent	Cynthia Johnson	2,132	0.9
Independent	Michelle Middleton	1,686	0.7
Independent	Donna Weiss	1,136	0.5
Total votes		244,577	100.0
Democratic hold			

==== By county ====
County	LaMonica McIver Democratic		Carmen Bucco Republican		Various candidates Other parties		Margin		Total votes cast
County	#	%	#	%	#	%	#	%	Total votes cast
Essex (part)	105,687	81.38%	20,359	15.68%	3,819	2.94%	85,328	65.71%	129,865
Hudson (part)	26,950	72.87%	7,469	20.19%	2,567	6.94%	19,481	52.67%	36,986
Union (part)	49,383	63.34%	26,577	34.09%	2,007	2.57%	22,806	29.25%	77,967
Totals	182,020	74.35%	54,405	22.22%	8,393	3.43%	127,615	52.13%	244,818

== District 11 ==
2024 New Jersey's 11th congressional district election
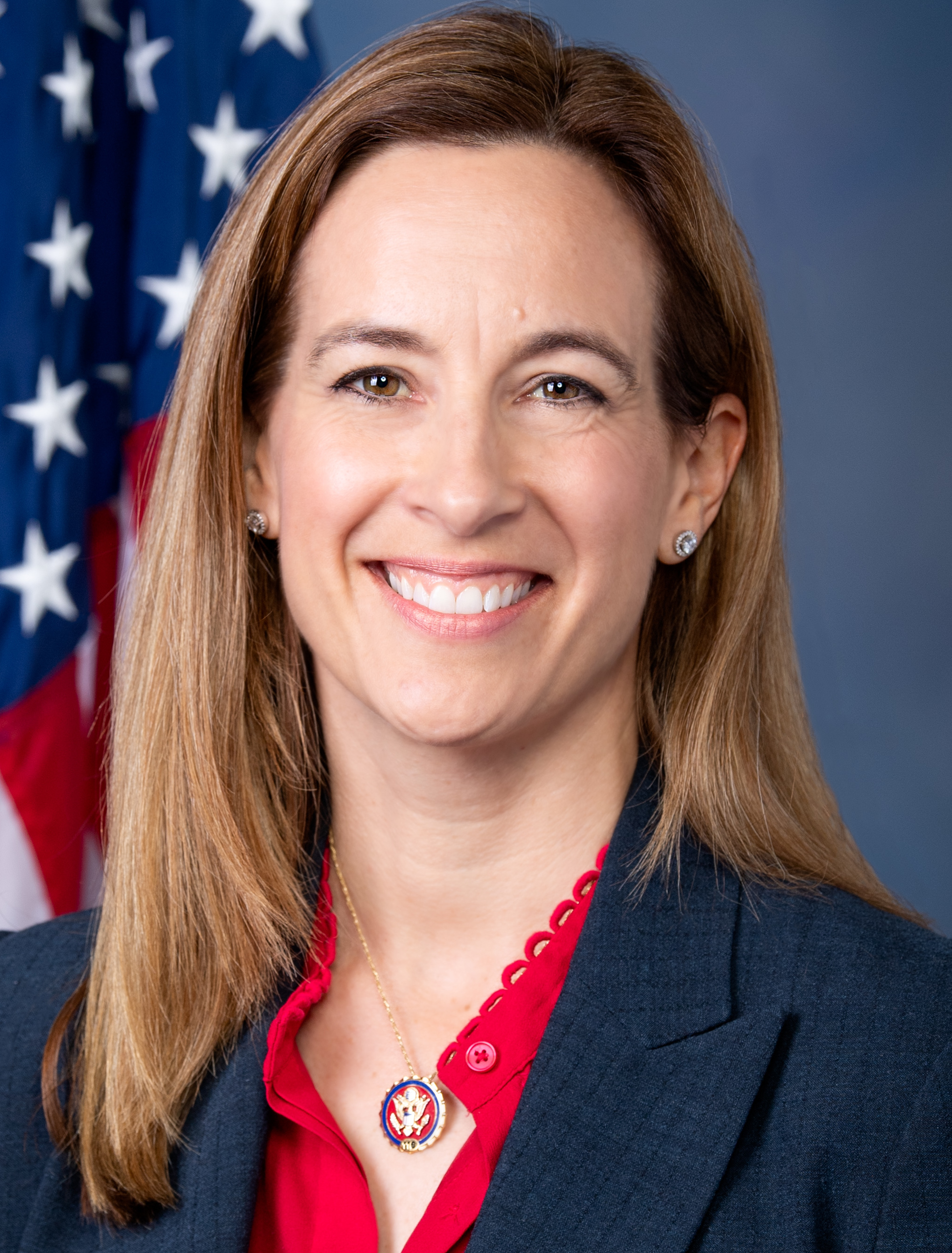

Nominee	Mikie Sherrill	Joseph Belnome
Party	Democratic	Republican
Popular vote	222,583	164,556
Percentage	56.5%	41.8%
- Sherrill: 40–50% 50–60% 60–70% 70–80% 80–90% >90% Belnome: 40–50% 50–60% 60–70% 70–80% Tie: 40–50%
U.S. Representative before election
Mikie Sherrill
Democratic
Elected U.S. Representative
Mikie Sherrill
Democratic

The 11th district is centered in Morris County and includes the outer suburbs of the New York metropolitan area, including Montclair and Morristown. The incumbent was Democrat Mikie Sherrill, who was re-elected with 59.0% of the vote in 2022.

=== Democratic primary ===
==== Nominee ====
- Mikie Sherrill, incumbent U.S. representative

==== Eliminated in primary ====
- Mark De Lotto, real estate consultant

==== Endorsements ====
Mikie Sherrill

U.S representatives

- Seth Moulton, U.S. representative from Massachusetts's 6th congressional district (2015–present)

Political parties

- Morris County Democratic Party

Organizations

- AIPAC
- Democratic Majority for Israel
- Everytown for Gun Safety Action Fund
- Feminist Majority PAC
- Humane Society Legislative Fund
- Joint Action Committee for Political Affairs
- National Women's Political Caucus
- Natural Resources Defense Council
- Planned Parenthood Action Fund
- With Honor Fund

Labor unions

- National Education Association
Declined to endorse

U.S. representatives

- Andy Kim, U.S. representative from New Jersey's 3rd congressional district (2019–present)

==== Fundraising ====
Campaign finance reports as of May 15, 2024
Candidate	Raised	Spent	Cash on hand
Mikie Sherrill (D)	$2,672,032	$2,033,567	$1,256,661
Source: Federal Election Commission

==== Results ====
Democratic primary results
Party	Candidate	Votes	%
Democratic	Mikie Sherrill (incumbent)	48,539	93.6
Democratic	Mark De Lotto	3,309	6.4
Total votes		51,848	100.0

=== Republican primary ===
==== Nominee ====
- Joseph Belnome, Belleville building inspector and nominee for SD-34 in 2023

==== Eliminated in primary ====
- Raafat Barsoom, physician and perennial candidate
- John Sauers, accountant

==== Withdrawn ====
- Toby Anderson, businessman and candidate for this district in 2022

==== Endorsements ====
Raafat Barsoom

Organizations

- New Jersey Right to Life
Joseph Belnome

Political parties

- Morris County Republican Party
- Passaic County Republican Party

==== Fundraising ====
Campaign finance reports as of May 15, 2024
Candidate	Raised	Spent	Cash on hand
Raafat Barsoom (R)	$22,123 (Note: $22,000 of this total was self-funded by Castillo)	$21,245	$877
Joseph Belnome (R)	$56,698	$6,935	$49,762
John Sauers (R)	$5,104	$3,680	$1,424
Source: Federal Election Commission

==== Results ====
Republican primary results
Party	Candidate	Votes	%
Republican	Joseph Belnome	25,608	86.8
Republican	John Sauers	2,425	8.2
Republican	Raafat Barsoom	1,464	5.0
Total votes		29,497	100.0

=== General election ===
==== Predictions ====
Source	Ranking	As of
Cook Political Report	Solid D	March 21, 2024
Inside Elections	Solid D	September 15, 2023
Sabato's Crystal Ball	Safe D	September 26, 2023
Elections Daily	Safe D	September 7, 2023
CNalysis	Solid D	November 16, 2023
Decision Desk HQ	Safe D	October 7, 2024

==== Results ====
2024 New Jersey's 11th congressional district election
Party	Candidate	Votes	%
Democratic	Mikie Sherrill (incumbent)	222,583	56.5
Republican	Joseph Belnome	164,556	41.8
Green	Lily Benavides	4,780	1.2
Independent	Joshua Lanzara	1,832	0.5
Total votes		393,751	100.0
Democratic hold			

==== By county ====
County	Mikie Sherrill Democratic		Joseph Belnome Republican		Various candidates Other parties		Margin		Total votes cast
County	#	%	#	%	#	%	#	%	Total votes cast
Essex (part)	99,674	66.82%	46,944	31.47%	2,545	1.71%	52,730	35.35%	149,163
Morris (part)	105,447	51.35%	96,899	47.19%	3,002	1.46%	8,548	4.16%	205,348
Passaic (part)	17,462	44.32%	20,713	52.57%	1,227	3.11%	−3,251	−8.25%	39,402
Totals	222,583	56.51%	164,556	41.77%	6,774	1.72%	58,027	14.73%	393,913

== District 12 ==
2024 New Jersey's 12th congressional district election
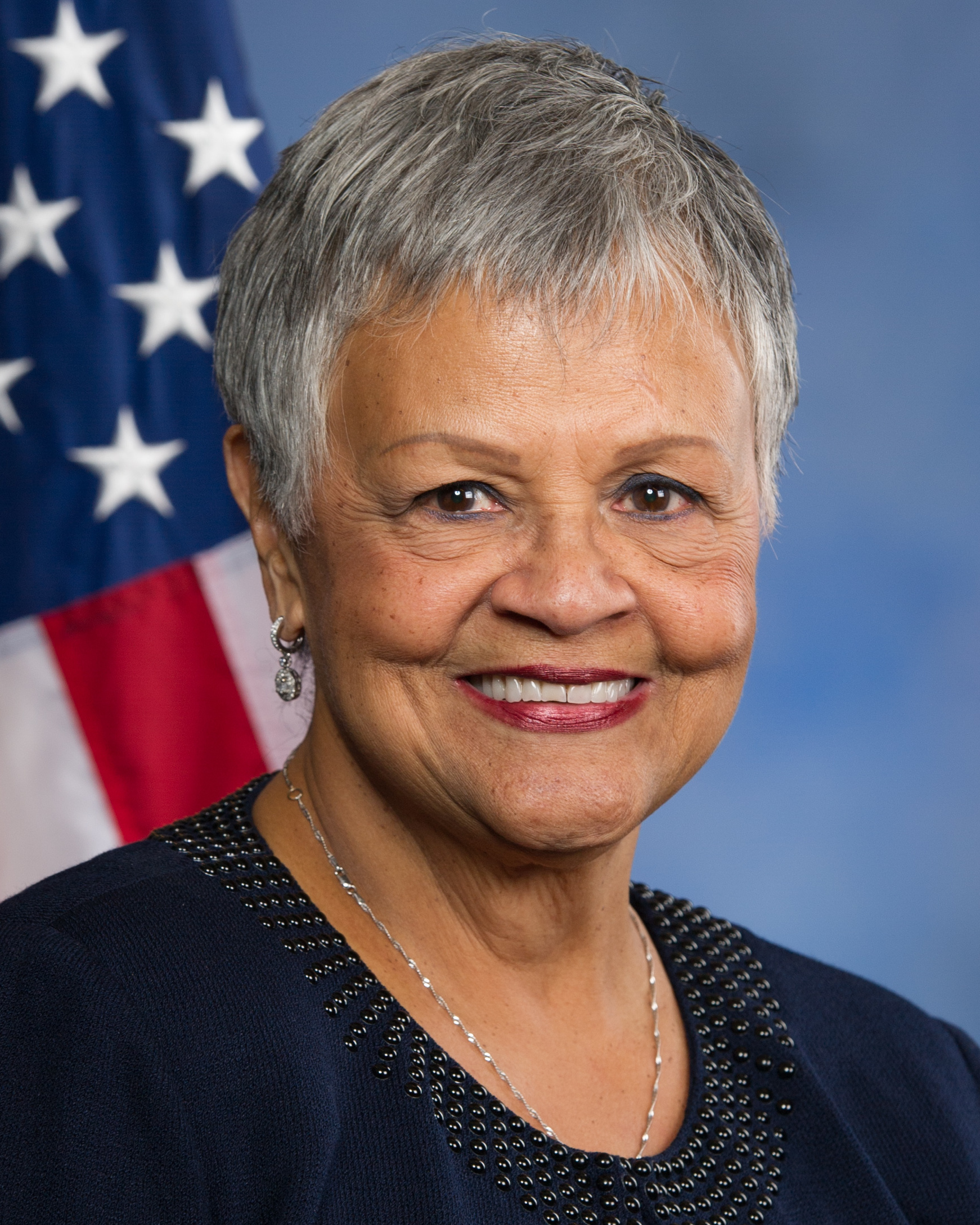

Nominee	Bonnie Watson Coleman	Darius Mayfield
Party	Democratic	Republican
Popular vote	196,871	117,222
Percentage	61.2%	36.4%
- Watson Coleman: 50–60% 60–70% 70–80% 80–90% Mayfield: 50–60% 60–70%
U.S. Representative before election
Bonnie Watson Coleman
Democratic
Elected U.S. Representative
Bonnie Watson Coleman
Democratic

The 12th district is composed of much of Central Jersey, taking in the state capital Trenton and neighboring Princeton University, along with Plainfield to the north. The incumbent was Democrat Bonnie Watson Coleman, who was re-elected with 63.1% of the vote in 2022.

=== Democratic primary ===
==== Nominee ====
- Bonnie Watson Coleman, incumbent U.S. representative

==== Eliminated in primary ====
- Daniel Dart, former Princeton Public Schools board of education member (2019–2022)

==== Endorsements ====
Bonnie Watson Coleman

Political parties

- Mercer County Democratic Party
- Middlesex County Democratic Party
- Union County Democratic Party

Organizations

- Bend the Arc
- Feminist Majority PAC
- Humane Society Legislative Fund
- J Street PAC
- League of Conservation Voters
- National Organization for Women PAC
- National Women's Political Caucus
- Population Connection Action Fund
- Vote Common Good

Labor unions

- National Education Association
Declined to endorse

U.S. representatives

- Andy Kim, U.S. representative from New Jersey's 3rd congressional district (2019–present)

=== Fundraising ===
Campaign finance reports as of March 31, 2024
Candidate	Raised	Spent	Cash on hand
Bonnie Watson Coleman (D)	$671,543	$511,068	$229,117
Daniel Dart (D)	$142,812 (Note: $108,305 of this total was self-funded by Dart)	$103,700	$38,912
Source: Federal Election Commission

==== Results ====
Democratic primary results
Party	Candidate	Votes	%
Democratic	Bonnie Watson Coleman (incumbent)	43,510	86.8
Democratic	Daniel Dart	6,623	13.2
Total votes		50,133	100.0

=== Republican primary ===
==== Nominee ====
- Darius Mayfield, talent manager and nominee for this district in 2022

==== Withdrawn ====
- Thomas Jones Jr., North Plainfield School Board member (2022–present) (remained on ballot)

==== Endorsements ====
Darius Mayfield

Statewide officials

- Ken Blackwell, former Ohio Secretary of State (1999–2007)

Political parties

- Somerset County Republican Party
- Union County Republican Party

==== Fundraising ====
Campaign finance reports as of March 31, 2024
Candidate	Raised	Spent	Cash on hand
Darius Mayfield (R)	$35,576 (Note: $4,400 of this total was self-funded by Mayfield)	$36,615	$5,157
Source: Federal Election Commission

==== Results ====
Republican primary results
Party	Candidate	Votes	%
Republican	Darius Mayfield	14,753	84.4
Republican	Thomas Jones Jr. (withdrawn)	2,732	15.6
Total votes		17,485	100.0

=== General election ===
==== Predictions ====
Source	Ranking	As of
Cook Political Report	Solid D	March 21, 2024
Inside Elections	Solid D	September 15, 2023
Sabato's Crystal Ball	Safe D	September 26, 2023
Elections Daily	Safe D	September 7, 2023
CNalysis	Solid D	November 16, 2023
Decision Desk HQ	Safe D	October 7, 2024

==== Results ====
2024 New Jersey's 12th congressional district election
Party	Candidate	Votes	%
Democratic	Bonnie Watson Coleman (incumbent)	196,871	61.2
Republican	Darius Mayfield	117,222	36.4
Green	Kim Meudt	4,652	1.5
Libertarian	Vic Kaplan	2,915	0.9
Total votes		321,660	100.0
Democratic hold			

==== By county ====
County	Bonnie Watson Coleman Democratic		Darius Mayfield Republican		Various candidates Other parties		Margin		Total votes cast
County	#	%	#	%	#	%	#	%	Total votes cast
Mercer (part)	55,545	75.37%	17,147	23.27%	1,002	1.36%	38,398	52.10%	73,694
Middlesex (part)	79,902	52.46%	67,858	44.55%	4,544	2.98%	12,044	7.91%	152,304
Somerset (part)	50,435	60.91%	30,221	36.50%	2,142	2.59%	20,214	24.41%	82,798
Union (part)	10,989	82.73%	1,996	15.03%	298	2.24%	8,993	67.70%	13,283
Totals	196,871	61.13%	117,222	36.40%	7,986	2.48%	79,649	24.73%	322,079

== Notes ==
Partisan clients
