= Bridget Anne Kelly =

American political consultant

Deputy Chief of Staff to the Governor of New Jersey
- In office April 2013 – January 9, 2014
- Governor: Chris Christie
- Preceded by: Bill Stepien
- Succeeded by: Louis Goetting

Personal details
- Born: Bridget Anne Daul; September 8, 1972 (age 54) Ramsey, New Jersey, U.S.
- Party: Republican
- Spouse: Joseph Kelly (m. 1995; div. 2012)
- Children: 4
- Education: Mount St. Mary's University (BA)

Bridget Anne Kelly is the former deputy chief of staff to the Governor of New Jersey, Chris Christie, known for her participation in the Bridgegate scandal.

Kelly, a New Jersey native, grew up in Ramsey and graduated from Immaculate Heart Academy in 1990. She graduated from Mount St. Mary's University in 1994 with a Bachelor of Arts degree in political science.

== Career ==
Kelly began her government career by working as a legislative aide to Assemblyman David C. Russo, later becoming Russo's chief of staff. In 2010, Kelly became director of legislative relations under Governor Chris Christie. In April 2013, Christie appointed her to be his deputy chief of staff.

On November 4, 2016, Kelly was convicted for her involvement in the "Bridgegate" affair. She was sentenced to 18 months imprisonment (later reduced to 13 months) on March 29, 2017. On May 7, 2020, the United States Supreme Court, in a unanimous decision, overturned her conviction.

Kelly said that she looks forward to returning to government work at some point in the future saying, "I'd like to make sure that my Wikipedia page is not all about Bridgegate". In 2021, she ran for and failed to win the position of Bergen County Clerk.

== Fort Lee lane closure scandal ==
On November 4, 2016, Kelly was found guilty in connection with the four-day closures of entrance ramps to the George Washington Bridge in the late summer of 2013, in part of what has been described as politically motivated retribution against the mayor of Fort Lee, New Jersey.

On August 13, 2013, Kelly sent an eight-word e-mail to David Wildstein, a Christie appointee to the board of commissioners of the Port Authority of New York and New Jersey, that read, "Time for some traffic problems in Fort Lee." Wildstein responded to Kelly's e-mail: "Got it." In a texting exchange the next day, Wildstein relayed to Kelly a text from Fort Lee Mayor Mark Sokolich in which he complained about the traffic jam and said, "The bigger problem is getting kids to school. Please help. It's maddening."

=== Prosecution ===
On January 9, 2014, after the emails were disclosed, the governor announced that he had fired Kelly, calling her action "stupid" and "deceitful" and claiming her actions had caused him to mislead the public. That day, Kelly was named as a defendant in a federal class action lawsuit in the U.S. District Court for the District of New Jersey that cited a civil conspiracy and "willful, wanton, arbitrary, and egregious official misconduct". In the wake of her firing, police established no parking zones outside of Kelly's home in Ramsey to keep press and gawkers away, while "no trespassing" signs were placed on the lawn of the home.

When she received subpoenas for documents from the New Jersey legislative committee, Kelly's attorneys indicated she would not comply with the subpoenas, citing their clients' Fifth Amendment right against self-incrimination and Fourth Amendment right against unreasonable search and seizure The committee voted to compel Kelly to produce the previously requested documents, instructing special counsel Reid Schar to "take all necessary steps" to enforce them. But Superior Court Judge Mary Jacobson found no basis to force Kelly and Bill Stepien, the governor's two-time campaign manager, to comply with the subpoenas. The pair had objected to the requests, issued in January, asserting that being forced to identify and turn over records would violate their Fifth Amendment rights against self-incrimination. They called the committee's requests a fishing expedition. The Court agreed.

On May 1, 2015, Kelly was indicted on nine charges in connection with her involvement in the scandal. She pleaded not guilty. Courts have ruled that evidence provided in discovery by the US Attorney cannot be made public. Courts also ruled that all materials used to prepare the so-called Mastro Report which exonerated the Christie administration must be turned over to the defense. The state has denied Kelly's request for reimbursement of legal fees.

=== Courts ===
==== First trial ====
On November 4, 2016, the jury in the Bridgegate trial returned guilty verdicts on all counts against Bridget Kelly and her co-defendant, Bill Baroni. On March 29, 2017, U.S. District Judge Susan D. Wigenton sentenced Kelly to 18 months in prison and 500 hours of community service.

==== Third Circuit appeal ====
On November 27, 2018, the U.S. Court of Appeals for the Third Circuit upheld the majority of the convictions, overturned the determination that Kelly and Baroni had violated the civil rights of travelers, and found there is no established civil right to interstate travel that gives rise to a criminal conviction. The court directed for Kelly and Baroni to be resentenced on the remaining seven counts of the indictment. As a result, on April 24, 2019, Kelly was resentenced to one year and one month.

Following her sentencing in April 2019, Kelly said in a statement: "Mr. Christie, you are a bully and the days of you calling me a liar and destroying my life are over.... The truth will be heard—and for the former governor, that truth will be unescapable [sic], regardless of lucrative television deals or even future campaigns. I plan to make sure of that."

==== Supreme Court appeal ====
On June 28, 2019, two weeks away from beginning her custodial sentence, the United States Supreme Court agreed to take up her case, and her prison sentence was delayed pending its ruling. Political and legal commentators have noted that action by the Court as part of a continuingly "more stringent definition of the law" governing corruption cases involving political malfeasance.

Kelly's appeal was filed as Kelly v. United States, No. 18–1059. On May 7, 2020, the Supreme Court unanimously overturned Kelly's conviction, stating:

“For no reason other than political payback, Baroni and Kelly used deception to reduce Fort Lee’s access lanes to the George Washington Bridge—and thereby jeopardized the safety of the town’s residents. But not every corrupt act by state or local officials is a federal crime. Because the scheme here did not aim to obtain money or property, Baroni and Kelly could not have violated the federal-program fraud or wire fraud laws. We therefore reverse the judgment of the Court of Appeals and remand the case for further proceedings consistent with this opinion.”

In a written judgment, Justice Elena Kagan also noted that "not every corrupt act by state or local officials is a federal crime" and that "the realignment of the toll lanes was an exercise of regulatory power—something this Court has already held fails to meet the statutes' property requirement." They also considered that the prosecution had chosen an unrealistically-broad interpretation of wire fraud legislation.

=== Response ===
In response, Christie described his former team as having been "completely exonerated" and blamed prosecutors appointed by Barack Obama. Kelly told Reuters that she believed "while this may finally have made this case right for me, it does not absolve those who should have truly been held accountable." The ruling was described as "the latest instance in which the Supreme Court hemmed in prosecutors in corruption cases involving political figures." The Financial Times described the state of New Jersey as being "well versed in political corruption" but also that Bridgegate was a "particularly baroque" episode.

== Personal life ==
Kelly is a divorced mother of four and still resides in her childhood hometown of Ramsey.
