= Bill Stepien =

American political consultant

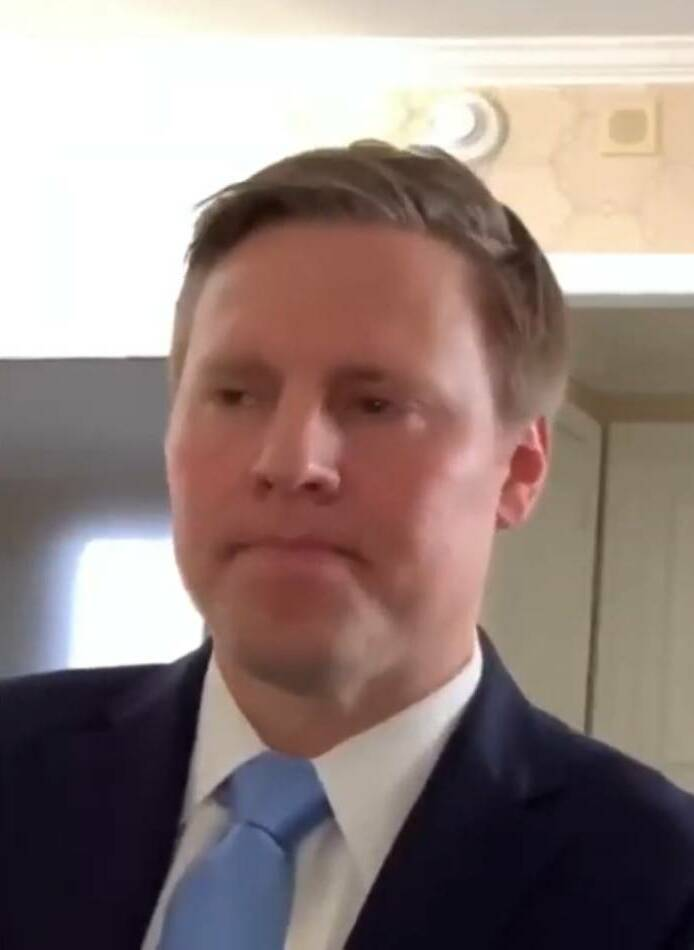
- Stepien in 2022

White House Director of Political Affairs
- In office January 20, 2017 – December 7, 2018
- President: Donald Trump
- Preceded by: David Simas
- Succeeded by: Brian Jack

Personal details
- Born: William Stepien
- Party: Republican
- Education: Rutgers University, New Brunswick (BA)

William Stepien is an American political consultant who served as the campaign manager for Donald Trump's 2020 presidential campaign beginning in July of that year. A member of the Republican Party, he was the White House Director of Political Affairs in the Trump administration from 2017 to 2018.

Stepien managed both of Chris Christie's New Jersey gubernatorial campaigns and served as his Deputy Chief of Staff before being fired in 2014, after Christie said he "lost confidence" in Stepien's judgment. This was due to Stepien's role in the Fort Lee lane closure scandal, also known as Bridgegate, in which he approved actions meant to embarrass a Democratic Party mayor.

== Early career ==
Born to a family of Polish and German origin, Stepien graduated from West Morris Central High School and Rutgers University in New Jersey. Stepien began his political career working on Anthony R. Bucco's successful 1997 New Jersey State Senate campaign, and then on Bob Franks' unsuccessful 2000 U.S. Senate race. He worked for Public Opinion Strategies and DuHaime Communications before managing Bill Baroni's 2003 bid for the New Jersey State Assembly, which saw Baroni become the only Republican to oust a Democratic incumbent that year.

Stepien served as political director of the 2004 Bush/Cheney election campaign in New Hampshire, and as Director of the Republican National Committee's 72-Hour Campaign in 2005 and 2006. In 2008, he was a regional campaign manager for Senator John McCain's presidential campaign before serving as National Field Director, a role in which he also served for New York Mayor Rudy Giuliani's presidential campaign in 2007–08. He served in the same role again for presidential candidate Donald Trump in the 2016 presidential election.

== Christie gubernatorial campaign and administration ==
Stepien served as campaign manager in Chris Christie's successful campaign for Governor of New Jersey in 2009. Christie's first major announcement after winning the election was the naming of four top staffers, including Stepien as a Deputy Chief of Staff for Legislative and Intergovernmental Affairs. In April 2013, Stepien resigned from that position to become the manager of Christie's re-election campaign. His replacement as Deputy Chief of Staff for Legislative and Intergovernmental Affairs was Bridget Anne Kelly.

On January 7, 2014, Christie announced that he wanted Stepien to take over the chairmanship of the New Jersey Republican Party from Sam Raia. On January 7, 2014, Christie said, "I’ve asked Bill Stepien to be our new State Party Chairman because no one better understands how to grow our party, communicate our message and, most importantly, win elections... Bill Stepien is the best Republican operative in the country, and New Jersey Republicans will be fortunate to have him leading our Party."

=== Fort Lee lane closure scandal ===
On January 9, two days after nominating Stepien for the chairmanship of the New Jersey Republican Party, Christie announced that he had "lost my confidence in Bill's judgment," and he asked Stepien to withdraw his name from consideration. The turnaround was a result of Stepien's work on Christie's re-election campaign, where he became embroiled in the Fort Lee lane closure scandal to the George Washington Bridge. This was enacted by Christie's staff as political retribution toward Mark Sokolich (D) the Mayor of Fort Lee, NJ for his failure to support Christie's campaign. The closure of the Fort Lee bridge entrance caused massive delays and gridlock in New Jersey traffic including that from Fort Lee. Bridget Anne Kelly (R) Deputy Chief of Staff for Christie and romantically involved with Stepien, Bill Baroni (R) Appointee to the Port Authority of New York and New Jersey, and David Wildstein (R) Appointee to the Port Authority of New York and New Jersey were all found guilty. Stepien was fired.

In the trial in September 2016 about the lanes closures, federal prosecution witness David Wildstein said that Stepien was aware of the lane closures as they were happening.

They eventually discovered that Stepien was also in a romantic relationship with Bridget Kelly, his replacement as Christie's deputy chief of staff. Their relationship lasted until August 2013, as the plan to close the lanes was being implemented. Though their personal relationship was over, Stepien was kept abreast of the lane closures and the intended fallout. It was the emails between Stepien and those involved in the lane closures that sealed his fate. Christie said, "I was disturbed by the tone and behavior and attitude of callous indifference that was displayed in the emails by my former campaign manager, Bill Stepien."

Stepien then received a subpoena to submit documents to the New Jersey Legislature panel investigating the lane closures. In a 19-page letter sent to Reid Schar, Special Counsel to the joint Senate and Assembly committee, Stepien's lawyer cited Stepien's Fifth Amendment privilege against compelled self-incrimination, noting that in addition to the legislative probe, a federal criminal inquiry into the lane closures was also underway.

Judge Jacobson of the New Jersey Superior Court ruled that Stepien was not required to comply with the legislative subpoenas to produce documents since they were written too broadly, and he was also protected under the Fifth Amendment. In May his lawyer also contended that a report produced on behalf of the Governor's Office misrepresented his client.

Two months after being fired, Stepien made a "soft landing" at the data and phone bank giant FLS Connect, which hired him to work on sales and strategy.

== Nassau Strategies ==
Stepien's firm, Nassau Strategies LLC, is based out of a residential home on Knob Hill Road in Washington Township, Morris County, New Jersey. The firm benefited from Christie's chairmanship of the Republican Governors Association, as did many other New Jersey–based consulting firms. In December 2013, the RGA paid Stepien's firm $15,000, (~$20,732 in 2025) just a month before Christie cut ties with Stepien. On December 8, 2014, GOPAC made a retainer payment of $6,000 to Nassau Strategies for political strategy consulting.

== Trump's campaign and administration ==
In August 2016 Stepien was hired to work for Donald Trump's 2016 presidential campaign. Stepien was named the White House political director on January 20, 2017. In December 2018, Stepien and White House Director of Public Liaison Justin Clark were named Senior Political Advisors to the President's re-election campaign focusing on delegate and party organization.

In 2019, Stepien, along with Trump, worked to convince New Jersey Democratic congressman Jeff Van Drew to switch to the Republican Party during the first impeachment of Donald Trump. In December 2019, Van Drew hired Stepien as an adviser to his 2020 re-election campaign. On July 15, 2020, Trump announced Stepien's promotion to campaign manager for Trump's 2020 presidential campaign, replacing Brad Parscale.

On October 2, 2020, Stepien tested positive for COVID-19.

Stepien was involved in the Stop the Steal effort, including spreading false information about voting machines despite a staff memo finding the allegations were false.

== Post-2020 career ==
After the 2020 election, Stepien, along with two former members of the Trump 2020 presidential campaign, Justin Clark and Nick Trainer, formed a political consultancy firm, National Public Affairs. As of June 2022, they were managing the campaign of Harriet Hageman, a Republican running against Representative Liz Cheney in 2022.

In 2024, Stepien was an advisor for Curtis Bashaw's campaign for US Senate.

== January 6 hearings ==
On June 13, 2022, Stepien was scheduled to testify in front of the United States House Select Committee on the January 6 Capitol Attack, but said he was unable to appear because his wife was in labor.

== See also ==
- Governorship of Chris Christie
- List of people involved in the Fort Lee lane closure scandal

Political offices
Preceded by David Simas	White House Director of Political Affairs; 2017–2018	Succeeded by Brian Jack
