= Alan Zegas =

American criminal defense attorney (born 1952)

Alan L. Zegas (born October 28, 1952) is an American criminal defense attorney. He was born in Newark, New Jersey, received a Bachelor of Science degree from The Wharton School at the University of Pennsylvania in 1974, an MBA from The Harvard Business School in 1978, and a J.D. from Rutgers School of Law-Newark in 1981. He said that he became a lawyer to defend the “little, powerless person against the powerful forces of government.”

He has law offices in Summit, New Jersey. The New Jersey Monthly magazine named Zegas as one of the "50 Most Interesting People in NJ". He was Editor-in-Chief of the Rutgers Law Review between 1980 and 1981, and clerked for judge H. Lee Sarokin of the U.S. District Court between 1981 and 1983.

== Notable cases ==
In 1989, Zegas represented one of the football players at Glen Ridge High School involved in the rape of a developmentally disabled female student, the only defendant that was acquitted of all substantive sexual assault charges.

Zegas participated in the case of Kelly Michaels in the Wee Care Nursery School abuse trial. Although Michaels was initially prosecuted, the decision was overturned in 1993, after she had spent five years in prison. Zegas represented Michaels on her appeal before the New Jersey Supreme Court, which overturned her conviction.

In 1999, Zegas won the acquittal of David Ford, a teacher who was accused of molesting a dozen girls. Prosecutors had described Ford as a sexual predator while Zegas said he was the victim of hysteria and rumors.

Zegas won an acquittal for Victor Botnick, a chief aide of late New York Mayor, Edward Koch, in a federal prosecution for air piracy in the United States District Court for the Eastern District of New York.

Zegas also represented former Newark Mayor, Sharpe James, in a federal prosecution in the United States District Court for the District of New Jersey.

In 2017, Zegas represented David Wildstein, one of the principal defendants in "Bridgegate" or the George Washington Bridge Lane Closure Case. Zegas obtained a probationary sentence for his client.

== Fort Lee lane closure scandal ==
In 2014, Zegas became prominent in the Fort Lee lane closure scandal as legal counsel to David Wildstein, indicating that his client would offer to shed light on the scandal on the condition that he is given immunity from prosecution.
