= David Simas =

CEO of the Obama Foundation

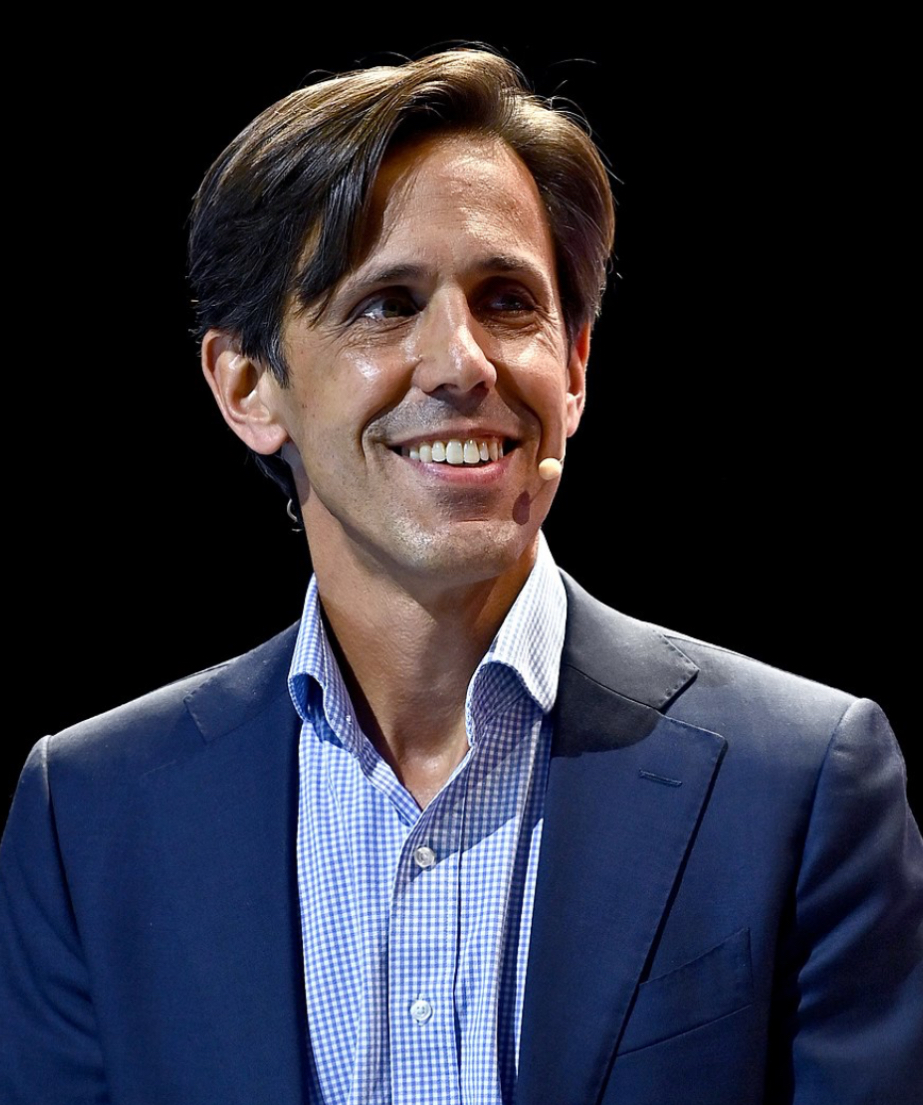
- Simas in 2021

White House Director of Political Affairs
- In office January 24, 2014 – December 19, 2016
- President: Barack Obama
- Preceded by: Patrick Gaspard (2011)
- Succeeded by: Bill Stepien

Personal details
- Born: David Matos Simas; January 5, 1970 (age 56) Taunton, Massachusetts, U.S.
- Party: Democratic
- Spouse: Shauna
- Children: 2
- Education: Stonehill College (BA); Boston College (JD)

David Matos Simas (born January 5, 1970) is an American lawyer, former government official, and a former politician. He was the President of the Obama Foundation from 2021 to 2023, having previously served as its CEO from 2016 to 2021 and served in Barack Obama's administration as the White House Director of Political Affairs from 2014 to 2016.

== Early life and education ==
Simas was born and raised in Taunton, Massachusetts, the son of Portuguese American immigrant parents, António and Deolinda Simas. Deolinda lost two of her fingers in a faulty machine at the silver factory where she worked when David was a child. The Portuguese immigrant lawyer who worked on the case inspired David to become a lawyer. He attended Coyle and Cassidy High School and earned a Bachelor of Arts degree from Stonehill College. He later earned a Juris Doctor from the Boston College Law School in 1995.

== Career ==
Simas began his political career working as an intern in Senator Edward M. Kennedy's office in 1989. He was later elected to the Taunton School Board in 1993 and the Taunton City Council in 1997 and 1999. He later served as president of the council and worked as an advisor to the mayor of Taunton.

After leaving the city council he served as an assistant register of deeds for the Northern district office of the Bristol County Registry of Deeds. He was later elected as the new Register of Deeds of the Northern district of Bristol County in 2004. He won reelection in 2006 but later resigned to accept a position in Governor Deval Patrick's administration.

He formerly served as deputy general counsel to the Massachusetts House of Representatives Post Audit and Oversight Bureau and practiced law with the law firm of Gay & Gay Associates, PC.

He worked as deputy chief of staff to Massachusetts Governor Deval Patrick from 2007 until 2009. In 2009, he joined the Obama White House as a deputy assistant to the president, working under Senior Advisor David Axelrod.

He worked as director of opinion research for President Obama's 2012 re-election campaign and then served as a liaison between the president and Democratic officials for two and a half years.

Simas was appointed CEO of the Obama Foundation in December 2016. In 2025, Simas was a fellow at the USC Center for the Political Future.

== Personal life ==
Simas married his high school sweetheart, Shauna. They have two daughters and live in Los Angeles, CA.

Government offices
Vacant Title last held by Patrick Gaspard; 2011	White House Director of Political Affairs; 2014–2016	Succeeded by Bill Stepien
