= David Wildstein =

American writer and political figure

Mayor of Livingston, New Jersey
- In office 1987–1988

Member of the Livingston Township Council
- In office 1985–1988

Personal details
- Born: September 1961 (age 65)
- Party: Republican
- Education: Livingston High School
- Occupation: Writer; blogger; politician
- Writing career
- Pen name: Wally Edge
- Subject: Political news

David Wildstein (born September 1961) (Note: Several sources published in December 2013 or January 2014 said Wildstein was 52 at the time. For example, see) is an American businessman, former Republican Party politician, and the founder and editor-in-chief of the New Jersey political news website New Jersey Globe. A former mayor of Livingston, New Jersey, he served as a senior official in the Port Authority of New York and New Jersey during the administration of New Jersey Governor Chris Christie until 2013, when Wildstein resigned in the midst of a scandal involving traffic lanes closures. On May 1, 2015, he pleaded guilty to two federal felony counts of conspiracy as part of a plea agreement, but his conviction was later overturned.

== Early life and early political career ==
Wildstein grew up in a Jewish family in Livingston, New Jersey.

Wildstein's lifelong involvement with politics began early. At age 12, he was mentioned by a local newspaper as having left a group backing one congressional candidate in order to throw his support behind the candidate's opponent, Thomas Kean Sr., then a member of the state Assembly and a neighbor of Wildstein. (Kean lost the Republican primary to Millicent Fenwick, but later became governor of New Jersey, serving from 1982 to 1990.)

Wildstein attended Livingston High School in the late 1970s, where he was a classmate (one year ahead) of future governor Chris Christie. Christie has said that although he knew who Wildstein was and that both of them had worked on Thomas Kean's campaign for governor in 1977, Christie and Wildstein were not close acquaintances in high school: "We didn't travel in the same circles in high school. You know, I was the class president and athlete. I don't know what David was doing during that period of time." Christie and Wildstein were both members of the school's baseball team; Christie was a catcher, Wildstein was the team's statistician. In an interview published in 2014, the team's coach recalled that Wildstein was "a very quiet, unassuming, brilliant kid" with "a brilliant mind for numbers and figures" although not a skilled player.

At 16, Wildstein filed a lawsuit in a failed attempt to get on the ballot as a member of the county Republican Committee. The following year, he ran in the local school board election, although he was legally too young to have served on the school board. (Note: One source says he won a seat on the school board.) Still a high school student at the time, Wildstein was accused by his social studies teacher of having deceptively encouraged his teacher to sign a letter of support that was published in the local newspaper. They later issued a joint statement describing the episode as a misunderstanding.

After graduating from high school, Wildstein attended college in Washington, D.C., working on a presidential campaign and as a political consultant while a student. He served as executive director of the New Jersey Legislature's Legislative Caucus on Israel to deal with Jewish-related foreign policy, according to a 1983 JTA report.

Over the course of his political career, he worked for a number of other New Jersey Republican politicians, including two congressmen, Chris Smith and Bob Franks.

At 23, he was elected to a four-year term on the town council, serving from 1985 to 1988. He then served as mayor of Livingston from 1987 to 1988. Some considered his personal style in local politics at the time aggressive and combative, and he alienated even some members of his own party. He was very outspoken on some issues, including his opposition to low-income housing in Livingston, which he said was wasting the county government's money. After placing poorly in a primary election, he vowed to stay out of local politics in the future.

He began working as a top executive in the family's Georgia-based textile manufacturing business, Apache Mills, one of the country's largest floor mat manufacturers. Wildstein worked at the company from 1988 to 2007.

== Political writer and publisher ==
=== PolitickerNJ ===
New Jersey Globe
- Website type: News website
- Available in: English
- Editor: David Wildstein
- Website: newjerseyglobe.com

In 2000, while still working at the family business, Wildstein secretly founded a New Jersey political news site called PoliticsNJ.com (since renamed PolitickerNJ.com), which he ran with the financial support of his friend New Jersey real estate mogul Jared Kushner, who publishes The New York Observer. Wildstein wrote a blog on New Jersey politics for the site using the pseudonym "Wally Edge", after the former New Jersey Republican governor and United States senator Walter E. Edge. The site published news, political commentary, and rumors based on anonymous tips from government officials and political operatives. Wildstein's true identity as the blog's author was only revealed in 2010 when he was appointed by the Christie administration to work at Port Authority.

Several journalists credit Wildstein with having helped launch their careers while they worked at PolitickerNJ.com, including Politico reporter Alex Isenstadt; Boston Globe reporter James Pindell, a former political director at WMUR in New Hampshire; Cook Political Report analyst Dave Wasserman; political and sports cartoonist Rob Tornoe; and Steve Kornacki, who hosts a cable television political news commentary program on MSNBC. Kornacki has said of Wildstein, "I've never met anybody ... with more thorough institutional knowledge of New Jersey politics."

=== New Jersey Globe ===
New Jersey Globe was founded by Wildstein in early 2018. It is a news website with original reporting and analysis on New Jersey politics that was founded as part of Sea of Reeds Media. The editor-in-chief is Wildstein.

== Port Authority tenure ==
The Port Authority of New York and New Jersey is a congressionally-authorized joint venture between the states of New Jersey and New York which manages much of the regional transportation infrastructure, including bridges, tunnels, airports, and seaports. Senior staff at the agency are appointed by the governors of the two states.

In 2010, Wildstein was appointed by newly installed Governor Chris Christie's senior representative at the Port Authority, Bill Baroni, to serve as the agency's Director of Interstate Capital Projects, making Wildstein the second highest-ranking Christie political appointee among the agency's executives, after Baroni himself. This position had never existed at the Port Authority prior to Wildstein's appointment and had no job description, but drew an annual salary of $150,020.

The Record's Shawn Boburg, who wrote a March 2012 profile about Wildstein based on interviews with then-current and past Port Authority colleagues, described Wildstein as the governor's "eyes and ears" at the agency, watching the entire agency, as one informant put it, for "strict adherence to the Christie agenda". Boburg has said Wildstein "made a point to stay in the shadows and be the person directing the show from behind the curtains" and "was known for walking the halls, monitoring other executives." Wildstein "was wildly feared and admired for his work ethic, his intelligence, and his political savvy."

=== Fort Lee bridge lane closure scandal ===
The George Washington Bridge, which connects the city of Fort Lee, New Jersey with New York City and is one of the busiest bridges in the world, is managed by the Port Authority.

From September 9 through September 13, 2013, two of the three lanes providing local access to a Fort Lee entrance to the bridge were closed on Wildstein's orders without notification of local government officials, emergency responders, or other Port Authority officials, resulting in massive traffic congestion and delays for the community of Fort Lee. Some local officials and political commentators speculated that Wildstein and associates in the Christie administration had ordered the lane closures as political retribution against the Democratic mayor of Fort Lee, or other members of the Democratic Party who represent Fort Lee.

In early December 2013, just days before the state legislature was scheduled to begin hearings to investigate the lane closures, Wildstein announced his resignation, saying he had planned to leave the agency the following year but "the Fort Lee issue has been a distraction, and I think it's better to move on earlier." Under subpoena from the legislature ordering him to produce documents related to the lane closures, Wildstein turned over emails and text messages that showed Christie administration aides discussing the lane closures. In an eight-word email, Christie's deputy chief of staff, Bridget Anne Kelly, wrote to Wildstein in August 2013, "Time for some traffic problems in Fort Lee." Wildstein replied "Got it" one minute later.

When New York appointees at the Port Authority, who had not been notified that the lanes would be closed, reopened the lanes, Wildstein told Kelly that the Port Authority's chair, also an appointee of Christie, was "helping us to retaliate." In an email exchange about fallout over the lane closures between Wildstein and Christie's campaign chief and closest political confidante, Bill Stepien, Wildstein wrote, "It will be a tough November for this little Serbian," apparently referring to Fort Lee's Democratic mayor, Mark Sokolich (who is actually of Croatian, not Serbian, ancestry).

Called to testify before a state Assembly committee investigating the lanes closure in January 2014, Wildstein invoked his Fifth Amendment right against self-incrimination and refused to answer the committee members' questions. The committee found him in contempt and referred the case for prosecution. Wildstein's attorney Alan Zegas said that Wildstein would answer any questions if granted immunity from prosecution.

On January 31, 2014, a letter from counsel for Wildstein alleged that, in contrast to Christie's public assertions, the governor knew of the lane closures while they were happening in September 2013 and suggested that Wildstein had documents to prove his claims.

==== Guilty plea and cooperation with federal prosecutors ====
Wildstein pleaded guilty in federal district court in Newark, New Jersey to two felony counts of conspiracy—one count of conspiracy to misapply property of the Port Authority and one count of conspiracy to violate the civil rights of Fort Lee residents in the September 2013 lane closings—as part of a plea agreement with federal prosecutors. He was later sentenced to three years of probation.

The plea agreement was signed on January 12, 2015, and publicly released on May 1, 2015, when Wildstein formally entered his guilty plea in court before Judge Susan D. Wigenton. Wildstein's attorney confirmed that he had been cooperating with federal investigators for some months. On the same day, William E. "Bill" Baroni (then the deputy executive directory of the Port Authority) and Bridget Anne Kelly (then deputy chief of staff to Governor Chris Christie) were indicted on nine counts each in connection with the scandal. Kelly denied any responsibility for the Bridgegate scandal—saying "I am not guilty for the crimes for which I've been accused"—and said: "David Wildstein is a liar."

In the plea hearing, Wildstein admitted that he had conspired with Baroni and Kelly to shut down the lanes and cause significant traffic problems in retribution for Sokolich's decision not to endorse Christie for reelection. In return for his cooperation with federal prosecutors, Wildstein was released on a $100,000 personal recognizance bond before his sentencing hearing. Sentencing of Wildstein was originally scheduled for August 2015, but it was delayed until after the trial of Baroni and Kelly, who had pleaded not guilty. According to the Bergen County Record, "Federal prosecutors routinely postpone sentencing of government cooperators who have pleaded guilty until after the trial for which they are a potential witness so that the extent of their cooperation may be considered by the judge" at their own sentencing.

The trial of Baroni and Kelly finally began on September 19, 2016. As part of Wildstein's plea agreement, he testified against both defendants, becoming a "key witness" in the proceeding. During the trial, Wildstein testified that Christie and Baroni were aware of the plan while the closures were taking place. Baroni and Kelly were convicted on all counts on November 14, 2016.

Baroni was sentenced to 2 years in prison and Kelly to 18 months, with both maintaining their innocence and stating their intention to appeal.

Wildstein, who had been facing a potential of 21 to 27 months in federal prison, was sentenced to three years of probation on July 12, 2017.

Baroni and Kelly later appealed their convictions to the US Supreme Court, which unanimously overturned their conviction of fraud since no money was involved.

Justice Elena Kagan wrote, in the court's opinion: “For no reason other than political payback, Baroni and Kelly used deception to reduce Fort Lee’s access lanes to the George Washington Bridge—and thereby jeopardized the safety of the town’s residents. But not every corrupt act by state or local officials is a federal crime. Because the scheme here did not aim to obtain money or property, Baroni and Kelly could not have violated the federal-program fraud or wire fraud laws. We therefore reverse the judgment of the Court of Appeals and remand the case for further proceedings consistent with this opinion.”

== See also ==
- Governorship of Chris Christie
- List of people involved in the Fort Lee lane closure scandal
