= Rob Tornoe =

American cartoonist and writer (born 1978)

- Born: 1978 (age 47–48)
- Area: Cartoonist
- Notable works: The Philadelphia Inquirer; The Press of Atlantic City; The News Journal

Rob Tornoe is a cartoonist and writer, and is one of the last remaining sports cartoonists on staff at a newspaper. His sports cartoons appear in The Philadelphia Inquirer. He is also a political cartoonist and his cartoons appear in WHYY-FM, The Press of Atlantic City', The News Journal, and others. He has drawn political spoofs ranging from Al Gore to Peanuts. In addition to cartooning, Tornoe writes for Editor & Publisher and Poynter Institute about the media and the business of syndication.

== Education ==
Tornoe graduated from The Kubert School.

== Awards and recognition ==
Tornoe has won several awards for his editorial cartooning, including "Best Cartoon" by the New Jersey chapter of the Society of Professional Journalists in 2007 and second place in 2006.

On July 9, 2008, U.S. Representative Jim McDermott (D-Seattle) used one of Tornoe's cartoons as a backdrop for his criticism of officials of the George W. Bush administration and what he described as their true motivations for the Iraq War:

War Secretary Donald Rumsfeld may have said that invading Iraq had nothing to do with oil. But the announcement that western oil companies would get what they have lusted for says otherwise. And editorial cartoonist Rob Tornoe of Politicker.com summed up the world view the other day in the cartoon displayed behind me. He spoke truth to power with one compelling image. It says all at once that this entire war -- its tragic casualties and immense cost –- was all about oil.

== Controversy ==
On April 9, 2008, Tornoe posted a cartoon on Politicker's New Jersey website depicting a yarmulked, maniacally smiling Rep. Steve Rothman (D-9) about to wield a meat cleaver on Bergen County Democratic Chairman Joe Ferriero's private parts. Meanwhile, U.S. Senator Frank Lautenberg, also wearing a yarmulke, is shown holding Ferriero down for the procedure.

The cartoon poked fun at Rothman's move to keep Ferriero from endorsing Rep. Rob Andrews in his bid for Lautenberg's Senate seat, but both the New Jersey Jewish Standard and the New Jersey Jewish News reported criticisms of the cartoon as antisemitic.
