= Mark Sokolich =

American attorney and politician

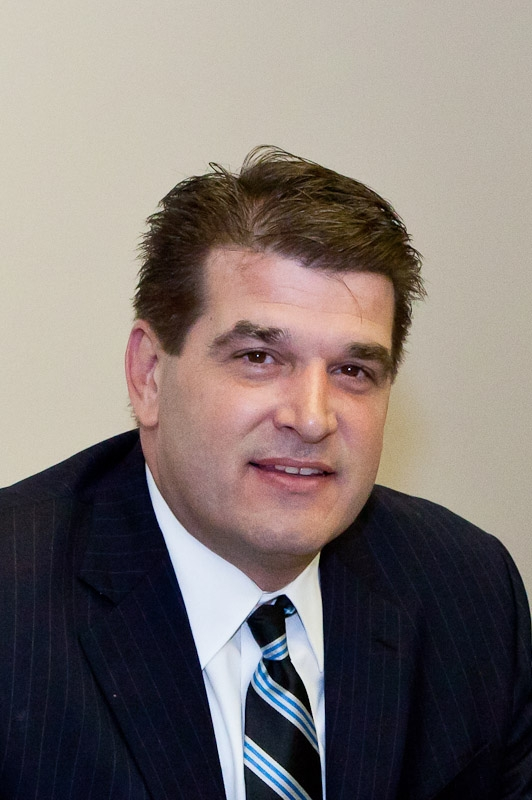

Mayor of Fort Lee
- Incumbent
- Assumed office January 7, 2008
- Preceded by: Jack Alter

Personal details
- Born: Mark J. Sokolich; 1963 (age 62–63) Fort Lee, New Jersey, U.S.
- Party: Democratic
- Education: Rutgers University; Seton Hall University
- Profession: Attorney and politician

Mark J. Sokolich (/ˈsɒkəlɪtʃ/ SOK-ə-litch; born 1963) is an American attorney and Democratic Party politician who has served as the mayor of Fort Lee, New Jersey. He is also the managing partner of the law firm that he founded.

== Early life ==
Sokolich is of Croatian (possibly from the Istrian region), descent and was raised in Fort Lee. His father died when he was 12 years old, and his mother died the following year.

Sokolich graduated from Fort Lee High School, where he played basketball and baseball, and was named All-State in basketball and All-County in baseball. Though universities offered him scholarships to play basketball, he broke his ankle during his senior year of high school, and the scholarship offers were withdrawn. Sokolich enrolled at Rutgers University, and he walked on to the Rutgers Scarlet Knights men's basketball team. He earned his bachelor's degree from Rutgers. Sokolich earned a juris doctor from Seton Hall University School of Law, which he attended at the same time as Chris Christie.

== Career ==
Sokolich worked in a few law firms, before forming his own, Sokolich & Macri, in 1998, of which he serves as the managing partner. He is also a director of ConnectOne Bank.

Sokolich served on the Fort Lee City Council for four years before being elected mayor in 2007. Sokolich replaced incumbent mayor Jack Alter as the Democratic candidate after Alter's sudden death. Sokolich was re-elected in 2011.

Sokolich has served as the mayor of Fort Lee since 2008, making him one of the longest-serving mayors in the town’s history.

When Chris Christie ran for re-election in 2013, Sokolich did not endorse him, despite many other Democrats across the state doing so. It was alleged that this lack of an endorsement led Christie's deputy chief of staff to direct a Christie appointee on the board of the Port Authority of New York and New Jersey to reallocate two of the customary three toll lanes from Fort Lee to the George Washington Bridge, causing massive gridlock. The scandal, which was revealed after Christie won the election, helped cause a significant drop in Christie's popularity.

Political offices
Preceded by Jack Alter	Mayor of Fort Lee; January 7, 2008 – present	Succeeded by Incumbent
