= List of people involved in the Fort Lee lane closure scandal =

The Fort Lee lane closure scandal, also known as the George Washington Bridge lane closure scandal or Bridgegate, is a U.S. political scandal in which a staff member and political appointees of New Jersey Governor Chris Christie colluded to create traffic jams in Fort Lee, New Jersey, by closing lanes at the main toll plaza for the upper level of the George Washington Bridge. The closures were intended to embarrass or anger Fort Lee Mayor Mark Sokolich who had not supported Christie politically.

Three people were eventually charged by Paul J. Fishman, the United States Attorney for the District of New Jersey. A Port Authority of New York and New Jersey (PANYNJ) official, David Wildstein, pleaded guilty in the case and is cooperating with prosecutors. Bill Baroni, the former deputy executive director of the PANYNJ, and Bridget Anne Kelly, former deputy chief of staff to Governor Christie, were charged with conspiracy and fraud and entered pleas of not guilty.

Fishman also compiled a list of unindicted co-conspirators, parties who were aware of the closures at the time they took place or involved in a possible cover-up but who were not charged, which was not made public. The release of the names of so-called co-conspirators has been a matter of controversy in and of itself. and was taken up by Judge Susan Davis Wigenton of the United States District Court for the District of New Jersey and United States Court of Appeals for the Third Circuit. While the names have been made available to attorneys, they have not been made public pending proceedings. Another list, of others "who may have had knowledge of the conspiracy or took actions that happened to further its goals" but did not join the conspiracy, came to light in judicial proceedings in March 2016. Despite the release of some documents after the trial the names of unindicted co-conspirators were not released.

In testimony given in September 2016, Wildstein said that among those who knew of the lane closures either before or while they were taking place or were made aware of attempts at a cover-up were Governor Christie, political advisors Bill Stepien and Michael DuHaime, and PANYNJ staff David Samson, Pat Schuber, and Philip Kwon.

== Key people ==
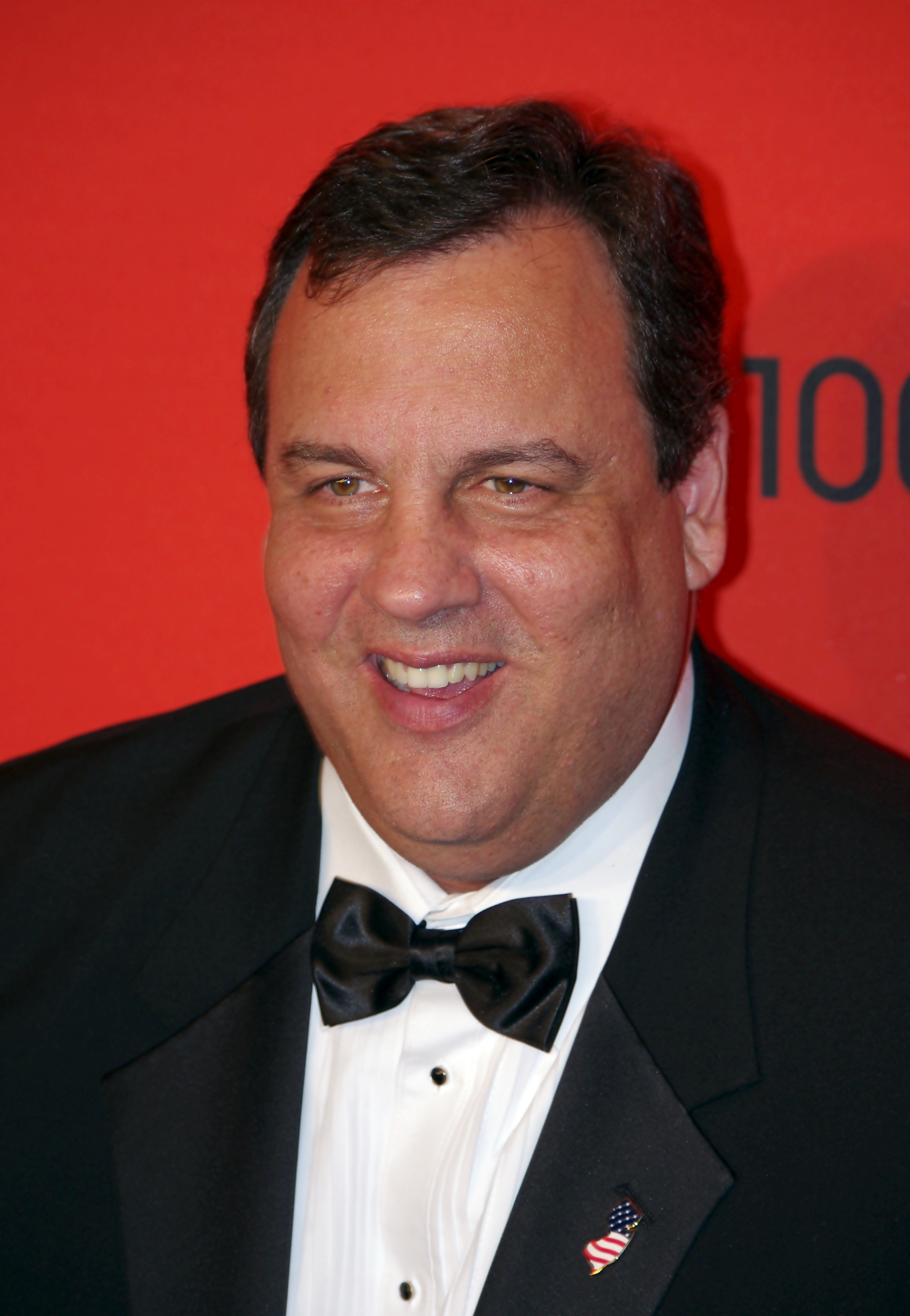
New Jersey Governor Chris Christie

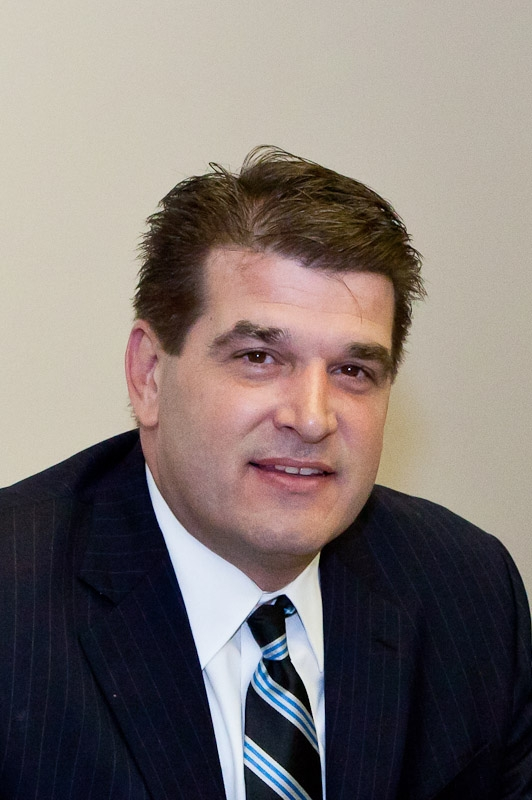
Fort Lee Mayor Mark Sokolich

Person	Role	Notes
Port Authority (PA)
Bill Baroni	Deputy Executive Director (Appointed by Christie)	Resigned on December 13, 2013; was David Wildstein's supervisor, has been accused of collaborating in the planning and cover-up of the toll lane closures.
Patrick "Pat" Foye	Executive director (Appointed by Governor of New York Andrew Cuomo)	Wrote email critical of closures and ordered re-opening of the local toll lanes on September 13, 2013.
David Samson	Chairman of the PA Board of Commissioners (Appointed by Christie); Partner in Wolff & Samson law firm	Was involved in the aftermath, as shown in a series of subpoenaed written communications; Samson's law practice generated complaints of conflict of interest with his PA role; resigned on March 28, 2014.
David Wildstein	Director of Interstate Capital Projects (Recommended by Christie; hired by and worked under Baroni)	Ordered PA staff to close the lanes and make no disclosures to Fort Lee officials or the public. Resigned on December 13, 2013. His position was eliminated on February 4, 2014.
Office of the Governor
Chris Christie	Governor of New Jersey	Claimed no knowledge of his aides' involvement until he read about it in the media on January 8, 2014; a law firm hired by Christie cleared him of involvement, but it has been widely criticized.
Michael Drewniak	Press Secretary to Christie	Responded to media inquiries at the governor's office and at the PA. Testified before a federal grand jury on April 4, 2014.
Regina Egea	Director of the Authorities Unit	Received the Foye email on September 13, 2013; was scheduled to replace O'Dowd if his nomination to State Attorney General was confirmed by the NJ Senate.
Bridget Anne Kelly	Deputy Chief of Staff for Legislative and Intergovernmental Affairs	Authored August 13, 2013, email to Wildstein: "Time for some traffic problems in Fort Lee"; fired by Christie on January 9, 2014.
Charlie McKenna	Chief Counsel to Christie	Ran December 2013 investigation into governor's office's involvement (with O'Dowd); became director of NJSDA that month and was replaced by Christopher Porrino; purportedly the "Charlie" in subpoenaed texts and emails.
Kevin O'Dowd	Chief of Staff to Christie	Ran governor's office investigation (with McKenna); nominated in December 2013 for State Attorney General; January confirmation hearing was postponed due to potential conflict since he ran Christie's investigation.
Bill Stepien	Christie's political consultant and election campaign manager (including governor elections in 2009 and 2013); Former Deputy Chief of Staff for intergovernmental affairs (prior to Fort Lee scandal events)	Removed by Christie on January 8, 2014, as political adviser, and nominee for Republican Party State Chairman for NJ, due to the tone of his comments in subpoenaed emails. Stepien then worked for FLS Connect (a Republican voter contact consulting firm in Minnesota with previous ties to Christie), and for GOPAC (a Republican 527 organization).
State and federal investigators
Paul J. Fishman	United States Attorney for the District of New Jersey	Opened an inquiry in January 2014; in 2009, sworn into his position, which had been held by Christie in 2008.
Reid Schar	Special counsel to a joint special investigative committee for the New Jersey Legislature	To assist the committee in the legal aspects of their investigation; Jenner & Block, Schar's law firm, represented Assembly Democrats in New Jersey's legislative redistricting battles of 2011 and 2001.
Loretta Weinberg	Co-chair of a joint special investigative committee for the New Jersey Legislature	State Senate majority leader (Democrat); On January 27, 2014, the New Jersey Senate and Assembly voted to create a joint committee in order to take over the investigation from the Assembly Transportation Committee.
John Wisniewski	Co-chair of a joint special investigative committee for the New Jersey Legislature and chair of Assembly Transportation Committee	Deputy speaker and Democratic member of the Assembly; started committee hearings in November 2013 and subpoenaed documents that identified key figures and their actions in the toll lane closures and alleged cover-up.

== Legal representation for key people and organizations ==
Client	Legal representatives	Notes and key credentials
Port Authority (PA)
Bill Baroni	Michael B. Himmel, a partner at the New York and Roseland, New Jersey offices of Lowenstein Sandler	Himmel was the attorney for Solomon Dwek, who was as an informant in Operation Bid Rig III that brought down several New Jersey politicians
David Samson	Michael Chertoff, "senior of counsel" at the Washington, D.C. law firm Covington & Burling; Angelo J. Genova, senior partner, chairman, and co-founder of the Newark law firm Genova Burns LLC	Chertoff is a former United States Attorney and Secretary of Homeland Security; his consulting firm received a Port Authority no-bid contract to review its security; Genova had served on the PA Board of Commissioners
David Wildstein	Alan L. Zegas, a criminal defense attorney, at Chatham, New Jersey–based Law Offices of Alan L. Zegas	
Philip Kwon	Geoffrey S. Berman, co-managing shareholder of the New Jersey office of Greenberg Traurig, LLP	Berman worked as an assistant United States attorney for the Southern District of New York in the early 1990s and was the associate counsel to the independent prosecutor investigating Iran-Contra for the government during the late 1980s.
Office of the Governor
Christie's Office of the Governor (and five staff members)	Gibson, Dunn & Crutcher, including partner Randy M. Mastro, based in the firm's New York office	Hired in January 2014, after disclosure of subpoenaed documents from the New Jersey Transportation Committee, in order to aid in an investigation for the governor's office and respond to "appropriate" official inquiries
Bridget Anne Kelly	Michael Critchley Sr., founder of the Roseland, New Jersey–based firm Critchley, Kinum & Vazquez	Replaced Walter F. Timpone, who cited a conflict of interest as Christie's appointed vice-chairman of the Election Law Enforcement Commission
Bill Stepien	Kevin Marino, a principal and founder of Chatham, New Jersey–based Marino, Tortorella & Boyle	
Other persons or organizations
Christie's 2013 re-election campaign	Patton Boggs, including partner Mark D. Sheridan, in Newark until that office closes and moves to Florham Park, New Jersey	Official name for re-election campaign was Chris Christie for Governor Inc.
New Jersey Republican State Committee	Patton Boggs, including partner Mark D. Sheridan	The firm serves as general counsel for the Republican State Committee
Mark Sokolich	Timothy M. Donohue, a criminal defense attorney and partner at Arleo, Donohue & Biancamano, LLC, in West Orange, New Jersey	Donohue, to be paid by Fort Lee, has represented public officials in state and federal jury trials. Mayor Sokolich acquiesced to the request by the borough attorney and council for this "prudent" arrangement as a contingency.

== New Jersey Legislative Select Committee on Investigation ==
On January 21, 2014, Assemblyman John S. Wisniewski and State Senate majority leader Loretta Weinberg, whose district includes Fort Lee, announced that the Senate and Assembly committee investigating the matter would merge into the bi-partisan joint New Jersey Legislative Select Committee on Investigation, which they would co-chair and would have 12 members. While the committee initially focused on the Bridgegate scandal, it had the power to investigate other allegations against the Christie administration. On January 24, 2014, the members of the bi-partisan committee were announced; eight Assembly representatives, including five Democrats and three Republicans, and four Senators, including three Democrats and one Republican. At the time, 40% of the members of the New Jersey Legislature were Republican. Besides the two Democratic co-chairs, members included Assemblywoman Marlene Caride (D-Bergen), Assemblyman Michael Patrick Carroll (R-Morris), Senator Nia Gill (D-Essex), Senator Linda Greenstein (D-Middlesex), Assembly Majority Leader Louis Greenwald (D-Camden), Assemblywoman Amy Handlin (R-Monmouth), Assemblywoman Valerie Huttle (D-Bergen), Assemblywoman Holly Schepisi (R-Bergen), Assemblywoman Bonnie Watson Coleman (D-Mercer), and an unnamed Republican Senator. On January 27, both houses voted unanimously to combine the investigations, maintaining the partisan balance, and announced Kevin O'Toole's (R-Essex) inclusion despite his mention in a December 5 email from Wildstein to Michael Drewniak. Assemblyman Paul D. Moriarty (D-4th Legislative) District subsequently replaced Watson.

== United States Attorney for the District of New Jersey ==
In some cases the United States Attorney for the District of New Jersey asked the Legislative Select Committee on Investigation to delay in calling witnesses in connection with its own investigations in the lane closures and other matters.

== Governor's Office staff subpoenaed by the Joint Legislative Committee ==
Governor's Office staff subpoenaed by the Joint Legislative Committee
Office of the Governor	Custodian of Records	Also subpoenaed by US Attorney
Jeanne Ashmore	Director of Constituent Relations	
Maria Comella	Communications Director	
Nicole Crifo	Senior Counsel to the Authorities Unit	Requested by US Attorney Office to postpone taking testimony
Michael Drewniak	Spokesman, Governor's Office	Testified May 13, 2014; Testified April 4, 2014 in US Attorney Office investigation
Regina Egea	incoming Chief of Staff	Testified July 17, 2014.
Rosemary Iannacone	Director of operations	
Bridget Anne Kelly	former Deputy Chief of Staff	5th amendment
Paul Matey	Deputy Chief Counsel	
Charles McKenna	former Chief Counsel to the Governor	Requested by US Attorney's Office to postpone taking testimony
Kevin O'Dowd	Chief of Staff	Testified June 9, 2014
Barbara Panebianco	Executive Assistant to Bridget Anne Kelly	
Christopher Porrino	Chief Counsel	
Colin Reed	Spokesman	
Christina Genovese Renna	Director of Departmental Relations, Governor's Office	Testified May 6, 2014
Evan J. Ridley	Aide, Office of Intergovernmental Affairs	

== Christie for Governor and campaign associates subpoenaed by the Joint Legislative Committee ==
Governor's Office staff subpoenaed by the Joint Legislative Committee
Christie for Governor, Inc	re-election campaign	
Michael DuHaime	political adviser to Christie	
Nicole Davidman	GOP fundraiser	
Matt Mowers	Campaign staff Former Aide, Office of Intergovernmental Affairs	Testified May 20, 2014
Bill Stepien	former Campaign Manager for Christie; Deputy Chief of Staff, Office of the Governor	5th amendment

== PANYNJ officials invited to testify/subpoenaed by the NJ Legislature committees ==
PANYNJ officials interviewed/subpoenaed by the NJ Legislature committees
Bill Baroni	Deputy Executive Director	Interviewed (not under oath) November 25, 2013 Assembly Transportation Committee; Video and testimony documents subpoenaed by US Attorney January 2015.
Matthew Bell	Special assistant to Baroni	
Steve Coleman	Deputy Director of Media Relations	
Phillipe Danielides	Senior Adviser to Chairman	Requested by US Attorney Office to postpone taking testimony
Gretchen DiMarco	Assistant to Baroni	
Robert Durando	General manager GWB	Testimony (not under oath) December 9, 2013 Assembly Committee on Transportation
Pat Foye	Director	Testimony (not under oath) December 9, 2014 (not under oath) Assembly Transportation Committee; Testimony Select Committee on Investigations postponed at request of US Attorney
Cedrick Fulton	Director of Bridges, Tunnels and Terminals	Testimony (not under oath) December 9, 2013 Assembly Committee on Transportation
Philip Kwon	Deputy General Counsel	Requested by US Attorney Office to postpone taking testimony Subpoenaed by US Attorney
Cristina Lado	Director for Government and Community Affairs	
John Ma	Chief of Staff to Foye	
Mark Muriello	Assistant director of Tunnels, Bridges and Terminals	
Paul Nunziato	PA police officer and PBA president	Requested by US Attorney Office to postpone taking testimony
David Samson	Chairman	Initially complied with release of some documents later cited Fifth Amendment
William “Pat” Schuber	Commissioner	Testified June 3, 2014, Select Committee on Investigations
Arielle Schwarz	Special assistant to David Wildstein	
David Wildstein	Director of Interstate Capital Projects	Documents submitted December 19, 2013; Testimony January 9, 2015 Assembly Transportation Committee citing Fifth Amendment

== See also ==
- Governorship of Chris Christie
- Deborah Gramiccioni
- Bill Brennan (activist)
