= David Samson (lawyer) =

American politician (born 1939)

53rd Attorney General of New Jersey
- In office January 15, 2002 – February 15, 2003
- Governor: Jim McGreevey
- Preceded by: John Farmer
- Succeeded by: Peter Harvey

Personal details
- Born: August 14, 1939 (age 87) Newark, New Jersey, U.S.
- Education: Rutgers University, New Brunswick; University of Pennsylvania

David Samson (born August 14, 1939) is an American lawyer who served as New Jersey Attorney General under Democratic governor Jim McGreevey from 2002 to 2003. He served as the chairman of the Port Authority of New York and New Jersey (PANYNJ) from 2011 until his resignation on March 28, 2014 in the aftermath of the Fort Lee lane closure scandal. Samson is a partner and founding member of the law firm Wolff & Samson from which he resigned in April 2015, and had been an ally of Governor Chris Christie.

On July 14, 2016, Samson pleaded guilty to a felony for conspiring to impede an airport project to coerce United Airlines to reinstate a discontinued flight to an airport in South Carolina, near a home that he owned. Samson was ordered to pay a $100,000 fine and sentenced to a year of home confinement at the South Carolina vacation house that was subject of the crime.

== Early life and education ==
Samson was born to a Jewish family in Newark and was raised in Hillside, Union County, New Jersey.

He graduated with a Bachelor of Arts degree from Rutgers University in 1961 and earned a law degree from the University of Pennsylvania Law School in 1965.

== Career in New Jersey government and politics ==
Early in his career, he served a judicial clerkship with Associate Justice Nathan L. Jacobs of the New Jersey Supreme Court.

During 2002–2003, Samson served as New Jersey Attorney General under Democratic governor Jim McGreevey serving as the chief law enforcement officer for New Jersey. In this role, he supervised the statewide Divisions of Criminal Justice, New Jersey State Police, Civil Rights, Consumer Affairs and Gaming Enforcement, as well as the Division of Law, which represents all executive departments in New Jersey State government. As Chairman of the New Jersey Domestic Security Preparedness Task Force, he worked hand-in-hand with federal agencies in organizing and directing counter-terrorism efforts throughout the New Jersey-New York area.

Samson was formerly a close associate and confidant of Chris Christie. In 2009, Samson was counsel to the gubernatorial election campaign of Chris Christie and thereafter served as the chairman of Christie's transition committee. Samson has also acted as a court-appointed labor union trustee, a civil litigation discovery master and as a federal monitor pursuant to a United States Department of Justice deferred prosecution agreement.

Among his public positions, Samson was appointed by Governor James Florio as a member of the governor’s Commission on Health Care Costs and by Governor Thomas Kean as the chairman of the governor’s Task Force on the Laws Governing the University of Medicine and Dentistry of New Jersey. He also served from 1982-1990 as general counsel to the New Jersey Turnpike Authority.

Samson was appointed by the Supreme Court of New Jersey to serve on its ethics committee and was a member of the court's Committee on Reporting of Court Decisions. He was also the legal consultant to the Advisory Committee to the Attorney General on Governmental Immunity. In addition, Samson served on the New Jersey Bar Association Committee on Judicial and Prosecutorial Appointments.

Christie nominated Samson to the Board of Commissioners of the Port Authority of New York and New Jersey on September 30, 2010. He was confirmed by the New Jersey Senate on January 25, 2011, and was elected as the agency's Chairman on February 3, 2011.

Samson was presented with Essex County, New Jersey's Star of Essex award during the county’s annual Jewish Heritage Celebration on May 7, 2013.

After United States senator Frank Lautenberg died on June 3, 2013, there was speculation that Gov. Christie would appoint Samson to fill the vacant seat in the United States Senate. Instead, Christie picked Samson's former law partner, New Jersey Attorney General Jeffrey Chiesa.

== Controversies ==
=== Fort Lee lane closure scandal ===
In January 2014, it was revealed in subpoenaed e-mails that Samson had tried to retaliate against Port Authority of New York and New Jersey (PANYNJ) Executive Director Patrick J. Foye, who allegedly leaked his own September 13, 2013, e-mail criticizing the closure of two of three local toll lanes to the George Washington Bridge without following regular protocols and without notifying Foye, and supported David Wildstein, who resigned from the Port Authority in December 2013, for his role in closing those dedicated toll lanes for an entrance in Fort Lee, New Jersey. This fueled speculation that Samson was involved in the scandal. Official e-mails sent from Samson to other Port Authority officials sharply criticized Foye's order to re-open the two closed toll lanes for the George Washington Bridge, accusing the latter of "stirring up trouble." Samson hired Michael Chertoff from Covington & Burling and Genova Burns Giantomasi Webster as legal representation.

On February 19, 2014 Samson apologized on behalf of the commissioners "for inconvenience caused to our travelers" without directly stating that it was due to plans by some individuals to cause traffic jams with the toll lane closings at the bridge, and without acknowledging the detrimental effects on the borough of Fort Lee and its public services, mayor, and officials The editorial board of The Star-Ledger, a New Jersey newspaper with the largest circulation in the state, assessed Samson's apology as "too little, too late", noted a list of his failures and conflicts of interests, and called for him to resign. According to records released by subpoena, Samson is said to have been intimately involved with day-to-day operations at the Port Authority.

=== Allegations of conflict of interest and resignation ===
Several dealings between Wolff and Samson and the Port Authority have come under media scrutiny for possible conflict of interest

A report by The Star-Ledger found Samson voted at the Port Authority to award multimillion-dollar contracts to Railroad Construction Company Inc, a company whose owner is represented by Samson's law firm. In March 2014, The New York Times reported in a front-page article that a "comprehensive examination" had shown the extent to which clients of Samson's law firm had profited from dealings with the Port Authority during Samson's term as chairman. The Times reported that "Samson and his law firm benefited financially," and that Christie "benefited politically."

On February 25, 2013, Patrick Foye, the Executive Director of the Port Authority, said he does not believe Chairman Samson has moral authority to run the Port Authority.

The New Jersey Working Families Alliance claimed that Samson misused his authority as chairman of the Port Authority of New York and New Jersey, alleging that Samson traded his public position to benefit the private clients of his law firm, and filed an ethics complaint with the New Jersey State Ethics Commission.

The Bergen County freeholders (county legislature), which has no oversight over the PA, called for the resignation of both Chairman Samson (since his political activity allegedly conflicted with his actions regarding the aftermath of the lane closures and other PA issues) and the other five New Jersey appointed commissioners (based on their failure to exercise oversight in the aftermath of the Bridgegate controversy). Bergen County is the most populous New Jersey county and includes Fort Lee and surrounding communities that were impacted by the lane closures.

Calls for Samson's resignation and/or removal came from The Star-Ledger, The Record (twice), The New York Times, Daily News (New York), and the Bergen County Board of Chosen Freeholders.

In response to these matters, Christie said in late February 2014 that he "strongly, firmly" stands behind Samson as chairman of the Port Authority. However, on March 28, 2014, Christie announced Samson's resignation from the Port Authority, "effective immediately" at a press conference.

In December 2014 Samson and his law firm sued the New Jersey State Ethics Commission in U.S. District Court, claiming it does not have the authority to investigate Port Authority commissioners. The suit was dropped on December 24, 2014.

=== Federal investigations into the "chairman's flight" and guilty plea ===
The Public Corruption Unit of the U.S. Attorney's Office in the Southern District of New York, led by U.S. Attorney Preet Bharara, opened an investigation into Samson's conduct as Port Authority chairman.

On March 7, 2014, federal prosecutors subpoenaed the Port Authority for documents related to Samson's private business interests, but rescinded the request on March 10, 2014, due to an overlapping investigation into the toll lane closures by Paul J. Fishman, United States Attorney for the District of New Jersey.

In January 2015, federal prosecutors subpoenaed records related to Samson's personal travel, and his relationship with Newark Liberty International Airport's largest carrier, United Airlines, as part of a probe into a flight route initiated by United while Samson was chairman of the transportation agency that operates the region's airports. The route provided non-stop service between Newark and Columbia Metropolitan Airport in South Carolina, located about 50 mi (80 km) from a home where Samson often spent weekends. United halted the non-stop route on April 1, 2014, three days after Samson resigned from the position. Samson referred to the twice-a-week route — with a flight leaving Newark on Thursday evenings and another returning on Monday mornings — as “the chairman’s flight.” The PANYNJ cooperated with the investigation. Additional records were subpoenaed from the PANYNJ in August 2015. In September 2015, top officials at United resigned in conjunction with the investigation.

In April 2015, amid reports of a "sprawling investigation", Samson retired from Wolff & Samson. He had been at the firm for 44 years. At that time, a Wolff & Samson spokesperson announced the firm was changing its name to Chiesa Shahinian & Giantomasi P.C.

On July 14, 2016, Samson pleaded guilty in the U.S. District Court for the District of New Jersey to one felony count of conspiracy. The indictment charged that Samson impeded an airport hangar project to coerce the airline to reinstate the flight to Columbia. Samson was ordered to pay a $100,000 fine and sentenced to a year of home confinement at the South Carolina vacation house that was subject of the crime.

== Official misconduct charges ==
On April 4, 2017 Bill Brennan, Democratic activist and candidate for Democratic nominee governor, filed a citizen's complaint against Samson in Newark municipal court stating that Samson's confession to extortion and bribery amounted to a confession of official misconduct. Essex County Judge Marvin Adames dismissed the charges, ruling that Brennan did not have standing to bring the suit.

== See also ==
- Governorship of Chris Christie
- List of people involved in the Fort Lee lane closure scandal

Legal offices
Preceded by John Farmer	Attorney General of New Jersey; 2002–2003	Succeeded by Peter Harvey
Political offices
Preceded by Anthony Coscia	Chairperson of the Port Authority of New York and New Jersey; 2011–2014	Succeeded by John J. Degnan
