= Duhaime =

Duhaime is a surname. Notable people with the surname include:

- Brandon Duhaime (born 1997), American ice hockey player
- Chantal Duhaime (born 1990), Canadian curler
- Éric Duhaime (born 1969), Canadian politician
- Greg Duhaime (1953–1992), Canadian track and field athlete
- Michael DuHaime (born 1974), American public affairs executive
- Yves Duhaime (born 1939), Canadian politician
