= Drewniak =

Drewniak is a surname. Notable people with the surname include:

- Michael Drewniak, American press secretary to the Governor of New Jersey
- Szymon Drewniak (born 1993), Polish footballer
