= Deborah Gramiccioni =

American lawyer

Deborah Gramiccioni is a lawyer based in New Jersey who has worked in the administration of Governor Chris Christie and as the deputy executive director of the Port Authority of New York and New Jersey. She sits on the Ocean County Family Court.

== Background ==
Gramiccioni grew up in Livingston, New Jersey and attended Livingston High School and the University of Pennsylvania. She has been on the board of directors of the North Jersey Transportation Planning Authority. She married Christopher Gramiccioni (Prosecutor for Monmouth County 2014-) in 2005. They reside in Wall Township. Gramiccioni still holds several records as a goalkeeper for the UPenn women's soccer team.

== Attorney ==
Gramiccioni has worked as a special assistant to the New Jersey Attorney General. She worked in the office of United States Attorney for the District of New Jersey under Christie

== Christie administration ==
After he was elected governor, Christie brought Gramiccioni into his administration as director of the Authorities Unit. She was later appointed director of the New Jersey Division of Criminal Justice.

== PANYNJ ==
Gramiccioni was appointed by New Jersey Governor Chris Christie as deputy executive director of the Port Authority of New York and New Jersey in December 2013 after the resignation of Bill Baroni.

== Judgeship nomination ==
Christie nominated Gramiccioni to a Superior Court vacancy in Mercer County in May 2016, but no confirmation hearing was held. In October 2016 Christie nominated her to a vacancy in Ocean County.

== See also ==
- Fort Lee lane closure controversy
- List of people involved in the Fort Lee lane closure scandal
- Governorship of Chris Christie
