= Charlie McKenna =

American public official

Charlie McKenna is the former Executive Director of the New Jersey Schools Development Authority and former Chief Counsel to the Governor of New Jersey.

== Biography ==
In 1982, McKenna received a Bachelor of Arts from Fordham University. In 1986, McKenna received a J.D. from St. John's University School of Law

McKenna spent 18 years employed by the United States Attorney's Office, District of New Jersey. From 1999 to 2002, McKenna was the US Attorney's Office Liaison to the FBI Joint Terrorism Task Force. From 2002 to 2008, McKenna was Executive Assistant to then-US Attorney Chris Christie. In 2008, McKenna was appointed to the post of Chief of the Criminal Division. In January 2010, McKenna was Director of the New Jersey State Office of Homeland Security and Preparedness.

In December 2011, Charles McKenna was appointed to serve as Chief Counsel to Governor Chris Christie.

On December 19, 2013, Gov. Christie announced McKenna's appointment as Executive Director of the New Jersey Schools Development Authority.

McKenna is one of several New Jersey state employees within the governor's office who has been subpoenaed by the New Jersey Legislature panel investigating the Fort Lee lane closure scandal. The United States Attorney for the District of New Jersey, which is conducting a parallel investigation ask that the panel postpone taking testimony.

== See also ==
- Governorship of Chris Christie
- List of people involved in the Fort Lee lane closure scandal
