= Fort Lee lane closure scandal =

2013–2014 New Jersey political scandal

Coordinates: 40°51′14″N 73°58′01″W

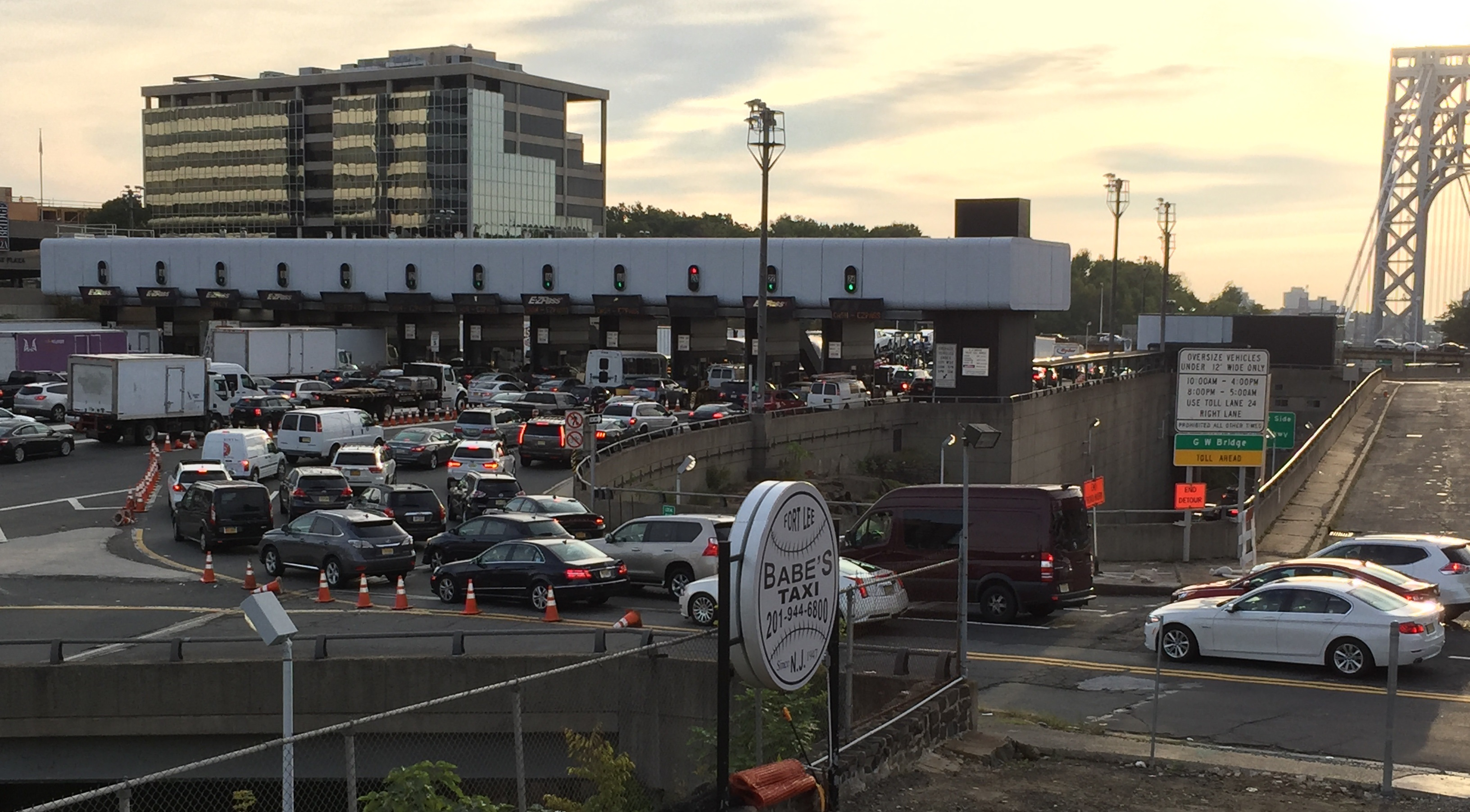
"Bridgegate" entrance, customary three rush-hour toll lanes (20, 22, 24)

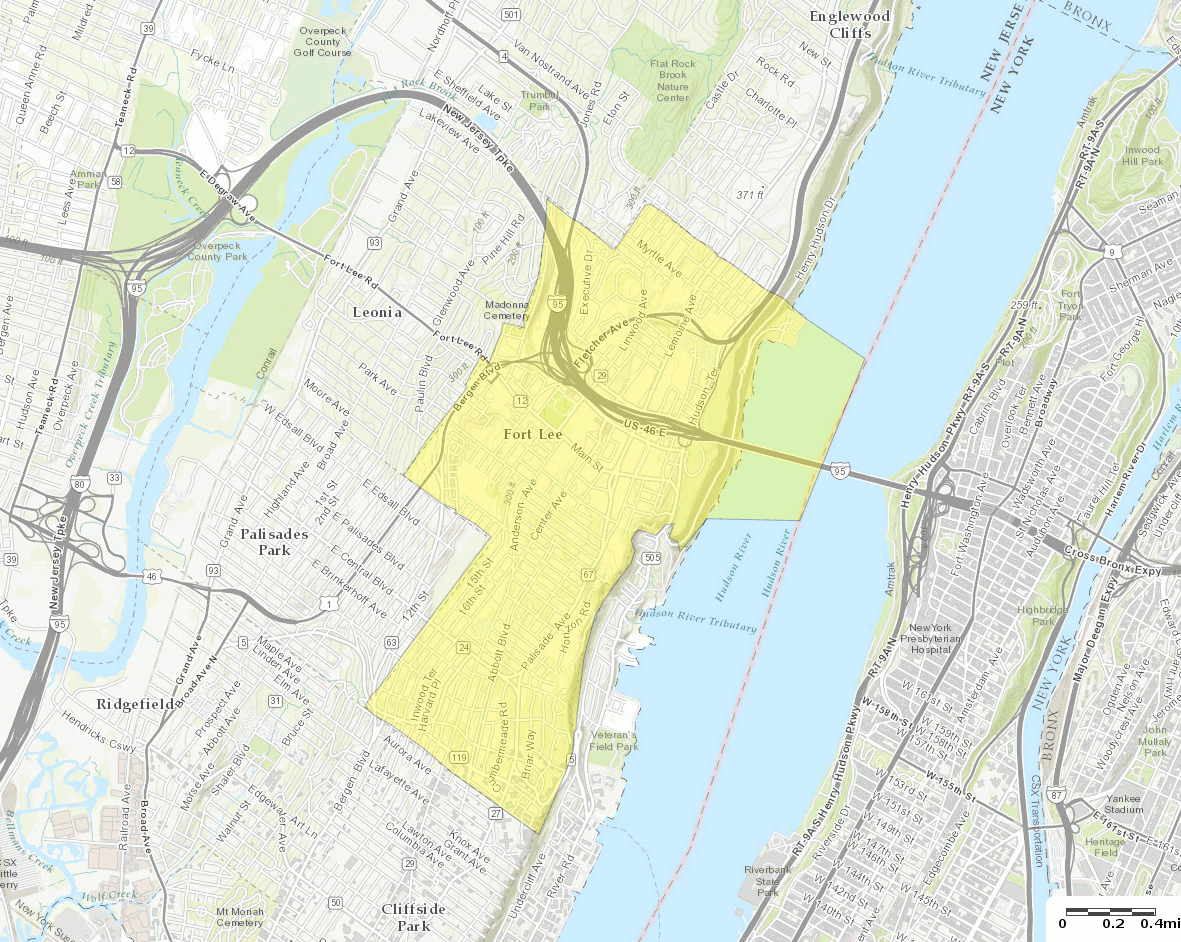
Fort Lee (highlighted in yellow) with George Washington Bridge marked as I-95 over the Hudson River to Manhattan, New York City

The Fort Lee lane closure scandal, better known as Bridgegate, was a political scandal in the U.S. state of New Jersey in 2013 and 2014. It involved a staff member and political appointees of then-governor Chris Christie colluding to create traffic jams in Fort Lee, New Jersey, by closing lanes at the main toll plaza for the upper level of the George Washington Bridge.

On September 9, 2013, two of three toll lanes for a local street entrance were closed during morning rush hour. Local officials, emergency services, and the public were not notified of the lane closures, which Fort Lee declared a threat to public safety. The resulting gridlock ended when the two lanes were reopened on September 13 by an order from Port Authority Executive Director and Democrat from New York, Patrick Foye. He said that the "hasty and ill-informed decision" could have endangered lives and violated federal and state laws.

It has been suggested that the lanes had been closed to cause the massive traffic problem for political reasons, and especially theorized that they were a retributive attack against Mayor of Fort Lee Mark Sokolich, a Democrat who had not supported Christie as a candidate in the 2013 New Jersey gubernatorial election. The ensuing investigations centered on several of Christie's appointees and staff, including David Wildstein, who ordered the lanes closed, and Bill Baroni, who had told the New Jersey Assembly Transportation Committee that the closures were for a traffic study.

An investigation led by U.S. Attorney Paul J. Fishman resulted in a nine-count indictment against the deputy chief of staff, Bridget Anne Kelly, along with Baroni and Wildstein. Wildstein entered a guilty plea and testified against Baroni and Kelly, who were found guilty on all counts in November 2016. David Samson pleaded guilty to one felony count of conspiracy in July 2016, for acts unrelated to the lane closures but unearthed by the federal Bridgegate investigation.

At the time of the scandal, Christie was a leading contender for the 2016 Republican nomination for President. The scandal was widely cited as a major factor in the early demise of Christie's 2016 presidential ambitions, and he dropped out of the race after a poor showing in the New Hampshire primary. Christie described the scandal as "a factor" in why he was bypassed by Donald Trump as the vice presidential nominee. Both the prosecution and the defense in the trial of two of Christie's former aides argued that Christie knew of his close associates' involvement in a plan to shut down lanes leading to the George Washington Bridge as it was happening, and that the closings were to punish Sokolich for declining to support Christie's reelection bid. This was the first time Christie had been officially accused of contemporaneous knowledge of the plot.

The defendants in the case appealed their convictions, and in 2019, the United States Supreme Court granted certiorari and heard the case (known as Kelly v. United States) in 2020. One defendant, Bill Baroni, having already begun serving his federal prison term, asked for immediate release. In May 2020 the Supreme Court unanimously overturned the convictions, judging that the defendants could not have violated the fraud statutes they were charged under since they had not obtained "money or property".

== Background ==
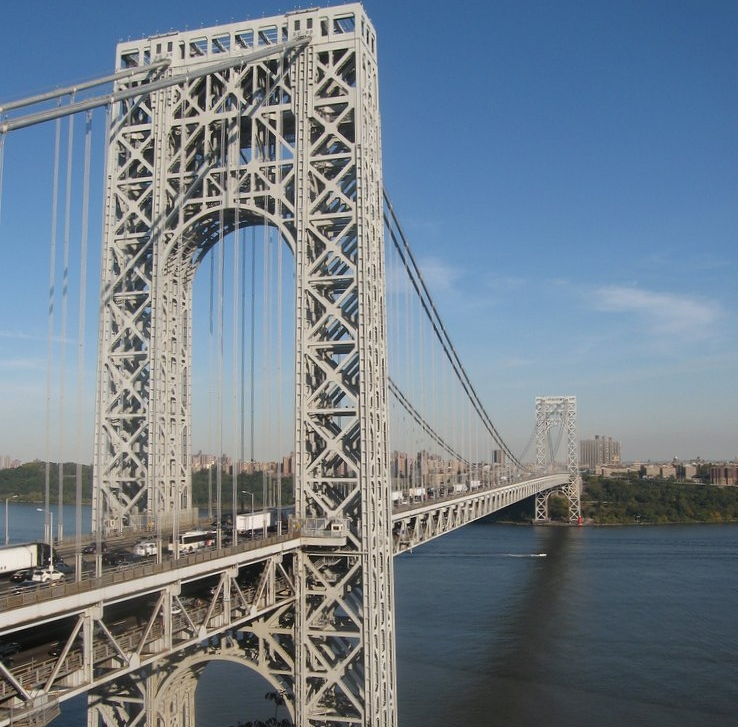
George Washington Bridge over the Hudson River; looking east from Fort Lee to Manhattan

The George Washington Bridge, a double-decker toll bridge, is the busiest motor-vehicle bridge in the world, with a toll charge for traffic from New Jersey to New York. At the time, there were 29 operating toll lanes spread among three toll plazas. At the main toll plaza for the upper level, there were twelve toll lanes and a Fort Lee entrance at Martha Washington Way (also called Park Avenue). During rush hours, for at least the previous 30 years, the three lanes located furthest to the right (the south end of the toll plaza) were ordinarily reserved for local traffic entering from Fort Lee and the surrounding communities. This local traffic was segregated by movable traffic cones from the heavier traffic of the major highways. There were other Fort Lee street entrances, which did not have dedicated toll lanes, to the lower and upper levels of the bridge.

The Port Authority of New York and New Jersey (PANYNJ or simply the PA), the owner of the bridge, was overseen by a Board of Commissioners. Under an informal power-sharing agreement, the governor of New Jersey chose the chairman of the board and the deputy executive director, while the governor of New York chose the vice-chairman and executive director.

Chris Christie, a Republican, was first elected Governor of New Jersey in November 2009 and re-elected in November 2013. During his first term, he appointed Bill Baroni as deputy executive director of the PA. David Wildstein, a local politician and political blogger who had known Christie during high school, was hired by Baroni based on Christie's referral and recommendation in May 2010. As director of interstate capital projects, Wildstein was New Jersey's second highest executive at the Port Authority, and often substituted for Baroni at major meetings.

== Events ==
During the week of August 4, 2013, Christie met with David Samson, Christie's appointed chairman of the Board of Commissioners of the Port Authority. John Wisniewski, then the deputy speaker of the New Jersey Assembly and chair of the Assembly Transportation Committee, alleged that David Wildstein, the Christie appointee who ordered the closures, must have believed the meeting was related to the lane closures based on an investigation into the closures undertaken by the committee, which Wisniewski led. A reference to the meeting had been included in the subpoenaed documents Wildstein submitted in which all information not pertaining to the Fort Lee lane closures had been redacted.

On August 13, Bridget Anne Kelly, deputy chief of staff in Christie's office, sent an eight-word e-mail to David Wildstein that read, "Time for some traffic problems in Fort Lee." Wildstein responded to Kelly's e-mail: "Got it."

On September 6, Wildstein instructed George Washington Bridge manager Robert Durando not to tell anyone in Fort Lee about the upcoming closure, not even the police. When Durando questioned the order, which he thought was "odd" since he had never been instructed in his 35-year career not to tell host town officials about an event that would disrupt traffic, Wildstein told him "it would impact the study" if people knew and Wildstein "wanted to see what would naturally happen".

Wildstein sent an e-mail the same day to Kelly informing her that Christie had approved $60,000 to fund a traffic study for Springfield in Union County. The Democratic mayor, David Amlen, did not endorse Christie for re-election and was not informed of the approval of their requested traffic study until after Christie won re-election.

=== Closure ===
On Monday, September 9, 2013, prior to the morning rush hour on the first day of the school year, two of the three dedicated toll lanes at one of the Fort Lee entrances to the upper level of the GW Bridge were closed to local use, and were reallocated to the main highway traffic, on orders from Wildstein without notification to Fort Lee government and police officials. In an area that normally experiences a great deal of traffic, the lane closings caused a significant increase in traffic congestion. This led to major delays for school transportation and police and emergency responses within Fort Lee, both during and after the peak hours of travel.

According to the Fort Lee emergency medical services coordinator, traffic jams delayed paramedic response times, including a 9-1-1 call for Florence Genova, who subsequently died of cardiac arrest. In January 2014, her daughter told The New York Times that she "wants to stay out of it. It's not political". She noted her mother's advanced age (91) and opined that "it was just her time".

In at least one instance, emergency medical workers were forced to leave their ambulance and respond on foot because traffic congestion was so heavy. Emergency responders were delayed nearly one hour in rendering assistance to a man experiencing chest pains.

Within hours of the closure, various Port Authority officials were being told that the traffic delays posed a threat to public safety. At 9:29 a.m., Matthew Bell, a special assistant to Bill Baroni, e-mailed Baroni regarding "urgent matter of public safety in Fort Lee". Fort Lee Borough Administrator Peggy Thomas e-mailed the PA's director of government and community relations, Tina Lado, with her concerns, noting that police and emergency departments received no advance notice of the closures. At 11:24 a.m., Lado e-mailed both Wildstein and Baroni informing them that due to the closures, police and ambulances were having difficulty responding to emergencies. That e-mail noted two specific incidents: a missing child (later found) and a cardiac arrest. These safety warnings were reportedly ignored.

At the federal trial of Baroni and Kelly, Fort Lee Police Chief Keith Bendul testified that he had reached Durando on that Monday, who asked for a meeting not at the PA office, but in a nearby municipal parking lot. "I thought it was cloak and dagger." Durando spoke of the traffic study, and Bendul demanded its ending, citing the various safety problems. "I told [Durando] bluntly that if anybody dies, I'm going to tell those people to sue him and everybody at the Port Authority." A nervous Durando told Bendul that Sokolich should contact Baroni, and added that "if anybody asked if this meeting occurred, he [Durando] would deny it", Bendul testified.

Deputy Chief of Staff Bridget Kelly e-mailed Wildstein and asked about his response, if any, to Fort Lee mayor Mark Sokolich. Wildstein responded: "Radio silence. His name comes right after Mayor [Steven] Fulop [of Jersey City]."

PAPD Lieutenant Thomas "Chip" Michaels, a childhood friend of Christie's, ordered his subordinates not to touch the cones, and chauffeured Wildstein around the Fort Lee area on an observation tour, and updated Wildstein on traffic conditions throughout the week, via text messages.

On Tuesday, September 10, Sokolich texted Baroni: "Presently we have four very busy traffic lanes merging into only one toll booth ... bigger problem is getting kids to school. Help please. It's maddening." Kelly's text message exchange with Wildstein referred to the mayor's message. Kelly asked, "Is it wrong that I am smiling?" Wildstein replied, "No." Kelly then wrote, "I feel badly about the kids. I guess." Wildstein responded, "They are the children of Buono voters", referring to Barbara Buono, Christie's Democratic opponent in the November election.

PAPD Officer Steve Pisciotta was stationed near the affected entrance, and reported over his radio about hazardous conditions created by the severe traffic. PAPD Deputy Inspector Darcy Licorish radioed back, "Shut up", and that there should be no over-the-air discussion of the closure. Lt. Michaels and PAPD Sgt. Nadine Rhem later visited Pisciotta in person, warning that his communication was inappropriate.

On Wednesday, September 11, Robert Durando said in a Port Authority e-mail that if the automated toll lanes were closed permanently in favor of one staffed toll lane for local traffic, it would be "very expensive" since annual toll-collector costs would increase approximately $600,000. This would have covered overtime, as well as stationing reserve employees when a scheduled toll collector was not able to work. He said there would be additional, but still to be determined costs, for PA police due to their coverage of traffic for a greatly extended rush hour.

Christie, Wildstein, Samson and Baroni were photographed together at the site of the World Trade Center during a commemoration of the 12th anniversary of the terrorist attacks. On that occasion, Wildstein later testified, Baroni sarcastically told Christie, "Governor, there is a tremendous amount of traffic in Fort Lee, please know Mayor Sokolich is frustrated he can't get his calls returned", to which Christie was said to have responded, "I imagine they wouldn't be getting their calls returned." According to Wildstein, Baroni then told Christie that Wildstein would monitor the traffic, and Christie responded, "Well, I'm sure Mr. Edge wouldn't be involved in anything political", and laughed. ("Wally Edge" was the pseudonymous persona used by Wildstein in his earlier highly political blog.)

On Thursday, September 12, PA engineers said that reported delays for local traffic greatly exceeded any time savings for the major highway traffic based on reported information for vehicle travel times on Interstate 95 and local traffic counts from that week. In an internal PowerPoint presentation, it was estimated that the extra daily morning rush hour time, 2,800 vehicle-hours, endured by local traffic on a typical day greatly outweighed time savings, 966 vehicle-hours, for the I-95 traffic.

Sokolich wrote to Baroni that "many members of the public have informed me that the PA police officers are advising commuters ... that this recent traffic debacle is the result of a decision that I, as the Mayor, recently made."

According to his later testimony, John Ma (the chief of staff to the Port Authority's executive director, Patrick Foye), with Foye's knowledge beforehand, tipped off John Cichowski, the "Road Warrior" columnist for The Record. "I told him, off the record, that to my knowledge there was no traffic study and that the lane closures had been ordered by David Wildstein." Cichowski contacted the PA to ask about the delays, and this contact appeared on that evening's internal PA report of media contacts, getting the attention of Foye.

=== Reopening and immediate aftermath ===
On Friday morning, September 13, 2013, Patrick Foye, the executive director of the Port Authority and an appointee of New York governor Andrew Cuomo, ordered that the lanes be reopened in a strongly worded 7:44 a.m. e-mail to senior PA officials and staff, including Bill Baroni and David Samson. In the e-mail, Foye called the decision to close the lanes "hasty and ill-advised", said that the decision violated policy and long-standing custom at the PA, and that he believed that closing the lanes "violates Federal Law and the laws of both States". Foye asked his spokesman to get the word out. Upon learning this, Baroni attempted to prevent any disclosure in order to keep the public in the dark. Additionally, Baroni forwarded the e-mail to Regina Egea, Christie's Director of the authorities unit overseeing the PA, three hours after it was sent by Foye.

Foye would later testify that Baroni met with him two times on that Friday, pressing for reinstatement of the closure, saying it was "important to Trenton", or else "Trenton" would call, which Foye understood to mean Christie's office. "I said they should call", Foye testified. "I opened [the lanes], I was not closing them." However, Foye did approve a press release that he knew falsely cited a "traffic study".

During and after the lane closures, "hundreds of pages of e-mails and internal documents" showed "how Christie loyalists inside the PA worked to orchestrate a cover-up after traffic mayhem" in Fort Lee. In September, as more reporters began asking about the GW Bridge problems, officials conferred on how to respond. On September 13, The Record reported the outrage commuters were expressing toward the PA following days of long, inbound delays, and Fort Lee officials' unsuccessful efforts to get an explanation. Then on September 16, a Wall Street Journal reporter asked PA spokesman Coleman about what had occurred after some Journal editors had been in traffic the previous week. "Coleman passed the query up the chain of command" and Wildstein forwarded it to Baroni, commenting "I call bullshit on this." Further inquiries were directed by Coleman to Baroni and Wildstein, asking how they wanted the PA to respond, and Wildstein forwarded one of these inquiries to Christie's press secretary and chief spokesman, Michael Drewniak. Coleman also wrote to Baroni and Wildstein, "I will not respond unless instructed to do so."

On September 17, Wildstein informed Baroni that he had received a call from Wall Street Journal reporter Tedd Mann. "Jesus", Baroni replied, "Call Drewniak".

The e-mails showed efforts by Christie appointees in the PA and his office in Trenton to respond to the aftermath and media inquiries for the toll lane closures. The participants included Baroni, Wildstein, and PA Chairman Samson, as well as Drewniak and Maria Comella, Communications Director. In a September 18 e-mail, Samson warned that Foye is "playing in traffic, made a big mistake" in response to a leak to The Wall Street Journal for their September 17 story citing unnamed PA officials as saying the decision to close the toll lanes had caused tensions within the bi-state agency.

In other communications, officials used an ethnic pejorative to refer to the Fort Lee mayor. In an e-mail from Wildstein responding to Bill Stepien, he said "It will be a tough November for this little Serbian", derogatorily referring to Sokolich, who is Croatian-American. Baroni referred to "Serbia" in text messages in another apparent reference to Mayor Sokolich. Sokolich told The Huffington Post: "That slight is offensive to me, and it's offensive to me of everyone of Serbian background. If I were Serbian, I would be absolutely, positively appalled by it."

On October 9, Philippe Danielides, a senior adviser to Samson, e-mailed Wildstein a daily news summary and asked "Has any thought been given to writing an op-ed or providing a statement about the GWB study? Or is the plan just to hunker down and grit our way through it?" Wildstein replied "Yes and yes" and forwarded these e-mails to Baroni. Wildstein sought advice from Drewniak, with the two meeting in person on December 4. On December 6, Wildstein announced he would resign at the end of the year, saying the response to the traffic lanes closure had become "a distraction". At a December 13 press conference, Christie announced the immediate resignations of Baroni and Wildstein.

== David Samson allegations ==
In the wake of the lane closings, the Port Authority's chairman David Samson was the subject of media reports alleging ethical violations and conflicts of interest. It was alleged that Samson's law firm and their clients profited from dealings with the Port Authority and from projects involving New Jersey government financing or tax incentives. It was also reported that Christie benefited politically and his allies benefited financially during Samson's term as chairman. Patrick Foye, the Port Authority's executive director, asserted that Samson lacked the moral authority to run the agency.

Calls for Samson's resignation or removal came from New Jersey officials and media sources, including The Star-Ledger, the Daily News of New York, The Record, and The New York Times. On March 4, the freeholders in Bergen County, where Fort Lee is located, called for the resignation of Samson and the other five New Jersey appointed commissioners, with the commissioners faulted for failure to exercise proper oversight.

In February 2014, Christie stood firmly behind his support of Samson as PA chairman.

On March 28, 2014, Christie announced that Samson had offered his resignation from the Port Authority, effective immediately. They both agreed with the recommended Port Authority reforms in the March 26 report commissioned by the governor's office for an investigation of Bridgegate allegations. The report did not mention any involvement by Samson (who had refused to be interviewed) in any Bridgegate events, or any of the other allegations during his role as PA chairman. On April 29, 2014, Christie nominated John J. Degnan, a former state attorney general, as Samson's replacement, later confirmed by the New Jersey state senate.

On July 14, 2016, Samson pleaded guilty to a felony for conspiring to impede an airplane hangar project that was important to United Airlines in order to force the airline to reinstate a discontinued flight from Newark Airport to Columbia, South Carolina. U.S. Attorney Paul J. Fishman declined to say whether Samson would be cooperating in the Bridgegate case.

== Possible motives ==
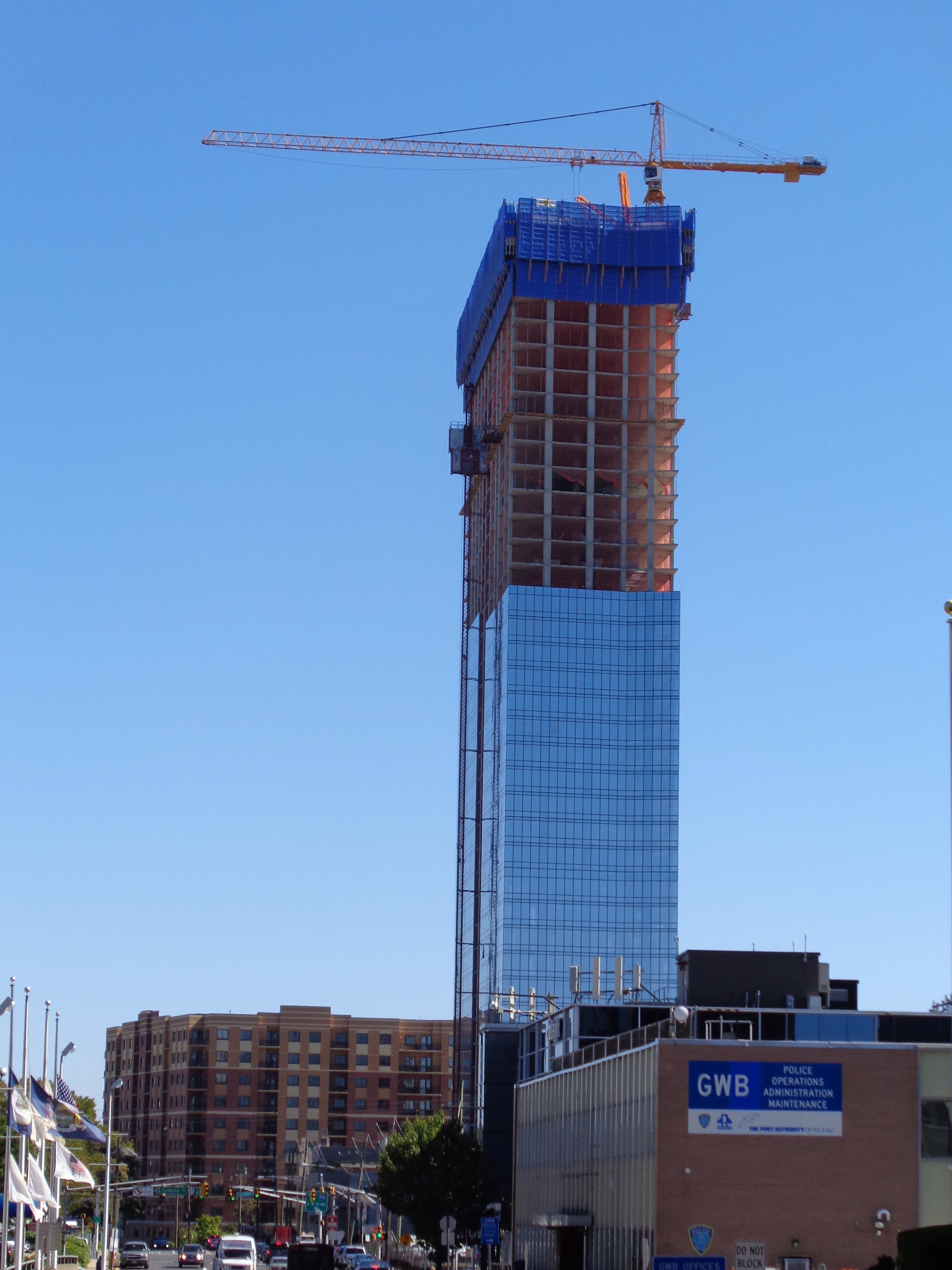
The Modern high-rise residential building under construction at the Hudson Lights redevelopment. Looking east from George Washington Bridge Plaza.

The May 2015 indictments of Wildstein, Baroni and Kelly contend that the lane closures were political retribution against Fort Lee mayor Mark Sokolich, a Democrat, for not supporting Christie in the 2013 New Jersey gubernatorial election. Sokolich initially claimed that he was asked for an endorsement once, in the spring of 2013, months before the August "time for some traffic problems in Fort Lee" e-mail by Bridget Kelly to David Wildstein. Although the two men are from different parties and an endorsement would normally not be expected, Christie ran on a platform of bipartisanship and had secured the endorsement of many other Democratic officials.

In an interview on February 6, 2014, with The Record, Sokolich said that the Christie administration had courted his endorsement over a period of time going back to around 2010, when Christie invited Sokolich and a handful of other mayors, including Hoboken's Dawn Zimmer, to have lunch at the governor's mansion in Princeton. Christie was shown in a picture talking with local mayors in a lineup, including Sokolich, after a news conference in Teaneck on December 8, 2011. In 2012, Sokolich and his cousins were given a personal tour of the 9/11 Memorial Plaza by Wildstein, who repeatedly told Sokolich, "I've been told to be nice to you." Matt Mowers, regional political director for Christie's re-election campaign, who had previously worked in the governor's intergovernmental affairs office, met with Sokolich regularly in 2013 and told him about other Democrats who endorsed Christie for governor. On at least three occasions, Sokolich noted that Mowers brought up the subject of Sokolich's possible endorsement. Sokolich eventually supported Barbara Buono, Christie's Democratic opponent in the 2013 election. Christie said at his January 9, 2014, press conference that Sokolich was "never on my radar screen" and that he would not "have been able to pick him [Sokolich] out of a lineup".

E-mails indicated that Wildstein and Baroni were aware the closures would harm Sokolich. In an e-mail from Wildstein responding to Bill Stepien, Wildstein wrote "It will be a tough November for this little Serbian", derogatorily referring to Sokolich, who is Croatian-American. Baroni referred to "Serbia" in text messages in another apparent reference to Mayor Sokolich.

The May 2015 indictment, citing text messages between Wildstein, Baroni, and Kelly, contended that the lane closures were designed to have maximum impact upon motorists and the city of Fort Lee. The closures targeted the first day of school, and deliberately steered cars to the cash lane, so as to maximize traffic disruption in the surrounding areas. The New York Times reported that "legal papers show the three plotting like petulant and juvenile pranksters, using government resources, time and personnel to punish a public official whose sole offense was failing to endorse their political patron. The three were in constant contact, brazenly using government e-mails, their tone sometimes almost giddy. They even gave the increasingly desperate mayor of Fort Lee their own version of the silent treatment."

Another theory had claimed that the closures were intended to affect Sokolich's promotion of Hudson Lights, a $1 billion redevelopment project that was underway at the Fort Lee bridge access point. It has been noted that "the Hudson Lights project is a billion-dollar project because it offers unparalleled access to the George Washington Bridge. But take away that access and it's no longer a billion-dollar project." In a September 12, 2013 e-mail to Bill Baroni, during the time when the closure was still on-going, Mayor Sokolich raised concerns about the redevelopment project, asking "What do I do when our billion-dollar development is put on line at the end of next year?"

Another theory was that the retaliation was for Sokolich's opposition to the PA's recent toll hike.

On January 9, 2014, Steven Fulop, Mayor of Jersey City, alleged that he was also targeted for political reprisals by the Christie administration for declining to endorse Christie in the 2013 governor election. His claim may be supported by a September 9, 2013, e-mail by David Wildstein after Bridget Kelly asked about his response to Fort Lee mayor Sokolich about the toll lane closures. Wildstein responded: "Radio silence. His name comes right after Mayor Fulop."

== Investigations ==
According to The New York Times, the e-mails discussing the lane closure "could represent evidence that government resources were used for political purposes, a potential crime". According to legal experts, federal prosecutors also could "examine whether the obstruction of interstate commerce on the bridge between New Jersey and New York" violated federal law, and either federal or state prosecutors also might "build a cover-up case, rather than one based on the traffic tie-ups themselves".

On January 17, 2014, Alan Zegas, Wildstein's attorney, said that his client would offer to shed light on the scandal on the condition that he was given immunity from prosecution from the relevant federal and state law enforcement agencies. There had not been any offer of immunity from the office of the United States Attorney for the District of New Jersey.

A joint legislative committee, New Jersey Legislative Select Committee on Investigation, was created on January 27, 2014, to take over the original investigation by the Assembly Transportation Committee.

=== Assembly Transportation Committee investigation ===
On October 2, 2013, Assemblyman John Wisniewski, a Democrat, said that he would open an investigation with the Assembly Transportation Committee to determine whether or not the lane closures were politically motivated.

The first hearing was held on November 25, 2013, for which Bill Baroni attended on behalf of the PA. Baroni, who was not sworn in to testify under oath, said that David Wildstein had ordered a study to determine if closing two of the Fort Lee toll lanes, and assigning them to mainline traffic, would shorten delays for commuters from other parts of New Jersey. Baroni argued that it was unfair that Fort Lee drivers occupied three out of the 12 lanes on the upper level, despite being only 4.5% of all traffic. Committee members pointed out that 4.5% was based on the number of E-ZPass users from Fort Lee that use all approaches to the bridge, and that vehicles from many other towns, besides Fort Lee, use that Fort Lee entrance. He admitted the actual percentage of vehicles, which utilize that Fort Lee entrance, could be higher than 4.5% of overall traffic, and also failed to mention that there are actually 29 operating toll lanes for the bridge when comparing the three dedicated toll lanes for this entrance.

Wildstein turned over heavily redacted documents in response to the subpoena.

Baroni said that with the reduction in Fort Lee toll lanes, traffic data showed that the mainline traffic travel times in the express lanes' approach to the bridge were about four minutes faster on two days. He apologized for what he acknowledged was the agency's failure to properly communicate with local officials and the public in advance of this project. Following the hearing, Wisniewski called the closures at best "clumsy and ham-handed" and at worst "political mischief by a political appointee and another political appointee that they did not make available for testimony", referring to Wildstein's non-attendance.

Immediately after Baroni made his presentation, a text exchange occurred, according to subpoenaed documents from Wildstein. Wildstein said "you did great" and said that the "Trenton feedback" was good.

Sen. Kevin O'Toole released a statement that day to the media, echoing various talking points from Baroni's presentation. All of this suggested that O'Toole had prior communications with Wildstein and possibly Baroni.

Wisniewski subpoenaed Foye and career PA staffers to give sworn testimony on December 9, 2013, about the lane closures. The committee had gotten subpoena power only because the PA had been stonewalling the delivery of documents in an unrelated investigation of a controversial toll hike. "Had the Port Authority simply complied with the requests, there probably wouldn't have been a rationale for the committee to get subpoena power", Wisniewski later said.

Robert Durando, George Washington Bridge manager, said that he feared retaliation if he did not follow Wildstein's orders to close two toll lanes to local traffic and not notify local officials or the public about these changes. Durando and Cedrick Fulton, director of tunnels, bridges, and terminals, both said that they were personally told by Wildstein that he would notify Foye of the change. Foye said that he was unaware of any traffic study until he ordered its termination on September 13, 2013, and blamed Wildstein for the toll lane changes, while believing Baroni was involved in the planning. When Wildstein called Fulton on September 6, 2013, to inform him that the lane closures would begin on September 9, Fulton explained that he thought that was unusual since planning for traffic disruptions on major facilities typically starts years in advance. He said that he told Wildstein, "This will not end well", due to expected traffic problems.

Redacted documents were turned over under a subpoena to investigators of the committee and those documents were turned over to The New York Times and other news media. On January 8, 2014, The Star-Ledger, The Record, The New York Times, and other news media published e-mails and text messages tying Bridget Kelly, deputy chief of staff in Christie's office, to the closure. The content of the released communications said that the lane closures were ordered with the knowledge that they would cause a massive traffic jam. Christie released a statement later that day denying knowledge of the scandal, rebuking Kelly for her role in the lane closure event, and vowing that "people will be held responsible for their actions" in the affair.

A Republican member of the Assembly committee complained that the Republican members had not been given sufficient time to review the subpoenaed documents in advance of hearing testimony: "Allowing Republican committee members less than 24 hours to review more than 900 pages of information is a disservice to the bipartisan committee process ... As chairman, he [Wisniewski] should be impartial and provide committee members, regardless of their political affiliation, a reasonable opportunity to review documents he has had access to for weeks".

On January 9, 2014, David Wildstein, who appeared with his attorney, Alan Zegas, refused to testify before the committee, invoking the right against self-incrimination in the federal and New Jersey constitutions. The committee voted to hold Wildstein in contempt, asserting that the right against self-incrimination did not apply in such a hearing.

Wisniewski said "I do think laws have been broken. Public resources—the bridge, police officers—all were used for a political purpose, for some type of retribution, and that violates the law". He called it "unbelievable" that Christie did not know anything about his aides' plans, stating: "It's hard to really accept the governor's statement that he knew nothing until the other morning". He also raised the issue of the potential for Christie's impeachment if Christie was aware of his aides' actions.

=== Special legislative investigative committees ===
On January 16, 2014, the New Jersey Assembly and Senate each created committees to take over the investigation from the Assembly Transportation Committee. The Assembly committee hired Reid Schar as special counsel, who would assist in the investigation. Schar was a former assistant U.S. attorney from Illinois who assisted in the prosecution of former Illinois governor Rod Blagojevich.

The New Jersey Assembly re-authorized the legislative subpoena powers, which were immediately used to subpoena two organizations and 18 individuals in Christie's administration, the governor's office, his 2013 election campaign, and the Port Authority, but not Christie himself. Those receiving subpoenas were instructed to submit by February 3, 2014, all documents and communications, going back to September 1, 2012, related to the reassignment of the two toll lanes during the week of September 9, 2013, and any attempts to conceal the activities or reasons related to that incident.

==== New Jersey Legislative Select Committee on Investigation ====
On January 21, 2014, Assemblyman Wisniewski and State Senate majority leader Loretta Weinberg, whose district includes Fort Lee, announced that the Senate and Assembly committees were being merged into a bi-partisan joint investigative committee of 12 members, and that they would co-chair the New Jersey Legislative Select Committee on Investigation. While the committee initially focused on the Bridgegate scandal, it had the power to investigate other allegations against the Christie administration.

On January 24, 2014, the members of the bi-partisan committee were announced, consisting of eight Assembly representatives (five Democrats and three Republicans), and four Senators (three Democrats and one Republican). At the time, 40% of the members of the New Jersey Legislature were Republican. Besides the two Democratic co-chairs, members included Assemblywoman Marlene Caride (D-Bergen), Assemblyman Michael Patrick Carroll (R-Morris), Senator Nia Gill (D-Essex), Senator Linda Greenstein (D-Middlesex), Assembly Majority Leader Louis Greenwald (D-Camden), Assemblywoman Amy Handlin (R-Monmouth), Assemblywoman Valerie Huttle (D-Bergen), Assemblywoman Holly Schepisi (R-Bergen), Assemblywoman Bonnie Watson Coleman (D-Mercer), and an unnamed Republican senator. On January 27, both houses voted unanimously to combine the investigations, maintaining the partisan balance, and announced Senator Kevin O'Toole's (R-Essex) to fill the last spot, despite his mention in a December 5 e-mail from Wildstein to Michael Drewniak.

As a precautionary move, the new investigative committee re-issued subpoenas that had been sent earlier, with the requested records still due on the original deadline, February 3.

In a January 31, 2014, letter to Reid Schar, general counsel for the legislative committee, Kevin Marino, the attorney for Stepien, said that he would not submit anything in response to their subpoena and requested its withdrawal, citing his client's Fifth Amendment right and New Jersey common law privileges against self-incrimination, with regard to the criminal inquiry underway by the U.S. Attorney, and Fourth Amendment and New Jersey Constitution (Article I, paragraph 7) rights against unreasonable search and seizure. Wisniewski said the subpoena was perfectly sound, and that Schar would review the attorney's objections and consider the committee's legal options. Michael Critchley, the attorney for Kelly, submitted a letter that his client would not comply with the subpoena based on similar claims.

On February 3, 2014, Wisniewski and Weinberg issued a statement, without details, that some responses to subpoenas had been received and that extensions for submissions had been granted to others. Mark Sheridan, an attorney for Christie's campaign organization, said it had been granted an extension while it awaited an opinion from the state Election Law Enforcement Commission, which on February 11 allowed the campaign to use existing funds and raise funds to pay its legal bills in response to the NJ Legislature and federal subpoenas for general evidence. It could not use those funds in response to any criminal investigations.

On February 10, 2014, the committee voted to reject the objections raised by the lawyers of Stepien and Kelly to not comply with the subpoenas for their records, and to compel Stepien and Kelly to produce all related documents, instructing special counsel Reid Schar to "take all necessary steps" to enforce the subpoenas. All four Republicans abstained in the vote. They claimed that they did not have enough time to review the legal arguments, including Fifth Amendment rights, presented in Schar's legal brief countering the lawyers' objections.

On the same day, the committee announced it was issuing 18 new subpoenas to individuals within the governor's office and the Port Authority that also included new recipients, as well as the governor's office itself and Christie's 2013 re-election campaign. The new recipients included assistants to Foye, Wildstein, Baroni, and Kelly. Other new PA recipients included Christie referral, Philip Kwon, deputy general counsel, Christie appointee William "Pat" Schuber, a commissioner, who had served in a variety of local, county, and state elected positions in New Jersey, and Steve Coleman, deputy director of media relations. One of the subpoenas was sent to the New Jersey State Police aviation unit for flight information records when Christie used a state helicopter during the toll lane closings. An agency spokesperson said that Christie had not used one to fly over the Fort Lee area during the lane closings. The subpoenas also sought information related to any dossiers compiled by Christie's re-election campaign and his governor's office on Fort Lee mayor Sokolich.

The subpoenas sought information for records from staff at the PA and the governor's office related to preparations for Baroni's presentation to the Assembly Transportation Committee's November 25, 2013, hearing. Wildstein's attorney had claimed that Wildstein was present during some of the times when Kwon, who attended the committee hearing, helped prepare Baroni over several days for his presentation about a traffic study and other issues related to the local toll lane closures. A PA spokesman said: "Meeting with a witness prior to testimony is a routine function of any lawyer and any attempt to assign ulterior motives to this general practice is unwarranted." Kwon served as first assistant attorney general during Christie's first term as governor and previously worked for him in the U.S. Attorney General's office in New Jersey. He was also Christie's 2012 Supreme Court justice nominee, who was blocked by Democratic state legislative members.

One of the subpoenas sought documents from the PANYNJ related to toll increases for the tunnels and bridges and Christie's 2010 decision to cancel the Access to the Region's Core project, specifically with regard to projected cost overruns. It also requested the names of job candidates sent by Christie's office to the agency.

On February 19, 2014, it was reported that the co-chairs said that the committee would need to question Senator O'Toole about what he knew, including any communications with Baroni and/or Wildstein, prior to Baroni's November 25 presentation to the Assembly Transportation Committee. A previously redacted November 25 text message from Wildstein to Baroni said that O'Toole was ready with a statement, which was issued to the media, that echoed talking points from Baroni's same day presentation and attacked the Democrats investigating these issues. O'Toole followed up with an editorial in The Record that elaborated on these talking points and attacks. It raised further questions on whether O'Toole should continue to serve on the committee.

On February 28, 2014, Bonnie Watson Coleman withdrew from the committee, a day after she called on Christie to resign as governor due to the culture of bullying she says was fostered under him. On March 21, 2014, Assembly Speaker Vincent Pietro named Assemblyman Paul D. Moriarty (D-Camden) to fill that vacancy.

On March 31, 2014, Wisniewski announced the intention to subpoena notes, records, and interviews from the inquiry conducted for the governor's office by Randy Mastro of Gibson, Dunn & Crutcher, since they had not been made available to the committee. Wisniewski said that there would be questions about the objectivity and independence of that investigation if subpoenaed items were withheld. In response, Mastro released a statement saying that the governor's office did not release interview transcripts because of its cooperation with the U.S. Attorney's Office's investigation and would respond to any subpoena request, when received. These matters could go to court if the governor's office tried to exercise any rights not to provide subpoenaed items. On April 11, 2014, the committee received the list of 75 persons interviewed by Mastro's team. Wisniewski said that he expected all existing interview materials in "whatever form", or the committee would issue a subpoena. The interview notes, marked "privileged and confidential attorney opinion work product", were turned over to the legislative committee and U.S. Attorney's Office, and publicly released online on April 14, without a subpoena. Wisniewski and Weinberg said in a joint statement that the committee reserved the right to request or subpoena further information, if required.

On April 9, 2014, the committee's investigation was dealt a setback when New Jersey Superior Court Judge Mary Jacobson ruled that Stepien and Kelly do not have to hand over subpoenaed documents since the subpoenas were written too broadly, like a "fishing expedition". The judge also said that the subpoenas, as written, "clearly violate" federal and state protections against self-incrimination and unlawful search and seizure. The ruling said that Kelly and Stepien could assert their Fifth Amendment rights because of the investigation by the U.S. Attorney in New Jersey, and these documents could provide a "link in the chain of evidence needed to prosecute the claimant for a federal crime". The judge suggested that the committee could consider reissuing subpoenas with more limited document requests that could be acceptable. Legal experts agreed with that approach, and also suggested that electronic copies of the original subpoenaed documents could be obtained through subpoenas of system servers that store those documents since individuals do not have any personal right to bar the subpoena of a server.

The judge also expressed reservations about having jurisdictional powers to compel the turnover of subpoenaed documents since "the committee has the power to enforce its own subpoenas through orders to compel and grant immunity in return". The lawyers for Stepien and Kelly have contended that the committee could grant their clients immunity from criminal prosecution in exchange for the documents. Reid Schar said that the committee had no such powers.

Wisniewski forecast that "north of ten" people would be subpoenaed for testimony. On April 22, 2014, he announced the joint committee's first subpoenas for oral testimony, initially calling four witnesses to testify: Christina Genovese Renna (former director of intergovernmental affairs), William "Pat" Schuber (a PA commissioner), Patrick Foye, and Michael Drewniak. All four agreed to testify. After a subpoena on April 29 calling Matt Mowers (former campaign staffer who reportedly asked Sokolich for an endorsement, and who has been cooperating with the committee), and some schedule adjustments, testimony was set for May 6 (Renna), May 13 (Drewniak), May 20 (Mowers), and June 3 (Foye and Schuber). However, the committee later postponed Foye's testimony, at the request of the US Attorney. Kevin O'Dowd (chief of staff and nominee for attorney general) was subpoenaed to testify on June 9. The committee was considering issuing a second set of more narrowly focused subpoenas to Bridget Kelly and Bill Stepien. Christie would not be subpoenaed.

On May 7, 2014, the committee announced a subpoena for documents and records from Michael DuHaime (Christie's chief political strategist). According to the Gibson Dunn memo on the DuHaime interview, he told Christie "on or about" December 11, 2013, that Wildstein, Stepien, and Kelly had knowledge of the "traffic study" beforehand. During Christie's December 13 news conference, he denied involvement by anyone in his office.

Committee work slowed in July 2014, and they postponed or skipped some witnesses' testimony, in deference to the federal investigation. On July 17, it heard testimony from Regina Egea, Christie's Chief of Staff, who had learned of the lane closures on September 13, 2013, after their reversal and who had later assisted Bill Baroni prepare for his testimony, but she was not accused of wrongdoing.

=== Port Authority investigation ===
On October 16, 2013, the Port Authority announced that it would conduct an internal review. Its inspector general opened an investigation on December 10. On February 16, 2014, Executive Director Pat Foye ordered the inspector general and PA Police Chief Louis Koumoutsos to examine PA Police Lieutenant Thomas "Chip" Michaels for his role in chauffeuring Wildstein on an observation tour on the first day of the closures and allegations of PA Police officers telling frustrated motorists to direct their ire at Mayor Sokolich. Michaels had at least one day's advance knowledge of the closure. Lt. Michaels and his brother Jeffrey Michaels (a GOP lobbyist in Trenton) are childhood friends of Christie.

The PA investigation reportedly interviewed only 3 people (Wildstein not among them), and was finished within a few weeks, although PA officials still continued to claim "ongoing investigation" a month later, when deflecting reporters' questions.

=== U.S. Attorney investigation ===
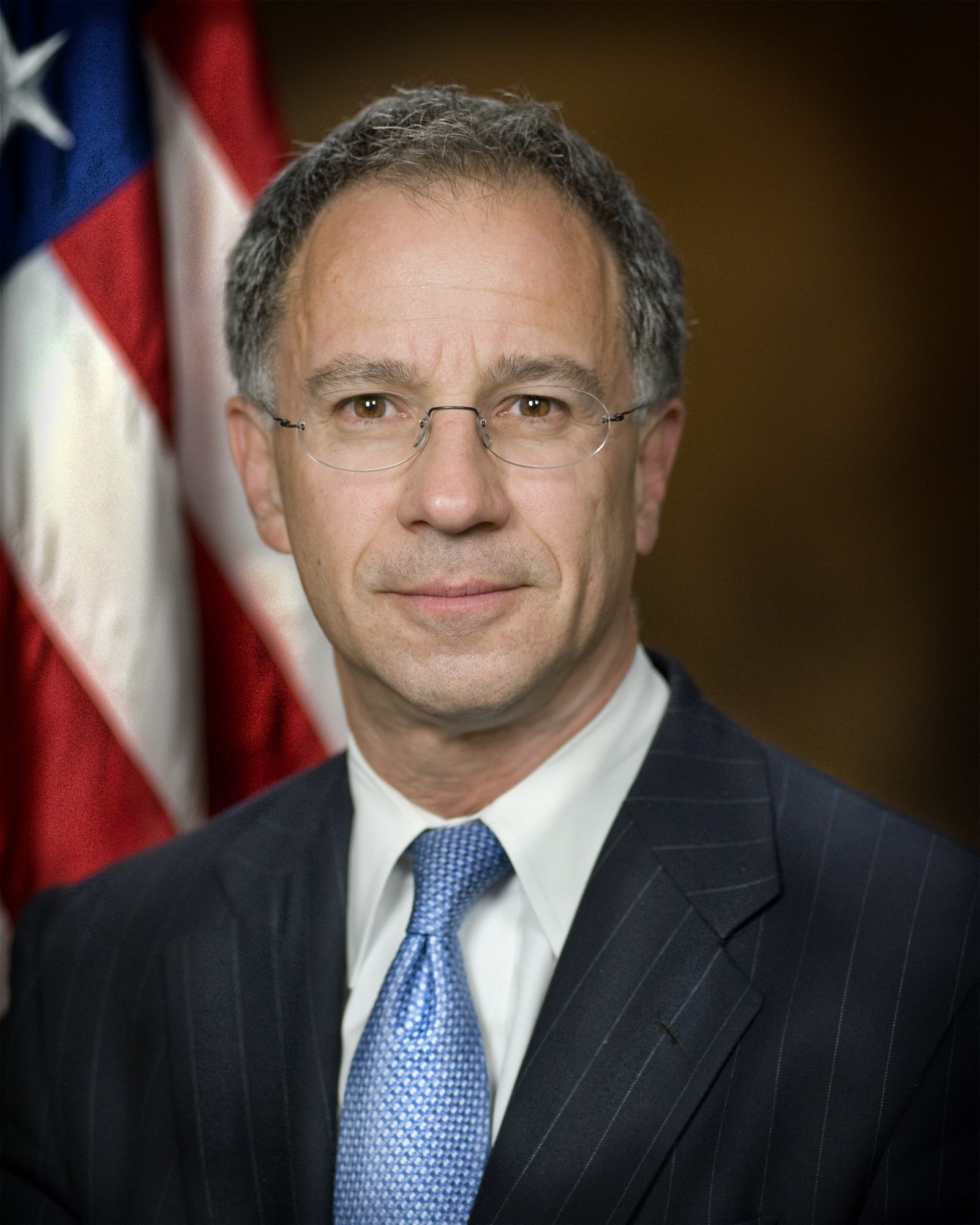
U.S. Attorney Paul J. Fishman

On January 9, 2014, Paul J. Fishman, the United States Attorney for the District of New Jersey, opened a preliminary federal inquiry into matters related to the toll lane closures. Fishman's office has jurisdiction because the Port Authority was created via an interstate compact between New York and New Jersey. Rebekah Carmichael, public affairs officer for the U.S. attorney's office, said in a statement: "The Port Authority Office of Inspector General has referred the matter to us, and our office is reviewing it to determine whether a federal law was implicated."

The U.S. Attorney, whose office did not identify who was being served, began an official investigation and issued grand jury subpoenas for documents related to the Bridgegate scandal to various people and entities. Mark Sheridan, a partner with Patton Boggs, which had been retained to represent Christie's 2013 re-election campaign organization and the New Jersey Republican State Committee in connection with investigations into this scandal, said on January 23, 2014, that both organizations had received subpoenas. On February 3, Christie said that his governor's office received a subpoena. The Federal Bureau of Investigation assisted the U.S. Attorney in its investigation.

Prosecutors at the U.S. Attorney's Office met with Mayor Sokolich on February 21 and Governor Christie's press secretary, Michael Drewniak, as a "fact witness", on February 27. Drewniak, who had been subpoenaed by the legislative committee, was referenced in several previously subpoenaed documents released by the committee from others.

The United States Attorney for the Southern District of New York, in Manhattan, issued a subpoena to PA Chairman David Samson on March 7, 2014, but then rescinded it on March 10, because of overlap with the Fishman investigation based in New Jersey.

As part of the criminal investigation, Drewniak testified on April 4, 2014, in Newark before the grand jury investigating the scandal. His lawyer, Anthony Iacullo, said he was not a target of the investigation. ABC News reported that this was the first confirmation of a convened grand jury, which can meet for up to 18 months (with further extensions possible), for interviewing witnesses. It has the power to indict, subpoena, and interview witnesses without their attorneys being present. The New York Times reported that it was the same grand jury that had reviewed subpoenaed documents.

On April 7, 2014, it was reported that David Wildstein met with federal prosecutors in Newark for several days during the week of March 31 and Charlie McKenna met with investigators in mid-January in Fishman's office.

On April 25, 2014, it was reported that Fishman had subpoenaed the New Jersey Legislative Select Committee on Investigation for "any and all records" they have gathered, with delivery due on May 2. Committee co-chairs Weinberg and Wisniewski said that they would comply, and that the request "reaffirms" their progress.

On May 1, 2014, it was reported that the federal grand jury had subpoenaed PA attorney Phillip Kwon, who had reportedly assisted preparing Bill Baroni's unsworn November 25, 2013, "traffic study" testimony to the Assembly Transportation Committee, and that Kwon had asked the PA to cover his legal fees.

On September 18, 2014, WNBC-TV4 (New York) reported that unnamed federal investigators told them that thus far no evidence that Christie knew in advance of the closures or had directed them was found, but cautioned that the investigation was ongoing and that no final determination had been made. That evening's NBC report by Brian Williams, "federal [Bridgegate] charges are now ruled out for Chris Christie", was retracted.

In January 2015, it was reported that Christie was interviewed by federal prosecutors and FBI agents in December 2014. He reportedly met with investigators voluntarily to give his side of the story. The meeting lasted two hours and was described as "professional, collegial and courteous".

The federal investigation led to Wildstein's guilty plea and the prosecution of Baroni and Kelly.

=== U.S. Senate inquiry ===
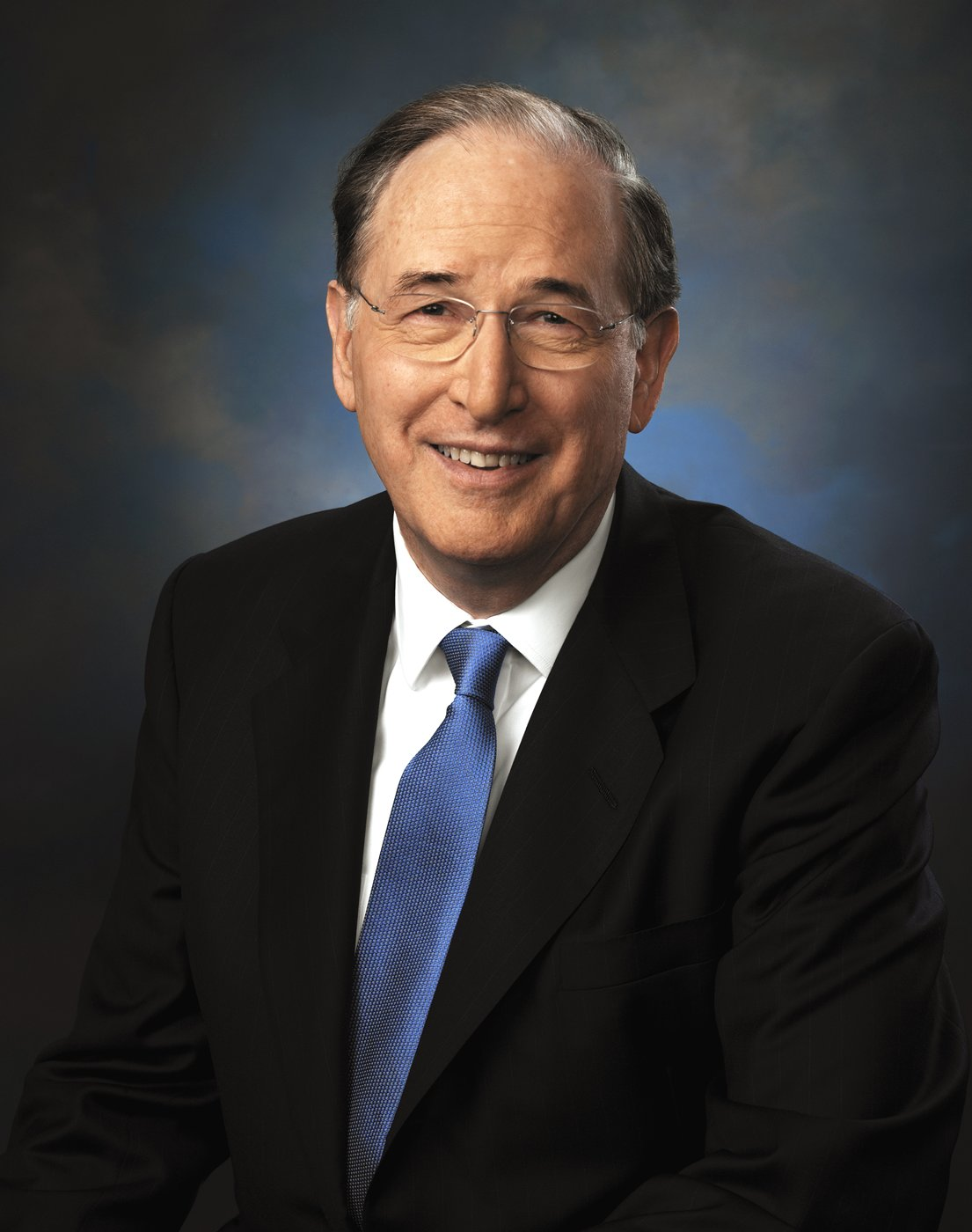
Senator Jay Rockefeller

The United States Senate Committee on Commerce, Science and Transportation had opened its own inquiry into the closure. Committee chairman Jay Rockefeller (D-West Virginia) had written Samson and Vice Chairman Scott Rechler in December 2013 to demand answers about how the Port Authority handled the closure and its aftermath. According to his letter, Rockefeller, who has long been critical about shortcomings in the PA's operations, was concerned about what seemed to be evidence of "political appointees abusing their power to hamper interstate commerce and safety without public notice". It also said that based on a review of recent testimony before the New Jersey Assembly Transportation Committee, it appeared that there was no traffic study underway. Rockefeller also asked the United States Department of Transportation to conduct its own review of the incident.

The PA's written response to Rockefeller's questions, signed by board secretary Karen Eastman, restated and summarized the December 9, 2013, testimony by Foye and two other PA managers before the Assembly Transportation Committee. It said that the closures had been ordered by Wildstein on September 6, 2013, despite various PA engineers expressing their concerns, particularly about more traffic congestion on local streets and no advance notice to Fort Lee officials. Wildstein, the letter said, had ordered bridge officials not to notify Foye of the closures. It also revealed that the PA's board had not approved Baroni's November 25 presentation before that committee, that the closures were part of a traffic study. It showed that PA's procedures for planning and internal notifications for any traffic study were not followed. However, the letter did not reveal any reason why the closures were ordered. It characterized the incident as "aberrational". Rockefeller declared that based on the PA's response, there was "zero evidence" that a "legitimate" traffic study had been planned. He also said that the letter revealed the PA had not followed its own procedures for lane closures.

=== Other closure-related probes ===
The lane-closure scandal also sparked inquiries by the Manhattan District Attorney's office and the U.S. Securities and Exchange Commission. The SEC and Manhattan DA probes are focusing on the Pulaski Skyway, an elevated highway linking Newark and Jersey City. On June 23, 2014, The New York Times reported that the inquiries are focusing on possible securities law violations caused by Christie's use of Port Authority funds to pay for repairs to the Skyway in 2010 and 2011, using money that was to be used on a new Hudson River rail tunnel that Christie canceled in October 2010.

== Trial of Baroni and Kelly ==
=== Indictments ===
On May 1, 2015, the U.S. Attorney unsealed indictments, charging Bill Baroni and Bridget Anne Kelly with nine counts of conspiracy, fraud and related charges. These included conspiracy to commit fraud by "knowingly converting and intentionally misapplying property of an organization receiving federal benefits". That same day, prosecutors released David Wildstein's plea bargain. He had agreed in January to plead guilty to conspiracy to commit fraud and conspiracy against civil rights. Wildstein, whose sentencing was delayed until after the trial, agreed to testify against Baroni and Kelly.

The indictments charge that the lane closures were retribution against Sokolich for not endorsing Christie. Fishman said that Wildstein had corroborated the allegations in the indictments, and said that the three officials "agreed to and did use public resources to carry out a vendetta and exact retribution", and that they "callously victimized the people of Fort Lee". Kelly vigorously denied wrongdoing. Baroni argued that his indictment was improperly based on the unsworn testimony and documents he had provided to the legislative committee in 2014, but prosecutors countered that he had not been offered immunity at that time.

The trial for Baroni and Kelly, originally scheduled to begin July 7, 2015, was repeatedly rescheduled, first to November 16, 2015, to allow more time for the defense to review the large volume of documents provided by the prosecutors, then to May 16, 2016, and then to September 12, 2016.

Prosecutors asked the court that those documents, about 1.5 million pages, be kept from public view in order to protect the privacy of unindicted co-conspirators, but the defense teams opposed that proposal as overly broad, and preventing collaboration with anyone who could assist but would not be a witness. U.S. District Court Judge Susan Wigenton ruled on July 7 in favor of the prosecutors, writing, "The Confidential Discovery Materials shall not be disclosed by defense counsel to anyone other than the defendants and any agent working at the direction of defense counsel in this matter." thereby preventing public access to certain items presented as evidence in the criminal case. Media outlets—including The Associated Press, The New York Times, The Wall Street Journal, The Star-Ledger, and The Record—requested a hearing with Wigenton to ask that the ban be lifted or modified arguing for the First Amendment right of access to criminal court records.

Those news organizations together asked the court to release the prosecution's list of unindicted co-conspirators. On February 17, 2016, U.S. Attorney Paul J. Fishman's office filed a brief to Wigenton requesting that the Bridgegate records remain sealed so that the list of uncharged third-party co-conspirators not be made public. Co-conspirators refers to "individuals the government believes may have known about the plot to abruptly shut down access lanes to the bridge to cause massive traffic disruptions, but were not charged". Fishman claimed that it was a policy of the United States Department of Justice "to avoid unnecessary public references to wrongdoing" by unindicted co-conspirator because they have no "evidentiary value" in the criminal matter. If the names were made public, then public employees or appointed officials, who were said to be involved in the lane closures, would not have the "opportunity to challenge that information in court". Their names would be revealed if they were relevant at a future trial or if the Government "moves for the admission of an out-of-court statement made in furtherance of the conspiracy by an unindicted coconspirator".

On May 10, 2016, Judge Wigenton ruled for the list's release, which she said named individuals "whom the government has sufficient evidence to designate as having joined the conspiracy". Christie predicted that he would not appear on the list. One of the men on the list filed an emergency motion, as John Doe, and the release was delayed. On September 7, 2016, a federal appellate court ruled that the list, and the identity of John Doe, would remain secret for the time being, but that "the time may come, perhaps at trial".

The media also asked for a separate existing list, which Kelly's attorney characterized as individuals "who were not unindicted co-conspirators, but whom the government believed were aware of the alleged criminal conspiracy charged in this case but did not join the conspiracy".

=== Trial and conviction ===
The jury of seven women and five men, plus four alternates, was seated on September 14, 2016. RNC member and former law partner Bill Palatucci, described as Christie's closest counselor, might be called to testify.

In its opening statement on September 19, 2016, the prosecution said that at the World Trade Center site on the third day of the closure, "the evidence will show that [Wildstein and Baroni] bragged [to Christie] about the fact that there were traffic problems in Fort Lee, and that Mayor Sokolich was not getting his calls returned", and that Wildstein would testify and "admit that he was the one who came up with that idea".

Over the course of a month, prosecutors presented their case. David Wildstein appeared in week two, giving over eight days of testimony. After Wildstein left, prosecutors moved to secondary witnesses. On October 13, 2016, prosecutors concluded their arguments, having spent nearly four weeks laying an argument. The case moved to the defense. Over the next two weeks, the jury heard arguments from the defense, with Bridget Anne Kelly in the spotlight, saying it was "crude humor". Bill Baroni maintained the argument that the traffic jams were part of a legitimate study to determine "whether congestion on the main approaches to the toll plaza could be reduced if the lanes earmarked for Fort Lee were eliminated". The case on October 26 concluded with the defense resting.

On November 4, 2016, after deliberating the testimony of 35 witnesses (including the defendants) and other evidence over the course of five days, the jury found Baroni and Kelly guilty on all counts.

=== Sentencing ===
In 2017, Baroni was sentenced to 24 months in prison; Kelly was sentenced to 18 months; Wildstein was sentenced to three years' probation and 500 hours of community service.

=== Appeals and resentencing ===
Baroni and Kelly appealed their convictions, and on November 27, 2018, the U.S. Court of Appeals for the Third Circuit upheld a majority of the convictions, but overturned the determination that Kelly and Baroni had violated the civil rights of travelers, finding there is no established civil right to interstate travel. The court directed that Kelly and Baroni be resentenced on the remaining seven counts of the indictment. Baroni was resentenced to a reduced prison term of 18 months followed by one year of supervised release. Kelly was resentenced to a reduced prison term of 13 months and was ordered to pay slightly over $14,000 to the State of New Jersey in restitution for the lost toll revenue during the bridge closure.

Kelly's lawyers filed a petition for a writ of certiorari in the Supreme Court of the United States, asking the Court to hear their appeal. The court agreed to take up the case, Kelly v. United States, in the 2019 term. Oral argument was held on January 14, 2020. Observers to the Court stated they felt the justices were sympathetic to Baroni and Kelly's side, questioning the broadness of the fraud charges the two were convicted on. On May 7, 2020, the court ruled unanimously to overturn the conviction. The Supreme Court held that Baroni and Kelly for no reason other than political payback reshuffled the lanes on the George Washington Bridge. Justice Elena Kagan wrote that although the move jeopardized the residents of Fort Lee, they concluded the charge of fraud could not be upheld since no property or money was involved, and that "not every corrupt act by state or local officials is a federal crime".

== Official misconduct case against Christie ==
Teaneck citizen activist William J. Brennan filed a complaint in September 2016 in the Fort Lee municipal court, alleging official misconduct by Christie. The complaint specifically said that Christie had failed to stop the closure then in progress when, according to Wildstein's sworn testimony, Christie heard about it from Baroni and Wildstein on Wednesday, September 11, 2013, the third day of the closure. The complaint alleged that Fort Lee and its mayor "were deprived the benefit and enjoyment of their community as a consequence of this intentional evil minded act".

In October 2016, Judge Roy F. McGeady, the presiding judge for the municipal courts in Bergen County, accepted jurisdiction based on the events having occurred in Fort Lee, and found that probable cause existed "to believe that an event of official misconduct was caused by Governor Christie". The judge therefore issued a summons. This put the case into the hands of the Bergen County prosecutor's office. Prosecutor Gurbir Grewal, who was appointed by Christie, recused himself from the case; state attorney general Christopher Porrino, who previously served as governor's office counsel, also recused himself from the case. Subordinates in their offices therefore handled the matter; the state Superior Court denied Brennan's request to appoint a special prosecutor.

In January 2017, a state Superior Court judge denied Christie's motion to dismiss the citizen's complaint, but also vacated the earlier finding of probable cause on the basis that Christie had been improperly denied his right to counsel at the October 2016 hearing; the court ordered a new hearing regarding the complaint. Later that month, prosecutors decided not to pursue charges against Christie. While prosecutors chose not to pursue the case, the Bergen County municipal judge ruled that the case had not been dismissed, and in February 2017, following a new hearing, the Bergen County municipal judge ruled that the case could proceed—saying "The court is satisfied that [Christie] had knowledge of the traffic problems in Fort Lee"—and issued a new criminal summons.

In March 2017, the Bergen County Prosecutor's Office dropped the complaint against Christie, writing to the Superior Court judge that "we do not believe that an official misconduct charge can be proven beyond a reasonable doubt".

== Gibson Dunn report ==
On January 16, 2014, the governor's office announced the hiring of Gibson, Dunn & Crutcher to assist with an internal review and cooperate with the U.S. Attorney's investigation. The firm also agreed to assist "with document retention and production in connection with the United States Attorney inquiry, and other appropriate inquires and requests for information" and review the governor's office operations and information flow. The lead attorney was Randy Mastro, a longtime associate of Rudy Giuliani, the former mayor of New York City and former United States Attorney. Mastro served under Giuliani as Deputy Mayor of New York City and Assistant US Attorney.

In February, Mastro requested interviews about the toll lane closures with Wildstein and with Sokolich and Kelly, who all declined and were not interviewed.

The report, released on March 27, 2014, found that Christie had no advance knowledge of the bridge "lane realignment", and did not know why it happened. It blamed Bridget Kelly and David Wildstein for orchestrating the toll lane closures. The report revealed that Wildstein said that he informed Christie of the ongoing lane closures during a September 11, 2013, memorial event, but asserted that Christie did not recall that exchange. It noted that Michael Drewniak said Wildstein appeared "anxious" during a dinner with him on December 4, 2013, and that Wildstein "had mentioned the Fort Lee traffic study to the Governor" while the lane closures were taking place. Drewniak said Wildstein told him that the plan to shut the lanes and attribute it to a "traffic study" were Wildstein's idea, and that Kelly and Bill Stepien had "some knowledge". The report also found "no evidence" that Stepien or Baroni knew of the improper motives for the lane closures, although they were aware that the lanes were to be closed and that traffic patterns were to be changed as a result.

After the report was released, Christie said he was shocked by the actions of his former aides and that "Sometimes, people do inexplicably stupid things."

The report said the lane closures were political retribution against Sokolich but did not identify the specific motive. However, it noted the day before her infamous "Time for some traffic problems in Fort Lee" message, Kelly confirmed that Sokolich would not endorse Christie. It said she was "irate" and "on fire" when a Christie aide met with Sokolich several days later.

The report relied on documents provided by the governor's office and interviews with 75 witnesses, including Christie and others from his administration, but no one interviewed had been at the Port Authority at the time of the lane closings. The interviews were not under oath. The report also was based on more than 250,000 documents, many of them e-mails and text messages. Transcripts of the interviews and the names of the interviewees were not released at the time the report was made public. It was estimated that the taxpayer-funded report cost more than $1 million. A separate section of the report rejected allegations by Mayor of Hoboken Dawn Zimmer that Lieutenant Governor Kim Guadagno and Richard Constable, director of the New Jersey Department of Community Affairs, had linked release of Hurricane Sandy relief funds to approval of a project represented by David Samson's law firm.

In April 2014, U.S. Internal Revenue Service filings disclosed that Gibson, Dunn & Crutcher donated $10,000 to the Republican Governors Association, of which Christie was then chairman. The contribution was made on March 18, 2014, nine days before release of the Mastro report. The firm donated $55,000 to the association from 2009 to 2012, when Christie was not its leader. It made no donations to the Democratic Governors Association from 2012 to 2014.

After Assemblyman Wisniewski gave a deadline of April 11, 2014, for providing the interview records, which were part of the basis of the report, or they would be subpoenaed, Gibson Dunn turned over on that date a list of 75 persons interviewed for the report. On April 14, the interview notes were turned over to the committee and U.S. Attorney's office, and publicly released. Gibson Dunn lawyers said that there were no recordings or verbatim transcripts of the interviews, prompting Wisniewski to characterize the conclusions from these interviews as "hearsay". There were nearly 370 instances in which the persons interviewed could not recall details about events they were asked to address.

The interview notes contained information that was downplayed or omitted from the original Mastro report, showing a governor's office in which government and political operations were deeply connected. They showed how the governor's office worked to secure Democratic endorsements and coordinated with Christie's election campaign to penalize mayors who did not endorse Christie in his re-election.

In July 2015, a federal court ruling ordered that materials used to prepare the report be made available to legal defense teams of those indicted.

=== Reaction to report ===
Critics attacked the report as a whitewash, which they claimed read more like a legal defense than an objective investigation. They noted investigators could not interview any of the most important figures in the scandal, and contended that Mastro had a conflict of interest since his firm was politically tied to Christie. Wisniewski and Weinberg, co-chairs of the legislature investigative committee, criticized the report as incomplete and potentially biased since it was prepared by lawyers hired by the Christie administration, and the lawyers did not interview key figures in the scandal. Baroni, Kelly, Samson, Stepien, and Wildstein declined to be interviewed.

Newspaper editorials noted that one of the lawyers on the investigation team was a close friend of Christie. The report was also criticized for "sexism" for its treatment of Christie aide Bridget Kelly.

A Monmouth University Polling Institute poll, released on April 2, 2014, found that 52% of New Jersey residents believed the report was conducted to help Christie's reputation. At about that time, a Quinnipiac University poll found that 56% of New Jersey registered voters viewed it as a "whitewash", while 36% said it was a "legitimate investigation".

In May 2014, a lawyer for Bill Stepien demanded a retraction of the report's contention that Stepien lied to Christie.

On December 16, 2015, a United States District Court Judge issued an opinion criticizing the Gibson firm and its investigation for intentionally failing to preserve notes of interviews conducted by attorneys. Judge Susan Davis Wigenton, presiding in the criminal trial of Kelly and Baroni, wrote: "The taxpayers of the State of New Jersey paid [Gibson Dunn] millions of dollars to conduct a transparent and thorough investigation. What they got instead was opacity and gamesmanship. They deserve better."

== Christie's responses ==
On December 2, 2013, Christie said at a press conference that Democrats were just playing politics by holding hearings into lane closures. "Just because [Rep.] John Wisniewski is obsessed with this, and [Sen.] Loretta Weinberg, it just shows that they really have nothing to do," Christie said. Christie later credited the e-mail documents subpoenaed by the hearings as the first information he had that his staff was involved. When reporter Matt Katz asked, "Governor, did you have anything to do with these lane closures in September outside the GW Bridge? Have you spoken to--" Christie dismissively joked "I worked the cones, actually, Matt. Unbeknownst to everybody I was actually the guy out there. I was in overalls and a hat. You cannot be serious with that question, Matt!"

Christie claimed to not know anything about the Fort Lee lanes, saying: "I didn't know Fort Lee got three dedicated lanes until all this stuff happened, and I think we should review that entire policy. Because I don't know why Fort Lee needs three dedicated lanes to tell you the truth", and "the fact that one town has three lanes dedicated to it? That kind of gets me sauced [upset]." Members of the New Jersey Assembly Transportation Committee said at a November 25, 2013, hearing that the Fort Lee entrance has been used by an even greater number of commuters from the surrounding Bergen County towns. PA officials, including Patrick Foye, confirmed that assessment in their sworn testimony at the committee hearing on December 9, 2013.

Christie has denied involvement, saying that his staff acted without his knowledge regarding to the planning for the lane closures. He said at an April 2014 town hall meeting: "if anybody told me they were going to do this, I would have stopped it". In her trial in 2016, Christie's deputy chief of staff Bridget Anne Kelly stated under oath that Christie had lied to distance himself from the scandal.

On December 12, 2013, The Wall Street Journal reported that Christie was said to have called New York governor Andrew Cuomo to complain about Patrick Foye, the executive director of the Port Authority and a Cuomo appointee, in an apparent attempt to shut down Foye's investigation of the lane closures. On December 13, 2013, Christie denied such a call, saying, "The story is categorically wrong. I did not have that conversation with Governor Cuomo in any way, shape or form." In his January 9, 2014, press conference, he also denied any such conversation. Heather Haddon of The Wall Street Journal still stood by the report on February 19, and Matt Katz said that he had independently confirmed it. During the federal trial of Baroni and Kelly, PA Commissioner Scott Rechler (appointed by Cuomo as vice-chairman under Samson) testified that Cuomo had told him that "Governor Christie mentioned to [Cuomo] that David Samson was once again complaining about Pat Foye interfering, getting involved in politics."

At a press conference on December 13, Christie announced the immediate resignations of Baroni and Wildstein. Nevertheless, Christie said the closure was "absolutely, unequivocally not" political retribution.

Christie added: "I've made it very clear to everybody on my senior staff that if anyone had any knowledge about this, they needed to come forward to me and tell me about it. And they've all assured me that they don't." Christie said: "The chief of staff and chief counsel assured me they feel comfortable that we have all the information we need to have."

At that point during the December 13 press conference, Christina Genovese Renna texted to Pete Sheridan, "Are you listening? He [Christie] just flat out lied about senior staff and [Bill] Stepien not being involved", and "He lied. And if e-mails are found with the subpoena or [campaign] e-mails are uncovered in discovery if it come to that it could be bad." The texts from Renna (an employee of Kelly) to Sheridan (who had worked on the re-election campaign) came to light in court filings by Baroni's attorneys on August 10, 2016, to which Christie responded, "I absolutely dispute it. It's ridiculous. It's nothing new." At the federal trial, Renna walked back her comments, testifying, "I had no knowledge of whether the governor was lying or not. But it seemed to contradict what I had been told."

In a nearly two-hour press conference on January 9, 2014, Christie apologized for the toll lane closures and said that he was "embarrassed and humiliated" by the behavior of his staff. Christie claimed he first learned of his staff's involvement via news media reports on January 8. The governor announced that he had fired Bridget Kelly, calling her "deceitful", claiming her lack of disclosure about her actions and e-mails caused him to mislead the public. Christie admonished his two-time campaign manager Bill Stepien and said he had asked Stepien to withdraw his name from the Republican State Party Chairman race, and to cease his consulting role for the Republican Governors Association. Christie promised that he and his staff would cooperate with any government investigations, including those by the New Jersey Legislature. When asked what he would do if subpoenaed to testify on the matter, Christie said, "I'm not going to speculate on that".

Christie said "I have had no contact with David Wildstein in a long time, a long time, well before the election." Christie was re-elected Governor on November 5, 2013. On September 11, 2013, during the third day of the closures, Christie, Wildstein, Samson and Baroni were photographed together at the site of the World Trade Center during a commemoration of the 12th anniversary of the terrorist attacks.

In the press conference, Christie described his earlier efforts to determine his staff's involvement, saying: "I brought my senior staff together I think about four weeks ago tomorrow. And I put to all of them one simple challenge: If there is any information that you know about the decision to close these lanes in Fort Lee, you have one hour to tell either my chief of staff, Kevin O'Dowd, or my chief counsel, Charlie McKenna."

The governor's office issued a statement on January 31, 2014, that denied the allegations about Christie that were contained in a January 31 letter from Alan Zegas (Wildstein's attorney) to the PA, which had been made public. The letter questioned the accuracy of various statements made by Christie about his client, without providing any specific references, and claimed that there is evidence of Christie being aware of the toll lane closures at the time that they were closed. The governor's office said that Christie stood by his position that he "first learned lanes were closed when it was reported by the press". Christie previously said in his December 13 press conference that this was well after the toll lanes for local traffic were reopened.

During his monthly talk radio broadcast on February 3, Christie said he was cooperating with subpoenas from the state legislative committee and the U.S. Attorney to his governor's office, which began turning over documents to the legislative committee earlier in the day and would continue to do so as the requested items were located.

On April 17, Christie enacted two recommendations of the Mastro report. He eliminated the Office of Legislative and Intergovernmental Affairs, which had been headed by Bridget Kelly. He named Patrick E. Hobbs, dean of Seton Hall University School of Law, Christie's alma mater, as a part-time ombudsman to address complaints about misconduct, enhance ethics training and accountability, and improve electronic communications in the governor's office. Critics noted that Christie's staff and others had used personal e-mails to avoid public scrutiny.

Hobbs retained his Seton Hall post. Hobbs asserted that Christie had given him "full authority and independence" and would leave the job if he felt impeded. The United States Ombudsman Association recommends, however, that ombudsmen be appointed by entities outside of their jurisdiction, preferably by a legislature, to avoid any questions about independence. In 2006, as U.S. Attorney, Christie approved Bristol-Myers Squibb's endowment of an ethics chair at Seton Hall's law school in a controversial prosecution settlement. After a controversy arose over this agreement, Hobbs wrote a letter in 2006 to the editor of The Wall Street Journal praising Christie. Hobbs said he has had a 15-year professional relationship with Christie, and denied the Bristol-Meyers-Squibb arrangement would compromise his role as ombudsman.

On April 24, Christie denied creating a "culture of divisiveness" or that perceptions about his attitude may have led others to plan and allow the lane closures to occur as retaliation. "If in fact I created a culture where people were going after each other, then how did we do all these things together with Republicans and Democrats?" Christie asked during a Brick, New Jersey town hall meeting. The Star-Ledger editorial board answered that Richard Nixon had cut deals with Democrats, but had still abused power; and that despite Christie's early bipartisanship, he has thrown himself into several partisan standoffs; and that his personal style had always been "vindictive and aggressive"; and concluded that Christie "created the culture that inspired" the lane closures.

After the May 2015 indictment of Baroni and Kelly and the Wildstein guilty plea, Christie said that the outcome of the federal investigation was a vindication. He said on Twitter "Today's charges make clear that what I've said from day one is true", and "I had no knowledge or involvement in the planning or execution of this act."

Christie again said he had "no knowledge of" the planning of the event during a June 2023 town hall event on CNN.

== Political impact ==
New Jersey Democratic political leaders lambasted Christie and the lane closings. Sokolich called them "a petty political vendetta", while Barbara Buono contended that a culture of intimidation and retribution engendered by Christie and his staff hampered funding of a challenger even though the state was mostly Democratic. The Democratic National Committee released a video in December 2013 that raised questions if "Christie's political payback" was behind the toll lane closures. It released a satirical video, timed to coincide with the January Assembly hearing, about what questions still needed to be answered. At the beginning of February, it released an online video ad with a Super Bowl 48-inspired, football game theme. It was followed soon after by a video that parodied Facebook's popular "Look Back" videos.

Rudy Giuliani said that if Christie was "not telling the truth, he's ruined". While Giuliani claimed that he was not acting as a surrogate for Christie, many of the media inquiries for interviews with Giuliani had gone to the governor's office and were forwarded to Giuliani by Maria Comella, Christie's Communications Director.

Former Republican New Jersey governor Thomas Kean, a longtime mentor and supporter of Christie, said in January 2014 that he believed Christie when he said he did not know his aides were involved in the lane closures until incriminating e-mails were revealed on January 8. Kean said that there were still unanswered questions about the atmosphere in the governor's office and "whether or not there are more than two or three people involved". In an April 2014 interview with The New Yorker, Kean questioned whether Christie "created an atmosphere in which some of those people thought they were doing his will because they were getting back at people". Kean said he had reconsidered his support of Christie as a potential presidential candidate, and that if Christie was not telling the truth, "then he's finished. As governor, too."

Christie was not named in the May 2015 indictment, and the U.S. Attorney, Paul Fishman, refused to speak on the possible culpability of persons other than the three persons charged. According to The New York Times, the indictment would have a negative political impact on Christie's possible presidential ambitions. Iowa GOP donor Gary Kirke said that Christie's delay to announce a possible presidential campaign until after being cleared of wrongdoing, greatly reduced his chances of winning the 2016 Iowa caucuses. GOP operatives said that the scandal itself had not been an issue leading up to Iowa, nor to New Hampshire, where the first presidential primary would be held.

=== Public opinion ===
==== National polls ====
In January 2014, there was a wide range of opinion about the long-term impact of this scandal on a potential Christie 2016 presidential bid for the 2016 election. By early February, national polling showed a substantial erosion in his political standing and 2016 presidential campaign prospects.

==== New Jersey polls ====
A Rasmussen poll of New Jersey residents, published January 10, 2014, showed that 56% believe Christie should resign "if it is proven that he approved of retaliation against an elected official who refused to support him". Only 29% disagreed. A majority believed it was at least somewhat likely that Christie was aware that the September toll lane closures were retaliation for the mayor of Fort Lee's refusal to support his re-election.

A Rutgers-Eagleton poll, published January 24, 2014, showed that the Fort Lee scandal had hurt his standings among New Jersey residents. Christie's favorability rating, as governor, was shown to be 46%, down 22 points from just before his landslide re-election victory in November 2013, with 43% having an unfavorable view. While the majority of residents still approved his overall performance as governor, his 53% job approval was down 15 points from November. A majority, 56%, said that it was "very unlikely" or "somewhat unlikely" that Christie's top aides acted without his knowledge in the Fort Lee scandal. Only 20% said they fully believed Christie's explanation about this topic, while 42% did not believe his version at all and 33% only partially believed him.

A Monmouth University/Asbury Park Press poll, published February 24, 2014, showed Christie's job approval ratings in New Jersey at 50%, which was down 9% since January and 20% from 12 months prior. Other results showed 61% believed the governor was not completely honest about what he knew about the toll lane closures, and 50% (up from 34% in January) thought Christie was personally involved in the decision to close the toll lanes. A similar poll, released on April 2, showed his approval ratings to be about the same, remaining 14 points lower than December, before the Bridgegate scandal broke. It reported that 62% said that Bridgegate and Hoboken's Sandy relief aid issues hurt his presidential prospects for 2016, up from 51% in January.

== Media coverage ==
The lane closure controversy has received substantial attention from the New York area and national media. The first story in the media about the lane closures, and the first to bring politics into the mix, was reported by The Record's John Cichowski in his Road Warrior column on September 13, 2013, that there was speculation that Fort Lee mayor Mark Sokolich was targeted "either for failing to endorse Governor Christie's election bid or for pushing through a $500 million, 47-story high-rise housing development near the bridge, or for failing to support the Port's last toll hike".

On September 17, 2013, Ted Mann of The Wall Street Journal wrote a story about what could have possibly prompted the Port Authority to close toll lanes to local traffic without public notifications. Citing anonymous sources, he reported that "the decision to close the traffic lanes caused tension" since "the lane closures came as a surprise to some high-ranking officials at the bi-state agency". He said that the toll lanes were reopened to local traffic based on an order from Executive Director Patrick Foye, "who argued that the abrupt shift in traffic patterns caused a threat to public safety and should have been advertised to the public ahead of time".

A subsequent newspaper report by Mann, published on October 1, 2013, was the first to address the contents and quote some of the text from Foye's September 13, 2013, e-mail to PA officials. Foye's e-mail ordered the toll lanes to be reopened while denouncing the closures as an "abusive decision" and pledging to investigate "how PA process was wrongfully subverted and the public interest damaged" without Foye's knowledge. The e-mail said that there were potential violations of state and federal laws. PA insiders disputed that there was a traffic study. All of this reinforced the reported rumors that the toll lanes might have been closed by political surrogates of Christie, a Republican, as an alleged act of political retribution against Sokolich, a Democrat, for not endorsing Christie in his 2013 re-election campaign. The Record, The Wall Street Journal, and other news media continued to investigate the matter in comprehensive reporting over the next few months, using sources and requests for public records.

The New York Times covered the lane closure story on December 8, 2013.

The scandal broke in full on January 8, 2014, with an online story by Shawn Boburg of The Record that Christie's deputy chief of staff Bridget Kelly was involved in the planning of the toll lane closures. That revelation catapulted the story into a national political event. The Record continued with details of the dialogues in the troves of e-mails and texts supplied to the New Jersey Assembly Transportation Committee by David Wildstein. The Record described "vindictive lane closures" that were intended to cause massive traffic jams in Fort Lee. Related news with quotes from the e-mails and texts were subsequently published the same day in other news media. During his January 9, 2014, press conference about the scandal, Governor Christie cited The Record as breaking the pivotal story on January 8.

MSNBC gave substantial coverage to the Bridgegate scandal, and the network's ratings reached their highest point since the 2013 Boston Marathon bombings when it covered Chris Christie's apologetic press conference on January 9, 2014. MSNBC's intensive coverage was criticized by Christie, who was formerly close to MSNBC, calling it a "partisan network" that is "almost gleeful in their efforts attacking" him. In response to Christie's criticisms of the intensive coverage by MSNBC and other media, Steve Kornacki noted in 2015 that coverage by the media primarily focused on the causes and effects of the bridge toll lane closures and the involvement of members of Christie's administration and his Port Authority appointees, David Wildstein and Bill Baroni, rather than Christie himself. Observing that Christie had ridiculed the media in 2013 for trying to implicate Wildstein and Baroni, Kornacki noted that by 2015, Wildstein had pleaded guilty to federal charges and Baroni was facing a federal indictment in connection with the scandal.

The usage of "Serbian" as a slur received particular attention and condemnation within the Serbian diaspora. Website inSerbia published an open letter from a Serbian-American couple condemning Wildstein and Baroni's comments and calling for the governor to apologize to the Serbian-American community. Slavka Drašković of the Serbian government's Office for Cooperation with the Diaspora and Serbs in the Region also condemned their remarks, stating: "We cannot allow for every name that ends in '-ić' to be identified with the bad and abusive, and in this case, to become the victim of prejudice.". The comments also caught the attention of Serbian and Croatian media. Newspapers in Serbia emphasized the derogatory comments in their headlines, while those in Croatia emphasized Sokolich's heritage. Laura Silber, co-author of Yugoslavia: Death of a Nation, expressed her pleasure at the civility of Balkan commentary over the incident: "The comments on the articles were surprisingly measured. The people who brought you the term 'ethnic cleansing', they were saying it's impolite to comment on someone's nationality and use it as an insult."

In a decision on July 2, 2014, Superior Court Judge P. J. Innes ruled in favor of the North Jersey Media Group, publisher of the newspaper The Record, that the state must partially comply with open records request and turn over some information it had previously refused to release regarding current and former state employees' written requests for the state to appoint them attorneys or pay their legal fees resulting from parallel criminal and legislative investigations into the lane closures, though not the names of the employees. The state must pay the media group's legal fees. The media group plans to appeal, to gain fuller disclosure of the documents.

== See also ==
- List of people involved in the Fort Lee lane closure scandal
- Controversies and investigations in the Governorship of Chris Christie
- Crime in New Jersey
- List of scandals with "-gate" suffix
- Politics of New Jersey
