= Ralph J. Marra Jr. =

American lawyer (born 1953)

United States Attorney for the District of New Jersey Acting
- In office December 1, 2008 – October 14, 2009
- President: George W. Bush; Barack Obama
- Preceded by: Chris Christie
- Succeeded by: Paul J. Fishman

Personal details
- Born: 1953 (age 72–73) Hoboken, New Jersey
- Education: Rutgers University; New York University School of Law

Ralph Joseph Marra Jr. (born 1953) is an American lawyer who served as the Acting United States Attorney for the District of New Jersey. He held this position from the resignation of Chris Christie in December 2008 until the appointment of Paul J. Fishman in October 2009. In January 2010, after Christie became Governor of New Jersey, Marra was appointed to a top legal position in the New Jersey Sports and Exposition Authority. After serving about a decade, he became senior counsel at Calcagni & Kanefsky, LLP in Newark, New Jersey.

== Early life ==
Marra's father was an Italian immigrant who settled in Hoboken, New Jersey in 1930. The family moved to Totowa, New Jersey, and Marra attended Passaic Valley Regional High School, which serviced Little Falls, Totowa, and West Paterson (now Woodland Park).

Marra received a B.A. degree from Rutgers University and a J.D. degree from New York University School of Law. He was admitted to the New Jersey bar in 1978.

== U.S. Attorney's office ==
In 1985, Marra joined the office of the United States Attorney for the District of New Jersey as an assistant U.S. Attorney. He worked in the Special Prosecutions Division, focusing on the investigation and prosecution of public corruption. From 1997 to 2002 he served as senior litigation counsel. Marra prosecuted former Newark Mayor Kenneth A. Gibson and two associates on federal bribery charges. Gibson pleaded guilty to tax fraud in 2002.

In 2002, United States Attorney Christopher J. Christie named Marra as his first assistant. He served as lead attorney in the prosecution of State Senator Wayne R. Bryant on corruption charges. Bryant was convicted on all counts in November 2008.

Marra continued as first assistant U.S. Attorney until December 1, 2008, when Christie resigned to pursue the Republican nomination for Governor of New Jersey. Marra became Acting U.S. Attorney upon Christie's resignation, serving until a permanent replacement was selected by President Barack Obama. On June 4, 2009, Obama nominated ex-federal prosecutor Paul J. Fishman to the position. Fishman was sworn into office on October 14, 2009.

=== Operation Bid Rig ===
On July 23, 2009, Marra announced the arrests of 44 people, including several high-profile New Jersey elected officials, as part of Operation Bid Rig, a major sting operation stemming from a two-year investigation into money laundering and political corruption. On August 18, the Associated Press reported that Marra was facing an internal Justice Department investigation for his public comments at the time of the arrests, in order to determine if his comments could be construed as an implicit endorsement of Christie's gubernatorial candidacy.

== Christie administration ==
In November 2009, Internet news sources reported that Chris Christie planned to appoint Marra as Attorney General of New Jersey following his inauguration in January 2010. Instead, on December 15, 2009, Christie announced his intention to nominate Essex County Prosecutor Paula Dow as Attorney General.

On February 18, 2010, Marra was appointed to the position of senior vice president for legal and governmental affairs for the New Jersey Sports and Exposition Authority.

Marra resides in Cranford, New Jersey with his wife Sharon and is a registered Democrat.
