= Philip Kwon =

American lawyer

Philip Kwon is an American attorney who served as deputy counsel for the Port Authority of New York and New Jersey. In 2012, Governor of New Jersey Chris Christie nominated him to the Supreme Court of New Jersey to succeed John E. Wallace Jr., but Kwon's nomination was blocked in the Senate Judiciary Committee by a vote of 7-6. He was the first New Jersey Supreme Court nominee in modern history to be rejected by the Senate and the first Asian American nominated to the New Jersey Supreme Court.

== Background, education, early career and political affiliation ==
Kwon was born in South Korea and emigrated to the United States in 1973.

Kwon graduated from the Bronx High School of Science. Kwon received his undergraduate degree from Georgetown University in 1989 and his J.D. from Rutgers School of Law–Newark in 1994.

In September 1999, Kwon joined the United States Attorney’s Office for the District of New Jersey as an Assistant United States Attorney in the Criminal Division, focusing on crimes involving drugs, gangs, counterfeiting, white-collar fraud, and immigration fraud. Kwon worked in the New Jersey Attorney General's office. Before that, he was an Assistant U.S. Attorney for New Jersey, where he later worked under Chris Christie. Kwon also worked in the law office of LeBoeuf, Lamb, Greene & MacRae from 1994 to 1997.

Prior to moving to New Jersey in April 2011, Kwon lived in New York, where he was a registered Republican. He resides and is registered to vote in Closter without a Democratic or Republican party affiliation.

== Supreme Court nomination and rejection ==
Kwon was nominated for the New Jersey Supreme Court by Governor Chris Christie in January 2012 to succeed John Wallace. On March 22, 2012, the New Jersey Senate Judiciary Committee voted 7-6 not to approve Kwon's nomination. Kwon's was the first gubernatorial nominee for the Supreme Court in modern times to fail to be approved. Kwon would have been the first Asian-American to serve on the court.

== Port Authority of New York and New Jersey ==
Kwon was appointed to the Port Authority of New York and New Jersey (PANYNJ) in July 2012.

In February 2014, Kwon was subpoenaed to testify before the New Jersey Legislature special committee investigating the Fort Lee George Washington Bridge lane closures which occurred in September 2013. Kwon reportedly spent four or five days preparing Bill Baroni, the PANYNJ deputy executive director, for his November 2013 appearance before the NJ Assembly Transportation Committee and who at that time claimed that the lane closures were part of a legitimate traffic study. In May 2014 Kwon was subpoenaed by the grand jury New Jersey Attorney General's office regarding the matter. In June 2014 the NJ Legislative committee issued another subpoena to Kwon. At the federal trial in 2016, Kwon was represented by Geoffrey Berman, who would later be interviewed by President Trump for the role of U.S. Attorney, Southern District of New York.

== See also ==
- Governorship of Chris Christie
- List of people involved in the Fort Lee lane closure scandal
