= Kevin O'Dowd =

New Jersey public servant and political figure

Kevin O'Dowd is a New Jersey public servant and political figure who served as Chief of Staff to the Governor of New Jersey Chris Christie. He was considered, but not formally nominated, for the position of Attorney General of the State of New Jersey.

== Biography ==
O'Dowd was born in Morristown, New Jersey. He graduated from the Catholic University of America and St. John's University law school. O'Dowd was hired by then-US Attorney Chris Christie and served as a federal prosecutor. He worked in the US Attorney's Office Securities and Health Care Fraud Unit. O'Dowd spent two years employed as Chief of Staff to the Governor of New Jersey. O'Dowd lives in New Brunswick.

On December 3, 2013, O'Dowd was nominated to be the next Attorney General of New Jersey. O'Dowd's confirmation hearing was scheduled for January 14, 2014, but was postponed. O'Dowd is one of several New Jersey state employees within the governor's office subpoenaed by the New Jersey Legislature panel investigating the Fort Lee lane closure scandal. On June 9, 2014, he opened his testimony to the panel with a statement that he had "no prior knowledge of" and "played no role in" the lane closings. New Jersey State Senate Democrats said they would consider taking up his nomination as attorney general if his testimony did not disclose any major revelations regarding the investigation.

It was announced in November 2014 that O'Dowd would step down as Chief of Staff and work at Cooper University Hospital in Camden.

== Personal life ==
He is married to the state's Commissioner of New Jersey Department of Health and Senior Services Mary E. O’Dowd.

== See also ==
- Governorship of Chris Christie
- List of people involved in the Fort Lee lane closure scandal
