= Michael Drewniak =

Michael Drewniak was press secretary to the former Governor of New Jersey, Chris Christie. He was appointed by Governor Christie to New Jersey Transit and started on April 1, 2015, at a newly created position. In May 2016, he was named acting director of the agency.

== Career ==
Drewniak spent 12 years as a reporter for The Star-Ledger.

In 1998, Drewniak became the principal public information officer for the US Attorney's Office, where he was a spokesman for then-US Attorney Faith Hochberg, who is now a federal District Court Judge in Newark. He was also a colleague and protege of Stuart J. Rabner, then the First Assistant U.S. Attorney in the District of New Jersey who later went to work for the Gubernatorial administration of Governor Jon Corzine. Rabner is now Chief Justice of the New Jersey Supreme Court. Drewniak, then a registered Democrat, served subsequently for two other U.S. Attorney's, including Christopher Christie, beginning in 2002. Drewniak supported Christie's run for governor, and upon Christie's election, Drewniak became press secretary to the governor.

Drewniak is one of several New Jersey state employees within the governor's office who was subpoenaed by the New Jersey Legislature panel investigating the Fort Lee lane closure scandal. Drewniak was also subpoenaed by the United States Attorney's Office, District of New Jersey, and appeared as a fact witness before a federal grand jury. He has never been charged with a crime by law enforcement agencies.

== See also ==
- Governorship of Chris Christie
- List of people involved in the Fort Lee lane closure scandal
