= Michael DuHaime =

Republican strategist and public affairs executive

Political Director of the Republican National Committee
- In office January 19, 2005 – January 19, 2007
- Leader: Ken Mehlman
- Preceded by: Blaise Hazelwood
- Succeeded by: Rich Beeson

Personal details
- Born: 1974 (age 51–52) Bloomingdale, New Jersey, US
- Party: Republican
- Education: Rutgers University (BA)

Mike Andrew DuHaime (born May 1974), is a political campaign strategist, public affairs executive, and businessman. A member of the Republican Party, DuHaime served as the Political Director of the Republican National Committee between 2005 and 2007 and was the chief strategist for the successful campaign of Chris Christie for governor of New Jersey, defeating Democratic incumbent Jon Corzine. DuHaime is also a managing director at Mercury Public Affairs, LLC, a national public affairs firm. He served as one of ten members of Gov. Christie's transition team and was the chairman of the authorities subcommittee.

DuHaime advised the 2016 Chris Christie presidential campaign.

== Early life ==
DuHaime grew up in Bloomingdale, New Jersey and graduated from nearby DePaul Catholic High School. His mother, Anne DuHaime, served as the mayor of Bloomingdale. His father, Richard DuHaime, was a four-term Passaic County Freeholder and unsuccessfully ran for the U.S. Senate in 1996. He finished second in a three-way Republican primary, capturing only 19% of the vote and losing to Rep. Richard Zimmer. His sister, Debbie DuHaime, is the morning traffic reporter for WABC-AM and WEPN-AM radio in New York City.

DuHaime graduated from Rutgers University in 1995 with a Bachelor's Degree in Journalism and Political Science. He was also a member of the Rutgers ice hockey team where he served as its captain during his junior and senior years. The team played in the MCHC and did compete at the NCAA level.

== Early career ==
DuHaime started in politics as a volunteer on his father's campaigns for Freeholder and U.S. Senate and worked as an intern in the New Jersey State Senate Majority office in Trenton.

In 1997, he became the Campaign Manager for Anthony Bucco, a Republican State Assemblyman from Morris County who was challenging an incumbent Democratic State Senator in New Jersey's 25th Legislative District. Bucco defeated Peter Mancuso, a former Mayor of Morris Township and a former New Jersey Republican State Committee Finance Chairman, in the Republican primary by a 56%-44% margin. Bucco defeated incumbent State Sen. Gordon MacInnes in the General Election by a 55%-44% margin. Bucco won despite being heavily outspent in both races, and was the only Republican to defeat an incumbent Democratic State Senator in New Jersey from 1991 to 2007.

As the Vice-President of Political Communications in 1998 for Campbell & Pusateri, a national Republican consulting firm in Alexandria, Virginia, DuHaime designed paid media and mail strategies for races throughout the country, the most noteworthy of which was the open seat congressional race in Pennsylvania's 10th District, where Democrats outnumbered Republicans. DuHaime's client, the businessman Don Sherwood, assembled "a grassroots organization of 1,800 volunteers and propounding an agenda that combined small business to cut taxes" (Almanac of American Politics 2000) and won an eight-candidate field in the Republican primary with 43% of the vote. Scranton Mayor Jim Connors finished second with 23%. In the General Election, Sherwood defeated Patrick Casey, the son of popular former Governor Robert Casey, by 515 votes, 49%-48%.

Recognized for his ability and success Campaigns & Elections Magazine named DuHaime a "Rising Star in American Politics" at the age of 24 in 1998, and he has taught seminars on political communication and grassroots campaigning to candidates and operatives in New Jersey and Washington. DuHaime has also spoken on grassroots politics at Harvard and Rutgers.

In 1999, DuHaime returned to New Jersey to work in the District Office of Rep. Bob Franks, a former Republican State Chairman who was in his fourth term in the U.S. House. He also served as Executive Director of New Jersey's New Century, a political action committee chaired by Congressman Franks.

== 2000 campaign ==
Democratic U.S. Senator Frank R. Lautenberg retired after three terms, and Republican Governor Christine Todd Whitman was running to succeed him. But in September 1999, Whitman unexpectedly dropped out of the race, and four candidates, including Bob Franks, sought the Republican Senate nomination.

DuHaime became Franks' Deputy Campaign Manager. Franks won the Republican nomination after an intensive grassroots campaign directed by DuHaime, that included several stunning upsets in pre-primary conventions for the endorsements of county organizations. In the general election, Franks lost narrowly to Democrat Jon Corzine, who spent more than $70 million to win a U.S. Senate seat. A Quinnipiac University Polling Institute poll released the day before the 2000 election showed Franks leading Corzine, 45%-43%.

== Political consultant ==
From 2001 to 2003, DuHaime owned the Hoboken, New Jersey, political consulting firm DuHaime Communications, Inc. His clients included Thomas H. Kean, Jr., who won election to his first public office in 2001 as a candidate for the New Jersey General Assembly in a Special Election. DuHaime was also the consultant for Kean's first State Senate race two years later. Another client was Bill Baroni, who unseated an incumbent Democratic Assemblyman in 2003.

DuHaime served as Executive Director of the New Jersey Republican State Committee in 2002. The state party utilized innovative GOTV tactics that resulted in increased turnout in GOP strongholds that, for the first time in years, outpaced the turnout in Democratic areas. Doug Forrester, the Republican candidate for United States Senate that year, was soundly defeated by former United States Senator Frank Lautenberg.

DuHaime served as Political Director of the Republican National Committee from January 2005 to December 2006, where he became known for his ability to organize on the grassroots level effectively. He is a protégé of Republican National Chairman Ken Mehlman and Terry Nelson.

As a Regional Political Director for Bush-Cheney presidential campaign in 2004, DuHaime helped develop the national "get out the vote" and Election Day efforts and directed the day-to-day campaign operations in 11 northeastern states, which yielded millions more votes for the President in the region and kept John Kerry tied up in his Northeastern base.

DuHaime said of Donald Trump's second impeachment, “The longer Donald Trump stays central to the news, the better it is for Biden,” he said. “The constant reminder of Trump’s worst actions makes Biden look great by comparison, simply by acting sane.”

== 2008 presidential election ==
DuHaime was initially serving as campaign manager for Rudy Giuliani's presidential campaign. However, when Arizona Senator John McCain secured the Republican nomination, DuHaime became the senior advisor for Political Operations at the Republican National Committee. As of July 7, DuHaime was hired as political director for Sen. John McCain's unsuccessful presidential bid.

He managed Rudy Giuliani's campaign for the 2008 Republican presidential nomination. He has served as Political Director of the Republican National Committee, Regional Political Director of President Bush's 2004 re-election campaign, and Executive Director of the New Jersey Republican State Committee.

Before working on the Bush campaign, DuHaime worked for Republicans at the local, state, and federal levels.

== 2009 New Jersey gubernatorial election ==
DuHaime was the lead consultant for Republican Chris Christie, who was elected Governor of New Jersey in 2009. Christie defeated incumbent Governor Jon S. Corzine by nearly 100,000 votes. Christie named DuHaime as one of ten members of his transition team. DuHaime headed the transition panel for the state's independent authorities, which includes the Port Authority of New York and New Jersey, and the New Jersey Sports and Exposition Authority.

DuHaime was one of ten members of Gov.-elect Chris Christie's Transition Team and chaired the Authorities Subcommittee, which deals with the state's independent authorities and agencies.

== Personal life ==
DuHaime has been a resident of Westfield, New Jersey.

== See also ==
- List of people involved in the Fort Lee lane closure scandal
