= Paul J. Fishman =

American lawyer (born 1957)

Paul Fishman
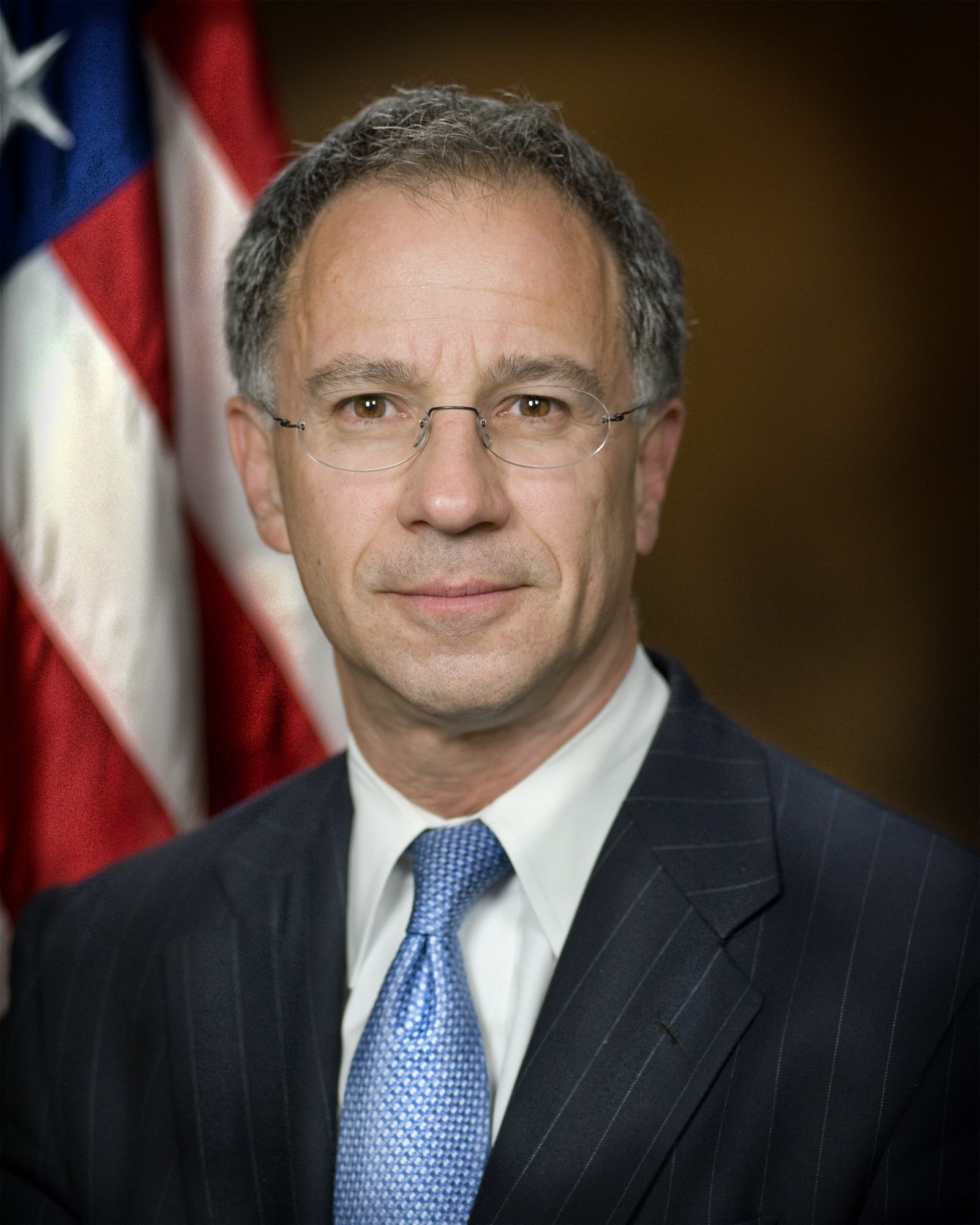
- Official portrait, 2010

United States Attorney for the District of New Jersey
- In office October 14, 2009 – March 10, 2017
- President: Barack Obama; Donald Trump
- Preceded by: Chris Christie
- Succeeded by: Craig Carpenito

Personal details
- Born: February 26, 1957 (age 69) New York City, New York, U.S.
- Party: Democratic
- Education: Princeton University (BA); Harvard University (JD)

Paul J. Fishman (born February 26, 1957) is an American attorney and former United States Attorney for the District of New Jersey from 2009 to 2017.

== Early life and education ==
Fishman was born on February 26, 1957, in New York City to a Jewish family. He grew up in River Edge, Bergen County, New Jersey, and attended River Dell Regional High School. He graduated from Princeton University magna cum laude.

After receiving his J.D. from Harvard Law School in 1982, he served as law clerk to Edward R. Becker, a judge on the Court of Appeals for the Third Circuit, from 1982 to 1983.

== Career ==
In 1983, Fishman was admitted to the bar in the state of New Jersey and the United States District Court for the District of New Jersey. That same year, he joined the office of the United States Attorney for the District of New Jersey as an Assistant U.S. Attorney, serving in that position until 1987. He served as Deputy Chief of the Criminal Division from 1987 to 1989 and as Chief of the Criminal Division from 1989 to 1991. He then served as First Assistant U.S. Attorney from 1991 to 1994 under Michael Chertoff.

Fishman joined the United States Department of Justice under Janet Reno in 1994 as counsel to the deputy attorney general. He was named associate deputy attorney general in 1995, serving until 1997.

In 1997, he became a partner at Friedman Kaplan Seiler & Adelman. His clients included Carla Katz, the former president of the Communications Workers of America who dated New Jersey Governor Jon Corzine, and Encap Golf Holdings, a company that was contracted to build golf courses and homes on remediated landfills in the New Jersey Meadowlands. Both of these clients were targets of investigations by the U.S. Attorney's Office.

On June 4, 2009, Fishman was nominated by President Barack Obama to be U.S. Attorney for the District of New Jersey. He was sworn into office on October 14, 2009, along with his First Assistant U.S. Attorney, Gil Childers. Fishman succeeded Acting U.S. Attorney Ralph J. Marra, who had served after the resignation of Chris Christie in December 2008 to run for Governor of New Jersey. After he was fired by incoming Attorney General Jeff Sessions in 2017, he joined the faculty of Seton Hall Law School as a Distinguished Visiting Fellow.

Fishman is a registered Democrat and resides in Montclair. He is married with two children. He is also a board member of the Yogi Berra Museum and Learning Center in Little Falls.

=== Divorce kidnapping case ===
Fishman represented the U.S. government in its case against members of the New York divorce coercion gang.

=== Fort Lee lane closure scandal ===
Fishman led the investigation involving the Fort Lee lane closure scandal. The resulting indictment led to the guilty plea of David Weinstein as well as the trial of Bridget Ann Kelly and Bill Baroni. After a month long trial, Kelly and Baroni were both convicted of nine counts. On May 7, 2020, the Supreme Court unanimously overturned the convictions of Kelly and Baroni.

== See also ==
- 2017 dismissal of U.S. attorneys
- List of Jewish American jurists

Legal offices
Preceded by Chris Christie	United States Attorney for the District of New Jersey; 2009–2017	Succeeded by Craig Carpenito
