= Pat Foye =

American lawyer and government official

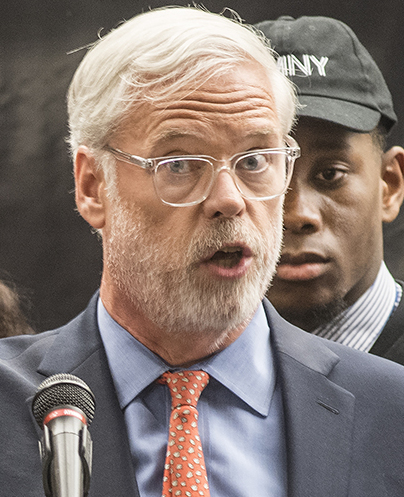

14th Chairman and CEO of the Metropolitan Transportation Authority
- In office April 1, 2019 – July 29, 2021
- Governor: Andrew Cuomo
- Preceded by: Joe Lhota; Fernando Ferrer (acting)
- Succeeded by: Janno Lieber

President of the Metropolitan Transportation Authority
- In office August 3, 2017 – April 1, 2019
- Appointed by: Andrew Cuomo
- Succeeded by: Position abolished

Executive Director of the Port Authority of New York and New Jersey
- In office November 1, 2011 – August 13, 2017
- Appointed by: Andrew Cuomo
- Preceded by: Christopher O. Ward
- Succeeded by: Rick Cotton

Personal details
- Born: Patrick Joseph Foye; January 31, 1957 (age 69)
- Party: Independent
- Education: Fordham University (BA, JD)
- Occupation: Lawyer

Patrick Joseph Foye (born January 31, 1957) is an American lawyer who was chairman and CEO of the New York Metropolitan Transportation Authority (MTA). Prior to this role, he was president of the MTA and executive director of the Port Authority of New York and New Jersey.

== Life and career ==
Foye graduated cum laude from Fordham University and attended Fordham Law School, where he was associate editor for the Fordham Law Review. Foye also received an honorary doctorate of humane letters from Fordham University on May 21, 2022. As a lawyer, he worked with Skadden Arps. He was appointed by Governor Eliot Spitzer to be chairman of New York's Empire State Development Corporation and was a board member of the Metropolitan Transportation Authority. Foye was deputy county executive for economic development under Nassau County Executive Ed Mangano.

In October 2011, Governor Andrew Cuomo appointed Foye to the post of executive director of the Port Authority. Cuomo ousted Christopher O. Ward who was a David Paterson appointee. In November 2015, Foye announced he would leave the position in March 2016. In March 2016, Foye announced he would delay his departure from the position until June 2016, as no replacement had yet been named. Foye later decided to remain in his post as executive director. On August 14, 2017, Foye was succeeded by Rick Cotton as executive director of the Port Authority of New York and New Jersey.

In 2017, Foye became president of the Metropolitan Transportation Authority (MTA). On April 1, 2019, Foye was appointed chairman and CEO of the MTA by Governor Cuomo with approval from the New York State Senate. In late July 2021, Pat Foye stepped down at the behest of Governor Cuomo to be replaced by Janno Lieber. In September 2021, after Andrew Cuomo stepped down, Foye announced he would not become the CEO of Empire State Development, and allow Kathy Hochul to nominate her own choice.

Since leaving government, Foye has advocated on behalf of ASTM in support of their proposal for a new 8th Avenue entrance to Pennsylvania Station (New York City).

== Fort Lee lane closure scandal ==
Foye played a key role in ending an allegedly politically motivated traffic blockage that caused gridlock in Fort Lee, New Jersey for four days in 2013. On Monday, September 9 two of three toll lanes leading to the George Washington Bridge from Fort Lee local streets were closed during morning rush hour. Local officials, emergency services, and the public were not notified of the lane closures, which Fort Lee declared a threat to public safety. The resulting back-ups on local streets finally ended on Friday morning, September 13 when Foye ordered the two lanes reopened immediately. He said that the "hasty and ill-informed decision" to close lanes could have endangered lives and violated federal and state laws.

Preceded by Christopher O. Ward	Executive Director of the Port Authority of New York and New Jersey; May 2011 – 2017	Succeeded by Rick Cotton

Political offices
Preceded by Fernando Ferrer	Chairman and CEO of the MTA; 2019–2021	Succeeded by Janno Lieber
