= 2024 United States Senate election in New Jersey =

- November 5, 2024
- Turnout: 64.67% ▲8.67pp
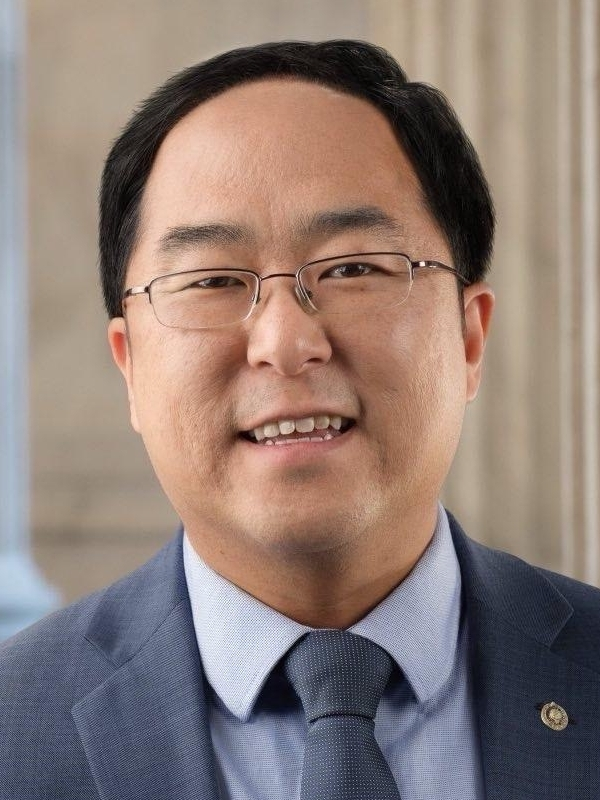

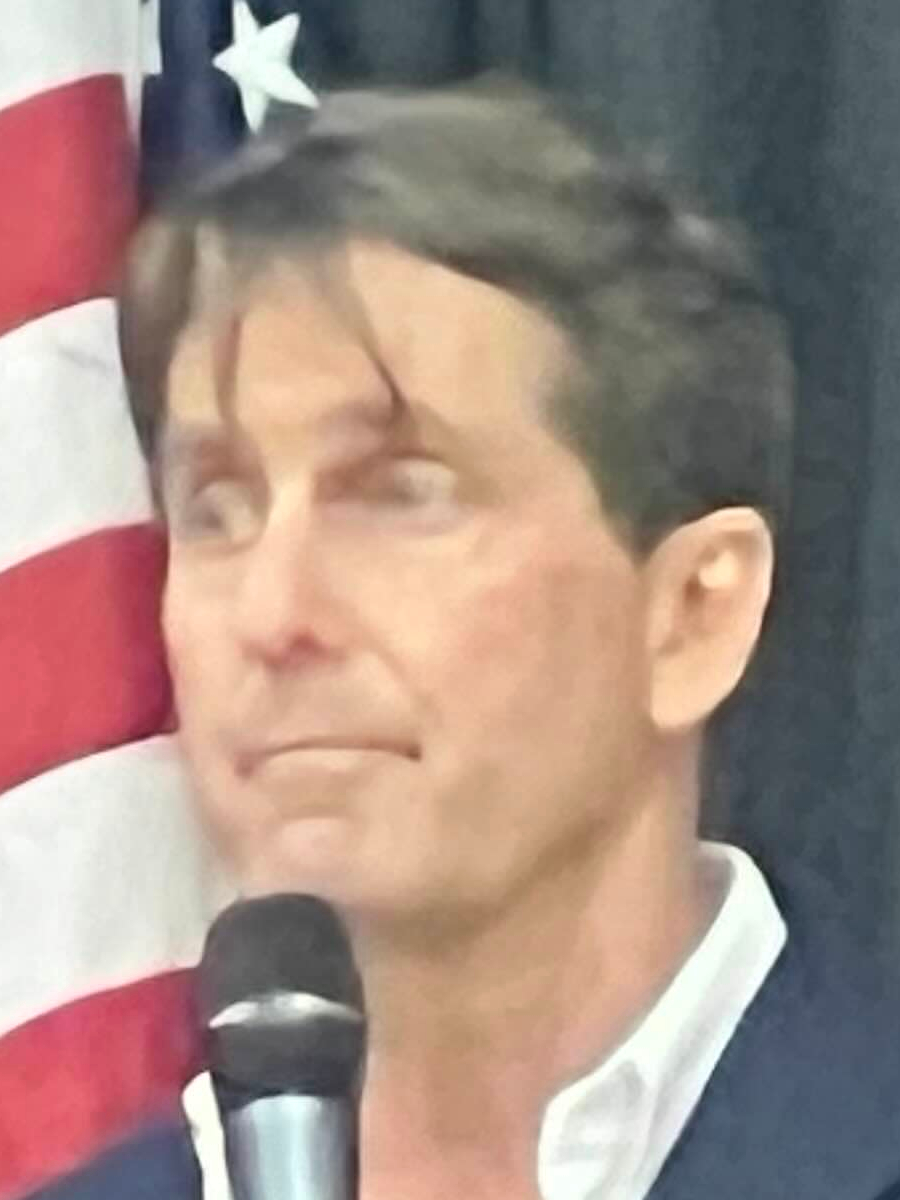
Nominee	Andy Kim	Curtis Bashaw
Party	Democratic	Republican
Popular vote	2,161,491	1,773,589
Percentage	53.61%	43.99%
- Kim: 40–50% 50–60% 60–70% 70–80% 80–90% 90%+ Bashaw: 40–50% 50–60% 60–70% 70–80% 80–90% 80–90% 90%+ Tie: 40–50% 50%
U.S. senator before election
George Helmy (Note: In August 2024, Helmy was appointed by Governor Phil Murphy to fill the vacancy caused by the resignation of Senator Bob Menendez.)
Democratic
Elected U.S. senator
Andy Kim
Democratic

The 2024 United States Senate election in New Jersey was held on November 5, 2024, to elect a member of the United States Senate to represent the state of New Jersey. Democratic U.S. representative Andy Kim won his first term in office, defeating Republican real estate developer Curtis Bashaw. He succeeded Democrat George Helmy, who served as an interim appointee for the remainder of Bob Menendez's third term. Kim assumed office on December 8, 2024, after his election was certified, in order to give an advantage in seniority.

Menendez, who had represented New Jersey in the Senate since 2006, began to face an uncertain political future after he was indicted for federal corruption charges in 2023, his second such indictment. Amid questions over whether Menendez would seek a fourth term, a contentious Democratic primary took place between Kim and First Lady of New Jersey Tammy Murphy that was marked by allegations of nepotism and party favoritism towards Murphy. In March, Menendez announced he would not seek the Democratic nomination and Murphy withdrew from the race, leaving Kim as the only major Democratic candidate. Menendez filed to run as an independent ahead of the June primaries, but after being convicted of federal corruption the following month, he ended his candidacy and resigned from the Senate.

In the June 4 primary, Kim won the Democratic nomination with 75% of the vote. Bashaw won the Republican nomination with 45% of the vote, defeating Mendham Borough Mayor Christine Serrano Glassner, who was endorsed by then former president Donald Trump and his allies. After the general election, Kim became the first Korean American senator, the first Asian American to represent New Jersey in the Senate, and the first person from South Jersey to represent the state in the Senate since 1955. Kim flipped Gloucester County and narrowly held Passaic County, both of which voted for Trump in the concurrent presidential race. Cumberland County voted Republican in a Senate election for the first time since 1972, and the first time in this seat since 1952.

This was the closest Senate election in the state since 2006.

== Democratic primary ==
=== Background ===
In 2023, incumbent three-term Democrat Bob Menendez was indicted on federal corruption charges that he aided and provided sensitive information to the Egyptian government. Menendez was previously indicted on federal corruption charges in 2015 for bribery, fraud, and making false statements; the charges were dropped in 2018 after the jury was unable to reach a verdict and he was re-elected to a third term the same year. Amid calls from several prominent Democrats to resign, Menendez did not seek the Democratic nomination, but filed to run for re-election as an independent. Menendez was found guilty of federal corruption in July.

Following Menendez's 2023 indictment, two prominent Democrats announced their Senate candidacy: U.S. Representative Andy Kim and First Lady of New Jersey Tammy Murphy. The primary between Murphy and Kim was seen as competitive, as even though Kim led comfortably in polls, Murphy had received significant party support and the county line endorsements in many heavily populated counties along with endorsements from many county party chairs and from New Jersey Democratic Party chair LeRoy J. Jones Jr. Kim, however, had received support from many national and progressive Democrats such as Pennsylvania Senator John Fetterman, the College Democrats of America, and the College Democrats of New Jersey. Murphy announced her withdrawal from the race on March 24, citing poor polling.

=== Allegations of nepotism ===
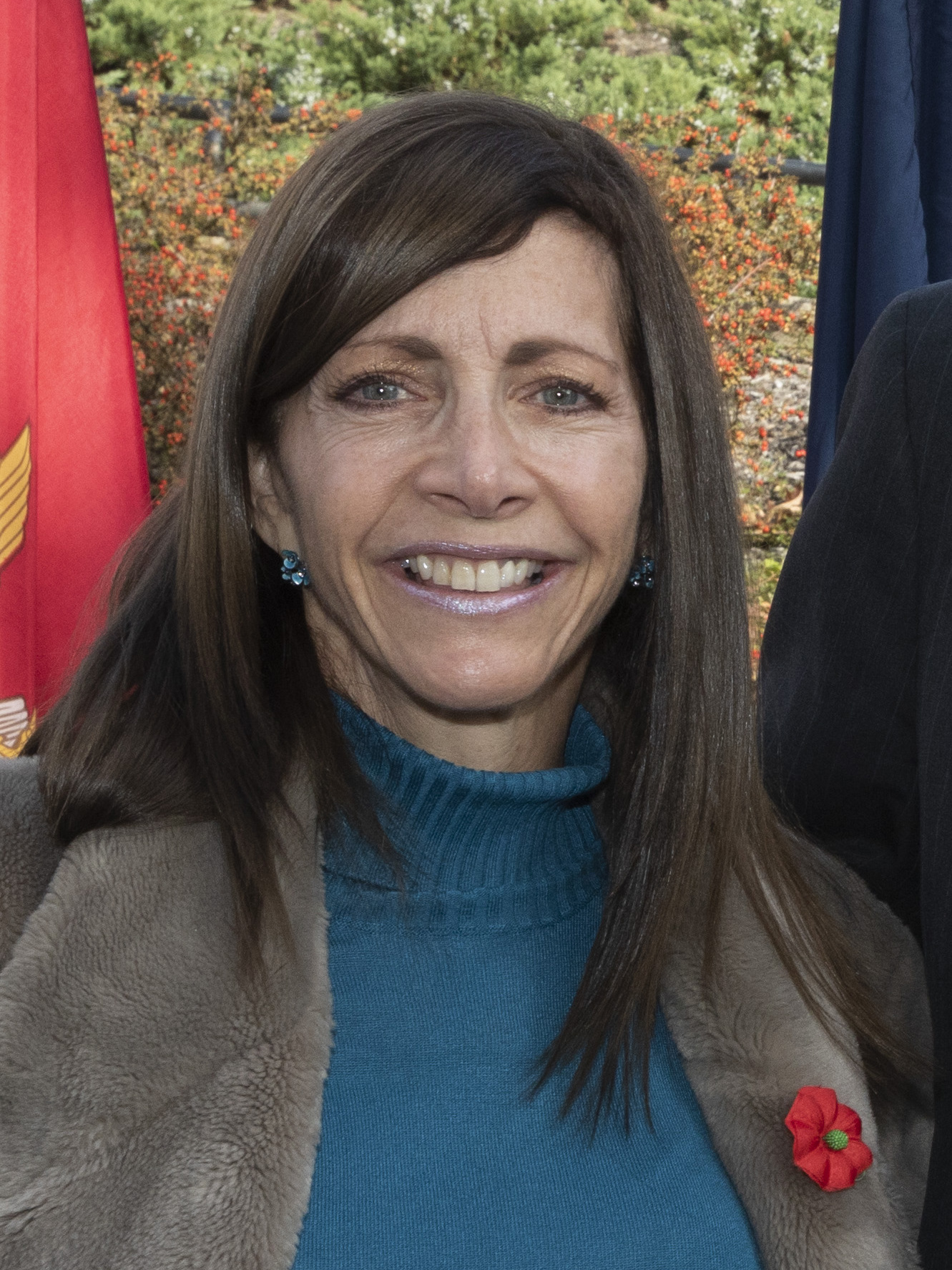
Tammy Murphy in 2021

Murphy's candidacy had given rise to allegations of cronyism and nepotism due to her being the wife of incumbent Governor Phil Murphy. Critics argued that since her husband is the head of the New Jersey Democratic Party, it would have ensured her victory. These accusations grew after she entered into the race as the chairs of the Hudson, Camden, Bergen, Somerset, Essex, (Note: The County Chair of the Essex County Democratic Committee, LeRoy J. Jones Jr., is also the Chair of the state party.) and Middlesex county Democratic organizations endorsed Murphy; these represent 40% of Democratic voters in New Jersey. Candidates in New Jersey who receive the endorsement of county chairs are often placed in a premier position of the primary election ballot, bracketed with other endorsed candidates, called the "party" or "county line." Candidates who are "on the line" typically win the June primary.

Murphy had responded to questions about her qualification for office due to not having been elected to office before and her previously being a registered Republican as being sexist, saying: "I'm not sure a male would be asked this question." At a candidate forum at the County College of Morris in January 2024, Murphy was asked to address the "elephant in the room" about her perceived advantage as the wife of Governor Phil Murphy. She replied that she was "honored and thrilled" to receive endorsements from New Jersey Democrats, who endorsed her "not because my husband asked them, but because I asked them. They know me." She promised to "earn every vote" and to listen to "not only the people who are with me, but both sides, and not just seeing through one lens". A number of members of Congress who had endorsed her also said they endorsed her over Kim because she asked, and because of her work for women's health, children, and seniors.

=== Endorsement controversies ===
On December 24, 2023, Mountainside Democratic Municipal Chair and former NOW-NJ President Anjali Mehrotra announced that she would support Kim. However, she later retracted this statement, deciding to back Murphy's campaign and criticize Kim's candidacy.

On January 10, 2024, the College Democrats of New Jersey (CDNJ) in conjunction with the College Democrats of America (CDA) endorsed Kim. Four days later, it was revealed that, before the CDNJ announced their endorsement of Kim, they received a call from a college student who serves as the Youth Coordinator for the state party. In the call, the staffer asked the CDNJ to cancel the group's endorsement of Kim, expressing concerns over CDNJ members' future job prospects and funding.

The staffer would later say that while Murphy's campaign had not asked her to pressure the group on their behalf, but had wanted "to do something to prevent the endorsement." Murphy's campaign responded, saying the staffer's comments were "totally and completely inappropriate, and they in no way represent this campaign or what we stand for," and adding that the staffer had no connection to Murphy's campaign. The Murphy campaign also said that all of the students involved in this "unfortunate situation" should be afforded the "grace, allowance and forgiveness that we all deserve at that age." Tammy Murphy, meanwhile, called the College Democrats of New Jersey's vice president to apologize. Kim responded on X (Twitter), saying, in part, "This is why people lose faith in democracy and our system." On January 17, the CDA called on the national Democratic National Committee to open an investigation into what happened between the state party and Murphy's campaign, while reaffirming their support for Kim saying: "We will not be intimidated or silenced by those who seek to undermine our values and our vision for a more just and equitable world."

On February 5, 2024, the Murphy campaign unveiled a large list of endorsements from Monmouth County Democratic officials. However, later that day, multiple people whose names were on the list denied ever having endorsed her, with many still claiming that they were neutral in the race. Despite his neutrality the day before, Bradley Beach Democratic Municipal Chair Steve Lozowick changed course again on February 6, announcing his support for Murphy.

On March 16, 2024, Murphy was endorsed by the Camden County Democratic Committee, having already received the support of powerbroker George Norcross. However, at the committee meeting (which was largely just a formality due to the county's lack of an open convention), candidate Patricia Campos-Medina was denied entry, being physically barred by multiple guards. This incident led to a condemnation by Kim (who had also been denied access after requesting speaking time prior to the event), while Murphy stated that "You'll have to talk to Camden" when asked about the incident. Murphy's response to the incident, along with other alleged concerns, led to Jersey City mayor Steven Fulop pulling his support for Murphy the following day and backing Kim, according to Fulop.

On March 17, 2024, the Hoboken Democrats voted to endorse Kim for Senate. Shortly after, chair Rachel Hodes resigned, stating that she had been receiving pressure since February by officials from both the Murphy and Menendez campaigns, as well as the Hudson County Democratic Organization, to change the Hoboken endorsement process as a way to prevent a Kim endorsement.

=== County lines ===
Although the practice was recently enjoined by a federal judge in Kim v. Hanlon, New Jersey is alone among the 50 states in authorizing local officials to award a strongly favorable ballot position to favored candidates in a prominent column on the ballot called the "county line." The county line on the ballot had come under heavy criticism during the Senate primary as an allegedly undemocratic result of political machine and political boss power in the state.

Due to this unique preferential-ballot-placement "county line" system in New Jersey, some NJ county parties hold conventions to decide which candidate gains the sought-after county-endorsed ballot position in the June primary, while other counties issue the line by private leadership fiat. The first in the state convention in Monmouth County is often considered a bellwether for other conventions throughout the state, and has been called the "Iowa caucus of the New Jersey Senate race." On February 10, 2024, Kim won the convention in what some described as an upset victory, where it was assumed Murphy would perform better, especially in her home county.

Uniquely among the states, New Jersey law authorizes a county chair of the county political party to make their own sole decision as an individual as to whom to award the line. Nevertheless, excluding Sussex and Salem, which do not award a line but do provide an endorsement, processes vary by custom in each county as detailed in this collapsible table on the primary lines as awarded during county award season:

County	Date of convention (or private leadership decision)	Endorsement process	Voting method	Winner	Number of registered Democratic voters in county
Atlantic	March 17, 2024	Open convention	Secret ballot	Kim	69,141
Bergen	March 4, 2024	Open convention	Secret ballot	Murphy	252,716
Burlington	February 25, 2024	Open convention	Secret ballot	Kim	139,854
Camden	March 16, 2024 (date of leadership decision)	No convention; chair alone	None	Murphy	180,907
Cape May	March 11, 2024	Open convention	Secret ballot	No endorsement awarded	18,207
Cumberland	March 21, 2024	Procedurally disputed between two factions	Procedurally disputed between two factions	No endorsement awarded due to dispute	32,004
Essex		No convention; chair alone	None	Murphy	295,958
Gloucester	March 18, 2024 (date of leadership decision)	No convention; chair alone	None	Murphy	84,006
Hudson	March 15, 2024 (date of formal announcement of leadership decision)	No convention; chair alone	None	Murphy	218,173
Hunterdon	February 25, 2024	Open convention	Secret ballot	Kim	30,200
Mercer	March 11, 2024	Open convention	Secret ballot	Kim	117,705
Middlesex	March 14, 2024	Open convention that serves as a ratification of the chair's endorsement	Public vote by show of hands with no count (ratification of chair's choice)	Murphy	240,691
Monmouth	February 18, 2024	Open convention	Secret ballot	Kim	139,580
Morris	March 16, 2024	Open convention	Secret ballot	Kim	116,586
Ocean	March 10, 2024	Open convention	Secret ballot	Kim	97,815
Passaic	February 10, 2024 (date of leadership decision)	No convention; screening committee of the county chairman and municipal chairs	None	Murphy	71,716
Salem (Note: Does not use county lines on its primary ballots)	March 23, 2024	Open convention (for endorsement; no line in county)	Secret ballot	Murphy	14,487
Somerset	March 7, 2024	Open convention	Public vote (by show of placards)	Murphy	90,417
Sussex	March 2, 2024 (date of endorsement but no county line is awarded)	Open convention (for endorsement; no line in county)	Secret ballot (for endorsement; no line in county)	Kim	26,323
Union	March 2, 2024 (date of leadership decision)	No convention; each municipal chair gets one vote	Public vote (of chairs) at an unannounced private meeting	Murphy	177,624
Warren	March 3, 2024	Open convention	Secret ballot	Kim	23,153

A professor and director of the Eagleton Center for Public Interest Polling at Rutgers University opined to The Hill that a major distinction existed between the Murphy-as-victor county endorsements and the Kim-as-victor county endorsements. While Kim won almost all of the county endorsements chosen by a secret ballot at an open convention, Murphy did better in convention-free counties where a county chair decides individually who to back. Said the director: "I think their wins show this steep division where Kim has been winning all of the open conventions, and Tammy Murphy has been winning the conventions that have some sort of advisory panel or advisory vote or party boss at the helm."

On February 12, 2024, it was revealed that prior to her loss at the Monmouth County Democratic Convention, Murphy was repeatedly offered a shared line that she could jointly run on with Kim, but she rejected it, believing that she had enough votes to secure the line for herself. On February 15, it was reported that a similar deal was being proposed for Burlington County by state senator Troy Singleton, who was also attempting to avoid a convention fight between two candidates vying for Kim's House seat, state representatives Herb Conaway and Carol Murphy. On February 18, after the first debate between Kim and Murphy, Kim said that he would not accept a shared line deal in Burlington unless Murphy was willing to share the line in every county. He also stated that the Murphys themselves were behind the push in Burlington for a shared line deal. A third deal was attempted on February 25, by Hunterdon County Democratic Chair Arlene Quiñones Perez (recently appointed to the New Jersey Racing Commission by Murphy's husband) where any candidate who received more than 30% of the Hunterdon County convention results would get the line, forcing Kim to share the line despite winning the vote, but this was defeated in a voice vote by the convention attendees.

In Bergen County where Murphy won the county line, Kim supporters alleged that the county chair, Paul Juliano, who was recently placed with the governor's support in a $280,000-a-year New Jersey Sports and Exposition Authority job, and the county leadership suppressed efforts to allow Kim to speak to delegates and stacked the committee unilaterally with bonus voting delegates loyal to the chair.

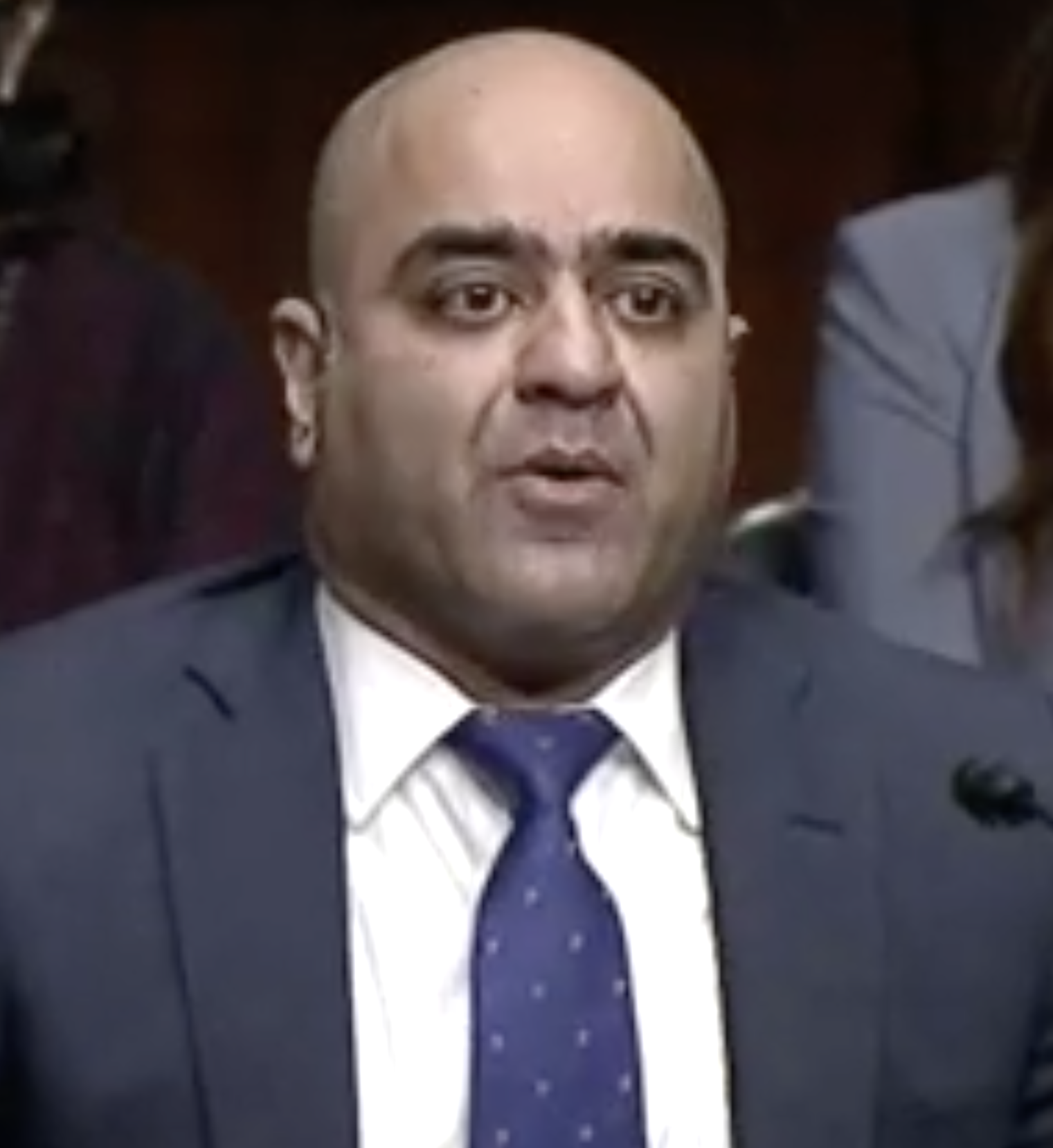
Federal judge Zahid Quraishi issued an injunction against the county line on March 29, directing clerks to instead print ballots with candidates organized by office in randomized order.

In Somerset County, where the county chair, Peg Schaffer, a recently added board member at the New Jersey Sports and Exposition Authority, had endorsed Murphy and where a whole-committee vote for the line was held on March 7, some committee members advocated for the usual show of hands or otherwise public vote to be replaced by a secret ballot at the line award in order to quell fears about retaliation. At the Somerset convention, the county chair denied a motion for secret ballot as "out of order" and the vote was held by a show of hands. A Star-Ledger columnist who attended the Somerset convention sharply criticized it as undemocratic and preferentially structured in Murphy's favor, pointing out that the county chair had sent out an advertisement in the name of the county party in support of Murphy in advance, had refused to allow confidential ballots, and had sent out a letter pointedly reminding delegates of the "rewarding" state and county jobs that delegates had allegedly received with Murphy's help.

In Cape May County, county chair Marie Blistan, the former president of the New Jersey Education Association, as well as the rest of the county Democratic officials, voted to not endorse in the race, thus creating an open primary within the county (the same choice was made for the concurrent primary for New Jersey's 2nd congressional district).

In Middlesex County, the county chair, Kevin McCabe, who is a lobbyist before the Murphy Administration on matters of wind power, was nominated by Murphy's husband to the powerful board of the Port Authority of New York and New Jersey, and has the sole authority to award the line as he sees fit, denied a floor motion for a secret ballot at the gathering to award the line despite alleged chanting for same by delegates (according to the Kim campaign, as reporters were barred from the event).

In Cumberland County, the Democratic party was split into two rivaling factions, one ran by county chair Kevin McCann (backing Murphy), and the other ran by anti-McCann committeemembers (backing Kim). Neither group made a formal endorsement, leaving no candidate to receive the line.

After Murphy's withdrawal from the race, counties that awarded their lines to Murphy would have the option to award the line to Kim instead. Kim was able to receive the line in 17 of the 19 counties that award a line, with Cumberland not awarding one due to their split organization and Kim rejecting the Camden line due to their presence as the opposing council in his lawsuit against the line.

==== County line federal lawsuit ====
On February 26, 2024, Kim filed a federal lawsuit, Kim v. Hanlon, in the District Court of New Jersey, aiming to redesign the primary ballot in New Jersey and claiming that the current preferential ballot placement is unconstitutional. At the time of the filing, the Murphy campaign called the suit a "sad hypocritical stunt."

On March 29, Judge Zahid Quraishi issued an injunction in the suit against the county line, directing clerks to instead print ballots with candidates organized by office in randomized order for the 2024 primary election.

=== Candidates ===
==== Nominee ====
- Andy Kim, U.S. representative from New Jersey's 3rd congressional district (2019–2024)

==== Eliminated in primary ====
- Patricia Campos-Medina, executive director of The Worker Institute at the Cornell University School of Industrial and Labor Relations
- Lawrence Hamm, community organizer, former Newark Board of Education member, and candidate for U.S. Senate in 2020

==== Withdrawn ====
- Kyle Jasey, real estate investor and son of state assemblywoman Mila Jasey (ran for U.S. House)
- Christina Khalil, social worker (switched to the Green Party)
- Tammy Murphy, First Lady of New Jersey (2018–2026), co-owner and chair of NJ/NY Gotham FC, and former financial analyst
- Joe Signorello, mayor of Roselle Park and nominee for SD-21 in 2021 (ran for U.S. House)

==== Declined ====
- Josh Gottheimer, U.S. representative from New Jersey's 5th congressional district (2017–present) (ran for re-election, ran for governor in 2025, endorsed Murphy, then Kim)
- Tom Malinowski, former U.S. representative from New Jersey's 7th congressional district (2019–2023) (endorsed Kim)
- Bob Menendez, incumbent U.S. senator (ran as an independent before withdrawing)
- Donald Norcross, U.S. representative from New Jersey's 1st congressional district (2014–present) (ran for re-election, endorsed Murphy)
- Frank Pallone, U.S. representative from New Jersey's 6th congressional district (1988–present) and candidate for U.S. Senate in 2013 (ran for re-election, endorsed Murphy)
- Mikie Sherrill, U.S. representative from New Jersey's 11th congressional district (2019–2025) (ran for re-election, ran successfully for governor in 2025, endorsed Murphy, then Kim)
- Robert Torricelli, former U.S. senator (1997–2003)

=== Endorsements ===
Patricia Campos-Medina

State legislators

- Sadaf Jaffer, former state assemblywoman from 16th district (2022–2024)

Local officials

- Wilda Diaz, former mayor of Perth Amboy (2008–2020)

Party officials

- Mike Sikand, Oceanport Democratic chair

Organizations

- PODER PAC

Labor unions

- Laundry, Distribution and Food Service Joint Board
- United Farm Workers
Andy Kim

Executive branch officials

- Susan Rice, U.S. National Security advisor (2013–2017)

U.S. senators

- Tammy Duckworth, U.S. senator from Illinois (2017–present)
- John Fetterman, U.S. senator from Pennsylvania (2023–present)

U.S. representatives

- Brendan Boyle, U.S. representative from PA-02 (2015–present)
- Madeleine Dean, U.S. representative from PA-04 (2019–present)
- Dwight Evans, U.S. representative from PA-03 (2019–present)
- Gabby Giffords, former U.S. representative from AZ-08 (2007–2012)
- Josh Gottheimer, U.S. representative from NJ-05 (2017–present) (previously endorsed Murphy)
- Rush Holt Jr., former U.S. representative from NJ-12 (1999–2015)
- Chrissy Houlahan, U.S. representative from PA-06 (2019–present)
- Tom Malinowski, former U.S. representative from NJ-07 (2019–2023)
- Grace Meng, U.S. representative from NY-06 (2013–present)
- Seth Moulton, U.S. representative from MA-06 (2015–present)
- Bill Pascrell, U.S. representative from NJ-09 (1997–2024) (deceased) (previously endorsed Murphy)
- Mary Gay Scanlon, U.S. representative from PA-05 (2018–present)
- Mikie Sherrill, U.S. representative from NJ-11 (2019–2025) (previously endorsed Murphy)
- Susan Wild, U.S. representative from PA-07 (2018–2025)

State legislators

- Herb Conaway, state assemblyman from the 7th district (1998–2025)
- ~~Carol Murphy, state assemblywoman from the 7th district (2018–present)~~ (switched to declining to endorse)
- Troy Singleton, New Jersey Senate majority whip (2022–present) from the 7th district (2018–present)

County officials

- Balvir Singh, Burlington County commissioner (2018–2025)
- 4 other Burlington County commissioners

Local officials

- Ravinder Bhalla, mayor of Hoboken (2018–2026) and candidate for NJ-08 in 2024
- Steven Fulop, mayor of Jersey City (2013–2026) (previously endorsed Murphy)
- James Solomon, Jersey City councilor from ward E (2017–2026)
- Joyce Watterman, president of the Jersey City Council (2023–present) from the at-large district (2013–present)
- 10 other mayors

Individuals

- Sue Altman, former executive director of the New Jersey Working Families Party and candidate for NJ-07 in 2024
- Fred Guttenberg, gun-control activist
- Andrew Yang, co-chair of Forward Party (2022–present)

Party chapters

- 30 municipal Democratic committees

Political parties

- Atlantic County Democratic Party
- Bergen County Democratic Party (previously endorsed Murphy)
- Burlington County Democratic Party
- Cape May County Democratic Party (previously declined to endorse)
- Essex County Democratic Party (previously endorsed Murphy)
- Gloucester County Democratic Party (previously endorsed Murphy)
- Hudson County Democratic Party (previously endorsed Murphy)
- Hunterdon County Democratic Party
- Mercer County Democratic Party
- Middlesex County Democratic Party (previously endorsed Murphy)
- Monmouth County Democratic Party
- Morris County Democratic Party
- Ocean County Democratic Party
- Passaic County Democratic Party (previously endorsed Murphy)
- Somerset County Democratic Party (previously endorsed Murphy)
- Sussex County Democratic Party
- Union County Democratic Party (previously endorsed Murphy)
- Warren County Democratic Party

Organizations

- AAPI Victory Fund
- Asian American Action Fund
- ASPIRE PAC
- Brady PAC
- College Democrats of America
- College Democrats of New Jersey
- Council for a Livable World
- Democratic Coalition of Ocean County
- End Citizens United
- Giffords
- Human Rights Campaign
- Indivisible
- League of Conservation Voters (previously endorsed Menendez)
- Mercer County Democratic Progressive Caucus
- MoveOn
- National Organization for Women
- Princeton Community Democratic Organization
- Reproductive Freedom for All
- Sierra Club
- VoteVets.org
- With Honor Fund

Newspapers and other media

- Daily Kos
- The Philadelphia Inquirer
- The Star-Ledger

Labor unions

- 1199SEIU United Healthcare Workers East
- American Federation of State, County and Municipal Employees - International and New Jersey Council 63
- Communications Workers of America
- International Federation of Professional and Technical Engineers
- National Education Association
- Retail, Wholesale and Department Store Union
- SEIU 32BJ
Tammy Murphy (withdrawn)

Executive branch officials

- Alan Solomont, former U.S. ambassador to Spain (2010–2013)

U.S. representatives

- ~~Josh Gottheimer, U.S. representative from NJ-05 (2017–present)~~ (switched endorsement to Kim)
- Donald Norcross, U.S. representative from NJ-01 (2014–present)
- Frank Pallone, U.S. representative from NJ-06 (1988–present)
- ~~Bill Pascrell, U.S. representative from NJ-09 (1997–present)~~ (switched endorsement to Kim)
- Donald Payne Jr., U.S. representative from NJ-10 (2012–2024) (deceased)
- ~~Mikie Sherrill, U.S. representative from NJ-11 (2019–2025)~~ (switched endorsement to Kim)
- Albio Sires, mayor of West New York (1995–2006; 2023–present) and former U.S. representative from NJ-08 (2006–2023)

Statewide officials

- Richard Codey, former governor of New Jersey (2002; 2004–2006)
- Howard Dean, former governor of Vermont (1991–2003)
- Steven Grossman, former treasurer and receiver-general of Massachusetts (2011–2015)
- Maura Healey, governor of Massachusetts (2023–present)
- Phil Murphy, governor of New Jersey (2018–2026) (candidate's husband)
- Ed Rendell, former governor of Pennsylvania (2003–2011)
- Josh Shapiro, governor of Pennsylvania (2023–present)

State legislators

- 12 state senators, including senate president Nicholas Scutari
- 15 state assemblymembers

County officials

- Ernest Coursey, Atlantic County commissioner from the 1st district
- Anthony Cureton, Bergen County sheriff
- Joseph N. DiVincenzo Jr., Essex County executive (2003–present)
- Romaine Graham, Essex County commissioner
- Craig Guy, Hudson County executive (2024–present)
- John Hogan, Bergen County Clerk
- Steve Peter, Somerset County Clerk
- Darrin Russo, Somerset County sheriff
- Jim Tedesco, Bergen County executive (2015–present)
- Joan Voss, Bergen County commissioner (2012–present)
- 6 other Bergen County commissioners
- 9 Hudson County commissioners
- 5 Somerset County commissioners

Mayors

- ~~Steven Fulop, Jersey City (2013–2026)~~ (switched endorsement to Kim)
- Reed Gusciora, Trenton (2018–present)
- Marty Small Sr., Atlantic City (2019–present)
- Mark Sokolich, Fort Lee (2008–present)
- Michael Wildes, Englewood (2004–2010; 2019–present)
- Dawn Zimmer, Hoboken (2009–2018)
- 48 others

Party officials

- LeRoy J. Jones Jr., New Jersey Democratic Party Chair (2021–present)
- Democratic county chairs for Bergen, Camden, Essex, Gloucester, Hudson, Middlesex, Passaic, Somerset, and Union

Individuals

- George Helmy, former chief of staff to Phil Murphy
- Amy Kennedy, educator
- Barbara Lee, philanthropist
- George Norcross, businessman and brother of Donald Norcross

Party chapters

- 75 municipal Democratic committees

Political parties

- ~~Bergen County Democratic Party~~ (switched endorsement to Kim)
- ~~Camden County Democratic Party~~ (switched to declining to endorse)
- ~~Essex County Democratic Party~~ (switched endorsement to Kim)
- ~~Gloucester County Democratic Party~~ (switched endorsement to Kim)
- ~~Hudson County Democratic Party~~ (switched endorsement to Kim)
- ~~Middlesex County Democratic Party~~ (switched endorsement to Kim)
- ~~Passaic County Democratic Party~~ (switched endorsement to Kim)
- Salem County Democratic Party
- ~~Somerset County Democratic Party~~ (switched endorsement to Kim)
- ~~Union County Democratic Party~~ (switched endorsement to Kim)

Organizations

- EMILY's List
- National Women's Political Caucus

Labor unions

- Amalgamated Transit Union
- Eastern Atlantic States Regional Council of Carpenters
- International Association of Bridge, Structural, Ornamental and Reinforcing Iron Workers
- International Federation of Professional and Technical Engineers Local 194
- International Union of Painters and Allied Trades District Council 21
- New Jersey State Electrical Workers Association Construction Division
- New Jersey Firefighters Mutual Benevolent Association
- United Food and Commercial Workers
Kyle Jasey (withdrawn)

State legislators

- Mila Jasey, state assemblywoman from the 27th district (2007–2024) (candidate's mother)
Joe Signorello (withdrawn)

Executive branch officials

- Christine Todd Whitman, former administrator of the Environmental Protection Agency (2001–2003) and governor of New Jersey (1994–2001) (Forward)

Organizations

- Forward Party
Declined to endorse

U.S. representatives

- Bonnie Watson Coleman, U.S. representative from NJ-12 (2015–present)
- Rob Menendez, U.S. representative from NJ-08 (2023–present)

State legislators

- Carol Murphy, state assemblywoman from the 7th district (2018–present) (previously endorsed Kim)
- Shavonda Sumter, state assemblywoman from the 35th district (2012–2026)
- Loretta Weinberg, former majority leader of the New Jersey Senate (2012–2022) from the 37th district (2005–2022)

Local officials

- Dan Benson, Mercer County executive (2024–present)

Party officials

- Marie Blistan, chair of the Cape May County Democratic Party
- Steve Caltabiano, chair of the Salem County Democratic Party
- Janice Mironov, chair of the Mercer County Democratic Party and mayor of East Windsor
- Michael Suleiman, chair of the Atlantic County Democratic Party

Individuals

- ~~Sue Altman, former executive director of the New Jersey Working Families Party and candidate for NJ-07 in 2024~~ (switched endorsement to Kim)
- Tammy Murphy, First Lady of New Jersey (2018–2026), co-owner and chair of NJ/NY Gotham FC, and former financial analyst

Political parties

- Camden County Democratic Party (previously endorsed Murphy)
- ~~Cape May County Democratic Party~~ (switched endorsement to Kim)
- Cumberland County Democratic Party

=== Convention results ===
County Convention results

Monmouth County Democratic Convention (February 10)
Party	Candidate	Votes	%
Democratic	Andy Kim	265	56.8%
Democratic	Tammy Murphy	181	38.8%
Democratic	Patricia Campos-Medina	20	4.3%
Democratic	Lawrence Hamm (Note: Withdrew from participation in this convention but remained on ballot.)	0	0.0%
Total votes		466	100.0%

Burlington County Democratic Convention (February 24)
Party	Candidate	Votes	%
Democratic	Andy Kim	245	90.4%
Democratic	Tammy Murphy	21	7.8%
Democratic	Patricia Campos-Medina	3	1.1%
Democratic	Lawrence Hamm	2	0.7%
Total votes		271	100.0%

Hunterdon County Democratic Convention (February 25)
Party	Candidate	Votes	%
Democratic	Andy Kim	120	62.2%
Democratic	Tammy Murphy	64	33.2%
Democratic	Patricia Campos-Medina	9	4.7%
Total votes		193	100.0%

Sussex County Democratic Convention (March 2) (Note: This convention does not award a line)
Party	Candidate	Votes	%
Democratic	Andy Kim	101	56.7%
Democratic	Tammy Murphy	76	42.7%
Democratic	Lawrence Hamm	1	0.6%
Democratic	Patricia Campos-Medina	0	0.0%
Total votes		178	100.0%

Union County Democratic Screening Committee (March 2)
Party	Candidate	Votes	%
Democratic	Tammy Murphy	19	86.4%
Democratic	Andy Kim	3	13.6%
Democratic	Patricia Campos-Medina	0	0.0%
Democratic	Lawrence Hamm	0	0.0%
Total votes		22	100.0%

Warren County Democratic Convention (March 3)
Party	Candidate	Votes	%
Democratic	Andy Kim	33	80.5%
Democratic	Tammy Murphy	6	14.6%
Democratic	Patricia Campos-Medina	2	4.9%
Democratic	Lawrence Hamm	0	0.0%
Total votes		41	100.0%

Bergen County Democratic Convention (March 4)
Party	Candidate	Votes	%
Democratic	Tammy Murphy	738	63.8%
Democratic	Andy Kim	419	36.2%
Total votes		1,157	100.0%

Somerset County Democratic Convention (March 7)
Party	Candidate	Votes	%
Democratic	Tammy Murphy	207	63.1%
Democratic	Andy Kim	106	32.3%
Democratic	Patricia Campos-Medina	15	4.6%
Total votes		328	100.0%

Ocean County Democratic Convention (March 10)
Party	Candidate	Votes	%
Democratic	Andy Kim	197	85.7%
Democratic	Tammy Murphy	31	13.5%
Democratic	Patricia Campos-Medina	3	8.7%
Total votes		230	100.0%

Mercer County Democratic Convention (March 11)
Party	Candidate	Votes	%
Democratic	Andy Kim	236	63.1%
Democratic	Tammy Murphy	108	28.9%
Democratic	Patricia Campos-Medina	22	5.9%
Democratic	Lawrence Hamm	8	2.1%
Total votes		374	100.0%

Morris County Democratic Convention (March 16–17)
Party	Candidate	Votes	%
Democratic	Andy Kim	457	84.6%
Democratic	Tammy Murphy	57	10.6%
Democratic	Patricia Campos-Medina	26	4.8%
Total votes		540	100.0%

Atlantic County Democratic Convention (March 17)
Party	Candidate	Votes	%
Democratic	Andy Kim	156	74.3%
Democratic	Tammy Murphy	54	25.7%
Total votes		210	100.0%

Salem County Democratic Convention (March 23)
Party	Candidate	Votes	%
Democratic	Tammy Murphy	13	61.9%
Democratic	Andy Kim	8	38.1%
Total votes		21	100.0%

=== Fundraising ===
Campaign finance reports as of May 15, 2024
Candidate	Raised	Spent	Cash on hand
Patricia Campos-Medina (D)	$430,674 (Note: $290,000 of this total was self-funded by Campos-Medina)	$405,011	$25,662
Lawrence Hamm (D) (Note: Did not file for pre-primary deadline)	$25,362 (Note: $700 of this total was self-funded by Hamm)	$11,424.35	$13,937.65
Andy Kim (D)	$7,868,353	$3,941,232	$4,089,654
Source: Federal Election Commission

=== Debates ===
A WNBC spokesman stated that Kim and Murphy would debate in person in May 2024 at 30 Rockefeller Plaza, to be broadcast state-wide.

Kim and Murphy on Sunday, February 18, 2024, both participated in a live streamed event hosted by the New Jersey Globe, rather than an in-person debate. Both candidates were invited to a previous debate on February 4; Kim accepted, but Murphy declined. As a result, Kim appeared before a panel of journalists alone to discuss his candidacy.

A third debate was announced on April 30, 2024, to be hosted by WNYC, New Jersey Public Radio, the American Civil Liberties Union, and Salvation for Social Justice. Unlike the previous debates, Campos-Medina and Hamm were invited to participate. The debate was broadcast via WHYY-FM.

Debates among candidates for the Democratic nomination for Senate in New Jersey
No.	Date and time	Host	Moderator	Link	Participants				
P Present A Absent I Invited N Not invited Out Out of race W Withdrawn					Campos-Medina	Hamm	Kim	Menendez	Murphy
1	February 18, 2024; 8 p.m. EST	New Jersey Globe; On New Jersey; Rebovich Institute	Laura Jones	YouTube	N (Note: Did not meet debate threshold by required date)	N	P	O (Note: Menendez was invited pending he announced his candidacy by February 11, 2024, but didn't.)	P
2	May 2024	NBC (Note: WCAU and WNBC); Telemundo (Note: WWSI and WNJU)	TBD	N/A	N	N	I	O	W
3	May 13, 2024	WNYC/NJPR (Note: Also broadcast in Southern Jersey via WHYY-FM); ACLU; League of Women Voters-NJ; Salvation for Social Justice	Michael Hill	YouTube	P	P	P	O	W

=== Polling ===
Poll source	Date(s) administered	Sample size (Note: Key: A – all adults RV – registered voters LV – likely voters V – unclear)	Margin of error	Patricia Campos-Medina	Lawrence Hamm	Bob Menendez	Andy Kim	Tammy Murphy	Other	Undecided
Emerson College	March 26–29, 2024	408 (RV)	± 4.8%	6%	5%	–	51%	–	–	38%
	March 24, 2024	Murphy withdraws from the race								
	March 21, 2024	Menendez declines to run in Democratic primary								
Braun Research/ Fairleigh Dickinson University	January 21–28, 2024	504 (LV)	± 4.5%	8%	–	9%	32%	20%	–	31%
Breakthrough Campaigns (Note: Poll commissioned on behalf of Kim's campaign)	December 7–14, 2023	1,040 (LV)	± 3.0%	–	4%	6%	45%	22%	6% (Note: "Waiting for another candidate" with 6%)	15%
Public Policy Polling (D)	November 13–14, 2023	560 (LV)	–	–	–	5%	40%	21%	–	34%
Public Policy Polling (D) (Note: Poll commissioned by End Citizens United and Let America Vote, which support Kim)	October 3–4, 2023	502 (LV)	± 4.4%	–	–	5%	42%	19%	–	34%
Public Policy Polling (D)	October 3–4, 2023	502 (LV)	± 4.4%	–	–	10%	63%	–	–	28%
Data for Progress (D)	September 29 – October 3, 2023	551 (LV)	± 4.4%	–	–	9%	48%	–	3% (Note: Kyle Jasey with 3%)	40%

Hypothetical polling

Poll source	Date(s) administered	Sample size	Margin of error	Josh Gottheimer	Kyle Jasey	Andy Kim	Bob Menendez	Tammy Murphy	Frank Pallone	Teresa Ruiz	Mikie Sherrill	Undecided
Data for Progress (D)	September 29 – October 3, 2023	551 (LV)	± 4.4%	6%	1%	27%	6%	4%	6%	1%	20%	29%

=== Results ===
Results by county: Kim: 50–60%; 60–70%; 70–80%; 80–90%; >90%

Democratic primary results
Party	Candidate	Votes	%
Democratic	Andy Kim	392,602	74.83%
Democratic	Patricia Campos-Medina	84,286	16.06%
Democratic	Lawrence Hamm	47,796	9.11%
Total votes		524,684	100.0%

== Republican primary ==
=== Candidates ===
==== Nominee ====
- Curtis Bashaw, real estate developer and former executive director of the Casino Reinvestment Development Authority

==== Eliminated in primary ====
- Albert Harshaw, business owner (previously ran for president)
- Justin Murphy, former deputy mayor of Tabernacle and candidate for New Jersey's 3rd congressional district in 2008 and 2010
- Christine Serrano Glassner, mayor of Mendham Borough (2019–2024)

==== Withdrawn ====
- Daniel Cruz, former member of the Andover Township Board of Education and candidate for SD-24 in 2021
- Shirley Maia-Cusick, immigration consulting firm owner (ran for U.S. House)
- Gregg Mele, attorney and perennial candidate (ran for U.S. House)
- Fred Schneiderman, investment executive and candidate for New Jersey's 5th congressional district in 2022
- Peter Vallorosi, construction contractor and candidate for New Jersey's 5th congressional district in 2016 (ran as an Independent)
- Alex Zdan, former News 12 reporter (endorsed Bashaw)

==== Declined ====
- Chris Christie, former governor of New Jersey (2010–2018) and candidate for president of the United States in 2016 (ran for president, endorsed Bashaw)
- Melinda Ciattarelli, business owner and wife of former state assemblyman Jack Ciattarelli (endorsed Schneiderman)
- Aura Dunn, state assemblywoman from the 25th district (2019–present)
- Edward Durr, former state senator from the 3rd district (2022–2024)
- Jeff Van Drew, U.S. representative for New Jersey's 2nd congressional district (2019–present) (ran for re-election)

=== Endorsements ===
Curtis Bashaw

Governors

- Chris Christie, former governor of New Jersey (2010–2018)

State senators

- Jean Stanfield, former state senator from the 8th district (2022–2024)
- Mike Testa, state senator from the 1st district (2019–present) and Cumberland County Republican chair (2014–present) (candidate's campaign chair)

State assemblymembers

- Al Barlas, state assemblymember from the 40th district (2024–present)
- Antwan McClellan, state assemblymember from the 1st district (2020–present)
- Erik Simonsen, state assemblymember from the 1st district (2020–present)

Organizations

- Log Cabin Republicans PAC

Local officials

- 4 Cape May County commissioners
- 9 mayors

Party officials

- Michael Donohue, Cape May County Republican chair

Individuals

- Alex Zdan, former News 12 reporter

Political parties

- Atlantic County Republican Party
- Burlington County Republican Party
- Camden County Republican Party
- Cape May County Republican Party
- Cumberland County Republican Party
- Essex County Republican Party
- Gloucester County Republican Party
- Mercer County Republican Party
- Middlesex County Republican Party
- Monmouth County Republican Party (previously endorsed Zdan)
- Ocean County Republican Party
- Passaic County Republican Party (previously endorsed Zdan)
- Salem County Republican Party
- Somerset County Republican Party

Party chapters

- 15 municipal Republican committees
Justin Murphy

Organizations

- New Jersey Right to Life
Christine Serrano Glassner

Executive branch officials

- Ben Carson, former U.S. secretary of Housing and Urban Development (2017–2021)
- Richard Grenell, former U.S. ambassador to Germany (2018–2020) and former acting director of National Intelligence (2020)
- Donald Trump, former president (2017–2021)

U.S. senators

- Markwayne Mullin, U.S. senator from Oklahoma (2023–present)
- Marco Rubio, U.S. senator from Florida (2011–2025)
- Tommy Tuberville, U.S. senator from Alabama (2021–present)

U.S. representatives

- Matt Gaetz, U.S. representative from FL-1 (2017–2024)
- Thomas Kean Jr., U.S. representative from NJ-7 (2023–present)

Statewide officials

- Doug Burgum, governor of North Dakota (2016–2024)

State senators

- Jon Bramnick, state senator from the 21st district (2022–present) and former minority leader of the New Jersey General Assembly (2012–2022) from the 21st district (2003–2022)
- Ed Durr, former state senator from the 3rd district (2022–2024)
- Joseph Pennacchio, New Jersey Senate minority whip (2017–present) from the 26th district (2008–present)

State assemblymembers

- Robert Auth, state assemblymember from the 39th district (2014–present)
- Christian Barranco, state assemblymember from the 26th district (2022–2026)
- Brian Bergen, state assemblymember from the 25th district (2020–present)
- Jack Ciattarelli, former state assemblyman from the 16th district (2011–2018)
- Mike Inganamort, state assemblyman from the 24th district (2024–present)
- Michele Matsikoudis, state assemblymember from the 21st district (2022–2026)
- Nancy Munoz, state assemblymember from the 21st district (2009–2026)

Local officials

- 6 Morris County commissioners
- 20 mayors

Party officials

- Laura Ali, Morris County Republican chair
- Jose Arango, Hudson County Republican chair

Individuals

- Vivek Ramaswamy, pharmaceutical executive and 2024 Republican presidential candidate
- Roger Stone, political consultant and lobbyist
- Donald Trump Jr., businessman and son of former president Donald Trump

Political parties

- Bergen County Republican Party
- Hudson County Republican Party
- Hunterdon County Republican Party
- Morris County Republican Party
- Sussex County Republican Party
- Union County Republican Party
- Warren County Republican Party

Organizations

- Conservative Political Action Committee
Gregg Mele (withdrawn)

Party chapters

- Union Township Republicans
Alex Zdan (withdrawn)

Political parties

- ~~Monmouth County Republican Party~~ (switched endorsement to Bashaw)
- ~~Passaic County Republican Party~~ (switched endorsement to Bashaw)
Declined to endorse

U.S. representatives

- Jeff Van Drew, U.S. representative from NJ-2 (2019–present)

Newspapers

- The Philadelphia Inquirer

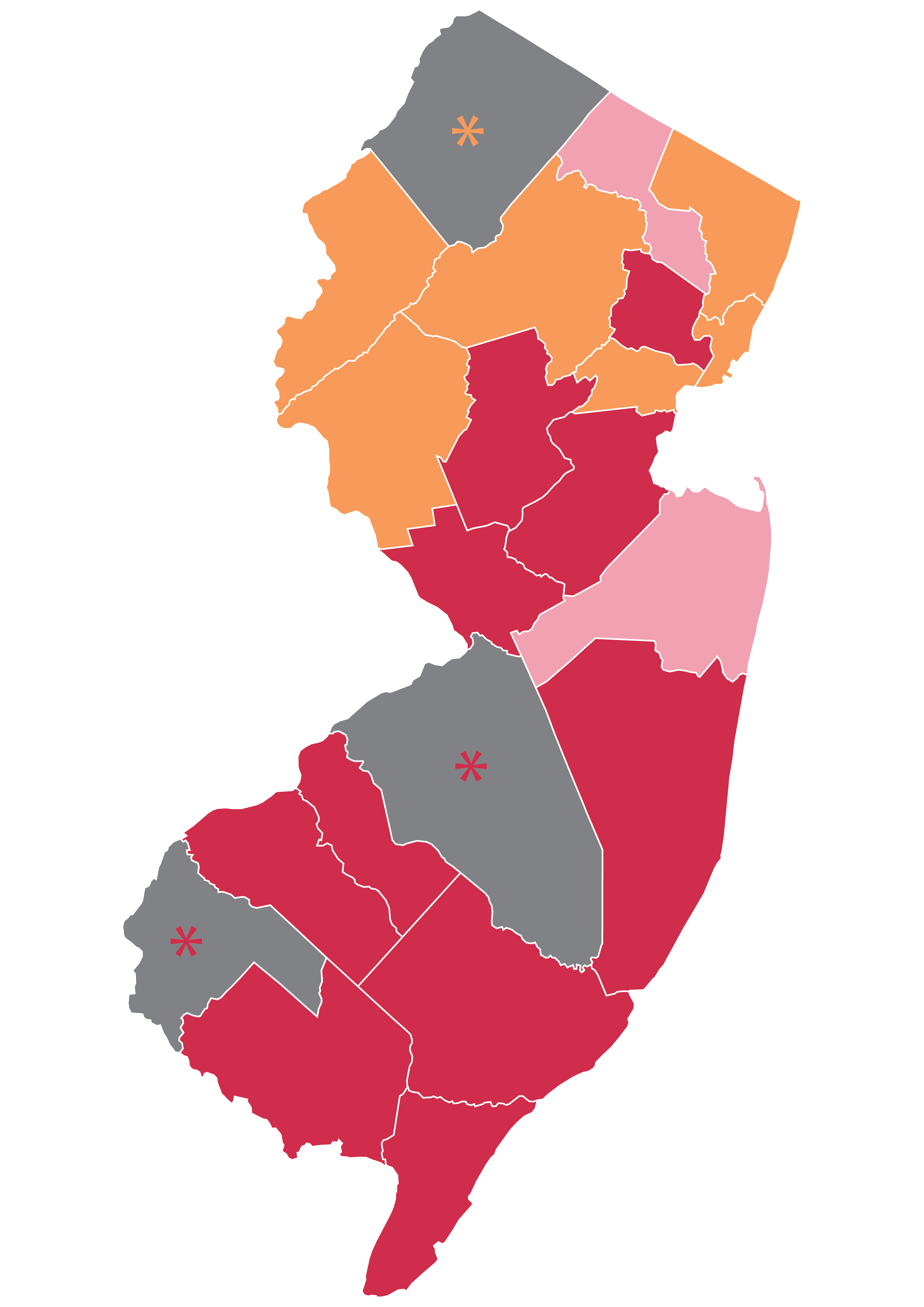
County party endorsements Bashaw No county line Serrano Glassner Bashaw, formerly Zdan *signifies endorsement in a county that does not use the county line

==== County Conventions ====
County Convention results

Hunterdon County Republican Convention (February 7)
Party	Candidate	Votes	%
Republican	Christine Serrano Glassner	87	56.9%
Republican	Curtis Bashaw	54	35.3%
Republican	Alex Zdan	12	7.8%
Republican	Michael Estrada	0	0.0%
Republican	Gregg Mele	0	0.0%
Republican	Albert Harshaw	0	0.0%
Total votes		153	100.0%

Union County Republican Convention (February 8)
Party	Candidate	Votes	%
Republican	Christine Serrano Glassner	152	66.1%
Republican	Curtis Bashaw	62	27.0%
Republican	Gregg Mele	16	7.0%
Total votes		230	100.0%

Morris County Republican Convention (February 20)
Party	Candidate	Votes	%
Republican	Christine Serrano Glassner	279	73.6%
Republican	Curtis Bashaw	100	26.4%
Total votes		379	100.0%

Atlantic County Republican Convention (February 24)
Party	Candidate	Votes	%
Republican	Curtis Bashaw	953	78.2%
Republican	Alex Zdan	265	21.8%
Total votes		1,218	100.0%

Ocean County Republican Convention (February 29)
Party	Candidate	Votes	%
Republican	Curtis Bashaw	163	72.8%
Republican	Christine Serrano Glassner	49	21.9%
Republican	Alex Zdan	12	5.4%
Total votes		224	100.0%

Monmouth County Republican Convention (February 29)
Party	Candidate	Votes	%
Republican	Alex Zdan	103	42.2%
Republican	Curtis Bashaw	101	41.4%
Republican	Christine Serrano Glassner	40	16.4%
Total votes		244	100.0%

Monmouth County Republican Convention runoff (February 29)
Party	Candidate	Votes	%
Republican	Alex Zdan	111	57.5%
Republican	Curtis Bashaw	82	42.5%
Total votes		193	100.0%

Warren County Republican Convention (March 2)
Party	Candidate	Votes	%
Republican	Christine Serrano Glassner	58	81.7%
Republican	Curtis Bashaw	13	18.3%
Total votes		71	100.0%

Somerset County Republican Convention (March 5)
Party	Candidate	Votes	%
Republican	Curtis Bashaw	90	42.1%
Republican	Christine Serrano Glassner	68	31.8%
Republican	Alex Zdan	50	23.4%
Republican	Albert Harshaw	6	2.8%
Total votes		214	100.0%

Somerset County Republican Convention runoff (March 5)
Party	Candidate	Votes	%
Republican	Curtis Bashaw	110	56.7%
Republican	Christine Serrano Glassner	84	43.3%
Total votes		194	100.0%

Mercer County Republican Convention (March 13)
Party	Candidate	Votes	%
Republican	Curtis Bashaw	78	75.7%
Republican	Alex Zdan	24	23.3%
Republican	Christine Serrano Glassner (Note: Did not participate in this convention but received a vote.)	1	1.0%
Republican	Albert Harshaw	0	0.0%
Republican	Justin Michael Murphy	0	0.0%
Total votes		103	100.0%

Middlesex County Republican Convention (March 14)
Party	Candidate	Votes	%
Republican	Curtis Bashaw	117	81.8%
Republican	Justin Michael Murphy	16	11.2%
Republican	Alex Zdan	7	4.9%
Republican	Albert Harshaw	3	2.1%
Total votes		143	100.0%

Cape May County Republican Convention (March 14)
Party	Candidate	Votes	%
Republican	Curtis Bashaw	121	100.0%
Republican	Brian Jackson	0	0.0%
Republican	Christine Serrano Glassner	0	0.0%
Republican	Gregg Mele (Note: Withdrew from the race prior to this convention.)	0	0.0%
Total votes		121	100.0%

Bergen County Republican Convention (March 19)
Party	Candidate	Votes	%
Republican	Christine Serrano Glassner	254	39.9%
Republican	Curtis Bashaw	200	31.5%
Republican	Fred Schneiderman	99	15.6%
Republican	Alex Zdan	80	12.6%
Republican	Brian Jackson	2	0.3%
Republican	Justin Michael Murphy	1	0.2%
Total votes		636	100.0%

=== Fundraising ===
Campaign finance reports as of May 15, 2024
Candidate	Raised	Spent	Cash on hand
Curtis Bashaw (R)	$1,417,913 (Note: $800,000 of this total was self funded by Bashaw)	$893,230	$524,682
Justin Murphy (R)	$9,938 (Note: $3,750 of this total was self funded by Murphy)	$10,301	$0
Christine Seranno Glassner (R)	$474,906 (Note: $300,000 of this total was self-funded by Glassner)	$212,486	$262,419
Source: Federal Election Commission

=== Debates ===
Debates among candidates for the Republican nomination for Senate in New Jersey
No.	Date and time	Host	Moderator	Link	Participants		
P Present A Absent I Invited N Not invited Out Out of race W Withdrawn					Bashaw	Serrano- Glassner	Zdan
1	April 3, 2024; 8 p.m. EST	New Jersey Globe; On New Jersey; Rebovich Institute	Laura Jones	Link	A	P	W

=== Polling ===
Poll source	Date(s) administered	Sample size	Margin of error	Curtis Bashaw	Albert Harshaw	Justin Murphy	Peter Vallorosi	Christine Serrano Glassner	Undecided
Emerson College	March 26–29, 2024	310 (RV)	± 5.5%	3%	2%	4%	3%	5%	84%

=== Results ===
Results by county Bashaw: 30–40%; 50–60%; 60–70%; 70–80%; Serrano Glassner: 50–60%; 60–70%; 70–80%

Republican primary results
Party	Candidate	Votes	%
Republican	Curtis Bashaw	144,869	45.57%
Republican	Christine Serrano Glassner	121,986	38.38%
Republican	Justin Murphy	35,954	11.31%
Republican	Albert Harshaw	15,064	4.74%
Total votes		317,873	100.0%

== Third parties and independents ==
=== Candidates ===
==== Declared ====
- Nicholas Carducci (Independent), software engineer
- Ken Kaplan (Libertarian), real estate broker and perennial candidate
- Christina Khalil (Green), social worker (switched from Democratic)
- Joanne Kuniansky (Socialist Workers), deli worker and perennial candidate
- Peter Vallorosi (Independent), construction contractor and candidate for New Jersey's 5th congressional district in 2016 (previously ran as a Republican)

==== Filed paperwork ====
- Michael Estrada (Independent), independent candidate for AD-23 in 2017 (switched from Republican)
- Patricia Mooneyham (Independent)
- Victor Joseph Scazzola (Independent)

==== Withdrawn ====
- Bob Menendez (Menendez for Senate), former U.S. senator

=== Fundraising ===
Campaign finance reports as of May 15, 2024
Candidate	Raised	Spent	Cash on hand
Michael Estrada (I)	$5,218.20 (Note: $5,000 of this total was self funded by Estrada)	$481.19	$4,737.01
Bob Menendez (I)	$10,960,363	$7,605,560	$3,573,234
Source: Federal Election Commission

== Interim appointment ==
Following his federal corruption conviction in July, Senator Bob Menendez announced he would resign from the Senate, effective on August 20, 2024. Governor Phil Murphy stated he would appoint an interim replacement for the current term until the November election. This announcement fueled speculation that Murphy would appoint Democratic nominee Andy Kim to the seat, as he was the favorite to win the general election. Republican nominee Curtis Bashaw released a public statement urging Murphy to appoint a caretaker to the seat, arguing selecting Kim would give him incumbency advantage. On July 16, Murphy appointed Port Authority of New York and New Jersey commissioner and his former chief of staff George Helmy to the seat.

=== Appointee ===
- George Helmy, commissioner of the Port Authority of New York and New Jersey (2023–present)

=== Reported shortlist ===
- Jeh Johnson, former U.S. secretary of Homeland Security (2013–2017)
- Bonnie Watson Coleman, U.S. representative from New Jersey's 12th congressional district (2015–present)
- Tahesha Way, lieutenant governor of New Jersey (2023–2026)
- Nina Mitchell Wells, former New Jersey secretary of state (2006–2010)

=== Potential candidates not appointed ===
- Patricia Campos-Medina, executive director of the Worker Institute at Cornell University and former candidate for this seat
- Richard Codey, former governor of New Jersey (2002, 2004–2006)
- Christian Fuscarino, executive director of Garden State Equality
- Dianne Houenou, chair of the New Jersey Cannabis Regulatory Commission (2021–present)
- Andy Kim, U.S. representative from New Jersey's 3rd congressional district (2019–2024) and Democratic nominee for this seat
- Matthew Platkin, New Jersey attorney general (2022–2026)
- Esther Salas, judge of the U.S. District Court for New Jersey (2011–present)
- Loretta Weinberg, former majority leader of the New Jersey Senate (2012–2022) from the 37th district (2005–2022)

=== Declined to be considered ===
- Tammy Murphy, First Lady of New Jersey (2018–present), co-owner and chair of NJ/NY Gotham FC, and former candidate for this seat

== General election ==
=== Predictions ===
Source	Ranking	As of
The Cook Political Report	Solid D	March 25, 2024
Inside Elections	Solid D	February 9, 2023
Sabato's Crystal Ball	Solid D	November 9, 2023
Decision Desk HQ/The Hill	Safe D	October 30, 2024
Elections Daily	Safe D	May 4, 2023
CNalysis	Safe D	November 21, 2023
RealClearPolitics	Likely D	August 5, 2024
Split Ticket	Safe D	October 23, 2024
538	Likely D	October 28, 2024

=== Post-primary endorsements ===
Andy Kim (D)

U.S. senators

- George Helmy, U.S. senator from New Jersey (2024)

U.S. representatives

- Rob Menendez, U.S. representative from NJ-08 (2023–present)

Organizations

- Planned Parenthood Action Fund
- Working Families Party

Labor unions

- Actors' Equity Association

Newspapers

- The Philadelphia Inquirer
- The Star-Ledger
Curtis Bashaw (R)

U.S. senators

- Steve Daines, U.S. senator from Montana (2015–present) and chair of the National Republican Senatorial Committee

Governors

- Thomas Kean, former governor of New Jersey (1982–1990)
Ken Kaplan (L)

Political parties

- New Jersey Libertarian Party

=== Fundraising ===
Campaign finance reports as of September 30, 2024
Candidate	Raised	Spent	Cash on hand
Andy Kim (D)	$11,388,210	$7,567,613	$3,983,128
Curtis Bashaw (R)	$3,850,134 (Note: $2,025,000 of this total was self funded by Bashaw)	$2,516,342	$1,333,792
Source: Federal Election Commission

=== Polling ===
Aggregate polling

Source of poll aggregation	Dates administered	Dates updated	Andy Kim (D)	Curtis Bashaw (R)	Undecided (Note: Calculated by taking the difference of 100% and all other candidates combined.)	Margin
270toWin	October 26 - November 4, 2024	November 4, 2024	53.3%	33.8%	12.9%	Kim +19.5%
TheHill/DDHQ	through November 3, 2024	November 4, 2024	55.4%	34.9%	9.7%	Kim +20.5%
Average			54.4%	34.4%	11.2%	Kim +20.0%

Poll source	Date(s) administered	Sample size	Margin of error	Andy Kim (D)	Curtis Bashaw (R)	Other	Undecided
Research Co.	November 2–3, 2024	450 (LV)	± 4.6%	56%	38%	2% (Note: "Some other candidate" with 2%)	4%
Fairleigh Dickinson University	October 20–27, 2024	806 (RV)	± 3.5%	57%	39%	–	4%
Cygnal (R)	October 23–24, 2024	600 (LV)	± 4.0%	55%	38%	3% (Note: "Third-party candidate not listed" with 3%)	4%
Rutgers University	October 15–22, 2024	929 (RV)	± 4.2%	49%	26%	–	19%
National Research Inc. (R) (Note: Poll sponsored by Bashaw's campaign)	August 13–15, 2024	600 (LV)	± 4.0%	38%	33%	–	22%
Expedition Strategies (Note: Poll Sponsored by Progressive Policy Institute)	June 24 – July 8, 2024	272 (LV)	–	50%	35%	–	15%
United 2024 (R)	July 1–2, 2024	477 (RV)	± 4.5%	41%	39%	–	20%
co/efficient (R)	June 26–27, 2024	810 (LV)	± 3.4%	41%	34%	–	25%
Fairleigh Dickinson University	April 1–8, 2024	809 (RV)	± 3.5%	47%	38%	–	15%

Hypothetical polling

Andy Kim vs. Curtis Bashaw vs. Bob Menendez

Poll source	Date(s) administered	Sample size	Margin of error	Andy Kim (D)	Curtis Bashaw (R)	Bob Menendez (I)	Undecided
United 2024 (R)	July 1–2, 2024	477 (RV)	4.5%	35%	33%	6%	26%
co/efficient (R)	June 26–27, 2024	810 (LV)	3.42%	39%	33%	3%	25%
Fairleigh Dickinson University	April 1–8, 2024	809 (RV)	3.5%	44%	38%	6%	12%

Andy Kim vs. Christine Serrano Glassner

Poll source	Date(s) administered	Sample size	Margin of error	Andy Kim (D)	Christine Serrano Glassner (R)	Undecided
Fairleigh Dickinson University	April 1–8, 2024	809 (RV)	3.5%	49%	39%	13%

Andy Kim vs. Christine Serrano Glassner vs. Bob Menendez as an independent

Poll source	Date(s) administered	Sample size	Margin of error	Andy Kim (D)	Christine Serrano Glassner (R)	Bob Menendez (I)	Undecided
Fairleigh Dickinson University	April 1–8, 2024	809 (RV)	3.5%	45%	39%	7%	10%

Bob Menendez vs. Chris Christie

Poll source	Date(s) administered	Sample size	Margin of error	Bob Menendez (D)	Chris Christie (R)	Other	Undecided
Public Policy Polling (D) (Note: Poll sponsored by VoteVets.org, which supports Kim.)	September 26–27, 2023	565 (V)	–	24%	27%	41%	8%

Bob Menendez vs. generic Republican

Poll source	Date(s) administered	Sample size	Margin of error	Bob Menendez (D)	Generic Republican	Other	Undecided
Public Policy Polling (D)	September 26–27, 2023	565 (V)	–	20%	42%	25%	13%

Andy Kim vs. Chris Christie

Poll source	Date(s) administered	Sample size	Margin of error	Andy Kim (D)	Chris Christie (R)	Other	Undecided
Public Policy Polling (D)	September 26–27, 2023	565 (V)	–	46%	20%	23%	10%

Andy Kim vs. generic Republican

Poll source	Date(s) administered	Sample size	Margin of error	Andy Kim (D)	Generic Republican	Other	Undecided
Public Policy Polling (D)	September 26–27, 2023	565 (V)	–	44%	32%	5%	18%

Generic Democrat vs. generic Republican vs. Bob Menendez as an Independent

Poll source	Date(s) administered	Sample size	Margin of error	Generic Democrat	Generic Republican	Bob Menendez (I)	Undecided
Emerson College	March 26–29, 2024	1,000 (RV)	± 3.0%	49%	42%	9%	–

=== Debates ===
During the first debate, about six minutes after the discussion began, Bashaw appeared to freeze for several seconds. Kim approached Bashaw and tried to help him with the moderators, eventually sending the debate into a ten-minute commercial break. The debate returned with Bashaw present; he explained that he had not eaten all day but felt better, and the debate resumed without further interruption.

2024 United States Senate general election in New Jersey debates
No.	Date	Host	Moderators	Link	Democratic	Republican
Key: P Participant A Absent N Non-invitee I Invitee W Withdrawn						
Key: P Participant A Absent N Non-invitee I Invitee W Withdrawn					Kim	Bashaw
1	October 6, 2024	New Jersey Globe	Laura Jones		P	P
2	October 15, 2024	NJ Spotlight News	Briana Vannozzi & David Cruz		P	P
3	October 22, 2024	News 12 New Jersey	Eric Landskroner		P	P

=== Results ===
2024 United States Senate election in New Jersey
Party	Candidate	Votes	%	±%
Democratic	Andy Kim	2,161,491	53.61%	−0.40%
Republican	Curtis Bashaw	1,773,589	43.99%	+1.16%
Green	Christina Khalil	45,443	1.13%	+0.34%
Libertarian	Kenneth Kaplan	24,242	0.60%	−0.07%
Vote Better	Patricia Mooneyham	17,224	0.43%	N/A
Socialist Workers	Joanne Kuniansky	9,806	0.24%	N/A
Total votes		4,031,795	100.00%	N/A
Democratic hold				

==== By county ====
County	Andy Kim Democratic		Curtis Bashaw Republican		Various candidates Other parties		Margin		Total votes cast
County	#	%	#	%	#	%	#	%	Total votes cast
Atlantic	58,942	48.22%	60,859	49.79%	2,429	1.99%	-1,917	-1.57%	122,230
Bergen	224,775	52.54%	192,452	44.98%	10,607	2.48%	32,323	7.56%	427,834
Burlington	134,884	60.80%	83,225	37.52%	3,722	1.68%	51,659	23.29%	221,831
Camden	156,445	65.35%	79,545	33.23%	3,418	1.43%	76,900	32.12%	239,408
Cape May	20,096	38.93%	30,905	59.87%	616	1.19%	-10,809	-20.94%	51,617
Cumberland	25,186	48.24%	25,441	48.73%	1,583	3.03%	-255	-0.49%	52,210
Essex	216,580	72.22%	75,420	25.15%	7,887	2.63%	141,160	47.07%	299,887
Gloucester	80,034	50.23%	77,303	48.51%	2,012	1.26%	2,731	1.71%	159,349
Hudson	135,615	65.23%	64,050	30.81%	8,239	3.96%	71,565	34.42%	207,904
Hunterdon	34,983	45.37%	40,273	52.24%	1,843	2.39%	-5,290	-6.86%	77,099
Mercer	105,685	67.52%	46,932	29.98%	3,907	2.50%	58,753	37.54%	156,524
Middlesex	188,482	55.00%	140,676	41.05%	13,544	3.95%	47,806	13.95%	342,702
Monmouth	151,920	44.13%	185,197	53.80%	7,112	2.07%	-33,277	-9.67%	344,229
Morris	127,727	47.54%	135,636	50.49%	5,289	1.97%	-7,909	-2.94%	268,652
Ocean	109,610	35.41%	197,040	63.66%	2,883	0.93%	-87,430	-28.25%	309,533
Passaic	91,719	49.30%	86,654	46.58%	7,655	4.11%	5,065	2.72%	186,028
Salem	12,561	40.90%	17,338	56.46%	809	2.63%	-4,777	-15.56%	30,708
Somerset	95,344	55.67%	71,652	41.84%	4,272	2.49%	23,692	13.83%	171,268
Sussex	29,959	36.42%	49,734	60.46%	2,571	3.13%	-19,775	-24.04%	82,264
Union	138,186	62.18%	79,183	35.63%	4,855	2.18%	59,003	26.55%	222,224
Warren	22,758	39.04%	34,074	58.45%	1,462	2.51%	-11,316	-19.41%	58,294
Totals	2,161,491	53.61%	1,773,589	43.99%	96,715	2.40%	387,902	9.62%	4,031,795

County that flipped from Republican to Democratic

- Gloucester (largest municipality: Washington Township)

County that flipped from Democratic to Republican

- Cumberland (largest municipality: Vineland)

==== By congressional district ====
Kim won nine of 12 congressional districts.

District	Kim	Bashaw	Representative
1st	61.1%	37.5%	Donald Norcross
2nd	44.0%	54.3%	Jeff Van Drew
3rd	56.2%	41.9%	Andy Kim (118th Congress)
3rd	56.2%	41.9%	Herb Conaway (119th Congress)
4th	37.2%	61.5%	Chris Smith
5th	50.9%	46.7%	Josh Gottheimer
6th	54.0%	42.5%	Frank Pallone Jr.
7th	48.1%	49.7%	Tom Kean Jr.
8th	63.7%	32.6%	Rob Menendez
9th	51.0%	45.2%	Nellie Pou
10th	75.4%	21.7%	LaMonica McIver
11th	53.8%	43.8%	Mikie Sherrill
12th	61.6%	35.2%	Bonnie Watson Coleman

==== By state legislative district ====
State legislative district results

Kim won 27 of 40 state legislative districts, including three with Republican state senators. Bashaw won 13 districts, including one held by a Democrat.

District	Kim	Bashaw	State senator
1st	44%	54%	Mike Testa
2nd	50%	48%	Vincent J. Polistina
3rd	47%	51%	John Burzichelli
4th	52%	46%	Paul D. Moriarty
5th	66%	32%	Nilsa Cruz-Perez
6th	65%	34%	James Beach
7th	67%	31%	Troy Singleton
8th	53%	46%	Latham Tiver
9th	37%	62%	Carmen Amato
10th	38%	61%	James W. Holzapfel
11th	52%	46%	Vin Gopal
12th	39%	59%	Owen Henry
13th	42%	56%	Declan O'Scanlon
14th	57%	41%	Linda R. Greenstein
15th	74%	23%	Shirley Turner
16th	56%	41%	Andrew Zwicker
17th	66%	29%	Bob Smith
18th	57%	41%	Patrick J. Diegnan
19th	53%	43%	Joe F. Vitale
20th	65%	33%	Joseph Cryan
21st	53%	45%	Jon Bramnick
22nd	63%	35%	Nicholas Scutari
23rd	45%	53%	Doug Steinhardt
24th	39%	59%	Parker Space
25th	49%	49%	Anthony M. Bucco
26th	46%	52%	Joseph Pennacchio
27th	66%	31%	John F. McKeon
28th	88%	10%	Renee Burgess
29th	72%	25%	Teresa Ruiz
30th	31%	67%	Robert W. Singer
31st	66%	30%	Angela V. McKnight
32nd	70%	26%	Raj Mukherji
33rd	60%	37%	Brian P. Stack
34th	71%	26%	Britnee Timberlake
35th	58%	37%	Nellie Pou
36th	50%	47%	Paul Sarlo
37th	64%	33%	Gordon M. Johnson
38th	51%	46%	Joseph Lagana
39th	48%	49%	Holly Schepisi
40th	45%	52%	Kristin Corrado

== Notes ==
Partisan clients
