= New Jersey Firefighters Mutual Benevolent Association =

Labor union in the New Jersey

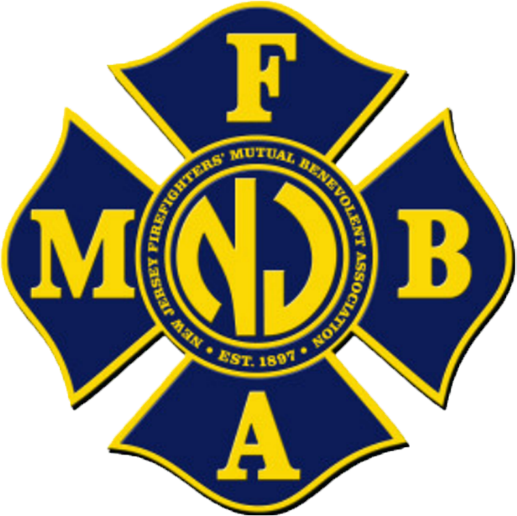
- Logo of the FMBA
- Abbreviation: FMBA
- Founded: 1897; 129 years ago
- Type: Labor union
- Headquarters: 1447 Campbell Street, Rahway, New Jersey, U.S. 07065
- Members: 6,500+ (2026)
- Key people: Eddie Donnelly, President
- Affiliations: Independent union
- Website: www.njfmba.org

The New Jersey Firefighters Mutual Benevolent Association (FMBA) is a labor union representing paid full-time firefighters and emergency medical services personnel in the U.S. state of New Jersey. Established in 1897, the organization is New Jersey's largest independent union for career fire and emergency services personnel. The union advocates for labor rights, public safety legislation, retirement benefits, and workplace wellness.

== History ==
The New Jersey Firefighters Mutual Benevolent Association (FMBA) was established at the first annual convention on December 11, 1897, in Jersey City, New Jersey, by six original member locals: Jersey City, Paterson, Hoboken, Newark, Trenton and Camden. By 1907, the union had grown to 12 local chapters. As of 2026, the FMBA has over 6,500 members and 107 locals across every county in New Jersey.

== Leadership ==
The New Jersey Firefighters Mutual Benevolent Association is headquartered in Rahway, New Jersey. The FMBA is led by an elected president, currently Eddie Donnelly since 2013. As of 2025, the union has over $1.7 million in assets and accrues approximately $2 million in annual revenue.

== Political advocacy ==
Described by the New Jersey Globe as "a prominent player in state politics," the FMBA frequently endorses political candidates in New Jersey, and operates a political action committee (PAC). The union endorsed First Lady Tammy Murphy in the 2024 United States Senate election in New Jersey. FMBA endorsed Mikie Sherrill in the 2025 gubernatorial election. The union endorsed Joseph N. DiVincenzo Jr. for Essex County Executive in 2026.

== See also ==
- Uniformed Firefighters Association
- International Association of Fire Fighters
- Firefighters Association of the State of New York
