= Curtis Bashaw =

American real estate developer

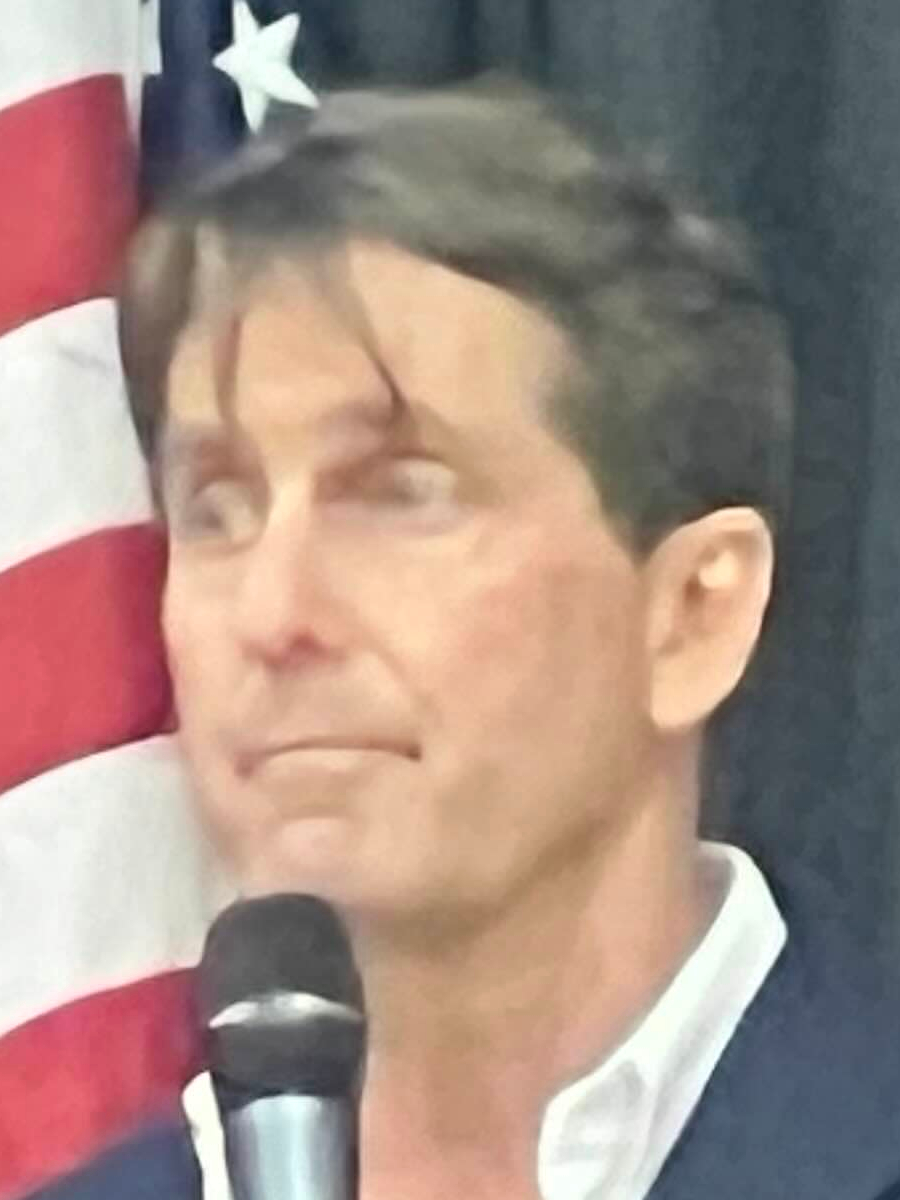
- Bashaw in 2024

Member-elect of the Cape May County Board of County Commissioners
- Assuming office January 2027
- Succeeding: Melanie Collette; Will Morey

Personal details
- Born: April 21, 1960 (age 66) Camden County, New Jersey, U.S.
- Party: Republican
- Education: Wheaton College (BS); University of Pennsylvania (MBA)

Curtis Bashaw (born April 21, 1960) is an American politician and real estate developer, who was the Republican nominee for Senate in 2024 which was vacated by former Democratic senator Bob Menendez following his resignation. He lost the general election to U.S. representative Andy Kim. In 2026, he was elected to the Cape May County Board of County Commissioners.

== Early life and career ==
Bashaw grew up in Cherry Hill, New Jersey. His father, Keith Bashaw, was an attorney, CPA and real estate developer. His grandfather, Carl McIntire, was a fundamentalist minister. As a youth, Bashaw spent summers in Cape May, New Jersey after McIntire developed sections as a religious community. Bashaw worked in Congress Hall as a teenager and managed the center the summer before his senior year at Wheaton College (Illinois).

In 1986, with his father's assistance, Bashaw purchased and restored the Virginia Hotel. Bashaw attended The Wharton School for an MBA during the restoration and graduated in 1990. When McIntire's business empire declared bankruptcy in 1990, Bashaw demolished and sold off Christian Admiral to pay off debts, and raised $22 million to buy and restore Congress Hall.

In 2004, New Jersey Governor Jim McGreevey appointed Bashaw to be the executive director of the Casino Reinvestment Development Authority. Bashaw worked on projects to revitalize Atlantic City's boardwalk area. Bashaw also advised McGreevey through his coming out and resignation.

Bashaw opened the Chelsea Hotel in Atlantic City in 2008. As of 2012, Bashaw's company employed over 1,500 people at five hotels in Cape May, including Congress Hall, the Virginia Hotel, the Star, and the Sandpiper Beach Club. He opened Beach Plum Farm to guests in 2018.

== 2024 U.S. Senate campaign ==
In 2024, Bashaw announced he would run for the Senate as a Republican. The incumbent, Bob Menendez, had been indicted on corruption charges. Bashaw won in the Republican primary. Bashaw touted his business experience and campaigned as a moderate who was a political outsider. Bashaw won 44% of the vote, losing to Democrat Andy Kim who had 54% of the vote.

== Cape May County Board of County Commissioners ==
On January 12, 2026, Bashaw announced that he would be running for the Cape May County Board of County Commissioners alongside North Wildwood mayor Patrick Rosenello. The incumbents, Melanie Collette and Will Morey, both retired. Bashaw and Rosenello were elected on November 3, 2026.

== Personal life ==
Bashaw is gay. As of 2024, he is married to Will Riccio. They met in 2002.

Party political offices
Preceded by Bob Hugin	Republican nominee for U.S. Senator from New Jersey (Class 1); 2024	Most recent
