= Incumbency advantage for appointed U.S. senators =

Incumbency is a researched and debated topic in political science. However, research on appointed U.S. senators and the incumbency advantage is less voluminous. In this research, the relationship between the number of months served as an appointed U.S. senator and the percentage of the vote the appointed senator receives in their initial election is studied. It is hypothesized that the longer an appointee has served before an election, the higher percentage of the vote that appointee will receive.

Data was compiled from the United States Congressional archives of appointed U.S. senators, the percentage of vote those senators received in the election after their appointment, and the number of months between their appointment and election. Discovering a relationship between months served and vote percentages received will add to the scholarship of incumbency, and how political science views appointed U.S. senators.

== The literature ==
According to conventional political science, the greatest advantage a U.S. senator has is incumbency. However, it is uncertain if the advantage held by elected senators extends to those who are appointed.

Several studies examine the incumbency advantage; David R. Mayhew’s Congressional Elections: The Case of the Vanishing Marginals is one. Peter Tuckel has written two articles: "Length of Incumbency And the Reelection chances of U.S. Senators" and "The Initial Re-Election Chances of Appointed & Elected United States Senators". Other books are Treadmill to Oblivion: The Fate of Appointed Senators by William D. Morris and Rodger H. Marz and The Electoral (Mis)Fortunes of Appointed Senators and the Source of the Incumbency Advantage, by Jennifer A. Steen and Jonathan Koppell.

=== Mayhew ===
In Congressional Elections: The Case of the Vanishing Marginals, Mayhew compiled House seat swing data from 1956 to 1972 and wondered if House members receive more benefits from federal programs. He suggests that they have become more skilled at taking positions on issues, possibly due to an increase in polling technology and resources. His study explains that incumbency becomes an advantage due to experience.

=== Tuckel ===
Tuckel examined incumbency in "Length of Incumbency and the Reelection Chances of U.S. Senators" and "The Initial Re-Election Chances of Appointed & Elected United States Senators". He found that 24 percent of senators who are appointed remain in office, compared to 65.4 percent of those who are elected. Excluding appointed incumbents who relinquish their role voluntarily, Tuckel wrote that 56.5 percent of appointees win an election; 76 percent of elected office holders are reelected. He also suggested that the reason for the difference in electoral chances between appointed and elected senators is the amount of experience.

=== Morris and Marz ===
In Morris and Marz's Treadmill to Oblivion: The Fate of Appointed Senators, voters tend to see appointed senators as illegitimate; this weakens the power of incumbency. None of the nine appointed senators who stood for election were victorious, and seven of their nine successful opponents had more political experience. Morris and Marz conclude that Senate appointees cannot make effective reelection efforts while doing committee work and conducting other Senate business for less than one term.

=== Steen and Koppell ===
In The Electoral (Mis)Fortunes of Appointed Senators and The Source of Incumbency Advantage, Steen and Koppell suggest two often-overlooked factors in the incumbency advantage: incumbents are reelected because of qualities they had before they were elected the first time, and reelected incumbents have successfully honed their skills and connections. The incumbency advantage is due more to previous election than to holding the office.

== Sources ==
=== Journals and reports ===
- Mayhew, David R., "Congressional Elections: The Case of the Vanishing Marginals." Polity 6.3 (1974): 295–317.
- Morris, William D., and Roger H. Marz. "Treadmill to Oblivion: The Fate of Appointed Senators." Publius 11.1 (1981): 65–80.
- Steen, Jennifer A., and Jonathan GS Koppell. "The Electoral (Mis)Fortunes of Appointed Senators and the Source of Incumbency Advantage." Yale School of Management: 1-32.
- Tuckel, Peter. "Length of Incumbency and the Reelection Chances of U.S. Senators." Legislative Studies Quarterly 8.2 (1983): 283–88.
- Tuckel, Peter. "The Initial Re-Election Chances of Appointed & Elected United States Senators." Polity 16.1 (1983): 138–42.

=== Databases ===
- Office of the Clerk of the U.S. House of Representatives. Web. 03 Mar. 2011. .
- "Art & History Home People Senators Appointed Senators." U.S. Senate. Web. 23 Dec. 2010. .
