= Tammy Murphy =

American activist and former First Lady of New Jersey

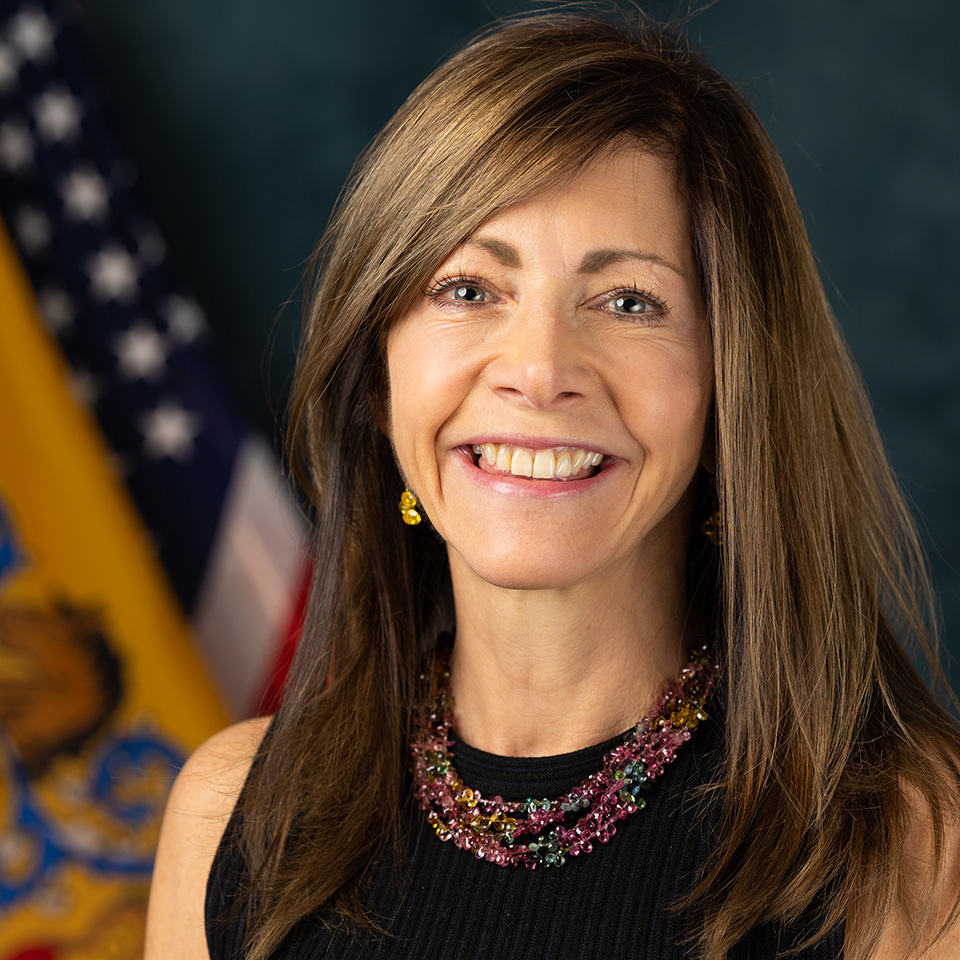
- Official portrait, c. 2023

First Lady of New Jersey
- In role January 16, 2018 – January 20, 2026
- Governor: Phil Murphy
- Preceded by: Mary Pat Christie
- Succeeded by: Jason Hedberg (as first gentleman)

Personal details
- Born: Tammy Snyder; August 5, 1965 (age 61) Virginia Beach, Virginia, U.S.
- Party: Republican (before 2014); Democratic (2014–present)
- Spouse: Phil Murphy (m. 1993)
- Children: 4
- Education: University of Virginia (BA)

Tammy Murphy (née Snyder; born August 5, 1965) is an American political figure, activist, and financier who was the first lady of New Jersey from 2018 to 2026. A member of the Democratic Party, she was an unsuccessful candidate in the 2024 United States Senate election in New Jersey to replace Bob Menendez. She co-owns the professional women's soccer team Gotham FC with her husband, former New Jersey governor Phil Murphy, and chairs the organization.

== Early life and education ==
Tammy Murphy was born Tammy Snyder in Virginia Beach, Virginia. Her father, Edward, and mother, Jean, a British immigrant and former fashion model, owned what New York magazine described as an "empire" of car dealerships. Edward Snyder was Jewish.

Murphy attended boarding school at Phillips Academy Andover, graduating in 1983. She graduated from the University of Virginia in 1987 with a Bachelor of Arts in Communications and English.

== Career in finance (1987–1994) ==
After graduating college, Murphy went to work in finance as an analyst for Goldman Sachs in the real estate department from 1987 to 1989. She left Goldman at the age of 24 to work mainly at Investcorp in London for three years, from 1990 to 1993, but quit at the age of 27 "to marry Mr. Murphy in 1994 and move to Frankfurt, Germany, where he was working at the time." She has not "worked outside the home" since marrying. As of 2023, Murphy "describes herself as a homemaker on tax forms."

== Gotham FC ==
Murphy and her husband are the founders and part owners of Gotham FC, a professional women's soccer team. They founded the team in 2007. Murphy serves as the club's chair.

In 2018, media outlets reported that the team was "plagued by poor housing, subpar facilities, and mismanagement." In 2024, Politico reported that Murphy had been criticized because "the women's soccer team she and her husband co-own, Gotham FC, was found [...] to have provided poor living and playing conditions, prompting Murphy to become more hands-on with the club."

Responding to the women's soccer team allegations, Murphy said that she and her husband were unaware of the players' conditions and allegations of abuse. After she became aware of the report detailing these allegations, Murphy "took a more active role in the team, renaming it Gotham FC and moving the players to Red Bull Arena in Harrison commencing a turnaround that culminated in the team's 2023 championship victory."

== Nonprofit and private school work ==
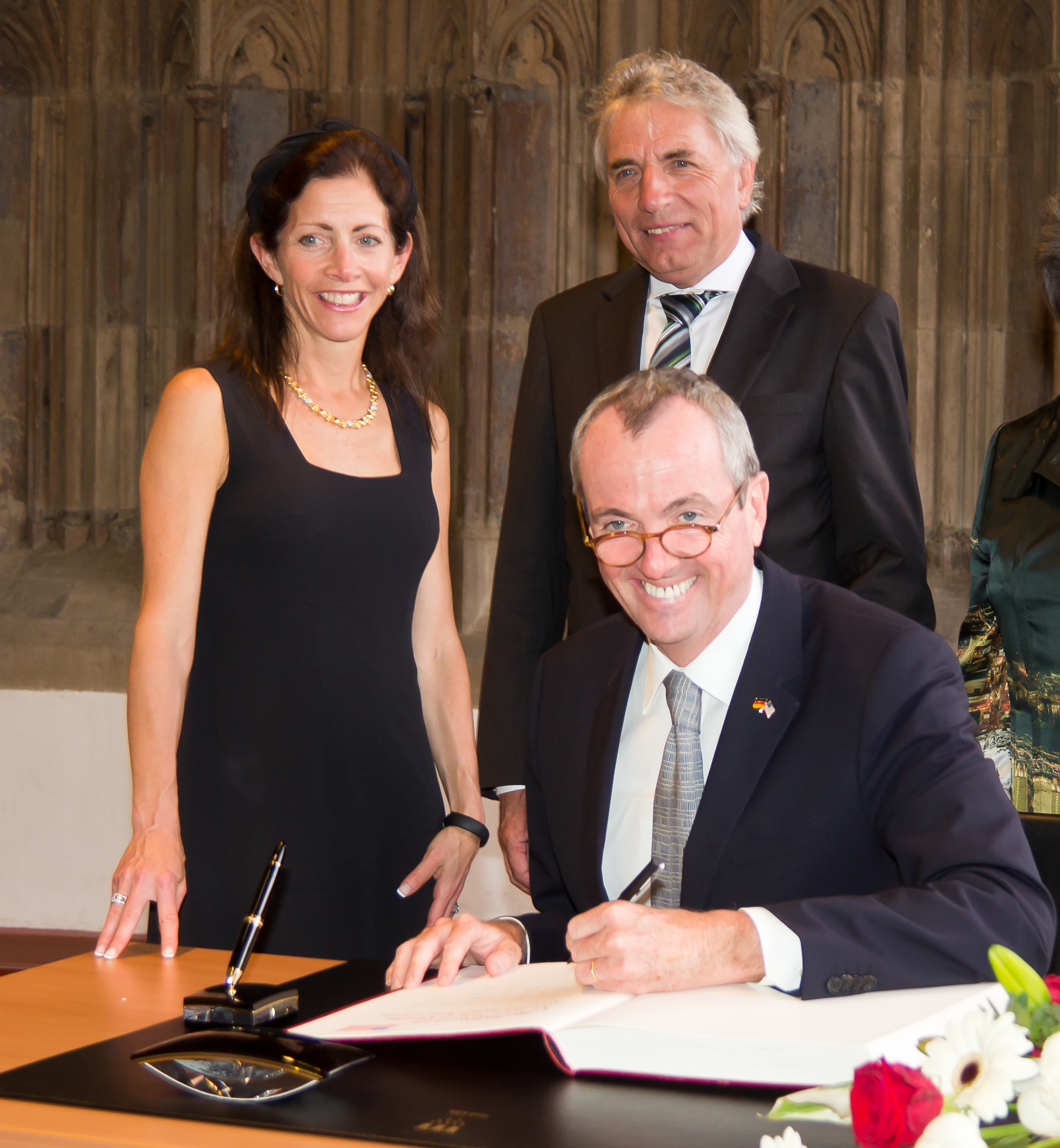
Murphy and Cologne, Germany Mayor Jürgen Roters watch in 2013 as Murphy's husband signs a guest book as the U.S. ambassador to Germany

Murphy has sat on the boards of her children's schools, the private Rumson Country Day School and the boarding school Phillips Andover, as well as on that of the Count Basie Center for the Arts, among others. While her husband was working as the United States ambassador to Germany from 2009 through 2013, Murphy, according to her biography, chaired meetings, gave speeches, and hosted meals and receptions to help further develop the German-American relationship. Murphy was appointed to the University of Virginia Board of Visitors in 2015.

In 2014, in the run-up to Phil Murphy's campaign launch, she and her husband founded New Start New Jersey, a think tank to help "grow the middle class and jumpstart the economy in the state" that she chaired. It ceased operations in 2017 following his election and no longer maintains its research information.

== Political involvement ==
=== Early political activities ===
Murphy grew up in a Republican family and continued to vote as a registered Republican in primary elections until 2014. She donated to George W. Bush's presidential campaigns in 2000 and 2004, as well as to Rick Lazio's Senate campaign against Hillary Clinton in 2000. Murphy has given to more than 300 candidates and committees since 2000, including Bush, Lazio, and the New Jersey Republican Party. She has also made donations to Democratic candidates, including Al Gore, Hillary Clinton, and Bob Torricelli. Politico and The New York Times have described Tammy Murphy as a "prolific fundraiser" for party leaders in the Democratic Party.

Sources differ as to when Murphy became a Democrat. At a televised debate on February 18, 2024, Murphy stated she has been a Democrat "for ten years." Previously, Murphy, notwithstanding her primary voting record up to 2014 as a Republican, stated that she changed political parties in the mid-2000s based on her stances on issues such as abortion, gun control, and the environment. At a candidate forum at the County College of Morris in January 2024, she addressed the fact that she was previously a registered Republican due to her upbringing in a "moderately conservative" small-business family in Virginia and was always seeking GOP candidates who shared her values in education, the environment, and reproductive freedoms. "But over the years, I ran out of room," she said. "I realized I was a Democrat."

Her husband, Phil Murphy, became the Democratic National Committee's finance chair in 2006 and U.S. Ambassador to Germany in 2009. Following a large donation by the Murphys, Al Gore recruited her to be a founding member of the environmental group The Climate Reality Project. Al Gore has called Tammy Murphy "one of the smartest, most articulate, most committed environmental advocates that I've ever run across."

Murphy served as one of New Jersey's 14 presidential electors for Joe Biden in the 2020 presidential election.

=== Work on husband's 2017 gubernatorial campaign ===
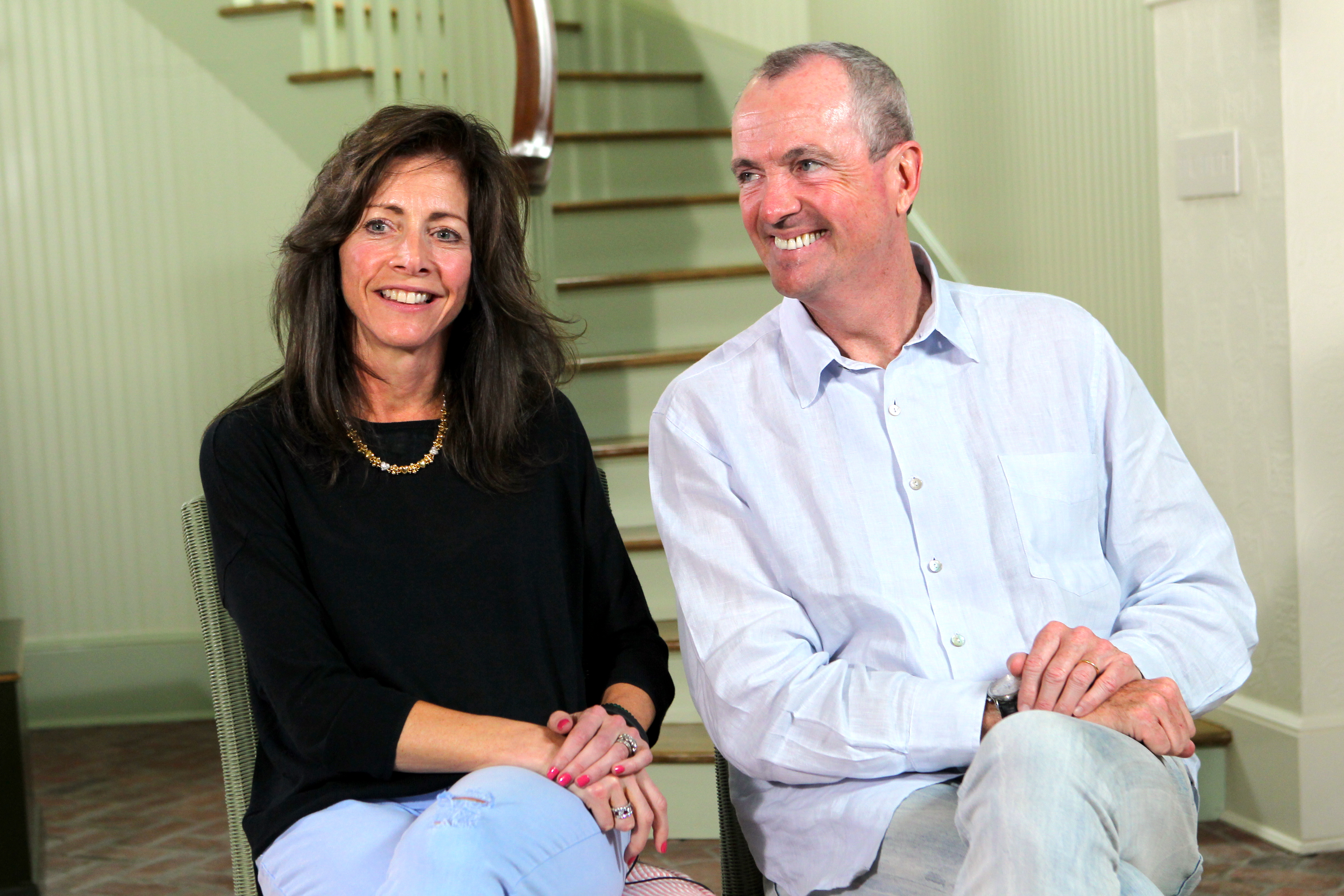
Murphy and her husband in 2016, during his gubernatorial campaign

Murphy was active in her husband's 2017 campaign for Governor of New Jersey. Phil called her his de facto finance chair." Murphy chaired their "issue advocacy" committee, New Start New Jersey and Phil spent $20 million on his campaign. She also participated in campaign events with and without her husband. Phil Murphy was elected governor on November 7, 2017, and sworn into office on January 16, 2018.

A November 2023 Politico report discussed how multiple women accused Phil Murphy's 2017 campaign, which Tammy Murphy helped run, of being a "toxic" environment for women, including campaign strategist Julie Roginsky and campaign volunteer Katie Brennan. A young woman, Julia Fahl, the future mayor of Lambertville, New Jersey, was in the room when an angry male staffer threw a chair; Fahl subsequently referred to the campaign in a statement as "toxic." Roginsky claimed the campaign was the most "toxic" and "misogyny"-filled working environment she had ever experienced, that multiple female staffers complained of misogyny to her, that she was unable to speak out due to a gag order, and that at least one misogynistic slur was shouted at her by a top campaign advisor (a different advisor from the man accused in the Fahl incident). Katie Brennan claimed that a third top campaign staffer had sexually assaulted her, also claiming that she had attempted to tell both Tammy and Phil Murphy, but received no response. A fourth woman who worked on the Murphy transition team also complained of misogyny and stated she experienced a lack of support and immediate retaliatory ostracization, forcing her to quit.

In December 2023, Brennan, then an aide to Governor Hochul, criticized Murphy's failure to act in response to her entreaties. Murphy said that she and her husband were not aware of the allegations until The Wall Street Journal contacted them. In 2024, Murphy told a reporter in response to Brennan's criticisms, "I apologize to her. I feel badly for her because [I also] was sexually assaulted. I had to go to court, and I know exactly how that feels. I get it. Again, though, we are forward-looking, and we pick up the pieces and figure out how to make 1,000 percent certain that we never are replicating something that's hurtful or in any way disrespectful." Murphy had previously spoken about her own experience with having been sexually assaulted in a speech during the 2018 Women's March.

=== First Lady of New Jersey (2018–2026) ===
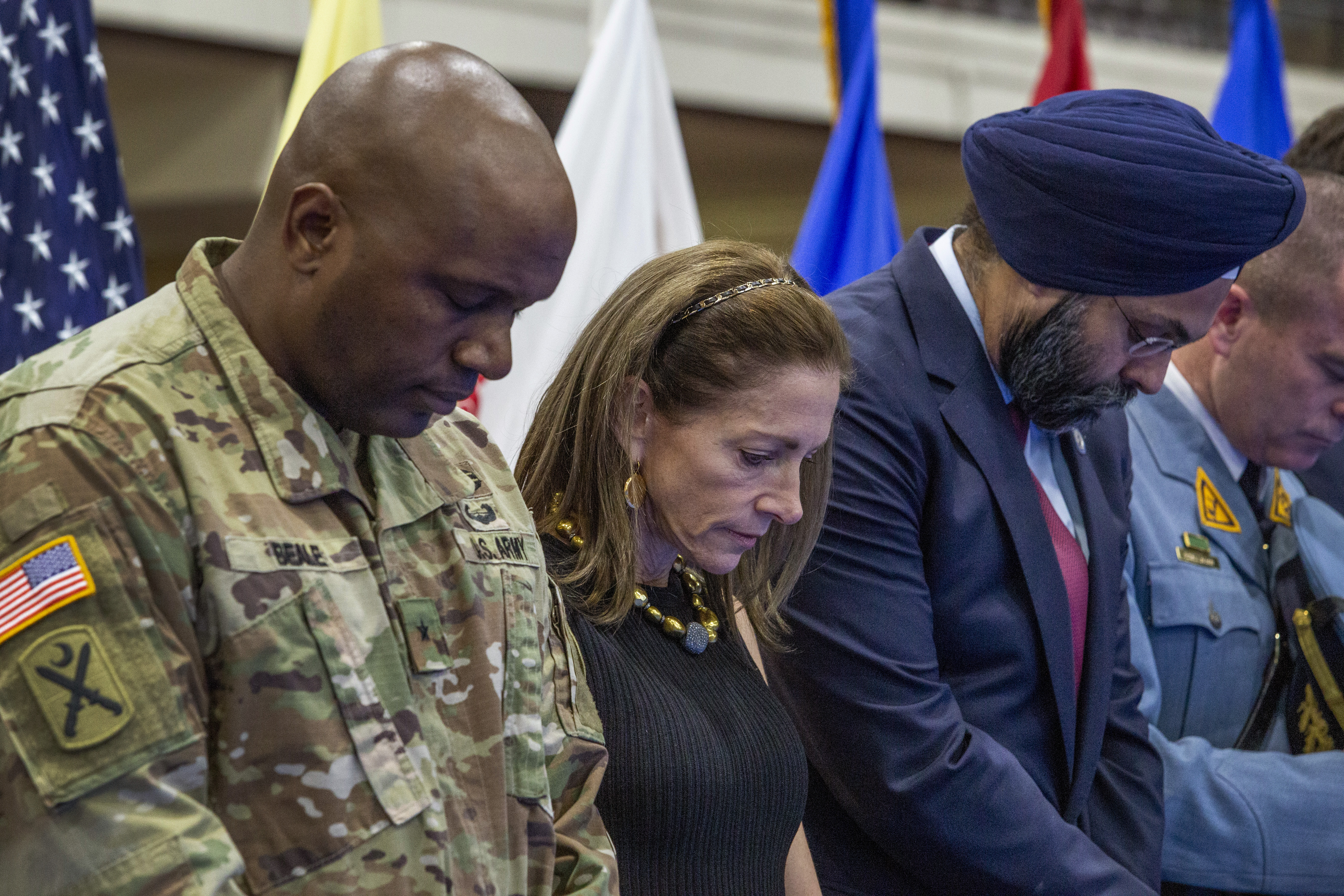
Murphy joins Adjunct General of New Jersey Jemal J. Beale (left) and New Jersey Attorney General Gurbir Grewal (right) at a 2019 event

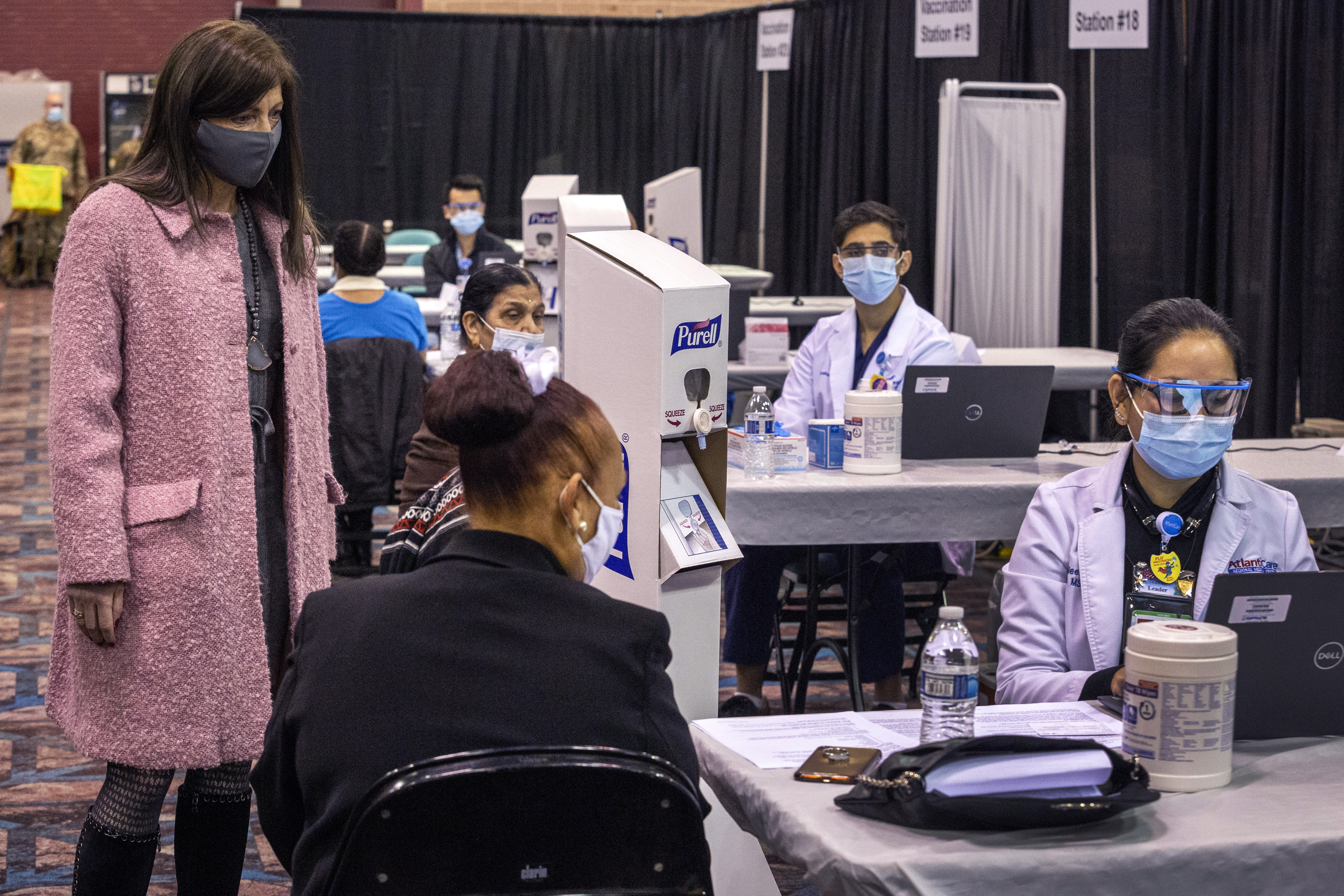
Murphy (left) visiting the COVID-19 vaccine super site at the Atlantic City Convention Center in January 2021

Although she did not receive a salary or hold an official title, Tammy Murphy had acted on a policy portfolio in an unelected capacity. The governor made Murphy the first spouse of a New Jersey Governor to give her own speech at the inauguration. Governor Murphy additionally gave her an office, down the hall from his. Notwithstanding the lack of an official role for first spouse in New Jersey, Governor Murphy has listed his wife on the Office of the Governor's official government website as a member of his administration. The governor had also directed at least one member of his staff to report to Murphy as her chief of staff. NJ.com reported that Tammy Murphy "held a central role" in Governor Murphy's administration, citing anonymous state lawmakers and other political figures who have worked directly with the governor's office.

==== Climate advocacy ====
In 2021, during her husband's gubernatorial term, Murphy was appointed Honorary Chair of the New Jersey Council on the Green Economy. Murphy was influential in global warming/climate change becoming part of school curriculum in New Jersey, making it the first and only state to do so.

==== Maternal advocacy ====
Murphy is known in the state for advocating on behalf of pregnant and postpartum women and their infants. Governor Murphy has named his wife the "founder" of a state-funded entity for maternal health known as Nurture NJ. In 2021, Governor Phil Murphy signed legislation to launch a statewide, universal home visitation program for newborns. This legislation was a "key recommendation" from the Nurture NJ Maternal and Infant Health's Strategic Plan. The governor touted the effectiveness of Murphy's efforts in making New Jersey the second state in the nation to expand Medicaid coverage for women a full year after childbirth, which guaranteed health care for nearly 9,000 mothers across the state. At her U.S. Senate campaign launch, Murphy discussed her initiatives (such as founding, through her personal access to the governor, Nurture NJ) that targeted New Jersey's high maternal mortality rate, especially among minority women. She noted New Jersey's raise from national rankings on maternal death rates.

The Star-Ledger editorial board in July 2023 praised "Tammy Murphy's good work on the maternal health crisis." In December 2023, however, the same editorial board disagreed with Murphy's assertion that New Jersey's maternal mortality rate (and its racial disparities) had seen improvement because of her efforts: "Neither claim is true. We are making slow progress in some areas, and none in others, still lagging behind neighboring states and the nation as a whole on maternal mortality. As for the racial gap, it is as profound as ever." The Ledger also considered Murphy's claim that her initiatives had improved New Jersey's ranking on maternal death misleading, arguing that the change in ranking was more due to worsening outcomes in other states and not a decline in maternal mortality in New Jersey. The editorial also asserted that, while Murphy had made herself a "sturdy advocate" for maternal health, "there is some resentment in the Black community from leaders and advocates who feel pushed aside by the governor's wife, and sometimes ignored," including some Black lawmakers in the state, as well as qualified public health professionals in the field more generally.

According to the New York Times, Murphy was named in a gender discrimination lawsuit by four female troopers against the State Police for allegedly refusing to allow a trooper on the Murphy detail to pump breast milk in a carriage house at the family's $10 million estate in Middletown. The trooper alleged that she had requested permission to pump there given the allegedly dirty status of the security trailer. Allegedly, the first lady refused, saying such use was "not encouraged because of optics by guests who may be on the premises." The trooper alleged she was fired the next day from the coveted executive detail in retaliation (her second day of work after returning from maternity leave). When asked about the lawsuit in an interview, Murphy stated that she could not comment fully on the litigation though it was not filed against her or her husband, stating "Anybody who should imply that I would be in any way, shape, or form discriminatory or not allow a woman to have all the benefits she needs after having delivered a baby or during pregnancy — it's flat-out wrong."

==== Other advocacy as first lady ====
Despite her unelected status, Murphy engaged in brokering political deals, including on energy legislation, appropriations for higher education, and the naming of a highway rest area.

Through her access to the governor, according to a press release, Murphy partnered with the New Jersey Economic Development Authority (NJDEA) to establish a chapter of Golden Seeds, an angel investor firm investing in women-led businesses, in New Jersey.

=== 2024 U.S. Senate campaign ===
On November 15, 2023, Murphy announced her candidacy in the 2024 United States Senate election in New Jersey against incumbent Bob Menendez and Democratic U.S. House Representative Andy Kim. It was her first time running for political office. Murphy's campaign priorities included abortion rights, voting rights, and gun safety. If elected, Murphy would have been the first woman to represent New Jersey in the Senate.

New York opined during Murphy's campaign that her campaign would benefit from her unelected position as first lady, writing, "Murphy can win by behaving like an incumbent, leveraging the possibility of access to officials, programs, and funds."

Murphy had in the past been the chair of a dark money organization called Stronger Fairer Forward to promote the governor's record. Following Murphy's Senate announcement, media and campaign opponents pointed out that Murphy had run this organization and had declined to disclose its donors.

In February 2024, Murphy released a campaign ad filmed in front of National Rifle Association headquarters in which she pledged to support various gun control measures; the Kim campaign then criticized Murphy for donations she had made to the Bush-Cheney 2004 campaign (which had advocated lawsuit immunity for gun manufacturers; Bush signed that immunity into law in 2005). Kim also criticized Murphy for continuing to vote for anti-gun-safety Republican candidates following the Sandy Hook Elementary School shooting in 2012, which killed 28 children and educators.

Early in the campaign, The Daily Beast reported that Phil and Tammy Murphy's blind trust was managed by her brother, Steve Snyder. The publication consulted Gary Altman, a D.C. attorney, who opined that "a blind trust guided by a family member ... won't fly in D.C., [as] the federal Ethics in Government Act ... does not allow a family member to steer an elected official's [trust]," elaborating that "the real-world logic of that is: if your brother is controlling your money, [who would believe] he's not going to tell you how he's investing it?" A Murphy spokesperson responded that "the blind trust ... assures the public that the Governor's decisions are based solely on the public benefit" and "Gov. Murphy and First Lady Tammy Murphy worked with the New Jersey State Ethics Commission to set up a voluntary blind trust that complies with the rules that govern New Jersey elected officials ... [as] she believes strongly in transparency [and] accountability."

==== Endorsements and allegations of nepotism ====
On November 17, 2023, two days after she announced her candidacy, New Jersey congressman Josh Gottheimer endorsed Murphy. Within the following week, Murphy was endorsed by four additional New Jersey Democratic congresspeople — Reps. Frank Pallone, Donald Norcross, Bill Pascrell, and Donald Payne Jr. Media reported on the significance of support from county-level Democratic leadership in the eventual primary. It has been noted that that primary election ballots in all but two New Jersey counties place candidates endorsed by the county's party organization in the county line column of the ballot. On the subject of these Congressional endorsements and the relevance of the so-called county bosses and county machines in the state, New York opined:

The [county line column] is so powerful it can subvert ordinary political hierarchies, such that veteran lawmakers become slavishly indebted to little-known county hacks. When The Daily Beast asked Bill Pascrell why he endorsed Murphy, the 87-year-old U.S. congressman replied, "Do I fight my county chairman?"

On December 22, The New York Times wrote, "No New Jersey legislative incumbent chosen to run on the county line in all of the counties he or she represented has lost a primary election since 2009," suggesting the advantage of, within the first three days of her candidacy, "Ms. Murphy, a first-time candidate with limited experience, ha[ving] lined up backing from Democratic leaders in one-third of the state's counties, representing 56 percent of New Jersey's registered Democratic voters." In the same article, The Times criticized the county line system itself as a form of "voter suppression", and called Murphy's leveraging of it nepotistic, as "six of the seven county leaders who endorsed Ms. Murphy within three days of her entry in the race also have financial incentives to please the governor." A spokeswoman for the Murphy campaign, meanwhile, defended the endorsements, saying, "the first lady was working within the system that exists," and that, "The early endorsements were the result of 'deep relationships she has built' and 'her record'."

On December 21, 2023, the New Jersey state senate president and Union County Democratic chairman Nicholas Scutari endorsed Murphy in the senate race. According to the New Jersey Globe, Murphy had, by then, been endorsed by Democratic county chairs in Bergen, Camden, Essex, Hudson, Middlesex, Passaic, Somerset, and Union counties.

Some anonymous sources privately undermined either their own public endorsement of Murphy or her standing to political reporters, raising concerns of political nepotism motivating their initial endorsement. Similarly, the Washington Post reported that "insiders and members of the state party" anonymously raised concerns about how Murphy received these endorsements.

In January 2024, the New York Times reported on an audio recording that portrayed a staffer for the New Jersey Democratic State Committee calling executives of the College Democrats of New Jersey as they met prior to endorsing Murphy's rival, Andy Kim, in the senate race. Over the course of two hours, the staffer exerted pressure on the college group, offering for Murphy to call them and, eventually, warning that a Kim endorsement could "harm their future job prospects, deprive their organization of ... funding and hurt their odds of being selected as delegates to the Democratic National Convention." The staffer later told the New York Times, "It wasn't coming from a place of threatening at all." The staffer said that the call was to encourage the executive group of the College Democrats of New Jersey to halt an online endorsement vote of a Senate candidate because she did not believe statewide Democratic organizations should pick sides before a primary. A Murphy campaign spokesperson stated that the State Committee staffer's comments were "totally and completely inappropriate, and they in no way represent this campaign or what we stand for," having been "made by a young person with no connection to our campaign." Tammy Murphy, meanwhile, called the College Democrats of New Jersey's vice president to apologize.

==== Suspension of campaign ====
On March 24, 2024, Murphy suspended her campaign for Senate. She said "with Donald Trump on the ballot and so much at stake for our nation, I will not in good conscience waste resources tearing down a fellow Democrat." Her campaign suspension largely cleared the field for Kim in the Democratic primary, as incumbent Menendez announced on March 21 that he would not run in the primary.

A "senior Democratic aide" in politics in the state complained to NJ Advance Media following the suspension that Murphy's campaign "was forced down people's throats in a way that stripped away that pretense [and] in a way that humiliated and enraged the people who do the most work electing Democrats in this state." The aide said that he found Murphy's alleged lack of qualifications "galling," asserting that "there was no reason for this campaign except that she wanted the title and she was the governor's wife and so it belonged to her." In the days after her campaign, at least two prominent New Jersey political commentators (Jeff Tittel, Julie Roginsky) compared the Murphys on social media to the fictional wealthy couple Tom and Daisy Buchanan as described in a famous quote from the 1925 novel in which they appear, F. Scott Fitzgerald's The Great Gatsby.

== Personal life ==
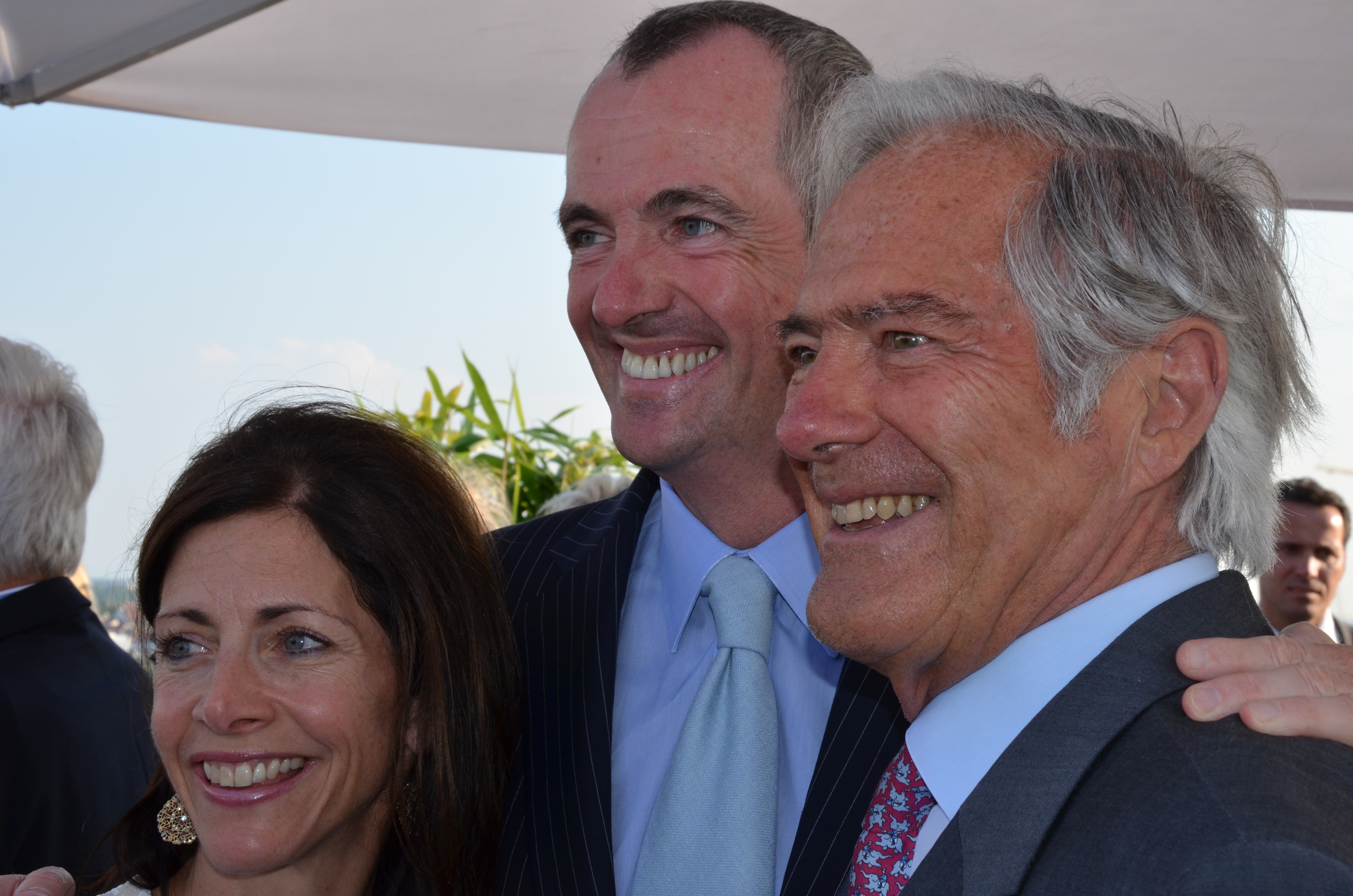
Tammy and Phil Murphy with Roland Berger, 2012

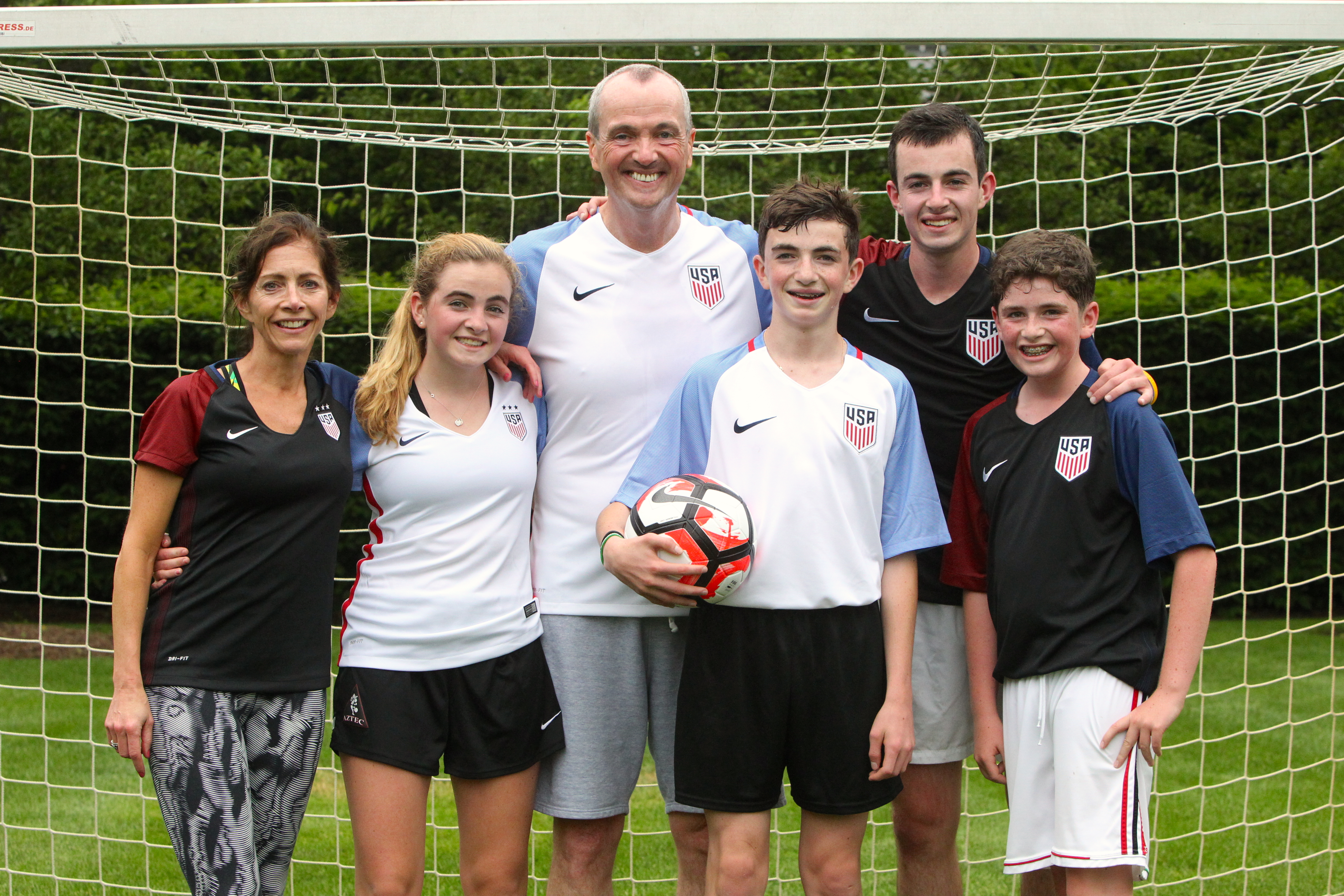
Murphy (far left) with her family in 2016

As a college student in 1987, Murphy met her future husband Phil when he was dating a friend. They met again as employees of Goldman Sachs and their paths crossed a few times, but they did not work closely together. Tammy reached out to Phil in 1993 after the death of his brother and the two had dinner. They were engaged 18 days later and married in six months.

The Murphys have four children. All the family members are soccer fans and they play in family soccer matches. In 2000, the family moved to Middletown Township, New Jersey. They moved to Germany for four years while Phil was serving as ambassador. The Murphys are friends of Jon Bon Jovi and his family, their neighbors in Middletown.

Because Phil Murphy worked at Goldman Sachs until he retired in 2006 and at the time of its IPO, the Murphys are thought to be worth in the range of several hundred million dollars (according to one estimate reported in Der Spiegel in 2009). Other sources give a net worth in the $80 million range. From 2010 to 2018 alone, the couple earned a combined $41.45 million from their investments and entitlements according to NJ Advance Media.

Murphy speaks German and some Italian.
