= Bergen County Board of Commissioners =

Members of the Bergen County, New Jersey government

Leadership
- Chair: Steven A. Tanelli (D)
- Vice Chair: Tracy Sina Zur (D)
- Chair Pro Tempore: Joan Voss (D)

Structure
- Seats: 7
- Political groups: Democratic Party (7)
- Length of term: 3 years

Website
- Bergen County Commissioners

The Bergen County Board of Commissioners (formerly the Bergen County Board of Chosen Freeholders) is a Board of seven people who govern Bergen County, New Jersey alongside the Bergen County Executive. The members are elected at-large to three-year terms of office on a staggered basis with either two or three seats coming up for election each year. At an annual reorganization meeting in the beginning of January, the board elects a Chair, Vice Chair and Chair Pro Tempore from among its members.

== Responsibilities ==
The Board is responsible for creating the laws for Bergen County. Most importantly the Board is responsible for creating and adopting a yearly budget for the county.

== Sessions ==
=== 2026 ===
In 2026, the Board chosen Commissioner Steven A. Tanelli to serve as Chair of the Board, Tracy Silna Zur as Vice Chair, and Dr. Joan M. Voss as Chair Pro Tempore.

=== 2025 ===
In 2025, the Board chose Commissioner Mary J. Amoroso to serve as Chair of the Board, Steven A. Tanelli as Vice Chair, and Dr. Joan M. Voss as Chair Pro Tempore.

=== 2024 ===
In 2024, the Board chose Commissioner Germaine M. Ortiz to serve as Chair of the Board, Mary J. Amoroso as Vice Chair, and Dr. Joan M. Voss as Chair Pro Tempore.

=== 2023 ===
In 2023, the Board chose Commissioner Thomas J. Sullivan to serve as Chair of the Board, Germaine M. Ortiz as Vice Chair, and Dr. Joan M. Voss as Chair Pro Tempore.

=== 2022 ===
In 2022, the Board chose Commissioner Tracy Silna Zur to serve as Chair of the Board, Thomas J. Sullivan as Vice Chair, and Dr. Joan M. Voss as Chair Pro Tempore.

=== 2021 ===
In 2021, the Board chose Commissioner Steven A. Tanelli to serve as Chair of the Board, Tracy Silna Zur as Vice Chair, and Dr. Joan M. Voss as Chair Pro Tempore.

=== 2020 ===
In 2020, the Board chose Commissioner Mary J. Amoroso to serve as Chair of the Board, Dr. Joan M. Voss as Vice Chair, and Steven A. Tanelli as Chair Pro Tempore.

=== 2019 ===
In 2019, the Board chose Commissioner Germaine Ortiz to serve as Chair of the Board, making her the first Latina to do so. This was also the first time that the Board had been entirely led by women: Mary Amoroso serving as Vice Chair and Joan Voss and Chair Pro-tempore.

=== Previous sessions ===
Year	County Executive	Seat 1	Seat 2	Seat 3	Seat 4	Seat 5	Seat 6	Seat 7
2014	Kathleen Donovan (R)	David L. Ganz (D)	Joan Voss (D)	John A. Felice (R)	Maura DeNicola (R)	Steve Tanelli (D)	James Tedesco (D)	Tracy Silna Zur (D)
2015	James Tedesco (D)	David L. Ganz (D)	Joan Voss (D)	John A. Felice (R)	Maura DeNicola (R)	Steve Tanelli (D)	Thomas Sullivan (D)	Tracy Silna Zur (D)
2016	James Tedesco (D)	David L. Ganz (D)	Joan Voss (D)	John A. Felice (R)	Maura DeNicola (R)	Steve Tanelli (D)	Thomas Sullivan (D)	Tracy Silna Zur (D)
2017	James Tedesco (D)	David L. Ganz (D)	Joan Voss (D)	Germaine Ortiz (D)	Mary Amoroso (D)	Steve Tanelli (D)	Thomas Sullivan (D)	Tracy Silna Zur (D)
2018	James Tedesco (D)	David L. Ganz (D)	Joan Voss (D)	Germaine Ortiz (D)	Mary Amoroso (D)	Steve Tanelli (D)	Thomas Sullivan (D)	Tracy Silna Zur (D)
2019	James Tedesco (D)	David L. Ganz (D)	Joan Voss (D)	Germaine Ortiz (D)	Mary Amoroso (D)	Steve Tanelli (D)	Thomas Sullivan (D)	Tracy Silna Zur (D)
2020	James Tedesco (D)	David L. Ganz (D)	Joan Voss (D)	Germaine Ortiz (D)	Mary Amoroso (D)	Steve Tanelli (D)	Thomas Sullivan (D)	Tracy Silna Zur (D)
2021	James Tedesco (D)	Ramon Hache Sr. (D)	Joan Voss (D)	Germaine Ortiz (D)	Mary Amoroso (D)	Steve Tanelli (D)	Thomas Sullivan (D)	Tracy Silna Zur (D)
2022	James Tedesco (D)	Ramon Hache Sr. (D)	Joan Voss (D)	Germaine Ortiz (D)	Mary Amoroso (D)	Steve Tanelli (D)	Thomas Sullivan (D)	Tracy Silna Zur (D)
2023	James Tedesco (D)	Rafael Marte (D)	Joan Voss (D)	Germaine Ortiz (D)	Mary Amoroso (D)	Steve Tanelli (D)	Thomas Sullivan (D)	Tracy Silna Zur (D)
2024	James Tedesco (D)	Rafael Marte (D)	Joan Voss (D)	Germaine Ortiz (D)	Mary Amoroso (D)	Steve Tanelli (D)	Thomas Sullivan (D)	Tracy Silna Zur (D)
2025	James Tedesco (D)	Rafael Marte (D)	Joan Voss (D)	Germaine Ortiz (D)	Mary Amoroso (D)	Steve Tanelli (D)	Thomas Sullivan (D)	Tracy Silna Zur (D)
