= Casino Reinvestment Development Authority =

Governmental agency of New Jersey, US

State of New Jersey Casino Reinvestment Development Authority

Agency overview
- Formed: 1984
- Jurisdiction: New Jersey
- Headquarters: 15 S. Pennsylvania Ave. Atlantic City, NJ 08401
- Agency executives: Modia Butler, Chairman; Sean Pattwell, Executive Director; Maisha Y. Moore, Deputy Executive Director
- Website: http://www.njcrda.com/

The Casino Reinvestment Development Authority or CRDA is a New Jersey state governmental agency that was founded in 1984 and is responsible for directing the spending of casino reinvestment funds in public and private projects to benefit Atlantic City and other areas of the state. From 1985 through April 2008, CRDA spent US$1.5 billion on projects in Atlantic City and US$300 million throughout New Jersey.

Reinvestment funds are received from New Jersey casinos, which are required by law to contribute 1.25% of gross revenue funds toward projects that are approved by the CRDA.

== Composition ==
The CRDA has seventeen members as follows:

=== Four year terms ===
- Six members of the public are appointed by the Governor and confirmed by the Senate
- Two members recommended by the President of the Senate are appointed by the Governor
- Two members recommended by the Speaker of the General Assembly are appointed by the Governor

=== Two year term ===
- Two casino representatives are appointed by the Governor

=== Ex officio ===
- One member of the Casino Control Commission is appointed by the Governor
- The Mayor of Atlantic City
- The State Treasurer
- The Attorney General
- The Commissioner of the Department of Commerce and Economic Development or the Department of Community Affairs, or an additional member of the Casino Control Commission is appointed by the Governor
