= 2025 United States gubernatorial elections =

- November 4, 2025

2 governorships
| | Majority party | Minority party |
|---|---|---|
| Party | Republican | Democratic |
| Seats before | 27 | 23 |
| Seats after | 26 | 24 |
| Seat change | ▼1 | ▲1 |
| Popular vote | 2,867,291 | 3,873,467 |
| Percentage | 42.37% | 57.23% |
| Seats up | 1 | 1 |
| Seats won | 0 | 2 |
- Democratic gain Democratic hold No election

Gubernatorial elections were held in the United States on November 4, 2025, in New Jersey and Virginia. Both states had last elected governors in 2021, with both incumbents being ineligible to seek re-election due to term limits in their respective state constitutions.

In the 2024 United States presidential election, both states voted for Democratic nominee Kamala Harris by a 5-6% margin. New Jersey in particular had a large swing to the right in 2024, with Donald Trump losing the state by only 6%, and had narrowly re-elected Democrat Phil Murphy in 2021, leading some to expect a close race.

Ultimately, Democratic nominees Mikie Sherrill and Abigail Spanberger won their races in New Jersey and Virginia, respectively, by wide margins and outperformed Harris. This is the first time since 1985 where every race in this cycle of governorships was decided by double digits.

== Partisan composition ==
Heading into the election, there were 27 Republican governors and 23 Democratic governors in the United States.

The gubernatorial seats were up in the moderately blue states of Virginia and New Jersey where there was one Republican and one Democratic seat. Republicans were defending one governorship in a state that Kamala Harris won in 2024 (Virginia). Democrats were defending one governorship in a state that Harris won (New Jersey).

== Election predictions ==
Several sites and individuals publish predictions of competitive seats. These predictions looked at factors such as the strength of the incumbent (if the incumbent is running for re-election), the strength of the candidates, and the partisan leanings of the state (reflected in part by the state's Cook Partisan Voting Index rating). The predictions assigned ratings to each seat, with the rating indicating a party's predicted advantage in winning that seat.

Most election predictors use:

- "tossup": no advantage
- "tilt" (used by some predictors): advantage that is not quite as strong as "lean"
- "lean": slight advantage
- "likely": significant, but surmountable, advantage
- "safe" or "solid": near-certain chance of victory

| State | PVI | Incumbent | Last race | Cook Sep. 11, 2025 | IE Aug. 28, 2025 | Sabato Sep. 4, 2025 | SN Sep. 30, 2025 | Result |
|---|---|---|---|---|---|---|---|---|
| New Jersey | D+4 | Phil Murphy (term-limited) | 51.22% D | Lean D | Lean D | Lean D | Likely D | Sherrill; 56.88% D |
| Virginia | D+3 | Glenn Youngkin (term-limited) | 50.58% R | Likely D (flip) | Lean D (flip) | Likely D (flip) | Solid D (flip) | Spanberger; 57.58% D (flip) |

== Race summary ==
| State | Governor | Party | First elected | Status | Candidates |
|---|---|---|---|---|---|
| New Jersey | Phil Murphy | Democratic | 2017 | Incumbent term-limited. Democratic hold. | ▌ ✓ Mikie Sherrill (Democratic) 56.9%; ▌Jack Ciattarelli (Republican) 42.5%; ▌Vic Kaplan (Libertarian) 0.4%; ▌Joanne Kuniansky (Socialist Workers) 0.2% |
| Virginia | Glenn Youngkin | Republican | 2021 | Incumbent term-limited. Democratic gain. | ▌ ✓ Abigail Spanberger (Democratic) 57.6%; ▌Winsome Earle-Sears (Republican) 42.2% |

== New Jersey ==
New Jersey gubernatorial election
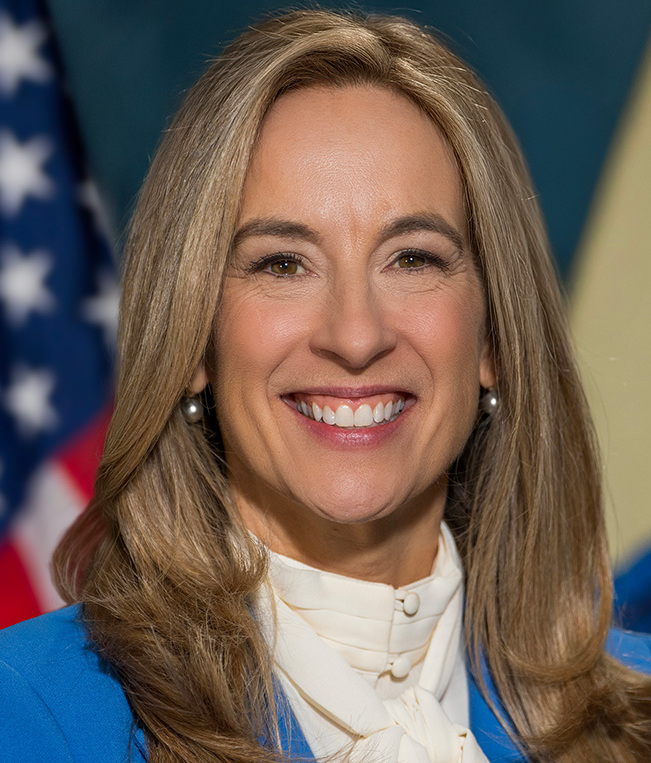

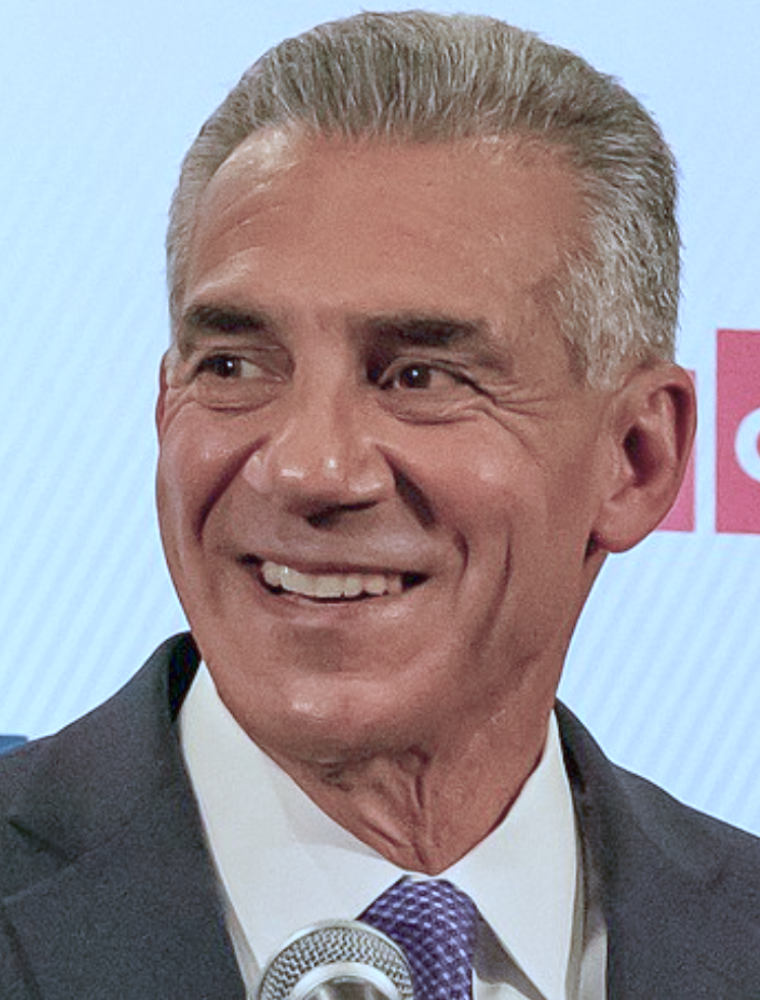
| Nominee | Mikie Sherrill | Jack Ciattarelli |
| Party | Democratic | Republican |
| Running mate | Dale Caldwell | Jim Gannon |
| Popular vote | 1,896,610 | 1,417,705 |
| Percentage | 56.88% | 42.52% |
- County results
Governor before election
Phil Murphy
Democratic
Elected Governor
Mikie Sherrill
Democratic

Governor Phil Murphy was elected to a second term in 2021 with 51.2% of the vote. He was term-limited by the New Jersey Constitution and couldn't seek re-election for a third consecutive term. Jersey City mayor Steven Fulop, former New Jersey Senate president Stephen Sweeney, U.S. Representatives Josh Gottheimer and Mikie Sherrill, and Newark mayor Ras Baraka ran for the Democratic nomination. Ultimately, Sherrill won the Democratic nomination on June 10. Former state Assemblyman Jack Ciattarelli, who was the Republican nominee in 2021, was the Republican nominee.

Sherrill won the election, becoming the second female governor of New Jersey when several media outlets called the race for her over Ciattarelli on November 4, 2025. In addition, she won three consecutive terms for her party for the first time in the state since 1961. Sherrill outperformed expectations after Republicans outperformed in 2021 & 2024, winning by approximately 14 points against Ciattarelli.

New Jersey Democratic primary
| Party | Candidate | Votes | % |
|---|---|---|---|
| Democratic | Mikie Sherrill | 286,244 | 34.02 |
| Democratic | Ras Baraka | 173,951 | 20.67 |
| Democratic | Steven Fulop | 134,573 | 15.99 |
| Democratic | Josh Gottheimer | 97,384 | 11.57 |
| Democratic | Sean Spiller | 89,472 | 10.63 |
| Democratic | Stephen Sweeney | 59,811 | 7.11 |
| Total votes | | 841,435 | 100.00 |

New Jersey Republican primary
| Party | Candidate | Votes | % |
|---|---|---|---|
| Republican | Jack Ciattarelli | 316,283 | 67.82 |
| Republican | Bill Spadea | 101,408 | 21.75 |
| Republican | Jon Bramnick | 29,130 | 6.25 |
| Republican | Mario Kranjac | 12,782 | 2.74 |
| Republican | Justin Barbera | 6,743 | 1.45 |
| Total votes | | 466,346 | 100.00 |

New Jersey general election
| Party | Candidate | Votes | % | ±% |
|---|---|---|---|---|
| Democratic | Mikie Sherrill; Dale Caldwell | 1,896,610 | 56.88% | +5.66 |
| Republican | Jack Ciattarelli; Jim Gannon | 1,417,705 | 42.52% | –5.48 |
| Libertarian | Vic Kaplan; Bruno Pereira | 11,880 | 0.36% | +0.06 |
| Socialist Workers | Joanne Kuniansky; Craig Honts | 8,164 | 0.24% | +0.09 |
| Total votes | | 3,334,359 | 100.0% | |
| Democratic hold | | | | |

== Virginia ==
Virginia gubernatorial election
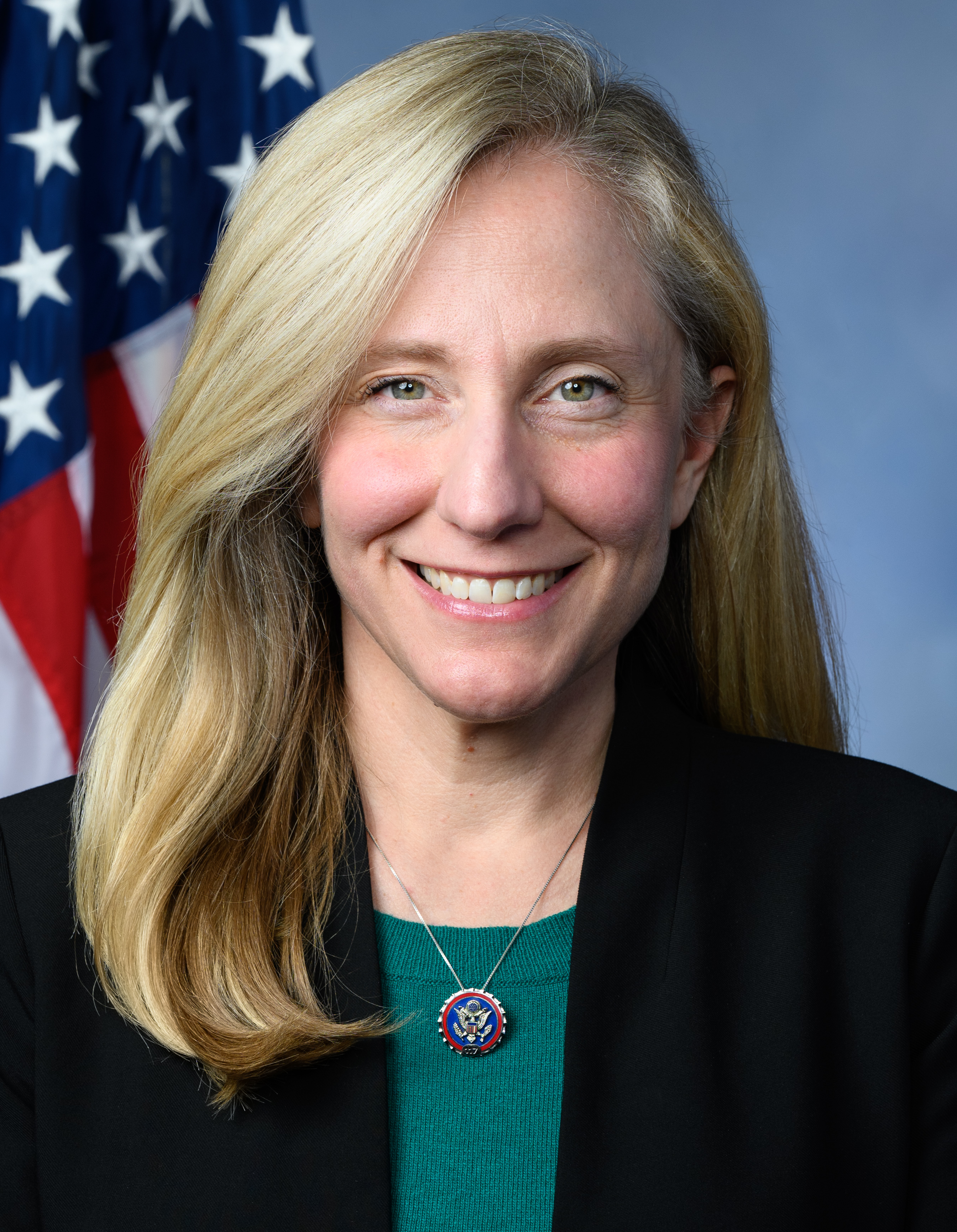

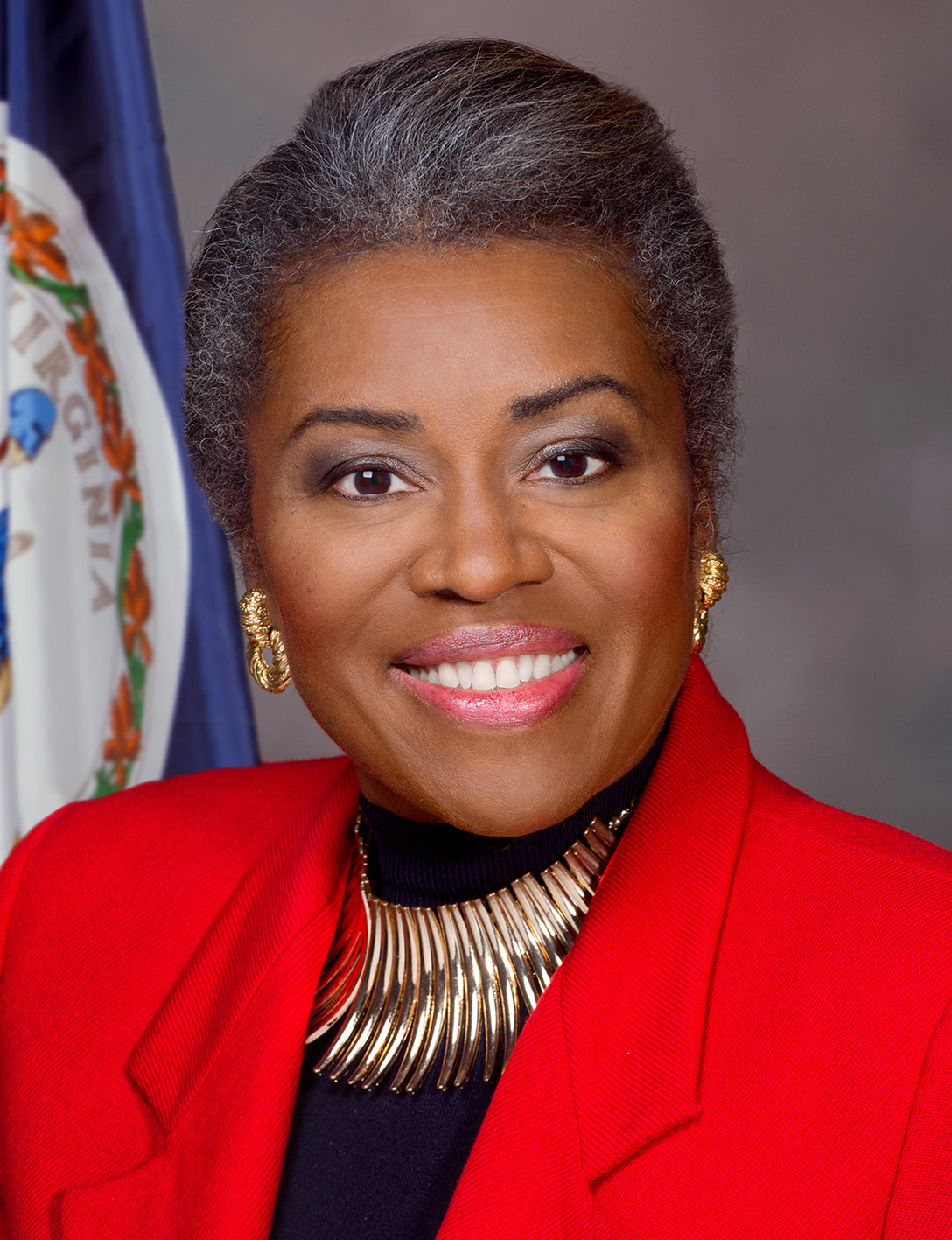
| Nominee | Abigail Spanberger | Winsome Earle-Sears |
| Party | Democratic | Republican |
| Popular vote | 1,976,857 | 1,449,586 |
| Percentage | 57.58% | 42.22% |
- County and independent city results
Governor before election
Glenn Youngkin
Republican
Elected Governor
Abigail Spanberger
Democratic

Governor Glenn Youngkin was elected in 2021 with 50.6% of the vote. He was term-limited by the Virginia Constitution and could not seek election to a second consecutive term. Lieutenant Governor Winsome Earle-Sears was the Republican nominee. Former U.S. Representative for Virginia's 7th congressional district Abigail Spanberger was the Democratic nominee. Both candidates won their respective party’s nominations unopposed. Spanberger won the election by over 15 points, becoming the first female governor in Virginia's history.

Virginia general election
| Party | Candidate | Votes | % | ±% |
|---|---|---|---|---|
| Democratic | Abigail Spanberger | 1,976,857 | 57.58% | +8.94 |
| Republican | Winsome Earle-Sears | 1,449,586 | 42.22% | –8.36 |
| Write-in | | 6,897 | 0.20% | +0.12 |
| Total votes | | 3,433,340 | 100.0% | |
