= Samaya Clark-Gabriel =

American teenage athlete

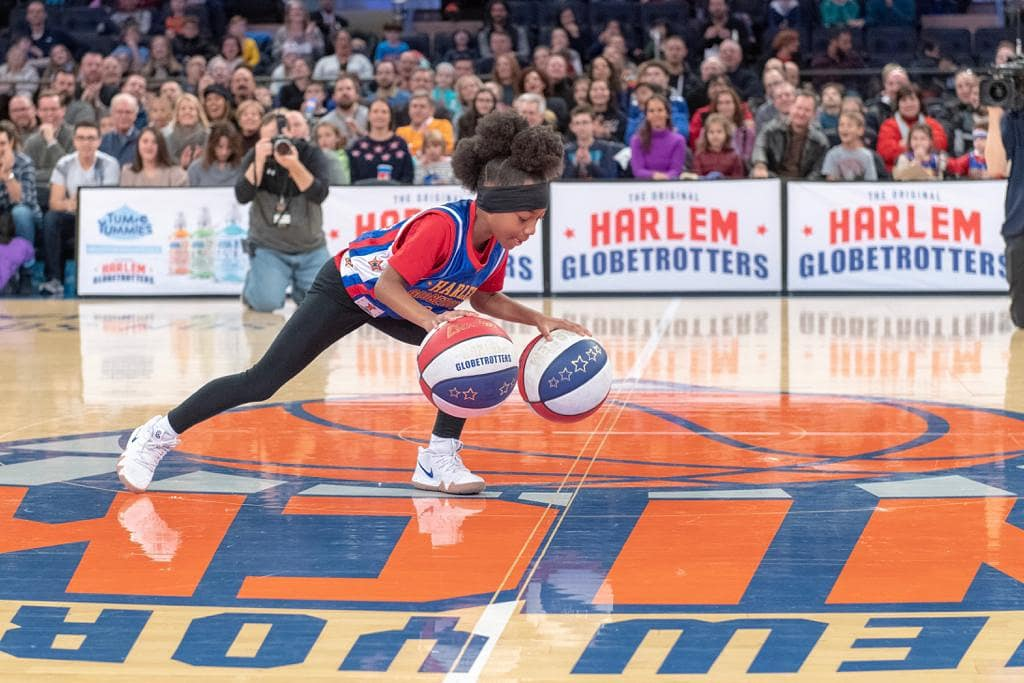
Samaya Clark-Gabriel performing at Harlem Globetrotters game (2019).

Samaya Clark-Gabriel (born October 1, 2009) is an American teenage athlete and actress from Brooklyn, New York, area. She gained recognition for her athletic abilities at the age of four and has also been involved in community and philanthropic initiatives.

== Early life ==
In 2016, Clark-Gabriel helped lead the Brooklyn Stars soccer team to their first championship. She received the Lion's Heart Award for her performances against predominantly male teams. Following her time in soccer, she shifted her focus to basketball.

== Media appearances ==
Clark-Gabriel's basketball skills have been shown on several media platforms, including Good Morning America, GoodDay NY, CBS Sports, USA Today, News 12 Brooklyn, SportsCenter, ESPN, ESPNW, Chasing News, the New York Post, Women You Should Know, The Ben & Pickler Show, Rolling Stone and People.com.

In addition to media features, Samaya has practiced with the New York Liberty Basketball team and has played 1-on-1 with NY Liberty President Isiah Thomas. In January 2018, Samaya became the first child to play alongside The Harlem Globetrotters in a game at Barclays Center, Madison Square Garden, and Nassau Coliseum. Clark-Gabriel and her father were featured on Fatherly social media platforms, where she garnered 2.8 million views and 76,000 shares. She was also featured in a Monday Motivation post by the Olympic Games social media account.

For the 2018 NBA draft, Clark-Gabriel teamed up with Verizon and Vince Carter's Dunk Clinic.

In 2020, Clark-Gabriel was featured on Little Big Shots, starring Melissa McCarthy.

== Acting Debut ==
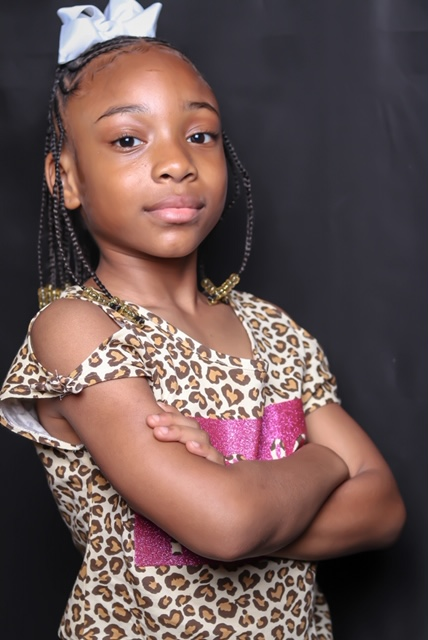
Samaya Clark-Gabriel, age 9.

In 2018, Clark-Gabriel made her acting debut in the indie film titled Foster Sin. The film brings awareness to the mistreatment of children in the foster system.

== Philanthropy ==
Clark-Gabriel raises donations for St. Jude Children's Research Hospital, supporting research towards cures for child cancer and other life-threatening diseases. She was recognized for her efforts by New York Governor Andrew Cuomo.
