= Lily Benavides =

American politician (born 1965)

Member of the New Hampshire House of Representatives from the Hillsborough 17th district
- In office January 3, 2007 – January 3, 2009

Personal details
- Born: 1965 (age 60–61)
- Party: Green (2016-present)
- Other political affiliations: Democratic (before 2007)
- Children: 4

Lily Benavides (born 1965) is an American activist for human rights and immigrant rights. She served as a Democratic member of the New Hampshire House of Representatives from 2007 to 2009, representing Hillsborough District 17. She became independent in 2014 and switched to the Green Party in 2016.

== Political career ==
Benavides was elected to the New Hampshire House in 2006. She was a member of the NH Immigrant Rights Task Force where she fought discrimination against Latinos in New Hampshire. Benavides did not seek re-election in 2008. She endorsed Bill Richardson in the 2008 Democratic Party presidential primaries.

In 2024, Benavides was the Green Party nominee for New Jersey's 11th congressional district, challenging Democratic incumbent Congresswoman Mikie Sherrill. Benavides was initially chosen by Green Party gubernatorial nominee Stephen Zielinski as his running mate for the 2025 New Jersey Gubernatorial Election. However, after Zielinski withdrew from the race due to health issues, Benavides stepped up to replace him as the party's nominee for governor, with software engineer Lisa Ryan as her running mate. Benavides withdrew from the race after she fell below the required 2,000 nomination signatures to be placed on the ballot. However she ran as a write-in candidate.

== Personal life ==
Benavides immigrated to the United States from Colombia 36 years ago. She has four children, eight grandchildren, three cats, a dog, and a gecko.

== Electoral history ==
=== 2024 ===
2024 New Jersey's 11th congressional district election
Party	Candidate	Votes	%
Democratic	Mikie Sherrill	222,583	56.53%
Republican	Joseph Belnome	164,556	41.79%
Green	Lily Benavides	4,780	1.21%
Independent	Joshua Lanzara	1,832	0.47%
Total votes		393,751	100%
