= Mario Kranjac =

American lawyer, venture capitalist, and politician

Personal details
- Born: 1965 or 1966 (age 60–61) Passaic, New Jersey, U.S.
- Party: Republican
- Children: 3
- Education: Fordham University (BA, JD)
- Website: Campaign website

Mario Kranjac (born 1965/1966) is an American lawyer, venture capitalist, and Republican Party politician who served as mayor of Englewood Cliffs, New Jersey, from 2016 to 2024. His tenure as mayor was noted for his strong support of Donald Trump. He was a candidate for Governor of New Jersey in the 2025 Republican primary but did not participate in any organized candidate forums or debates and finished fourth with less than three percent of the vote.

== Early life ==
Kranjac was born in Passaic, New Jersey, and was raised in Clifton, New Jersey, where he attended high school. He graduated from Fordham University's Gabelli School of Business as part of their class of 1987 and from the Fordham University Law School in 1990 and serves on the university's Entrepreneurial Law Advisory Committee. Kranjac initially worked for the law firm Schnader Harrison Segal & Lewis, Kranjac then joined with partners, Kranjac, Manuali & Viskovic LLP, later Kranjac, Tripodi & Partners LLP that specializes in legal services for businesses in domestic and international markets. Kranjac later shifted his profession to join a venture capital firm, co-founding Dynamk Capital.

Kranjac stated that his interest in politics started when he worked for Newt Gingrich on a delegation to Japan, South Korea and China. He was also inspired to enter politics to take on the Parisi family, who, led by Joseph Parisi Sr. and his son, Joseph Parisi Jr., had ruled Englewood Cliffs as mayors for over 40 years, saying "they’ve served too long as mayors and become too wealthy doing it." Shortly after taking office, Kranjac had Joseph Parisi Sr.'s name stripped from the Englewood Cliffs municipal building, with Joseph Parisi Jr. claiming that Kranjac had a "petty and childish" feud with the Parisi family.

== Mayor of Englewood Cliffs ==
Kranjac was elected as the mayor of Democratic-leaning Englewood Cliffs, New Jersey, in 2016 as a Republican, being the first Republican elected mayor in 40 years and would be re-elected in 2020. He self-imposed a two term-limit on himself, but no legislation was passed to codify this. Kranjac has styled himself as a "forever Trumper," (Note: As a riff on the Never Trump movement) earning him the nickname the "Trumpy Mayor" by The Star Ledger which he often uses to describe himself. During his time as mayor he championed legislation to block affordable housing developments across the state. Dubbing affordable housing as a "socialist scheme" he personally led the city to violate housing mandates from governor Phil Murphy leading to a lawsuit that eventually rose to the Bergen County Superior Court, which rebuked Kranjac and deemed that Englewood Cliffs "acted in bad faith" in blocking housing developments.

In response Kranjac stated that Bergen County Court judge Anthony Gallina is biased against him and requesting that the lawsuit against him be moved to another county. The suit, which sought $100 million in damages, was ultimately dismissed as frivolous by the New Jersey Supreme Court who warned other municipal employees that they would face sanctions if other similar suits where filed. Because of his actions not a single unit of affordable housing was built in the municipality for almost a decade and Kranjac's defiance to Murphy and the courts made him a champion of suburban Republicans and Conservatives who claim affordable housing results in higher taxes and lower property values. Detractors, however, claimed that by blocking housing development artificially raises the price of land and properties in Englewood Cliffs and economically segregated the municipality. Kranjac would be censured by the Englewood Cliffs Borough Council three times; for trying to "politicize the council, politicize the affordable housing case, lie to and deceive the residents," for allegedly threatening to punch then-Borough Attorney Albert Wunsch, and for submitting letters to the state pension board about multiple police officers and their pension benefits. He also fought corruption, improved infrastructure, and his pro-business positions attracted companies such as LG Electronics, CNBC, Unilever, and Ferrari North America to make Englewood Cliffs their U.S. headquarters.

In 2019, he joined a revolt against the Bergen County Republican Party due to their support of former County Sheriff Michael Saudino returning to the party after making racist, anti-Asian, sexist, and homophobic comments stating that "There is no place in the Bergen County GOP for someone who spews racist hatred as Mr. Saudino clearly did while Bergen County Sheriff."

== Gubernatorial candidate ==
Mario Kranjac 2025 gubernatorial campaign
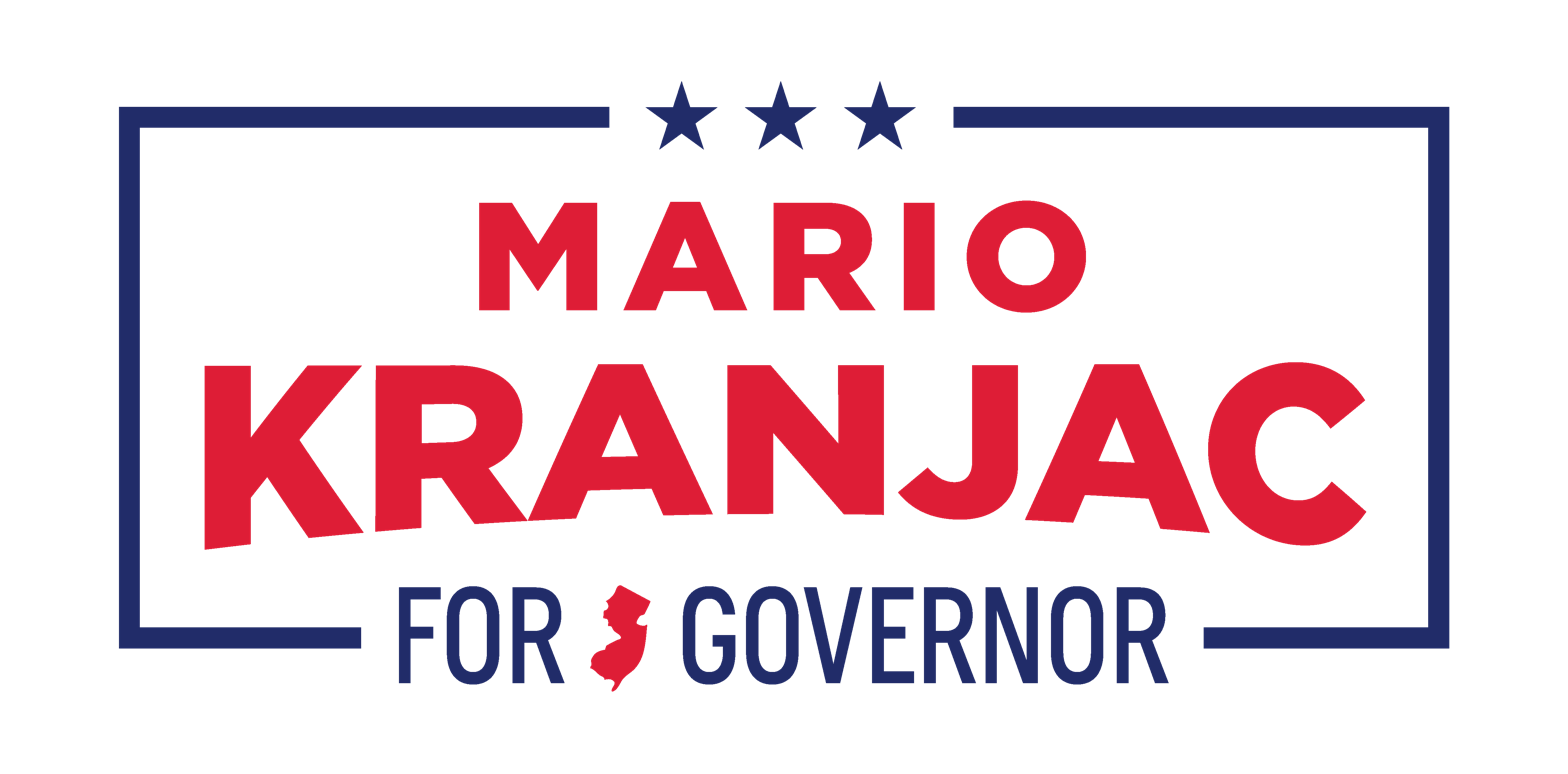
- Campaign: 2025 New Jersey gubernatorial election
- Candidate: Mario Kranjac
- Affiliation: Republican
- Headquarters: Englewood Cliffs
- Slogan: "Make New Jersey Great Again"

Website
- mariomkranjac.com/home

Kranjac's name had been floated as a candidate for governor in 2025 since June 22, 2024 due to his highly visible tenure as mayor. After confirming he would seek the Republican nomination on January 29, 2025, Kranjac officially announced he would be running in the 2025 gubernatorial election on February 4. On February 18 he would be endorsed by Newt Gingrich who said that "Mario has a proven record of winning tough races in a Democrat town." Kranjac announced his platform as to "lower taxes, fight party boss corruption, educate not indoctrinate our kids and enact term limits" and that his top goal as governor would be to cut taxes 2% for each year he’s in office by cutting out waste. He also called himself a "political outsider" and an "unapologetic supporter of President Trump." At an April 2 event hosted by the Rutgers University College Republicans and the Conservative NGO Freedom Bell Coalition, (Note: Established by former New Jersey State Chair of Young Americans for Liberty, Sara Razi, after her graduation.) Kranjac further outlined his platform as seeking to create a "NJ DOGE" to gut state spending and to "Make New Jersey Great Again." He also stated that he had a similar office created during his time as mayor, and that he would introduce legislation to ban abortion if elected governor. Kranjac has also gone on to say he would work to abolish New Jersey's sanctuary cities and work to pass open-carry laws saying that open-carry on the New York Subway would eliminate crime. He has been considered a long-shot candidate since his entry into the race which was largely secured by Jack Ciattarelli, the candidate in 2021, early on.

Despite this Kranjac saw support from ultra conservative elements of the New Jersey Republican Party (NJGOP). Kranjac claimed that he was the only openly “authentic” Trump-centric candidate, and has claimed his candidacy is an internal referendum on Trump's popularity in the NJGOP. Despite this, Kranjac has never met Trump, who has made no comment on his campaign, and instead endorsed front-runner Ciattarelli. He has attempted to emulate Trump's use of nicknames, calling Jack Ciattarelli and Bill Spadea "Spadarelli", claiming that the two have no differences whatsoever, don't stand for anything, and changed their ideology to be more conservative to gain votes. He also stated that he would seek to broadly emulate Trump's governance if elected.

He has spent a considerable amount of his campaign's resources attempting to undercut Spadea as a spoiler candidate, arguing that Spadea is just as much a RINO as Ciattarelli. Support for Kranjac comes at Spadea's expense as he has eaten into a sizable portion of the "MAGA grassroots." In April Spadea would launch a concerted effort to remove Kranjac from the primary's ballot to consolidate the ultra conservative vote by launching a lawsuit that argued Kranjac falsified some of the 2,949 signatures required to cross the threshold of 2,500 to appear on the ballot. Administrative Law Judge Carl Buck III would invalidate 372 of 202 signatures in the first day of review, however, the effort would narrowly fail as the Judge ruled he had 2,535 legitimate signatures. His right to appear on the ballot was confirmed by Secretary of State Tahesha Way. Despite this he hadn't raised the $580,000 needed to qualify for matching funds and a spot on the primary debate stage, which seriously damaged his campaign's chances of going toe to toe with Spadea for the Ultra Conservative vote. Kranjac is largely self-funding his campaign with his salary from his law firm, as well as resources from his venture capital firm. During the debate Kranjac held counter-programming, a virtual town-hall with Gingrich.

On April 5, at a straw poll held by the Morris County Republican Club Alliance Ciattarelli earned 42 votes, while Spadea earned 40, with Kranjac coming in last place with just 4 votes, behind both Jon Bramnick and fringe-outsider Justin Barbera. On April 25, a poll by Rutgers-Eagleton showed Kranjac with 0% in the primaries, however, he and his campaign have denied his consistent near-zero poll numbers, fictitiously claiming he has surged into "double digits" of "10 to 15 points" and that Rutgers-Eagleton is simply a Democratic-biased pollster who hates Trump. An earlier April 14 poll by National Research Inc. showed Kranjac with 3%. On March 3 the Mercer County Republican Party voted to endorse Spadea with 69 votes to Ciattarelli's 59 and 33 votes to Bramnick, with Kranjac receiving 0 votes, at the same time, the Bergen County Republican Party also voted, giving Ciattarelli 48 votes with Kranjac coming in a distant second with 11. A May 10 poll also by Rutgers-Eagleton, showed Kranjac with 2%. He has also used his platform as candidate to further attack Phil Murphy, namely for his COVID-19 response, his refusal to follow federal immigration law, and his hypocrisy for attacking him for refusing to follow Murphy's housing decree.

On May 9 Kranjac personally appealed to the National Right to Life committee about rescinding their endorsement for Spadea, namely due to Spadea not backing the 20-Week Pain Capable Bill. He also said “President Trump fought hard to overturn Roe vs. Wade,” and that “He empowered the States with the ability to finally start building cultures of life and we’re not going to squander that opportunity.” During the May 13 filing, Kranjac reported that he had only raised $103,608 for his bid for governor, with $5,800 from his own finances, and $20,000 from his law firm, and only had $31,365 in cash-on-hand. Despite his endorsement, neither Gingrich, nor any Gingrich-backed PACs, have donated to his campaign. Shortly after Kranjac announced that he would be personally reaching out to Trump about endorsing him, although Trump already endorsed Ciattarelli on the 12th. Spadea's campaign nearly collapsed following Ciattarelli's endorsement by Trump, with Kranjac making a concerted effort to pick up Spadea's die-hard "MAGA-aligned conservatives."

Kranjac ultimately came in fourth place with 2.7% of the vote in the primary, or 12,530 votes behind Bramnick, Spadea, and the winner Ciattarelli, but above Barbera.

== Personal life ==
Kranjac serves on the Boards of the Lavelle Fund For the Blind, Alliance of Guardian Angels and the Institute of Human Ecology of Catholic University. In March 2022 Kranjac joined the board of The Institute of World Politics.

At the time of the announcement of his gubernatorial campaign, Kranjac was married and had three adult children.
