= Bill Spadea =

American businessman and radio host

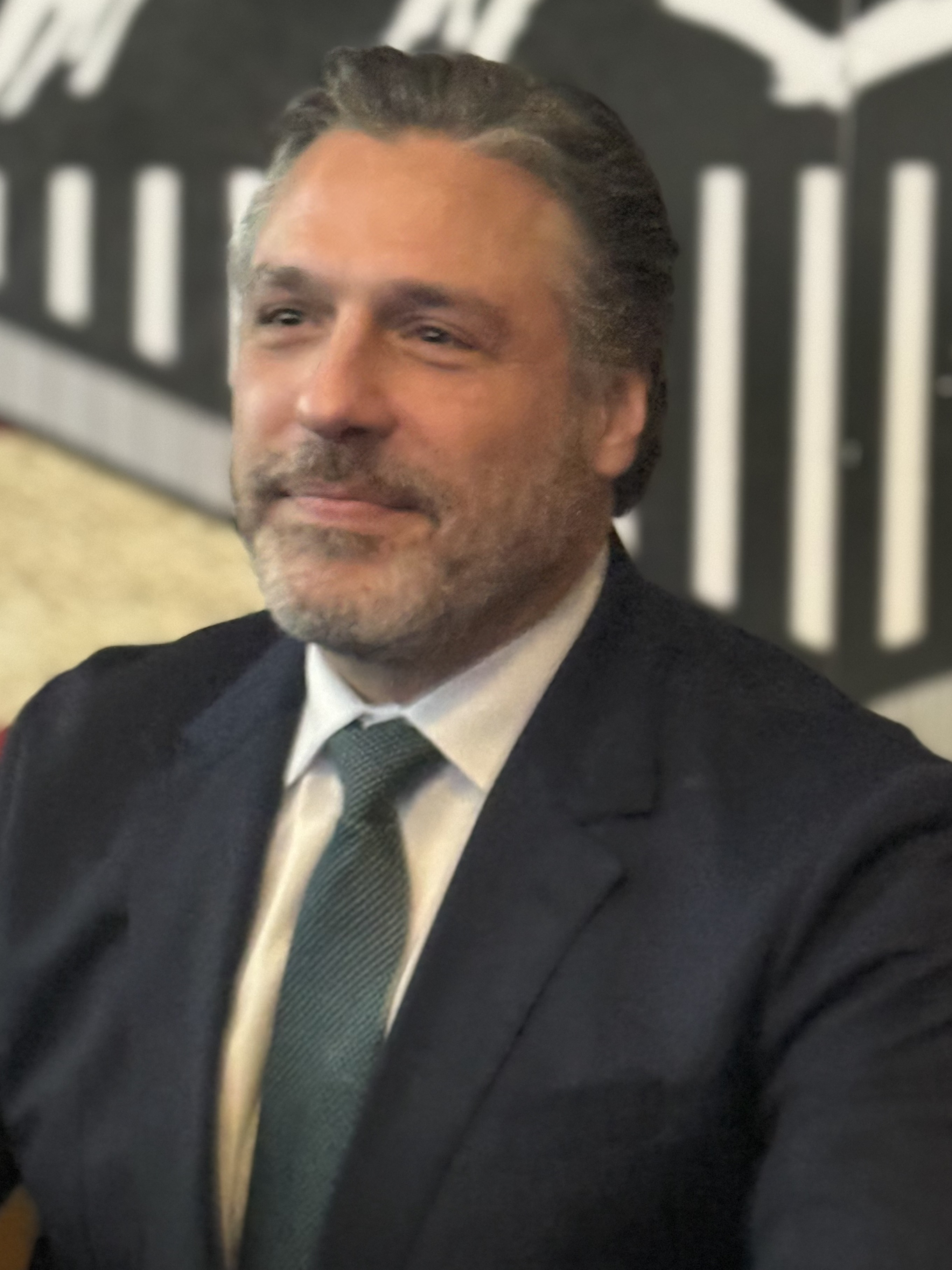
- Spadea in 2025
- Born: March 25, 1969 (age 57); Camden, New Jersey, U.S.
- Education: Boston University (BA)
- Political party: Republican
- Spouse: Jodi Spadea (m. 1994)
- Children: 2
- Website: Official website

William G. Spadea (/speɪdiə/ SPAY-dee-ə; born March 25, 1969) is an American businessman and radio and television host from New Jersey, who is also known for his various right-wing political campaigns in the state. Spadea served as chairman of the College Republican National Committee from 1993–95. He was the Republican nominee for United States Congress in New Jersey's 12th congressional district in 2004, and ran as a Republican for the New Jersey State Assembly in 2012, losing both races. In media, he has been a radio host on New Jersey 101.5 and was the host of Chasing News.

On June 17, 2024, he announced his candidacy for the 2025 New Jersey gubernatorial election. On January 30, 2025, he gave up his radio show on NJ 101.5 to focus on his campaign. Spadea lost the Republican primary election by 40 points to Jack Ciattarelli on June 10, 2025. After his defeat, Spadea returned his radio show on NJ 101.5 on September 2, 2025.

== Early life and background ==
Spadea was born on March 25, 1969 in Camden, New Jersey. His father, Dominick Spadea, was involved in local Camden County politics and unsuccessfully ran for Republican county chairman in 1973, losing by 48 votes to incumbent Henry Leiner.

Spadea graduated from Boston University with a degree in history in 1991. He served as a United States Marine and was honorably discharged in 1999.

== CRNC chairmanship ==
Spadea served as the elected Chairman of the College Republican National Committee (CRNC). During his term, the Republican National Committee discontinued funding for the College Republicans. Spadea began a nationwide program to register students with the CRNC. The use of the standard form for recruitment of College Republicans started during his term from 1993 through 1995 and helped the CRNC to get a grasp on its total membership. He kept contact with the membership through a national newspaper titled the Broadside, which was delivered to tens of thousands of College Republicans across the country. Spadea assisted the hundreds of youth efforts that helped elect a Republican Congress for the first time over 40 years in 1994.

== Political campaigns and career ==
=== 2004 House of Representatives campaign ===
In 2004, Spadea was the Republican nominee for the U.S. House of Representatives in New Jersey's 12th congressional district. During the campaign, he walked 200 miles to each of the 44 towns in the district. He polled over 40% of the vote on Election Day, and was ranked 17th out of 157 GOP challengers nationwide. Spadea’s campaign underperformed the top of the ticket - while George Bush lost by 9%, Spadea lost by 19%.

Spadea was successful in raising more money than any other Republican challenger in New Jersey in 2004.

He was considered a possible candidate for the United States Senate in 2006. Spadea served as a surrogate speaker for former New York City Mayor and presidential candidate Rudy Giuliani in New Jersey.

=== 2012 New Jersey State Assembly campaign ===
In 2012, Spadea ran for the state legislature, running for the 16th District's Assembly seat that was vacant after the death of Assemblyman Peter J. Biondi. In the convention to appoint a replacement, he lost by a three to one margin, earning 52 votes, behind Readington Township Committeewoman Donna Simon with 155 votes. Spadea lost his own hometown of Princeton.

Spadea failed to top 40% of the vote in his first two political campaigns - a trend that would continue in his third campaign.

=== Political organizations ===
Spadea has also started a political action committee called Elect Common Sense, which was announced in 2023. Along with this, he has created an independent expenditure organization named Common Sense Wins, and a nonprofit called the Common Sense Club, in support of conservative policies and "common sense" Republican candidates. Spadea's leadership of the Common Sense Club has been criticized, as the organization contributed less than one percent of the money it raised to support candidates, instead funneling hundreds of thousands into paying Spadea and the consultants who would work on his campaign for governor.

=== 2025 New Jersey Governor campaign ===
Spadea hinted that he would seek the 2025 GOP nomination for NJ Governor in late 2022, and announced in June 2024 that he is running. Spadea debated three other leading candidates in the Republican primary for the gubernatorial race on February 4, 2025. Spadea fought with candidate Jack Ciatterelli over their support for Donald Trump, with both men accusing the other of inconsistent or insufficient support. Ciatterelli gained Trump's endorsement later in the race, and he eventually won the Republican primary on June 10. Spadea lost to Ciattarelli, winning about 22% of the vote - continuing his streak of failing to receiving 40% in his elections for office.

== Broadcasting ==
Beginning in December 2015, Spadea has been the morning drive time host on New Jersey 101.5 (WKXW), replacing long time morning personality Jim Gearhart, while continuing to host the Chasing News television show until its end in 2020. He left the show to run for Governor of New Jersey in January 2025, and returned to the airwaves that September, after losing the 2025 Republican primary. The station announced that Spadea will return to the morning show on Tuesday, September 2, 2025.

== Political positions ==
In June 2018, Spadea advocated for a state constitutional amendment to revoke the Mount Laurel doctrine, arguing the imposition of unnecessary housing development increased tax burdens unfairly. Instead of mandating municipalities to build affordable housing, Spadea advocated for cutting taxes for millionaires in the state, in an effort to attract more millionaires to live in New Jersey.

Spadea was outspoken and critical of the handling of the pandemic by Governor Phil Murphy in New Jersey, specifically the lockdowns and other mandates. Spadea also emceed a December event hosted by the New York Young Republicans whose attendees reportedly included white nationalists.

Spadea has been criticized by some for his on-air advocacy against the need for COVID-19 vaccination and other routine vaccinations in New Jersey. In 2020, Spadea commented on-air that people should stop wearing masks because, "they don't work and make you look stupid," which led to some listeners to file complaints with the FCC. He has been accused of spreading misinformation about the vaccines. Spadea also supported amnesty for illegal immigrants, the creation of user fees for accessing public beaches, increased taxes on families and businesses, and higher tolls.

Spadea was initially a strong supporter of Donald Trump. He changed his position in 2021 - encouraging Trump to resign in shame. Spadea eventually supported Trump again by 2024, after declaring his support for Ron DeSantis and encouraging listeners to contribute to Chris Christie's campaign.

== Personal life ==
From 1999 to 2013, Spadea worked as a corporate vice president for education and career development in the real estate industry for Weichert, Realtors. He lives in Princeton, New Jersey with his wife, Jodi. They have two children.

== See also ==
- List of chairpersons of the College Republicans

Party political offices
Preceded by Tony Zagotta	Chair of the College Republicans; 1993–1995	Succeeded by Joe Galli
