= Chasing News =

2013 American TV program

- Also known as: Chasing News with Bill Spadea
- Genre: News/Talk
- Created by: Dennis Bianchi
- Developed by: Jerry Burke
- Presented by: Bill Spadea
- Country of origin: United States

Production
- Production location: Trenton, New Jersey
- Running time: 27 minutes
- Production company: Fairfax Productions

Original release
- Network: WWOR-TV
- Release: July 8, 2013 – June 18, 2020

Related
- The 10 O'Clock News

Chasing News with Bill Spadea (formerly Chasing New Jersey and Chasing News) was a news and talk show program broadcast by WWOR-TV. The program also aired on another Fox-owned station, WTXF-TV in Philadelphia.

Premiering on July 8, 2013, the program replaced the more conventional newscasts that were previously broadcast by the station. The program featured various segments and stories focusing on headlines and issues affecting the New Jersey area, featuring reports by a group of correspondents known as "chasers".

The program was met with mixed reception upon its premiere for its visually intensive and tabloid-like format, but was praised for how it targeted younger viewers through social engagement. However, the closure of WWOR's news department as part of the changes led to concerns from politicians over whether Fox Television Stations was still in compliance with a mandate to provide news programming for the New Jersey area until its end in June 2020.

== Technology ==
The program was one of the early adopters of cell phone/smartphone news gathering, which was how the show was shot by reporters from the inception of the program in 2013, a very taboo practice in the NY market, now a common practice among news outlets around the country. The show was also a regular user of GoPro cameras, often giving stories a more "along for the ride feel" to the viewer.

== Background ==
WWOR-TV had aired conventional, daily newscasts in some form or another since 1971; most recently, it took the form of a 35-minute newscast, The 10 O'Clock News (previously known as My9 News and UPN 9 News), broadcast on weeknights at 10:00 pm. Since the 2001 purchase of WWOR by Fox Television Stations from Chris-Craft Broadcasting however, FTS had taken to downplaying WWOR's newscasts (and likely would have discontinued them immediately if not for FCC license conditions requiring news and public affairs coverage of New Jersey), to avert any ratings cannibalization from their flagship local newscasts on Fox station WNYW.

On July 3, 2013, Fox announced the immediate cancellation of The 10 O'Clock News, and the July 8, 2013, premiere of Chasing New Jersey. The new program, hosted by local politician Bill Spadea, was billed as a "fast-paced, unpredictable ride across the state of New Jersey" that would feature reports on issues affecting the region by correspondents known as "chasers". The program was produced from a studio in Trenton, New Jersey by Fairfax Productions, a production company owned by Dennis Bianchi—general manager of Philadelphia's Fox O&O WTXF-TV (which also airs Chasing New Jersey at 12:30 am) Fox also registered a series of trademarks for Chasing programs in other cities (and for a national version, Chasing America), indicating that Fox planned to implement the format to its other markets as well.

The transition to Chasing New Jersey resulted in layoffs and reassignments for WWOR staff and personalities; in particular, anchor Brenda Blackmon was assigned to host and produce news specials for the station (she would later leave for WPIX in 2016), while co-anchor Harry Martin, meteorologist Audrey Puente, and sportscaster Russ Salzberg were offered on-air positions at sister station WNYW.

== Reception ==
Diana Marszalek of TVNewsCheck felt that Chasing New Jersey was trying too hard to target itself towards younger viewers with a fast-paced, informal, and visually intensive infotainment format akin to TMZ, but suggested that "with time, Chasing New Jersey could settle down, get its groove and connect with the young viewers that local broadcasters so desperately want. And you have to hand it to the folks behind Chasing New Jersey for doing what they set out to [do]: giving viewers something different." By contrast, fellow writer Harry A. Jessell praised Chasing for being "just the kind of fresh, provocative approach to news that local television is in dire need of", but criticized its production style for being too "frenetic" and "[seeming] scripted and staged" as opposed to TMZ, which he believed felt more "authentic". New Jersey is split almost down the middle between the New York City and Philadelphia markets, and New Jersey residents and politicians had long complained about being "underserved" by the VHF stations in those markets.

Audra Schroeder of The Daily Dot showed similar concerns surrounding its presentation, but noted the show's use of social networking (such as an interview conducted via Google Hangouts, and active social media presences for its personalities) helped to encourage viewer interaction. In comparison to conventional news programming, Schroeder believed that "the TMZ-style approach to hard news might seem like devolution to some, but this shift could actually work. It might actually be necessary."

=== Controversy ===
The replacement of WWOR's traditional newscast with Chasing refueled discussions over whether WWOR was adequately serving the New Jersey market as required by its license. When WWOR's past owner RKO General was faced with the possible revocation of the station's license due a corporate scandal, it successfully lobbied for legislation guaranteeing license renewals for any VHF station which moved into a state without one (such as, at the time, New Jersey). Ever since the station moved its license from New York City to Secaucus in 1982 under the provisions (though for all intents and purposes, it was and still is a New York City station), WWOR has been subject to expanded public service obligations by the Federal Communications Commission, which require the station to serve the New Jersey side of the market with a "higher degree of service" than normally required.

Under the ownership of Fox Television Stations, WWOR came under scrutiny for the quality of its news operation. In 2004, for instance, when Fox floated moving WWOR's operations to WNYW's studio in Manhattan, pressure from Senator Frank Lautenberg and Congressman Steve Rothman (whose district included Secaucus) forced Fox to back down. Rothman argued that WWOR's license specifically required that its main studio be based in New Jersey. Additionally, there were concerns that any move back across the Hudson River would result in WWOR's news department being shut down, or at the very least cut back to the point that it could not adequately cover New Jersey events.

As a result, the renewal of the station's license had been pending from 2007 to 2014. Lautenberg accused the station of failing to meet its public service obligations, misrepresenting the amount of New Jersey-centric programming it airs, and misrepresenting the number of employees who work for the station. The station was also criticized by the media watchdog group Voices of New Jersey for similar reasons, claiming that Fox was making too many budget and staff cuts at the station, and also accusing the company of misrepresenting the number of staff it employs. However, Fox argued that the cutbacks were an economic measure in response to a recent economic downturn.

After Lautenberg's June 3, 2013, death, fellow New Jersey senator Bob Menendez, a resident of nearby Paramus, took up the cause. Following the announcement of Chasing New Jersey, Mernendez sent a complaint to the FCC, asking it to review WWOR's license. In the complaint, Mernendez stated that "rather than add much-needed New Jersey specific programming to their lineup, WWOR instead [chose] to supplant its nightly news segment with a show referred to in news reports as 'like TMZ'.'" Rep. Frank Pallone, who was then in the special election to fill Lautenberg's seat, also called for the revocation of WWOR's license.

WWOR was also criticized for similar reasons by the trade union Writers Guild of America, East (WGA East). Its executive director, Lowell Peterson. stated that "the people of New Jersey deserve a television station that will honor its responsibility to provide thoughtful, professional coverage of the issues facing the state. WWOR should add news programming, not chase it off the airwaves." Seven writers who were members of WGA East were dismissed after the cancellation of WWOR's newscast.
