= 2025 New Jersey gubernatorial election =

- November 4, 2025
- Turnout: 51.44% (▲10.94pp)
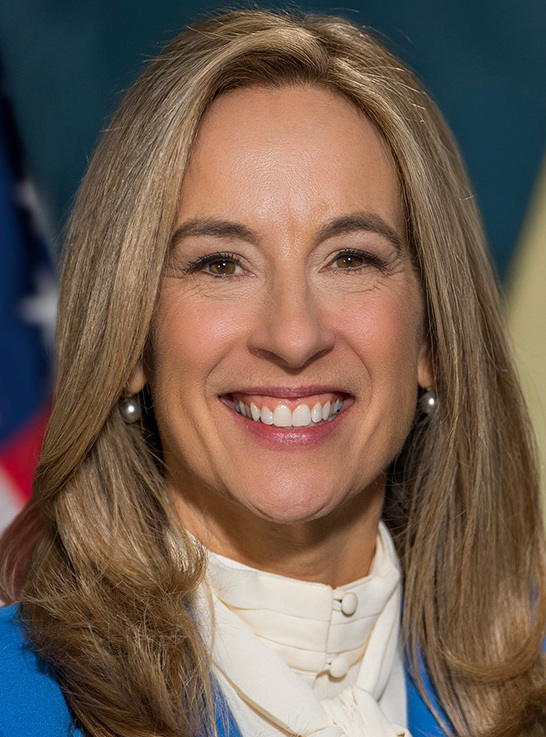

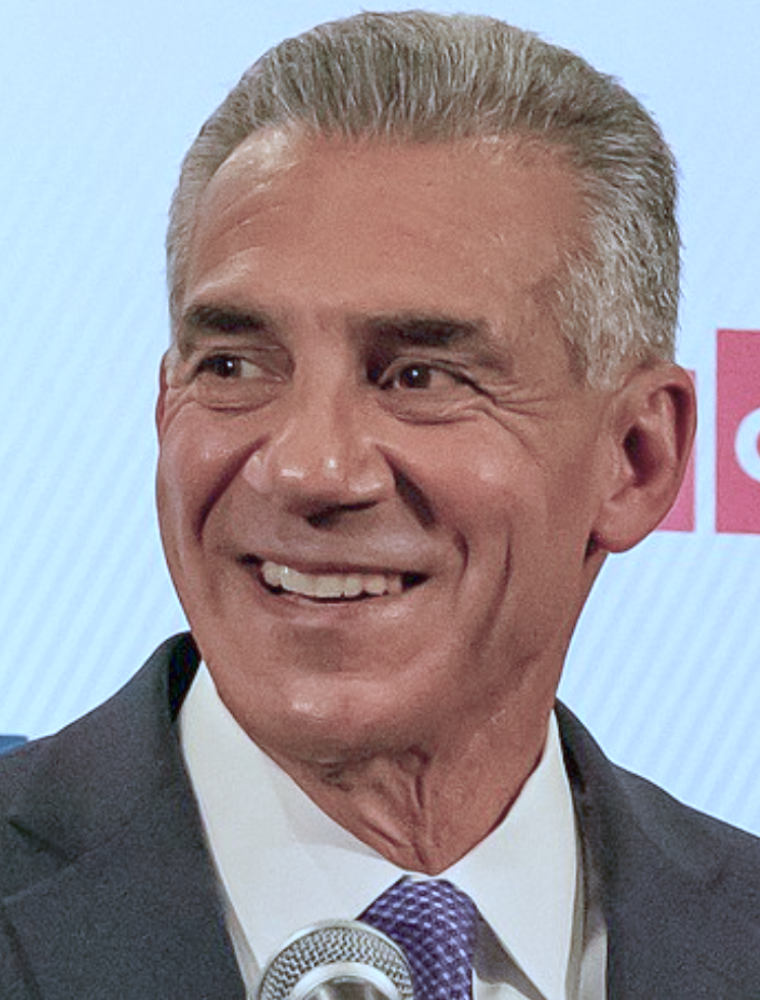
Nominee	Mikie Sherrill	Jack Ciattarelli
Party	Democratic	Republican
Running mate	Dale Caldwell	Jim Gannon
Popular vote	1,896,610	1,417,705
Percentage	56.88%	42.52%
- Sherrill: 40–50% 50–60% 60–70% 70–80% 80–90% >90% Ciattarelli: 40–50% 50–60% 60–70% 70–80% 80–90% >90% Tie: 40–50% 50%
Governor before election
Phil Murphy
Democratic
Elected Governor
Mikie Sherrill
Democratic

The 2025 New Jersey gubernatorial election was held on November 4, 2025, to elect the governor of New Jersey. Democratic U.S. representative Mikie Sherrill defeated Republican former nominee Jack Ciattarelli. Sherrill succeeded Democratic incumbent Phil Murphy, who was term-limited and thus ineligible to seek a third term.

Primary elections were held on June 10, 2025. Sherrill won the Democratic nomination with 34% of the vote over a field of candidates that included Newark mayor Ras Baraka and Jersey City mayor Steven Fulop. Ciattarelli, the Republican nominee in 2021, won his second consecutive nomination with almost 68% of the vote over radio talk show host Bill Spadea.

After strong Republican performances in the state in 2021 and 2024, many analysts expected a close race. Some polls suggested the election was a toss-up. However, Sherrill outperformed expectations and won with a decisive 14.36% margin of victory, slightly larger than Murphy's 14.14% margin in 2017. This election was the widest Democratic margin since 2001, and the highest vote share for a Democratic nominee since 1989. Sherrill was the first Democratic gubernatorial candidate to win Morris County since 1973. Sherrill also lost Hunterdon County by single digits, which is the narrowest Republican margin since 1977. Both Sherrill and Ciattarelli obtained the most votes cast in any New Jersey gubernatorial election, and this election had the highest turnout since 1997.

Sherrill was sworn in as the 57th governor of New Jersey on January 20, 2026. She became the second female governor in New Jersey history, the first Democratic female governor in New Jersey history, and the first female military veteran to serve as governor of a U.S. state. This election was the first New Jersey gubernatorial election since 1961 in which either party won the governorship for three consecutive terms.

== Background ==
New Jersey has long been considered a blue state, consistently voting Democratic at the federal level since 1992 and generally voting Democratic at the state level as well. Republicans have not won a statewide election in New Jersey since the 2013 gubernatorial election, but recent statewide, especially gubernatorial, elections have been notably competitive.

In 2021, Governor Murphy was re-elected by a 3.2% margin, considerably down from his 14.1% margin of victory in 2017. A similar rightward shift was seen at the presidential level in 2024, when Democrat Kamala Harris won New Jersey by 5.9%, considerably down from 2020, when Joe Biden won New Jersey by 15.9%. Harris had the worst performance in New Jersey of any Democratic nominee since 1992, with Donald Trump becoming the first Republican nominee to lose New Jersey by just single digits since 2004.

Most polls, analysts and ratings showed Sherrill to be the favorite, although the polls narrowed beginning in mid-September.

This election was considered to be an indicator of the popularity of Donald Trump's second presidency in the state. Until 2021, New Jersey had elected a governor of the opposite party of the sitting president of the United States in every election since 1989. Until this election, New Jersey had not elected the same party to the governor's office for more than two consecutive terms since 1961.

In October 2025, the Trump administration announced that the Department of Justice would deploy election monitors to polling sites in California and New Jersey ahead of the November 4 elections. The administration cited concerns raised by Republican officials about alleged voting irregularities. Democratic leaders in both states criticized the move as politically motivated voter intimidation, while the department said the monitors would ensure transparency and compliance with federal law.

== Democratic primary ==
=== Candidates ===
==== Nominee ====
- Mikie Sherrill, U.S. representative from New Jersey's 11th congressional district (2019–2025)

==== Eliminated in primary ====
- Ras Baraka, mayor of Newark
- Steven Fulop, mayor of Jersey City and candidate for New Jersey's 13th congressional district in 2004
  - Running mate: Sheena Collum, mayor of South Orange
- Josh Gottheimer, U.S. representative for New Jersey's 5th congressional district (2017–present)
- Sean Spiller, president of the New Jersey Education Association (2021–present) and former mayor of Montclair (2020–2024)
- Stephen Sweeney, former president of the New Jersey Senate (2010–2022) from the 3rd district (2002–2022)

==== Declined ====
- Cory Booker, U.S. senator (2013–present) and candidate for president in 2020 (running for re-election in 2026)

=== Endorsements ===
Ras Baraka

U.S. representatives

- Bonnie Watson Coleman, NJ-12 (2015–present)
- LaMonica McIver, NJ-10 (2024–present)

Statewide officials

- DeForest Soaries, former New Jersey secretary of state (1999–2002) (Republican)
- Regena Thomas, former New Jersey secretary of state (2002–2006)

County officials

- A'Dorian Murray-Thomas, Essex County commissioner (2024–present)
- Donna Pearson, former Cumberland County commissioner
- 2 Mercer County commissioners

Local officials

- Lorenzo Langford, former mayor of Atlantic City (2002–2006, 2008–2014)
- 13 other mayors

Party officials

- Joey Novick, former Hunterdon County Democratic chair

Individuals

- Lawrence Hamm, activist

Labor unions

- Rutgers AAUP–AFT
- SEIU 32BJ
- Workers United Laundry, Distribution and Food Service Joint Board

Organizations

- CAIR Action NJ
- Emgage Action
- Make the Road Action
- New Jersey Citizen Action
- Progressive Change Campaign Committee (co-endorsement with Fulop)
- Sunrise Movement New Jersey
- Working Families Party
Steven Fulop

State legislators

- Angela V. McKnight, senator from LD-31 (2024–present)
- Nicholas Sacco, senator from LD-32 (1994–2024) and mayor of North Bergen (1991–present)
- 9 state assemblymembers

County officials

- Ernest Coursey, Atlantic County commissioner from the 1st district (2014–present)
- Tom Pullion, Burlington County commissioner (2018–present)
- Frank Schillari, Hudson County sheriff (2011–present)

Local officials

- Reed Gusciora, mayor of Trenton (2018–present)
- Eldridge Hawkins Jr., former mayor of Orange (2008–2012)
- Jerramiah Healy, former mayor of Jersey City (2004–2013)
- Bret Schundler, former mayor of Jersey City (1992–2001) (Republican)
- Marty Small Sr., mayor of Atlantic City (2019–present)
- 33 other mayors

Party officials

- Tom Palmieri, former Warren County Democratic chair
- Anthony Vainieri, former Hudson County Democratic chair (Note: Vainieri's endorsement was voided by the election of Craig Guy as Hudson County Democratic chair.)

Individuals

- Matthew Yglesias, journalist (co-endorsement with Gottheimer and Sherrill)

Labor unions

- Amalgamated Transit Union (Note: International and New Jersey State Council)
- American Federation of State, County, and Municipal Employees District 1199J (Note: National Union of Hospital and Health Care Employees District 1199J)
- Hotel and Gaming Trades Council
- 4 International Brotherhood of Teamsters chapters (Note: Brotherhood of Maintenance of Way Employes and Locals 641, 2906, and 3082)
- SMART Transportation Division Local 60

Organizations

- College Democrats of America
- College Democrats of New Jersey
- Progressive Change Campaign Committee (co-endorsement with Baraka)
- SOMA Action

Newspapers

- The Philadelphia Inquirer (Democratic primary only)
Josh Gottheimer

U.S. representatives

- Ed Case, HI-01 (2019–present)
- Jared Golden, ME-02 (2019–present)
- Susie Lee, NV-03 (2019–present)
- Kathy Manning, NC-06 (2021–2025)
- Jared Moskowitz, FL-23 (2023–present)
- Jimmy Panetta, CA-19 (2017–present)
- ~~Albio Sires, NJ-08 (2006–2023) and mayor of West New York (1995–2006, 2023–present)~~ (switched endorsement to Sherrill)
- Tom Suozzi, NY-03 (2017–2023, 2024–present)
- Ritchie Torres, NY-15 (2021–present)

State legislators

- Gordon Johnson, senator from LD-37 (2022–present)
- Joe Lagana, senator from LD-38 (2018–present)
- Paul Sarlo, senator from LD-36 (2003–present)
- ~~Brian Stack, senator from LD-33 (2008–present) and mayor of Union City (2000–present)~~ (switched endorsement to Sherrill)
- Gary Schaer, senator from LD-36 (2006-present)
- 5 state assemblymembers

County officials

- Anthony Cureton, Bergen County sheriff
- ~~Craig Guy, Hudson County executive (2024–present) and Hudson County Democratic chair~~ (switched endorsement to Sherrill)
- John Hogan, Bergen County clerk
- Dennis McNerney, former Bergen County executive (2003–2011)
- Jim Tedesco, Bergen County executive (2015–present)
- 8 Bergen County commissioners

Local officials

- Elie Katz, former mayor of Teaneck (2006–2008, 2016)
- Mark Sokolich, mayor of Fort Lee (2008–present)
- Michael Wildes, mayor of Englewood (2004–2010, 2019–present)
- 30 other mayors

Party officials

- Paul Juliano, Bergen County Democratic chair
- Louis Stellato, former Bergen County Democratic chair

Individuals

- Abraham Foxman, former director of the Anti-Defamation League
- Steven Van Zandt, musician
- Matthew Yglesias, journalist (co-endorsement with Fulop and Sherrill)

Political parties

- Bergen County Democratic Committee
- Warren County Democratic Committee

Labor unions

- International Union of Operating Engineers Local 825
- New Jersey State Council of Machinists

Organizations

- Lakewood Vaad (Democratic primary only)
- American Hindu Coalition

Newspapers

- The Jewish Voice (Democratic primary only)
Mikie Sherrill

U.S. senators

- Elissa Slotkin, Michigan (2025–present)

U.S. representatives

- Jason Crow, CO-06 (2019–present)
- Chrissy Houlahan, PA-06 (2019–present)
- Tom Malinowski, NJ-07 (2019–2023) and Hunterdon County Democratic chair (2024–present)
- Sarah McBride, DE-AL (2025–present)
- Frank Pallone, NJ-06 (1988–present)
- Albio Sires, NJ-08 (2006–2023) and mayor of West New York (1995–2006, 2023–present) (previously endorsed Gottheimer)
- Abigail Spanberger, VA-07 (2019–2025)

Statewide officials

- Richard Codey, former governor of New Jersey (2002, 2004–2006)
- Jon Corzine, former governor of New Jersey (2006–2010)
- Janet Mills, governor of Maine (2019–present)

State legislators

- Linda Greenstein, senator from LD-14 (2010–present)
- John McKeon, senator from LD-27 (2024–present)
- Brian Stack, senator from LD-33 (2008–present) and mayor of Union City (2000–present) (previously endorsed Gottheimer)
- Teresa Ruiz, senate majority leader (2022–present) from LD-29 (2008–present)
- 5 state assemblymembers

County officials

- Thomas Adamo, Passaic County sheriff (2025–present)
- Dan Benson, Mercer County executive (2024–present)
- Joseph N. DiVincenzo Jr., Essex County executive (2003–present)
- Chris Durkin, Essex County clerk (2006–present)
- Craig Guy, Hudson County executive (2024–present) and Hudson County Democratic chair (previously endorsed Gottheimer)
- Danielle Ireland-Imhof, Passaic County clerk (2019–present)
- Amir Jones, Essex County sheriff (2025–present)
- Jack Kemler, Mercer County sheriff (2010–present)
- Juan Rivera, Essex County register of deeds (2020–present)
- Paula Sollami-Covello, Mercer County clerk (2006–present)
- 8 Essex County commissioners
- 3 Mercer County commissioners
- 3 Passaic County commissioners

Local officials

- Andre Sayegh, mayor of Paterson (2018–present)
- 23 other mayors

Party officials

- Janice Mironov, Mercer County Democratic chair and mayor of East Windsor

Individuals

- Billie Jean King, former professional tennis player
- Matthew Yglesias, journalist (co-endorsement with Fulop and Gottheimer)

Political parties

- Essex County Democratic Committee
- Hudson County Democratic Committee
- Hunterdon County Democratic Committee
- Mercer County Democratic Committee
- Middlesex County Democratic Committee
- Monmouth County Democratic Committee
- Morris County Democratic Committee
- Passaic County Democratic Committee
- Sussex County Democratic Committee
- Union County Democratic Committee

Labor unions

- International Federation of Professional and Technical Engineers Local 194
- Laborers' Union
- National Association of Government Employees
- New Jersey Firefighters Mutual Benevolent Association

Organizations

- Elect Democratic Women
- EMILYs List
- Latina Civic PAC
- New Jersey League of Conservation Voters
- Passaic County Young Democrats
- Sierra Club
- With Honor Fund
Sean Spiller

State legislators

- Raymond Lesniak, senator from LD-20 (1983–2018)

Mayors

- Derek Armstead, mayor of Linden, New Jersey (2014–present)

Labor unions

- New Jersey Education Association (candidate's employer)
Stephen Sweeney

U.S. representatives

- Herb Conaway, NJ-03 (2025–present)
- Donald Norcross, NJ-01 (2014–present)

State legislators

- Joe Roberts, former assembly speaker (2006–2010) from LD-05 (1987–2010)
- 6 state senators
- 15 other state assemblymembers

County officials

- Chuck Billingham, Camden County sheriff (2025–present)
- Caren Fitzpatrick, former at-large Atlantic County commissioner (2018–2024)
- James Hogan, Gloucester County clerk
- James Kostoplis, Burlington County sheriff
- Pamela Rosen Lampitt, Camden County clerk (2025–present)
- Carmel Morina, Gloucester County sheriff
- Joseph Ripa, former Camden County clerk
- Joanne Schwartz, Burlington County clerk
- Whip Wilson, former Camden County sheriff (2015–2025)
- 2 Burlington County commissioners
- 6 Camden County commissioners
- 5 Gloucester County commissioners
- 3 Salem County commissioners

Local officials

- 52 mayors

Party officials

- County Democratic chairs for Atlantic, Camden, Cumberland, Gloucester, and Salem

Individuals

- George Norcross, former Democratic National Committee member

Political parties

- Atlantic County Democratic Committee
- Burlington County Democratic Committee
- Camden County Democratic Committee
- Cumberland County Democratic Committee
- Gloucester County Democratic Committee
- Salem County Democratic Committee

Labor unions

- Eastern Atlantic States Regional Council of Carpenters
- International Association of Bridge, Structural, Ornamental and Reinforcing Iron Workers (candidate's employer)
- International Brotherhood of Boilermakers, Iron Ship Builders, Blacksmiths, Forgers and Helpers Local 28
- 5 International Brotherhood of Electrical Workers chapters (Note: Locals 30, 94, 351, 400, and 456)
- International Longshoremen's Association
- New Jersey Roofers Unions
- New Jersey State Building Trades Council
- Sheet Metal Workers New Jersey State Council
- Southern New Jersey Central Labor Council
- Teamsters Joint Council 53
- UNITE HERE Locals 54 & 100
Declined to endorse

U.S. senators

- Cory Booker, New Jersey (2013–present)
- Andy Kim, New Jersey (2024–present)

U.S. representatives

- Rob Menendez, NJ-8 (2023–present)
- Donald Payne Jr., NJ-10 (2012–2024) (deceased)

Statewide officials

- Phil Murphy, governor of New Jersey (2018–2026)
- Tahesha Way, lieutenant governor of New Jersey (2023–present) and secretary of state of New Jersey (2018–present)

State legislators

- Craig Coughlin, assembly speaker (2018–present) from LD-19 (2010–present)
- Nicholas Scutari, senate president (2022–present) from LD-22 (2004–present) and Union County Democratic chair
- Britnee Timberlake, senator from LD-34 (2024–present)

Political parties

- Cape May County Democratic Committee
- Ocean County Democratic Committee

Labor unions

- Communications Workers of America

=== County conventions ===
County convention results

Hunterdon County Democratic convention
Candidate	Round 1		Round 2	
Candidate	Votes	%	Votes	%
Mikie Sherrill	81	45.76%	89	56.69%
Ras Baraka	65	36.73%	68	43.31%
Josh Gottheimer	13	7.35%	Eliminated	
Sean Spiller	11	6.21%	Eliminated	
Stephen Sweeney	7	3.95%	Eliminated	
Total ballots	177 ballots		157 ballots	

Mercer County Democratic convention
Candidate	Round 1	
Candidate	Votes	%
Mikie Sherrill	224	55.45%
Ras Baraka	133	32.92%
Sean Spiller	47	11.63%
Total ballots	404 ballots	

Monmouth County Democratic convention
Candidate	Round 1	
Candidate	Votes	%
Mikie Sherrill	338	72.84%
Ras Baraka	96	20.69%
Sean Spiller	30	6.47%
Josh Gottheimer (Note: Withdrew from participation in this convention but remained on ballot.)	0 (Note: Gottheimer received votes, but they were not announced due to his withdrawal at the convention.)	0.00%
Total ballots	464 ballots	

Sussex County Democratic convention
Candidate	Round 1	
Candidate	Votes	%
Mikie Sherrill	113	88.28%
Ras Baraka	9	7.03%
Stephen Sweeney	6	4.69%
Sean Spiller	0	0.00%
Total ballots	128 ballots (Note: Six ballots were abstentions or voided.)	

Burlington County Democratic convention
Candidate	Round 1	
Candidate	Votes	%
Stephen Sweeney	119	44.57%
Ras Baraka	69	25.84%
Mikie Sherrill	52	19.48%
Sean Spiller	27	10.11%
Total ballots	267 ballots	

Atlantic County Democratic convention
Candidate	Round 1		Round 2	
Candidate	Votes	%	Votes	%
Stephen Sweeney	81	47.36%	90	52.02%
Ras Baraka	38	22.22%	46	26.59%
Sean Spiller	29	16.96%	37	21.39%
Mikie Sherrill	23	13.45%	Eliminated	
Total ballots	171 ballots		173 ballots	

Ocean County Democratic convention (Note: No candidate endorsed, as none received a majority of ballots in the only round of voting)
Candidate	Round 1	
Candidate	Votes	%
Mikie Sherrill	63	38.41%
Stephen Sweeney	31	18.90%
Ras Baraka	26	15.85%
Steven Fulop (Note: These votes were write-ins, as Fulop was not on the ballot.)	23	14.02%
Sean Spiller	21	12.80%
Total ballots	164 ballots	

Bergen County Democratic convention
Candidate	Round 1	
Candidate	Votes	%
Josh Gottheimer	616	66.02%
Mikie Sherrill	148	15.86%
Ras Baraka	95	10.18%
Sean Spiller	45	4.82%
Steve Sweeney	29	3.11%
Total ballots (Note: 41 additional delegates abstained or cast invalid ballots.)	933 ballots	

Morris County Democratic convention
Candidate	Round 1	
Candidate	Votes	%
Mikie Sherrill	385	76.85%
Ras Baraka	88	17.56%
Sean Spiller	20	3.99%
Steve Sweeney	8	1.6%
Total ballots (Note: 23 delegates abstained)	524 ballots	
Turnout	83.71%	

Salem County Democratic convention
Candidate	Round 1	
Candidate	Votes	%
Steve Sweeney	24	82.76%
Ras Baraka	3	10.34%
Mikie Sherrill	2	6.90%
Total ballots	29 ballots	

Warren County Democratic convention
Candidate	Round 1	
Candidate	Votes	%
Josh Gottheimer	19	57.58%
Ras Baraka	7	21.21%
Mikie Sherrill	5	15.15%
Steve Sweeney	2	6.06%
Total ballots	33 ballots	

Essex County Democratic convention
Candidate	Round 1	
Candidate	Votes	%
Mikie Sherrill	438	62.13%
Ras Baraka	236	33.48%
Sean Spiller	24	3.40%
Steve Sweeney	7	0.99%
Total ballots	705 ballots	

Democratic county party endorsements Gottheimer Sherrill Sweeney Co-endorsement of Baraka, Gottheimer, Sherrill, Spiller, and Sweeney Declined to endorse

=== Polling ===
Poll source	Date(s) administered	Sample size (Note: Key: A – all adults RV – registered voters LV – likely voters V – unclear)	Margin of error	Ras Baraka	Steven Fulop	Josh Gottheimer	Mikie Sherrill	Sean Spiller	Stephen Sweeney	Undecided
Emerson College	May 11–13, 2025	386 (LV)	± 4.9%	11%	11%	11%	28%	10%	5%	24%
MDW Communications (D) (Note: Poll sponsored by Baraka's campaign)	May 11–13, 2025	1,100 (LV)	± 3.5%	17%	13%	7%	21%	7%	5%	30%
Global Strategy Group (D) (Note: Poll sponsored by Sherill's campaign)	May 10–13, 2025	600 (LV)	± 4.0%	15%	16%	11%	33%	6%	7%	12%
StimSight Research	May 7–10, 2025	409 (LV)	± 4.9%	21%	19%	10%	31%	9%	9%	1%
MDW Communications (D)	April 2025	1,200 (LV)	± 3.5%	14%	14%	9%	18%	11%	8%	26%
Rutgers-Eagleton	April 1–10, 2025	556 (RV)	–	9%	12%	9%	17%	10%	7%	32%
Global Strategy Group (D)	April 6–8, 2025	600 (LV)	–	13%	13%	15%	25%	12%	6%	16%
Hart Research Associates (D) (Note: Poll sponsored by Fulop's campaign)	March – April 2025	–	–	12%	14%	11%	20%	9%	9%	26%
Global Strategy Group (D) (Note: Poll sponsored by Gottheimer's campaign)	April 1–3, 2025	900 (LV)	± 3.0%	11%	13%	14%	19%	11%	5%	27%
MDW Communications (D)	March 19–20, 2025	935 (LV)	± 3.0%	12%	9%	5%	14%	8%	5%	47%
GBAO (D) (Note: Poll sponsored by Garden State Forward, a super PAC affiliated with the New Jersey Education Association, which supports Spiller)	February 27 – March 3, 2025	800 (LV)	± 3.5%	14%	10%	9%	20%	15%	8%	24%
Hart Research Associates (D)	February 2025	–	–	12%	12%	9%	25%	11%	5%	26%
MDW Communications (D)	February 10, 2025	789 (LV)	± 3.0%	10%	5%	5%	16%	10%	3%	52%
Public Policy Polling (D) (Note: Poll sponsored by Working New Jersey PAC, which supports Spiller)	January 22–23, 2025	615 (LV)	± 4.0%	9%	9%	5%	16%	11%	9%	43%
Emerson College	January 18–21, 2025	437 (LV)	± 4.6%	8%	4%	7%	10%	8%	7%	56%
Hart Research Associates (D)	November 2024	–	–	12%	7%	6%	17%	10%	9%	39%
Upswing Research (D) (Note: Poll sponsored by Laborers' International Union of North America, which supports Sherrill)	November 23–27, 2024	803 (LV)	± 3.5%	13%	8%	10%	25%	7%	8%	30%
Global Strategy Group (D)	November 20–24, 2024	800 (LV)	± 3.5%	9%	4%	9%	24%	5%	11%	38%
Renaissance Campaign Strategies (D) (Note: Poll sponsored by One New Jersey United, a pro-Baraka Super PAC)	July 13–14, 2024	802 (LV)	± 3.5%	12%	7%	8%	18%	2%	8%	45%
GQR Research (D) (Note: Poll sponsored by Principled Veterans Fund, which the New Jersey Globe says "has connections" to Sherrill)	March 7–12, 2024	603 (LV)	± 4.0%	20%	9%	5%	23%	–	12%	29%

=== Fundraising ===
Primary campaign finance activity through June 27, 2025
Candidate	Raised	Spent	Cash on hand
Ras Baraka	$7,325,248	$7,219,890	$105,358
Steven Fulop	$9,142,423	$9,009,629	$132,794
Josh Gottheimer	$9,217,621	$8,742,829	$474,792
Mikie Sherrill	$9,549,353	$9,283,760	$265,594
Sean Spiller	$454,309	$415,580	$38,729
Steve Sweeney	$9,047,708	$8,633,427	$414,281
Source: New Jersey Election Law Enforcement Commission

=== Debates ===
2025 New Jersey gubernatorial Democratic primary debates and forums
No.	Date	Host	Moderator	Link	Democratic	Democratic	Democratic	Democratic	Democratic	Democratic
P Participant A Absent N Non-invitee I Invitee W Withdrawn										
P Participant A Absent N Non-invitee I Invitee W Withdrawn					Baraka	Fulop	Gottheimer	Sherrill	Spiller	Sweeney
1	November 21, 2024	NJ PBS	David Cruz	YouTube	P	P	A	A	P	P
2	February 2, 2025	New Jersey Globe; On New Jersey; Rider University	Laura Jones	YouTube	P	P	P	P	P	P
3	May 12, 2025	NJ PBS; WNYC	Briana Vannozzi; Michael Hill	YouTube	P	P	P	P	N	P
4	May 18, 2025	New Jersey Globe; On New Jersey; Rider University	Laura Jones	YouTube	P	P	P	P	N	P

=== Results ===
Democratic primary results by county: Sherrill: 20–30%; 30–40%; 40–50%; 50–60%; 60–70%; Baraka: 30–40%; 40–50%; Gottheimer: 30–40%; Spiller: 20–30%; Sweeney: 40–50%

Democratic primary results by congressional district: Sherrill: <30%; 30–40%; 40–50%; 50–60%; Baraka: <30%; 50–60%; Gottheimer: 30–40%; Sweeney: <30%

Democratic primary results by state legislative district: Sherrill: <30%; 30–40%; 40–50%; 50–60%; 60–70%; Baraka: 30–40%; 40–50%; 50–60%; 60–70%; Fulop: 30–40%; Gottheimer: 30–40%; 40–50%; Sweeney: <30%; 30–40%; 40–50%

Democratic primary results by precinct: Sherrill: <30%; 30–40%; 40–50%; 50–60%; 60–70%; 70–80%; 80–90%; >90%; Baraka: <30%; 30–40%; 40–50%; 50–60%; 60–70%; 70–80%; 80–90%; >90%; Fulop: <30%; 30–40%; 40–50%; 50–60%; 60–70%; Gottheimer: <30%; 30–40%; 40–50%; 50–60%; 60–70%; 70–80%; 80–90%; >90%; Spiller: <30%; 30–40%; 40–50%; 50–60%; Sweeney: <30%; 30–40%; 40–50%; 50–60%; 60–70%; 70–80%

Democratic primary results
Party	Candidate	Votes	%
Democratic	Mikie Sherrill	286,244	34.02%
Democratic	Ras Baraka	173,951	20.67%
Democratic	Steven Fulop	134,573	15.99%
Democratic	Josh Gottheimer	97,384	11.57%
Democratic	Sean Spiller	89,472	10.63%
Democratic	Stephen Sweeney	59,811	7.11%
Total votes		841,435	100.0%

=== Lieutenant gubernatorial nomination ===
==== Nominee ====
- Dale Caldwell, president of Centenary University (2023–present) and former New Brunswick school board member (1998–2024)

==== Considered but not selected ====
- Samuel Delgado, vice chair of the New Jersey State Cannabis Regulatory Commission and husband of state assemblymember Yvonne Lopez
- Shavar Jeffries, former assistant attorney general (2008–2010) and candidate for mayor of Newark in 2014
- Jim Johnson, former U.S. under secretary of the Treasury for Enforcement (1998–2001) and candidate for governor in 2017
- Carlos Medina, president of the Statewide Hispanic Chamber of Commerce of New Jersey
- Lamont Repollet, president of Kean University (2020–present) and former New Jersey commissioner of education (2018–2020)

==== Declined to be considered ====
- Troy Singleton, state senator from the 7th district (2018–present)
- Benjie Wimberly, state senator from the 35th district (2025–present)

== Republican primary ==
=== Candidates ===
==== Nominee ====
- Jack Ciattarelli, former state assemblyman from the 16th district (2011–2018), nominee for governor in 2021, and candidate in 2017

==== Eliminated in primary ====
- Justin Barbera, contractor and independent candidate for New Jersey's 3rd congressional district in 2024
- Jon Bramnick, state senator from the 21st district (2022–present) and former minority leader of the New Jersey General Assembly (2012–2022) from the 21st district (2003–2022)
- Mario Kranjac, former mayor of Englewood Cliffs (2016–2024)
- Bill Spadea, radio talk show host and nominee for New Jersey's 12th congressional district in 2004

==== Disqualified ====
- Monica Brinson, former political strategist (continued running as a write-in candidate in general election)

==== Withdrawn ====
- Edward Durr, former state senator from the 3rd district (2022–2024) (endorsed Spadea)
- Jim Fazzone, former mayor of Burlington City (2008–2015) and senate nominee for LD-07 in 2023 (endorsed Bramnick)

==== Declined ====
- Chris Christie, former governor (2010–2018) and candidate for president in 2016 and 2024
- Declan O'Scanlon, state senator from the 13th district (2018–present) (endorsed Ciattarelli)

=== Endorsements ===
Jon Bramnick

U.S. executive branch officials

- Michael Chertoff, former U.S. secretary of homeland security (2005–2009)
- Anthony Scaramucci, former White House communications director (2017)

U.S. representatives

- John Boehner, former speaker of the House (2011–2015) from OH-08 (1991–2015)
- Rodney Frelinghuysen, NJ-11 (1995–2019)
- Leonard Lance, NJ-07 (2009–2019)

Statewide officials

- George P. Bush, former Texas land commissioner (2015–2023)
- Christopher Porrino, former New Jersey attorney general (2016–2018)

State assemblymembers

- Robert Auth, LD-39 (2014–present)
- Michele Matsikoudis, LD-21 (2022–present)
- Nancy Munoz, LD-21 (2009–present)

County officials

- Tayfun Selen, Morris County commissioner (2020–present)

Local officials

- 6 mayors

Party officials

- Laura Ali, Morris County Republican chair

Party chapters

- 6 municipal Republican committees

Political parties

- Mercer County Republican Committee (co-endorsement with Ciattarelli and Spadea)

Newspapers

- The Philadelphia Inquirer (Republican primary only)
Jack Ciattarelli (R)

U.S. executive branch officials

- Kellyanne Conway, former senior counselor to the president (2017–2020)
- Donald Trump, 45th and 47th president of the United States (2017–2021, 2025–present)

State senators

- Christopher J. Connors, LD-09 (2008-2024)
- Declan O'Scanlon, LD-13 (2018–present) and former state assemblymember (2008-18)
- Joseph Pennacchio, minority whip of the New Jersey Senate (2017-present), LD-26 (2008-present)
- Vincent J. Polistina, LD-02 (2021–present) and former state assemblymember (2008–12)
- Parker Space LD-24 (2018–present)
- Mike Testa, LD-01 (2019-present), chair of the Cumberland County Republican Party (2014-present)
- Latham Tiver, LD-08 (2024–present)

State assemblymembers

- Brian Bergen, LD-26 (2020-present)
- Jack Collins, former assembly speaker (1996–2002) from LD-03 (1986–2002)
- Dawn Fantasia, LD-24 (2024–present)
- DiAnne Gove, LD-09 (2009-2024)
- Don Guardian, LD-02 (2022-present)
- Mike Inganamort, LD-24 (2024-present)
- Claire Swift, LD-02 (2022-present)
- Michael Torrissi, LD-08 (2024–present)
- Brandon Umba, LD-08 (2022–2024)

County officials

- Virginia E. Haines, Ocean County commissioner (2016–present) and Republican National Committee member (2004–2025)

Party chapters

- 18 municipal Republican committees

Political parties

- Atlantic County Republican Committee
- Bergen County Republican Committee
- Burlington County Republican Committee
- Cape May County Republican Committee
- Cumberland County Republican Committee
- Essex County Republican Committee
- Gloucester County Republican Committee
- Hunterdon County Republican Committee
- Mercer County Republican Committee (co-endorsement with Bramnick and Spadea)
- Middlesex County Republican Committee
- Monmouth County Republican Committee
- Passaic County Republican Committee
- Salem County Republican Committee
- Somerset County Republican Committee
- Union County Republican Committee
- Warren County Republican Committee
Mario Kranjac

U.S. representatives

- Newt Gingrich, former speaker of the House (1995–1999) from GA-06 (1979–1999)
Bill Spadea

U.S. representatives

- Tom MacArthur, NJ-03 (2015–2019)

State legislators

- Carmen Amato, senator from LD-09 (2024–present)
- Edward Durr, senator from LD-03 (2022–2024)
- Greg Myhre, assemblymember from LD-09 (2024–present)
- Brian Rumpf, assemblymember from LD-09 (2024–present)

County officials

- 2 Ocean County commissioners
- John Catalano, Ocean County Deputy Clerk

Local officials

- 8 mayors

Party officials

- George Gilmore, Ocean County Republican chair

Individuals

- Phil Rizzo, pastor and Republican primary candidate for the 2021 New Jersey gubernatorial election

Party chapters

- 10 municipal Republican committees

Political parties

- Camden County Republican Committee
- Mercer County Republican Committee (co-endorsement with Bramnick and Ciattarelli)
- Ocean County Republican Committee

Organizations

- National Right to Life Committee (Note: National and New Jersey chapter)
Declined to endorse

U.S. representatives

- Tom Kean Jr., NJ-07 (2023–present)
- Nancy Mace, SC-01 (2021–present)
- Chris Smith, NJ-04 (1981–present)
- Jeff Van Drew, NJ-02 (2019–present)

Statewide officials

- Chris Christie, former governor of New Jersey (2010–2018)

Republican county chair endorsements Bramnick Ciattarelli Spadea

=== County conventions ===
County convention results

Cape May County Republican convention, February 5, 2025
Party	Candidate	Votes	%
Republican	Jack Ciattarelli	Unopposed	
Total votes		N/A (Note: Ciattarelli was the only candidate on the ballot.)	100.00%

Monmouth County Republican convention, February 20, 2025
Party	Candidate	Votes	%
Republican	Jack Ciattarelli	Unopposed	
Total votes		N/A	100.00%

Atlantic County Republican convention, February 22, 2025
Party	Candidate	Votes	%
Republican	Jack Ciattarelli	Unopposed	
Total votes		N/A	100.00%

Passaic County Republican convention, February 25, 2025
Party	Candidate	Votes	%
Republican	Jack Ciattarelli	Unopposed	
Total votes		N/A	100.00%

Ocean County Republican convention, February 25, 2025
Party	Candidate	Votes	%
Republican	Bill Spadea	129	60.85%
Republican	Jack Ciattarelli	83	39.15%
Total votes		212	100.00%

Cumberland County Republican convention, March 1, 2025
Party	Candidate	Votes	%
Republican	Jack Ciattarelli	Unopposed	
Total votes		N/A	100.00%

Salem County Republican convention, March 1, 2025
Party	Candidate	Votes	%
Republican	Jack Ciattarelli	Unopposed	
Total votes		N/A	100.00%

Warren County Republican convention, March 2, 2025
Party	Candidate	Votes	%
Republican	Jack Ciattarelli	Unopposed	
Total votes		N/A	100.00%

Mercer County Republican convention, March 3, 2025
Party	Candidate	Votes	%
Republican	Bill Spadea	69	42.86%
Republican	Jack Ciattarelli	59	36.65%
Republican	Jon Bramnick	33	20.50%
Total votes		161	100.00%

Somerset County Republican convention, March 4, 2025
Party	Candidate	Votes	%
Republican	Jack Ciattarelli	Unopposed	
Total votes		N/A	100.00%

Hunterdon County Republican convention, March 5, 2025
Party	Candidate	Votes	%
Republican	Jack Ciattarelli	Unopposed	
Total votes		N/A	100.00%

Union County Republican convention, March 6, 2025
Party	Candidate	Votes	%
Republican	Jack Ciattarelli	258	100.00%
Total votes		258 (Note: 22 votes were not counted, as they were undervotes.)	100.00%

Burlington County Republican convention, March 8, 2025
Party	Candidate	Votes	%
Republican	Jack Ciattarelli	Unopposed	
Total votes		N/A	100.00%

Middlesex County Republican convention, March 8, 2025
Party	Candidate	Votes	%
Republican	Jack Ciattarelli	Unopposed	
Total votes		N/A	100.00%

Camden County Republican convention, March 10, 2025
Candidate	Round 1		Round 2	
Candidate	Votes	%	Votes	%
Bill Spadea	36	47.37%	51	68.00%
Jack Ciattarelli	23	30.26%	24	32.00%
Edward Durr	29	16.96%	17	22.37%
Total ballots	76		75	

Bergen County Republican convention, March 11, 2025
Party	Candidate	Votes	%
Republican	Jack Ciattarelli	492	86.31%
Republican	Mario Kranjac	66	11.58%
Republican	Monica Brinson	12	2.11%
Total votes		570	100.00%

Essex County Republican convention, March 18, 2025
Party	Candidate	Votes	%
Republican	Jack Ciattarelli	15	88.24%
Republican	Jon Bramnick	2	11.76%
Total votes		17	100.00%

Gloucester County Republican convention, March 18, 2025
Party	Candidate	Votes	%
Republican	Jack Ciattarelli	Unopposed	
Total votes		N/A	100.00%

=== Polling ===
Poll source	Date(s) administered	Sample size	Margin of error	Jon Bramnick	Jack Ciattarelli	Edward Durr	Mario Kranjac	Bill Spadea	Other	Undecided
Emerson College	May 11–13, 2025	330 (LV)	± 5.4%	8%	44%	–	2%	18%	4% (Note: Justin Barbera with 2%; "Someone else" with 2%)	23%
National Research Inc. (R) (Note: Poll sponsored by Ciattarelli's campaign)	May 6–8, 2025	600 (LV)	± 4.0%	10%	54%	–	2%	23%	–	11%
National Research Inc. (R)	April 8–10, 2025	600 (LV)	± 4.0%	9%	50%	–	3%	22%	–	14%
Rutgers-Eagleton	April 1–10, 2025	258 (RV)	–	4%	42%	–	0%	12%	7% (Note: Justin Barbera with 3%; "None of them" 4%; "Someone else" with <1%)	34%
	March 24, 2025	Durr withdraws from the race								
KAConsulting (R) (Note: Poll commissioned by Kitchen Table Conservatives, a pro-Ciattarelli, anti-Spadea super PAC)	February 5–7, 2025	600 (LV)	± 4.0%	4%	42%	2%	2%	13%	–	35%
Emerson College	January 18–21, 2025	334 (LV)	± 5.3%	4%	26%	2%	–	13%	10% (Note: Bacon and Herberg with 3%; Canfield and Fazzone with 2%)	47%
KAConsulting (R)	June 12–14, 2024	606 (LV)	± 4.0%	3%	44%	2%	–	11%	–	38%

Regional polling

Monmouth County

Poll source	Date(s) administered	Sample size	Margin of error	Jon Bramnick	Jack Ciattarelli	Edward Durr	Bill Spadea	Undecided
Stepien Strategic Partners (R) (Note: Poll conducted for Spadea's campaign)	December 7–10, 2024	920 (LV)	±3.2%	1%	37%	3%	38%	22%

Morris County

Poll source	Date(s) administered	Sample size	Margin of error	Jon Bramnick	Jack Ciattarelli	Edward Durr	Bill Spadea	Undecided
Stepien Strategic Partners (R)	December 7–10, 2024	920 (LV)	±3.2%	5%	39%	2%	22%	32%

Ocean County

Poll source	Date(s) administered	Sample size	Margin of error	Jon Bramnick	Jack Ciattarelli	Edward Durr	Bill Spadea	Undecided
Stepien Strategic Partners (R)	December 7–10, 2024	920 (LV)	±3.2%	3%	28%	4%	38%	27%

=== Fundraising ===
Primary campaign finance activity through June 27, 2025
Candidate	Raised	Spent	Cash on hand
Justin Barbera	<$6,900	<$6,900	<$6,900
Jon Bramnick	$5,160,140	$5,015,536	$144,604
Jack Ciattarelli	$9,474,904	$9,204,860	$270,044
Edward Durr	$11,775	$4,591	$7,184
Mario Kranjac	$191,289	$198,829	-$7,540
Bill Spadea	$4,787,792	$4,572,045	$215,747
Source: New Jersey Election Law Enforcement Commission

=== Debates ===
2025 New Jersey gubernatorial Republican primary debates and forums
No.	Date	Host	Moderator	Link	Republican	Republican	Republican	Republican	Republican	Republican
P Participant A Absent N Non-invitee I Invitee W Withdrawn										
P Participant A Absent N Non-invitee I Invitee W Withdrawn					Barbera	Bramnick	Ciattarelli	Durr	Kranjac	Spadea
1	November 21, 2024	NJ PBS	David Cruz	YouTube	N	P	A	P	N	A
2	February 4, 2025	New Jersey Globe; On New Jersey; Rider University; Save Jersey	Laura Jones	YouTube	N	P	P	P	N	P
3	May 7, 2025	NJ PBS; WNYC	David Cruz; Michael Hill	YouTube	N	P	P	W	N	P
4	May 20, 2025	New Jersey Globe; On New Jersey; Rider University; Save Jersey	Laura Jones	YouTube	N	P	P	W	N	P

=== Results ===
Republican primary results by county: Ciattarelli: 40–50%; 50–60%; 60–70%; 70–80%; 80–90%

Republican primary results
Party	Candidate	Votes	%
Republican	Jack Ciattarelli	316,283	67.82%
Republican	Bill Spadea	101,408	21.75%
Republican	Jon Bramnick	29,130	6.25%
Republican	Mario Kranjac	12,782	2.74%
Republican	Justin Barbera	6,743	1.45%
Total votes		466,346	100.0%

=== Lieutenant gubernatorial nomination ===
==== Nominee ====
- Jim Gannon, Morris County sheriff (2017–present)

==== Considered but not selected ====
- Nick De Gregorio, financial trader and candidate for New Jersey's 5th congressional district in 2022
- Don Guardian, state assemblymember from the 2nd district (2022–present)
- Mike Inganamort, state assemblymember from the 24th district (2024–present)
- Tony Perry, mayor of Middletown
- Holly Schepisi, state senator from the 39th district (2021–present)

==== Declined to be considered ====
- Kristin Corrado, state senator from the 40th district (2017–present)

== Third-party candidates ==
=== Candidates ===
==== Declared ====
- Vic Kaplan (Libertarian), former chair of the New Jersey Libertarian Party and nominee for New Jersey's 12th congressional district in 2024
- Joanne Kuniansky (Socialist Workers), perennial candidate

==== Write-in ====
- Lily Benavides (Green), former Democratic New Hampshire state representative (2007–2008) and Green nominee for New Jersey's 11th congressional district in 2024
  - Running mate: Lisa Ryan, software engineer
- Monica Brinson (independent), former Republican candidate for governor and political strategist

==== Withdrawn ====
- Stephen Zielinski (Green) (Note: Zielinski submitted enough signatures in June for ballot access but withdrew from the race in early August after missing the statutory deadline to select a lieutenant governor candidate, citing "health and personal reasons". Zielinski was replaced on the ballot by Lily Benavides, who was subsequently removed from the ballot after a petition challenge by the Morris County Democratic Committee.)

== General election ==
The in-person early voting period ran from October 25 to November 2, 2025.

=== Candidates ===
- Mikie Sherrill (Democratic), U.S. representative from New Jersey's 11th congressional district (2019–2025)
  - Running mate: Dale Caldwell, president of Centenary University (2023–2026) and former New Brunswick school board member (1998–2024)
- Jack Ciattarelli (Republican), former state assemblyman from the 16th district (2011–2018), nominee for governor in 2021, and candidate in 2017
  - Running mate: Jim Gannon, Morris County sheriff (2017–present)
- Vic Kaplan (Libertarian), former chair of the New Jersey Libertarian Party and nominee for New Jersey's 12th congressional district in 2024
  - Running mate: Bruno Pereira, chair of the New Jersey Libertarian Party
- Joanne Kuniansky (Socialist Workers), perennial candidate
  - Running mate: Craig Honts

==== Write-in ====
- Lily Benavides (Green), former Democratic New Hampshire state representative (2007–2008) and Green nominee for New Jersey's 11th congressional district in 2024
  - Running mate: Lisa Ryan, software engineer
- Monica Brinson (independent), former Republican candidate for governor and political strategist

=== Debates ===
==== Gubernatorial ====
2025 New Jersey gubernatorial debates
No.	Date	Host	Moderator	Link	Democratic	Republican
Key: P Participant A Absent N Not invited I Invited W Withdrawn						
Key: P Participant A Absent N Not invited I Invited W Withdrawn					Sherrill	Ciattarelli
1	September 21, 2025	New Jersey Globe; On New Jersey; Rider University	Laura Jones	YouTube	P	P
2	October 8, 2025	Various (Note: WABC-TV, WPVI-TV, WXTV Univision 41, Edward J. Bloustein School of Planning and Public Policy, Rutgers University)	Tamala Edwards; Bill Ritter	YouTube	P	P

==== Lieutenant gubernatorial ====
2025 New Jersey lieutenant gubernatorial debates
No.	Date	Host	Moderator	Link	Democratic	Republican
Key: P Participant A Absent N Not invited I Invited W Withdrawn						
Key: P Participant A Absent N Not invited I Invited W Withdrawn					Caldwell	Gannon
1	September 30, 2025	Various (Note: WPIX, WPHL-TV, Kean University, New Jersey 101.5)	Dan Mannarino; Henry Rosoff	YouTube	P	P

=== Predictions ===
Source	Ranking	As of
The Cook Political Report	Lean D	November 4, 2025
Inside Elections	Lean D	November 4, 2025
Sabato's Crystal Ball	Lean D	November 4, 2025
State Navigate	Likely D	November 4, 2025
New Jersey Globe	Lean D	November 4, 2025

=== Post-primary endorsements ===
Mikie Sherrill (D)

2025 gubernatorial candidates

- Ras Baraka, mayor of Newark (2014–present)
- Josh Gottheimer, NJ-05 (2017–present)
- Sean Spiller, former mayor of Montclair (2020–2025)
- Stephen Sweeney, former president of the New Jersey Senate (2010–2022) from the 3rd district (2002–2022)

Executive branch officials

- Andrew Bates, White House senior deputy press secretary (2024–2025)
- Pete Buttigieg, 19th United States Secretary of Transportation (2021–2025)
- Rahm Emanuel, White House Chief of Staff (2009–2010)
- Eric Holder, United States Attorney General (2009–2015)
- Barack Obama, 44th President of the United States (2009–2017)

U.S. senators

- Cory Booker, New Jersey (2013–present)
- Ruben Gallego, Arizona (2025–present)
- Mark Kelly, Arizona (2020–present)
- Andy Kim, New Jersey (2024–present)
- Chris Murphy, Connecticut (2013–present)

U.S. representatives

- Bonnie Watson Coleman, NJ-12 (2015–present)
- Herb Conaway, NJ-03 (2025–present)
- Jason Crow, CO-06 (2019–present)
- Adriano Espaillat, NY-13 (2017–present)
- Ro Khanna, CA-17 (2017–present)
- LaMonica McIver, NJ-10 (2024–present)
- Rob Menendez, NJ-08 (2023–present)
- Donald Norcross, NJ-01 (2014–present)
- Nellie Pou, NJ-09 (2025–present)
- Nydia Velázquez, NY-07 (1993–present)

Statewide officials

- Wes Moore, governor of Maryland (2023–present)
- Phil Murphy, governor of New Jersey (2018–present)
- Josh Shapiro, governor of Pennsylvania (2023–present)
- Christine Todd Whitman, former governor of New Jersey (1994–2001) (Forward; former Republican)
- Gretchen Whitmer, governor of Michigan (2019–present)

State legislators

- Rosy Bagolie, assemblywoman from LD-27 (2024–present)
- Joseph Danielsen, assemblyman from LD-17 (2014–present)
- Margie Donlon, assemblywoman from LD-11 (2024–present)
- Vin Gopal, senator from LD-11 (2018–present)
- Andrea Katz, assemblywoman from LD-08 (2024–present)
- Raj Mukherji, senator from LD-32 (2024–present)
- Luanne Peterpaul, assemblywoman from LD-11 (2024–present)
- Britnee Timberlake, senator from LD-34 (2024–present)
- Benjie Wimberly, senator from LD-35 (2025–present)
- Andrew Zwicker, senator from LD-16 (2022–present)

Individuals

- Christian Fuscarino, executive director of Garden State Equality
- Terry Holt, national spokesman for the George W. Bush 2004 presidential campaign
- Malcolm Kenyatta, Pennsylvania state representative from HD-181 (2019–present) and vice chair of the Democratic National Committee (2025–present)
- Ken Martin, chair of the Democratic National Committee (2025–present)
- Tammy Murphy, first lady of New Jersey (2018–present)
- Julia Sass Rubin, professor at Edward J. Bloustein School of Planning and Public Policy

Labor unions

- 1199SEIU United Healthcare Workers East
- 32BJ Motor Vehicle Inspectors
- Actors' Equity Association
- American Federation of State, County and Municipal Employees New Jersey Council 63
- Committee of Interns and Residents
- Communications Workers of America District 1
- Eastern Atlantic States Regional Council of Carpenters
- Health Professionals and Allied Employees
- Hotel and Gaming Trades Council
- International Association of Bridge, Structural, Ornamental and Reinforcing Iron Workers
- International Union of Painters and Allied Trades District Council 21
- New Jersey Education Association
- New Jersey State AFL-CIO
- New Jersey State Association of Pipe Trades
- Retail, Wholesale and Department Store Union
- SEIU 32BJ
- SEIU New Jersey State Council
- Sheet Metal Workers New Jersey State Council
- UNITE HERE Local 54
- 9 United Association locals
- 6 United Food and Commercial Workers locals
- United Service Workers Union
- Workers United
- Workers United Laundry, Distribution and Food Service Joint Board

Organizations

- Brady Campaign
- Clean Water Action
- College Democrats of America
- College Democrats of New Jersey
- Democratic Governors Association
- Garden State Equality
- Giffords
- Human Rights Campaign
- People for the American Way
- People's Organization For Progress
- Progressive Victory
- Reproductive Freedom for All
- Vote Mama

Newspapers

- Asbury Park Press
- Burlington County Times
- Courier News
- Courier-Post
- The Daily Journal
- Daily Record
- Home News Tribune
- New Jersey Herald
- Philadelphia Gay News
- The Philadelphia Inquirer
- The Record
- USA Today
Jack Ciattarelli (R)

2025 gubernatorial candidates

- Edward Durr, former state senator from the 3rd district (2022–2024)
- Mario Kranjac, former mayor of Englewood Cliffs (2016–2024)

U.S. executive branch officials

- Donald Trump, 45th and 47th president of the United States (2017–2021, 2025–present)
- JD Vance, 50th vice president of the United States (2025–present)

U.S. representatives

- Byron Donalds, FL-19 (2021–present)
- Thomas Kean Jr., NJ-07 (2023–present)
- Mike Lawler, NY-17 (2023–present)
- Chris Smith, NJ-04 (1981–present)
- Jeff Van Drew, NJ-02 (2019–present)

Statewide officials

- Jenniffer González-Colón, governor of Puerto Rico (2025–present)
- Brian Kemp, governor of Georgia (2019–present), chair of the Republican Governors Association (2024–present)
- Thomas Kean, former governor of New Jersey (1982–1990)

State senators

- Anthony M. Bucco, minority leader (2023–present) from LD-25 (2019–present)
- Holly Schepisi, LD-39 (2021–present)
- Nicholas Sacco, LD-32 (1994–2024) and mayor of North Bergen (1991–present) (Democratic)
- Mike Testa, LD-01 (2019–present)

State assemblymembers

- Rafael Fraguela, former LD-20 (2002–2004) (Democratic)
- Jamel Holley, former LD-20 (2015–2022) (Democratic)
- Michele Matsikoudis, LD-21 (2022–present)
- Silverio Vega, former LD-33 (2006–2008) and former mayor of West New York, New Jersey (2006–2011) (Democratic)

Individuals

- Curtis Bashaw, real estate developer and Republican nominee in the 2024 United States Senate election in New Jersey
- KC Crosbie, co-chair of the Republican National Committee (2025–present)
- Kelsey Grammer, actor
- Joe Gruters, co-chair of the Republican National Committee (2025–present)
- Sean Hannity, television host
- Benny Johnson, activist
- Jack Posobiec, activist
- Scott Presler, political organizer
- Vivek Ramaswamy, former CEO of Roivant Sciences and 2024 Republican presidential candidate
- Sid Rosenberg, radio host

Labor unions

- International Union of Operating Engineers Local 825
- Bricklayers and Allied Craftworkers Locals 4 & 5
- Port Authority Police Lieutenants Benevolent Association
- Port Authority Police Detectives Endowment Association, INC
- New Jersey Fraternal Order of Police

Organizations

- Association of Former New Jersey State Troopers
- The Lakewood Vaad
- Moms for Liberty
- National Federation of Independent Business New Jersey
- New Jersey State Retired Police and Firemen's Association
- Republican Governors Association

Newspapers and other media

- New York Post
- 77 WABC
Declined to endorse

2025 gubernatorial candidates

- Bill Spadea, radio talk show host (Republican)

Organizations

- Make the Road Action (endorsed against Ciattarelli)
- Working Families Party (endorsed against Ciattarelli)

=== Polling ===
Aggregate polls

Source of poll aggregation	Dates administered	Dates updated	Mikie Sherrill (D)	Jack Ciattarelli (R)	Other/Undecided (Note: Calculated by taking the difference of 100% and all other candidates combined.)	Margin
270toWin	October 27–31, 2025	October 31, 2025	50.1%	45.7%	4.2%	Sherrill +4.4%
Decision Desk HQ	through November 3, 2025	November 3, 2025	50.6%	45.7%	3.7%	Sherrill +4.9%
FiftyPlusOne	through November 3, 2025	November 3, 2025	50.4%	44.7%	4.9%	Sherrill +5.7%
RealClearPolitics	October 14–30, 2025	November 1, 2025	48.9%	45.6%	5.5%	Sherrill +3.3%
Average			50.0%	45.4%	4.6%	Sherrill +4.6%

Poll source	Date(s) administered	Sample size	Margin of error	Mikie Sherrill (D)	Jack Ciattarelli (R)	Other	Undecided
Research Co.	November 2–3, 2025	429 (LV)	± 4.6%	51%	48%	1% (Note: Vic Kaplan (LP) with 1%)	–
Research Co.	November 2–3, 2025	450 (LV)	± 4.6%	48%	46%	1%	5%
John Zogby Strategies (D)	October 31 – November 3, 2025	1,205 (LV)	± 2.9%	55%	43%	2% (Note: "Another candidate" with 2%)	–
AtlasIntel	October 25–30, 2025	1,639 (LV)	± 2.0%	50%	49%	–	1%
SoCal Strategies (R) (Note: Poll sponsored by Red Eagle Politics, a conservative content creator who supports Ciattarelli.)	October 28–29, 2025	800 (LV)	–	52%	45%	–	3%
Suffolk University	October 26–29, 2025	500 (LV)	± 4.4%	46%	42%	2% (Note: Vic Kaplan (LP) and Joanne Kuniansky (SWP) with 1%)	7%
Emerson College (Note: Poll sponsored by PIX11 and The Hill)	October 25–28, 2025	1,000 (LV)	± 3.0%	50% (Note: With voters who lean towards a given candidate)	48%	1% (Note: "Someone else" with 1%)	1%
Emerson College	October 25–28, 2025	1,000 (LV)	± 3.0%	49%	48%	1%	2%
Beacon Research (D)/ Shaw & Company Research (R) (Note: Poll sponsored by Fox News)	October 24–28, 2025	956 (LV)	± 3.0%	52%	45%	–	3%
Beacon Research (D)/ Shaw & Company Research (R)	October 24–28, 2025	1,107 (RV)	± 3.0%	52%	43%	–	5%
Quinnipiac University	October 23–28, 2025	1,166 (LV)	± 3.8%	51%	43%	2%	4%
Quinnipiac University	October 23–28, 2025	1,166 (LV)	± 3.8%	51% (Note: H2H between Sherill and Ciattarelli)	44%	–	4%
YouGov	October 17–28, 2025	1,153 (LV)	± 4.0%	54%	44%	2% (Note: Vic Kaplan (LP) and Joanne Kuniansky (SWP) with 0%)	–
YouGov	October 17–28, 2025	1,153 (LV)	± 4.0%	51%	42%	1%	6%
Quantus Insights (R)	October 26–27, 2025	1,380 (LV)	± 2.6%	49%	46%	–	5%
co/efficient (R)	October 23–27, 2025	995 (LV)	± 3.3%	48%	47%	1%	5%
A2 Insights	October 24–26, 2025	812 (LV)	–	51%	47%	–	2%
GQR (D)	October 15–20, 2025	1,000 (LV)	± 4.0%	52%	40%	–	8%
Concord Public Opinion Partners (D) (Note: Poll sponsored by Democrats for Education Reform, which supports Sherrill)	October 16–18, 2025	605 (LV)	± 3.9%	49%	40%	–	11%
Rutgers-Eagleton	October 3–17, 2025	795 (LV)	± 4.7%	50%	45%	–	5%
KAConsulting (R) (Note: Poll sponsored by Change NJ, a pro-Ciattarelli, anti-Sherrill super PAC)	October 15–16, 2025	601 (RV/LV)	± 4.0%	47%	44%	–	9%
InsiderAdvantage (R)/Trafalgar Group (R)	October 14–15, 2025	800 (LV)	± 3.5%	45%	44%	4%	7%
Fairleigh Dickinson University	October 9–15, 2025	814 (RV)	± 3.4%	52%	45%	–	3%
Beacon Research (D)/ Shaw & Company Research (R)	October 10–14, 2025	869 (LV)	± 3.0%	50%	45%	–	5%
Beacon Research (D)/ Shaw & Company Research (R)	October 10–14, 2025	1,002 (RV)	± 3.0%	48%	44%	–	8%
Quinnipiac University	October 9–13, 2025	1,327 (LV)	± 3.6%	50%	44%	2%	4%
Quinnipiac University	October 9–13, 2025	1,327 (LV)	± 3.6%	51%	44%	–	4%
Rasmussen Reports (R)	October 8–9, 2025	955 (LV)	± 3.0%	46%	40%	4% (Note: "Third-party candidate" with 4%)	9%
Neighborhood Research (R)	October 6–9, 2025	311 (LV)	± 5.6%	44%	44%	–	12%
Public Policy Polling (D) (Note: Poll commissioned by the Democratic Governors Association, which supports Sherrill)	October 2–3, 2025	703 (RV)	± 3.7%	49%	43%	–	8%
John Zogby Strategies (D)	September 30 – October 2, 2025	912 (LV)	± 3.3%	50%	42%	–	8%
Quantus Insights (R)	September 29–30, 2025	900 (LV)	± 3.3%	48%	46%	–	6%
Beacon Research (D)/ Shaw & Company Research (R)	September 25–28, 2025	822 (LV)	± 3.0%	50%	42%	–	8%
Beacon Research (D)/ Shaw & Company Research (R)	September 25–28, 2025	1,002 (RV)	± 3.0%	48%	41%	–	11%
Global Strategy Group (D)	September 22–25, 2025	800 (LV)	± 3.5%	50%	43%	–	7%
Valcour/Save Jersey (R)	September 23–24, 2025	1,274 (LV)	± 2.8%	47%	45%	–	7%
Emerson College	September 22–23, 2025	935 (LV)	± 3.1%	43%	43%	3%	11%
yes. every kid.	September 20–22, 2025	704 (LV)	± 3.7%	48%	41%	–	10%
National Research Inc. (R)	September 16–18, 2025	600 (LV)	± 4.0%	45%	46%	–	9%
Quinnipiac University	September 11–15, 2025	1,238 (LV)	± 3.9%	49%	41%	2%	6%
Quinnipiac University	September 11–15, 2025	1,238 (LV)	± 3.9%	51%	42%	–	7%
National Research Inc. (R)	September 8–10, 2025	600 (LV)	± 4.0%	47%	45%	–	8%
Quantus Insights (R)	September 2–4, 2025	600 (LV)	± 4.3%	47%	37%	–	16%
Quantus Insights (R)	September 2–4, 2025	600 (LV)	± 4.3%	49%	39%	–	12%
TIPP Insights (R) (Note: Poll sponsored by League of American Workers)	August 25–28, 2025	1,524 (RV)	± 3.0%	37%	36%	–	27%
TIPP Insights (R)	August 25–28, 2025	1,349 (LV)	± 3.0%	46%	39%	2% (Note: Joanne Zielinski [sic] and David Kaplan [sic] with 1%. Note the poll incorrectly named Joanne Kuniansky as "Joanne Zielinski" and Vic Kaplan as "David Kaplan")	12%
TIPP Insights (R)	August 25–28, 2025	1,073 (RV) (Note: Among "regular voters")	± 3.0%	47%	43%	2%	8%
Rutgers-Eagleton	July 31 – August 11, 2025	1,650 (LV)	± 3.7%	44%	35%	3%	17%
Rutgers-Eagleton	July 31 – August 11, 2025	1,650 (LV)	± 3.7%	47%	37%	3%	12%
A2 Insights	July 29 – August 2, 2025	629 (LV)	–	51%	45%	–	4%
StimSight Research	July 18–24, 2025	1,108 (LV)	± 3.3%	48%	42%	1%	9%
Fairleigh Dickinson University	July 17–23, 2025	806 (LV)	± 3.4%	45%	37%	3%	15%
National Research Inc. (R)	July 2025	600 (LV)	± 4.0%	46%	43%	–	11%
KAConsulting (R)	June 24–27, 2025	800 (RV/LV)	± 3.5%	47%	42%	–	11%
Cygnal (R) (Note: Poll sponsored by the American Principles Project, a conservative group)	June 19–20, 2025	500 (LV)	± 4.4%	50%	43%	–	7%
Rutgers-Eagleton	June 13–16, 2025	621 (LV)	± 5.4%	51%	31%	–	18%
Rutgers-Eagleton	June 13–16, 2025	621 (LV)	± 5.4%	56%	35%	–	9%
National Research Inc. (R)	June 11–12, 2025	600 (LV)	± 4.0%	45%	42%	–	12%
SurveyUSA (D)	May 28–30, 2025	576 (LV)	± 6.1%	51%	38%	–	12%

== Results ==
Election turnout by county (left) and municipality (right):
20–30%
30–40%
40–50%
50–60%
60–70%
70–80%

2025 New Jersey gubernatorial election
Party	Candidate	Votes	%	±%
Democratic	Mikie Sherrill Dale Caldwell	1,896,610	56.88%	+5.66%
Republican	Jack Ciattarelli Jim Gannon	1,417,705	42.52%	–5.48%
Libertarian	Vic Kaplan Bruno Pereira	11,880	0.36%	+0.06%
Socialist Workers	Joanne Kuniansky Craig Honts	8,164	0.24%	+0.09%
Total votes		3,334,359	100.00%	N/A
Democratic hold				

=== By county ===
County	Mikie Sherrill Democratic		Jack Ciattarelli Republican		Various candidates Other parties		Margin		Total votes cast
County	#	%	#	%	#	%	#	%	Total votes cast
Atlantic	51,201	51.48%	47,603	47.86%	652	0.66%	3,598	3.62%	99,456
Bergen	190,461	55.26%	152,682	44.30%	1,518	0.44%	37,779	10.96%	344,661
Burlington	116,774	60.47%	75,342	39.02%	986	0.51%	41,432	21.46%	193,102
Camden	130,752	68.08%	60,129	31.31%	1,179	0.61%	70,623	36.77%	192,060
Cape May	18,270	41.45%	25,588	58.06%	214	0.49%	-7,318	-16.60%	44,072
Cumberland	21,348	52.18%	19,272	47.11%	290	0.71%	2,076	5.07%	40,910
Essex	188,681	76.92%	55,503	22.63%	1,118	0.46%	133,178	54.29%	245,302
Gloucester	67,066	51.88%	61,265	47.39%	935	0.72%	5,801	4.49%	129,266
Hudson	127,181	74.67%	41,021	24.08%	2,122	1.25%	86,160	50.59%	170,324
Hunterdon	31,663	47.44%	34,683	51.96%	401	0.60%	-3,020	-4.52%	66,747
Mercer	91,713	71.31%	36,156	28.11%	741	0.58%	55,557	43.20%	128,610
Middlesex	174,038	62.64%	101,830	36.65%	1,992	0.72%	72,208	25.99%	277,860
Monmouth	131,484	45.79%	154,166	53.69%	1,503	0.52%	-22,682	-7.90%	287,153
Morris	116,488	50.89%	111,422	48.67%	1,006	0.44%	5,066	2.21%	228,916
Ocean	90,323	32.56%	185,957	67.03%	1,160	0.42%	-95,634	-34.47%	277,440
Passaic	86,053	57.71%	61,966	41.56%	1,081	0.73%	24,087	16.15%	149,100
Salem	9,782	42.06%	13,281	57.11%	192	0.83%	-3,499	-15.05%	23,255
Somerset	83,355	59.33%	56,095	39.93%	1,037	0.74%	27,260	19.40%	140,487
Sussex	26,308	40.56%	38,118	58.77%	429	0.66%	-11,810	-18.21%	64,855
Union	124,470	67.18%	59,646	32.19%	1,162	0.63%	64,824	34.99%	185,278
Warren	19,199	42.19%	25,980	57.09%	326	0.72%	-6,781	-14.90%	45,505
Totals	1,896,610	56.88%	1,417,705	42.52%	20,044	0.60%	478,905	14.36%	3,334,359

Counties that flipped from Republican to Democratic:

- Atlantic (largest municipality: Egg Harbor Township)
- Cumberland (largest municipality: Vineland)
- Gloucester (largest municipality: Washington Township)
- Morris (largest municipality: Parsippany-Troy Hills)

=== By congressional district ===
Sherrill won ten of 12 congressional districts, including her own and one held by a Republican.

District	Sherrill	Ciattarelli	Representative
1st	63.2%	36.1%	Donald Norcross
2nd	46.0%	53.4%	Jeff Van Drew
3rd	57.0%	42.5%	Herb Conaway
4th	35.4%	64.2%	Chris Smith
5th	53.0%	46.6%	Josh Gottheimer
6th	60.6%	38.7%	Frank Pallone
7th	50.7%	48.7%	Thomas Kean Jr.
8th	74.8%	24.1%	Rob Menendez
9th	59.4%	39.9%	Nellie Pou
10th	80.7%	18.5%	LaMonica McIver
11th	57.4%	42.1%	Mikie Sherrill
12th	66.9%	32.4%	Bonnie Watson Coleman

=== By state legislative district ===
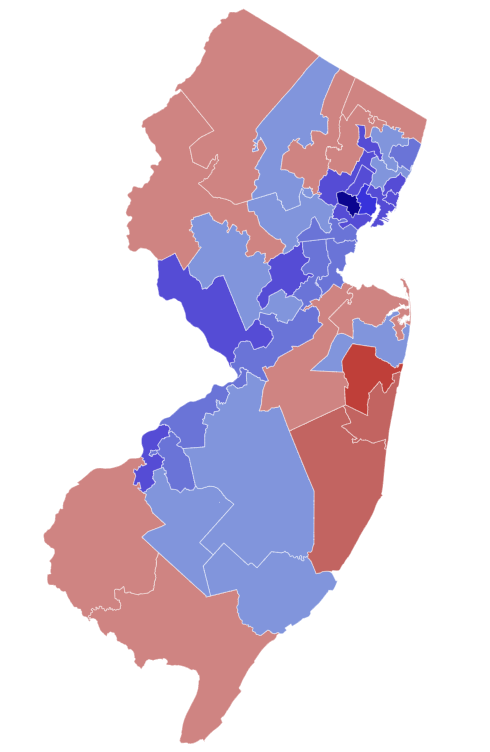
State Legislative District Results Sherrill: 50–60% 60–70% 70–80% 80–90% >90% Ciattarelli: 50–60% 60–70% 70–80%

Sherrill won 28 of 40 state legislative districts, including four with Republican state senators. Ciattarelli won 12 districts, including one held by a Democrat.

District	Sherrill	Ciattarelli	State Senator
1st	46.8%	52.6%	Mike Testa
2nd	54.0%	45.3%	Vincent J. Polistina
3rd	49.1%	50.1%	John Burzichelli
4th	54.2%	45.1%	Paul D. Moriarty
5th	70.2%	29.0%	Nilsa Cruz-Perez
6th	67.4%	32.0%	James Beach
7th	66.8%	32.7%	Troy Singleton
8th	52.5%	47.0%	Latham Tiver
9th	37.0%	62.5%	Carmen Amato
10th	37.7%	61.9%	James W. Holzapfel
11th	54.1%	45.3%	Vin Gopal
12th	39.9%	59.6%	Owen Henry
13th	43.7%	55.8%	Declan O'Scanlon
14th	60.5%	39.0%	Linda R. Greenstein
15th	74.1%	25.3%	Shirley Turner
16th	59.2%	40.2%	Andrew Zwicker
17th	75.0%	24.1%	Bob Smith
18th	63.2%	36.2%	Patrick J. Diegnan
19th	62.2%	37.1%	Joe F. Vitale
20th	73.8%	25.3%	Joseph Cryan
21st	55.4%	44.1%	Jon Bramnick
22nd	67.6%	31.7%	Nicholas Scutari
23rd	47.4%	51.9%	Doug Steinhardt
24th	42.8%	56.6%	Parker Space
25th	52.3%	47.2%	Anthony M. Bucco
26th	49.0%	50.6%	Joseph Pennacchio
27th	70.6%	28.8%	John F. McKeon
28th	92.1%	7.4%	Renee Burgess
29th	84.0%	15.2%	Teresa Ruiz
30th	25.0%	74.6%	Robert W. Singer
31st	72.7%	25.8%	Angela V. McKnight
32nd	77.0%	21.6%	Raj Mukherji
33rd	74.2%	25.0%	Brian P. Stack
34th	76.3%	23.2%	Britnee Timberlake
35th	72.0%	27.1%	Benjie Wimberly
36th	56.9%	42.5%	Paul Sarlo
37th	66.2%	33.3%	Gordon M. Johnson
38th	55.0%	44.6%	Joseph Lagana
39th	49.4%	50.3%	Holly Schepisi
40th	48.5%	51.0%	Kristin Corrado

== Exit poll ==
2025 New Jersey gubernatorial election voter demographics (CNN)
Demographic subgroup	Sherrill	Ciattarelli	% of total vote
Ideology
Liberals	94	6	34
Moderates	62	37	33
Conservatives	11	88	33
Party
Democrats	97	2	38
Republicans	7	92	31
Independents	56	43	31
Donald Trump job approval
Approve	8	92	42
Disapprove	93	6	56
Most important issue facing New Jersey
Economy	66	33	32
Taxes	37	62	34
Healthcare	92	7	16
Immigration	28	71	7
2024 presidential vote
Kamala Harris	97	3	50
Donald Trump	7	93	42
Another candidate	63	30	2
Did not vote	65	31	3
Gender
Men	49	50	47
Women	62	37	53
Income
$200,000 or more	57	43	19
$100,000-$199,999	53	47	33
$50,000-$99,999	51	49	26
Less than $50,000	71	28	23
Race/ethnicity
White	47	52	70
Asian	82	17	5
Latino	68	31	10
Black	94	5	10
Race/ethnicity by gender
White men	41	59	34
White women	54	46	36
Black men	92	7	4
Black women	95	4	6
Latino men	61	38	5
Latina women	73	26	6
All other voters	69	29	10
Age
18–29 years old	69	31	11
30–44 years old	67	32	19
45-64 years old	51	48	34
65 and older	51	48	35
Area type
Urban	84	15	7
Suburban	54	45	93
Education
College graduate	62	38	55
No college degree	50	49	45
Education by race
White college graduates	55	45	40
Non-white college graduates	79	21	15
Whites without college	37	63	31
Non-whites without college	75	23	15
Education by gender and race
White women with college degrees	62	38	20
White women without college degrees	43	57	16
White men with college degrees	48	52	18
White men without college degrees	31	69	15
Voters of color	77	22	30
Educational attainment
Advanced degree	68	32	23
Bachelor's degree	64	36	31
Associate's degree	55	45	10
Some college	53	46	15
Never attended college	45	54	21

== See also ==
- 2025 New Jersey General Assembly election

== Notes ==
Partisan clients
