= Jim Gannon (sheriff) =

American law enforcement officer

77th Sheriff of Morris County
- Incumbent
- Assumed office January 2, 2017
- Preceded by: Ed Rochford

Personal details
- Born: 1960 or 1961 (age 64–65)
- Party: Republican
- Spouse: Lisa Gannon (m. 1984; died 2010)
- Children: 1
- Education: County College of Morris (AS); William Paterson University (BA); Rutgers University, Newark (GrCert); New Jersey City University (attended); University of Virginia (attended); Fairleigh Dickinson University (MS)

James M. Gannon (born 1960 or 1961) is an American law enforcement officer and Republican Party politician currently serving as the 77th sheriff of Morris County, New Jersey. He was the running mate of Republican nominee Jack Ciattarelli in the 2025 New Jersey gubernatorial election, losing to Democrats Mikie Sherrill and Dale Caldwell.

== Early life and education ==
James M. Gannon was raised in Boonton, New Jersey in a Catholic family of Irish and Polish ancestry. His father was a decorated detective in the New York City Police Department.

He attended Our Lady of Mount Carmel Elementary School and Boonton High School. While in high school, he played sports and joined the Boonton Township Fire Service. After graduating, he earned an associate degree in law enforcement from the County College of Morris and a bachelor's degree in criminal justice administration from William Paterson University. He later graduated from the FBI National Academy, received a certificate in supervisory management from Rutgers University, Newark, studied public administration at New Jersey City University and the University of Virginia, and earned a master's in administrative sciences from Fairleigh Dickinson University.

== Law enforcement and private sector career ==
After graduating college, Gannon became a patrolman in Boonton and neighboring Boonton Township before serving for over two decades at the Office of the Morris County Prosecutor, where he attained the rank of Deputy Chief of Investigations and established the county cold case unit. He was assigned to the national Joint Terrorism Task Force, where he focused on investigating foreign terrorist organizations operating within the United States. He has also lectured, trained, and conducted investigations in Russia, Ukraine, South Africa, Hungary, Thailand, and Uzbekistan.

Throughout his law enforcement career, Gannon served as a leading homicide detective and was involved in every homicide case in the county for two decades. He led investigations into the 1987 abduction and murder of Lisa O'Boyle, the 2001 fatal shooting of FuncoLand store employees Erik Rewoldt and Jeff Eresman, and 2001 sexual assault and murder of 10-year-old Morristown resident Walter Contreras Valenzuela. As a detective, Gannon insisted on referring to all homicide cases by the victim's name, rather than the location or perpetrator's name. Following the conviction of day laborer Porfirio Jimenez for Valenzuela's murder in 2008, Gannon retired from law enforcement.

After retiring from public law enforcement, Gannon joined the pharmaceutical corporation Novartis and retired as the company's global head of security risk in 2015. In 2016, Gannon served as an adjunct professor at Centenary University.

== County sheriff ==
In 2016, Gannon ran for Morris County sheriff to succeed Ed Rochford. He was endorsed by Democratic state senator and former governor Richard Codey and was elected that November with 62.6 percent of the vote. He was re-elected in 2019 with 59 percent of the vote and re-elected in 2022 and 2025 without opposition, despite the county becoming significantly more Democratic during that time.

During his first one hundred days in office, Gannon partnered with non-profits to develop the Hope One program, a mobile substance abuse and mental health disorder outreach resource providing free naloxone training and kits, as well as direct access to addiction recovery and mental health programs. In 2017, Gannon opened a wing of the Morris County Correctional Facility to assist inmates with substance use disorders repair relationships, manage anger, spiritually grow, and access education. In 2018, Gannon partnered with the Morris County Police Chiefs' Association to found a comprehensive school safety program to train law enforcement officers, educators, and mental health experts gauge potential threats to school safety. The program led to creation of a mobile app to facilitate reports of concerning behavior.

== 2025 lieutenant gubernatorial campaign ==
On July 23, 2025, Republican nominee for governor Jack Ciattarelli named Gannon as his running mate at Johnnies Tavern in Boonton. Ciattarelli cited Gannon's law enforcement experience and support Gannon had received from Ciattarelli's Democratic opponent, Mikie Sherrill. Gannon cited reducing property taxes, expanding energy production and lowering energy costs, revising the state's school funding formula, and restoring cooperation between U.S. Immigration and Customs Enforcement and local law enforcement as his top policy priorities and praised Ciattarelli for a "positive message of common-sense solutions and transformative change for our state."

== Personal life ==
Gannon married his wife, Lisa, in 1984. Lisa died in 2010 of multiple sclerosis. They had one daughter, Kate DeSantis.

== Electoral history ==
=== Morris County Sheriff ===
2025 Morris County Election for Sheriff
Party	Candidate	Votes	%	±%
Republican	James M. Gannon (incumbent)	140,511	98.27	▼1.73
Write-in		2,472	1.73	▲1.73
Total votes		142,983	100	Steady

2022 Morris County Election for Sheriff
Party	Candidate	Votes	%	±%
Republican	James M. Gannon (incumbent)	125,541	100	▲41.04
Total votes		125,541	100	▲0.04
Republican hold				

2019 Morris County Election for Sheriff
Party	Candidate	Votes	%	±%
Republican	James M. Gannon (incumbent)	65,652	58.96	▼3.59
Democratic	William Schievella	45,659	41	
Total votes		111,311	99.96	▲0.04
Republican hold				

2016 Morris County Election for Sheriff
Party	Candidate	Votes	%
Republican	James M. Gannon	138,359	62.55
Democratic	Mark Dombrowski	82,671	37.37
Total votes		221,030	99.92

=== Morris County Sheriff Republican Primaries ===
2016 Morris County Republican Primary Election for Sheriff
Candidate	Votes	%
James M. Gannon	30,184	64.63
John G. Sierchio	16,468	35.26
Total votes	46,652	99.89
