= Lawrence Francis Kramer =

American politician (1933–2023)

Pat Kramer
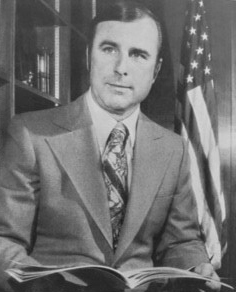
- Kramer in 1971

Mayor of Paterson
- In office 1967–1972
- Preceded by: Frank X. Graves Jr.
- Succeeded by: Arthur C. Dwyer (acting)
- In office 1975–1982
- Preceded by: Thomas Rooney
- Succeeded by: Frank X. Graves Jr.

Personal details
- Born: February 24, 1933
- Died: August 24, 2023 (aged 90)
- Party: Republican
- Education: Fairleigh Dickinson University

Lawrence Francis "Pat" Kramer Jr. (February 24, 1933 – August 24, 2023) was an American politician who was the Mayor of Paterson, New Jersey from 1967 to 1972 and 1975 until 1982.

Kramer ran for Governor of New Jersey in the Republican primary in 1981. He came in second to future Governor Thomas Kean.

== Early life ==
Lawrence Francis Kramer was born on February 24, 1933. He was the fifth child and first son of Lawrence and Ann Kramer. He attended public schools in Paterson, graduating from School No. 20, Central High School (now John F. Kennedy High School). He attended Clemson University before earning a degree from Fairleigh Dickinson University.

== Political career ==
Kramer, who owned a lumberyard, entered Paterson city politics by serving on the Board of Education and city planning board.

=== Mayoralty ===
==== 1966 election ====
In 1966, incumbent mayor Frank X. Graves Jr. was prohibited from seeking a third consecutive term. Republican municipal chairman Herman Steinberg and former U.S. Representative Gordon Canfield backed Kramer for the nomination for mayor over a large field of potential contenders, including sheriff Frank Davenport. Kramer faced Housing Authority chairman John Wegner in the November general election. Although Kramer was the underdog in the heavily Democratic city, he benefited from divided opposition following a bitter Democratic primary, in which Wegner, with the support of Passaic County boss Anthony Grossi, had narrowly defeated former mayor Michael DeVita. DeVita refused to endorse Wegner, and many of his supporters backed Kramer. Kramer won an impressive victory with 57% of the vote, carrying 67 of the 92 voting districts in Paterson and winning by roughly 6,000 votes. The victory instantly made Kramer a rising star in New Jersey Republican politics, and he was quickly mentioned as a future candidate for governor or United States Senate.

Following his election, Kramer and Davenport seized control of the Passaic County Republican organization; Davenport became county chairman.

==== First term (1967–1970) ====
Kramer quickly became popular in Paterson during his first term. President Richard Nixon appointed him one of four mayors to serve on the White House Advisory Council on Intergovernmental Relations.

==== 1969 election ====
In his re-election bid, Kramer faced a tough challenge in former mayor Frank X. Graves, who was eligible for a third non-consecutive term. Kramer won with 56% of the vote over Graves.

=== Commissioner of Community Affairs ===
In September 1972, Governor of New Jersey William T. Cahill appointed Kramer, who was ineligible to run for a third consecutive term that fall, to his cabinet as Commissioner of Community Affairs. His tenure in office was short-lived, however, as Cahill lost re-nomination in the June 1973 Republican primary. Kramer spent the rest of the term as a lame duck and officially resigned office in 1974, when Cahill was succeeded by Brendan Byrne.

=== Return to mayoralty ===
==== 1974 election ====
In 1974, Paterson adopted non-partisan May municipal elections, giving a Kramer a path to return to office despite the anti-Republican sentiment in New Jersey during the Watergate scandal. He challenged his successor, Thomas Rooney, in a nasty and close general election campaign. On election day, Kramer prevailed by 161 votes out of over 25,000 cast.

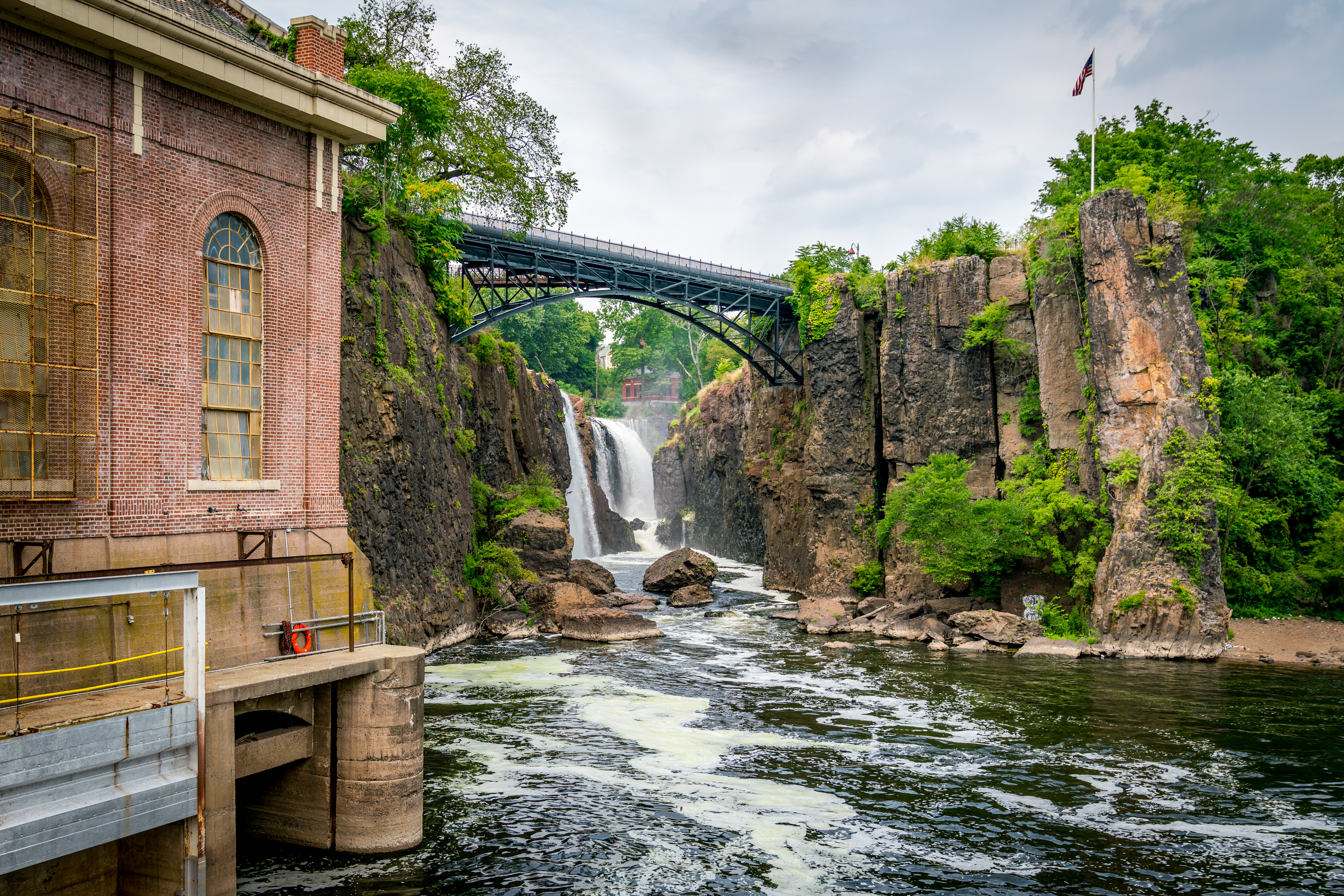
The Great Falls of the Passaic River (pictured here in 2016) were recognized as a national historic site during Kramer's third term in office.

==== Third term (1975–78) ====
During his third term in office, Kramer considered running for governor against Byrne in 1977 but ultimately opted not to run. He was successful in bringing President Gerald Ford to visit Paterson for the dedication of the Great Falls as a National Historic Landmark District in 1976 and National Historic Civil Engineering Landmark and National Historic Mechanical Engineering Landmark in 1977.

==== 1978 election ====
In 1978, Kramer was re-elected over Rooney and John Bell, the city's human resources director, with 55% of the vote.

=== 1981 campaign for governor ===
In 1981, Kramer began to traverse the state to campaign for governor. As a moderate, Kramer accumulated significantly more party organization support than his opponents and had endorsements from nine Republican county chairmen. Under the county line system, in which endorsed candidates received preferable ballot positioning and typically won the lion's share of the vote, Kramer appeared to be the favorite for the nomination. However, Kramer's leading opponent, former Assembly Speaker Thomas Kean, working with Governor Byrne and allies in the legislature, worked to pass a bill to eliminate the county line for the 1981 primaries. The move, which was proposed by Kean advisor Roger Stone and supported by state senator Bill Gormley, effectively neutered Kramer's campaign late in the race, forcing him to change his campaign strategy to appeal directly to voters throughout the state.

Ultimately, Kean won the primary with 31% of the vote and went on to be elected to two terms as governor. Kramer finished second with 21% of the vote, followed closely by businessman Bo Sullivan with 17% and state senator James Wallwork with 15%.

=== Later career ===
After leaving office in 1982, Kramer declined to run for Passaic County Freeholder and began work as a consultant and developer, as well as a lobbyist for federal funding for Paterson. In 1983, Governor Kean nominated him for a seat on the New Jersey Sports and Exposition Authority, but his nomination was blocked by Joseph Bubba through the practice of senatorial courtesy.

He made his final run for office in 1991, when he ran for New Jersey Senate in the competitive 35th legislative district. Despite the Republican wave in that year's elections, which gained the party ten seats, Kramer was defeated by interim senator John Girgenti by 1,894 votes.

== Personal life and death ==
Kramer died on August 24, 2023, at the age of 90. His former political opponent and eventual successor as mayor, Bill Pascrell, mourned Kramer as "a true public servant and a pillar of our city," as well as a "brilliant advisor, collaborator, and friend."
