= 1991 New Jersey Senate election =

1991 New Jersey Senate elections
- November 5, 1991

All 40 seats in the New Jersey State Senate 21 seats needed for a majority
- Turnout: 51% (▲4pp)
	Majority party	Minority party
Leader	John H. Dorsey (stepped down)	John A. Lynch Jr.
Party	Republican	Democratic
Leader since	January 12, 1988	January 9, 1990
Leader's seat	23rd (Boonton Township)	17th (New Brunsick)
Last election	16	24
Seats before	17	23
Seats won	27	13
Seat change	▲10	▼10
Popular vote	1,005,245	717,674
Percentage	57.1%	40.8%
- Results by district Democratic hold Democratic gain Republican hold Republican gain
Senate President before election
John A. Lynch Jr.
Democratic
Elected Senate President
Donald DiFrancesco
Republican

The 1991 New Jersey Senate election was held on November 5. The election took place mid-way through the term of Governor James Florio. The results were a landslide victory for the Republican Party amidst a tax revolt by New Jersey voters. Democrats picked up only one seat, that of Senator Lee B. Laskin in District 6. Republicans picked up eleven Democrat seats, winning control of the Senate for the first time since 1974. Republicans flipped districts 4, 7, 10, 13, 14, 15, 18, 19, 30, 36, and 38.

This was the first election after the 1990 census. Two years later, Governor Florio narrowly lost re-election to Christine Todd Whitman. As of 2026, this remains the largest total number of seats held by the Republican Party and the largest number of seats gained by the Republican Party in a single election since the current districting scheme was introduced in 1973. This remains the last time the Republicans or any party held a veto-proof majority in the chamber.

Contents

Background • Aftermath and legacy
Incumbents not running • Summary of results
By District: 1 • 2 • 3 • 4 • 5 • 6 • 7 • 8 • 9 • 10 • 11 • 12 • 13 • 14 • 15 • 16 • 17 • 18 • 19 • 20 • 21 • 22 • 23 • 24 • 25 • 26 • 27 • 28 • 29 • 30 • 31 • 32 • 33 • 34 • 35 • 36 • 37 • 38 • 39 • 40

== Background ==
=== Redistricting ===
1982–92

1992–2002

New Jersey Legislature before (left) and after (right) the 1991 redistricting

As required, the New Jersey legislature redistricted its state legislative districts in advance of the 1991 election. Redistricting was considered to have favored Republicans, reflecting relative growth in the suburbs versus the state's Democratic urban cores.

=== Tax revolt ===
A centerpiece of the Florio administration's legislative agenda was a $2.8 billion tax increase, which one consultant called "the largest single tax increase in the history of the finances of the 50 states" and "a national test case on both political and economic grounds." The increase also came amid a national economic recession. Very little public input was possible due to the package's short turnaround; the Florio administration cited restrictive deadlines. According to administration officials, the tax package was designed to aid blue-collar workers and the middle class, who it later admitted were "also the people most upset by enactment of the taxes." After the 1991 election, Florio aide Doug Berman admitted, "We were very full of ourselves."

Voter anger over the tax increase grew throughout the early months of 1990; many voters felt that Florio's projection during the 1989 campaign that new taxes were unlikely had amounted to a lie. In response to growing protest, the administration adopted a wait-and-see approach, maintaining the protests would peter out as the legislative package delivered benefits in the form of rebate checks, lower auto insurance rates, and increased funding for education.

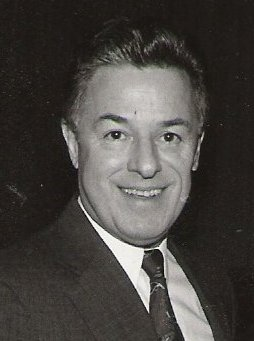
Opposition to Governor Jim Florio's $2.8 billion tax increase dominated New Jersey politics from 1990 through 1992.

In June 1990, New Jersey 101.5 talk radio callers Pat Ralston and John Budzash formed Hands Across New Jersey, a protest group which rallied thousands of supporters (Note: Estimates vary from 6,000 to 50,000.) in Trenton on July 1 and collected over 350,000 petition signatures within the month. The group's stated mission was to obtain binding referendums and a recall mechanism; Democratic Assemblyman Thomas P. Foy declared his support for a recall provision on NJ101.5 soon after.

By fall 1990, Florio's approval rating sank to 18 percent; it would not exceed the low twenties for the duration of the 1991 campaign. The first political impact of the "tax revolt" was made manifest in November 1990, when incumbent Democratic senator Bill Bradley was nearly unseated by Christine Todd Whitman. During her campaign, Whitman repeatedly asked Bradley for his position on the increase, but he demurred, calling it a state issue.

Republicans centered their 1991 campaign on opposition to the increase, as did even some incumbent Democrats, such as Senator Paul Contillo.

=== Gun control ===
Another major legislative achievement of the Florio administration was a strict gun control measure targeted at "assault-style weapons." The bill's passage led the NRA Political Victory Fund to spend nearly $250,000 in the 1991 elections targeting candidates in both parties who had voted in favor of the bill and supporting those who pledged to repeal it.

Statewide polling generally showed that the bill was popular with New Jerseyans, so supporters were not directly attacked; rather, the N.R.A. spent heavily to advertise for or against candidates on other issues. Statewide, the N.R.A. donated directly to 78 legislative candidates, 75 of whom were Republicans, and 70 of whom won.

=== Education ===
The Florio administration also received surprise opposition from the New Jersey Education Association, which had backed his election in 1989. After the passage of the Quality Education Act and strict new spending caps on local school boards, the NJEA endorsed a slate of legislative candidates that was almost exclusively Republican. The total slate included 46 Republicans and only three Democrats.

== Aftermath and legacy ==
=== Talk radio ===
Prior to 1990, New Jersey 101.5 was known as an "obscure Trenton oldies station." During the tax revolt and the station's transition to talk radio, listenership quadrupled from 150,000 to 600,000. The John and Ken Show, from which the protest was launched, later moved to KFI in Los Angeles and became nationally syndicated in 1997.

=== 1992 Senate presidency contest ===
With Republican control of the Senate becoming likely during the campaign, Senator Donald DiFrancesco and Senate Minority Leader John H. Dorsey, neither of whom faced serious re-election challenges, engaged in a proxy contest to control the next Republican caucus and win the election for Senate President. Dorsey had already survived one attempt by DiFrancseco to unseat him as leader in December 1990, and DiFrancesco had previously served as minority leader himself from 1982 to 1984.

DiFrancseco had the support of moderates, led by former governor Thomas Kean, and offered a less confrontational approach than Dorsey. Publicly, DiFrancesco said his efforts were focused on electing a Republican majority, but challenged the idea that as Senate Minority Leader, he was entitled to the presidency, saying, "It's not like I'm throwing Mr. Dorsey out of a position, because no one has it."

Each Senator spent at least $50,000 in other Senate races. Among incumbents, the struggle was projected as a dead heat, so special effort was made to influence incoming legislators. For instance, Dorsey spent $9,000 and DiFrancesco spent $7,000 supporting the campaign of Andrew R. Ciesla. Ultimately, DiFrancesco prevailed. Dorsey remained in party leadership as Majority Leader but faced another intra-party challenge from future Governor Chris Christie in his district's primary. He successfully disqualified Christie from the ballot but lost the general election to Democrat Gordon MacInnes and left politics.

DiFrancesco served as Senate President until 2002. After Christine Todd Whitman resigned to become Director of the Environmental Protection Agency, DiFrancesco succeeded her as the 51st Governor of New Jersey and oversaw the state's response to the September 11 attacks. He retired from politics after withdrawing from the 2001 gubernatorial election.

== Incumbents not running for re-election ==
=== Democratic ===
- Daniel Dalton (4th district)
- John F. Russo (10th district)
- Carmen A. Orechio (30th district) (redistricted to 36th)

== Summary of results ==
District	Incumbent	Party	Elected Senator	Party
1st Legislative District	James Cafiero (Note: Cafiero won a 1990 special election to complete the unexpired term of Senator James R. Hurley, who resigned to join the New Jersey Casino Control Commission.)	Rep	James Cafiero	Rep
2nd Legislative District	William Gormley	Rep	William Gormley	Rep
3rd Legislative District	Raymond Zane	Dem	Raymond Zane	Dem
4th Legislative District	Daniel Dalton	Dem	John Matheussen	Rep
5th Legislative District	Walter Rand	Dem	Walter Rand	Dem
6th Legislative District	Lee Laskin	Rep	John Adler	Dem
7th Legislative District	Thomas P. Foy (Note: Foy was appointed to complete the unexpired term of Senator Catherine A. Costa, who resigned to become Director of the New Jersey Division of Alcoholic Beverage Control.)	Dem	Bradford S. Smith	Rep
8th Legislative District	C. William Haines (Note: Haines won a 1984 special election to complete the term of Jim Saxton, who resigned to take a seat in the U.S. House of Representatives.)	Rep	C. William Haines	Rep
9th Legislative District	Leonard T. Connors	Rep	Leonard T. Connors	Rep
10th Legislative District	John F. Russo	Dem	Andrew R. Ciesla	Rep
11th Legislative District	Joseph A. Palaia (Note: Palaia won a 1989 special election to complete the unexpired term of Senator Frank Pallone, who resigned to take his seat in the U.S. House of Representatives.)	Rep	Joseph A. Palaia	Rep
12th Legislative District	John O. Bennett (Note: Bennett won a 1989 special election to complete the unexpired term of Senator S. Thomas Gagliano, who resigned to become the director of NJ Transit.)	Rep	John O. Bennett	Rep
13th Legislative District	James T. Phillips (Note: Phillips was appointed to complete the unexpired term of Senator Richard Van Wagner, who resigned to join the New Jersey Sports and Exposition Authority.)	Dem	Joe Kyrillos	Rep
14th Legislative District	Francis J. McManimon	Dem	Peter Inverso	Rep
15th Legislative District	Gerald R. Stockman	Dem	Dick LaRossa	Rep
16th Legislative District	John H. Ewing	Rep	John H. Ewing	Rep
17th Legislative District	John A. Lynch Jr.	Dem	John A. Lynch Jr.	Dem
18th Legislative District	Thomas H. Paterniti	Dem	Jack Sinagra	Rep
19th Legislative District	Laurence Weiss	Dem	Randy Corman	Rep
20th Legislative District	Raymond Lesniak	Dem	Raymond Lesniak	Dem
21st Legislative District	C. Louis Bassano	Rep	C. Louis Bassano	Rep
22nd Legislative District	Donald DiFrancesco	Rep	Donald DiFrancesco	Rep
23rd Legislative District	William E. Schluter (Note: Schluter was appointed to complete the unexpired term of Dick Zimmer, who resigned to take his seat in the U.S. House of Representatives in January 1991.)	Rep	William E. Schluter	Rep
24th Legislative District	Robert Littell (Note: Littell won a 1990 special election to complete the unexpired term of Senator Wayne Dumont, who retired in July 1990.)	Rep	Robert Littell	Rep
25th Legislative District	John H. Dorsey	Rep	John H. Dorsey	Rep
26th Legislative District	Leanna Brown	Rep	Leanna Brown	Rep
27th Legislative District	Richard Codey	Dem	Richard Codey	Dem
28th Legislative District	Ronald Rice (Note: Rice won a special November 1986 election to complete the unexpired term of John P. Caufield, who died in August 1986.)	Dem	Ronald Rice	Dem
29th Legislative District	Wynona Lipman	Dem	Wynona Lipman	Dem
30th Legislative District	Carmen Orechio (Note: Redistricted to 36th district, declined to challenge Senator Ambrosio.)	Dem	John E. Dimon	Rep
31st Legislative District	Edward T. O'Connor Jr.	Dem	Edward T. O'Connor Jr.	Dem
32nd Legislative District	Thomas F. Cowan	Dem	Thomas F. Cowan	Dem
33rd Legislative District	Bob Menendez (Note: Menendez won a March 1991 special election to complete the unexpired term of Senator Christopher Jackman, who died.)	Dem	Bob Menendez	Dem
34th Legislative District	Joseph Bubba	Rep	Joseph Bubba	Rep
35th Legislative District	John Girgenti (Note: Girgenti won a 1990 special election to complete the unexpired term of Senator Frank X. Graves Jr., who died.)	Dem	John Girgenti	Dem
36th Legislative District	Gabriel M. Ambrosio	Dem	John P. Scott	Rep
37th Legislative District	Matthew Feldman	Dem	Matthew Feldman	Dem
38th Legislative District	Paul Contillo	Dem	Louis F. Kosco	Rep
39th Legislative District	Gerald Cardinale	Rep	Gerald Cardinale	Rep
40th Legislative District	Henry McNamara (Note: McNamara won a November 1985 special election to complete the unexpired term of Senator Garrett Hagedorn, who died in August 1985.)	Rep	Henry McNamara	Rep

=== Close races ===
Seats where the margin of victory was under 10%:

1. District 15, 1.8% gain
2. District 4, 3.4% gain
3. District 17, 4.0%
4. District 36, 4.0% gain
5. District 35, 6.4%
6. District 2, 6.6%
7. District 18, 7.0% gain
8. District 7, 7.2% gain
9. District 37, 7.2%

== District 1 ==
=== Democratic primary ===
1991 Democratic primary
Party	Candidate	Votes	%
Democratic	Ronald J. Casella	3,037	100%
Total votes		3,037	100%

=== Republican primary ===
1991 Republican primary
Party	Candidate	Votes	%
Republican	James Cafiero (incumbent)	6,690	100%
Total votes		6,690	100%

=== General election ===
1991 general election
Party	Candidate	Votes	%
Republican	James Cafiero (incumbent)	31,624	62.0%
Democratic	Ronald J. Casella	19,404	38.0%
Total votes		51,028	100%

== District 2 ==
=== Democratic primary ===
1991 Democratic primary
Party	Candidate	Votes	%
Democratic	Meg Worthington	2,460	100%
Total votes		2,460	100%

=== Republican primary ===
- Domenic Cappella, Ventnor City Administrator
- William Gormley, incumbent senator since 1982 and candidate for governor in 1989

During the primary, the National Rifle Association of America spent over $58,000, through various political action committees and alongside the Coalition of New Jersey Sportsmen, to defeat Gormley as retaliation for his support of the 1990 firearms restrictions. Gormley was the only Republican in the Senate to support the bill, but his vote was decisive in its passage. Another group, the Committee for Sensible Government, which received more than $40,000 from the NRA, financed at least six mailings denouncing Gormley for his past opposition to tax rebates. The PAC's chairman, Buena Vista Township committeeman William Fennen, expressed broader opposition to Gormley on the grounds that he was moderate.

Gormley said he initially planned not to campaign, having won his last primary with 73.5 percent of the vote and not having any opponent in the early stages of the campaign against him.

1991 Republican primary
Party	Candidate	Votes	%
Republican	William Gormley (incumbent)	5,369	54.17%
Republican	Domenic Cappella	4,542	45.83%
Total votes		9,911	100%

=== General election ===
- Dolores Cooper, Assemblywoman from Linwood (independent)
- William Gormley, incumbent senator since 1982 and candidate for governor in 1989 (Republican)
- Meg Worthington, Galloway Township council member since 1986 (Democratic)

Gormley faced another difficult challenge in the general election, where the N.R.A. gave $20,000 directly to the independent campaign of Republican Assemblywoman Dolores G. Cooper. Cooper ultimately dropped out of the race, but Gormley spent $350,000 to preserve his chances at re-election.

He prevailed by a much narrower margin than in 1987.

1991 general election
Party	Candidate	Votes	%
Republican	William Gormley (incumbent)	22,731	53.3%
Democratic	Meg Worthington	19,908	46.7%
Total votes		42,639	100%

== District 3 ==
=== Democratic primary ===
1991 Democratic primary
Party	Candidate	Votes	%
Democratic	Raymond Zane	5,604	100%
Total votes		5,604	100%

=== Republican primary ===
1991 Republican primary
Party	Candidate	Votes	%
Republican	G. Erwin Sheppard (write-in)	540	100%
Total votes		540	100%

=== General election ===
1991 general election
Party	Candidate	Votes	%
Democratic	Raymond Zane (incumbent)	31,648	60.9%
Republican	G. Erwin Sheppard	16,600	32.0%
No Party Deals	Frank L. Sorrentino	3,683	7.1%
Total votes		51,931	100%

== District 4 ==
=== Democratic primary ===
1991 Democratic primary
Party	Candidate	Votes	%
Democratic	Anthony S. Marsella	6,294	100%
Total votes		6,294	100%

=== Republican primary ===
1991 Republican primary
Party	Candidate	Votes	%
Republican	John J. Matheussen	3,153	100%
Total votes		3,153	100%

=== General election ===
- John Matheussen, attorney (Republican)
- Anthony S. Marsella, Assemblyman (Democratic)

1991 general election
Party	Candidate	Votes	%
Republican	John J. Matheussen	21,553	51.7%
Democratic	Anthony S. Marsella	20,118	48.3%
Total votes		41,671	100%

== District 5 ==
=== Democratic primary ===
1991 Democratic primary
Party	Candidate	Votes	%
Democratic	Walter Rand (incumbent)	7,361	100%
Total votes		7,361	100%

=== Republican primary ===
1991 Republican primary
Party	Candidate	Votes	%
Republican	Rev. Edwin A. Martinez	1,811	100%
Total votes		1,811	100%

=== General election ===
1991 general election
Party	Candidate	Votes	%
Democratic	Walter Rand (incumbent)	25,834	67.1%
Republican	Rev. Edwin A. Martinez	12,666	32.9%
Total votes		38,500	100%

== District 6 ==
=== Democratic primary ===
1991 Democratic primary
Party	Candidate	Votes	%
Democratic	John Adler	3,621	100%
Total votes		3,621	100%

=== Republican primary ===
1991 Republican primary
Party	Candidate	Votes	%
Republican	Lee B. Laskin (incumbent)	4,407	100%
Total votes		4,407	100%

=== General election ===
- John Adler, Cherry Hill councilman and candidate for U.S. House in 1990
- Lee Laskin, incumbent senator since 1977

John Adler was recruited to run against Senator Lee Laskin by Camden Democratic boss George Norcross. Norcross decided to target Laskin after the Senator refused to secure an appointment for Norcorss's father to the New Jersey Racing Commission. Norcross also sought to secure Democratic control on the county board of freeholders.

In a surprise move, Democrats began spending heavily in this race late. Within the final week, the party purchased $250,000 in television advertisements for Adler on Philadelphia stations. Steve DeMicco, executive director of the New Jersey Democratic Committee, called the move a "sneak attack" which had been planned in advance in light of polling showing that Laskin was vulnerable. Up to that point in the race, the Republican Party had not given any assistance to Laskin, either because he was seen as safe for re-election or because of his reputation as a political maverick within the party. He voted against every state budget during his time in office.

On election night, Laskin conceded by calling Adler a "slimeball." Adler responded, "Win or lose, [Laskin] stoops lower than he should," a reference to Laskin's exact same insult against his opponent Maria Barnaby Greenwald four years earlier.

1991 general election
Party	Candidate	Votes	%
Democratic	John Adler	31,289	55.4%
Republican	Lee B. Laskin (incumbent)	25,191	44.6%
Total votes		56,480	100%

This would ultimately be the sole legislative seat gained by the Democrats in the 1991 elections; both Assembly incumbents in the district survived. Adler would go on to serve in the Senate until his 2008 election to the United States House of Representatives.

== District 7 ==
=== Democratic primary ===
1991 Democratic primary
Party	Candidate	Votes	%
Democratic	Thomas P. Foy (incumbent)	6,238	100%
Total votes		6,238	100%

=== Republican primary ===
1991 Republican primary
Party	Candidate	Votes	%
Republican	Bradford S. Smith	3,219	100%
Total votes		3,219	100%

=== General election ===
- Thomas P. Foy, incumbent senator since 1990 (Democratic)
- Bradford S. Smith, Burlington County Freeholder and former mayor of Cinnaminson (Republican)

The campaign in the 7th district followed the standard attacks on the Democratic record. Republicans, led by Smith, harped on the incumbents' refusal to sign a no-tax increase pledge and called for a complete audit of state government, a repeal of the $2.8 billion increase, and a repeal of the Quality Education Act. At one point during the campaign, the Republican candidates delivered three rubber chickens to the incumbent legislators' offices.

Foy did respond, claiming he would have signed the no-tax pledge if it had a clause allowing him to use his "best judgment."

Even on Election Day, the race was presumed safe. In reaction to his defeat, Foy said, "The impossible has happened." Smith said he was confident of victory because of the "tremendous support we have had going door-to-door."

1991 general election
Party	Candidate	Votes	%
Republican	Bradford S. Smith	26,892	53.6%
Democratic	Thomas P. Foy (incumbent)	23,290	46.4%
Total votes		50,182	100%

== District 8 ==
=== Democratic primary ===
1991 Democratic primary
Party	Candidate	Votes	%
Democratic	Thomas P. Long	2,290	100%
Total votes		2,290	100%

=== Republican primary ===
1991 Republican primary
Party	Candidate	Votes	%
Republican	C. William Haines (incumbent)	5,528	100%
Total votes		5,528	100%

=== General election ===
- Harvey Dinerman, Medford operation supervisor (Democratic)
- C. William Haines, farmer and incumbent senator since 1985 (Republican)

As expected, the Republican incumbent C. William Haines was easily re-elected in the 8th district. Despite redistricting stretching the district into Atlantic and Camden counties, the district remained overwhelmingly Republican. No Democrat had won the area since Assemblyman John Sweeney in the post-Watergate 1973 Democratic landslide.

Dinerman ran on a platform of disrupting Republican hegemony in the district and blaming the state's financial mess on Republican former governor Thomas Kean.

1991 general election
Party	Candidate	Votes	%
Republican	C. William Haines (incumbent)	28,850	66.3%
Democratic	Harvey Dinerman	14,644	33.7%
Total votes		43,494	100%

== District 9 ==
=== Democratic primary ===
1991 Democratic primary
Party	Candidate	Votes	%
Democratic	Joseph Meglino	4,172	100%
Total votes		4,172	100%

=== Republican primary ===
1991 Republican primary
Party	Candidate	Votes	%
Republican	Leonard T. Connors (incumbent)	9,327	100%
Total votes		9,327	100%

=== General election ===
1991 general election
Party	Candidate	Votes	%
Republican	Leonard T. Connors (incumbent)	42,914	69.9%
Democratic	Joseph Meglino	18,448	30.1%
Total votes		61,362	100%

== District 10 ==
=== Democratic primary ===
1991 Democratic primary
Party	Candidate	Votes	%
Democratic	John Paul Doyle	3,310	100%
Total votes		3,310	100%

=== Republican primary ===
1991 Republican primary
Party	Candidate	Votes	%
Republican	Andrew R. Ciesla	4,570	58.60%
Republican	Tom Blomquist	3,229	41.40%
Total votes		7,799	100%

=== General election ===
- Andrew R. Ciesla, Brick Township councilman (Republican)
- John Paul Doyle, incumbent Assemblyman from Brick Township (Democratic)

This race pitted two Brick Township residents against each other. Ciesla ran hard on the generic Republican opposition to the Florio tax increase and Doyle's votes, as an Assemblyman, in favor of the tax package. Doyle countered that Ciesla was indecisive and that the Democratic program had allowed municipal governments to cut local property taxes, but avoided directly mentioning the tax package or Governor Florio.

1991 general election
Party	Candidate	Votes	%
Republican	Andrew R. Ciesla	34,711	61.6%
Democratic	John Paul Doyle	21,643	38.4%
Total votes		56,354	100%

== District 11 ==
=== Democratic primary ===
1991 Democratic primary
Party	Candidate	Votes	%
Democratic	Gloria R. Filippione	2,239	88.96%
Democratic	Irwin Zucker	278	11.04%
Total votes		2,517	100%

=== Republican primary ===
1991 Republican primary
Party	Candidate	Votes	%
Republican	Joseph A. Palaia	3,019	100%
Total votes		3,019	100%

=== General election ===
1991 general election
Party	Candidate	Votes	%
Republican	Joseph A. Palaia	35,349	65.2%
Democratic	Gloria R. Filippone	16,286	30.1%
Non Lawyer	Thomas W. Appleby, Jr.	1,738	3.2%
Nonpartisan	Joshua Leinsdorf	819	1.5%
Total votes		54,192	100%

== District 12 ==
=== Democratic primary ===
1991 Democratic primary
Party	Candidate	Votes	%
Democratic	Joseph D. Youssouf	3,165	100%
Total votes		3,165	100%

=== Republican primary ===
1991 Republican primary
Party	Candidate	Votes	%
Republican	John O. Bennett (incumbent)	4,340	100%
Total votes		4,340	100%

=== General election ===
1991 general election
Party	Candidate	Votes	%
Republican	John O. Bennett (incumbent)	36,629	67.2%
Democratic	Joseph D. Youssouf	15,151	27.8%
Abortion Is Murder	Pat Daly	1,760	3.2%
Libertarian	Helen L. Radder	941	1.7%
Total votes		54,481	100%

== District 13 ==
=== Democratic primary ===
1991 Democratic primary
Party	Candidate	Votes	%
Democratic	James T. Phillips (incumbent)	3,525	100%
Total votes		3,525	100%

=== Republican primary ===
1991 Republican primary
Party	Candidate	Votes	%
Republican	Joe Kyrillos	3,167	100%
Total votes		3,167	100%

=== General election ===
1991 general election
Party	Candidate	Votes	%
Republican	Joe Kyrillos	34,547	67.8%
Democratic	James T. Phillips (incumbent)	16,437	32.2%
Total votes		50,984	100%

== District 14 ==
=== Democratic primary ===
1991 Democratic primary
Party	Candidate	Votes	%
Democratic	Francis J. McManimon (incumbent)	3,654	100%
Total votes		3,654	100%

=== Republican primary ===
1991 Republican primary
Party	Candidate	Votes	%
Republican	Peter Inverso	2,620	100%
Total votes		2,620	100%

=== General election ===
- Peter P. Garibaldi, former state senator from Monroe Township (independent)
- Peter Inverso, former Mercer County Freeholder (Republican)
- Francis J. McManimon, incumbent senator since 1981 (Democratic)

This district was heavily redrawn following the 1990 census, replacing Franklin Township with Monroe Township and making it significantly more Republican. Nevertheless, the Florio administration argued that its blue-collar, conservative residents were those whom the tax package was most intended to help.

The candidacy of former Republican senator Peter Garibaldi, a Monroe resident and former mayor, also had the potential draw votes away from Inverso, who had never campaigned outside of Mercer County.

1991 general election
Party	Candidate	Votes	%
Republican	Peter Inverso	30,367	54.6%
Democratic	Francis J. McManimon (incumbent)	20,496	36.8%
Independent	Peter P. Garibaldi	4,791	8.6%
Total votes		55,654	100%

== District 15 ==
=== Democratic primary ===
- Richard N. Krajewski
- Gerald R. Stockman, incumbent senator since 1982

1991 Democratic primary
Party	Candidate	Votes	%
Democratic	Gerald R. Stockman (incumbent)	7,691	82.56%
Democratic	Richard N. Krajewski	1,625	17.44%
Total votes		9,316	100%

=== Republican primary ===
1991 Republican primary
Party	Candidate	Votes	%
Republican	Dick LaRossa	2,300	100%
Total votes		2,300	100%

=== General election ===
- Dick LaRossa, consultant and host of the televised New Jersey State Lottery drawing (Republican)
- Gerald R. Stockman, incumbent senator since 1982 (Democratic)

This was the narrowest race of the year. The 15th district, based in Trenton, was heavily Democratic.

During the campaign, Stockman, who had sponsored the tax increase, defended it and referred to Republican proposals to repeal it as "snake oil." Stockman, the chair of the Senate County and Municipal Government Committee, had also sponsored a bill to reform tax assessment which critics said would create a mass exodus from larger cities, including Trenton.

LaRossa became the first Republican to represent Trenton since 1946, the year he was born.

1991 general election
Party	Candidate	Votes	%
Republican	Dick LaRossa	22,465	50.9%
Democratic	Gerald R. Stockman (incumbent)	21,672	49.1%
Total votes		44,137	100%

== District 16 ==
=== Democratic primary ===
1991 Democratic primary
Party	Candidate	Votes	%
Democratic	Bonnie C. Sovinee	2,302	100%
Total votes		2,302	100%

=== Republican primary ===
1991 Republican primary
Party	Candidate	Votes	%
Republican	John H. Ewing	8,757	100%
Total votes		8,757	100%

=== General election ===
1991 general election
Party	Candidate	Votes	%
Republican	John H. Ewing	33,059	68.4%
Democratic	Bonnie C. Sovinee	15,255	31.6%
Total votes		48,314	100%

== District 17 ==
=== Democratic primary ===
1991 Democratic primary
Party	Candidate	Votes	%
Democratic	John A. Lynch Jr. (incumbent)	3,059	100%
Total votes		3,059	100%

=== Republican primary ===
1991 Republican primary
Party	Candidate	Votes	%
Republican	Edward R. Tiller	1,264	100%
Total votes		1,264	100%

=== General election ===
- John A. Lynch Jr., incumbent senator since 1982 and President of the New Jersey Senate (Democratic)
- Edward Tiller (Republican)

This was the narrowest Democratic victory of the campaign; Lynch was serving as Senate President at the time and was opposed by the New Jersey Education Association, the state's primary public school union, for his sponsorship of the Quality Education Act and proposal to cap teachers' salaries. In response to union opposition, Lynch accused the NJEA of "hiding behind" schoolchildren to justify salary increases.

In announcing an almost exclusively Republican slate of legislative endorsements, the NJEA singled Lynch out for defeat by asking teachers to contribute "Ten for Tiller"—$10 each to Tiller's campaign.

During the campaign, Lynch accused Tiller of lying about his military service in Korea. Other mailers accused Tiller of lying about his educational background, business experience, and qualifications for office. Tiller accused Lynch in turn of being under federal investigation and of numerous connections to organized crime. One independent mailer read, "John Lynch is CONNECTED to the UNDERWORLD."

1991 general election
Party	Candidate	Votes	%
Democratic	John A. Lynch Jr. (incumbent)	17,053	52.0%
Republican	Edward R. Tiller	15,718	48.0%
Total votes		32,771	100%

Lynch later sued Tiller and the NJEA for defamation. The complaint was dismissed after appeal to the Supreme Court of New Jersey.

== District 18 ==
=== Democratic primary ===
- Thomas H. Paterniti, incumbent senator since 1988 and Mayor of Edison
- Harry S. Pozycki, attorney and former Metuchen councilman

Incumbent senator Thomas Paterniti was challenged by Harry Pozycki in a rematch of their 1987 contest, which Paterniti narrowly won.

This was the most closely watched primary in the state; party officials estimated that each candidate spent $150,000 before primary election day.

1991 Democratic primary
Party	Candidate	Votes	%
Democratic	Harry S. Pozycki	6,963	53.21%
Democratic	Thomas H. Paterniti (incumbent)	6,122	46.79%
Total votes		13,085	100%

=== Republican primary ===
1991 Republican primary
Party	Candidate	Votes	%
Republican	Jack Sinagra	2,064	100%
Total votes		2,064	100%

=== General election ===
- Harry S. Pozycki, former Metuchen councilman (Democratic)
- Jack Sinagra, mayor of East Brunswick (Republican)

Pozycki had an uphill campaign against the Florio tax package. Though he himself was not an incumbent, Pozycki's Assembly running mate George A. Spadoro had voted in favor of the package.

During the campaign, Sinagra proposed using turnpike funds to purchase NJ Transit.

1991 general election
Party	Candidate	Votes	%
Republican	Jack Sinagra	28,638	53.5%
Democratic	Harry S. Pozycki	24,889	46.5%
Total votes		53,527	100%

== District 19 ==
=== Democratic primary ===
1991 Democratic primary
Party	Candidate	Votes	%
Democratic	Laurence S. Weiss (incumbent)	7,459	100%
Total votes		7,459	100%

=== Republican primary ===
1991 Republican primary
Party	Candidate	Votes	%
Republican	Randy Corman	1,898	100%
Total votes		1,898	100%

=== General election ===
- Randy Corman, Sayreville councilman and assistant counsel to the Senate Republicans
- Laurence S. Weiss, incumbent senator since 1978

This blue-collar district had long been safely Democratic, but was put in play by the 1990 tax increase. Senator Weiss, the long-time chairman of the Senate Finance, Revenue and Appropriations committee, faced particular scrutiny as one of the initial authors and key supporters of the tax increase. He said, "I'm in a targeted district, but I'm not the target—I'm the bullseye."

Corman publicly noted the tax issue was the center of his campaign: "There are other planks in my platform... But right now, the voters are concerned with taxes and I think Larry Weiss is more vulnerable than most Democrats." One Corman ad depicted Weiss, Assembly incumbent Thomas J. Deverin, and Governor Florio with the caption, "For two years, Florio, Weiss and Deverin have been laughing all the way to the bank. On Nov. 5th, you can wipe the smile off their faces."

1991 general election
Party	Candidate	Votes	%
Republican	Randy Corman	25,536	55.6%
Democratic	Laurence S. Weiss (incumbent)	20,396	44.4%
Total votes		45,932	100%

After his defeat, Weiss pushed for repeal of the tax package he had helped write.

== District 20 ==
=== Democratic primary ===
1991 Democratic primary
Party	Candidate	Votes	%
Democratic	Raymond Lesniak (incumbent)	7,402	100%
Total votes		7,402	100%

=== Republican primary ===
1991 Republican primary
Party	Candidate	Votes	%
Republican	Jeffrey B. Cohen	1,171	100%
Total votes		1,171	100%

=== General election ===
1991 general election
Party	Candidate	Votes	%
Democratic	Raymond Lesniak (incumbent)	16,733	57.1%
Republican	Jeffrey B. Cohen	12,585	42.9%
Total votes		29,318	100%

== District 21 ==
=== Democratic primary ===
1991 Democratic primary
Party	Candidate	Votes	%
Democratic	Kathy Mills	3,242	100%
Total votes		3,242	100%

=== Republican primary ===
1991 Republican primary
Party	Candidate	Votes	%
Republican	C. Louis Bassano (incumbent)	5,423	%
Total votes		5,423	100%

=== General election ===
1991 general election
Party	Candidate	Votes	%
Republican	C. Louis Bassano (incumbent)	38,591	71.6%
Democratic	Elly Manov	15,311	28.4%
Total votes		53,902	100%

== District 22 ==
=== Democratic primary ===
1991 Democratic primary
Party	Candidate	Votes	%
Democratic	June Fischer	2,413	100%
Total votes		2,413	100%

=== Republican primary ===
1991 Republican primary
Party	Candidate	Votes	%
Republican	Donald DiFrancesco (incumbent)	7,057	100%
Total votes		7,057	100%

=== General election ===
1991 general election
Party	Candidate	Votes	%
Republican	Donald DiFrancesco (incumbent)	32,872	78.2%
Populist	John L. Kucek	9,153	21.8%
Total votes		42,025	100%

== District 23 ==
=== Democratic primary ===
1991 Democratic primary
Party	Candidate	Votes	%
Democratic	George Goceljak	2,380	69.92%
Democratic	Dan Seyler	1,024	30.08%
Total votes		3,404	100%

=== Republican primary ===
1991 Republican primary
Party	Candidate	Votes	%
Republican	Bill Schluter	8,242	100%
Total votes		8,242	100%

=== General election ===
1991 general election
Party	Candidate	Votes	%
Republican	Bill Schluter	34,936	72.4%
Democratic	George Goceljak	13,317	27.6%
Total votes		48,253	100%

== District 24 ==
=== Democratic primary ===
1991 Democratic primary
Party	Candidate	Votes	%
Democratic	Frederick J. Katz Jr.	1,937	100%
Total votes		1,937	100%

=== Republican primary ===
1991 Republican primary
Party	Candidate	Votes	%
Republican	Robert Littell (incumbent)	8,119	52.78%
Republican	George T. Daggett	7,264	47.22%
Total votes		15,383	100%

=== General election ===
1991 general election
Party	Candidate	Votes	%
Republican	Robert Littell (incumbent)	31,432	74.8%
Democratic	Frederick J. Katz, Jr.	7,216	17.2%
Middle Class Alternative	Gary “Buzz” Howell	3,363	8.0%
Total votes		42,011	100%

== District 25 ==
=== Democratic primary ===
1991 Democratic primary
Party	Candidate	Votes	%
Democratic	Adele Montgomery	3,240	100%
Total votes		3,240	100%

=== Republican primary ===
1991 Republican primary
Party	Candidate	Votes	%
Republican	John H. Dorsey (incumbent)	13,696	100%
Total votes		13,696	100%

=== General election ===
- John H. Dorsey, incumbent senator since 1978 and Senate Minority Leader (Republican)
- Adele Montgomery (Democratic)

1991 general election
Party	Candidate	Votes	%
Republican	John H. Dorsey (incumbent)	31,268	71.7%
Democratic	Adele Montgomery	12,363	28.3%
Total votes		43,631	100%

== District 26 ==
=== Democratic primary ===
1991 Democratic primary
Party	Candidate	Votes	%
Democratic	Drew Britcher	1,850	100%
Total votes		1,850	100%

=== Republican primary ===
1991 Republican primary
Party	Candidate	Votes	%
Republican	Leanna Brown (incumbent)	8,357	100%
Total votes		8,357	100%

=== General election ===
1991 general election
Party	Candidate	Votes	%
Republican	Leanna Brown (incumbent)	34,063	78.2%
Democratic	Drew Britcher	9,514	21.8%
Total votes		43,577	100%

== District 27 ==
=== Democratic primary ===
1991 Democratic primary
Party	Candidate	Votes	%
Democratic	Richard Codey (incumbent)	8,568	60.89%
Democratic	Mildred Barry Garvin	5,504	39.11%
Total votes		14,072	100%

=== Republican primary ===
1991 Republican primary
Party	Candidate	Votes	%
Republican	Charles F. Cefalu	1,476	100%
Total votes		1,476	100%

=== General election ===
1991 general election
Party	Candidate	Votes	%
Democratic	Richard Codey (incumbent)	19,677	68.1%
Republican	Eugene J. Byrne	9,202	31.9%
Total votes		28,879	100%

== District 28 ==
=== Democratic primary ===
1991 Democratic primary
Party	Candidate	Votes	%
Democratic	Ronald Rice (incumbent)	6,611	100%
Total votes		6,611	100%

=== Republican primary ===
1991 Republican primary
Party	Candidate	Votes	%
Republican	Brenda Jean-Pierre	1,085	100%
Total votes		1,085	100%

=== General election ===
1991 general election
Party	Candidate	Votes	%
Democratic	Ronald Rice (incumbent)	15,456	67.2%
Republican	Brenda Jean-Pierre	6,876	29.9%
Socialist Workers	Rachel H. Knapik	666	2.9%
Total votes		22,998	100%

== District 29 ==
=== Democratic primary ===
1991 Democratic primary
Party	Candidate	Votes	%
Democratic	Wynona Lipman (incumbent)	7,656	100%
Total votes		7,656	100%

=== General election ===
1991 general election
Party	Candidate	Votes	%
Democratic	Wynona Lipman (incumbent)	14,911	100%
Total votes		14,911	100%

== District 30 ==
=== Democratic primary ===
1991 Democratic primary
Party	Candidate	Votes	%
Democratic	Neil J. O'Connell	2,529	100%
Total votes		2,529	100%

=== Republican primary ===
1991 Republican primary
Party	Candidate	Votes	%
Republican	John E. Dimon	3,862	100%
Total votes		3,862	100%

=== General election ===
1991 general election
Party	Candidate	Votes	%
Republican	John E. Dimon	26,651	65.0%
Democratic	Neil J. O’Connell	14,345	35.0%
Total votes		40,996	100%

== District 31 ==
=== Democratic primary ===
1991 Democratic primary
Party	Candidate	Votes	%
Democratic	Edward T. O'Connor Jr. (incumbent)	8,221	100%
Total votes		8,221	100%

=== Republican primary ===
- Bret Schundler, Salomon Brothers investment banker
- Peter Varsalona, United States Marine Corps veteran

Bret Schundler, who served as New Jersey coordinator for Gary Hart's 1984 presidential campaign, switched his party registration to run as a Republican.

1991 Republican primary
Party	Candidate	Votes	%
Republican	Bret Schundler	738	62.60%
Republican	Peter Varsalona	441	37.40%
Total votes		1,179	100%

=== General election ===
1991 general election
Party	Candidate	Votes	%
Democratic	Edward T. O'Connor Jr. (incumbent)	16,719	55.1%
Republican	Bret Schundler	13,601	44.9%
Total votes		30,320	100%

== District 32 ==
=== Democratic primary ===
1991 Democratic primary
Party	Candidate	Votes	%
Democratic	Thomas F. Cowan (incumbent)	10,968	89.58%
Democratic	Ralph Valentin	1,276	10.42%
Total votes		12,244	100%

=== Republican primary ===
1991 Republican primary
Party	Candidate	Votes	%
Republican	Guy Catrillo	1,533	59.74%
Republican	Esmat Zaklama	1,033	40.26%
Total votes		2,566	100%

=== General election ===
1991 general election
Party	Candidate	Votes	%
Democratic	Thomas F. Cowan (incumbent)	21,128	57.1%
Republican	Guy Catrillo	14,577	39.4%
Politicians Are Crooks	Herbert H. Shaw	1,270	3.4%
Total votes		36,975	100%

== District 33 ==
=== Democratic primary ===
1991 Democratic primary
Party	Candidate	Votes	%
Democratic	Bob Menendez	8,005	100%
Total votes		8,005	100%

=== Republican primary ===
1991 Republican primary
Party	Candidate	Votes	%
Republican	Carlos Munoz	1,294	53.03%
Republican	Reinaldo Fernandez	1,146	46.97%
Total votes		2,440	100%

=== General election ===
1991 general election
Party	Candidate	Votes	%
Democratic	Bob Menendez (incumbent)	19,151	68.9%
Republican	Carlos Munoz	8,652	31.1%
Total votes		27,803	100%

== District 34 ==
=== Democratic primary ===
1991 Democratic primary
Party	Candidate	Votes	%
Democratic	Joseph A. Mecca	2,739	100%
Total votes		2,739	100%

=== Republican primary ===
1991 Republican primary
Party	Candidate	Votes	%
Republican	Joseph Bubba (incumbent)	3,395	100%
Total votes		3,395	100%

=== General election ===
- Joseph Bubba, incumbent senator since 1982 (Republican)
- Joseph A. Mecca, Assemblyman from Totowa (Democratic)
- Newton E. Miller, mayor of Wayne and former Assemblyman (Unbossed, Unbiased, Unbought)

Joseph Bubba was seen as a rare vulnerable incumbent Republican, partly due to Mecca's name recognition in the district and the independent candidacy of Republican Wayne mayor Newton Miller.

1991 general election
Party	Candidate	Votes	%
Republican	Joseph Bubba (incumbent)	25,885	52.5%
Democratic	Joseph A. Mecca	17,237	35.0%
Independent	Newton E. Miller	6,193	12.6%
Total votes		49,315	100%

== District 35 ==
=== Democratic primary ===
1991 Democratic primary
Party	Candidate	Votes	%
Democratic	John Girgenti		
Total votes			100%

=== Republican primary ===
- Pat Kramer, former mayor of Paterson
- Walter W. Porter Jr., Passaic County freeholder

1991 Republican primary
Party	Candidate	Votes	%
Republican	Pat Kramer		%
Republican	Walter W. Porter		
Total votes			100%

=== General election ===
- John Girgenti, incumbent senator since 1990 (Democratic)
- Pat Kramer, former mayor of Paterson (Republican)

Because one of the district's two Assembly members, Frank Catania, was a Republican, this district was seen as potentially competitive before the primary. Girgenti had won a special district party convention in 1990 to fill the seat left vacant by Senator Frank X. Graves Jr.

1991 general election
Party	Candidate	Votes	%
Democratic	John Girgenti	15,859	53.2%
Republican	Pat Kramer	13,965	46.8%
Total votes		29,824	100%

== District 36 ==
=== Democratic primary ===
1991 Democratic primary
Party	Candidate	Votes	%
Democratic	Gabriel M. Ambrosio (incumbent)	3,987	100%
Total votes		3,987	100%

=== Republican primary ===
1991 Republican primary
Party	Candidate	Votes	%
Republican	John P. Scott	2,077	100%
Total votes		2,077	100%

=== General election ===
1991 general election
Party	Candidate	Votes	%
Republican	John P. Scott	21,455	52.0%
Democratic	Gabriel M. Ambrosio (incumbent)	19,775	48.0%
Total votes		41,230	100%

== District 37 ==
=== Democratic primary ===
1991 Democratic primary
Party	Candidate	Votes	%
Democratic	Matthew Feldman	3,358	100%
Total votes		3,358	100%

=== Republican primary ===
1991 Republican primary
Party	Candidate	Votes	%
Republican	Todd Caliguire	1,690	100%
Total votes		1,690	100%

=== General election ===
- Todd Caliguire, former aide to Thomas Kean and W. Cary Edwards (Republican)
- Matthew Feldman, incumbent senator since 1974 (Note: Feldman previously served in the Senate from 1966 to 1968.) and former Senate President (Democratic)

1991 general election
Party	Candidate	Votes	%
Democratic	Matthew Feldman (incumbent)	24,309	53.6%
Republican	Todd Caliguire	21,045	46.4%
Total votes		45,354	100%

== District 38 ==
=== Democratic primary ===
1991 Democratic primary
Party	Candidate	Votes	%
Democratic	Paul Contillo	3,215	100%
Total votes		3,215	100%

=== Republican primary ===
1991 Republican primary
Party	Candidate	Votes	%
Republican	Louis F. Kosco	2,891	100%
Total votes		2,891	100%

=== General election ===
Though all of the Bergen County districts were considered difficult to handicap due to redistricting, the 38th district was seen as among the closest, despite the fact that incumbent Paul Contillo voted against the Florio tax program.

1991 general election
Party	Candidate	Votes	%
Republican	Louis F. Kosco	27,748	55.4%
Democratic	Paul Contillo (incumbent)	20,572	41.1%
Taxpayers Only Choice	C. Fischer	1,773	3.5%
Total votes		50,093	100%

== District 39 ==
=== Democratic primary ===
1991 Democratic primary
Party	Candidate	Votes	%
Democratic	Mary Donohue	1,781	100%
Total votes		1,781	100%

=== Republican primary ===
1991 Republican primary
Party	Candidate	Votes	%
Republican	Gerald Cardinale (incumbent)	3,066	100%
Total votes		3,066	100%

=== General election ===
1991 general election
Party	Candidate	Votes	%
Republican	Gerald Cardinale (incumbent)	37,135	66.9%
Democratic	Mary Donohue	18,336	33.1%
Total votes		55,471	100%

== District 40 ==
=== Democratic primary ===
1991 Democratic primary
Party	Candidate	Votes	%
Democratic	Frank R. Lucas Jr.	1,560	100%
Total votes		1,560	100%

=== Republican primary ===
1991 Republican primary
Party	Candidate	Votes	%
Republican	Henry McNamara (incumbent)	3,781	100%
Total votes		3,781	100%

=== General election ===
1991 general election
Party	Candidate	Votes	%
Republican	Henry McNamara (incumbent)	36,666	75.5%
Democratic	Frank R. Lucas	11,884	24.5%
Total votes		48,550	100%

== See also ==
- 1991 New Jersey General Assembly election
