= Alfred E. Steele =

American politician (born 1954)

Member of the New Jersey General Assembly from the 35th Legislative District
- In office January 9, 1996 – September 10, 2007 Serving with Bill Pascrell and Nellie Pou
- Preceded by: Donald Hayden
- Succeeded by: Elease Evans

Personal details
- Born: January 22, 1954 (age 72)
- Party: Democratic
- Education: Northeastern Bible College

Alfred E. Steele (born January 22, 1954) is an American Baptist clergyman and Democratic Party politician, who served in the New Jersey General Assembly starting in 1996, where he represented the 35th legislative district. He resigned on September 10, 2007, in the wake of his arrest the previous week on corruption charges.

He had been the Assembly's Deputy Speaker since 2002 and was the Assistant Minority Leader from 1998 to 2001. In the Assembly, Steele served as Vice Chair of the Regulatory Oversight Committee, and also serves on the Budget Committee and the Law and Public Safety Committee. In the past, he had served as Chair of the Assembly's State Government Committee and on the Financial Institutions and Insurance Committee.

Steele has served as Chaplain in the Passaic County Jail from 1990 to 1994, a position he is currently holding. He also served as Councilman and Council President on the Paterson City Council.

Steele graduated with a Bachelor of Theology from Northeastern Bible College. He is the Pastor of Seminary Baptist Church in Paterson, New Jersey.

== 2007 Corruption charges ==
Steele was arrested by the FBI on September 6, 2007, in a Federal corruption probe that also included the arrests of Assemblyman and Orange mayor Mims Hackett and Passaic Mayor Samuel Rivera. The charges are that Steele accepted $14,000 in bribes to steer insurance brokers new business from Newark, Orange, Passaic and Paterson, where he allegedly boasted that he could secure the business as he "had five votes on the City Council." On September 7, 2007, Governor of New Jersey Jon Corzine called on both Steele and Hackett to resign from their seats in the New Jersey Legislature.

Steele submitted his letter of resignation from his Assembly seat on September 10, 2007; Hackett filed a resignation letter that same day. In resigning before September 17, 2007, the Democratic Party would be able to put an alternate on the November ballot in lieu of Steele.

== District 35 ==
Each of the forty districts in the New Jersey Legislature has one representative in the New Jersey Senate and two members in the New Jersey General Assembly. The other representatives from the 35th Legislative District are:

- Assemblywoman Nellie Pou, and
- Senator John Girgenti
