= Vincent O. Pellecchia =

American politician

Member of the New Jersey General Assembly from the 35th Legislative District
- In office January 8, 1974 – January 12, 1988 Serving with William H. Hicks, Ronald Fava and John Girgenti
- Preceded by: District created
- Succeeded by: Bill Pascrell

Member of the New Jersey General Assembly from the 14th at-large district
- In office January 11, 1972 – January 8, 1974
- Preceded by: John F. Evers
- Succeeded by: District abolished

Personal details
- Born: February 14, 1916 Paterson, New Jersey
- Died: February 17, 1989 (aged 73)
- Party: Democratic

Vincent O. Pellecchia (February 14, 1916 – February 17, 1989) was an American politician who served in the New Jersey General Assembly from 1972 to 1988, representing the District 14 at-large seat in his first term of office and the 35th Legislative District starting in 1974, when the 40-district map was implemented.
