= Ronald Fava =

American politician

Member of the New Jersey General Assembly from the 35th district
- In office January 13, 1976 – January 10, 1978 Serving with Vincent O. Pellecchia
- Preceded by: William H. Hicks
- Succeeded by: John Girgenti

Personal details
- Born: March 14, 1949 (age 77) Paterson, New Jersey
- Party: Republican

Ronald Fava (born March 14, 1949) is an American politician who served in the New Jersey General Assembly from the 35th Legislative District from 1976 to 1978. He ran for Passaic County Clerk in 2018, but lost to Danielle Ireland-Imhof.
