= Shavonda E. Sumter =

Member of the New Jersey General Assembly

Shavonda Sumter
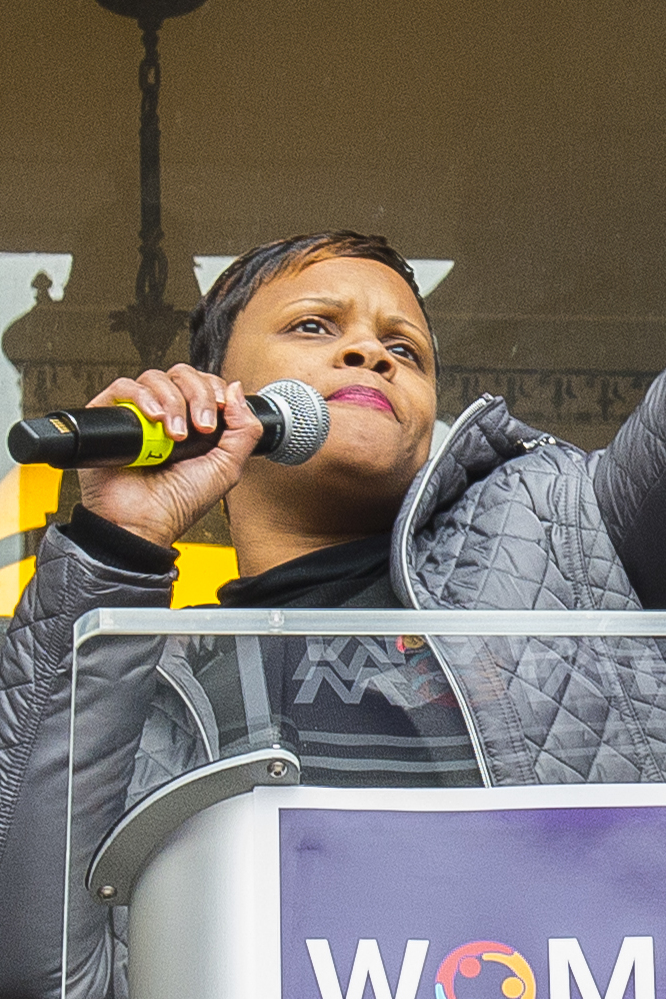

Member of the New Jersey General Assembly from the 35th district
- In office January 10, 2012 – January 13, 2026 Serving with Al Abdelaziz
- Preceded by: Elease Evans; Nellie Pou
- Succeeded by: Kenyatta Stewart

Personal details
- Born: January 19, 1974 (age 51) Paterson, New Jersey, U.S.
- Party: Democratic
- Spouse: Kenneth Sumter
- Children: 2
- Education: Kean University (BA); Fairleigh Dickinson University (MBA)
- Website: State Assembly website

Shavonda E. Sumter (born January 19, 1974) is an American Democratic Party politician who represented the 35th Legislative District in the New Jersey General Assembly from 2012 to 2026.

In February 2025, Sumter announced that she would not be running in the 2025 New Jersey General Assembly election.

== Personal ==
Sumter was born in Paterson, New Jersey, the daughter of Charles and Bonnie Williams. She attended public and private schools in Paterson, Prospect Park, and Haledon. She graduated from Kean University in 1996 with a B.A. degree in political science. She earned an M.B.A. degree in health care administration from Fairleigh Dickinson University. Sumter has worked in health services and currently serves as director of behavioral health services at Mountainside Medical Center in Glen Ridge.

Sumter has served on the New Jersey Democratic State Committee since 2008. She was one of the members of the electoral college who cast a ballot for Barack Obama and Joe Biden after the 2008 presidential election. In 2010, Sumter was the campaign manager for Jeffery Jones in his successful campaign for Mayor of Paterson.

As of September 2016, Sumter was considering a run for the Democratic nomination for governor in 2017, and was also considered the leading candidate for selection as the party's candidate for lieutenant governor. However, the eventual Democratic nominee for governor, Phil Murphy, chose Assemblywoman Sheila Oliver as his running mate.

In 2024, following the death of Congressman Bill Pascrell, Sumter briefly campaigned to be the replacement Democratic candidate for the U.S. House of Representatives election for New Jersey's 9th congressional district, but eventually withdrew.

A resident of North Haledon, she is married to Kenneth Sumter and has two children: Tyler (1998) and Kenneth Jr. (2000)

== New Jersey General Assembly ==
In the 2011 New Jersey General Assembly election, there were two open Assembly seats in the 35th District, after Nellie Pou decided to run for the State Senate and Elease Evans retired. Sumter and her running mate, Benjie E. Wimberly, defeated the Republican candidates, William Connolly and Donna Puglisi. She was sworn in on January 10, 2012. She held the leadership positions in the Assembly of Majority Conference Leader from 2015 to 2019 and was Deputy Speaker from 2014 to 2015.

=== Committees ===
Committee assignments for the 2024—2025 Legislative Session are:

- Community Development and Women's Affairs (as chair)
- Environment, Natural Resources, and Solid Waste (as vice-chair)
- Labor

=== District 35 ===
Each of the 40 districts in the New Jersey Legislature has one representative in the New Jersey Senate and two members in the New Jersey General Assembly. The representatives from the 35th District for the 2024—2025 Legislative Session are:

- Senator Benjie Wimberly (D)
- Assemblyman Al Abdelaziz (D)
- Assemblywoman Shavonda E. Sumter (D)

== Electoral history ==
35th Legislative District General Election, 2023
Party	Candidate	Votes	%
Democratic	Benjie Wimberly (incumbent)	12,320	50.2
Democratic	Shavonda Sumter (incumbent)	12,214	49.8
Total votes		24,534	100.0
Democratic hold			
Democratic hold			

35th legislative district general election, 2021
Party	Candidate	Votes	%
Democratic	Benjie Wimberly (incumbent)	20,276	34.56%
Democratic	Shavonda Sumter (incumbent)	20,235	34.49%
Republican	Ramzy Yamisha	9,166	15.62%
Republican	Iman Majagah	8,990	15.32%
Total votes		58,667	100.0
Democratic hold			

35th Legislative District General Election, 2019
Party	Candidate	Votes	%
Democratic	Benjie Wimberly (incumbent)	13,213	43.61%
Democratic	Shavonda Sumter (incumbent)	13,173	43.48%
Republican	Tamer Mamkej	3,909	12.9%
Total votes		30,295	100%

New Jersey General Assembly
Preceded by Elease Evans; Nellie Pou	Member of the New Jersey General Assembly from the 35th district 2012–2026; Served alongside: Benjie E. Wimberly, Al Abdelaziz	Succeeded by Kenyatta Stewart
