= Elease Evans =

American Democratic Party politician

Member of the New Jersey General Assembly from the 35th Legislative District
- In office November 9, 2007 – January 10, 2012 Serving with Nellie Pou
- Preceded by: Alfred E. Steele
- Succeeded by: Benjie E. Wimberly; Shavonda E. Sumter

Personal details
- Born: June 6, 1943 (age 83)
- Party: Democratic

Elease Evans (born June 6, 1943) is an American Democratic Party politician who served in the New Jersey General Assembly from November 2007 until January 2012, representing the 35th legislative district. Evans held a seat that was vacated by former Assemblyman Alfred E. Steele on September 10, 2007. She was first sworn into the Assembly on November 9, 2007.

Evans served on the Passaic County Board of Chosen Freeholders starting in 2002 and was selected by her fellow Freeholders to serve as Freeholder Director since 2004. On January 2, 2007, Evans was unanimously chosen to serve a fourth term as Freeholder Director.

As Freeholder Director, Evans earned an $1,000 on top of her $28,500 annual freeholder salary, presided over public meetings and was responsible for appointing board members to committees.

She simultaneously held a seat in the New Jersey General Assembly and as Freeholder. This dual position, often called double dipping, is allowed under a grandfather clause in the state law enacted by the New Jersey Legislature and signed into law by Governor of New Jersey Jon Corzine in September 2007 that prevents dual-office-holding but allows those who had held both positions as of February 1, 2008, to retain both posts. She did not seek re-election to her Freeholder seat in 2007, though.

== Biography ==
Evans served in the Assembly on the Labor Committee (as vice-chair), the Human Services Committee and the Law and Public Safety Committee.

Evans is a graduate of Passaic County Vocational and Technical High School (now the Passaic County Technical Institute). She attended William Paterson College (now William Paterson University) where she majored in Sociology and was inducted into the Sociology Honor Society. Evans also received her Certification in Life Skills / Career Counseling from Columbia University.

Evans spent 33 years at the Passaic County Board of Social Services before retiring in 2002, after her election to the Passaic County Board of Chosen Freeholders. At the Passaic County Board of Social Services, Evans started as a clerk/typist position and was promoted to Senior Training Technician. While at the Board of Social Services, Evans served 24 years as the Vice President of the Professional Workers Association.

Evans currently serves on the Boards of the YMCA of Clifton & Passaic and Eva's Shelter in Paterson, and as a Commissioner of the Paterson Parking Authority. She has previously served as President of the Paterson branch of the NAACP, as chair of the board of directors for the Greater Paterson OIC, and as a member of the Mayor's Task Force on Crime and Drugs. She has been an active member of the Calvary Baptist Church in Paterson since 1979, and has served her church in many capacities including Sunday school teacher, usher, and member of both their Civil Rights Commission and Board of Christian Education.

Evans and her husband Billie are longtime residents of Paterson's Eastside. Evans is a mother of two sons, Don and Patrick, and daughter, Karen, and is also a grandmother of nine.

Evans did not run for re-election to the Assembly in 2011, thereby ending her service to the legislature effective January 9, 2012.
