= Benjie Wimberly =

Member of the New Jersey General Assembly

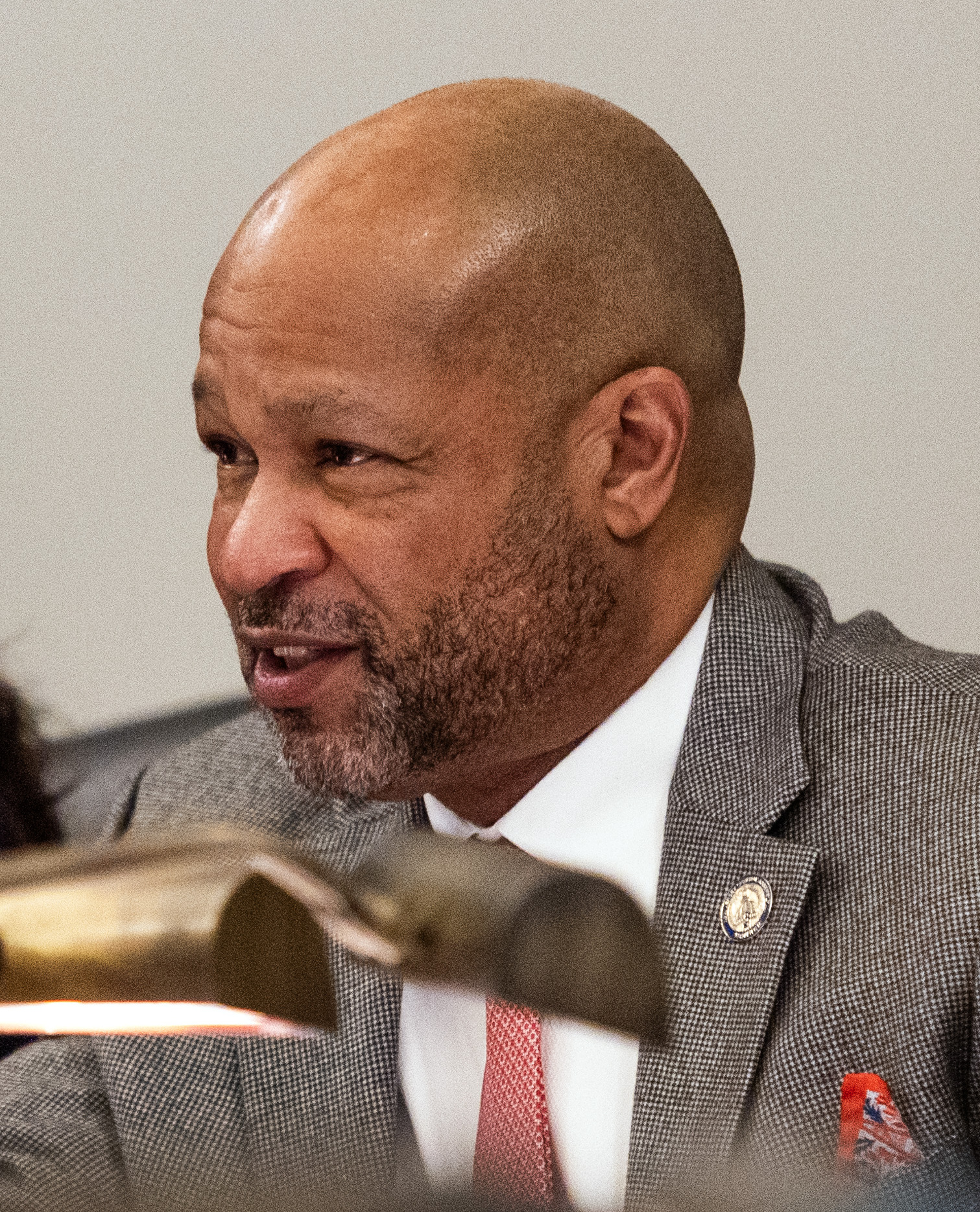

Member of the New Jersey Senate from the 35th district
- Incumbent
- Assumed office January 30, 2025
- Preceded by: Nellie Pou

Speaker pro tempore of the New Jersey General Assembly
- In office January 11, 2022 – January 16, 2025
- Preceded by: Gordon M. Johnson
- Succeeded by: Annette Quijano

Member of the New Jersey General Assembly from the 35th district
- In office January 10, 2012 – January 16, 2025 Serving with Shavonda E. Sumter
- Preceded by: Elease Evans; Nellie Pou
- Succeeded by: Al Abdelaziz

Personal details
- Born: December 1, 1964 (age 61) Paterson, New Jersey, U.S.
- Party: Democratic
- Spouse: Kimberlynn
- Children: 4
- Education: Virginia State University (BA)
- Website: Assembly website

Benjie E. Wimberly (born December 1, 1964) is an American teacher and Democratic Party politician who is the member of the New Jersey Senate from the 35th district since 2025. He previously represented the 35th Legislative District in the New Jersey General Assembly from 2012 to 2025. He was also the head coach of the football team at Hackensack High School and is serving as the recreation director of Paterson.

== Education ==
Wimberly graduated from Passaic County Technical Institute in Wayne, and Virginia State University where he received a Bachelor of Arts degree in sociology.

== Football coach ==
Wimberly was an assistant coach for Eastside High School in Paterson from 1989 through 1994. He then served as the head coach of the football team at Paterson Catholic High School from 1995 through 2010, when the school ceased operations. In his last seven years at Paterson Catholic, Wimberly amassed a 70–3 win–loss record, and mentored Victor Cruz. During his 16 years as coach, Paterson Catholic won seven state championships. Wimberly became the head coach of the football team at Hackensack High School in 2012, succeeding Mike Miello. He is also serving as Paterson's Recreation Director.

== Elective office ==
In 2010, Wimberly was elected to the Paterson city council. Several of his former students volunteered for his campaign, as he courted the youth vote in a method similar to Barack Obama during the 2008 presidential election.

Wimberly won election to the New Jersey General Assembly in 2011, and was reelected in 2013.

Wimberly considered a run for mayor of Paterson in the 2014 election.

In 2020, he was one of the co-sponsors of Assembly Bill 4454 (now N.J.S.A. 18A:35-4.36a) which requires that a curriculum on diversity and inclusion be part of the school curriculum for students in kindergarten through twelfth grade.

In 2024, following the death of Congressman Bill Pascrell, Wimberly briefly campaigned to be the replacement Democratic candidate for the U.S. House of Representatives election for New Jersey's 9th congressional district, but eventually withdrew.

On January 16, 2025, Wimberly was elected to fill the vacant Senate seat held by Nellie Pou, defeating his Assembly running mate Shavonda E. Sumter at a special convention by a 1-vote margin. He will serve until the winner of a November special election is certified.

=== Committee assignments ===
Committee assignments for the 2024—2025 Legislative Session are:

- Budget (as vice-chair)
- Higher Education
- Housing

=== District 35 ===
Each of the 40 districts in the New Jersey Legislature has one representative in the New Jersey Senate and two members in the New Jersey General Assembly. The representatives from the 35th District for the 2024—2025 Legislative Session are:

- Senator Benjie Wimberly (D)
- Assemblyman Al Abdelaziz (D)
- Assemblywoman Shavonda E. Sumter (D)

== Electoral history ==
35th Legislative District General Election, 2023
Party	Candidate	Votes	%
Democratic	Benjie E. Wimberly (incumbent)	12,320	50.2
Democratic	Shavonda Sumter (incumbent)	12,214	49.8
Total votes		24,534	100.0
Democratic hold			
Democratic hold			

35th legislative district general election, 2021
Party	Candidate	Votes	%
Democratic	Benjie Wimberly (incumbent)	20,276	34.56%
Democratic	Shavonda Sumter (incumbent)	20,235	34.49%
Republican	Ramzy Yamisha	9,166	15.62%
Republican	Iman Majagah	8,990	15.32%
Total votes		58,667	100.0
Democratic hold			

35th Legislative District General Election, 2019
Party	Candidate	Votes	%
Democratic	Benjie Wimberly (incumbent)	13,213	43.61%
Democratic	Shavonda Sumter (incumbent)	13,173	43.48%
Republican	Tamer Mamkej	3,909	12.9%
Total votes		30,295	100%

== Personal life ==
Wimberly and his wife, Kimberlyn, have four children. His oldest son Justin played high school football for Don Bosco Preparatory High School in Ramsey, New Jersey.

New Jersey General Assembly
Preceded by Gordon M. Johnson	Speaker pro tempore of the New Jersey General Assembly; 2022–2025	Succeeded by Annette Quijano
