= Benjie =

Benjie is a given name. Notable people with the name include:

- Benjie Paras (born 1968), Filipino actor, comedian, basketball player, and coach
- Benjie E. Wimberly (born 1964), American teacher and politician
