= New Jersey's 35th legislative district =

American legislative district

- Senator: Benjie Wimberly (D)
- Assembly members: Al Abdelaziz (D); Kenyatta Stewart (D)
- Registration: 48.4% Democratic; 11.6% Republican; 38.2% unaffiliated
- Demographics: 27.1% White; 19.4% Black/African American; 1.2% Native American; 5.4% Asian; 0.0% Hawaiian/Pacific Islander; 33.3% Other race; 13.5% Two or more races; 53.3% Hispanic
- Population: 238,160
- Voting-age population: 179,831
- Registered voters: 132,960

New Jersey's 35th legislative district is one of 40 districts that make up the map for the New Jersey Legislature. It encompasses the Bergen County municipalities of Elmwood Park and Garfield and the Passaic County municipalities of Haledon, North Haledon, Paterson, and Prospect Park.

== Demographic information ==
As of the 2020 United States census, the district had a population of 238,160, of whom 179,831 (75.5%) were of voting age. The racial makeup of the district was 64,563 (27.1%) White, 46,103 (19.4%) African American, 2,962 (1.2%) Native American, 12,901 (5.4%) Asian, 96 (0.0%) Pacific Islander, 79,289 (33.3%) from some other race, and 32,246 (13.5%) from two or more races. Hispanic or Latino of any race were 126,899 (53.3%) of the population.

The district had 132,960 registered voters as of December 1, 2023, of whom 62,260 (46.8%) were registered as Democrats, 51,875 (39.0%) were registered as unaffiliated, 16,560 (12.5%) were registered as Republicans, and 2,265 (1.7%) were registered to other parties.

== Political representation ==
For the 2026–2027 session, the 35th legislative district of the New Jersey Legislature is represented in the State Senate by Benjie Wimberly (D, Paterson) and in the General Assembly by Al Abdelaziz (D, Paterson) and Kenyatta Stewart (D, Paterson).

The legislative district is located entirely within New Jersey's 9th congressional district congressional district.

== Apportionment history ==
The 35th district has been based around Paterson since its creation in 1973. The 1973 through 1981 version of the district included Paterson, Prospect Park, Hawthorne, and North Haledon. A slight shift in the district occurred in the 1981 redistricting when North Haledon was removed, and Haledon and Elmwood Park were added. West Paterson was added and North Haledon was re-added to the district in the 1991 redistricting. In the 2001 redistricting, West Paterson swapped places with Totowa and Bergen County borough Glen Rock was added.

== Election history ==
Session	Senate	General Assembly	
1974–1975	Frank Davenport (R)	Vincent O. Pellecchia (D)	William H. Hicks (D)
1976–1977	Frank Davenport (R)	Vincent O. Pellecchia (D)	Ronald Fava (R)
1978–1979	Frank X. Graves Jr. (D)	Vincent O. Pellecchia (D)	John Girgenti (D)
1980–1981	Frank X. Graves Jr. (D)	Vincent O. Pellecchia (D)	John Girgenti (D)
1982–1983	Frank X. Graves Jr. (D)	Vincent O. Pellecchia (D)	John Girgenti (D)
1984–1985	Frank X. Graves Jr. (D)	Vincent O. Pellecchia (D)	John Girgenti (D)
1986–1987	Frank X. Graves Jr. (D)	Vincent O. Pellecchia (D)	John Girgenti (D)
1988–1989	Frank X. Graves Jr. (D) (Note: Died March 4, 1990)	Bill Pascrell (D)	John Girgenti (D)
1990–1991	Frank X. Graves Jr. (D)	Bill Pascrell (D)	John Girgenti (D) (Note: Appointed to the Senate on April 5, 1990, elected to remainder of unexpired term in November 1990)
1990–1991	John Girgenti (D)	Bill Pascrell (D)	Cyril Yannarelli (D) (Note: Appointed to the Assembly on May 17, 1990, defeated in November 1990 special election)
1990–1991	John Girgenti (D)	Bill Pascrell (D)	Frank Catania (R) (Note: Elected November 1990 special election and sworn into the Assembly shortly thereafter)
1992–1993	John Girgenti (D)	Bill Pascrell (D)	Frank Catania (R)
1994–1995	John Girgenti (D)	Bill Pascrell (D)	Frank Catania (R) (Note: Resigned on September 23, 1994 to become director of Division of Gaming Enforcement)
1994–1995	John Girgenti (D)	Bill Pascrell (D)	Donald Hayden (R) (Note: Appointed to the Assembly in 1994)
1996–1997	John Girgenti (D)	Bill Pascrell (D) (Note: Resigned on January 3, 1997 after being elected to Congress)	Alfred E. Steele (D)
1996–1997	John Girgenti (D)	Nellie Pou (D) (Note: Appointed to the Assembly on January 29, 1997)	Alfred E. Steele (D)
1998–1999	John Girgenti (D)	Nellie Pou (D)	Alfred E. Steele (D)
2000–2001	John Girgenti (D)	Nellie Pou (D)	Alfred E. Steele (D)
2002–2003	John Girgenti (D)	Nellie Pou (D)	Alfred E. Steele (D)
2004–2005	John Girgenti (D)	Nellie Pou (D)	Alfred E. Steele (D)
2006–2007	John Girgenti (D)	Nellie Pou (D)	Alfred E. Steele (D) (Note: Resigned on September 10, 2007)
2006–2007	John Girgenti (D)	Nellie Pou (D)	Elease Evans (D) (Note: Appointed to the Assembly on November 9, 2007)
2008–2009	John Girgenti (D)	Nellie Pou (D)	Elease Evans (D)
2010–2011	John Girgenti (D)	Nellie Pou (D)	Elease Evans (D)
2012–2013	Nellie Pou (D)	Benjie E. Wimberly (D)	Shavonda E. Sumter (D)
2014–2015	Nellie Pou (D)	Benjie E. Wimberly (D)	Shavonda E. Sumter (D)
2016–2017	Nellie Pou (D)	Benjie E. Wimberly (D)	Shavonda E. Sumter (D)
2018–2019	Nellie Pou (D)	Benjie E. Wimberly (D)	Shavonda E. Sumter (D)
2020–2021	Nellie Pou (D)	Benjie E. Wimberly (D)	Shavonda E. Sumter (D)
2022–2023	Nellie Pou (D)	Benjie E. Wimberly (D)	Shavonda E. Sumter (D)
2024–2025	Nellie Pou (D) (Note: Resigned on January 1, 2025 after being elected to Congress)	Benjie E. Wimberly (D) (Note: Resigned from the Assembly on January 12, 2025 and appointed to the State Senate on January 30, 2025)	Shavonda E. Sumter (D)
2024–2025	Benjie E. Wimberly (D)	Al Abdelaziz (D) (Note: Appointed to the Assembly on January 22, 2025)	Shavonda E. Sumter (D)
2026–2027	Benjie E. Wimberly (D)	Al Abdelaziz (D)	Kenyatta Stewart (D)

== Election results ==
=== Senate ===
2021 New Jersey general election
Party	Candidate	Votes	%	±%
Democratic	Nelida Pou	20,464	68.6	▼10.4
Republican	Kenneth Pengitore	9,372	31.4	▲10.4
Total votes		29,836	100.0	

New Jersey general election, 2017
Party	Candidate	Votes	%	±%
Democratic	Nelida Pou	21,425	79.0	▲4.9
Republican	Marwan Sholakh	5,698	21.0	▼4.9
Total votes		27,123	100.0	

New Jersey general election, 2013
Party	Candidate	Votes	%	±%
Democratic	Nellie Pou	22,154	74.1	▼0.6
Republican	Lynda Gallashaw	7,737	25.9	▲0.6
Total votes		29,891	100.0	

2011 New Jersey general election
Party	Candidate	Votes	%
Democratic	Nellie Pou	14,386	74.7
Republican	Ken Pengitore	4,867	25.3
Total votes		19,253	100.0

2007 New Jersey general election
Party	Candidate	Votes	%	±%
Democratic	John A. Girgenti	14,265	100.0	▲31.4
Total votes		14,265	100.0	

2003 New Jersey general election
Party	Candidate	Votes	%	±%
Democratic	John A. Girgenti	16,243	68.6	▼31.4
Republican	David R. Troast	7,434	31.4	N/A
Total votes		23,677	100.0	

2001 New Jersey general election
Party	Candidate	Votes	%
Democratic	John A. Girgenti	25,844	100.0
Total votes		25,844	100.0

1997 New Jersey general election
Party	Candidate	Votes	%	±%
Democratic	John A. Girgenti	24,552	69.8	▲3.3
Republican	Brian A. Duncan	10,644	30.2	▼1.9
Total votes		35,196	100.0	

1993 New Jersey general election
Party	Candidate	Votes	%	±%
Democratic	John A. Girgenti	21,836	66.5	▲13.3
Republican	Beltran Lopez	10,550	32.1	▼14.7
Independent	Vijay “Viji” Sargis	442	1.3	N/A
Total votes		32,828	100.0	

1991 New Jersey general election
Party	Candidate	Votes	%
Democratic	John A. Girgenti	15,859	53.2
Republican	Lawrence (Pat) Kramer	13,965	46.8
Total votes		29,824	100.0

Special election, 1990
Party	Candidate	Votes	%	±%
Democratic	John A. Girgenti	15,454	100.0	0.0
Total votes		15,454	100.0	

1987 New Jersey general election
Party	Candidate	Votes	%	±%
Democratic	Frank X. Graves Jr.	21,793	100.0	▲25.7
Total votes		21,793	100.0	

1983 New Jersey general election
Party	Candidate	Votes	%	±%
Democratic	Frank X. Graves Jr.	23,646	74.3	▼0.3
Republican	Richard Fontanella	8,161	25.7	▲0.3
Total votes		31,807	100.0	

1981 New Jersey general election
Party	Candidate	Votes	%
Democratic	Frank X. Graves Jr.	28,439	74.6
Republican	Frank E. Gorman	9,693	25.4
Total votes		38,132	100.0

1977 New Jersey general election
Party	Candidate	Votes	%	±%
Democratic	Frank X. Graves Jr.	17,005	56.2	▲6.3
Republican	Alfred Fontanella	12,193	40.3	▼9.8
Tax Revolt Independent	Joseph S. Long	547	1.8	N/A
Independent Progressive Conservative	Roy L. Ward	500	1.7	N/A
Total votes		30,245	100.0	

1973 New Jersey general election
Party	Candidate	Votes	%
Republican	Frank Davenport	16,919	50.14
Democratic	Joseph A. Lazzara	16,826	49.86
Total votes		33,745	100.0

=== General Assembly ===
2021 New Jersey general election
Party	Candidate	Votes	%	±%
Democratic	Benjie E. Wimberly	20,276	34.6	▼8.9
Democratic	Shavonda Sumter	20,235	34.5	▼8.9
Republican	Ramzy Yamisha	9,166	15.6	▲2.5
Republican	Iman Majagah	8,990	15.3	N/A
Total votes		58,667	100.0	

2019 New Jersey general election
Party	Candidate	Votes	%	±%
Democratic	Benjie E. Wimberly	14,089	43.5	▲3.5
Democratic	Shavonda E. Sumter	14,033	43.4	▲3.6
Republican	Tamer Mamkej	4,241	13.1	▲2.9
Total votes		32,363	100.0	

New Jersey general election, 2017
Party	Candidate	Votes	%	±%
Democratic	Benjie E. Wimberly	21,406	40.0	▲3.6
Democratic	Shavonda E. Sumter	21,275	39.8	▲3.4
Republican	Ibrahim Mahmoud	5,435	10.2	▼3.6
Republican	Nihad Younes	5,366	10.0	▼3.3
Total votes		53,482	100.0	

New Jersey general election, 2015
Party	Candidate	Votes	%	±%
Democratic	Benjie E. Wimberly	11,905	36.4	▼0.3
Democratic	Shavonda E. Sumter	11,904	36.4	▲0.4
Republican	David Jimenez	4,522	13.8	0.0
Republican	Ilia Villanueva	4,333	13.3	▼0.2
Total votes		32,664	100.0	

New Jersey general election, 2013
Party	Candidate	Votes	%	±%
Democratic	Benjie E. Wimberly	21,195	36.7	▼0.1
Democratic	Shavonda E. Sumter	20,791	36.0	▲0.3
Republican	Rhina Tavarez	7,968	13.8	▼0.1
Republican	Maria del Pilar Rivas	7,828	13.5	▼0.1
Total votes		57,782	100.0	

New Jersey general election, 2011
Party	Candidate	Votes	%
Democratic	Benjie E. Wimberly	13,551	36.8
Democratic	Shavonda E. Sumter	13,143	35.7
Republican	Donna Puglisi	5,114	13.9
Republican	William A. Connolly	5,020	13.6
Total votes		36,828	100.0

New Jersey general election, 2009
Party	Candidate	Votes	%	±%
Democratic	Nellie Pou	22,148	32.4	▼6.5
Democratic	Elease Evans	21,637	31.7	▼7.1
Republican	Lynn Anne Shortway	12,488	18.3	▼3.9
Republican	George Sawey	11,993	17.6	N/A
Total votes		68,266	100.0	

New Jersey general election, 2007
Party	Candidate	Votes	%	±%
Democratic	Nellie Pou	11,784	38.9	▲4.6
Democratic	Elease Evans	11,749	38.8	▲4.0
Republican	Chauncey I. Brown III	6,730	22.2	▲6.8
Total votes		30,263	100.0	

New Jersey general election, 2005
Party	Candidate	Votes	%	±%
Democratic	Alfred Steele	23,747	34.8	▲2.0
Democratic	Nellie Pou	23,372	34.3	▲2.4
Republican	Deborah Shortway	10,477	15.4	▼2.7
Republican	Rinaldo M. D'Argenio	10,397	15.2	▼2.0
Libertarian	Louis R. Jasikoff	191	0.3	N/A
Total votes		68,184	100.0	

New Jersey general election, 2003
Party	Candidate	Votes	%	±%
Democratic	Alfred Steele	14,658	32.8	▼18.4
Democratic	Nellie Pou	14,299	31.9	▼16.9
Republican	Kenneth N. Del Vecchio Jr	8,120	18.1	N/A
Republican	Thomas F.X. Magura	7,680	17.2	N/A
Total votes		44,757	100.0	

New Jersey general election, 2001
Party	Candidate	Votes	%
Democratic	Alfred E. Steele	24,880	51.2
Democratic	Nellie Pou	23,728	48.8
Total votes		48,608	100.0

New Jersey general election, 1999
Party	Candidate	Votes	%	±%
Democratic	Alfred Steele	14,223	33.4	▲2.2
Democratic	Nellie Pou	13,902	32.6	▲3.0
Republican	William A. DeStefano	7,424	17.4	▼2.4
Republican	Belinda A. Lanier	7,032	16.5	▼2.9
Total votes		42,581	100.0	

New Jersey general election, 1997
Party	Candidate	Votes	%	±%
Democratic	Alfred Steele	23,253	31.2	▲4.6
Democratic	Nellie Pou	22,112	29.6	▼3.7
Republican	Karole A. Graves	14,785	19.8	▼1.8
Republican	Frank Catania, Jr.	14,465	19.4	▲0.9
Total votes		74,615	100.0	

New Jersey general election, 1995
Party	Candidate	Votes	%	±%
Democratic	William J. Pascrell, Jr.	17,400	33.3	▲1.9
Democratic	Rev. Alfred E. Steele	13,868	26.6	▲3.8
Republican	Donald Hayden	11,267	21.6	▼3.9
Republican	Dennis Gonzalez	9,685	18.5	▲2.6
Total votes		52,220	100.0	

New Jersey general election, 1993
Party	Candidate	Votes	%	±%
Democratic	William J. Pascrell, Jr.	21,698	31.4	▲2.6
Republican	Frank Catania	17,657	25.5	▲0.8
Democratic	Alfred Steele	15,745	22.8	▼0.8
Republican	Harvey Nutter	10,999	15.9	▼7.0
Unified Independents	Anna N. Taliaferro	1,568	2.3	N/A
Time for Change	James A. Davis, Jr.	1,531	2.2	N/A
Total votes		69,198	100.0	

1991 New Jersey general election
Party	Candidate	Votes	%
Democratic	William J. Pascrell, Jr.	17,394	28.8
Republican	Frank Catania	14,894	24.7
Democratic	Eli M. Burgos	14,266	23.6
Republican	Martin G. Barnes	13,848	22.9
Total votes		60,402	100.0

Special election, 1990
Party	Candidate	Votes	%
Republican	Frank Catania	13,591	56.1
Democratic	Cyril R. Yannarelli	10,633	43.9
Total votes		24,224	100.0

1989 New Jersey general election
Party	Candidate	Votes	%	±%
Democratic	John A. Girgenti	24,359	37.0	▲1.4
Democratic	William J. Pascrell, Jr.	23,633	35.9	▲1.6
Republican	Joaquin Calcines, Jr.	9,093	13.8	▼2.8
Republican	Jose L. Moore	8,707	13.2	▼0.3
Total votes		65,792	100.0	

1987 New Jersey general election
Party	Candidate	Votes	%	±%
Democratic	John A. Girgenti	18,345	35.6	▲5.4
Democratic	William J. Pascrell, Jr.	17,670	34.3	▲8.0
Republican	Martin G. Barnes	8,546	16.6	▼5.3
Republican	Robert Angele	6,955	13.5	▼8.1
Total votes		51,516	100.0	

1985 New Jersey general election
Party	Candidate	Votes	%	±%
Democratic	John A. Girgenti	18,634	30.2	▼7.4
Democratic	Vincent O. Pellecchia	16,204	26.3	▼8.8
Republican	Walter W. Porter, Jr.	13,538	21.9	▲8.0
Republican	Kenneth Van Rye	13,352	21.6	▲8.2
Total votes		61,728	100.0	

New Jersey general election, 1983
Party	Candidate	Votes	%	±%
Democratic	John A. Girgenti	21,927	37.6	▲2.7
Democratic	Vincent O. Pellecchia	20,497	35.1	▲2.6
Republican	Walter W. Garner III	8,088	13.9	▼3.4
Republican	Norman E. Smith	7,804	13.4	▼1.9
Total votes		58,316	100.0	

New Jersey general election, 1981
Party	Candidate	Votes	%
Democratic	John A. Girgenti	25,361	34.9
Democratic	Vincent O. Pellecchia	23,575	32.5
Republican	Fred Burgos	12,580	17.3
Republican	Russell P. Meneve	11,087	15.3
Total votes		72,603	100.0

New Jersey general election, 1979
Party	Candidate	Votes	%	±%
Democratic	John A. Girgenti	12,763	30.2	▲3.7
Democratic	Vincent O. Pellecchia	11,595	27.4	▼0.6
Republican	Fred Burgos	9,051	21.4	▼3.3
Republican	Frank S. Campana	8,433	19.9	▼0.9
Socialist Labor	Madonna Rabel	446	1.1	N/A
Total votes		42,288	100.0	

New Jersey general election, 1977
Party	Candidate	Votes	%	±%
Democratic	Vincent O. Pellecchia	15,616	28.0	▲3.8
Democratic	John A. Girgenti	14,774	26.5	▲6.7
Republican	Ronald Fava	13,768	24.7	▼3.3
Republican	Henry Ramer	11,624	20.8	▼1.0
Total votes		55,782	100.0	

New Jersey general election, 1975
Party	Candidate	Votes	%	±%
Republican	Ronald Fava	14,676	28.0	▲5.4
Democratic	Vincent O. Pellecchia	12,686	24.2	▼3.7
Republican	Ralph E. Fasse	11,411	21.8	▼0.5
Democratic	William H. Hicks	10,386	19.8	▼7.4
Tax Revolt	Joseph Samuel Long	1,937	3.7	N/A
Tax Revolt	Enrico R. Orlando	1,329	2.5	N/A
Total votes		52,425	100.0	

New Jersey general election, 1973
Party	Candidate	Votes	%
Democratic	Vincent O. Pellecchia	17,548	27.9
Democratic	William H. Hicks	17,144	27.2
Republican	Alfred Fontanella	14,238	22.6
Republican	Marian M. Rauschenbach	14,049	22.3
Total votes		62,979	100.0
