= Frank Davenport =

American politician

Member of the New Jersey Senate from the 35th district
- In office January 8, 1974 – January 10, 1978
- Preceded by: Joseph A. Lazzara (14th district)
- Succeeded by: Frank X. Graves Jr.

Sheriff of Passaic County
- In office 1961–1974

Personal details
- Born: March 19, 1912 Paterson, New Jersey, U.S.
- Died: January 5, 1995 (aged 82)
- Party: Republican

Frank Davenport (March 19, 1912 – January 5, 1995) was an American Republican Party politician who served as the Sheriff of Passaic County, New Jersey and served one term in the New Jersey Senate.

Davenport was born in Paterson in 1912 and attended St. Joseph's High School there. In World War II, he was an Army intelligence special agent. He began his law enforcement career as Undersheriff of Passaic County. In 1960, he became the elected Sheriff of Passaic County, a position his father once held. He was reelected Sheriff in 1963, 1966, 1969, and 1972 though he resigned his Sheriff office upon becoming a State Senator and by 1977 was an Undersheriff again. He had also served as the chair of the Passaic County Republican Party from 1968 to 1974 and attended the 1968 and 1972 Republican National Convention as a district delegate.

In his bid for the State Senate in 1973, he ran in the newly created, Paterson-based 35th district. Despite the heavy Democratic leanings of the urban district, the popularity of the Democrats in the post-Watergate election season, and the incumbency of State Senator Joseph A. Lazzara, Davenport won the election by 93 votes out of 33,745 votes cast. Davenport's margins were much higher in the suburban communities of the district (Hawthorne, North Haledon, and Prospect Park) than the ones Lazzara ran in Paterson. He decided to retire from the Senate after one full term and was succeeded by Frank X. Graves Jr.

He died on January 5, 1995, at the age of 82.
