= Traumatic Brain Injury Reauthorization Act of 2013 =

- Long title: To amend the Public Health Service Act to reauthorize certain programs relating to traumatic brain injury and to trauma research.
- Announced in: the 113th United States Congress
- Sponsored by: Rep. Bill Pascrell Jr. (D, NJ-9)
- Number of co-sponsors: 1

Codification
- Acts affected: Public Health Service Act
- Agencies affected: Health Resources and Services Administration

Legislative history
- Introduced in the House as H.R. 1098 by Rep. Bill Pascrell Jr. (D, NJ-9) on March 12, 2013; Committee consideration by United States House Committee on Energy and Commerce, United States House Energy Subcommittee on Health

The Traumatic Brain Injury Reauthorization Act of 2013 (H.R. 1098) is a bill that would reauthorize appropriations for Centers for Disease Control and Prevention (CDC) projects to reduce the incidence of traumatic brain injury and projects related to track and monitor traumatic brain injuries.

The bill was introduced into the United States House of Representatives during the 113th United States Congress.

== Background ==
Causes of TBI hospital visits and deaths in the US

Traumatic brain injury is defined as damage to the brain resulting from external mechanical force, such as rapid acceleration or deceleration, impact, blast waves, or penetration by a projectile. Brain function is temporarily or permanently impaired and structural damage may or may not be detectable with current technology.

The most common causes of TBI in the U.S. include violence, transportation accidents, construction, and sports. Motor bikes are major causes, increasing in significance in developing countries as other causes reduce. The estimates that between 1.6 and 3.8 million traumatic brain injuries each year are a result of sports and recreation activities in the US. In children aged two to four, falls are the most common cause of TBI, while in older children traffic accidents compete with falls for this position. TBI is the third most common injury to result from child abuse. Abuse causes 19% of cases of pediatric brain trauma, and the death rate is higher among these cases. Domestic violence is another cause of TBI, as are work-related and industrial accidents. Firearms and blast injuries from explosions are other causes of TBI, which is the leading cause of death and disability in war zones. According to Representative Bill Pascrell (Democrat, NJ), TBI is "the signature injury of the wars in Iraq and Afghanistan."

Legislation regarding funding for tracking traumatic brain injuries was first passed in 1996 and then reauthorized in both 2000 and 2008.

== Provisions of the bill ==
This summary is based largely on the summary provided by the Congressional Research Service, a public domain source.

The Traumatic Brain Injury Reauthorization Act of 2013 would amend the Public Health Service Act to reauthorize appropriations for FY2014-FY2018 for: (1) Centers for Disease Control and Prevention (CDC) projects to reduce the incidence of traumatic brain injury, and (2) traumatic brain injury surveillance systems or registries.

The bill would reauthorize through FY2018 programs of grants to: (1) states and American Indian consortia for projects to improve access to rehabilitation and other services regarding traumatic brain injury, and (2) protection and advocacy systems for the purpose of enabling such systems to provide services to individuals with traumatic brain injury. The bill would remove the Administrator of the Health Resources and Services Administration as agent for the United States Secretary of Health and Human Services (HHS) in administering these programs. The bill would vest responsibility for administering the programs solely in the Secretary.

The bill would reauthorize through FY2018 the comprehensive program of research on trauma carried out by the Secretary, acting through the Director of the National Institutes of Health (NIH).

== Congressional Budget Office report ==
This summary is based largely on the summary provided by the Congressional Budget Office, as ordered reported by the House Committee on Energy and Commerce on December 11, 2013. This is a public domain source.

H.R. 1098 would amend provisions of the Public Health Service Act that authorize the United States Department of Health and Human Services to conduct activities related to traumatic brain injury. Those activities, including the study and surveillance of traumatic brain injury and the awarding of grants that support access to services, are carried out by the Centers for Disease Control and Prevention (CDC) and the Health Resources and Services Administration (HRSA).

The bill would authorize the appropriation of about $16 million annually for fiscal years 2014 through 2018 for activities related to traumatic brain injury. The Congressional Budget Office (CBO) estimates that implementing the bill would cost about $74 million over the 2014-2019 period, assuming appropriation of the authorized amounts. Pay-as-you-go procedures do not apply to this legislation because it would not affect direct spending or revenues.

The bill contains no intergovernmental or private-sector mandates as defined in the Unfunded Mandates Reform Act.

== Procedural history ==
The Traumatic Brain Injury Reauthorization Act of 2013 was introduced into the United States House of Representatives on March 12, 2013 by Rep. Bill Pascrell Jr. (D, NJ-9). The bill was referred to the United States House Committee on Energy and Commerce and the United States House Energy Subcommittee on Health. The committee agreed in a voice vote to approve the bill. The bill was reported (amended) by the committee on May 20, 2014 alongside House Report 113-456.

== Debate and discussion ==
The National Association of State Head Injury Administrators (NASHIA) supported the bill, calling the programs supported by the bill "critical in helping states to address" the unique needs of individuals with traumatic brain injuries. NASHIA supported the bill for allowing states their own flexibility to address needs in their own states and applauded the CDC's work in public education, trying to prevent bad falls by the elderly, and trying to stop sports related traumatic brain injuries.

== See also ==
- List of bills in the 113th United States Congress
