= William H. Hicks =

American politician

Member of the New Jersey General Assembly
- In office January 11, 1972 – January 13, 1976
- Preceded by: Joseph Hirkala; Joseph F. Scancarella
- Succeeded by: Ronald Fava
- Constituency: District 14B (1972–1974); 35th District (1974–1976)

Personal details
- Born: August 27, 1925 Littleton, North Carolina
- Died: September 3, 1987 (aged 62)
- Party: Democratic
- Education: William Paterson College (BA)

Military service
- Branch/service: United States Navy

William Henry Hicks (August 27, 1925 – September 3, 1987) was an American Democratic Party politician. He served in the New Jersey General Assembly encompassing Paterson, New Jersey from 1972 through 1976. He had also served on the Paterson City Commission, becoming the first African-American president of that body.

== Early life and education ==
He was born in Littleton, North Carolina and resided in Paterson since 1935. He attended Paterson Public Schools and earned a B.A. in education from William Paterson College.

== Career ==
Hicks served in the United States Naval Air Corps and worked as a car salesman. In 1966, Hicks was elected as an alderman on the Paterson City Commission from the city's fourth ward and served three terms through 1971. He was chosen to serve as president of the commission and was the first African American to be the leader of the board.

In 1971, Hicks was elected to the General Assembly from District 14B encompassing Paterson and West Paterson. In 1973, he was reelected to the Assembly in the new 35th Legislative District (encompassing Paterson, North Haledon and Hawthorne) alongside Democrat Vincent O. Pellecchia. However, in 1975, he lost reelection coming in fourth place behind Republican Ronald Fava, incumbent Pellecchia, and Republican Ralph E. Faasse.

== Personal life ==
He had been married to Bernice Louise Manners and was later married to Margaret Adlia Long. He had four children. Hicks died on September 3, 1987.
