= Donald Hayden =

American politician

Member of the New Jersey General Assembly from the 35th district
- In office October 1994 – January 9, 1996 Serving with Bill Pascrell
- Preceded by: Frank Catania
- Succeeded by: Alfred E. Steele

Personal details
- Born: April 24, 1937 Paterson, New Jersey
- Died: September 19, 2014 (aged 77) Glen Ridge, New Jersey
- Party: Republican
- Spouse: Joanna De Marco
- Education: William Paterson University; New Jersey City University

Donald Hayden (April 24, 1937 – September 19, 2014) was an American Republican Party politician who served in the New Jersey General Assembly from the 35th Legislative District from 1994 to 1996.

== Biography ==
Born and raised in Paterson, New Jersey, Hayden served in the U.S. Army and was a student at William Paterson College (since renamed as William Paterson University) and Jersey City State College (since renamed as New Jersey City University).

He was an officer in the Paterson Police Department and worked in the Passaic County Prosecutor's Office and at Passaic County Community College. He served on the Paterson city council from 1992 to 2000.

Hayden was appointed to the assembly after Frank Catania resigned on September 23, 1994, to become director of the New Jersey Division of Gaming Enforcement. In the November 1995 general election, Hayden and his running mate Dennis Gonzalez were defeated by Democratic incumbent Bill Pascrell and his running mate Alfred E. Steele.

A resident of Rutherford, New Jersey, and the Totowa, New Jersey, Hayden died in Glen Ridge, New Jersey, on September 19, 2014.
