= Frank Catania =

American politician (born 1941)

Member of the New Jersey General Assembly from the 35th district
- In office November 1990 – September 23, 1994 Serving with Bill Pascrell
- Preceded by: Cyril Yannarelli
- Succeeded by: Donald Hayden

Personal details
- Born: November 17, 1941 (age 83); Paterson, New Jersey
- Political party: Republican
- Education: Rutgers University; Seton Hall University School of Law

Frank Catania (born November 17, 1941) is an American lawyer and Republican Party politician who served in the New Jersey General Assembly from the 35th Legislative District from 1990 to 1994.

A resident of Hawthorne, New Jersey, Catania was born in Paterson, New Jersey, earned his undergraduate degree at Rutgers University and a juris doctor at Seton Hall University School of Law.
