= Mike Miello =

American football player and coach

Biographical details
- Education: University of Rhode Island (1967); Seton Hall University (1977)

Playing career
- 1965–1966: Rhode Island
- Position: Tight end

Coaching career (HC unless noted)
- 1967–1968: Rhode Island (GA)
- 1969: Columbia (RB)
- 1970–1975: Hackensack HS (NJ)
- 1978–1993: Ramapo HS NJ
- 1995–2000: Ramapo HS NJ
- 2001-2004: Rutgers (assistant)
- 2005–2007: William Paterson
- 2008–2011: Hackensack HS (NJ)

Head coaching record
- Overall: 11–19 (college)

Mike Miello is an American former football coach. He served as head football coach at William Paterson University in Wayne Township, New Jersey from 2005 to 2007, compiling a record of 11–19. After leaving William Paterson, he returned to Hackensack High School before retiring from coaching in 2011.

== Head coaching record ==
=== College ===
Year	Team	Overall	Conference	Standing	Bowl/playoffs
William Paterson Pioneers (New Jersey Athletic Conference) (2005–2007)
2005	William Paterson	5–5	1–5	T–6th	
2006	William Paterson	1–9	1–6	8th	
2007	William Paterson	5–5	3–4	T–4th	
William Paterson:		11–19			
Total:		11–19			
