= Frank X. Graves Jr. =

American politician

New Jersey State Senator for the 35th Legislative District
- In office 1978–1990
- Preceded by: Frank Davenport
- Succeeded by: John Girgenti

Mayor of Paterson
- In office 1961–1966
- Preceded by: William H. Dillistin
- Succeeded by: Pat Kramer
- In office 1982–1990
- Preceded by: Pat Kramer
- Succeeded by: Anna Dopirak

Personal details
- Born: Francis Xavier Graves Jr. November 4, 1923 Paterson, New Jersey, U.S.
- Died: March 4, 1990 (aged 66) Paterson, New Jersey, U.S.
- Party: Democratic
- Spouse: Ethel Kirsop
- Profession: Politician

Frank Xavier Graves Jr. (November 4, 1923 – March 4, 1990) was an American Democratic Party politician who is best known for serving two separate terms as Mayor of Paterson, New Jersey. He also served on the Paterson City Council, the Passaic County Board of Chosen Freeholders and in the New Jersey Senate in his long career.

== Early days ==
Graves was born in Paterson and lived there for most of his life. His father, Frank Sr., worked as a reporter for the Paterson Evening News and also ran a successful vending machine company. Following his graduation from Eastside High School he enrolled at the University of Virginia, but left shortly thereafter to enlist in World War II, serving with the 50th Armored Division. He was injured while serving in Europe and met his wife, Ethel, convalescing from shrapnel wounds. They were married when they returned to the United States.

== Early political career ==
When Frank and Ethel Graves returned from the war, he enrolled in Paterson State College and ran for the Paterson, New Jersey Board of Aldermen when he graduated. In 1955, Graves was elected to a seat on the Passaic County Board of Chosen Freeholder and served for five years.

In 1961, Graves won his first term as Mayor of Paterson, New Jersey. He was elected to two three-year terms, which was Paterson's limit at the time, and left office in 1966. He also served as a delegate to the 1964 Democratic National Convention that nominated Lyndon Johnson and Hubert H. Humphrey for president and vice president.

== Return to office ==
After several years, Graves returned to elective office and was elected to the City Council. He served as its president from 1974 to 1978. During this time Graves decided to run for state office and in November 1977, he won election to the State Senate from the relatively new 35th Legislative District. He stood for reelection three times in the next ten years, as per state rules, and won all three times, the final time in 1987.

Four months after taking office for his second term as a state Senator, Graves decided to run for mayor of Paterson again. He won elected to a four-year term in May 1982 and was reelected in May 1986; Paterson changed its election laws in the years following Graves' first stint as mayor to lengthen the terms of sitting mayors from three years to four.

== Methods ==
During his time in office Graves was known as a law-and-order and hands-on mayor who was never afraid to take action when something needed to be done in Paterson or in the state legislature. He often accompanied the police on its rounds, leading raids, and would always carry a series of two-way radios and telephones with him as he went about his day. Graves was noted for driving through every Paterson neighborhood seven days a week inspecting the areas and calling the proper authorities when he saw something that he determined to be wrong (litter, graffiti, etc.). He also often pursued people for owing taxes to the city, going as far as to call the property owners himself and threatening to arrest those who did not pay. In 1966 he ordered the arrest of poet Allen Ginsberg, a Paterson native, after he said at a reading that he had smoked marijuana at Paterson's Great Falls.

While serving in the State Senate, Graves pushed for stiff penalties for criminal offenses, and in 1981 wrote a law concerning gun-related offenses. The Graves Act, as it was called, mandated a minimum three-year sentence for anyone who used a firearm in commission of a crime. (A recent expansion of the law, which was also made a part of 2008 anti-gang legislation, specifies that a three- to five-year sentence is prescribed for these offenses).

== Death ==
As 1990 began Graves was making plans to run for a third consecutive term as mayor of Paterson, as the same law changes that lengthened a mayor's term of office also removed the limits on how many consecutive terms a mayor could serve. It would not come to pass, however. On the morning of March 4, 1990, at his home in Paterson's Lakeview section, Graves was stricken with a massive heart attack. He was rushed to nearby St. Joseph's Hospital, but doctors could not revive him and he was pronounced dead shortly thereafter. He was buried in Holy Sepulchre Cemetery in Totowa, New Jersey.

Graves' Senate seat was filled by State Assemblyman John Girgenti, who was appointed to the seat and confirmed in April 1990. The vacant mayoral seat was contested between Girgenti's Assembly colleague Bill Pascrell, City Council President Rev. Albert Rowe, Freeholder Michael Adamo, and Councilman At-Large Roy Griffin. Pascrell, who served as a United States representative from New Jersey's 9th Congressional District until his own death in 2024, won the seat and served as mayor until he resigned from both of his elected positions to take his seat in Congress.

== Popular culture ==
Graves was fictionalized as Don Bottman and portrayed by Alan North in the 1989 film Lean on Me.
