= Nellie Pou =

American politician (born 1956)

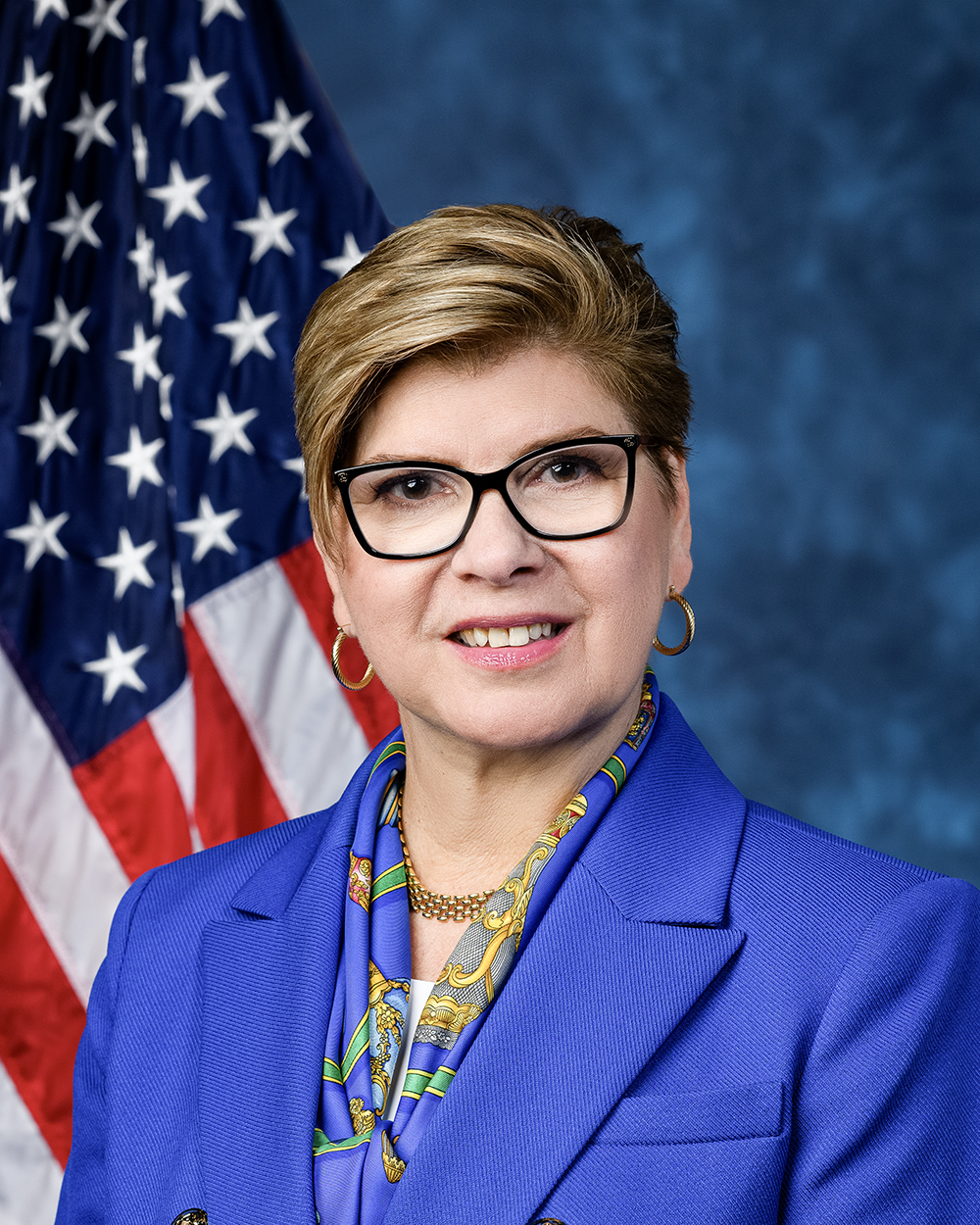
- Official portrait, 2024

Member of the U.S. House of Representatives from New Jersey's 9th district
- Incumbent
- Assumed office January 3, 2025
- Preceded by: Bill Pascrell

Member of the New Jersey Senate from the 35th district
- In office January 10, 2012 – January 1, 2025
- Preceded by: John Girgenti
- Succeeded by: Benjie Wimberly

Member of the New Jersey General Assembly from the 35th district
- In office January 29, 1997 – January 10, 2012
- Preceded by: Bill Pascrell
- Succeeded by: Shavonda Sumter; Benjie Wimberly

Personal details
- Born: May 20, 1956 (age 70) Paterson, New Jersey, U.S.
- Party: Democratic
- Spouse: Richard Freid
- Children: 2
- Education: Kean University (attended); Rutgers University, New Brunswick (attended); University of Virginia (attended)
- Website: House website Campaign website

Nelida Avila Pou (/poʊ/ POH; born May 20, 1956) is an American politician and business administrator serving as the U.S. representative for New Jersey's 9th congressional district since 2025. A member of the Democratic Party, she previously served in the New Jersey Senate from 2012 to 2025 and the New Jersey General Assembly from 1997 to 2012, representing the 35th legislative district. When Pou was sworn into the Assembly on January 29, 1997, to succeed Bill Pascrell, she became the first woman and the first Hispanic to represent the 35th district.

Pou served in the Senate as the Majority Caucus Chair. Pou also chaired the bicameral New Jersey Legislative Latino Caucus since 2006. From 2022 to 2023, Pou was also president of the National Hispanic Caucus of State Legislators.

On August 29, 2024, Pou was selected to replace Rep. Bill Pascrell on the ballot as the Democratic candidate in New Jersey's 9th congressional district following his death eight days earlier.

== Early life and education ==
Pou was born on May 20, 1956. She attended Kean College, Rutgers University, and the University of Virginia.

== Career ==
Pou had spent much of her career working for the City of Paterson, where she had served as business administrator (2014–2018), assistant business administrator (2003–2014, 1997–1998), director of human services (1986–1997), and CETA training and education coordinator (1975–1983).

In 2019, she was a project coordinator for the Paterson Parking Authority.

She had also served on the New Jersey Task Force on Child Abuse and Neglect (1997–2016) and on the Passaic-Bergen County HIV Health Services Advisory Council (1993–1997). She was the coordinator of the Passaic County Youth Program from 1983 to 1985.

=== New Jersey General Assembly ===
Pou was appointed to a vacant seat previously held since 1988 by Bill Pascrell in the New Jersey General Assembly on January 29, 1997. Pascrell resigned from his position after being elected to the U.S. House of Representatives, and sworn in on January 3, 1997. She was the Assembly's Deputy Speaker from 2002 to 2005 and the Assistant Minority Leader from 2000 to 2001.

In the Assembly, Pou served on the Appropriations Committee (as Chair from 2006 to 2011), the Budget Committee, the Education Committee, and the Joint Budget Oversight Committee. Previously, Pou served on the Senior Issues Committee (as chair), the Appropriations Committee (as vice chair), and the Education Committee.

=== New Jersey Senate ===
Instead of running for re-election to her Assembly seat in 2011, Pou ran for the State Senate seat from the district that long-time incumbent John Girgenti was vacating. She easily defeated former Haledon Mayor Ken Pengitore in the 2011 New Jersey Senate election, as expected, and was sworn in as Senator in January 2012. She was re-elected to the New Jersey Senate in 2013, 2017, 2021, and 2023.

=== Committees ===
Committee assignments for the 2024–2025 legislative session were:

- Commerce (as chair)
- Judiciary (as vice-chair)

== U.S. House of Representatives ==
=== Elections ===
==== 2024 ====
On August 21, 2024, incumbent Congressman Bill Pascrell died. On August 29, Passaic County Democratic committee members nominated Pou to run to represent New Jersey's 9th congressional district, facing Republican Billy Prempeh in the 2024 election. Democratic leaders rapidly agreed to choose her to replace Pascrell; the deadline for replacing Pascrell on the ballot was midnight that evening.

In the 2024 election, the district shifted dramatically to the right, narrowly voting for Republican presidential candidate Donald Trump after having previously voted for Democrat Joe Biden over Trump by 20 points in 2020. Pou won by almost 5 points over Republican Billy Prempeh, a much narrower margin than previous congressional races.

==== 2026 ====
Pou is running for re-election in 2026. In August 2025, The New Jersey Monitor reported that Pou "is facing increasing attacks from progressives and Republicans as she gears up for her first reelection fight next year." Republicans have criticized Pou for her votes against Republican spending bills and for her opposition to their immigration policies while progressives have criticized her for taking a trip to Israel that was paid for by a pro-Israel lobbying group.

Primary elections were held on June 2, 2026, in which Pou won the Democratic nomination uncontested.

=== Committee assignments ===
For the 119th Congress:

- Committee on Homeland Security
  - Subcommittee on Counterterrorism and Intelligence
- Committee on Transportation and Infrastructure
  - Subcommittee on Aviation (Vice Ranking Member)
  - Subcommittee on Highways and Transit
  - Subcommittee on Water Resources and Environment

=== Caucus memberships ===
- Congressional Equality Caucus
- Congressional Hispanic Caucus
- New Democrat Coalition
- Congressional Progressive Caucus

== Personal life ==
Pou is married to Judge Richard Freid, and they live in North Haledon. She has two children from a previous marriage and is Roman Catholic.

== Election history ==
2024 New Jersey's 9th congressional district election
Party	Candidate	Votes	%
Democratic	Nellie Pou	130,514	50.8
Republican	Billy Prempeh	117,939	45.9
Green	Benjamin Taylor	5,027	1.9
Libertarian	Bruno Pereira	3,533	1.4
Total votes		257,013	100.0
Democratic hold			

New Jersey's 9th congressional district's Democratic special appointment convention
Party	Candidate	Votes	%
Democratic	Nellie Pou	Unopposed	
Total votes		≤806	100%

35th Legislative District General Election, 2023
Party	Candidate	Votes	%
Democratic	Nelida Pou (incumbent)	11,950	69.0
Republican	Christopher Faustino	5,365	31.0
Total votes		17,315	100.0
Democratic hold			

35th Legislative District general election, 2021
Party	Candidate	Votes	%
Democratic	Nelida Pou (incumbent)	20,464	68.59
Republican	Kenneth Pengitore	9,372	31.41
Total votes		29,836	100.0
Democratic hold			

New Jersey State Senate elections, 2017
Party	Candidate	Votes	%
Democratic	Nellie Pou (incumbent)	21,425	79.0
Republican	Marwan Sholakh	5,698	21.0
Democratic hold			

New Jersey State Senate elections, 2013
Party	Candidate	Votes	%
Democratic	Nellie Pou (incumbent)	22,154	74.1
Republican	Lynda Gallashaw	7,737	25.9
Democratic hold			

New Jersey State Senate elections, 2011
Party	Candidate	Votes	%
Democratic	Nellie Pou	14,386	74.7
Republican	Ken Pengitore	4,867	25.3
Democratic hold			

== See also ==
- List of Hispanic and Latino Americans in the United States Congress

U.S. House of Representatives
Preceded by Bill Pascrell	Member of the U.S. House of Representatives from New Jersey's 9th congressional district 2025–present	Incumbent
U.S. order of precedence (ceremonial)
Preceded by Bob Onder	United States representatives by seniority 411th	Succeeded by Emily Randall
