= Bill Pascrell =

American politician (1937–2024)

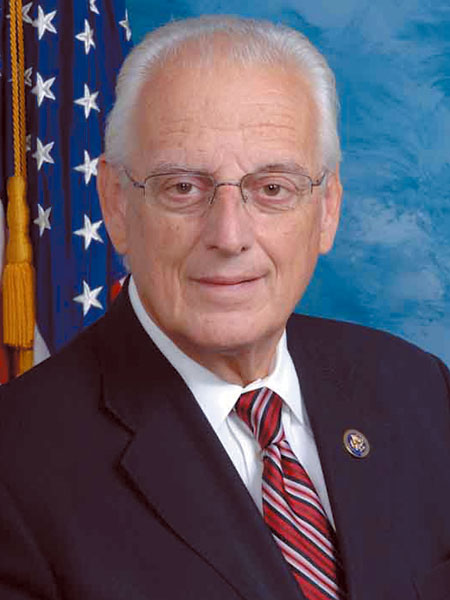

Member of the U.S. House of Representatives from New Jersey
- In office January 3, 1997 – August 21, 2024
- Preceded by: Bill Martini
- Succeeded by: Nellie Pou
- Constituency: 8th district (1997–2013); 9th district (2013–2024)

Mayor of Paterson
- In office July 1, 1990 – January 3, 1997
- Preceded by: Anna Dopirak
- Succeeded by: Martin Barnes

Member of the New Jersey General Assembly from the 35th district
- In office January 12, 1988 – January 3, 1997 Serving with John Girgenti, Cyril Yannarelli, Frank Catania, Donald Hayden, Alfred E. Steele
- Preceded by: Vincent O. Pellecchia
- Succeeded by: Nellie Pou

Personal details
- Born: William James Pascrell Jr. January 25, 1937 Paterson, New Jersey, U.S.
- Died: August 21, 2024 (aged 87) Livingston, New Jersey, U.S.
- Resting place: Holy Sepulchre Cemetery, Totowa, New Jersey, U.S.
- Party: Democratic
- Spouse: Elsie Botto (m. 1962)
- Children: 3
- Education: Fordham University (BA, MA)

Military service
- Branch/service: United States Army
- Years of service: 1958–1967
- Rank: Sergeant
- Pascrell's voice Pascrell supporting a House resolution on traumatic brain injury Recorded May 3, 2006

William James Pascrell Jr. (January 25, 1937 – August 21, 2024) was an American politician who was a U.S. representative from New Jersey from 1997 until his death in 2024. Pascrell was a member of the Democratic Party and native of Paterson. Before his election to the House of Representatives, Pascrell served in the New Jersey General Assembly for four terms beginning in 1988 and was elected to two terms as mayor of Paterson.

He was initially elected to the House in 1996 representing New Jersey's 8th congressional district. In 2012, the 8th district was redistricted into the 9th district. Pascrell defeated fellow Democratic representative Steve Rothman in a primary and was elected to represent the 9th district during the 2012 general election. He served as the representative from the 9th district until his death.

== Early life, education, and academic career ==
The grandson of Italian immigrants, William James Pascrell Jr. was born in Paterson, New Jersey, on January 25, 1937, the son of Roffie J. (née Loffredo) and William James Pascrell (originally Pascrelli). He attended St. George's Elementary School, and in 1955 graduated from St. John the Baptist High School, where he was elected student council president. He served in the United States Army and United States Army reserves. Pascrell attended Fordham University in New York City and earned a bachelor's degree in journalism and a master's degree in philosophy.

Pascrell spent 12 years as a high school teacher in Paramus, New Jersey, teaching several subjects including psychology, before being hired as a professor at Fairleigh Dickinson University. He was appointed to the Paterson Board of Education and served as board president. He also served on Passaic County Community College's board of trustees.

== Early political career ==
=== State Assembly ===
Pascrell was first elected to office in 1987 when he ran for the New Jersey General Assembly seat, which was vacated by the retiring Vincent O. Pellecchia. He and incumbent Assemblyman John Girgenti retained the District 35 seats for the Democrats by defeating Republican nominees Martin Barnes, a Paterson city councilman, and Robert Angele, who worked in the city housing administration. Pascrell received 34% of the vote, enough to earn him the seat.

Pascrell and Girgenti were reelected in 1989 over Republicans Joaquin Calcines, Jr. and Jose Moore, with Pascrell polling at 36%; however, Girgenti was replaced by Cyril Yannarelli midway through the term when he was appointed to the State Senate following the March 5, 1990 death of Frank Graves.

Entering the 1991 election, District 35 was split as Pascrell and Frank Catania, a Republican, were standing for reelection (Catania having won a special election for Girgenti's Assembly seat). Pascrell and Catania won re-election, with Pascrell's running mate Eli Burgos finishing third and his Paterson rival Martin Barnes fourth.

In 1993, Pascrell and Reverend Alfred E. Steele of Paterson attempted to put Democrats in full control of District 35 again while Catania ran with Paterson's Harvey Nutter to try to win the seats for the Republicans. Once again, the incumbents won, with Pascrell as the leading vote-getter at 31%. Catania had a tighter race with Steele.

Pascrell and Steele broke through as a pair and won control of the Assembly seats for the Democrats in 1995. Facing Donald Hayden, who was appointed to the seat after Catania was selected to serve in a state administrative position, and Dennis Gonzalez in the general election, both emerged with significant victories and Pascrell once again topped out at 33%. He eventually became Minority Leader Pro Tempore.

Pascrell resigned from the General Assembly in January 1997 in order to take his seat in the House of Representatives and was replaced by Paterson municipal administrator Nellie Pou; she would also succeed him in the House in 2025.

=== Mayor of Paterson ===
In May of 1990, Pascrell ran for the mayoral seat in his hometown, which had also been vacated after Graves' death in March. He faced City Council President Reverend Albert P. Rowe, Passaic County Freeholder Michael Adamo, and former councilman and police officer Roy Griffin in the nonpartisan election, which he won with 51.4% of the vote. He was sworn in on July 1, 1990, and served his term concurrently with his role as State Assemblyman.

Pascrell ran for a second term in 1994 and faced two challengers, his former District 35 rival Martin Barnes and long-standing Sixth Ward councilman and former mayor Tom Rooney. He won the three-way contest with 46% of the vote.

Pascrell resigned as mayor on January 3, 1997, in order to take his congressional seat. The city council appointed Barnes to replace him.

== U.S. House of Representatives ==
=== Elections ===
In 1996, Pascrell ran for the Democratic nomination in New Jersey's Eighth Congressional District. The seat had been reliably Democratic for many years; it had been in Democratic hands without interruption from 1961 to 1995, with Robert A. Roe serving from 1969 until 1993. But in the 1994 Republican Revolution, Republican Bill Martini, a Clifton councilman and Passaic County freeholder, defeated Roe's successor, Herbert Klein. Pascrell won the nomination and the seat, defeating the incumbent with 51% of the vote. The district reverted to form, and Pascrell never faced another contest nearly that close again; winning reelection seven more times with at least 62% of the vote.

==== 2012 ====
After redistricting, the existing 8th district was eliminated, and Pascrell's home in Paterson was placed in the newly redrawn 9th district. Fellow Democratic congressman Steve Rothman decided to move into the reconfigured 9th and challenge Pascrell in the primary. Rothman's home in Fair Lawn had been drawn into a Republican-leaning district against Republican Scott Garrett. Geographically, the new district was more Rothman's district than Pascrell's. It covered 53% of Rothman's former territory and only 43% of Pascrell's.

The primary contest devolved into a highly competitive proxy war over Israel. American Arab Forum president Aref Assaf published a column in The Star-Ledger, "Rothman Is Israel's Man in District 9", in which he wrote:

As total and blind support becomes the only reason for choosing Rothman, voters who do not view the elections in this prism will need to take notice. Loyalty to a foreign flag is not loyalty to America's [flag].

Pascrell supporters reportedly produced Arabic-language campaign posters encouraging the "Arab diaspora community" to elect Pascrell, "the friend of the Arabs." The posters called the race "the most important election in the history of the [Arab American] community."

Jewish Voice and Opinion publisher Susan Rosenbluth wrote that "a number of Arab-American constituents have come out with outrageous attacks on Rothman" and "I haven't heard a dual loyalty charge for years." She also sharply criticized Pascrell for remaining silent and refusing to condemn the charges of dual loyalty.

Pascrell defeated Rothman in the June 5 Democratic primary, 31,435 to 19,947, capturing about 61% of the vote.

In the general election, Pascrell faced Rabbi Shmuley Boteach. Pascrell raised more money than any other congressional candidate in the nation in 2012 ($2.6 million) and raised 10 times the sum that Boteach raised. Democrats outnumbered Republicans by a three-to-one margin in the new 9th district. Pascrell won a ninth term by a margin of 73.6% to 25.4%.

=== Tenure ===
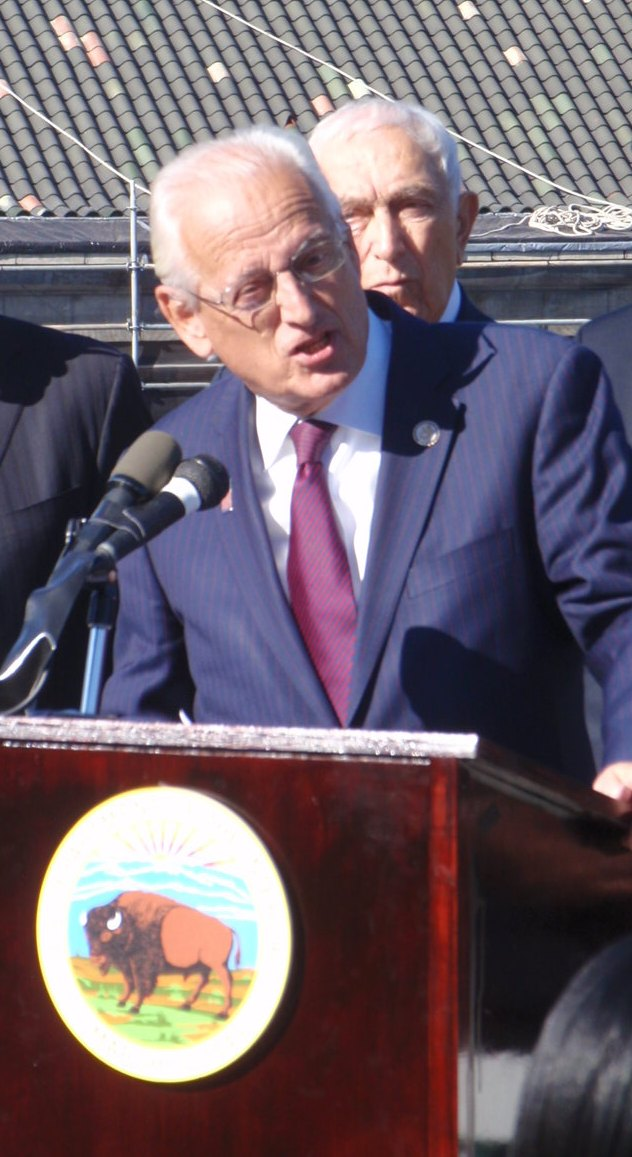
Pascrell in 2011

On October 10, 2002, Pascrell was among 81 Democratic House members to vote to authorize the invasion of Iraq.

Pascrell was one of the original members of the Homeland Security Committee, eventually rising to the post of ranking member on the Emergency Preparedness Subcommittee. He has a particular interest in fire safety, and authored the bill that created the Assistance to Firefighters Grant Program, which gives federal grants directly to all fire departments, including volunteer fire departments, which he called "the forgotten part of the public safety equation".

Pascrell was also a member of the House Transportation Committee, where he worked to modernize roads, bridges, airports, and mass transit systems. He secured funding for reconstructing various dangerous New Jersey roads and bridges, including the Route 46 corridor. In addition, he helped craft legislation to renew federal surface transportation programs, providing funding for New Jersey Transit. The legislation concerned projects of rail expansion between Passaic and Bergen counties, bridge construction throughout Route 46, and the establishment of~ a bike-pedestrian path in South Orange.

Pascrell was an Italian American and was outspoken about Italian Americans' stereotypical representation in shows such as HBO's The Sopranos. His Italian heritage was questioned by comedian Stephen Colbert of The Colbert Report, who alleged in an interview that Pascrell could not truly be of Italian descent because Italian surnames must end with a vowel. Pressed by Colbert for an example of an Italian surname ending in a consonant, Pascrell responded with "Sole".

During Bruce Springsteen and the E Street Band's 2009 Working on a Dream Tour, Pascrell asked the Federal Trade Commission and the U.S. Department of Justice to investigate the practices of Ticketmaster and TicketsNow in regard to sales of tickets to the tour's New Jersey shows. He subsequently introduced federal legislation, the "BOSS ACT" (Better Oversight of Secondary Sales and Accountability in Concert Ticketing), to require primary ticket sellers to disclose how many tickets were being held back from sale, prohibit ticket brokers from buying tickets during the first 48 hours on sale, and prohibit primary ticket sellers, promoters, and artists from entering the secondary market. In 2012, problems again arose during the ticket sales for Springsteen's 2012 Wrecking Ball Tour. Ticketmaster said web traffic was 2.5 times its highest level for the year. Shows were selling out within minutes and many tickets at much higher prices appeared on resale websites such as StubHub less than an hour after the onsale time. Pascrell said he would reintroduce the BOSS ACT.

In October 2008, after the death of a young boy in his district who returned to playing football without having fully recovered from a concussion sustained earlier in the season, Pascrell introduced the Concussion Treatment and Care Tools Act (ConTACT), which has been endorsed by the National Football League, the National Football League Players Association, and the Brain Injury Association of America. ConTACT brings together a conference of experts to produce a guidelines for the treatment and care of concussions for middle- and high-school students. It also provides funding for schools' adoption of baseline and post-injury neuropsychological testing technologies.

In 2009, Pascrell was instrumental in the protection of Paterson Great Falls National Historical Park.

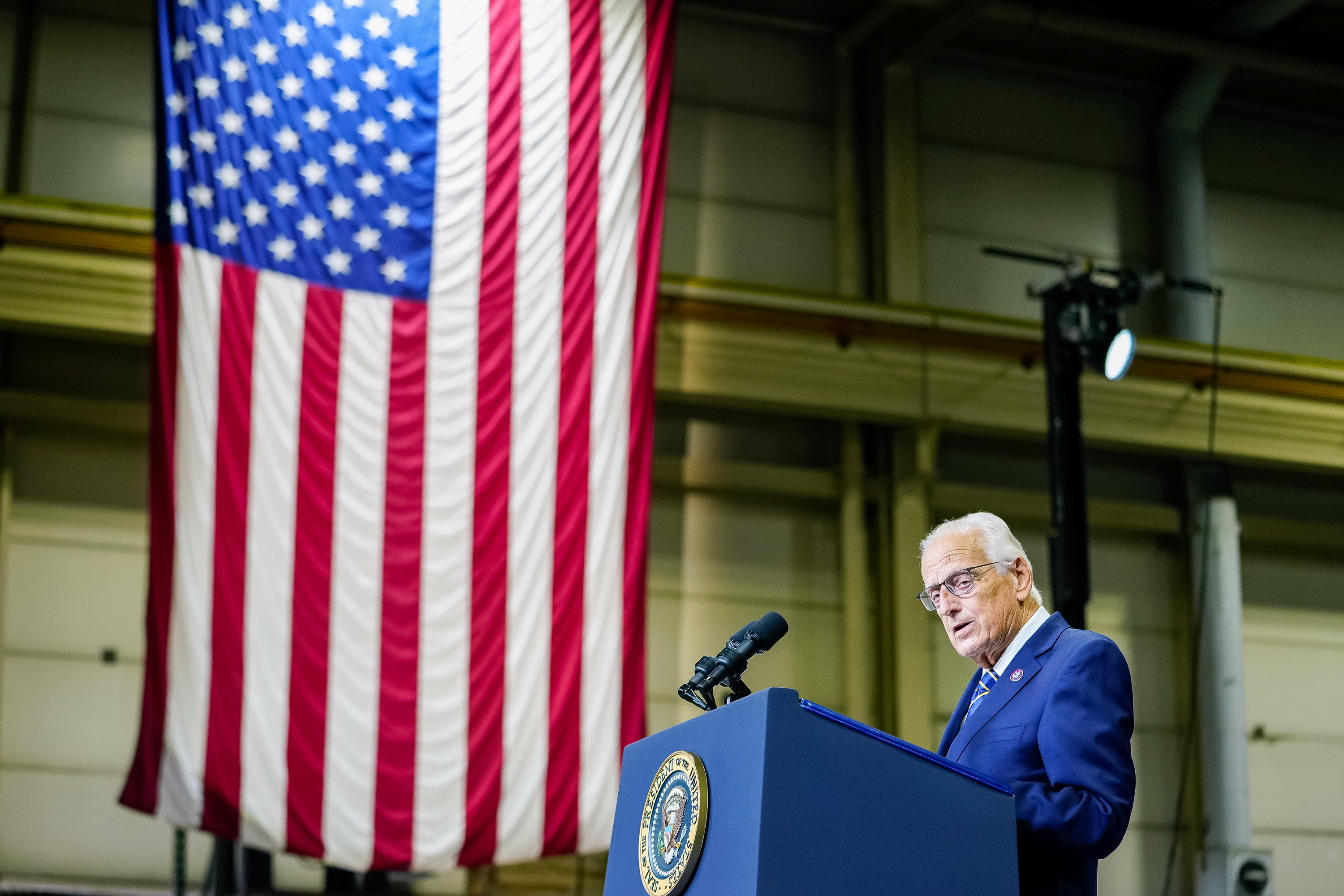
Pascrell delivers remarks on the Build Back Better Agenda in October 2021 in Kearny, New Jersey.

In January 2011, in response to the shooting of Representative Gabby Giffords, Pascrell said, "[t]here's an aura of hate and elected politicians feed it. Certain people on Fox News feed it."

On March 12, 2013, Pascrell introduced the Traumatic Brain Injury Reauthorization Act of 2013 (H.R. 1098; 113th Congress), a bill that would reauthorize appropriations for Centers for Disease Control and Prevention (CDC) projects to reduce the incidence of traumatic brain injury and projects related to track and monitor traumatic brain injuries. He was the co-founder and co-chair of the Congressional Brain Injury Task Force, which was founded in 2001 and grew to include more than 100 members of Congress.

On December 11, 2020, Pascrell, citing the 14th Amendment (§3, specifically), called for House Speaker Nancy Pelosi not to seat Republicans who signed an amicus curiae brief supporting Texas v. Pennsylvania plaintiff Ken Paxton, Texas Attorney General. This proposal would not seat nearly two-thirds of the Republican representatives of the incoming 117th United States Congress. Pascrell said, "The text of the 14th Amendment expressly forbids Members of Congress from engaging in rebellion against the United States. Trying to overturn a democratic election and install a dictator seems like a pretty clear example of that."

Pascrell had a mixed record on abortion while in Congress. In 1997, Pascrell was one of 77 House Democrats to vote in favor the Partial-Birth Abortion Ban Act. He voted for the legislation again in 2003, when it was signed into law by President George W. Bush. Subsequently, he adopted a stance more supportive of abortion rights. In 2013, Pascrell voted against the Pain-Capable Unborn Child Protection Act despite noting that he had "been against any government funding of abortion" throughout his congressional tenure. After the Supreme Court overturned Roe v. Wade in 2022, he wrote that "it is not the place for a judge or politician to interfere with a woman's bodily decision." In December 2022, he voted in favor of the Puerto Rico Status Act (H.R. 8393), bipartisan legislation that gives the people of Puerto Rico the ability to decide their political future. He voted against the Born-Alive Abortion Survivors Protection Act in January 2023.

Pascrell voted with President Joe Biden's stated position 100% of the time in the 117th Congress, according to a FiveThirtyEight analysis.

The New York Times described Pascrell as a "blunt progressive Democrat".

=== Committee assignments ===
- Committee on Ways and Means
  - Chairman, Subcommittee on Oversight

=== Caucus memberships ===
- Law Enforcement Caucus (co-chair)
- Congressional Fire Services Caucus (co-chair)
- Congressional Historic Preservation Caucus (co-chair)
- Congressional Home Protection Caucus (co-chair)
- House Textile Caucus (co-chair)
- House Baltic Caucus
- Congressional Arts Caucus
- U.S.-Japan Caucus
- Blue Collar Caucus
- Rare Disease Caucus
- Congressional Coalition on Adoption
- Congressional Caucus on Turkey and Turkish Americans
- Congressional Wildlife Refuge Caucus

=== Party leadership ===
- Steering and Policy Committee, Region IX representative (New Jersey, Delaware, Maryland, Virginia, and Washington D.C.)

== Personal life ==
Pascrell was married to his wife, Elsie, for 61 years. The couple had three children. At the time of Pascrell's death, the couple had five grandchildren.

Pascrell was a Roman Catholic.

=== Illness and death ===
In 2020, Pascrell underwent heart surgery.

On July 14, 2024, Pascrell was admitted to St. Joseph's Regional Medical Center in Paterson, where he was treated for a respiratory illness and spent some time in intensive care. He was discharged to a rehabilitation facility on August 7, but on August 11, he was hospitalized again, at Cooperman Barnabas Medical Center in Livingston, New Jersey. Pascrell died on August 21, 2024, at the age of 87. He was the second New Jersey congressman to die in office in 2024 after Donald Payne Jr., who died on April 24. Pascrell's funeral Mass was held on August 28, 2024, at the Cathedral of St. John the Baptist in Paterson, and he was buried at the Holy Sepulchre Cemetery in Totowa, New Jersey.

== Electoral history ==
New Jersey's 8th congressional district and New Jersey's 9th congressional district: Results 1996–2022
Year	Democratic	Votes	Pct	Republican	Votes	Pct	3rd Party	Party	Votes	Pct	
1996	Bill Pascrell Jr.	98,861	51%	William J. Martini	92,609	48%	Jeffrey M. Levine	Independent	1,621	1%	
1998	Bill Pascrell Jr.	81,068	62%	Matthew J. Kirnan	46,289	35%	Jeffrey M. Levine	Independent	804	1%	*
2000	Bill Pascrell Jr.	134,074	67%	Anthony Fusco Jr.	60,606	30%	Joseph A. Fortunato	Independent	4,469	2%	*
2002	Bill Pascrell Jr.	88,101	67%	Jared Silverman	40,318	31%	Joseph A. Fortunato	Green	3,400	3%	
2004	Bill Pascrell Jr.	152,001	69%	George Ajjan	62,747	29%	Joseph A. Fortunato	Green	4,072	2%	
2006	Bill Pascrell Jr.	97,568	71%	Jose M. Sandoval	39,053	28%	Lou Jasikoff	Libertarian	1,018	1%	
2008	Bill Pascrell Jr.	155,111	72%	Roland Straten	62,239	27%	Derek DeMarco	Libertarian	1,487	1%	
2010	Bill Pascrell Jr.	88,478	63%	Roland Straten	51,023	36%	Raymond Giangrosso	Independent	1,707	1%	
2012	Bill Pascrell Jr.	162,822	73%	Shmuley Boteach	55,091	25%	E. David Smith	Independent	1,138	0.52%	
2014	Bill Pascrell Jr.	82,498	68%	Dierdre G. Paul	36,246	30%	Nestor Montilla	Independent	1,715	1%	
2016	Bill Pascrell Jr.	162,642	69%	Hector L. Castillo	65,376	28%	Diego Rivera	Libertarian	3,327	1%	
2018	Bill Pascrell Jr.	140,832	70%	Eric P. Fisher	57,854	29%	Claudio Belusic	Libertarian	1,730	1%	
2020	Bill Pascrell Jr.	203,674	66%	Billy Prempeh	98,629	32%	Chris Auriemma	Independent	7,239	2%	
2022	Bill Pascrell Jr.	82,457	55%	Billy Prempeh	65,365	43%	Lea Sherman	Socialist Workers	1,108	0.7%	*

*Write-in and minor candidate notes: In 1998, Stephen Spinosa received 762 votes; Bernard George received 722 votes; Thomas Paine Caslander received 625 votes; and José L. Aravena received 318 votes. In 2000, Viji Sargis received 983 votes. In 2022, Sean Armstrong received 1,054 votes.

== See also ==
- List of members of the United States Congress who died in office (2000–present)

U.S. House of Representatives
Preceded by Bill Martini	Member of the U.S. House of Representatives from New Jersey's 8th congressional district 1997–2013	Succeeded by Albio Sires
Preceded by Steve Rothman	Member of the U.S. House of Representatives from New Jersey's 9th congressional district 2013–2024	Succeeded by Nellie Pou
