= John Girgenti =

American politician

John A. Girgenti

Member of the New Jersey Senate from the 35th district
- In office 1990–2012
- Preceded by: Frank X. Graves, Jr.
- Succeeded by: Nellie Pou

Personal details
- Born: August 8, 1947 (age 79) Paterson, New Jersey, U.S.
- Education: Seton Hall University (BA); St. John's University (MA)

John A. Girgenti (born August 8, 1947) is an American Democratic Party politician who served in the New Jersey Senate from 1990 to 2012, representing the 35th Legislative District. Girgenti was the Senate Majority Whip from 2004 to 2007. He is currently the Assistant Majority Leader in the Senate and serves as the Chair of the Law and Public Safety Committee, Vice-chair of the Judiciary Committee, and on the Transportation Committee.

== Education ==
Senator Girgenti received a B.A. in 1969 from Seton Hall University in South Orange, New Jersey in political science and an M.A. in 1972 from St. John's University in Queens in government and public administration. He was born in Paterson, and currently resides in Hawthorne.

== Career ==
Before entering the Senate, Girgenti served in the New Jersey General Assembly, the lower house of the New Jersey Legislature, from 1978 to 1990. While in the Assembly, the Senator served as Deputy Majority Leader in 1990, and Assistant Minority Leader from 1986 to 1989. In March 1990, he was chosen by district Democrats to fill the Senate seat left vacant by the death of Frank X. Graves, Jr., and was sworn into the Senate on April 5, 1990.

Senator Girgenti served on the Hawthorne Board of Education from 1972 to 1976, serving as its vice president from 1972 to 1973. Girgenti is a former director of the Passaic County Mental Health Department, to which he was appointed in 1976 and became board president four months later.

== Legislative program ==
Senator Girgenti has sponsored many important pieces of legislation that have become law, including a measure that requires a life sentence of community supervision for certain convicted sexual offenders who have completed their prison terms, and legislation that mandates and provides funding for sprinkler installation in New Jersey college dorms, following the Seton Hall University dormitory fire in 2000. He has also championed the law criminalizing the desecration of human remains, helping families preserve the dignity and respect of their deceased loved ones and has worked to keep criminals from profiting off of the sales of 'murderabilia.' He has also been opposed to the sale of realistic or replica toy guns to children and was a prime sponsor of the law mandating child-proof firearms or 'Smart Guns' be sold in the State.

Girgenti was one of the first Senators to call for enhanced fingerprinting requirements for state employees involved with domestic security, following the September 11 attacks and proposed legislation to update and modernize New Jersey's background check laws so that towns and communities can identify potential threats and prevent them from obtaining jobs where they could harm residents.

The Senator has also fought to create the State Public Safety Interoperable Communications Coordinating Council, which would allow first responders — police, firefighters and emergency workers — to communicate between agencies on a single assigned radio frequency. Girgenti has also pushed for increased aid to the New Jersey National Guard, helping to enact legislation which increases the base pay of Guard members when on active duty in the State. On January 7, 2010, the Senator, along with several other Democrats representing urban areas, voted against a measure that would have permitted same-sex marriages in New Jersey.
