= North Haledon School District =

School district in Passaic County, New Jersey, US

Coordinates: 40.955373°N 74.181562°W

Address
- 515 High Mountain Road North Haledon, Passaic County, New Jersey, 07508; United States

District information
- Grades: PreK-8
- Superintendent: Stephanie Bonaparte
- Business administrator: Tina Iaccheo
- Schools: 2

Students and staff
- Enrollment: 617 (as of 2023–24)
- Faculty: 59.3 FTEs
- Student–teacher ratio: 10.4:1

Other information
- District Factor Group: FG
- Website: www.nhschools.net
Ind.	Per pupil	District spending	Rank (*)	K-8 average	%± vs. average
1A	Total Spending	$16,202	14	$18,891	−14.2%
1	Budgetary Cost	11,327	6	14,159	−20.0%
2	Classroom Instruction	7,377	7	8,659	−14.8%
6	Support Services	1,588	13	2,167	−26.7%
8	Administrative Cost	1,393	12	1,547	−10.0%
10	Operations & Maintenance	901	3	1,612	−44.1%
13	Extracurricular Activities	44	9	104	−57.7%
16	Median Teacher Salary	51,755	4	61,136
Data from NJDoE 2014 Taxpayers' Guide to Education Spending. *Of K-8 districts with 401-750 students. Lowest spending=1; Highest=64

The North Haledon School District is a comprehensive community public school district that serves students in pre-kindergarten through eighth grade from North Haledon, in Passaic County, in the U.S. state of New Jersey.

As of the 2023–24 school year, the district, comprised of two schools, had an enrollment of 617 students and 59.3 classroom teachers (on an FTE basis), for a student–teacher ratio of 10.4:1.

The district had been classified by the New Jersey Department of Education as being in District Factor Group "FG", the fourth-highest of eight groupings. District Factor Groups organize districts statewide to allow comparison by common socioeconomic characteristics of the local districts. From lowest socioeconomic status to highest, the categories are A, B, CD, DE, FG, GH, I and J.

For ninth through twelfth grades, public school students attend Manchester Regional High School, which serves students from Haledon, North Haledon, and Prospect Park. The school is located in Haledon. North Haledon residents had successfully voted in 2003 to leave the district, choosing to send their high school aged students to Midland Park High School in nearby Bergen County, New Jersey. In August 2004, the New Jersey Supreme Court decided against North Haledon, citing that the town's exit from the district would shift the ethnic and racial balance of the high school. As of the 2023–24 school year, the high school had an enrollment of 819 students and 60.0 classroom teachers (on an FTE basis), for a student–teacher ratio of 13.7:1.

In recent years however, many students have been attending many other schools, with a smaller number attending Manchester Regional High School. These schools include DePaul Catholic High School, Paramus Catholic High School, Don Bosco Preparatory High School, Bergen Catholic High School, and Passaic County Technical Institute.

== Schools ==
Schools in the district (with 2023–24 enrollment data from the National Center for Education Statistics) are:

Elementary school

- Memorial School with 353 students in grades PreK–4
  - Melissa Tait, principal

Middle school

- High Mountain School with 260 students in grades 5–8
  - Michael Escalante, principal

== Administration ==
Core members of the district's administration are:

- Stephanie Bonaparte, superintendent
- Tina Iaccheo, business administrator

== Board of education ==
The district's board of education, comprised of nine members, sets policy and oversees the fiscal and educational operation of the district through its administration. As a Type II school district, the board's trustees are elected directly by voters to serve three-year terms of office on a staggered basis, with three seats up for election each year held (since 2013) as part of the November general election. The board appoints a superintendent to oversee the district's day-to-day operations and a business administrator to supervise the business functions of the district.
