= Haledon School District =

School district in Passaic County, New Jersey, US

Address
- 70 Church Street Haledon, Passaic County, New Jersey, 07508; United States
- Coordinates: 40.941064°N 74.18245°W

District information
- Grades: PreK-8
- Superintendent: Christopher Wacha
- Business administrator: Lameka Augustin
- Schools: 1

Students and staff
- Enrollment: 1,035 (as of 2022–23)
- Faculty: 96.5 FTEs
- Student–teacher ratio: 10.7:1

Other information
- District Factor Group: B
- Website: www.haledon.org
Ind.	Per pupil	District spending	Rank (*)	K-8 average	%± vs. average
1A	Total Spending	$15,449	14	$18,891	−18.2%
1	Budgetary Cost	13,224	29	14,159	−6.6%
2	Classroom Instruction	8,650	46	8,659	−0.1%
6	Support Services	1,891	27	2,167	−12.7%
8	Administrative Cost	1,420	27	1,547	−8.2%
10	Operations & Maintenance	1,144	8	1,612	−29.0%
13	Extracurricular Activities	102	48	104	−1.9%
16	Median Teacher Salary	56,020	14	61,136
Data from NJDoE 2014 Taxpayers' Guide to Education Spending. *Of K-8 districts with more than 750 students. Lowest spending=1; Highest=84

The Haledon School District is a community public school district that serves students in pre-kindergarten through eighth grade from Haledon, in Passaic County, in the U.S. state of New Jersey.

As of the 2022–23 school year, the district, comprised of one school, had an enrollment of 1,035 students and 96.5 classroom teachers (on an FTE basis), for a student–teacher ratio of 10.7:1.

The district is classified by the New Jersey Department of Education as being in District Factor Group "B", the second-lowest of eight groupings. District Factor Groups organize districts statewide to allow comparison by common socioeconomic characteristics of the local districts. From lowest socioeconomic status to highest, the categories are A, B, CD, DE, FG, GH, I and J.

For ninth through twelfth grades, public school students attend Manchester Regional High School, located in Haledon, which also serves students from North Haledon, and Prospect Park. The Manchester district participates in the Interdistrict Public School Choice Program, which allows non-resident students to attend the district's schools without cost to their parents, with tuition paid by the state. Available slots are announced annually by grade. As of the 2022–23 school year, the high school had an enrollment of 811 students and 61.5 classroom teachers (on an FTE basis), for a student–teacher ratio of 13.2:1.

== School ==
Schools in the district are:

- Haledon Public School, which had an enrollment of 1,028 students in the 2022–23 school year.
  - Christopher Wacha, principal

== Administration ==
Core members of the district's administration are:

- Christopher Wacha, superintendent. Hernandez serves as a joint superintendent with the Manchester Regional High School District.
- Lameka Augustin, business administrator and board secretary

== Board of education ==
The district's board of education, comprised of nine members, sets policy and oversees the fiscal and educational operation of the district through its administration. As a Type II school district, the board's trustees are elected directly by voters to serve three-year terms of office on a staggered basis, with three seats up for election each year held (since 2013) as part of the November general election. The board appoints a superintendent to oversee the district's day-to-day operations and a business administrator to supervise the business functions of the district.
