= Prospect Park School District =

School district in Passaic County, New Jersey, US

Address
- 290 North 8th Street Prospect Park, Passaic County, New Jersey, 07508; United States
- Coordinates: 40.933179°N 74.172362°W

District information
- Grades: PreK-8
- Superintendent: Hector Montes
- Business administrator: Karen Johnson (interim)
- Schools: 2

Students and staff
- Enrollment: 834 (as of 2023–24)
- Faculty: 80.7 FTEs
- Student–teacher ratio: 10.3:1

Other information
- District Factor Group: B
- Website: www.prospectparknj.com
Ind.	Per pupil	District spending	Rank (*)	K-8 average	%± vs. average
1A	Total Spending	$15,237	13	$18,891	−19.3%
1	Budgetary Cost	11,904	14	14,159	−15.9%
2	Classroom Instruction	7,662	18	8,659	−11.5%
6	Support Services	1,545	12	2,167	−28.7%
8	Administrative Cost	1,511	36	1,547	−2.3%
10	Operations & Maintenance	1,121	7	1,612	−30.5%
13	Extracurricular Activities	4	1	104	−96.2%
16	Median Teacher Salary	61,850	48	61,136
Data from NJDoE 2014 Taxpayers' Guide to Education Spending. *Of K-8 districts with more than 750 students. Lowest spending=1; Highest=84

The Prospect Park School District is a community public school district that serves students in pre-kindergarten through eighth grade from Prospect Park, in Passaic County, in the U.S. state of New Jersey.

As of the 2023–24 school year, the district, comprised of two schools, had an enrollment of 834 students and 80.7 classroom teachers (on an FTE basis), for a student–teacher ratio of 10.3:1.

For ninth through twelfth grades, public school students attend Manchester Regional High School, which also serves students from Haledon and North Haledon. As of the 2023–24 school year, the high school had an enrollment of 819 students and 60.0 classroom teachers (on an FTE basis), for a student–teacher ratio of 13.7:1.

== History ==
The district's original school, Prospect Park Elementary School, has expanded multiple times to accommodate its growing student body, including a $1.5 million preschool expansion completed in 2012.

As of the 2014–15 school year, Prospect Park's share of funding for the Manchester had more than doubled in the previous decade, with property taxes for the regional district rising nearly $700 on the average home in the previous two years after a 2013 change by the commissioner of the New Jersey Department of Education to the district's funding formula that allocated costs with half based on enrollment and half based on valuation, a formula that benefited North Haledon. Haledon and Prospect Park had argued that property valuation should be the basis for assessing district taxes, while North Haledon, with the largest property valuation, had argued that funding should be based exclusively on enrollment.

The district had been classified by the New Jersey Department of Education as being in District Factor Group "B", the second lowest of eight groupings. District Factor Groups organize districts statewide to allow comparison by common socioeconomic characteristics of the local districts. From lowest socioeconomic status to highest, the categories are A, B, CD, DE, FG, GH, I and J.

== Schools ==
Schools in the district (with 2023–24 enrollment data from the National Center for Education Statistics) are:

- Prospect Park School Number 1, with 652 students in grades PreK–6
- Prospect Park School Number Two / Middle School, with 162 students in grades 7–8

== Administration ==
Core members of the district's administration are:

- Hector Montes, superintendent
- Karen Johnson, interim school business administrator and board secretary

== Board of education ==
The district's board of education, comprised of seven members, sets policy and oversees the fiscal and educational operation of the district through its administration. As a Type II school district, the board's trustees are elected directly by voters to serve three-year terms of office on a staggered basis, with either two or three seats up for election each year held (since 2012) as part of the November general election. The board appoints a superintendent to oversee the district's day-to-day operations and a business administrator to supervise the business functions of the district.
