= Hooverville =

Great Depression shanty towns

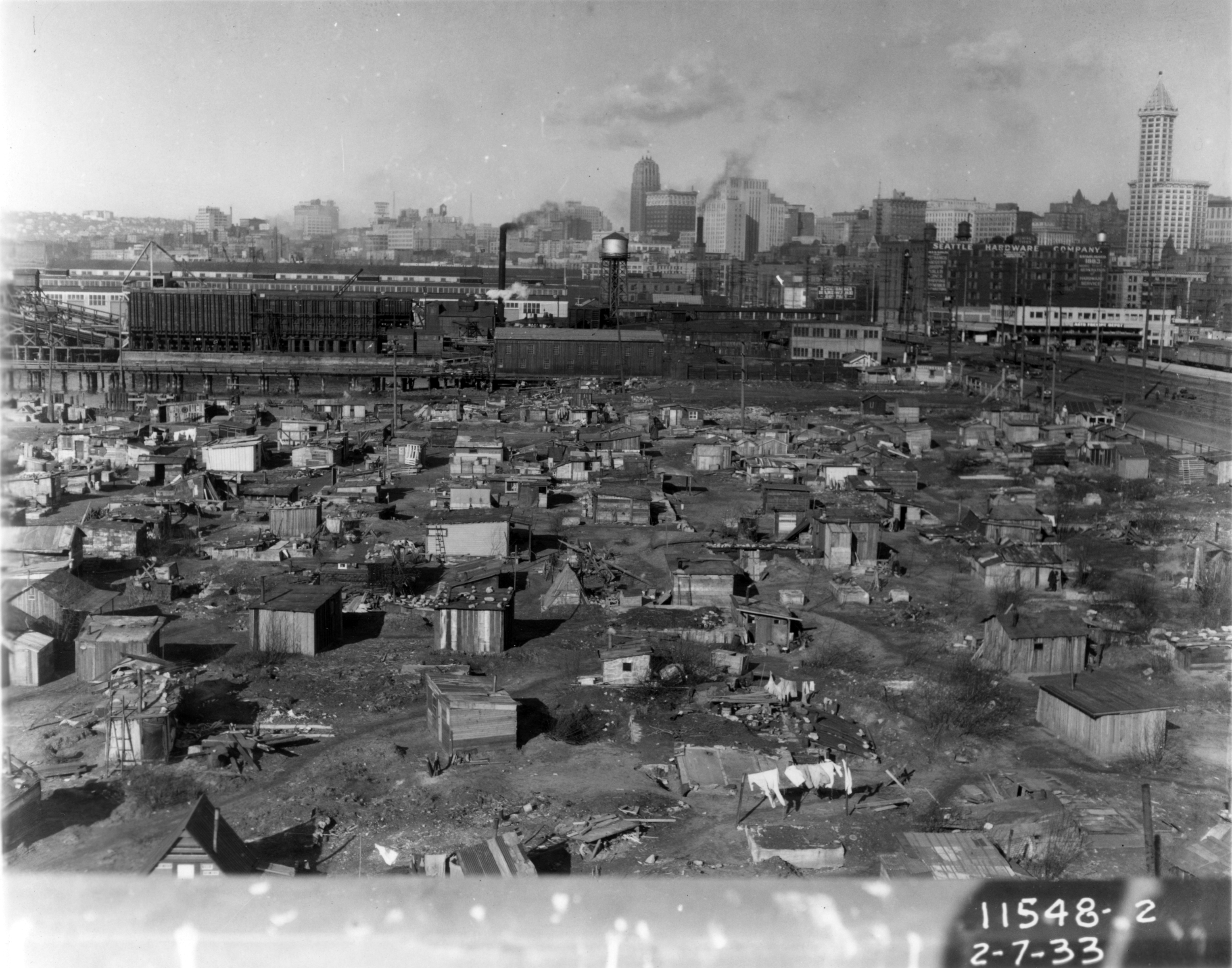
A Hooverville in Seattle, 1933

Hoovervilles were shanty towns and slums built during the Great Depression by the homeless in the United States. They were named after Herbert Hoover, who was president of the United States during the onset of the Depression and was widely blamed for it. The term was coined by Charles Michelson. There were hundreds of Hoovervilles across the country during the 1930s.

== Description ==
Homelessness was present before the Great Depression, and was a common sight before 1929. Most large cities built municipal lodging houses for the homeless, but the Depression exponentially increased demand. The homeless clustered in shanty towns close to free soup kitchens. These settlements were often trespassing on private lands, but they were frequently tolerated or ignored out of necessity. Franklin D. Roosevelt's New Deal enacted special relief programs aimed at the homeless under the Federal Transient Service (FTS), which operated from 1933 to 1939, though this did not mitigate the prevalence of Hoovervilles.

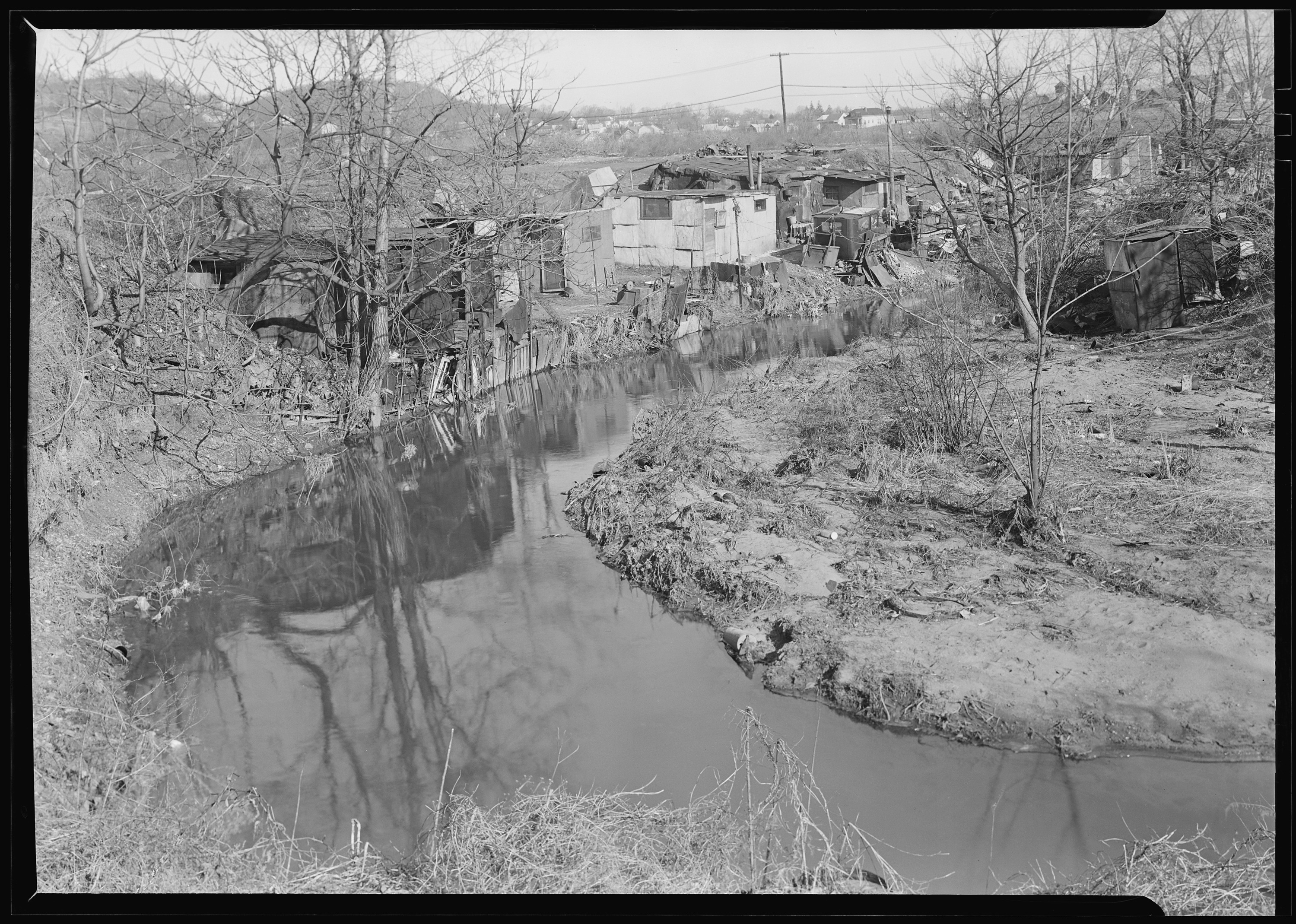
Paterson, New Jersey, 1937. Bachelor shacks in the outskirts of Paterson on "Molly Ann Brook".

Some of the men who were forced to live in these conditions possessed construction skills, and were able to build their houses out of stone. Most people, however, resorted to building their residences out of wood from crates, cardboard, scraps of metal, or whatever materials were available to them. They usually had a small stove, bedding and a couple of simple cooking implements. Men, women, and children alike lived in Hoovervilles. Most of these unemployed residents of the Hoovervilles relied on public charities or begged for food from those who had housing during this era.

Democrats coined other similar terms that were jabs at Herbert Hoover: "Hoover blankets" were old newspapers used as blanketing, a "Hoover flag" was an empty pocket turned inside out, "Hoover leather" was cardboard used to line a shoe when the sole wore through, and a "Hoover wagon" was an automobile with horses hitched to it (often with the engine removed).

After 1940, the economy recovered, unemployment fell, and shanty housing eradication programs destroyed all the Hoovervilles.

== Population of Hoovervilles ==
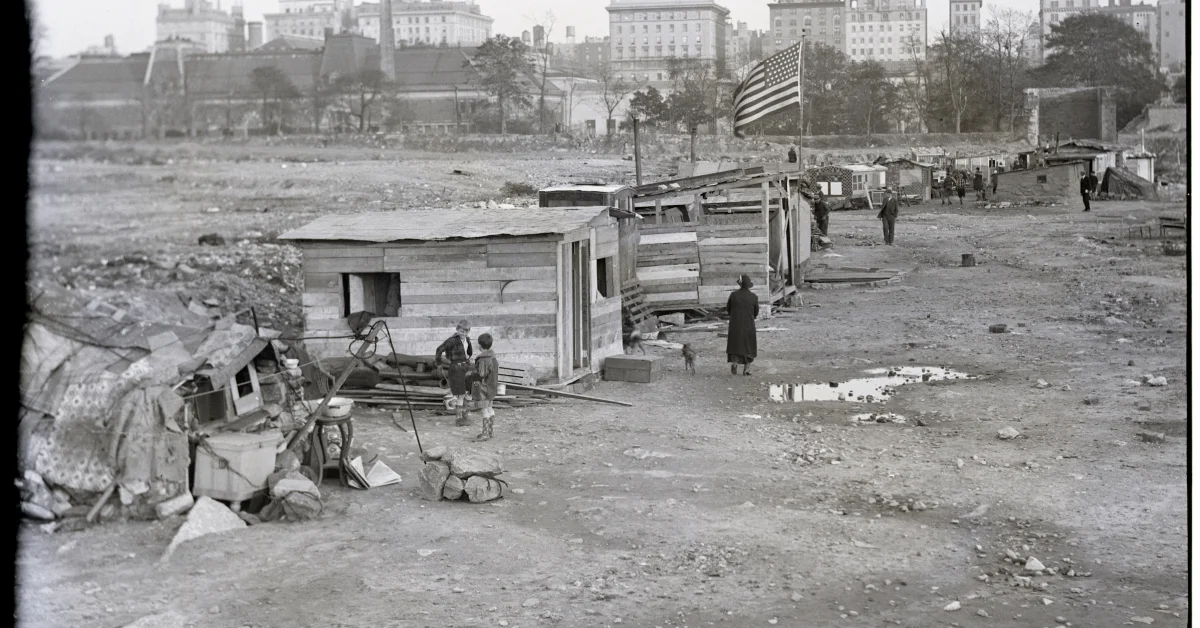
Hooverville in Central Park, New York, during the Great Depression. An American flag flies over one of the shanties.

While some Hoovervilles created a sort of government, most were unorganized collections of shanty houses. This lack of organization has made it difficult to identify the populations within Hoovervilles. Some claim to have been made up of men, women, and children, while others claim to only have had men.

One exceptional Hooverville of Seattle, Washington, held a structured government and collected extensive documentation. This Hooverville had its very own unofficial "mayor", Jesse Jackson. The city of Seattle tolerated the unemployed living situation and imposed loose building and sanitation rules. A request from the city was that women and children would not be allowed to live in the shantytown. This was supervised by "mayor" Jackson, who also led the Vigilance Committee. Donald Francis Roy, a citizen of Seattle's Hooverville, took detailed recordings of the population during his time there. In his journal, he states that of the 639 residents of the town, only 7 of them were women.

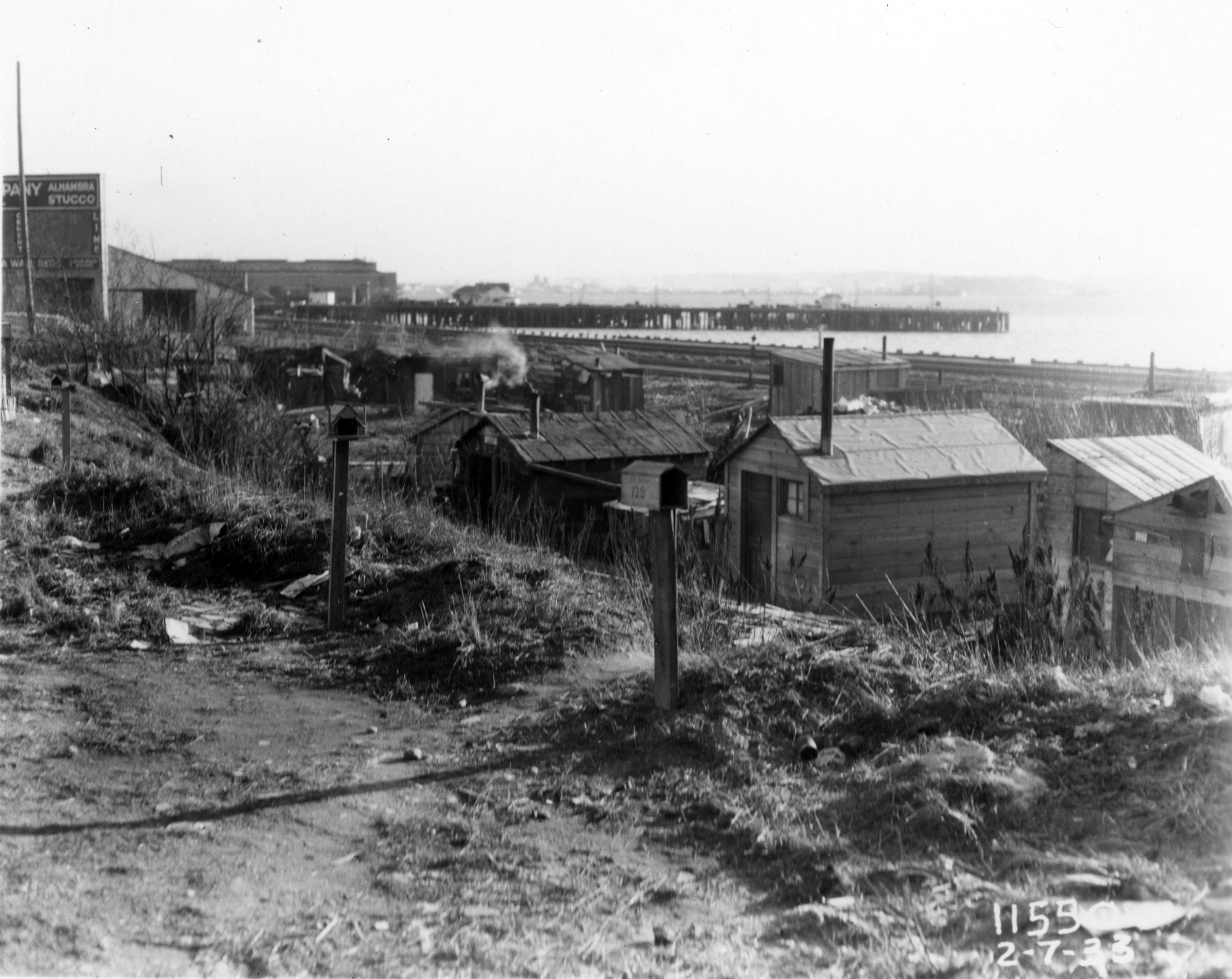
Hooverville on the Seattle waterfront, 1933

However, not every Hooverville fits this description. Photographs from shantytowns across the country show images of families, including women and children, dwelling in their makeshift home.

Regardless of the gender of the residents, Hoovervilles served as a common ground for many nationalities and ethnicities. Economic disparity in the United States during the 1930s was not limited to American-born individuals. Migrant workers and immigrants greatly suffered from the lack of work and made up a large portion of the Hoovervilles across the country.

Roy's 1934 census in Seattle's Hooverville provides a breakdown of the population by ethnicity and nationality. His records show populations of Japanese, Mexican, Filipino, Native American, Costa Rican, Chilean, and Black men. Nearly 29 percent of the population was non-white. Among the white population, nationalities included English, Irish, Polish, Spanish, Italian, Russian, and Scandinavian. A few of the whites in Seattle's Hooverville were poor migrants from the Midwest and Southern states.

Roy documents a unique spirit of tolerance and amiability between ethnic groups. He wrote that the racial barriers constructed in 'normal' society did not stand within the Hooverville. Black and white men would share homes out of convenience and, likewise, exemplify camaraderie and friendship. Roy noted that only the Filipinos and Mexican men were segregated, generally due to language rather than racial discrimination.

== Notable Hoovervilles ==
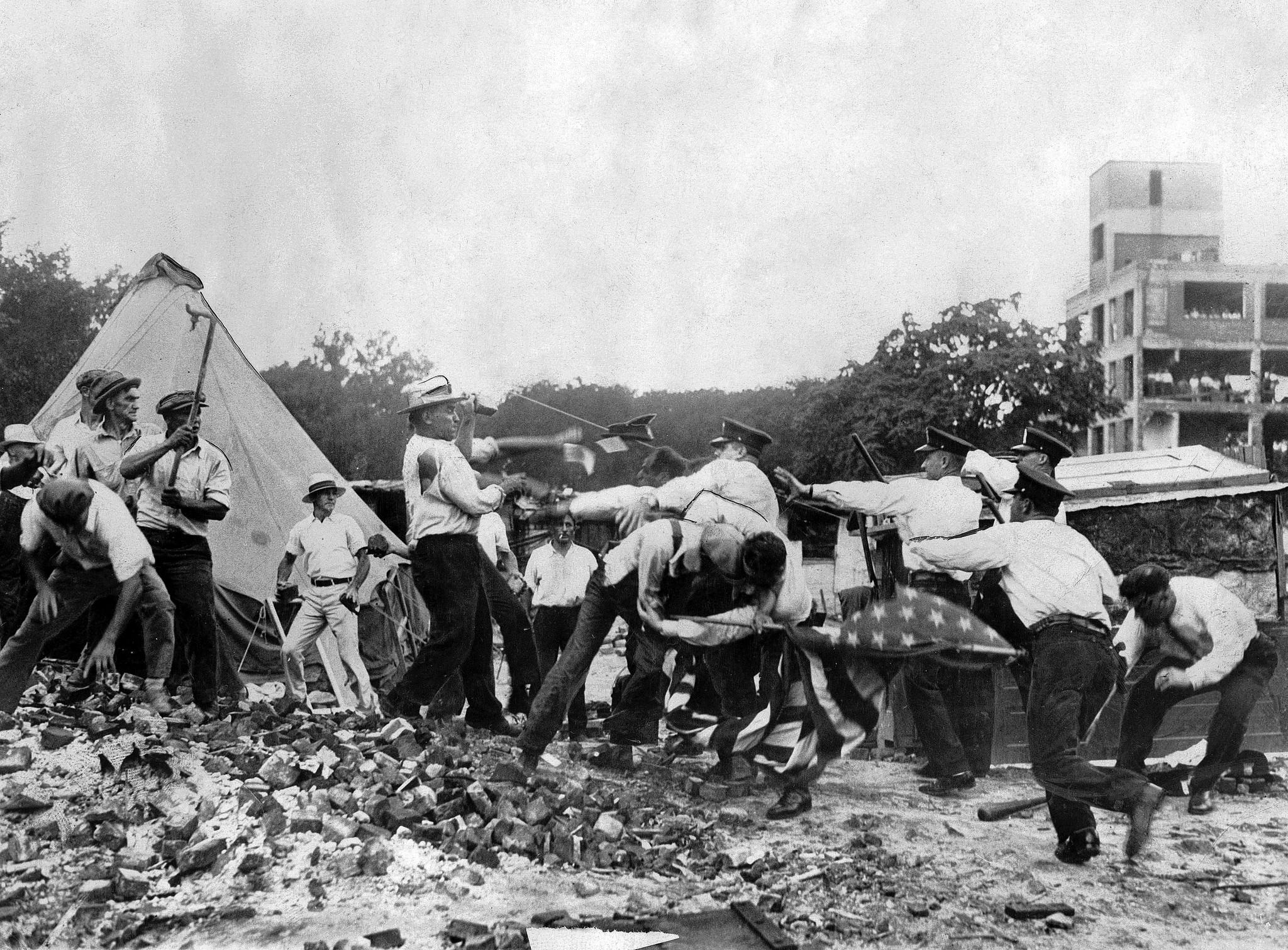
Bonus Army marchers confront the police in Washington, D.C.

Among the hundreds of Hoovervilles across the U.S. during the 1930s were those in:

- Anacostia in the District of Columbia: The Bonus Army, a group of World War I veterans seeking expedited benefits, established a Hooverville in 1932. Many of these men came from afar, illegally by riding on railroad freight trains to join the movement. At its maximum there were 15,000 people living there. The camp was demolished by units of the U.S. Army, commanded by Gen. Douglas MacArthur.
- Central Park, New York City: Scores of homeless families camped out at the Great Lawn at Central Park, then an empty reservoir.
- Riverside Park, New York City: A shantytown occupied Riverside Park at 72nd Street during the depression.
- Seattle had eight Hoovervilles during the 1930s. Its largest Hooverville on the tidal flats adjacent to the Port of Seattle lasted from 1932 to 1941.
- St. Louis in 1930 had the largest Hooverville in America. It consisted of four distinct sectors. St. Louis's racially integrated Hooverville depended upon private philanthropy, had an unofficial mayor, created its own churches and other social institutions, and remained a viable community until 1936, when the federal Works Progress Administration allocated slum clearance funds for the area.

== See also ==
- Reaganville
