= Molly Ann Brook =

Tributary of the Passaic River

Molly Ann Brook Molly Ann's Brook
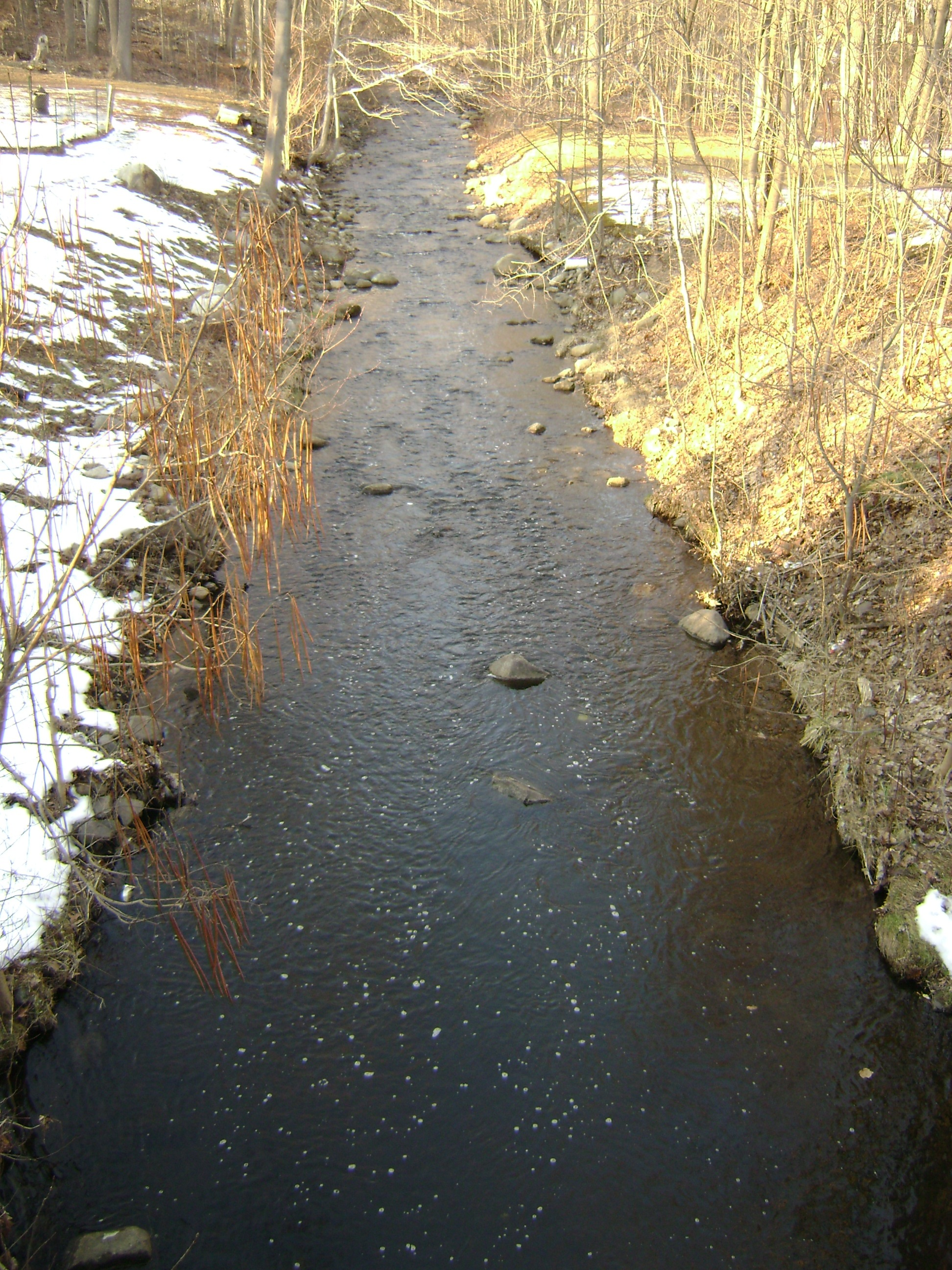
- Molly Ann Brook viewed from Squaw Brook Road in North Haledon

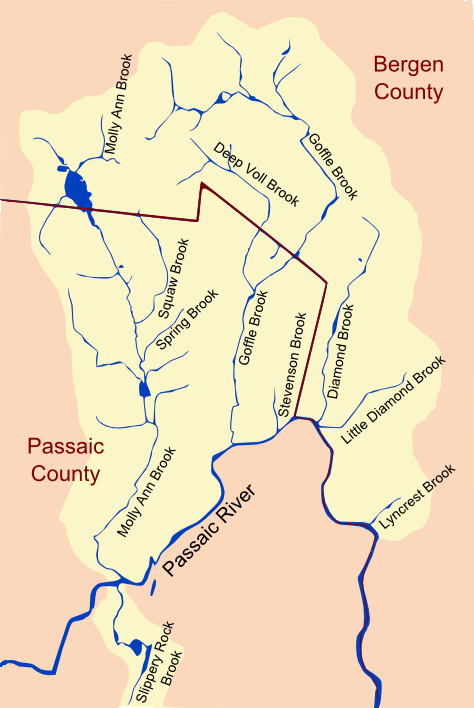
- Major Tributaries of the North Bend of the Passaic River

Location
- Country: United States
- State: New Jersey
- Counties: Passaic, Bergen

Physical characteristics
- Source
  - location: Franklin Lakes, Bergen County, New Jersey, United States
  - coordinates: 40°59′34.37″N 74°11′34.15″W
  - elevation: 495 ft (151 m)
- Mouth: Passaic River
  - location: Paterson, Passaic County, New Jersey, United States
  - coordinates: 40°54′47.26″N 74°11′18.60″W
  - elevation: 117 ft (36 m)
- Length: 6.75 mi (10.86 km)

Basin features
- Tributaries
  - left: Squaw Brook

Molly Ann Brook (sometimes Molly Ann's Brook) is a tributary of the Passaic River which flows south between the northern ranges of First Watchung Mountain and Second Watchung Mountain in Passaic County and Bergen County, New Jersey. Traveling north from its confluence with the Passaic River, Molly Ann Brook passes through the city of Paterson and the boroughs of Haledon, Prospect Park, North Haledon and Franklin Lakes.

== History ==
Molly Ann Brook, like its neighboring Passaic River tributaries, played host to General Lafayette's troops during the American Revolutionary War. Known as Krakeel Val in 1780, the brook passed along the western edge of Lafayette's Grand Parade, running through the area where General St Clair's troops were stationed in October and November.

In the late 18th century, the area of Westside Park, at the mouth of the brook in Paterson, was home to Dirck and Molly Van Houten and their children, one of the original pioneer families to settle the area. Adreyean, the ninth child of the family, distinguished himself from other Van Houtens in the area by calling himself Molly's Yawn (Dutch), or Molly's son. Living at his parents' homestead, the brook running through the property came to be known as Molly Yawn's Brook, which was later corrupted to the current Molly Ann's Brook.

In the early 20th century, the brook became well known for its intense floods, particularly a massive flood affecting four towns in July, 1945. As a response, overflow tunnels were proposed in the late 1950s. Ultimately, in 1999 the United States Army Corps of Engineers, Philadelphia District completed a flood control project in the lower reaches of the brook to protect against 50-year storm events. The project significantly deepened and widened the brook through the construction of concrete and rock-lined channels.

== Description ==
Molly Ann Brook rises south of Franklin Ave in Franklin Lakes, about two thousand feet west of Goffle Pond, where the headwaters of the neighboring Goffle Brook are located. After flowing through High Mountain Golf Club, Molly Ann Brook joins two smaller tributaries to form Haledon Reservoir, an approximately three thousand foot by one thousand foot artificial lake. A second man made lake, Lower Basin Pond, exists directly below Haledon Reservoir, followed by a swimming hole about two thousand feet downstream.

In North Haledon, Molly Ann Brook is joined by its most significant tributary, First Brook, which extends north from its junction with Molly Ann Brook into the town of Wyckoff. Three quarters of a mile downstream of the confluence with First Brook, Molly Ann Brook is joined by the tiny Spring Brook just south of Overlook Ave. Another smaller brook paralleling Ballentine Drive and draining part of the western flank of First Watchung Mountain in North Haledon then merges with the brook before it reaches Oldham Pond. At Oldham Pond, Molly Ann Brook is joined by its second most significant tributary, a steeply graded stream draining the southwestern faces Mount Cecchino and High Mountain, the highest peaks of Second Watchung Mountain.

Beyond Oldham Pond, Molly Ann Brook is quickly joined by one other tributary flowing east off Second Watchung Mountain just south of the Haledon-North Haledon border. Here the brook transitions from the suburban environments of Franklin Lakes and North Haledon to the urbanized environments of Prospect Park, Haledon, and Paterson. Bound by concrete flood control walls, the brook takes on an artificial appearance for much of its lower reach. Ultimately, Molly Ann Brook joins the Passaic River in Paterson about three thousand feet west of the Great Falls, becoming the last tributary to reach the Passaic before the river's waters plunge over the imposing geologic barrier.

== See also ==
- List of rivers of New Jersey
