= Manchester Township, Passaic County, New Jersey =

Coordinates: 40.950°N 74.171°W

Manchester Township was a township that existed in New Jersey, United States, from 1837 until it was dissolved in 1908.

The township was formed on February 7, 1837, from portions of Saddle River Township in Bergen County, becoming part of Passaic County which was created on that same date.

As originally constituted, the Township included portions of present-day Hawthorne (formed March 24, 1898), Haledon (April 8, 1908), North Haledon, Prospect Park, Totowa and most of the First Ward of Paterson.

With the creation of the Borough of Haledon, Manchester Township was dissolved that same day, April 8, 1908.

== Sources ==
- Municipal Incorporations of the State of New Jersey (according to Counties), prepared by the Division of Local Government, Department of the Treasury (New Jersey); December 1, 1958.
