= Joseph J. Helble =

American academic

15th President of Lehigh University
- Incumbent
- Assumed office August 16, 2021
- Preceded by: Nathan Urban (interim); John D. Simon

Personal details
- Education: Lehigh University (BS); Massachusetts Institute of Technology (PhD)
- Scientific career
- Fields: chemical engineering
- Workplaces: Dartmouth College; Lehigh University
- Thesis: Mechanisms of ash particle formation and growth during pulverized coal combustion (1987)
- Doctoral advisor: Adel Sarofim

Joseph J. Helble is an American academic. He has been the president of Lehigh University since 2021. He was previously the dean of the Thayer School of Engineering of Dartmouth College from 2009 to 2021 and the provost of Dartmouth College from 2018 to 2021. A chemical engineer by training, he is an alumnus of Lehigh and received his PhD from the Massachusetts Institute of Technology.

== Early life ==
Raised in North Haledon, New Jersey, Helble is a Lehigh graduate from the class of 1982. A student in the P.C. Rossin engineering school with a degree in chemical engineering, he also worked as a Gryphon. He graduated from the Massachusetts Institute of Technology in 1987 with a PhD in chemical engineering. He worked in the private sector for Physical Sciences, Inc., as well as working as a science policy fellow for the U.S. Environmental Protection Agency and the American Association for the Advancement of Science, as well as being named a Revelle Fellow. Authoring over 100 scientific papers and three books, he was also awarded the National Academy of Engineering's 2014 Bernard M. Gordon Prize for Innovation in Engineering and Technology Education. He also received the National Science Foundation's CAREER award in 1998.

== Academic leadership ==
=== Dartmouth ===
From 2018 to 2021, Helble was the provost of Dartmouth College, and from 2005 to 2018 he was the dean of Dartmouth's Thayer School of Engineering.

=== Lehigh ===
On July 30, 2021, Lehigh University President John D. Simon stepped down with provost Nathan Urban acting as president until Joseph J. Helble assumed the office on August 16 during homecoming weekend or Founders Weekend.

Helble's naming as president was well received by the engineering alumni and students of Lehigh due to Helble's former office of Provost of Dartmouth's Engineering school. Additionally, Helble's predecessor, John D. Simon, clashed frequently with the student body, with the conflict coming to a head with the school's COVID policy, as such, students were optimistic that Helble's leadership would usher in a new period of Student-Administration relationships.

Entering his term he stated that he supported the policies of former President Simon and that the College of Health is the immediate priority of his initial administration. He also stated that he would increase the transparency between the school and the students, and will strive to make the school more politically neutral and increase its academic rankings. He also stated that he seeks to improve interdisciplinary studies between the different schools at Lehigh.

In November 2022 a 22-year old Black Lehigh University student was harassed and attacked by a pair of white assailants who used racist epithets. No charges were pressed and both the Lehigh University Police Department (LUPD) and the Bethlehem Police Department (BPD) determined that the attack wasn't racially motivated. In the following spring semester, Helble issued an update on the situation and stated that “As we begin a new semester, I want to express my continued commitment to providing such an environment where discrimination and racism, hate, and violence, have no home.”

In an effort to drive student engagement, Helble has hosted a series called Community Conversation, where he informs the student body about changing school policy. During which he announced the restructuring of the school's Title IX office, integrating Diversity, equity, and inclusion into the school's strategic vision and coining the term "radical interdisciplinarity" when describing Lehigh's undergraduate and graduate learning programs.

At a presentation of the yearly action plan in June 2023, Helble announced that the school was going to cooperate more with the Bethlehem city government, namely by informing the council on issues developing at the school prior to official school releases and consulting with the city council for future action plans.

In April 2023, Helble announced that the school would be purchasing three historic Lutheran churches and opening discussions with the Lehigh community for their fate.

On October 3, 2023, Helble announced that families making less than $75,000 per year would be able to attend Lehigh for free in the form of a new tuition grant called "The Lehigh Commitment" that works towards ensuring a "Lehigh for everyone".

On November 3, 2023, Helble announced Lehigh would be increasing their "Go Beyond" fundraiser from $1 billion to include an additional $1.25 billion by 2028. Stating that the funds are needed for continued expansion of student housing and the College of Health as well as expanding community outreach programs.

== Personal life ==
Helble is married to Rebecca Dabora, a manufacturing officer at Adagio Therapeutics, and has three children. Helble is an active runner, having competed in the Boston Marathon. Helble uses his running to host "Pace the Prez" events where Lehigh students have an opportunity to go on a morning run with him.
