= Centro Intercultural de Documentación =

Mexican Catholic university

The Centro Intercultural de Documentación (CIDOC) was founded by Ivan Illich in 1965 as a higher education campus for development workers and missionaries. It was located in Cuernavaca (Mexico), at the Rancho Tetela.

== Early history ==
In Celebration of Awareness: A Call for Institutional Revolution, Illich writes that the intention of the school was to counteract a Papal command of 1960 which enjoined US and Canadian religious superiors to send 10% of their priests and nuns to South America. Illich was convinced that this project would do more harm than good. He intended the Centro to serve as a training station for such clergy and development workers, aiming to educate them about the negative effects of their development and education agenda. He called it "a center for de-Yankeefication" The school also offered Spanish language courses. Illich credits Feodora Stancioff and Brother Gerry Morris as co-founders.

== Achievements ==
The center pursued a significant publication program in various formats: Dossiers, Sondeos, Documenta, etc. It also issued catalogues of its publications. The Centrum für Internationale Entwicklung in Vienna now holds the a comprehensive collection of publications from the center. This collection which was previously held by the Österreichisches Lateinamerika-Institut.

== Teachers and alumni ==
Paulo Freire was a regular guest at the Centro. Other visitors, students and staff include Valentina Borremans, Everett Gendler, Robert S. Leiken, Jean Robert, Paul Goodman, John Mason Hart, Susan Sontag, Erich Fromm, Peter L. Berger, John Holt, Joel Spring, Carl Mitcham, Leo Gabriel, Augusto Salazar Bondy, André Gorz, Lini De Vries, Robert K. Logan, Sylvia Marcos, etc.
