= Bruce Huther =

American football player (born 1954)

No. 57, 58, 55
- Position: Linebacker

Personal information
- Born: July 23, 1954 (age 72); Paterson, New Jersey, U.S.
- Listed height: 6 ft 1 in (1.85 m)
- Listed weight: 221 lb (100 kg)

Career information
- High school: Haledon (NJ) Manchester
- College: New Hampshire
- NFL draft: 1977: undrafted

Career history
- Dallas Cowboys (1977–1980); Cleveland Browns (1981); Chicago Bears (1982); Dallas Cowboys (1983); Pittsburgh Maulers (USFL) (1984); Denver Gold (USFL) (1984)

Awards and highlights
- Super Bowl champion (XII); Little All-American (1976)

Career NFL statistics
- Fumble recoveries: 1
- Stats at Pro Football Reference

Bruce Albert Huther (born July 23, 1954) is an American former professional football player who was a linebacker in the National Football League (NFL) for the Dallas Cowboys, Cleveland Browns, and Chicago Bears. He played college football for the New Hampshire Wildcats football. He also played professionally for the Pittsburgh Maulers and Denver Gold of the United States Football League (USFL).

== Early life ==
Huther grew up in Haledon, New Jersey, and played high school football at Manchester Regional High School. He moved on to the University of New Hampshire, where he was a three-year starter at linebacker. He also played some fullback.

He led the team in tackles in his last two seasons, while helping the team win two Yankee Conference Championships (1975 and 1976).

== Professional career ==
=== Dallas Cowboys (first stint) ===
Huther was signed as an undrafted free agent by the Dallas Cowboys after the 1977 NFL draft. As a rookie, he played mainly on special teams and was a part of the Super Bowl XII winning team, recovering a fumble during the game.

In his second season, he was named the special teams captain and solidified his status as one of the best players on the unit. He won the team's special teams player of the year award twice. He was also considered one of the strongest players on the team.

On August 24, 1981, to make room for rookie Danny Spradlin, he was traded to the Cleveland Browns in exchange of a sixth round draft choice (#143-Ken Hammond).

=== Cleveland Browns ===
In 1981, he appeared in 16 games (2 starts), but after the team signed Tom Cousineau in the offseason, he demanded to be traded and was sent to the Chicago Bears in exchange of a seventh round draft choice (#176-Rocky Belk) on August 13, 1982.

=== Chicago Bears ===
In 1982, he was a backup linebacker with the Chicago Bears. On December 2, he was placed on the injured reserve list to make room for the recently signed Al Chesley. He was not re-signed after the season.

=== Dallas Cowboys (second stint) ===
On October 1, 1983, Huther signed as a free agent with the Dallas Cowboys to replace Scott McLean, who was out for the season. He started five games at middle linebacker in place of an injured Bob Breunig.

=== Pittsburgh Maulers (USFL) ===
In 1984, although his rights belonged to the Chicago Blitz of the United States Football League, the Pittsburgh Maulers traded for him and also convinced him not to re-sign with the Dallas Cowboys. After leading the team in tackles, he was benched the next year in favor of rookie Ernest Adams, which made Huther to eventually force his release.

=== Denver Gold (USFL) ===
On May 30, 1984, he signed as a free agent with the Denver Gold, where he played until the league folded.

== Personal life ==
Huther graduated from New Hampshire with a degree in zoology, and later earned a master's degree from the University of Texas at Dallas. In 1992, he founded Huther & Associates, an aquatic toxicology laboratory, in Denton, Texas.
