= Lini De Vries =

Lini M. De Vries
- Born: July 25, 1905; Prospect Park, New Jersey
- Died: March 27, 1982 (aged 76); Ridgewood, New Jersey
- Occupation: Public Health Nurse
- Parent(s): Elisabeth ("Betty") (De Vries) Moerkerk; Leonard Moerkerk; Bernard Pollack (biological father)

Lini M. De Vries (July 25, 1905 – March 27, 1982), born Lena Moerkerk in Prospect Park, New Jersey, was a Dutch–American author, public health nurse, and teacher. She worked as chief of American Hospital Number 3 on the Madrid-Valencia Road during the Spanish Civil War and later organized health clinics in New Mexico, California, and Puerto Rico. She moved to Mexico in 1949 after her membership in the Communist Party was exposed. In Mexico, De Vries taught medicine and public health to indigenous villagers in the Papaloapan River Basin in Oaxaca; taught anthropology and public health at the University of Veracruz; was a founder of CIDOC, a religious, educational and cultural school; and helped found Cemanahuac, an educational community in Cuernavaca, Mexico.

== Early life and family ==
Dutch was the language of her childhood home, and De Vries did not learn English until she attended grammar school. After completing the sixth grade, De Vries was sent to work in silk mills. Her work and experience in the silk mills is detailed in her autobiography (1979) Up from the Cellar. In 1921, De Vries' left the silk mills to work for a telephone company in Paterson, New Jersey. In 1925, she matriculated to a nurses training program at New Rochelle Hospital Training School for Nurses in New York. After receiving her nursing degree, De Vries married Wilbur Fuhr (June 5, 1928). A daughter, Mary Lee, was born to the couple in 1930. Shortly after Mary Lee's birth, Fuhr died unexpectedly. De Vries remarried in 1943 to Lou Stoumen and gave birth to a second daughter, Toby, in 1946. Stoumen and De Vries divorced in 1949.

== Life Work ==
De Vries is remembered for her work as a public health nurse in Mexico. Before living in Mexico, De Vries joined the Communist Party in 1935. Two years later, in 1937, she volunteered to travel to Spain with the Medical Bureau to Aid Spanish Democracy, which provided medical care for the international brigades and Spanish anti-fascist fighters during the Spanish Civil War. She was at the Madrid front in February 1937 during the Battle of Jarama. "Within four hours after the battle had begun, we had 93 wounded. Our hospital was equipped for fifty," writes De Vries of the battle in her memoirs.

Later, she was sent to Villa Paz where she oversaw the administration of the hospital of Castillejo. Recounting her efforts to sustain the running of the hospital, De Vries managed to convince the male soldiers to participate in the chores needed to free nursing hands, including dish-washing, scrubbing, washing, digging latrines. Her memoirs describe her time at Castillejo as revolutionary in the co-operative that was being formed. Moreover, she writes of the concerns of farmers and soldiers to their own futures, which led to the opening of new clinics and even new trenches that included special sections for classroom work. As such, she remembers this as a time of idealism: "This was a crusade for the freedom of man."

Upon her return to the United States, De Vries embarked on a fundraising lecture tour. When the lecture tour concluded, De Vries worked as a nurse and public health educator. She held positions with the San Miguel County Public Health Demonstration Unit in New Mexico, the Department of Public Health in Puerto Rico, and the Agricultural Workers Health and Medical Association of Southern California.

De Vries moved to Mexico in 1949. She was the director of health education for the Comisión del Papaloapan serving the indigenous communities in the Papaloapan River Valley in the states of Oaxaca and Veracruz. She was also an instructor of public health at the Universidad Veracruzana in Jalapa, Veracruz, and established summer schools for foreign students both there and at the Universidad de Morelos in Cuernavaca. In 1962, a presidential decree granted De Vries Mexican citizenship (her American citizenship was withdrawn in 1963.)

== Publications ==
- 1959: El Sótano ("The Cellar"), an autobiography that recounts her life from childhood to 1925 was published (in various versions) in both Spanish and English.
- 1965: España 1937: Memorias, an account of De Vries' experience providing medical care for the international brigades and Spanish anti-fascist fighters during Spanish Civil War.
- 1969: The People of the Mountains: Health Education Among Indian Communities in Oaxaca, Mexico details De Vries' work with the Comisión del Papaloapan.
- 1972: Please, God, Take Care of the Mule describes De Vries's life in Mexico from 1949 to 1962
- 1979: Up From the Cellar recounts her life from 1905 through 1962.

== Death ==
Lini De Vries died at age 76 on March 27, 1982, of several strokes following surgery, in Ridgewood, New Jersey. She is buried at Fair Lawn Memorial Cemetery.
