= John C. Barbour =

American politician (1895–1962)

Member of the New Jersey Senate from Passaic County
- In office 1933–1936
- Preceded by: Roy Y. Yates (1931)
- Succeeded by: Walter H. Gardner

Member of the New Jersey General Assembly from the Passaic district
- In office 1929–1932

Personal details
- Born: April 18, 1895 Haledon, New Jersey
- Died: May 25, 1962 (aged 67) Milford, Connecticut
- Party: Republican

John C. Barbour (April 18, 1895 – May 25, 1962) was an American politician who served in the New Jersey General Assembly from 1929 to 1932 and in the New Jersey Senate from 1933 to 1936.
