= Kossuth Street School =

- U.S. National Register of Historic Places
- New Jersey Register of Historic Places
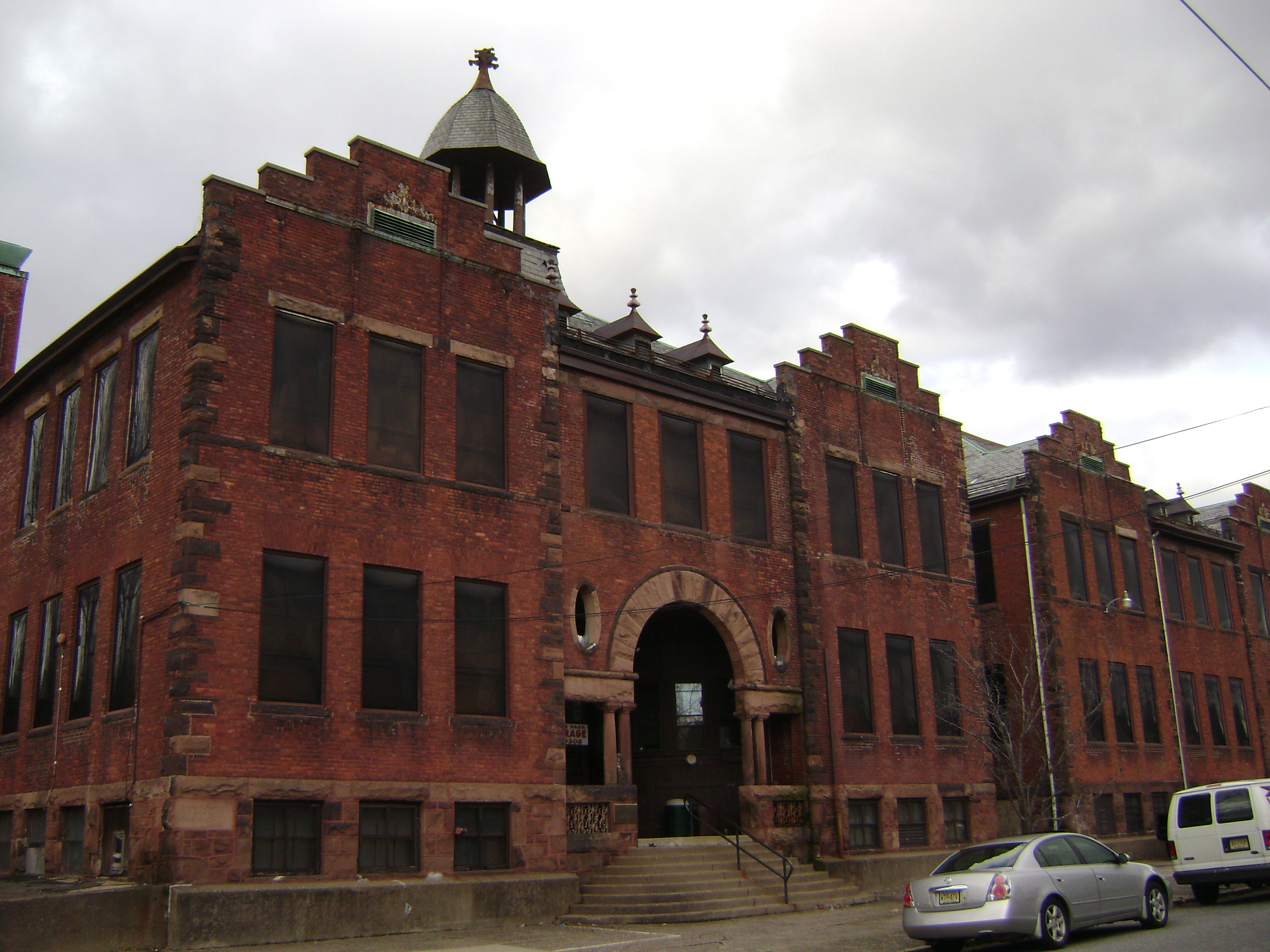
- Kossuth Street School, December 23, 2011

- Location within Passaic County, New Jersey Location within New Jersey Location within the United States
- Location: 47 Kossuth Street, Haledon, New Jersey
- Coordinates: 40°56′18″N 74°11′01″W
- Area: less than one acre
- Built: 1894
- NRHP reference No.: 80002515
- NJRHP No.: 2334

Significant dates
- Added to NRHP: April 10, 1980
- Designated NJRHP: October 26, 1979

Kossuth Street School is located in Haledon, Passaic County, New Jersey, United States. The schoolhouse was built in 1894 and was added to the National Register of Historic Places on April 10, 1980.

== See also ==
- National Register of Historic Places listings in Passaic County, New Jersey
