= Haledon, New Jersey =

Borough in Passaic County, New Jersey, US

- Borough
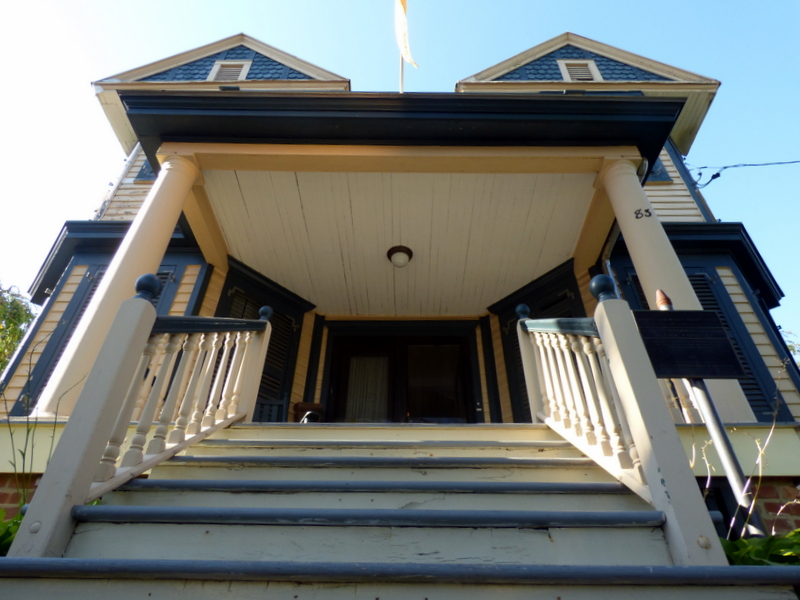
- American Labor Museum

- Seal

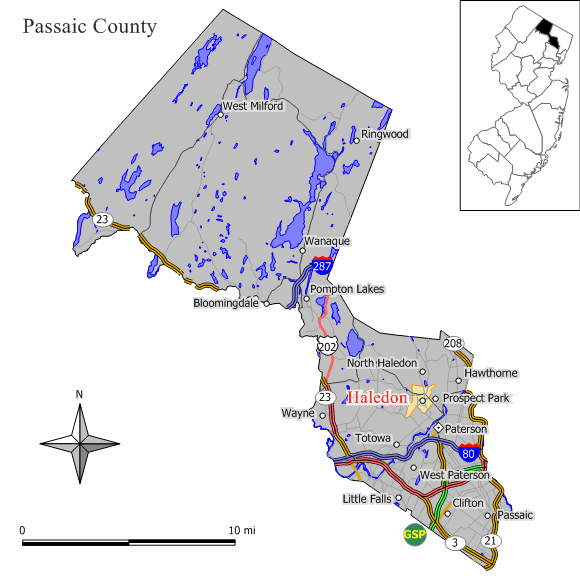
- Map of Haledon in Passaic County. Inset: Location of Passaic County highlighted in the State of New Jersey.

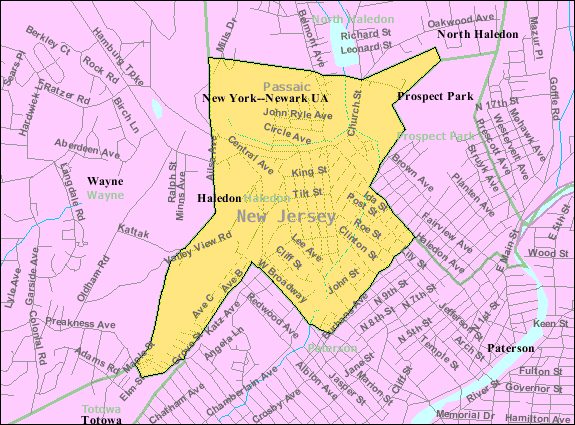
- Census Bureau map of Haledon, New Jersey

- Location in Passaic County Location in New Jersey Location in the United States
- Coordinates: 40.936989°N 74.188867°W
- Country: United States
- State: New Jersey
- County: Passaic
- Incorporated: May 21, 1908

Government
  - Type: Borough
  - Body: Borough Council
  - Mayor: Michael Johnson (D, term ends December 31, 2026)
  - Administrator / Municipal clerk (acting): Mohammad M. Ramadan

Area
  - Total: 1.22 sq mi (3.15 km^{2})
  - Land: 1.22 sq mi (3.15 km^{2})
  - Water: 0 sq mi (0.00 km^{2}) 0.08%
  - Rank: 484th of 565 in state 15th of 16 in county
- Elevation: 217 ft (66 m)

Population (2020)
  - Total: 9,052
  - Estimate (2023): 8,834
  - Rank: 262nd of 565 in state 13th of 16 in county
  - Density: 7,450.2/sq mi (2,876.5/km^{2})
  - Rank: 60th of 565 in state 5th of 16 in county
- Time zone: UTC−05:00 (Eastern (EST))
  - Summer (DST): UTC−04:00 (Eastern (EDT))
- ZIP Codes: 07508, 07538
- Area code: 973
- FIPS code: 3403129070
- GNIS feature ID: 0885240
- Website: www.haledonboronj.com

Haledon (English pronunciation: /ˈheɪldən/) is a borough in Passaic County, in the U.S. state of New Jersey. As of the 2020 United States census, the borough's population was 9,052, an increase of 734 (+8.8%) from the 2010 census count of 8,318, which in turn reflected an increase of 66 (+0.8%) from the 8,252 counted in the 2000 census.

Haledon was incorporated as a borough by an act of the New Jersey Legislature on April 8, 1908, replacing the now-defunct Manchester Township, based on the results of a referendum held on May 21, 1908.

== History ==
Haledon developed along the northern side of the industrial city of Paterson. It was settled by farmers with colonial Dutch heritage including the Van Riper, Berdan, Banta, Post and Zabriskie families. Prior to the Civil War they were joined by the Roe, Leonhard and Stansfield families, who helped establish St. Mary's Episcopal Church and leading businesses including a general store and the Leonhard Wax Company.

The area became a streetcar suburb of Paterson in the years following the Civil War, with the central area known as Haledon, while the area surrounding the large pond along High Mountain Road was called Oldham. The Paterson and Haledon Horse Rail Road Company, formed in 1871, laid trolley tracks from Paterson along the current-day Belmont Avenue, which were electrified by 1888.

Many of the trolley company's owners were among the founders of the Cedar Cliff Land Company, which bought up large portions of the area, and the street names in the borough reflect these industrialists and businessmen: Morrissee, Hoxey, Van Dyke, John Ryle and Barbour.

The flat, lower part of the community was laid out in city-sized lots of 25 by 100 feet (7.6 by 30.5 m), while the hillsides were plated as sites for larger Victorian "villas" for such individuals as Vice President Garret A. Hobart (now the location of William Paterson University) and the Barbour family of linen flax manufacturers. Haledon's villa development was rather limited and throughout much of the 20th century Haledon was a typical blue-collar community set by the small property sizes planned by the Cedar Cliff Land Company.

A never-constructed grand hotel was planned for the highest point of the community above the intersection of the current day Central and West Haledon Avenues. The Cedar Cliff Land Company ran newspaper advertisements targeted at upwardly mobile immigrants who worked in Paterson's silk industry, offering the city-sized lots for sale at auctions (with free lunches and brass bands) held at St. Mary's Parish Hall, and also opened the Cedar Cliff Silk Mill, which became one of several silk mills in the community.

The residential appeal of Haledon was to escape the crowded industrial city and still have access to the textile mills by using the trolley. As a result of the land sales of Cedar Cliff Land Company and of independent landowner William Buschmann, the town was settled by immigrants who came as skilled workers from textile centers in Europe.

Paramount Dining Car Company was based in Haledon, and built many of New Jersey's iconic stainless steel modular diners, including White Manna in Hackensack and Rosie's Diner that was once on Route 46 in Little Ferry.

Haledon was incorporated in 1908, having been the Oldham district of the former Passaic County municipality of Manchester Township.

Socialist William Bruekmann was elected mayor in 1912 by the borough's immigrant resident base of skilled silk workers. During the 1913 Paterson silk strike, Haledon's mayor offered the strikers the opportunity to hold meetings in Haledon, as worker meetings were prohibited in Paterson. The Pietro and Maria Botto House, located on the side of a hill surrounded by open spaces, provided a natural amphitheater for labor leaders of the day to address thousands of people who gathered to hear Big Bill Haywood, Carlo Tresca, Elizabeth Gurley Flynn and John Reed. The Botto House is now a National Historic Landmark and the home of the American Labor Museum.

In 2008, Councilman Alan Souto, at the time an officer with the Passaic County Sheriff's Department, was arrested for stealing heroin and cocaine from the evidence room from the sheriff's department in order to distribute narcotics, amounting to over $250,000. After being found guilty, he was sentenced to 85 months in federal prison in May 2009. Souto was replaced in April 2008 by Marc Battle, a commercial litigator and former civil rights attorney.

== Geography ==
According to the United States Census Bureau, the borough had a total area of 1.22 square miles (3.15 km^{2}), including 1.22 square miles (3.15 km^{2}) of land and <0.01 square miles (<0.01 km^{2}) of water (0.08%). The borough is home of a Passaic River inlet known as Molly Ann Brook.

Unincorporated communities, localities and place names located partially or completely within the township include Bridges Pond and Valley View.

The borough borders the Passaic County communities of North Haledon, Paterson, Prospect Park, Totowa and Wayne.

== Demographics ==
Historical population
Census	Pop.	Note	%±
1910	2,560		—
1920	3,435		34.2%
1930	4,812		40.1%
1940	5,303		10.2%
1950	6,204		17.0%
1960	6,161		−0.7%
1970	6,767		9.8%
1980	6,607		−2.4%
1990	6,951		5.2%
2000	8,252		18.7%
2010	8,318		0.8%
2020	9,052		8.8%
2023 (est.)	8,834	▼	−2.4%
Population sources: 1910–1920; 1910 1910–1930; 1940–2000 2000; 2010 2020

=== 2020 census ===
As of the 2020 census, Haledon had a population of 9,052. The median age was 36.4 years. 23.0% of residents were under the age of 18 and 13.2% were 65 years of age or older. For every 100 females, there were 91.6 males, and for every 100 females age 18 and over, there were 88.1 males.

100.0% of residents lived in urban areas, while 0.0% lived in rural areas.

There were 3,017 households, of which 40.9% had children under the age of 18 living in them. Of all households, 40.0% were married-couple households, 18.5% were households with a male householder and no spouse or partner present, and 34.6% were households with a female householder and no spouse or partner present. About 21.8% of all households were made up of individuals, and 8.6% had someone living alone who was 65 years of age or older.

There were 3,117 housing units, of which 3.2% were vacant. The homeowner vacancy rate was 1.1% and the rental vacancy rate was 2.2%.

Racial composition as of the 2020 census
Race	Number	Percent
White	3,233	35.7%
Black or African American	1,184	13.1%
American Indian and Alaska Native	81	0.9%
Asian	648	7.2%
Native Hawaiian and Other Pacific Islander	1	0.0%
Some other race	2,521	27.9%
Two or more races	1,384	15.3%
Hispanic or Latino (of any race)	4,476	49.4%

=== 2010 census ===
The 2010 United States census counted 8,318 people, 2,778 households, and 2,028 families in the borough. The population density was 7,203.9 per square mile (2,781.4/km^{2}). There were 2,932 housing units at an average density of 2,539.3 per square mile (980.4/km^{2}). The racial makeup was 62.38% (5,189) White, 11.77% (979) Black or African American, 0.53% (44) Native American, 6.35% (528) Asian, 0.10% (8) Pacific Islander, 14.72% (1,224) from other races, and 4.16% (346) from two or more races. Hispanic or Latino of any race were 41.60% (3,460) of the population.

Of the 2,778 households, 39.0% had children under the age of 18; 44.1% were married couples living together; 22.0% had a female householder with no husband present and 27.0% were non-families. Of all households, 21.2% were made up of individuals and 7.5% had someone living alone who was 65 years of age or older. The average household size was 2.98 and the average family size was 3.48.

26.3% of the population were under the age of 18, 11.2% from 18 to 24, 28.0% from 25 to 44, 24.1% from 45 to 64, and 10.4% who were 65 years of age or older. The median age was 33.7 years. For every 100 females, the population had 91.4 males. For every 100 females ages 18 and older there were 88.3 males.

The Census Bureau's 2006–2010 American Community Survey showed that (in 2010 inflation-adjusted dollars) median household income was $58,049 (with a margin of error of +/− $11,220) and the median family income was $65,833 (+/− $15,887). Males had a median income of $36,204 (+/− $9,406) versus $45,211 (+/− $6,778) for females. The per capita income for the borough was $20,317 (+/− $4,090). About 3.3% of families and 6.2% of the population were below the poverty line, including 7.3% of those under age 18 and 2.3% of those age 65 or over.

Same-sex couples headed 20 households in 2010, an increase from the 13 counted in 2000.

=== 2000 census ===
As of the 2000 United States census there were 8,252 people, 2,820 households, and 1,974 families residing in the borough. The population density was 7,111.4 inhabitants per square mile (2,745.7/km^{2}). There were 2,906 housing units at an average density of 2,504.3 per square mile (966.9/km^{2}). The racial makeup of the borough was 73.59% White, 7.09% African American, 0.17% Native American, 4.57% Asian, 0.02% Pacific Islander, 10.09% from other races, and 4.46% from two or more races. Hispanic or Latino of any race were 22.60% of the population.

In the 2000 Census, 2.6% of Haledon's residents identified themselves as being of Arab American ancestry. This was the 11th-highest percentage of Arab American people in any place in the United States with 1,000 or more residents identifying their ancestry.

There were 2,820 households, out of which 35.2% had children under the age of 18 living with them, 50.6% were married couples living together, 15.2% had a female householder with no husband present, and 30.0% were non-families. 23.4% of all households were made up of individuals, and 9.3% had someone living alone who was 65 years of age or older. The average household size was 2.83 and the average family size was 3.41.

In the borough the population was spread out, with 25.5% under the age of 18, 8.9% from 18 to 24, 31.9% from 25 to 44, 19.6% from 45 to 64, and 14.1% who were 65 years of age or older. The median age was 35 years. For every 100 females, there were 89.4 males. For every 100 females age 18 and over, there were 85.4 males.

The median income for a household in the borough was $45,599, and the median income for a family was $49,014. Males had a median income of $37,143 versus $29,830 for females. The per capita income for the borough was $19,099. About 6.2% of families and 10.6% of the population were below the poverty line, including 12.9% of those under age 18 and 20.8% of those age 65 or over.

== Government ==
=== Local government ===
Haledon is governed under the borough form of New Jersey municipal government, which is used in 218 municipalities (of the 564) statewide, making it the most common form of government in New Jersey. The governing body is comprised of the mayor and the borough council, with all positions elected at-large on a partisan basis as part of the November general election. The mayor is elected directly by the voters to a four-year term of office. The borough council includes six members elected to serve three-year terms on a staggered basis, with two seats coming up for election each year in a three-year cycle. The borough form of government used by Haledon is a "weak mayor / strong council" government in which council members act as the legislative body with the mayor presiding at meetings and voting only in the event of a tie. The mayor can veto ordinances subject to an override by a two-thirds majority vote of the council. The mayor makes committee and liaison assignments for council members, and most appointments are made by the mayor with the advice and consent of the council.

As of 2026, the mayor of the Borough of Haledon is Democrat Michael Johnson the first African American to be elected to the office of mayor, whose term of office ends on December 31, 2026, and who first came to office when he defeated 16-year incumbent Domenick Stampone in November 2022. Members of the Haledon Borough Council are Nereyda Curiel (D, 2028), Carlos Aymat (D, 2027), James Iza (D, 2028), Carlos Moczo (2026), Junior A. Morris (D, 2026), Aleksandra Tasic (D, 2027).

In January 2023, the council selected Mounir Almaita, who had just been re-elected to serve a three-year term on council, to fill the position as administrator / clerk for the borough. James Iza was appointed to fill the vacant council seat expiring in December 2025 that had been held by Almaita; Iza will serve on an interim basis until the November 2023 general election, when voters will choose a candidate to serve the balance of the term of office.

In December 2015, the borough council appointed Nereyda Curiel to fill the term expiring in December 2016 that had been held by Maha Kandis until her resignation in October after serving three terms on the council; Curiel served on an interim basis until the November 2016 general election, when she was elected to serve the balance of the term of office.

In the 2014 general election, 22-year-old Tahsina Ahmed was elected to the borough council, making her the first Bangladeshi-American woman elected into office in the United States.

=== Federal, state and county representation ===
Haledon is located in the 9th Congressional District and is part of New Jersey's 35th state legislative district.

For the 119th United States Congress, New Jersey's 9th congressional district is represented by Nellie Pou (D, North Haledon) New Jersey is represented in the United States Senate by Democrats Cory Booker (Newark, term ends 2027) and Andy Kim (Moorestown, term ends 2031).

For the 2026–2027 session, the 35th legislative district of the New Jersey Legislature is represented in the State Senate by Benjie Wimberly (D, Paterson) and in the General Assembly by Al Abdelaziz (D, Paterson) and Kenyatta Stewart (D, Paterson).

Passaic County is governed by a Board of County Commissioners, comprised of seven members who are elected at-large to staggered three-year terms office on a partisan basis, with two or three seats coming up for election each year as part of the November general election in a three-year cycle. At a reorganization meeting held in January, the board selects a Director and Deputy Director from among its members to serve for a one-year term. As of 2026, Passaic County's Commissioners are: Director Cassandra "Sandi" Lazzara (D), Little Falls, term as commissioner ends December 31, 2027; term as director ends 2026), Deputy Director Orlando Cruz (D, Paterson, term as commissioner and as deputy director ends 2026), Rodney DeVore (D, Paterson, 2027), Bruce James (D, Clifton, 2026) Michael Ramaglia (D, West Milford, 2028), Christina Schratz (D, Passaic, 2028) and Nick Veliky (D, Clifton, appointed to a term ending in 2027).

Constitutional officers, elected on a countywide basis, are County Clerk Danielle Ireland-Imhof (D, Hawthorne, 2028), Sheriff Thomas Adamo (D, Wayne, 2027) and Surrogate Zoila S. Cassanova (D, Wayne, 2026).

=== Politics ===
As of March 2011, there were a total of 4,289 registered voters in Haledon, of which 1,763 (41.1% vs. 31.0% countywide) were registered as Democrats, 692 (16.1% vs. 18.7%) were registered as Republicans and 1,834 (42.8% vs. 50.3%) were registered as Unaffiliated. There were no voters registered to other parties. Among the borough's 2010 Census population, 51.6% (vs. 53.2% in Passaic County) were registered to vote, including 70.0% of those ages 18 and over (vs. 70.8% countywide).

Gubernatorial election results for Haledon
Year	Republican		Democratic		Third party(ies)	
Year	No.	%	No.	%	No.	%
2025	677	28.16%	1,698	70.63%	29	1.21%
2021	563	35.12%	1,032	64.38%	8	0.50%
2017	399	26.18%	1,097	71.98%	28	1.84%
2013	684	43.79%	858	54.93%	20	1.28%
2009	598	36.60%	957	58.57%	79	4.83%
2005	570	33.97%	1,020	60.79%	88	5.24%

In the 2012 presidential election, Democrat Barack Obama received 73.7% of the vote (2,142 cast), ahead of Republican Mitt Romney with 25.3% (735 votes), and other candidates with 1.0% (29 votes), among the 2,935 ballots cast by the borough's 4,689 registered voters (29 ballots were spoiled), for a turnout of 62.6%. In the 2008 presidential election, Democrat Barack Obama received 1,973 votes (66.8% vs. 58.8% countywide), ahead of Republican John McCain with 858 votes (29.0% vs. 37.7%) and other candidates with 31 votes (1.0% vs. 0.8%), among the 2,955 ballots cast by the borough's 4,364 registered voters, for a turnout of 67.7% (vs. 70.4% in Passaic County). In the 2004 presidential election, Democrat John Kerry received 1,666 votes (59.0% vs. 53.9% countywide), ahead of Republican George W. Bush with 1,047 votes (37.1% vs. 42.7%) and other candidates with 26 votes (0.9% vs. 0.7%), among the 2,825 ballots cast by the borough's 3,982 registered voters, for a turnout of 70.9% (vs. 69.3% in the whole county).

Presidential elections results
Year	Republican	Democratic	Third Parties
2024	40.6% 1,366	53.5% 1,802	5.9% 194
2020	28.5% 1,107	69.0% 2,667	2.5% 44
2016	24.6% 767	71.7% 2,232	3.0% 93
2012	25.3% 735	73.7% 2,142	1.0% 29
2008	29.0% 858	66.8% 1,973	1.0% 31
2004	37.1% 1,047	59.0% 1,666	0.9% 26

In the 2013 gubernatorial election, Democrat Barbara Buono received 54.9% of the vote (858 cast), ahead of Republican Chris Christie with 43.8% (684 votes), and other candidates with 1.3% (20 votes), among the 1,609 ballots cast by the borough's 4,783 registered voters (47 ballots were spoiled), for a turnout of 33.6%. In the 2009 gubernatorial election, Democrat Jon Corzine received 957 ballots cast (57.9% vs. 50.8% countywide), ahead of Republican Chris Christie with 598 votes (36.2% vs. 43.2%), Independent Chris Daggett with 63 votes (3.8% vs. 3.8%) and other candidates with 16 votes (1.0% vs. 0.9%), among the 1,653 ballots cast by the borough's 4,235 registered voters, yielding a 39.0% turnout (vs. 42.7% in the county).

United States Senate election results for Haledon1
Year	Republican		Democratic		Third party(ies)	
Year	No.	%	No.	%	No.	%
2024	1,117	36.62%	1,728	56.66%	205	6.72%
2018	587	24.98%	1,581	67.28%	182	7.74%
2012	617	23.54%	1,957	74.67%	47	1.79%
2006	669	37.33%	1,096	61.16%	27	1.51%

United States Senate election results for Haledon2
Year	Republican		Democratic		Third party(ies)	
Year	No.	%	No.	%	No.	%
2020	878	23.50%	2,737	73.26%	121	3.24%
2014	401	28.42%	1,000	70.87%	10	0.71%
2013	273	32.54%	547	65.20%	19	2.26%
2008	678	26.64%	1,796	70.57%	71	2.79%

== Education ==
The Haledon School District serves students in pre-kindergarten through eighth grade at Haledon Public School. As of the 2021–22 school year, the district, comprised of one school, had an enrollment of 1,020 students and 96.0 classroom teachers (on an FTE basis), for a student–teacher ratio of 10.6:1.

For ninth through twelfth grades, public school students attend Manchester Regional High School, which serves students from Haledon, North Haledon, and Prospect Park. The school is located in Haledon. The Manchester district participates in the Interdistrict Public School Choice Program, which allows non-resident students to attend the district's schools without cost to their parents, with tuition paid by the state. Available slots are announced annually by grade. As of the 2021–22 school year, the high school had an enrollment of 748 students and 65.5 classroom teachers (on an FTE basis), for a student–teacher ratio of 11.4:1. Seats on the high school district's nine-member board of education are allocated based on the population of the constituent districts, with three seats assigned to Haledon.

== Transportation ==
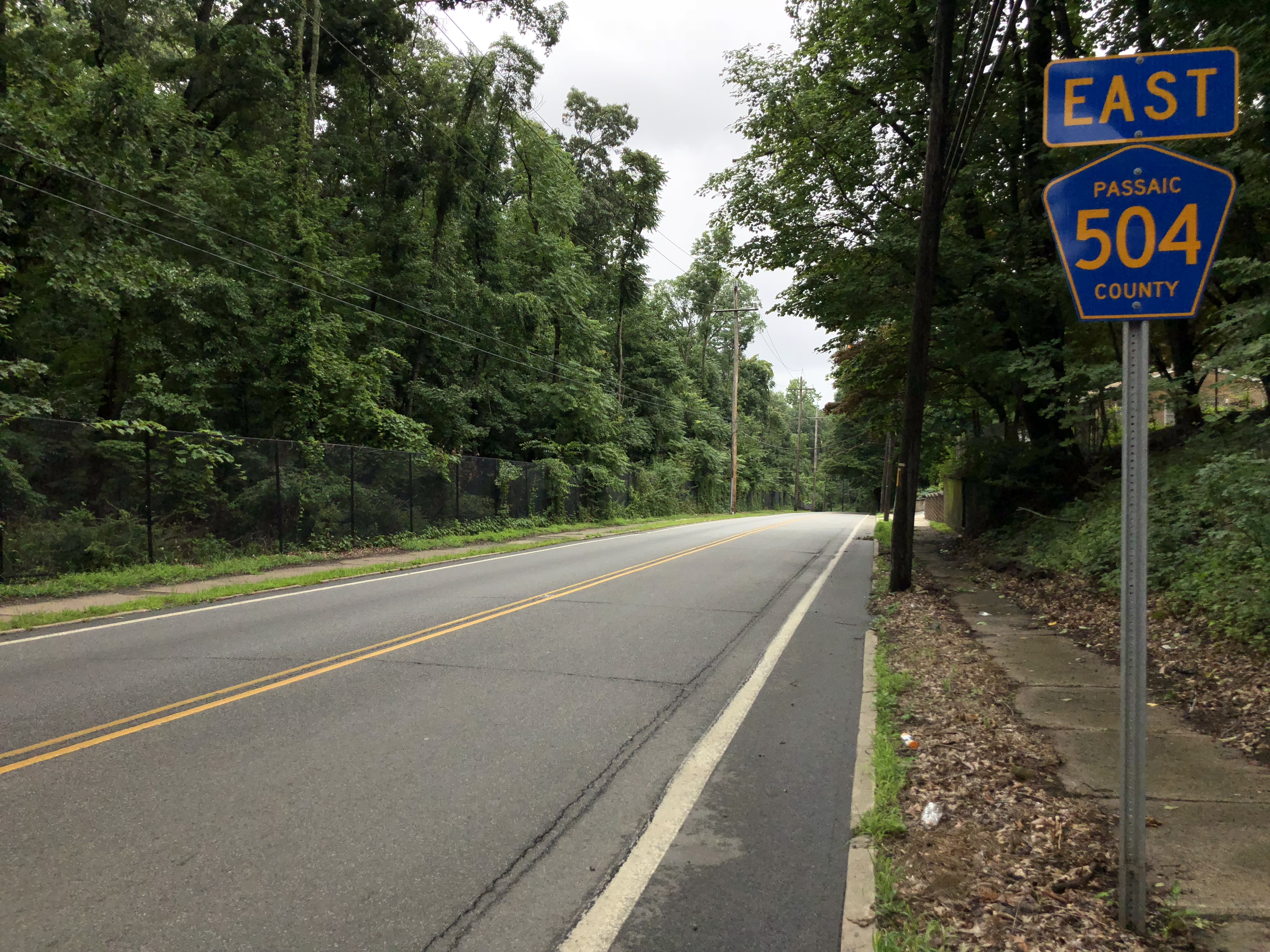
County Route 504 in Haledon

=== Roads and highways ===
As of May 2010, the borough had a total of 17.73 miles (28.53 km) of roadways, of which 11.71 miles (18.85 km) were maintained by the municipality and 6.02 miles (9.69 km) by Passaic County.

The only significant road passing through Haledon is County Route 504, which enters from Wayne, follows Pompton Road and Haledon Avenue eastward through the borough, then exits into Prospect Park and Paterson.

=== Public transportation ===
NJ Transit provides local bus service on the 703, 744 and the 748 routes.

== In popular culture ==
Musical groups from Haledon include the rock band The Feelies.

== Notable people ==
People who were born in, residents of, or otherwise closely associated with Haledon include:

- John C. Barbour (1895–1962), politician who served in the New Jersey General Assembly from 1929 to 1932 and in the New Jersey Senate from 1933 to 1936
- Bruce Baumgartner (born 1960), two-time Olympic gold medalist in freestyle wrestling, three-time World champion, and record holder for most World or Olympic level medals won by an American wrestler with 13
- Bennie Borgmann (1900–1978), early pro basketball player inducted into the Basketball Hall of Fame in 1961
- Jordan Saling (born 1996), footballer who plays as a midfielder for Flower City Union in the National Independent Soccer Association
- Jennie Tuttle Hobart (1849–1941), wife of the former U.S. Vice President Garret Hobart
- Bruce Huther (born 1954), former NFL linebacker who won Super Bowl XII while with the Dallas Cowboys
- Alex Morales (born 1997), college basketball player for the Wagner Seahawks

== Points of interest ==
- The Pietro and Maria Botto House has been listed on the National Register of Historic Places. The house is home of the American Labor Museum, which tells the story of Italian immigration in the area, and of the Paterson Silk Strike of 1913.
- Kossuth Street School, constructed in 1894, was added to the National Register of Historic Places in 1980.
