= Manchester Regional High School =

High schools in Passaic County, New Jersey, US

Passaic County Manchester Regional High School District

Address
- 70 Church Street Haledon, Passaic County, New Jersey, 07508; United States
- Coordinates: 40.941064°N 74.18245°W

District information
- Grades: 9-12
- Superintendent: John Coviello
- Business administrator: Lameka Augustin
- Schools: 1

Students and staff
- Enrollment: 803 (as of 2024–25)
- Faculty: 66.6 FTEs
- Student–teacher ratio: 12.1:1

Other information
- District Factor Group: B
Ind.	Per pupil	District spending	Rank (*)	9–12 average	%± vs. average
1A	Total Spending	$19,935	19	$18,891	5.5%
1	Budgetary Cost	12,434	3	15,592	−20.3%
2	Classroom Instruction	7,817	8	8,807	−11.2%
6	Support Services	1,501	4	2,294	−34.6%
8	Administrative Cost	1,356	6	1,592	−14.8%
10	Operations & Maintenance	1,232	2	1,954	−36.9%
13	Extracurricular Activities	527	5	873	−39.6%
16	Median Teacher Salary	72,828	33	71,726
Data from NJDoE 2014 Taxpayers' Guide to Education Spending. *Of 9–12 districts with any number of students. Lowest spending=1; Highest=47

Passaic County Manchester Regional High School
- United States

Information
- Type: Public
- Established: 1960
- NCES School ID: 341260004856
- Principal: Joseph Ercolani
- Faculty: 66.6 FTEs
- Grades: 9–12
- Enrollment: 803 (as of 2024–25)
- Student to teacher ratio: 12.1:1
- Campus: Suburban
- Colors: Red; Black; White
- Athletics conference: North Jersey Interscholastic Conference
- Team name: Falcons
- Newspaper: The Falcon Flyer
- Website: mrhs.net

Passaic County Manchester Regional High School, most commonly known as Manchester Regional High School, is a comprehensive, four-year public high school and regional school district serving students in ninth through twelfth grades from Haledon, North Haledon and Prospect Park, three communities in Passaic County, in the U.S. state of New Jersey. The high school is the only facility of the Passaic County Manchester Regional High School District.

The district participates in the Interdistrict Public School Choice Program, having been approved in July 2003 to participate in the program, which allows non-resident students to attend school in the district at no cost to their parents, with tuition covered by the resident district. Available slots are announced annually by grade.

As of the 2024–25 school year, the school had an enrollment of 803 students and 66.6 classroom teachers (on an FTE basis), for a student–teacher ratio of 12.1:1. There were 454 students (56.5% of enrollment) eligible for free lunch and 50 (6.2% of students) eligible for reduced-cost lunch.

The school's mean SAT scores for 2012-13 school year were 444 in the mathematics section, 429 in verbal and 419 on the essay for a composite score of 1292 vs. statewide averages of 521 math, 495 verbal and 496 essay, with a composite score of 1512; Among students taking the SAT, 14.2% met the 1550 composite score benchmark indicative of college success and completion, while 8.5% of peer schools and 43.9% of students statewide met this standard.

== History ==
Prior to the establishment of the regional district, students from Haledon had attended Paterson Central High School, while those from North Haledon and Prospect Park were sent to Hawthorne High School. Constructed at a cost of $2.75 million (equivalent to $29.9 million in 2025), the school opened in September 1960 with an initial enrollment of 700 students.

In a 2013 change by the commissioner of the New Jersey Department of Education, the district's funding formula was changed so that costs would be allocated with half based on enrollment and half based on valuation. The formula benefited North Haledon most, with Prospect Park's share of funding for the Manchester having more than doubled in a decade as of the 2014-15 school year and property taxes for the regional district rising nearly $700 on the average home in the previous two years. Haledon and Prospect Park have argued that property valuation should be the basis for assessing district taxes, while North Haledon, with the largest property valuation, had argued that funding should be based exclusively on enrollment.

The district had been classified by the New Jersey Department of Education as being in District Factor Group "B", the second-lowest of eight groups. District Factor Groups organize districts statewide to allow comparison by common socioeconomic characteristics of the local districts. From lowest socioeconomic status to highest, the categories are A, B, CD, DE, FG, GH, I and J.

== Awards, recognition and rankings ==
The school was awarded a Bronze Medal in U.S. News & World Report's 2009-2010 "Best American High Schools" issue, distinguishing it from the pack by being one of only two Passaic County, NJ, high schools mentioned. Only 1,750 high schools out of 21,786 public high schools were recognized.

The school was the 269th-ranked public high school in New Jersey out of 339 schools statewide in New Jersey Monthly magazine's September 2014 cover story on the state's "Top Public High Schools", using a new ranking methodology. The school had been ranked 272nd in the state of 328 schools in 2012, after being ranked 260th in 2010 out of 322 schools listed. The magazine ranked the school 227th in 2008 out of 316 schools. The school was ranked 218th in the magazine's September 2006 issue, which surveyed 316 schools across the state. Schooldigger.com ranked the school as tied for 156th out of 376 public high schools statewide in its 2010 rankings (an increase of 117 positions from the 2009 rank) which were based on the combined percentage of students classified as proficient or above proficient on the language arts literacy and mathematics components of the High School Proficiency Assessment (HSPA).

== Athletics ==
The Manchester Regional Falcons participate in the North Jersey Interscholastic Conference, which is comprised of small-enrollment schools in Bergen, Hudson, Morris and Passaic counties, and was created following a reorganization of sports leagues in Northern New Jersey by the New Jersey State Interscholastic Athletic Association (NJSIAA). With 651 students in grades 10-12, the school was classified by the NJSIAA for the 2019–20 school year as Group II for most athletic competition purposes, which included schools with an enrollment of 486 to 758 students in that grade range. Prior to realignment that took effect in the fall of 2010, Manchester was a member of the smaller Bergen-Passaic Scholastic League (BPSL). The school was classified by the NJSIAA as Group II North for football for 2024–2026, which included schools with 484 to 683 students. Seasonal sports include girls' soccer in the fall to softball in the spring.

== Popular culture ==
MRHS was featured as the school in the independent film 12 and Holding.

== Administration ==
Core members of the district's administration are:

- John Coviello, superintendent
- Lameka Augustin, business administrator and board secretary
- Joseph Ercolani, principal

== Board of education ==
The district's board of education, comprised of nine members, sets policy and oversees the fiscal and educational operation of the district through its administration. As a Type II school district, the board's trustees are elected directly by voters to serve three-year terms of office on a staggered basis, with three seats up for election each year held (since 2013) as part of the November general election. The board appoints a superintendent to oversee the district's day-to-day operations and a business administrator to supervise the business functions of the district. Seats on the board of education are allocated based on the population of the constituent districts, with four seats assigned to Haledon, three to North Haledon and two to Prospect Park; prior to the 2023 board reorganization, North Haledon had four seats and Haledon had three, with the two municipalities switching a seat due to changes in the 2020 census that showed Haledon's population surpassing that of North Haledon.

== Notable alumni ==
- Angela Atwood (1949–1974), founding member of the Symbionese Liberation Army
- Bruce Baumgartner (born 1960), four-time Olympic medal winner in wrestling, two gold, one silver and one bronze
- Bruce Huther (born 1954), former linebacker in the NFL for the Dallas Cowboys, Cleveland Browns and Chicago Bears
- Alex Morales (born 1997), college basketball player for the Wagner Seahawks
