= North Haledon, New Jersey =

Borough in Passaic County, New Jersey, US

- Borough
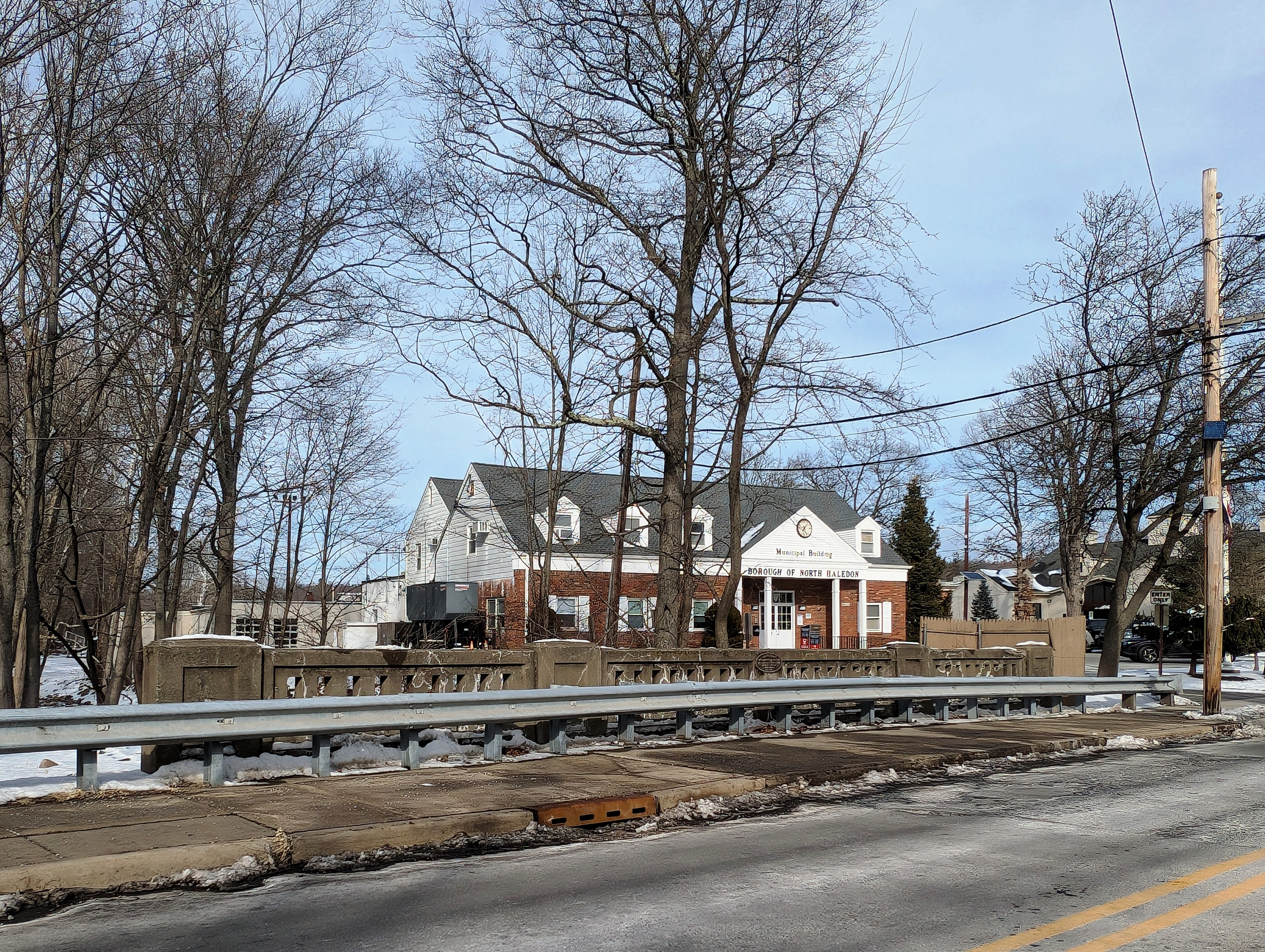
- North Haledon Municipal Building

- Seal

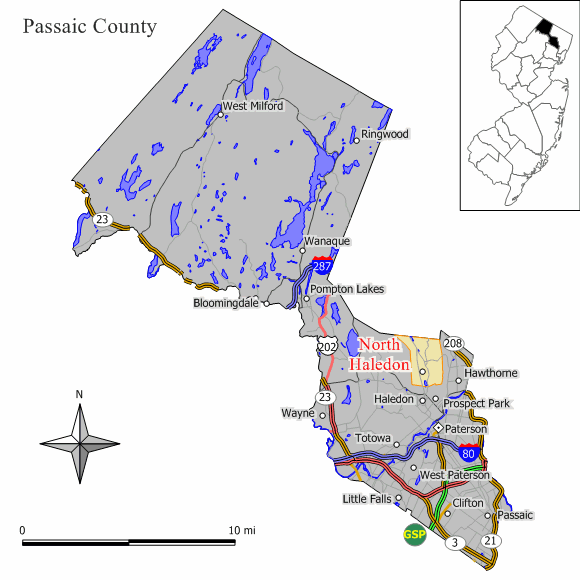
- Map of North Haledon in Passaic County. Inset: Location of Passaic County highlighted in the State of New Jersey.

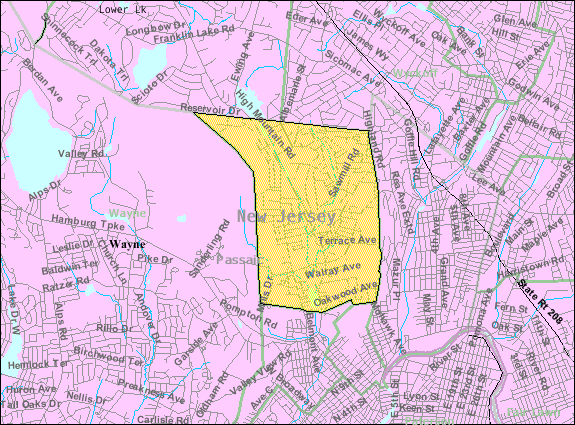
- Census Bureau map of North Haledon, New Jersey

- Location in Passaic County Location in New Jersey Location in the United States
- Coordinates: 40.963618°N 74.185281°W
- Country: United States
- State: New Jersey
- County: Passaic
- Incorporated: March 20, 1901

Government
  - Type: Borough
  - Body: Borough Council
  - Mayor: Randolph J. "Randy" George (R, term ends December 31, 2026)
  - Administrator / Municipal clerk: Renate Elatab

Area
  - Total: 3.53 sq mi (9.14 km^{2})
  - Land: 3.46 sq mi (8.97 km^{2})
  - Water: 0.066 sq mi (0.17 km^{2}) 1.81%
  - Rank: 313th of 565 in state 9th of 16 in county
- Elevation: 302 ft (92 m)

Population (2020)
  - Total: 8,927
  - Estimate (2023): 8,633
  - Rank: 265th of 565 in state 14th of 16 in county
  - Density: 2,577.1/sq mi (995.0/km^{2})
  - Rank: 245th of 565 in state 11th of 16 in county
- Time zone: UTC−05:00 (Eastern (EST))
  - Summer (DST): UTC−04:00 (Eastern (EDT))
- ZIP Codes: 07508, 07538
- Area code: 973
- FIPS code: 3403153040
- GNIS feature ID: 0885325
- Website: northhaledon.com

North Haledon (pronounced North HAIL-don) is a borough in Passaic County, in the U.S. state of New Jersey. As of the 2020 United States census, the borough's population was 8,927, an increase of 510 (+6.1%) from the 2010 census count of 8,417, which in turn reflected an increase of 497 (+6.3%) from the 7,920 counted in the 2000 census.

North Haledon was formed as a borough by an act of the New Jersey Legislature on March 20, 1901, from portions of the now-defunct Manchester Township.

== Geography ==
According to the United States Census Bureau, the borough had a total area of 3.53 square miles (9.14 km^{2}), including 3.46 square miles (8.97 km^{2}) of land and 0.06 square miles (0.17 km^{2}) of water (1.81%).

The borough borders the municipalities of Haledon, Hawthorne, Prospect Park and Wayne in Passaic County; and Franklin Lakes and Wyckoff in Bergen County.

== Demographics ==
Historical population
Census	Pop.	Note	%±
1910	749		—
1920	887		18.4%
1930	2,157		143.2%
1940	2,761		28.0%
1950	3,550		28.6%
1960	6,026		69.7%
1970	7,614		26.4%
1980	8,177		7.4%
1990	7,987		−2.3%
2000	7,920		−0.8%
2010	8,417		6.3%
2020	8,927		6.1%
2023 (est.)	8,633	▼	−3.3%
Population sources: 1910–1920; 1910 1910–1930; 1940–2000 2000; 2010 2020

=== 2020 census ===
As of the 2020 census, North Haledon had a population of 8,927. The median age was 46.4 years. 16.6% of residents were under the age of 18 and 22.7% of residents were 65 years of age or older. For every 100 females there were 93.5 males, and for every 100 females age 18 and over there were 89.8 males age 18 and over.

100.0% of residents lived in urban areas, while 0.0% lived in rural areas.

There were 3,054 households in North Haledon, of which 28.7% had children under the age of 18 living in them. Of all households, 64.3% were married-couple households, 12.1% were households with a male householder and no spouse or partner present, and 20.4% were households with a female householder and no spouse or partner present. About 18.0% of all households were made up of individuals and 9.4% had someone living alone who was 65 years of age or older.

There were 3,141 housing units, of which 2.8% were vacant. The homeowner vacancy rate was 1.0% and the rental vacancy rate was 3.0%.

Racial composition as of the 2020 census
Race	Number	Percent
White	7,114	79.7%
Black or African American	308	3.5%
American Indian and Alaska Native	32	0.4%
Asian	354	4.0%
Native Hawaiian and Other Pacific Islander	1	0.0%
Some other race	416	4.7%
Two or more races	702	7.9%
Hispanic or Latino (of any race)	1,129	12.6%

=== 2010 census ===
The 2010 United States census counted 8,417 people, 3,123 households, and 2,386 families in the borough. The population density was 2,436.8 per square mile (940.9/km^{2}). There were 3,213 housing units at an average density of 930.2 per square mile (359.2/km^{2}). The racial makeup was 91.53% (7,704) White, 1.76% (148) Black or African American, 0.02% (2) Native American, 3.78% (318) Asian, 0.00% (0) Pacific Islander, 1.27% (107) from other races, and 1.64% (138) from two or more races. Hispanic or Latino of any race were 7.46% (628) of the population.

Of the 3,123 households, 27.7% had children under the age of 18; 64.9% were married couples living together; 8.3% had a female householder with no husband present and 23.6% were non-families. Of all households, 20.1% were made up of individuals and 11.8% had someone living alone who was 65 years of age or older. The average household size was 2.67 and the average family size was 3.10.

20.4% of the population were under the age of 18, 6.0% from 18 to 24, 23.6% from 25 to 44, 29.7% from 45 to 64, and 20.3% who were 65 years of age or older. The median age was 45.0 years. For every 100 females, the population had 89.8 males. For every 100 females ages 18 and older there were 87.8 males.

The Census Bureau's 2006–2010 American Community Survey showed that (in 2010 inflation-adjusted dollars) median household income was $103,562 (with a margin of error of +/− $5,006) and the median family income was $107,623 (+/− $8,363). Males had a median income of $71,850 (+/− $10,067) versus $49,038 (+/− $4,709) for females. The per capita income for the borough was $41,694 (+/− $4,002). About 0.7% of families and 2.2% of the population were below the poverty line, including 1.1% of those under age 18 and none of those age 65 or over.

Same-sex couples headed 24 households in 2010, more than double the 10 counted in 2000.

=== 2000 census ===
As of the 2000 United States census there were 7,920 people, 2,626 households, and 2,077 families residing in the borough. The population density was 2,300.6 inhabitants per square mile (888.3/km^{2}). There were 2,675 housing units at an average density of 777.0 per square mile (300.0/km^{2}). The racial makeup of the borough was 95.03% White, 1.44% African American, 0.06% Native American, 1.00% Asian, 0.95% from other races, and 1.53% from two or more races. Hispanic or Latino of any race were 3.89% of the population.

There were 2,626 households, out of which 27.8% had children under the age of 18 living with them, 68.2% were married couples living together, 8.1% had a female householder with no husband present, and 20.9% were non-families. 17.7% of all households were made up of individuals, and 9.6% had someone living alone who was 65 years of age or older. The average household size was 2.79 and the average family size was 3.18.

In the borough the population was spread out, with 19.7% under the age of 18, 10.6% from 18 to 24, 25.9% from 25 to 44, 24.2% from 45 to 64, and 19.6% who were 65 years of age or older. The median age was 40 years. For every 100 females, there were 89.3 males. For every 100 females age 18 and over, there were 87.4 males.

The median income for a household in the borough was $74,700, and the median income for a family was $80,936. Males had a median income of $52,006 versus $34,854 for females. The per capita income for the borough was $30,322. About 2.4% of families and 4.0% of the population were below the poverty line, including 0.3% of those under age 18 and 4.4% of those age 65 or over.

== Government ==
=== Local government ===
North Haledon is governed under the borough form of New Jersey municipal government, which is used in 218 municipalities (of the 564) statewide, making it the most common form of government in New Jersey. The governing body is comprised of the mayor and the borough council, with all positions elected at-large on a partisan basis as part of the November general election. The mayor is elected directly by the voters to a four-year term of office. The borough council includes six members elected to serve three-year terms on a staggered basis, with two seats coming up for election each year in a three-year cycle. The borough form of government used by North Haledon is a "weak mayor / strong council" government in which council members act as the legislative body with the mayor presiding at meetings and voting only in the event of a tie. The mayor can veto ordinances subject to an override by a two-thirds majority vote of the council. The mayor makes committee and liaison assignments for council members, and most appointments are made by the mayor with the advice and consent of the council.

As of 2023, the mayor of North Haledon is Republican Randolph J. "Randy" George, whose term of office ends on December 31, 2026. Members of the North Haledon Borough Council are Council President Bruce O. Iacobelli (R, 2025), Rocco Luisi (R, 2023), Vince Parmese (R, 2025), George Pomianek (R, 2024), Donna Puglisi (R, 2024), and Jacqueline Roscio (R, 2023).

In December 2019, Sandra Salviano was selected from a list of three candidates nominated by the municipal committee to fill the term expiring in December 2022 that had been become vacant following the death earlier that month of her husband, Keith Salviano. Sandra Salviano served on an interim basis until the November 2020 general election, when she was elected to serve the balance of the term of office, though she stepped down from office in February 2021 and was replaced by Vince Parmese, who was elected in November 2021 to serve the remainder of the term.

In 2013, Mayor Randy George was criticized by residents for his use of two borough-owned generators in the persistent electric outages during the days following the devastation of Hurricane Sandy to provide power to the refrigerators in his ice cream store, while Police Chief Robert Bracco had used another municipal-owned generator to provide power at his home. A special committee formed of borough council members found that the actions were justifiable in light of the circumstances and enabled them to serve the borough during the emergency, but recommended that rules be established to govern personal use of borough property by municipal employees and officials.

=== Federal, state, and county representation ===
North Haledon is located in the 9th Congressional District and is part of New Jersey's 35th state legislative district.

Prior to the 2010 Census, North Haledon had been part of the 8th Congressional District, a change made by the New Jersey Redistricting Commission that took effect in January 2013, based on the results of the November 2012 general elections.

For the 119th United States Congress, New Jersey's 9th congressional district is represented by Nellie Pou (D, North Haledon) New Jersey is represented in the United States Senate by Democrats Cory Booker (Newark, term ends 2027) and Andy Kim (Moorestown, term ends 2031).

For the 2026–2027 session, the 35th legislative district of the New Jersey Legislature is represented in the State Senate by Benjie Wimberly (D, Paterson) and in the General Assembly by Al Abdelaziz (D, Paterson) and Kenyatta Stewart (D, Paterson).

Passaic County is governed by a Board of County Commissioners, comprised of seven members who are elected at-large to staggered three-year terms office on a partisan basis, with two or three seats coming up for election each year as part of the November general election in a three-year cycle. At a reorganization meeting held in January, the board selects a Director and Deputy Director from among its members to serve for a one-year term. As of 2026, Passaic County's Commissioners are: Director Cassandra "Sandi" Lazzara (D), Little Falls, term as commissioner ends December 31, 2027; term as director ends 2026), Deputy Director Orlando Cruz (D, Paterson, term as commissioner and as deputy director ends 2026), Rodney DeVore (D, Paterson, 2027), Bruce James (D, Clifton, 2026) Michael Ramaglia (D, West Milford, 2028), Christina Schratz (D, Passaic, 2028) and Nick Veliky (D, Clifton, appointed to a term ending in 2027).

Constitutional officers, elected on a countywide basis, are County Clerk Danielle Ireland-Imhof (D, Hawthorne, 2028), Sheriff Thomas Adamo (D, Wayne, 2027) and Surrogate Zoila S. Cassanova (D, Wayne, 2026).

=== Politics ===
As of March 2011, there were a total of 6,156 registered voters in North Haledon, of which 1,180 (19.2% vs. 31.0% countywide) were registered as Democrats, 2,051 (33.3% vs. 18.7%) were registered as Republicans and 2,923 (47.5% vs. 50.3%) were registered as Unaffiliated. There were 2 voters registered to other parties. Among the borough's 2010 Census population, 73.1% (vs. 53.2% in Passaic County) were registered to vote, including 91.9% of those ages 18 and over (vs. 70.8% countywide).

Gubernatorial election results for North Haledon
Year	Republican		Democratic		Third party(ies)	
Year	No.	%	No.	%	No.	%
2025	2,663	61.80%	1,628	37.78%	18	0.42%
2021	2,416	69.03%	1,067	30.49%	17	0.49%
2017	1,672	61.43%	993	36.48%	57	2.09%
2013	2,304	72.98%	831	26.32%	22	0.70%
2009	2,169	67.40%	932	28.96%	117	3.64%
2005	1,725	61.00%	1,043	36.88%	60	2.12%

In the 2012 presidential election, Republican Mitt Romney received 64.1% of the vote (2,916 cast), ahead of Democrat Barack Obama with 35.0% (1,593 votes), and other candidates with 0.9% (40 votes), among the 4,584 ballots cast by the borough's 6,364 registered voters (35 ballots were spoiled), for a turnout of 72.0%. In the 2008 presidential election, Republican John McCain received 3,016 votes (62.0% vs. 37.7% countywide), ahead of Democrat Barack Obama with 1,678 votes (34.5% vs. 58.8%) and other candidates with 46 votes (0.9% vs. 0.8%), among the 4,864 ballots cast by the borough's 6,241 registered voters, for a turnout of 77.9% (vs. 70.4% in Passaic County). In the 2004 presidential election, Republican George W. Bush received 2,951 votes (62.9% vs. 42.7% countywide), ahead of Democrat John Kerry with 1,567 votes (33.4% vs. 53.9%) and other candidates with 32 votes (0.7% vs. 0.7%), among the 4,692 ballots cast by the borough's 5,831 registered voters, for a turnout of 80.5% (vs. 69.3% in the whole county).

Presidential elections results
Year	Republican	Democratic	Third Parties
2024	63.0% 3,370	33.8% 1,810	3.2% 149
2020	61.0% 3,470	36.7% 2,087	3.3% 75
2016	63.6% 3,058	33.1% 1,592	2.6% 123
2012	64.1% 2,916	35.0% 1,593	0.9% 40
2008	62.0% 3,016	34.5% 1,678	0.9% 46
2004	62.9% 2,951	33.4% 1,567	0.7% 32

In the 2013 gubernatorial election, Republican Chris Christie received 73.0% of the vote (2,304 cast), ahead of Democrat Barbara Buono with 26.3% (831 votes), and other candidates with 0.7% (22 votes), among the 3,230 ballots cast by the borough's 6,439 registered voters (73 ballots were spoiled), for a turnout of 50.2%. In the 2009 gubernatorial election, Republican Chris Christie received 2,169 votes (67.2% vs. 43.2% countywide), ahead of Democrat Jon Corzine with 932 votes (28.9% vs. 50.8%), Independent Chris Daggett with 79 votes (2.4% vs. 3.8%) and other candidates with 20 votes (0.6% vs. 0.9%), among the 3,226 ballots cast by the borough's 6,117 registered voters, yielding a 52.7% turnout (vs. 42.7% in the county).

United States Senate election results for North Haledon1
Year	Republican		Democratic		Third party(ies)	
Year	No.	%	No.	%	No.	%
2024	3,135	62.49%	1,740	34.68%	142	2.83%
2018	2,613	62.81%	1,289	30.99%	258	6.20%
2012	2,592	62.79%	1,463	35.44%	73	1.77%
2006	1,901	65.35%	975	33.52%	33	1.13%

United States Senate election results for North Haledon2
Year	Republican		Democratic		Third party(ies)	
Year	No.	%	No.	%	No.	%
2020	3,350	60.69%	2,044	37.03%	126	2.28%
2014	1,935	60.72%	1,216	38.16%	36	1.13%
2013	1,298	67.11%	624	32.26%	12	0.62%
2008	2,607	59.77%	1,689	38.72%	66	1.51%

== Education ==
The North Haledon School District serves students in public school for pre-kindergarten through eighth grade. As of the 2023–24 school year, the district, comprised of two schools, had an enrollment of 617 students and 59.3 classroom teachers (on an FTE basis), for a student–teacher ratio of 10.4:1. Schools in the district (with 2023–24 enrollment data from the National Center for Education Statistics) are Memorial School with 353 students in grades PreK–4 and High Mountain School with 260 students in grades 5–8.

For ninth through twelfth grades, public school students attend Manchester Regional High School, which serves students from Haledon, North Haledon, and Prospect Park. The school is located in Haledon. North Haledon residents had successfully voted in 2003 to leave the district, choosing to send their high school aged students to Midland Park High School in nearby Bergen County, New Jersey. In August 2004, the New Jersey Supreme Court decided against North Haledon, citing that the town's exit from the district would shift the ethnic and racial balance of the high school. As of the 2023–24 school year, the high school had an enrollment of 819 students and 60.0 classroom teachers (on an FTE basis), for a student–teacher ratio of 13.7:1. Seats on the high school district's nine-member board of education are allocated based on the population of the constituent districts, with four seats assigned to North Haledon.

Founded in 1892, Eastern Christian High School serves over 700 students in four separate school facilities covering preschool through 12th grade.

== Transportation ==
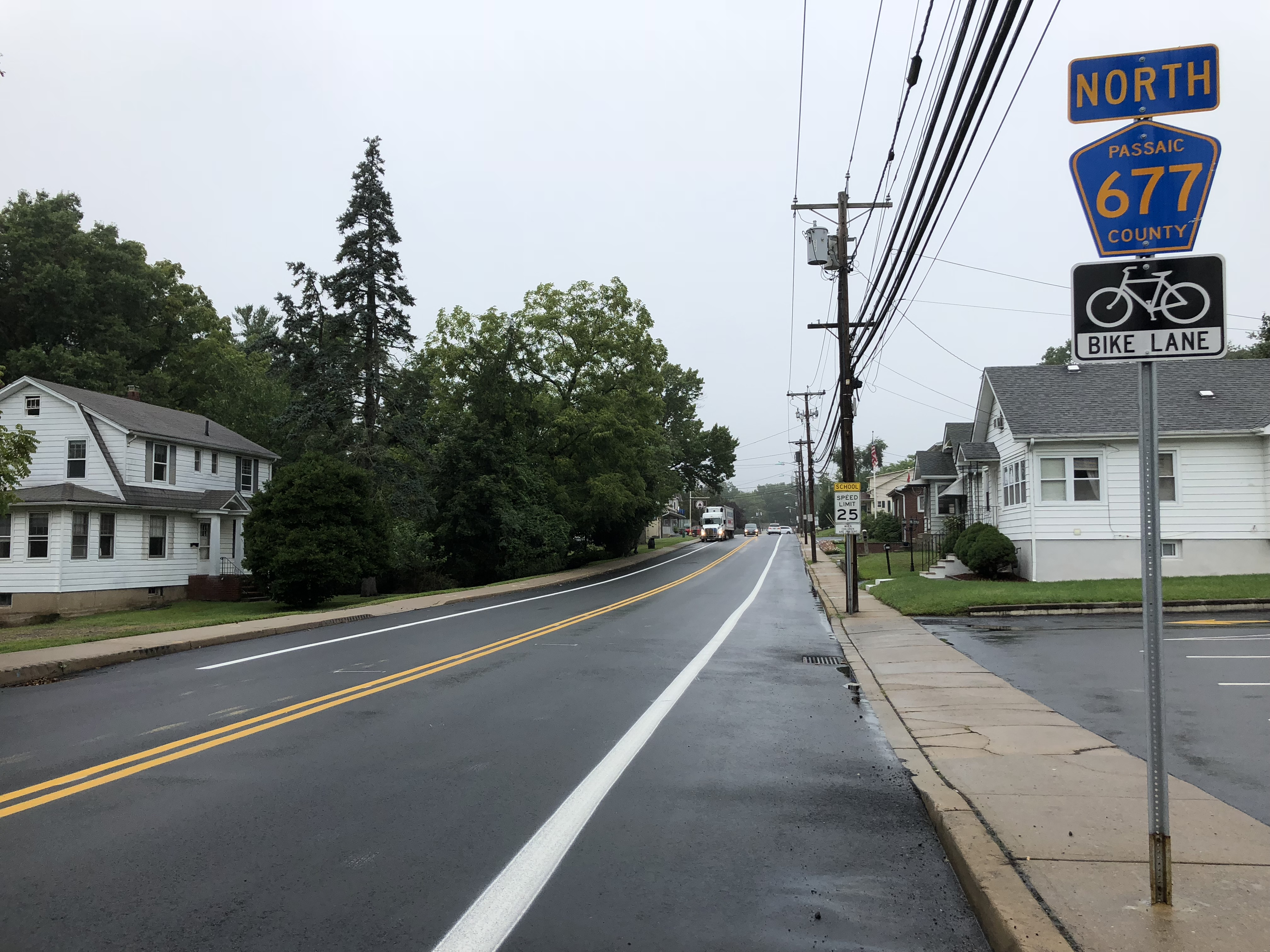
County Route 677 (High Mountain Road) in North Haledon

=== Roads and highways ===
As of May 2010, the borough had a total of 36.97 miles (59.50 km) of roadways, of which 30.16 miles (48.54 km) were maintained by the municipality and 6.81 miles (10.96 km) by Passaic County

No Interstate, U.S. or state highways directly serve North Haledon. The most prominent roads within the borough are minor county routes, such as County Route 677 (High Mountain Road).

=== Public transportation ===
NJ Transit provides local service on the 703 route.

== Notable people ==
People who were born in, residents of, or otherwise closely associated with North Haledon include:

- Angela Atwood (1949–1974), founding member of the revolutionary group, the Symbionese Liberation Army
- Jayden Bellamy (born 2003), cornerback for the UCF Knights football team
- Gérard Debaets (1899–1959), Belgian racing cyclist
- John A. Ferraro (1946–2010), actor, academic, stage director and television director
- Joseph J. Helble, academic who has been President of Lehigh University since 2021
- Glenn Mercer, vocalist and guitarist of the rock band The Feelies
- Nellie Pou (born 1956), politician who represents New Jersey's 9th congressional district in the U.S. House of Representatives; formerly represented the 35th Legislative District in the New Jersey Senate and New Jersey General Assembly
