= Prospect Park, New Jersey =

Borough in Passaic County, New Jersey, US

- Borough
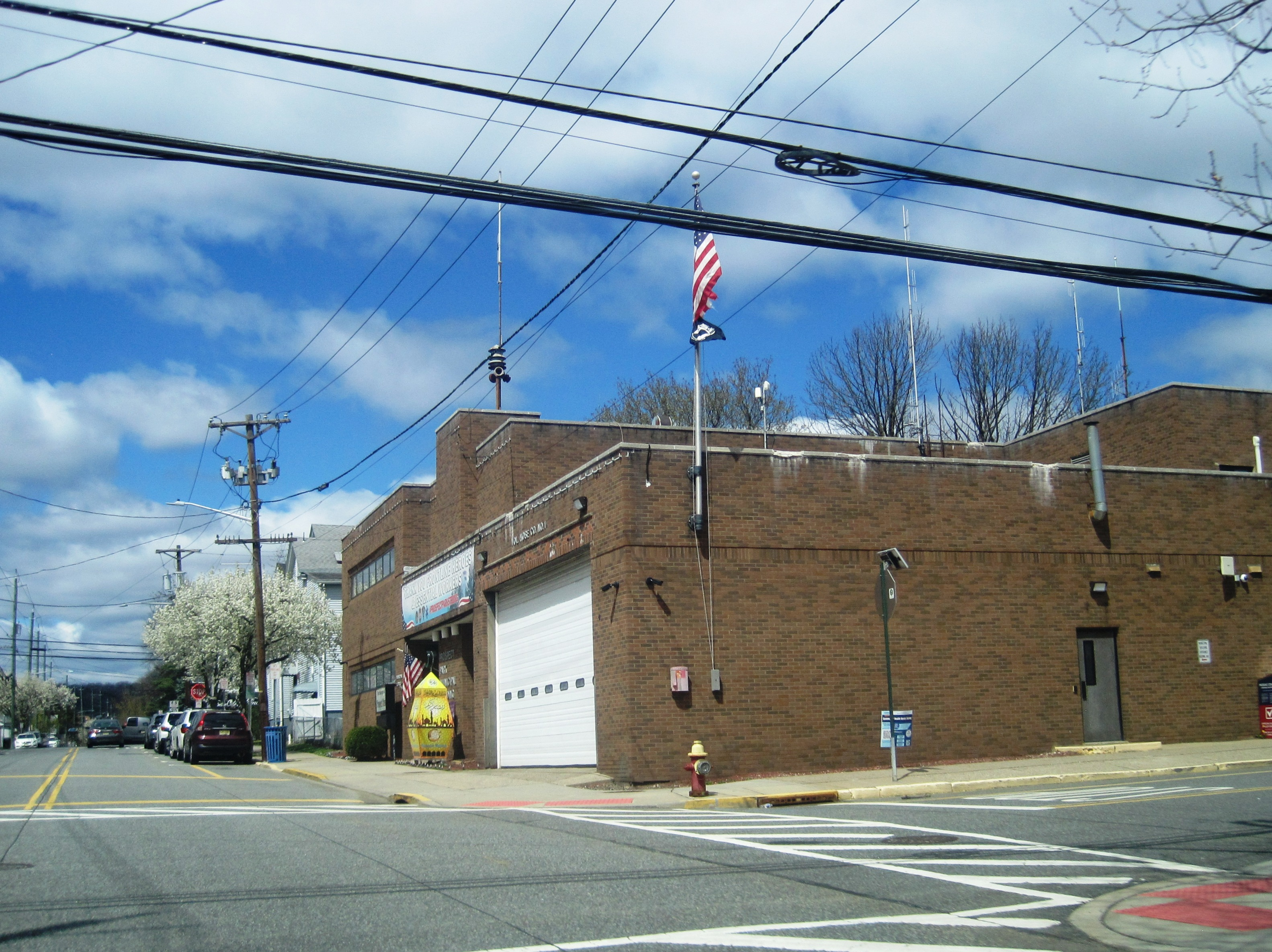
- Municipal building and fire station

- Seal

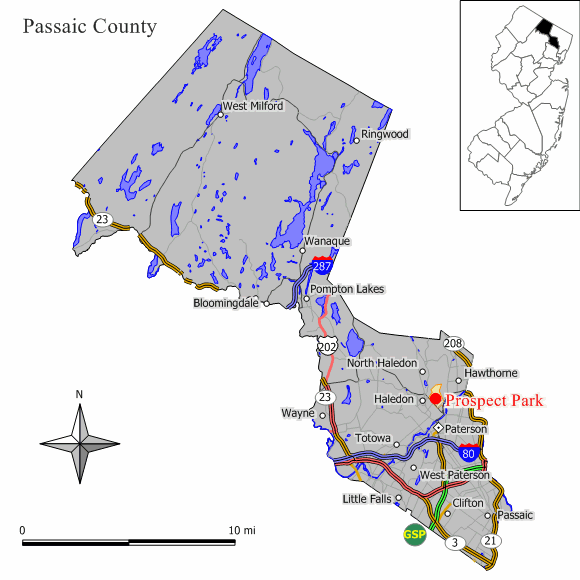
- Map of Prospect Park in Passaic County. Inset: Location of Passaic County highlighted in the State of New Jersey.

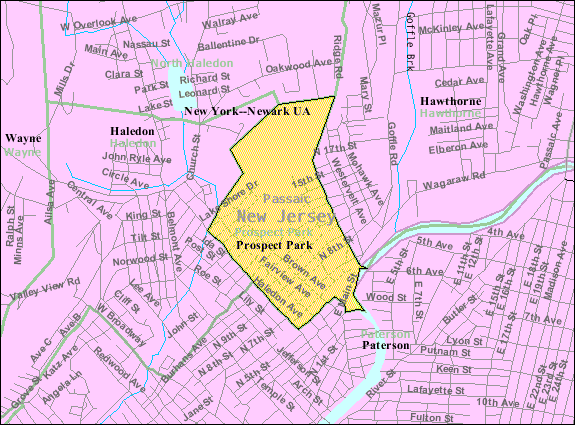
- Census Bureau map of Prospect Park, New Jersey

- Location in Passaic County Location in New Jersey Location in the United States
- Coordinates: 40.941559°N 74.174088°W
- Country: United States
- State: New Jersey
- County: Passaic
- Incorporated: March 13, 1901
- Named for: Prospect Park, Brooklyn

Government
  - Type: Borough
  - Body: Borough Council
  - Mayor: Mohamed T. Khairullah (D, term ends December 31, 2026)
  - Administrator / Municipal clerk: Intashan Chowdhury
  - Municipal clerk: Fahim Abedrabbo

Area
  - Total: 0.47 sq mi (1.22 km^{2})
  - Land: 0.46 sq mi (1.20 km^{2})
  - Water: 0.0039 sq mi (0.01 km^{2}) 1.06%
  - Rank: 548th of 565 in state 16th of 16 in county
- Elevation: 236 ft (72 m)

Population (2020)
  - Total: 6,372
  - Estimate (2023): 6,219
  - Rank: 331st of 565 in state 16th of 16 in county
  - Density: 13,703.2/sq mi (5,290.8/km^{2})
  - Rank: 20th of 565 in state 3rd of 16 in county
- Time zone: UTC−05:00 (Eastern (EST))
  - Summer (DST): UTC−04:00 (Eastern (EDT))
- ZIP Codes: 07508, 07538
- Area code: 973
- FIPS code: 3403161170
- GNIS feature ID: 0885362
- Website: www.prospectpark.net

Prospect Park is a borough in Passaic County, in the U.S. state of New Jersey. As of the 2020 United States census, the borough's population was 6,372, an increase of 507 (+8.6%) from the 2010 census count of 5,865, which in turn reflected an increase of 86 (+1.5%) from the 5,779 counted in the 2000 census.

The borough of Prospect Park was formed by an act of the New Jersey Legislature on March 13, 1901, from portions of the now-defunct Manchester Township. The borough was named for Prospect Park, Brooklyn.

It is a dry town, where alcohol cannot be sold, as affirmed by an ordinance passed in 1978.

== Geography ==
According to the United States Census Bureau, the borough had a total area of 0.47 square miles (1.22 km^{2}), including 0.47 square miles (1.20 km^{2}) of land and 0.01 square miles (0.01 km^{2}) of water (1.06%).

The borough borders the Passaic County municipalities of Haledon, Hawthorne, North Haledon and Paterson.

== Demographics ==
Historical population
Census	Pop.	Note	%±
1910	2,719		—
1920	4,292		57.9%
1930	5,909		37.7%
1940	5,714		−3.3%
1950	5,242		−8.3%
1960	5,201		−0.8%
1970	5,176		−0.5%
1980	5,142		−0.7%
1990	5,053		−1.7%
2000	5,779		14.4%
2010	5,865		1.5%
2020	6,372		8.6%
2023 (est.)	6,219	▼	−2.4%
Population sources: 1910–1920; 1910 1910–1930; 1940–2000 2000; 2010 2020

=== 2020 census ===
As of the 2020 census, Prospect Park had a population of 6,372. The median age was 33.7 years. 26.4% of residents were under the age of 18 and 10.4% of residents were 65 years of age or older. For every 100 females there were 92.9 males, and for every 100 females age 18 and over there were 88.4 males age 18 and over.

100.0% of residents lived in urban areas, while 0.0% lived in rural areas.

There were 1,932 households in Prospect Park, of which 48.5% had children under the age of 18 living in them. Of all households, 41.0% were married-couple households, 16.0% were households with a male householder and no spouse or partner present, and 35.6% were households with a female householder and no spouse or partner present. About 16.8% of all households were made up of individuals and 5.1% had someone living alone who was 65 years of age or older.

There were 2,017 housing units, of which 4.2% were vacant. The homeowner vacancy rate was 1.8% and the rental vacancy rate was 3.0%.

Racial composition as of the 2020 census
Race	Number	Percent
White	1,624	25.5%
Black or African American	1,120	17.6%
American Indian and Alaska Native	48	0.8%
Asian	304	4.8%
Native Hawaiian and Other Pacific Islander	0	0.0%
Some other race	2,199	34.5%
Two or more races	1,077	16.9%
Hispanic or Latino (of any race)	3,752	58.9%

=== 2010 census ===
The 2010 United States census counted 5,865 people, 1,797 households, and 1,456 families in the borough. The population density was 12,347.2 per square mile (4,767.3/km^{2}). There were 1,931 housing units at an average density of 4,065.2 per square mile (1,569.6/km^{2}). The racial makeup was 51.07% (2,995) White, 19.86% (1,165) Black or African American, 1.50% (88) Native American, 3.21% (188) Asian, 0.10% (6) Pacific Islander, 18.21% (1,068) from other races, and 6.05% (355) from two or more races. Hispanic or Latino of any race were 52.09% (3,055) of the population.

Of the 1,797 households, 43.6% had children under the age of 18; 47.6% were married couples living together; 26.4% had a female householder with no husband present and 19.0% were non-families. Of all households, 14.7% were made up of individuals and 4.7% had someone living alone who was 65 years of age or older. The average household size was 3.26 and the average family size was 3.59.

28.4% of the population were under the age of 18, 10.9% from 18 to 24, 29.9% from 25 to 44, 22.6% from 45 to 64, and 8.2% who were 65 years of age or older. The median age was 31.7 years. For every 100 females, the population had 90.6 males. For every 100 females ages 18 and older there were 86.7 males.

The Census Bureau's 2006–2010 American Community Survey showed that (in 2010 inflation-adjusted dollars) median household income was $63,194 (with a margin of error of +/− $9,308) and the median family income was $65,625 (+/− $6,456). Males had a median income of $43,109 (+/− $6,443) versus $30,142 (+/− $9,427) for females. The per capita income for the borough was $20,993 (+/− $2,145). About 12.0% of families and 11.4% of the population were below the poverty line, including 20.4% of those under age 18 and 20.0% of those age 65 or over.

Same-sex couples headed 8 households in 2010, a decline from the 11 counted in 2000.

=== 2000 census ===
As of the 2000 United States census there were 5,779 people, 1,822 households, and 1,432 families residing in the borough. The population density was 12,043.7 inhabitants per square mile (4,650.1/km^{2}). There were 1,889 housing units at an average density of 3,936.8 per square mile (1,520.0/km^{2}). The racial makeup of the borough was 61.17% White, 13.65% African American, 0.42% Native American, 3.15% Asian, 0.07% Pacific Islander, 13.70% from other races, and 7.84% from two or more races. Hispanic or Latino of any race were 38.26% of the population.

There were 1,822 households, out of which 44.7% had children under the age of 18 living with them, 52.7% were married couples living together, 20.0% had a female householder with no husband present, and 21.4% were non-families. 17.0% of all households were made up of individuals, and 6.6% had someone living alone who was 65 years of age or older. The average household size was 3.17 and the average family size was 3.56.

In the borough the population was spread out, with 29.6% under the age of 18, 10.3% from 18 to 24, 32.8% from 25 to 44, 18.5% from 45 to 64, and 8.8% who were 65 years of age or older. The median age was 31 years. For every 100 females, there were 90.8 males. For every 100 females age 18 and over, there were 84.7 males.

The median income for a household in the borough was $46,434, and the median income for a family was $49,405. Males had a median income of $31,951 versus $26,569 for females. The per capita income for the borough was $16,410. About 7.9% of families and 10.0% of the population were below the poverty line, including 14.4% of those under age 18 and 6.2% of those age 65 or over.

As part of the 2000 Census, 1.7% of Prospect Park's residents identified themselves as being of Albanian ancestry. This was the 11th-highest percentage of Albanian American people in any place in the United States with 1,000 or more residents identifying their ancestry. In the same census, 3.2% of Prospect Park's residents identified themselves as being of Arab American ancestry. This was the sixth-highest percentage of Arab American people in any place in the United States with 1,000 or more residents identifying their ancestry.

== Government ==
=== Local government ===
Prospect Park is governed under the borough form of New Jersey municipal government, which is used in 218 municipalities (of the 564) statewide, making it the most common form of government in New Jersey. The governing body is comprised of the mayor and the borough council, with all positions elected at-large on a partisan basis as part of the November general election. The mayor is elected directly by the voters to a four-year term of office. The borough council includes six members elected to serve three-year terms on a staggered basis, with two seats coming up for election each year in a three-year cycle. The borough form of government used by Prospect Park is a "weak mayor / strong council" government in which council members act as the legislative body with the mayor presiding at meetings and voting only in the event of a tie. The mayor can veto ordinances subject to an override by a two-thirds majority vote of the council. The mayor makes committee and liaison assignments for council members, and most appointments are made by the mayor with the advice and consent of the council.

As of 2023, the mayor of Prospect Park is Democrat Mohamed Khairullah, whose term of office ends December 31, 2026. Khairullah was appointed to the office in 2005, after his predecessor Will Kubofcik vacated his seat to move out of the borough; he has since been elected to four full terms. Members of the Borough Council are Council President Mohammed A. Hussain (D, 2025), Robert Artis (D, 2023), Alaa Matari (D, 2024), Felicia Ortiz (D, 2023), Esther Perez (D, 2024) and Anand Shah (D, 2025).

Samir Hayek resigned from office in July 2017, citing personal reason for leaving the seat expiring in December 2018.

In September 2016, Esther Perez, who had previously served 12 years on the borough council, was selected to fill the seat expiring in December 2018 that had been held by Richard Esquiche until he resigned from office the previous month. Perez was elected in November 2016 to serve the balance of the term of office.

=== Federal, state and county representation ===
Prospect Park is located in the 9th Congressional District and is part of New Jersey's 35th state legislative district. Prior to the 2010 Census, Prospect Park had been part of the 8th Congressional District, a change made by the New Jersey Redistricting Commission that took effect in January 2013, based on the results of the November 2012 general elections.

For the 119th United States Congress, New Jersey's 9th congressional district is represented by Nellie Pou (D, North Haledon) New Jersey is represented in the United States Senate by Democrats Cory Booker (Newark, term ends 2027) and Andy Kim (Moorestown, term ends 2031).

For the 2026–2027 session, the 35th legislative district of the New Jersey Legislature is represented in the State Senate by Benjie Wimberly (D, Paterson) and in the General Assembly by Al Abdelaziz (D, Paterson) and Kenyatta Stewart (D, Paterson).

Passaic County is governed by a Board of County Commissioners, comprised of seven members who are elected at-large to staggered three-year terms office on a partisan basis, with two or three seats coming up for election each year as part of the November general election in a three-year cycle. At a reorganization meeting held in January, the board selects a Director and Deputy Director from among its members to serve for a one-year term. As of 2026, Passaic County's Commissioners are: Director Cassandra "Sandi" Lazzara (D), Little Falls, term as commissioner ends December 31, 2027; term as director ends 2026), Deputy Director Orlando Cruz (D, Paterson, term as commissioner and as deputy director ends 2026), Rodney DeVore (D, Paterson, 2027), Bruce James (D, Clifton, 2026) Michael Ramaglia (D, West Milford, 2028), Christina Schratz (D, Passaic, 2028) and Nick Veliky (D, Clifton, appointed to a term ending in 2027).

Constitutional officers, elected on a countywide basis, are County Clerk Danielle Ireland-Imhof (D, Hawthorne, 2028), Sheriff Thomas Adamo (D, Wayne, 2027) and Surrogate Zoila S. Cassanova (D, Wayne, 2026).

=== Politics ===
As of March 2011, there were a total of 3,139 registered voters in Prospect Park, of which 1,710 (54.5% vs. 31.0% countywide) were registered as Democrats, 345 (11.0% vs. 18.7%) were registered as Republicans and 1,084 (34.5% vs. 50.3%) were registered as Unaffiliated. There were no voters registered to other parties. Among the borough's 2010 Census population, 53.5% (vs. 53.2% in Passaic County) were registered to vote, including 74.8% of those ages 18 and over (vs. 70.8% countywide).

Gubernatorial election results for Prospect Park
Year	Republican		Democratic		Third party(ies)	
Year	No.	%	No.	%	No.	%
2025	318	21.24%	1,159	77.42%	20	1.34%
2021	288	28.63%	698	69.38%	20	1.99%
2017	194	18.28%	851	80.21%	16	1.51%
2013	398	35.95%	690	62.33%	19	1.72%
2009	310	28.31%	743	67.85%	42	3.84%
2005	345	27.25%	866	68.40%	55	4.34%

In the 2012 presidential election, Democrat Barack Obama received 82.9% of the vote (1,744 cast), ahead of Republican Mitt Romney with 16.5% (348 votes), and other candidates with 0.6% (12 votes), among the 2,130 ballots cast by the borough's 3,402 registered voters (26 ballots were spoiled), for a turnout of 62.6%. In the 2008 presidential election, Democrat Barack Obama received 1,721 votes (75.9% vs. 58.8% countywide), ahead of Republican John McCain with 474 votes (20.9% vs. 37.7%) and other candidates with 15 votes (0.7% vs. 0.8%), among the 2,267 ballots cast by the borough's 3,387 registered voters, for a turnout of 66.9% (vs. 70.4% in Passaic County). In the 2004 presidential election, Democrat John Kerry received 1,325 votes (64.8% vs. 53.9% countywide), ahead of Republican George W. Bush with 655 votes (32.0% vs. 42.7%) and other candidates with 22 votes (1.1% vs. 0.7%), among the 2,046 ballots cast by the borough's 3,270 registered voters, for a turnout of 62.6% (vs. 69.3% in the whole county).

Presidential elections results
Year	Republican	Democratic	Third Parties
2024	39.7% 882	55.2% 1,227	5.1% 103
2020	25.1% 649	71.9% 1,859	3.0% 23
2016	18.0% 399	77.7% 1,722	3.4% 76
2012	16.5% 348	82.9% 1,744	0.6% 12
2008	20.9% 474	75.9% 1,721	0.7% 15
2004	32.0% 655	64.8% 1,325	1.1% 22

In the 2013 gubernatorial election, Democrat Barbara Buono received 62.3% of the vote (690 cast), ahead of Republican Chris Christie with 36.0% (398 votes), and other candidates with 1.7% (19 votes), among the 1,143 ballots cast by the borough's 3,502 registered voters (36 ballots were spoiled), for a turnout of 32.6%. In the 2009 gubernatorial election, Democrat Jon Corzine received 743 ballots cast (66.1% vs. 50.8% countywide), ahead of Republican Chris Christie with 310 votes (27.6% vs. 43.2%), Independent Chris Daggett with 33 votes (2.9% vs. 3.8%) and other candidates with 9 votes (0.8% vs. 0.9%), among the 1,124 ballots cast by the borough's 3,116 registered voters, yielding a 36.1% turnout (vs. 42.7% in the county).

United States Senate election results for Prospect Park1
Year	Republican		Democratic		Third party(ies)	
Year	No.	%	No.	%	No.	%
2024	689	34.35%	1,209	60.27%	108	5.38%
2018	308	16.42%	1,414	75.37%	154	8.21%
2012	300	15.64%	1,602	83.52%	16	0.83%
2006	379	29.61%	891	69.61%	10	0.78%

United States Senate election results for Prospect Park2
Year	Republican		Democratic		Third party(ies)	
Year	No.	%	No.	%	No.	%
2020	490	19.70%	1,923	77.32%	74	2.98%
2014	202	18.20%	868	78.20%	40	3.60%
2013	138	22.01%	482	76.87%	7	1.12%
2008	403	20.55%	1,509	76.95%	49	2.50%

== Education ==
The Prospect Park School District serves public school students in pre-kindergarten through eighth grade. As of the 2023–24 school year, the district, comprised of two schools, had an enrollment of 834 students and 80.7 classroom teachers (on an FTE basis), for a student–teacher ratio of 10.3:1. Schools in the district (with 2023–24 enrollment data from the National Center for Education Statistics) are Prospect Park School Number 1, with 652 students in grades PreK–6 and Prospect Park School Number Two / Middle School, with 162 students in grades 7–8.

For ninth through twelfth grades, public school students attend Manchester Regional High School, which also serves students from Haledon and North Haledon. As of the 2023–24 school year, the high school had an enrollment of 819 students and 60.0 classroom teachers (on an FTE basis), for a student–teacher ratio of 13.7:1. Seats on the high school district's nine-member board of education are allocated based on the population of the constituent districts, with two seats assigned to Prospect Park.

Students are also eligible to attend the Passaic County Technical Institute, a countywide program located in Wayne.

== Transportation ==
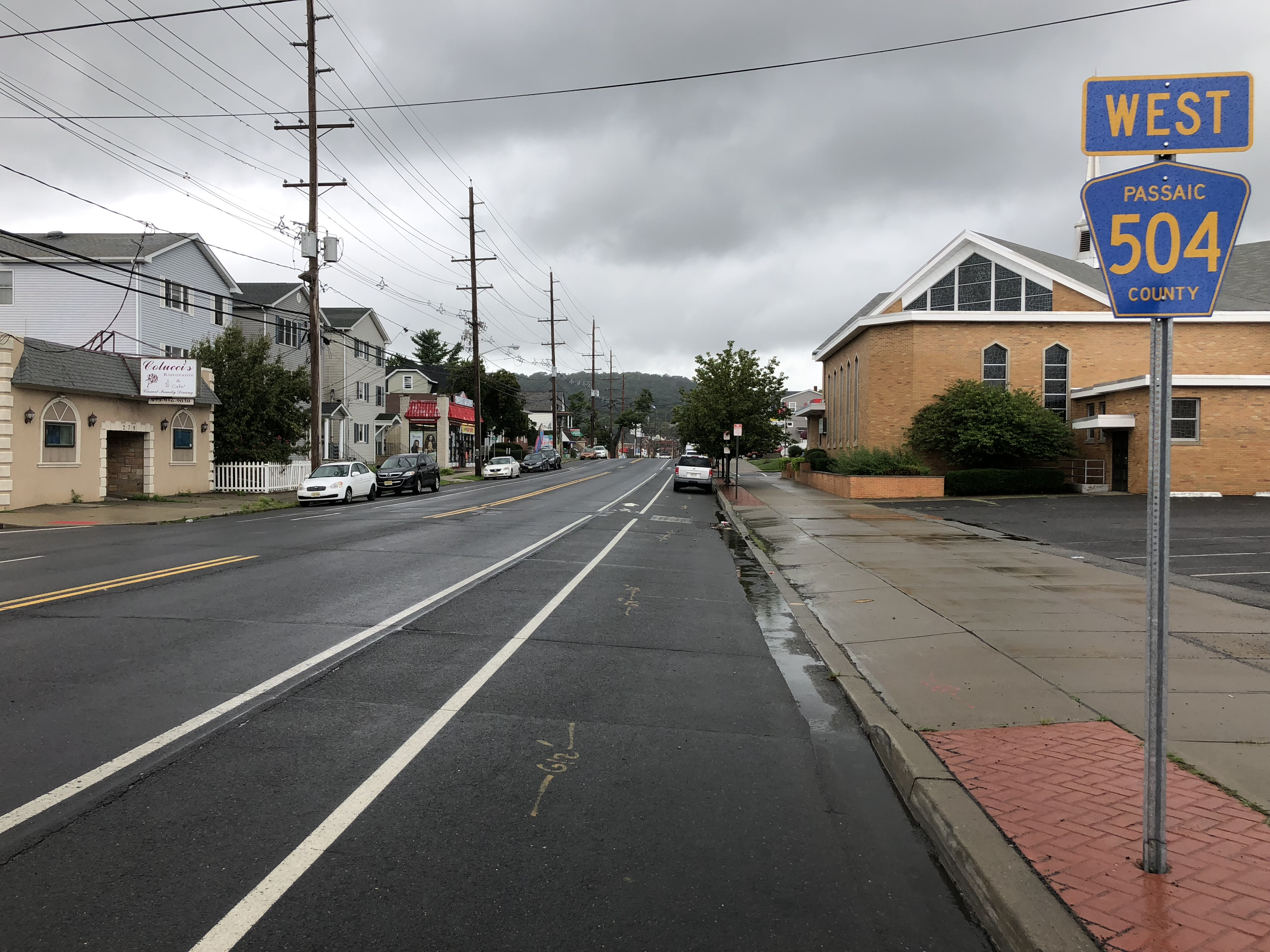
County Route 504 following Haledon Avenue on the southwest edge of Prospect Park

=== Roads and highways ===
As of May 2010, the borough had a total of 8.10 miles (13.04 km) of roadways, of which 6.56 miles (10.56 km) were maintained by the municipality and 1.54 miles (2.48 km) by Passaic County.

The only significant road serving Prospect Park is County Route 504. It enters from Haledon, following Haledon Avenue along the borough's southwestern border with Haledon and Paterson. It then crosses completely into Paterson, turns onto Main Street and reenters Prospect Park for a brief stretch before exiting into Hawthorne.

=== Public transportation ===
NJ Transit provides local bus service on the 722 and 744 routes.

== Notable people ==
People who were born in, residents of, or otherwise closely associated with Prospect Park include:

- Lini De Vries (1905–1982, born Lena Moerkerk), author, public health nurse, and teacher
- Johnny Vander Meer (1914–1997), MLB pitcher, most notably for the Cincinnati Reds, best known as the only pitcher in Major League Baseball history to throw two consecutive no-hitters
