= 2025 New Jersey General Assembly election =

- November 4, 2025

All 80 seats in the New Jersey General Assembly 41 seats needed for a majority
- Turnout: 51.44% ▲24.44pp
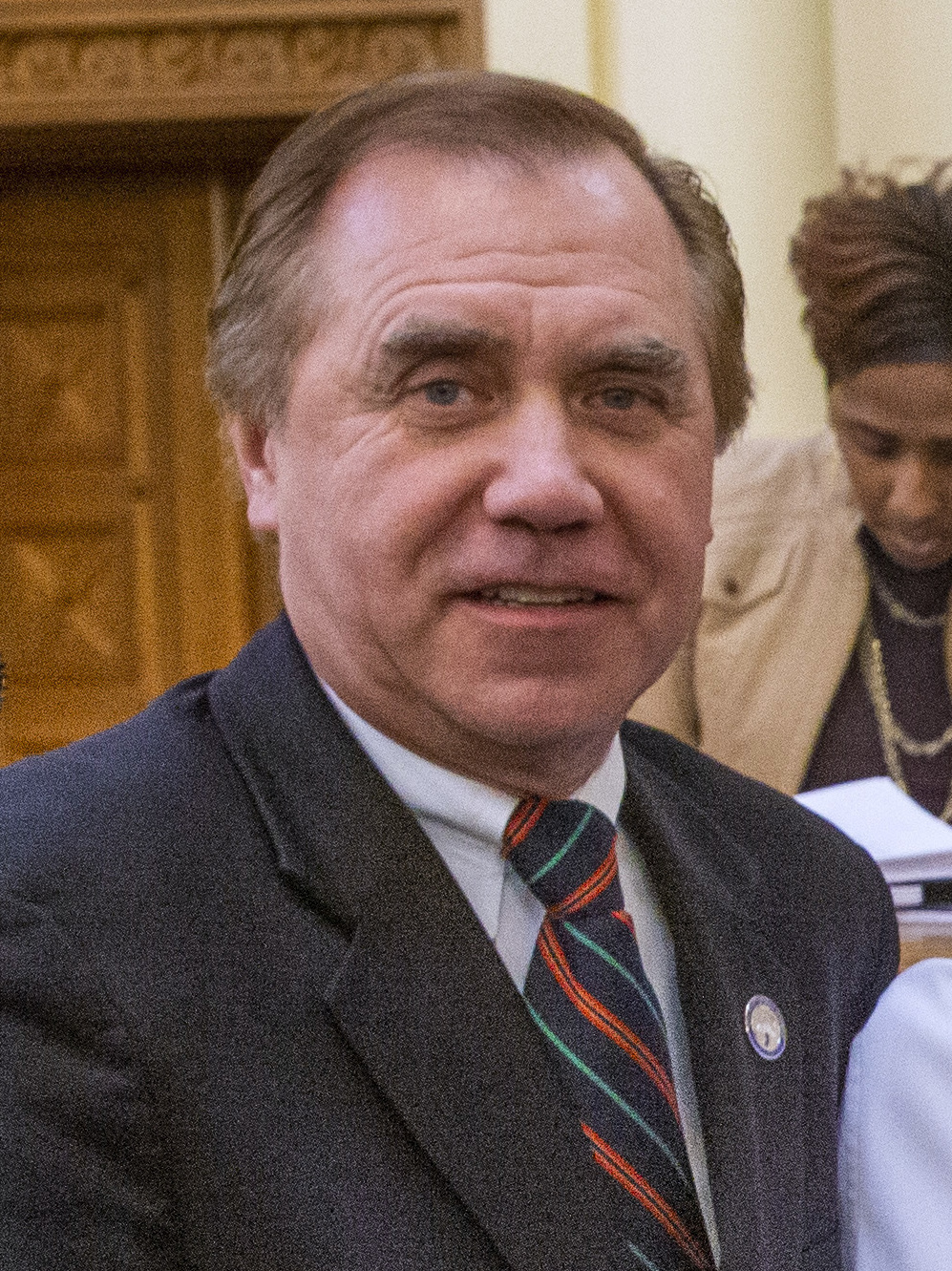

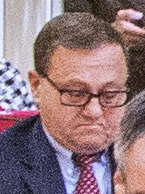
	Majority party	Minority party
Leader	Craig Coughlin	John DiMaio
Party	Democratic	Republican
Leader since	January 9, 2018	January 11, 2022
Leader's seat	19th (Woodbridge)	23rd (Hackettstown)
Last election	52	28
Seats won	57	23
Seat change	▲5	▼5
Popular vote	3,570,461	2,602,318
Percentage	57.8%	42.1%
Swing	▲4.6%	▼4.3%
- Results: Democratic gain Democratic hold Republican hold
Speaker before election
Craig Coughlin
Democratic
Elected Speaker
Craig Coughlin
Democratic

The 2025 New Jersey General Assembly election was held on November 4, 2025. New Jersey voters elected two Assembly members in all of the state's legislative districts for a two-year term to the New Jersey General Assembly. Democrats have held a majority in the chamber since 2002, and further expanded their majority in 2023 by six seats. Primary elections took place on June 10, 2025. The in-person early voting period for the general election ran from October 25 to November 2, 2025.

The June primary was the first election to be held since a new ballot law went into effect. The new law was intended to replace the "county line" ballot design, which gave favorable ballot placement to party-endorsed primary candidates and which was declared unconstitutional by a federal court in 2024. While the elimination of the "county line" resulted in a highly competitive Democratic primary in the 32nd district, in other districts, party-endorsed Democratic and Republican candidates still prevailed. In the 9th and 10th districts, the Democratic primary resulted in a split between party-endorsed and insurgent candidates.

The election resulted in a Democratic supermajority, as they won the largest majority since 1973 by flipping both seats in the 21st district, and one apiece in the 2nd, 8th, and 25th.

== Incumbents not running for re-election ==
=== Democratic ===
- District 20: Reginald Atkins
- District 32: John Allen
- District 33: Julio Marenco
- District 35: Shavonda E. Sumter

== Incumbents defeated ==
=== In primary election ===
==== Democratic ====
- District 28: Garnet Hall lost re-nomination to Chigozie Onyema.
- District 31: Barbara McCann Stamato lost re-nomination to Jerry Walker.
- District 32: Jessica Ramirez lost re-nomination to Ravi Bhalla and Katie Brennan.

=== In general election ===
==== Republican ====
- District 8: Michael Torrissi Jr. lost re-election to Anthony Angelozzi
- District 21: Michele Matsikoudis and Nancy Munoz lost re-election to Andrew Macurdy and Vincent Kearney
- District 25: Christian Barranco lost re-election to Marisa Sweeney
- District 2: Claire Swift lost re-election to Maureen Rowan

== Predictions ==
Source	Ranking	As of
State Navigate	Solid D	November 3, 2025

== Results ==
=== Overview ===
Parties	Candidates	Seats				Popular vote		
Parties	Candidates	2023	2025	+/-	Strength	Vote	%	Change
Democratic	80	52	57	▲5	71.25%	3,570,461	57.8%	▲4.6%
Republican	75	28	23	▼5	28.75%	2,602,318	42.1%	▼4.3%
Libertarian	1	0	0	Steady	0.00%	2,198	0.0%	▼0.1%
Green	2	0	0	Steady	0.00%	2,150	0.0%	Steady
Independent	1	0	0	Steady	0.00%	2,014	0.0%	▼0.6%
Total	159	80	80		100.00%	6,179,141 (Note: In General Assembly elections in New Jersey, voters can vote for two candidates. This results in the total number of votes per party being higher than the number of ballots cast.)	100.00%	
Ballots Cast						3,369,507	100%	
Turnout						3,369,507	51.4%	▲24.4%
Registered						6,549,793	100%	▲1.4%

=== By state legislative district ===
Legislative district	2024 Pres.	Incumbent	Party	Elected Assembly member	Outcome
District 1	R +10.7	Antwan McClellan	Rep	Antwan McClellan	Rep
District 1	R +10.7	Erik Simonsen	Rep	Erik Simonsen	Rep
District 2	D +1.6	Don Guardian	Rep	Don Guardian	Rep
District 2	D +1.6	Claire Swift	Rep	Maureen Rowan	Dem
District 3	R +7.4	Dave Bailey Jr.	Dem	Dave Bailey Jr.	Dem
District 3	R +7.4	Heather Simmons	Dem	Heather Simmons	Dem
District 4	D +1.6	Dan Hutchison	Dem	Dan Hutchison	Dem
District 4	D +1.6	Cody Miller	Dem	Cody Miller	Dem
District 5	D +29.3	William Spearman	Dem	William Spearman	Dem
District 5	D +29.3	Bill Moen	Dem	Bill Moen	Dem
District 6	D +27.4	Louis Greenwald	Dem	Louis Greenwald	Dem
District 6	D +27.4	Melinda Kane	Dem	Melinda Kane	Dem
District 7	D +28.9	Carol A. Murphy	Dem	Carol A. Murphy	Dem
District 7	D +28.9	Balvir Singh	Dem	Balvir Singh	Dem
District 8	D +1.1	Michael Torrissi	Rep	Anthony Angelozzi	Dem
District 8	D +1.1	Andrea Katz	Dem	Andrea Katz	Dem
District 9	R +29.4	Brian E. Rumpf	Rep	Brian E. Rumpf	Rep
District 9	R +29.4	Greg Myhre	Rep	Greg Myhre	Rep
District 10	R +27.8	Gregory P. McGuckin	Rep	Gregory P. McGuckin	Rep
District 10	R +27.8	Paul Kanitra	Rep	Paul Kanitra	Rep
District 11	D +4.3	Margie Donlon	Dem	Margie Donlon	Dem
District 11	D +4.3	Luanne Peterpaul	Dem	Luanne Peterpaul	Dem
District 12	R +25.0	Robert D. Clifton	Rep	Robert D. Clifton	Rep
District 12	R +25.0	Alex Sauickie	Rep	Alex Sauickie	Rep
District 13	R +15.2	Gerard Scharfenberger	Rep	Gerard Scharfenberger	Rep
District 13	R +15.2	Vicky Flynn	Rep	Vicky Flynn	Rep
District 14	D +11.1	Wayne DeAngelo	Dem	Wayne DeAngelo	Dem
District 14	D +11.1	Tennille McCoy	Dem	Tennille McCoy	Dem
District 15	D +41.9	Verlina Reynolds-Jackson	Dem	Verlina Reynolds-Jackson	Dem
District 15	D +41.9	Anthony Verrelli	Dem	Anthony Verrelli	Dem
District 16	D +14.1	Roy Freiman	Dem	Roy Freiman	Dem
District 16	D +14.1	Mitchelle Drulis	Dem	Mitchelle Drulis	Dem
District 17	D +32.0	Joseph Danielsen	Dem	Joseph Danielsen	Dem
District 17	D +32.0	Kevin Egan	Dem	Kevin Egan	Dem
District 18	D +10.1	Robert Karabinchak	Dem	Robert Karabinchak	Dem
District 18	D +10.1	Sterley Stanley	Dem	Sterley Stanley	Dem
District 19	D +0.7	Craig Coughlin	Dem	Craig Coughlin	Dem
District 19	D +0.7	Yvonne Lopez	Dem	Yvonne Lopez	Dem
District 20	D +24.2	Annette Quijano	Dem	Annette Quijano	Dem
District 20	D +24.2	Reginald Atkins	Dem	Ed Rodriguez	Dem
District 21	D +12.2	Nancy Munoz	Rep	Andrew Macurdy	Dem
District 21	D +12.2	Michele Matsikoudis	Rep	Vincent Kearney	Dem
District 22	D +24.8	James J. Kennedy	Dem	James J. Kennedy	Dem
District 22	D +24.8	Linda S. Carter	Dem	Linda S. Carter	Dem
District 23	R +10.1	Erik Peterson	Rep	Erik Peterson	Rep
District 23	R +10.1	John DiMaio	Rep	John DiMaio	Rep
District 24	R +19.4	Dawn Fantasia	Rep	Dawn Fantasia	Rep
District 24	R +19.4	Mike Inganamort	Rep	Mike Inganamort	Rep
District 25	R +0.5	Aura Dunn	Rep	Aura Dunn	Rep
District 25	R +0.5	Christian Barranco	Rep	Marisa Sweeney	Dem
District 26	R +8.8	Jay Webber	Rep	Jay Webber	Rep
District 26	R +8.8	Brian Bergen	Rep	Brian Bergen	Rep
District 27	D +31.1	Rosy Bagolie	Dem	Rosy Bagolie	Dem
District 27	D +31.1	Alixon Collazos-Gill	Dem	Alixon Collazos-Gill	Dem
District 28	D +76.7	Cleopatra Tucker	Dem	Cleopatra Tucker	Dem
District 28	D +76.7	Garnet Hall	Dem	Chigozie Onyema	Dem
District 29	D +41.2	Eliana Pintor Marin	Dem	Eliana Pintor Marin	Dem
District 29	D +41.2	Shanique Speight	Dem	Shanique Speight	Dem
District 30	R +46.3	Sean T. Kean	Rep	Sean T. Kean	Rep
District 30	R +46.3	Avi Schnall	Dem	Avi Schnall	Dem
District 31	D +27.5	William Sampson	Dem	William Sampson	Dem
District 31	D +27.5	Barbara McCann Stamato	Dem	Jerry Walker	Dem
District 32	D +43.2	John Allen	Dem	Katie Brennan	Dem
District 32	D +43.2	Jessica Ramirez	Dem	Ravinder Bhalla	Dem
District 33	D +13.0	Julio Marenco	Dem	Larry Wainstein	Dem
District 33	D +13.0	Gabe Rodriguez	Dem	Gabe Rodriguez	Dem
District 34	D +40.4	Carmen Morales	Dem	Carmen Morales	Dem
District 34	D +40.4	Michael Venezia	Dem	Michael Venezia	Dem
District 35	D +12.0	Shavonda E. Sumter	Dem	Kenyatta Stewart	Dem
District 35	D +12.0	Al Abdelaziz	Dem	Al Abdelaziz	Dem
District 36	R +4.6	Gary Schaer	Dem	Gary Schaer	Dem
District 36	R +4.6	Clinton Calabrese	Dem	Clinton Calabrese	Dem
District 37	D +23.0	Shama Haider	Dem	Shama Haider	Dem
District 37	D +23.0	Ellen Park	Dem	Ellen Park	Dem
District 38	R +0.1	Lisa Swain	Dem	Lisa Swain	Dem
District 38	R +0.1	Chris Tully	Dem	Chris Tully	Dem
District 39	R +2.2	Robert Auth	Rep	Robert Auth	Rep
District 39	R +2.2	John Azzariti	Rep	John Azzariti	Rep
District 40	R +7.3	Christopher DePhillips	Rep	Christopher DePhillips	Rep
District 40	R +7.3	Al Barlas	Rep	Al Barlas	Rep

=== Close races ===
Districts where the difference of total votes between the top two parties was under 10%:

1. District 2, 0.1% gain D
2. District 25, 0.2% gain D
3. District 39, 2.4%
4. District 3, 3.4%
5. District 8, 5.0% gain D
6. District 26, 5.8%
7. District 40, 5.8%
8. District 23, 6.6%
9. District 21, 8.0% gain

== District 1 ==
=== Nominees ===
- Antwan McClellan, incumbent assemblymember
- Erik Simonsen, incumbent assemblymember

==== Endorsements ====
Antwan McClellan

Labor unions

- New Jersey State Firefighters Benevolent Association
Erik Simonsen

Labor unions

- New Jersey State Firefighters Benevolent Association

==== Results ====
Republican primary
Party	Candidate	Votes	%
Republican	Erik Simonsen (incumbent)	14,601	52.34%
Republican	Antwan McClellan (incumbent)	13,295	47.66%
Total votes		27,896	100.00%

=== Democratic primary ===
==== Nominees ====
- Carolyn Rush, engineer and candidate for New Jersey's 2nd congressional district in 2022 and 2024
- Carol Sabo, mayor of West Cape May

==== Eliminated in primary ====
- Brandon Saffold, U.S. Coast Guard veteran and candidate for New Jersey's 2nd congressional district in 2024

==== Endorsements ====
Carolyn Rush

Local officials

- Steven Fulop, mayor of Jersey City (2013–present) (co-endorsement with Saffold)

Organizations

- 314 Action
- CAIR Action NJ (co-endorsement with Saffold)
- Center for Freethought Equality PAC (co-endorsement with Saffold)
- Good Government Coalition of New Jersey
- Working Families Party (co-endorsement with Saffold)
Brandon Saffold

Local officials

- Steven Fulop, mayor of Jersey City (2013–present) (co-endorsement with Rush)

Organizations

- CAIR Action NJ (co-endorsement with Rush)
- Center for Freethought Equality PAC (co-endorsement with Rush)
- Good Government Coalition of New Jersey
- Run for Something
- Working Families Party (co-endorsement with Rush)
Declined to endorse

Political parties

- Cape May County Democratic Committee

==== Results ====
Democratic primary
Party	Candidate	Votes	%
Democratic	Carolyn Rush	9,985	41.48%
Democratic	Carol Sabo	8,381	34.81%
Democratic	Brandon Saffold	5,709	23.71%
Total votes		24,075	100.00%

=== General election ===
==== Predictions ====
Source	Seat	Ranking	As of
State Navigate	Seat 1	Solid R	October 1, 2025
State Navigate	Seat 2	Solid R	October 1, 2025

==== Results ====
1st legislative district general election, 2025
Party	Candidate	Votes	%
Republican	Erik Simonsen (incumbent)	41,848	27.6%
Republican	Antwan McClellan (incumbent)	41,572	27.4%
Democratic	Carolyn Rush	34,237	22.6%
Democratic	Carol Sabo	33,878	22.4%
Total votes		151,535	100.0%
Republican hold			
Republican hold			

== District 2 ==
=== Republican primary ===
==== Nominees ====
- Don Guardian, incumbent assemblymember
- Claire Swift, incumbent assemblymember

==== Endorsements ====
Don Guardian

Labor unions

- New Jersey State Firefighters Benevolent Association
Claire Swift

Labor unions

- New Jersey State Firefighters Benevolent Association

==== Results ====
Republican primary
Party	Candidate	Votes	%
Republican	Don Guardian (incumbent)	11,643	52.35%
Republican	Claire Swift (incumbent)	10,519	47.30%
Total votes		22,162	100%

=== Democratic primary ===
==== Nominees ====
- Joanne Famularo, Pleasantville councilmember
- Maureen Rowan, attorney

==== Eliminated in primary ====
- Lisa Bonanno, Linwood school board member
- Bruce Weekes, former Atlantic City councilmember

==== Endorsements ====
Lisa Bonanno

Local officials

- Ernest Coursey, Atlantic County commissioner from the 1st district (2014–present) (co-endorsement with Weekes)
- Steven Fulop, mayor of Jersey City (2013–present) (co-endorsement with Weekes)
- Marty Small Sr., mayor of Atlantic City (2019–present) (co-endorsement with Weekes)
Joanne Famularo

Organizations

- Good Government Coalition of New Jersey

Political parties

- Atlantic County Democratic Party (co-endorsement with Rowan)
Maureen Rowan

Political parties

- Atlantic County Democratic Party (co-endorsement with Famularo)
Bruce Weekes

Local officials

- Ernest Coursey, Atlantic County commissioner from the 1st district (2014–present) (co-endorsement with Bonanno)
- Steven Fulop, mayor of Jersey City (2013–present) (co-endorsement with Bonanno)
- Marty Small Sr., mayor of Atlantic City (2019–present) (co-endorsement with Bonanno)

==== Results ====
Democratic primary
Party	Candidate	Votes	%
Democratic	Maureen Rowan	8,989	28.88%
Democratic	Joanne Famularo	7,552	24.26%
Democratic	Bruce Weekes	7,497	24.08%
Democratic	Lisa Bonanno	7,092	22.78%
Total votes		31,130	100.00%

=== General election ===
==== Predictions ====
Source	Seat	Ranking	As of
State Navigate	Seat 1	Likely R	October 1, 2025
State Navigate	Seat 2	Likely R	October 1, 2025

==== Results ====
2nd legislative district general election, 2025
Party	Candidate	Votes	%
Republican	Don Guardian (incumbent)	39,913	25.4%
Democratic	Maureen Rowan	39,484	25.1%
Democratic	Joanne Famularo	39,291	25.0%
Republican	Claire Swift (incumbent)	38,610	24.6%
Total votes		157,298	100.0%
Republican hold			
Democratic gain from Republican			

== District 3 ==
=== Democratic primary ===
==== Nominees ====
- David Bailey, incumbent assemblymember
- Heather Simmons, incumbent assemblymember

==== Endorsements ====
David Bailey

Labor unions

- New Jersey State Firefighters Benevolent Association
- SEIU 32BJ (co-endorsement with Simmons)
Heather Simmons

Labor unions

- New Jersey State Firefighters Benevolent Association
- SEIU 32BJ (co-endorsement with Bailey)

==== Results ====
Democratic primary
Party	Candidate	Votes	%
Democratic	Heather Simmons (incumbent)	20,552	51.30%
Democratic	David Bailey (incumbent)	19,512	48.70%
Total votes		40,064	100.00%

=== Republican primary ===
==== Nominees ====
- Chris Konawel, Gloucester County commissioner
- Lawrence Moore, Harrison Township deputy mayor

==== Withdrawn ====
- Arthur Marchand, Cumberland County commissioner
- Ed Ramsay, Salem County commissioner
- Beth Sawyer, former assemblymember (2022–2024) and candidate for the 3rd Senate district in 2023
- Jason Witcher, attorney

==== Declined ====
- Bethanne McCarthy Patrick, former assemblymember (2022–2024) (running for Salem County surrogate)
- Mickey Ostrum, Salem County commissioner, candidate for the 3rd Senate district in 2023 (running for Salem County Surrogate)
- Tom Tedesco, Hopewell Township committeemember and candidate for this district in 2023

==== Endorsements ====
Chris Konawel

Political parties

- Gloucester County Republican Committee (co-endorsement with Moore)
- Salem County Republican Committee (co-endorsement with Ramsay)
Lawrence Moore

Political parties

- Cumberland County Republican Committee (co-endorsement with Ramsay)
- Gloucester County Republican Committee (co-endorsement with Konawel)
Ed Ramsay (withdrawn)

Political parties

- Cumberland County Republican Committee (co-endorsement with Moore)
- Salem County Republican Committee (co-endorsement with Konawel)

==== Convention results ====
Cumberland County Republican convention
Party	Candidate	Votes	%
Republican	Lawrence Moore	–	–
Republican	Ed Ramsay	–	–
Republican	Chris Konawel	–	–
Total votes		– (Note: Vote totals were not publicly announced)	–

Salem County Republican convention
Party	Candidate	Votes	%
Republican	Ed Ramsay	45	36.6%
Republican	Chris Konawel	42	34.1%
Republican	Lawrence Moore	27	22.0%
Republican	Beth Sawyer	9	7.3%
Total votes		123	100.0%

Gloucester County Republican convention
Party	Candidate	Votes	%
Republican	Lawrence Moore	58	40.8%
Republican	Chris Konawel	49	34.5%
Republican	Beth Sawyer	35	24.6%
Total votes		142	100.0%

==== Primary results ====
Republican primary
Party	Candidate	Votes	%
Republican	Chris Konawel	12,961	50.62%
Republican	Lawrence Moore	12,644	49.38%
Total votes		25,605	100.00%

=== General election ===
==== Predictions ====
Source	Seat	Ranking	As of
State Navigate	Seat 1	Likely R (flip)	October 1, 2025
State Navigate	Seat 2	Likely R (flip)	October 1, 2025

==== Results ====
3rd legislative district general election, 2025
Party	Candidate	Votes	%
Democratic	Heather Simmons (incumbent)	47,878	25.9%
Democratic	David Bailey (incumbent)	47,626	25.8%
Republican	Chris Konawel	44,823	24.3%
Republican	Lawrence Moore	44,385	24.0%
Total votes		184,712	100.0%
Democratic hold			
Democratic hold			

== District 4 ==
=== Democratic primary ===
==== Nominees ====
- Dan Hutchison, incumbent assemblymember
- Cody Miller, incumbent assemblymember

==== Eliminated in primary ====
- Brian Everett, assistant dean of Rutgers University–Camden
- Vonetta Hawkins, activist

==== Endorsements ====
Brian Everett

Local officials

- Steven Fulop, mayor of Jersey City (2013–present) (co-endorsement with Hawkins)

Organizations

- CAIR Action NJ (co-endorsement with Hawkins)
- Food & Water Action (co-endorsement with Hawkins)
- Good Government Coalition of New Jersey
- Working Families Party
Vonetta Hawkins

Local officials

- Steven Fulop, mayor of Jersey City (2013–present) (co-endorsement with Everett)

Organizations

- CAIR Action NJ (co-endorsement with Everett)
- Food & Water Action (co-endorsement with Everett)
- Good Government Coalition of New Jersey
Dan Hutchison

Labor unions

- Communications Workers of America District 1 (co-endorsement with Miller)
- New Jersey State Firefighters Benevolent Association
Cody Miller

Labor unions

- Communications Workers of America District 1 (co-endorsement with Hutchison)
- New Jersey State Firefighters Benevolent Association

==== Results ====
Democratic primary
Party	Candidate	Votes	%
Democratic	Cody Miller (incumbent)	14,830	31.21%
Democratic	Dan Hutchison (incumbent)	14,821	31.20%
Democratic	Vonetta Hawkins	10,218	21.51%
Democratic	Brian Everett	7,640	16.08%
Total votes		47,509	100.00%

=== Republican primary ===
==== Nominees ====
- Amanda Esposito, teacher and nominee for this district in 2023
- Jerry McManus, realtor

==== Eliminated in primary ====
- Barbara McCormick, nurse

==== Withdrawn ====
- Brandon Glikas, Winslow Township committeemember

==== Endorsements ====
Amanda Esposito

State legislators

- George Geist, former state senator from the 4th district (2003–2004) (co-endorsement with McManus)

Political parties

- Gloucester County Republican Committee (co-endorsement with McManus)
Jerry McManus

State legislators

- George Geist, former state senator from the 4th district (2003–2004) (co-endorsement with Esposito)

Political parties

- Gloucester County Republican Committee (co-endorsement with Esposito)

==== Convention results ====
Gloucester County Republican convention
Party	Candidate	Votes	%
Republican	Amanda Esposito	47	42.7%
Republican	Jerry McManus	32	29.1%
Republican	Barbara McCormick	31	28.2%
Total votes		110	100.0%

==== Primary results ====
Republican primary
Party	Candidate	Votes	%
Republican	Amanda Esposito	9,205	37.83%
Republican	Jerry McManus	8,387	34.47%
Republican	Barbara McCormick	6,738	27.69%
Total votes		24,330	100.00%

=== General election ===
==== Predictions ====
Source	Seat	Ranking	As of
State Navigate	Seat 1	Tossup	October 1, 2025
State Navigate	Seat 2	Tossup	October 1, 2025

==== Results ====
4th legislative district general election, 2025
Party	Candidate	Votes	%
Democratic	Dan Hutchison (incumbent)	52,286	27.8%
Democratic	Cody Miller (incumbent)	52,065	27.6%
Republican	Amanda Esposito	42,488	22.6%
Republican	Jerry McManus	41,579	22.1%
Total votes		188,418	100.0%
Democratic hold			
Democratic hold			

== District 5 ==
=== Democratic primary ===
==== Nominees ====
- Bill Moen, incumbent assemblymember
- William Spearman, incumbent assemblymember

==== Withdrawn ====
- Rashan Prailow, non-profit executive

==== Endorsements ====
Bill Moen

Labor unions

- LiUNA! New Jersey (co-endorsement with Spearman)
- New Jersey State Firefighters Benevolent Association
- SEIU 32BJ (co-endorsement with Spearman)
William Spearman

Labor unions

- LiUNA! New Jersey (co-endorsement with Moen)
- New Jersey State Firefighters Benevolent Association
- SEIU 32BJ (co-endorsement with Moen)
Rashan Prailow (withdrawn)

Local officials

- Steven Fulop, mayor of Jersey City (2013–present)

==== Results ====
Democratic primary
Party	Candidate	Votes	%
Democratic	William Spearman (incumbent)	22,116	50.72%
Democratic	Bill Moen (incumbent)	21,485	49.28%
Total votes		43,601	100.00%

=== Republican primary ===
- Constance Lee Ditzel
- Nilsa Gonzalez

==== Results ====
Republican primary
Party	Candidate	Votes	%
Republican	Constance Lee Ditzel	5,571	51.54%
Republican	Nilsa Gonzalez	5,238	48.46%
Total votes		10,809	100.00%

=== General election ===
==== Predictions ====
Source	Seat	Ranking	As of
State Navigate	Seat 1	Solid D	October 6, 2025
State Navigate	Seat 2	Solid D	October 6, 2025

==== Results ====
5th legislative district general election, 2025
Party	Candidate	Votes	%
Democratic	William Spearman (incumbent)	49,369	35.2%
Democratic	Bill Moen (incumbent)	49,258	35.1%
Republican	Nilsa Gonzalez	20,233	14.4%
Republican	Constance Lee Ditzel	20,225	14.4%
Green	Robin Brownfield	1,172	0.8%
Total votes		140,257	100.0%
Democratic hold			
Democratic hold			

== District 6 ==
=== Special replacement convention ===
Incumbent Assemblymember Pamela Rosen Lampitt resigned in order to become the Camden County clerk. Under the state constitution, vacancies must be filled within 35 days by the members of the county committee of the political party that the outgoing member was a part of. On January 11, 2025, Camden County Commissioner Melinda Kane was chosen unopposed to fill the vacancy.

==== Declared ====
- Melinda Kane, Camden County commissioner

==== Convention results ====
Special replacement convention
Party	Candidate	Votes	%
Democratic	Melinda Kane	Unopposed	
Total votes		N/A	100.0%

=== Democratic primary ===
==== Nominees ====
- Louis Greenwald, incumbent assemblymember
- Melinda Kane, incumbent assemblymember

==== Eliminated in primary ====
- Rebecca Holloway, former Clementon school board member
- Kevin Ryan, data analyst

==== Endorsements ====
Louis Greenwald

Labor unions

- Communications Workers of America District 1 (co-endorsement with Kane)
- LiUNA! New Jersey
- New Jersey State Firefighters Benevolent Association
- SEIU 32BJ (co-endorsement with Kane)
Rebecca Holloway

Local officials

- Steven Fulop, mayor of Jersey City (2013–present) (co-endorsement with Ryan)

Organizations

- CAIR Action NJ (co-endorsement with Ryan)
- Food & Water Action (co-endorsement with Ryan)
- Good Government Coalition of New Jersey
- Working Families Party (co-endorsement with Ryan)
Melinda Kane

Labor unions

- Communications Workers of America District 1 (co-endorsement with Greenwald)
- New Jersey State Firefighters Benevolent Association
- SEIU 32BJ (co-endorsement with Greenwald)
Kevin Ryan

Local officials

- Steven Fulop, mayor of Jersey City (2013–present) (co-endorsement with Holloway)

Organizations

- CAIR Action NJ (co-endorsement with Holloway)
- Food & Water Action (co-endorsement with Holloway)
- Good Government Coalition of New Jersey
- Working Families Party (co-endorsement with Holloway)

==== Results ====
Democratic primary
Party	Candidate	Votes	%
Democratic	Melinda Kane (incumbent)	17,425	29.95%
Democratic	Louis Greenwald (incumbent)	16,955	29.21%
Democratic	Rebecca Holloway	14,147	24.32%
Democratic	Kevin Ryan	9,646	16.58%
Total votes		58,173	100.00%

=== Nominees ===
- Jack Brangan, businessman
- Peter Sykes, nurse

==== Results ====
Republican primary
Party	Candidate	Votes	%
Republican	Jack Brangan	8,425	52.03%
Republican	Peter Sykes	7,769	47.97%
Total votes		16,194	100.00%

=== General election ===
==== Predictions ====
Source	Seat	Ranking	As of
State Navigate	Seat 1	Solid D	October 6, 2025
State Navigate	Seat 2	Solid D	October 6, 2025

==== Results ====
6th legislative district general election, 2025
Party	Candidate	Votes	%
Democratic	Louis Greenwald (incumbent)	62,791	34.6%
Democratic	Melinda Kane (incumbent)	62,098	34.2%
Republican	Jack Brangan	28,655	15.8%
Republican	Peter Sykes	27,812	15.3%
Total votes		181,356	100.0%
Democratic hold			
Democratic hold			

== District 7 ==
=== Special replacement convention ===
Incumbent Assemblyman Herb Conaway resigned in order to take his seat in Congress, after winning his election in the 3rd congressional district in 2024. Under the state constitution, vacancies must be filled within 35 days by the members of the county committee of the political party that the outgoing member was a part of. Burlington County Democratic Chair Matt Riggins originally proposed a "caretaker" proposal, where there would be an interim caretaker who would finish Conaway's term but pledge not to run for the full term in order to not give an "incumbency advantage." Gillespie backed the plan and pledged not to run to fill the remainder of Conaway's term, while Singh saying he would run in the special replacement convention. Outgoing County Commissioner Daniel O'Connell entered the replacement convention while pledging not to run for the full term in the June primary. After the Democratic county committee members voted down the caretaker plan proposed by Riggins, Gillespie entered the replacement convention while O'Connell withdrew. On January 25, Singh defeated Gillespie to fill the vacancy.

==== Declared ====
- Nicole Gillespie, Moorestown councilmember
- Balvir Singh, Burlington County commissioner (2018–present)

==== Withdrawn ====
- Daniel O'Connell, former Burlington County commissioner (2019–2025)

===== Endorsements =====
Nicole Gillespie

Labor Unions

- Burlington County AFL-CIO
Daniel O'Connell (withdrawn)

State legislators

- Carol A. Murphy, state assemblymember from the 7th district (2018–present)
- Troy Singleton, state senator from the 7th district (2018–present)

Local officials

- ~~Nicole Gillespie, Moorestown councilmember~~ (ran in special replacement convention)

Party officials

- Matt Riggins, Burlington County Democratic chair

==== Convention results ====
Special replacement convention
Party	Candidate	Votes	%
Democratic	Balvir Singh	172	64.9%
Democratic	Nicole Gillespie	93	35.1%
Total votes		265	100.0%

=== Democratic primary ===
==== Nominees ====
- Carol A. Murphy, incumbent assemblymember
- Balvir Singh, incumbent assemblymember

==== Eliminated in primary ====
- Eric Holliday, mayor of Bordentown Township (2025–present)

==== Withdrawn ====
- Nicole Gillespie, Moorestown councilmember

==== Endorsements ====
Carol Murphy

State legislators

- Troy Singleton, state senator from the 7th district (2018–present)

Political parties

- Burlington County Democratic Committee (co-endorsement with Singh)

Labor unions

- Communications Workers of America District 1 (co-endorsement with Singh)
- New Jersey State Firefighters Benevolent Association
- SEIU 32BJ (co-endorsement with Singh)

Organizations

- New Jersey League of Conservation Voters
Eric Holliday

Local officials

- Steven Fulop, mayor of Jersey City (2013–present)

Organizations

- LGBTQ+ Victory Fund
Balvir Singh

Political parties

- Burlington County Democratic Committee (co-endorsement with Murphy)

Labor unions

- Communications Workers of America District 1 (co-endorsement with Murphy)
- New Jersey State Firefighters Benevolent Association
- SEIU 32BJ (co-endorsement with Murphy)

Organizations

- 314 Action
- CAIR Action NJ
- Center for Freethought Equality PAC
- Good Government Coalition of New Jersey
- National Organization for Women New Jersey
- Run for Something

==== Results ====
Democratic primary
Party	Candidate	Votes	%
Democratic	Carol A. Murphy (incumbent)	20,940	46.12%
Democratic	Balvir Singh (incumbent)	12,586	27.72%
Democratic	Eric Holliday	11,880	26.16%
Total votes		45,406	100.00%

=== Republican primary ===
==== Nominees ====
- Doug Dillon, former Moorestown Zoning Board member, nominee for this seat in 2021 and 2023
- Dione Johnson, psychologist

==== Results ====
Republican primary
Party	Candidate	Votes	%
Republican	Doug Dillon	8,672	51.70%
Republican	Dione Johnson	8,102	48.30%
Total votes		16,774	100.00%

=== General election ===
==== Predictions ====
Source	Seat	Ranking	As of
State Navigate	Seat 1	Solid D	October 6, 2025
State Navigate	Seat 2	Solid D	October 6, 2025

==== Results ====
7th legislative district general election, 2025
Party	Candidate	Votes	%
Democratic	Carol A. Murphy (incumbent)	62,681	34.0%
Democratic	Balvir Singh (incumbent)	60,758	33.0%
Republican	Doug Dillon	30,556	16.6%
Republican	Dione Johnson	30,122	16.4%
Total votes		184,117	100.0%
Democratic hold			
Democratic hold			

== District 8 ==
=== Republican primary ===
==== Nominees ====
- Michael Torrissi, incumbent assemblymember
- Brandon Umba, former assemblymember (2022–2024)

==== Endorsements ====
Brandon Umba

State legislators

- Latham Tiver, state senator from the 8th district (2024–present)
- Michael Torrissi, state assemblymember from the 8th district (2022–present)

==== Results ====
Republican primary
Party	Candidate	Votes	%
Republican	Michael Torrissi (incumbent)	14,391	55.18%
Republican	Brandon Umba	11,687	44.82%
Total votes		26,078	100.00%

=== Democratic primary ===
==== Nominees ====
- Anthony Angelozzi, president of the Hammonton Education Association and nominee for this district in 2023
- Andrea Katz, incumbent assemblymember

==== Eliminated in primary ====
- Eddie Freeman, Evesham councilmember

==== Endorsements ====
Anthony Angelozzi

Labor unions

- New Jersey State Firefighters Benevolent Association
- SEIU 32BJ (co-endorsement with Katz)
Eddie Freeman

Local officials

- Steven Fulop, mayor of Jersey City (2013–present)

Organizations

- CAIR Action NJ
- Good Government Coalition of New Jersey
- LGBTQ+ Victory Fund
Andrea Katz

Labor unions

- Communications Workers of America District 1
- New Jersey State Firefighters Benevolent Association
- SEIU 32BJ (co-endorsement with Angelozzi)

==== Results ====
Democratic primary
Party	Candidate	Votes	%
Democratic	Andrea Katz (incumbent)	16,681	47.89%
Democratic	Anthony Angelozzi	11,635	33.40%
Democratic	Eddie Freeman	6,516	18.71%
Total votes		34,832	100.00%

=== General election ===
==== Predictions ====
Source	Seat	Ranking	As of
State Navigate	Seat 1	Lean R (flip)	October 1, 2025
State Navigate	Seat 2	Lean R	October 1, 2025

==== Results ====
8th legislative district general election, 2025
Party	Candidate	Votes	%
Democratic	Anthony Angelozzi	50,168	26.3%
Democratic	Andrea Katz (incumbent)	50,036	26.2%
Republican	Michael Torrissi (incumbent)	46,262	24.3%
Republican	Brandon Umba	44,300	23.2%
Total votes		190,766	100.0%
Democratic gain from Republican			
Democratic hold			

== District 9 ==
=== Republican primary ===
==== Nominees ====
- Greg Myhre, incumbent assemblymember
- Brian Rumpf, incumbent assemblymember

==== Endorsements ====
Brian Rumpf

State legislators

- Carmen Amato, state senator from the 9th district (2024–present) (co-endorsement with Myhre)

Party officials

- George Gilmore, Ocean County Republican chair (co-endorsement with Myhre)

Labor unions

- New Jersey State Firefighters Benevolent Association
Greg Myhre

State legislators

- Carmen Amato, state senator from the 9th district (2024–present) (co-endorsement with Rumpf)

Party officials

- George Gilmore, Ocean County Republican chair (co-endorsement with Rumpf)

Labor unions

- New Jersey State Firefighters Benevolent Association

==== Results ====
Republican primary
Party	Candidate	Votes	%
Republican	Brian Rumpf (incumbent)	22,511	54.00%
Republican	Greg Myhre (incumbent)	19,180	46.00%
Total votes		41,691	100.00%

=== Democratic primary ===
==== Nominees ====
- Lisa Bennet, paralegal
- Rosalee Keech, former Montville Democratic chair

==== Eliminated in primary ====
- Donald Campbell, non-profit executive

==== Endorsements ====
Lisa Bennet

Political parties

- Ocean County Democratic Committee
Donald Campbell

Local officials

- Steven Fulop, mayor of Jersey City (2013–present)
Rosalee Keech

Local officials

- Steven Fulop, mayor of Jersey City (2013–present)

Organizations

- Good Government Coalition of New Jersey

==== Results ====
Democratic primary
Party	Candidate	Votes	%
Democratic	Lisa Bennet	10,802	40.12%
Democratic	Rosalee Keech	9,812	36.45%
Democratic	Donald Campbell	6,307	23.43%
Total votes		26,921	100.00%

=== General election ===
==== Predictions ====
Source	Seat	Ranking	As of
State Navigate	Seat 1	Solid R	October 1, 2025
State Navigate	Seat 2	Solid R	October 1, 2025

==== Results ====
9th legislative district general election, 2025
Party	Candidate	Votes	%
Republican	Brian Rumpf (incumbent)	70,501	32.2%
Republican	Greg Myhre (incumbent)	69,087	31.5%
Democratic	Lisa Bennet	40,108	18.3%
Democratic	Rosalee Keech	39,342	18.0%
Total votes		219,038	100.0%
Republican hold			
Republican hold			

== District 10 ==
=== Republican primary ===
==== Nominees ====
- Paul Kanitra, incumbent assemblymember
- Gregory McGuckin, incumbent assemblymember

==== Endorsements ====
Paul Kanitra

Labor unions

- New Jersey State Firefighters Benevolent Association
Gregory McGuckin

Labor unions

- New Jersey State Firefighters Benevolent Association

==== Results ====
Republican primary
Party	Candidate	Votes	%
Republican	Gregory McGuckin (incumbent)	18,816	51.80%
Republican	Paul Kanitra (incumbent)	17,505	48.20%
Total votes		36,321	100.00%

=== Democratic primary ===
==== Nominees ====
- Janine Bauer, former Essex County commissioner
- Gigi Esparza, former mayor of South Toms River

==== Withdrawn ====
- Debra DiDonato, South Toms River Democratic chair (withdrew after primary election)

==== Eliminated in primary ====
- Philip Nufrio, Seaside Park Democratic chair

==== Endorsements ====
Janine Bauer

Political parties

- Monmouth County Democratic Party

Organizations

- National Organization for Women New Jersey
Debra DiDonato

Local officials

- Steven Fulop, mayor of Jersey City (2013–present) (co-endorsement with Nufrio)

Organizations

- Center for Freethought Equality PAC
Philip Nufrio

Local officials

- Steven Fulop, mayor of Jersey City (2013–present) (co-endorsement with DiDonato)

==== Results ====
Democratic primary
Party	Candidate	Votes	%
Democratic	Debra DiDonato	9,250	42.30%
Democratic	Janine Bauer	7,933	36.28%
Democratic	Philip Nufrio	4,685	21.42%
Total votes		21,868	100.00%

=== General election ===
==== Predictions ====
Source	Seat	Ranking	As of
State Navigate	Seat 1	Solid R	October 1, 2025
State Navigate	Seat 2	Solid R	October 1, 2025

==== Results ====
10th legislative district general election, 2025
Party	Candidate	Votes	%
Republican	Gregory McGuckin (incumbent)	61,890	31.7%
Republican	Paul Kanitra (incumbent)	61,316	31.4%
Democratic	Janine Bauer	36,355	18.6%
Democratic	Gigi Esparza	35,738	18.3%
Total votes		195,299	100.0%
Republican hold			
Republican hold			

== District 11 ==
=== Democratic primary ===
==== Nominees ====
- Margie Donlon, incumbent assemblymember
- Luanne Peterpaul, incumbent assemblymember

==== Endorsements ====
Margie Donlon

Political parties

- Monmouth County Democratic Party (co-endorsement with Peterpaul)

Labor unions

- LiUNA! New Jersey (co-endorsement with Peterpaul)
- New Jersey State Firefighters Benevolent Association
- SEIU 32BJ (co-endorsement with Peterpaul)

Organizations

- 314 Action
Luanne Peterpaul

Political parties

- Monmouth County Democratic Party (co-endorsement with Donlon)

Labor unions

- LiUNA! New Jersey (co-endorsement with Donlon)
- New Jersey State Firefighters Benevolent Association
- SEIU 32BJ (co-endorsement with Donlon)

Organizations

- LGBTQ+ Victory Fund

==== Results ====
Democratic primary
Party	Candidate	Votes	%
Democratic	Margie Donlon (incumbent)	17,115	51.88%
Democratic	Luanne Peterpaul (incumbent)	15,872	48.12%
Total votes		32,987	100.00%

=== Republican primary ===
==== Nominees ====
- Jessica Ford, realtor
- Andrew Wardell, former mayor of Neptune City

==== Results ====
Republican primary
Party	Candidate	Votes	%
Republican	Andrew Wardell	10,622	51.78%
Republican	Jessica Ford	9,892	48.22%
Total votes		20,514	100.00%

=== General election ===
==== Predictions ====
Source	Seat	Ranking	As of
State Navigate	Seat 1	Lean D	October 1, 2025
State Navigate	Seat 2	Lean D	October 1, 2025

==== Results ====
11th legislative district general election, 2025
Party	Candidate	Votes	%
Democratic	Margie Donlon (incumbent)	48,477	27.7%
Democratic	Luanne Peterpaul (incumbent)	48,166	27.6%
Republican	Andrew Wardell	38,234	21.9%
Republican	Jessica Ford	37,906	21.7%
We the People	Felicia Simmons	2,014	1.1%
Total votes		174,797	100.0%
Democratic hold			
Democratic hold			

== District 12 ==
=== Republican primary ===
==== Nominees ====
- Robert Clifton, incumbent assemblymember
- Alex Sauickie, incumbent assemblymember

==== Endorsements ====
Robert Clifton

Labor unions

- LiUNA! New Jersey (co-endorsement with Sauickie)
- New Jersey State Firefighters Benevolent Association

Local officials

- 6 mayors (co-endorsement with Sauickie)
Alex Sauickie

Labor unions

- LiUNA! New Jersey (co-endorsement with Clifton)
- New Jersey State Firefighters Benevolent Association

Local officials

- 6 mayors (co-endorsement with Clifton)

==== Results ====
Republican primary
Party	Candidate	Votes	%
Republican	Robert Clifton (incumbent)	13,682	53.07%
Republican	Alex Sauickie (incumbent)	12,099	46.93%
Total votes		25,781	100.00%

=== Democratic primary ===
==== Nominees ====
- Kyler Daneen, entrepreneur
- Freshta Taeb, activist

==== Endorsements ====
Kyler Daneen

Political parties

- Burlington County Democratic Committee
- Middlesex County Democratic Committee
- Monmouth County Democratic Committee
- Ocean County Democratic Committee
Freshta Taeb

Local officials

- Steven Fulop, mayor of Jersey City (2013–present)

Organizations

- CAIR Action NJ
- Good Government Coalition of New Jersey

==== Results ====
Democratic primary
Party	Candidate	Votes	%
Democratic	Kyler Daneen	10,768	52.28%
Democratic	Freshta Taeb	9,829	47.72%
Total votes		20,597	100.00%

=== General election ===
==== Predictions ====
Source	Seat	Ranking	As of
State Navigate	Seat 1	Solid R	October 1, 2025
State Navigate	Seat 2	Solid R	October 1, 2025

==== Results ====
12th legislative district general election, 2025
Party	Candidate	Votes	%
Republican	Robert Clifton (incumbent)	54,756	31.0%
Republican	Alex Sauickie (incumbent)	53,704	30.4%
Democratic	Kyler Daneen	34,479	19.5%
Democratic	Freshta Taeb	33,597	19.0%
Total votes		176,536	100.0%
Republican hold			
Republican hold			

== District 13 ==
=== Republican primary ===
==== Nominees ====
- Vicky Flynn, incumbent assemblymember
- Gerard Scharfenberger, incumbent assemblymember

==== Eliminated in primary ====
- Rich Castaldo, businessman

==== Endorsements ====
Vicky Flynn

State legislators

- John DiMaio, minority leader of the New Jersey General Assembly (2022–present) from the 23rd district (2009–present) (co-endorsement with Scharfenberger)
- Declan O'Scanlon, state senator from the 13th district (2018–present) (co-endorsement with Scharfenberger)

Local officials

- Shaun Golden, Monmouth County sheriff (co-endorsement with Scharfenberger)
Gerard Scharfenberger

State legislators

- John DiMaio, minority leader of the New Jersey General Assembly (2022–present) from the 23rd district (2009–present) (co-endorsement with Flynn)
- Declan O'Scanlon, state senator from the 13th district (2018–present) (co-endorsement with Flynn)

Local officials

- Shaun Golden, Monmouth County sheriff (co-endorsement with Flynn)

==== Results ====
Republican primary
Party	Candidate	Votes	%
Republican	Gerard Scharfenberger (incumbent)	12,120	39.05%
Republican	Vicky Flynn (incumbent)	10,457	33.69%
Republican	Rich Castaldo	8,462	27.26%
Total votes		31,039	100.00%

=== Democratic primary ===
==== Nominees ====
- Jason Corley, Long Branch High School athletic director
- Vaibhav Gorige

==== Endorsements ====
Jason Corley

Political parties

- Monmouth County Democratic Party (co-endorsement with Gorige)
Vaibhav Gorige

Political parties

- Monmouth County Democratic Party (co-endorsement with Corley)

==== Results ====
Democratic primary
Party	Candidate	Votes	%
Democratic	Jason M. Corley Sr.	14,596	53.01%
Democratic	Vaibhav Gorige	12,936	46.99%
Total votes		27,532	100.00%

=== General election ===
==== Predictions ====
Source	Seat	Ranking	As of
State Navigate	Seat 1	Solid R	October 1, 2025
State Navigate	Seat 2	Solid R	October 1, 2025

==== Results ====
13th legislative district general election, 2025
Party	Candidate	Votes	%
Republican	Vicky Flynn (incumbent)	58,840	28.9%
Republican	Gerard Scharfenberger (incumbent)	58,334	28.7%
Democratic	Jason M. Corley Sr.	44,078	21.7%
Democratic	Vaibhav Gorige	42,031	20.7%
Total votes		203,283	100.0%
Republican hold			
Republican hold			

== District 14 ==
=== Democratic primary ===
==== Nominees ====
- Wayne DeAngelo, incumbent assemblymember
- Tennille McCoy, incumbent assemblymember

==== Disqualified ====
- Dave Luciano, environmental specialist

==== Endorsements ====
Wayne DeAngelo

Labor unions

- LiUNA! New Jersey (co-endorsement with McCoy)
- SEIU 32BJ (co-endorsement with McCoy)
Tennille McCoy

Labor unions

- LiUNA! New Jersey (co-endorsement with DeAngelo)
- SEIU 32BJ (co-endorsement with DeAngelo)
Dave Luciano (disqualified)

Local officials

- Steven Fulop, mayor of Jersey City (2013–present)

==== Results ====
Democratic primary
Party	Candidate	Votes	%
Democratic	Wayne DeAngelo (incumbent)	18,464	51.51%
Democratic	Tennille McCoy (incumbent)	17,838	48.49%
Total votes		35,847	100.00%

=== Republican primary ===
==== Nominees ====
- Marty Flynn, former director of athletics at Trenton Catholic Academy
- Joseph Stillwell, Mercer County GOP state committeeman

==== Results ====
Republican primary
Party	Candidate	Votes	%
Republican	Marty Flynn	8,813	51.02%
Republican	Joseph Stillwell	8,459	48.98%
Total votes		17,272	100.00%

=== General election ===
==== Predictions ====
Source	Seat	Ranking	As of
State Navigate	Seat 1	Solid D	October 1, 2025
State Navigate	Seat 2	Solid D	October 1, 2025

==== Results ====
14th legislative district general election, 2025
Party	Candidate	Votes	%
Democratic	Wayne DeAngelo (incumbent)	53,636	31.1%
Democratic	Tennille McCoy (incumbent)	50,850	29.5%
Republican	Marty Flynn	33,851	19.6%
Republican	Joseph Stillwell	33,260	19.3%
Green	Steven Welzer	978	0.6%
Total votes		172,575	100.0%
Democratic hold			
Democratic hold			

== District 15 ==
=== Democratic primary ===
==== Nominees ====
- Verlina Reynolds-Jackson, incumbent assemblymember
- Anthony Verrelli, incumbent assemblymember

==== Endorsements ====
Verlina Reynolds-Jackson

Labor unions

- LiUNA! New Jersey
- SEIU 32BJ (co-endorsement with Verrelli)
Anthony Verrelli

Labor unions

- SEIU 32BJ (co-endorsement with Reynolds-Jackson)

==== Results ====
Democratic primary
Party	Candidate	Votes	%
Democratic	Verlina Reynolds-Jackson (incumbent)	20,755	53.76%
Democratic	Anthony Verrelli (incumbent)	17,851	46.24%
Total votes		38,606	100.00%

=== Republican primary ===
No Republicans filed.

Republican primary
Party	Candidate	Votes	%
Republican	Write-in	231	100.00%
Total votes		231	100.00%

=== General election ===
==== Predictions ====
Source	Seat	Ranking	As of
State Navigate	Seat 1	Solid D	October 1, 2025
State Navigate	Seat 2	Solid D	October 1, 2025

==== Results ====
15th legislative district general election, 2025
Party	Candidate	Votes	%
Democratic	Verlina Reynolds-Jackson (incumbent)	56,563	50.85%
Democratic	Anthony Verrelli (incumbent)	54,676	49.15%
Total votes		111,239	100.00%
Democratic hold			
Democratic hold			

== District 16 ==
=== Democratic primary ===
==== Nominees ====
- Mitchelle Drulis, incumbent assemblymember
- Roy Freiman, incumbent assemblymember

==== Eliminated in primary ====
- Mahmoud Desouky, activist

==== Endorsements ====
Mahmoud Desouky

Organizations

- CAIR Action NJ
- Good Government Coalition of New Jersey
Mitchelle Drulis

Political parties

- Somerset County Democratic Committee (co-endorsement with Freiman)

Labor unions

- Communications Workers of America District 1 (co-endorsement with Freiman)
- LiUNA! New Jersey (co-endorsement with Freiman)
- New Jersey Education Association (co-endorsement with Freiman)
- SEIU 32BJ (co-endorsement with Freiman)
- New Jersey Firefighters Mutual Benevolent Association (co-endorsement with Freiman)

Organizations

- Brady Campaign (co-endorsement with Freiman)
- Center for Freethought Equality PAC
- New Jersey Fraternal Order of Police (co-endorsement with Freiman)
- New Jersey League of Conservation Voters (co-endorsement with Freiman)
- New Jobs PAC (co-endorsement with Freiman)
Roy Freiman

Political parties

- Somerset County Democratic Committee (co-endorsement with Drulis)

Labor unions

- Communications Workers of America District 1 (co-endorsement with Drulis)
- LiUNA! New Jersey (co-endorsement with Drulis)
- New Jersey Education Association (co-endorsement with Drulis)
- SEIU 32BJ (co-endorsement with Drulis)
- New Jersey Firefighters Mutual Benevolent Association (co-endorsement with Drulis)

Organizations

- Brady Campaign (co-endorsement with Drulis)
- Center for Freethought Equality PAC
- New Jersey Fraternal Order of Police (co-endorsement with Drulis)
- New Jersey League of Conservation Voters (co-endorsement with Drulis)
- New Jobs PAC (co-endorsement with Drulis)

==== Results ====
Democratic primary
Party	Candidate	Votes	%
Democratic	Mitchelle Drulis (incumbent)	16,899	44.73%
Democratic	Roy Freiman (incumbent)	16,745	44.32%
Democratic	Mahmoud Desouky	4,140	10.96%
Total votes		37,784	100.00%

=== Republican primary ===
==== Nominees ====
- Catherine Payne, Hillsborough deputy mayor
- Scott Sipos, Raritan Township committeemember

==== Results ====
Republican primary
Party	Candidate	Votes	%
Republican	Scott Sipos	12,113	51.59%
Republican	Catherine Payne	11,367	48.41%
Total votes		23,480	100.00%

=== General election ===
==== Predictions ====
Source	Seat	Ranking	As of
State Navigate	Seat 1	Likely D	October 1, 2025
State Navigate	Seat 2	Likely D	October 1, 2025

==== Results ====
16th legislative district general election, 2025
Party	Candidate	Votes	%
Democratic	Roy Freiman (incumbent)	56,476	29.9%
Democratic	Mitchelle Drulis (incumbent)	55,773	29.6%
Republican	Catherine Payne	38,344	20.3%
Republican	Scott Sipos	38,128	20.2%
Total votes		188,721	100.0%
Democratic hold			
Democratic hold			

== District 17 ==
=== Democratic primary ===
==== Nominees ====
- Joseph Danielsen, incumbent assemblymember
- Kevin Egan, incumbent assemblymember

==== Eliminated in primary ====
- Loretta Rivers, Piscataway school board member

==== Endorsements ====
Joseph Danielsen

U.S. representatives

- Bonnie Watson Coleman, U.S. representative from New Jersey's 12th congressional district (2015–present) (co-endorsement with Egan)

Political parties

- Somerset County Democratic Committee (co-endorsement with Egan)

Labor unions

- Communications Workers of America District 1 (co-endorsement with Egan)
- LiUNA! New Jersey (co-endorsement with Egan)
- SEIU 32BJ (co-endorsement with Egan)

Organizations

- New Jersey League of Conservation Voters
Kevin Egan

U.S. representatives

- Bonnie Watson Coleman, U.S. representative from New Jersey's 12th congressional district (2015–present) (co-endorsement with Danielsen)

Political parties

- Somerset County Democratic Committee (co-endorsement with Danielsen)

Labor unions

- Communications Workers of America District 1 (co-endorsement with Danielsen)
- LiUNA! New Jersey (co-endorsement with Danielsen)
- SEIU 32BJ (co-endorsement with Danielsen)
Loretta Rivers

Local officials

- Steven Fulop, mayor of Jersey City (2013–present)

Organizations

- CAIR Action NJ
- Food & Water Action
- Good Government Coalition of New Jersey
- Piscataway Progressive Democratic Organization
- Working Families Party

==== Results ====
Democratic primary
Party	Candidate	Votes	%
Democratic	Kevin Egan (incumbent)	11,428	35.61%
Democratic	Joseph Danielsen (incumbent)	10,564	32.92%
Democratic	Loretta Rivers	10,101	31.47%
Total votes		32,093	100.00%

=== Republican primary ===
==== Nominees ====
- Patricia Badovinac, nominee for this district in 2019
- Susan Hucko, nominee for this district in 2023

==== Results ====
Republican primary
Party	Candidate	Votes	%
Republican	Patricia Badovinac	3,497	52.30%
Republican	Susan Hucko	3,189	47.70%
Total votes		6,686	100.00%

=== General election ===
==== Predictions ====
Source	Seat	Ranking	As of
State Navigate	Seat 1	Solid D	October 1, 2025
State Navigate	Seat 2	Solid D	October 1, 2025

==== Results ====
17th legislative district general election, 2025
Party	Candidate	Votes	%
Democratic	Kevin Egan (incumbent)	46,879	38.4%
Democratic	Joseph Danielsen (incumbent)	46,101	37.8%
Republican	Patricia Badovinac	14,626	12.0%
Republican	Susan Hucko	14,514	11.9%
Total votes		122,120	100.0%
Democratic hold			
Democratic hold			

== District 18 ==
=== Democratic primary ===
==== Nominees ====
- Robert Karabinchak, incumbent assemblymember
- Sterley Stanley, incumbent assemblymember

==== Eliminated in primary ====
- Christopher Binetti, perennial candidate

==== Withdrawn ====
- David Tingle, U.S. Army veteran

==== Endorsements ====
Christopher Binetti

Local officials

- Steven Fulop, mayor of Jersey City (2013–present)

Organizations

- Good Government Coalition of New Jersey
Robert Karabinchak

Labor unions

- Communications Workers of America District 1 (co-endorsement with Stanley)
- SEIU 32BJ (co-endorsement with Stanley)

Organizations

- New Jersey League of Conservation Voters (co-endorsement with Stanley)
Sterley Stanley

Labor unions

- Communications Workers of America District 1 (co-endorsement with Karabinchak)
- LiUNA! New Jersey
- SEIU 32BJ (co-endorsement with Karabinchak)

Organizations

- New Jersey League of Conservation Voters (co-endorsement with Karabinchak)
David Tingle (withdrawn)

Local officials

- Steven Fulop, mayor of Jersey City (2013–present)

==== Results ====
Democratic primary
Party	Candidate	Votes	%
Democratic	Robert Karabinchak (incumbent)	19,290	45.92%
Democratic	Sterley Stanley (incumbent)	18,257	43.46%
Democratic	Christopher Binetti	4,458	10.61%
Total votes		42,005	100.00%

=== Republican primary ===
==== Nominees ====
- Eugene DeMarzo, podiatrist
- Melanie Mott, South Plainfield councilmember

==== Results ====
Republican primary
Party	Candidate	Votes	%
Republican	Eugene DeMarzo	5,881	51.23%
Republican	Melanie Mott	5,599	48.77%
Total votes		11,480	100.00%

=== General election ===
==== Predictions ====
Source	Seat	Ranking	As of
State Navigate	Seat 1	Solid D	October 1, 2025
State Navigate	Seat 2	Solid D	October 1, 2025

==== Results ====
18th legislative district general election, 2025
Party	Candidate	Votes	%
Democratic	Robert Karabinchak (incumbent)	49,195	32.7%
Democratic	Sterley Stanley (incumbent)	48,638	32.3%
Republican	Melanie Mott	26,567	17.6%
Republican	Eugene DeMarzo	26,170	17.4%
Total votes		150,570	100.0%
Democratic hold			
Democratic hold			

== District 19 ==
=== Democratic primary ===
==== Nominees ====
- Craig Coughlin, incumbent assemblymember
- Yvonne Lopez, incumbent assemblymember

==== Eliminated in primary ====
- Michelle Burwell, former New Jersey Department of Children and Families supervisor and candidate for the 19th Senate district in 2023

==== Endorsements ====
Michelle Burwell

Organizations

- Good Government Coalition of New Jersey
Craig Coughlin

Labor unions

- Communications Workers of America District 1 (co-endorsement with Lopez)
- LiUNA! New Jersey (co-endorsement with Lopez)
- SEIU 32BJ (co-endorsement with Lopez)
Yvonne Lopez

Labor unions

- Communications Workers of America District 1 (co-endorsement with Coughlin)
- LiUNA! New Jersey (co-endorsement with Coughlin)
- SEIU 32BJ (co-endorsement with Coughlin)

Organizations

- National Organization for Women New Jersey

==== Results ====
Democratic primary
Party	Candidate	Votes	%
Democratic	Yvonne Lopez (incumbent)	11,707	44.39%
Democratic	Craig Coughlin (incumbent)	11,016	41.77%
Democratic	Michelle Burwell	3,652	13.85%
Total votes		26,375	100.00%

=== Republican primary ===
==== Nominees ====
- Marilyn Colon, nominee for this district in 2023
- Maria Garcia, nominee for the 19th Senate district in 2023

==== Results ====
Republican primary
Party	Candidate	Votes	%
Republican	Marilyn Colon	4,786	54.25%
Republican	Maria Garcia	4,036	45.75%
Total votes		8,822	100.00%

=== General election ===
==== Predictions ====
Source	Seat	Ranking	As of
State Navigate	Seat 1	Likely D	October 1, 2025
State Navigate	Seat 2	Likely D	October 1, 2025

==== Results ====
19th legislative district general election, 2025
Party	Candidate	Votes	%
Democratic	Craig Coughlin (incumbent)	40,047	32.3%
Democratic	Yvonne Lopez (incumbent)	39,692	32.0%
Republican	Maria Garcia	22,189	17.9%
Republican	Marilyn Colon	22,003	17.8%
Total votes		123,931	100.0%
Democratic hold			
Democratic hold			

== District 20 ==
=== Democratic primary ===
==== Nominees ====
- Annette Quijano, incumbent assemblymember
- Eduardo Rodriguez, former Elizabeth director of Planning and Community Development

==== Eliminated in primary ====
- Sergio Granados, Union County commissioner (2014–present)
- Walter Wimbush, activist

==== Declined ====
- Reginald Atkins, incumbent assemblymember (endorsed Granados and Quijano)
- Jamel Holley, former assemblymember (2015–2022) (endorsed Granados)

==== Endorsements ====
Sergio Granados

U.S. representatives

- LaMonica McIver, U.S. representative from New Jersey's 10th congressional district (2024–present) (co-endorsement with Quijano)

State legislators

- Reginald Atkins, state assemblymember from the 20th district (2008–present) (co-endorsement with Quijano)
- Joseph Cryan, state senator from the 20th district (2018–present) (co-endorsement with Quijano)
- Jamel Holley, former state assemblymember from the 20th district (2015–2022)
- Annette Quijano, state assemblymember from the 20th district (2008–present)

Local officials

- J. Christian Bollwage, mayor of Elizabeth (1993–present) (co-endorsement with Quijano)
- Donald Shaw, mayor of Roselle (co-endorsement with Quijano)

Party officials

- 2 Democratic municipal chairs (co-endorsement with Quijano)

Labor unions

- SEIU 32BJ (co-endorsement with Quijano)
Annette Quijano

U.S. representatives

- LaMonica McIver, U.S. representative from New Jersey's 10th congressional district (2024–present) (co-endorsement with Granados)

State legislators

- Reginald Atkins, state assemblymember from the 20th district (2008–present) (co-endorsement with Granados)
- Joseph Cryan, state senator from the 20th district (2018–present) (co-endorsement with Granados)

Local officials

- J. Christian Bollwage, mayor of Elizabeth (1993–present) (co-endorsement with Granados)
- Donald Shaw, mayor of Roselle (co-endorsement with Granados)

Party officials

- 2 Democratic municipal chairs (co-endorsement with Granados)

Labor unions

- Communications Workers of America District 1
- LiUNA! New Jersey
- SEIU 32BJ (co-endorsement with Granados)
Eduardo Rodriguez

Organizations

- Good Government Coalition of New Jersey
Walter Wimbush

Organizations

- Good Government Coalition of New Jersey

==== Results ====
Democratic primary
Party	Candidate	Votes	%
Democratic	Annette Quijano (incumbent)	8,741	31.48%
Democratic	Eduardo Rodriguez	6,733	24.25%
Democratic	Sergio Granados	6,635	23.90%
Democratic	Walter Wimbush	5,654	20.37%
Total votes		27,763	100.00%

=== Republican primary ===
==== Nominee ====
- Carmen Bucco, businessman and perennial candidate

==== Disqualified ====
- Richard Tabor, Army veteran

==== Results ====
Republican primary
Party	Candidate	Votes	%
Republican	Carmen Bucco	2,664	100.00%
Total votes		2,664	100.00%

=== General election ===
==== Predictions ====
Source	Seat	Ranking	As of
State Navigate	Seat 1	Solid D	October 1, 2025
State Navigate	Seat 2	Solid D	October 1, 2025

==== Results ====
20th legislative district general election, 2025
Party	Candidate	Votes	%
Democratic	Annette Quijano (incumbent)	35,616	43.1%
Democratic	Eduardo Rodriguez	35,139	42.6%
Republican	Carmen Bucco	11,795	14.3%
Total votes		82,550	100.0%
Democratic hold			
Democratic hold			

== District 21 ==
=== Republican primary ===
==== Nominees ====
- Michele Matsikoudis, incumbent assemblymember
- Nancy Munoz, incumbent assemblymember

==== Withdrawn ====
- Steve Spurr, former Summit Republicans chair and candidate for this district in 2021

==== Declined ====
- Jennifer Asay, mayor of Bernards (endorsed Matsikoudis and Munoz)

==== Endorsements ====
Michele Matsikoudis

U.S. representatives

- Thomas Kean Jr., U.S. representative from New Jersey's 7th congressional district (2023–present) (co-endorsement with Munoz)

State legislators

- John DiMaio, minority leader of the New Jersey General Assembly (2022–present) from the 23rd district (2009–present) (co-endorsement with Munoz)

Local officials

- 7 Morris County commissioners (co-endorsement with Munoz)
- 14 mayors (co-endorsement with Munoz)

Party officials

- County Republican chairs of Middlesex, Morris, Somerset, and Union counties (co-endorsement with Munoz)
- 18 Republican municipal chairs (co-endorsement with Munoz)
Nancy Munoz

U.S. representatives

- Thomas Kean Jr., U.S. representative from New Jersey's 7th congressional district (2023–present) (co-endorsement with Matsikoudis)

State legislators

- John DiMaio, minority leader of the New Jersey General Assembly (2022–present) from the 23rd district (2009–present) (co-endorsement with Matsikoudis)

Local officials

- 7 Morris County commissioners (co-endorsement with Matsikoudis)
- 14 mayors (co-endorsement with Matsikoudis)

Party officials

- County Republican chairs of Middlesex, Morris, Somerset, and Union counties (co-endorsement with Matsikoudis)
- 18 Republican municipal chairs (co-endorsement with Matsikoudis)

==== Results ====
Republican primary
Party	Candidate	Votes	%
Republican	Nancy Munoz (incumbent)	12,582	50.30%
Republican	Michele Matsikoudis (incumbent)	12,433	49.70%
Total votes		25,015	100.00%

=== Democratic primary ===
==== Nominees ====
- Vincent Kearney, Garwood councilmember
- Andrew Macurdy, lawyer

==== Endorsements ====
Vincent Kearney

U.S. representatives

- LaMonica McIver, U.S. representative from New Jersey's 10th congressional district (2024–present) (co-endorsement with Macurdy)

Political parties

- Morris County Democratic Committee (co-endorsement with Macurdy)
- Somerset County Democratic Committee (co-endorsement with Macurdy)
- Union County Democratic Committee (co-endorsement with Macurdy)

Organizations

- College Democrats of New Jersey (co-endorsement with Macurdy)
Andrew Macurdy

U.S. representatives

- LaMonica McIver, U.S. representative from New Jersey's 10th congressional district (2024–present) (co-endorsement with Kearney)

Political parties

- Morris County Democratic Committee (co-endorsement with Kearney)
- Somerset County Democratic Committee (co-endorsement with Kearney)
- Union County Democratic Committee (co-endorsement with Kearney)

Organizations

- College Democrats of New Jersey (co-endorsement with Kearney)

==== Results ====
Democratic primary
Party	Candidate	Votes	%
Democratic	Andrew Macurdy	17,510	51.05%
Democratic	Vincent Kearney	16,786	48.95%
Total votes		34,296	100.00%

=== General election ===
==== Predictions ====
Source	Seat	Ranking	As of
State Navigate	Seat 1	Lean R	October 1, 2025
State Navigate	Seat 2	Lean R	October 1, 2025

==== Results ====
21st legislative district general election, 2025
Party	Candidate	Votes	%
Democratic	Andrew Macurdy	54,965	27.3%
Democratic	Vincent Kearney	53,881	26.7%
Republican	Michele Matsikoudis (incumbent)	46,385	23.0%
Republican	Nancy Munoz (incumbent)	46,367	23.0%
Total votes		201,598	100.0%
Democratic gain from Republican			
Democratic gain from Republican			

== District 22 ==
=== Democratic primary ===
==== Nominees ====
- Linda Carter, incumbent assemblymember
- James Kennedy, incumbent assemblymember

==== Endorsements ====
Linda Carter

Political parties

- Somerset County Democratic Committee (co-endorsement with Kennedy)

Labor unions

- LiUNA! New Jersey (co-endorsement with Kennedy)
- SEIU 32BJ (co-endorsement with Kennedy)
James Kennedy

Political parties

- Somerset County Democratic Committee (co-endorsement with Carter)

Labor unions

- LiUNA! New Jersey (co-endorsement with Carter)
- SEIU 32BJ (co-endorsement with Carter)

==== Results ====
Democratic primary
Party	Candidate	Votes	%
Democratic	Linda Carter (incumbent)	20,189	56.27%
Democratic	James Kennedy (incumbent)	15,689	43.73%
Total votes		35,878	100.00%

=== Republican primary ===
==== Nominees ====
- Jermaine Caulder
- Lisa Fabrizio, Linden Republican municipal chair and nominee for this district in 2023

==== Results ====
Republican primary
Party	Candidate	Votes	%
Republican	Lisa Fabrizio	5,860	57.19%
Republican	Jermaine Caulder	4,386	42.81%
Total votes		10,246	100.00%

=== General election ===
==== Predictions ====
Source	Seat	Ranking	As of
State Navigate	Seat 1	Solid D	October 1, 2025
State Navigate	Seat 2	Solid D	October 1, 2025

==== Results ====
22nd legislative district general election, 2025
Party	Candidate	Votes	%
Democratic	Linda Carter (incumbent)	51,977	34.7%
Democratic	James Kennedy (incumbent)	50,909	34.0%
Republican	Lisa Fabrizio	23,884	16.0%
Republican	Jermaine Caulder	22,919	15.3%
Total votes		149,689	100.0%
Democratic hold			
Democratic hold			

== District 23 ==
=== Republican primary ===
==== Nominees ====
- John DiMaio, incumbent assemblymember
- Erik Peterson, incumbent assemblymember

==== Withdrawn ====
- Nicolas Carra, mayor of Raritan
- John-Paul Levin, former Bound Brook councilmember
- Matt Moench, mayor of Bridgewater Township

==== Endorsements ====
John DiMaio

State legislators

- Doug Steinhardt, state senator from the 23rd district (2022–present) and Warren County Republican chair (2004–present) (co-endorsement with Peterson)

Local officials

- Fred Brown, Hunterdon County, New Jersey sheriff (co-endorsement with Peterson)
- 2 Hunterdon County commissioners (co-endorsement with Peterson)

Party officials

- Gabe Plumer, Hunterdon County Republican chair (co-endorsement with Peterson)
Erik Peterson

State legislators

- Doug Steinhardt, state senator from the 23rd district (2022–present) and Warren County Republican chair (2004–present) (co-endorsement with DiMaio)

Local officials

- Fred Brown, Hunterdon County, New Jersey sheriff (co-endorsement with DiMaio)
- 2 Hunterdon County commissioners (co-endorsement with DiMaio)

Party officials

- Gabe Plumer, Hunterdon County Republican chair (co-endorsement with DiMaio)

==== Results ====
Republican primary
Party	Candidate	Votes	%
Republican	John DiMaio (incumbent)	17,794	53.54%
Republican	Erik Peterson (incumbent)	15,438	46.46%
Total votes		33,232	100.00%

=== Democratic primary ===
==== Nominees ====
- Guy Citron, nominee for this district in 2023
- Tyler Powell, nominee for this district in 2023

==== Endorsements ====
Guy Citron

State legislators

- Vin Gopal, state senator from the 11th district (2018–present) (post-primary, co-endorsement with Powell)

Local officials

- Steven Fulop, mayor of Jersey City (2013–present) (co-endorsement with Powell)

Organizations

- CAIR Action NJ

Political parties

- Forward Party (co-endorsement with Powell)
- Somerset County Democratic Committee (co-endorsement with Powell)
Tyler Powell

State legislators

- Vin Gopal, state senator from the 11th district (2018–present) (post-primary, co-endorsement with Citron)

Local officials

- Steven Fulop, mayor of Jersey City (2013–present) (co-endorsement with Citron)

Political parties

- Somerset County Democratic Committee (co-endorsement with Citron)
- Forward Party (co-endorsement with Citron)

==== Results ====
Democratic primary
Party	Candidate	Votes	%
Democratic	Tyler Powell	13,257	51.58%
Democratic	Guy Citron	12,447	48.42%
Total votes		25,704	100.00%

=== General election ===
==== Predictions ====
Source	Seat	Ranking	As of
State Navigate	Seat 1	Solid R	October 1, 2025
State Navigate	Seat 2	Solid R	October 1, 2025

==== Results ====
23rd legislative district general election, 2025
Party	Candidate	Votes	%
Republican	John DiMaio (incumbent)	51,383	27.2%
Republican	Erik Peterson (incumbent)	49,438	26.1%
Democratic	Tyler Powell	44,629	23.6%
Democratic	Guy Citron	43,709	23.1%
Total votes		189,159	100.0%
Republican hold			
Republican hold			

== District 24 ==
=== Republican primary ===
==== Nominees ====
- Dawn Fantasia, incumbent assemblymember
- Mike Inganamort, incumbent assemblymember

==== Endorsements ====
Dawn Fantasia

State legislators

- Doug Steinhardt, state senator from the 23rd district (2022–present) and Warren County Republican chair (2004–present) (co-endorsement with Inganamort)

Party officials

- County Republican chairs of Morris and Sussex counties (co-endorsement with Inganamort)
Mike Inganamort

State legislators

- Doug Steinhardt, state senator from the 23rd district (2022–present) and Warren County Republican chair (2004–present) (co-endorsement with Fantasia)

Party officials

- County Republican chairs of Morris and Sussex counties (co-endorsement with Fantasia)

==== Results ====
Republican primary
Party	Candidate	Votes	%
Republican	Dawn Fantasia (incumbent)	19,735	50.62%
Republican	Mike Inganamort (incumbent)	19,254	49.38%
Total votes		38,989	100.00%

=== Democratic primary ===
==== Nominees ====
- Steve Barratt, activist
- Eugene Grinberg, attorney

==== Endorsements ====
Steve Barratt

Local officials

- Steven Fulop, mayor of Jersey City (2013–present)

Organizations

- Good Government Coalition of New Jersey
Eugene Grinberg

Political parties

- Sussex County Democratic Committee

==== Results ====
Democratic primary
Party	Candidate	Votes	%
Democratic	Steve Barratt	13,301	52.99%
Democratic	Eugene Grinberg	11,800	47.01%
Total votes		25,101	100.00%

=== General election ===
==== Predictions ====
Source	Seat	Ranking	As of
State Navigate	Seat 1	Solid R	October 1, 2025
State Navigate	Seat 2	Solid R	October 1, 2025

==== Results ====
24th legislative district general election, 2025
Party	Candidate	Votes	%
Republican	Dawn Fantasia (incumbent)	56,003	29.4%
Republican	Mike Inganamort (incumbent)	54,964	28.8%
Democratic	Steve Barratt	40,772	21.4%
Democratic	Eugene Grinberg	36,736	19.3%
Libertarian	Lana Leguia	2,198	1.1%
Total votes		190,673	100.0%
Republican hold			
Republican hold			

== District 25 ==
=== Republican primary ===
==== Nominees ====
- Christian Barranco, incumbent assemblymember
- Aura K. Dunn, incumbent assemblymember

==== Endorsements ====
Christian Barranco

State legislators

- Anthony M. Bucco, minority leader of the New Jersey Senate (2023–present) from the 25th district (2019–present) (co-endorsement with Dunn)

Party officials

- County Republican chairs of Morris and Passaic counties (co-endorsement with Dunn)
Aura K. Dunn

State legislators

- Anthony M. Bucco, minority leader of the New Jersey Senate (2023–present) from the 25th district (2019–present) (co-endorsement with Barranco)

Party officials

- County Republican chairs of Morris and Passaic counties (co-endorsement with Barranco)

==== Results ====
Republican primary
Party	Candidate	Votes	%
Republican	Christian Barranco (incumbent)	14,070	50.56%
Republican	Aura K. Dunn (incumbent)	13,756	49.44%
Total votes		27,826	100.00%

=== Democratic primary ===
==== Nominees ====
- Steve Pylypchuk, Morristown councilmember
- Marisa Sweeney, Morristown Planning Board member

==== Endorsements ====
Steve Pylypchuk

Local officials

- Steven Fulop, mayor of Jersey City (2013–present) (co-endorsement with Sweeney)

Organizations

- 314 Action (co-endorsement with Sweeney)
- Center for Freethought Equality PAC (co-endorsement with Sweeney)
- Good Government Coalition of New Jersey
Marisa Sweeney

Local officials

- Steven Fulop, mayor of Jersey City (2013–present) (co-endorsement with Pylypchuk)

Organizations

- 314 Action (co-endorsement with Pylypchuk)
- Center for Freethought Equality PAC (co-endorsement with Pylypchuk)
Declined to endorse

Political parties

- Morris County Democratic Committee

==== Results ====
Democratic primary
Party	Candidate	Votes	%
Democratic	Marisa Sweeney	18,024	52.40%
Democratic	Steve Pylypchuk	16,376	47.60%
Total votes		34,400	100.00%

=== General election ===
==== Predictions ====
Source	Seat	Ranking	As of
State Navigate	Seat 1	Likely R	October 1, 2025
State Navigate	Seat 2	Likely R	October 1, 2025

==== Results ====
25th legislative district general election, 2025
Party	Candidate	Votes	%
Democratic	Marisa Sweeney	49,918	25.6%
Republican	Aura K. Dunn (incumbent)	49,088	25.2%
Republican	Christian Barranco (incumbent)	48,125	24.7%
Democratic	Steve Pylypchuk	47,723	24.5%
Total votes		194,854	100.0%
Democratic gain from Republican			
Republican hold			

== District 26 ==
=== Republican primary ===
==== Nominees ====
- Brian Bergen, incumbent assemblymember
- Jay Webber, incumbent assemblymember

==== Results ====
Republican primary
Party	Candidate	Votes	%
Republican	Jay Webber (incumbent)	17,376	52.48%
Republican	Brian Bergen (incumbent)	15,731	47.52%
Total votes		33,107	100.00%

=== Democratic primary ===
==== Nominees ====
- Michael Mancuso
- Walter Mielarczyk, nominee for this seat in 2023

==== Results ====
Democratic primary
Party	Candidate	Votes	%
Democratic	Michael Mancuso	15,550	51.40%
Democratic	Walter Mielarczyk	14,702	48.60%
Total votes		30,252	100.00%

=== General election ===
==== Predictions ====
Source	Seat	Ranking	As of
State Navigate	Seat 1	Solid R	October 1, 2025
State Navigate	Seat 2	Solid R	October 1, 2025

==== Results ====
26th legislative district general election, 2025
Party	Candidate	Votes	%
Republican	Jay Webber (incumbent)	51,086	26.7%
Republican	Brian Bergen (incumbent)	50,050	26.2%
Democratic	Michael Mancuso	45,771	23.9%
Democratic	Walter Mielarczyk	44,379	23.2%
Total votes		191,286	100.0%
Republican hold			
Republican hold			

== District 27 ==
=== Democratic primary ===
==== Nominees ====
- Rosy Bagolie, incumbent assemblymember
- Alixon Collazos-Gill, incumbent assemblymember

==== Eliminated in primary ====
- Rohit Dave, corporate development professional
- Blake Michael, teacher

==== Withdrawn ====
- James Spango, mayor of Roseland

==== Endorsements ====
Rosy Bagolie

U.S. representatives

- LaMonica McIver, U.S. representative from New Jersey's 10th congressional district (2024–present) (co-endorsement with Collazos-Gill)

Local officials

- Joseph N. DiVincenzo Jr., Essex County executive (2003–present) (co-endorsement with Collazos-Gill)
- Patricia Sebold, Essex County commissioner

Labor unions

- Communications Workers of America District 1 (co-endorsement with Collazos-Gill)
- LiUNA! New Jersey (co-endorsement with Collazos-Gill)
- New Jersey Education Association (co-endorsement with Collazos-Gill)
- SEIU 32BJ (co-endorsement with Collazos-Gill)

Organizations

- Center for Freethought Equality PAC
- National Organization for Women New Jersey (co-endorsement with Collazos-Gill)
- New Jersey League of Conservation Voters (co-endorsement with Collazos-Gill)
Alixon Collazos-Gill

U.S. representatives

- LaMonica McIver, U.S. representative from New Jersey's 10th congressional district (2024–present) (co-endorsement with Bagolie)

Local officials

- Joseph N. DiVincenzo Jr., Essex County executive (2003–present) (co-endorsement with Bagolie)

Labor unions

- Communications Workers of America District 1 (co-endorsement with Bagolie)
- LiUNA! New Jersey (co-endorsement with Bagolie)
- New Jersey Education Association (co-endorsement with Bagolie)
- SEIU 32BJ (co-endorsement with Bagolie)

Organizations

- National Organization for Women New Jersey (co-endorsement with Bagolie)
- New Jersey League of Conservation Voters (co-endorsement with Bagolie)
- Working Families Party
Rohit Dave

Local officials

- Steven Fulop, mayor of Jersey City (2013–present)

Organizations

- Good Government Coalition of New Jersey
Blake Michael

Organizations

- Good Government Coalition of New Jersey

==== Results ====
Democratic primary
Party	Candidate	Votes	%
Democratic	Alixon Collazos-Gill (incumbent)	15,803	33.55%
Democratic	Rosy Bagolie (incumbent)	15,181	32.23%
Democratic	Rohit Dave	8,089	17.17%
Democratic	Blake Michael	8,028	17.04%
Total votes		47,101	100.00%

=== Republican primary ===
==== Nominees ====
- Robert Iommazzo, consultant
- Adam Kraemer, perennial candidate

==== Endorsements ====
Robert Iommazzo

Political parties

- Essex County Republican Committee (co-endorsement with Kraemer)
Adam Kraemer

Political parties

- Essex County Republican Committee (co-endorsement with Iommazzo)

==== Results ====
Republican primary
Party	Candidate	Votes	%
Republican	Robert Iommazzo	4,289	50.18%
Republican	Adam Kraemer	4,258	49.82%
Total votes		8,547	100.00%

=== General election ===
==== Predictions ====
Source	Seat	Ranking	As of
State Navigate	Seat 1	Solid D	October 1, 2025
State Navigate	Seat 2	Solid D	October 1, 2025

==== Results ====
27th legislative district general election, 2025
Party	Candidate	Votes	%
Democratic	Rosy Bagolie (incumbent)	58,598	36.1%
Democratic	Alixon Collazos-Gill (incumbent)	56,902	35.0%
Republican	Adam Kraemer	24,013	14.8%
Republican	Robert Iommazzo	22,834	14.1%
Total votes		162,347	100.0%
Democratic hold			
Democratic hold			

== District 28 ==
=== Democratic primary ===
==== Nominees ====
- Chigozie Onyema, Newark West Ward Democratic chair and former assistant commissioner for the New Jersey Department of Community Affairs
- Cleopatra Tucker, incumbent assemblymember

==== Eliminated in primary ====
- Garnet Hall, incumbent assemblymember

==== Disqualified ====
- Nadirah Brown, community activist

==== Declined ====
- Dupré Kelly, Newark Municipal Councilmember from the West Ward

==== Endorsements ====
Garnet Hall

Local officials

- Steven Fulop, mayor of Jersey City (2013–present)

Political parties

- ~~Union County Democratic Committee (co-endorsement with Onyema)~~ (switched endorsement to Tucker due to Hall's support of Fulop)

Labor unions

- New Jersey Education Association (co-endorsement with Onyema)

Organizations

- Good Government Coalition of New Jersey
- New Jersey League of Conservation Voters (co-endorsement with Onyema)
- SOMA Action (co-endorsement with Onyema)
Chigozie Onyema

Political parties

- Essex County Democratic Committee (co-endorsement with Tucker)
- Union County Democratic Committee (co-endorsement with Tucker)

Labor unions

- Communications Workers of America District 1 (co-endorsement with Tucker)
- New Jersey Education Association (co-endorsement with Hall)
- SEIU 32BJ (co-endorsement with Tucker)

Organizations

- CAIR Action NJ
- New Jersey League of Conservation Voters (co-endorsement with Hall)
- SOMA Action (co-endorsement with Hall)
- Working Families Party
Cleopatra Tucker

U.S. representatives

- LaMonica McIver, U.S. representative from New Jersey's 10th congressional district (2024–present)

Political parties

- Essex County Democratic Committee (co-endorsement with Onyema)
- Union County Democratic Committee (co-endorsement with Onyema) (previously endorsed Hall)

Labor unions

- Communications Workers of America District 1 (co-endorsement with Onyema)
- LiUNA! New Jersey
- SEIU 32BJ (co-endorsement with Onyema)

==== Convention results ====
Essex County Democratic convention
Party	Candidate	Votes	%
Democratic	Chigozie Onyema	141	43.4%
Democratic	Cleopatra Tucker (incumbent)	120	36.9%
Democratic	Garnet Hall (incumbent)	64	19.7%
Total votes		325	100.0%

==== Primary results ====
Democratic primary
Party	Candidate	Votes	%
Democratic	Cleopatra Tucker (incumbent)	14,109	38.65%
Democratic	Chigozie Onyema	13,456	36.86%
Democratic	Garnet Hall (incumbent)	8,937	24.48%
Total votes		36,502	100.00%

=== Republican primary ===
==== Disqualified ====
- Che Colter
- Willie Jetti, nominee for this district in 2023

==== Withdrawn ====
- Toye Kumolu, auditor

==== Endorsements ====
Che Colter (disqualified)

Political parties

- Essex County Republican Committee (co-endorsement with Jetti)
Willie Jetti (disqualified)

Political parties

- Essex County Republican Committee (co-endorsement with Colter)

==== Results ====
Republican primary
Party	Candidate	Votes	%
Republican	Write-in	23	100.00%
Total votes		23	100.00%

=== General election ===
==== Predictions ====
Source	Seat	Ranking	As of
State Navigate	Seat 1	Solid D	October 1, 2025
State Navigate	Seat 2	Solid D	October 1, 2025

==== Results ====
28th legislative district general election, 2025
Party	Candidate	Votes	%
Democratic	Cleopatra Tucker (incumbent)	47,998	50.39%
Democratic	Chigozie Onyema	47,263	49.61%
Total votes		95,261	100.00%
Democratic hold			
Democratic hold			

== District 29 ==
=== Democratic primary ===
- Eliana Pintor Marin, incumbent assemblymember
- Shanique Speight, incumbent assemblymember

==== Endorsements ====
Eliana Pintor Marin

U.S. representatives

- LaMonica McIver, U.S. representative from New Jersey's 10th congressional district (2024–present) (co-endorsement with Speight)

Labor unions

- LiUNA! New Jersey (co-endorsement with Speight)
- SEIU 32BJ (co-endorsement with Speight)
Shanique Speight

U.S. representatives

- LaMonica McIver, U.S. representative from New Jersey's 10th congressional district (2024–present) (co-endorsement with Pintor Marin)

Labor unions

- LiUNA! New Jersey (co-endorsement with Pintor Marin)
- SEIU 32BJ (co-endorsement with Pintor Marin)

==== Results ====
Democratic primary
Party	Candidate	Votes	%
Democratic	Shanique Speight (incumbent)	7,759	53.34%
Democratic	Eliana Pintor Marin (incumbent)	6,786	46.66%
Total votes		14,545	100.00%

=== Republican primary ===
==== Nominees ====
- Daniella Almeida
- Noble Milton, nominee for this district in 2023

==== Endorsements ====
Daniella Almeida

Political parties

- Essex County Republican Committee (co-endorsement with Milton)
Noble Milton

Political parties

- Essex County Republican Committee (co-endorsement with Almeida)

==== Results ====
Republican primary
Party	Candidate	Votes	%
Republican	Daniella Almeida	583	55.21%
Republican	Noble Milton	473	44.79%
Total votes		1,056	100.00%

=== General election ===
==== Predictions ====
Source	Seat	Ranking	As of
State Navigate	Seat 1	Solid D	October 1, 2025
State Navigate	Seat 2	Solid D	October 1, 2025

==== Results ====
29th legislative district general election, 2025
Party	Candidate	Votes	%
Democratic	Eliana Pintor Marin (incumbent)	24,742	42.4%
Democratic	Shanique Speight (incumbent)	24,584	42.1%
Republican	Daniella Almeida	4,678	8.0%
Republican	Noble Milton	4,401	7.5%
Total votes		58,405	100.0%
Democratic hold			
Democratic hold			

== District 30 ==
=== Republican primary ===
- Sean T. Kean, incumbent assemblymember
- Ned Thomson, former assemblymember (2017–2024)

==== Results ====
Republican primary
Party	Candidate	Votes	%
Republican	Sean T. Kean (incumbent)	13,790	55.30%
Republican	Ned Thomson	11,146	44.70%
Total votes		24,936	100.00%

=== Democratic primary ===
==== Nominees ====
- Joanne DeBenedicts, retired teacher
- Avi Schnall, incumbent assemblymember

==== Withdrawn ====
- Claire Deicke, former Belmar councilmember (withdrew after primary election)

==== Endorsements ====
Avi Schnall

Political parties

- Monmouth County Democratic Party

Labor unions

- LiUNA! New Jersey

Organizations

- Lakewood Vaad

==== Results ====
Democratic primary
Party	Candidate	Votes	%
Democratic	Avi Schnall (incumbent)	9,831	57.87%
Democratic	Claire Deicke	7,158	42.13%
Total votes		16,989	100.00%

=== General election ===
==== Predictions ====
Source	Seat	Ranking	As of
State Navigate	Seat 1	Solid R	October 1, 2025
State Navigate	Seat 2	Solid D	October 1, 2025

==== Results ====
30th legislative district general election, 2025
Party	Candidate	Votes	%
Republican	Sean T. Kean (incumbent)	49,860	31.4%
Democratic	Avi Schnall (incumbent)	48,094	30.3%
Republican	Ned Thomson	40,919	25.8%
Democratic	Joanne DeBenedictis	19,672	12.4%
Total votes		158,545	100.0%
Republican hold			
Democratic hold			

== District 31 ==
=== Democratic primary ===
==== Nominees ====
- William Sampson, incumbent assemblymember
- Jerry Walker, Hudson County commissioner from the 3rd district (2018–present), candidate for mayor of Jersey City in 2013, and candidate for New Jersey's 10th congressional district in 2024

==== Eliminated in primary ====
- Barbara McCann Stamato, incumbent assemblymember
- Jacqueline Weimmer, Bayonne councilmember

==== Endorsements ====
William Sampson

U.S. representatives

- LaMonica McIver, U.S. representative from New Jersey's 10th congressional district (2024–present) (co-endorsement with Walker)

Statewide officials

- Phil Murphy, governor of New Jersey (2018–present) (co-endorsement with Walker)

Political parties

- Hudson County Democratic Committee (co-endorsement with Walker)

Labor unions

- LiUNA! New Jersey (co-endorsement with Walker)
- SEIU 32BJ (co-endorsement with Walker)
Barbara McCann Stamato

Local officials

- Steven Fulop, mayor of Jersey City (2013–present) (co-endorsement with Weimmer)

Labor unions

- Communications Workers of America District 1

Organizations

- CAIR Action NJ (co-endorsement with Weimmer)
- Good Government Coalition of New Jersey
- New Jersey League of Conservation Voters
- Working Families Party
Jerry Walker

U.S. representatives

- LaMonica McIver, U.S. representative from New Jersey's 10th congressional district (2024–present) (co-endorsement with Sampson)

Statewide officials

- Phil Murphy, governor of New Jersey (2018–present) (co-endorsement with Sampson)

Political parties

- Hudson County Democratic Committee (co-endorsement with Sampson)

Labor unions

- LiUNA! New Jersey (co-endorsement with Sampson)
- SEIU 32BJ (co-endorsement with Sampson)
Jacqueline Weimmer

Local officials

- Steven Fulop, mayor of Jersey City (2013–present) (co-endorsement with McCann Stamato)

Organizations

- CAIR Action NJ (co-endorsement with McCann Stamato)
- Good Government Coalition of New Jersey
Declined to endorse

U.S. representatives

- Rob Menendez, U.S. representative from New Jersey's 8th congressional district (2023–present)

==== Results ====
Democratic primary
Party	Candidate	Votes	%
Democratic	Jerry Walker	9,067	28.77%
Democratic	William Sampson (incumbent)	7,708	24.45%
Democratic	Barbara McCann Stamato (incumbent)	7,480	23.72%
Democratic	Jacqueline Weimmer	7,274	23.07%
Total votes		31,529	100.00%

=== Republican primary ===
==== Nominees ====
- Anthony Acosta, realtor
- Neil Schulman, nominee for the 31st Senate district in 2021

==== Results ====
Republican primary
Party	Candidate	Votes	%
Republican	Anthony Acosta	2,520	58.12%
Republican	Neil Schulman	1,816	41.88%
Total votes		4,336	100.00%

=== General election ===
==== Predictions ====
Source	Seat	Ranking	As of
State Navigate	Seat 1	Solid D	October 1, 2025
State Navigate	Seat 2	Solid D	October 1, 2025

==== Results ====
31st legislative district general election, 2025
Party	Candidate	Votes	%
Democratic	Jerry Walker	33,937	37.5%
Democratic	William Sampson (incumbent)	32,516	35.9%
Republican	Anthony Acosta	12,340	13.6%
Republican	Neil Schulman	11,786	13.0%
Total votes		90,579	100.0%
Democratic hold			
Democratic hold			

== District 32 ==
=== Democratic primary ===
==== Nominees ====
- Ravinder Bhalla, mayor of Hoboken (2018–present), candidate for the 33rd district in 2011 and 2013, and candidate for New Jersey's 8th congressional district in 2024
- Katie Brennan, former chief of staff for the New Jersey Housing and Mortgage Finance Agency

==== Eliminated in primary ====
- Crystal Fonseca, former Newark Board of Education member
- Jenny Pu, director of the Hoboken Public Library
- Jessica Ramirez, incumbent assemblymember
- Yousef Saleh, Jersey City councilmember from Ward D

==== Declined ====
- John Allen, incumbent assemblymember (endorsed Bhalla)
- Barbara Reyes, Hoboken Housing Authority board chair (endorsed Fonseca and Pu)

==== Endorsements ====
Ravinder Bhalla

State legislators

- John Allen, state assemblymember from the 32nd district (2024–present)

Local officials

- David Roberts, former mayor of Hoboken (2001–2009) (co-endorsement with Brennan)

Labor unions

- ~~Hoboken Police Benevolent Association (co-endorsement with Brennan)~~ (endorsement revoked by the New Jersey State Police Benevolent Association)
- Hoboken Police Superior Officers Association (co-endorsement with Brennan)
- SEIU 32BJ (co-endorsement with Ramirez)

Organizations

- Food & Water Action (co-endorsement with Brennan)
- Good Government Coalition of New Jersey
- New Jersey League of Conservation Voters (co-endorsement with Ramirez)
Katie Brennan

Local officials

- Ravinder Bhalla, mayor of Hoboken (2018–present)
- David Roberts, former mayor of Hoboken (2001–2009) (co-endorsement with Bhalla)

Labor unions

- ~~Hoboken Police Benevolent Association (co-endorsement with Bhalla)~~ (endorsement revoked by the New Jersey State Police Benevolent Association)
- Hoboken Police Superior Officers Association (co-endorsement with Bhalla)

Organizations

- CAIR Action NJ (co-endorsement with Ramirez and Saleh)
- Food & Water Action (co-endorsement with Bhalla)
- Good Government Coalition of New Jersey
- Run for Something
- Working Families Party
Crystal Fonseca

State legislators

- Raj Mukherji, state senator from the 32nd district (2024–present) (co-endorsement with Pu)

Local officials

- Craig Guy, Hudson County executive (2024–present) and Hudson County Democratic chair (co-endorsement with Pu)

Political parties

- Hudson County Democratic Committee (co-endorsement with Pu)

Labor unions

- LiUNA! New Jersey (co-endorsement with Pu)

Organizations

- National Organization for Women New Jersey (co-endorsement with Pu)
Jenny Pu

State legislators

- Raj Mukherji, state senator from the 32nd district (2024–present) (co-endorsement with Fonseca)

Local officials

- Craig Guy, Hudson County executive (2024–present) and Hudson County Democratic chair (co-endorsement with Fonseca)

Political parties

- Hudson County Democratic Committee (co-endorsement with Fonseca)

Labor unions

- LiUNA! New Jersey (co-endorsement with Fonseca)

Organizations

- National Organization for Women New Jersey (co-endorsement with Fonseca)
Jessica Ramirez

Local officials

- Steven Fulop, mayor of Jersey City (2013–present) (co-endorsement with Saleh)

Labor unions

- SEIU 32BJ (co-endorsement with Bhalla)

Organizations

- CAIR Action NJ (co-endorsement with Brennan and Saleh)
- Good Government Coalition of New Jersey
- New Jersey League of Conservation Voters (co-endorsement with Bhalla)
Yousef Saleh

Local officials

- Steven Fulop, mayor of Jersey City (2013–present) (co-endorsement with Ramirez, previously endorsed Allen)

Organizations

- CAIR Action NJ (co-endorsement with Brennan and Ramirez)
- Good Government Coalition of New Jersey
Josh Allen (declined)

Local officials

- ~~Steven Fulop, mayor of Jersey City (2013–present)~~ (switched endorsement to Saleh after Allen declined)
Declined to endorse

U.S. representatives

- Rob Menendez, U.S. representative from New Jersey's 8th congressional district (2023–present)

Labor unions

- Communications Workers of America District 1

==== Results ====
Democratic primary
Party	Candidate	Votes	%
Democratic	Katie Brennan	7,545	19.62%
Democratic	Ravinder Bhalla	7,241	18.83%
Democratic	Jessica Ramirez (incumbent)	7,008	18.22%
Democratic	Jenny Pu	5,652	14.70%
Democratic	Yousef Saleh	5,608	14.58%
Democratic	Crystal Fonseca	5,406	14.06%
Total votes		38,460	100.00%

=== Republican primary ===
==== Nominees ====
- Stephen Bishop
- Kaushal Patel

==== Results ====
Republican primary
Party	Candidate	Votes	%
Republican	Stephen Bishop	1,882	58.52%
Republican	Kaushal Patel	1,334	41.48%
Total votes		3,216	100.00%

=== General election ===
==== Predictions ====
Source	Seat	Ranking	As of
State Navigate	Seat 1	Solid D	October 1, 2025
State Navigate	Seat 2	Solid D	October 1, 2025

==== Results ====
32nd legislative district general election, 2025
Party	Candidate	Votes	%
Democratic	Katie Brennan	37,932	39.1%
Democratic	Ravinder Bhalla	36,306	37.4%
Republican	Stephen Bishop	11,462	11.8%
Republican	Kaushal Patel	11,350	11.7%
Total votes		97,050	100.0%
Democratic hold			
Democratic hold			

== District 33 ==
=== Democratic primary ===
==== Nominees ====
- Gabe Rodriguez, incumbent assemblymember
- Larry Wainstein, businessman and perennial candidate

==== Eliminated in primary ====
- Frank Alonso, former Union City Republican chair
- Tony Hector, former North Bergen school board member

==== Withdrawn ====
- Julio Marenco, incumbent assemblymember

==== Declined ====
- Cosmo Cirillo, former West New York commissioner
- Angelica M. Jimenez, former assemblymember (2012–2024)

==== Endorsements ====
Frank Alonso

State legislators

- Nicholas Sacco, mayor of North Bergen (1991–present) and former state senator from the 32rd district (1994–2024) (co-endorsement with Hector; previously endorsed Marenco)

Local officials

- Steven Fulop, mayor of Jersey City (2013–present) (co-endorsement with Hector; previously endorsed Marenco)
Tony Hector

State legislators

- Nicholas Sacco, mayor of North Bergen (1991–present) and former state senator from the 32rd district (1994–2024) (co-endorsement with Alonso; previously endorsed Marenco)

Local officials

- Steven Fulop, mayor of Jersey City (2013–present) (co-endorsement with Alonso; previously endorsed Marenco)
Julio Marenco (withdrawn)

State legislators

- ~~Nicholas Sacco, mayor of North Bergen (1991–present) and former state senator from the 32rd district (1994–2024)~~ (switched endorsement to Alonso and Hector after Marenco withdrew)

Local officials

- ~~Steven Fulop, mayor of Jersey City (2013–present)~~ (switched endorsement to Alonso and Hector after Marenco withdrew)
Gabe Rodriguez

U.S. representatives

- Rob Menendez, U.S. representative from New Jersey's 8th congressional district (2023–present) (co-endorsement with Wainstein)
- Albio Sires, mayor of West New York (1995–2006; 2023–present) and former U.S. representative from New Jersey's 8th congressional district (2006–2023) (co-endorsement with Wainstein)

Statewide officials

- Phil Murphy, governor of New Jersey (2018–present) (co-endorsement with Wainstein)

State legislators

- Brian P. Stack, state senator from the 33rd district (2008–present) and mayor of Union City (2000–present) (co-endorsement with Wainstein)

Local officials

- Craig Guy, Hudson County executive (2024–present) and Hudson County Democratic chair (co-endorsement with Wainstein)
- Richard Turner, mayor of Weehawken (co-endorsement with Wainstein)
- 2 Hudson County commissioners (co-endorsement with Wainstein)

Labor unions

- Communications Workers of America District 1
- SEIU 32BJ
Larry Wainstein

U.S. representatives

- Rob Menendez, U.S. representative from New Jersey's 8th congressional district (2023–present) (co-endorsement with Rodriguez)
- Albio Sires, mayor of West New York (1995–2006; 2023–present) and former U.S. representative from New Jersey's 8th congressional district (2006–2023) (co-endorsement with Rodriguez)

Statewide officials

- Phil Murphy, governor of New Jersey (2018–present) (co-endorsement with Rodriguez)

State legislators

- Brian P. Stack, state senator from the 33rd district (2008–present) and mayor of Union City (2000–present) (co-endorsement with Rodriguez)

Local officials

- Craig Guy, Hudson County executive (2024–present) and Hudson County Democratic chair (co-endorsement with Rodriguez)
- Richard Turner, mayor of Weehawken (co-endorsement with Rodriguez)
- 2 Hudson County commissioners (co-endorsement with Rodriguez)

Labor unions

- LiUNA! New Jersey

==== Results ====
Democratic primary
Party	Candidate	Votes	%
Democratic	Gabe Rodriguez (incumbent)	18,503	37.10%
Democratic	Larry Wainstein	16,218	32.52%
Democratic	Tony Hector	7,648	15.34%
Democratic	Frank Alonso	7,500	15.04%
Total votes		49,869	100.00%

=== Republican primary ===
==== Nominees ====
- Cynthia DePice, teacher
- Anthony Valdes, nominee for New Jersey's 8th congressional district in 2024

==== Results ====
Republican primary
Party	Candidate	Votes	%
Republican	Anthony Valdes	2,599	59.32%
Republican	Cynthia DePice	1,782	40.68%
Total votes		4,381	100.00%

=== General election ===
==== Predictions ====
Source	Seat	Ranking	As of
State Navigate	Seat 1	Solid D	October 1, 2025
State Navigate	Seat 2	Solid D	October 1, 2025

==== Results ====
33rd legislative district general election, 2025
Party	Candidate	Votes	%
Democratic	Gabe Rodriguez (incumbent)	39,731	38.1%
Democratic	Larry Wainstein	38,926	37.3%
Republican	Cynthia DePice	12,903	12.4%
Republican	Anthony Valdes	12,797	12.3%
Total votes		104,357	100.0%
Democratic hold			
Democratic hold			

== District 34 ==
=== Democratic primary ===
==== Nominees ====
- Carmen Morales, incumbent assemblymember
- Michael Venezia, incumbent assemblymember

==== Eliminated in primary ====
- Brittany Claybrooks, former East Orange councilwoman and candidate for New Jersey's 10th congressional district in the 2024 special election
- Frank Vélez III, Belleville councilmember

==== Endorsements ====
Brittany Claybrooks

Local officials

- Steven Fulop, mayor of Jersey City (2013–present) (co-endorsement with Vélez)
Carmen Morales

U.S. representatives

- LaMonica McIver, U.S. representative from New Jersey's 10th congressional district (2024–present) (co-endorsement with Venezia)

Statewide officials

- Phil Murphy, governor of New Jersey (2018–present) (co-endorsement with Venezia)

Labor unions

- Communications Workers of America District 1 (co-endorsement with Venezia)
- LiUNA! New Jersey (co-endorsement with Venezia)
- New Jersey Education Association (co-endorsement with Venezia)
- SEIU 32BJ (co-endorsement with Venezia)

Organizations

- CAIR Action NJ (co-endorsement with Venezia)
- New Jersey League of Conservation Voters (co-endorsement with Venezia)
Frank Vélez III

Local officials

- Steven Fulop, mayor of Jersey City (2013–present) (co-endorsement with Claybrooks)
Michael Venezia

U.S. representatives

- LaMonica McIver, U.S. representative from New Jersey's 10th congressional district (2024–present) (co-endorsement with Morales)

Statewide officials

- Phil Murphy, governor of New Jersey (2018–present) (co-endorsement with Morales)

Labor unions

- Communications Workers of America District 1 (co-endorsement with Morales)
- LiUNA! New Jersey (co-endorsement with Morales)
- New Jersey Education Association (co-endorsement with Morales)
- SEIU 32BJ (co-endorsement with Morales)

Organizations

- CAIR Action NJ (co-endorsement with Morales)
- New Jersey League of Conservation Voters (co-endorsement with Morales)

==== Results ====
Democratic primary
Party	Candidate	Votes	%
Democratic	Carmen Morales (incumbent)	13,108	33.56%
Democratic	Michael Venezia (incumbent)	10,362	26.53%
Democratic	Brittany Claybrooks	9,498	24.32%
Democratic	Frank Vélez III	6,091	15.59%
Total votes		39,059	100.00%

=== Republican primary ===
==== Nominees ====
- Demtrius Eley, activist
- Lorenzo Marchese, chiropractor

==== Endorsements ====
Demtrius Eley

Political parties

- Essex County Republican Committee (co-endorsement with Marchese)
Lorenzo Marchese

Political parties

- Essex County Republican Committee (co-endorsement with Eley)

==== Results ====
Republican primary
Party	Candidate	Votes	%
Republican	Lorenzo Marchese	2,821	60.69%
Republican	Demtrius Eley	1,827	39.31%
Total votes		4,648	100.00%

=== General election ===
==== Predictions ====
Source	Seat	Ranking	As of
State Navigate	Seat 1	Solid D	October 1, 2025
State Navigate	Seat 2	Solid D	October 1, 2025

==== Results ====
34th legislative district general election, 2025
Party	Candidate	Votes	%
Democratic	Carmen Morales (incumbent)	49,411	39.5%
Democratic	Michael Venezia (incumbent)	48,161	38.5%
Republican	Lorenzo Marchese	14,063	11.3%
Republican	Demtrius Eley	13,315	10.7%
Total votes		124,950	100.0%
Democratic hold			
Democratic hold			

== District 35 ==
=== Special replacement convention ===
Incumbent Assemblymember Benjie Wimberly resigned after being appointed to the New Jersey Senate to fill the vacant seat previously occupied by Nellie Pou. Under the state constitution, vacancies must be filled within 35 days by the members of the county committee of the political party that the outgoing member was a part of. On January 16, 2025, Paterson City Councilmember Al Abdelaziz defeated Prospect Park Mayor Mohamed Khairullah to fill the vacancy.

==== Declared ====
- Al Abdelaziz, Paterson city councilmember and Paterson Democratic municipal co-chair
- Mohamed Khairullah, mayor of Prospect Park and candidate for New Jersey's 9th congressional district in 2024

==== Withdrawn ====
- Kenneth Simmons, Paterson School Board vice president
- Derya Taskin, deputy mayor of Paterson

==== Convention results ====
Special replacement convention
Party	Candidate	Votes	%
Democratic	Al Abdelaziz	128	80.5%
Democratic	Mohamed Khairullah	31	19.5%
Total votes		159	100.0%

=== Democratic primary ===
==== Nominees ====
- Al Abdelaziz, incumbent assemblymember
- Kenyatta Stewart, attorney

==== Eliminated in primary ====
- Orlando Cruz, Passaic County commissioner
- Romi Herrara, former Garfield councilmember

==== Withdrawn ====
- Christian Khalil, social worker and Green Party nominee for U.S. Senate in 2024

==== Declined ====
- Shavonda E. Sumter, incumbent assemblymember

==== Endorsements ====
Al Abdelaziz

Statewide officials

- Phil Murphy, governor of New Jersey (2018–present) (co-endorsement with Cruz)

State legislators

- Benjie Wimberly, state senator from the 35th district (2025–present) (co-endorsement with Cruz)

Local officials

- Orlando Cruz, Passaic County commissioner
- Andre Sayegh, mayor of Paterson (2018–present) (co-endorsement with Cruz)
- 2 other mayors (co-endorsement with Cruz)

Party chapters

- 2 Democratic municipal clubs (co-endorsement with Cruz)

Political parties

- Passaic County Democratic Committee (co-endorsement with Cruz)

Labor unions

- Communications Workers of America District 1
- LiUNA! New Jersey (co-endorsement with Cruz)
- New Jersey Education Association (co-endorsement with Cruz)
- SEIU 32BJ (co-endorsement with Cruz)

Organizations

- CAIR Action NJ
- Working Families Party
Orlando Cruz

Statewide officials

- Phil Murphy, governor of New Jersey (2018–present) (co-endorsement with Abdelaziz)

State legislators

- Al Abdelaziz, state assemblymember from the 35th district (2025–present)
- Benjie Wimberly, state senator from the 35th district (2025–present) (co-endorsement with Abdelaziz)

Local officials

- Andre Sayegh, mayor of Paterson (2018–present) (co-endorsement with Abdelaziz)
- 2 other mayors (co-endorsement with Abdelaziz)

Party chapters

- 2 Democratic municipal clubs (co-endorsement with Abdelaziz)

Political parties

- Passaic County Democratic Committee (co-endorsement with Abdelaziz)

Labor unions

- LiUNA! New Jersey (co-endorsement with Abdelaziz)
- New Jersey Education Association (co-endorsement with Abdelaziz)
- SEIU 32BJ (co-endorsement with Abdelaziz)
Romi Herrara

Local officials

- Steven Fulop, mayor of Jersey City (2013–present)
Kenyatta Stewart

U.S. representatives

- LaMonica McIver, U.S. representative from New Jersey's 10th congressional district (2024–present)

Local officials

- Jeffery Jones, former mayor of Paterson (2010–2014)
- Joey Torres, former mayor of Paterson (2002–2010, 2014–2017)
- 2 Newark municipal councilmembers
Christian Khalil (withdrawn)

Local officials

- ~~Steven Fulop, mayor of Jersey City (2013–present)~~

==== Results ====
Democratic primary
Party	Candidate	Votes	%
Democratic	Kenyatta Stewart	7,679	33.04%
Democratic	Al Abdelaziz (incumbent)	6,391	27.50%
Democratic	Orlando Cruz	6,128	26.37%
Democratic	Romi Herrara	3,042	13.09%
Total votes		23,240	100.00%

=== Republican primary ===
==== Nominees ====
- Nelvin Mercado-Duran
- Rawell Perez-Muñoz

==== Eliminated in primary ====
- Andrew Tisellano

==== Results ====
Republican primary
Party	Candidate	Votes	%
Republican	Nelvin Mercado-Duran	1,939	41.79%
Republican	Rawell Perez-Muñoz	1,406	30.30%
Republican	Andrew Tisellano	1,295	27.91%
Total votes		4,640	100.00%

=== General election ===
==== Predictions ====
Source	Seat	Ranking	As of
State Navigate	Seat 1	Solid D	October 1, 2025
State Navigate	Seat 2	Solid D	October 1, 2025

==== Results ====
35th legislative district general election, 2025
Party	Candidate	Votes	%
Democratic	Kenyatta Stewart	31,068	36.4%
Democratic	Al Abdelaziz (incumbent)	30,777	36.1%
Republican	Nelvin Mercado-Duran	11,831	13.9%
Republican	Rawell Perez-Muñoz	11,581	13.6%
Total votes		85,257	100.0%
Democratic hold			
Democratic hold			

== District 36 ==
=== Democratic primary ===
==== Nominees ====
- Clinton Calabrese, incumbent assemblymember
- Gary Schaer, incumbent assemblymember

==== Endorsements ====
Clinton Calabrese

Labor unions

- LiUNA! New Jersey (co-endorsement with Schaer)
- SEIU 32BJ (co-endorsement with Schaer)
Gary Schaer

Labor unions

- LiUNA! New Jersey (co-endorsement with Calabrese)
- SEIU 32BJ (co-endorsement with Calabrese)

==== Results ====
Democratic primary
Party	Candidate	Votes	%
Democratic	Gary Schaer (incumbent)	10,557	50.26%
Democratic	Clinton Calabrese (incumbent)	10,449	49.74%
Total votes		21,006	100.00%

=== Republican primary ===
==== Nominees ====
- Diane DeBiase, Carlstadt councilmember
- Chris Musto, former Lyndhurst school board member

==== Eliminated in primary ====
- Chris Auriemma, veteran and nominee for the 36th Senate district in 2021 and 2023
- Craig Auriemma, veteran and nominee for this district in 2021 and 2023

==== Declined ====
- Joseph Viso, nominee for this district in 2021 and 2023

==== Endorsements ====
Chris Auriemma

Organizations

- Good Government Coalition of New Jersey

==== Results ====
Republican primary
Party	Candidate	Votes	%
Republican	Chris Musto	3,090	32.94%
Republican	Diane DeBiase	2,863	30.52%
Republican	Chris Auriemma	1,901	20.27%
Republican	Craig Auriemma	1,526	16.27%
Total votes		9,380	100.00%

=== General election ===
==== Predictions ====
Source	Seat	Ranking	As of
State Navigate	Seat 1	Likely D	October 1, 2025
State Navigate	Seat 2	Likely D	October 1, 2025

==== Results ====
36th legislative district general election, 2025
Party	Candidate	Votes	%
Democratic	Gary Schaer (incumbent)	34,434	30.8%
Democratic	Clinton Calabrese (incumbent)	33,959	30.3%
Republican	Chris Musto	22,328	19.9%
Republican	Diane DeBiase	21,205	18.9%
Total votes		111,926	100.0%
Democratic hold			
Democratic hold			

== District 37 ==
=== Democratic primary ===
==== Nominees ====
- Shama Haider, incumbent assemblymember
- Ellen Park, incumbent assemblymember

==== Eliminated in primary ====
- Rosemary Hernandez Carroll, realtor
- Daniel Park, Tenafly councilmember
- Yitz Stern, former deputy mayor of Teaneck
- Tamar Warburg, attorney

==== Endorsements ====
Rosemary Hernandez Carroll

Local officials

- Elie Katz, former mayor of Teaneck (2006–2008, 2016) (co-endorsement with Stern)
- Paul Ostrow, former mayor of Teaneck (1996–2002) (co-endorsement with Stern)
- Mark Schwartz, mayor of Teaneck (2025–present) (co-endorsement with Stern)

Individuals

- Daniel Fridman, rabbi (co-endorsement with Stern)
Shama Haider

State legislators

- Loretta Weinberg, former majority leader of the New Jersey Senate (2012–2022) from the 37th district (2005–2022) (co-endorsement with Ellen Park)

Local officials

- Mark Zinna, mayor of Tenafly (co-endorsement with Ellen Park)

Political parties

- Bergen County Democratic Committee (co-endorsement with Ellen Park)

Labor unions

- Communications Workers of America District 1 (co-endorsement with Ellen Park)
- LiUNA! New Jersey (co-endorsement with Ellen Park)
- SEIU 32BJ (co-endorsement with Ellen Park)

Organizations

- New Jersey League of Conservation Voters (co-endorsement with Ellen Park)
Daniel Park

Local officials

- Steven Fulop, mayor of Jersey City (2013–present) (co-endorsement with Warburg)

Organizations

- Good Government Coalition of New Jersey
- Working Families Party
Ellen Park

State legislators

- Loretta Weinberg, former majority leader of the New Jersey Senate (2012–2022) from the 37th district (2005–2022) (co-endorsement with Haider)

Local officials

- Mark Zinna, mayor of Tenafly (co-endorsement with Haider)

Political parties

- Bergen County Democratic Committee (co-endorsement with Haider)

Labor unions

- Communications Workers of America District 1 (co-endorsement with Haider)
- LiUNA! New Jersey (co-endorsement with Haider)
- SEIU 32BJ (co-endorsement with Haider)

Organizations

- New Jersey League of Conservation Voters (co-endorsement with Haider)
Yitz Stern

Local officials

- Elie Katz, former mayor of Teaneck (2006–2008, 2016) (co-endorsement with Carroll)
- Paul Ostrow, former mayor of Teaneck (1996–2002) (co-endorsement with Carroll)
- Mark Schwartz, mayor of Teaneck (2025–present) (co-endorsement with Carroll)

Individuals

- Daniel Fridman, rabbi (co-endorsement with Carroll)
Tamar Warburg

Local officials

- Steven Fulop, mayor of Jersey City (2013–present) (co-endorsement with Daniel Park)

Organizations

- Good Government Coalition of New Jersey

==== Results ====
Democratic primary
Party	Candidate	Votes	%
Democratic	Ellen Park (incumbent)	11,198	25.85%
Democratic	Shama Haider (incumbent)	9,647	22.27%
Democratic	Rosemary Hernandez Carroll	6,404	14.79%
Democratic	Emil "Yitz" Stern	6,247	14.42%
Democratic	Tamar Warburg	4,973	11.48%
Democratic	Daniel Park	4,846	11.19%
Total votes		43,315	100.00%

=== Republican primary ===
==== Nominees ====
- Andrew Meehan, teacher (previously ran for the Bergen County Board of Commissioners)
- Marco Navarro, EMT

==== Results ====
Republican primary
Party	Candidate	Votes	%
Republican	Marco Navarro	3,538	50.98%
Republican	Andrew Meehan	3,402	49.02%
Total votes		6,940	100.00%

=== General election ===
==== Predictions ====
Source	Seat	Ranking	As of
State Navigate	Seat 1	Solid D	October 1, 2025
State Navigate	Seat 2	Solid D	October 1, 2025

==== Results ====
37th legislative district general election, 2025
Party	Candidate	Votes	%
Democratic	Ellen Park (incumbent)	43,906	34.5%
Democratic	Shama Haider (incumbent)	42,781	33.6%
Republican	Marco Navarro	20,864	16.4%
Republican	Andrew Meehan	19,830	15.6%
Total votes		127,381	100.0%
Democratic hold			
Democratic hold			

== District 38 ==
=== Democratic primary ===
==== Nominees ====
- Lisa Swain, incumbent assemblymember
- Chris Tully, incumbent assemblymember

==== Eliminated in primary ====
- Donald Bonamo, attorney and South Hackensack zoning board member
- Damali Robinson, Glen Rock Board of Education president

==== Endorsements ====
Donald Bonamo

Local officials

- Steven Fulop, mayor of Jersey City (2013–present) (co-endorsement with Robinson)
Damali Robinson

Local officials

- Steven Fulop, mayor of Jersey City (2013–present) (co-endorsement with Bonamo)

Organizations

- Good Government Coalition of New Jersey
- Working Families Party
Lisa Swain

State legislators

- Joseph Lagana, state senator from the 38th district (2018–present) (co-endorsement with Tully)

Local officials

- 10 mayors (co-endorsement with Tully)

Party officials

- Paul Juliano, Bergen County Democratic chair (co-endorsement with Tully)

Labor unions

- Communications Workers of America District 1 (co-endorsement with Tully)
- LiUNA! New Jersey (co-endorsement with Tully)
- SEIU 32BJ (co-endorsement with Tully)

Organizations

- New Jersey League of Conservation Voters (co-endorsement with Tully)
Chris Tully

State legislators

- Joseph Lagana, state senator from the 38th district (2018–present) (co-endorsement with Swain)

Local officials

- 10 mayors (co-endorsement with Swain)

Party officials

- Paul Juliano, Bergen County Democratic chair (co-endorsement with Swain)

Labor unions

- Communications Workers of America District 1 (co-endorsement with Swain)
- LiUNA! New Jersey (co-endorsement with Swain)
- SEIU 32BJ (co-endorsement with Swain)

Organizations

- New Jersey League of Conservation Voters (co-endorsement with Swain)

==== Results ====
Democratic primary
Party	Candidate	Votes	%
Democratic	Lisa Swain (incumbent)	12,541	38.99%
Democratic	Chris Tully (incumbent)	10,732	33.37%
Democratic	Damali Robinson	5,512	17.14%
Democratic	Donald Bonamo	3,380	10.51%
Total votes		32,165	100.00%

=== Republican primary ===
==== Nominees ====
- Robert Kaiser, Paramus councilmember
- Barry Wilkes, businessman and nominee for this district in 2023

==== Eliminated in primary ====
- Jerry Taylor, nominee for this district in 2021

==== Withdrawn ====
- Paul Duggan, perennial candidate
- Trevor Ferrigno, independent candidate for New Jersey's 5th congressional district in 2022

==== Endorsements ====
Robert Kaiser

Political parties

- Bergen County Republican Committee (co-endorsement with Wilkes)
Barry Wilkes

Political parties

- Bergen County Republican Committee (co-endorsement with Kaiser)

==== Convention results ====
Bergen County Republican convention
Party	Candidate	Votes	%
Republican	Robert Kaiser	91	37.6%
Republican	Barry Wilkes	77	31.8%
Republican	Trevor Ferrigno	54	22.3%
Republican	Jerry Taylor	20	8.3%
Republican	Paul Duggan	0	0.0%
Total votes		242	100.0%

==== Primary results ====
Republican primary
Party	Candidate	Votes	%
Republican	Robert Kaiser	6,006	43.80%
Republican	Barry Wilkes	5,564	40.58%
Republican	Jerry Taylor	2,142	15.62%
Total votes		13,712	100.00%

=== General election ===
==== Predictions ====
Source	Seat	Ranking	As of
State Navigate	Seat 1	Likely D	October 1, 2025
State Navigate	Seat 2	Likely D	October 1, 2025

==== Results ====
38th legislative district general election, 2025
Party	Candidate	Votes	%
Democratic	Lisa Swain (incumbent)	45,688	29.3%
Democratic	Chris Tully (incumbent)	44,769	28.7%
Republican	Robert Kaiser	33,400	21.4%
Republican	Barry Wilkes	32,218	20.6%
Total votes		156,075	100.0%
Democratic hold			
Democratic hold			

== District 39 ==
=== Republican primary ===
==== Nominees ====
- Robert Auth, incumbent assemblymember
- John V. Azzariti, incumbent assemblymember

==== Eliminated in primary ====
- Frank Pallotta, former investment banker and nominee for New Jersey's 5th congressional district in 2020 and 2022

==== Withdrawn ====
- Ward Donigian, Mahwah councilmember (endorsed Auth and Azzariti)
- Jon Kurpis, Saddle River councilmember and Republican chair and candidate for this district in 2021 and 2023 (endorsed Auth and Azzariti)
- Carlos Rendo, mayor of Woodcliff Lake (2016–present) and nominee for lieutenant governor in 2017 (endorsed Auth and Azzariti)

==== Endorsements ====
Robert Auth

State legislators

- Holly Schepisi, state senator from the 39th district (2021–present) (co-endorsement with Azzariti)

Local officials

- Carlos Rendo, mayor of Woodcliff Lake (2016–present) (co-endorsement with Azzariti)

Party officials

- Jon Kurpis, Saddle River Republican chair (co-endorsement with Azzariti)
John V. Azzariti

State legislators

- Holly Schepisi, state senator from the 39th district (2021–present) (co-endorsement with Auth)

Local officials

- Carlos Rendo, mayor of Woodcliff Lake (2016–present) (co-endorsement with Auth)

Party officials

- Jon Kurpis, Saddle River Republican chair (co-endorsement with Auth)
Frank Pallota

Local officials

- James Wysocki, mayor of Mahwah
Declined to endorse

Local officials

- Tom Giordano, mayor of Waldwick
- ~~James Wysocki, mayor of Mahwah~~ (endorsed Pallota)

==== Results ====
Republican primary
Party	Candidate	Votes	%
Republican	John V. Azzariti (incumbent)	10,069	40.19%
Republican	Robert Auth (incumbent)	9,398	37.51%
Republican	Frank Pallotta	5,588	22.31%
Total votes		25,055	100.00%

=== Democratic primary ===
==== Nominees ====
- Donna Abene, former Woodcliff Lake councilmember and nominee for this district in 2013
- Andrew LaBruno, former mayor of Dumont

==== Eliminated in primary ====
- Damon Englese, former Dumont councilmember and nominee for this district in 2021
- David Jiang, Demarest councilmember

==== Endorsements ====
Donna Abene

Political parties

- Bergen County Democratic Committee (co-endorsement with Englese)

Organizations

- CAIR Action NJ
Damon Englese

Political parties

- Bergen County Democratic Committee (co-endorsement with Abene)
David Jiang

Local officials

- Steven Fulop, mayor of Jersey City (2013–present) (co-endorsement with LaBruno)

Organizations

- Good Government Coalition of New Jersey
Andrew LaBruno

Local officials

- Steven Fulop, mayor of Jersey City (2013–present) (co-endorsement with Jiang)

Labor unions

- International Association of Fire Fighters Local 1066
- Jersey City Police Officers Benevolent Association

Organizations

- Good Government Coalition of New Jersey

==== Results ====
Democratic primary
Party	Candidate	Votes	%
Democratic	Andrew LaBruno	9,137	28.51%
Democratic	Donna Abene	8,454	26.38%
Democratic	David Jiang	8,317	25.95%
Democratic	Damon Englese	6,137	19.15%
Total votes		32,045	100.00%

=== General election ===
==== Predictions ====
Source	Seat	Ranking	As of
State Navigate	Seat 1	Likely R	October 1, 2025
State Navigate	Seat 2	Likely R	October 1, 2025

==== Results ====
39th legislative district general election, 2025
Party	Candidate	Votes	%
Republican	Robert Auth (incumbent)	51,116	25.8%
Republican	John V. Azzariti (incumbent)	50,362	25.4%
Democratic	Andrew LaBruno	48,474	24.5%
Democratic	Donna Abene	48,238	24.3%
Total votes		198,190	100.0%
Republican hold			
Republican hold			

== District 40 ==
=== Republican primary ===
==== Nominees ====
- Al Barlas, incumbent assemblymember
- Christopher DePhillips, incumbent assemblymember

==== Endorsements ====
Al Barlas

State legislators

- Kristin Corrado, state senator from the 40th district (2017–present) (co-endorsement with DePhillips)

Local officials

- 10 mayors (co-endorsement with DePhillips)

Party officials

- County Republican chairs of Bergen and Passaic counties (co-endorsement with DePhillips)
- 15 Republican municipal chairs (co-endorsement with DePhillips)

Political parties

- Essex County Republican Committee (co-endorsement with DePhillips)

Labor unions

- LiUNA! New Jersey (co-endorsement with DePhillips)
Chris DePhillips

State legislators

- Kristin Corrado, state senator from the 40th district (2017–present) (co-endorsement with Barlas)

Local officials

- 10 mayors (co-endorsement with Barlas)

Party officials

- County Republican chairs of Bergen and Passaic counties (co-endorsement with Barlas)
- 14 Republican municipal chairs (co-endorsement with Barlas)

Political parties

- Essex County Republican Committee (co-endorsement with Barlas)

Labor unions

- LiUNA! New Jersey (co-endorsement with Barlas)

==== Results ====
Republican primary
Party	Candidate	Votes	%
Republican	Christopher DePhillips (incumbent)	13,757	54.66%
Republican	Al Barlas (incumbent)	11,411	45.34%
Total votes		25,168	100.00%

=== Democratic primary ===
==== Nominees ====
- Ron Arnau, former Woodland Park councilmember
- Jeff Gates, former president of the Caldwell Council

==== Endorsements ====
Ron Arnau

Local officials

- Steven Fulop, mayor of Jersey City (2013–present)

Organizations

- Good Government Coalition of New Jersey
Jeff Gates

Political parties

- Bergen County Democratic Committee
- Essex County Democratic Committee
- Passaic County Democratic Committee

==== Results ====
Democratic primary
Party	Candidate	Votes	%
Democratic	Jeff Gates	16,128	53.38%
Democratic	Ron Arnau	14,088	46.62%
Total votes		30,216	100.00%

=== General election ===
==== Predictions ====
Source	Seat	Ranking	As of
State Navigate	Seat 1	Solid R	October 1, 2025
State Navigate	Seat 2	Solid R	October 1, 2025

==== Results ====
40th legislative district general election, 2025
Party	Candidate	Votes	%
Republican	Christopher DePhillips (incumbent)	52,090	27.1%
Republican	Al Barlas (incumbent)	49,682	25.8%
Democratic	Jeff Gates	45,870	23.8%
Democratic	Ron Arnau	44,799	23.3%
Total votes		192,341	100.0%
Republican hold			
Republican hold			

== See also ==
- 2025 New Jersey gubernatorial election
