= Mitchelle Drulis =

American politician

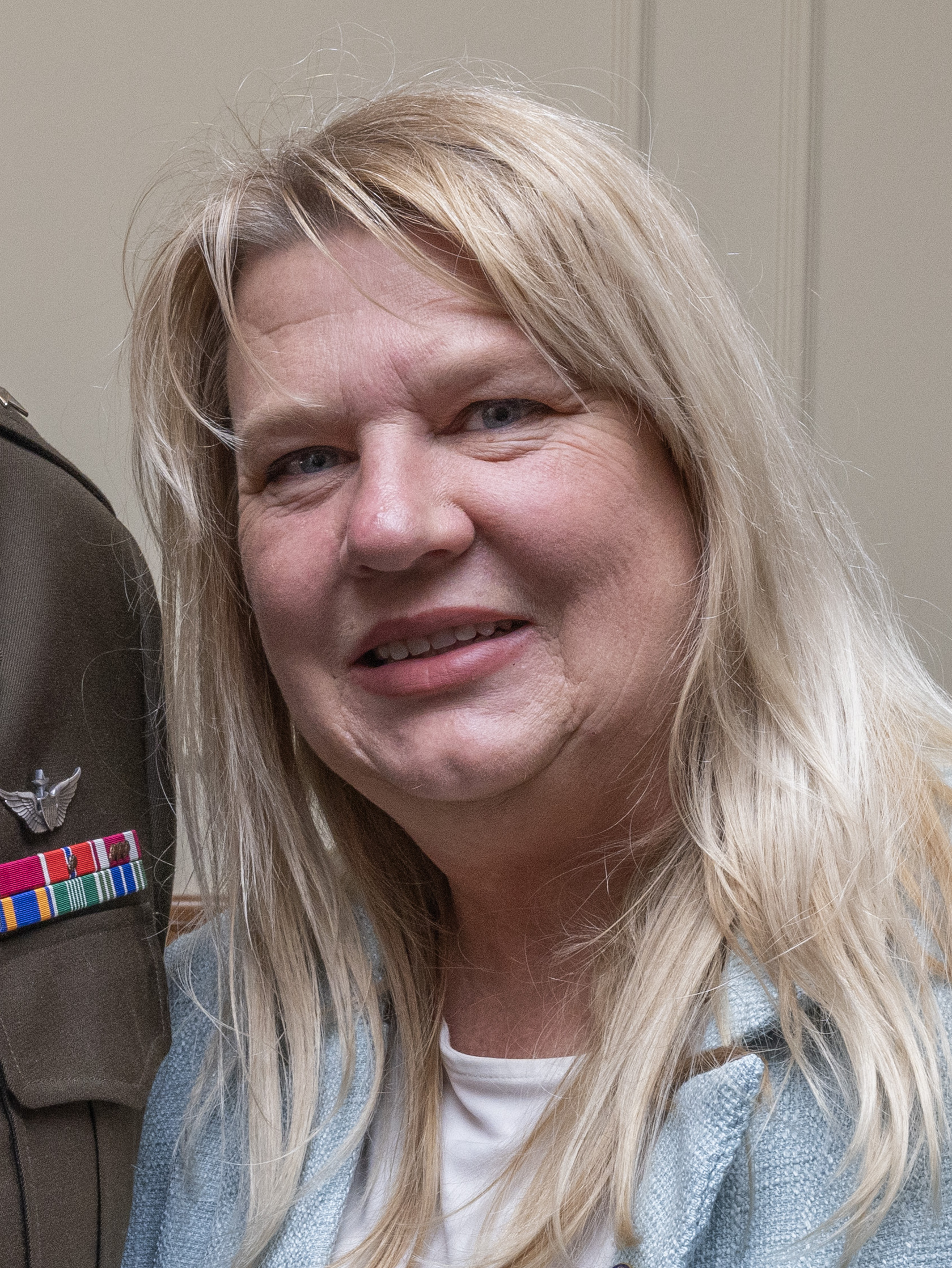
- Drulis in 2025

Member of the New Jersey General Assembly from the 16th district
- Incumbent
- Assumed office January 9, 2024 Serving with Roy Freiman
- Preceded by: Sadaf Jaffer

Personal details
- Party: Democratic
- Education: Rutgers University
- Website: Legislative webpage

Mitchelle Drulis is an American Democratic Party politician serving as a member of the New Jersey General Assembly for the 16th legislative district, having taken office on January 9, 2024.

== Biography ==
Mitchelle A. Everest attended Santana High School in Santee, California, and graduated from Rutgers University with a degree in political science. She has been a resident of Raritan Township, New Jersey, and has worked on the staff of politicians Bob Smith and Joseph V. Egan in the General Assembly.

In 2018, Drulis served as the political director for Tom Malinowski's congressional campaign. She then served as his district director in his office, where she developed and managed a constituent services program that assisted roughly 12,000 individual constituents across the district.

== New Jersey General Assembly ==
=== 2023 ===
Drulis and her incumbent running mate Roy Freiman defeated Republicans Ross Traphagen and Grace Zhang in the 2023 New Jersey General Assembly election.

=== 2025 ===
Drulis and Roy Freiman both won new terms in the 2025 election, by one of their largest margins yet, beating Republican candidates Catherine Payne and Scott Sipos by more than 17,000 votes each.

=== Tenure ===
Drulis was sworn in January 9, 2024, becoming the first Democrat from Hunterdon County to be elected to the State Legislature in more than 40 years.

=== District 16 ===
Each of the 40 districts in the New Jersey Legislature has one representative in the New Jersey Senate and two members in the New Jersey General Assembly. The representatives from the 16th District for the 2024—2025 Legislative Session are:

- Senator Andrew Zwicker (D)
- Assemblywoman Mitchelle Drulis (D)
- Assemblyman Roy Freiman (D)

== Electoral history ==
=== Assembly ===
16th Legislative District General Election, 2025
Party	Candidate	Votes	%
Democratic	Roy Freiman (incumbent)	56,476	29.9
Democratic	Mitchelle Drulis (incumbent)	55,773	29.6
Republican	Catherine Payne	38,344	20.3
Republican	Scott Sipos	38,128	20.2
Total votes		120,663	100.0
Democratic hold			
Democratic hold			

16th Legislative District General Election, 2023
Party	Candidate	Votes	%
Democratic	Roy Freiman (incumbent)	34,188	28.3
Democratic	Mitchelle Drulis	33,642	27.9
Republican	Grace Zhang	26,558	22.0
Republican	Ross Traphagen	26,293	21.8
Total votes		120,663	100.0
Democratic hold			
Democratic hold			
