= Al Abdelaziz =

New Jersey politician

Member of the New Jersey General Assembly from the 35th district
- Incumbent
- Assumed office January 23, 2025 Serving with Kenyatta Stewart
- Preceded by: Benjie Wimberly

Personal details
- Party: Democratic
- Education: William Paterson University (BS); University of Scranton (MS)
- Website: Legislative webpage

Alaa Abdelaziz is an American Democratic Party politician who represents the 35th Legislative District in the New Jersey General Assembly since January 2025. Abdelaziz was selected to fill the vacancy following Benjie Wimberly's resignation to join the New Jersey Senate in 2025. He previously served on the Paterson City Council.

== Political career ==
=== Paterson City Council ===
In 2022, Councilman Abdelaziz sponsored a resolution renaming part of Paterson's Main Street as Palestine Way.

=== New Jersey General Assembly ===
Abdelaziz was selected in a special election convention to fill the vacancy following Benjie Wimberly's resignation, defeating Prospect Park mayor Mohamed Khairullah with 128 to 31 delegate votes. He is the first Palestinian American to serve in the chamber.

Abdelaziz serves in the Assembly on the Education; Higher Education; and Housing committees.

== Electoral history ==
Special replacement convention
Party	Candidate	Votes	%
Democratic	Al Abdelaziz	128	80.5%
Democratic	Mohamed Khairullah	31	19.5%
Total votes		159	100.0%

2025 New Jersey General Assembly election Democratic primary election
Party	Candidate	Votes	%
Democratic	Kenyatta Stewart	7,679	33.04%
Democratic	Al Abdelaziz (incumbent)	6,391	27.50%
Democratic	Orlando Cruz	6,128	26.37%
Democratic	Romi Herrara	3,042	13.09%
Total votes		23,240	100.00%

35th legislative district general election, 2025
Party	Candidate	Votes	%
Democratic	Kenyatta Stewart	31,068	36.4%
Democratic	Al Abdelaziz (incumbent)	30,777	36.1%
Republican	Nelvin Mercado-Duran	11,831	13.9%
Republican	Rawell Perez-Muñoz	11,581	13.6%
Total votes		85,257	100.0%
Democratic hold			
Democratic hold			
