= Daniel Fridman (rabbi) =

American rabbi

Rabbi Daniel Fridman
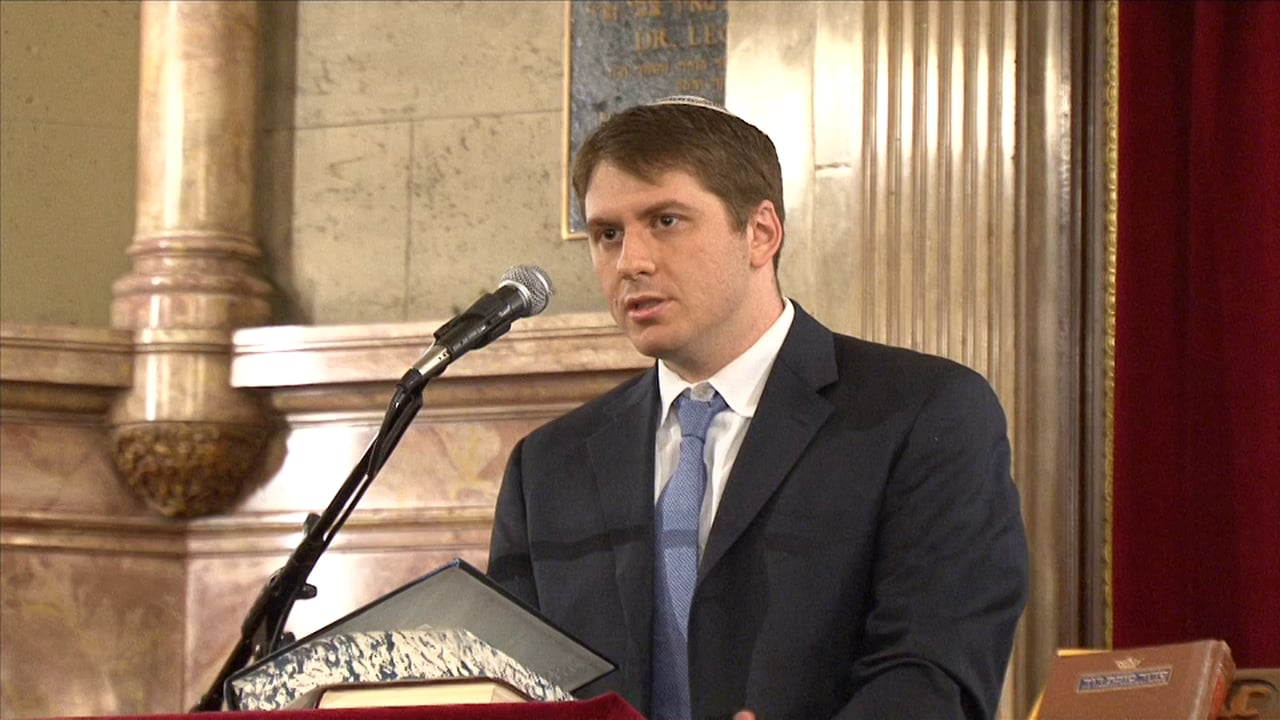
- Title: S'gan Rosh Yeshiva of TABC, Rabbi of Jewish Center of Teaneck

Personal life
- Born: Daniel Fridman
- Spouse: Chaya Fridman
- Children: Eliana, Yosef Reuven (Joey), David
- Parent(s): Mort Fridman and Esther Fridman
- Education: Yavneh Academy (New Jersey), The Frisch School, Yeshivat Har Etzion, Columbia University, Rabbi Isaac Elchanan Theological Seminary
- Occupation: Rabbi

Religious life
- Religion: Judaism
- Denomination: Orthodox Judaism

Jewish leader
- Position: Rabbi
- Synagogue: Jewish Center of Teaneck
- Yeshiva: Torah Academy of Bergen County
- Residence: Teaneck, New Jersey
- Semikhah: Rabbi Isaac Elchanan Theological Seminary

Daniel Fridman is an American Orthodox rabbi who is the S'gan (Deputy) Rosh Yeshiva of TABC and the Rabbi of the Jewish Center of Teaneck.

== Biography ==
Fridman grew up in Teaneck, New Jersey, where he attended Yavneh Academy for elementary school. Following Yavneh Academy, he learned at the Frisch School, graduating in 2002. After high school, he studied Talmud at Yeshivat Har Etzion, then went to Columbia University where he majored in Biological Sciences. Rabbi Daniel Fridman was a Talmid of Rabbi Michael Rosensweig at RIETS. Before living in Teaneck, Rabbi Fridman lived on the Upper West Side of New York City, where he served as the resident scholar of the Jewish Center of Manhattan. He also teaches at Lamdeinu, a learning program for adults based in Teaneck's Congregation Beth Aaron. He is planning to complete Yadin Yadin Semicha at RIETS and a Master’s Degree in Jewish Philosophy at the Bernard Revel Graduate School of Jewish Studies at YU.

== Early life ==
Fridman was born in the Bronx; his parents, Drs. Esther and Morton Fridman, both psychiatrists, were residents at the Albert Einstein College of Medicine there. In 1988, his parents moved their young family — Daniel was 3, and his older brother, Ari, was 4 — to Teaneck.

== Personal ==
Fridman was raised in Teaneck, NJ, as was his wife, Dr. Chaya Gopin, who is an Assistant Clinical Professor of Neuropsychology at Weill Cornell Medical College. Daniel and Chaya have a daughter Eliana and two sons; Yosef Reuven (Joey) David and Benji.
