= Camden County Board of County Commissioners =

Governing body in Camden County, New Jersey, US

Leadership
- Director: Louis Cappelli, Jr. (D)
- Deputy Director: Edward McDonnell (D)

Structure
- Seats: 7
- Political groups: Democratic Party (7)
- Length of term: 3 years

Website
- Camden County Board of Commissioners

The Camden County Board of County Commissioners is a board of seven people who govern Camden County, New Jersey. The board is led by the director and deputy director, who are chosen by the board every year. The current director is Commissioner Louis Cappelli, Jr., and the current deputy director is Edward McDonnell.

== Responsibilities ==
The board is responsible for governing the county. The board also writes, approves, and executes the county's legislation.

== Sessions ==
=== 2019 ===
On March 22, Commissioner William Moen resigned so he could run for New Jersey General Assembly in the 5th Legislative District. He was replaced by Melinda Kane.

=== Previous Sessions ===
Year	Seat 1	Seat 2	Seat 3	Seat 4	Seat 5	Seat 6	Seat 7
2017	Louis Cappelli, Jr. (D)	Edward McDonnell (D)	William Moen (D)	Susan Shin Angulo (D)	Carmen Rodriguez (D)	Jeffery Nash (D)	Jonathan Young (D)
2018	Louis Cappelli, Jr. (D)	Edward McDonnell (D)	William Moen (D)	Susan Shin Angulo (D)	Carmen Rodriguez (D)	Jeffery Nash (D)	Jonathan Young (D)
2019	Louis Cappelli, Jr. (D)	Edward McDonnell (D)	William Moen (D)	Susan Shin Angulo (D)	Carmen Rodriguez (D)	Jeffery Nash (D)	Jonathan Young (D)
2019	Louis Cappelli, Jr. (D)	Edward McDonnell (D)	Melinda Kane (D)	Susan Shin Angulo (D)	Carmen Rodriguez (D)	Jeffery Nash (D)	Jonathan Young (D)
2020	Louis Cappelli, Jr. (D)	Edward McDonnell (D)	Melinda Kane (D)	Susan Shin Angulo (D)	Carmen Rodriguez (D)	Jeffery Nash (D)	Jonathan Young (D)
2021	Louis Cappelli, Jr. (D)	Edward McDonnell (D)	Melinda Kane (D)	Almar Dyer (D)	Carmen Rodriguez (D)	Jeffery Nash (D)	Jonathan Young (D)
2022	Louis Cappelli, Jr. (D)	Edward McDonnell (D)	Melinda Kane (D)	Almar Dyer (D)	Virginia Betteridge (D)	Jeffery Nash (D)	Jonathan Young (D)
2023	Louis Cappelli, Jr. (D)	Edward McDonnell (D)	Melinda Kane (D)	Almar Dyer (D)	Virginia Betteridge (D)	Jeffery Nash (D)	Jonathan Young (D)
2024	Louis Cappelli, Jr. (D)	Edward McDonnell (D)	Melinda Kane (D)	Almar Dyer (D)	Virginia Betteridge (D)	Jeffery Nash (D)	Jonathan Young (D)
2025	Louis Cappelli, Jr. (D)	Edward McDonnell (D)	Melinda Kane (D)	Almar Dyer (D)	Virginia Betteridge (D)	Jeffery Nash (D)	Jonathan Young (D)
