= Kenyatta Stewart =

American politician

Member of the New Jersey General Assembly from the 35th district
- Incumbent
- Assumed office January 13, 2026 Serving with Al Abdelaziz
- Preceded by: Shavonda E. Sumter

Personal details
- Born: November 2, 1980 (age 46)
- Party: Democratic
- Spouse: LaToyia Jenkins Stewart
- Children: 2
- Education: William Paterson University (BA); Hofstra Law School (J.D.)
- Website: Legislative webpage

Kenyatta Stewart (born November 2, 1980) is an American Democratic Party politician who has represented the 35th legislative district in the New Jersey General Assembly since taking office in January 2026. He also serves as corporation counsel for the City of Newark.

== Political career ==
=== New Jersey General Assembly ===
Stewart was elected to the open seat, succeeding Shavonda Sumter following her retirement from the legislature at the end of her term. He appointed Habib Kader as his Chief of Staff, who previously served as Chief of Staff of Paterson and Deputy Chief of Staff to Al Abdelaziz.

Stewart serves in the Assembly on the Appropriations; Health; and Judiciary committees.
