= Jerry Speziale =

American law enforcement officer

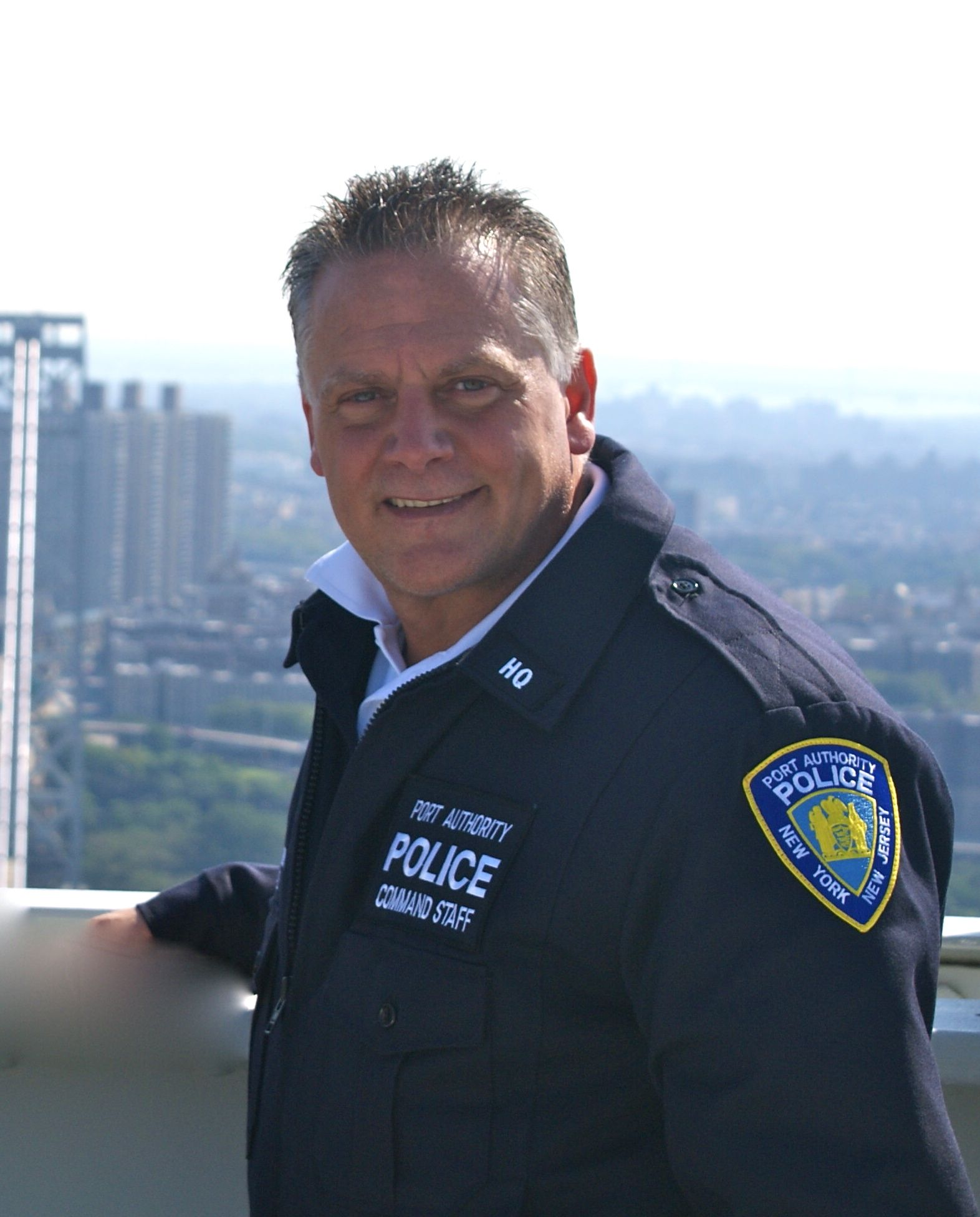
- Speziale in 2011

Police Director of the Paterson Police Department
- Incumbent
- Assumed office July 2014

Police Chief of the Hazleton Police Department
- In office January 2016 – April 2020

Police Chief of the Prichard Police Department
- In office October 2013 – July 2014

Deputy Police Superintendent and Assistant Director of Public Safety of the Port Authority of New York and New Jersey Police Department
- In office August 2010 – October 2013

Sheriff of Passaic County
- In office November 2001 – August 2010
- Preceded by: Edwin Englehardt

Police Chief of the New Hope Police Department
- In office May 2000 – September 2000

Personal details
- Born: 1959 or 1960 (age 66–67)
- Party: Democratic

Jerry Speziale (born 1959 or 1960) is an American law enforcement officer and Public Safety Director of the Paterson Police Department and the Paterson Fire Department in Paterson, New Jersey. A former member of the New York City Police Department, Speziale has also served as the Sheriff of Passaic County, New Jersey, as Deputy Police Superintendent - Assistant Director of Public Safety for the Port Authority of New York and New Jersey Police Department, and as Chief of Police for the City of Prichard, Alabama. He has worked as an undercover officer in the United States Drug Enforcement Administration (DEA), and for the New York Drug Enforcement Task Force while in the NYPD.

Jerry Speziale resigned in 2010 and took a position with the Port Authority of New York and New Jersey. Speziale's decision to move from Passaic County to the Port Authority mid-election was the focus of controversy, and prompted allegations that the appointment was political. Sympathizing with Speziale's family situation, because his wife was suffering from a terminal illness, many respected his right to make this move, but local and countywide Democrats were disappointed with the abruptness of his departing.

In 2003, Speziale had been described as a "flamboyant figure" and as having a "flair for publicity." In 1986, just a few years into his time with the New York City Police Department, Speziale was shot in the line of duty, where Speziale and his partner were ambushed and he was shot. Two other cops were shot and Speziale returned fire and killed the suspect. Speziale, later got involved in undercover drug work that took him to Colombia to help fight the powerful cartels.

Those experiences formed the basis of his published ghostwritten book: “Without a Badge: Undercover in the World’s Deadliest Criminal Organization,” describing his experiences working undercover, and has been featured on the reality TV series Cops. Speziale also played a police captain and served as a "police consultant" for the 2010 film Brooklyn's Finest.

== Early life and education ==
Speziale was born in Paterson, New Jersey to his father, a barber, and his mother, a paralegal. He grew up in Wayne, New Jersey.

== Law enforcement career ==
Speziale joined New York City Police Department (NYPD) in 1983. In 1986, he was shot during a shootout with a robber who had taken hostages. Speziale later worked as a detective on the narcotics squad, and befriended future NYPD Commissioner Bernard Kerik. During the 1990s, he became an undercover agent for the DEA, and was a member of the DEA's "Group 93," which was tasked with fighting Colombian Drug Cartels. Having reached the rank of first-grade detective, Speziale retired from the NYPD on a disability pension in 1997, citing injuries. He returned to police work at the Bergen County Sheriff's Department, and served as the Chief of Police for New Hope, Pennsylvania, for five months in 2000, before running for Sheriff of Passaic County in the November, 2001 elections.

=== Passaic County Sheriff ===
In November 2001, Speziale was elected Sheriff of Passaic County, New Jersey. Although he had campaigned for Republican candidates in 1999, Speziale ran as a Democrat, and replaced Republican Edwin Englehardt, who had served as sheriff for 27 years. He was re-elected sheriff twice, in 2004 and 2007.

In August 2002, federal officials criticized him for a "shameful media grab at the expense of a federal investigation that was not complete" while conducting a raid of a Paterson office that produced phony documents that were reportedly sold to several 9/11 hijackers. Federal officials were upset that Speziale's detectives did not inform the FBI about the raid and Speziale publicly released the details of the Sheriff's Office investigation, and had invited reporters to accompany police on the raid. Shortly after the raid, New Jersey's Attorney General ordered all local law enforcement authorities to get permission from a special liaison before seeking terrorism-related search warrants. The incident reportedly led to a "deep chill" in relations between the US Attorney's office and Speziale's staff. Until the raid, the Sheriff's department and the FBI had been investigating jointly. Although, Speziale has served since 1994 as a consultant, instructor and subject matter expert on multijurisdictional law enforcement investigations involving wiretaps to federal law enforcement agencies around the nation.

Speziale also came into conflict with Passaic County freeholders (county legislators) and the state Civil Service Commission over the number of patronage appointments that he was allowed to make as Sheriff. The dispute centered on whether supervisors should count as sheriff's officers when calculating the number of "at-will" investigators the sheriff could hire. Initially, the state civil service commission and county freeholders accused Speziale of exceeding his budget by making an excessive number of patronage appointments, ordering him to fire eight investigators who had been hired in addition to the 20 "at-will" officers already added to the force. In March 2011, however, the New Jersey Civil Service Commission changed its stance, ruling that supervisors should count as sheriff's officers, and that Speziale had been within his rights when he hired the eight additional officers. By that time, Speziale had already left the Sheriff's office and the number of staff had been reduced.

On August 10, 2010, Speziale resigned in order to accept a post as Deputy Superintendent of the Port Authority of New York and New Jersey police. Speziale cited family reasons as his reason for resigning and abandoning his re-election campaign. According to The Record columnist Alfred Doblin, Speziale's decision to resign so suddenly, and during a campaign, was "a slap in the face to political allies and donors," and his decision to distribute the $1 million in campaign funds that Speziale had already raised to charity - rather than to other Democratic candidates - added "insult to injury." Republican Assemblyman Scott Rumana told reporters that he had helped to arrange Speziale's new job, in conjunction with the office of New Jersey's republican governor, Chris Christie. In response, the Passaic County freeholder board's democratic majority called for a criminal investigation, asserting that Speziale had been offered the job in order to entice him out of the race for Sheriff. Several years later, The Record reported that "nothing ever came" of the state investigation. Controversy over the appointment resurfaced in June 2015, however, when former Port Authority official David Wildstein - a key figure in the Fort Lee lane closure scandal - alleged in a sworn statement that Christie had arranged for the Port Authority to hire Speziale in order to take both him and his campaign funds out of the race.

In 2019, a grass roots support group of Jerry Speziale collected 4000 signatures in a few days for him to run for Passaic County Sheriff, in the June 2019 Democratic primary election, but Speziale withdrew after speaking with New Jersey Governor Phil Murphy and State Democratic Chairman John Currie. Both urged him not to run and divide the party. They asked Speziale to be patient and wait his turn. Speziale agreed, stating “The Democratic Party is very important to me and that the party does not need a divisive primary battle."

=== NY-NJ Port Authority Police Department ===
In 2010, Speziale was appointed to the role of Deputy Police Superintendent of the Port Authority of New York and New Jersey Police Department.

In May 2014, Speziale sued the Port Authority of New York and New Jersey in federal court, alleging that the Port Authority had retaliated against him after he uncovered wasteful spending by the authority. In the suit, Speziale claimed that the Port Authority had confiscated his work vehicle, denied him security credentials for Port Authority facilities, denied him medical leave benefits, and subjected him to "daily harassment, intimidation, and demeaning conduct" after he reported misspending to his superiors and that Superintendent Michael Fedorko used police emergency lights going through a red light and being issued an automated red light ticket in Newark, NJ, which was allegedly illegally dismissed. The case was put on hold in January 2016, because it involves witnesses in the criminal case related to the Fort Lee lane closure scandal and has been reopened in January 2018.

Speziale's civil complaint reported similar conduct and in April 2018, the Port Authority Inspector General's Office began investigating claims about special treatment Radio Host Rush Limbaugh said he received from Port Authority Police Superintendent Michael Fedorko on April 12, 2018, by receiving a police escort, lights and siren from Newark Liberty Airport to downtown Manhattan. Port Authority protocols prohibit providing a police escort for a celebrity. On May 7, 2018, Michael Fedorko's police escort of Rush Limbaugh from Newark Airport to Manhattan stirred controversy. Fedorko abruptly announced his retirement, less than a week after news reported investigators were looking into a recent "lights and sirens" escort provided for Rush Limbaugh. The Port Authority's ethics policy states it's a conflict of interest for a Port Authority employee to use his or her position to achieve or appear to achieve personal financial gain or other advantage. The agency's Inspector General had opened an investigation into the escort Fedorko gave the conservative radio show host from Newark Liberty International Airport to Manhattan, where he was a last-minute speaker at a charity dinner.

=== Prichard, Alabama police ===
After seeking a position as police chief in Port St. Lucie, Florida, Miami, and Cincinnati, Speziale accepted a post as the police chief of Prichard, Alabama, in October, 2013. According to the Bergen Record, Speziale continued to exhibit a "flair for publicity" as police chief in Prichard. The reality TV show Cops, which had had a relationship with Speziale in Passaic County, filmed a segment in Prichard shortly after Speziale's arrival. Local media reported that Speziale was a "force on the streets" in Prichard, and was known for participating in raids and investigations alongside officers.

Speziale resigned as chief of the Prichard police after nine months in the post, citing his desire to return to New Jersey to be with his children after the recent death of his wife. His departure surprised Prichard officials.

=== Paterson, New Jersey police ===
In July 2014, Paterson, New Jersey Mayor Jose Torres appointed Speziale as Paterson's new police director as one of his first acts upon assuming office. The number of reported crimes in Paterson reached a 25-year-low in 2016, according to data reported by the city. Overall reported crime fell by about 12 percent from 2015 to 2016. The drop is the second annual decrease for the city, after 5,060 crimes were reported in 2016. Torres said he was encouraged by the statistics and said he was confident Speziale would continue to reduce crime. Speziale credited the work of city police officers.

In January 2019, Paterson saw a dramatic 50 percent reduction in the number of homicides in 2018, numbers officials are hailing as evidence that the city is becoming a safer place. The city's 12 homicides last year was lower than any other time since 2004, according to the Uniform Crime Statistics report compiled by the New Jersey State Police.

=== Hazleton, Pennsylvania Police Chief ===
In January 2016, Hazleton, Pennsylvania Mayor Jeff Cusat appointed Speziale as Hazleton City's Interim Police Chief.

Months later, the Hazleton Headlines reported that Speziale became Hazleton City's full-time police chief sometime between late January and early February of that same year.

Crime in Hazleton decreased significantly in 2016. Year-end numbers show a 26 percent decrease in crime reported by the police department in November held steady through the final weeks of December. Police officers and the community working together, along with technology contributed to the crime decline, which Hazleton Police Chief Jerry Speziale said is at a 10-year low for the department in the major crime categories. Hazleton, Pennsylvania Police credit community, technology with 26 percent drop in crime.

In April 2020, Speziale took a leave of absence from his role at the Hazleton Police Department, after Paterson Mayor Andre Sayegh had told him to give up the Hazleton job the year prior.

== Writing and acting career ==
In 2003, Jerry Speziale released a book which he co-authored with journalist Mark Seal, titled Without A Badge: Undercover in the World's Deadliest Criminal Organization, about his experiences working undercover in Colombia.

In 2009, Speziale played the role of Captain Sidney Geraci in the crime film Brooklyn's Finest, directed by Antoine Fuqua. Speziale also received a credit as the film's "Police Consultant."

In 2014, Speziale was featured on the TV show Cops, while at the Prichard Police Department.

In 2019, Paterson's fire department began being featured on Live Rescue, an A&E show following fire departments and EMT squads as they respond to calls.

In 2022, Paterson's police department began being featured on On Patrol: Live, airing on Reelz. Speziale himself has appeared on the show, among officers of the Paterson Police Department.
