= 2016 United States House of Representatives elections in New Jersey =

- November 8, 2016

All 12 New Jersey seats to the United States House of Representatives
- Turnout: 68% (▲32pp)
	Majority party	Minority party
Party	Democratic	Republican
Last election	6	6
Seats won	7	5
Seat change	▲1	▼1
Popular vote	1,821,620	1,541,631
Percentage	54.16%	45.84%
Swing	▲3.97%	▼2.33%

Democratic
40–50%
50–60%
60–70%
70–80%
80–90%
Republican
40–50%
50–60%
60–70%

The 2016 United States House of Representatives elections in New Jersey were held on November 8, 2016, to elect the 12 U.S. representatives from the state of New Jersey, one from each of the state's 12 congressional districts. The elections coincided with the 2016 U.S. presidential election, as well as other elections to the House of Representatives, elections to the United States Senate and various state and local elections. The primaries were held on June 7.

The only competitive district this cycle was the 5th, which Democrats flipped, thereby giving them a 7–5 majority in the delegation.

== District 1 ==
2016 New Jersey's 1st congressional district election
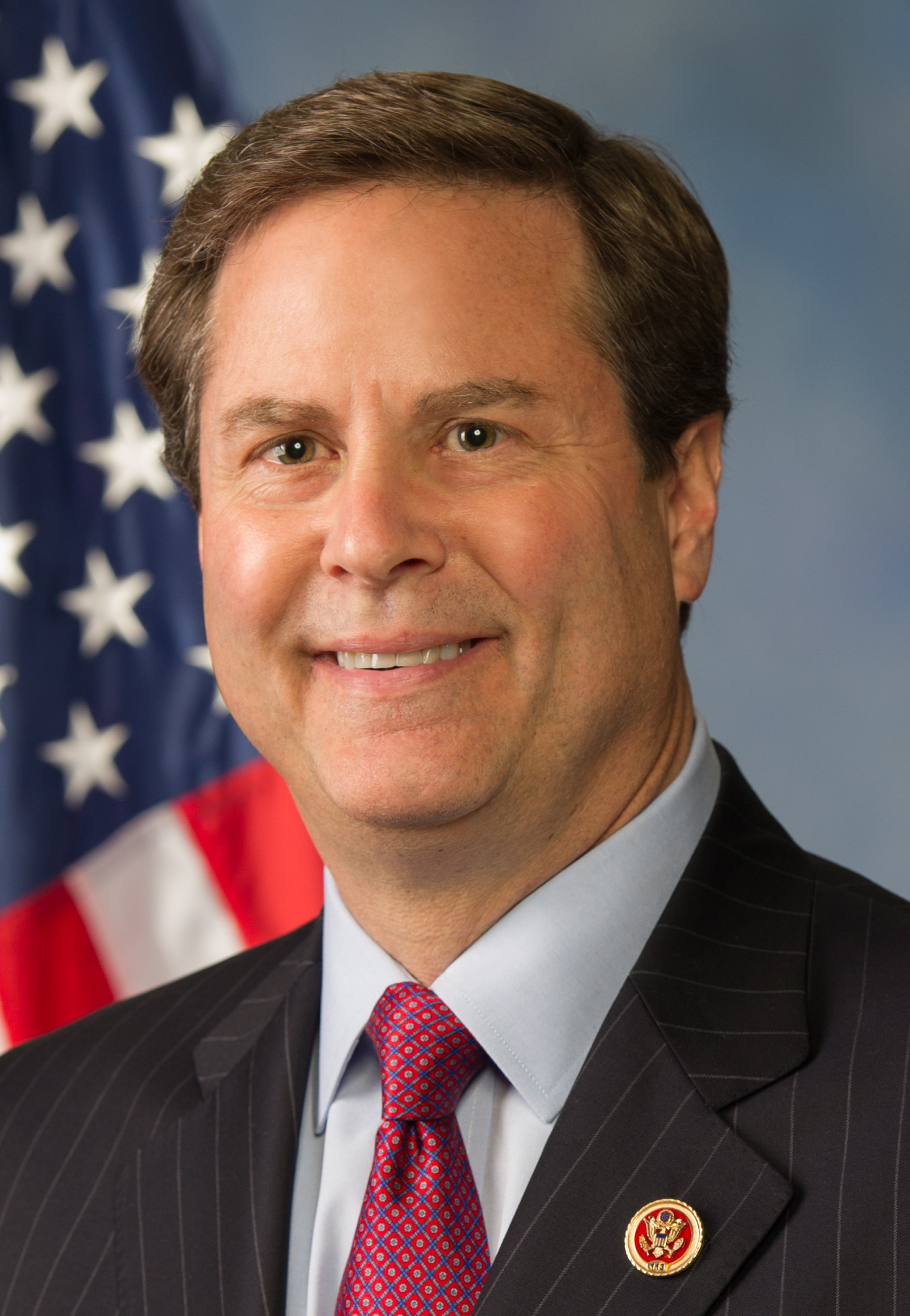

Nominee	Donald Norcross	Bob Patterson
Party	Democratic	Republican
Popular vote	183,231	112,388
Percentage	60.0%	36.8%
- Norcross: 50–60% 60–70% 70–80% 80–90% >90% Patterson: 50–60% >90%
U.S. Representative before election
Donald Norcross
Democratic
Elected U.S. Representative
Donald Norcross
Democratic

Democratic Party incumbent Donald Norcross was first elected to this seat in the 2014 election.

=== Democratic primary ===
==== Candidates ====
===== Nominee =====
- Donald Norcross, incumbent U.S. Representative

===== Eliminated in primary =====
- Alex Law

==== Results ====
Democratic primary results
Party	Candidate	Votes	%
Democratic	Donald Norcross (incumbent)	56,753	70.3
Democratic	Alex Law	23,986	29.7
Total votes		80,739	100.0

=== Republican primary ===
==== Candidates ====
===== Nominee =====
- Bob Patterson, senior speechwriter in the George W. Bush's administration and adjunct professor of government at Patrick Henry College

==== Results ====
Republican primary results
Party	Candidate	Votes	%
Republican	Bob Patterson	23,813	100.0
Total votes		23,813	100.0

=== General election ===
==== Endorsements ====
Donald Norcross (D)

Labor unions

- AFL-CIO

==== Predictions ====
Source	Ranking	As of
The Cook Political Report	Safe D	November 7, 2016
Daily Kos Elections	Safe D	November 7, 2016
Rothenberg	Safe D	November 3, 2016
Sabato's Crystal Ball	Safe D	November 7, 2016
RCP	Safe D	October 31, 2016

==== Results ====
New Jersey's 1st congressional district, 2016
Party	Candidate	Votes	%
Democratic	Donald Norcross (incumbent)	183,231	60.0
Republican	Bob Patterson	112,388	36.8
Independent	Scot John Tomaszewski	5,473	1.8
Libertarian	William F. Sihr IV	2,410	0.8
Independent	Michael Berman	1,971	0.6
Total votes		305,473	100.0
Democratic hold			

==== By county ====
County	Donald Norcross Democratic		Bob Patterson Republican		Various candidates Other parties		Margin		Total votes cast
County	#	%	#	%	#	%	#	%	Total votes cast
Burlington (part)	6,000	58.2%	4,009	38.9%	293	2.8%	1,991	19.3%	10,302
Camden (part)	130,259	63.2%	69,503	33.8%	6,174	3.0%	60,656	29.4%	205,836
Gloucester (part)	47,072	52.7%	38,876	43.5%	3,387	3.9%	8,196	9.2%	89,335
Totals	183,231	60.0%	112,388	36.8%	9,854	3.2%	70,843	23.2%	305,473

== District 2 ==
2016 New Jersey's 2nd congressional district election
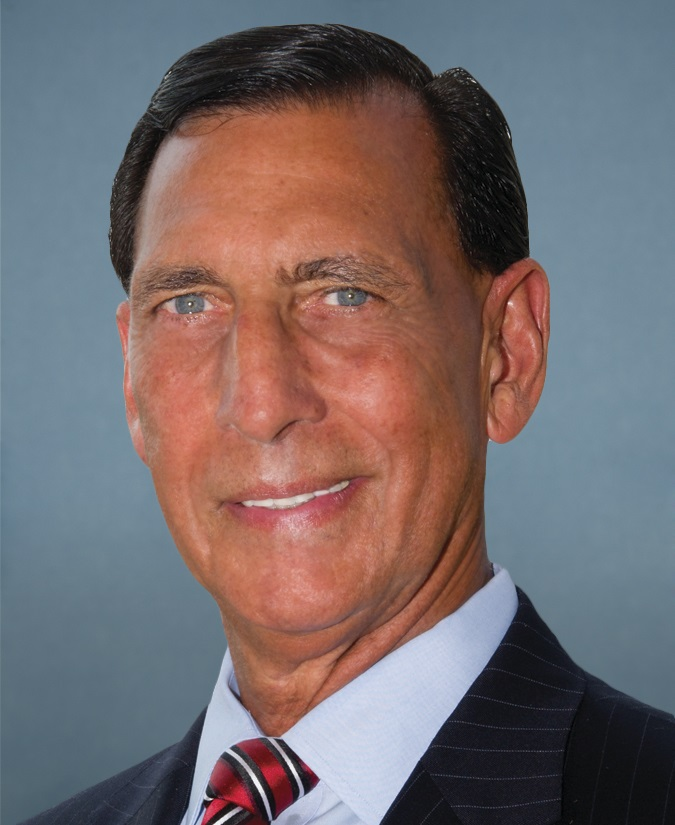

Nominee	Frank LoBiondo	David Cole
Party	Republican	Democratic
Popular vote	176,338	110,838
Percentage	59.2%	37.2%
- LoBiondo: 40–50% 50–60% 60–70% 70–80% Cole: 50–60% 60–70% 70–80%
U.S. Representative before election
Frank LoBiondo
Republican
Elected U.S. Representative
Frank LoBiondo
Republican

Republican Frank LoBiondo has represented this district since 1995.

=== Republican primary ===
==== Candidates ====
===== Nominee =====
- Frank LoBiondo, incumbent U.S. Representative

==== Results ====
Republican primary results
Party	Candidate	Votes	%
Republican	Frank LoBiondo (incumbent)	39,913	100.0
Total votes		39,913	100.0

=== Democratic primary ===
==== Candidates ====
===== Nominee =====
- David Cole, former White House aide, Barack Obama campaign staffer and candidate for this seat in 2014

===== Eliminated in primary =====
- Constantino "Tino" Rozzo

==== Results ====
Democratic primary results
Party	Candidate	Votes	%
Democratic	David H. Cole	33,961	81.1
Democratic	Constantino "Tino" Rozzo	7,932	18.9
Total votes		41,893	100.0

=== General election ===
==== Endorsements ====
Frank LoBiondo (R)

Labor unions

- AFL-CIO

==== Polling ====
Poll source	Date(s) administered	Sample size	Margin of error	Frank LoBiondo (R)	David Cole (D)	Other	Undecided
Stockton University	October 19–23, 2016	625	± 3.9%	59%	34%	3%	4%

==== Predictions ====
Source	Ranking	As of
The Cook Political Report	Safe R	November 7, 2016
Daily Kos Elections	Safe R	November 7, 2016
Rothenberg	Safe R	November 3, 2016
Sabato's Crystal Ball	Safe R	November 7, 2016
RCP	Safe R	October 31, 2016

==== Results ====
New Jersey's 2nd congressional district, 2016
Party	Candidate	Votes	%
Republican	Frank LoBiondo (incumbent)	176,338	59.2
Democratic	David H. Cole	110,838	37.2
Libertarian	John Ordille	3,773	1.3
Independent	James Keenan	2,653	0.9
Independent	Steven Fenichel	1,574	0.5
Independent	Eric Beechwood	1,387	0.5
Independent	Gabriel Brian Franco	1,232	0.4
Total votes		297,795	100.0
Republican hold			

==== By county ====
County	Frank LoBiondo Republican		David Cole Democratic		Various candidates Other parties		Margin		Total votes cast
County	#	%	#	%	#	%	#	%	Total votes cast
Atlantic	59,858	54.6%	45,898	41.8%	3,918	3.6%	13,960	12.8%	109,674
Burlington (part)	720	73.5%	233	23.8%	27	2.7%	487	49.7%	980
Camden (part)	2,990	61.8%	1,723	35.6%	124	2.5%	1,267	26.2%	4,837
Cape May	29,796	67.5%	12,949	29.3%	1,385	3.1%	16,847	38.2%	44,130
Cumberland	26,837	55.6%	19,482	40.4%	1,935	4.0%	7,355	15.2%	48,254
Gloucester (part)	24,318	59.5%	15,441	37.8%	1,115	2.8%	8,877	21.7%	40,874
Ocean (part)	13,268	66.6%	5,882	29.5%	784	4.0%	7,386	37.1%	19,934
Salem	18,551	63.7%	9,230	31.7%	1,331	4.5%	9,321	22.0%	29,112
Totals	176,338	59.2%	110,838	37.2%	10,619	3.6%	65,500	22.0%	297,795

== District 3 ==
2016 New Jersey's 3rd congressional district election
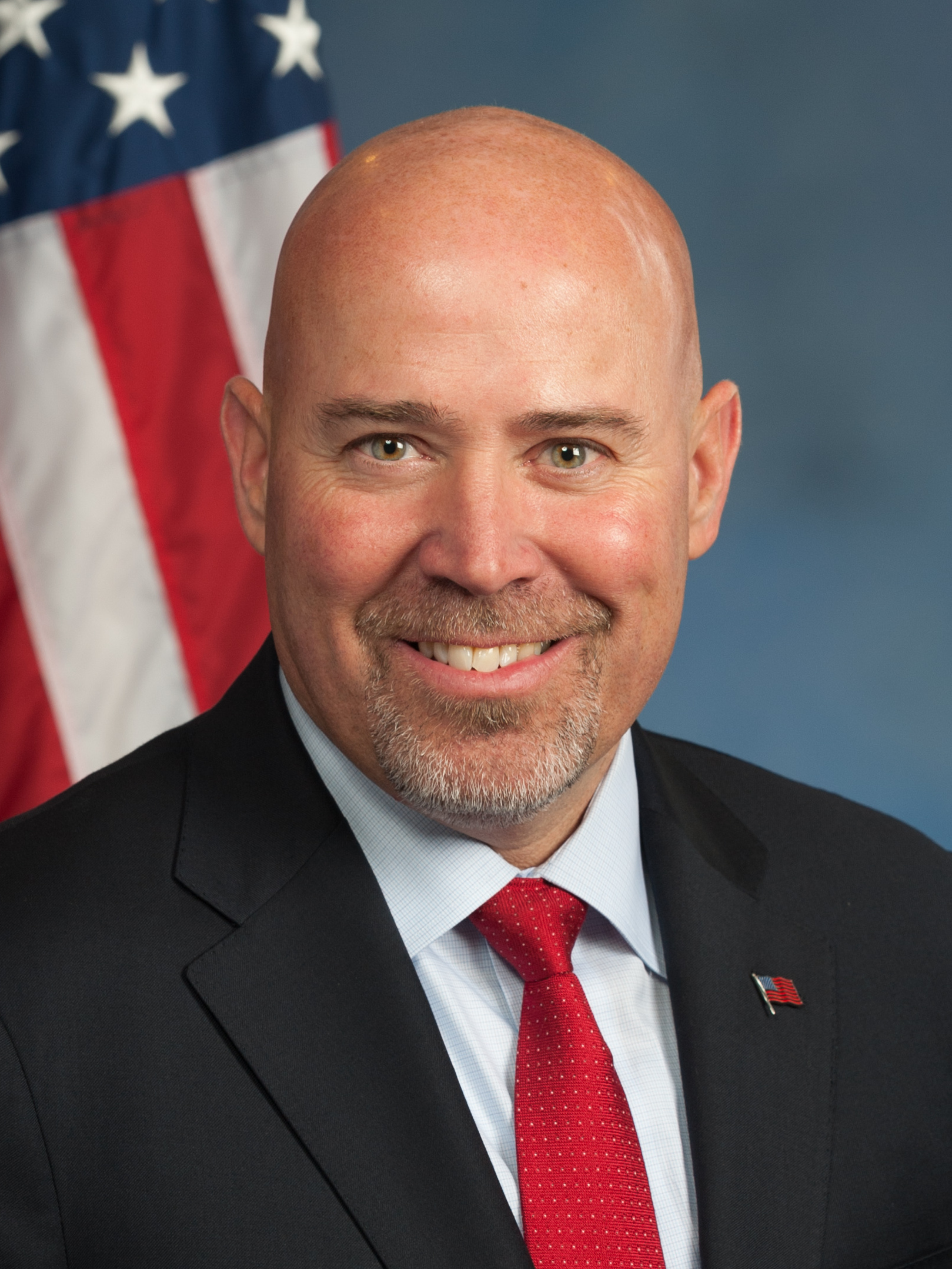

Nominee	Tom MacArthur	Fred LaVergne
Party	Republican	Democratic
Popular vote	194,596	127,526
Percentage	59.3%	38.9%
- MacArthur: 40–50% 50–60% 60–70% 70–80% LaVergne: 50–60% 80–90%
U.S. Representative before election
Tom MacArthur
Republican
Elected U.S. Representative
Tom MacArthur
Republican

Republican Tom MacArthur had represented this district since 2015.

=== Republican primary ===
==== Candidates ====
===== Nominee =====
- Tom MacArthur, incumbent U.S. Representative

==== Results ====
Republican primary results
Party	Candidate	Votes	%
Republican	Tom MacArthur (incumbent)	46,264	100.0
Total votes		46,264	100.0

=== Democratic primary ===
==== Candidates ====
===== Nominee =====
- Fred LaVergne, activist

===== Eliminated in primary =====
- Jim Keady, activist and educator

==== Results ====
Democratic primary results
Party	Candidate	Votes	%
Democratic	Frederick John LaVergne	32,963	62.8
Democratic	Jim Keady	19,526	37.2
Total votes		52,489	100.0

=== General election ===
==== Predictions ====
Source	Ranking	As of
The Cook Political Report	Safe R	November 7, 2016
Daily Kos Elections	Safe R	November 7, 2016
Rothenberg	Safe R	November 3, 2016
Sabato's Crystal Ball	Safe R	November 7, 2016
RCP	Safe R	October 31, 2016

==== Results ====
New Jersey's 3rd congressional district, 2016
Party	Candidate	Votes	%
Republican	Tom MacArthur (incumbent)	194,596	59.3
Democratic	Frederick John Lavergne	127,526	38.9
Constitution	Lawrence W. Berlinski Jr.	5,938	1.8
Total votes		328,060	100.0
Republican hold			

==== By county ====
County	Tom MacArthur Republican		Frederick LaVergne Democratic		Lawrence Berlinski Constitution		Margin		Total votes cast
County	#	%	#	%	#	%	#	%	Total votes cast
Burlington (part)	99,449	53.0%	85,760	45.7%	2,399	1.3%	13,689	6.3%	187,608
Ocean (part)	95,147	67.7%	41,766	29.7%	3,539	2.5%	53,381	38.0%	140,452
Totals	194,596	59.3%	127,526	38.9%	5,938	1.8%	67,070	20.4%	328,060

== District 4 ==
2016 New Jersey's 4th congressional district election
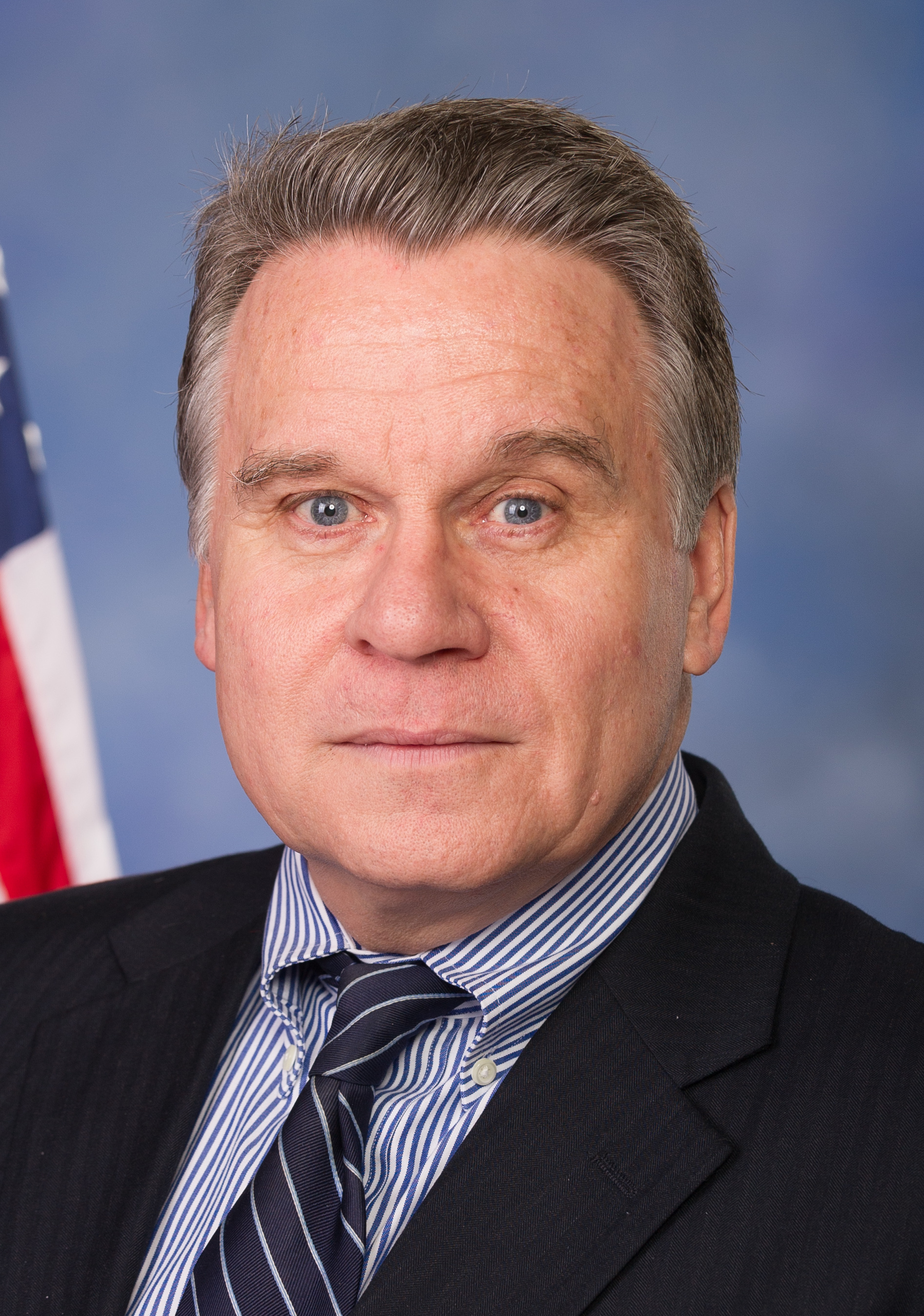

Nominee	Chris Smith	Lorna Phillipson
Party	Republican	Democratic
Popular vote	211,992	111,532
Percentage	63.7%	33.5%
- Smith: 50–60% 60–70% 70–80% Phillipson: 40–50% 50–60% 60–70%
U.S. Representative before election
Chris Smith
Republican
Elected U.S. Representative
Chris Smith
Republican

Republican Chris Smith has represented this district since 1981.

=== Republican primary ===
==== Candidates ====
===== Nominee =====
- Chris Smith, incumbent U.S. Representative

===== Eliminated in primary =====
- Bruce C MacDonald, jewellery store owner

==== Results ====
Republican primary results
Party	Candidate	Votes	%
Republican	Christopher H. Smith (incumbent)	41,789	92.0
Republican	Bruce C MacDonald	3,645	8.0
Total votes		45,434	100.0

=== Democratic primary ===
==== Candidates ====
===== Nominee =====
- Lorna Phillipson, candidate for the General Assembly in 2015

==== Results ====
Democratic primary results
Party	Candidate	Votes	%
Democratic	Lorna Phillipson	40,528	100.0
Total votes		40,528	100.0

=== General election ===
==== Endorsements ====
Chris Smith (R)

Labor unions

- AFL-CIO

==== Predictions ====
Source	Ranking	As of
The Cook Political Report	Safe R	November 7, 2016
Daily Kos Elections	Safe R	November 7, 2016
Rothenberg	Safe R	November 3, 2016
Sabato's Crystal Ball	Safe R	November 7, 2016
RCP	Safe R	October 31, 2016

==== Results ====
New Jersey's 4th congressional district, 2016
Party	Candidate	Votes	%
Republican	Chris Smith (incumbent)	211,992	63.7
Democratic	Lorna Phillipson	111,532	33.5
Independent	Hank Schroeder	5,840	1.8
Libertarian	Jeremy Marcus	3,320	1.0
Total votes		332,684	100.0
Republican hold			

==== By county ====
County	Chris Smith Republican		Lorna Phillipson Democratic		Various candidates Other parties		Margin		Total votes cast
County	#	%	#	%	#	%	#	%	Total votes cast
Mercer (part)	27,988	59.5%	18,382	39.1%	632	1.3%	9,606	20.4%	47,002
Monmouth (part)	121,856	61.2%	71,105	35.7%	6,089	3.0%	50,751	25.5%	199,050
Ocean (part)	62,148	71.7%	22,045	25.4%	2,439	2.8%	40,103	46.3%	86,632
Totals	211,992	63.7%	111,532	33.5%	9,160	2.8%	100,460	30.2%	332,684

== District 5 ==
2016 New Jersey's 5th congressional district election
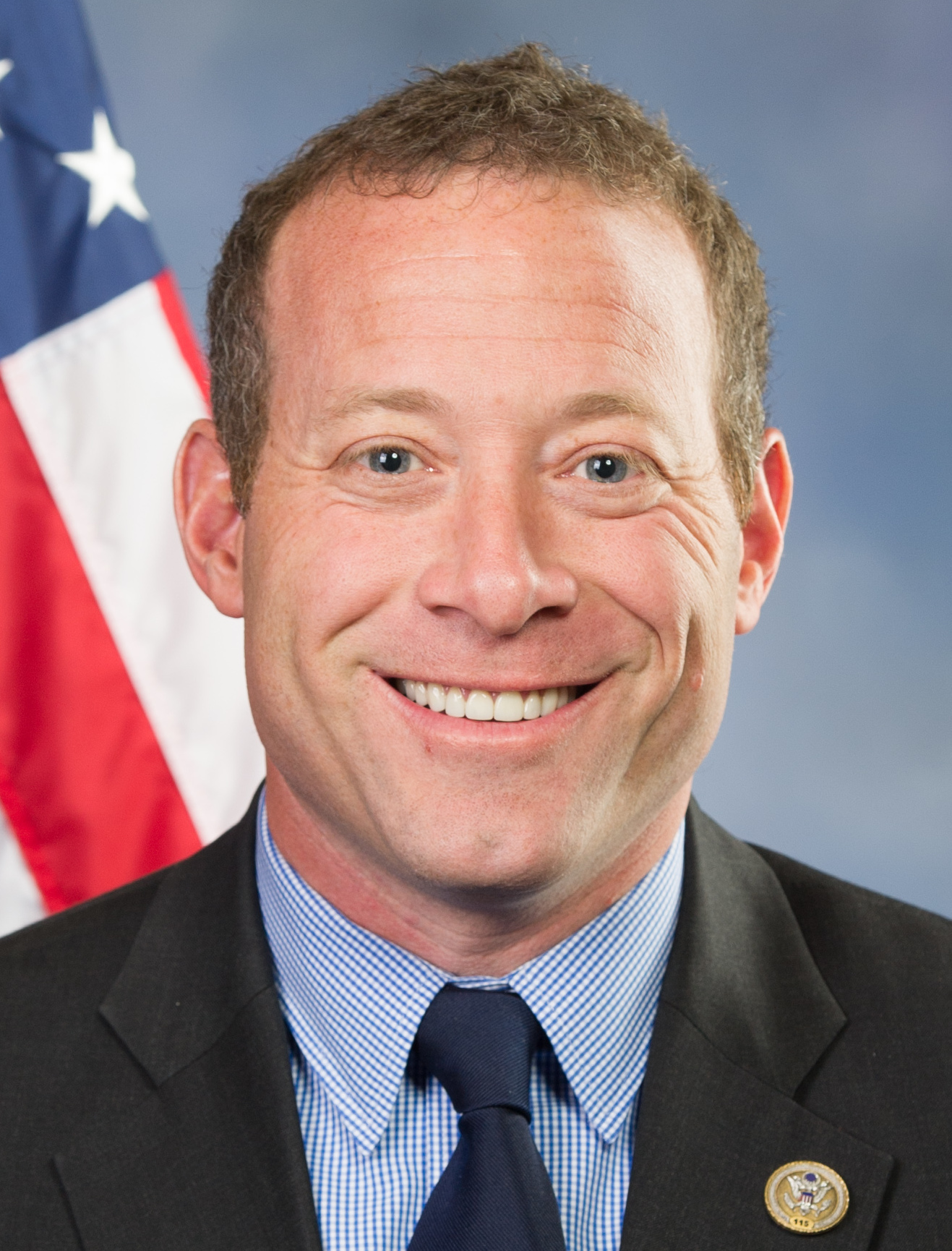

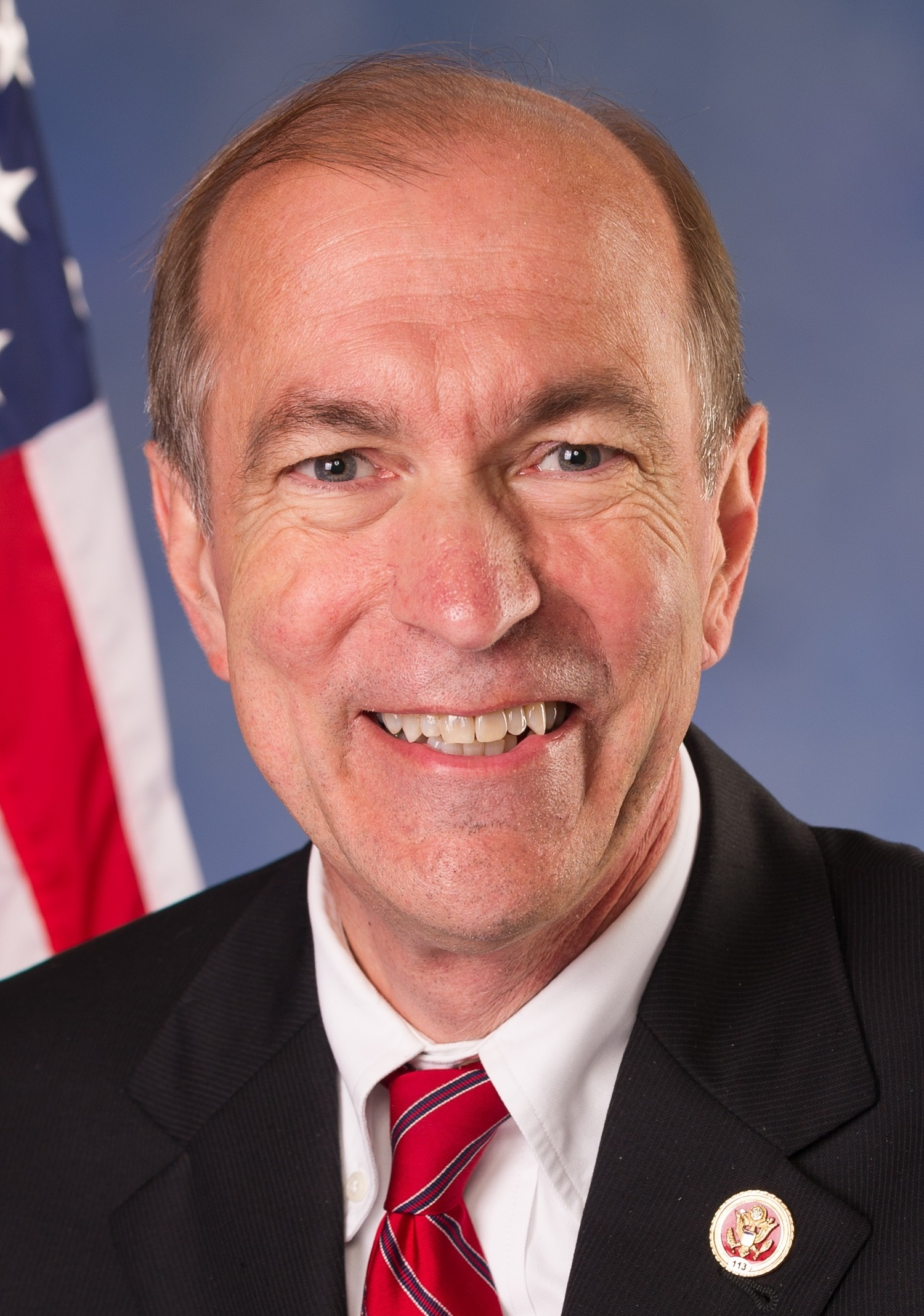
Nominee	Josh Gottheimer	Scott Garrett
Party	Democratic	Republican
Popular vote	172,587	157,690
Percentage	51.1%	46.7%
- Gottheimer: 40–50% 50–60% 60–70% 70–80% Garrett: 40–50% 50–60% 60–70%
U.S. Representative before election
Scott Garrett
Republican
Elected U.S. Representative
Josh Gottheimer
Democratic

Republican incumbent Scott Garrett had served for seven terms. Josh Gottheimer, a former speechwriter for Bill Clinton and aide for the 2004 presidential campaign of John Kerry and the 2008 presidential campaign of Hillary Clinton, ran against Garrett as a Democrat.

=== Republican primary ===
==== Candidates ====
===== Nominee =====
- Scott Garrett, incumbent U.S. Representative

===== Eliminated in primary =====
- Michael Cino, oil executive and candidate for this seat in 2006 & 2012
- Peter Vallorosi

==== Results ====
Republican primary results
Party	Candidate	Votes	%
Republican	Scott Garrett (incumbent)	42,179	82.2
Republican	Peter Vallorosi	4,884	9.5
Republican	Michael J Cino	4,252	8.3
Total votes		51,315	100.0

=== Democratic primary ===
==== Candidates ====
===== Nominee =====
- Josh Gottheimer, former senior counselor to the chair of the FCC and speechwriter for Bill Clinton

==== Results ====
Democratic primary results
Party	Candidate	Votes	%
Democratic	Josh Gottheimer	43,250	100.0
Total votes		43,250	100.0

=== General election ===
==== Endorsements ====
Josh Gottheimer (D)

Labor unions

- AFL-CIO

Organizations

- Democratic Congressional Campaign Committee "Red to Blue" Program

==== Predictions ====
Source	Ranking	As of
The Cook Political Report	Tossup	November 7, 2016
Daily Kos Elections	Tossup	November 7, 2016
Rothenberg	Tilt D (flip)	November 3, 2016
Sabato's Crystal Ball	Lean D (flip)	November 7, 2016
RCP	Tossup	October 31, 2016

==== Results ====
New Jersey's 5th congressional district, 2016
Party	Candidate	Votes	%
Democratic	Josh Gottheimer	172,587	51.1
Republican	Scott Garrett (incumbent)	157,690	46.7
Libertarian	Claudio Belusic	7,424	2.2
Total votes		337,701	100.0
Democratic gain from Republican			

==== By county ====
County	Josh Gottheimer Democratic		Scott Garrett Republican		Claudio Belusic Libertarian		Margin		Total votes cast
County	#	%	#	%	#	%	#	%	Total votes cast
Bergen (part)	135,681	56.2%	101,859	42.2%	3,985	1.6%	33,822	14.0%	241,525
Passaic (part)	7,449	41.9%	9,962	56.0%	387	2.2%	−2,513	−14.1%	17,798
Sussex (part)	17,880	37.1%	28,117	58.4%	2,173	4.5%	−10,237	−21.3%	48,170
Warren (part)	11,577	38.3%	17,752	58.8%	879	2.9%	−6,175	−20.5%	30,208
Totals	172,587	51.1%	157,690	46.7%	7,424	2.2%	14,897	4.4%	337,701

== District 6 ==
2016 New Jersey's 6th congressional district election
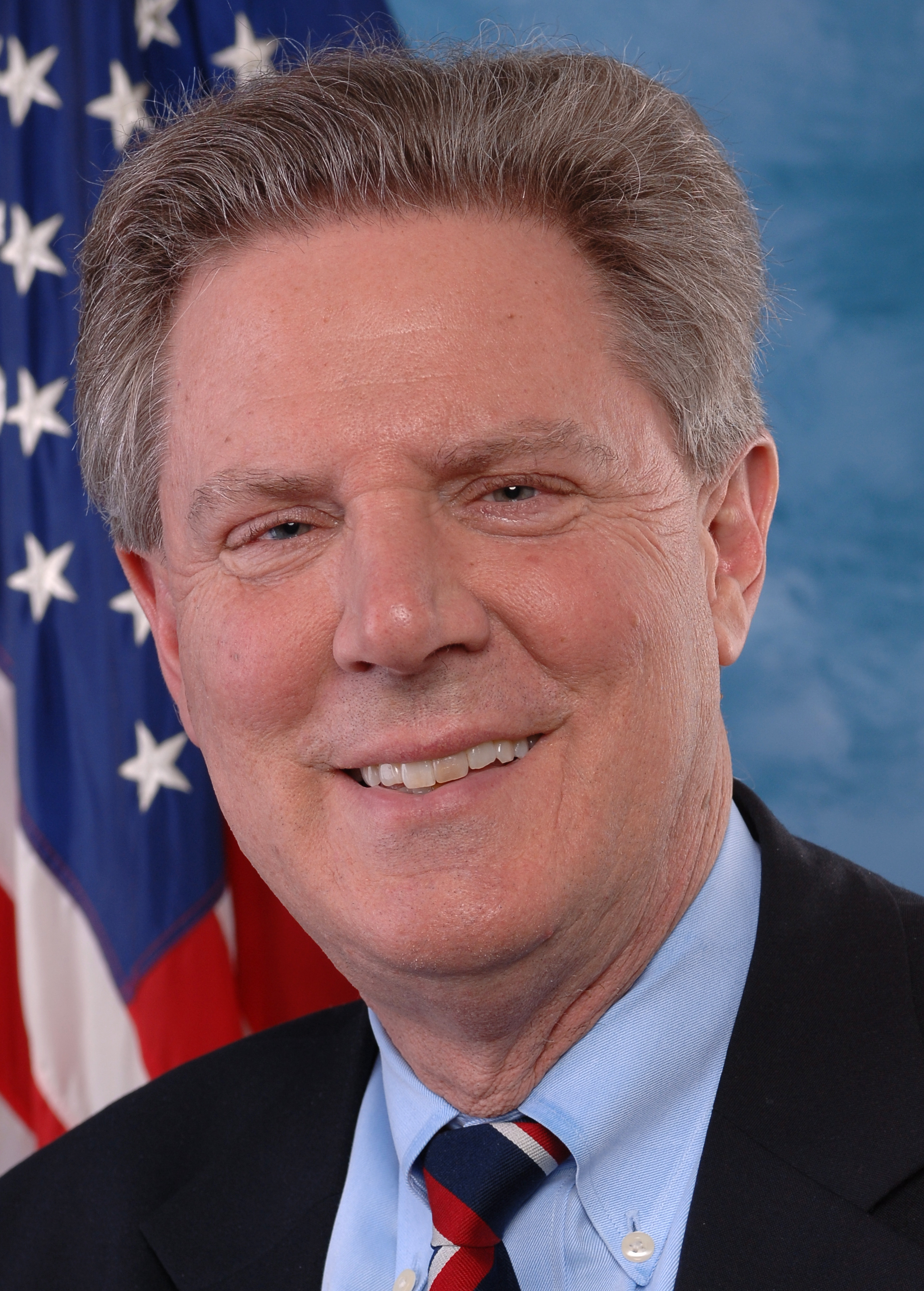

Nominee	Frank Pallone	Brent Sonnek-Schmelz
Party	Democratic	Republican
Popular vote	167,895	91,908
Percentage	63.7%	34.9%
- Pallone: 40–50% 50–60% 60–70% 70–80% 80–90% Sonnek-Schmelz: 40–50% 50–60%
U.S. Representative before election
Frank Pallone
Democratic
Elected U.S. Representative
Frank Pallone
Democratic

Democratic Frank Pallone has represented this district since 1989.

=== Democratic primary ===
==== Candidates ====
===== Nominee =====
- Frank Pallone, incumbent U.S. Representative

==== Results ====
Democratic primary results
Party	Candidate	Votes	%
Democratic	Frank Pallone Jr. (incumbent)	52,231	100.0
Total votes		52,231	100.0

=== Republican primary ===
==== Candidates ====
===== Nominee =====
- Brent Sonnek-Schmelz

==== Results ====
Republican primary results
Party	Candidate	Votes	%
Republican	Brent Sonnek-Schmelz	17,856	100.0
Total votes		17,856	100.0

=== General election ===
==== Endorsements ====
Frank Pallone (D)

Labor unions

- AFL-CIO

==== Predictions ====
Source	Ranking	As of
The Cook Political Report	Safe D	November 7, 2016
Daily Kos Elections	Safe D	November 7, 2016
Rothenberg	Safe D	November 3, 2016
Sabato's Crystal Ball	Safe D	November 7, 2016
RCP	Safe D	October 31, 2016

==== Results ====
New Jersey's 6th congressional district, 2016
Party	Candidate	Votes	%
Democratic	Frank Pallone (incumbent)	167,895	63.7
Republican	Brent Sonnek-Schmelz	91,908	34.9
Green	Rajit B. Malliah	1,912	0.7
Libertarian	Judith Shamy	1,720	0.7
Total votes		263,435	100.0
Democratic hold			

==== By county ====
County	Frank Pallone Democratic		Brent Sonnek-Schmelz Republican		Various candidates Other parties		Margin		Total votes cast
County	#	%	#	%	#	%	#	%	Total votes cast
Middlesex (part)	116,600	68.7%	50,849	30.0%	2,261	1.3%	65,751	38.7%	169,710
Monmouth (part)	51,295	54.7%	41,059	43.8%	1,371	1.5%	10,236	10.9%	93,725
Totals	167,895	63.7%	91,908	34.9%	3,632	1.4%	75,987	28.8%	263,435

== District 7 ==
2016 New Jersey's 7th congressional district election
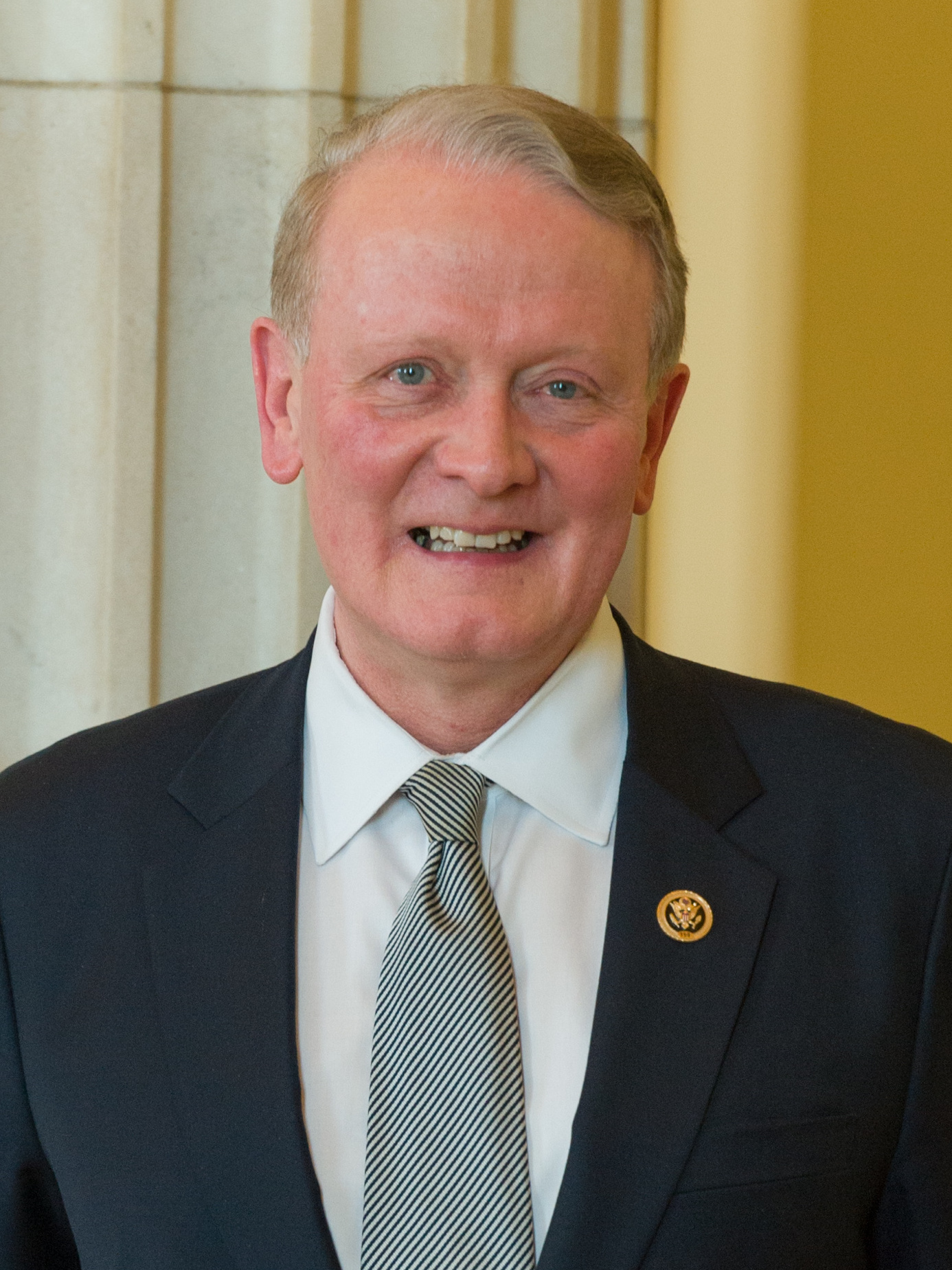

Nominee	Leonard Lance	Peter Jacob
Party	Republican	Democratic
Popular vote	185,850	148,188
Percentage	54.1%	43.1%
- Lance: 40–50% 50–60% 60–70% Jacob: 40–50% 50–60% 60–70%
U.S. Representative before election
Leonard Lance
Republican
Elected U.S. Representative
Leonard Lance
Republican

Republican Leonard Lance has represented this district since 2009.

=== Republican primary ===
==== Candidates ====
===== Nominee =====
- Leonard Lance, incumbent U.S. Representative

===== Eliminated in primary =====
- David Larsen, small-business owner
- Craig P. Heard

==== Results ====
Republican primary results
Party	Candidate	Votes	%
Republican	Leonard Lance (incumbent)	31,807	53.9
Republican	David Larsen	19,425	32.9
Republican	Craig P. Heard	7,774	13.2
Total votes		59,006	100.0

=== Democratic primary ===
==== Candidates ====
===== Nominee =====
- Peter Jacob, social worker

==== Results ====
Democratic primary results
Party	Candidate	Votes	%
Democratic	Peter Jacob	46,152	100.0
Total votes		46,152	100.0

=== General election ===
==== Endorsements ====
Peter Jacob (D)

Labor unions

- AFL-CIO

==== Predictions ====
Source	Ranking	As of
The Cook Political Report	Safe R	November 7, 2016
Daily Kos Elections	Safe R	November 7, 2016
Rothenberg	Safe R	November 3, 2016
Sabato's Crystal Ball	Safe R	November 7, 2016
RCP	Safe R	October 31, 2016

==== Results ====
New Jersey's 7th congressional district, 2016
Party	Candidate	Votes	%
Republican	Leonard Lance (incumbent)	185,850	54.1
Democratic	Peter Jacob	148,188	43.1
Libertarian	Dan O'Neill	5,343	1.6
Independent	Arthur T. Haussmann Jr.	4,254	1.2
Total votes		343,635	100.0
Republican hold			

==== By county ====
County	Leonard Lance Republican		Peter Jacob Democratic		Various candidates Other parties		Margin		Total votes cast
County	#	%	#	%	#	%	#	%	Total votes cast
Essex (part)	3,765	42.1%	5,022	56.2%	147	1.7%	-1,257	-14.1%	8,934
Hunterdon	40,529	59.9%	23,614	34.9%	3,493	5.2%	16,915	25.0%	67,636
Morris (part)	30,116	57.3%	21,297	40.5%	1,123	2.1%	8,819	16.8%	52,536
Somerset (part)	59,306	52.8%	50,316	44.8%	2,772	2.5%	8,990	8.0%	112,394
Union (part)	43,056	49.5%	41,417	48.8%	1,449	1.7%	639	0.7%	86,922
Warren	9,078	59.7%	5,522	36.3%	613	4.0%	3,556	23.4%	15,213
Totals	185,850	54.1%	148,188	43.1%	9,597	2.8%	37,662	11.0%	343,635

== District 8 ==
2016 New Jersey's 8th congressional district election
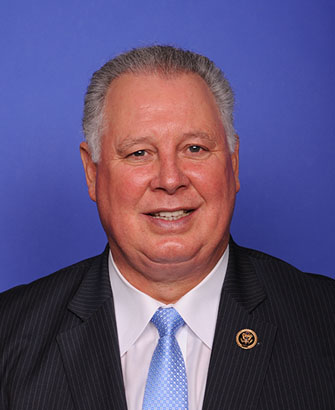

Nominee	Albio Sires	Agha Khan
Party	Democratic	Republican
Popular vote	134,733	32,337
Percentage	77.0%	18.5%
- Sires: 60–70% 70–80% 80–90%
U.S. Representative before election
Albio Sires
Democratic
Elected U.S. Representative
Albio Sires
Democratic

Democrat Albio Sires has represented this district since 2007.

=== Democratic primary ===
==== Candidates ====
===== Nominee =====
- Albio Sires, incumbent U.S. Representative

===== Eliminated in primary =====
- Eloy J. Delgado

==== Results ====
Democratic primary results
Party	Candidate	Votes	%
Democratic	Albio Sires (incumbent)	45,988	86.9
Democratic	Eloy J. Delgado	6,933	13.1
Total votes		52,921	100.0

=== Republican primary ===
==== Candidates ====
===== Nominee =====
- Agha Khan

==== Results ====
Republican primary results
Party	Candidate	Votes	%
Republican	Agha Khan	4,679	100.0
Total votes		4,679	100.0

=== General election ===
==== Endorsements ====
Albio Sires (D)

Labor unions

- AFL-CIO

==== Predictions ====
Source	Ranking	As of
The Cook Political Report	Safe D	November 7, 2016
Daily Kos Elections	Safe D	November 7, 2016
Rothenberg	Safe D	November 3, 2016
Sabato's Crystal Ball	Safe D	November 7, 2016
RCP	Safe D	October 31, 2016

==== Results ====
New Jersey's 8th congressional district, 2016
Party	Candidate	Votes	%
Democratic	Albio Sires (incumbent)	134,733	77.0
Republican	Agha Khan	32,337	18.5
Independent	Pablo Olivera	4,381	2.5
Libertarian	Dan Delaney	3,438	2.0
Total votes		174,889	100.0
Democratic hold			

==== By county ====
County	Albio Sires Democratic		Agha Khan Republican		Various candidates Other parties		Margin		Total votes cast
County	#	%	#	%	#	%	#	%	Total votes cast
Bergen (part)	2,156	71.7%	748	24.9%	102	3.4%	1,408	46.8%	3,006
Essex (part)	24,465	78.8%	5,057	16.3%	1,544	4.9%	19,408	62.5%	31,066
Hudson (part)	89,305	75.8%	23,069	19.6%	5,417	4.6%	66,236	54.2%	117,791
Union (part)	18,807	81.7%	3,463	15.0%	756	3.3%	15,344	66.7%	23,026
Totals	134,733	77.0%	32,337	18.5%	7,819	4.5%	102,396	58.5%	174,889

== District 9 ==
2016 New Jersey's 9th congressional district election
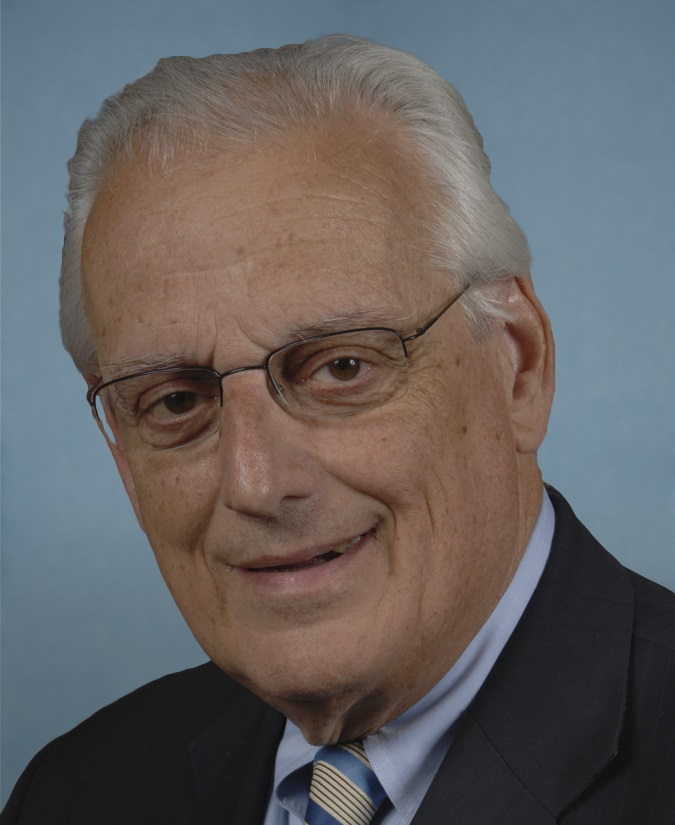

Nominee	Bill Pascrell	Hector L. Castillo
Party	Democratic	Republican
Popular vote	162,642	65,376
Percentage	69.8%	28.0%
- Pascrell: 50–60% 60–70% 70–80% 80–90% >90%
U.S. Representative before election
Bill Pascrell
Democratic
Elected U.S. Representative
Bill Pascrell
Democratic

Democratic Bill Pascrell has represented this district since 1997.

=== Democratic primary ===
==== Candidates ====
===== Nominee =====
- Bill Pascrell, incumbent U.S. Representative

===== Withdrew =====
- Jeff Jones, former mayor of Paterson

==== Results ====
Democratic primary results
Party	Candidate	Votes	%
Democratic	Bill Pascrell Jr. (incumbent)	47,671	100.0
Total votes		47,671	100.0

=== Republican primary ===
==== Candidates ====
===== Nominee =====
- Hector L. Castillo, physician and independent candidate for governor in 2005

==== Results ====
Republican primary results
Party	Candidate	Votes	%
Republican	Hector L. Castillo	12,757	100.0
Total votes		12,757	100.0

=== General election ===
==== Endorsements ====
Bill Pascrell (D)

Labor unions

- AFL-CIO

==== Predictions ====
Source	Ranking	As of
The Cook Political Report	Safe D	November 7, 2016
Daily Kos Elections	Safe D	November 7, 2016
Rothenberg	Safe D	November 3, 2016
Sabato's Crystal Ball	Safe D	November 7, 2016
RCP	Safe D	October 31, 2016

==== Results ====
New Jersey's 9th congressional district, 2016
Party	Candidate	Votes	%
Democratic	Bill Pascrell (incumbent)	162,642	69.8
Republican	Hector L. Castillo	65,376	28.0
Libertarian	Diego Rivera	3,327	1.4
Independent	Jeff Boss	1,897	0.8
Total votes		233,242	100.0
Democratic hold			

==== By county ====
County	Bill Pascrell Democratic		Hector Castillo Republican		Various candidates Other parties		Margin		Total votes cast
County	#	%	#	%	#	%	#	%	Total votes cast
Bergen (part)	81,433	63.7%	43,308	33.9%	3,047	2.4%	38,125	29.8%	127,788
Hudson (part)	7,019	63.6%	3,644	33.0%	371	3.3%	3,375	30.6%	11,034
Passaic (part)	74,190	78.6%	18,424	19.5%	1,806	1.9%	55,766	69.1%	94,420
Totals	162,642	69.7%	65,376	28.0%	5,224	2.2%	97,266	41.7%	233,242

== District 10 ==
2016 New Jersey's 10th congressional district election
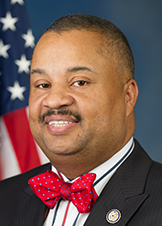

Nominee	Donald Payne Jr.	David H. Pinckney
Party	Democratic	Republican
Popular vote	190,856	26,450
Percentage	85.7%	11.8%
- Payne: 50–60% 60–70% 70–80% 80–90% >90%
U.S. Representative before election
Donald Payne Jr.
Democratic
Elected U.S. Representative
Donald Payne Jr.
Democratic

Democratic Donald Payne Jr. has represented this district since 2013.

=== Democratic primary ===
==== Candidates ====
===== Nominee =====
- Donald Payne Jr., incumbent U.S. Representative

==== Results ====
Democratic primary results
Party	Candidate	Votes	%
Democratic	Donald Payne Jr. (incumbent)	75,175	100.0
Total votes		75,175	100.0

=== Republican primary ===
==== Candidates ====
===== Nominee =====
- David H. Pinckney

==== Results ====
Republican primary results
Party	Candidate	Votes	%
Republican	David H. Pinckney	3,395	100.0
Total votes		3,395	100.0

=== General election ===
==== Endorsements ====
Donald Payne Jr. (D)

Labor unions

- AFL-CIO

==== Predictions ====
Source	Ranking	As of
The Cook Political Report	Safe D	November 7, 2016
Daily Kos Elections	Safe D	November 7, 2016
Rothenberg	Safe D	November 3, 2016
Sabato's Crystal Ball	Safe D	November 7, 2016
RCP	Safe D	October 31, 2016

==== Results ====
New Jersey's 10th congressional district, 2016
Party	Candidate	Votes	%
Democratic	Donald Payne Jr. (incumbent)	190,856	85.7
Republican	David H. Pinckney	26,450	11.8
Independent	Joanne Miller	3,719	1.7
Independent	Aaron Walter Fraser	1,746	0.8
Total votes		222,771	100.0
Democratic hold			

==== By county ====
County	Donald Payne Jr. Democratic		David Pickney Republican		Various candidates Other parties		Margin		Total votes cast
County	#	%	#	%	#	%	#	%	Total votes cast
Essex (part)	119,449	90.7%	9,463	7.2%	2,761	2.1%	109,986	83.5%	131,673
Hudson (part)	32,585	79.8%	6,563	16.1%	1,667	4.1%	26,022	63.7%	40,815
Union (part)	38,822	77.2%	10,424	20.7%	1,037	2.0%	28,398	56.5%	50,283
Totals	190,856	85.7%	26,450	11.9%	5,465	2.5%	164,406	73.8%	222,771

== District 11 ==
2016 New Jersey's 11th congressional district election
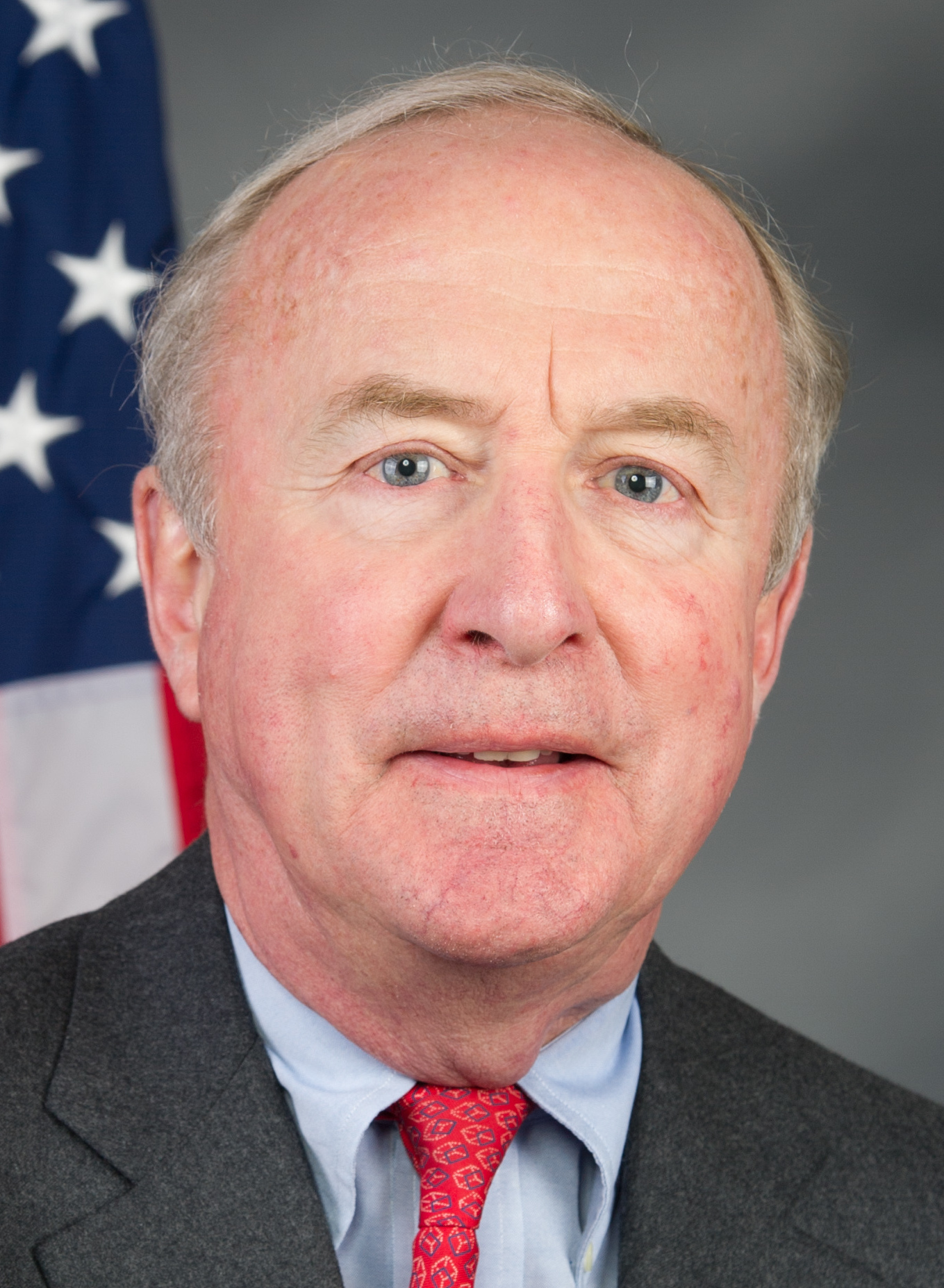

Nominee	Rodney Frelinghuysen	Joseph M. Wenzel
Party	Republican	Democratic
Popular vote	194,299	130,162
Percentage	58.0%	38.9%
- Frelinghuysen: 40–50% 50–60% 60–70% 70–80% Wenzel: 40–50% 50–60% 60–70% 70–80%
U.S. Representative before election
Rodney Frelinghuysen
Republican
Elected U.S. Representative
Rodney Frelinghuysen
Republican

Republican Rodney Frelinghuysen has represented this district since 1995.

=== Republican primary ===
==== Candidates ====
===== Nominee =====
- Rodney Frelinghuysen, incumbent U.S. Representative

===== Eliminated in primary =====
- Rick Van Glahn, home improvement contractor and candidate for this seat in 2014

==== Results ====
Republican primary results
Party	Candidate	Votes	%
Republican	Rodney Frelinghuysen (incumbent)	44,618	76.2
Republican	Rick Van Glahn	13,909	23.8
Total votes		58,527	100.0

=== Democratic primary ===
==== Candidates ====
===== Nominee =====
- Joseph M. Wenzel

===== Eliminated in primary =====
- Lee Anne Brogowski, business analyst and candidate for this seat in 2014
- Richard McFarlane

==== Results ====
Democratic primary results
Party	Candidate	Votes	%
Democratic	Joseph M. Wenzel	34,688	70.4
Democratic	Richard McFarlane	8,751	17.8
Democratic	Lee Anne Brogowski	5,799	11.8
Total votes		49,238	100.0

=== General election ===
==== Endorsements ====
Joseph Wenzel (D)

Labor unions

- AFL-CIO

==== Predictions ====
Source	Ranking	As of
The Cook Political Report	Safe R	November 7, 2016
Daily Kos Elections	Safe R	November 7, 2016
Rothenberg	Safe R	November 3, 2016
Sabato's Crystal Ball	Safe R	November 7, 2016
RCP	Safe R	October 31, 2016

==== Results ====
New Jersey's 11th congressional district, 2016
Party	Candidate	Votes	%
Republican	Rodney Frelinghuysen (incumbent)	194,299	58.0
Democratic	Joseph M. Wenzel	130,162	38.9
Independent	Thomas Depasquale	7,056	2.1
Libertarian	Jeff Hetrick	3,475	1.0
Total votes		334,992	100.0
Republican hold			

==== By county ====
County	Rodney Frelinghuysen Republican		Joseph Wenzel Democratic		Various candidates Other parties		Margin		Total votes cast
County	#	%	#	%	#	%	#	%	Total votes cast
Essex (part)	37,617	47.1%	39,311	49.2%	2,927	3.7%	-1,694	-2.1%	79,855
Morris (part)	109,227	62.4%	62,782	35.9%	3,068	1.7%	46,445	26.5%	175,077
Passaic (part)	31,300	56.7%	20,919	37.9%	2,942	5.3%	10,381	18.8%	55,161
Sussex (part)	16,155	64.9%	7,150	28.7%	1,594	6.4%	9,005	36.2%	24,899
Totals	194,299	58.0%	130,162	38.9%	10,531	3.1%	64,137	19.1%	334,992

== District 12 ==
2016 New Jersey's 12th congressional district election
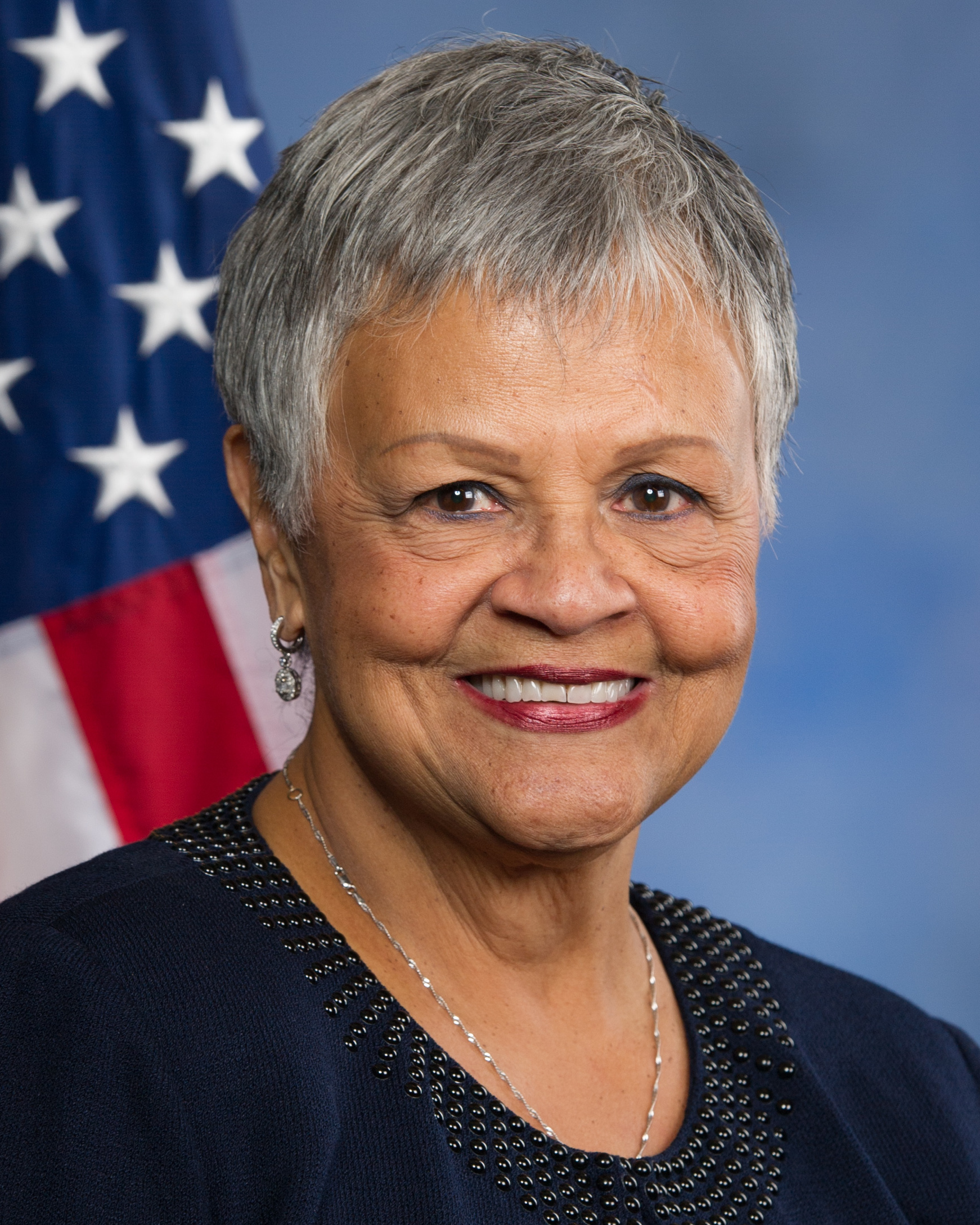

Nominee	Bonnie Watson Coleman	Steven J. Uccio
Party	Democratic	Republican
Popular vote	181,430	92,407
Percentage	62.9%	32.0%
- Watson Coleman: 40–50% 50–60% 60–70% 70–80% 80–90% Uccio: 40–50% 50–60%
U.S. Representative before election
Bonnie Watson Coleman
Democratic
Elected U.S. Representative
Bonnie Watson Coleman
Democratic

Democrat Bonnie Watson Coleman has represented this district since 2015.

=== Democratic primary ===
==== Candidates ====
===== Nominee =====
- Bonnie Watson Coleman, incumbent U.S. Representative

===== Eliminated in primary =====
- Alexander J. Kucsma

==== Results ====
Democratic primary results
Party	Candidate	Votes	%
Democratic	Bonnie Watson Coleman (incumbent)	66,479	93.6
Democratic	Alexander J. Kucsma	4,525	6.4
Total votes		71,004	100.0

=== Republican primary ===
==== Candidates ====
===== Nominee =====
- Steven J. Uccio

==== Results ====
Republican primary results
Party	Candidate	Votes	%
Republican	Steven J. Uccio	18,640	100.0
Total votes		18,640	100.0

=== General election ===
==== Endorsements ====
Bonnie Watson Coleman (D)

Labor unions

- AFL-CIO

==== Predictions ====
Source	Ranking	As of
The Cook Political Report	Safe D	November 7, 2016
Daily Kos Elections	Safe D	November 7, 2016
Rothenberg	Safe D	November 3, 2016
Sabato's Crystal Ball	Safe D	November 7, 2016
RCP	Safe D	October 31, 2016

==== Results ====
New Jersey's 12th congressional district, 2016
Party	Candidate	Votes	%
Democratic	Bonnie Watson Coleman (incumbent)	181,430	62.9
Republican	Steven J. Uccio	92,407	32.0
Independent	R. Edward Forchion	6,094	2.1
Independent	Robert Shapiro	2,775	1.0
Libertarian	Thomas Fitzpatrick	2,482	0.9
Green	Steven Welzer	2,135	0.7
Independent	Michael R. Bollentin	1,311	0.4
Total votes		288,634	100.0
Democratic hold			

==== By county ====
County	Bonnie Watson Coleman Democratic		Steven Uccio Republican		Various candidates Other parties		Margin		Total votes cast
County	#	%	#	%	#	%	#	%	Total votes cast
Mercer (part)	70,757	70.7%	24,165	24.1%	5,187	5.2%	46,592	46.6%	100,109
Middlesex (part)	68,171	54.7%	50,192	40.2%	6,368	5.1%	12,094	14.5%	124,731
Somerset (part)	22,824	63.5%	10,730	29.8%	2,402	6.6%	12,094	33.7%	35,056
Union (part)	19,678	70.7%	7,320	26.3%	840	2.9%	12,358	44.4%	27,838
Totals	181,430	62.9%	92,407	32.0%	14,797	5.1%	89,023	30.9%	288,634
