= Mark Seal =

American journalist and author

- Born: United States
- Occupations: Journalist, author
- Writing career
- Genres: Journalism, non-fiction

Mark Seal is an American journalist and author.

== Biography ==
Seal worked as a journalist in Texas before becoming a freelance magazine writer in 1984, a contributing editor at Vanity Fair since 2003, and has written and co-written about 15 books. Seal's magazine writings have appeared in Esquire, Playboy, Rolling Stone, Condé Nast Traveler, Golf Digest, Texas Monthly, InStyle, Town & Country, Time, and The New York Times. Prior to 1984 when Seal became a freelance magazine writer, he worked as a reporter at several Texas newspapers, including the Houston Chronicle and The Dallas Morning News.

Seal has collaborated on more than 15 non-fiction books, including Alex Spanos's Sharing the Wealth, Bo Derek's Riding Lessons, and Jerry Speziale's Without a Badge: Undercover in the World's Deadliest Criminal Organization. He has written a number of books including Wildflower: An Extraordinary Life and Untimely Death in Africa (2009), a biography of the adventurous life of African wildlife photographer Joan Root. His 2011 book, The Man in the Rockefeller Suit, is about Christian Gerhartsreiter, the serial imposter who posed as a member of the Rockefeller family in what has been described as one of the longest scams in history. The book was optioned for film in 2013.

== Bibliography ==
=== Primary author ===
- Seal, Mark (2009). Wildflower: An Extraordinary Life and Untimely Death in Africa. New York: Random House.
- — (2011). The Man in the Rockefeller Suit: The Astonishing Rise and Spectacular Fall of a Serial Impostor. New York: Viking.
- — (2016). Raising the Bar: The Life and Work of Gerald D. Hines. Bainbridge Island, Washington: Fenwick Publishing.
- — (2019). The Devil and Harper Lee. Scribd Originals. ISBN 9781645399728.
- — (2021). Leave the Gun, Take the Cannoli: The Epic Story of the Making of The Godfather. Gallery Books. ISBN 9781982158590.
- — (2026). The Many Faces of Johnny Depp. Gallery Books. ISBN 9781668046432.

=== Associate writer ===
- Finding the Champion Within: A Step-by-Step Plan for Reaching Your Full Potential (1997, Caitlyn Jenner)
- The Gospel of Good Success: A Six-Step Program to Spiritual, Emotional and Financial Success (1999, Kirbyjon H. Caldwell)
- Sharing the Wealth: My Story (2002, Alex Spanos)
- Riding Lessons: Everything That Matters in Life I Learned from Horses (2002, Bo Derek)
- Without A Badge: Undercover in the World's Deadliest Criminal Organization (2003, Jerry Speziale)

== See also ==
- Paul Lir Alexander
