= Anthony Camal =

American judoka

Medal record

Men's Judo

Representing USA

S National Championships
| Bronze medal – third place | Bronze | 1989 |

Anthony Camal was an American teacher, high school coach and former firefighter who was a national and international competitor in judo.

Camal was born in New York City on April 21st, 1961 to William and Dora Camal and raised in Inwood, Manhattan. Camal was originally instructed in Judo by his father. Camal earned a bronze medal in the 1989 National Championships in Judo.

Anthony Camal was a seven-time New Jersey state champion in Judo. He won the World Police and Firefighters championships in 2001, and took silver in 2003. Camal has held the Annual Camal Judo North Eastern Championship for at least 14 years. Camal currently serves as the first vice president of the Hudson Yudankashi, a regional body of the United States Judo Association. Camal was also an instructor of Mixed Martial Arts and Jiu-Jitsu.

Camal was a teacher in Little Falls, New Jersey. As a coach he has produced many junior national, senior national and international competitors. Camal received a 2012 Firefighter Award for Valor from the Paterson Fire Department in Paterson, New Jersey. Camal injured his back as a result of his duties as a firefighter.

Camal died on July 29, 2024.
