= Andre Sayegh =

American politician (born 1974)

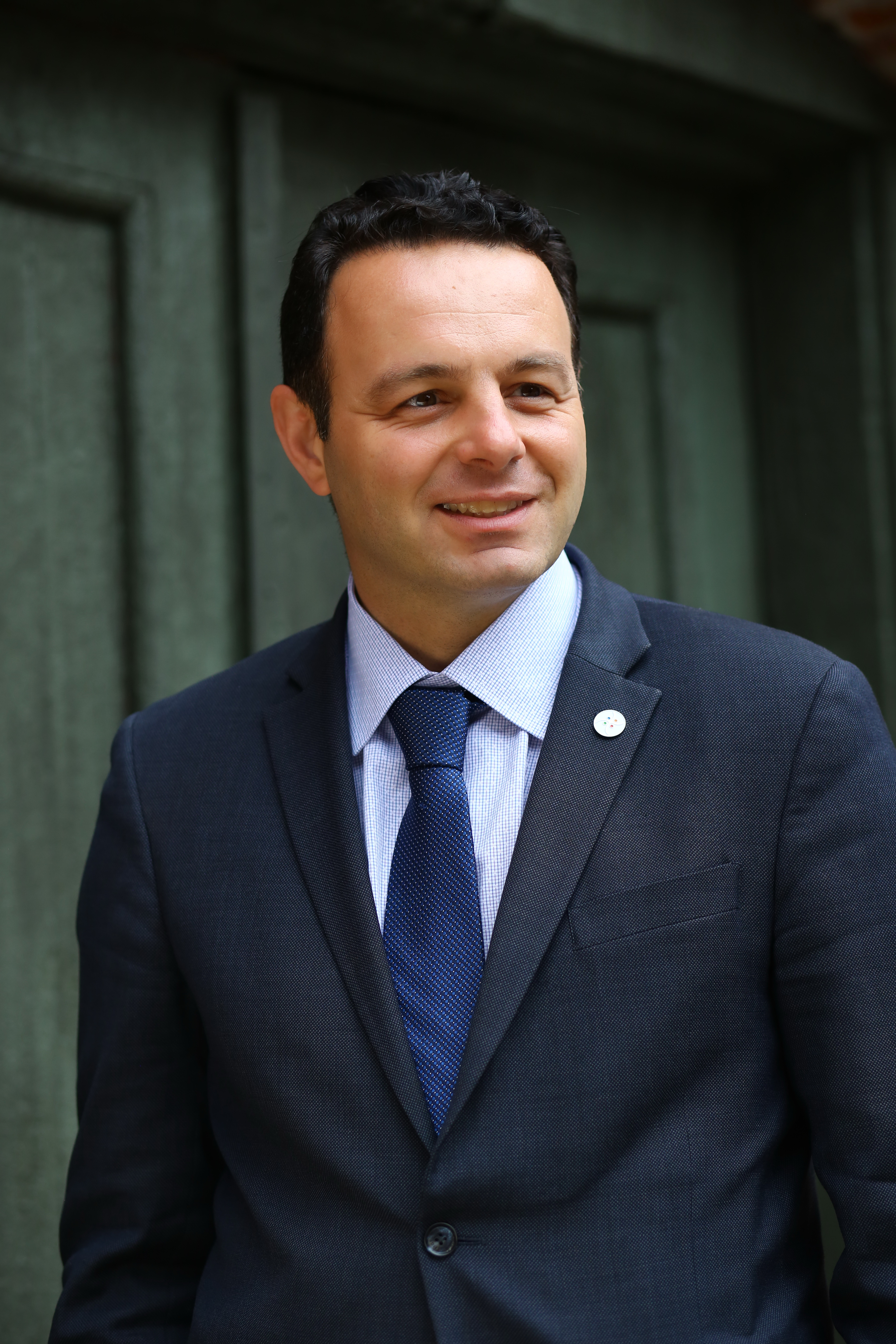

Mayor of Paterson
- Incumbent
- Assumed office July 1, 2018
- Preceded by: Jane Williams-Warren

Personal details
- Born: March 20, 1974 (age 52) Paterson, New Jersey, U.S.
- Party: Democratic
- Spouse: Farhanna Sayegh
- Children: 3
- Education: Seton Hall University (BA); Columbia University (MPA)

Andre Sayegh (born March 20, 1974) is an American politician who has served as the Mayor of Paterson, the third-most populous city in New Jersey, since July 2018. Prior to being elected as Mayor, Sayegh served on the Paterson City Council from 2008 until 2018.

== Biography ==
Andre Sayegh (Arabic: أندريه صايغ) was born in Paterson, the son of a Syrian mother and a Lebanese father. A practicing Catholic, he was raised in the Lakeview neighborhood of Paterson. Sayegh graduated from DePaul Catholic High School in 1992. He graduated from Seton Hall University with a B.A. in History and then earned a M.A. in Public Policy and Administration from Columbia University. Sayegh began his public service by serving on the Paterson school board and then in 2008, as a city councilman representing the 6th Ward. In 2014, he ran for mayor of Paterson but was defeated by Jose Torres. In the 2018 mayoral election, running on a coalition of various groups including Christian and Muslim Arabs, African Americans, Peruvians and other Latinos, he successfully ran for mayor. On May 8, 2018, he was sworn in as Mayor of Paterson succeeding Jane Williams-Warren.

In 2018, Sayegh was selected as one of 40 mayors to participate in the Bloomberg-Harvard City Leadership program. This year-long education and professional development program was designed for mayors to help deliver results to residents. He had the opportunity to learn from other mayors from cities such as Miami, Atlanta, Seattle, Quito, and Reykjavik. As a result of the program, Paterson hired a new Chief Innovation Officer and Chief Data Officer, funded by the Taub Foundation. Sayegh identified best practices from his fellow mayors and launched the Financial Empowerment Center and Mayors for a Guaranteed Income. In Jan 2022, Bloomberg Philanthropies announced Paterson as one of 15 winning cities of the 2021-2022 Global Mayors Challenge, a worldwide innovation competition. Paterson's RealFix was awarded one million dollars in addition to technical support and coaching over three years.

One of the first grants secured during the Sayegh administration was Paterson’s entry into a 2019 national campaign to expand access to parks across the city.

Getting a complete and accurate count for the Census was a major initiative in the Sayegh administration in 2020. This required creating a "Complete Count Committee" coalescing all the demographics groups in the city to fill out the Census survey. The census determined that Paterson had surpassed 150,000 residents, earning the designation of first-class city for the first time. A first class city receives additional grant funding and resources.

As of 2020, Paterson is receiving an investment through $139 million in state tax credits. The Sayegh administration identified several transformative projects such as reviving Hinchliffe Stadium, one of only two ballparks still standing that hosted Negro league baseball games. The funding also supported an affordable housing initiative for senior citizens entitled "Grandparents Raising Grandchildren" will provide 76 units for this vulnerable population. To enhance the appeal of the Great Falls, in cooperation with the Hamilton Partnership for Paterson and Devco, a visitors center named for Paterson's founder, Alexander Hamilton, is under construction with support of the grant.

Recent work includes managing the impact of the COVID-19 pandemic while simultaneously driving economic development. Sayegh mobilized city resources to drive COVID-19 testing, provide PPE to essential front-line workers. The City of Paterson earned national recognition for its successful contact tracing program.

On June 11, 2022 a Paterson Police officer, Jerry Moravek, shot unarmed 28-year-old Khalif Cooper in the back. Andre Sayegh came out in support of the officer and made a statement that several guns and shell casings were found at the scene. This statement was also backed up further by Passaic County authorities that said Khalif Cooper had a gun. The Attorney General’s Office came out and refuted that claim and showed that Khalif Cooper was unarmed. Attorney General Matt Platkin announced that Jerry Moravek has been charged with assault after reviewing statements and body-worn camera footage.

== Mayoral initiatives and accomplishments ==
During his tenure as mayor of Paterson, Andre Sayegh has overseen a range of economic development, public health, and community revitalization initiatives. His administration has been associated with significant investment in infrastructure, including more than $100 million in upgrades to parks, recreational facilities, and public spaces, as well as the reduction of abandoned properties by over 80 percent.

The city has also secured substantial external funding during his tenure, including tens of millions of dollars in grants and nearly $1 billion in economic development projects aimed at revitalization and housing.

Sayegh’s administration has emphasized innovation and financial empowerment initiatives. Following participation in the Bloomberg-Harvard City Leadership Initiative, Paterson launched programs such as a Financial Empowerment Center and participated in the Mayors for a Guaranteed Income effort. The city was also awarded $1 million through the Bloomberg Philanthropies Global Mayors Challenge for its “RealFix” program addressing substance use disorder.

In economic and cultural development, the administration supported major projects including the restoration of Hinchliffe Stadium, a historic Negro league ballpark, and initiatives to enhance the area surrounding the Great Falls National Historical Park.

During the COVID-19 pandemic, the city implemented testing, contact tracing, and public health outreach efforts that received national recognition. Additionally, the administration led efforts to increase census participation, contributing to population growth that resulted in Paterson being designated a first-class city, unlocking additional funding opportunities.

== Jameek Lowery case ==
In January 2019, prior to an ambulance ride, Lowery posted two Facebook Live videos from the police headquarters in which he claimed that the police were trying to kill him. “I’m just paranoid. I’m not touching nobody,” he says.

The City of Paterson faced protests after the death of Jameek Lowery following a police interaction. Sayegh claimed Lowery had bacterial meningitis, but Lowery's mother Patrice King disputed this. She confronted Sayegh at a City Council meeting. Sayegh launched an audit of the police department and promised to equip police officers with body worn cameras. The Paterson Police Department then became the first in New Jersey to deploy body camera analytics.

=== State takeover of police department ===
The New Jersey Attorney General took over control of the Paterson Police Department on March 27, 2023, after the fatal police shooting of Najee Seabrooks. Attorney General Matthew Platkin criticized the "revolving door" of police leadership in Paterson, which has resulted in dysfunction within police ranks and a lack of trust in local law enforcement. Platkin's comments alluded to the challenges created by frequent turnover at the top of the police department and the negative impact it has had on community relations. Sayegh fired two police chiefs Troy Oswald in 2020 and Mike Baycora in 2022.

== Personal life ==
Sayegh speaks Arabic. He is married to Farhanna Sayegh and has two daughters and a son.
