= Jane Williams-Warren =

American politician

Mayor of Paterson, New Jersey
- In office October 10, 2017 – July 1, 2018
- Preceded by: Ruby Cotton (interim mayor)
- Succeeded by: Andre Sayegh

Personal details
- Born: 1947 (age 78–79)

Jane Williams-Warren (born 1947) served as the second female African-American mayor of Paterson, New Jersey, from 2017 to 2018.

== Biography ==
Williams-Warren was born in 1947 in Paterson where she was also raised. She attended Eastside High School.

She started working for the city of Paterson in 1966. She served as City Clerk of Paterson for 24 years and retired in 2014. She was the first African-American to serve as the president of the Municipal Clerks’ Association of New Jersey. On September 29, 2017, after being coaxed out of retirement, she was appointed mayor of Paterson by the City Council in a 5-4 vote to replace interim mayor and City Council president Ruby Cotton who had replaced former mayor Jose “Joey” Torres after his conviction for corruption. Williams-Warren was seen as a politically neutral choice compared to Cotton, Paterson's first African-American female mayor, who had succeeded to mayor by virtue of being council president. She was sworn in on October 10, 2017. She agreed to serve as mayor until the next mayor was sworn in after the general election in May 2018. While mayor, she deferred her $97,500 state pension while she collected her $119,000 salary.

On July 1, 2018, after the general election, she was succeeded by Andre Sayegh, Paterson's first Arab-American mayor.

== See also ==
- List of first African-American mayors
