= Martin G. Barnes =

American politician (1948–2012)

Mayor of Paterson, New Jersey
- In office January 8, 1997 – July 1, 2002
- Preceded by: Bill Pascrell
- Succeeded by: Joey Torres

Personal details
- Born: March 15, 1948
- Died: December 28, 2012 (aged 64)
- Party: Republican

Martin G. "Marty" Barnes (March 15, 1948 – December 28, 2012) was an American Republican Party politician from Paterson, New Jersey. He served as mayor of Paterson, New Jersey for five years. He was the first African-American mayor in Paterson's history.

== Early life and education ==
Raised in Paterson, Barnes graduated from Eastside High School and Seton Hall University.

== Personal life ==
Martin and his spouse, Diane Barnes, reared two sons, Gregory Barnes and Marcus Barnes, and a daughter, Antoinette Barnes.

== Electoral history ==
Prior to his time as mayor, Barnes served as a city councilman from Paterson's 3rd Ward; he was first elected to the City Council in 1974. While serving as councilman, Barnes also ran for the New Jersey state legislature three times. He first did so in 1983, losing in the Republican primary for one of the General Assembly seats in District 35. With an open seat in the 1987 election, Barnes ran again and won the GOP nomination, only to finish behind incumbent John Girgenti and fellow Patersonian Bill Pascrell. Barnes’ last attempt came in 1991 when he ran alongside incumbent Republican Frank Catania to try to take Pascrell's seat; while his running mate retained his seat, Barnes finished behind both incumbents.

After being re-elected five times by his Third Ward constituents, most recently in 1994, Barnes rose to the mayoral seat in 1997. Pascrell, who had been serving as mayor since July 1990 concurrently with his Assembly duties, ran for and won a seat in Congress in 1996, which resulted in a vacancy once he was sworn in on January 3, 1997. Five days later, the council met to vote on a replacement and Barnes was appointed to the office.

In November 1997, Barnes ran in a special election for the remainder of Pascrell's term, which was to run until July 1998. Facing off against City Council President Joey Torres, Barnes won the special election easily and then ran for and won a full term in the municipal election the following May, with only token opposition running against him. He was the first Republican elected mayor by Paterson voters since Lawrence "Pat" Kramer was elected in 1978, although Paterson's elections are not conducted on a partisan basis.

Barnes’ mayoralty was marred by corruption which would eventually result in him facing federal charges. In 2002, despite his legal troubles, Barnes campaigned for a second full term as mayor. This time, however, he faced much tougher competition as he was opposed by Joey Torres, Second Ward Councilman Aslon Goow, former Assembly candidate William Kline, and physician and future congressional candidate Hector Castillo. Barnes finished second in the five-way race behind Torres, garnering approximately 29% of the vote, and did not run for elective office again.

== Controversy ==
Near the end of Barnes' term, he was included in a statewide investigation of corruption in several cities. The investigation led to a forty-count indictment of Barnes handed down by United States Attorney Chris Christie on January 25, 2002. In announcing the indictment, Christie cited, among other things, Barnes' forcing of contractors to pay for trips he took while mayor and providing "female companions" to accompany him. Barnes also was charged with extortion and graft, the latter due to his dealings with an Irvington, New Jersey paving contractor who had earned $16 million in city contracts. It was largely through his dealings with this contractor, United Gunite, that the investigation into Barnes deepened, as the firm had been accused of paying bribes to many municipal officials statewide.

Barnes initially denied the charges and promised to fight them vigorously, but his declarations of innocence garnered him no sympathy from the voters and resulted in his aforementioned May 2002 defeat. In July 2002, shortly after Barnes left office, he entered into a plea bargain with the federal government which resulted in a 37-month prison sentence in 2003. Although he was admitting guilt, presiding Judge William Bassler did not believe that Barnes had taken full responsibility for his actions. Bassler specifically noted that Barnes blamed his crimes on overwork, and getting "caught up" in city politics, for his inability to see that what he was doing was wrong. In sentencing, Bassler said that Barnes had betrayed the trust of the citizens of Paterson, the city, and his family with his conduct. Lead witness and contractor in question motivations were questioned by Barnes supporters. This claim may have some merit as Gerald David Free was in cooperation with the government to offset his own conviction. Gerald David Free was a United Gunite employee featured in a CBS episode of 60 Minutes, in which he tried to force a man to take cash by stuffing a $100 bill in his pocket stating, "I meant to take you to lunch anyway". The man refused. Soon after the episode, Gerald David Free was charged and convicted of bribery, later becoming a federal informant that helped convict various politicians. There were many of Mayor Barnes' charges in question such as female companionship he was alleged to have while he was with his wife on trips, the fact that the alleged "United Gunite gifted pool" exited 7 years earlier, also that the disgraced Mayor was never convicted of a crime connected to office which gave him the option to hold office again.

== Death ==
On December 28, 2012, Barnes died in his Pennsylvania home he shared with his wife and son Gregory and daughter Antoinette. He was 64 years old and was finalized at St. Theresa Catholic Church in Paterson.

== Legacy ==
A nonprofit organization was created in his honor, "Friends of Marty Barnes", raising money for charitable causes.

== See also ==
- List of mayors of Paterson, New Jersey
