= Leave the Gun, Take the Cannoli =

2021 book by Mark Seal

Leave the Gun, Take the Cannoli: The Epic Story of the Making of The Godfather
- First edition
- Author: Mark Seal
- Language: English
- Publisher: Gallery Books
- Publication date: October 19, 2021
- Media type: Print
- Pages: 448pp
- ISBN: 9781982158590

Leave the Gun, Take the Cannoli: The Epic Story of the Making of The Godfather is a non-fiction book written by Mark Seal detailing the making of the Academy Award-winning film, The Godfather.

== Background ==
Mario Puzo's The Godfather remained on The New York Times Best Seller list for 67 weeks and sold over nine million copies in two years. Published in 1969, it became the best-selling published work in history for several years. Paramount Pictures offered Puzo a $12,500 option for the work, with an option for $80,000 if the finished work were made into a film. Despite Puzo's agent telling him to turn down the offer, Puzo was desperate for money and accepted the deal. Paramount's Robert Evans relates that, when they met in early 1968, he offered Puzo the $12,500 deal for the 60-page manuscript titled Mafia after the author confided in him that he urgently needed $10,000 to pay off gambling debts.

== Synopsis ==
Leave the Gun, Take the Cannoli begins as Mario Puzo's novel is adapted into a screenplay for Paramount Pictures. Exploring the casting, filming, and location scouting, this book explores filmmaking. The Italian Mafia, trying to control their depiction in the film, put pressure on the filmmakers. Some members of the Mafia took offense at the way they were portrayed in the novel and wanted to change their character in the movie.

== Reception ==
The book has received positive reviews. The Kirk Center calls the book fantastic. The Washington Post claims the book has "joyful energy, extensive research and breathless enthusiasm". The Washington Times says that the book is nearly as dramatic as the film itself.

== Bibliography ==
- Jones, Jenny M. (2007). The Annotated Godfather: The Complete Screenplay. New York, New York: Black Dog & Leventhal. ISBN 978-1-57912-739-8. Archived from the original on October 25, 2015.
- Lebo, Harlan (2005). The Godfather Legacy: The Untold Story of the Making of the Classic Godfather Trilogy Featuring Never-Before-Published Production Stills. London, England: Simon & Schuster. ISBN 978-0-7432-8777-7. Archived from the original on November 9, 2015.
- Phillips, Gene D. (2004). Godfather: The Intimate Francis Ford Coppola. Lexington, Kentucky: University Press of Kentucky. ISBN 978-0-8131-4671-3. Archived from the original on June 29, 2020.
