= Peregrin Sandford =

American politician

Peregrin Sandford (March 23, 1796 - November 15, 1884) was the Mayor of Paterson, New Jersey from 1857 to 1858.

== Biography ==
He was born March 23, 1796, near Bloomingdale, New Jersey. He was the Mayor of Paterson, New Jersey from 1857 to 1858. He died on November 15, 1884. He was buried at Cedar Lawn Cemetery in Paterson, New Jersey.
