= Mayors of Paterson, New Jersey =

The following is a list of mayors of Paterson, New Jersey.

Year	Image	Mayor	Party
1854		John J. Brown	Whig
1855		Brant Van Blarcom	Democrat
1856		Samuel Smith	Democrat
1857–1858		Peregrin Sandford (1796–1884)	Democrat
1860–1861		Edwin T. Prall	Republican
1862–1865		Henry A. Williams	Republican
1866		William G. Watson	Democrat
1867		Henry A. Williams	Republican
1868		Nathaniel Townsend	Democrat
1869–1870		John Ryle (1817–1887)	Democrat
1871–1872		Socrates Tuttle (1819–1885)	Republican
1873–1874		Nathaniel Townsend	Democrat
1875–1878		Benjamin Buckley	Republican
1879–1880		Joseph R. Graham	Democrat
1881–1882		David S. Gillmor	Republican
1883–1886		Nathan Barnert (1838–1927)	Democrat
1887–1888		Charles Dyer Beckwith (1838-1921)	Republican
1889–1890		Nathan Barnert (1838–1927)	Democrat
1891–1892		Thomas Beveridge	Republican
1893–1896		Christian Braun	Democrat
1897–1903		John Hinchliffe	Democrat
1904–1905		William Henry Belcher (1851-?)	Republican
1905		David Young	(Acting Mayor)
1906–1907		John Johnson	Democrat
1907		William Berdan	(Acting Mayor)
1908–1913		Andrew Francis McBride (1869–1946)	Democrat
1914–1915		Robert H. Fordyce (1856-1928)	Republican
1916–1919		Amos Henry Radcliffe (1870–1950)	Republican
1919		Clifford L. Newman	(Acting Mayor)
1920–1923		Frank J. Van Noort	Democrat
1924–1927		Colin M. McLean	Republican
1928		Raymond J. Newman	Democrat
1928		Wilmer A. Cadmus	(Acting Mayor)
1929–1937		John V. Hinchliffe	Democrat
1938–1939		Bernard L. Stafford	Democrat
1940–1947		William P. Furrey	Republican
1948–1951		Michael U. DeVita	Democrat
1952–1955		Lester F. Titus	Republican
1956–1959		Edward J. O'Byrne (1904–1959)	Democrat
1960		William H. Dillistin	(Acting Mayor)
1961–1966		Frank Xavier Graves, Jr. (1923–1990)	Democrat
1967–1971		Lawrence Francis Kramer (1934–2023)	Republican
1971–1972		Arthur C. Dwyer	(Acting Mayor)
1972–1975		Thomas Rooney	Democrat
1975–1982		Lawrence Francis Kramer (1934–2023)	Republican
1982–1990		Frank Xavier Graves, Jr. (1923–1990)	Democrat
1990		Anna Lisa Dopirak	(Acting Mayor)
1990–1997		William Pascrell, Jr. (1937–2024)	Democrat
1997–2002		Martin G. Barnes (1948–2012)	Republican
2002–2010		Jose "Joey" Torres (born 1958)	Democrat
2010–2014		Jeffery Jones (born 1958)	Democrat
2014–2017		Jose "Joey" Torres (born 1958)	Democrat
2017–2017		Ruby Cotton (interim mayor)	Democrat
2017–2018		Jane Williams-Warren (born 1947)	Democrat
2018–		Andre Sayegh (born 1974)	Democrat
