= Joey Torres =

American politician (born 1958)

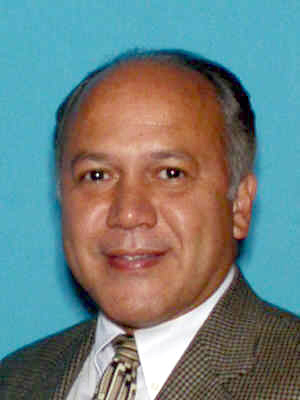
- Mayor Torres in NJ DMV photo

Mayor of Paterson
- In office July 1, 2014 – September 25, 2017
- Preceded by: Jeffery Jones
- Succeeded by: Ruby Cotton (acting)
- In office July 1, 2002 – July 1, 2010
- Preceded by: Martin G. Barnes
- Succeeded by: Jeffery Jones

Council member Paterson City Council
- In office July 1, 1990 – July 1, 2000

Personal details
- Born: 1958 or 1959 (age 67–68) Paterson, New Jersey, U.S.
- Party: Democratic
- Education: Rutgers University

Jose "Joey" Torres (born 1958) is an American politician who served as mayor of Paterson, New Jersey, the third-largest city in New Jersey. Torres served two terms as mayor between 2002 and 2010 and had previously served five terms as a city council member. He was again elected May 13 and was sworn in July 1, 2014. He pled guilty to corruption charges on September 22, 2017, and was forced to step down from his mayoral position. Torres was succeeded by Ruby Cotton, the president of the city council, and was replaced by retired city clerk Jane Williams-Warren on October 10, 2017.

== Background ==
Torres is Puerto Rican, born and raised in Paterson. He is the youngest of eight children of Juan Torres, who had migrated to the city in 1949, and Catalina Torres. The family lived in the Christopher Columbus public housing and owned and operated bodega businesses. He is married to Sonia Torres, who ran in a special election to represent of the 2nd Ward of city's council in 2012.

== Political office ==
Torres first won a seat on Paterson's city council in 1990 after having previously run five times. He served on the City Council for five terms. He later became the purchasing agent for the city's housing authority.

Torres first became mayor in 2002, winning the seat from Republican incumbent Martin G. Barnes, and won a re-election bid in 2006. He was defeated in by Jeff Jones in 2010. He became the first Latino mayor of the city, which has a Hispanic-Latino majority. Torres was a member of Mayors Against Illegal Guns (MAIG).

Torres ran for election as an independent in the 2014 mayoral race which took place on May 13, 2014. He won the seat garnering 8,069. votes, in an election in which 22,896, or 30%, of the city's 76,059 registered voters participated. Voting was characterised an unprecedented 2,413 mail-in votes, almost 800 more than the total absentee ballots cast in the previous three elections combined and more than twice as many as in 2010. Torres received 930 of the absentee ballots, 38.5 percent of the total and more than twice as many as any other candidate. The mayor's salary was set at $119,000 per year after approval by the New Jersey Department of Community Affairs. Torres collected $4,152 more than his salary from July 1 through December 5, 2014 in erroneous payments. He returned much of the erroneous payments after payroll clerks discovered the error and made his final payment after it was exposed in a local newspaper.

In 2015, Torres created the position of "deputy mayor", which are multiple, unofficial and unpaid. Their role is to advise the mayor on various aspects of city planning and to act as liaisons to Paterson's various ethnic communities.

== Fines and vacation payments ==
In 2012, Torres was fined $14,350 by Election Law Enforcement Commission for failing to include information on donors (names, occupations, employers and addresses) to his campaign for election in 2010. In 2017, he was sentenced to 5 years of prison for paying local construction workers to do personal work for him.

In January 2014, a 26-page report compiled by the city council reviewed payments made to Torres regarding salary payment irregularities. On July 29, 2008, Torres had written a memo to the city's treasurer "requesting a paycheck for ten (10) vacation days from 2007". In March 2014, he returned $2,238 that he received in 2008 from $3,169 he claimed, saying it was a payroll error.

During his last week in office in 2010, Torres received $73,996 lump sum payment claimed for sick leave and vacation time. The city council asked that the funds be returned and questioned whether such a payment was legal or ethical. Torres said he was willing to repay the money only if the New Jersey Attorney General's office or the Passaic County prosecutor's office found wrongdoing.

== Bunker Hill SID and Jackson Township administrator ==
After Torres' defeat in the mayoral election he was appointed business administrator for the municipal government of Jackson Township on Ocean County, New Jersey. Amid criticism that he had abandoned the position to campaign and to take up his role as mayor of Paterson, he resigned on May 30, 2014. Based on his work there, Torres is collecting a $68,000 pension.

He was also appointed director of the Bunker Hill Special Improvement District, a business improvement district and Urban Enterprise Zone, established in 1994 in the Bunker Hill neighborhood, a mostly industrial area in the northwest of city along the Passaic River. In May 2014 Torres said he would discuss resignation from the position after being sworn-in as mayor. After his resignation the position was taken up by his wife Sonia.

== Retiree/Employee compensation controversy ==
As of 2014, Torres receives a full-time annual salary of $119,000 as mayor. He also receives free health coverage as a retiree based on his pension, due to the fact that the New Jersey treasury department approved his retirement and pension. Torres filed his pension application in May, one week after winning the mayoral election, at a time when he was working as business administrator in Jackson Township. The state approved a $68,000 annual pension for Torres that took effect June 1 and was based on 29 years and eight months of cumulative service time in his jobs with Jackson Township, the City of Paterson and the Paterson Housing Authority. The situation has led to questions about how he can be an employee and retiree of the city at the same time. In August 2020, Torres requested his health insurance be paid with public funding.

== Investigation of misuse of municipal workers, grand jury indictment and conviction ==
In March 2016, WNBC 4 NY (Channel 4) broadcast surveillance videos obtained from Harry Melber of AHM Investigations, Melber and his son Nicholas of Premier Enterprise Services, LLC. another NJ Private Investigators firm (formed after the investigation of the mayor), were the main investigators on the team who took video and carried out the investigation. The videos showed Paterson municipal employees conducting work at Torres’ personal home and the business of a relative which led to coverage in other press and the start of a state investigation. Salary records show the workers each received considerable overtime payments.

In February 2017, the FBI subpoenaed all records relating to work conducted at Torres' home since 2012.

Torres and three public works supervisors: Joseph Mania, Timothy Hanlon and Imad Mowaswes were indicted on March 7, 2017 on charges of second-degree official misconduct, pattern of official misconduct, third-degree theft by unlawful taking or disposition, tampering with public records or information and fourth-degree falsifying or tampering with records.

Torres was indicted on corruption charges on March 7, 2017. The charges came amid several investigative reports by WNBC 4 NY. The investigation of misuse of municipal workers began with broadcast surveillance videos taken by private investigations firm AHM Investigations LLC. Torres turned himself in to New Jersey State Police in Totowa on March 13, 2017.

Torres was arraigned on the charges on April 17, 2017. He pleaded not guilty to the charges in Hudson County Superior Court. He was offered a plea bargain deal. He was later convicted & sentenced.

He pleaded guilty to corruption charges on September 22, 2017 and was forced to step down from his mayoral position.

== See also ==
- Mayors of Paterson, New Jersey
- Luis A. Quintana, the first Latino mayor of Newark
- Jerry Speziale, an appointee
- Joey Torres, elected official
