= Jeffery Jones (mayor) =

Jeffery J Jones
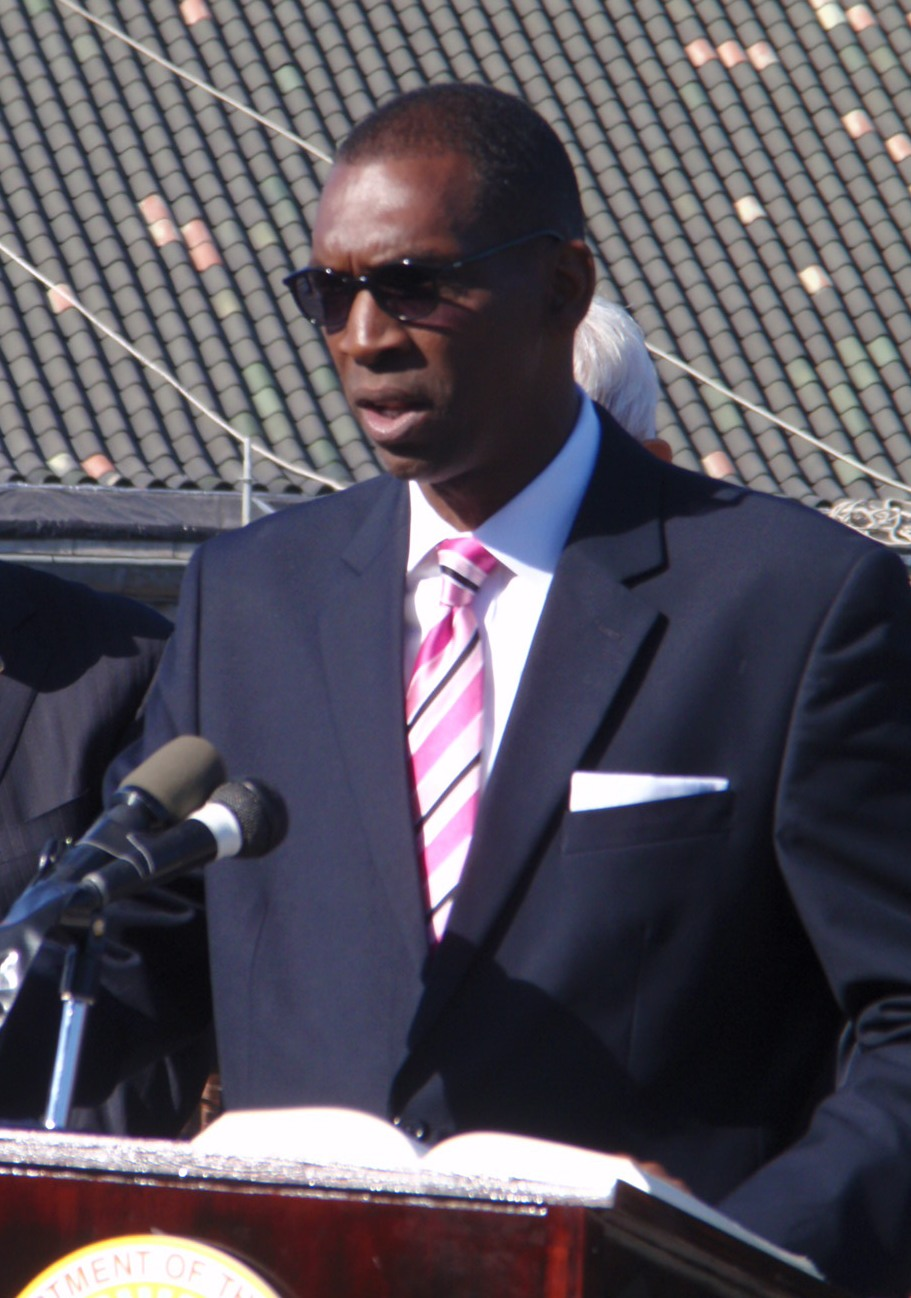

Mayor of Paterson
- In office July 1, 2010 – July 1, 2014
- Preceded by: Joey Torres
- Succeeded by: Joey Torres

Personal details
- Born: February 8, 1958 (age 68) Paterson, New Jersey, U.S.
- Party: Democratic

Jeffery Jones (born February 8, 1958) is the former Mayor of Paterson, the third largest city in New Jersey. He served from 2010 to 2014. The Paterson City Council censured Mayor Jeffery Jones for refusing to testify about why he and top salaried officials received nearly $51,000 in overtime following Hurricane Irene.
