= Paul Lir Alexander =

Brazilian drug lord (born c. 1956)

- Born: c. 1956; Santa Catarina, Brazil
- Other names: El Parito Loco ("The Crazy Duck") "The Baron of Cocaine"
- Occupation: Drug lord
- Known for: Drug trafficking and smuggling
- Criminal charges: Drug trafficking and smuggling
- Criminal status: Fugitive
- Children: María Isabell Rastelly

Paul Lir Alexander, also known as El Parito Loco, is a Brazilian drug lord. He is one of the richest drug lords in Brazil, having a net worth of more than $870 million.

== Biography ==
Alexander was born in Santa Catarina and joined military service in the Israeli Army and the Mossad. He later worked as a Drug Enforcement Administration (DEA) agent before becoming the leader of a drug-smuggling ring in Brazil. He was reported to have been among the wealthiest of Rio de Janeiro's drug lords, with an estimated $20 million in assets, primarily in the form of real estate. Alexander specialized in sending cocaine to the United States inside electrical transformers. He owned various ranches in Brazil, his own business jet, and a yacht worth $25 million. Accounts of his activities describe him as using his apparent cooperation with law enforcement to gather information on rival traffickers while continuing to build his own organization.

Alexander was arrested by the DEA in 1993 and spent 17 years in prison. After serving his sentence in the United States he was deported to Brazil, where he was arrested again and sentenced to 42 years' imprisonment. He later disappeared while on a temporary release from a Brazilian prison in 2010 and has been considered a fugitive since then.
