= Paterson Fire Department =

Emergency services in New Jersey, United States

Operational area
- Country: United States
- State: New Jersey
- City: Paterson

Agency overview
- Established: November 15, 1895
- Annual calls: 45,223 (2014)
- Employees: 410 (2017)
- Staffing: Career
- Fire chief: Alejandro Alicea
- EMS level: BLS

Facilities and equipment
- Divisions: 1
- Battalions: 4
- Stations: 7
- Engines: 7
- Tillers: 1
- Platforms: 2
- Rescues: 1
- Ambulances: 7
- USAR: 1
- Rescue boats: 1
- Light and air: 1

Website
- Official website

The Paterson Fire Department provides fire protection, hazardous materials services, and emergency medical services to the city of Paterson, New Jersey. With a population of 159,732 Paterson is New Jersey's third largest city.

The department is part of the Metro USAR Strike Team, which consists of nine North Jersey fire departments and other emergency services divisions working to address major emergency rescue situations.

== Stations and apparatus ==
As of February 2020 below is a complete listing of all stations and apparatus in the Paterson Fire Department.

Engine Company	Ladder Company	EMS-Ambulance Units	Special/Support/Miscellaneous Units	Chief Units	Battalion	Address	Neighborhood
Engine 1	Tower Ladder 1	EMS-Ambulance Unit 1	EMS Supervisor Car 9, Supply Unit, Spare Apparatus 5		2nd	850 Madison Ave.	Madison Ave.
Engine 2		EMS-Ambulance Unit 2	Spare Apparatus 2, Spare Apparatus 3		3rd	221 Union Ave.	Hillcrest
Engine 3		EMS-Ambulance Unit 3	Haz-Mat 1		1st	127 Trenton Ave.	Lakeview
Engine 4	Tower Ladder 2	EMS-Ambulance Unit 4	Spare Apparatus 4	Battalion 3	3rd	48 Temple St.	Northside
Engine 5	Ladder 3(Tiller)	EMS-Ambulance Unit 5		Battalion 2	2nd	236 Lafayette St.	Riverside
Squad 6		EMS-Ambulance Unit 6	Rescue 2, Rescue 1 (Metro USAR Collapse Rescue Strike Team Unit), Squad 6A (Special Operations Flood Rescue Unit) & Zodiac Boat	Battalion 1	1st	124 Getty Ave.	South Side
Engine 7		EMS-Ambulance Unit 7	Air Cascade Unit, Mobile Command Unit, Arson Investigation Car 68,	Deputy Chief/Tour Commander, Battalion 4(Safety Chief)	3rd	300 McBride Ave.	Stoney Road

=== Disbanded Fire Companies ===
Throughout the history of the Paterson Fire Department, several fire companies have been disbanded due to departmental reorganization, budget, and renumbering. Listed are some recent company changes.

- Engine Company 8 - 221 Union Ave. - Disbanded 2006
- Engine Company 9 - 77 Highland St. - Disbanded 1989
- Engine Company 10 - 236 Lafayette St. - Disbanded 1984
- Engine Company 11 - 97 Grand St. - Disbanded 1982
- Engine Company 12 - 36 Circle Ave. - Disbanded 1982
- Engine Company 13 - 125 Trenton Ave. - Disbanded 1982
- Squad Company 1 - 115 Van Houten St. - Disbanded 1982
- Satellite Unit 9 - 77 Highland St.

== See also ==
- Paterson Police Department
