= Paterson Police Department =

Law enforcement agency of Paterson, New Jersey

- Common name: Paterson Police Department
- Abbreviation: PPD

Agency overview
- Formed: August 1, 1866

Jurisdictional structure
- Operations jurisdiction: Paterson, New Jersey, United States
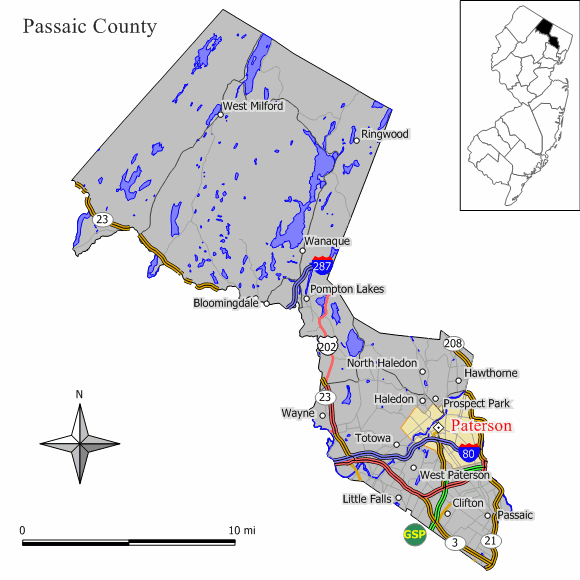
- Map of Paterson in Passaic County. Inset: Passaic County's location in New Jersey.
- Area: 8.6mi²
- Population: 145,647 (2018)
- Legal jurisdiction: Paterson, New Jersey
- General nature: Local civilian police

Operational structure
- Headquarters: 111 Broadway; Paterson, NJ 07505
- Officers: 400
- Unsworn members: 150
- Agency executive: Isa M. Abbassi, Officer in Charge

Website
- patersonpd.org

The Paterson Police Department is the primary law enforcement agency for the city of Paterson, New Jersey. It has about 400 sworn law enforcement officers and 125 support staff. As of March 2023, it is under the control of the Attorney General of New Jersey in response to a series of incidents of misconduct and alleged misconduct, including three controversial shootings.

== History ==
The department began operations on August 1, 1866. Before then, the city was protected by a city marshal and five watchmen, one for each ward.

Eight Paterson policemen have died in the line of duty.

In April 2011, 125 officers, described as "a quarter of the officers" were laid off due to budget problems.

In February 2020, the City Council approved an outside audit of the police department following the arrest of an eighth officer involved in a corruption scandal and the death of an arrestee.

Paterson mayor Andre Sayegh fired police chief Troy Oswald in 2020, and replacement chief Ibrahim Baycora in 2022.

=== State takeover of department ===
The New Jersey Attorney General took over control of the Paterson Police Department on March 27, 2023, after the fatal police shooting of Najee Seabrooks. Attorney General Matthew Platkin criticized the "revolving door" of police leadership in Paterson, which has resulted in dysfunction within police ranks and a lack of trust in local law enforcement. Platkin's comments alluded to the challenges created by frequent turnover at the top of the police department and the negative impact it has had on community relations.

== See also ==
- Paterson Fire Department
