= Michael Horn (politician) =

American politician (born 1939)

Michael M. Horn

Treasurer of New Jersey
- In office March 20, 1984 – January 21, 1986
- Governor: Thomas Kean
- Preceded by: Kenneth Biederman
- Succeeded by: Feather O'Conner

Member of the New Jersey General Assembly
- In office November 16, 1972 – January 8, 1974 Serving with John F. Evers
- Succeeded by: Karl Weidel
- Constituency: District 14C (1972–1974)

Personal details
- Born: July 29, 1939 (age 87) Nutley, New Jersey
- Party: Republican
- Education: Princeton University (BA); Harvard Law School (JD)

Michael M. Horn (born July 29, 1939) is a former American politician who served as the Treasurer of New Jersey from 1984 to 1986. He was also a member of the New Jersey General Assembly, representing District 14C in Essex County from 1972 to 1974.

Born and raised in Nutley, New Jersey, Horn attended Nutley High School, where he lettered in baseball, football and track. He graduated from Princeton University and Harvard Law School, before being admitted to the bar as an attorney.

Horn, who had served as the state's banking commissioner, was a resident of Morris Township, New Jersey.
