= New Jersey's 14th legislative district =

American legislative district

- Senator: Linda R. Greenstein (D)
- Assembly members: Tennille McCoy (D); Wayne DeAngelo (D)
- Registration: 37.27% Democratic; 22.74% Republican; 38.90% unaffiliated
- Demographics: 56.9% White; 8.6% Black/African American; 0.4% Native American; 18.7% Asian; 0.0% Hawaiian/Pacific Islander; 8.0% Other race; 7.5% Two or more races; 15.4% Hispanic
- Population: 234,184
- Voting-age population: 187,321
- Registered voters: 177,324

New Jersey's 14th legislative district is one of 40 in the New Jersey Legislature, covering the Mercer County municipalities of East Windsor Township, Hamilton Township, Hightstown Borough and Robbinsville Township; and the Middlesex County municipalities of Cranbury Township, Jamesburg Borough, Monroe Township, and Plainsboro Township.

== Demographic characteristics ==
As of the 2020 United States census, the district had a population of 234,184, of whom 187,321 (80.0%) were of voting age. The racial makeup of the district was 133,182 (56.9%) White, 20,057 (8.6%) African American, 891 (0.4%) Native American, 43,737 (18.7%) Asian, 71 (0.0%) Pacific Islander, 18,792 (8.0%) from some other race, and 17,454 (7.5%) from two or more races. Hispanic or Latino of any race were 36,123 (15.4%) of the population.

The district had 177,324 registered voters as of December 1, 2021, of whom 69,493 (39.2%) were registered as unaffiliated, 67,738 (38.2%) were registered as Democrats, 37,866 (21.4%) were registered as Republicans, and 2,227 (1.3%) were registered to other parties.

== Political representation ==
For the 2026–2027 session, the 14th legislative district of the New Jersey Legislature is represented in the State Senate by Linda R. Greenstein (D, Plainsboro Township) and in the General Assembly by Wayne DeAngelo (D, Hamilton Township) and Tennille McCoy (D, Hamilton Township).

The legislative district overlaps with the New Jersey's 3rd and 12th congressional districts.

== 1965–1973 ==
In the interim period between the 1964 Supreme Court decision Reynolds v. Sims which required the creation of state legislature districts to be made as equal in population as possible and the 1973 creation of the 40-district map, the 14th district consisted of all of Passaic County. For the Senate, two members were elected at-large in the 1965 election for a two-year term, while three members were elected in 1967 for a four-year term and 1971 for a two-year term.

The members elected to the Senate from this district are as follows:

Session	Senators elected			
1966–1967	2	Anthony J. Grossi (D) (Note: Resigned on June 26, 1967, to join Board of Public Utilities)	Joseph M. Keegan (D)	
1968–1969	3	Ira Schoem (R)	Frank J. Sciro (R)	Edward Sisco (R) (Note: Died March 6, 1971)
1970–1971	3	Ira Schoem (R)	Frank J. Sciro (R)	Edward Sisco (R)
1972–1973	3	Joseph Hirkala (D)	Joseph A. Lazzara (D)	William J. Bate (D)

For the members of the Assembly elected from Passaic County, the election method changed in every general election during this interim period. In 1967, two members were elected at-large from the entire county, while the county was split into three Assembly districts with one member elected from each district. Then in the 1969 election, one member was elected at-large and two Assembly districts in the county each elected two members. The election of 1971 reverted to the original 1967 method of electing Assembly members.

The members elected to the Assembly from each district are as follows:

Session	District 14 at-large	District 14A	District 14B	District 14C
1968–1969	Joseph F. Scancarella (R)	Joseph Hirkala (D)	Augustus T. Capers (D)	John F. Evers (R)
1968–1969	Alfred Fontanella (R)	Joseph Hirkala (D)	Augustus T. Capers (D)	John F. Evers (R)
1970–1971	John F. Evers (R)	Alfred Fontanella (R)	Joseph Hirkala (D)	Seat eliminated
1970–1971	John F. Evers (R)	James White (R)	Joseph F. Scancarella (R)	Seat eliminated
1972–1973	Vincent O. Pellecchia (D)	Herb Klein (D)	William H. Hicks (D)	John F. Evers (R) (Note: Resigned September 13, 1972 to join staff of Gov. William T. Cahill)
1972–1973	John J. Sinsimer (D)	Herb Klein (D)	William H. Hicks (D)	Michael M. Horn (R) (Note: Elected in November 7, 1972 special election, sworn into the Assembly on November 16, 1972)

== District composition since 1973 ==
When the 40-district legislative map was created in 1973, the 14th district originally included municipalities in western Morris County, all of Hunterdon County, New Jersey, save for Readington Township, in Mercer County Ewing Township, Hopewell and Princeton townships and their enclosed boroughs, and Plainsboro and Cranbury townships in Middlesex. It took on a shape similar to its current configuration in 1981 when the 14th stretched from Hamilton, up eastern Mercer County, southwestern Middlesex, and Rocky Hill, Millstone, Manville, and Franklin Township in Somerset County. In the 1991 redistricting, the Somerset County portions of the district were removed but Monroe Township, Jamesburg, and Helmetta were added to the district. Washington Township, East Windsor, Hightstown, and Helmetta were removed from the district in the 2001 redistricting; the Hamilton Township-Middlesex County connection was made through West Windsor Township. East Windsor, Hightstown, and Robbinsville (renamed in 2007 from Washington Township) were restored to the district in the 2011 redistricting, West Windsor and South Brunswick were shifted to other districts, and Spotswood was added to the 14th for the first time. Spotswood was then removed from the district in the 2021 reapportionment, the only map change to the district that year.

== Election history ==
Session	Senate	General Assembly	
1974–1975	Anne Clark Martindell (D) (Note: Resigned May 17, 1977 to accept a federal appointment)	Walter E. Foran (R)	Karl Weidel (R)
1976–1977	Anne Clark Martindell (D)	Walter E. Foran (R) (Note: Elected to the Senate in a November 1977 special election, sworn in on November 21, 1977)	Karl Weidel (R)
1976–1977	Walter E. Foran (R)	Seat vacant	Karl Weidel (R)
1978–1979	Walter E. Foran (R)	Barbara McConnell (D)	Karl Weidel (R)
1980–1981	Walter E. Foran (R)	Barbara McConnell (D)	Karl Weidel (R)
1982–1983	Francis J. McManimon (D)	Joseph D. Patero (D)	Joseph L. Bocchini Jr. (D)
1984–1985	Francis J. McManimon (D)	Joseph D. Patero (D)	Joseph L. Bocchini Jr. (D)
1986–1987	Francis J. McManimon (D)	John K. Rafferty (R)	Joseph L. Bocchini Jr. (D)
1988–1989	Francis J. McManimon (D)	Joseph D. Patero (D)	Anthony J. Cimino (D)
1990–1991	Francis J. McManimon (D)	Joseph D. Patero (D) (Note: Resigned August 22, 1991, to join staff of the Department of Labor)	Anthony J. Cimino (D)
1990–1991	Francis J. McManimon (D)	Peter A. Cantu (D) (Note: Appointed to the Assembly in 1991 to complete unexpired term of Joseph Patero)	Anthony J. Cimino (D)
1992–1993	Peter Inverso (R)	Paul Kramer (R)	Barbara Wright (R)
1994–1995	Peter Inverso (R)	Paul Kramer (R)	Barbara Wright (R)
1996–1997	Peter Inverso (R)	Paul Kramer (R)	Barbara Wright (R)
1998–1999	Peter Inverso (R)	Paul Kramer (R)	Barbara Wright (R)
2000–2001	Peter Inverso (R)	Linda R. Greenstein (D)	Gary Guear (D)
2002–2003	Peter Inverso (R)	Linda R. Greenstein (D)	Gary Guear (D)
2004–2005	Peter Inverso (R)	Linda R. Greenstein (D)	Bill Baroni (R)
2006–2007	Peter Inverso (R)	Linda R. Greenstein (D)	Bill Baroni (R)
2008–2009	Bill Baroni (R) (Note: Resigned March 1, 2010, to become Deputy Executive Director of the Port Authority of New York and New Jersey)	Linda R. Greenstein (D)	Wayne DeAngelo (D)
2010–2011	Bill Baroni (R)	Linda R. Greenstein (D) (Note: Elected to the Senate in November 2010 special election, sworn into the Senate on December 6, 2010)	Wayne DeAngelo (D)
2010–2011	Tom Goodwin (R) (Note: Appointed to the Senate on March 11, 2010 to temporarily fill the seat of Bill Baroni, defeated in November 2010 special election)	Linda R. Greenstein (D)	Wayne DeAngelo (D)
2010–2011	Linda R. Greenstein (D)	Daniel R. Benson (D) (Note: Appointed to the Assembly on January 10, 2011)	Wayne DeAngelo (D)
2012–2013	Linda R. Greenstein (D)	Daniel R. Benson (D)	Wayne DeAngelo (D)
2014–2015	Linda R. Greenstein (D)	Daniel R. Benson (D)	Wayne DeAngelo (D)
2016–2017	Linda R. Greenstein (D)	Daniel R. Benson (D)	Wayne DeAngelo (D)
2018–2019	Linda R. Greenstein (D)	Daniel R. Benson (D)	Wayne DeAngelo (D)
2020–2021	Linda R. Greenstein (D)	Daniel R. Benson (D)	Wayne DeAngelo (D)
2022–2023	Linda R. Greenstein (D)	Daniel R. Benson (D) (Note: Resigned December 31, 2023 to become Mercer County Executive)	Wayne DeAngelo (D)
2022–2023	Linda R. Greenstein (D)	Tennille McCoy (D) (Note: Appointed to the Assembly on January 6, 2024, sworn in on January 8.)	Wayne DeAngelo (D)
2024–2025	Linda R. Greenstein (D)	Tennille McCoy (D)	Wayne DeAngelo (D)
2026–2027	Linda R. Greenstein (D)	Tennille McCoy (D)	Wayne DeAngelo (D)

== Election results, 1973–present ==
=== Senate ===
2021 New Jersey general election
Party	Candidate	Votes	%	±%
Democratic	Linda R. Greenstein	40,735	55.2	▼1.3
Republican	Adam J. Elias	33,116	44.8	▲1.3
Total votes		73,851	100.0	

New Jersey general election, 2017
Party	Candidate	Votes	%	±%
Democratic	Linda R. Greenstein	34,474	56.5	▲6.1
Republican	Ileana Schirmer	26,548	43.5	▼4.5
Total votes		61,022	100.0	

New Jersey general election, 2013
Party	Candidate	Votes	%	±%
Democratic	Linda R. Greenstein	31,387	50.4	▼4.9
Republican	Peter A. Inverso	29,903	48.0	▲3.3
Libertarian	Don DeZarn	1,014	1.6	N/A
Total votes		62,304	100.0	

2011 New Jersey general election
Party	Candidate	Votes	%
Democratic	Linda R. Greenstein	26,206	55.3
Republican	Richard J. Kanka	21,176	44.7
Total votes		47,382	100.0

Special election, November 2, 2010
Party	Candidate	Votes	%	±%
Democratic	Linda R. Greenstein	36,411	53.8	▲16.1
Republican	Thomas Goodwin	31,311	46.2	▼16.1
Total votes		67,722	100.0	

2007 New Jersey general election
Party	Candidate	Votes	%	±%
Republican	Bill Baroni	33,207	62.3	▲3.7
Democratic	Seema Singh	20,081	37.7	▼1.2
Total votes		53,288	100.0	

2003 New Jersey general election
Party	Candidate	Votes	%	±%
Republican	Peter Inverso	29,499	58.6	▲6.5
Democratic	Anthony J. "Skip" Cimino	19,613	38.9	▼9.0
Libertarian	Ray Cragle	1,249	2.5	N/A
Total votes		50,361	100.0	

2001 New Jersey general election
Party	Candidate	Votes	%
Republican	Peter A. Inverso	32,034	52.1
Democratic	Sam Plumeri, Jr.	29,458	47.9
Total votes		61,492	100.0

1997 New Jersey general election
Party	Candidate	Votes	%	±%
Republican	Peter A. Inverso	38,195	55.3	▼4.5
Democratic	Gilbert W. Lugossy	28,866	41.8	▲1.6
Conservative	Joseph Fabrizi	1,997	2.9	N/A
Total votes		69,058	100.0	

1993 New Jersey general election
Party	Candidate	Votes	%	±%
Republican	Peter A. Inverso	40,638	59.8	▲5.2
Democratic	Donald B. Dileo	27,361	40.2	▲3.4
Total votes		67,999	100.0	

1991 New Jersey general election
Party	Candidate	Votes	%
Republican	Peter Inverso	30,367	54.6
Democratic	Francis J. McManimon	20,496	36.8
Independent	Peter P. Garibaldi	4,791	8.6
Total votes		55,654	100.0

1987 New Jersey general election
Party	Candidate	Votes	%	±%
Democratic	Francis J. McManimon	30,873	64.2	▲0.7
Republican	Michael S. Richmond	17,222	35.8	▼0.7
Total votes		48,095	100.0	

1983 New Jersey general election
Party	Candidate	Votes	%	±%
Democratic	Francis J. McManimon	30,376	63.5	▲5.8
Republican	Charles B. W. Durand	17,448	36.5	▼5.8
Total votes		47,824	100.0	

1981 New Jersey general election
Party	Candidate	Votes	%
Democratic	Francis J. McManimon	31,742	57.7
Republican	Thomas Colitsas	23,296	42.3
Total votes		55,038	100.0

1977 New Jersey general election
Party	Candidate	Votes	%	±%
Republican	Walter E. Foran	33,556	56.8	▲8.3
Democratic	Peter J. Bearse	25,504	43.2	▼8.3
Total votes		59,060	100.0	

Special election, November 8, 1977
Party	Candidate	Votes	%	±%
Republican	Walter E. Foran	32,929	57.3	▲8.8
Democratic	Peter J. Bearse	24,496	42.7	▼8.8
Total votes		57,425	100.0	

1973 New Jersey general election
Party	Candidate	Votes	%
Democratic	Anne C. Martindell	29,512	51.5
Republican	William E. Schluter	27,755	48.5
Total votes		57,267	100.0

=== General Assembly ===
2021 New Jersey general election
Party	Candidate	Votes	%	±%
Democratic	Wayne P. DeAngelo	40,836	28.3	▼2.1
Democratic	Daniel R. Benson	40,241	27.8	▼1.8
Republican	Andrew Pachuta	31,366	21.7	▲1.8
Republican	Bina Shah	30,531	21.1	▲1.8
For The People	Michael Bollentin	1,535	1.1	▼0.4
Total votes		144,509	100.0	

2019 New Jersey general election
Party	Candidate	Votes	%	±%
Democratic	Wayne P. DeAngelo	30,546	30.4	▲0.4
Democratic	Daniel R. Benson	29,810	29.6	0.0
Republican	Thomas Calabrese	20,052	19.9	▼1.0
Republican	Bina Shah	18,452	18.3	▼1.2
Integrity and Accountability	Michael Bollentin	1,530	1.5	N/A
Total votes		100,590	100.0	

New Jersey general election, 2017
Party	Candidate	Votes	%	±%
Democratic	Wayne P. DeAngelo	35,596	30.0	▼0.2
Democratic	Daniel R. Benson	35,088	29.6	▲0.9
Republican	Kristian Stout	24,725	20.9	▲1.3
Republican	Steven Uccio	23,106	19.5	▲0.6
Total votes		118,515	100.0	

New Jersey general election, 2015
Party	Candidate	Votes	%	±%
Democratic	Wayne P. DeAngelo	22,319	30.2	▲3.2
Democratic	Daniel R. Benson	21,187	28.7	▲2.7
Republican	David C. Jones	14,474	19.6	▼4.0
Republican	Philip R. Kaufman	13,937	18.9	▼3.1
Green	Joann Cousin	1,028	1.4	N/A
Green	Steven Welzer	957	1.3	N/A
Total votes		73,902	100.0	

New Jersey general election, 2013
Party	Candidate	Votes	%	±%
Democratic	Wayne P. DeAngelo	32,048	27.0	▼2.0
Democratic	Daniel R. Benson	30,992	26.0	▼2.0
Republican	Steve Cook	28,135	23.6	▲2.7
Republican	Ronald Haas	26,233	22.0	▲1.2
Libertarian	Sean O’Connor	898	0.8	N/A
Libertarian	Steven Uccio	779	0.7	N/A
Total votes		119,085	100.0	

New Jersey general election, 2011
Party	Candidate	Votes	%
Democratic	Wayne P. DeAngelo	26,626	29.0
Democratic	Daniel R. Benson	25,662	28.0
Republican	Sheree McGowan	19,135	20.9
Republican	Wayne Wittman	19,100	20.8
Green	Steven Welzer	1,189	1.3
Total votes		91,712	100.0

New Jersey general election, 2009
Party	Candidate	Votes	%	±%
Democratic	Linda R. Greenstein	37,958	28.2	▲1.1
Democratic	Wayne P. DeAngelo	35,791	26.6	▲2.6
Republican	Rob Calabro	30,479	22.6	▼0.7
Republican	William T. Harvey, Jr.	29,530	21.9	▼0.8
Modern Whig	Gene L. Baldassari	859	0.6	N/A
Total votes		134,617	100.0	

New Jersey general election, 2007
Party	Candidate	Votes	%	±%
Democratic	Linda R. Greenstein	28,266	27.1	▲0.4
Democratic	Wayne P. DeAngelo	25,119	24.0	▲1.7
Republican	Thomas Goodwin	24,298	23.3	▼4.4
Republican	Adam Bushman	23,711	22.7	▲0.4
Libertarian	Jason M. Scheurer	1,775	1.7	▲1.2
Libertarian	Ray F. Cragle	1,308	1.3	▲0.8
Total votes		104,477	100.0	

New Jersey general election, 2005
Party	Candidate	Votes	%	±%
Republican	Bill Baroni	37,241	27.7	▼0.2
Democratic	Linda R. Greenstein	35,816	26.7	▲1.2
Democratic	Daniel R. Benson	29,914	22.3	▲0.2
Republican	Michael D. Paquette	29,899	22.3	▼2.2
Libertarian	William Hunsicker	725	0.5	N/A
Libertarian	Jason M. Scheurer	714	0.5	N/A
Total votes		134,309	100.0	

New Jersey general election, 2003
Party	Candidate	Votes	%	±%
Republican	Bill Baroni	27,181	27.9	▲4.7
Democratic	Linda R. Greenstein	24,752	25.5	▼2.0
Republican	Sidna B. Mitchell	23,872	24.5	▲1.5
Democratic	Gary L. Guear Sr	21,448	22.1	▼4.2
Total votes		97,253	100.0	

New Jersey general election, 2001
Party	Candidate	Votes	%
Democratic	Linda R. Greenstein	32,878	27.5
Democratic	Gary L. Guear Sr	31,469	26.3
Republican	Barbara Wright	27,803	23.2
Republican	Paul R. Kramer	27,563	23.0
Total votes		119,713	100.0

New Jersey general election, 1999
Party	Candidate	Votes	%	±%
Democratic	Linda R. Greenstein	25,219	25.4	▲2.3
Democratic	Gary L. Guear, Sr.	25,214	25.4	▲2.6
Republican	Paul R. Kramer	24,769	25.0	▼1.2
Republican	Barbara W. Wright	23,981	24.2	▼1.8
Total votes		99,183	100.0	

New Jersey general election, 1997
Party	Candidate	Votes	%	±%
Republican	Paul R. Kramer	34,996	26.2	▲1.0
Republican	Barbara W. Wright	34,725	26.0	▲1.8
Democratic	Janice S. Mironov	30,870	23.1	▲0.6
Democratic	Diana Segarra-Smith	30,534	22.8	▲1.5
Conservative	Bruce C. Macdonald	2,586	1.9	▼1.6
Total votes		133,711	100.0	

New Jersey general election, 1995
Party	Candidate	Votes	%	±%
Republican	Paul R. Kramer	23,861	25.2	▼2.5
Republican	Barbara W. Wright	22,919	24.2	▼4.1
Democratic	Tina D’Oria	21,260	22.5	▲0.2
Democratic	John Huntoon	20,161	21.3	▲0.6
Conservative	Bruce C. Mac Donald	3,349	3.5	N/A
Conservative	Walt Sully	3,119	3.3	N/A
Total votes		94,669	100.0	

New Jersey general election, 1993
Party	Candidate	Votes	%	±%
Republican	Barbara W. Wright	37,626	28.3	▲1.3
Republican	Paul R. Kramer	36,767	27.7	▼1.4
Democratic	Janice S. Mironov	29,573	22.3	▲2.7
Democratic	Nina Kelty	27,570	20.7	▲4.1
Libertarian	Benjamin Grindlinger	570	0.4	N/A
Repeal State Mandates	Harold E. Swartz	387	0.3	N/A
Populist	Michael S. Schoellkopf	385	0.3	N/A
Total votes		132,878	100.0	

1991 New Jersey general election
Party	Candidate	Votes	%
Republican	Paul Kramer	31,944	29.1
Republican	Barbara Wright	29,655	27.0
Democratic	Anthony J. “Skip” Cimino	21,537	19.6
Democratic	Peter A. Cantu	18,168	16.6
Regular Independent Organization	Kevin John Meara	5,145	4.7
Senior Power	Paul Rizzo	3,231	2.9
Total votes		109,680	100.0

1989 New Jersey general election
Party	Candidate	Votes	%	±%
Democratic	Anthony J. “Skip” Cimino	40,784	32.7	▲2.3
Democratic	Joseph D. Patero	39,299	31.5	▲1.4
Republican	Frank V. Ragazzo	23,620	18.9	▼1.1
Republican	Calvin O. Iszard, Jr.	21,118	16.9	▼2.6
Total votes		124,821	100.0	

1987 New Jersey general election
Party	Candidate	Votes	%	±%
Democratic	Anthony J. “Skip” Cimino	28,658	30.4	▲3.9
Democratic	Joseph D. Patero	28,371	30.1	▲5.2
Republican	David J. Kenny	18,820	20.0	▼6.1
Republican	Walt Sodie	18,338	19.5	▼3.0
Total votes		94,187	100.0	

1985 New Jersey general election
Party	Candidate	Votes	%	±%
Democratic	Joseph L. Bocchini, Jr.	28,476	26.5	▼2.0
Republican	John K. Rafferty	27,960	26.1	▲3.8
Democratic	Joseph D. Patero	26,707	24.9	▼3.2
Republican	Thomas Colitsas	24,189	22.5	▲1.4
Total votes		107,332	100.0	

New Jersey general election, 1983
Party	Candidate	Votes	%	±%
Democratic	Joseph L. Bocchini, Jr.	26,856	28.5	▲3.0
Democratic	Joseph D. Patero	26,401	28.1	▲2.3
Republican	Donald J. Tamutus	21,020	22.3	▼2.6
Republican	Thomas Colitsas	19,828	21.1	▼2.7
Total votes		94,105	100.0	

New Jersey general election, 1981
Party	Candidate	Votes	%
Democratic	Joseph D. Patero	27,946	25.8
Democratic	Joseph L. Bocchini, Jr.	27,610	25.5
Republican	Paul R. Kramer	26,950	24.9
Republican	Gregory Switlik	25,742	23.8
Total votes		108,248	100.0

New Jersey general election, 1979
Party	Candidate	Votes	%	±%
Democratic	Barbara W. McConnell	27,104	27.7	▲1.8
Republican	Karl Weidel	26,472	27.0	▲0.1
Republican	Richard A. Zimmer	25,443	26.0	▲1.3
Democratic	Stanley J. Oleniacz	18,932	19.3	▼3.3
Total votes		97,951	100.0	

New Jersey general election, 1977
Party	Candidate	Votes	%	±%
Republican	Karl Weidel	32,181	26.9	▼2.0
Democratic	Barbara W. McConnell	30,996	25.9	▲4.4
Republican	Regina H. Meredith	29,533	24.7	▼4.8
Democratic	Thomas DeMartin	27,068	22.6	▲2.5
Total votes		119,778	100.0	

New Jersey general election, 1975
Party	Candidate	Votes	%	±%
Republican	Walter E. Foran	31,662	29.5	▲3.8
Republican	Karl Weidel	31,043	28.9	▲3.3
Democratic	Lucy F. Mackenzie	23,021	21.5	▼3.4
Democratic	Michael S. Arcieri	21,516	20.1	▼3.7
Total votes		107,242	100.0	

New Jersey general election, 1973
Party	Candidate	Votes	%
Republican	Walter E. Foran	28,517	25.7
Republican	Karl Weidel	28,403	25.6
Democratic	Michael G. Morris	27,578	24.9
Democratic	Ted M. Yim	26,344	23.8
Total votes		110,842	100.0

== Election results, 1965–1973 ==
=== Senate ===
1965 New Jersey general election
Party	Candidate	Votes	%
Democratic	Anthony J. Grossi	75,497	28.8
Democratic	Joseph M. Keegan	73,698	28.1
Republican	Arthur J. Sullivan	57,326	21.9
Republican	John F. Evers	55,042	21.0
Socialist Labor	Harry Santhouse	442	0.2
Total votes		262,005	100.0

1967 New Jersey general election
Party	Candidate	Votes	%
Republican	Ira Schoem	63,858	18.5
Republican	Frank J. Sciro	62,891	18.2
Republican	Edward Sisco	62,720	18.2
Democratic	Joseph A. Lazzara	55,552	16.1
Democratic	Joseph M. Keegan	50,375	14.6
Democratic	Charles J. Alfano	48,967	14.2
Socialist Labor	Harry Santhouse	771	0.2
Total votes		345,134	100.0

1971 New Jersey general election
Party	Candidate	Votes	%
Democratic	Joseph Hirkala	64,725	21.2
Democratic	Joseph A. Lazzara	54,426	17.8
Democratic	William J. Bate	54,149	17.7
Republican	Alfred E. Fontanella	46,478	15.2
Republican	Thomas W. E. Bowdler	39,545	12.9
Republican	Henry Fette	39,406	12.9
Socialist Labor	Robert Clement	3,645	1.2
Socialist Labor	Josephine Clement	3,485	1.1
Total votes		305,859	100.0

=== General Assembly ===
==== District 14 at-large ====
New Jersey general election, 1967
Party	Candidate	Votes	%
Republican	Joseph F. Scancarella	60,663	26.8
Republican	Alfred E. Fontanella	60,420	26.7
Democratic	Joseph Grecco	48,662	21.5
Democratic	Betty McNamara Kordja	46,947	20.8
Independent Taxpayer Candidate	Ruth M. Fetterman	7,187	3.2
Conservative	Dominick M. Angotti	2,158	1.0
Total votes		226,037	100.0

New Jersey general election, 1969
Party	Candidate	Votes	%
Republican	John F. Evers	66,620	52.1
Democratic	Harry J. Butler	58,559	45.8
Independent Party	Lester I. Forsythe, Jr.	2,650	2.1
Total votes		127,829	100.0

New Jersey general election, 1971
Party	Candidate	Votes	%
Democratic	Vincent Ozzie Pellecchia	52,406	27.4
Democratic	John J. Sinsimer	52,106	27.2
Republican	Joseph Bender	44,346	23.2
Republican	August W. Fischer	42,412	22.2
Total votes		191,270	100.0

==== District 14A ====
New Jersey general election, 1967
Party	Candidate	Votes	%
Democratic	Joseph Hirkala	18,730	50.9
Republican	Mervyn R. Montgomery	18,044	49.1
Total votes		36,774	100.0

New Jersey general election, 1969
Party	Candidate	Votes	%
Republican	Alfred E. Fontanella	30,222	28.0
Republican	James R. White	28,645	26.5
Democratic	Christopher Frawley	23,232	21.5
Democratic	Augustus T. Capers	22,708	21.0
Independent	John R. Patterson	3,138	2.9
Total votes		107,945	100.0

New Jersey general election, 1971
Party	Candidate	Votes	%
Democratic	Herbert C. Klein	18,563	52.7
Republican	Joseph F. Scancarella	16,675	47.3
Total votes		35,238	100.0

==== District 14B ====
New Jersey general election, 1967
Party	Candidate	Votes	%
Democratic	Augustus T. Capers	14,856	54.2
Republican	Frank Melton	10,410	38.0
Peoples Independent	William M. Kline	2,132	7.8
Total votes		27,398	100.0

New Jersey general election, 1969
Party	Candidate	Votes	%
Democratic	Joseph Hirkala	41,671	26.9
Republican	Joseph F. Scancarella	41,301	26.7
Republican	Joseph J. Bender	35,375	22.9
Democratic	Robert J. Jablonski	34,806	22.5
Independent Party	James P. Raftery	1,490	1.0
Total votes		154,643	100.0

New Jersey general election, 1971
Party	Candidate	Votes	%
Democratic	William Hicks	13,983	64.1
Republican	John J. McKniff	7,846	35.9
Total votes		21,829	100.0

==== District 14C ====
New Jersey general election, 1967
Party	Candidate	Votes	%
Republican	John F. Evers	31,946	65.0
Democratic	Richard P. Marcus	17,184	35.0
Total votes		49,130	100.0

New Jersey general election, 1971
Party	Candidate	Votes	%
Republican	John F. Evers	25,157	58.9
Democratic	John M. Running	17,531	41.1
Total votes		42,688	100.0

Special election, November 7, 1972
Party	Candidate	Votes	%
Republican	Michael M. Horn	38,726	60.9
Democratic	Walter F. Hoffmann	24,896	39.1
Total votes		63,622	100.0
