= Trenton Catholic High School =

Defunct school in Trenton, New Jersey, US

Coordinates: 40.2156°N 74.7217°W

Trenton Catholic High School was a Roman Catholic high school serving boys in ninth through twelfth grades located in the Chambersburg section of Trenton, in Mercer County, in the U.S. state of New Jersey.

The school closed after the 1961-1962 school year, at which time St. Anthony High School was created to fill the void. After being renamed as McCorristin Catholic High School, the school was then known as Trenton Catholic Academy until its rebrand in 2021 to Trenton Catholic Preparatory Academy. Then converted to charter in 2024, now known as Thrive Charter School.

== Athletics ==
The spring / outdoor track team won the Non-Public A state title in 1934, 1946, 1948 and 1951

The basketball team won the Non-Public Group A state championship in 1938 (defeating Good Counsel High School of Newark in the championship game). 1946 (vs. Seton Hall Preparatory School), 1947 (vs. Seton Hall Prep), 1948 (vs. St. Michael's High School), 1950 (vs. St. Peter's Preparatory School of Jersey City), 1957 (vs. St. Peter's of Jersey City), 1958 (vs. Seton Hall Prep) and 1960 (vs. St. Peter's of Jersey City). The eight championship titles remains tied for seventh-most in the state, despite the school having been closed for more than 50 years The 1947 team won the Parochial A state title with a 55-47 win against a Seton Hall team that had beaten then twice during the regular season

The soccer team was awarded the Non-Public A state title by the New Jersey State Interscholastic Athletic Association in 1949, 1950, 1958 and 1959

== Notable alumni ==
- Carmen J. Armenti (1929–2001), restaurateur and politician who served as the mayor of Trenton, New Jersey from 1966 to 1970 and again from 1989 to 1990
- Kathleen Byerly (1944–2020), captain in the United States Navy
- Francis J. McManimon (1926–2020), politician who served in the New Jersey General Assembly from 1972 to 1982 and in the New Jersey Senate from 1982 to 1992
- Joe J. Plumeri (born 1944, class of 1961), Chairman & CEO of Willis Group Holdings, and owner of the Trenton Thunder
- John K. Rafferty (1938–2021), politician who served as Mayor of Hamilton Township, New Jersey from 1976 to 1999 and in the New Jersey General Assembly from the 14th Legislative District from 1986 to 1988
- Karl Weidel (1923–1997), politician who served in the New Jersey General Assembly
- Nick Werkman (born c. 1941, class of 1959), basketball player for the Seton Hall Pirates, who led the NCAA in scoring in 1962-63 and was in the top three nationally on his two other collegiate seasons
