= Bo Sullivan =

American politician (1937–2000)

Joseph Aloysius "Bo" Sullivan (February 10, 1937 – March 13, 2000) was chairman of the New Jersey Turnpike Authority and a Republican Party politician who sought the nomination for Governor of New Jersey in the 1981 primary.

== Early life ==
Sullivan was born on February 10, 1937. He played football at Newark Academy and was a 1959 graduate of Princeton University, where he played football and graduated cum laude. He received his law degree in 1964 . After graduating from Princeton, Sullivan worked full-time at his father's firm, Bomont Industries. During his time at the firm he attended law school at night, earning a degree from Seton Hall University School of Law in 1964.

Sullivan was the president and CEO of Bomont Industries, once among the largest manufacturers of typewriter ribbons in the United States. Bomont was founded by Sullivan's father in Totowa, New Jersey; the younger Sullivan took over the firm soon after finishing law school and transitioned the company into a manufacturer of industrial fabrics.

== Political career ==
Sullivan served as Finance Chairman of the Essex County Republican Committee and was a top fundraiser for Ronald Reagan in 1980.

=== Campaign for governor ===
In 1980, Sullivan began to plan a campaign for governor of New Jersey. In order to increase his national exposure, Sullivan threw a large party at the 1980 Republican National Convention. A newcomer at the time, he joked that he once had been elected, but it was to be captain of the football team at Newark Academy. Campaigning in 1981, Sullivan eschewed public financing and spent more than $2 million of his own money to win the Republican nomination for governor, but was unsuccessful. He finished third in an eight-candidate field, behind former Assembly Speaker Thomas Kean and former Paterson Mayor Pat Kramer. His campaign was managed by Karl Ottesen, who had run the stealth U.S. Senate race of Al D'Amato in New York the previous year. In trying to portray Kean as out of touch with common folk, Sullivan ran a TV ad that said "This isn't the kind of guy who would buy you a beer in Bayonne." Toward the end of the campaign, he received support from key Right to Life groups.

The election results were:

Candidate	Office	Votes	%
Thomas Kean	Former Assembly Speaker	122,512	31%
Pat Kramer	Former mayor of Paterson	83,565	21%
Bo Sullivan	Businessman	67,651	17%
James Wallwork	State Senator	61,816	16%
Barry T. Parker	State Senator	26,040	7%
Anthony Imperiale	State Assemblyman	18,452	5%
Jack Rafferty	Mayor of Hamilton	12,837	3%
Richard McGlynn	Former Superior Court Judge	5,486	1%

Sullivan won kudos from GOP leaders when he showed up at Kean's victory celebration to offer his support. Later, he joined Kean for a beer at a Bayonne bar. After Kean won, he named Sullivan as chairman of the New Jersey Turnpike Authority.

=== Later roles ===
He served as New Jersey Co-Chairman of George H. W. Bush's 1988 presidential campaign, and was a part of the Bush transition team recruiting candidates from New Jersey, New York, Pennsylvania, Maryland, and Delaware for federal posts. He was often mentioned as possible United States Ambassador to Ireland under Bush. He was viewed as a likely candidate for governor in 1989, but declined to run.

== Death ==
A resident of Essex Fells, New Jersey, and later of the New Vernon section of Harding Township, New Jersey, Sullivan died at a hospital in Morristown, New Jersey at age 63, following a stroke.
