= 1993 New Jersey Senate election =

1993 New Jersey Senate elections
- November 2, 1993

All 40 seats in the New Jersey State Senate 21 seats needed for a majority
- Turnout: 65% (▲14pp)

	Majority party	Minority party
Leader	Donald DiFrancesco	John A. Lynch Jr.
Party	Republican	Democratic
Leader since	January 14, 1992	January 9, 1990
Leader's seat	22nd (Warren Township)	17th (New Brunsick)
Last election	27	13
Seats won	24	16
Seat change	▼3	▲3
- Results by district Democratic hold Democratic gain Republican hold
Senate President before election
Donald DiFrancesco
Republican
Elected Senate President
Donald DiFrancesco
Republican

The 1993 New Jersey Senate election was held on November 2.

The election took place alongside Christine Todd Whitman's election as Governor over incumbent Jim Florio. Republicans defended the large majority they gained in the 1991 landslide elections, though Democrats did win back districts 7 and 19 that they lost in that election, and picked up the 25th district in an upset over incumbent John H. Dorsey.

This election featured in the political rises of future Governors Jim McGreevey, who flipped one of the three Democratic gains by defeating Randy Corman, and Chris Christie, who unsuccessfully challenged Senator Dorsey in the Republican primary, possibly undermining Dorsey's re-election campaign.

Contents
Incumbents not running • Summary of results
By District: 1 • 2 • 3 • 4 • 5 • 6 • 7 • 8 • 9 • 10 • 11 • 12 • 13 • 14 • 15 • 16 • 17 • 18 • 19 • 20 • 21 • 22 • 23 • 24 • 25 • 26 • 27 • 28 • 29 • 30 • 31 • 32 • 33 • 34 • 35 • 36 • 37 • 38 • 39 • 40

== Incumbents not running for re-election ==
=== Democratic ===
- Matthew Feldman (District 37)

=== Republican ===
- John E. Dimon (District 30)

== Summary of results by State Senate district ==
District	Incumbent	Party	Elected Senator	Party
1st Legislative District	James Cafiero	Rep	James Cafiero	Rep
2nd Legislative District	William Gormley	Rep	William Gormley	Rep
3rd Legislative District	Raymond Zane	Dem	Raymond Zane	Dem
4th Legislative District	John Matheussen	Rep	John Matheussen	Rep
5th Legislative District	Walter Rand	Dem	Walter Rand	Dem
6th Legislative District	John Adler	Dem	John Adler	Dem
7th Legislative District	Bradford S. Smith	Rep	Jack Casey	Dem
8th Legislative District	C. William Haines	Rep	C. William Haines	Rep
9th Legislative District	Leonard T. Connors	Rep	Leonard T. Connors	Rep
10th Legislative District	Andrew R. Ciesla	Rep	Andrew R. Ciesla	Rep
11th Legislative District	Joseph A. Palaia	Rep	Joseph A. Palaia	Rep
12th Legislative District	John O. Bennett	Rep	John O. Bennett	Rep
13th Legislative District	Joe Kyrillos	Rep	Joe Kyrillos	Rep
14th Legislative District	Peter Inverso	Rep	Peter Inverso	Rep
15th Legislative District	Dick LaRossa	Rep	Dick LaRossa	Rep
16th Legislative District	John H. Ewing	Rep	John H. Ewing	Rep
17th Legislative District	John A. Lynch Jr.	Dem	John A. Lynch Jr.	Dem
18th Legislative District	Jack Sinagra	Rep	Jack Sinagra	Rep
19th Legislative District	Randy Corman	Rep	Jim McGreevey	Dem
20th Legislative District	Raymond Lesniak	Dem	Raymond Lesniak	Dem
21st Legislative District	C. Louis Bassano	Rep	C. Louis Bassano	Rep
22nd Legislative District	Donald DiFrancesco	Rep	Donald DiFrancesco	Rep
23rd Legislative District	William E. Schluter	Rep	William E. Schluter	Rep
24th Legislative District	Robert Littell	Rep	Robert Littell	Rep
25th Legislative District	John H. Dorsey	Rep	Gordon MacInnes	Dem
26th Legislative District	Robert Martin (Note: Martin was appointed to complete the unexpired term of Senator Leanna Brown, who was appointed to the New Jersey Casino Control Commission.)	Rep	Robert Martin	Rep
27th Legislative District	Richard Codey	Dem	Richard Codey	Dem
28th Legislative District	Ronald Rice	Dem	Ronald Rice	Dem
29th Legislative District	Wynona Lipman	Dem	Wynona Lipman	Dem
30th Legislative District	John E. Dimon	Rep	Robert W. Singer	Rep
31st Legislative District	Edward T. O'Connor Jr.	Dem	Edward T. O'Connor Jr.	Dem
32nd Legislative District	Thomas F. Cowan	Dem	Nicholas Sacco	Dem
33rd Legislative District	Bernard Kenny (Note: Kenny was appointed to complete the unexpired term of Senator Bob Menendez, who resigned to take his seat in the U.S. House of Representatives.)	Dem	Bernard Kenny	Dem
34th Legislative District	Joseph Bubba	Rep	Joseph Bubba	Rep
35th Legislative District	John Girgenti	Dem	John Girgenti	Dem
36th Legislative District	John P. Scott	Rep	John P. Scott	Rep
37th Legislative District	Matthew Feldman	Dem	Byron Baer	Dem
38th Legislative District	Louis F. Kosco	Rep	Louis F. Kosco	Rep
39th Legislative District	Gerald Cardinale	Rep	Gerald Cardinale	Rep
40th Legislative District	Henry McNamara	Rep	Henry McNamara	Rep

=== Close races ===
Seats where the margin of victory was under 10%:

1. Legislative District 4, 8.6%
2. Legislative District 7, 2.2% gain
3. Legislative District 15, 4.6%
4. Legislative District 19, 2.5% gain
5. Legislative District 25, 0.6% gain
6. Legislative District 34, 4.6%
7. Legislative District 36, 5.8%

== District 1 ==
New Jersey general election, 1993
Party	Candidate	Votes	%	±%
Republican	James Cafiero (incumbent)	36,420	62.0%	Steady
Democratic	John Spahn	21,446	36.5%	▼1.5
Libertarian	Joseph T. Ponczek	957	1.6%	N/A
Total votes		58,823	100.00%	

== District 2 ==
New Jersey general election, 1993
Party	Candidate	Votes	%	±%
Republican	William Gormley (incumbent)	32,059	61.6%	▲8.3
Democratic	Mark Roody	19,973	38.4%	▼8.3
Total votes		52,032	100.00%	

== District 3 ==
New Jersey general election, 1993
Party	Candidate	Votes	%	±%
Democratic	Raymond Zane (incumbent)	40,940	67.6%	▲6.7
Republican	Edward J. Reynolds	19,622	32.4%	▲0.4
Total votes		60,562	100.00%	

== District 4 ==
New Jersey general election, 1993
Party	Candidate	Votes	%	±%
Republican	John J. Matheussen (incumbent)	29,483	54.3%	▲2.6
Democratic	Bernard "Ben" Lynch	24,799	45.7%	▼2.6
Total votes		54,282	100.00%	

== District 5 ==
New Jersey general election, 1993
Party	Candidate	Votes	%	±%
Democratic	Walter Rand (incumbent)	29,152	69.2%	▲2.1
Republican	Anthony J. De Gerolamo	12,959	30.8%	▼2.1
Total votes		42,111	100.00%	

== District 6 ==
New Jersey general election, 1993
Party	Candidate	Votes	%	±%
Democratic	John Adler (incumbent)	38,235	59.8%	▲4.4
Republican	Louise Di Renzo Donaldson	25,752	40.2%	▼4.4
Total votes		63,987	100.00%	

== District 7 ==
New Jersey general election, 1993
Party	Candidate	Votes	%	±%
Democratic	Jack Casey	27,995	50.4%	▲4.0
Republican	Bradford S. Smith (incumbent)	26,795	48.2%	▼5.4
United Independents	James C. Lewis	789	1.4%	N/A
Total votes		55,579	100.00%	

== District 8 ==
New Jersey general election, 1993
Party	Candidate	Votes	%	±%
Republican	C. William Haines (incumbent)	36,767	61.0%	▼5.3
Democratic	Mary P. McKeon Stosuy	23,480	39.0%	▲5.3
Total votes		60,247	100.0	

== District 9 ==
New Jersey general election, 1993
Party	Candidate	Votes	%	±%
Republican	Leonard T. Connors (incumbent)	50,464	65.2%	▼4.7
Democratic	Joseph Meglino	26,947	34.8%	▲4.7
Total votes		77,411	100.00%	

== District 10 ==
New Jersey general election, 1993
Party	Candidate	Votes	%	±%
Republican	Andrew R. Ciesla (incumbent)	43,246	61.7%	▲0.1
Democratic	Anthony Carracino	25,122	35.8%	▼2.6
Conservative	Louis B. Wary, Jr.	1,766	2.5%	N/A
Total votes		70,134	100.00%	

== District 11 ==
New Jersey general election, 1993
Party	Candidate	Votes	%	±%
Republican	Joseph A. Palaia (incumbent)	40,612	65.6%	▲0.4
Democratic	Richard C. Schwartz	19,163	30.9%	▲0.8
Conservative	Tom Appleby	1,313	2.1%	▼1.1
Libertarian	Barbara A. Jones	858	1.4%	N/A
Total votes		61,946	100.00%	

== District 12 ==
New Jersey general election, 1993
Party	Candidate	Votes	%	±%
Republican	John O. Bennett (incumbent)	43,490	65.0%	▼2.2
Democratic	George E. Ball	20,926	31.3%	▲3.5
Conservative	Rich Pezzullo	1,609	2.4%	N/A
Libertarian	Virginia A. Flynn	881	1.3%	▼0.4
Total votes		66,906	100.00%	

== District 13 ==
New Jersey general election, 1993
Party	Candidate	Votes	%	±%
Republican	Joe Kyrillos (incumbent)	40,140	64.0%	▼3.8
Democratic	Patrick D. Healy	22,603	36.0%	▲3.8
Total votes		62,743	100.00%	

== District 14 ==
New Jersey general election, 1993
Party	Candidate	Votes	%	±%
Republican	Peter Inverso (incumbent)	40,638	59.8%	▲5.2
Democratic	Donald B. Dileo	27,361	40.2%	▲3.4
Total votes		67,999	100.00%	

== District 15 ==
New Jersey general election, 1993
Party	Candidate	Votes	%	±%
Republican	Dick LaRossa (incumbent)	28,311	52.3%	▲1.4
Democratic	Gerald R. Stockman	25,814	47.7%	▼1.4
Total votes		54,125	100.00%	

== District 16 ==
New Jersey general election, 1993
Party	Candidate	Votes	%	±%
Republican	John H. Ewing (incumbent)	43,060	61.6%	▼6.8
Democratic	Marybeth Kohut	26,841	38.4%	▲6.8
Total votes		69,901	100.00%	

== District 17 ==
New Jersey general election, 1993
Party	Candidate	Votes	%	±%
Democratic	John A. Lynch Jr. (incumbent)	24,806	56.7%	▲4.7
Republican	Edward R. Tiller	14,981	34.2%	▼13.8
Independent	Valorie Caffee	3,989	9.1%	N/A
Total votes		43,776	100.00%	

== District 18 ==
New Jersey general election, 1993
Party	Candidate	Votes	%	±%
Republican	Jack Sinagra (incumbent)	36,736	58.2%	▲4.7
Democratic	Samuel V. Convery, Jr.	25,106	39.8%	▼6.7
Voter's Independence Coalition	Kevin Michael Criss	1,261	2.0%	N/A
Total votes		63,103	100.00%	

== District 19 ==
New Jersey general election, 1993
Party	Candidate	Votes	%	±%
Democratic	James E. McGreevey	26,721	47.6%	▲3.2
Republican	Randy Corman (incumbent)	25,278	45.1%	▼10.5
"People's Choice"	Leonard R. Sendelsky	4,092	7.3%	N/A
Total votes		56,091	100.00%	

== District 20 ==
New Jersey general election, 1993
Party	Candidate	Votes	%	±%
Democratic	Raymond Lesniak (incumbent)	23,845	59.9	▲2.8
Republican	William P. Wnuck	15,945	40.1	▼2.8
Total votes		39,790	100.00%	

== District 21 ==
New Jersey general election, 1993
Party	Candidate	Votes	%	±%
Republican	C. Louis Bassano (incumbent)	45,589	64.3%	▼7.3
Democratic	Cathie Perselay Seidman	24,267	34.2%	▲5.8
Public Servant/Leader	Linda S. Dye	1,036	1.5%	N/A
Total votes		70,892	100.0	

== District 22 ==
New Jersey general election, 1993
Party	Candidate	Votes	%	±%
Republican	Donald DiFrancesco (incumbent)	50,539	69.2%	▼9.0
Democratic	Eli Hoffman	22,461	30.8%	N/A
Total votes		73,000	100.0	

== District 23 ==
New Jersey general election, 1993
Party	Candidate	Votes	%	±%
Republican	William E. Schluter (incumbent)	51,856	91.7%	▲19.3
Libertarian	Roger Bacon	4,675	8.3%	N/A
Total votes		56,531	100.0	

== District 24 ==
New Jersey general election, 1993
Party	Candidate	Votes	%	±%
Republican	Robert Littell (incumbent)	47,382	83.3%	▲8.5
Libertarian	William J. Dundas	9,502	16.7%	N/A
Total votes		56,884	100.0	

== District 25 ==
=== Republican primary ===
Dorsey initially faced a primary challenge from Chris Christie, but Christie was disqualified when Dorsey challenged his nominating petition signatures as invalid, leaving Dorsey unopposed in the Republican primary.

=== Democratic primary ===
Lou Calesso was nominated in the initial Democratic primary, but withdrew thereafter in favor of former Senator Gordon MacInnes.

=== General election ===
New Jersey general election, 1993
Party	Candidate	Votes	%	±%
Democratic	Gordon MacInnes	34,646	50.3%	▲22.0
Republican	John H. Dorsey (incumbent)	34,291	49.7%	▼22.0
Total votes		68,937	100.00%	

== District 26 ==
New Jersey general election, 1993
Party	Candidate	Votes	%	±%
Republican	Robert Martin (incumbent)	45,217	69.4%	▼8.8
Democratic	E. Drew Britcher	19,935	30.6%	▲8.8
Total votes		65,152	100.0	

== District 27 ==
New Jersey general election, 1993
Party	Candidate	Votes	%	±%
Democratic	Richard Codey (incumbent)	33,138	75.1%	▲7.0
Republican	Dr. Zal Velez	10,979	24.9%	▼7.0
Total votes		44,117	100.0	

== District 28 ==
New Jersey general election, 1993
Party	Candidate	Votes	%	±%
Democratic	Ronald Rice (incumbent)	25,107	100.00%	▲32.8
Total votes		25,107	100.0	

== District 29 ==
New Jersey general election, 1993
Party	Candidate	Votes	%	±%
Democratic	Wynona Lipman (incumbent)	20,734	100.00%	Steady
Total votes		20,734	100.0	

== District 30 ==
New Jersey general election, 1993
Party	Candidate	Votes	%	±%
Republican	Robert W. Singer	32,678	65.7%	▲0.7
Democratic	Lyle M. (Peggi) Sturmfels	17,047	34.3%	▼0.7
Total votes		49,725	100.0	

== District 31 ==
New Jersey general election, 1993
Party	Candidate	Votes	%	±%
Democratic	Edward T. O'Connor Jr. (incumbent)	28,358	68.4	▲13.3
Republican	Peter J. Varsalona	13,128	31.6	▼13.3
Total votes		41,486	100.0	

== District 32 ==
New Jersey general election, 1993
Party	Candidate	Votes	%	±%
Democratic	Nicholas Sacco	28,280	59.3%	▲2.2
Republican	James E. Humphreys	17,509	36.7%	▼2.7
Politicians Are Crooks	Herbert H. Shaw	1,350	2.8%	▼0.6
Conservative	Patricia M. Armstrong	560	1.2%	N/A
Total votes		47,699	100.0	

== District 33 ==
New Jersey general election, 1993
Party	Candidate	Votes	%	±%
Democratic	Bernard Kenny (incumbent)	25,510	63.3	▼5.6
Republican	Fernando A. Alonso	14,325	35.6	▲4.5
Impact 93	Carlos Chirino	445	1.1	N/A
Total votes		40,280	100.0	

== District 34 ==
New Jersey general election, 1993
Party	Candidate	Votes	%	±%
Republican	Joseph Bubba (incumbent)	32,681	52.3%	▼0.2
Democratic	Patricia A. Royer	29,845	47.7%	▲12.7
Total votes		62,526	100.0	

== District 35 ==
New Jersey general election, 1993
Party	Candidate	Votes	%	±%
Democratic	John Girgenti (incumbent)	21,836	66.5%	▲13.3
Republican	Beltran Lopez	10,550	32.1%	▼14.7
Independent	Vijay “Viji” Sargis	442	1.3%	N/A
Total votes		32,828	100.0	

== District 36 ==
New Jersey general election, 1993
Party	Candidate	Votes	%	±%
Republican	John P. Scott (incumbent)	28,020	52.9%	▲0.9
Democratic	Gabe Ambrosio	24,945	47.1%	▼0.9
Total votes		52,965	100.0	

== District 37 ==
New Jersey general election, 1993
Party	Candidate	Votes	%	±%
Democratic	Byron Baer	35,941	60.5%	▲6.9
Republican	Mauro A. Mecca, M.D.	22,368	37.6%	▼8.8
Conservative	Joe Marino	1,107	1.9%	N/A
Total votes		59,416	100.00%	

== District 38 ==
New Jersey general election, 1993
Party	Candidate	Votes	%	±%
Republican	Louis F. Kosco (incumbent)	40,276	63.3%	▲7.9
Democratic	James Krone	23,348	36.7%	▼4.4
Total votes		63,624	100.00%	

== District 39 ==
New Jersey general election, 1993
Party	Candidate	Votes	%	±%
Republican	Gerald Cardinale (incumbent)	48,803	62.5%	▼4.4
Democratic	Stephen H. Jaffe	29,268	37.5%	▲4.4
Total votes		78,071	100.00%	

== District 40 ==
New Jersey general election, 1993
Party	Candidate	Votes	%	±%
Republican	Henry McNamara (incumbent)	49,041	67.7%	▼7.8
Democratic	Bea O’ Rourke	23,380	32.3%	▲7.8
Total votes		72,421	100.00%	

== See also ==
- 1993 New Jersey General Assembly election
