= Francis J. McManimon =

American politician (1926–2020)

Member of the New Jersey Senate from the 14th district
- In office January 12, 1982 – January 14, 1992
- Preceded by: Walter E. Foran
- Succeeded by: Peter Inverso

Member of the New Jersey General Assembly
- In office January 11, 1972 – January 12, 1982 Serving with S. Howard Woodson (1972–76), Helen Chiarello Szabo (1976–78), and Gerald R. Stockman (1978–82)
- Preceded by: Joseph P. Merlino
- Succeeded by: (redistricted to 14th); Joseph Patero; Joseph L. Bocchini Jr.
- Constituency: District 6B (1972–1974); 13th district (1974–1982)

Personal details
- Born: September 30, 1926 Trenton, New Jersey, U.S.
- Died: March 25, 2020 (aged 93) Surf City, New Jersey, U.S.
- Party: Democratic
- Education: Trenton Catholic High School
- Alma mater: Niagara University

Francis J. "Franny" McManimon (September 30, 1926 – March 25, 2020) was an American politician who served in the New Jersey General Assembly from 1972 to 1982 and in the New Jersey Senate from 1982 to 1992.

== Early life ==
McManimon was born in Trenton, New Jersey on September 30, 1926, and graduated from Trenton Catholic High School. He served in the United States Navy aboard the USS Dayton during World War II. He received his bachelor's degree in economics from Niagara University in 1954 and studied recreation at the graduate level at New York University.

== Political career ==
McManimon was superintendent for the Hamilton Township Department of Parks and Recreation from 1959 to 1989. He also served as chairman of the New Jersey Parks and Recreation Legislative Committee, and as a member of the Hamilton Board of Health.

=== New Jersey Assembly ===
He made his first bid for elected office in 1967, running in the newly drawn two-member Mercer County Assembly district, but he and his running mate Lloyd Carver were defeated by the Republican candidates, Pennington councilman William Schluter and West Windsor mayor John Selecky.

In 1971, the New Jersey legislative districts were redrawn again to create a district consisting of only Hamilton, Trenton, and Washington Township (now Robbinsville). Senator Sido Ridolfi retired and Assemblyman Joseph Merlino ran to succeed him, leaving an Assembly seat open. McManimon won the open seat as the top vote-getter, 4,629 votes ahead of his running mate, Assemblyman S. Howard Woodson.

In 1973, McManimon was easily re-elected as part of the Democratic landslide. He was again the top vote-getter, and Woodson was elected Speaker of the Assembly.

In 1975, McManimon and Woodson were challenged in the Democratic primary by former Hamilton mayor Albert DeMartin. DeMartin made an issue of Woodson’s interest in leaving the legislature to join Gov. Brendan Byrne’s cabinet as president of the New Jersey Civil Service Commission. McManimon received 17,546 votes, while Woodson defeated DeMartin by 2,185 votes, 14,021 to 11,836. McManimon was easily re-elected in 1975, 1977, and 1979.

=== New Jersey Senate ===
In 1981, Hamilton and Trenton were separated in legislative redistricting based on the results of the 1980 United States census, creating an open district stretching north from Hamilton to Franklin Township, Somerset County, New Jersey. McManimon easily defeated Republican Thomas Colitsas for the open seat. In 1983, he was re-elected in a landslide over former Franklin mayor Charles B.W. Durand. He was again re-elected easily in 1987.

As Senator, McManimon served as Senate Assistant Majority Leader and took a special interest in legislation dealing with transportation, the protection of open space, veterans’ affairs and senior citizens. He opposed limitations on smoking in public places. He sponsored legislation that incentivized state workers to retire early, a popular bill in the most state employee-heavy legislative district in the state.

In 1991, McManimon was defeated for re-election to a fourth term by Mercer County Freeholder Peter Inverso. Inverso ran against Gov. Jim Florio’s $2.8 billion tax increase, which McManimon voted for. The district was also redrawn to remove Franklin Township and add Monroe Township, making it significantly more Republican. After leaving office, McManimon was appointed by Florio to a new commission to redesign New Jersey’s license plates. He never sought public office again.

== Personal life ==
He lived with his wife, Doris, in Hamilton Township, Mercer County, New Jersey; in 2001, McManimon and his wife moved to Surf City, New Jersey. Doris McManimon died in 2012.

At the time of his death, he had three living children and seven grandchildren. His daughter, Deirdre, died from non-Hodgkin's lymphoma in 1988. In 1972, McManimon's niece, Jane, married Governor William T. Cahill's son.

== Death and legacy ==
He died on March 25, 2020, in Surf City, New Jersey at age 93.

On his passing, Governor Phil Murphy said, “Franny McManimon was a giant in Mercer County. He was quick with a smile, an effective legislator, and never forgot the importance of mentoring those who would carry on the work of public service. His was a life well lived. All who knew and loved him are in my thoughts.”

A section of Interstate 195 that passed through Mercer County, New Jersey was named the New Jersey Senator Francis McManimon Highway in honor of McManimon.

New Jersey General Assembly
Preceded by Joseph P. Merlino	Member of the New Jersey General Assembly from the 6B district January 11, 1972–January 8, 1974	Succeeded by Constituency abolished
Preceded by Constituency established	Member of the New Jersey General Assembly from the 13th district January 8, 1974–January 12, 1982; Served alongside: S. Howard Woodson, Helen Chiarello Szabo, Gerald R. Stockman	Succeeded by Richard Van Wagner; Bill Flynn
New Jersey Senate
Preceded by Walter E. Foran	Member of the New Jersey Senate from the 14th district January 12, 1982–January 14, 1992	Succeeded by Peter Inverso
