= Anthony J. Cimino =

American politician

Member of the New Jersey General Assembly from the 14th district
- In office January 12, 1988 – January 14, 1992 Serving with Joseph D. Patero and Peter A. Cantu
- Preceded by: Joseph L. Bocchini Jr. John K. Rafferty
- Succeeded by: Paul Kramer; Barbara Wright

Personal details
- Born: November 29, 1947 (age 78) Trenton, New Jersey
- Party: Democratic
- Education: Providence College

Anthony J. "Skip" Cimino (born November 29, 1947) is an American politician who served in the New Jersey General Assembly from the 14th Legislative District from 1988 to 1992.

== Early life and education ==
Cimino earned his undergraduate degree from Providence College and graduated from the New Jersey Military Academy as a commissioned second lieutenant.

== Career ==
Cimino has served as a Mercer County Freeholder and a member of the Hamilton Township School District Board of Education.

=== New Jersey State Assembly ===
Cimino represented New Jersey's 14th legislative district from 1988 to 1992. As an assemblyman, he introduced the nation's first bicycle helmet law for children under the age of 15, a policy which was later adopted in at least twenty other states.

He was unseated in the 1991 Republican wave election in New Jersey.

=== Florio administration ===
After leaving the Assembly, Cimino served as commissioner of personnel in the James Florio administration.

=== Later work ===
For five years, Cimino was the president and chief executive of Robert Wood Johnson University Hospital in Hamilton. After leaving that role, he became a lobbyist with the lobbying firm Kaufman Zita Group.

In 2017, Cimino joined the New Jersey Assembly Majority office under the leadership of Speaker Craig Coughlin as executive director. In 2018, the New Jersey Globe named him the 65th most powerful unelected person in New Jersey. In 2020, the Globe ranked him 38th.

Following the January 6, 2021 storming of the United States Capitol building, Cimino advised all Assembly Democrats to close their district offices until at least January 20.

== Personal life ==
Cimino's wife, Roseann, died on August 1, 2022. Their son, John, has served as a Mercer County Commissioner (formerly Freeholder) since 2009.
