= 1981 New Jersey gubernatorial election =

- November 3, 1981
- Turnout: 64% (▲5pp)
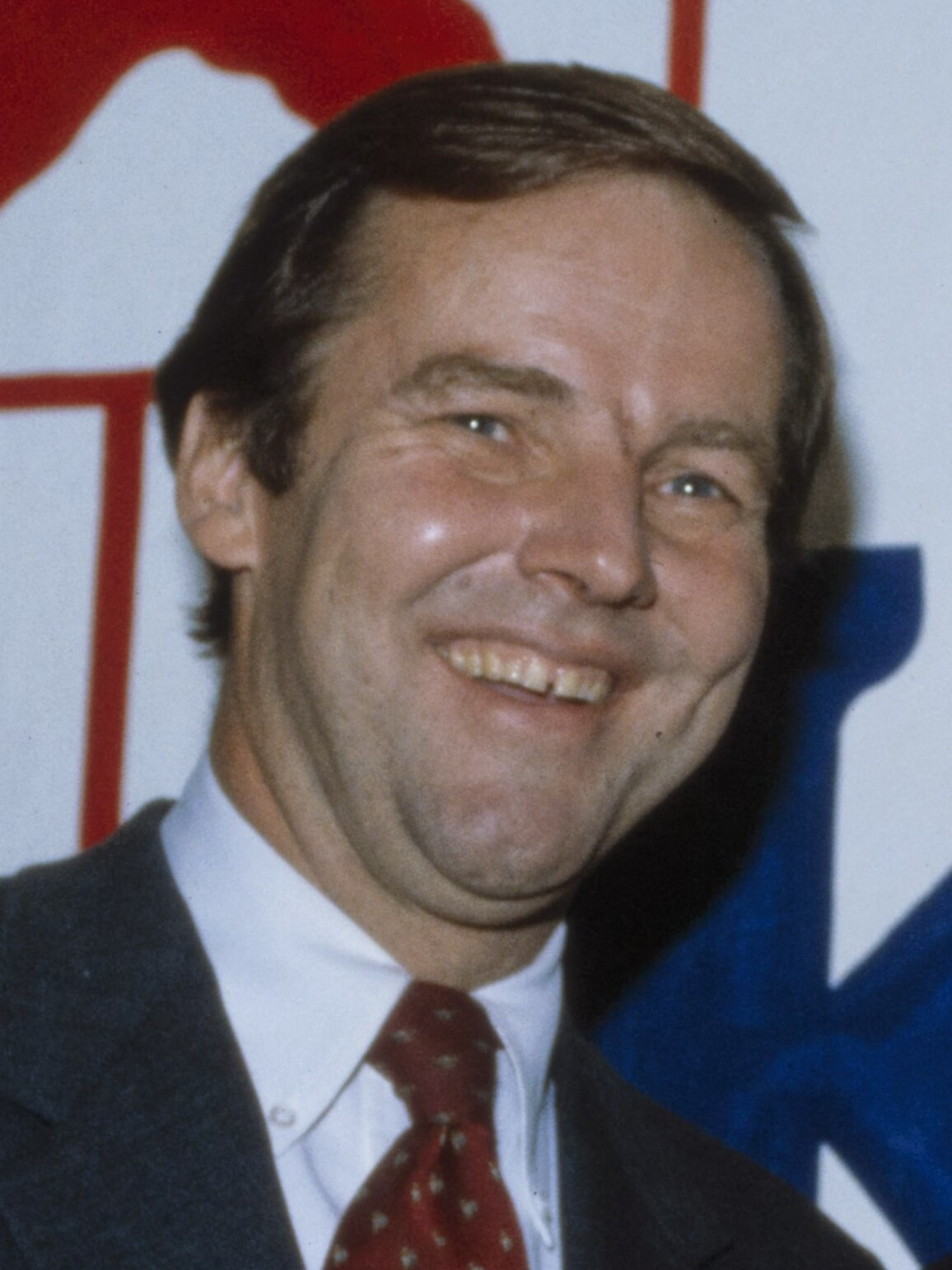

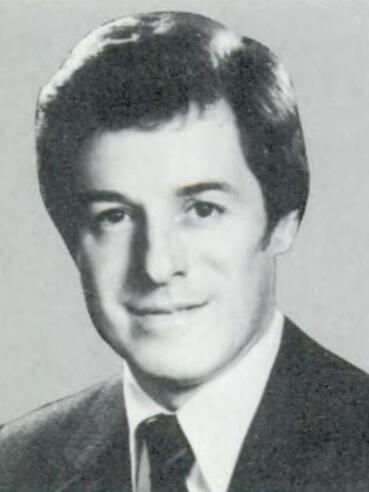
Candidate	Thomas Kean	James Florio
Party	Republican	Democratic
Popular vote	1,145,999	1,144,202
Percentage	49.46%	49.38%
- Kean: 50–60% 60–70% Florio: 40–50% 50–60% 60–70% 70–80%
Governor before election
Brendan Byrne
Democratic
Elected Governor
Thomas Kean
Republican

The 1981 New Jersey gubernatorial election was held November 3, 1981. Republican Speaker of the New Jersey General Assembly Thomas Kean narrowly defeated Democratic U.S. Representative James Florio, 49.46%–49.38%, following a recount. Kean's final margin of victory was 1,797 votes out of more than two million votes cast. As of 2026, the 1981 gubernatorial election remains the closest gubernatorial contest in New Jersey history.

Primary elections were held June 2, 1981. The 1981 primaries were unique in New Jersey history (prior to 2025) in lacking county lines, whereby county party organizations endorsed candidates for preferential ballot positions, reliably delivering them a large percentage of the vote. As a result, a record number of candidates ran for the Democratic and Republican nominations, and the primaries were highly competitive. Kean and Florio prevailed, each with less than one-third of the vote.

The general election was framed as a referendum on the new presidency of Ronald Reagan and, in particular, Reagan's cuts to federal spending. On election night, the results were too close to call, but Kean led by fewer than 1,700 votes. Florio petitioned for a recount, which expanded Kean's lead slightly; Florio conceded the race on November 30.

Kean went on to serve two terms as governor from 1982 to 1990, whereupon he was succeeded by Florio, who won the 1989 election in a landslide.

== Democratic primary ==
=== Candidates ===
- Herbert J. Buehler, former state senator from Point Pleasant Beach
- John J. Degnan, New Jersey Attorney General
- Frank J. Dodd, state senator from West Orange
- James Florio, U.S. Representative from Runnemede
- Kenneth A. Gibson, Mayor of Newark
- William J. Hamilton, state senator from New Brunswick
- Ann Klein, Human Services Commissioner, former Assemblywoman from Morristown, and candidate for governor in 1973
- Stella E. Mann
- Barbara McConnell, state assemblywoman from Flemington
- Joseph P. Merlino, president of the New Jersey Senate from Trenton
- Rose Zeidwerg Monyek
- Robert A. Roe, U.S. Representative from Wayne and candidate for governor in 1977
- Thomas F. X. Smith, Mayor of Jersey City

==== Withdrew ====
- Donald Lan, Secretary of State of New Jersey (withdrew April 1981)
- Charles B. Yates, state senator from Edgewater Park

Both Robert Roe and Jim Florio, who had run in 1977 against incumbent governor Byrne, ran again in 1981. Roe entered the race alongside New Jersey Senate President Joseph P. Merlino in late February. Merlino, who served as acting governor during Byrne's frequent trips out of state, took the opportunity to announce his campaign from the governor's podium at the state Capitol Building.

=== Campaign ===
The incredibly large primary field led candidates to define themselves on the issues, taking bold positions and trying to make the competition look unexciting by comparison. Most of the campaign was dominated by Florio and Roe, the best known candidates on the basis of their 1977 challenge to Byrne. However, they remained in Washington, D.C. for much of the campaign, allowing a number of challengers to gain attention.

For months, Gov. Byrne declined to endorse a candidate to succeed him. Instead, he praised several candidates: Degnan, Florio and Merlino for preserving the Pine Barrens; Merlino for his position on firearms; William J. Hamilton as a tax reformer; and Gibson as an urban planner. Eventually, Byrne threw his support behind Degnan and urged some other candidates to stand down.

Merlino ran a campaign focused on his record as President of the New Jersey Senate, making him sherpa of the Byrne legislative agenda and sometimes acting governor. He emphasized his sponsorship of laws banning handguns and a prescription drug assistance bill targeted at senior citizens. His strategy was to get 70 percent of the vote in his native Mercer County and 20 and 25 percent in the New York and Philadelphia television markets, respectively.

As the primary campaign came to a close, no clear favorite had emerged.

==== Crime and guns ====
Most Democratic candidates stressed the need to fight crime, supporting restoration of the death penalty, mandatory sentences without parole for gun crimes, limits on plea-bargaining, and tougher treatment of violent juvenile defenders. Merlino, for instance, emphasized his sponsorship of a ban on the sale or importation of handguns. Some candidates who supported a national ban nevertheless called Merlino's ban unworkable. It drew opposition from many rural legislators and sportsmen's and gun clubs and support from the National Coalition to Ban Handguns.

Two candidates broke from the pack on crime in different ways. In May, Florio was the sole Democrat endorsed by the National Rifle Association of America; the organization endorsed all of the Republican candidates. Gibson maintained his opposition to the death penalty.

=== Endorsements ===
List of John J. Degnan endorsements

Governors

- Brendan Byrne, Governor of New Jersey
List of Jim Florio endorsements

Organizations

- National Rifle Association of America
List of Joseph Merlino endorsements

Organizations

- National Coalition to Ban Handguns

Individuals

- Harry Nilsson, singer and songwriter
List of Robert A. Roe endorsements

U.S. Representatives

- James J. Howard, U.S. Representative from Spring Lake Heights
- William J. Hughes, U.S. Representative from Ocean City

=== Campaign finance ===
Primary campaign finance activity
Candidate	Spent
Jim Florio	$1,113,925
John Degnan	$1,104,063
Thomas F. X. Smith	$1,085,105
Joseph Merlino	$997,744
Robert Roe	$990,187
Kenneth Gibson	$782,393
Bill Hamilton	$556,011
Frank Dodd	$536,593
Donald Lan	$447,197
Barbara McConnell	$208,740
Ann Klein	$167,340
Herbert Buehler	$9,137
Stella Mann	—N/a
Rose Zeidweg Monyek	—N/a
Source: New Jersey Election Law Enforcement Commission

=== Results ===
Florio: 10–20%; 20–30%; 30–40%; 40–50%; 50–60%; 60–70%; 70–80%; 80–90%; Roe: 20–30%; 70–80%; Gibson: 20–30%; 40–50%; Hamilton: 10–20%; 20–30%; Smith: 30–40%; McConnell: 40–50%; Merlino: 40–50%

Democratic Party primary results
Party	Candidate	Votes	%
Democratic	James Florio	164,179	25.92
Democratic	Robert A. Roe	98,660	15.58
Democratic	Kenneth A. Gibson	95,212	15.03
Democratic	Joseph P. Merlino	70,910	11.20
Democratic	John J. Degnan	65,844	10.40
Democratic	Thomas F. X. Smith	57,479	9.08
Democratic	Frank J. Dodd	23,866	3.77
Democratic	William J. Hamilton	17,395	2.75
Democratic	Barbara McConnell	16,123	2.55
Democratic	Ann Klein	14,844	2.35
Democratic	Herbert J. Buehler	4,266	0.67
Democratic	Stella E. Mann	2,375	0.38
Democratic	Rose Zeidwerg Monyek	2,129	0.34
Total votes		633,282	100.00

Turnout was much higher than projected. Neil Upmeyer, director of the State Division of Elections, had predicted 575,000 Democrats would vote, and some campaign consultants projected the number would actually be much smaller.

Florio won, dominating in South Jersey and displaying surprising strength throughout the state. In his victory speech, Florio argued that the fall campaign would be a referendum on the Reagan administration's spending cuts, which had implicitly shifted the burden of government to the states. "[New Jersey] will be the first state to confront the problems of the 80s," he said. "Whether or not we agree with the policies coming out of Washington, a massive shift in responsibility is taking place."

== Republican primary ==
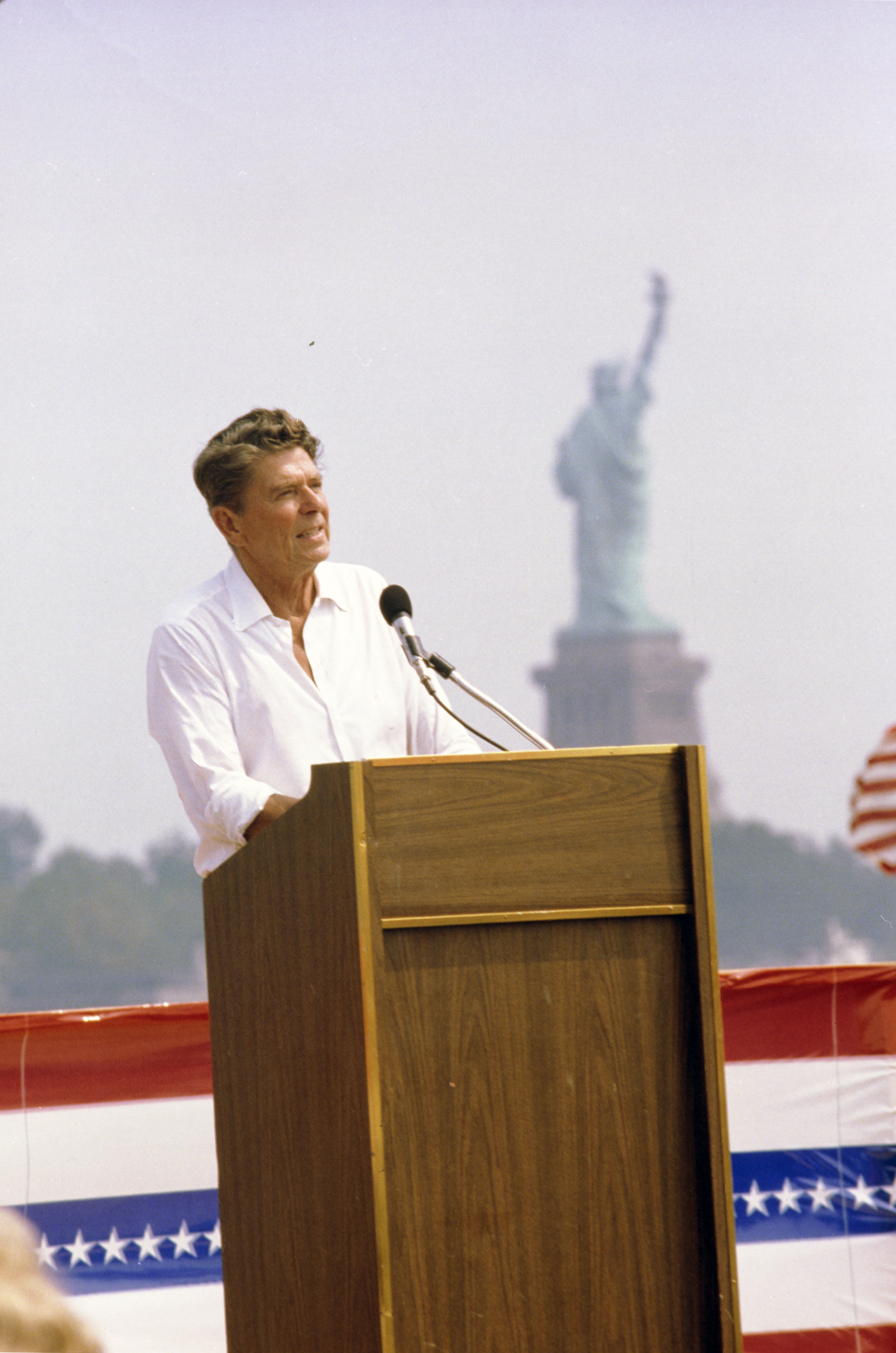
Ronald Reagan, pictured here campaigning in September 1980 in Jersey City, won a large victory in New Jersey. His election and the early stages of his presidency served as the backdrop for the 1981 campaign, in which nearly all of the Republican field focused on their affinity with the President.

=== Candidates ===
- Anthony Imperiale, assemblyman from Newark
- Thomas Kean, former speaker of the New Jersey General Assembly from Livingston
- Lawrence F. "Pat" Kramer, mayor of Paterson and former Commissioner of Community Affairs
- Richard McGlynn, former New Jersey Superior Court judge
- Barry T. Parker, state senator from Mount Holly
- John K. Rafferty, mayor of Hamilton Township
- Bo Sullivan, businessman
- James Wallwork, state senator from Short Hills

==== Withdrew ====
- Donald J. Albanese, assemblyman from Belvidere (ran for New Jersey Senate)

==== Declined ====
- Raymond Bateman, former state senator and nominee for governor in 1977

The first candidate to enter the race for the Republican nomination was Assemblyman Donald J. Albanese, who announced even before the conclusion of the 1980 election.

Tom Kean, the former Assembly Speaker and runner-up in the 1977 primary, announced his campaign for the 1981 nomination in January. His announcement was shortly followed by that of Pat Kramer, the four-term mayor of Paterson. Both candidates entered the race as moderates, though emphasizing their appeal to supporters of President-elect Ronald Reagan following his overwhelming victory in the state.

The surprise entry into the race was businessman Bo Sullivan, whose political involvement had been limited to service as finance chair of the Essex County Republican organization. Sullivan laid the groundwork for his campaign at the 1980 Republican National Convention in Detroit, where despite being a complete unknown, he fêted the New Jersey delegates with a lavish poolside dinner. Beginning in January, Sullivan spent over $1 million of his own money to fund a television ad campaign throughout the state. Former senator James Wallwork, an Essex County resident like Kean and Sullivan, ran as a firm conservative and Reagan supporter.

John K. Rafferty, mayor of suburban Hamilton Township, had run Reagan's New Jersey campaign for a time before being replaced by Raymond J. Donovan, who had become the most powerful Republican in the state after Reagan appointed him United States Secretary of Labor.

The candidate least aligned with Reagan was former judge Richard McGlynn of Short Hills, who referred to one candidate forum as a "Ronald Reagan sound-alike contest."

=== Campaign ===
The candidates focused on presenting themselves as close, either personally or ideologically, to the new Reagan administration. Though he had been a loyal supporter of President Gerald Ford during the 1976 primary, Kean hired Roger Stone, who had served as Reagan's northeast coordinator and quoted Reagan in his campaign announcement. Kramer cited his experience as a business and municipal executive as similar to Reagan's as Governor of California. Both Kramer and Kean embraced capital punishment as a solution to crime and drug trafficking in the state.

Kramer's campaign, which had broad establishment support in all regions of the state, suffered a setback when the legislature passed an open-primary law, which effectively abolished the powerful "county line" for the 1981 primary. At that point, Kramer had already secured nine out of 21 county endorsements, while none of the other candidates had more than two. "We were driving to lock the thing up by the filing deadline," Kramer said, "and then they changed the law on me."

Kramer's reputation also suffered from the perception of Paterson and Passaic County as corrupt, though he aggressively distanced himself from an ongoing probe into highway bid-rigging by voluntarily testifying before a grand jury. He referred to the bid-rigging conspiracy and attendant whisper campaign as "a cancer that was killing me."

Taxes, crime, and economic stagnation remained major issues as they had been in 1977. In May, Kean released his plan for a comprehensive series of tax cuts over four-years, which he said would work "hand in glove" with the supply-side economic program of the Reagan administration. He promised a two-phase halving of the state corporate income tax and a reduction of the sales tax. Kramer was highly critical of the Kean plan, calling it "a blueprint for defeat of the Republican Party in November." He recalled the 1977 campaign, where the early Republican polling lead had vanished after Raymond Bateman's economic program was heavily attacked by Governor Byrne. Kramer said, "If we insist on playing tax plan politics for the sake of a primary victory, as Tom Kean is doing once again, we are asking for a repeat of the 1977 Republican disaster." Kramer instead proposed that spending cuts and deregulation must precede any tax cut.

By the end of the primary, no clear dominating issue or leading candidate had become evident. Kean, Kramer, Sullivan, and Wallwork were all considered contenders for the nomination.

==== Hoax Wallwork assassination attempt ====
In April, less than a month after the attempted assassination of Ronald Reagan, Wallwork was the subject of a complicated hoax assassination attempt. Wallwork was speaking at the Veterans Administration hospital in East Orange when a patient yelled, “There’s a man with a gun and he’s going to shoot the senator.” Wallwork was safely escorted from the building. The hospital's chief of police, Joseph Lancellotti, claimed to have unsuccessfully wrestled with the assassin before he escaped. Wallwork was assigned a police security detail to guard his home and escort him to campaign events. However, a Federal Bureau of Investigation inquest revealed that Lancelotti's claims were a hoax; further investigation revealed that he had a history of mental illness and similar hoaxes, including claims that he was shot at and kidnapped. He had previously served a prison sentence for calling in a false bomb threat.

=== Campaign finance ===
Primary campaign finance activity
Candidate	Spent
Bo Sullivan	$2,163,274
Pat Kramer	$1,150,256
Tom Kean	$1,131,310
James Wallwork	$1,025,775
Jack Rafferty	$430,935
Barry Parker	$415,657
Richard McGlynn	$388,230
Anthony Imperiale	$17,587
Source: New Jersey Election Law Enforcement Commission

=== Results ===
Kean: 20–30%; 30–40%; 40–50%; Kramer: 20–30%; 40–50%; Parker: 50–60%; Rafferty: 30–40%

Republican primary results
Party	Candidate	Votes	%
Republican	Thomas Kean	122,512	30.75
Republican	Lawrence Francis Kramer	83,565	20.98
Republican	Bo Sullivan	67,651	16.98
Republican	James Wallwork	61,816	15.52
Republican	Barry T. Parker	26,040	6.54
Republican	Anthony Imperiale	18,452	4.63
Republican	John K. Rafferty	12,837	3.22
Republican	Richard McGlynn	5,486	1.38
Total votes		398,359	100.00

In his victory speech, Kean praised his opponents and said the fall campaign would be a referendum on the Byrne administration. "People are sick in this state about the loss of jobs, the rise in taxes, the expansion of government and the fear of crime that abounds in this state," he said.

== General election ==
=== Candidates ===
- James Florio, U.S. Representative from Runnemede (Democratic)
- Bill Gahres, electrician and ditchdigger (Down With Lawyers)
- Harry J. Gaynor, former mayor of Plainfield (Leadership By Example)
- Jasper C. Gould, retired well-driller (Contempt of Court)
- James E. Harris, Ford assembly line worker from Metuchen (Socialist Workers)
- Thomas Kean, former Speaker of the New Jersey Assembly (Republican)
- James A. Kolyer III, Cranford High School industrial arts teacher (Middle Class Candidate)
- Jules Levin, apartment complex manager and perennial candidate (Socialist Labor)
- Jack Moyers, real estate investor (Libertarian)
- Ernest D. Pellerino, machinist (Law & Order)
- Paul B. Rizzo, retired federal textile inspector (Independent-Honest-Available)
- Charles C. Stone Jr., gun shop owner (Federalist)

==== Withdrew ====
- Chester Grabowski, publisher of the Clifton Post Eagle and candidate in 1977 (The Suffering Majority) (withdrew in October, endorsed Florio)

=== Campaign ===
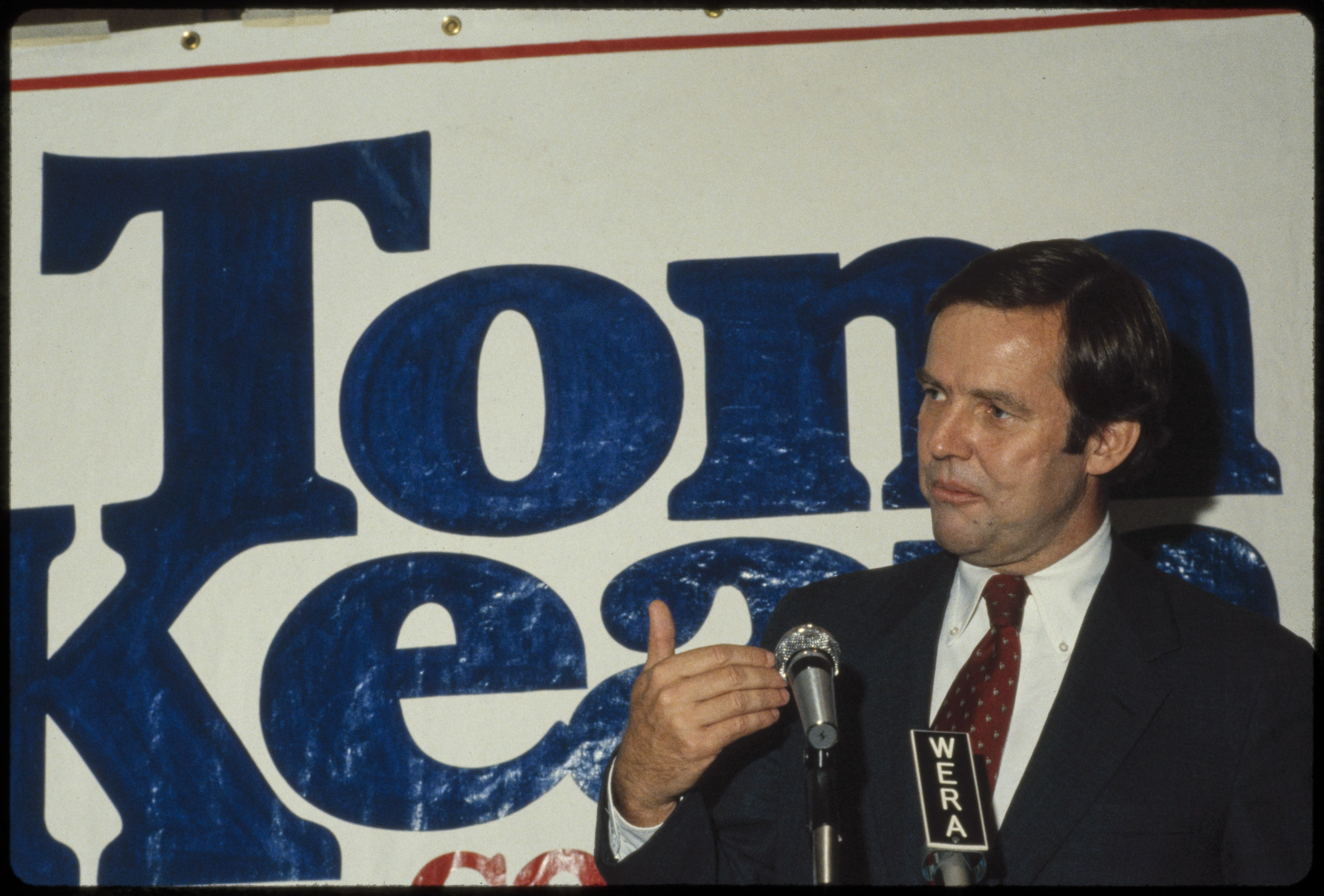
Kean campaigning in September

The candidates primarily sought to contrast themselves on economic issues, down to the personal contrast between Kean as the scion of a wealthy political dynasty and Florio as the upstart grandson of ethnic immigrants. Kean continued his praise of Reagan's economic program and worked to link Florio to the Byrne administration, while Florio pointed to his record in Congress as an opponent of Reagan's agenda and leading proponent of environmental regulation. In one early television ad, Kean was shown playing bocce, an indication that he was appealing to ethnic Italian voters.

Despite the initial framing, Kean distanced himself from some of Reagan's platform as Reagan became less popular with Democrats in the state. Kean campaigned on a theme of change from the previous eight years of the Byrne administration, and Florio attempted to counter this message with television spots projection Florio as the candidate for change instead.

In the final days of the campaign, Vice President George H. W. Bush and U.S. Senator Bill Bradley campaigned with Kean and Florio, respectively. Bush and Kean emphasized that the race was about local issues, rather than a referendum on the White House; Bradley and Florio argued the opposite.

=== Debates ===
In their first debate at Monmouth College, the lead candidates focused on economic issues. Kean blamed the state of the New Jersey economy of Byrne's tax and regulatory policies. Florio countered that a "drastic, across-the-board" corporate tax cut would threaten bankruptcy. Both candidates postured themselves as tough on crime, supporting capital punishment and new prison construction. Both supported Reagan's handling of the air controllers' strike, though only Kean did so enthusiastically.

A second debate before the New Jersey State Chamber of Commerce likewise focused on the economy. Florio attacked Kean's program as "voodoo economics" and compared it to similar plans which he said caused "financial chaos" in Wisconsin and Minnesota. Kean repeatedly challenged Florio to rule out an increase in the income tax, but Florio declined. After the debate, he said, "I am not prepared to unequivocally say that in the Florio administration there will never, never be a tax increase—that would be irresponsible."

=== Polling ===
Poll source	Date(s) administered	Sample size	Margin of error	Jim Florio (D)	Tom Kean (R)	Undecided
Rutgers/Eagleton	September 15–27, 1981	840 RV	±3.5%	44%	36%	18%
The New York Times	October 13–18, 1981	1,118 RV	±4.0%	48%	40%	12%
Rutgers/Eagleton	October 20–27, 1981	1,205 RV	±3.0%	43%	37%	19%
Rutgers/Eagleton	October 20–27, 1981	680 RV	±4.0%	46%	40%	14%

=== Campaign finance ===
Primary campaign finance activity
Candidate	Spent
Tom Kean	$2,370,888
Jim Florio	$2,370,810
Source: New Jersey Election Law Enforcement Commission

=== Results ===
==== Initial results ====
On election night, the results were extremely close. At least two television networks inaccurately declared Florio the winner.

Kean proceeded to his campaign headquarters in Livingston to deliver a prepared concession speech, but was stopped by his campaign manager. By the end of the night, Kean held a lead of 1,677 votes, and neither candidate would concede the race.

==== Ballot Security Task Force ====
Immediately after the election, New Jersey Democrats accused the Republican National Committee of intimidating minority voters in Newark, Camden, and Trenton via the Ballot Security Task Force, a private organization which sent out mailers to voters in these cities and posted armed off-duty police officers and large signs at certain precincts.

Litigation arising from the Ballot Security Task Force activities led to the Republican National Committee operating under a consent decree through 2018 constraining its use of a variety of tactics it deployed in the New Jersey 1981 gubernatorial campaign.

==== Recount ====
Florio, who later admitted he "assumed [he] was going to win," filed a petition for a formal recount in court. The process took another 27 days. In that time, both candidates set up transition offices to prepare to take office. On one occasion, both men showed up for a hotel ribbon-cutting ceremony with scissors.

Florio conceded on November 30 as Kean's lead grew slightly. "The people have selected Tom Kean," he said. Though the recount was still ongoing, Florio said that there was no longer any doubt that Kean had won and abandoned his request for a manual recount in Salem, Sussex, and Warren counties. Despite his concession, Florio called for further inquiries into the activities of the Ballot Security Task Force.

After 27 days, Kean was declared the winner on December 2. He prevailed by a margin of 1,797 votes.

New Jersey gubernatorial election, 1981
Party	Candidate	Votes	%	±%
Republican	Thomas Kean	1,145,999	49.46%	▲7.65
Democratic	James Florio	1,144,202	49.38%	▼6.33
Independent	Bill Gahres	4,525	0.20%	▲0.14
Independent	Chester Grabowski (withdrawn)	4,496	0.19%	▼0.21
Libertarian	Jack Moyers	2,377	0.10%	▼0.17
Independent	Paul B. Rizzo	2,336	0.10%	▼0.07
Independent	Harry J. Gaynor	2,209	0.10%	N/A
Independent	James A. Kolyer III	2,144	0.09%	N/A
Socialist Labor	Julius Levin	2,073	0.09%	▼0.02
Independent	Charles C. Stone, Jr.	1,948	0.08%	N/A
Socialist Workers	James E. Harris	1,681	0.07%	N/A
Independent	Ernest D. Pellerino	1,647	0.07%	N/A
Independent	Jasper C. Gould	1,602	0.07%	▼0.04
Plurality				
Turnout		2,317,239	100.00%	
Republican gain from Democratic		Swing		

==== Results by county ====
County	Kean votes	Kean %	Florio votes	Florio %	Other votes	Other %
Atlantic	33,466	51.5%	30,716	47.3%	809	1.2%
Bergen	169,556	54.1%	141,018	45.0%	2,609	0.8%
Burlington	45,949	46.2%	52,421	52.8%	1,006	0.9%
Camden	46,100	30.4%	104,222	68.7%	1,304	0.9%
Cape May	18,488	59.2%	12,274	39.3%	449	1.3%
Cumberland	16,109	46.1%	18,460	52.8%	401	1.2%
Essex	92,185	41.1%	129,969	57.9%	2,169	1.0%
Gloucester	21,017	32.0%	44,259	67.3%	471	0.7%
Hudson	54,740	34.8%	101,045	64.2%	1,706	1.1%
Hunterdon	17,785	66.7%	8,330	31.2%	557	2.0%
Mercer	43,156	43.8%	53,897	54.8%	1,378	1.4%
Middlesex	89,618	47.7%	95,592	50.9%	2,763	1.5%
Monmouth	88,873	55.9%	67,970	42.8%	2,090	1.3%
Morris	86,882	67.1%	41,310	31.9%	1,362	1.0%
Ocean	78,757	59.5%	52,036	39.3%	1,610	1.3%
Passaic	62,273	50.8%	58,573	47.8%	1,695	1.4%
Salem	9,841	47.6%	10,334	50.0%	503	2.4%
Somerset	43,697	62.5%	25,121	36.0%	1,045	1.5%
Sussex	21,923	69.3%	9,111	28.8%	581	1.8%
Union	91,940	53.4%	78,251	45.4%	2,030	1.2%
Warren	13,649	58.2%	9,296	39.7%	500	2.2%

==== Counties that flipped from Democratic to Republican ====
- Atlantic
- Bergen
- Cape May
- Hunterdon
- Monmouth
- Ocean
- Union
- Warren
