= No Frills Prison Act =

- Citation: https://www.congress.gov/bill/104th-congress/house-bill/663/
- Introduced by: Dick Zimmer

The No Frills Prison Act is the name of several failed house resolution proposals that never became law in the United States. The earliest version was a bill introduced in 1995 by Congressman Dick Zimmer banning from federal prisons in-cell cable television; R, X, and NC-17 rated movies; instruction or training in martial arts; weightlifting equipment; in-cell coffee pots or heating elements; and electronic musical instruments.

Nearly identical bills were introduced seven times between 1995 and 2004, but none of these proposals ever gained even a modicum of legislative support and all have died in committee. No variation of this legislation has ever completed its progression through Congress, so these proposals never became law.

In February 1995, Congressman Zimmer proposed a much more vague codification, in the form of House Amendment 127 to House Bill 667, part of the Republican initiative commonly termed the "Contract with America" crime bill. This bill, as amended, passed in the House of Representatives; but on reaching the Senate, the bill was read twice, and then referred to the Senate Judiciary Committee, where it also died in committee.

Congressional Session	Resolution	Status
104th	H.R. 663	Bill died in committee, 1995
105th	H.R. 169	Bill died in committee, 1997
105th	H.R. 816	Bill died in committee, 1997
106th	H.R. 370	Bill died in committee, 1999
107th	H.R. 458	Bill died in committee, 2001
107th	H.R. 1031	Bill was renamed to "Federal No Frills Prisons Act" and died in committee, 2001
108th	H.R. 2296	Bill died in committee, 2003

Despite the fact that this bill never became law, it has in effect been selectively adopted by certain Federal correctional facilities. For example, the inmate orientation brochure for MDC Brooklyn informs inmates that the facility does not allow for weightlifting and other amenities, and specifically, albeit erroneously, attributes these facility rules to the requirements of the "Zimmer Amendment." Meanwhile, the inmate orientation brochure for FCI Englewood indicates that weightlifting and other facility recreational amenities are available throughout most waking hours of each day, provided that inmates do not use the weightlifting equipment to perpetrate acts of violence against facility staff.

The issue of prison reform, and the original version of the bill, were the subject of a 1995 article in The New York Times.
