= Ann Klein =

American politician (1923–1986)

New Jersey Commissioner of Human Services
- In office November 1, 1976 – February 5, 1981
- Governor: Brendan T. Byrne
- Preceded by: Office created
- Succeeded by: Timothy Carden

New Jersey Commissioner of Institutions and Agencies
- In office 1974 – November 1, 1976
- Governor: Brendan T. Byrne
- Succeeded by: Office abolished

Member of the New Jersey General Assembly from District 10B
- In office January 11, 1972 – January 8, 1974 Serving with James P. Vreeland
- Preceded by: Everett B. Vreeland; Peter W. Thomas
- Succeeded by: District eliminated

Personal details
- Born: 1923
- Died: February 23, 1986 (aged 62–63)
- Education: Barnard College; Columbia University

Ann Rosensweig Klein (1923–February 23, 1986) was an American activist and Democratic politician who represented parts of Morris County in the New Jersey General Assembly from 1972 to 1974. Klein ran unsuccessfully for governor of New Jersey in 1973 and 1981, losing the Democratic nomination each time.

== Early life and education ==
Ann Rosensweig was born in 1923 in Brooklyn, New York.

Klein received an undergraduate degree from Barnard College and graduated from the Columbia University School of Social Work.

== Career ==
After graduating from Columbia, Klein took a job as a caseworker for the Morris County, New Jersey family service agency.

She was active in a number of charitable groups, including the New Jersey League of Women Voters, whose board she joined in 1964. From 1967 to 1971, Klein was president of league. She resigned that position in 1971, when she ran for the New Jersey General Assembly. In 1971, she was appointed to the New Jersey Tax Policy Commission.

=== New Jersey General Assembly ===
Klein won the 1971 election to represent District 10B, which was one of two districts in Morris County and included her hometown of Morristown. In doing so, Klein became the first member of her party to represent Morris in sixty years. As a member of the Assembly, she supported a bill removing the requirement for women to disclose their marital status when registering to vote. She also supported a stronger campaign finance disclosure law.

In the Assembly, Klein was known as a liberal and associated with the "[George] McGovern wing" of the New Jersey Democratic Party. In 1972, she was elected as a delegate at the Democratic National Convention, where she had pledged to support McGovern.

=== 1973 gubernatorial campaign ===
In 1973, Klein ran for Governor of New Jersey, seeking to become the first woman to win a major party's nomination for governor. In addition to support from women's organizations, Klein enjoyed the support of the liberal and reform segments of the party which had supported McGovern in 1972.

During the primary, Klein disdained traditional party machine methods, such as the use of the county line system for ballot position. In January, she refused to appear before a candidate-screening committee which critics had argued was calculated to enhance the candidacy of Ralph DeRose, the candidate of the Essex County political machine. She criticized the Republican incumbent, William T. Cahill, for ineffective leadership and failure to deliver services. Although she was more aligned with the liberal Cahill than DeRose, she pledged to support the Democratic nominee.

She placed second to Brendan Byrne in the Democratic Party primary.

=== Byrne cabinet ===
After Byrne won the general election, he nominated Klein as commissioner of the Department of Institutions and Agencies, which administered state prisons, mental hospitals and welfare programs. She was approved by the New Jersey State Senate in 1974.

As commissioner, she worked to find places for people released from state hospitals in New Jersey and advocated for better treatment of mental health care patients.

In 1976, the Department of Institutions and Agencies was divided, and Klein became the first Commissioner of the Department of Human Services. She resigned 1981 to run for governor. Although Klein claimed she reduced welfare fraud and improved efficiency in the department, which employed 22,000 and spent $1 billion per year, she was a target for political criticism, earning the hostility of legislators in both parties. Near the end of her tenue, she was criticized for warning Medicaid recipients that funds were low and publicly blaming the legislature.

=== 1981 gubernatorial campaign ===
In 1981, Klein ran again for the Democratic nomination for governor. However, Byrne endorsed another member of his campaign, John Degnan. Though he offered to cut an advertisement praising Klein's work as commissioner, she declined the offer. Her campaign was far less successful than in 1981, and she finished tenth in a thirteen candidate field.

In 1982, she was appointed as an administrative law judge in Newark, where she served until retiring in 1984.

== Personal life and death ==
Klein married Robert Klein, a management consultant.

They had two children:

- David, owner of a marine supply business
- Mara Jayne, who married Jeffrey Miller of New York

The Kleins divorced in 1980.

=== Illness and death ===
Around the time of her retirement, Klein was diagnosed with cancer. Despite her diagnosis, she enrolled in law school. She died the age of 62 in Morristown, NJ in 1986.

== Legacy ==
The Ann Klein Forensic Center at Trenton Psychiatric Hospital was named in honor of Klein to recognize her work in New Jersey. In 1988, the Community Health Law Project began awarding the Ann Klein Advocate Award. The award is annually presented to individuals or groups for their exemplary working towards better accessibility for persons living with disabilities.
