= Ben Zimmer =

American linguist and lexicographer (born 1971)

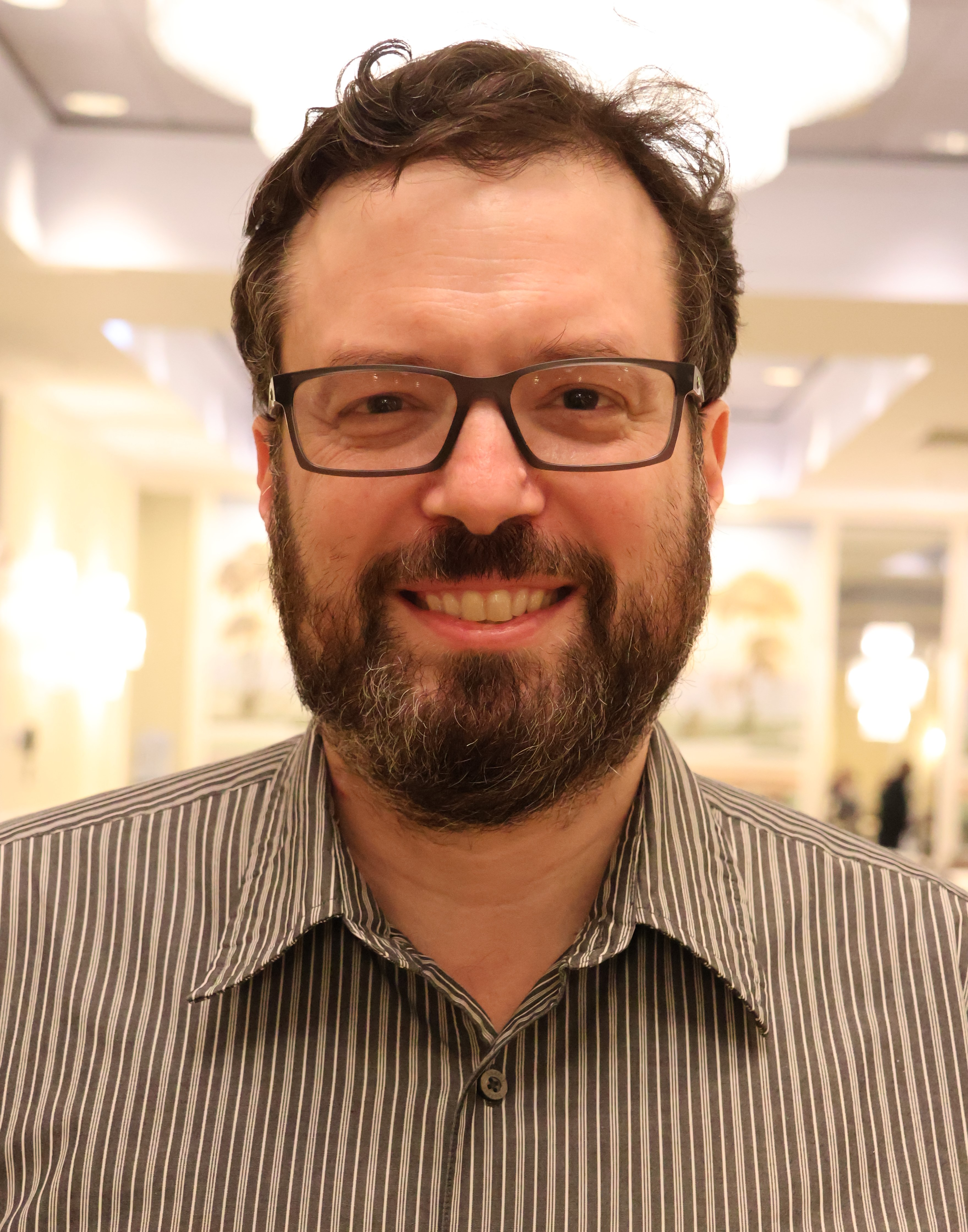
- Zimmer in 2024
- Born: Benjamin Zimmer; 1971 (age 54–55)
- Education: Yale University; University of Chicago
- Occupations: Linguist; lexicographer
- Children: 1
- Father: Dick Zimmer
- Relatives: Carl Zimmer (brother)

Benjamin Zimmer (born 1971) is an American linguist, lexicographer, and language commentator. He is a contributing editor for The Atlantic. He was formerly a language columnist for The Wall Street Journal, The Boston Globe, and The New York Times Magazine, and the editor of American dictionaries at Oxford University Press. Zimmer was also an executive editor of Vocabulary.com and VisualThesaurus.com.

== Early life and education ==
Benjamin Zimmer was the younger of two boys born to the Jewish American politician Dick Zimmer and his wife, Marfy Goodspeed. His brother, journalist Carl Zimmer, is also a science communicator.

Zimmer graduated from Yale University in 1992 with a BA in linguistics, and went on to study linguistic anthropology at the University of Chicago. For his research on the languages of Indonesia, he received fellowships from the National Science Foundation, the Fulbright Program, and the Social Science Research Council.

== Career ==
Zimmer has taught at the University of California, Los Angeles; Kenyon College; and Rutgers University.

In 2005, Zimmer was named a research associate at the Institute for Research in Cognitive Science at the University of Pennsylvania, and became a regular contributor to Language Log, a group weblog on language and linguistics. He was named editor for American dictionaries at Oxford University Press in 2006, and the next year launched "From A to Zimmer", a weekly lexicography column on the Oxford University Press blog.

In 2008, Zimmer was appointed executive producer of the Visual Thesaurus, an interactive reference tool from Thinkmap, Inc. He edits the online content of the Visual Thesaurus and its sister site Vocabulary.com, and writes a regular column on word origins, "Word Routes".

Zimmer's research on word origins was frequently cited by William Safire's "On Language" column for The New York Times Magazine. On March 11, 2010, Magazine editor Gerald Marzorati announced Zimmer's appointment as the new "On Language" columnist, succeeding Safire, the founding and regular columnist until his death in late 2009. Zimmer's last "On Language" column was published on February 27, 2011. In it, Zimmer wrote that the column was "finally coming to a close" and that "it [was] time to bid adieu, after some 1,500 dispatches from the frontiers of language."

On December 18, 2011, The Boston Globe announced that Zimmer would be a regular language columnist for the newspaper's Sunday Ideas section. His Globe column continued until June 28, 2013, when he began a new weekly language column for The Wall Street Journal's Saturday Review section, "Word on the Street".

Zimmer's writing on language has appeared in two blog anthologies: Ultimate Blogs (Vintage, 2008, ISBN 978-0-307-27806-7) and Far from the Madding Gerund (William, James, 2006, ISBN 978-1-59028-055-3). He has also written for Slate, The New York Times Book Review, The New York Times Sunday Review, and The Atlantic.

Zimmer is the chair of the American Dialect Society's New Words Committee and has served on the society's Executive Council. He is also a member of the Dictionary Society of North America.

The Linguistic Society of America gave Zimmer its first ever Linguistics Journalism Award in 2014. In January 2017, Zimmer was one of the speakers in the LSA's inaugural Public Lectures on Language series.

== Personal life ==
Zimmer lives in Jersey City, New Jersey with his wife and a son. He is the brother of science writer Carl Zimmer and the son of former New Jersey congressman Dick Zimmer.
