= William E. Schluter =

American politician (1927–2018)

Member of the New Jersey Senate
- In office January 11, 1972 – January 8, 1974
- Preceded by: District created
- Succeeded by: District abolished
- Constituency: District 6A
- In office January 29, 1991 – January 8, 2002
- Preceded by: Dick Zimmer
- Succeeded by: Leonard Lance
- Constituency: 23rd district

Member of the New Jersey Assembly
- In office January 9, 1968 – January 11, 1972 Serving with John Selecky (1968–70) and Karl Weidel (1970–72)
- Preceded by: District created
- Succeeded by: Walter E. Foran
- Constituency: District 6A
- In office September 10, 1987 – January 29, 1991 Serving with C. Richard Kamin
- Preceded by: Dick Zimmer
- Succeeded by: Leonard Lance
- Constituency: 23rd district

Personal details
- Born: November 5, 1927 Bronxville, New York, U.S.
- Died: August 6, 2018 (aged 90) Pennington, New Jersey, U.S.
- Party: Republican
- Spouse: Nancy Albright Hurd (m. 1950)
- Children: six
- Education: Princeton University (B.A.)

William Everett Schluter (November 5, 1927 – August 6, 2018) was an American Republican Party politician from Pennington, New Jersey, who served in both houses of the New Jersey Legislature from 1968 to 1974 and 1987 to 2002. Over the course of his tenure, he represented parts of Mercer County, as well as all or parts of Hunterdon County, Middlesex County, Morris County, Sussex County, and Warren County. He also ran for U.S. House of Representatives in 1976 and 1978 and ran as an independent candidate for governor in 2001, finishing third behind Democratic nominee Jim McGreevey and Republican nominee Bret Schundler.

He was recognized for his moderate political views and reputation as a self-proclaimed "maverick." He was a longtime advocate for campaign finance reform at the state level.

== Early life and career ==
William Everett Schluter was born on November 5, 1927, in Bronxville, New York, to Frederic E. and Charlotte M. Schluter. He grew up in Princeton, New Jersey, and attended Phillips Exeter Academy and Princeton University, where he played on the hockey team and belonged to the Cannon Club.

Schluter was elected to the Pennington Borough Council in 1963 and served for six years. Although he later developed a reputation as a member of the moderate wing of his party, he supported Barry Goldwater at the 1964 Republican National Convention, defying the majority of the New Jersey delegation which supported William Scranton.

== Political career ==
=== New Jersey General Assembly (1968–72) ===
In 1965, Schluter challenged state senator Sido L. Ridolfi in the 6th legislative district, which encompassed all of Mercer County. However, reapportionment as a result of the United States Supreme Court decision in Reynolds v. Sims apportioned Mercer County an additional legislative district, which was drawn to include all of the county except the heavily Democratic capital city of Trenton and suburb of Ewing Township, for the 1967 elections. Schluter ran again for one of the two General Assembly seats from the new district, defeating Francis J. McManimon by 2,845 votes.

In 1970, Schluter was appointed to the New Jersey Election Law Revision Commission, which produced a landmark report in 1975 recommending ways to reform New Jersey's election laws and curb political corruption. Schluter later wrote in 2017, "This report and the work of the Commission inspired me to take up the banner of reform, which has been the backbone of my political career ever since."

=== New Jersey Senate (1972–74) ===
In 1971, Schluter ran for state senate in a newly reapportioned legislative district combining parts of Mercer County and all of Hunterdon County. Both Sido Ridolfi and Richard J. Coffee declined to seek re-election, leaving the Mercer County seats vacant. Schluter defeated Robert Klein, a former aide to Governor Richard J. Hughes and President Lyndon B. Johnson, by 5,981 votes.

In 1972, he chaired a legislative study of pornography in New Jersey. Following the study, he publicly criticized the film Deep Throat, which was screening at the Prince Theater in West Windsor, as "an abomination and gutter junk" and told The New York Times, "I just hope every judge, every legislator and every public official on his way to Trenton stops in and sees it." Mercer County prosecutor Bruce Schragger declined to pursue legal action against the theater, referring to the state's new anti-pornography law as "extremely vague" and citing his firm belief in freedom of speech.

In 1973, the New Jersey legislature was redistricted once again, making Schluter's district significantly more Republican. It included almost all of Hunterdon County, as well as Republican suburbs in Mercer, Middlesex, and Morris counties. He faced Anne Clark Martindell, an activist who had supported Eugene McCarthy and George McGovern in the prior presidential elections. However, ten days before the election, President Richard Nixon fired Watergate scandal special prosecutor Archibald Cox, as well as attorney general Elliot Richardson and deputy attorney general William Ruckelshaus. The resignations, which came to be known as the Saturday Night Massacre, severely damaged Republicans' standing shortly before the New Jersey elections, and the result was a landslide for the Democratic Party. Schluter lost by 1,757 votes, although Republicans held both General Assembly seats in the district.

After leaving office, Schluter remained active in politics as a private consultant, publicly criticizing Governor Brendan Byrne's campaign finance bill for failing to cover spending for primary elections.

=== Campaigns for U.S. House of Representatives (1976–78) ===
In 1976, Schluter challenged U.S. representative Helen Stevenson Meyner, who had won a Republican-leaning district in the 1974 elections amid ongoing backlash to the Watergate scandal and resignation of Richard Nixon. After former representative Joseph J. Maraziti and state senator James Vreeland declined to run, Schluter won the Republican primary with 70 percent of the vote.

Schluter's campaign was managed by David Demarest, who had been statistician for Millicent Fenwick's successful 1974 campaign, and was profiled by E. J. Dionne in The New York Times for his use of modern campaign techniques, including regular internal polling. The campaign sought to characterize Meyner as too liberal for her constituents. After a hotly contested campaign, Meyner defeated Schluter by a narrow margin of only 5,241 votes.

In 1978, Schluter again sought to challenge Meyner. However, he faced a strong primary challenge from Warren County assistant prosecutor Jim Courter. Courter beat Schluter by only 134 votes and went on to defeat Meyner in the general election.

=== Return to legislature (1987–2002) ===
In 1987, Schluter returned to politics by running for an open Assembly seat. In the primary for two seats, he faced a large field which included incumbent assemblyman C. Richard Kamin, former U.S. representative Joseph Maraziti, Hunterdon County freeholder George Muller, attorney Jeff Moeller, Clinton Township councilwoman Maud Dahme, and Leonard Lance, a gubernatorial aide and son of the former Senate president, Wesley Lance. Although Lance had the endorsement of the Hunterdon County Republican Organization, Schluter won the second nomination by 640 votes to join the ticket with Kamin. In a special election to complete the unexpired term of Dick Zimmer (who had been elected to the Senate), Schluter won with 75 percent.

In 1990, Zimmer was elected to the U.S. House, and Schluter began organizing a campaign for Zimmer's senate seat. In a January 1991 special election convention, Schluter defeated Connie Myers with 127 votes to 80. Karl Weidel, Schluter's former running mate, received 12. Schluter was easily re-elected in 1991, 1993, and 1997.

In 1995, Schluter joined Democratic senator Gordon MacInnes in criticizing the existence of "leadership PACs", which allowed legislative party leadership to control finance committees with unlimited fundraising capacity. In 2000, Schluter chaired a bipartisan group of state leaders calling for greater restrictions on state campaign finance. The organization, Citizens for the Public Good, was particularly critical of the law on leadership PACs and a law allowing individuals to contribute $1,800 per year ($800 more than the federal limit for candidates for president and Congress) to candidates for legislature, county freeholder boards, and school boards.

During his second stint in the Senate, Schluter sponsored a 2000 bill to end the state ban on Sunday hunting, in order to control the growth of the deer population. He also sponsored a 1996 bill on behalf of the Whitehouse Station Fire Company to legalize the "roadside coin toss," a fundraising method where first-aid squads and fire departments would hold out buckets or sheets for motorists to hit with coins.

=== 2001 campaign for governor ===
In 2001, Schluter's seat in the New Jersey Senate was eliminated through redistricting, and his hometown of Pennington was moved to the 15th legislative district. Had he sought re-election, he would have faced Shirley Turner, a fellow incumbent, in a heavily Democratic district which included Trenton and Ewing.

Instead, Schluter decided to run for governor. After initially considering a run in the Republican primary against acting governor Donald DiFrancesco and Jersey City mayor Bret Schundler, he decided to run as an independent in the general election. He hired Doug Friedline, who had managed Jesse Ventura's successful 1998 third-party campaign for Governor of Minnesota, as a political consultant. Ventura endorsed Schluter's campaign as well. Schluter was expected to win some support from moderate and liberal Republicans who viewed Schundler, the winner of the June primary, as an insurgent conservative.

Schluter struggled to raise funds and presented a legal challenge against the state's September 1 deadline for candidates to raise $260,000 in order to receive matching public funds and appear in televised debates. However, his campaign was interrupted by the September 11 attacks, which froze political campaigning in New Jersey. Supporters diverted campaign contributions to disaster relief organizations. By the time the race restarted, Schluter lagged far behind and ultimately garnered only 1 percent of the vote.

=== Later work ===
After leaving office, Schluter continued to chair Citizens for the Public Good.

In 2006, Schluter was appointed to the State Ethics Commission by Governor Jon Corzine. Schluter remained active in New Jersey politics as a public advocate for reforms, including authoring a report with New Jersey Policy Perspective criticizing the common practice of dual office-holding.

He was the author of a book, Soft Corruption: How Unethical Conduct Undermines Good Government and What To Do About It, published in spring 2017 by Rutgers University Press.

== Personal life and death ==
In 1950, Schluter married Nancy Albright Hurd, a graduate of Buffalo Seminary and former Smith College student. They settled in Pennington, New Jersey. In 1973, Nancy served as president of the New Jersey Federation of Republican Women. She was challenged by vice president Noel Gross, the wife of Nelson Gross, in the first contested presidential election in twenty years. Gross defeated her, 700-587, with support from Atlantic and Monmouth counties.

=== Death ===
Schluter died on August 6, 2018, in his Pennington home, following complications from pancreatic cancer.

Upon his death, he was remembered by Leonard Lance as "the consummate gentleman on the playing field of life" and "a close friend and political mentor." Leaders of both parties on the New Jersey Senate eulogized him, with Thomas Kean Jr. referring to him as "everything a true public servant should be," and Stephen Sweeney saying, "He believed in the value of public service, he put progress ahead of partisanship, and he was always willing to work with others with the selfless goals that served the needs of the public."

New Jersey Senate
Preceded by Dick Zimmer	Member of the New Jersey Senate from the 23rd district 1991–2002	Succeeded by Leonard Lance
Preceded by District created	Member of the New Jersey Senate from the 6A district 1972–1974	Succeeded by District abolished
New Jersey General Assembly
Preceded by Dick Zimmer	Member of the New Jersey General Assembly from the 23rd district 1987–1991; With: C. Richard Kamin	Succeeded by Leonard Lance
Preceded by District created	Member of the New Jersey General Assembly from the 6A district 1968–1972; With: John A. Selecky, Karl Weidel	Succeeded by Walter E. Foran
