= Dick Zimmer =

American politician (1944–2025)

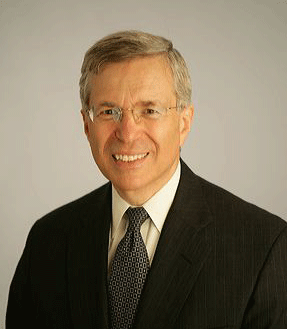

Member of the U.S. House of Representatives from New Jersey's 12th district
- In office January 3, 1991 – January 3, 1997
- Preceded by: Jim Courter
- Succeeded by: Mike Pappas

Member of the New Jersey Senate from the 23rd district
- In office April 23, 1987 – January 3, 1991
- Preceded by: Walter E. Foran
- Succeeded by: William E. Schluter

Member of the New Jersey General Assembly from the 23rd district
- In office January 12, 1982 – April 23, 1987 Serving with Karl Weidel
- Preceded by: Arthur R. Albohn; James J. Barry Jr.
- Succeeded by: William E. Schluter

Personal details
- Born: Richard Alan Zimmer; August 16, 1944 Newark, New Jersey, U.S.
- Died: December 31, 2025 (aged 81) Flemington, New Jersey, U.S.
- Party: Republican
- Spouse: Marfy Goodspeed (m. 1965)
- Children: Carl; Ben
- Education: Yale University (BA, LLB)

Richard Alan Zimmer (August 16, 1944 – December 31, 2025) was an American Republican Party politician from New Jersey, who served in both houses of the New Jersey Legislature and in the United States House of Representatives. He was the Republican nominee for the U.S. Senate from New Jersey in 1996 and 2008.

Zimmer was known for his sponsorship of Megan's Law, a landmark criminal justice reform bill passed in response to the 1994 murder of Megan Kanka. He was known for his fiscal conservatism, opposing spending and taxes which he viewed as excessive and supporting the Personal Responsibility and Work Opportunity Act.

== Background ==
Richard Alan Zimmer was born on August 16, 1944, in Newark, New Jersey, to William and Evelyn Zimmer, the second of two children. In his early years he was raised in Hillside, New Jersey. His father, a physician, died of a heart attack when he was 3 years old. After his father's death, his mother moved from Hillside to Bloomfield, New Jersey, where she supported the family by working as a clerk at the Sunshine Biscuits warehouse. They lived in a Bloomfield garden apartment, which Zimmer called "the New Jersey equivalent of a log cabin."

When Zimmer was 12 years old, his mother married Howard Rubin, a Korean War veteran with three children of his own. The newly combined family moved to Glen Ridge, New Jersey, and Rubin worked at the post office there. Zimmer attended Glen Ridge High School, where he was selected as the class speaker for his graduation ceremony. His mother, suffering from lymphoma, required paramedics to take her from Columbia Presbyterian Hospital to the school auditorium on a stretcher to hear the address. She died several days later.

Zimmer attended Yale University on a full academic scholarship and majored in political science, graduating in 1966. In the summer of 1965, he worked in the Washington, D.C. office of Clifford P. Case, after which he became active in Republican politics. He went on to attend Yale Law School, where he was an editor of the Yale Law Journal.

== Career ==
=== Legal and academic career ===
After receiving his LL.B. in 1969, Zimmer worked as an attorney in New York and New Jersey for several years, first for Cravath, Swaine & Moore and then for Johnson & Johnson.

After leaving Congress in 1997, he worked at the Princeton office of the Philadelphia-based law firm Dechert Price & Rhoads. From 1997 to 2000, Zimmer lectured at Princeton University in the Woodrow Wilson School of Public and International Affairs. In 2001, he joined the Washington, D.C. office of Gibson, Dunn & Crutcher, where he was of counsel.

=== Early political involvement ===
In 1973, he was elected to the Common Cause National Governing Board, a nonpartisan, nonprofit advocacy group and think tank with the mission to make political institutions more open and accountable. From 1974 to 1977, he served as chairman of New Jersey Common Cause. As chairman he successfully lobbied for New Jersey's Sunshine Law, which made government meetings open to the public. He also championed campaign finance reform, working closely with Thomas Kean, then a member of the New Jersey General Assembly. Zimmer served as treasurer for Kean's 1975 reelection campaign.

In 1978, Zimmer made his first bid for public office as a candidate for New Jersey's 13th congressional district, located in the northwestern portion of the state. He sought the Republican nomination to challenge incumbent Democratic representative Helen Stevenson Meyner. However, he withdrew from the race after four months, citing fundraising challenges. His withdrawal likely helped Warren County prosecutor Jim Courter win the Republican nomination over Bill Schluter; Courter went on to defeat Meyner in the general election.

=== New Jersey General Assembly (1982–87) ===
In 1979, Zimmer was a candidate for the New Jersey General Assembly in the 23rd district, challenging Democratic incumbent Barbara McConnell. He was unsuccessful, finishing third behind McConnell and Republican incumbent Karl Weidel. In 1981, the 23rd district was reorganized to become more Republican, losing Princeton Township and Princeton. McConnell ran for the Democratic nomination for governor rather than seeking re-election, and Zimmer, who relocated to Delaware Township was handily elected to succeed her. He was elected easily in 1983 and 1985.

In the Assembly, Zimmer was the prime sponsor of New Jersey's first farmland preservation law, resulting in the permanent preservation of 1,222 farms in the state. Zimmer also sponsored legislation creating the state's radon detection and remediation program, which became a national model. He was chairman of the Assembly State Government Committee from 1986 to 1987.

=== New Jersey Senate (1987–91) ===
In 1987, following the death of state senator Walter E. Foran, Zimmer won a special election to replace him in the New Jersey Senate. He was elected to a full term in November unopposed. In the Senate he served on the Revenue, Finance and Appropriations Committee.

Zimmer was a staunch advocate of direct democracy, favoring initiative and referendum reforms to allow citizens to place issues directly on the ballot via petition. However, by the time Republicans gained control of state government in 1994, he was no longer in the legislature, and his proposal was never approved.

=== U.S. House of Representatives (1990–97) ===
In 1990, Zimmer made his second campaign for the United States House of Representatives from New Jersey's 12th district after Jim Courter decided not to seek re-election. In the Republican primary, Zimmer defeated former New York Giants wide receiver Phil McConkey and assemblyman Rodney Frelinghuysen. In the general election, he defeated Democratic businesswoman Marguerite Chandler by a margin of 66 to 34 percent. After his district was redrawn to stretch across Central Jersey to Monmouth County, Zimmer was re-elected in 1992 and 1994.

Zimmer was best known for writing Megan's Law (U.S. Public Law 104–145), which requires notification when a convicted sex offender moves into a residential area. It was named after Megan Kanka, a seven-year-old New Jersey resident who was raped and murdered by her neighbor, who was a convicted sex offender. He also unsuccessfully introduced the No Frills Prison bill, requiring the elimination of luxurious prison conditions.

As a member of the Ways and Means Committee, he sought the elimination of wasteful spending and undue taxation. He was ranked the most fiscally conservative member of the United States Congress three times by the National Taxpayers Union and was designated a Taxpayer Hero by Citizens Against Government Waste every year he was in office. He also advocated for urban enterprise zone legislation, the decriminalization of some drugs, a single-payer national health program modeled on the Canadian system, and personal savings plans for health insurance.

Zimmer was also a member of the Committee on Science, Space and Technology and the Committee on Government Operations. As a member of the Environment Subcommittee, he introduced environmental risk-assessment legislation later incorporated in the 1996 amendments to the Safe Drinking Water Act and opposed offshore drilling.

=== 1996 U.S. Senate campaign ===
Zimmer first considered running for United States Senate in 1994 against Democratic incumbent Frank Lautenberg. After former governor and Zimmer ally Thomas Kean declined to run, Zimmer was a leading candidate, but when the newly inaugurated governor Christine Todd Whitman endorsed Assembly speaker Chuck Haytaian, he declined to run. Instead, Zimmer began lining up support to challenge Bill Bradley for the state's other Senate seat in 1996.

On August 16, 1995, Bradley announced that he would not seek reelection. Zimmer formally announced his candidacy on February 13, 1996, having already secured the endorsement of Whitman and other leading Republicans. He won the Republican primary with 68 percent of the vote over Passaic County freeholder Richard DuHaime and state senator Dick LaRossa.

In the general election, Zimmer faced Democratic representative Robert Torricelli. David Wald of The Star-Ledger called the 1996 campaign "noisy, vitriolic, and expensive," estimating its cost at over $25 million, which was very expensive for the time. Both candidates were harshly critical, with Zimmer calling Torricelli "foolishly liberal" and Torricelli tying Zimmer to House speaker Newt Gingrich. Zimmer's authorship of Megan's Law was also an issue in the campaign, as was gun control, with Torricelli winning a valuable endorsement from former Ronald Reagan aide and shooting victim James Brady. Public opinion polling generally suggested that Torricelli had a slight lead, with the final Rutgers-Eagleton poll showing a dead heat. Ultimately, Torricelli won comfortably by nearly 300,000 votes, aided by Bill Clinton's landslide victory in the state.

=== 2000 U.S. House campaign ===
Zimmer gave up his House seat to run for the Senate, completing his third term in office on January 3, 1997. He was succeeded by Mike Pappas, who served a single term from 1997 to 1999. Pappas was defeated by Rush Holt Jr. in 1998.

In 2000, Zimmer ran for his former seat in the House of Representatives. He faced Pappas in the Republican primary. Near the end of the campaign, an independent expenditure group backing Zimmer aired attack ads suggesting that Pappas's church was connected to the Ku Klux Klan. Although Zimmer denounced the ads and they were heavily criticized by his own supporter, Tom Kean, they damaged Pappas's campaign. Zimmer won the primary with 62 percent of the vote.

In the general election, the Democratic Congressional Campaign Committee attacked Zimmer for opposing a bill they claimed would reduce instances of breast cancer by expanding access to mammograms. Given his mother's death from lymphoma during his childhood and his three sisters' diagnoses with breast cancer, Zimmer was personally hurt by the accusation. Despite Al Gore winning the district by over 16,000 votes in the presidential race, Holt defeated Zimmer by only 651 votes in the closest congressional race in New Jersey since 1956. After a late November recount slightly expanded Holt's margin, Zimmer conceded.

=== 2008 U.S. Senate campaign ===
In 2008, New Jersey Republicans struggled to recruit a candidate to challenge incumbent Frank Lautenberg. Their first choice, real estate developer Anne Evans Estabrook, withdrew after suffering a stroke, and their second choice, businessman Andy Unanue, withdrew shortly after entering the race following criticism of his New York City residence and spending his entire three-week campaign on vacation in Vail, Colorado. On April 11, 2008, Zimmer entered the race for the Republican nomination after other choices, including Mehmet Oz and Kip Bateman, declined. He was designated by the Unanue campaign to receive their ballot positions and after a short campaign, Zimmer won the Republican nomination with 46 percent of the vote over state senator Joseph Pennacchio.

General election polling initially suggested a competitive race between Zimmer and Lautenberg, who had faced a stiff primary challenge from representative Rob Andrews and faced criticism for his age. However, Lautenberg outraised Zimmer by nearly $6 million and October polling showed Lautenberg with an insurmountable lead. Lautenberg declined to debate Zimmer until the last days of the campaign, when his victory appeared certain. Zimmer ultimately lost by nearly 500,000 votes, with the Lautenberg campaign buoyed by the strong performance of presidential nominee Barack Obama. Despite the loss, Zimmer received over 1.4 million votes, setting a record for most votes cast for a Republican candidate in New Jersey history for any office other than president.

=== Later political involvement ===
On March 11, 2010, Chris Christie appointed Zimmer chairman of the New Jersey Privatization Task Force, charged with developing plans to privatize certain state government operations as a cost-cutting measure.

Zimmer was a consistent opponent and critic of President Donald Trump. He endorsed John Kasich for the Republican nomination in 2016 and unsuccessfully ran to support Kasich as a delegate to the 2016 Republican National Convention. He endorsed Gary Johnson, the Libertarian Party nominee, in the general election. In 2020, Zimmer endorsed Joe Biden against Trump in the presidential election.

In February 2021, Zimmer announced he was running for the New Jersey Senate in the 16th district, planning to face off with Mike Pappas again in the primary. However, he dropped out later that month. His endorsement of Biden in 2020 was cited as making his candidacy nonviable among Republicans.

== Personal life and death ==
Zimmer and his wife Marfy Goodspeed, whom he married in 1965, were longtime residents of Delaware Township in Hunterdon County, New Jersey. They had two sons: Carl Zimmer, a science writer, and Benjamin Zimmer, a linguist and lexicographer.

Zimmer died from myelodysplastic syndrome in Flemington, New Jersey, on December 31, 2025, at the age of 81.

== See also ==
- List of Jewish members of the United States Congress

U.S. House of Representatives
Preceded by Jim Courter	Member of the U.S. House of Representatives from New Jersey's 12th congressional district 1991–1997	Succeeded by Mike Pappas
Party political offices
Preceded by Christine Todd Whitman	Republican nominee for U.S. Senator from New Jersey (Class 2); 1996	Succeeded by Doug Forrester
Preceded by Doug Forrester	Republican nominee for U.S. Senator from New Jersey (Class 2); 2008	Succeeded by Steve Lonegan
