= Karl Weidel =

American politician

Member of the New Jersey General Assembly from the 23rd district
- In office January 12, 1982 – June 13, 1986 Serving with Dick Zimmer
- Preceded by: Arthur R. Albohn; James J. Barry Jr.
- Succeeded by: C. Richard Kamin

Member of the New Jersey General Assembly from the 14th district
- In office January 8, 1974 – January 12, 1982 Serving with Walter E. Foran and Barbara McConnell
- Preceded by: District created
- Succeeded by: Joseph L. Bocchini Jr. Joseph D. Patero

Member of the New Jersey General Assembly from District 6A
- In office January 13, 1970 – January 8, 1974
- Preceded by: John A. Selecky
- Succeeded by: District abolished

Personal details
- Born: September 27, 1923 Trenton, New Jersey
- Died: January 31, 1997 (aged 73) Trenton, New Jersey
- Party: Republican

Karl Weidel III (September 27, 1923 – January 31, 1997) was an American Republican Party politician from New Jersey, who served in the New Jersey General Assembly from 1970 to 1986.

== Biography ==
Weidel was born on September 27, 1923, in Trenton, New Jersey. His father, Karl Weidel, Jr., ran an insurance and real estate brokerage, established in 1915. He attended Trenton Catholic High School, Duke University, and Rutgers Law School. During World War II he joined the United States Navy and became a pilot. After the war, he entered the family business, taking over the insurance division in 1949.

Weidel was a resident of Pennington, Mercer County, New Jersey. He became the first Republican in a generation elected to the Mercer County Board of Chosen Freeholders in 1966. He was first elected to the New Jersey General Assembly in 1969 to serve in the District 6A, represented the 14th Legislative District from 1974 to 1982, and the 23rd Legislative District from 1982 until his resignation from office. In the New Jersey General Assembly he worked on no-fault insurance reform and also supported the "right-to-die" movement during the Karen Ann Quinlan case.

Weidel resigned from the Assembly in 1986 to take a position as executive director of the Unsatisfied Claim and Judgment Fund in the New Jersey Department of Insurance. His vacant seat was filled by C. Richard Kamin. Weidel retired from state government in 1990.

On January 31, 1997, Weidel, at the age of 73 and in worsening health, committed suicide by jumping from the top of a Trenton parking garage.
