= Joseph L. Bocchini Jr. =

American politician

Member of the New Jersey General Assembly from the 14th district
- In office January 12, 1982 – January 12, 1988 Serving with Joseph D. Patero and John K. Rafferty
- Preceded by: Barbara McConnell; Karl Weidel
- Succeeded by: Anthony J. Cimino; Joseph D. Patero

Personal details
- Born: June 26, 1944 (age 82) Trenton, New Jersey
- Party: Democratic
- Education: Trenton Central High School
- Alma mater: Murray State University; University of Baltimore

Joseph L. Bocchini Jr. (born June 26, 1944) is an American attorney and Democratic Party politician who represented New Jersey's 14th legislative district in the New Jersey General Assembly from 1982 to 1988 and served as Mercer County prosecutor from 2003 through 2014.

== Early life and education ==
Bocchini was born and raised in Trenton, New Jersey. His father was a steelworker for over forty years.

After graduating from Trenton Central High School, where he played tennis, Bocchini attended Trenton Junior College and Murray State University, where he graduated with a degree in education. Bocchini taught in Hamilton Township, Mercer County, New Jersey public schools for two or three years. After teaching, he received his Juris Doctor degree from the University of Baltimore in 1971.

== Political career ==
From 1978 to 1982, Bocchini served as general counsel to the Democratic majority in the New Jersey Senate.

=== New Jersey General Assembly ===
In 1981, Bocchini was elected to the New Jersey General Assembly, defeating Paul Kramer by just 660 votes.

From 1982 to 1988, Bocchini represented the 14th district in the New Jersey General Assembly.

As chair of the Assembly Committee on Law, Public Safety and Defense Committee, Bocchini led a 1985 investigation into a $15,000 donation made by Price Waterhouse to the Republican State Committee one month after receiving a $6.5 million state contract to design the Motor Vehicle Division's computer system without competitive bidding. The computer system had been plagued with problems and Bocchini said that he was "very suspect of the manner in which the contributions all of a sudden surfaced."

=== Later career ===
In 1987, Bocchini gave up his Assembly seat to challenge Mercer County Executive Bill Mathesius for re-election. Mathesius narrowly defeated Bocchini by 930 votes. In 1991, Bocchini announced another challenge to Mathesius. However, Mathesius announced two weeks later that he would not seek re-election, and the Republican Party nominated Bob Prunetti, a county freeholder from Ewing. Amid a statewide backlash to the policies of the Jim Florio administration and the Democratic Party, Bocchini did not campaign on his party affiliation. His advertisements emphasized that he was "born and raised in Mercer County, taught school in Hamilton and learned the values of hard work, honesty, loyalty and commitment." Prunetti defeated Bocchini.

In 2004, Bocchini was appointed Mercer County Prosecutor. In 2007, he was recused from an investigation into accusations by a Rider University student that she was sexually assaulted by state troopers because of comments he made to The Star-Ledger describing the investigation as a "nightmare" and claiming that any prosecutor who wanted a case like it “[had] a psychological problem.” He served two five-year terms before informing Governor Chris Christie in 2014 that he would not accept re-appointment to a third term in office. Before his appointment as prosecutor, Bocchini served as a municipal court judge and municipal prosecutor in East Windsor and Washington Township (today known as Robbinsville). In 2015, Bocchini was accused of sexual harassment by a former employee at the county prosecutor's office and two former prosecutors. A civil case resulting from the accusations was settled in 2018 for $155,000.

== Personal life ==
In 2015, Bocchini was inducted into the Steinert High School Athletic Hall of Fame for recognition of his long support of the school's baseball program.
