= John K. Rafferty =

American politician (1938–2021)

John K. "Jack" Rafferty

Mayor of Hamilton Township
- In office January 1, 1976 – December 31, 1999
- Preceded by: Albert DeMartin
- Succeeded by: Glen Gilmore

Member of the New Jersey General Assembly from the 14th district
- In office January 14, 1986 – January 12, 1988 Serving with Joseph L. Bocchini Jr.
- Preceded by: Joseph D. Patero
- Succeeded by: Joseph D. Patero

Personal details
- Born: May 1, 1938 Trenton, New Jersey
- Died: February 17, 2021 (aged 82) Hamilton Township, New Jersey
- Party: Republican
- Education: Trenton Junior College; La Salle University; University of Kentucky

John K. "Jack" Rafferty (May 1, 1938 – February 17, 2021) was an American politician who served as the Mayor of Hamilton Township, New Jersey, from 1976 to 1999 and in the New Jersey General Assembly from the 14th Legislative District from 1986 to 1988.

== Early life and education ==
Rafferty was born on May 1, 1938, to Mae Knox Rafferty and Francis Peter Rafferty, a tool and die maker. His family were Irish, Catholic, and supporters of the Democratic Party. He later described his father as a "dyed-in-the-wool" Democrat.

After growing up in Hamilton Township and graduating from Trenton Catholic High School, Rafferty enlisted in the United States Navy, serving aboard the USS Randolph for two years. After leaving the Navy, he received an associate in arts degree from Trenton Junior College. He graduated from La Salle University with a pre-law degree in 1963 and then received his Juris Doctor degree from University of Kentucky College of Law in 1966.

After law school, Rafferty clerked for U.S. District Court Judge George H. Barlow and worked as a legal analyst for the New Jersey Division of Taxation. Governor William T. Cahill appointed Rafferty as Director of the Division of Administrative Procedure. He left state government in 1974, upon the inauguration of Democratic Governor Brendan Byrne.

== Political career ==
Rafferty made his first run for political office in 1968, when he was an unsuccessful candidate for Mercer County Freeholder.

In 1969, Rafferty was elected to the Hamilton Township council. He was the first Republican elected to the council in 19 years. He served for six terms.

In 1971, Rafferty ran for the New Jersey Assembly to represent Hamilton, Trenton, and Washington Township (District 6B). He ran to fill the seat left vacant by Joseph Merlino. He and Republican running mate Peter Rossi lost the race for the multi-member district to Hamilton recreation director Francis J. McManimon and incumbent S. Howard Woodson.

In 1976, Rafferty won the first open election for mayor of Hamilton following the ratification of the township's new charter, becoming the first Republican mayor of the township in 26 years. He attended the 1976 Republican National Convention as a delegate pledged to President Gerald Ford.

In 1980, after appeals from John P. Sears, Rafferty agreed to serve as the director of Ronald Reagan's New Jersey campaign. Rafferty claimed that he only agreed to serve on the Reagan campaign once he was satisfied that he and Reagan were "philosophically compatible in their politics." Rafferty considered himself a "moderate" Republican who was "moderate-to-liberal" on some issues. After Sears was ousted as Reagan's campaign manager, Rafferty was replaced by Raymond J. Donovan.

Following the indictment of incumbent U.S. Representative Frank Thompson, Rafferty was approached to run for the seat in 1980, replacing lesser-known Republican nominee Chris Smith. Rafferty declined. Smith won the race and represented Hamilton in Congress until 2023, following redistricting.

In 1981, Rafferty ran for Governor of New Jersey. He hoped to capitalize on his association with now-President Reagan, but finished a distant seventh in the Republican primary, which was won by eventual Governor Thomas Kean. After the primary, Kean considered Rafferty for chairman of the New Jersey Republican Party, but the job was ultimately given to Philip D. Kaltenbacher.

In 1985, while still serving as Mayor, Rafferty was elected to the New Jersey Assembly amid a Republican wave election. He unseated incumbent Joseph D. Patero. He served one term and did not run for re-election in 1987. Rafferty intended to challenge Francis McManimon for State Senate in 1987, but after polling showed that both his Assembly seat and mayoral seat were at risk, he refocused on his work as mayor.

In 1999, Rafferty retired rather than run for re-election to a seventh term as Mayor.

== Retirement ==
After retiring from office, Rafferty remained active in local politics and served as executive director of the Hamilton Partnership, a business group that promotes cooperation among its members and works with the township to attract more businesses to town. He was elected to the New Jersey Republican Party State Committee in 2017.

== Personal life ==
Rafferty married Doris Tramontana, with whom he had two children, Megan and Daniel.

== Death ==
Rafferty died on February 17, 2021, in Hamilton Township, New Jersey, at age 82.
