= Peter Inverso =

American politician

Member of the New Jersey Senate from the 14th district
- In office January 14, 1992 – January 8, 2008
- Preceded by: Francis J. McManimon
- Succeeded by: Bill Baroni

Member of the Mercer County Board of Chosen Freeholders
- In office 1981–1983
- In office 1987–1989

Personal details
- Born: December 24, 1938 (age 87) Trenton, New Jersey
- Party: Republican
- Education: Rider University (BS)

Peter A. Inverso (born December 24, 1938) is an American banker and Republican Party politician, who represented New Jersey's 14th legislative district in the New Jersey Senate from 1992 to 2008.

== Early life ==
Inverso was born in Trenton, New Jersey and received a B.S. degree from Rider University in Commerce and Accounting.

He served in the New Jersey National Guard from 1956 to 1962.

== Political career ==
Inverso served two stints on the Mercer County Board of Chosen Freeholders from 1981 to 1983 and again from 1987 to 1989.

In 1991, Inverso unseated incumbent State Senator Francis J. McManimon. Inverso won by nearly 10,000 votes amid a statewide landslide for Republicans, in a race that also featured Republican former State Senator Peter P. Garibaldi running as an independent. Among the volunteers on Inverso's campaign was future U.S. Senator Ted Cruz, then a student at Princeton University.

He was re-elected in 1993, 1997, 2001, and 2003. His most competitive race came in 2001, when his district was altered to include West Windsor and he defeated Sam Plumeri by under 3,000 votes as Democrat Jim McGreevey won a statewide landslide.

Senator Inverso was Assistant Majority Leader from 1998 to 2001, and served as the Deputy Minority Leader, from 2004 to 2008. Inverso served on the Senate Law and Public Safety and Veterans' Affairs Committee. He did not seek reelection in 2007, and was succeeded by Assemblyman Bill Baroni, another Republican.

== After politics ==
As of 2007, Inverso was the President of Roma Federal Savings Bank. and resided in Hamilton Township, Mercer County, New Jersey.

Inverso ran again for his old State Senate seat again in 2013 for the 14th Legislative District but lost to incumbent Sen. Linda R. Greenstein.
