= Walter E. Foran =

American politician

Member of the New Jersey Senate
- In office November 21, 1977 – December 8, 1986
- Preceded by: Anne Clark Martindell
- Succeeded by: Dick Zimmer
- Constituency: 14th district (1977–1982); 23rd district (1982–1986)

Member of the New Jersey General Assembly
- In office January 13, 1970 – November 21, 1977
- Preceded by: Douglas E. Gimson
- Succeeded by: Barbara McConnell
- Constituency: 15th district (1970–1972); 6A district (1972–1974); 14th district (1974–1977)

Personal details
- Born: May 14, 1919 Flemington, New Jersey, U.S.
- Died: December 8, 1986 (aged 67) Raritan Township, New Jersey, U.S.
- Party: Republican

Walter Edge "Moose" Foran (May 14, 1919 – December 8, 1986) was an American Republican Party politician from New Jersey, who served in both houses of the New Jersey Legislature. He followed in the footsteps of his father, Arthur F. Foran, who served in the New Jersey Senate.

== Biography ==
Foran was born in Flemington, the fourth of five sons to Elizabeth and Arthur F. Foran. His eldest sibling, Dick Foran, would go on to be a B-movie actor. Walter Edge Foran was named in honor of Walter Evans Edge, his father's political mentor. Arthur F. Foran had already served as Mayor of Flemington before working as an aide to Edge, then Governor of New Jersey, in 1917. By the time of Walter Foran's birth in May 1919, Edge had been elected to the United States Senate.

After graduating from Staunton Military Academy in Virginia, Foran attended the University of North Carolina at Chapel Hill. He served in the Army field artillery in World War II.

Foran served as the Hunterdon County Republican Chairman from 1961 to 1970. He was elected to the New Jersey State Assembly in 1969 and served as a member of the Joint Appropriations Committee, eventually becoming Minority Leader. He was elected to the New Jersey Senate in 1977, taking the seat of Anne Clark Martindell, a Democrat who resigned to serve in a series of positions in the Carter administration including United States Ambassador to New Zealand. He won a special election to fill the remainder of Martindell's term as well as the general election for a full four-year term in the 14th legislative district. After redistricting, he was re-elected to the Senate in 1981 and 1983 representing the 23rd district.

Foran was considered an "old school statesman" and "an imposing figure" (hence the nickname "Moose"), who had "a congenial and persuasive manner and a quick mind." In the Senate Foran was the ranking Republican on the Revenue, Finance and Appropriations Committee. After his death, a special election to fill his seat was won by Dick Zimmer, then serving in the Assembly.

On the Cook College campus of Rutgers University, Walter E. Foran Hall was dedicated on October 30, 1995. It is a 154,000-square-foot (14,300 m^{2}) complex housing the Biotechnology Center for Agriculture and the Environment, the Department of Plant Biology and Pathology, and the Chang Science Library. Foran was an early champion of agricultural biotechnology and was instrumental in the founding of the center.

A resident of Flemington, Foran died of lung cancer at Hunterdon Medical Center at the age of 67 on December 8, 1986.

New Jersey General Assembly
Preceded by Douglas E. Gimson	Member of the New Jersey General Assembly from the 15th district January 13, 1970–January 11, 1972	Succeeded by Walter C. Keogh-Dwyer
Preceded by William E. Schluter	Member of the New Jersey General Assembly from the 6A district January 11, 1972–January 8, 1974	Succeeded by Constituency abolished
Preceded by Constituency established	Member of the New Jersey General Assembly from the 14th district January 8, 1974–November 21, 1977	Succeeded by Barbara McConnell
New Jersey Senate
Preceded by Anne Clark Martindell	Member of the New Jersey Senate from the 14th district November 21, 1977–January 12, 1982	Succeeded by Francis J. McManimon
Preceded by John H. Dorsey	Member of the New Jersey Senate from the 23rd district January 12, 1982–December 8, 1986	Succeeded by Dick Zimmer
