= Barbara McConnell =

American politician

Member of the New Jersey General Assembly from the 14th district
- In office January 10, 1978 – January 12, 1982 Serving with Karl Weidel
- Preceded by: Walter E. Foran
- Succeeded by: Joseph L. Bocchini Jr. Joseph D. Patero

Personal details
- Born: Barbara Wright McConnell; October 5, 1936 Nashville, Tennessee, U.S.
- Died: October 21, 2016 (aged 80) Raritan Township, New Jersey, U.S.
- Party: Democratic
- Spouse: Terry McConnell
- Education: Tennessee Polytechnic Institute (BS)

Barbara Wright McConnell (October 5, 1936 – October 21, 2016) was an American Democratic Party politician from New Jersey, who served in the New Jersey General Assembly from 1978 to 1982 and in the cabinet of former Governor James Florio.

== Biography ==
McConnell was born Barbara Wright, daughter of Carson and Mildred Wright, in Nashville, Tennessee. She grew up in Livingston, Tennessee, graduating from Livingston Academy. In 1955, she was selected Miss Putnam County and competed in the Miss Tennessee pageant. She earned a B.S. degree in 1957 from Tennessee Polytechnic Institute (now Tennessee Technological University). After graduating from college, she married Terry McConnell, who worked for the United States Patent and Trademark Office.

After moving with her husband to Washington, D.C., McConnell worked for U.S. Rep. Joe L. Evins, first as a secretary and then as an administrative assistant. When her husband accepted an offer to work with a bank in New Jersey, they moved to Delaware Township outside Flemington, New Jersey. McConnell became active in the local Democratic Party organization, and in 1977 she was elected to the New Jersey General Assembly in a district usually dominated by Republicans. While serving in the Assembly, McConnell worked on legislation to combat discrimination against women by lending institutions, as well as legislation helping to protect women against domestic violence. She served as president of the board of the Hunterdon County volunteer organization Women's Crisis Services, now known as SAFE in Hunterdon.

In 1981, McConnell gave up her seat in the Assembly to run in the Democratic primary for Governor of New Jersey. In a crowded race, she finished with only 3% of the vote, well behind the front-runner James Florio. Florio lost in the general election to Thomas Kean but later served a term as governor from 1990 to 1994. After her defeat in the gubernatorial race, McConnell served as president of the New Jersey Food Council, a lobbying group representing the food industry. She returned to public service ten years later in the Florio administration, when she was appointed as New Jersey Commissioner of Commerce and Economic Development. She was the first woman to serve in this position.

Following the end of Governor Florio's term of office in January 1994, McConnell again worked as a lobbyist, establishing the McConnell Group to represent the interests of several large companies and organizations, including Coca-Cola Bottling Co. She continued to reside in Delaware Township.

She died following hip surgery on October 21, 2016, in Raritan Township, New Jersey at age 80.
