= Joseph D. Patero =

American politician (1932–2020)

Member of the New Jersey General Assembly from the 14th Legislative District
- In office January 12, 1988 – August 22, 1991 Serving with Anthony J. Cimino
- Preceded by: Joseph L. Bocchini Jr. John K. Rafferty
- Succeeded by: Peter A. Cantu
- Constituency: 14th district
- In office January 8, 1974 – January 14, 1986 Serving with Joseph L. Bocchini Jr.
- Preceded by: District created
- Succeeded by: John K. Rafferty
- Constituency: 17th district (1974–1982); 14th district (1982–1986)

Personal details
- Born: March 30, 1932 Manville, New Jersey
- Died: June 20, 2020 (aged 88) Manville, New Jersey
- Party: Democratic

Joseph D. Patero (March 30, 1932 – June 20, 2020) was an American politician who served in the New Jersey General Assembly from 1974 to 1986 and from 1988 to 1991. During the majority of his tenure in the Assembly, he served as chair of the Assembly's Labor Committee.

Born and raised in Manville, Patero attended Bound Brook High School and Rutgers University.

Patero served in the United States Army during the Korean War. He also served in the volunteer fire department and on the Manville Board of Health. He died at his home in Manville on June 20, 2020, at age 88.

New Jersey General Assembly
Preceded by District created	Member of the New Jersey General Assembly from the 17th district January 8, 1974–January 12, 1982; Served alongside: William J. Hamilton, David C. Schwartz	Succeeded by Angela L. Perun
Preceded by Barbara McConnell	Member of the New Jersey General Assembly from the 14th district January 12, 1982–January 14, 1986; Served alongside: Joseph L. Bocchini Jr.	Succeeded by John K. Rafferty
Preceded by John K. Rafferty	Member of the New Jersey General Assembly from the 14th district January 12, 1988– August 22, 1991; Served alongside: Anthony J. Cimino	Succeeded by Peter A. Cantu
