= 1990 United States House of Representatives elections in New Jersey =

- November 6, 1990

All 14 New Jersey seats to the United States House of Representatives
- Turnout: 54% (▼23pp)
	Majority party	Minority party
Party	Democratic	Republican
Last election	8	6
Seats won	8	6
Seat change	Steady	Steady
Popular vote	836,944	910,931
Percentage	45.8%	49.9%
Swing	▼2.3	▼1.0

Democratic
40–50%
50–60%
60–70%
70–80%
80–90%
90–100%
Republican
50–60%
60–70%
70–80%

The 1990 United States House of Representatives elections in New Jersey were held on November 6, 1990, to determine who would represent the people of New Jersey in the United States House of Representatives. This election coincided with national elections for U.S. House and U.S. Senate. New Jersey had fourteen seats in the House, apportioned according to the 1980 United States census. Representatives are elected for two-year terms.

Despite widespread discontent and anger over tax increases at the state and federal level, all ten incumbent candidates won their races, and the two open seats remained with their respective parties.

== Overview ==
1990 United States House of Representatives elections in New Jersey
Party	Votes	Percentage	Candidates	Seats	+/–
Democratic	836,944	45.82%	14	8	Steady
Republican	910,931	49.87%	12	6	Steady
Populist	36,156	1.98%	12	0	Steady
Libertarian	7,385	0.40%	4	0	Steady
Socialist Workers	1,961	0.11%	2	0	Steady
Independents	33,147	1.81%	9	0	Steady
Totals	1,826,524	100.00%	53	14	Steady

== District 1 ==
1990 New Jersey's 1st congressional district election
- November 6, 1990
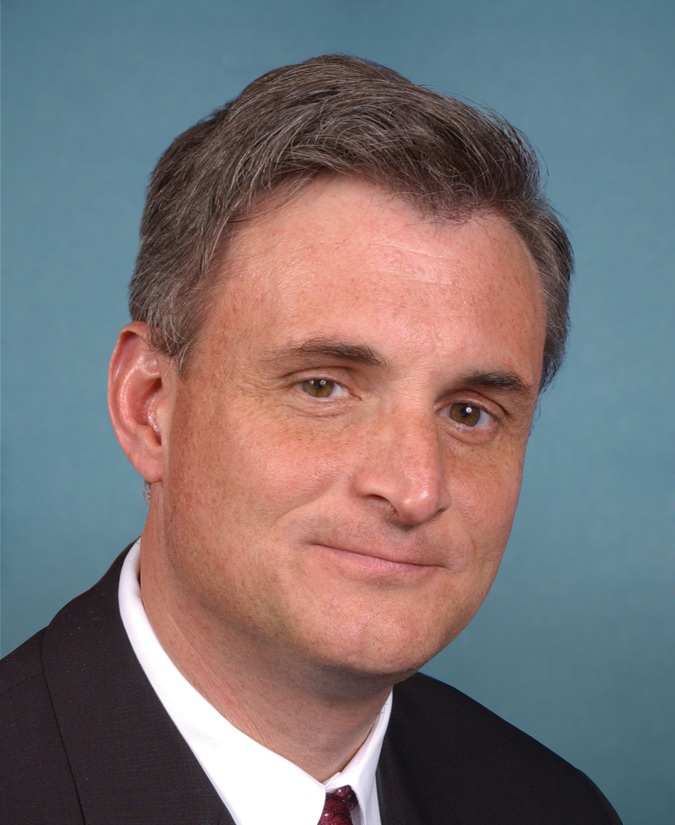

Nominee	Rob Andrews	Daniel Mangini
Party	Democratic	Republican
Popular vote	72,415	57,299
Percentage	54.1%	42.8%
U.S. Representative before election
Vacant
Elected U.S. Representative
Rob Andrews
Democratic

This seat had been vacant since January 16, 1990, when James Florio resigned to take office as Governor of New Jersey. Democrat Rob Andrews won the open race, as well as the simultaneous election to complete Florio's unexpired term. The district included parts of Burlington, Camden, and Gloucester counties.

=== Democratic primary ===
==== Candidates ====
- Rob Andrews, Camden County Freeholder
- Linda Bowker, head of the New Jersey chapter of the National Organization for Women
- John A. Dramesi, retired Air Force colonel and former prison of war
- Joel S. Farley, attorney

==== Results ====
1990 Democratic primary
Party	Candidate	Votes	%
Democratic	Rob Andrews	14,589	52.65%
Democratic	Linda Bowker	8,290	29.92%
Democratic	John A. Dramesi	3,922	14.15%
Democratic	Joel S. Farley	908	3.28%
Total votes		27,709	100.00%

==== Special primary results ====
1990 Democratic primary
Party	Candidate	Votes	%
Democratic	Rob Andrews	15,786	62.64%
Democratic	Linda Bowker	9,415	37.36%
Total votes		25,201	100.00%

=== Republican primary ===
==== Candidates ====
- Daniel Mangini, Gloucester County Freeholder

==== Results ====
1990 Republican primary
Party	Candidate	Votes	%
Republican	Daniel Mangini	7,463	100.00%
Total votes		7,463	100.00%

==== Special primary results ====
1990 Republican primary
Party	Candidate	Votes	%
Republican	Daniel Mangini	7,121	100.00%
Total votes		7,121	100.00%

=== General election ===
==== Candidates ====
- Rob Andrews, Camden County Freeholder (Democratic)
- William Henry Harris (Populist)
- Walter E. Konstanty (Pride and Honesty)
- Daniel Mangini, Gloucester County Freeholder (Republican)
- Jerry Zeldin (Libertarian)

==== Campaign ====
Mangini attacked Andrews as a "clone" of his predecessor Florio, the unpopular governor and former Representative. Despite his ties to Florio, even many Republicans conceded that Andrews was the likely favorite to hold the seat, which was heavily Democratic. Mangini ran on a consistent anti-tax theme.

==== Results ====
1990 U.S. House election
Party	Candidate	Votes	%	±%
Democratic	Rob Andrews	72,415	54.12%	▼15.77
Republican	Daniel Mangini	57,299	42.83%	▲13.28
Libertarian	Jerry Zeldin	1,592	1.19%	▲0.64
Independent	Walter A. Konstanty	1,422	1.06%	N/A
Populist	William Henry Harris	1,066	0.80%	N/A
Total votes		133,794	100.00%	
Democratic hold		Swing	{{{swing}}}	

== District 2 ==
1990 New Jersey's 2nd congressional district election
- November 6, 1990
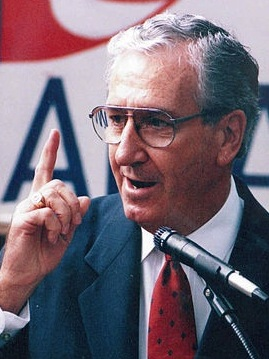

Nominee	William J. Hughes	William Kanengiser
Party	Democratic	Populist
Popular vote	97,968	13,120
Percentage	88.2%	11.8%
U.S. Representative before election
William J. Hughes
Democratic
Elected U.S. Representative
William J. Hughes
Democratic

Incumbent William J. Hughes won with no Republican opponent. This district, the largest in South Jersey, included all of Atlantic, Cape May, Cumberland, and Salem counties and parts of Gloucester County.

=== Democratic primary ===
==== Candidates ====
- William J. Hughes, incumbent Representative since 1975

==== Results ====
1990 Democratic primary
Party	Candidate	Votes	%
Democratic	William J. Hughes (incumbent)	12,181	100.00%
Total votes		12,181	100.00%

=== General election ===
==== Candidates ====
- William J. Hughes, incumbent Representative since 1975 (Democratic)
- William A. Kanengiser (Populist)

==== Results ====
1990 U.S. House election
Party	Candidate	Votes	%	±%
Democratic	William J. Hughes (incumbent)	97,598	88.16%	▲23.57
Populist	William A. Kanengiser	13,120	11.84%	N/A
Total votes		110,818	100.00%	
Democratic hold		Swing	{{{swing}}}	

== District 3 ==
1990 New Jersey's 3rd congressional district election
- November 6, 1990
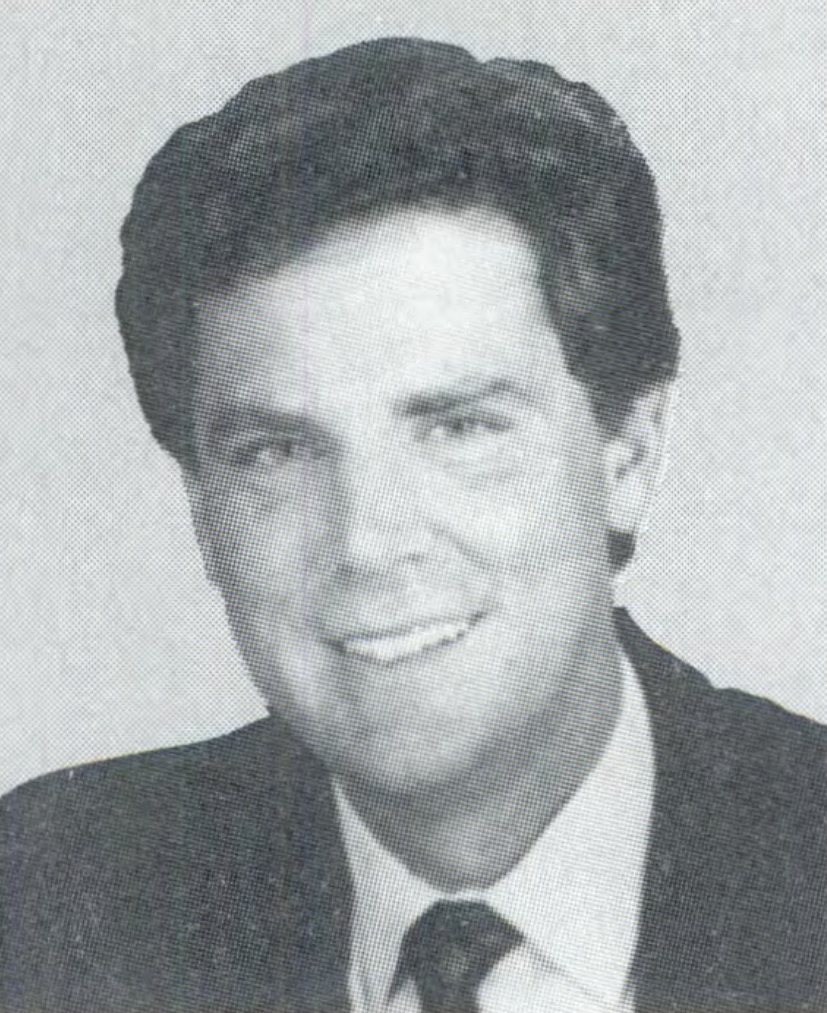

Nominee	Frank Pallone	Paul Kapalko
Party	Democratic	Republican
Popular vote	77,866	73,696
Percentage	49.1%	46.5%
U.S. Representative before election
Frank Pallone
Democratic
Elected U.S. Representative
Frank Pallone
Democratic

Incumbent Democrat Frank Pallone won. This district included parts of Monmouth and Ocean counties.

=== Democratic primary ===
==== Candidates ====
- Pat Daly
- Frank Pallone, incumbent Representative from Long Branch since 1988
- Irwin Zucker

==== Results ====
1990 Democratic primary
Party	Candidate	Votes	%
Democratic	Frank Pallone (incumbent)	12,544	80.36%
Democratic	Pat Daly	2,555	16.37%
Democratic	Irwin Zucker	551	3.53%
Total votes		15,610	100.00%

=== Republican primary ===
==== Candidates ====
- Paul A. Kapalko, former assemblyman and member of the Asbury Park City Council

==== Results ====
1990 Republican primary
Party	Candidate	Votes	%
Republican	Paul A. Kapalko	10,870	100.00%
Total votes		10,870	100.00%

=== General election ===
==== Candidates ====
- Paul A. Kapalko, former assemblyman and member of the Asbury Park City Council (Republican)
- Richard D. McKean (Independent)
- Frank Pallone, incumbent Representative from Long Branch since 1988 (Democratic)
- Joseph A. Plonski (Populist)
- William Stewart (Libertarian)

==== Campaign ====
Kapalko sought to tie Pallone to the unpopular incumbent governor, Jim Florio, and his $2.8 billion state tax increase. After Pallone's campaign manager, Joel Berg, admitted to The New York Times that they sought to "airbrush Florio out of the picture," Pallone stated, "There is no question that I have never done anything but support Democratic candidates. I work very hard every November for Democrats, whether it be the Governor or whatever. There is no question I supported him, but Kapalko is trying to make me his campaign manager, which is not the case." Pallone, who had a moderate reputation as an opponent of spending increases in Congress, the New Jersey Senate, and the Monmouth County Board of Chosen Freeholders, was urged by aides to come out directly against the tax increase.

At a candidates' forum in Ocean Township on November 3, protestors carried signs denouncing the Florio tax package. During the forum, Kapalko and independent candidate Richard D. McKean, running on an anti-abortion platform, both criticized Pallone for distancing himself from Florio after serving as chair of his campaign and, in an interview with the Asbury Park Press editorial board, questioning whether he had ever served in that role at all. Despite these attacks, Pallone was widely seen to be leading as the campaign entered its closing days.

==== Results ====
1990 U.S. House election
Party	Candidate	Votes	%	±%
Democratic	Frank Pallone Jr. (incumbent)	77,866	49.08%	▼2.56
Republican	Paul A. Kapalko	73,696	46.45%	▼0.98
Independent	Richard D. McKean	4,377	2.76%	N/A
Libertarian	Bill Stewart	1,833	1.16%	▲0.23
Populist	Joseph A. Plonski	871	0.55%	N/A
Total votes		158,643	100.00%	
Democratic hold		Swing	{{{swing}}}	

== District 4 ==
1990 New Jersey's 4th congressional district election
- November 6, 1990
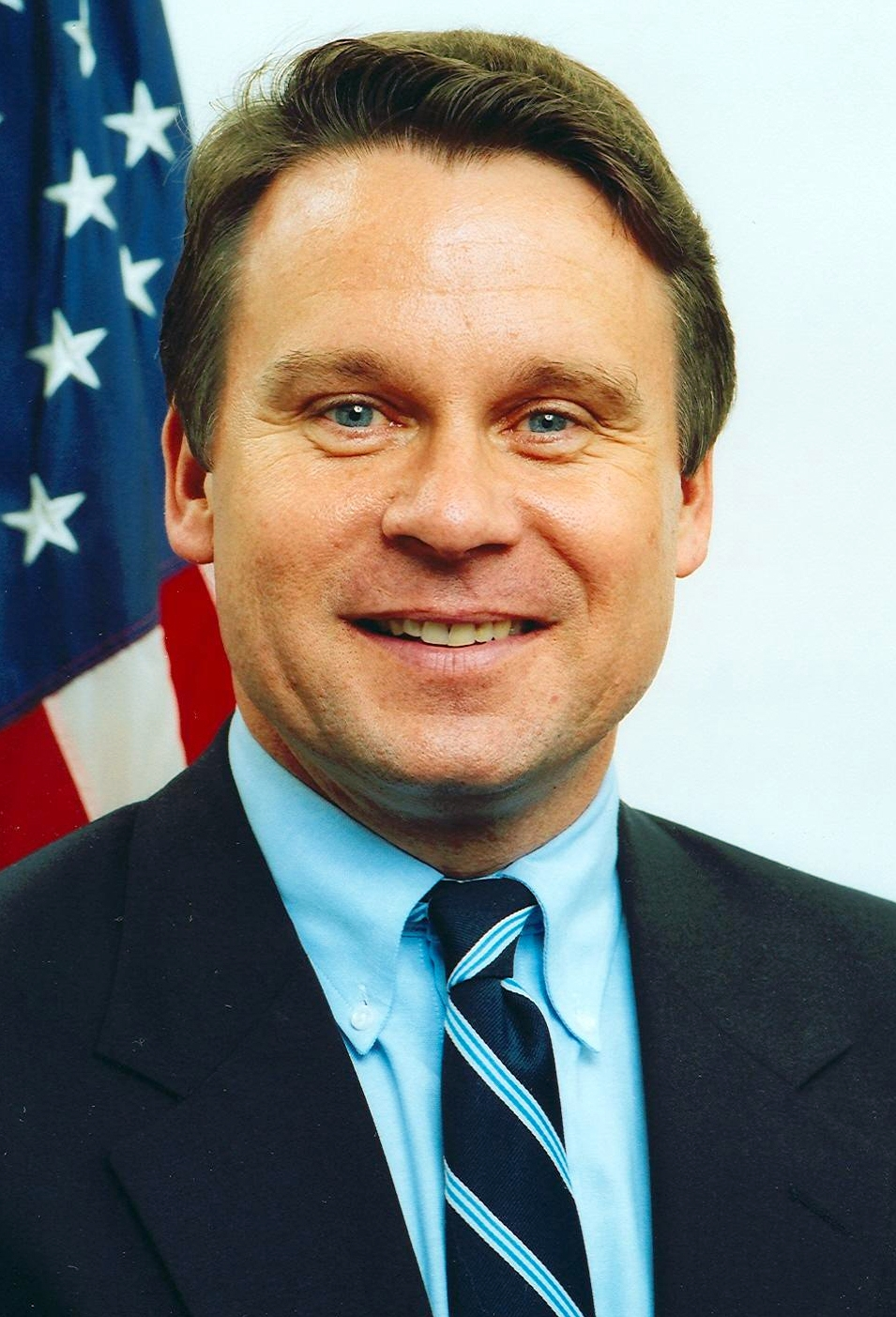

Nominee	Chris Smith	Mark Setaro
Party	Republican	Democratic
Popular vote	99,920	54,961
Percentage	62.7%	34.5%
U.S. Representative before election
Chris Smith
Republican
Elected U.S. Representative
Chris Smith
Republican

Incumbent Republican Chris Smith won. This district, in Central Jersey, consisted of parts of Burlington, Mercer, Middlesex, Monmouth and Ocean counties.

=== Republican primary ===
==== Candidates ====
- Chris Smith, incumbent Representative since 1981

==== Results ====
1990 Republican primary
Party	Candidate	Votes	%
Republican	Chris Smith (incumbent)	10,704	100.00%
Total votes		10,704	100.00%

=== Democratic primary ===
==== Candidates ====
- Mark Setaro, Trenton lawyer

==== Results ====
1990 Democratic primary
Party	Candidate	Votes	%
Democratic	Mark Setaro	11,394	100.00%
Total votes		11,394	100.00%

=== General election ===
==== Candidates ====
- Judson M. Carter, independent candidate for this district in 1988 (God We Trust)
- Joseph J. Notarangelo (Populist)
- Carl Peters (Libertarian)
- Mark Setaro, Trenton lawyer (Democratic)
- Chris Smith, incumbent Representative since 1981 (Republican)

==== Results ====
1990 U.S. House election
Party	Candidate	Votes	%	±%
Republican	Chris Smith (incumbent)	99,920	62.72%	▼3.02
Democratic	Mark Setaro	54,961	34.50%	▲1.05
Libertarian	Carl Peters	2,178	1.37%	▲1.04
Populist	Joseph J. Notarangelo	1,206	0.76%	N/A
Independent	Judson M. Carter	1,034	0.65%	▲0.18
Total votes		159,299	100.00%	
Republican hold		Swing	{{{swing}}}	

== District 5 ==
1990 New Jersey's 5th congressional district election
- November 6, 1990
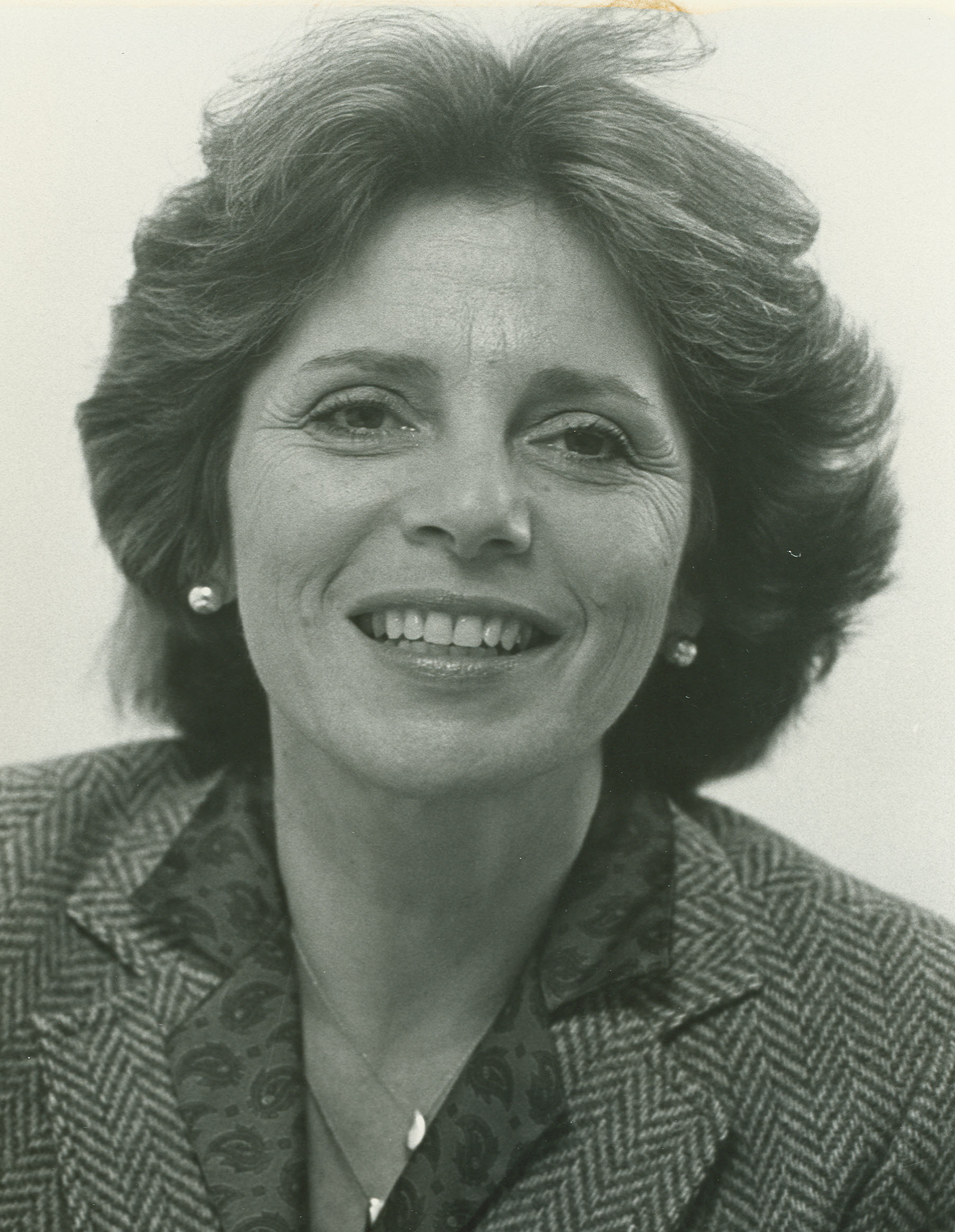

Nominee	Marge Roukema	Lawrence W. Olsen
Party	Republican	Democratic
Popular vote	118,101	35,010
Percentage	75.7%	22.4%
U.S. Representative before election
Marge Roukema
Republican
Elected U.S. Representative
Marge Roukema
Republican

Incumbent Marge Roukema won. This district included parts of Bergen, Passaic, and Sussex counties.

=== Republican primary ===
==== Candidates ====
- Marge Roukema, incumbent Representative from Ridgewood since 1981

==== Results ====
1990 Republican primary
Party	Candidate	Votes	%
Republican	Marge Roukema (incumbent)	16,222	100.00%
Total votes		16,222	100.00%

=== Democratic primary ===
==== Candidates ====
- Elliot Greenspan
- Lawrence Wayne Olsen, Paramus schoolteacher

==== Results ====
1990 Democratic primary
Party	Candidate	Votes	%
Democratic	Lawrence Wayne Olsen	6,317	93.92%
Democratic	Elliot Greenspan	409	6.08%
Total votes		6,726	100.00%

=== General election ===
==== Candidates ====
- Lawrence Wayne Olsen, Paramus schoolteacher (Democratic)
- Mark Richards (Populist)
- Marge Roukema, incumbent Representative from Ridgewood since 1981 (Republican)

==== Results ====
1990 U.S. House election
Party	Candidate	Votes	%	±%
Republican	Marge Roukema (incumbent)	118,101	75.65%	▼0.04
Democratic	Lawrence Wayne Olsen	35,010	22.43%	▼1.21
Populist	Mark Richards	2,998	1.92%	N/A
Total votes		156,109	100.00%	
Republican hold		Swing	{{{swing}}}	

== District 6 ==
1990 New Jersey's 6th congressional district election
- November 6, 1990
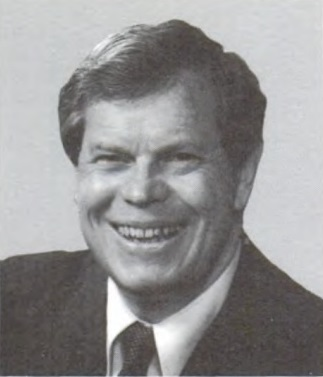

Nominee	Bernard J. Dwyer	Paul Danielczyk
Party	Democratic	Republican
Popular vote	63,745	58,147
Percentage	50.6%	46.1%
U.S. Representative before election
Bernard J. Dwyer
Democratic
Elected U.S. Representative
Bernard J. Dwyer
Democratic

Incumbent Democrat Bernard J. Dwyer won. This district included parts of Middlesex, Monmouth and Union counties.

=== Democratic primary ===
==== Candidates ====
- Sebastian Del Duca
- Bernard J. Dwyer, incumbent Representative from Edison since 1981

==== Results ====
1990 Democratic primary
Party	Candidate	Votes	%
Democratic	Bernard J. Dwyer (incumbent)	22,440	88.23%
Democratic	Sebastian Del Duca	2,994	11.77%
Total votes		25,434	100.00%

=== Republican primary ===
==== Candidates ====
- Paul Danielczyk, Woodbridge realtor
- Rodger Zepka

==== Results ====
1990 Republican primary
Party	Candidate	Votes	%
Republican	Paul Danielczyk	3,893	80.89%
Republican	Rodger Zepka	920	19.11%
Total votes		4,813	100.00%

=== General election ===
==== Candidates ====
- Paul Danielczyk, Woodbridge realtor (Republican)
- Bernard J. Dwyer, incumbent Representative from Edison since 1981 (Democratic)
- Howard F. Schoen (Libertarian)
- Randolph Waller (Populist)

==== Results ====
1990 U.S. House election
Party	Candidate	Votes	%	±%
Democratic	Bernard J. Dwyer (incumbent)	63,745	50.58%	▼10.52
Republican	Paul Danielczyk	58,147	46.14%	▲8.08
Populist	Randolph Waller	2,348	1.86%	N/A
Libertarian	Howard F. Schoen	1,782	1.41%	▲1.10
Total votes		126,022	100.00%	
Democratic hold		Swing	{{{swing}}}	

== District 7 ==
1990 New Jersey's 7th congressional district election
- November 6, 1990
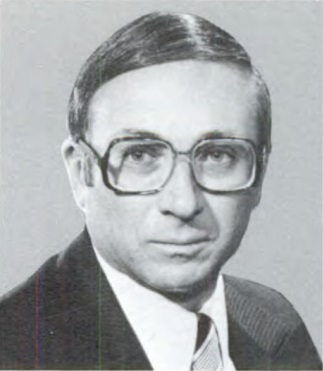

Nominee	Matt Rinaldo	Bruce Bergen
Party	Republican	Democratic
Popular vote	100,066	31,099
Percentage	74.6%	23.2%
U.S. Representative before election
Matt Rinaldo
Republican
Elected U.S. Representative
Matt Rinaldo
Republican

Incumbent Matt Rinaldo won. This district included parts of Essex, Middlesex, Somerset, and Union counties.

=== Republican primary ===
==== Candidates ====
- Matt Rinaldo, incumbent Representative from Union since 1973

==== Results ====
1990 Republican primary
Party	Candidate	Votes	%
Republican	Matt Rinaldo (incumbent)	11,794	100.00%
Total votes		11,794	100.00%

=== Democratic primary ===
==== Candidates ====
- Bruce H. Bergen, lawyer

==== Results ====
1990 Democratic primary
Party	Candidate	Votes	%
Democratic	Bruce H. Bergen	9,867	100.00%
Total votes		9,867	100.00%

=== General election ===
==== Candidates ====
- Bruce H. Bergen, lawyer (Democratic)
- Matt Rinaldo, incumbent Representative from Union since 1973 (Republican)
- Thomas V. Sarnowski (Populist)

==== Results ====
1990 U.S. House election
Party	Candidate	Votes	%	±%
Republican	Matt Rinaldo (incumbent)	100,066	74.64%	▲0.03
Democratic	Bruce H. Bergen	31,099	23.20%	▼2.19
Populist	Thomas V. Sarnowski	2,907	2.17%	N/A
Total votes		134,072	100.00%	
Republican hold		Swing	{{{swing}}}	

== District 8 ==
1990 New Jersey's 8th congressional district election
- November 6, 1990
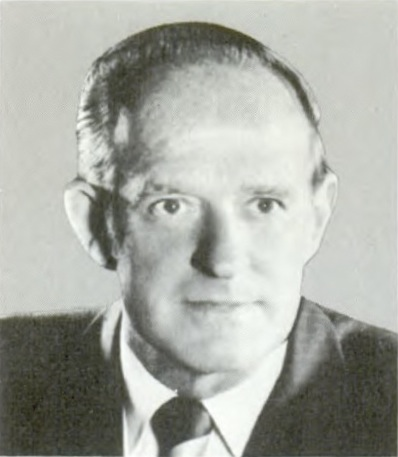

Nominee	Robert A. Roe	Stephen Sibilia
Party	Democratic	Independent
Popular vote	55,797	13,180
Percentage	76.9%	18.2%
U.S. Representative before election
Robert A. Roe
Democratic
Elected U.S. Representative
Robert A. Roe
Democratic

Incumbent Robert Roe won. This district included parts of Bergen, Essex, Morris and Passaic counties.

=== Democratic primary ===
==== Candidates ====
- Edward S. Hochman
- Robert A. Roe, incumbent Representative from Wayne since 1969

==== Results ====
1990 Democratic primary
Party	Candidate	Votes	%
Democratic	Robert A. Roe (incumbent)	11,559	79.64%
Democratic	Edward S. Hochman	2,955	20.36%
Total votes		14,514	100.00%

=== General election ===
==== Candidates ====
- Bruce Eden (Populist)
- Robert A. Roe, incumbent Representative from Wayne since 1969 (Democratic)
- Stephen Sibilia (Independent Conservative)

==== Results ====
1990 U.S. House election
Party	Candidate	Votes	%	±%
Democratic	Robert A. Roe	55,797	76.92%	▼23.08
Independent	Stephen Sibilia	13,180	18.17%	N/A
Populist	Bruce Eden	3,563	4.91%	N/A
Total votes		72,540	100.00%	
Democratic hold		Swing	{{{swing}}}	

== District 9 ==
1990 New Jersey's 9th congressional district election
- November 6, 1990
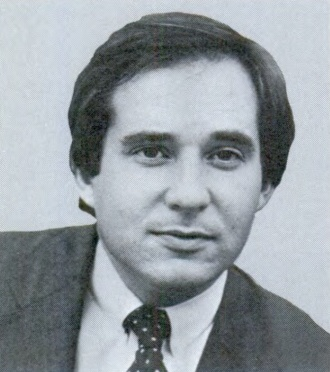

Nominee	Bob Torricelli	Peter J. Russo
Party	Democratic	Republican
Popular vote	82,535	69,658
Percentage	53.3%	45.0%
U.S. Representative before election
Bob Torricelli
Democratic
Elected U.S. Representative
Bob Torricelli
Democratic

Incumbent Democrat Bob Torricelli won. This district consisted of parts of Bergen and Hudson counties.

=== Democratic primary ===
==== Candidates ====
- Bob Torricelli, incumbent Representative from Englewood since 1983
- Robert Wesser

==== Results ====
1990 Democratic primary
Party	Candidate	Votes	%
Democratic	Robert G. Torricelli (incumbent)	12,734	96.32%
Democratic	Robert Wesser	486	3.68%
Total votes		13,220	100.00%

=== Republican primary ===
==== Candidates ====
- Peter J. Russo, former assemblyman from Lyndhurst

==== Results ====
1990 Republican primary
Party	Candidate	Votes	%
Republican	Peter J. Russo	5,715	100.00%
Total votes		5,715	100.00%

=== General election ===
==== Candidates ====
- Chester Grabowski (Populist)
- Peter J. Russo, former assemblyman from Lyndhurst (Republican)
- Bob Torricelli, incumbent Representative from Englewood since 1983 (Democratic)

==== Results ====
1990 U.S. House election
Party	Candidate	Votes	%	±%
Democratic	Bob Torricelli (incumbent)	82,535	53.33%	▼13.82
Republican	Peter J. Russo	69,658	45.01%	▲12.69
Populist	Chester Grabowski	2,573	1.66%	N/A
Total votes		154,766	100.00%	
Democratic hold		Swing	{{{swing}}}	

== District 10 ==
1990 New Jersey's 10th congressional district election
- November 6, 1990
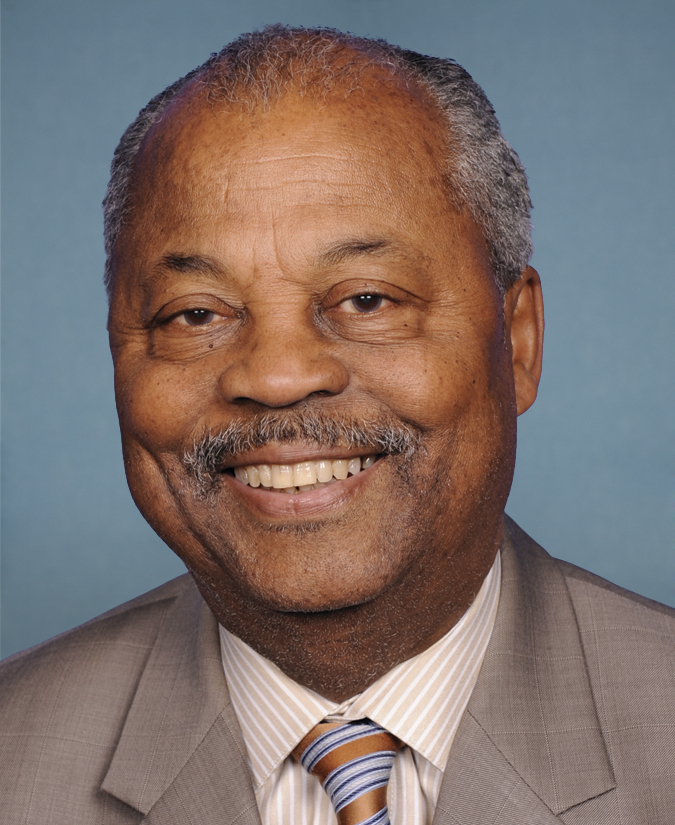

Nominee	Donald M. Payne	Howard Berkeley
Party	Democratic	Republican
Popular vote	42,106	8,954
Percentage	81.4%	17.3%
U.S. Representative before election
Donald M. Payne
Democratic
Elected U.S. Representative
Donald M. Payne
Democratic

Incumbent Democrat Donald M. Payne won. The district included parts of Essex and Union counties.

=== Democratic primary ===
==== Candidates ====
- Donald M. Payne, incumbent Representative from Newark since 1989

==== Results ====
1990 Democratic primary
Party	Candidate	Votes	%
Democratic	Donald M. Payne (incumbent)	16,437	100.00%
Total votes		16,437	100.00%

=== Republican primary ===
==== Candidates ====
- Howard E. Berkeley

==== Results ====
1990 Republican primary
Party	Candidate	Votes	%
Republican	Howard E. Berkeley	1,224	100.00%
Total votes		1,224	100.00%

=== General election ===
==== Candidates ====
- Howard E. Berkeley (Republican)
- George Mehrabian (Socialist Workers)
- Donald M. Payne, incumbent Representative from Newark since 1989 (Democratic)

==== Results ====
1990 U.S. House election
Party	Candidate	Votes	%	±%
Democratic	Donald M. Payne (incumbent)	42,106	81.44%	▲4.09
Republican	Howard E. Berkeley	8,954	17.32%	▲4.67
Socialist Workers	George Mehrabian	643	1.24%	▼2.91
Total votes		51,703	100.00%	
Democratic hold		Swing	{{{swing}}}	

== District 11 ==
1990 New Jersey's 11th congressional district election
- November 6, 1990
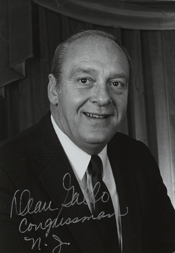

Nominee	Dean Gallo	Michael Gordon
Party	Republican	Democratic
Popular vote	92,681	47,414
Percentage	64.5%	33.0%
U.S. Representative before election
Dean Gallo
Republican
Elected U.S. Representative
Dean Gallo
Republican

Incumbent Republican Dean Gallo won. This district consisted of parts of Essex, Morris, Sussex and Warren counties.

=== Republican primary ===
==== Candidates ====
- Dean Gallo, incumbent Representative since 1985

==== Results ====
1990 Republican primary
Party	Candidate	Votes	%
Republican	Dean Gallo (incumbent)	16,829	100.00%
Total votes		16,829	100.00%

=== Democratic primary ===
==== Candidates ====
- Mary Frueholz
- Michael Gordon, West Orange environmental lawyer

==== Results ====
1990 Democratic primary
Party	Candidate	Votes	%
Democratic	Michael Gordon	7,587	86.73%
Democratic	Mary Frueholz	1,161	13.27%
Total votes		8,748	100.00%

=== General election ===
==== Candidates ====
- Dean Gallo, incumbent Representative since 1985 (Republican)
- Michael Gordon, West Orange environmental lawyer (Democratic)
- Jasper Gould (Populist)

==== Results ====
1990 U.S. House election
Party	Candidate	Votes	%	±%
Republican	Dean Gallo (incumbent)	92,681	64.50%	▼5.98
Democratic	Michael Gordon	47,414	33.00%	▲2.48
Populist	Jasper Gould	3,591	2.50%	N/A
Total votes		143,686	100.00%	
Republican hold		Swing	{{{swing}}}	

== District 12 ==
1990 New Jersey's 12th congressional district election
- November 6, 1990
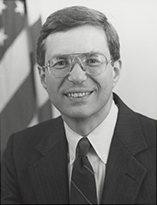

Nominee	Dick Zimmer	Marguerite Chandler
Party	Republican	Democratic
Popular vote	107,851	52,256
Percentage	64.0%	31.0%
U.S. Representative before election
Jim Courter
Republican
Elected U.S. Representative
Dick Zimmer
Republican

Incumbent Republican Jim Courter did not run after losing the 1989 gubernatorial election; Dick Zimmer won the open seat. This sprawling district included all of Hunterdon County and parts of Mercer, Middlesex, Morris, Somerset, Sussex, and Warren counties.

=== Republican primary ===
==== Candidates ====
- Rodney Frelinghuysen, assemblyman from Morristown, son of former Representative Peter Frelinghuysen, and candidate for this district in 1982
- Phil McConkey, former U.S. Navy helicopter pilot and American football wide receiver for the New York Giants
- Joseph F. Shanahan, perennial candidate
- Dick Zimmer, state senator from Flemington

===== Declined =====
- Roger Bodman, former New Jersey Commissioner of Labor and Commissioner of Transportation
- Leanna Brown, state senator from Chatham
- Jim Courter, incumbent Representative since 1983 and Republican nominee for governor in 1989
- Walter Kavanaugh, assemblyman from Somerville
- Peter Mancuso, former mayor of Morris Township
- Nicholas Platt, vice president of the New York Stock Exchange
- Jack Sinagra, mayor of East Brunswick
- Christine Todd Whitman, chair of the New Jersey Board of Public Utilities (ran for U.S. Senate)

==== Campaign ====
Frelinghuysen, who had unsuccessfully run against Courter for this seat in a 1982 open primary, was the early favorite for the nomination. He won the crucial support of the Morris and Somerset Republican organizations, which accounted for about half of the anticipated primary vote.

==== Endorsements ====
Rodney Frelinghuysen

U.S. representatives

- Millicent Fenwick, former U.S. representative from Bernardsville

State legislators

- Raymond Bateman, former state senator from Branchburg and Republican nominee for governor in 1977
- John H. Dorsey, state senator from Boonton
- John S. Penn, assemblyman from Far Hills and chair of the Somerset County Republican Party

Political parties

- Morris County Republican Party
- Somerset County Republican Party
Phil McConkey

Federal executive branch officials

- Jack Kemp, former U.S. Secretary of Housing and Urban Development, U.S. representative from Buffalo, New York, quarterback for the Buffalo Bills and candidate for president in 1988

Individuals

- Roger Stone, Republican campaign strategist (member of campaign staff)
Dick Zimmer

Political parties

- Hunterdon County Republican Party
- Mercer County Republican Party
- Middlesex County Republican Party

==== Results ====
1990 Republican primary
Party	Candidate	Votes	%
Republican	Dick Zimmer	15,834	37.70%
Republican	Phil McConkey	12,925	30.77%
Republican	Rodney Frelinghuysen	12,257	29.18%
Republican	Joseph F. Shanahan	989	2.35%
Total votes		42,005	100.00%

=== Democratic primary ===
==== Candidates ====
- Marguerite Chandler, Somerville businesswoman
- James J. Cleary, supporter of Lyndon LaRouche

==== Results ====
1990 Democratic primary
Party	Candidate	Votes	%
Democratic	Marguerite Chandler	12,058	92.19%
Democratic	James J. Cleary	1,021	7.81%
Total votes		13,079	100.00%

=== General election ===
==== Candidates ====
- John I. Bottcher ("Back to Basics")
- Marguerite Chandler, Somerville businesswoman (Democratic)
- C. Max Kortepeter (Independent Reform)
- Michael A. Notarangelo (Populist)
- Dick Zimmer, state senator from Flemington (Republican)

==== Campaign ====
In the general election, Republicans ran radio advertisements including a clip of Chandler praising Governor Florio's "courage" in passing his $2.8 billion tax and addressing state budgetary issues "in a very straightforward way." The ads concluded, "We won't get fooled again."

==== Results ====
1990 U.S. House election
Party	Candidate	Votes	%	±%
Republican	Dick Zimmer	107,851	64.05%	▼5.22
Democratic	Marguerite Chandler	52,256	31.03%	▲1.14
Independent	Joan I. Bottcher	4,441	2.64%	N/A
Independent	C. Max Kortepeter	2,431	1.44%	N/A
Populist	Michael A. Notarangelo	1,411	0.84%	N/A
Total votes		168,390	100.00%	
Republican hold		Swing	{{{swing}}}	

== District 13 ==
1990 New Jersey's 13th congressional district election
- November 6, 1990
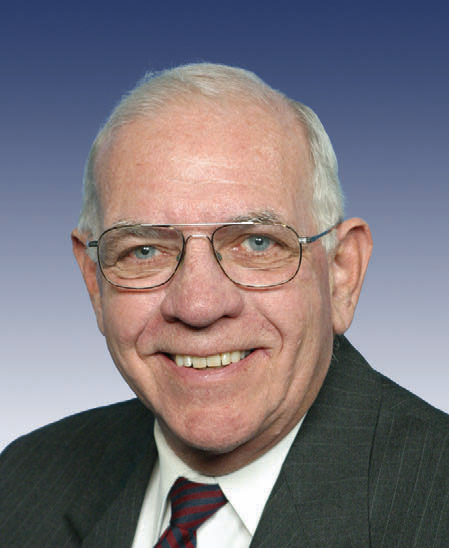

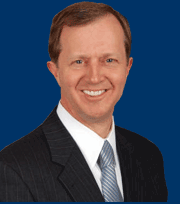
Nominee	Jim Saxton	John Adler
Party	Republican	Democratic
Popular vote	99,688	67,587
Percentage	58.2%	39.4%
U.S. Representative before election
Jim Saxton
Republican
Elected U.S. Representative
Jim Saxton
Republican

Incumbent Republican Jim Saxton won. This district included parts of Burlington, Camden, and Ocean counties.

=== Republican primary ===
==== Candidates ====
- William Monk
- Jim Saxton, incumbent Representative since 1984

==== Results ====
1990 Republican primary
Party	Candidate	Votes	%
Republican	Jim Saxton (incumbent)	16,719	93.38%
Republican	William Monk	1,186	6.62%
Total votes		17,905	100.00%

=== Democratic primary ===
==== Candidates ====
- John Adler, former Cherry Hill councilman
- Eugene Creech
- Michael DiMarco

==== Results ====
1990 Democratic primary
Party	Candidate	Votes	%
Democratic	John Adler	10,126	67.94%
Democratic	Michael DiMarco	2,724	18.28%
Democratic	Eugene Creech		13.79%
Total votes		14,905	100.00%

=== General election ===
==== Candidates ====
- John Adler, former Cherry Hill councilman (Democratic)
- Howard Scott Pearlman (World Without War)
- Jim Saxton, incumbent Representative since 1984 (Republican)

==== Results ====
1990 U.S. House election
Party	Candidate	Votes	%	±%
Republican	Jim Saxton (incumbent)	99,688	58.16%	▼11.32
Democratic	John Adler	67,587	39.43%	▲8.91
Independent	Howard Scott Pearlman	4,131	2.41%	N/A
Total votes		171,406	100.00%	
Republican hold		Swing	{{{swing}}}	

== District 14 ==
1990 New Jersey's 14th congressional district election
- November 6, 1990
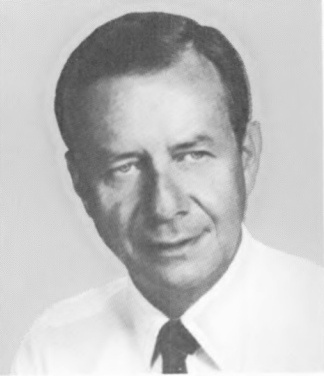

Nominee	Frank Guarini	Fred Theemling Jr.
Party	Democratic	Republican
Popular vote	56,455	24,870
Percentage	66.2%	29.2%
U.S. Representative before election
Frank J. Guarini
Democratic
Elected U.S. Representative
Frank J. Guarini
Democratic

Incumbent Democrat Frank J. Guarini won. This district included parts Hudson County.

=== Democratic primary ===
==== Candidates ====
- Gil Corby
- Frank J. Guarini, incumbent Representative since 1979

==== Results ====
1990 Democratic primary
Party	Candidate	Votes	%
Democratic	Frank J. Guarini (incumbent)	32,637	90.72%
Democratic	Gil Corby	3,337	9.28%
Total votes		35,974	100.00%

=== Republican primary ===
==== Candidates ====
- Jorge T. Gallo
- Fred J. Theemling Jr., former Hudson County assistant prosecutor and candidate for this district in 1988

==== Results ====
1990 Republican primary
Party	Candidate	Votes	%
Republican	Fred J. Theemling Jr.	2,928	52.39%
Republican	Jorge T. Gallo	2,661	47.61%
Total votes		5,589	100.00%

=== General election ===
==== Candidates ====
- Frank J. Guarini, incumbent Representative since 1979 (Democratic)
- Jane E. Harris (Socialist Workers)
- Donald K. Stoveken (Populist)
- Fred J. Theemling Jr., former Hudson County assistant prosecutor and candidate for this district in 1988 (Republican)
- Louis Vernotico (Right to Vote)
- Michael Ziruolo (Better Affordable Government)

==== Results ====
1990 U.S. House election
Party	Candidate	Votes	%	±%
Democratic	Frank J. Guarini (incumbent)	56,455	66.20%	▼1.14
Republican	Fred J. Theemling Jr.	24,870	29.16%	▼1.46
Independent	Michael Ziruolo	1,822	2.14%	N/A
Socialist Workers	Jane Harris	1,318	1.55%	N/A
Populist	Donald K. Stoveken	502	0.59%	N/A
Independent	Louis Vernotico	309	0.36%	N/A
Total votes		85,276	100.00%	
Democratic hold		Swing	{{{swing}}}	
