= John H. Ewing =

American politician

President pro tempore of the New Jersey Senate
- In office January 14, 1992 – January 11, 1994
- Preceded by: John F. Russo
- Succeeded by: Joseph A. Palaia

Member of the New Jersey Senate from the 16th district
- In office January 10, 1978 – January 13, 1998
- Preceded by: Raymond Bateman
- Succeeded by: Walter J. Kavanaugh

Member of the New Jersey General Assembly
- In office January 9, 1968 – January 10, 1978 Serving with Victor A. Rizzolo and Walter J. Kavanaugh (1974–1978)
- Preceded by: District created
- Succeeded by: Elliott F. Smith
- Constituency: 8th district (1968–1974); 16th district (1974–1978)

Personal details
- Born: October 16, 1918 New York City, New York, U.S.
- Died: May 31, 2012 (aged 93) Northfield, Vermont, U.S.
- Party: Republican

John H. "Jack" Ewing (October 16, 1918 – May 31, 2012) was an American Republican Party politician who served in both houses of the New Jersey Legislature: in the General Assembly from 1968 to 1977 and in the State Senate from 1978 to 1998, representing the 16th Legislative District.

== Early life and education ==
Ewing was born October 16, 1918 in New York City, the youngest of three children, to James Gillespie Blaine Ewing Sr. (1880–1965) and Clara Bertha Ewing (née Fleitmann; 1889–1943). His siblings were; James Gillespie Blaine Ewing Jr. (1912–1995) and Nancy Elizabeth Ewing (1915–2001). Through his mother he was a member of the Fleitmann family.

Ewing attended Trinity College, but dropped out after two years. He served in the United States Army from 1940 to 1946 and again from 1951 to 1952, attaining the rank of first lieutenant and earning the Bronze Star Medal for his World War II service in New Guinea and the Philippines.

== Career ==
He went into state politics after retiring as chairman of the board of Abercrombie & Fitch in 1967.

He served on the Somerset County Board of Chosen Freeholders in 1966 and 1967. He was active in the New Jersey Republican Party, serving as a delegate to the 1964 Republican National Convention, as a member of the Republican State Executive Committee from 1964 to 1968, and two terms as chair of the Republican State Finance Committee from 1965 to 1969 and from 1975 to 1978.

Ewing was elected to the New Jersey General Assembly in 1967, and served there until 1978, when he was elected to fill the seat that had been occupied by Raymond Bateman, who ran that year, and lost, in a bid for Governor of New Jersey. He served in the Senate as Assistant Minority Whip in 1980 and as President Pro Tempore in 1992 and 1993. He was a longtime chair of the Education Committee, Chair of the Joint Committee on Public Schools, and a member of the Women's Issues, Children and Family Services Committee, the Budget and Appropriations Committee and the Joint Budget Oversight Committee.

As chair of the Senate's Education Committee, Ewing played a major role in shaping the state's education system, where he supported charter schools, prison education and the 1994 disestablishment of the New Jersey Department of Higher Education. He also supported state takeovers of mismanaged school districts, pushing for a seizure of the Newark Public Schools in 1995. Ewing opposed state funding for economically disadvantaged schools and felt that there was no reason that richer districts could not be better supported than poorer ones, noting that "Some people drive a Mercedes; some drive a Ford Taurus, like me", but "[w]e can't pay for everyone to drive a Mercedes".

In 1996 his wife, Allison Ewing then age 76, was involved in what was determined the accidental death of a friend, Peggy Pulleyn, age 85. Pulleyn was walking down a road in Bedminster. Ewing had driven past Pulleyn and stopped, backing up the vehicle to speak with her. In the process, she backed over Pulleyn, resulting in her death.

Ewing chose not to run for re-election in 1997 after 30 years in the legislature. He was replaced in the Senate by Walter J. Kavanaugh, with Peter J. Biondi elected to Kavanaugh's former seat in the Assembly. Ewing remarked that "Dear Walter [Kavanaugh] has been waiting and waiting to take my place... he keeps threatening to push me in front of a bus".

Ewing had been a resident of Bedminster, New Jersey. He died at the age of 93 on May 31, 2012, in Northfield, Vermont.

New Jersey General Assembly
Preceded by District created	Member of the New Jersey General Assembly from the 8th district January 9, 1968–January 8, 1974	Succeeded by District abolished
Preceded by District created	Member of the New Jersey General Assembly from the 16th district January 8, 1974–January 10, 1978; Served alongside: Victor A. Rizzolo and Walter J. Kavanaugh	Succeeded by Elliott F. Smith
New Jersey Senate
Preceded by Raymond Bateman	Member of the New Jersey Senate from the 16th district January 10, 1978–January 13, 1998	Succeeded by Walter J. Kavanaugh
