= Andrew Zwicker =

American physicist and member of the New Jersey General Assembly

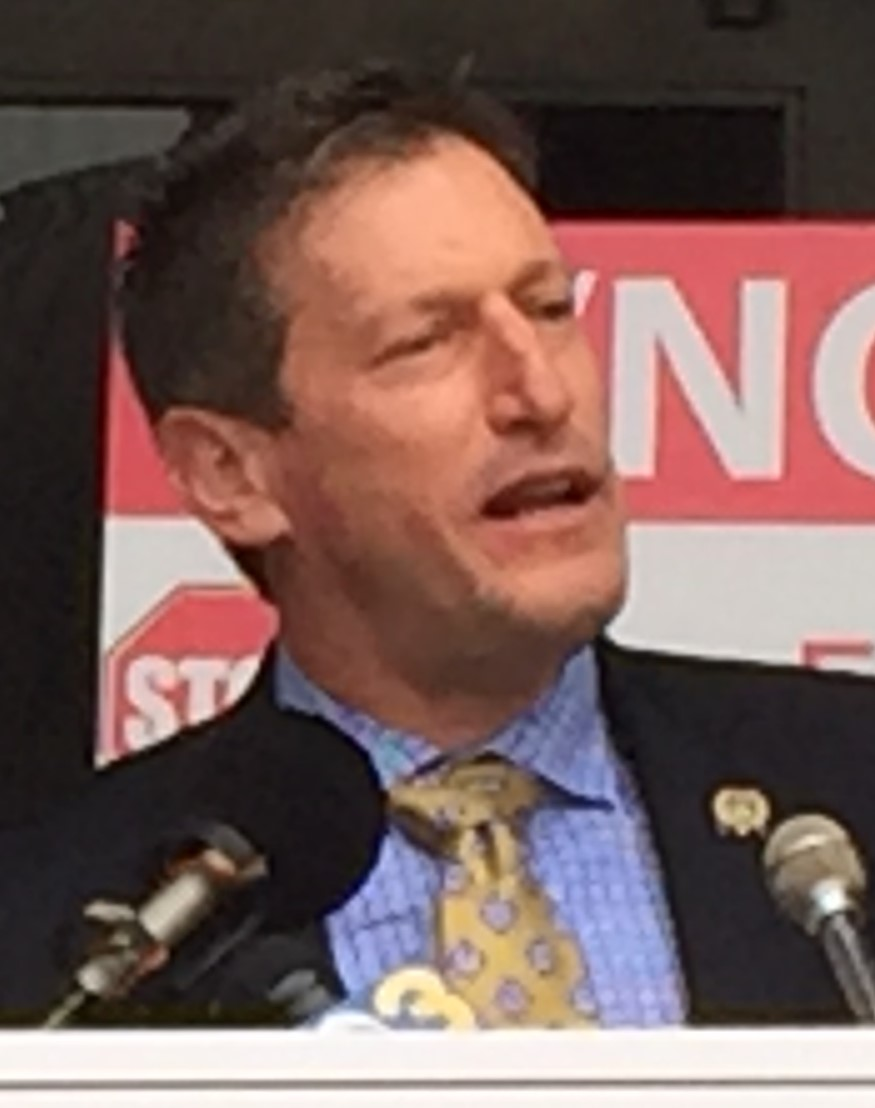

Member of the New Jersey Senate from the 16th district
- Incumbent
- Assumed office January 11, 2022
- Preceded by: Kip Bateman

Member of the New Jersey General Assembly from the 16th district
- In office January 12, 2016 – January 11, 2022 Serving with Jack Ciattarelli (2016–2018); Roy Freiman (2018–2022)
- Preceded by: Donna Simon
- Succeeded by: Sadaf Jaffer

Personal details
- Born: May 17, 1964 (age 62) New York City, New York, U.S.
- Party: Democratic
- Education: Bard College (BS); Johns Hopkins University (MS, PhD)
- Website: State Senate website

Andrew P. Zwicker (born May 17, 1964) is an American physicist and politician who has served in the New Jersey Senate from the 16th Legislative District since 2022. He previously served in the New Jersey General Assembly representing the 16th District from 2016 to 2022. Zwicker was a candidate for the United States House of Representatives in New Jersey's 12th congressional district in 2014.

He is a member of the Democratic Party as well as the head of the Science Education Department of the Princeton Plasma Physics Laboratory. He has been described as a protégé of former Representative Rush Holt Jr.

== Early life ==
Zwicker was born in New York City. Raised in Englewood, New Jersey, where he graduated from Dwight Morrow High School in 1982, he went on to achieve his B.A. in physics from Bard College in 1986, and his M.A. and Ph.D., both also in physics, from Johns Hopkins University in 1992. His dissertation was entitled "Soft X-Ray Spectroscopy of Magnetically Confined Fusion Plasmas Using Flat Multilayer Mirrors as Dispersive Elements". Zwicker's post-doctoral work focused on fusion energy research at the Princeton Plasma Physics Laboratory, at Oak Ridge National Laboratory, and internationally.

=== Personal life ===
Zwicker resides in Princeton, New Jersey. He is an atheist.

== Academic career ==
=== Academic achievements ===
He has been the head of the Science Education Department of the Princeton Plasma Physics Laboratory since 2003, where his work is focused on creating innovative opportunities for students of all backgrounds to engage in scientific inquiry and his research is centered on plasmas as an educational tool and new methods of science communication. At Princeton University, Zwicker was previously a part-time lecturer in the Writing Program and a faculty advisor for freshmen and sophomores in Rockefeller College. Zwicker has served on several national committees on education, is a Fellow of the American Physical Society, and The American Association of Physics Teachers has named him to its list of 75 leading contributors to physics education. He was the Editor of the APS Forum on Physics and Society's newsletter and a past chair of that Forum. Additionally, he is a past member of the APS Committee on Education. In 2006, Zwicker and a collaborator won the university's Art of Science competition for a photograph entitled "Plasma Table" and was for several years afterwards a co-organizer of the event.

=== Publications and appearances ===
Zwicker has published in both science and education journals, and has also appeared at numerous lectures and on television.

His publications include:

- Andrew P. Zwicker, Josh Bloom, Robert Albertson, and Sophia Gershman, Suitability of 3D Printed Plastic Parts for Laboratory Use, American Journal of Physics 83, 281 (2015)
- S. Wissel, J. Ross, S. Gershman, and A. Zwicker, The Use of DC Glow Discharges as Undergraduate Educational Tools, American Journal of Physics, Vol.81, Issue 9 (2013)
- Edward Thomas, George Morales. Michael Brown, Troy Carter, Donald Correll, Kenneth Gentle, Andrew Zwicker, Ken Schultz, Earl Scime, Don Steiner, Fusion in the Era of Burning Plasma Studies: Workforce Planning for 2004 to 2014, Journal of Fusion Energy, Vol. 22, No. 2, June 2004.
- A.P. Zwicker, R.C. Isler, W. Tighe, S. Paul, M. Ono, B. LeBlanc, R. Bell, H. Kugel, Impurity Behavior During Ion Bernstein Wave Heating in the PBX-M Tokamak, Nuclear Fusion, 35(2), 215 (1995).

== Campaign for United States House of Representatives ==
Zwicker ran for the Democratic nomination for the United States House of Representatives in the 12th Congressional District. He was seeking election to the seat then held by Rush D. Holt Jr., who announced on February 18 that he would not seek re-election in the 2014 cycle. He finished fourth of the four candidates in the Democratic primary election held on June 3 (Assemblywoman Bonnie Watson Coleman won the primary and general elections), but impressed and gained support from party leaders to lead Zwicker to run for Assembly.

== New Jersey Assembly ==
=== 2015 ===
He and his running mate Maureen Vella ran as Democrats in the historically-Republican dominated 16th Legislative District. Three days after the election, the race for the second seat elected between Zwicker and incumbent Republican Assemblywoman Donna Simon was considered "too close to call." The other incumbent Republican Assemblyman, Jack Ciattarelli, had finished far enough ahead in first place to be ensured a victory. Zwicker had a 29-vote lead over Simon with some provisional ballots remaining to be counted. On November 9, 2015, the final provisional ballots were counted, with Zwicker finishing with a 78-vote lead over Simon. On November 16, Simon conceded the race to Zwicker and Republican officials stated that no recount will be requested. He became the first Democrat ever elected to the district in its 42-year history, albeit in a more Democratic form than it had prior to redistricting thanks to the addition of the liberal university town of Princeton.

=== 2017 ===
In the November 2017 general election, with Republican incumbent Jack Ciattarelli leaving the Assembly in his unsuccessful run for the republican gubernatorial nomination, Zwicker (with 34,233 votes; 27.2% of all ballots cast) and his running mate, newcomer Roy Freiman (32,714; 26.0%), defeated Republican challengers Mark Caliguire (29,041; 23.1%) and Donna Simon (29,674; 23.6%) to win both Assembly seats from the district for the Democrats for the first time in district history.

=== 2019 ===
Zwicker and Freiman beat Mark Caliguire again, and newcomer Christine Madrid, by a convincing margin Preserving the seat for Democrats for another two years and being the first time that two Democrats were re-elected as Assembly Members for the 16th district.

== New Jersey Senate ==
=== 2021 ===
On December 2, 2020, Zwicker announced he would run for the 16th district State Senate seat. The incumbent Kip Bateman announced his retirement, making the seat an open race. He was challenged by former Congressman Mike Pappas. Despite the election cycle being a loss for Democrats, Zwicker was able to win the seat and be the only flip from a Republican seat, to a Democrat seat in 2021.

=== 2023 ===
Andrew Zwicker was again challenged in a rematch by Mike Pappas. The race was noted by the New Jersey Globe as one of the most competitive in the state. Despite this, Zwicker won by a convincing margin of 14.5% points holding the seats for Democrats for the next 4 years.

=== Committees ===
Committee assignments for the 2024—2025 Legislative Session are:

- Legislative Oversight (as chair)
- Higher Education (as vice-chair)
- Labor (as vice-chair)
- Budget and Appropriations

=== District 16 ===
Each of the 40 districts in the New Jersey Legislature has one representative in the New Jersey Senate and two members in the New Jersey General Assembly. The representatives from the 16th District for the 2024—2025 Legislative Session are:

- Senator Andrew Zwicker (D)
- Assemblyman Roy Freiman (D)
- Assemblywoman Mitchelle Drulis (D)

== Electoral history ==
=== United States House of Representatives ===
2014 Democratic Primary - United States House of Representatives 12th District
Party	Candidate	Votes	%
Democratic	Bonnie Watson Coleman	15,603	43.0
Democratic	Linda R. Greenstein	10,089	27.8
Democratic	Upendra J. Chivukula	7,890	21.8
Democratic	Andrew Zwicker	2,668	7.4

=== Senate ===
16th Legislative District General Election, 2023
Party	Candidate	Votes	%
Democratic	Andrew Zwicker (incumbent)	34,693	56.5
Republican	Michael Pappas	25,839	42.0
Libertarian	Richard J. Byrne	922	1.5
Total votes		61,454	100.0
Democratic hold			

New Jersey general election, 2021
Party	Candidate	Votes	%
Democratic	Andrew Zwicker	41,837	53.32
Republican	Michael Pappas	36,632	46.68
Total votes		78,469	100.0

=== Assembly ===
New Jersey general election, 2019
Party	Candidate	Votes	%
Democratic	Andrew Zwicker	26,280	27.85
Democratic	Roy Freiman	25,077	26.58
Republican	Mark Caliguire	21,606	22.9
Republican	Christine Madrid	21,387	22.67
Total votes		94,350	100.0

New Jersey general election, 2017
Party	Candidate	Votes	%	±%
Democratic	Andrew Zwicker	34,233	27.2	▲2.2
Democratic	Roy Freiman	32,714	26.0	▲1.4
Republican	Donna Simon	29,674	23.6	▼1.3
Republican	Mark Caliguire	29,041	23.1	▼2.3
Total votes		'125,662'	'100.0'	

New Jersey general election, 2015
Party	Candidate	Votes	%	±%
Republican	Jack Ciattarelli	16,577	25.4	▼2.9
Democratic	Andrew Zwicker	16,308	25.03	▲2.9
Republican	Donna Simon	16,230	24.91	▼2.9
Democratic	Maureen Vella	16,043	24.6	▲3.8
Total votes		'65,158'	'100.0'	
