= Roy Freiman =

American Democratic Party politician

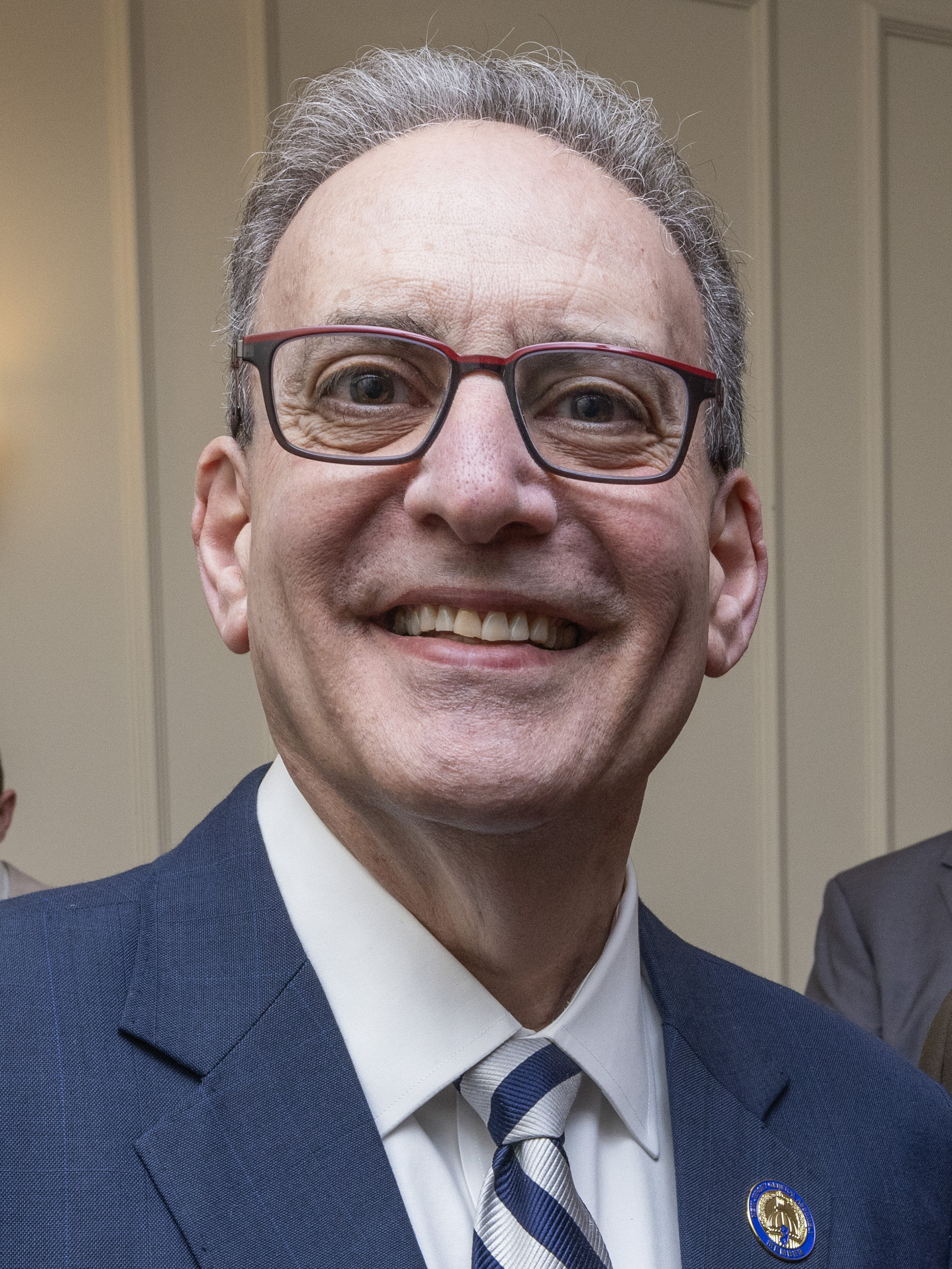
- Freiman in 2025

Member of the New Jersey General Assembly from the 16th district
- Incumbent
- Assumed office January 9, 2018 Serving with Andrew Zwicker (2018-2022); Sadaf Jaffer (2022-2024); Mitchelle Drulis (2024-present)
- Preceded by: Jack Ciattarelli

Personal details
- Born: April 30, 1959 (age 67)
- Party: Democratic
- Spouse: Victoria
- Children: 2
- Education: State University of New York at Oneonta; Brunel University London
- Occupation: Insurance executive
- Website: Legislative Webpage

Roy Freiman (born April 30, 1959) is an American Democratic Party politician who has represented the 16th Legislative District in the New Jersey General Assembly since 2018, replacing Jack Ciattarelli, who did not seek re-election to his seat to run unsuccessfully for Governor of New Jersey in the 2017 primaries.

== Personal life ==
A resident of Hillsborough Township, Freiman graduated from the State University of New York at Oneonta with a bachelor's degree in business finance and attended Brunel University London. He is a Chartered Life Underwriter and Chartered Financial Consultant. He worked for more than 20 years at Prudential Financial, where he was a vice president of strategy and analytics. Freiman served in 2017 on the Hillsborough Township Sustainability Committee.

== New Jersey General Assembly ==
In the November 2017 general election, with Jack Ciattarelli leaving the Assembly in his unsuccessful run for the gubernatorial nomination, Freiman (with 32,714 votes; 26.0% of all ballots cast) and his running mate, incumbent Andrew Zwicker (with 34,233; 27.2%), defeated Republican challengers Mark Caliguire (29,041; 23.1%) and Donna Simon (29,674; 23.6%) to win both Assembly seats from the district for the Democrats.

=== Committees ===
Committee assignments for the current session are:

- Agriculture and Food Security, Chair
- Commerce and Economic Development
- Financial Institutions and Insurance

=== District 16 ===
Each of the 40 districts in the New Jersey Legislature has one representative in the New Jersey Senate and two members in the New Jersey General Assembly. The representatives from the 16th District for the 2024—2025 Legislative Session are:

- Senator Andrew Zwicker (D)
- Assemblywoman Mitchelle Drulis (D)
- Assemblyman Roy Freiman (D)

== Electoral history ==
=== Assembly ===
16th Legislative District General Election, 2023
Party	Candidate	Votes	%
Democratic	Roy Freiman (incumbent)	34,188	28.3
Democratic	Mitchelle Drulis	33,642	27.9
Republican	Grace Zhang	26,558	22.0
Republican	Ross Traphagen	26,293	21.8
Total votes		120,663	100.0
Democratic hold			
Democratic hold			

New Jersey general election, 2021
Party	Candidate	Votes	%
Democratic	Roy Freiman (incumbent)	40,992	26.67%
Democratic	Sadaf Jaffer	39,512	25.71%
Republican	Vincent T. Panico	36,924	24.03%
Republican	Joseph A. Lukac III	36,251	23.59%
Total votes		153,679	100.0
Democratic hold			

New Jersey general election, 2019
Party	Candidate	Votes	%
Democratic	Andrew Zwicker (incumbent)	26,280	27.85%
Democratic	Roy Freiman (incumbent)	25,077	26.58%
Republican	Mark Caliguire	21,606	22.9%
Republican	Christine Madrid	21,387	22.67%
Total votes		94,350	100%
Democratic hold			

New Jersey general election, 2017
Party	Candidate	Votes	%	±%
Democratic	Andrew Zwicker	34,233	27.2	▲2.2
Democratic	Roy Freiman	32,714	26.0	▲1.4
Republican	Donna Simon	29,674	23.6	▼1.3
Republican	Mark Caliguire	29,041	23.1	▼2.3
Total votes		125,662	100.0	

New Jersey General Assembly
Preceded by Jack Ciattarelli	Member of the New Jersey General Assembly for the 16th District; January 9, 2018–present With: Andrew Zwicker, Sadaf Jaffer, Mitchelle Drulis	Succeeded by Incumbent
