= Elliott F. Smith =

American politician

Member of the New Jersey General Assembly from the 16th district
- In office January 10, 1978 – January 10, 1984 Serving with Walter J. Kavanaugh
- Preceded by: John H. Ewing
- Succeeded by: John S. Penn

Personal details
- Born: February 11, 1931 New York City, New York
- Died: March 1987 (aged 55–56)
- Party: Republican

Elliott F. Smith (February 11, 1931 – March 1987) was an American Republican Party politician who served in the New Jersey General Assembly from 1978 to 1984, representing the 16th Legislative District.

Born in New York City, Smith grew up in Hillsborough Township, New Jersey and attended Somerville High School before studying agriculture at Rutgers University. A resident of the Belle Mead section of Hillsborough Township, Smith was a partner of Sentry Electric Company.

In 1974, Smith was appointed to fill the seat on the Hillsborough Township Committee that became vacant when Warren Nevins resigned to take a seat on the Somerset County Board of Chosen Freeholders.

New Jersey General Assembly
Preceded by John H. Ewing	Member of the New Jersey General Assembly from the 16th district January 10, 1978–January 10, 1984; Served alongside: Walter J. Kavanaugh	Succeeded by John S. Penn
