= Donna Simon =

American politician

Member of the New Jersey General Assembly from the 16th district
- In office January 30, 2012 – January 12, 2016
- Preceded by: Denise Coyle
- Succeeded by: Andrew Zwicker

Personal details
- Born: March 25, 1960 (age 66)
- Party: Republican
- Spouse: Michael
- Children: 2
- Education: Union County Technical Institute, Kean College

Donna M. Simon (born March 25, 1960) is an American Republican Party politician who served in the New Jersey General Assembly, representing the 16th legislative district from January 30, 2012, until January 12, 2016. Prior to her Assembly career, she served on the Readington Township Committee.

== Biography ==
Simon was educated at Kean College and the School of Cardiac Technology at Union County Technical Institute. She is trained as a cardiovascular specialist.

Simon joined the Readington Township Board of Health in 2009. She first ran for elected office in November 2010 for a seat on the Readington Township Committee and began her term in January 2011.

In November 2011, Peter J. Biondi died two days after he was re-elected to his Assembly seat representing the 16th legislative district. Jack Ciattarelli, who concurrently won District 16's other Assembly seat, was sworn in on December 5, 2011 to complete Biondi's unexpired term; Ciattarelli was sworn in for his first full term on January 10, 2012, leaving Biondi's seat vacant again. By a Republican convention of district delegates from Hunterdon, Mercer, Middlesex and Somerset counties, Simon was selected on January 19, 2012 to fill Biondi's term pending a special election and was sworn in on January 30, 2012.

In the November 2012 special election to finish Biondi's term, Simon ran against Democrat Marie Corfield, a Raritan Township art teacher who achieved fame for facing off against Governor Chris Christie at a 2010 town hall meeting. On November 7, a day after the election, unofficial results showed Simon leading Corfield by 1,700 votes, but Corfield refused to concede until all outstanding ballots were counted. On November 30, Corfield conceded after final results showed Simon winning by about 1,000 votes.

Simon was re-elected in 2013 alongside Ciattarelli. In 2015, the two faced a strong challenge from Democrats Andrew Zwicker and Maureen Vella. Election night results indicated that Ciattarelli placed first and was re-elected, Vella placed fourth, and the race for the second seat between Simon and Zwicker was "too close to call." Three days after the election, Zwicker held a 67-vote lead over Simon with some provisional ballots remaining to be counted. On November 9, 2015, the final provisional ballots were counted, with Zwicker finishing with a 78-vote lead over Simon. On November 16, 2015, Simon conceded the race to Zwicker and Republican officials stated that no recount will be requested. Simon later unsuccessfully ran again for the Assembly in 2017.

While in the Assembly, she served on the Assembly Education and Telecommunications & Utilities committees in addition to the Joint Committee on the Public Schools.

New Jersey General Assembly
Preceded by Denise Coyle	Member of the New Jersey General Assembly for the 16th District; January 30, 2012 – January 12, 2016; With: Jack Ciattarelli	Succeeded by Andrew Zwicker
