= Denise Coyle =

American Republican Party politician

Member of the New Jersey General Assembly from the 16th district
- In office 2008–2012 Serving with Peter J. Biondi (2008–2011); Jack Ciattarelli (2011–2012)
- Preceded by: Kip Bateman
- Succeeded by: Donna Simon

Personal details
- Born: June 22, 1953 (age 73)
- Party: Republican
- Spouse: Dr. Dennis Coyle
- Children: 2
- Education: Saint Mary's College, Rutgers School of Law - Camden

Denise Coyle (born June 22, 1953) is an American Republican Party politician who served in the New Jersey General Assembly from January 2008 to January 2012, where she represented the 16th Legislative District.

In the Assembly, Coyle served on the Financial Institutions and Insurance Committee and the Human Services Committee.

Coyle was a member of the Somerset County Board of Chosen Freeholders from 1996 to 2007, serving as Deputy Director in 1998, 2003 and 2007 and as Director in 1999 and 2004. She served on the Branchburg Township Committee from 1992 to 1996, serving as Deputy Mayor of Branchburg in 1994, and as Mayor of Branchburg, New Jersey in 1993.

Coyle received a B.A. in History from Saint Mary's College, Notre Dame, Indiana, and was awarded a J.D. from Rutgers School of Law - Camden. Coyle is married to Dr. Dennis Coyle and has two daughters, Kathryn and Kara.

Coyle did not run for re-election in 2011. She was succeeded by Donna Simon.
