= New Jersey's 16th legislative district =

American legislative district

- Senator: Andrew Zwicker (D)
- Assembly members: Roy Freiman (D); Mitchelle Drulis (D)
- Registration: 36.32% Democratic; 26.17% Republican; 36.69% unaffiliated
- Demographics: 59.0% White; 5.0% Black/African American; 0.3% Native American; 23.7% Asian; 0.0% Hawaiian/Pacific Islander; 4.3% Other race; 7.7% Two or more races; 10.7% Hispanic
- Population: 233,626
- Voting-age population: 183,325
- Registered voters: 180,724

New Jersey's 16th legislative district is one of 40 in the New Jersey Legislature. The district includes the Hunterdon County municipalities of Clinton Town, Clinton Township, Flemington Borough, High Bridge, Lebanon, Raritan Township, and Readington Township; the Mercer County municipality of Princeton; the Middlesex County municipality of South Brunswick Township; and the Somerset County municipalities of Branchburg Township, Hillsborough Township, Millstone Borough, Montgomery Township, and Rocky Hill Borough.

== Demographic characteristics ==
As of the 2020 United States census, the district had a population of 233,626, of whom 183,325 (78.5%) were of voting age. The racial makeup of the district was 137,853 (59.0%) White, 11,606 (5.0%) African American, 660 (0.3%) Native American, 55,381 (23.7%) Asian, 78 (0.0%) Pacific Islander, 10,118 (4.3%) from some other race, and 17,930 (7.7%) from two or more races. Hispanic or Latino of any race were 25,020 (10.7%) of the population.

The district had 180,724 registered voters as of December 1, 2021, of whom 68,632 (38.0%) were registered as unaffiliated, 65,999 (36.5%) were registered as Democrats, 44,514 (24.6%) were registered as Republicans, and 1,579 (0.9%) were registered to other parties.

Home ownership was high as was the percentage of college graduates. District residents were comparatively wealthy, with high incomes and property values that have resulted in low municipal and other property taxes. The district has low numbers of African-Americans, the elderly and poor children. Prior to the 2011 apportionment, registered Republicans outnumbered Democrats by a 2 to 1 margin. Throughout most of the district's history, Republicans held a strong grip in winning elections with the district electing only Republican legislators for over 40 years, one of two in the state (the 40th district is the other). However, the 2011 round of redistricting made the district significantly more Democratic. It gained the Democratic strongholds of Princeton and South Brunswick and lost Bridgewater, Mendham Borough and the Somerset Hills, all of which leaned Republican. The district elected its first Democrat, Andrew Zwicker, in 2015.

== Political representation ==
For the 2026–2027 session, the 16th legislative district of the New Jersey Legislature is represented in the New Jersey Senate by Andrew Zwicker (D, South Brunswick) and in the General Assembly by Mitchelle Drulis (D, East Amwell Township) and Roy Freiman (D, Hillsborough Township).

The legislative district overlaps with New Jersey's 7th and 12th congressional districts.

== Apportionment history ==
When the 40-district legislative map was created in 1973, the 16th district consisted of all of Somerset County (except Franklin Township and Manville and included Readington in Hunterdon County, and Morris County's Chester Borough and Township and Mendham Borough. Long-time Senator Raymond Bateman (who had previously served from the 8th district and the Somerset County district) ran for Governor of New Jersey in 1977, losing to Brendan Byrne, with John H. Ewing taking Bateman's seat in the Senate and Elliott F. Smith taking Ewing's former seat in the Assembly.

Following the 1981 redistricting, the district largely remained the same with Rocky Hill and Millstone boroughs being shifted to the 14th district, Readington trading with East Amwell Township to be Hunterdon's lone municipality in the district, and the removal of the Chesters to add Mendham Township in the Morris County portion. Again, most of Somerset County remained a part of the 16th for the 1991 redistricting, but Franklin Township and its neighboring Somerset County boroughs were added to the district while Bound Brook, Warren Township, Green Brook, Wharton, and North Plainfield were shifted elsewhere; the only municipality outside of Somerset included in the district this decade was Mendham Borough. John Ewing chose not to run for re-election in 1997 after 30 years in the legislature. He was replaced in the Senate by Walter J. Kavanaugh, with Peter J. Biondi elected to Kavanaugh's former seat in the Assembly. Ewing remarked that "Dear Walter [Kavanaugh] has been waiting and waiting to take my place... he keeps threatening to push me in front of a bus".

Changes to the district made as part of the New Jersey Legislative redistricting in 2001, based on the results of the 2000 United States census, added Bound Brook (from the 17th legislative district) and removed Franklin Township (to the 17th legislative district). Kip Bateman moved up to the Senate to fill the seat vacated by the retirement of Walter Kavanaugh in the 2007 elections. Peter Biondi won re-election and was joined in the Assembly by Denise Coyle, a member of the Somerset County Board of Chosen Freeholders.

Prior to the 2011 decennial reapportionment, as part of the 2001 apportionment, the district consisted of the Somerset County municipalities of Bedminster Township, Bernards Township, Bernardsville Borough, Bound Brook Borough, Branchburg Township, Bridgewater Township, Far Hills Borough, Hillsborough Township, Manville Borough, Millstone Borough, Montgomery Township, Peapack-Gladstone Borough, Raritan Borough, Rocky Hill Borough, Somerville Borough, and South Bound Brook Borough and the Morris County municipality of Mendham Borough.

In 2011, Coyle declined to run for re-election as her Bernards Township home was moved out of the district and the seat was won by Jack Ciattarelli, a member of the Somerset County Board of Chosen Freeholders. After Peter Biondi died two days after winning re-election, Ciattarelli was appointed to complete Biondi's unexpired term ending January 10, 2012. Biondi's seat was then vacant again until Readington Township committeewoman Donna Simon was sworn in on January 30, 2012 as an interim appointee pending a November 2012 special election where she defeated Marie Corfield by just under 1,000 votes out of 91,000 ballots cast. Simon & Ciattarelli were both re-elected, but Simon was defeated in 2015 in a close race by Democrat Andrew Zwicker in 2015. Initial counts showed Simon ahead of Zwicker on the night of the election (Ciattarelli was far enough ahead in first place to be ensured victory) but following the counting of provisional ballots, Simon conceded November 16.

== Election history ==
Session	Senate	General Assembly	
1974–1975	Raymond Bateman (R)	Victor A. Rizzolo (R)	John H. Ewing (R)
1976–1977	Raymond Bateman (R)	Walter J. Kavanaugh (R)	John H. Ewing (R)
1978–1979	John H. Ewing (R)	Walter J. Kavanaugh (R)	Elliott F. Smith (R)
1980–1981	John H. Ewing (R)	Walter J. Kavanaugh (R)	Elliott F. Smith (R)
1982–1983	John H. Ewing (R)	Walter J. Kavanaugh (R)	Elliott F. Smith (R)
1984–1985	John H. Ewing (R)	Walter J. Kavanaugh (R)	John S. Penn (R)
1986–1987	John H. Ewing (R)	Walter J. Kavanaugh (R)	John S. Penn (R)
1988–1989	John H. Ewing (R)	Walter J. Kavanaugh (R)	John S. Penn (R)
1990–1991	John H. Ewing (R)	Walter J. Kavanaugh (R)	John S. Penn (R)
1992–1993	John H. Ewing (R)	Walter J. Kavanaugh (R)	John S. Penn (R)
1994–1995	John H. Ewing (R)	Walter J. Kavanaugh (R)	Christopher Bateman (R)
1996–1997	John H. Ewing (R)	Walter J. Kavanaugh (R)	Christopher Bateman (R)
1998–1999	Walter J. Kavanaugh (R)	Peter J. Biondi (R)	Christopher Bateman (R)
2000–2001	Walter J. Kavanaugh (R)	Peter J. Biondi (R)	Christopher Bateman (R)
2002–2003	Walter J. Kavanaugh (R)	Peter J. Biondi (R)	Christopher Bateman (R)
2004–2005	Walter J. Kavanaugh (R)	Peter J. Biondi (R)	Christopher Bateman (R)
2006–2007	Walter J. Kavanaugh (R)	Peter J. Biondi (R)	Christopher Bateman (R)
2008–2009	Christopher Bateman (R)	Peter J. Biondi (R)	Denise Coyle (R)
2010–2011	Christopher Bateman (R)	Peter J. Biondi (R) (Note: Died November 10, 2011)	Denise Coyle (R)
2010–2011	Christopher Bateman (R)	Jack Ciattarelli (R) (Note: Appointed to the Assembly on December 5, 2011 to complete the unexpired term of Biondi)	Denise Coyle (R)
2012–2013	Christopher Bateman (R)	Jack Ciattarelli (R)	Donna Simon (R) (Note: Appointed to the Assembly on January 30, 2012 to fill the seat of Biondi, elected in November 2012 special election to complete the term)
2014–2015	Christopher Bateman (R)	Jack Ciattarelli (R)	Donna Simon (R)
2016–2017	Christopher Bateman (R)	Jack Ciattarelli (R)	Andrew Zwicker (D)
2018–2019	Christopher Bateman (R)	Roy Freiman (D)	Andrew Zwicker (D)
2020–2021	Christopher Bateman (R)	Roy Freiman (D)	Andrew Zwicker (D)
2022–2023	Andrew Zwicker (D)	Roy Freiman (D)	Sadaf Jaffer (D)
2024–2025	Andrew Zwicker (D)	Roy Freiman (D)	Mitchelle Drulis (D)
2026–2027	Andrew Zwicker (D)	Roy Freiman (D)	Mitchelle Drulis (D)

== Election results ==
=== Senate ===
2021 New Jersey general election
Party	Candidate	Votes	%	±%
Democratic	Andrew Zwicker	41,837	53.3	▲3.7
Republican	Michael Pappas	36,632	46.7	▼3.7
Total votes		78,469	100.0	

New Jersey general election, 2017
Party	Candidate	Votes	%	±%
Republican	Christopher "Kip" Bateman	32,229	50.4	▼9.9
Democratic	Laurie Poppe	31,655	49.6	▲9.9
Total votes		63,884	100.0	

New Jersey general election, 2013
Party	Candidate	Votes	%	±%
Republican	Christopher "Kip" Bateman	34,865	60.3	▲5.7
Democratic	Christian R. Mastondrea	22,990	39.7	▼5.7
Total votes		57,855	100.0	

2011 New Jersey general election
Party	Candidate	Votes	%
Republican	Christopher "Kip" Bateman	21,040	54.6
Democratic	Maureen Vella	17,460	45.4
Total votes		38,500	100.0

2007 New Jersey general election
Party	Candidate	Votes	%	±%
Republican	Christopher "Kip" Bateman	27,846	61.6	▼38.4
Democratic	Wayne G. Fox	17,378	38.4	N/A
Total votes		45,224	100.0	

2003 New Jersey general election
Party	Candidate	Votes	%	±%
Republican	Walter J. Kavanaugh	28,843	100.0	▲33.4
Total votes		28,843	100.0	

2001 New Jersey general election
Party	Candidate	Votes	%
Republican	Walter J. Kavanaugh	39,073	66.6
Democratic	Daniel Wartenberg	19,589	33.4
Total votes		58,662	100.0

1997 New Jersey general election
Party	Candidate	Votes	%	±%
Republican	Walter J. Kavanaugh	44,171	63.8	▲2.2
Democratic	Mitchell E. Ignatoff	22,545	32.6	▼5.8
Conservative	Richard C. Martin	2,541	3.7	N/A
Total votes		69,257	100.0	

1993 New Jersey general election
Party	Candidate	Votes	%	±%
Republican	John Jack Ewing	43,060	61.6	▼6.8
Democratic	Marybeth Kohut	26,841	38.4	▲6.8
Total votes		69,901	100.0	

1991 New Jersey general election
Party	Candidate	Votes	%
Republican	John H. Ewing	33,059	68.4
Democratic	Bonnie C. Sovinee	15,255	31.6
Total votes		48,314	100.0

1987 New Jersey general election
Party	Candidate	Votes	%	±%
Republican	John H. Ewing	28,433	70.7	▲3.3
Democratic	Frank M. Reskin	11,764	29.3	▼3.3
Total votes		40,197	100.0	

1983 New Jersey general election
Party	Candidate	Votes	%	±%
Republican	John H. Ewing	27,383	67.4	▲1.9
Democratic	Alfred A. Wicklund	13,242	32.6	▼1.9
Total votes		40,625	100.0	

1981 New Jersey general election
Party	Candidate	Votes	%
Republican	John H. Ewing	38,026	65.5
Democratic	John F. Guerrera	20,068	34.5
Total votes		58,094	100.0

1977 New Jersey general election
Party	Candidate	Votes	%	±%
Republican	John H. Ewing	38,772	65.2	▲1.2
Democratic	Kenneth L. Hetrick	20,654	34.8	▼1.2
Total votes		59,426	100.0	

1973 New Jersey general election
Party	Candidate	Votes	%
Republican	Raymond H. Bateman	34,153	64.0
Democratic	Herbert Koransky	19,230	36.0
Total votes		53,383	100.0

=== General Assembly ===
2021 New Jersey general election
Party	Candidate	Votes	%	±%
Democratic	Roy Freiman	40,992	26.7	▼0.2
Democratic	Sadaf F. Jaffer	39,512	25.7	▼2.4
Republican	Vincent T. Panico	36,924	24.0	▲1.4
Republican	Joseph A. Lukac III	36,251	23.6	▲1.2
Total votes		153,679	100.0	

2019 New Jersey general election
Party	Candidate	Votes	%	±%
Democratic	Andrew Zwicker	27,732	28.1	▲0.9
Democratic	Roy Freiman	26,466	26.9	▲0.9
Republican	Mark Caliguire	22,276	22.6	▼0.5
Republican	Christine Madrid	22,068	22.4	▼1.2
Total votes		98,542	100.0	

New Jersey general election, 2017
Party	Candidate	Votes	%	±%
Democratic	Andrew Zwicker	34,233	27.2	▲2.2
Democratic	Roy Freiman	32,714	26.0	▲1.4
Republican	Donna M. Simon	29,674	23.6	▼1.3
Republican	Mark Caliguire	29,041	23.1	▼2.3
Total votes		125,662	100.0	

New Jersey general election, 2015
Party	Candidate	Votes	%	±%
Republican	Jack M. Ciattarelli	16,577	25.4	▼2.9
Democratic	Andrew Zwicker	16,308	25.03	▲2.9
Republican	Donna M. Simon	16,230	24.91	▼2.9
Democratic	Maureen Vella	16,043	24.6	▲3.8
Total votes		65,158	100.0	

New Jersey general election, 2013
Party	Candidate	Votes	%	±%
Republican	Jack M. Ciattarelli	32,125	28.3	▲2.2
Republican	Donna M. Simon	31,543	27.8	▲0.9
Democratic	Marie Corfield	25,112	22.1	▼1.4
Democratic	Ida Ochoteco	23,682	20.8	▼2.7
Libertarian	Patrick McKnight	1,202	1.1	N/A
Total votes		113,664	100.0	

Special election, November 6, 2012
Party	Candidate	Votes	%
Republican	Donna M. Simon	46,211	50.5
Democratic	Marie Corfield	45,235	49.5
Total votes		91,446	100.0

New Jersey general election, 2011
Party	Candidate	Votes	%
Republican	Peter J. Biondi	20,359	26.9
Republican	Jack M. Ciattarelli	19,770	26.1
Democratic	Joe Camarota	17,795	23.5
Democratic	Marie Corfield	17,779	23.5
Total votes		75,703	100.0

New Jersey general election, 2009
Party	Candidate	Votes	%	±%
Republican	Peter J. Biondi	45,199	33.9	▲4.8
Republican	Denise M. Coyle	44,612	33.4	▲4.1
Democratic	Roberta Karpinecz	22,172	16.6	▼4.7
Democratic	Mark Petraske	21,394	16.0	▼4.3
Total votes		133,377	100.0	

New Jersey general election, 2007
Party	Candidate	Votes	%	±%
Republican	Denise Coyle	26,027	29.3	▼2.9
Republican	Pete Biondi	25,876	29.1	▼2.7
Democratic	Michael Fedun	18,898	21.3	▲3.2
Democratic	William Kole	18,042	20.3	▲2.4
Total votes		88,843	100.0	

New Jersey general election, 2005
Party	Candidate	Votes	%	±%
Republican	Christopher “Kip” Bateman	40,097	32.2	▼6.3
Republican	Pete Biondi	39,710	31.8	▼7.2
Democratic	Michael Goldberg	22,569	18.1	▲0.3
Democratic	Charles Eader	22,336	17.9	N/A
Total votes		124,712	100.0	

New Jersey general election, 2003
Party	Candidate	Votes	%	±%
Republican	Pete Biondi	26,211	39.0	▲6.4
Republican	Christopher “Kip” Bateman	25,849	38.5	▲4.7
Democratic	Robert Mack	11,938	17.8	▲0.5
Green	Jane Hunter	3,219	4.8	N/A
Total votes		67,217	100.0	

New Jersey general election, 2001
Party	Candidate	Votes	%
Republican	Christopher “Kip” Bateman	39,136	33.8
Republican	Peter J. Biondi	37,788	32.6
Democratic	John P. Rooney	20,051	17.3
Democratic	James K. Foohey	18,948	16.3
Total votes		115,923	100.0

New Jersey general election, 1999
Party	Candidate	Votes	%	±%
Republican	Christopher “Kip” Bateman	24,646	31.2	▼0.6
Republican	Peter J. Biondi	23,789	30.2	▲0.2
Democratic	Mike Alper	15,393	19.5	▲2.0
Democratic	Donald Rudy	15,060	19.1	▲2.3
Total votes		78,888	100.0	

New Jersey general election, 1997
Party	Candidate	Votes	%	±%
Republican	Christopher “Kip” Bateman	43,458	31.8	▲3.1
Republican	Peter J. Biondi	41,008	30.0	▲1.4
Democratic	Amedeo D’Adamo, Jr.	23,920	17.5	▼1.3
Democratic	Harold Weber	22,921	16.8	▼0.6
Conservative	Robert Kowal	2,758	2.0	▼1.4
Conservative	Howard Manella	2,432	1.8	▼1.3
Total votes		136,497	100.0	

New Jersey general election, 1995
Party	Candidate	Votes	%	±%
Republican	Christopher “Kip” Bateman	22,406	28.7	▼3.3
Republican	Walter J. Kavanaugh	22,359	28.6	▼2.7
Democratic	Joseph Tricarico, Jr	14,683	18.8	0.0
Democratic	Mitchell E. Ignatoff, Jr	13,553	17.4	▲0.6
Conservative	Robert Kowal	2,635	3.4	N/A
Conservative	Harry Boeselager	2,449	3.1	N/A
Total votes		78,085	100.0	

New Jersey general election, 1993
Party	Candidate	Votes	%	±%
Republican	Christopher “Kip” Bateman	44,646	32.0	▼1.7
Republican	Walter J. Kavanaugh	43,703	31.3	▼4.2
Democratic	Karen Carroll	26,268	18.8	▲3.1
Democratic	Amedeo F. D’Adamo, Jr.	23,438	16.8	▲1.7
Initiative and Referendum	James N. Carides	1,510	1.1	N/A
Total votes		139,565	100.0	

1991 New Jersey general election
Party	Candidate	Votes	%
Republican	Walter J. Kavanaugh	33,849	35.5
Republican	John S. Penn	32,108	33.7
Democratic	James C. Walker	14,940	15.7
Democratic	Julia Pepe Cino	14,365	15.1
Total votes		95,262	100.0

1989 New Jersey general election
Party	Candidate	Votes	%	±%
Republican	Walter J. Kavanaugh	39,268	32.5	▼3.3
Republican	John S. Penn	37,092	30.7	▼2.8
Democratic	Nicholas F. Cappuccino	22,651	18.7	▲3.2
Democratic	Alfred A. Wicklund	21,799	18.0	▲2.8
Total votes		120,810	100.0	

1987 New Jersey general election
Party	Candidate	Votes	%	±%
Republican	Walter J. Kavanaugh	28,325	35.8	▼3.1
Republican	John S. Penn	26,528	33.5	▼3.0
Democratic	Adele Montgomery	12,249	15.5	▲3.2
Democratic	Alfred A. Wicklund	12,032	15.2	▲3.2
Total votes		79,134	100.0	

1985 New Jersey general election
Party	Candidate	Votes	%	±%
Republican	Walter J. Kavanaugh	37,577	38.9	▲4.5
Republican	John S. Penn	35,258	36.5	▲5.5
Democratic	William R. Norris II	11,884	12.3	▼4.8
Democratic	Frank M. Reskin	11,596	12.0	▼4.3
Libertarian	Stephen Friedlander	363	0.4	▼0.8
Total votes		96,678	100.0	

New Jersey general election, 1983
Party	Candidate	Votes	%	±%
Republican	Walter J. Kavanaugh	27,307	34.4	▼0.3
Republican	John (Jack) Penn	24,627	31.0	▼2.1
Democratic	William R. “Bill” Norris	13,546	17.1	▼0.3
Democratic	Raymond J. Fennimore	12,964	16.3	▲1.6
Libertarian	Stephen M. Friedlander	923	1.2	N/A
Total votes		79,367	100.0	

New Jersey general election, 1981
Party	Candidate	Votes	%
Republican	Walter J. Kavanaugh	39,519	34.7
Republican	Elliott F. Smith	37,660	33.1
Democratic	Thomas H. Dilts	19,834	17.4
Democratic	Kanak Dutta	16,718	14.7
Total votes		113,731	100.0

New Jersey general election, 1979
Party	Candidate	Votes	%	±%
Republican	Walter J. Kavanaugh	26,893	33.2	▲1.2
Republican	Elliott F. Smith	23,996	29.6	▲3.3
Democratic	Robert J. Bukowczyk	14,353	17.7	▼6.2
Democratic	Harry Dreier	13,993	17.3	▼0.5
Kemp-Roth-Bill	Jasper C. Gould	1,736	2.1	N/A
Total votes		80,971	100.0	

New Jersey general election, 1977
Party	Candidate	Votes	%	±%
Republican	Walter J. Kavanaugh	38,516	32.0	▲2.1
Republican	Elliott F. Smith	31,668	26.3	▼3.5
Democratic	Timothy L. Carden	28,692	23.9	▲3.4
Democratic	Peter G. Dowling	21,391	17.8	▼2.0
Total votes		120,267	100.0	

New Jersey general election, 1975
Party	Candidate	Votes	%	±%
Republican	Walter J. Kavanaugh	30,498	29.9	▲2.3
Republican	John H. Ewing	30,337	29.8	▲3.5
Democratic	Edward J. Brady	20,866	20.5	▼4.8
Democratic	Peter G. Dowling	20,219	19.8	▼0.9
Total votes		101,920	100.0	

New Jersey general election, 1973
Party	Candidate	Votes	%
Republican	Victor A. Rizzolo	29,298	27.6
Republican	John H. Ewing	27,864	26.3
Democratic	Michael Imbriani	26,851	25.3
Democratic	Bertha Gillick	21,967	20.7
Total votes		105,980	100.0
