= 1990 United States Senate election in New Jersey =

- November 6, 1990
- Turnout: 54% (▼25pp)
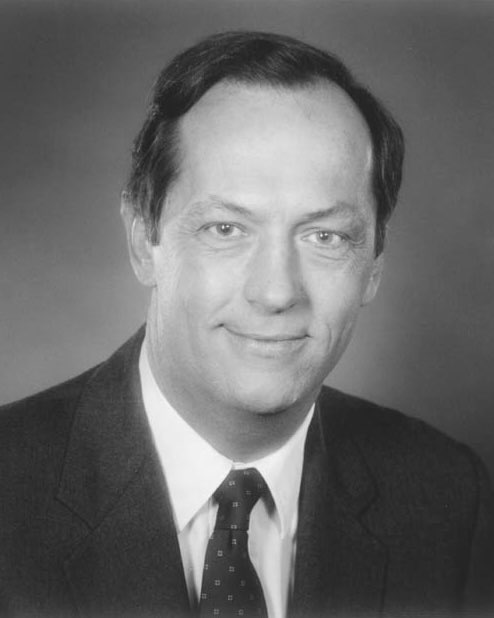

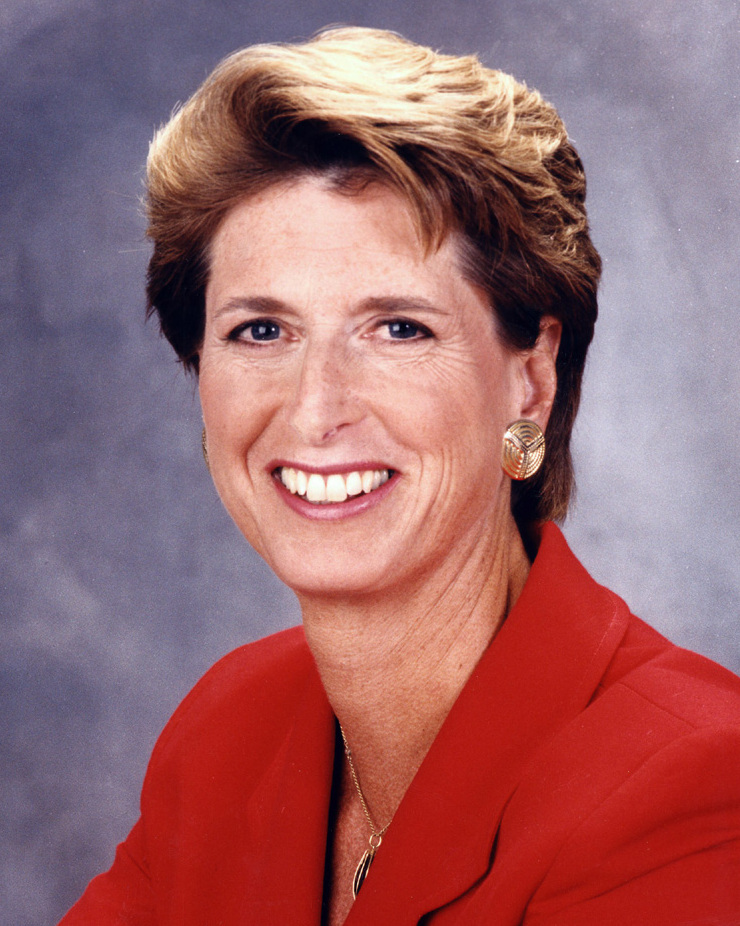
Nominee	Bill Bradley	Christine Todd Whitman
Party	Democratic	Republican
Popular vote	977,810	918,874
Percentage	50.44%	47.40%
- Bradley: 40–50% 50–60% 60–70% 80–90% Whitman: 40–50% 50–60% 60–70%
U.S. senator before election
Bill Bradley
Democratic
Elected U.S. Senator
Bill Bradley
Democratic

The 1990 New Jersey United States Senate election was held on November 6, 1990. Democratic incumbent Bill Bradley was narrowly re-elected to a third term in office over little-known Republican Christine Todd Whitman. Whitman came surprisingly close to defeating the popular Bradley, and her overperformance in this election set her up to run for governor of New Jersey in 1993.

== Democratic primary ==
=== Candidates ===
- Bill Bradley, incumbent U.S. senator since 1979
- Daniel Z. Seyler, Phillipsburg resident

=== Results ===
1990 Democratic U.S. Senate primary
Party	Candidate	Votes	%
Democratic	Bill Bradley (incumbent)	197,454	92.38%
Democratic	Daniel Z. Seyler	16,287	7.62%
Total votes		213,741	100.00%

== Republican primary ==
=== Candidates ===
- Christine Todd Whitman, president of the New Jersey Board of Public Utilities and former Somerset County freeholder (1983–88)

==== Declined ====
- Leanna Brown, state senator from Chatham

=== Campaign ===
The New Jersey Republican Party struggled to recruit a candidate to oppose Bradley, a widely popular incumbent with financial resources in a state that had not elected a Republican to the Senate since 1972, although incumbent Republican President George H. W. Bush had carried the state by a wide margin in 1988 and remained highly popular. The two most commonly mentioned candidates were Christine Todd Whitman, the president of the state board of public utilities, and State Senator Leanna Brown, who had raised her profile through her involvement in Jim Courter's 1989 gubernatorial campaign. Brown removed herself from consideration on February 24, leaving Whitman as the likely nominee.

Bradley was expected to outspend the Republican nominee four-to-one and even Whitman admitted that the goal of the Republican campaign was not winning, but rather "show[ing] there are good credible candidates... to show there is life after Tom Kean." Whitman, the daughter of former party chair Webster B. Todd, resigned from the public utilities board on March 5 and announced she would face Bradley with the support of the state party on March 13. In doing so, Whitman passed up the opportunity to run for an open U.S. House seat vacated by Jim Courter. Acknowledging the uphill battle Whitman faced, Somerset party chair Jack Penn compared her odds to those of Buster Douglas, a 42:1 underdog who had knocked out Mike Tyson one month earlier.

=== Results ===
1990 Republican U.S. Senate primary
Party	Candidate	Votes	%
Republican	Christine Todd Whitman	112,214	100.00%
Total votes		112,214	100.00%

== General election ==
=== Candidates ===
- Bill Bradley, incumbent U.S. senator since 1979 (Democratic)
- John Kucek (Populist)
- Don Mackle (Socialist Workers)
- Louis Stefanelli (Libertarian)
- Christine Todd Whitman, president of the New Jersey Board of Public Utilities (Republican)

=== Campaign ===
U.S. Senator Bill Bradley didn't realize he was in danger of losing re-election and the New Jersey voters' anger over taxes and economy until the week prior to the election.

In the early part of the campaign, Bradley already had a major image problem; he was comfortably ahead in the polls, so his staffers told him to play it safe. He aired television advertisements of himself walking on the beach, shooting a perfect shot on the court, and sitting back in his office with his basketball shoes on his desk. The advertisements backfired as voters were turned off and thought that he wasn't taking his job seriously, especially at a time when voters were suffering.

Another major problem with Bradley was how Democratic Governor Jim Florio implemented a $2.8 billion tax increase, hurting the state's economy. In addition, Bradley refused to answer questions pertaining to Florio's tax policies.

After Bradley realized he was in trouble, he released negative advertisements attacking Whitman's own record on taxes, accusing her of favoring tax increases when she was a Somerset County Freeholder. Bradley's image may have been further damaged by his newer advertisements.

=== Polling ===
Poll source	Date(s) administered	Sample size (Note: Key: A – all adults RV – registered voters LV – likely voters PV – "probable" voters)	Margin of error	Bill Bradley (D)	Christine Whitman (R)	Other/ Undecided
Rutgers-Eagleton	July 2–10, 1990	616 LV	±4.0%	64%	17%	19%
Rutgers-Eagleton	Sep. 24–Oct. 2, 1990	613 LV	±4.0%	56%	26%	18%
Rutgers-Eagleton	October 16–22, 1990	532 LV	±4.5%	62%	26%	12%
Rutgers-Eagleton	October 27–31, 1990	987 LV	±3.2%	55%	27%	18%
Rutgers-Eagleton	October 27–31, 1990	466 PV	±4.5%	50%	33%	17%

=== Results ===
1990 United States Senate election in New Jersey
Party	Candidate	Votes	%	±%
Democratic	Bill Bradley (incumbent)	977,810	50.44%	−13.72%
Republican	Christine Todd Whitman	918,874	47.40%	+12.52%
Populist	John Kucek	19,978	1.03%	N/A
Libertarian	Louis Stefanelli	13,988	0.72%	+0.49%
Socialist Workers	Don Mackle	7,804	0.40%	+0.30%
Total votes		1,938,454	100.0%	
Democratic hold		Swing		

==== Results by county ====

County	Bradley #	Bradley %	Whitman #	Whitman %	All Others #	All Others %
Atlantic	27.905	58.08%	19,481	40.54%	662	1.38%
Bergen	121,020	49.24%	121,600	49.47%	3,180	1.29%
Burlington	46,912	49.33%	46,287	48.67%	1,901	2.00%
Camden	72,328	56.78%	52,790	41.44%	2,263	1.78%
Cape May	16,627	54.11%	13,528	44.02%	573	1.86%
Cumberland	18,186	56.82%	12,765	39.89%	1,053	3.29%
Essex	93,052	61.09%	56,722	37.24%	2,539	1.67%
Gloucester	35,379	57.01%	25,374	40.89%	1,307	2.11%
Hudson	65,242	65.62%	32,311	32.50%	1,877	1.89%
Hunterdon	10,849	36.11%	18,309	60.94%	886	2.95%
Mercer	45,036	52.28%	39,570	45.94%	1,535	1.78%
Middlesex	80,080	49.49%	77,165	47.69%	4,553	2.81%
Monmouth	74,934	47.62%	80,126	50.92%	2,298	1.46%
Morris	46,928	40.71%	66,369	57.57%	1,983	1.72%
Ocean	54,714	39.90%	76,948	56.12%	5,547	3.98%
Passaic	40,312	46.58%	43,867	50.69%	2,357	2.72%
Salem	10,086	53.99%	7,999	42.82%	596	3.19%
Somerset	27,508	40.30%	38,426	56.30%	2,320	3.40%
Sussex	12.814	38.45%	19,789	59.37%	726	2.18%
Union	66,716	52.11%	57,628	45.38%	3,184	2.51%
Warren	11,722	48.72%	11,820	49.12%	520	2.16%

Counties that flipped from Democratic to Republican

- Bergen
- Hunterdon
- Monmouth
- Morris
- Ocean
- Passaic
- Somerset
- Sussex
- Warren

== See also ==
- 1990 United States Senate elections
