= Kip Bateman =

American Republican Party politician

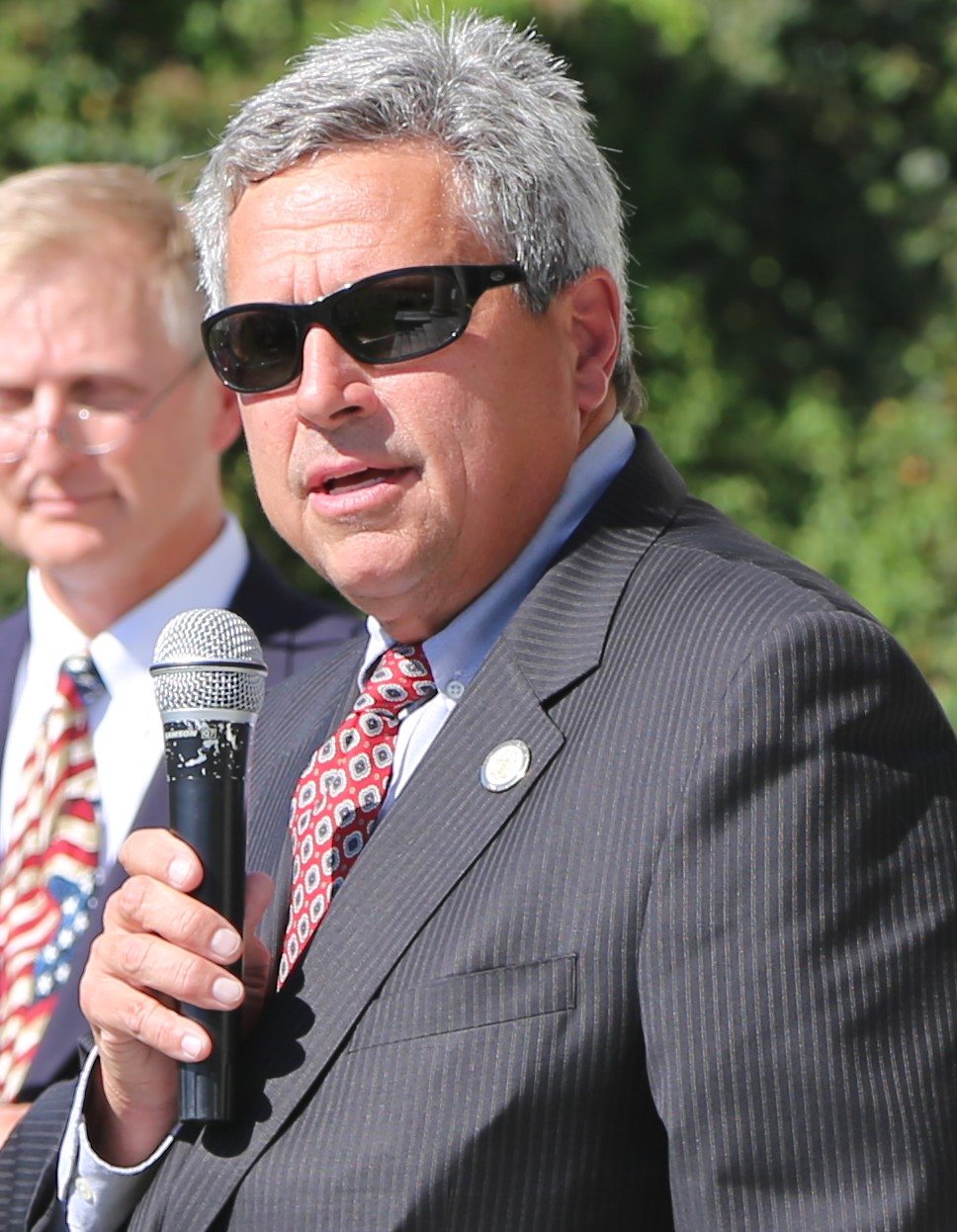

Member of the New Jersey Senate from the 16th district
- In office January 8, 2008 – January 11, 2022
- Preceded by: Walter J. Kavanaugh
- Succeeded by: Andrew Zwicker

Member of the New Jersey General Assembly from the 16th district
- In office January 11, 1994 – January 8, 2008
- Preceded by: John S. Penn
- Succeeded by: Denise Coyle

Personal details
- Born: October 9, 1957 (age 68) Somerville, New Jersey, U.S.
- Party: Republican
- Spouse: Susan Bateman
- Education: Ithaca College (BA); Seton Hall University (JD)
- Occupation: Attorney

Christopher "Kip" Bateman (born October 9, 1957) is an American Republican Party politician, who served in the New Jersey Senate from 2008 to 2022, representing the 16th Legislative District. He previously served in the New Jersey General Assembly from 1994 to 2008, also in the 16th district.

== Personal life ==
He was born in Somerville, New Jersey to Raymond Bateman, who represented the 16th district in the New Jersey Senate in the 1960s and 1970s, and was the Republican candidate for Governor of New Jersey in 1977, losing to incumbent Brendan Byrne. Bateman graduated from Somerville High School, and received a B.A. in 1980 from Ithaca College in Political Science and History and was awarded a J.D. in 1987 from the Seton Hall University School of Law. He lives in the Neshanic Station section of Branchburg Township, and is married with four children: Chris, Joe, Stephanie, and Katie.

== Political career ==
=== Somerset County politics ===
Bateman served on the Branchburg Township Committee from 1983 to 1988 and was its Mayor in 1986. He then served on the Somerset County Board of Chosen Freeholders from 1988 to 1994 and was its Director in 1992. After being elected to the New Jersey General Assembly, Bateman was appointed to the Task Force to Study Homeowner Associations from 1996 to 1997 and the Delaware and Raritan Transportation Safety Study Commission from 1995 to 1996.

=== New Jersey State Assembly ===
Bateman served in the New Jersey General Assembly from 1994 to 2008, where he was the Assembly's Assistant Republican Leader from 2004 to 2005, was the Assistant Republican Whip from 2002 to 2003, the Majority Whip in 1996 and was the Assistant Majority Whip from 1994 to 1995. Bateman served in the Assembly on the Commerce and Economic Development Committee, the Financial Institutions and Insurance Committee and the Legislative Services Commission.

=== New Jersey State Senate ===
In the 2007 legislative elections, Bateman won the State Senate seat of retiring Senator Walter J. Kavanaugh. Prior to the 2011 redistricting, the 16th district consisted of most of Somerset County. Following the 2011 redistricting, towns in northern and eastern parts of Somerset (including Bridgewater) were removed, and were replaced by a portion of Hunterdon County, and the Democratic towns of South Brunswick and Princeton. This made the 16th district a swing district. He fended off a challenge by Democrat Maureen Vella by defeating her by 9 points in 2011. His 2013 election winning margin was larger as he defeated Christian Mastondrea by 20 points.

During the 2019 budget fight, Democrats defied Governor Phil Murphy and passed a budget without his proposed millionaire's tax. Bateman was one of six Republicans to vote for the budget.

On January 27, 2021, Bateman announced that he would be retiring and not run for re-election to the State Senate in 2021.

Bateman is a moderate Republican. He has been known to break with his party and vote with Democrats on environmental issues, as he is a believer in climate change. In addition, in each of his elections to the state legislature, Bateman received the endorsement of New Jersey environmental activist and New Jersey Sierra Club director Jeff Tittel, one of few Republicans that he has endorsed. Tittel and the Sierra Club awarded Bateman their Lifetime Achievement Award in 2012.

=== Committees ===
- Environment and Energy
- Judiciary

== Electoral history ==
=== Senate ===
2017 New Jersey State Senate election
Party	Candidate	Votes	%	±%
Republican	Kip Bateman (incumbent)	32,229	50.4	▼9.9
Democratic	Laurie Poppe	31,655	49.6	▲9.9
Total votes		'63,884'	'100.0'	
Republican hold				

2013 New Jersey State Senate election
Party	Candidate	Votes	%
Republican	Kip Bateman (incumbent)	34,865	60.3
Democratic	Christian Mastondrea	22,990	39.7
Republican hold			

2011 New Jersey State Senate election
Party	Candidate	Votes	%
Republican	Kip Bateman (incumbent)	21,040	54.6
Democratic	Maureen Vella	17,460	43.4
Republican hold			

2007 New Jersey State Senate election
Party	Candidate	Votes	%
Republican	Kip Bateman	27,846	61.6
Democratic	Wayne G. Fox	17,378	38.4
Republican hold			

=== Assembly ===
2005 New Jersey General Assembly election
Party	Candidate	Votes	%	±%
Republican	Kip Bateman	40,097	32.2	▼6.3
Republican	Pete Biondi	39,710	31.8	▼7.2
Democratic	Michael Goldberg	22,569	18.1	▲0.3
Democratic	Charles Eader	22,336	17.9	N/A
Total votes		'124,712'	'100.0'	

2003 New Jersey General Assembly election
Party	Candidate	Votes	%	±%
Republican	Pete Biondi	26,211	39.0	▲6.4
Republican	Kip Bateman	25,849	38.5	▲4.7
Democratic	Robert Mack	11,938	17.8	▲0.5
Green	Jane Hunter	3,219	4.8	N/A
Total votes		'67,217'	'100.0'	

2001 New Jersey General Assembly election
Party	Candidate	Votes	%
Republican	Kip Bateman	39,136	33.8
Republican	Pete Biondi	37,788	32.6
Democratic	John P. Rooney	20,051	17.3
Democratic	James K. Foohey	18,948	16.3
Total votes		115,923	100.0

1999 New Jersey General Assembly election
Party	Candidate	Votes	%	±%
Republican	Kip Bateman	24,646	31.2	▼0.6
Republican	Pete Biondi	23,789	30.2	▲0.2
Democratic	Mike Alper	15,393	19.5	▲2.0
Democratic	Donald Rudy	15,060	19.1	▲2.3
Total votes		'78,888'	'100.0'	

1997 New Jersey General Assembly election
Party	Candidate	Votes	%	±%
Republican	Kip Bateman	43,458	31.8	▲3.1
Republican	Pete Biondi	41,008	30.0	▲1.4
Democratic	Amedeo D'Adamo Jr.	23,920	17.5	▼1.3
Democratic	Harold Weber	22,921	16.8	▼0.6
Conservative	Robert Kowal	2,758	2.0	▼1.4
Conservative	Howard Manella	2,432	1.8	▼1.3
Total votes		'136,497'	'100.0'	

1995 New Jersey General Assembly election
Party	Candidate	Votes	%	±%
Republican	Kip Bateman	22,406	28.7	▼3.3
Republican	Walter J. Kavanaugh	22,359	28.6	▼2.7
Democratic	Joseph Tricarico Jr.	14,683	18.8	0.0
Democratic	Mitchell E. Ignatoff Jr.	13,553	17.4	▲0.6
Conservative	Robert Kowal	2,635	3.4	N/A
Conservative	Harry Boeselager	2,449	3.1	N/A
Total votes		'78,085'	'100.0'	

1993 New Jersey General Assembly election
Party	Candidate	Votes	%	±%
Republican	Kip Bateman	44,646	32.0	▼1.7
Republican	Walter J. Kavanaugh	43,703	31.3	▼4.2
Democratic	Karen Carroll	26,268	18.8	▲3.1
Democratic	Amedeo F. D'Adamo Jr.	23,438	16.8	▲1.7
Initiative and Referendum	James N. Carides	1,510	1.1	N/A
Total votes		'139,565'	'100.0'	

New Jersey Senate
Preceded by Walter J. Kavanaugh	Member of the New Jersey Senate for the 16th District; January 8, 2008 – January 11, 2022	Succeeded by Andrew Zwicker
New Jersey General Assembly
Preceded by John S. Penn	Member of the New Jersey General Assembly for the 16th District; January 11, 1994 – January 8, 2008; With: Walter J. Kavanaugh, Peter J. Biondi	Succeeded by Denise Coyle
