= Victor A. Rizzolo =

American politician

Member of the New Jersey General Assembly
- In office February 1, 1973 – January 13, 1976
- Preceded by: Millicent Fenwick
- Succeeded by: Walter J. Kavanaugh
- Constituency: 8th district (1973–1974); 16th district (1974–1976)

Personal details
- Born: December 30, 1923 Newark, New Jersey
- Died: November 11, 2017 (aged 93) Lyons, New Jersey
- Party: Republican

Victor A. Rizzolo (December 30, 1923 – November 11, 2017) was an American politician who served in the New Jersey General Assembly from 1973 to 1976.

Born and raised in Newark, New Jersey, he graduated from Barringer High School in 1941, before serving with the United States Army in Europe during World War II.

After Millicent Fenwick resigned from her Assembly seat on December 14, 1972, to become head of the New Jersey Division of Consumer Affairs, Rizzolo won a special election on January 30, 1973, to complete her term representing the 8th Legislative District.

He died on November 11, 2017, in Lyons, New Jersey at age 93.

New Jersey General Assembly
Preceded by Millicent Fenwick	Member of the New Jersey General Assembly from the 8th district February 1, 1973–January 8, 1974	Succeeded by District abolished
Preceded by District created	Member of the New Jersey General Assembly from the 16th district January 8, 1974–January 13, 1976	Succeeded by Walter J. Kavanaugh
