= Walter J. Kavanaugh =

American politician (1933–2008)

Member of the New Jersey Senate from the 16th district
- In office January 13, 1998 – January 8, 2008
- Preceded by: John H. Ewing
- Succeeded by: Kip Bateman

Member of the New Jersey General Assembly from the 16th district
- In office January 13, 1976 – January 13, 1998 Serving with John H. Ewing, Elliott F. Smith, John S. Penn and Christopher Bateman
- Preceded by: Victor A. Rizzolo
- Succeeded by: Peter J. Biondi

Personal details
- Born: June 30, 1933 Bound Brook, New Jersey
- Died: January 9, 2008 (aged 74) Somerville, New Jersey
- Party: Republican
- Education: University of Notre Dame (BSc)

Walter J. Kavanaugh (June 30, 1933 – January 9, 2008) was an American Republican Party politician, who served in the New Jersey Legislature for 32 years, representing the 16th Legislative District. He died just two days after leaving the State Senate, having declined to run for re-election in 2007. His 32 years of service in the legislature made him the seventh-longest serving legislator in state history.

== Education ==
Kavanaugh received a B.S.C. from the University of Notre Dame in Marketing.

== Career ==
Kavanaugh had served in the State Senate since 1998, where he represented the 16th Legislative District. Senator Kavanaugh served on the Budget & Appropriations Committee and was Vice Chair of the Intergovernmental Relations Commission. Before being elected to the Senate, Kavanaugh served in the lower house of the New Jersey Legislature, the General Assembly, from 1976 to 1997. In the Assembly, Kavanaugh served as the Majority Budget Officer from 1996 to 1997, Deputy Speaker from 1994 to 1995, Assistant Majority Leader from 1986 to 1989, Assistant Minority Leader in 1985, Deputy Assistant Minority Leader from 1980 to 1981, Minority Whip from 1978 to 1979 and as Assistant Minority Whip in 1977.

Kavanaugh had been a member of the Somerville First Aid and Rescue Squad since 1968. He had served on the State House Commission since 1998 and also from 1990 to 1994. He was a trustee of the Somerville Public Schools Board of Education from 1962 to 1975, serving as its President from 1967 to 1975. He was on the Somerset County Park Commission 1968-1975. Kavanaugh served in the United States Air Force from 1955 to 1976, reaching the rank of Lieutenant.

== Death ==
After Kavanaugh's death on January 9, 2008, Governor of New Jersey Jon Corzine issued an executive order requiring that flags be flown at half staff in his memory on January 14, 2008, at all state and local government facilities across New Jersey.

== District 16 ==
Each of the forty districts in the New Jersey Legislature has one representative in the New Jersey Senate and two members in the New Jersey General Assembly. The other representatives from the 16th Legislative District for the 2006-2008 legislative session were:

- Assemblyman Christopher Bateman, and
- Assemblyman Peter J. Biondi

New Jersey General Assembly
Preceded by Victor A. Rizzolo	Member of the New Jersey General Assembly from the 16th district January 13, 1976–January 13, 1998; Served alongside: John H. Ewing, Elliott F. Smith, John S. Penn and Christopher Bateman	Succeeded by Peter J. Biondi
New Jersey Senate
Preceded by John H. Ewing	Member of the New Jersey Senate from the 16th district January 13, 1998–January 8, 2008	Succeeded by Kip Bateman
