= Peter J. Biondi =

American politician (1942–2011)

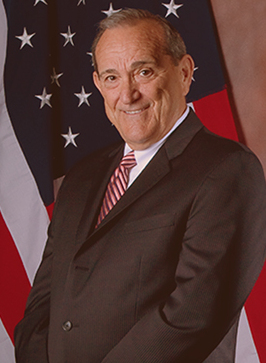
- Official portrait, 2009

Member of the New Jersey General Assembly from the 16th district
- In office January 13, 1998 – November 10, 2011 Serving with Kip Bateman (1998–2008); Denise Coyle (2008–2011)
- Preceded by: Walter J. Kavanaugh
- Succeeded by: Jack Ciattarelli

Personal details
- Born: June 23, 1942 Newark, New Jersey, U.S.
- Died: November 10, 2011 (aged 69) Somerville, New Jersey, U.S.
- Party: Republican

Peter J. "Pete" Biondi (June 23, 1942 – November 10, 2011) was an American Republican Party politician who served in the New Jersey General Assembly from 1998 until his death in 2011, where he represented the 16th Legislative District.

== Early life ==
Biondi was born in Newark, New Jersey. He graduated from Union High School.

== Career ==
Biondi served on the Somerset County Youth Services Commission from 1996 until his death and as its Co-Chair in 1997. He served on the Hillsborough Township Planning Board from 1986 to 1999, served on the Hillsborough Township Committee from 1983 to 1993, served as the Township's Deputy Mayor in 1985 and as its Mayor from 1986 to 1993. Biondi served on the Somerset County Board of Chosen Freeholders from 1994 to 1997, was its Director in 1996 and its Deputy Director in 1995. He served on the Industrial Pollution Control Financing Authority in 1997. Biondi was a member of the Somerset County Planning Board from 1994 to 1996. Biondi served in the United States Army Reserve from 1961 to 1967.

He served as the Republican Conference Leader starting in 2006 and was the Assembly's Assistant Republican Leader from 2002 to 2003. Biondi served in the Assembly on the Regulated Professions Committee, the Intergovernmental Relations Commission and the Legislative Services Commission.

Biondi introduced a bill in the 2006 legislative session which would require operators of all "public forum websites" to gather the full names and addresses of all persons posting on such websites, and turn such information over to anyone claiming the posting of "false or defamatory information", with the penalty for failure to comply being liability for lawsuits relating to the posting of the information (under libel laws). The requirement is specifically on any ISP or similar entity doing business in New Jersey to require anyone using said entity's facilities for website posting to gather and make available said information. News of this bill has reached outlets as widely read as Slashdot on March 6, 2006.

== Death and legacy ==
In October 2011, Biondi publicly disclosed that he had been diagnosed with non-Hodgkin lymphoma about one year earlier, and that he had undergone chemotherapy and believed the disease was in remission. On election day, November 8, 2011, Biondi was re-elected to what would have been his eighth term in the Assembly. Jack Ciattarelli concurrently won District 16’s other Assembly seat. Biondi died two days later at the age of 69.

After Biondi’s death, Ciattarelli was sworn in on December 5, 2011 to finish Biondi’s unexpired term ending January 10, 2012. Biondi’s seat was then vacant again until Donna Simon was sworn in on January 30, 2012 as an interim appointee pending a November 2012 special election where she won.

In 2013, New Jersey governor Chris Christie memorialized Biondi, signing a law naming a new bypass section of U.S. Route 206 in Hillsborough as the "Peter J. Biondi Bypass."
