= Raymond Bateman =

American politician (1927–2016)

Raymond H. Bateman

President of the New Jersey Senate
- In office January 13, 1970 – January 11, 1972
- Preceded by: Frank X. McDermott
- Succeeded by: Alfred N. Beadleston

Member of the New Jersey Senate
- In office January 9, 1968 – January 10, 1978
- Preceded by: William E. Ozzard
- Succeeded by: John H. Ewing
- Constituency: 8th district (1968–1974); 16th district (1974–1978)

Member of the New Jersey General Assembly from the Somerset County district
- In office November 1958 – January 9, 1968
- Preceded by: William E. Ozzard
- Succeeded by: District eliminated

Personal details
- Born: October 29, 1927 Somerville, New Jersey, U.S.
- Died: June 25, 2016 (aged 88) Morristown, New Jersey, U.S.
- Resting place: North Branch Reformed Church Cemetery
- Party: Republican
- Spouse: Joan Speer Bateman (m. ?–2003) (her death)
- Children: Five, including Christopher
- Education: Wesleyan University

Raymond H. Bateman (October 29, 1927 – June 25, 2016) was an American politician who represented Somerset County in the New Jersey Senate in the 1960s and 1970s and was the Republican candidate for Governor of New Jersey in 1977. He was the father of Kip Bateman, who later occupied the same Senate district he held.

== Biography ==
=== Early life, education and military service ===
Bateman was born on October 29, 1927, in Somerville, New Jersey and was a lifelong resident of Somerset County, where he graduated from Somerville High School in 1945. In 1946, he joined the United States Army and was stationed at the Eighth Army headquarters in Yokohama during the Occupation of Japan after World War II. In 1947, he was promoted to staff sergeant. After military service, he attended Wesleyan University, where he graduated in 1950, and attended the graduate program at the Woodrow Wilson School of Public and International Affairs.

=== Political career ===
He served as executive director of the Republican State Committee from 1954 to 1958. He entered the New Jersey General Assembly in November 1958, serving as the lone Assemblyman from Somerset County (at the time, Assembly districts were apportioned by counties' populations) going on to serve as assistant majority leader in 1964 and majority leader in 1965. Bateman sponsored the 1962 legislation that established New Jersey's county-based community college system. He was elected to the New Jersey Senate in 1967 and was reelected in 1971 from the 8th Legislative District which consisted of all of Somerset County. He served as assistant majority leader in 1968, majority leader in 1969, and Senate president and acting governor in 1970–1972. In 1973, following the reconfiguration of all legislative districts, he was elected to serve in the Senate from the 16th District consisting of most of Somerset County and portions of Hunterdon and Morris counties.

In 1977 Bateman won the Republican primary for Governor of New Jersey over Thomas Kean and two other candidates, but he lost in the general election to Brendan Byrne by a margin of 1,184,564 to 888,880 votes.

Bateman served as chairman of the New Jersey Sports and Exposition Authority. He resigned after a conflict with Governor of New Jersey Donald DiFrancesco in 2001 over construction of a new arena for the New Jersey Devils in Newark and plans for the proposed Xanadu complex.

=== Personal life ===
He was married to Joan Speer Bateman until her death in 2003. They had five children: Caren, Raymond Jr. (a luger in the 1980 and 1984 Olympics, died 1990), Christopher, Michael, and Joan Anne. He died on June 25, 2016, at Morristown Memorial Hospital after a shoulder break and pneumonia. He is buried at the North Branch Reformed Church cemetery.

== See also ==
- Politics of New Jersey

New Jersey General Assembly
Preceded by William E. Ozzard	Member of the New Jersey General Assembly from the Somerset County district November 1958–January 9, 1968	Succeeded by District eliminated
New Jersey Senate
Preceded by William E. Ozzard	Member of the New Jersey Senate from the 8th district January 9, 1968–January 8, 1974	Succeeded by District eliminated
Preceded by District created	Member of the New Jersey Senate from the 16th district January 8, 1974–January 10, 1978	Succeeded by John H. Ewing
Preceded by Frank X. McDermott	President of the New Jersey Senate; 1970–1972	Succeeded by Alfred N. Beadleston
Party political offices
Preceded by Charles Sandman	Republican nominee for Governor of New Jersey; 1977	Succeeded by Thomas Kean
