= John S. Penn =

American politician

Member of the New Jersey General Assembly from the 16th district
- In office January 10, 1984 – January 11, 1994 Serving with Walter J. Kavanaugh
- Preceded by: Elliott F. Smith
- Succeeded by: Christopher Bateman

Personal details
- Born: November 19, 1926 New York City, New York
- Died: November 1, 2013 (aged 86) Basking Ridge, New Jersey
- Party: Republican

John Stanton Penn (November 19, 1926 - November 1, 2013) was an American politician who served in the New Jersey General Assembly from the 16th Legislative District from 1984 to 1994.

Born in Brooklyn and raised in Westfield, New Jersey. Penn attended the Wardlaw School (since renamed as the Wardlaw-Hartridge School) and Columbia College. He resided in Far Hills, New Jersey and lived in Bedminster, New Jersey at the time of his death.

New Jersey General Assembly
Preceded by Elliott F. Smith	Member of the New Jersey General Assembly from the 16th district January 10, 1984–January 11, 1994; Served alongside: Walter J. Kavanaugh	Succeeded by Kip Bateman
