= Jack Ciattarelli =

American politician (born 1961)

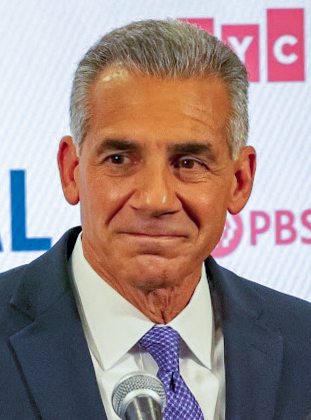
- Ciattarelli in 2021

Member of the New Jersey General Assembly from the 16th district
- In office December 5, 2011 – January 9, 2018
- Preceded by: Peter J. Biondi
- Succeeded by: Roy Freiman

Member of the Somerset County Board of Chosen Freeholders
- In office January 1, 2007 – November 23, 2011
- Preceded by: Ken Scherer
- Succeeded by: Mark Caliguire

Personal details
- Born: Giacchino Michael Ciattarelli; December 12, 1961 (age 64) Somerville, New Jersey, U.S.
- Party: Republican
- Spouse: Melinda Castro (m. 1995; div. 2025)
- Children: 4
- Education: Seton Hall University (BS, MBA)
- Website: Campaign website

Giacchino Michael "Jack" Ciattarelli (/ˌtʃɪtəˈrɛli/ CHIT-ə-REL-ee; born December 12, 1961) is an American businessman and politician. A member of the Republican Party, he represented the 16th legislative district in the New Jersey General Assembly from 2011 to 2018.

Ciattarelli was the Republican nominee for governor of New Jersey in 2021 and 2025, narrowly losing the 2021 election to incumbent Phil Murphy and the 2025 election by a wide margin to Mikie Sherrill, despite polls showing a close race. He also ran in 2017, but lost the primary to Kim Guadagno, who lost the general election to Murphy.

== Early life and education ==
Ciattarelli was born in Somerville, New Jersey on December 12, 1961, and was raised in neighboring Raritan. His paternal grandparents had immigrated to Raritan borough in the 1900s from Valentano, Lazio, Italy. He graduated from Seton Hall University with a degree in accounting and certification in public accounting.

== Business career ==
Ciattarelli is the former owner and publisher of American Medical Publishing and later of Galen Publishing, also a medical publishing company. He has worked as a certified public accountant and was the co-founder of several medical journal publishing companies. He was also an adjunct professor at Seton Hall from 1998 to 2001.

== Political career ==
=== Raritan Borough Council (1990–1995) ===
Ciattarelli served on the Raritan Borough Council from 1990 to 1995 and was the council president from 1991 until 1995. Ciattarelli chose not to seek re-election in 1995.

=== Somerset County Board of Freeholders (2007–2011) ===
After 10 years away from politics, Ciattarelli was elected to the Somerset County Board of Freeholders. He served on the Board of Freeholders from 2007 to November 2011.

=== New Jersey General Assembly (2011–2018) ===
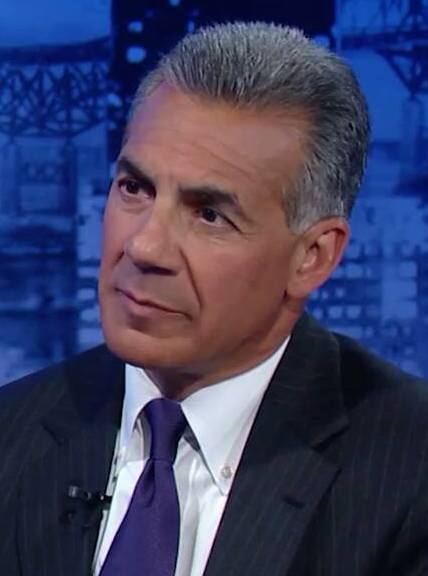
Ciattarelli in 2016

In 2011, Ciattarelli ran for the open General Assembly seat in the 16th legislative district, vacated by Denise Coyle, who chose not to run for re-election due to redistricting. On November 8, 2011, he and his running mate Peter J. Biondi defeated the Democratic candidates, Marie Corfield and Joe Camarota. Each of New Jersey's 40 state legislative districts has one Senator and two members in the General Assembly. Biondi died two days after the election. After stepping down from his freeholder position, Ciattarelli was sworn in on December 5, 2011, to complete Biondi's unexpired term, and was sworn in for his first full term on January 10, 2012. He served on the Financial Institutions and Insurance and the Regulated Professions committees in the Assembly. He had previously served as an assistant Republican Whip.

Ciattarelli chose not to seek for re-election in 2017 to instead run for governor. His term in the General Assembly ended on January 9, 2018.

=== New Jersey gubernatorial campaigns ===
==== 2017 gubernatorial election ====
In 2017, Ciattarelli ran for governor of New Jersey and lost the Republican primary receiving 31% of the vote. Lieutenant Governor Kim Guadagno won the primary with 47% of the vote.

==== 2021 gubernatorial election ====
In 2021, Ciattarelli ran for governor of New Jersey again. This time, he won the Republican primary receiving 49% of the vote. Although Ciattarelli outperformed expectations, he lost the general election to incumbent governor Phil Murphy, receiving 48.0% of the vote to Murphy's 51.2%. Ciattarelli conceded the race to Murphy on November 12, 2021.

==== 2025 gubernatorial election ====
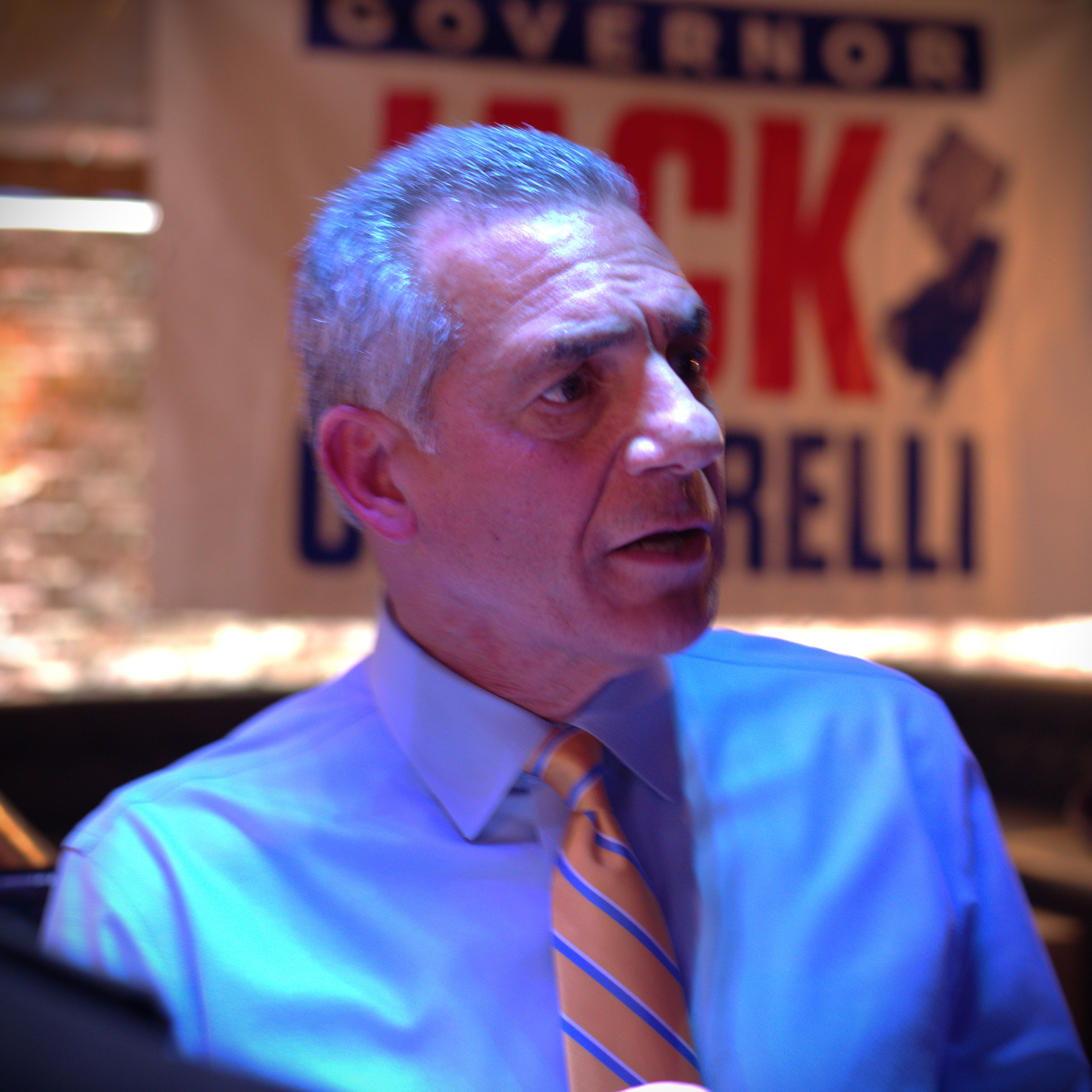
Ciattarelli campaigning in Morristown, New Jersey

A resident of Hillsborough Township, New Jersey, Ciattarelli was the Republican nominee in the 2025 New Jersey gubernatorial election. He was endorsed by President Donald Trump in the Republican primary, and won the contest on June 10 with approximately 68% of the vote.

Ciattarelli faced Democratic U.S. Representative Mikie Sherrill in the 2025 general election.

During his campaign, Ciattarelli invited Benny Johnson and Jack Posobiec to speak at his campaign rally in Wildwood, New Jersey. During the rally, Posobiec called for the United States Department of Justice to prosecute critics of Donald Trump. Ciattarelli additionally campaigned alongside an anti-vaccine activist, and espoused positions closer to that of the MAGA movement than in his previous campaigns for governor.

Ciattarelli lost the general election to Sherrill on November 4, 2025, receiving 42.5% of the vote to Sherrill's 56.9% and conceded the race that evening.

== Political positions ==
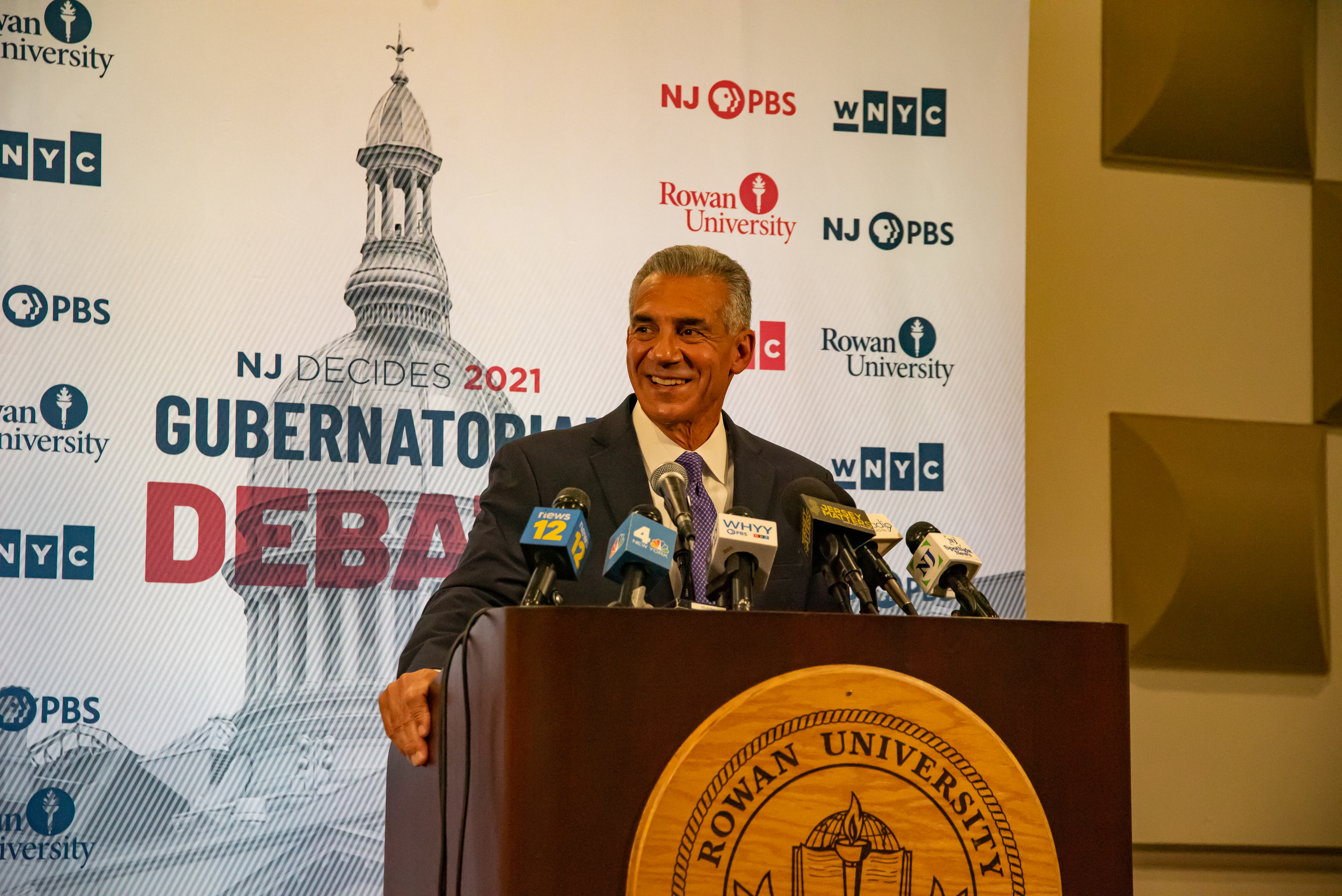
Ciattarelli speaks to the press following the second gubernatorial debate at Rowan University on October 12, 2021

=== Abortion ===
Ciattarelli has said he supports banning abortion after 20 weeks of pregnancy (except in cases where the patient's life is in danger), and did not support overturning Roe v. Wade, the landmark Supreme Court ruling which conferred the constitutional right to abortion.

=== Donald Trump ===
Ciattarelli called Donald Trump a "charlatan" in 2015, but in ensuing years supported Trump's 2020 reelection bid. After the 2020 U.S. presidential election, Ciattarelli headlined a "Stop the Steal" rally, an event where speakers claimed that the 2020 election had been stolen from then-President Trump. Ciattarelli said he was unaware it was a Stop the Steal rally until after the fact. Ciattarelli endorsed Trump in the 2024 election. Trump in turn endorsed him in the 2025 election. Prior to this endorsement his main primary challenger, Bill Spadea, attacked him as a RINO due to his previous anti-Trump comments. In 2025, Ciattarelli said he would rate Trump's performance in his second term as an "A".

=== Immigration ===
On immigration, he reversed his opposition to drivers' licenses being issued to undocumented immigrants, saying he now supports access to drivers' licenses.

=== LGBTQ issues ===
In 2012, Ciattarelli voted against a bill legalizing same-sex marriage. He has also voted to ban conversion therapy for minors.

In 2021, he expressed opposition to New Jersey laws regarding LGBTQ education, saying, "We're not teaching sodomy in sixth grade. And we're going to roll back the LGBTQ curriculum." Following criticism for his use of the term "sodomy", Ciattarelli clarified he had not meant the word in regard to "someone's sexual orientation", but was referring to "mature content being taught to young children"; he added that "all schools should be promoting diversity, inclusivity, tolerance, and respect for others, but that doesn't mean pushing explicit subjects in elementary school classrooms". In his platform, Ciattarelli stated that he wished to "reform requirements for sexual and social education to make content less dogmatic and more age-appropriate for elementary and middle school-aged children".

At an October 2025 rally, an unpaid adviser to Ciattarelli's gubernatorial campaign asserted that Ciattarelli would attempt to roll back same-sex marriage in New Jersey if he were elected. After these remarks created a controversy, Ciattarelli took to social media to express his support for same-sex marriage.

== Personal life ==
Ciattarelli was married to Melinda Ciattarelli and has four adult children. In June 2023, Ciattarelli announced that he and Melinda had separated earlier in the year. They divorced in 2025.

Ciattarelli was diagnosed with throat cancer in 2016 and revealed that he was cancer-free in March 2017.

Party political offices
| Preceded by Kim Guadagno | Republican nominee for Governor of New Jersey; 2021, 2025 | Most recent |
