= 2011 New Jersey Senate election =

2011 New Jersey Senate elections
- November 4, 2011

All 40 seats in the New Jersey State Senate 21 seats needed for a majority
- Turnout: 27% (▼5pp)
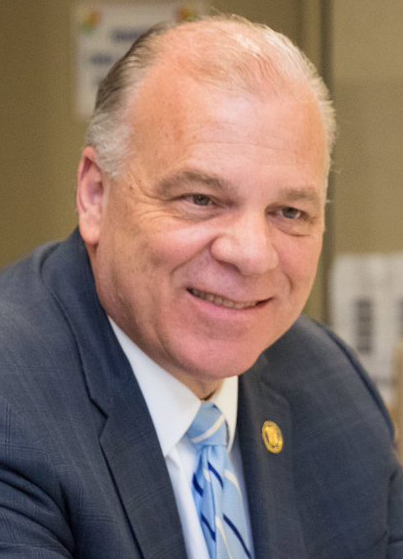

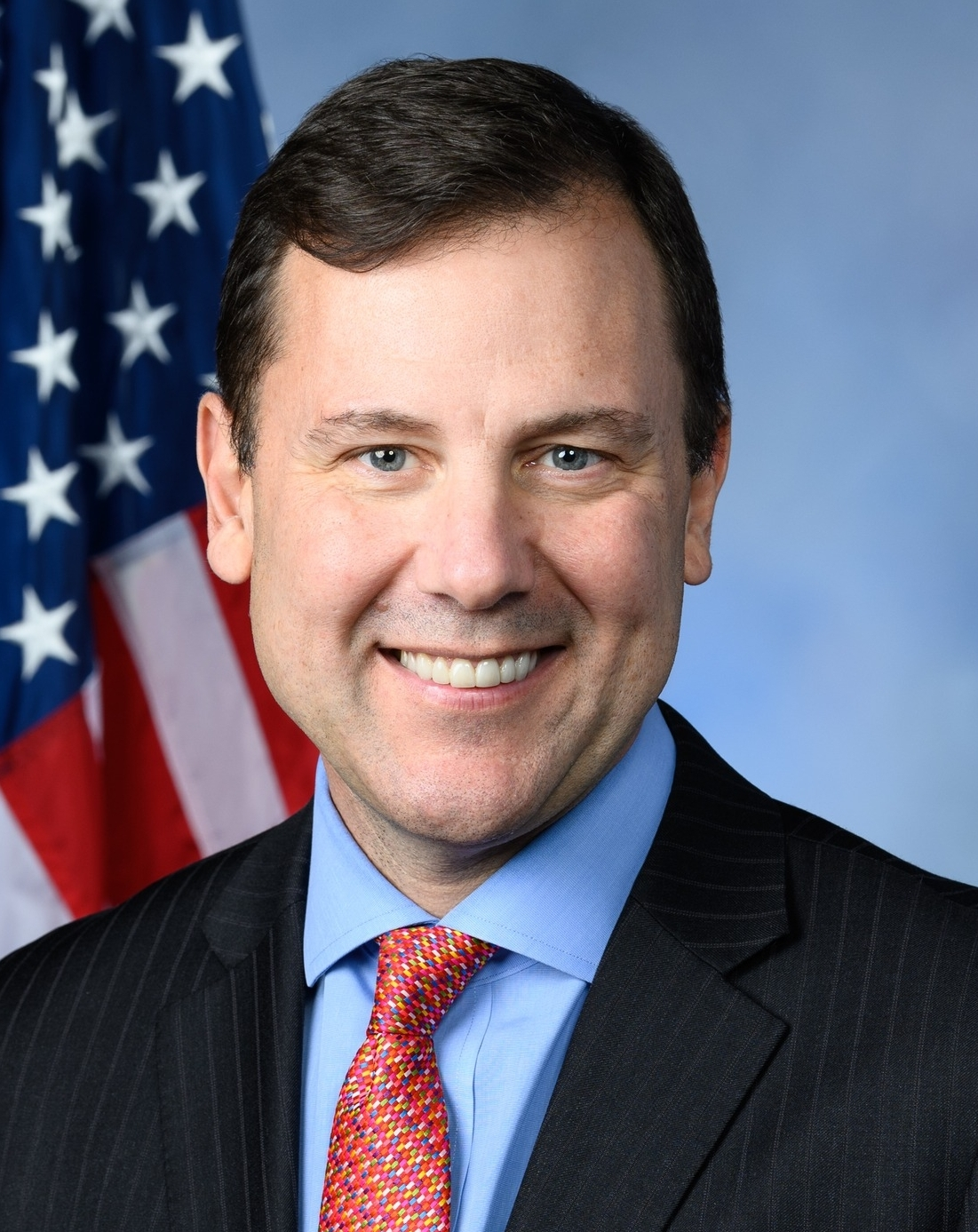
	Majority party	Minority party
Leader	Steve Sweeney	Thomas Kean Jr.
Party	Democratic	Republican
Leader since	January 12, 2010	January 8, 2008
Leader's seat	3rd (West Deptford)	21st (Westfield)
Last election	23	17
Seats before	24	16
Seats won	24	16
Seat change	Steady	Steady
Popular vote	677,435	645,569
Percentage	51.1%	48.7%
- Results by district Democratic hold Republican hold
Senate President before election
Steve Sweeney
Democratic
Elected Senate President
Steve Sweeney
Democratic

The 2011 New Jersey Senate election was held on November 4. The election took place midway through Chris Christie's first term as Governor of New Jersey. No seats changed hands, though Democrats had gained one seat in a 2010 special election with Linda Greenstein's victory over Tom Goodwin.

This was the first election under maps drawn after the 2010 census. Three incumbents retired from the Senate, including Sean Kean, who was redistricted into Jennifer Beck's district and ran for Assembly rather than challenge her.

Contents
Incumbents not running • Summary of results
By District: 1 • 2 • 3 • 4 • 5 • 6 • 7 • 8 • 9 • 10 • 11 • 12 • 13 • 14 • 15 • 16 • 17 • 18 • 19 • 20 • 21 • 22 • 23 • 24 • 25 • 26 • 27 • 28 • 29 • 30 • 31 • 32 • 33 • 34 • 35 • 36 • 37 • 38 • 39 • 40

== Incumbents not running for re-election ==
as per 2011 redistricting

=== Democratic ===
- John Girgenti (District 35)

=== Republican ===
- Andrew Ciesla (District 10)
- Sean T. Kean (District 11) (ran for Assembly)

== Predictions ==
Source	Ranking	As of
Ballotpedia	Lean D	October 31, 2011

== Summary of results by State Senate district ==
District	Incumbent	Party	Elected Senator	Party
1st Legislative District	Jeff Van Drew	Dem	Jeff Van Drew	Dem
2nd Legislative District	Jim Whelan	Dem	Jim Whelan	Dem
3rd Legislative District	Steve Sweeney	Dem	Steve Sweeney	Dem
4th Legislative District	Fred Madden	Dem	Fred Madden	Dem
5th Legislative District	Donald Norcross (Note: Norcross was appointed to the seat after Senator Dana Redd resigned to become mayor of Camden.)	Dem	Donald Norcross	Dem
6th Legislative District	James Beach (Note: Beach was appointed to the seat after Senator John Adler resigned to take his seat in the United States House of Representatives.)	Dem	James Beach	Dem
7th Legislative District	Diane Allen	Rep	Diane Allen	Rep
8th Legislative District	Dawn Addiego (Note: Addiego was appointed after Senator Phil Haines resigned to take a seat on the New Jersey Superior Court.)	Rep	Dawn Addiego	Rep
9th Legislative District	Christopher Connors	Rep	Christopher Connors	Rep
10th Legislative District	Andrew R. Ciesla	Rep	Jim Holzapfel	Rep
11th Legislative District	Sean T. Kean	Rep	Jennifer Beck	Rep
12th Legislative District	Jennifer Beck (Note: Redistricted to District 11.)	Rep	Samuel D. Thompson	Rep
13th Legislative District	Joe Kyrillos	Rep	Joe Kyrillos	Rep
14th Legislative District	Linda Greenstein (Note: Greenstein won a special election to complete the unexpired term of Senator Bill Baroni, who resigned to become Deputy Executive Director of the Port Authority. She defeated interim Senator Tom Goodwin.)	Dem	Linda Greenstein	Dem
15th Legislative District	Shirley Turner	Dem	Shirley Turner	Dem
16th Legislative District	Kip Bateman	Rep	Kip Bateman	Rep
17th Legislative District	Bob Smith	Dem	Bob Smith	Dem
18th Legislative District	Barbara Buono	Dem	Barbara Buono	Dem
19th Legislative District	Joe Vitale	Dem	Joe Vitale	Dem
20th Legislative District	Raymond Lesniak	Dem	Raymond Lesniak	Dem
21st Legislative District	Tom Kean Jr.	Rep	Tom Kean Jr.	Rep
22nd Legislative District	Nicholas Scutari	Dem	Nicholas Scutari	Dem
23rd Legislative District	Michael Doherty (Note: Doherty won a special election to complete the unexpired term of Senator Leonard Lance, who resigned to take his seat in the United States House of Representatives. He defeated interim Senator Marcia Karrow in the Republican primary.)	Rep	Michael Doherty	Rep
24th Legislative District	Steve Oroho	Rep	Steve Oroho	Rep
25th Legislative District	Anthony Bucco	Rep	Anthony Bucco	Rep
26th Legislative District	Joe Pennacchio	Rep	Joe Pennacchio	Rep
27th Legislative District	Richard Codey	Dem	Richard Codey	Dem
28th Legislative District	Ronald Rice	Dem	Ronald Rice	Dem
29th Legislative District	Teresa Ruiz	Dem	Teresa Ruiz	Dem
30th Legislative District	Robert W. Singer	Rep	Robert W. Singer	Rep
31st Legislative District	Sandra Bolden Cunningham	Dem	Sandra Bolden Cunningham	Dem
32nd Legislative District	Nicholas Sacco	Dem	Nicholas Sacco	Dem
33rd Legislative District	Brian Stack	Dem	Brian Stack	Dem
34th Legislative District	Nia Gill	Dem	Nia Gill	Dem
35th Legislative District	John Girgenti	Dem	Nellie Pou	Dem
36th Legislative District	Paul Sarlo	Dem	Paul Sarlo	Dem
37th Legislative District	Loretta Weinberg	Dem	Loretta Weinberg	Dem
38th Legislative District	Robert M. Gordon	Dem	Robert M. Gordon	Dem
39th Legislative District	Gerald Cardinale	Rep	Gerald Cardinale	Rep
40th Legislative District	Kevin O'Toole	Rep	Kevin O'Toole	Rep

=== Close races ===
1. District 38, 6.07%
2. District 2, 6.83%
3. District 1, 8.15%
4. District 16, 9.30%

== District 1 ==
New Jersey general election, 2011
Party	Candidate	Votes	%
Democratic	Jeff Van Drew	24,557	54.1
Republican	David S. DeWeese	20,857	45.9
Total votes		45,414	100.0

== District 2 ==
New Jersey general election, 2011
Party	Candidate	Votes	%
Democratic	Jim Whelan	24,075	53.4
Republican	Vince Polistina	20,997	46.6
Total votes		45,072	100.0

== District 3 ==
New Jersey general election, 2011
Party	Candidate	Votes	%
Democratic	Stephen M. Sweeney	25,299	55.6
Republican	Michael M. Mulligan	20,197	44.4
Total votes		45,496	100.0

== District 4 ==
New Jersey general election, 2011
Party	Candidate	Votes	%
Democratic	Fred H. Madden	23,868	62.1
Republican	Giancarlo D'Orazio	14,569	37.9
Total votes		38,437	100.0

== District 5 ==
New Jersey general election, 2011
Party	Candidate	Votes	%
Democratic	Donald W. Norcross	17,712	56.8
Republican	Keith Walker	13,444	43.2
Total votes		31,156	100.0

== District 6 ==
New Jersey general election, 2011
Party	Candidate	Votes	%
Democratic	James Beach	25,297	62.1
Republican	Phil Mitsch	15,415	37.9
Total votes		40,712	100.0

== District 7 ==
New Jersey general election, 2011
Party	Candidate	Votes	%
Republican	Diane Allen	27,011	57.0
Democratic	Gail Cook	20,370	43.0
Total votes		47,381	100.0

== District 8 ==
New Jersey general election, 2011
Party	Candidate	Votes	%
Republican	Dawn Marie Addiego	22,396	100.0
Total votes		22,396	100.0

== District 9 ==
New Jersey general election, 2011
Party	Candidate	Votes	%
Republican	Christopher J. Connors	32,027	64.9
Democratic	Dorothy A. Ryan	17,320	35.1
Total votes		49,347	100.0

== District 10 ==
New Jersey general election, 2011
Party	Candidate	Votes	%
Republican	Jim Holzapfel	28,675	64.0
Democratic	Charles P. Tivenan	16,105	36.0
Total votes		44,780	100.0

== District 11 ==
New Jersey general election, 2011
Party	Candidate	Votes	%
Republican	Jennifer Beck	20,226	56.6
Democratic	Raymond Santiago	15,487	43.4
Total votes		35,713	100.0

== District 12 ==
New Jersey general election, 2011
Party	Candidate	Votes	%
Republican	Samuel D. Thompson	22,578	59.9
Democratic	Robert "Bob" Brown	15,125	40.1
Total votes		37,703	100.0

== District 13 ==
New Jersey general election, 2011
Party	Candidate	Votes	%
Republican	Joe Kyrillos, Jr.	24,121	59.9
Democratic	Christopher G. Cullen	14,785	36.7
Constitution	Stephen J. Boracchia	556	1.4
Keep Monmouth Green	Karen Anne Zaletel	519	1.3
Jobs-Economy-Honesty	Mac Dara F. Lyden	260	0.6
Total votes		40,241	100.0

== District 14 ==
New Jersey general election, 2011
Party	Candidate	Votes	%
Democratic	Linda R. Greenstein	26,206	55.3
Republican	Richard J. Kanka	21,176	44.7
Total votes		47,382	100.0

== District 15 ==
New Jersey general election, 2011
Party	Candidate	Votes	%
Democratic	Shirley K. Turner	21,512	66.4
Republican	Donald J. Cox	10,900	33.6
Total votes		32,412	100.0

== District 16 ==
New Jersey general election, 2011
Party	Candidate	Votes	%
Republican	Christopher "Kip" Bateman	21,040	54.6
Democratic	Maureen Vella	17,460	45.4
Total votes		38,500	100.0

== District 17 ==
New Jersey general election, 2011
Party	Candidate	Votes	%
Democratic	Bob Smith	15,507	64.0
Republican	Jordan Rickards	8,715	36.0
Total votes		24,222	100.0

== District 18 ==
New Jersey general election, 2011
Party	Candidate	Votes	%
Democratic	Barbara Buono	19,631	60.1
Republican	Gloria S. Dittman	13,042	39.9
Total votes		32,673	100.0

== District 19 ==
New Jersey general election, 2011
Party	Candidate	Votes	%
Democratic	Joseph F. Vitale	18,623	66.9
Republican	Paul Lund, Jr.	9,232	33.1
Total votes		27,855	100.0

== District 20 ==
New Jersey general election, 2011
Party	Candidate	Votes	%
Democratic	Raymond J. Lesniak	12,510	75.5
Republican	Helen S. Rosales	4,052	24.5
Total votes		16,562	100.0

== District 21 ==
New Jersey general election, 2011
Party	Candidate	Votes	%
Republican	Thomas H. Kean, Jr.	27,750	67.5
Democratic	Paul Swanicke	13,351	32.5
Total votes		41,101	100.0

== District 22 ==
New Jersey general election, 2011
Party	Candidate	Votes	%
Democratic	Nicholas Scutari	16,104	61.6
Republican	Michael W. Class	10,024	38.4
Total votes		26,128	100.0

== District 23 ==
New Jersey general election, 2011
Party	Candidate	Votes	%
Republican	Michael J. Doherty	21,596	61.3
Democratic	John Graf, Jr.	12,579	35.7
For State Senate	Daniel Z. Seyler	1,040	3.0
Total votes		35,215	100.0

== District 24 ==
New Jersey general election, 2011
Party	Candidate	Votes	%
Republican	Steven V. Oroho	21,044	66.0
Democratic	Edwin Selby	10,837	34.0
Total votes		31,881	100.0

== District 25 ==
New Jersey general election, 2011
Party	Candidate	Votes	%
Republican	Anthony R. Bucco	19,228	61.0
Democratic	Rick Thoeni	12,298	39.0
Total votes		31,526	100.0

== District 26 ==
New Jersey general election, 2011
Party	Candidate	Votes	%
Republican	Joe Pennacchio	20,230	64.3
Democratic	Wasim Khan	10,317	32.8
Scafa For Senate	Joseph Scafa	913	2.9
Total votes		31,460	100.0

== District 27 ==
New Jersey general election, 2011
Party	Candidate	Votes	%
Democratic	Richard J. Codey	27,089	61.8
Republican	William H. Eames	16,741	38.2
Total votes		43,830	100.0

== District 28 ==
New Jersey general election, 2011
Party	Candidate	Votes	%
Democratic	Ronald L. Rice	14,781	76.6
Republican	Russell Mollica	4,519	23.4
Total votes		19,300	100.0

== District 29 ==
New Jersey general election, 2011
Party	Candidate	Votes	%
Democratic	M. Teresa Ruiz	9,076	82.2
Republican	Aracelis Sanabria Tejada	1,598	14.5
Independent	Laurie J. Taylor	363	3.3
Total votes		11,037	100.0

== District 30 ==
New Jersey general election, 2011
Party	Candidate	Votes	%
Republican	Robert W. Singer	21,990	65.9
Democratic	Steve Morlino	11,376	34.1
Total votes		33,366	100.0

== District 31 ==
New Jersey general election, 2011
Party	Candidate	Votes	%
Democratic	Sandra Bolden Cunningham	13,275	80.8
Republican	Donnamarie James	2,836	17.3
Eliminate Primary Elections	Louis Vernotico	320	1.9
Total votes		16,431	100.0

== District 32 ==
New Jersey general election, 2011
Party	Candidate	Votes	%
Democratic	Nicholas J. Sacco	16,413	80.8
Republican	Edward T. O'Neill	3,312	16.3
Politicians Are Crooks	Herbert H. Shaw	588	2.9
Total votes		20,313	100.0

== District 33 ==
New Jersey general election, 2011
Party	Candidate	Votes	%
Democratic	Brian P. Stack	20,223	86.6
Republican	Beth Hamburger	3,136	13.4
Total votes		23,359	100.0

== District 34 ==
New Jersey general election, 2011
Party	Candidate	Votes	%
Democratic	Nia H. Gill	17,118	79.6
Republican	Ralph Bartnik	4,386	20.4
Total votes		21,504	100.0

== District 35 ==
New Jersey general election, 2011
Party	Candidate	Votes	%
Democratic	Nellie Pou	14,386	74.7
Republican	Ken Pengitore	4,867	25.3
Total votes		19,253	100.0

== District 36 ==
New Jersey general election, 2011
Party	Candidate	Votes	%
Democratic	Paul A. Sarlo	18,582	62.7
Republican	Donald E. DiOrio	11,055	37.3
Total votes		29,637	100.0

== District 37 ==
New Jersey general election, 2011
Party	Candidate	Votes	%
Democratic	Loretta Weinberg	23,141	69.9
Republican	Robert S. Lebovics	9,980	30.1
Total votes		33,121	100.0

== District 38 ==
New Jersey general election, 2011
Party	Candidate	Votes	%
Democratic	Robert M. Gordon	22,299	53.0
Republican	John J. Driscoll, Jr.	19,745	47.0
Total votes		42,044	100.0

== District 39 ==
New Jersey general election, 2011
Party	Candidate	Votes	%
Republican	Gerald Cardinale	28,041	63.5
Democratic	Lorraine M. Waldes	16,097	36.5
Total votes		44,138	100.0

== District 40 ==
New Jersey general election, 2011
Party	Candidate	Votes	%
Republican	Kevin J. O'Toole	22,821	62.4
Democratic	John Zunic	13,733	37.6
Total votes		36,554	100.0

== See also ==
- 2011 New Jersey elections
- 2011 New Jersey General Assembly election
