= 2011 New Jersey General Assembly election =

New Jersey General Assembly Elections, 2011
- November 8, 2011

All 80 seats in the New Jersey General Assembly 41 seats needed for a majority
- Turnout: 27% (▼20pp)
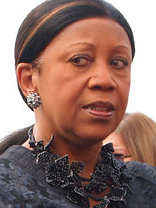

| | Majority party | Minority party |
|---|---|---|
| Leader | Sheila Oliver | Alex DeCroce |
| Party | Democratic | Republican |
| Leader since | January 12, 2010 | January 12, 2004 |
| Leader's seat | 34th (East Orange) | 26th (Parisippany-Troy Hills) |
| Last election | 47 | 33 |
| Seats won | 48 | 32 |
| Seat change | ▲1 | ▼1 |
| Popular vote | 1,339,201 | 1,253,824 |
| Percentage | 51.2% | 48.0% |
| Swing | ▲3.6% | ▼3.9% |
- Results: Democratic hold Democratic gain Republican hold
Speaker before election
Sheila Oliver
Democratic
Elected Speaker
Sheila Oliver
Democratic

All 80 seats in the General Assembly were up for election this year. In each Legislative district, there are two people elected; the top two winners in the general election are the ones sent to the Assembly. Typically, the two members of each party run as a team in each election. After the previous election, Democrats captured 47 seats while the Republicans won 33 seats. These were the first elections to be held after the 2010 redistricting cycle.

Democrats gained one seat, by flipping a seat in the 4th district, which they had only lost two years prior.

== Incumbents not seeking re-election ==
as per 2011 redistricting

=== Democratic ===
- Jack Conners, District 7
- Joan M. Quigley, District 32
- Caridad Rodriguez, District 33
- Elease Evans, District 35
- Nellie Pou, District 35 (ran for State Senate)
- Kevin J. Ryan, District 36
- Joan Voss, District 38 (ran for Bergen County Freeholder)

=== Republican ===
- Vincent J. Polistina, District 2 (ran for State Senate)
- Patrick Delany, District 8
- James Holzapfel, District 10 (ran for State Senate)
- Samuel D. Thompson, District 13 (ran for State Senate)

== Predictions ==
| Source | Ranking | As of |
|---|---|---|
| Ballotpedia | Lean D | October 31, 2011 |

== Overall results ==
Summary of the November 8, 2011 New Jersey General Assembly election results:

↓
| 48 | 32 |
| Democratic | Republican |

| Parties | Candidates | Seats | | | | Popular Vote | | |
| Parties | Candidates | 2009 | 2011 | +/- | Strength | Vote | % | Change |
|---|---|---|---|---|---|---|---|---|
| Democratic | 80 | 47 | 48 | ▲1 | 60% | 1,339,201 | 51.2% | 0.0% |
| Republican | 79 | 33 | 32 | ▼1 | 40% | 1,253,824 | 48.0% | 0.0% |
| Green | 2 | 0 | 0 | Steady | 0% | 2,284 | 0.1% | 0.0% |
| Libertarian | 4 | 0 | 0 | Steady | 0% | 3,692 | 0.1% | 0.0% |
| Independent | 10 | 0 | 0 | Steady | 0% | 15,310 | 0.6% | 0.0% |
| Total | 176 | 80 | 80 | 0 | 100.0% | 2,614,311 | 100.0% | - |

== Summary of results by district ==
| Legislative District | Position | Incumbent | Party | Elected Assembly Member | Party |
|---|---|---|---|---|---|
| 1st | 1 | Nelson Albano | Democrat | Nelson Albano | Democrat |
| 1st | 2 | Matthew Milam | Democrat | Matthew Milam | Democrat |
| 2nd | 1 | Vincent J. Polistina | Republican | Chris A. Brown | Republican |
| 2nd | 2 | John F. Amodeo | Republican | John Amodeo | Republican |
| 3rd | 1 | John J. Burzichelli | Democrat | John J. Burzichelli | Democrat |
| 3rd | 2 | Celeste Riley | Democrat | Celeste Riley | Democrat |
| 4th | 1 | Paul D. Moriarty | Democrat | Paul D. Moriarty | Democrat |
| 4th | 2 | Domenick DiCicco | Republican | Gabriela Mosquera | Democrat |
| 5th | 1 | Angel Fuentes | Democrat | Angel Fuentes | Democrat |
| 5th | 2 | Gilbert Wilson | Democrat | Gilbert Wilson | Democrat |
| 6th | 1 | Louis Greenwald | Democrat | Louis Greenwald | Democrat |
| 6th | 2 | Pamela Rosen Lampitt | Democrat | Pamela Rosen Lampitt | Democrat |
| 7th | 1 | Herb Conaway | Democrat | Herb Conaway | Democrat |
| 7th | 2 | Jack Conners | Democrat | Troy Singleton | Democrat |
| 8th | 1 | Scott Rudder | Republican | Scott Rudder | Republican |
| 8th | 2 | Patrick Delany | Republican | Christopher J. Brown | Republican |
| 9th | 1 | Brian E. Rumpf | Republican | Brian E. Rumpf | Republican |
| 9th | 2 | DiAnne Gove | Republican | DiAnne Gove | Republican |
| 10th | 1 | James Holzapfel | Republican | Gregory P. McGuckin | Republican |
| 10th | 2 | David W. Wolfe | Republican | David W. Wolfe | Republican |
| 11th | 1 | David Rible | Republican | Caroline Casagrande | Republican |
| 11th | 2 | Mary Pat Angelini | Republican | Mary Pat Angelini | Republican |
| 12th | 1 | Caroline Casagrande | Republican | Ronald S. Dancer | Republican |
| 12th | 2 | Declan O'Scanlon | Republican | Robert D. Clifton | Republican |
| 13th | 1 | Samuel D. Thompson | Republican | Declan O'Scanlon | Republican |
| 13th | 2 | Amy Handlin | Republican | Amy Handlin | Republican |
| 14th | 1 | Wayne DeAngelo | Democrat | Wayne DeAngelo | Democrat |
| 14th | 2 | Daniel R. Benson | Democrat | Daniel R. Benson | Democrat |
| 15th | 1 | Bonnie Watson Coleman | Democrat | Bonnie Watson Coleman | Democrat |
| 15th | 2 | Reed Gusciora | Democrat | Reed Gusciora | Democrat |
| 16th | 1 | Peter Biondi | Republican | Peter Biondi | Republican |
| 16th | 2 | Denise Coyle | Republican | Jack Ciattarelli | Republican |
| 17th | 1 | Upendra Chivukula | Democrat | Upendra Chivukula | Democrat |
| 17th | 2 | Joseph V. Egan | Democrat | Joseph V. Egan | Democrat |
| 18th | 1 | Peter J. Barnes III | Democrat | Peter J. Barnes III | Democrat |
| 18th | 2 | Patrick J. Diegnan | Democrat | Patrick J. Diegnan | Democrat |
| 19th | 1 | Craig Coughlin | Democrat | Craig Coughlin | Democrat |
| 19th | 2 | John Wisniewski | Democrat | John Wisniewski | Democrat |
| 20th | 1 | Annette Quijano | Democrat | Annette Quijano | Democrat |
| 20th | 2 | Joseph Cryan | Democrat | Joseph Cryan | Democrat |
| 21st | 1 | Jon Bramnick | Republican | Jon Bramnick | Republican |
| 21st | 2 | Nancy Munoz | Republican | Nancy Munoz | Republican |
| 22nd | 1 | Linda Stender | Democrat | Linda Stender | Democrat |
| 22nd | 2 | Jerry Green | Democrat | Jerry Green | Democrat |
| 23rd | 1 | Erik Peterson | Republican | Erik Peterson | Republican |
| 23rd | 2 | John DiMaio | Republican | John DiMaio | Republican |
| 24th | 1 | Gary Chiusano | Republican | Gary Chiusano | Republican |
| 24th | 2 | Alison Littell McHose | Republican | Alison Littell McHose | Republican |
| 25th | 1 | Tony Bucco | Republican | Tony Bucco | Republican |
| 25th | 2 | Michael Patrick Carroll | Republican | Michael Patrick Carroll | Republican |
| 26th | 1 | Alex DeCroce | Republican | Alex DeCroce | Republican |
| 26th | 2 | Jay Webber | Republican | Jay Webber | Republican |
| 27th | 1 | John F. McKeon | Democrat | John F. McKeon | Democrat |
| 27th | 2 | Mila Jasey | Democrat | Mila Jasey | Democrat |
| 28th | 1 | Cleopatra Tucker | Democrat | Cleopatra Tucker | Democrat |
| 28th | 2 | Ralph R. Caputo | Democrat | Ralph R. Caputo | Democrat |
| 29th | 1 | Alberto Coutinho | Democrat | Alberto Coutinho | Democrat |
| 29th | 2 | L. Grace Spencer | Democrat | L. Grace Spencer | Democrat |
| 30th | 1 | Ronald S. Dancer | Republican | Sean T. Kean | Republican |
| 30th | 2 | Joseph R. Malone | Republican | Dave Rible | Republican |
| 31st | 1 | Charles Mainor | Democrat | Charles Mainor | Democrat |
| 31st | 2 | Jason O'Donnell | Democrat | Jason O'Donnell | Democrat |
| 32nd | 1 | Joan Quigley | Democrat | Angelica M. Jimenez | Democrat |
| 32nd | 2 | Vincent Prieto | Democrat | Vincent Prieto | Democrat |
| 33rd | 1 | Caridad Rodriguez | Democrat | Sean Connors | Democrat |
| 33rd | 2 | Ruben Ramos | Democrat | Ruben Ramos | Democrat |
| 34th | 1 | Thomas P. Giblin | Democrat | Thomas P. Giblin | Democrat |
| 34th | 2 | Sheila Oliver | Democrat | Sheila Oliver | Democrat |
| 35th | 1 | Elease Evans | Democrat | Shavonda E. Sumter | Democrat |
| 35th | 2 | Nellie Pou | Democrat | Benjie E. Wimberly | Democrat |
| 36th | 1 | Gary Schaer | Democrat | Gary Schaer | Democrat |
| 36th | 2 | Kevin J. Ryan | Democrat | Marlene Caride | Democrat |
| 37th | 1 | Gordon M. Johnson | Democrat | Gordon M. Johnson | Democrat |
| 37th | 2 | Valerie Huttle | Democrat | Valerie Huttle | Democrat |
| 38th | 1 | Joan Voss | Democrat | Connie Wagner | Democrat |
| 38th | 2 | Tim Eustace | Democrat | Tim Eustace | Democrat |
| 39th | 1 | Charlotte Vandervalk | Republican | Holly Schepisi | Republican |
| 39th | 2 | Robert Schroeder | Republican | Robert Schroeder | Republican |
| 40th | 1 | Scott Rumana | Republican | Scott Rumana | Republican |
| 40th | 2 | David C. Russo | Republican | David C. Russo | Republican |

=== Close races ===
Districts where the difference of total votes between the top-two parties was under 10%:

1. District 7, 3.6%
2. District 1, 5.6%%
3. District 16, 6.0%
4. District 11, 6.4%
5. District 3, 9.2%

== List of races ==
Voters in each legislative district elect two members to the New Jersey General Assembly.

=== District 1 ===
1st Legislative District general election
| Party | Candidate | Votes | % |
|---|---|---|---|
| Democratic | Nelson Albano (incumbent) | 24,794 | 27.9 |
| Democratic | Matthew Milam (incumbent) | 22,207 | 24.9 |
| Republican | Sam Fiocchi | 21,156 | 23.7 |
| Republican | Suzanne Walters | 20,810 | 23.3 |
| Total votes | | 88,967 | 100.0 |
| Democratic hold | | | |

=== District 2 ===
2nd Legislative District general election
| Party | Candidate | Votes | % |
|---|---|---|---|
| Republican | John F. Amodeo | 25,330 | 29.2 |
| Republican | Chris A. Brown | 23,440 | 27.1 |
| Democratic | Damon Tyner | 19,919 | 23.0 |
| Democratic | Alisa Cooper | 17,933 | 20.7 |
| Total votes | | 86,622 | 100.0 |
| Republican hold | | | |

=== District 3 ===
3rd Legislative District general election
| Party | Candidate | Votes | % |
|---|---|---|---|
| Democratic | John J. Burzichelli (incumbent) | 25,172 | 28.0 |
| Democratic | Celeste Riley (incumbent) | 23,960 | 26.6 |
| Republican | Bob Villare | 20,528 | 22.6 |
| Republican | Domenick DiCicco (incumbent) | 20,268 | 22.5 |
| Total votes | | 125,153 | 100.0 |
| Democratic hold | | | |

=== District 4 ===
4th Legislative District general election
| Party | Candidate | Votes | % |
|---|---|---|---|
| Democratic | Paul D. Moriarty (incumbent) | 22,734 | 30.0 |
| Democratic | Gabriela Mosquera | 21,461 | 28.3 |
| Republican | Shelley Lovett | 15,106 | 19.9 |
| Republican | Patricia Fratticcioli | 14,724 | 19.4 |
| Family, Freedom, Community | Tony Celeste | 1,843 | 2.4 |
| Total votes | | 75,689 | 100.0 |
| One Democratic gain from Republican | | | |

=== District 5 ===
5th Legislative District general election
| Party | Candidate | Votes | % |
|---|---|---|---|
| Democratic | Gilbert Wilson (incumbent) | 17,691 | 28.7 |
| Democratic | Angel Fuentes (incumbent) | 17,586 | 28.5 |
| Republican | William Levins | 13,575 | 22.1 |
| Republican | Terrell Ratliff | 12,776 | 20.7 |
| Total votes | | 61,628 | 100.0 |
| Democratic hold | | | |

=== District 6 ===
6th Legislative District general election
| Party | Candidate | Votes | % |
|---|---|---|---|
| Democratic | Louis Greenwald (incumbent) | 24 272 | 30.0 |
| Democratic | Pamela Rosen Lampitt (incumbent) | 23,342 | 28.9 |
| Republican | Allan Richardson | 16,714 | 20.7 |
| Republican | Gregory Horton | 16,461 | 20.4 |
| Total votes | | 80,789 | 100.0 |
| Democratic hold | | | |

=== District 7 ===
7th Legislative District general election
| Party | Candidate | Votes | % |
|---|---|---|---|
| Democratic | Herb Conaway (incumbent) | 23,908 | 26.2 |
| Democratic | Troy Singleton | 23,403 | 25.6 |
| Republican | James Keenan | 22,144 | 24.3 |
| Republican | Christopher Halgas | 21,828 | 23.9 |
| Total votes | | 91,283 | 100.0 |
| Democratic hold | | | |

=== District 8 ===
8th Legislative District general election
| Party | Candidate | Votes | % |
|---|---|---|---|
| Republican | Christopher J. Brown | 19,799 | 30.2 |
| Republican | Scott Rudder (incumbent) | 19,649 | 29.9 |
| Democratic | Pam Finnerly | 12,480 | 19.1 |
| Democratic | Anita Lovely | 12,107 | 18.5 |
| Independent | Robert Edward Forchion Jr. | 1,653 | 2.5 |
| Total votes | | 65,508 | 100.0 |
| Republican hold | | | |

=== District 9 ===
9th Legislative District general election
| Party | Candidate | Votes | % |
|---|---|---|---|
| Republican | Brian E. Rumpf (incumbent) | 30,896 | 32.3 |
| Republican | DiAnne Gove (incumbent) | 29,898 | 31.2 |
| Democratic | Carla Kearny | 17,648 | 18.4 |
| Democratic | Bradley Billhimer | 17,338 | 18.1 |
| Total votes | | 95,780 | 100.0 |
| Republican hold | | | |

=== District 10 ===
10th Legislative District general election
| Party | Candidate | Votes | % |
|---|---|---|---|
| Republican | David W. Wolfe (incumbent) | 27,955 | 32.0 |
| Republican | Gregory P. McGuckin | 26,831 | 30.7 |
| Democratic | Bette Wary | 16,909 | 19.3 |
| Democratic | Eli Eytan | 15,698 | 18.0 |
| Total votes | | 87,393 | 100.0 |
| Republican hold | | | |

=== District 11 ===
11th Legislative District general election
| Party | Candidate | Votes | % |
|---|---|---|---|
| Republican | Caroline Casagrande (incumbent) | 18,739 | 26.8 |
| Republican | Mary Pat Angelini (incumbent) | 18,479 | 26.4 |
| Democratic | Vin Gopal | 15,392 | 21.9 |
| Democratic | Kathleen Horgan | 15,060 | 21.5 |
| Independent | Daniel Jacobson | 2,358 | 3.3 |
| Total votes | | 70,028 | 100.0 |
| Republican hold | | | |

=== District 12 ===
12th Legislative District general election
| Party | Candidate | Votes | % |
|---|---|---|---|
| Republican | Ronald S. Dancer (incumbent) | 22,345 | 30.3 |
| Republican | Robert D. Clifton (incumbent) | 21,469 | 29.1 |
| Democratic | William Spedding | 15,077 | 20.4 |
| Democratic | Catherine Tinney Rome | 14,969 | 20.3 |
| Total votes | | 73,860 | 100.0 |
| Republican hold | | | |

=== District 13 ===
13th Legislative District general election
| Party | Candidate | Votes | % |
|---|---|---|---|
| Republican | Amy Handlin (incumbent) | 24 073 | 30.5 |
| Republican | Declan O'Scanlon (incumbent) | 22,754 | 28.8 |
| Democratic | Patrick Short | 15,333 | 19.4 |
| Democratic | Kevin Lavan | 15,165 | 19.2 |
| Constitution Party | Frank C. Cottone | 834 | 1.1 |
| Constitution Party | William Lawton | 757 | 1.0 |
| Total votes | | 78,916 | 100.0 |
| Republican hold | | | |

=== District 14 ===
14th Legislative District general election
| Party | Candidate | Votes | % |
|---|---|---|---|
| Democratic | Wayne DeAngelo (incumbent) | 26,626 | 29.0 |
| Democratic | Daniel R. Benson (incumbent) | 25,662 | 28.0 |
| Republican | Sheree McGowan | 19,135 | 20.9 |
| Republican | Phil Kaufman | 19,100 | 20.8 |
| Green | Steven Welzer | 1,189 | 1.3 |
| Total votes | | 91,172 | 100.0 |
| Democratic hold | | | |

=== District 15 ===
15th Legislative District general election
| Party | Candidate | Votes | % |
|---|---|---|---|
| Democratic | Bonnie Watson Coleman (incumbent) | 20,505 | 32.8 |
| Democratic | Reed Gusciora (incumbent) | 20,350 | 32.5 |
| Republican | Kathy Kilcommons | 10,914 | 17.4 |
| Republican | Peter Yull | 10,817 | 17.3 |
| Total votes | | 62,586 | 100.0 |
| Democratic hold | | | |

=== District 16 ===
16th Legislative District general election
| Party | Candidate | Votes | % |
|---|---|---|---|
| Republican | Peter Biondi (incumbent) | 20,359 | 26.9 |
| Republican | Jack Ciattarelli | 19,770 | 26.1 |
| Democratic | Joe Carmarota | 17,795 | 23.5 |
| Democratic | Marie Corfield | 17,779 | 23.5 |
| Total votes | | 75,703 | 100.0 |
| Republican hold | | | |

=== District 17 ===
17th Legislative District general election
| Party | Candidate | Votes | % |
|---|---|---|---|
| Democratic | Joseph V. Egan (incumbent) | 15,165 | 31.9 |
| Democratic | Upendra Chivukula (incumbent) | 14,862 | 31.3 |
| Republican | Robert Mettler | 8,876 | 18.7 |
| Republican | Carlo DiLalla | 8,627 | 18.2 |
| Total votes | | 47,530 | 100.0 |
| Democratic hold | | | |

=== District 18 ===
18th Legislative District general election
| Party | Candidate | Votes | % |
|---|---|---|---|
| Democratic | Peter J. Barnes III (incumbent) | 18,166 | 28.6 |
| Democratic | Patrick J. Diegnan (incumbent) | 18,050 | 28.4 |
| Republican | Joseph Sinagra | 13,996 | 22.0 |
| Republican | Marcia Silva | 13,333 | 21.0 |
| Total votes | | 63,454 | 100.0 |
| Democratic hold | | | |

=== District 19 ===
19th Legislative District general election
| Party | Candidate | Votes | % |
|---|---|---|---|
| Democratic | John Wisniewski (incumbent) | 18,241 | 34.0 |
| Democratic | Craig Coughlin (incumbent) | 17,492 | 32.6 |
| Republican | Angel Leon | 9,008 | 16.8 |
| Republican | Shane Robinson | 8,915 | 16.6 |
| Total votes | | 53,656 | 100.0 |
| Democratic hold | | | |

=== District 20 ===
20th Legislative District general election
| Party | Candidate | Votes | % |
|---|---|---|---|
| Democratic | Annette Quijano (incumbent) | 12,116 | 42.7 |
| Democratic | Joseph Cryan (incumbent) | 12,104 | 42.7 |
| Republican | John Donoso | 4,128 | 14.6 |
| Total votes | | 28,348 | 100.0 |
| Democratic hold | | | |

=== District 21 ===
21st Legislative District general election
| Party | Candidate | Votes | % |
|---|---|---|---|
| Republican | Nancy Munoz (incumbent) | 25,491 | 31.9 |
| Republican | Jon Bramnick (incumbent) | 25,303 | 31.7 |
| Democratic | Bruce Bergen | 13,878 | 17.4 |
| Democratic | Norman Albert | 13,864 | 17.4 |
| Libertarian Party | Darren Young | 1,324 | 1.7 |
| Total votes | | 79,860 | 100.0 |
| Republican hold | | | |

=== District 22 ===
22nd Legislative District general election
| Party | Candidate | Votes | % |
|---|---|---|---|
| Democratic | Linda Stender | 15,747 | 30.5 |
| Democratic | Jerry Green (incumbent) | 14,957 | 29.0 |
| Republican | Joan Van Pelt | 10,846 | 21.0 |
| Republican | Jeffery First | 10,062 | 19.5 |
| Total votes | | 51,612 | 100.0 |
| Democratic hold | | | |

=== District 23 ===
23rd Legislative District general election
| Party | Candidate | Votes | % |
|---|---|---|---|
| Republican | John DiMaio (incumbent) | 21,189 | 31.2 |
| Republican | Erik Peterson (incumbent) | 21,074 | 30.9 |
| Democratic | Karen Carroll | 13,369 | 19.6 |
| Democratic | Scott McDonald | 12,420 | 18.2 |
| Total votes | | 68,152 | 100.0 |
| Republican hold | | | |

=== District 24 ===
24th Legislative District general election
| Party | Candidate | Votes | % |
|---|---|---|---|
| Republican | Alison Littell McHose (incumbent) | 19,026 | 30.6 |
| Republican | Gary Chiusano (incumbent) | 18,561 | 29.8 |
| Democratic | Leslie Huhn | 10,290 | 16.5 |
| Democratic | Jim Nye | 9,832 | 15.8 |
| Constitution | Rose Ann Salanitri | 3,161 | 5.1 |
| Independent | Mark Quick | 1,382 | 2.2 |
| Total votes | | 62,252 | 100.0 |
| Republican hold | | | |

=== District 25 ===
25th Legislative District general election
| Party | Candidate | Votes | % |
|---|---|---|---|
| Republican | Michael Patrick Carroll (incumbent) | 18,481 | 30.0 |
| Republican | Tony Bucco (incumbent) | 18,218 | 29.5 |
| Democratic | Gale Colucci | 12,564 | 20.4 |
| Democratic | George Stafford | 12,432 | 20.2 |
| Total votes | | 61,695 | 100.0 |
| Republican hold | | | |

=== District 26 ===
26th Legislative District general election
| Party | Candidate | Votes | % |
|---|---|---|---|
| Republican | Alex DeCroce (incumbent) | 19,696 | 32.0 |
| Republican | Jay Webber (incumbent) | 19,543 | 31.8 |
| Democratic | Joseph Raich | 10,847 | 17.6 |
| Democratic | Elliot Isibor | 10,319 | 16.8 |
| Green | Michael Spector | 1,095 | 1.8 |
| Total votes | | 61,500 | 100.0 |
| Republican hold | | | |

=== District 27 ===
27th Legislative District general election
| Party | Candidate | Votes | % |
|---|---|---|---|
| Democratic | John F. McKeon (incumbent) | 23,508 | 28.0 |
| Democratic | Mila Jasey (incumbent) | 22,757 | 27.1 |
| Republican | Lee Holtzman | 18,857 | 22.5 |
| Republican | Nicole Hagner | 18,790 | 22.4 |
| Total votes | | 83,912 | 100.0 |
| Democratic hold | | | |

=== District 28 ===
28th Legislative District general election
| Party | Candidate | Votes | % |
|---|---|---|---|
| Democratic | Cleopatra Tucker (incumbent) | 14,002 | 38.2 |
| Democratic | Ralph R. Caputo (incumbent) | 13,786 | 37.6 |
| Republican | Carol Humphreys | 4,607 | 12.6 |
| Republican | David H. Pinckney | 4,258 | 11.6 |
| Total votes | | 36,653 | 100.0 |
| Democratic hold | | | |

=== District 29 ===
29th Legislative District general election
| Party | Candidate | Votes | % |
|---|---|---|---|
| Democratic | L. Grace Spencer (incumbent) | 8,572 | 42.0 |
| Democratic | Alberto Coutinho (incumbent) | 8,391 | 41.1 |
| Republican | Elaine Guarino | 1,736 | 8.5 |
| Republican | Lisa Kistner | 1,687 | 8.2 |
| Total votes | | 20,386 | 100.0 |
| Democratic hold | | | |

=== District 30 ===
30th Legislative District general election
| Party | Candidate | Votes | % |
|---|---|---|---|
| Republican | Sean T. Kean (incumbent) | 22,889 | 34.4 |
| Republican | Dave Rible (incumbent) | 20,728 | 31.2 |
| Democratic | Shaun O'Rourke | 11,256 | 16.9 |
| Democratic | Howard Kleinhendler | 10,639 | 16.0 |
| Libertarian Party (United States) | Davis Schneck | 986 | 1.5 |
| Total votes | | 66,498 | 100.0 |
| Republican hold | | | |

=== District 31 ===
31st Legislative District general election
| Party | Candidate | Votes | % |
|---|---|---|---|
| Democratic | Jason O'Donnell (incumbent) | 11,877 | 40.3 |
| Democratic | Charles Mainor (incumbent) | 11,690 | 39.6 |
| Republican | Michael Alonso | 3,157 | 10.7 |
| Republican | Daniel Beckelman | 2,751 | 9.3 |
| Total votes | | 29,475 | 100.0 |
| Democratic hold | | | |

=== District 32 ===
32nd Legislative District general election
| Party | Candidate | Votes | % |
|---|---|---|---|
| Democratic | Vincent Prieto (incumbent) | 15,753 | 41.5 |
| Democratic | Angelica M. Jimenez (incumbent) | 15,211 | 40.0 |
| Republican | Michael Bartulovich | 3,443 | 9.1 |
| Republican | Ronald Tarolla | 3,249 | 8.5 |
| Independent | April Tricoli-Busset | 498 | 1.3 |
| Total votes | | 37,974 | 100.0 |
| Democratic hold | | | |

=== District 33 ===
33rd Legislative District general election
| Party | Candidate | Votes | % |
|---|---|---|---|
| Democratic | Ruben Ramos (incumbent) | 17,444 | 42.7 |
| Democratic | Sean Connors (incumbent) | 17,064 | 41.8 |
| Republican | Christopher Garcia | 3,214 | 7.8 |
| Republican | Fernando Uribe | 3,121 | 7.6 |
| Total votes | | 40,843 | 100.0 |
| Democratic hold | | | |

=== District 34 ===
34th Legislative District general election
| Party | Candidate | Votes | % |
|---|---|---|---|
| Democratic | Thomas P. Giblin (incumbent) | 16,285 | 39.1 |
| Democratic | Sheila Oliver (incumbent) | 15,462 | 37.1 |
| Republican | Steve Farrell | 4,270 | 10.2 |
| Republican | Joan Salensky | 4,251 | 10.2 |
| Independent | Clenard Childress | 813 | 1.6 |
| Independent | David Taylor | 586 | 1.4 |
| Total votes | | 41,667 | 100.0 |
| Democratic hold | | | |

=== District 35 ===
35th Legislative District general election
| Party | Candidate | Votes | % |
|---|---|---|---|
| Democratic | Benjie E. Wimberly | 13,551 | 50.5 |
| Democratic | Shavonda E. Sumter | 13,143 | 49.0 |
| Republican | Donna Puglisi | 5,114 | 19.1 |
| Republican | James Challice | 5,020 | 18.7 |
| Total votes | | 26,828 | 100.0 |
| Democratic hold | | | |

=== District 36 ===
36th Legislative District general election
| Party | Candidate | Votes | % |
|---|---|---|---|
| Democratic | Gary Schaer (incumbent) | 17,262 | 30.5 |
| Democratic | Marlene Caride | 16,319 | 28.8 |
| Republican | Sara Rosengarten | 11,735 | 20.7 |
| Republican | John Genovesi | 11,256 | 20.0 |
| Total votes | | 56,572 | 100.0 |
| Democratic hold | | | |

=== District 37 ===
37th Legislative District general election
| Party | Candidate | Votes | % |
|---|---|---|---|
| Democratic | Valerie Huttle (incumbent) | 22,062 | 35.9 |
| Democratic | Gordon M. Johnson (incumbent) | 21,839 | 34.1 |
| Republican | Keith Jensen | 10,150 | 15.7 |
| Republican | Gregory Aslanian | 9,929 | 15.4 |
| Libertarian Party | Julian Heicklen | 675 | 1.0 |
| Total votes | | 64,655 | 100.0 |
| Democratic hold | | | |

=== District 38 ===
38th Legislative District general election
| Party | Candidate | Votes | % |
|---|---|---|---|
| Democratic | Connie Wagner (incumbent) | 22,258 | 29.0 |
| Democratic | Tim Eustace | 21,097 | 27.2 |
| Republican | Richard Goldberg | 19,091 | 23.3 |
| Republican | Fernando Alonso | 18,820 | 22.9 |
| Libertarian Party | Vinko Grskovic | 707 | 0.8 |
| Total votes | | 81,973 | 100.0 |
| Democratic hold | | | |

=== District 39 ===
39th Legislative District general election
| Party | Candidate | Votes | % |
|---|---|---|---|
| Republican | Robert Schroeder (incumbent) | 26,572 | 30.9 |
| Republican | Holly Schepisi | 26,111 | 30.3 |
| Democratic | Michael McCarthy | 16,200 | 18.8 |
| Democratic | Anthony Iannarelli Jr. | 15,784 | 18.3 |
| Independent | Clinton Bosca | 1,425 | 1.7 |
| Total votes | | 86,092 | 100.0 |
| Republican hold | | | |

=== District 40 ===
40th Legislative District general election
| Party | Candidate | Votes | % |
|---|---|---|---|
| Republican | David C. Russo (incumbent) | 22,125 | 30.3 |
| Republican | Scott Rumana (incumbent) | 21,678 | 29.7 |
| Democratic | Cassandra Lazzara | 15,412 | 21.1 |
| Democratic | William Brennan | 13,767 | 18.9 |
| Total votes | | 72,982 | 100.0 |
| Republican hold | | | |

== See also ==
- 2011 New Jersey elections
- 2011 New Jersey Senate election
