= 2010 New Jersey elections =

- November 2, 2010

Elections were held in New Jersey on Tuesday, November 2, 2010. Primary elections were held on June 8, 2010.

== Federal ==
=== United States House ===
All 13 New Jersey seats in the United States House of Representatives were up for election in 2010. Republicans gained one seat, thereby reducing Democrats to a 7-6 majority in the delegation, despite losing the popular vote.

== State ==
=== State Senate ===
On February 19, 2010, Bill Baroni resigned his New Jersey Senate seat to be a member of the Port Authority Board. His resignation triggered a special election for the 14th legislative district, which includes portions of Mercer and Middlesex counties. Democratic Assemblywoman Linda Greenstein was elected over Republican Tom Goodwin, who had been appointed to fill the vacant seat.

Polling

Poll source	Date(s) administered	Sample size	Margin of error	Tom Goodwin (R)	Linda Greenstein (D)	Undecided
National Research Inc.	August 2010	300 LV	± 5.66%	41%	38%	19%

Results

Special election, November 2, 2010
Party	Candidate	Votes	%	±%
Democratic	Linda R. Greenstein	36,411	53.8	▲16.1
Republican	Thomas Goodwin	31,311	46.2	▼16.1
Total votes		'67,722'	'100.0'	

=== State General Assembly ===
In the New Jersey General Assembly, the 31st legislative district seat was vacated by Anthony Chiappone on July 20, 2010, after he pled guilty to charges of official misconduct and campaign finance law violations. The Hudson County Democratic Committee selected Jason O' Donnell, a former Democratic county leader, to replace him. O'Donnell was elected to finish the remainder of the term.

Results

Special election, November 2, 2010
Party	Candidate	Votes	%
Democratic	Jason O'Donnell	19,492	65.8
Republican	Joseph Turula	5,146	17.4
Unbought and Unbossed	Robert Mays	2,516	8.5
For The People	Denis F. Wilbeck	2,463	8.3
Total votes		29,617	100.0

=== Ballot measures ===
Public Question 1 was approved with 80.3% of the vote, which amended the state Constitution so that "any assessments on wages by the state be dedicated to the payment of employee benefits."

== Local ==
Various county and municipal elections were held simultaneously, including elections for mayor in Newark.
