= Barbara Wright (politician) =

American politician (born 1933)

Member of the New Jersey General Assembly from the 14th Legislative District
- In office January 14, 1992 – January 11, 2000 Serving with Paul Kramer
- Preceded by: Anthony J. Cimino; Peter A. Cantu
- Succeeded by: Gary Guear; Linda R. Greenstein

Personal details
- Born: August 3, 1933 (age 92) Cranbury, New Jersey
- Party: Republican

Barbara Wright (born August 3, 1933) is an American Republican Party politician who served four terms in the New Jersey General Assembly, from 1992 to 2000, where she represented the 14th Legislative District. A full-time legislator, Wright served as Mayor of Plainsboro Township, New Jersey in 1984 and 1985.

== Early career ==
Born in Cranbury, New Jersey, Wright graduated from Hightstown High School, earned her undergraduate degree in nursing from Boston College, was awarded a Master of Education from Rutgers University and earned a Master of Arts in nursing education, and doctor of philosophy from New York University. She served on the board of education of the West Windsor-Plainsboro Regional School District from 1974 to 1977, was deputy mayor of Plainsboro Township from 1977 to 1983 and served as the township's mayor in 1984 and 1985.

== Assemblyperson ==
She was first elected to the Assembly in 1991 with running mate Paul Kramer, knocking off Democratic incumbents Anthony J. Cimino and Peter A. Cantu. The pair won re-election together in 1993, 1995 and 1997. Wright served in the Assembly as Assistant Majority Whip in 1994 and 1995 and was a Deputy Speaker in 1998 and 1999. She served on the Consumer and Regulated Professions Committee, the Education Committee, and the Health Committee.

Legislation co-sponsored by Wright in 1998 would reduce the dollar value of false insurance claims needed to receive 5 to 10 years in prison and fines of as much as $100,000. With statistics citing that 16% of the average insurance bill was for fraudulent claims, the legislation proposed by Wright would cut the threshold from $75,000 in false claims down to $1,000 in at least five fraudulent claims.

In the 1999 election, Republican incumbents Paul Kramer and Wright were narrowly defeated by Democrats Linda R. Greenstein and Gary Guear, with the incumbents losing votes in Hamilton Township, where Democrat Glen Gilmore won the race for mayor. The two gains were among the three Republicans seats Democrats picked up in the Assembly in the 1999 elections, though the Republicans retained their majority.

In February 2010, Wright announced that she was going to run for the Republican nomination to fill the New Jersey Senate seat vacated by Bill Baroni. Wright cited the lack of Republican women in the Senate — only Diane Allen and Jennifer Beck were serving at the time — as part of her motivation for running. By a vote of Republican committee persons in the 14th District on March 11, 2010, she was defeated 75-31 by Hamilton Township councilman Tom Goodwin. Wright has been a resident of Monroe Township, Middlesex County, New Jersey.

New Jersey General Assembly
Preceded by Anthony J. Cimino; Peter A. Cantu	Member of the New Jersey General Assembly for the 14th District; 1992 – 2000; With: Paul Kramer	Succeeded by Gary Guear; Linda R. Greenstein
