= Gerry Nardello =

Member of the New Jersey General Assembly

Member of the New Jersey General Assembly from the 8th district
- In office November 21, 2011 – January 10, 2012 Serving with Scott Rudder
- Preceded by: Pat Delany
- Succeeded by: Christopher J. Brown

Personal details
- Party: Republican

Gerry Nardello is an American Republican Party politician who represented the 8th Legislative district in the New Jersey General Assembly from 2011 to 2012.

Nardello had served for 16 years on the Mount Laurel township council and was the township's first woman to serve as mayor.

On August 11, 2011, Pat Delany resigned from his seat in the General Assembly seat in the 8th district, after his wife sent an offensive letter to opposing candidate Carl Lewis, who was planning on running for a seat in the Assembly. Burlington County Republicans selected Nardello to serve the remainder of Delany's term and also selected Christopher J. Brown to be the Republican candidate in the 2011 New Jersey General Assembly election. She was sworn into office on November 21, 2011.
