= Jacob Wetterling Crimes Against Children and Sexually Violent Offender Registration Act =

US law regarding sexual abuse

Jacob Wetterling Crimes Against Children Registration Act
- Long title: To require any person who is convicted of a State criminal offense against a victim who is a minor to register a current address with law enforcement officials of the State for 10 years after release from prison, parole, or supervision.
- Nicknames: Wetterling Act
- Enacted by: the 103rd United States Congress
- Effective: November 20, 1993

Legislative history
- Introduced in the House as H.R. 3355 by Jim Ramstad (R–MN) on January 5, 1993; Committee consideration by Judiciary, United States House Judiciary Subcommittee on Crime, Terrorism, Homeland Security and Investigations

The Jacob Wetterling Crimes Against Children and Sexually Violent Offender Registration Act, colloquially known as the Wetterling Act, is a United States law that requires states to implement a registry of sex offenders and crimes against children. It is named for Jacob Wetterling, a Minnesota eleven-year-old who was abducted and sexually assaulted by a stranger in 1989, and was missing for almost 27 years until his death was confirmed when his remains were found on September 1, 2016.

The law, enacted as part of the Federal Violent Crime Control and Law Enforcement Act of 1994, requires states to form registries of offenders convicted of sexually violent offenses or offenses against children, and to form more rigorous registration requirements for sex offenders. States must also verify the addresses of sex offenders annually for at least ten years, and those offenders classified as sexually violent predators must verify their addresses quarterly for the rest of their lives, with failure to do so resulting in criminal offense. The law also heavily encouraged states to collect and record DNA samples from sex offenders. The Wetterling Act required state compliance by September 1997, with a two-year extension for good faith efforts to achieve compliance; non-compliance would result in a 10% reduction of federal block grant funds for criminal justice.

Under this law, states had discretion to disseminate registration information to the public, but dissemination was not required. Congress amended the Wetterling Act in 1996 with Megan's Law, requiring law enforcement agencies to release information about registered sex offenders that law enforcement deems relevant to protecting the public. The law, however, did not offer detailed instructions to states about "how" to properly notify the public. Also passed by Congress in 1996 was the Pam Lychner Sexual Offender Tracking and Identification Act. This act requires the Federal Bureau of Investigation (FBI) to establish a national database of sex offenders to assist local enforcement agencies in tracking sex offenders across state lines. The Pam Lychner Act was slowly implemented due to incompatible software in certain states. By 1996, all states had implemented registration laws, and by 1999 all states required public notification of some sort.

The Wetterling Act was amended for the final time in 1998 with Section 115 of the General Provisions of Title I of the Departments of Commerce, Justice and State, the Judiciary, and Related Agencies Appropriations Act (CJSA). The CJSA amendment provided for greater discretion among states for procedures used for contacting registered offenders to keep their addresses updated. Also, the CJSA required offenders to register in a state other than their own if they were there for school, and required federal and military employees to register in their state of residence.

On the In the Dark podcast about the case in 2016, Patty Wetterling said the law "doesn't work".

== See also ==
- Sex offender registry
- Megan's law
- Adam Walsh Child Protection and Safety Act
