= Paul Kramer =

American politician (1933–2020)

Member of the New Jersey General Assembly from the 14th district
- In office January 14, 1992 – January 11, 2000
- Preceded by: Peter A. Cantu; Anthony J. Cimino
- Succeeded by: Linda R. Greenstein; Gary Guear

Personal details
- Born: September 6, 1933 Trenton, New Jersey, U.S.
- Died: June 16, 2020 (aged 86) Hamilton Township, New Jersey, U.S.
- Party: Republican

Paul Kramer (September 6, 1933 – June 16, 2020) was an American Republican Party politician. He served four terms in the New Jersey General Assembly, where he represented the 14th Legislative District from 1992 to 2000. He was best known for sponsoring New Jersey's Megan's Law that created a statewide sex offender registry follow the murder of Megan Kanka, a seven-year-old girl.

== Early career ==
Kramer earned his undergraduate degree from Rider College, where he majored in Accounting. He served in the United States Air Force from 1952 to 1956. He was employed as Finance Director of Hamilton Township, Mercer County, New Jersey. Kramer served from 1966 to 1976 as the Assistant Comptroller for the City of Trenton, was chair of the Hamilton Township Improvement Authority from 1980 to 1984 and was a member of the Mercer County Board of Chosen Freeholders from 1985 to 1992.

== Assemblyman ==
Kramer was elected to the General Assembly in 1991 together with Barbara Wright, in a wave of Republican victories following voter dissatisfaction with Democratic Governor of New Jersey James Florio. The two were re-elected in 1993, 1995 and 1997. Kramer served in the Assembly on the Banking and Insurance Committee and the Labor Committee, and was Assistant Majority Leader starting in 1998. In the 1999 election, Kramer and Wright were narrowly defeated by Democrats Linda R. Greenstein and Gary Guear, with the incumbents losing votes in Hamilton Township, where Democrat Glen Gilmore won the race for mayor. The two losses were among the three seats Republicans lost in the Assembly in the 1999 elections, though they retained their majority. Kramer and Wright ran again in 2001, losing for a second time to Greenstein and Guear.

Kramer was the Assembly sponsor in 1994 of a package of seven bills known as Megan's Law that were approved one month after the rape and murder of Hamilton Township seven-year-old Megan Kanka by Jesse Timmendequas, a sex offender who had been previously convicted of sex crimes and had lived, together with two other sex offenders, across the street from Kanka. The bills required sex offender registry, with a database tracked by the state, community notification of registered sex offenders moving into a neighborhood, and life in prison without a chance of parole for those convicted of a second sexual assault. Kramer expressed incredulity at the controversy created by the bills, saying that "Megan Kanka would be alive today" if the bills he proposed had been law.

He died on June 16, 2020, in Hamilton Township, New Jersey at age 86.
