= Gary Guear =

American politician

Member of the New Jersey General Assembly from the 14th district
- In office January 11, 2000 – January 13, 2004 Serving with Linda R. Greenstein
- Preceded by: Paul Kramer; Barbara Wright
- Succeeded by: Bill Baroni

Personal details
- Born: Gary L. Guear, Sr. October 24, 1951 (age 75)
- Party: Democratic

Gary L. Guear, Sr. (born October 24, 1951) is an American Democratic Party politician, who served in the New Jersey General Assembly from 2000 to 2004, where he represented the 14th Legislative District.

== Biography ==
Guear served in the Assembly on the Intergovernmental Relations Commission (as Chair), the Homeland Security & State Preparedness Committee (as Vice Chair) and the Labor Committee.

Guear served in the Trenton Police Department from 1975 to 2000, attaining the rank of detective.

In the 1999 election, Republican incumbents Paul Kramer and Barbara Wright were narrowly defeated by Democrats Linda R. Greenstein and Guear, with the incumbents losing votes in Hamilton Township, where Democrat Glen Gilmore won the race for mayor. The two gains were among the three Republican seats Democrats picked up in the Assembly in the 1999 elections, though the Republicans retained their majority.

In his 2003 re-election campaign against Bill Baroni, Guear charged that Baroni had lied in his campaign biography by saying he was a lifelong resident of Hamilton Township. Baroni had been born in Jacksonville, Florida to an unwed Irish woman who came to the United States to have her baby. Catholic Charities arranged for him to be adopted by William Sr. and Geraldine Baroni a few days later. When Baroni responded that he had lived in Hamilton since he was a few days old and told the story of his adoption, Guear's move backfired and Baroni won the election.
