= Pat Delany =

Member of the New Jersey General Assembly

Pat Delaney

Member of the New Jersey General Assembly from the 8th district
- In office December 13, 2010 – August 12, 2011 Serving with Scott Rudder
- Preceded by: Dawn Addiego
- Succeeded by: Gerry Nardello

Personal details
- Party: Republican
- Education: Rutgers University; Old Dominion University

Patrick Delany is an American Republican Party politician who served in the New Jersey General Assembly representing the 8th legislative district. Delany was selected to replace Dawn Addiego after she moved to the New Jersey Senate, and was sworn in on December 13, 2010. He resigned on August 12, 2011. Former Mount Laurel mayor Gerry Nardello was selected to fill out the remainder of his term, and Christopher J. Brown won the seat in the 2011 general election.

== Biography ==
Delany received a B.A. degree from Rutgers University and an M.B.A. from Old Dominion University. He served as a commissioned officer in the United States Navy from 1991 to 1998, achieving the rank of Lieutenant.

Since 1998, Delany has worked in the field of information technology. He founded the IT firm South Jersey Computer Pros and helped form the Greater Lumberton Business Association.

Delany served on the Lumberton Township Committee from 2005 to 2010. He was Mayor of Lumberton Township from 2007 to 2008. He also served as Burlington County Library Commissioner from 2002 to 2010.

On November 15, 2010, Assemblywoman Dawn Addiego was selected by the Burlington County Republican committee to fill the vacant seat of Phil Haines, who left to serve on the New Jersey Superior Court. At the same committee meeting, Delany was selected to fill Addiego's vacant seat. He was sworn in on December 13, 2010.

On July 28, 2011, Delany announced his plans to resign from his Assembly seat, Burlington County Republicans selected Gerry Nardello, former mayor of Mount Laurel, to serve the remainder of Delany's term, until January 2012. They also selected Burlington County Freeholder Christopher J. Brown to be the Republican candidate in the 2011 New Jersey General Assembly election.

New Jersey General Assembly
Preceded by Dawn Addiego	New Jersey State Assemblyman - District 8 December 13, 2010 - August 12, 2011	Succeeded by Gerry Nardello
