= Maria Rodriguez-Gregg =

American politician

Member of the New Jersey General Assembly from the 8th Legislative District
- In office January 14, 2014 – January 9, 2018
- Preceded by: Scott Rudder
- Succeeded by: Ryan Peters

Personal details
- Born: Maria Rodriguez; September 29, 1981 (age 45) Willingboro Township, New Jersey, U.S.
- Party: Republican
- Education: B.A. Rutgers University–Camden (economics)

Maria Rodriguez-Gregg (born September 29, 1981) is a former American Republican Party politician who served in the New Jersey General Assembly from 2014 to 2018 representing the 8th Legislative District. She succeeded Scott Rudder to become the first Republican Hispanic woman to be elected to the New Jersey Legislature.

== Early life and education ==
Rodriguez-Gregg is of Puerto Rican descent. She grew up in Willingboro Township and Burlington, New Jersey. Both of her parents served in the military.

Rodriguez-Gregg served as president of the Burlington County Young Republicans. She worked in the dental field as a dental assistant, was an instructor in the dental assisting program at the Burlington County Institute of Technology and managed dental offices.

She serves on the board of trustees for Burlington County College, was on the board of directors for Habitat for Humanity of Burlington County for two years, and is a member of the Civil Air Patrol. In 2013, she graduated from Rutgers University-Camden with a bachelor's degree in economics.

== Career ==
The Burlington County Republicans suggested to Rodriguez-Gregg that she should run for the Assembly in the 2013 elections to succeed Scott Rudder, who was retiring. She and incumbent Christopher J. Brown were endorsed by the Republican Party and defeated two challengers affiliated with the Tea Party movement in the June primary election. Rodriguez-Gregg and Brown both won in the general election in November, and she became the first Republican Hispanic woman to serve in the New Jersey Legislature.

In the 2016 United States Presidential election, Rodriguez-Gregg, then New Jersey's only Republican Hispanic state lawmaker, declined to endorse Republican presidential nominee Donald Trump, stating, "I think it's my whole life experience that leads me to not being able to support him."

=== Arrest and aftermath ===
On April 28, 2017, Rodriguez-Gregg was arrested following a traffic accident in which her car, while stopped at a traffic light, was struck in the rear bumper by another vehicle. Rodriguez-Gregg was charged with driving while intoxicated (marijuana and/or alcohol), obstruction of justice (for refusing a field sobriety test), reckless driving and a marked lanes' violation. The other driver was charged with careless driving. Both drivers were treated for minor injuries.

Four months after her arrest, Rodriguez-Gregg withdrew from her campaign seeking re-election in the upcoming November 2017 New Jersey election. The following month, local media outlets obtained and released body camera video footage of the arrest.

Rodriguez-Gregg has maintained her innocence. No marijuana or alcohol was found by police in her vehicle. According to her attorney, Rodriguez-Gregg's blood test showed "some indication of alcohol", or a presence of alcohol, but no marijuana. In December 2017, the court denied Rodriguez-Gregg's motions to suppress evidence collected by the police and dismiss the charges against her.

In January 2018, Rodriguez-Gregg claimed that she was a survivor of domestic abuse that had been occurring at the time of her arrest. In a Facebook post and several media interviews, Rodriguez-Gregg shared details of her alleged abuse and photographs of her face with multiple bruises and urged support for pending legislation that strengthened penalties for domestic violence. In response, some local media outlets described Rodriguez-Gregg as "courageous" for publicly discussing her domestic violence abuse.

In 2022, Governor Phil Murphy appointed Rodriguez-Gregg as a Republican member of the New Jersey Board of Public Utilities, but the nomination was withdrawn after a hold was placed on it in the State Senate.

== Personal life ==
Rodriguez-Gregg lives in Evesham Township, New Jersey. She is a player for a roller derby team called the "Dishonor Roll" and She-Devils Travel Team in the Penn Jersey Roller Derby league, where she goes by the name "Honeybee".

New Jersey General Assembly
| Preceded by Scott Rudder | Member of the New Jersey General Assembly for the 8th District; January 14, 2014 – January 9, 2018; With: Christopher J. Brown, Joe Howarth | Succeeded by Ryan Peters |
