= Joe Howarth (politician) =

American politician

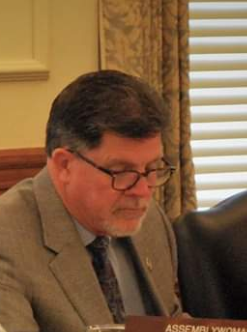

Member of the New Jersey General Assembly from the 8th District
- In office January 12, 2016 – January 14, 2020
- Preceded by: Christopher J. Brown
- Succeeded by: Jean Stanfield

Member of the Burlington County Board of Chosen Freeholders
- In office January 1, 2012 – January 1, 2015
- Preceded by: Mary Anne Reinhart
- Succeeded by: Mary Ann O’Brien

Personal details
- Born: August 27, 1955 (age 70)
- Party: Republican
- Occupation: Special education paraprofessional
- Website: Legislative Website

Joseph Howarth Jr. (born August 27, 1955) is an American Republican Party politician who represented the 8th Legislative District in the New Jersey General Assembly since he was sworn into office on January 12, 2016. Howarth lost re-election in the 2019 GOP primary. He left office on January 14, 2020.

== Early life ==
A resident of Evesham Township, Howarth received a bachelor's degree from Trenton State College (now The College of New Jersey) with a major in health and physical education. He has worked for the Lenape Regional High School District as a special education paraprofessional.

== Burlington County Politics ==
Howarth served on the Board of Education of the Evesham Township School District from 2003 to 2007 and on the Evesham Township Council from 2009 to 2011. He was elected to the Burlington County Board of Chosen Freeholders and was sworn into office on January 3, 2012, as part of an all-Republican board. Howarth chose not to run for re-election in 2014 after serving a single term as a freeholder in order to allow himself an opportunity to take care of personal health issues.

== New Jersey Assembly ==
Howarth was elected to the Assembly in November 2015 after Assemblyman Christopher J. Brown announced his retirement.

In September 2017, after two-term incumbent Maria Rodriguez-Gregg decided against running for election after an incident earlier that year in which police thought that she was driving under the influence following a traffic accident, the Burlington County Republican Committee chose Burlington County Freeholder Ryan Peters to run for the Assembly seat as Howarth's running mate.

In the November 2017 general election, Howarth (with 28,841; 25.1% of all ballots cast) and Peters (with 28,671 votes; 25.0%), defeated Democratic challengers Joanne Schwartz (28,321; 24.7%) and Maryann Merlino (28,196; 24.6%) to win both Assembly seats from the district for the Republicans. With Joanne Schwartz, the closest Democratic candidate 350 votes behind Peters, the Democratic Party had considered filing for a recount. Of all 40 districts, the race in the 8th District was the closest in the state, with 650 votes separating the first and fourth vote-getters.

After the 8th District's Senator Dawn Addiego switched her party affiliation from Republican to Democrat in early 2019, Howarth allegedly attempted to do the same. The Burlington County Republican Party dropped its support for Howarth, choosing to instead support Burlington County Sheriff Jean Stanfield to run with incumbent Ryan Peters.

In the primary election where he heavily tied himself to President Donald Trump, Howarth was defeated by Stanfield.

=== Tenure ===
The following Monday after Howarth's defeat, his nameplates were missing from the GOP caucus room, fueling speculation he would switch parties or resign, however neither happened. Later that month, he proposed a bill that would take the pay away from legislators who are absent from a session.

=== Committee assignments ===
- Law and Public Safety
- Tourism, Gaming, and the Arts

== District 8 ==
New Jersey's 8th Legislative District encompasses parts of Burlington County, Camden County, and Atlantic County, New Jersey. The representatives from the 8th district to the 218th New Jersey Legislature were:

- Senator Dawn Marie Addiego (D)
- Assemblyman Joe Howarth (R)
- Assemblyman Ryan Peters (R)

== Electoral history ==
=== General Assembly ===
2019 Republican primary
| Party | Candidate | Votes | % |
|---|---|---|---|
| Republican | Jean Stanfield | 5,435 | 35.02 |
| Republican | Ryan Peters (incumbent) | 5,360 | 34.54 |
| Republican | Joe Howarth (incumbent) | 2,744 | 17.68 |
| Republican | R. Jason Huf | 1,980 | 12.76 |
| Total votes | | 15,519 | 100 |

New Jersey general election, 2017
| Party | Candidate | Votes | % | ±% |
|---|---|---|---|---|
| Republican | Joe Howarth (Incumbent) | 28,841 | 25.1 | ▼24.8 |
| Republican | Ryan Peters | 28,671 | 25.0 | ▼25.1 |
| Democratic | Joanne Schwartz | 28,321 | 24.7 | ▲24.7 |
| Democratic | Maryann Merlino | 28,196 | 24.6 | ▲24.6 |
| No Status Quo | Ryan T. Calhoun | 753 | 0.7 | ▲0.7 |
| Total votes | | '114,782' | '100.0' | |

New Jersey general election, 2015
| Party | Candidate | Votes | % | ±% |
|---|---|---|---|---|
| Republican | Maria Rodriguez-Gregg (Incumbent) | 18,317 | 50.1 | ▲20.9 |
| Republican | Joe Howarth | 18,234 | 49.9 | ▲18.9 |
| Total votes | | '36,551' | '100.0' | |

New Jersey General Assembly
| Preceded by Christopher J. Brown | Member of the New Jersey General Assembly for the 8th District; January 12, 2016 – present With: Maria Rodriguez-Gregg, Ryan Peters | Succeeded by Incumbent |
