= Tennille McCoy =

American politician (born 1977)

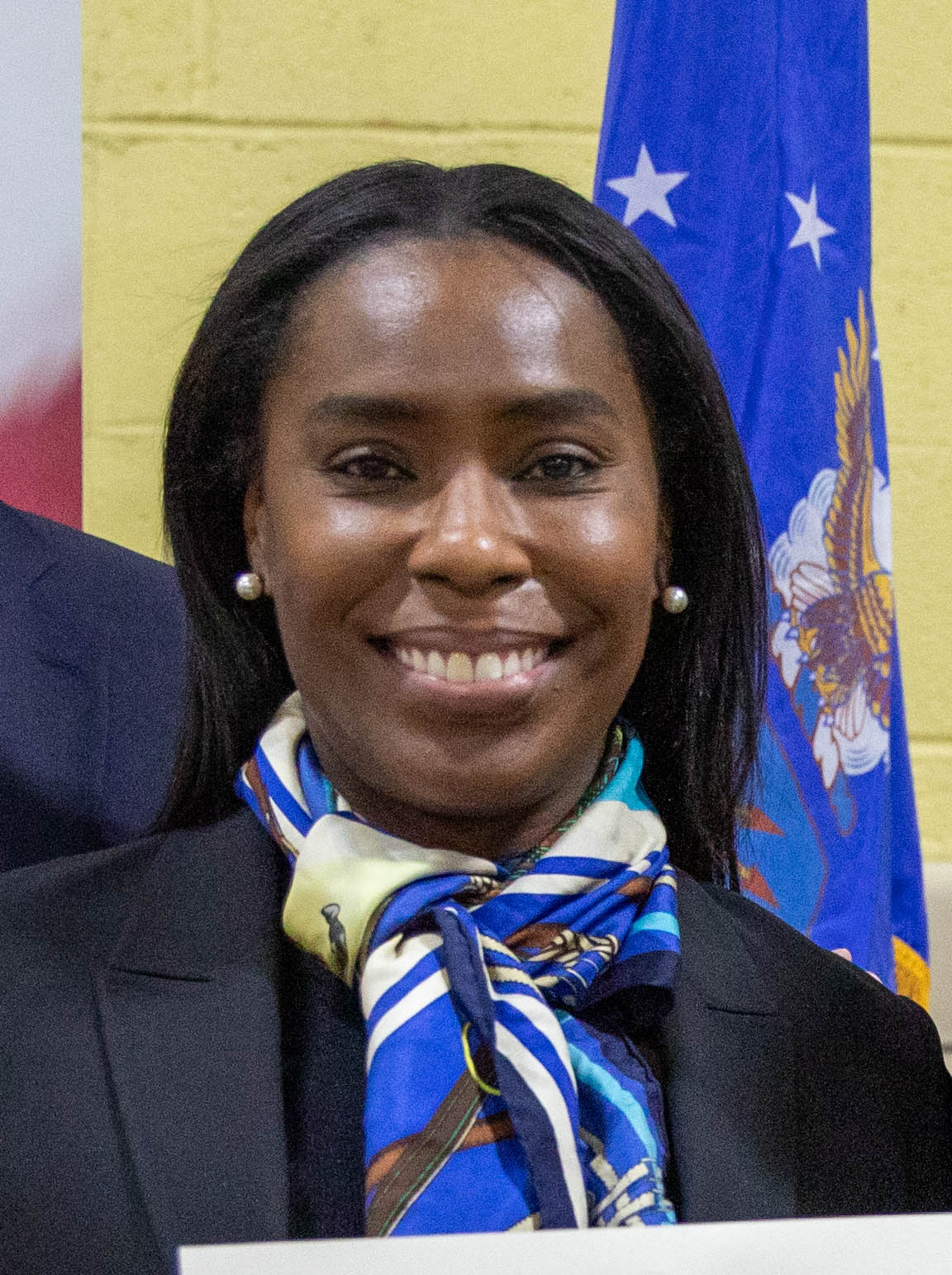
- McCoy in 2024

Member of the New Jersey General Assembly from the 14th district
- Incumbent
- Assumed office January 8, 2024 Serving with Wayne DeAngelo
- Preceded by: Daniel R. Benson

Personal details
- Born: June 21, 1977 (age 49)
- Party: Democratic
- Education: Virginia State University (BA); Rutgers University, New Brunswick (MA); New York University (MBA)
- Website: State Assembly website

Tennille R. McCoy (born June 21, 1977) is an American realtor, human resources executive and Democratic Party politician serving as a member of the New Jersey General Assembly for the 14th legislative district, having taken office on January 8, 2024. For the 2024-2025 legislative term, she is assigned to the Assembly Appropriations Committee, State and Local Government Committee, and Telecommunications and Utilities Committee.

== Biography ==
McCoy has been a resident of Hamilton Township, Mercer County, New Jersey, where she attended the local public schools. She received an undergraduate degree from Virginia State University and received a graduate degree from New York University Stern School of Business through the TRIUM EMBA program.

== Elective office ==
McCoy and her incumbent running mate Wayne DeAngelo defeated Republicans Adam J. Elias and Skye Gilmartin in the 2023 New Jersey General Assembly election. McCoy was one of 27 members elected for the first time to serve in the General Assembly. With her predecessor, Daniel R. Benson, resigning at the end of December 2023, McCoy was sworn into office on January 8, 2024, one day before the other 26 newcomers.

=== District 14 ===
Each of the 40 districts in the New Jersey Legislature has one representative in the New Jersey Senate and two members in the New Jersey General Assembly. The representatives from the 14th District for the 2024—2025 Legislative Session are:

- Senator Linda R. Greenstein (D)
- Assemblyman Wayne DeAngelo (D)
- Assemblywoman Tennille McCoy (D)

== Electoral history ==
14th Legislative District General Election, 2023
Party	Candidate	Votes	%
Democratic	Wayne P. DeAngelo (incumbent)	32,843	30.3
Democratic	Tennille McCoy	31,181	28.8
Republican	Adam Elias	22,223	20.5
Republican	Skye Gilmartin	22,174	20.5
Total votes		108,421	100.0
Democratic hold			
Democratic hold			
