= 2011 New Jersey elections =

- November 8, 2011

A general election was held in the U.S. state of New Jersey on November 8, 2011. Primary elections were held on June 7. The only state positions up in this election cycle were all 80 seats in the New Jersey General Assembly and all 40 seats in the Senate. In addition to the State Legislative elections, numerous county offices and freeholders in addition to municipal offices were up for election. There was one statewide ballot question, in which voters approved legislation to legalize gambling. Some counties and municipalities may have had local ballot questions. Non-partisan local elections, some school board elections, and some fire district elections also happened throughout the year.

== Legislature ==
=== Senate ===
2011 New Jersey Senate elections
- November 4, 2011

All 40 seats in the New Jersey State Senate 21 seats needed for a majority
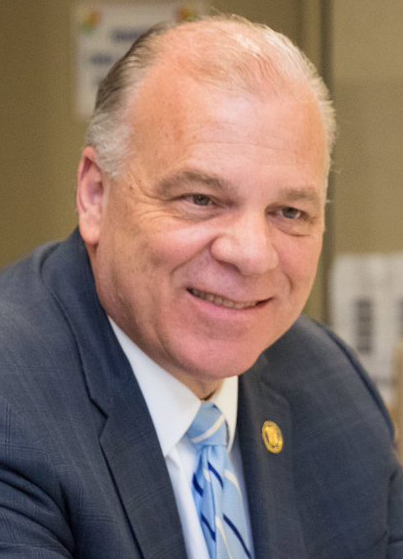

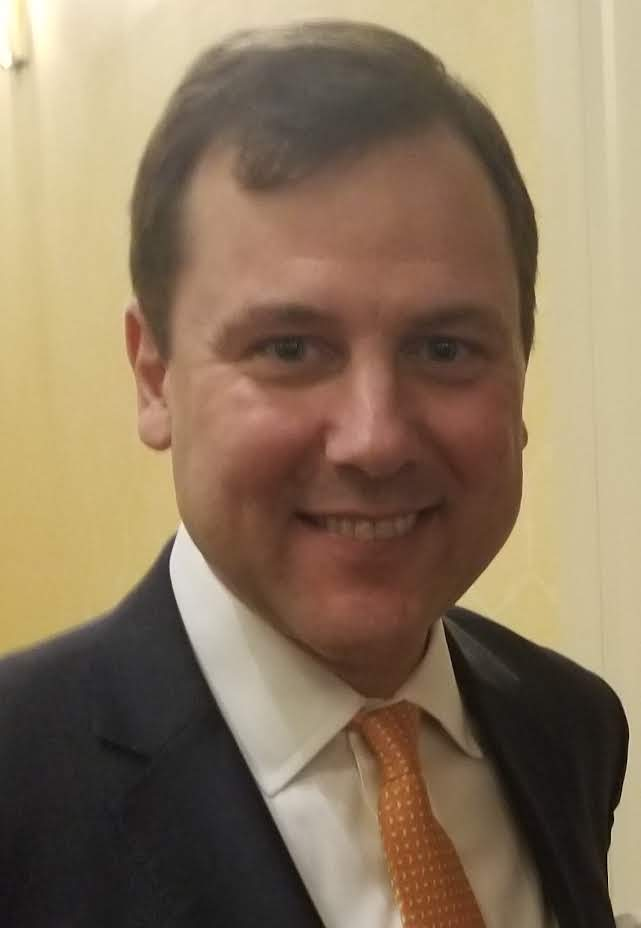
	Majority party	Minority party
Leader	Steve Sweeney	Tom Kean Jr.
Party	Democratic	Republican
Leader's seat	3rd	21st
Last election	23	17
Seats before	24	16
Seats won	24	16
Seat change	Steady	Steady
Popular vote	677,435	645,569
Percentage	51.1%	48.7%
- Results by district Democratic hold Republican hold
Senate President before election
Steve Sweeney
Democratic
Elected Senate President
Steve Sweeney
Democratic

The 2011 New Jersey State Senate elections were held on November 4. The election took place midway through Chris Christie's first term as Governor of New Jersey. No seats changed hands, though Democrats had gained one seat in a 2010 special election with Linda Greenstein's victory over Tom Goodwin.

This was the first election under maps drawn after the 2010 census. Three incumbents retired from the Senate including Sean Kean, who was redistricted into Jennifer Beck's district and ran for Assembly rather than challenge her.

=== General Assembly ===
New Jersey General Assembly Elections, 2011
- November 8, 2011

All 80 seats in the New Jersey General Assembly 41 seats needed for a majority
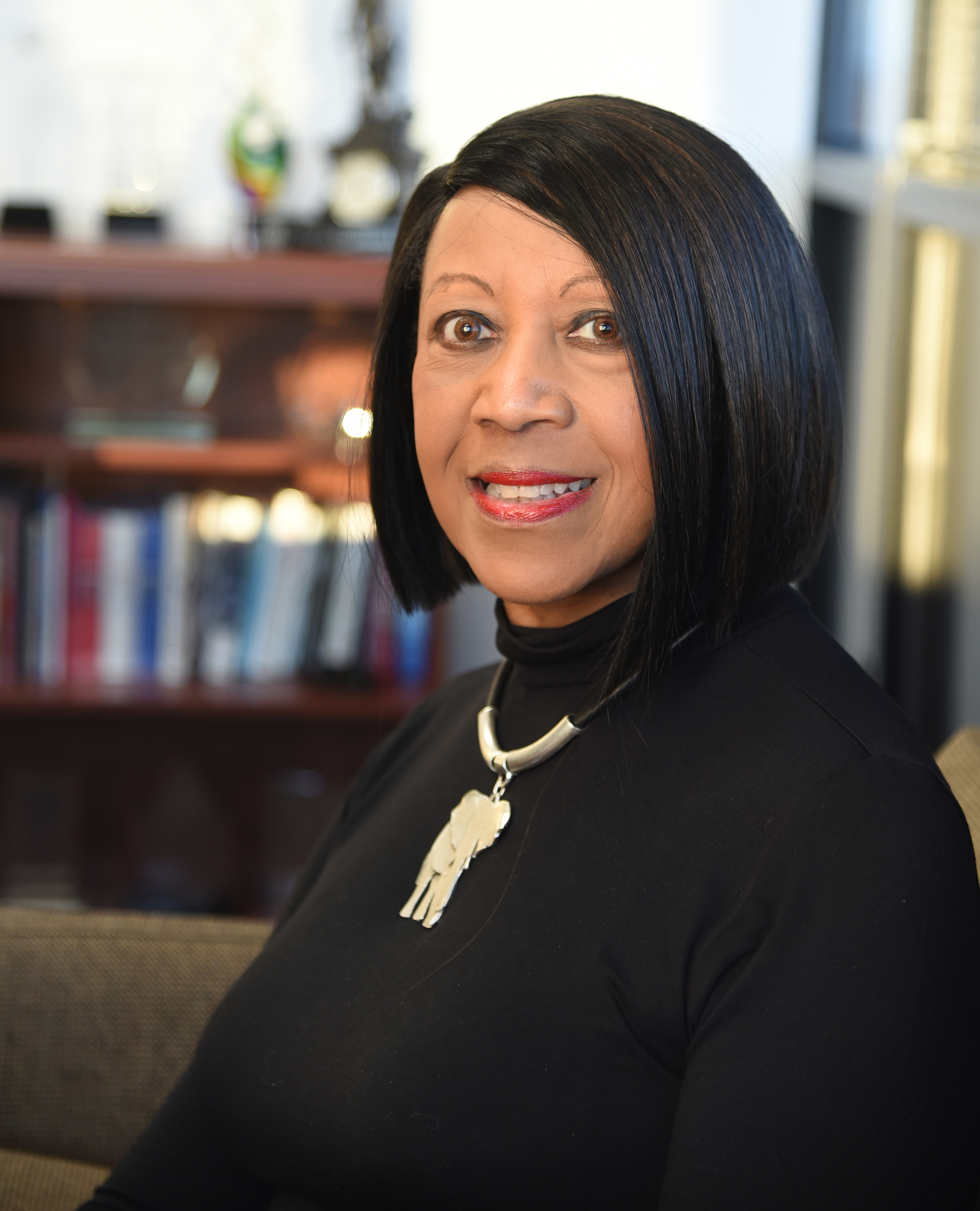

	Majority party	Minority party
Leader	Sheila Oliver	Alex DeCroce
Party	Democratic	Republican
Leader since	January 12, 2010	January 12, 2004
Leader's seat	34th (East Orange)	26th (Parisippany-Troy Hills)
Last election	47	33
Seats won	48	32
Seat change	▲1	▼1
Popular vote	1,339,201	1,253,824
Percentage	51.2%	48.0%
Swing	▲3.6%	▼3.9%
- Results: Democratic hold Democratic gain Republican hold
Speaker before election
Sheila Oliver
Democratic
Elected Speaker
Sheila Oliver
Democratic

All 80 seats in the General Assembly were up for election this year. In each Legislative district, there are two people elected; the top two winners in the general election are the ones sent to the Assembly. Typically, the two members of each party run as a team in each election. After the previous election, Democrats captured 47 seats while the Republicans won 33 seats. These were the first elections to be held after the 2010 redistricting cycle.

Democrats gained one seat, by flipping a seat in the 4th district, which they had only lost two years prior.

==== Overall results ====
Summary of the November 8, 2011 New Jersey General Assembly election results:

↓
48	32
Democratic	Republican

Parties	Candidates	Seats				Popular Vote		
Parties	Candidates	2009	2011	+/-	Strength	Vote	%	Change
Democratic	80	47	48	▲1	60%	1,339,201	51.2%	0.0%
Republican	79	33	32	▼1	40%	1,253,824	48.0%	0.0%
Green	2	0	0	Steady	0%	2,284	0.1%	0.0%
Libertarian	4	0	0	Steady	0%	3,692	0.1%	0.0%
Independent	10	0	0	Steady	0%	15,310	0.6%	0.0%
Total	176	80	80	0	100.0%	2,614,311	100.0%	-

== Ballot measures ==
One statewide question was on the ballot. It was approved by voters:

- Public Question Number 1, The measure amended the state constitution to allow the legislature to legalize betting on the results of professional, college, and amateur sporting events.

Question 1 Results by county Yes: 70–80%; 60–70%; 50–60%

Question 1

Choice	Votes	%
Yes ✓	671,797	63.9%
No ✗	379,339	36.1%
Total votes	1,051,136	100%
