= Murder of Megan Kanka =

1994 child murder in Hamilton, New Jersey, US

- Megan Kanka
- Location: Hamilton Township, Mercer County, New Jersey, U.S.
- Date: July 29, 1994; 32 years ago
- Attack type: Child murder by ligature strangulation, child rape, child abduction
- Victims: Megan Nicole Kanka, (aged 7)
- Perpetrator: Jesse K. Timmendequas
- Motive: Pedophilia
- Verdict: Guilty on all counts
- Convictions: First-degree murder; Felony murder (2 counts); First-degree kidnapping; First-degree aggravated sexual assault (4 counts)
- Sentence: Death (1997); commuted to life imprisonment without the possibility of parole (2007)

On July 29, 1994, in Hamilton Township, New Jersey, seven-year-old Megan Nicole Kanka was raped and murdered by her neighbor, Jesse Timmendequas, after he lured her into his house; Timmendequas had previously been convicted of child molestation. The murder attracted national attention and subsequently led to the introduction of "Megan's Law", which requires law enforcement to disclose details relating to the location of registered sex offenders.

In 1997, Timmendequas was convicted of Kanka's murder. He was initially sentenced to death, but his sentence was commuted to life without parole after New Jersey abolished capital punishment in 2007.

== Predator and Perpetrator ==
Jesse Timmendequas

Jesse K. Timmendequas (born April 15, 1961) had two previous convictions for sexually assaulting young girls. In 1979, when Timmendequas was 18-years old, he pleaded guilty to the attempted aggravated sexual assault of a five-year-old girl in Piscataway Township, New Jersey. Timmendequas was given a suspended sentence and, after failing to attend counseling, he was sent for nine months to the Middlesex Adult Correctional Center. In 1981 at age 20, Timmendequas pleaded guilty to the assault of a seven-year-old girl and was imprisoned at the Adult Diagnostic and Treatment Center (ADTC) in Avenel, New Jersey, for six years.

Timmendequas reportedly participated little in the treatment program offered at the ADTC. He was described by one therapist who treated him at the facility as a "whiner" who spent most of his time sleeping. Another therapist stated that she had believed that Timmendequas would eventually commit another sex crime (although she did not believe he would commit murder).

== Murder and trial ==
Timmendequas lured Kanka into his house, where he raped her before strangling her with a belt. Timmendequas then disposed Kanka's body in nearby Mercer County Park. The next day, he confessed to investigators and led police to the site.

Evidence included bloodstains, hair and fiber samples, as well as a bite mark matching Kanka's teeth on Timmendequas' hand. This led to guilty verdicts on all eight charges, including intentional murder, felony kidnapping, four counts of aggravated sexual assault, and two counts of felony murder—causing a death in the course of certain specific felonies. The court sentenced Timmendequas to death, and the sentence was upheld by the New Jersey Supreme Court on appeal. Congressman Dick Zimmer stated, "I believe he is exactly the kind of predator that the legislature had in mind when it enacted the death penalty."

Timmendequas remained on death row in New Jersey until December 17, 2007, when the New Jersey Legislature abolished capital punishment in the state. As a result, Timmendequas' sentence was commuted to life in prison without the possibility of parole.

== Megan's Law ==
One month after the murder, the New Jersey General Assembly passed a series of bills sponsored by Assemblyman Paul Kramer, at the behest of Megan's parents, that would require a sex offender registry with a database tracked by the state, community notification of registered sex offenders moving into a neighborhood, and then life in prison for second-time sex offenders. Kramer expressed incredulity at the controversy created by the bills, saying that "Megan Kanka would be alive today" if the bills he proposed had been law.

== Foundation ==
The Megan Nicole Kanka Foundation is a non-profit charity founded by the family of Megan Kanka with the intent of preventing crimes against children.

== See also ==
- List of kidnappings
- Murder of Sarah Payne, a 2000 crime in the United Kingdom that led to the creation of Sarah's Law, a more limited form of Megan's Law.
