= Linda R. Greenstein =

Member of the New Jersey Senate

Linda Greenstein
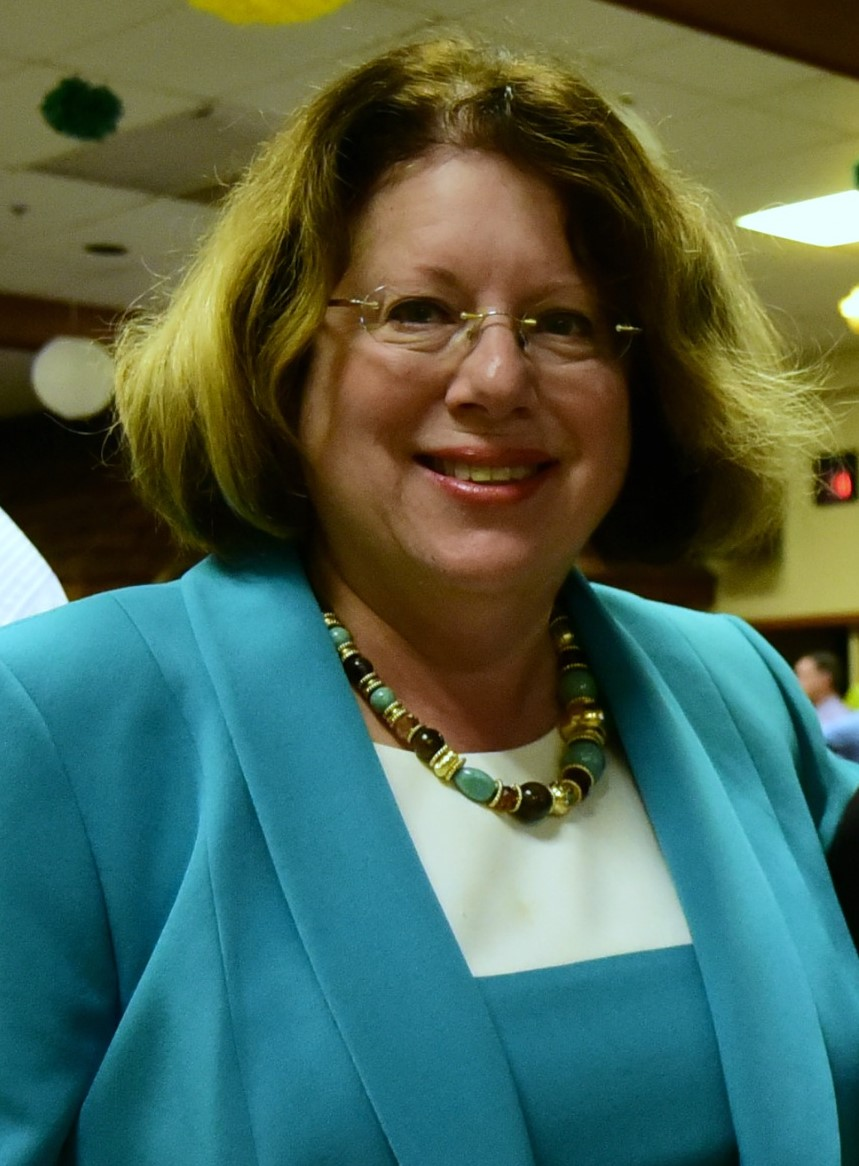

Member of the New Jersey Senate from the 14th district
- Incumbent
- Assumed office December 6, 2010
- Preceded by: Tom Goodwin

Member of the New Jersey General Assembly from the 14th district
- In office January 11, 2000 – December 6, 2010
- Preceded by: Paul Kramer; Barbara Wright
- Succeeded by: Daniel R. Benson

Personal details
- Born: June 7, 1950 (age 76) Brooklyn, New York, U.S.
- Party: Democratic
- Spouse: Michael Greenstein (d. 2017)
- Children: 1
- Education: Vassar College (AB); Johns Hopkins University (MA); Georgetown University (JD)
- Website: Legislative Website

Linda R. Greenstein (born June 7, 1950) is an American attorney and politician who has served since 2010 as a member of the New Jersey Senate representing the 14th legislative district. She previously served in the General Assembly from 2000 to 2010.

== Early life and education ==
Greenstein was born in the New York City borough of Brooklyn and graduated from Andrew Jackson High School in Queens. She received an A.B. from Vassar College in Psychology in 1971, an M.A. in 1974 from Johns Hopkins University and was awarded a J.D. in 1984 from the Georgetown University Law Center.

== Career ==
=== Early career ===
She was a Clinical Associate Professor at the Seton Hall University School of Law, where she supervised the Disability Law Clinic. She has served as a Deputy Attorney General in Trenton and as an Assistant District Attorney in Philadelphia.

Greenstein served on the Plainsboro Township Committee from 1995 to 2000 and on the West Windsor-Plainsboro Regional School District's Board of Education from 1992 to 1994. Prior to her election to the General Assembly, she was a Senior Staff Attorney at the Community Health Law Project and supervised the Public Interest Legal Clinic at Montclair State University.

=== New Jersey Assembly ===
In the 1999 Assembly election, Republican incumbents Paul Kramer and Barbara Wright were narrowly defeated by Democrats Greenstein and Gary Guear, with the incumbents losing votes in Hamilton Township, where Democrat Glen Gilmore won the race for mayor. The two gains were among the three Republicans seats Democrats picked up in the Assembly in the 1999 elections, though the Republicans retained their majority. She served in the Assembly for five terms from 2000 through 2010. She was the Assembly's Assistant Majority Leader from 2002, and the Deputy Speaker from 2006 to 2010. Greenstein served in the Assembly on the Judiciary Committee (as Chair) and the Health and Senior Services Committee. Greenstein was reelected in 2007 while participating in the New Jersey Clean Elections public funding program. During this campaign, Greenstein faced radio attack ads from a national third-party conservative group with ties to President George W. Bush.

=== 2008 presidential campaign ===
In 2008, Greenstein initially attempted to serve as a delegate for the Hillary Clinton campaign, but the Clinton campaign declined to nominate her. Greenstein endorsed Barack Obama's presidential campaign prior to the 2008 Iowa caucus. Greenstein worked as a campaign surrogate prior to the June primary and served as an Obama delegate to 2008 Democratic National Convention in Denver, Colorado.

=== New Jersey Senate ===
In the 2010 special Senate election to fill the remainder of Bill Baroni's term, Greenstein ran unopposed in the Democratic primary. She defeated appointed incumbent Senator Tom Goodwin, one of her opponents from the 2009 Assembly race.

In 2011, Greenstein was re-elected over challenger Richard Kanka, father of murder victim Megan Kanka and driver behind Megan's Law.

In 2013, Greenstein faced former State Senator Peter Inverso, who represented the district from 1992 to 2008. Greenstein was re-elected to a second full term by 1,484 votes, the closest Senate margin in New Jersey that year.

In 2017, her opponent was Hamilton Township Councilwoman Ileana Schirmer. Greenstein defeated Schirmer 56.3% to 43.7%.

==== Committees ====
Committee assignments for the 2024—2025 Legislative Session are:

- Law and Public Safety (as chair)
- Budget and Appropriations (as vice-chair)
- Environment and Energy (as vice-chair)

==== District 14 ====
Each of the 40 districts in the New Jersey Legislature has one representative in the New Jersey Senate and two members in the New Jersey General Assembly. The representatives from the 14th District for the 2024—2025 Legislative Session are:

- Senator Linda R. Greenstein (D)
- Assemblyman Wayne DeAngelo (D)
- Assemblywoman Tennille McCoy (D)

=== 2014 congressional election ===
In 2014, 12th congressional district Representative Rush D. Holt, Jr. announced his retirement from Congress. Greenstein announced that she would seek the Democratic nomination for the seat the same day of Holt's announcement.

Of the four counties in the district, she only received the county committee endorsement from her home county of Middlesex. After Assemblywoman Bonnie Watson Coleman received the Mercer County endorsement on March 22, Greenstein was recorded telling local county Democratic leaders, "I hate everybody in here. Everybody in here is my enemy – except for the people from Hamilton. The rest of you are my enemies." Her campaign responded to the leak with a statement saying, "This thinly veiled attempt at intimidation from unnamed party bosses unfortunately reeks of the kind of sexism successful women have had to contend with throughout history." Mercer County Democratic Party chairwoman Elizabeth Maher Muoio refuted this claim, saying "Clearly, the results were not what she had hoped for, but to blame them on sexism or on a closed process is deceptive, untrue and insulting."

In the Democratic primary held on June 3, Watson Coleman defeated Greenstein, Assemblyman Upendra J. Chivukula and scientist Andrew Zwicker.

Greenstein currently serves as chair of the Senate Law and Public Safety Committee and vice-chair of the Senate Budget and Appropriations Committee and Senate Environment and Energy Committee.

In 2026, Greenstein was a primary sponsor of the New Jersey Private Contractor Registration Act (S3564).

== Personal life ==
She is a resident of Plainsboro Township, and had one son Evan, with her husband Michael Greenstein. Michael Greenstein died on November 1, 2017.

== Electoral history ==
=== United States House of Representatives ===
2014 Democratic Primary - United States House of Representatives 12th District
Party	Candidate	Votes	%
Democratic	Bonnie Watson Coleman	15,603	43.0
Democratic	Linda Greenstein	10,089	27.8
Democratic	Upendra J. Chivukula	7,890	21.8
Democratic	Andrew Zwicker	2,668	7.4

=== New Jersey Senate ===
14th Legislative District General Election, 2023
Party	Candidate	Votes	%
Democratic	Linda R. Greenstein (incumbent)	33,020	59.8
Republican	Patricia "Pat" Johnson	22,225	40.2
Total votes		55,245	100.0
Democratic hold			

14th Legislative District general election, 2021
Party	Candidate	Votes	%
Democratic	Linda R. Greenstein (incumbent)	40,735	55.16
Republican	Adam J. Elias	33,116	44.84
Total votes		73,851	100.0
Democratic hold			

New Jersey general election, 2017
Party	Candidate	Votes	%	±%
Democratic	Linda R. Greenstein	34,474	56.5	▲6.1
Republican	Ileana Schirmer	26,548	43.5	▼4.5
Total votes		'61,022'	'100.0'	

New Jersey State Senate elections, 2013
Party	Candidate	Votes	%	±%
Democratic	Linda R. Greenstein (incumbent)	31,387	50.4%	▼4.9
Republican	Peter A. Inverso	29,903	48.0%	▲3.3
Libertarian	Don Dezarn	1,014	1.6%	N/A
Democratic hold		Swing	{{{swing}}}	

New Jersey State Senate elections, 2011
Party	Candidate	Votes	%
Democratic	Linda R. Greenstein (incumbent)	26,206	55.3
Republican	Richard J. Kanka	21,176	44.7
Democratic hold			

New Jersey State Senate Special elections, 2010
Party	Candidate	Votes	%
Democratic	Linda R. Greenstein	36,411	53.8
Republican	Tom Goodwin (incumbent)	31,311	46.2
Democratic gain from Republican			

=== New Jersey Assembly ===
New Jersey general election, 2009
Party	Candidate	Votes	%	±%
Democratic	Linda R. Greenstein	37,958	28.2	▲1.1
Democratic	Wayne DeAngelo	35,791	26.6	▲2.6
Republican	Rob Calabro	30,479	22.6	▼0.7
Republican	William T. Harvey, Jr.	29,530	21.9	▼0.8
Modern Whig	Gene L. Baldassari	859	0.6	N/A
Total votes		'134,617'	'100.0'	

New Jersey general election, 2007
Party	Candidate	Votes	%	±%
Democratic	Linda R. Greenstein	28,266	27.1	▲0.4
Democratic	Wayne P. DeAngelo	25,119	24.0	▲1.7
Republican	Thomas Goodwin	24,298	23.3	▼4.4
Republican	Adam Bushman	23,711	22.7	▲0.4
Libertarian	Jason M. Scheurer	1,775	1.7	▲1.2
Libertarian	Ray F. Cragle	1,308	1.3	▲0.8
Total votes		'104,477'	'100.0'	

New Jersey general election, 2005
Party	Candidate	Votes	%	±%
Republican	Bill Baroni	37,241	27.7	▼0.2
Democratic	Linda R. Greenstein	35,816	26.7	▲1.2
Democratic	Daniel R. Benson	29,914	22.3	▲0.2
Republican	Michael D. Paquette	29,899	22.3	▼2.2
Libertarian	William Hunsicker	725	0.5	N/A
Libertarian	Jason M. Scheurer	714	0.5	N/A
Total votes		'134,309'	'100.0'	

New Jersey general election, 2003
Party	Candidate	Votes	%	±%
Republican	Bill Baroni	27,181	27.9	▲4.7
Democratic	Linda R. Greenstein	24,752	25.5	▼2.0
Republican	Sidna B. Mitchell	23,872	24.5	▲1.5
Democratic	Gary Guear	21,448	22.1	▼4.2
Total votes		'97,253'	'100.0'	

New Jersey general election, 2001
Party	Candidate	Votes	%
Democratic	Linda R. Greenstein	32,878	27.5
Democratic	Gary Guear	31,469	26.3
Republican	Barbara Wright	27,803	23.2
Republican	Paul Kramer	27,563	23.0
Total votes		119,713	100.0

New Jersey general election, 1999
Party	Candidate	Votes	%	±%
Democratic	Linda R. Greenstein	25,219	25.4	▲2.3
Democratic	Gary Guear	25,214	25.4	▲2.6
Republican	Paul R. Kramer	24,769	25.0	▼1.2
Republican	Barbara W. Wright	23,981	24.2	▼1.8
Total votes		'99,183'	'100.0'	

New Jersey Senate
Preceded by Tom Goodwin	New Jersey State Senator - District 14; December 6, 2010 - present	Succeeded by Incumbent
New Jersey General Assembly
Preceded by Paul Kramer; Barbara Wright	Member of the New Jersey General Assembly for the 14th District; January 11, 2000 – December 6, 2010; With: Gary Guear, Bill Baroni, Wayne DeAngelo	Succeeded by Daniel R. Benson
