= Scott Rudder =

American politician

Member of the New Jersey General Assembly from the 8th district
- In office January 8, 2008 – January 2014
- Preceded by: Francis L. Bodine; Larry Chatzidakis
- Succeeded by: Maria Rodriguez-Gregg

Personal details
- Born: August 19, 1969 (age 57)
- Party: Republican
- Children: 3
- Education: West Virginia University
- Occupation: Manager - Business Development at Lockheed Martin

Scott Rudder (born August 19, 1969) is an American Republican politician, who had served in the New Jersey General Assembly from January 2008 to January 2014, where he represented the 8th legislative district.

Rudder received a B.A. from West Virginia University, with a major in Political Science.

Rudder started his career working for Congressman Jim Saxton on military and veterans' issues in Washington, D.C. He later worked in the administration of Governor Christine Todd Whitman, as well as for New Jersey State Assembly Speaker Jack Collins in the Assembly Republican office. Rudder had served on the Medford Township Council from 1998 to 2008, serving as Mayor or Deputy Mayor for six out of those ten years. He served in the New Jersey Army National Guard from 1996 to 2000 and currently works as a manager of business development at Lockheed Martin.

Rudder served in the Assembly on the Environment and Solid Waste Committee and the Transportation, Public Works and Independent Authorities Committee. From 2011 to the end of his tenure in the Assembly, he served as an Assistant Republican Leader.

In March 2009, Rudder, along with fellow Assembly member Dawn Marie Addiego, voluntarily took a 10% cut from his legislative salary in light of New Jersey's economic crisis. Rudder and Addiego have also introduced legislation requiring all legislators take a 10% cut in salary. A legal opinion from the New Jersey Office of Legislative Services found that they were the first lawmakers in New Jersey history to ask to waive part of their salary. Rudder has also declined to take part in the State Health Benefits program, as he does not believe taxpayers should pay for health costs of legislators.

After sources speculated that the Burlington County Republican Organization would not back him for a fourth term, Rudder announced that he would not seek reelection in 2013. He was succeeded by Maria Rodriguez-Gregg.

New Jersey General Assembly
Preceded by Francis L. Bodine; Larry Chatzidakis	Member of the New Jersey General Assembly for the 8th District; January 8, 2008 – January 14, 2014; With: Dawn Marie Addiego, Pat Delany, Gerry Nardello, Christopher J. Brown	Succeeded by Maria Rodriguez-Gregg
