= Daniel R. Benson =

Member of the New Jersey General Assembly

Dan Benson

County Executive of Mercer County
- Incumbent
- Assumed office January 4, 2024
- Preceded by: Brian Hughes

Member of the New Jersey General Assembly from the 14th district
- In office January 10, 2011 – December 31, 2023
- Preceded by: Linda R. Greenstein
- Succeeded by: Tennille McCoy

Member of the Mercer County Board of Chosen Freeholders
- In office March 18, 2008 – January 10, 2011
- Preceded by: Elizabeth Maher Muoio
- Succeeded by: Samuel Frisby

Personal details
- Born: November 22, 1975 (age 50) Trenton, New Jersey, U.S.
- Party: Democratic
- Spouse: Hande Yurttan
- Education: Georgetown University (BS); Rutgers University, New Brunswick (MPP)
- Website: State Assembly website

Daniel R. Benson (born November 22, 1975) is an American Democratic Party politician who is the current Mercer County Executive and a former member of the New Jersey General Assembly representing the 14th Legislative District. Benson, who previously served on the Mercer County Board of Chosen Freeholders, replaced Assemblywoman Linda R. Greenstein, after she was elected to the New Jersey Senate in a special election. He was sworn in on January 10, 2011, to fill Greenstein's vacant Assembly seat.

== Early life and education ==
Benson received a B.S degree from Georgetown University, studying physics and government, and a Master of Public Policy degree from Rutgers University's Edward J. Bloustein School of Planning and Public Policy, studying science and technology policy. He was elected to the Hamilton Township Council in 2002, becoming the youngest elected councilman in township history. He served on the council until 2005, when he gave up his seat to run for the New Jersey General Assembly. Benson lost the Assembly race, finishing behind the incumbents, Republican Bill Baroni and Democrat Linda R. Greenstein.

== Mercer County Board of Chosen Freeholders ==
In 2008, Benson was appointed to a seat on the Mercer County Board of Chosen Freeholders by county Democrats, replacing Elizabeth Maher Muoio who took on a county job. He won a special election in November 2008 to complete the remainder of Muoio's term and was re-elected to a full three-year term in 2009.

== New Jersey Assembly ==
When Assemblywoman Greenstein won a special election to fill the remainder of Baroni's Senate term in November 2010, Benson ran for the vacant Assembly seat. On January 8, 2011, Benson was selected by a Democratic convention of Mercer and Middlesex counties (the counties that compose the 14th District) to replace Greenstein. He was sworn in on January 10, 2011. He resigned on December 31, 2023, after being elected Mercer County Executive, allowing his successor Tennille McCoy to take office early.

=== Committees ===
- Transportation and Independent Authorities
- Budget
- Health and Senior Services

=== District 14 ===
Each of the 40 districts in the New Jersey Legislature has one representative in the New Jersey Senate and two members in the New Jersey General Assembly. The representatives from the 14th District for the 2022—23 Legislative Session are:

- Senator Linda R. Greenstein (D)
- Assemblyman Daniel R. Benson (D)
- Assemblyman Wayne DeAngelo (D)

== Electoral history ==
=== New Jersey Assembly ===
New Jersey general election, 2017
Party	Candidate	Votes	%	±%
Democratic	Wayne DeAngelo	35,596	30.0	▼0.2
Democratic	Daniel R. Benson	35,088	29.6	▲0.9
Republican	Kristian Stout	24,725	20.9	▲1.3
Republican	Steven Uccio	23,106	19.5	▲0.6
Total votes		'118,515'	'100.0'	

New Jersey general election, 2015
Party	Candidate	Votes	%	±%
Democratic	Wayne DeAngelo	22,319	30.2	▲3.2
Democratic	Daniel R. Benson	21,187	28.7	▲2.7
Republican	David C. Jones	14,474	19.6	▼4.0
Republican	Philip R. Kaufman	13,937	18.9	▼3.1
Green	Joann Cousin	1,028	1.4	N/A
Green	Steven Welzer	957	1.3	N/A
Total votes		'73,902'	'100.0'	

New Jersey general election, 2013
Party	Candidate	Votes	%	±%
Democratic	Wayne DeAngelo	32,048	27.0	▼2.0
Democratic	Daniel R. Benson	30,992	26.0	▼2.0
Republican	Steve Cook	28,135	23.6	▲2.7
Republican	Ronald Haas	26,233	22.0	▲1.2
Libertarian	Sean O’Connor	898	0.8	N/A
Libertarian	Steven Uccio	779	0.7	N/A
Total votes		'119,085'	'100.0'	

New Jersey general election, 2011
Party	Candidate	Votes	%
Democratic	Wayne DeAngelo	26,626	29.0
Democratic	Daniel R. Benson	25,662	28.0
Republican	Sheree McGowan	19,135	20.9
Republican	Wayne Wittman	19,100	20.8
Green	Steven Welzer	1,189	1.3
Total votes		91,712	100.0

New Jersey general election, 2005
Party	Candidate	Votes	%	±%
Republican	Bill Baroni	37,241	27.7	▼0.2
Democratic	Linda R. Greenstein	35,816	26.7	▲1.2
Democratic	Daniel R. Benson	29,914	22.3	▲0.2
Republican	Michael D. Paquette	29,899	22.3	▼2.2
Libertarian	William Hunsicker	725	0.5	N/A
Libertarian	Jason M. Scheurer	714	0.5	N/A
Total votes		'134,309'	'100.0'	
