= Megan's Law =

United States federal law

- Long title: To amend the Violent Crime Control and Law Enforcement Act of 1994 to require the release of relevant information to protect the public from sexually violent offenders.
- Enacted by: the 104th United States Congress

Citations
- Public law: Pub.L. 104-145

Codification
- Acts amended: Violent Crime Control and Law Enforcement Act of 1994
- Titles amended: 42
- U.S.C. sections created: § 13701 note
- U.S.C. sections amended: § 14071 et seq.

Legislative history
- Introduced in the House as H.R.2137 by Dick Zimmer (R–NJ) on July 27, 1995; Passed the House on May 7, 1996 (unanimous voice vote); Passed the Senate on May 9, 1996 (unanimous voice vote); Signed into law by President Bill Clinton on May 17, 1996

Megan's Law is the name for a federal law (and informal name for similar state laws) in the United States requiring law enforcement authorities to make information available to the public regarding registered sex offenders. Laws were created in response to the murder of Megan Kanka, who was raped and murdered by her neighbour, Jesse Timmendequas, who was a previously-convicted child sex offender. Federal Megan's Law was enacted as a subsection of the Jacob Wetterling Crimes Against Children and Sexually Violent Offender Registration Act of 1994, which merely required sex offenders to register with local law enforcement. Because only a few states required registration prior to Megan's death, the state-level legislation to bring states in compliance—with both the registration requirement of Jacob Wetterling Act and community notification required by federal Megan's Law—were crafted simultaneously and are often referred to as "Megan's Laws" of individual states. Thus, the federal Megan's Law refers to community notification (making registry information public), whereas state-level "Megan's Law" may refer to both sex offender registration and community notification.

Individual states decide what information will be made available and how it should be spread. For example, they can spread the information via social media platforms such as Facebook. Commonly included information is the offender's name, picture, address, incarceration date, and offense of conviction. The information is often displayed on free public websites, but can be published in newspapers, distributed in pamphlets, or through various other means.

At the federal level, Megan's Law requires persons convicted of sex crimes against children to notify local law enforcement of any change of address or employment after release from custody (prison or psychiatric facility). The notification requirement may be imposed for a fixed period of time—usually at least ten years—or permanently. Some states may legislate registration for all sex crimes, even if no minors were involved. It is a felony in most jurisdictions to fail to register or fail to update information.

Together, the Wetterling Act and Megan's Law provide two major information services: sex offender registry for law enforcement, and community notification for the public. The details of what is provided as part of sex offender registration and how community notification is handled vary from state to state, and in some states the required registration information and community notification protocols have changed many times since Megan's Law was passed. The Adam Walsh Child Protection and Safety Act supplements Megan's Law with new registration requirements and a three-tier system for classifying sex offenders according to certain listed offenses requiring registration.

== History ==
Before Megan's Law, the federal Jacob Wetterling Act of 1994 required each state to create a registry for sexual offenders and certain other offenses against children. Under the Wetterling Act, registry information was kept for law enforcement use only, although law enforcement agencies were allowed to release the information of specific persons when deemed necessary to protect the public. After the high-profile rape and murder of seven-year-old Megan Kanka in Hamilton Township, Mercer County, New Jersey by Jesse Timmendequas, a sex offender with two previous convictions of sex crimes against small children who resided across the street from Megan, her parents Richard and Maureen Kanka worked to change the law by demanding mandatory community notification of sex offenders, arguing that the registration required under the Jacob Wetterling Act was not a sufficient protection measure. They said that Megan would still be alive had they known of the criminal history of Timmendequas. Paul Kramer sponsored a package of seven bills known as Megan's Law in the New Jersey General Assembly in 1994. 89 days after Megan was murdered, New Jersey enacted Megan's Law, which required sex offender registration, with a database tracked by the state, and whereabouts of high-risk sex offenders moving into a neighborhood to be made public. Before Megan's death, only five states required sex offenders to register with local law enforcement as required in the Jacob Wetterling Act.

The New Jersey law became model for federal legislation, introduced in the House of Representatives by Congressman Dick Zimmer. On May 17, 1996, President Clinton signed federal Megan's Law, an amendment to the Jacob Wetterling Act, that set the guidelines for the state statutes, requiring states to notify the public, although officials could decide how much public notification is necessary, based on the level of danger posed by an offender.

=== International Megan's Law ===
International Megan's Law to Prevent Child Exploitation and Other Sexual Crimes Through Advanced Notification of Traveling Sex Offenders was signed into a law by President Obama on February 8, 2016. International Megan's Law requires the notification to foreign governments when a citizen of the United States who is registered as a sex offender for sexual offense involving a minor is going to be traveling to their country. The law requires a visual "unique identifier" to be placed on the passports of covered registrants and requires offenders to notify law enforcement 21 days before traveling abroad. The law was challenged shortly after being enacted.

== Public notification ==
States differ with respect to public disclosure of offenders. In some states all sex offenders are subject to public notification through Megan's Law websites. However, in others, only information on high-risk offenders is publicly available, and the complete lists are withheld for law enforcement only. Under federal SORNA tier I registrants may be excluded from public disclosure, with exemption of those convicted of "specified offense against a minor." Since SORNA merely sets the minimum standards the states must follow, many SORNA compliant states disclose information of all tiers. These disparities have prompted some registrants to move into states with less strict rules.

== Criticism ==
Evidence to support the effectiveness of public sex offender registries is limited and mixed. Majority of research results do not find statistically significant shift in sexual offense trends following the implementation of sex offender registration and notification (SORN) regimes. A few studies indicate that sexual recidivism may have been lowered by SORN policies, while a few have found statistically significant increase in sex crimes following SORN implementation. According to the Office of Justice Programs' SMART Office, sex offender registration and notification requirements arguably have been implemented in the absence of empirical evidence regarding their effectiveness.

Opponents of Megan's Law, like Women Against Registry, National Association for Rational Sexual Offense Laws, and Human Rights Watch, have called the law overbroad and an invitation to vigilante violence.

Treatment professionals such as ATSA criticize the lack of evidence of the laws' effectiveness, the automatic inclusion of offenders on the registry without determining the risk of re-offense (by applying scientifically validated risk assessment tools), the scientifically unsupported popular belief in high recidivism, and the counter-effectiveness of the laws, which can actually undermine, rather than improve public safety by exacerbating factors (e.g. unemployment, instability) that may lead to recidivism. In addition, civil rights and reformist organizations highlight the adverse collateral effects on the family members of registrants, and question the fairness of the registries as indefinite punishment, and when applied to certain offender groups, such as juveniles and young adults engaging in consensual acts. Some victims' rights advocates like Patty Wetterling have presented similar critique.

== See also ==
- Sex offender registry
- Jessica's Law
- Sarah's Law
- Clare's Law
