= Wayne DeAngelo =

Member of the New Jersey General Assembly

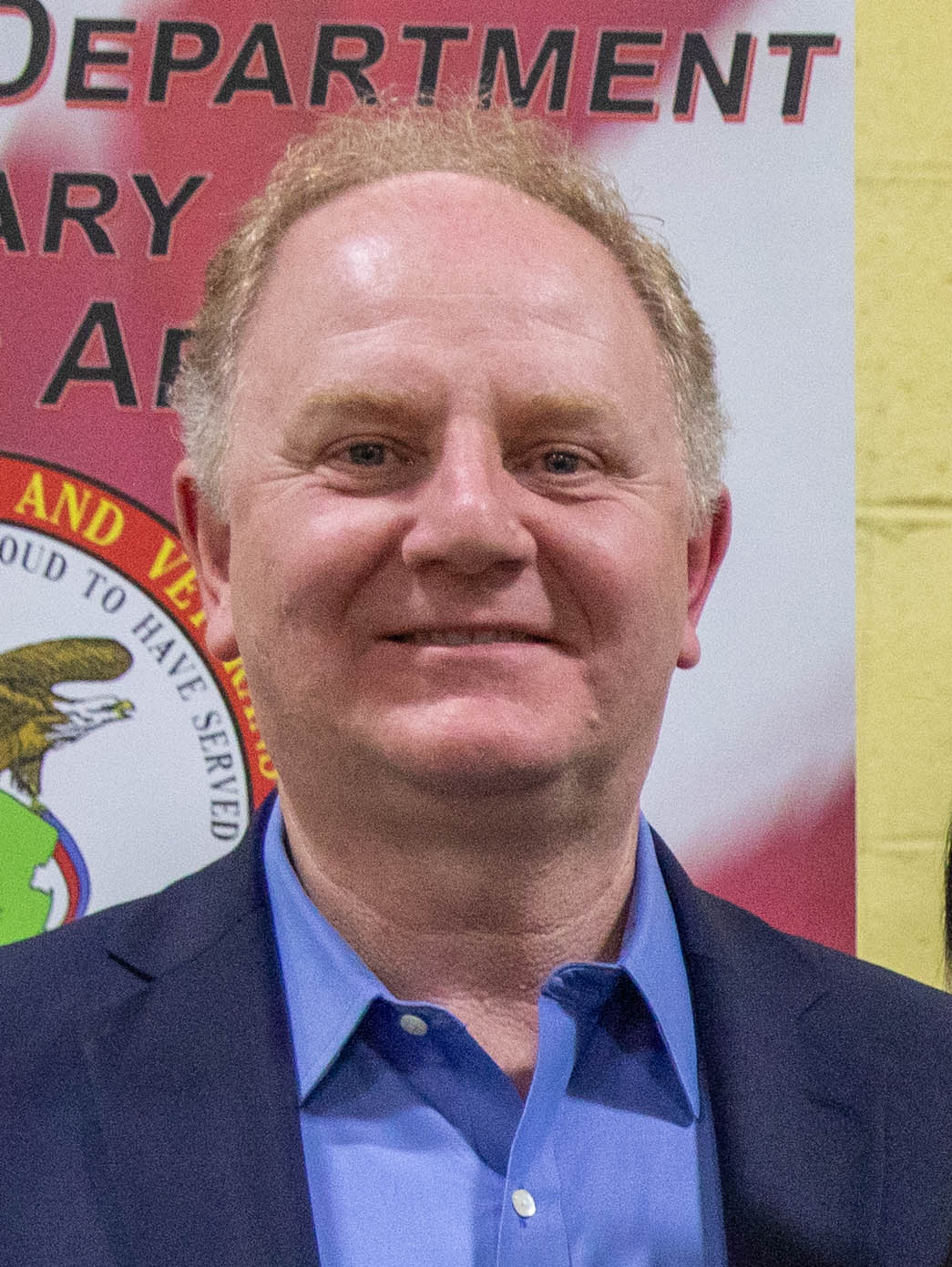

Member of the New Jersey General Assembly from the 14th district
- Incumbent
- Assumed office January 8, 2008 Serving with Tennille McCoy
- Preceded by: Bill Baroni

Personal details
- Born: November 5, 1965 (age 60) Trenton, New Jersey, U.S.
- Party: Democratic
- Spouse: Toni DeAngelo
- Children: 2
- Education: Mercer County Community College
- Website: Assembly website

Wayne P. DeAngelo (born November 5, 1965) is an American Democratic Party politician, who has served in the New Jersey General Assembly since January 8, 2008, where he represents the 14th Legislative District.

== Early life ==
DeAngelo was born in Trenton, New Jersey. He is a fourth-generation Hamilton Township, Mercer County resident of Italian-American descent. He lives in the township with his wife Toni and their two daughters. DeAngelo attended Steinert High School and the Rupert John Trade School. He is the Assistant Business Manager of International Brotherhood of Electrical Workers Local 269. DeAngelo is a former Hamilton Township Councilman. DeAngelo and John Bencivengo, Hamilton's mayor, served as Grand Marshals of the 2008 Hamilton Township Columbus Day Parade.

== New Jersey Assembly ==
DeAngelo was first elected to the Assembly in 2007 winning a close race with his Democratic running mate, incumbent Assemblywoman Linda R. Greenstein against Republicans Adam Bushman and Tom Goodwin and Libertarians Jason M. Scheurer and Ray F. Cragle. While Greenstein won 27% of the total vote, DeAngelo eked out a win by getting 821 more votes than third-place winner Goodwin. He subsequently won another full term to the Assembly with Greenstein in 2009; since 2011, DeAngelo won re-election with Dan Benson.

DeAngelo and his newcomer running mate Tennille McCoy defeated Republicans Adam J. Elias and Skye Gilmartin in the 2023 New Jersey General Assembly election.

=== Committees ===
DeAngelo serves on the following committees:

- Telecommunications and Utilities, Chair
- Military and Veterans' Affairs, Vice-Chair
- Appropriations

=== District 14 ===
Each of the 40 districts in the New Jersey Legislature has one representative in the New Jersey Senate and two members in the New Jersey General Assembly. The representatives from the 14th District for the 2024—2025 Legislative Session are:

- Senator Linda R. Greenstein (D)
- Assemblyman Wayne DeAngelo (D)
- Assemblywoman Tennille McCoy (D)

== Electoral history ==
=== New Jersey Assembly ===
14th Legislative District General Election, 2023
Party	Candidate	Votes	%
Democratic	Wayne P. DeAngelo (incumbent)	32,843	30.3
Democratic	Tennille McCoy	31,181	28.8
Republican	Adam Elias	22,223	20.5
Republican	Skye Gilmartin	22,174	20.5
Total votes		108,421	100.0
Democratic hold			
Democratic hold			

14th Legislative District General Election, 2021
Party	Candidate	Votes	%
Democratic	Wayne P. DeAngelo (incumbent)	40,836	28.29%
Democratic	Daniel R. Benson (incumbent)	40,241	27.85%
Republican	Andrew Pachuta	31,366	21.71%
Republican	Bina Shah	30,531	21.13%
For The People	Michael Bollentin	1,535	1.06%
Total votes		144,509	100.0
Democratic hold			

14th Legislative District General Election, 2019
Party	Candidate	Votes	%
Democratic	Wayne DeAngelo (incumbent)	29,734	30.32%
Democratic	Daniel Benson (incumbent)	29,012	29.59%
Republican	Thomas Calabrese	19,791	20.18%
Republican	Bina Shah	18,024	18.38%
Integrity And Accountability	Michael Bollentin	1,500	1.53%
Total votes		98,061	100%
Democratic hold			

New Jersey general election, 2017
Party	Candidate	Votes	%	±%
Democratic	Wayne DeAngelo	35,596	30.0	▼0.2
Democratic	Daniel R. Benson	35,088	29.6	▲0.9
Republican	Kristian Stout	24,725	20.9	▲1.3
Republican	Steven Uccio	23,106	19.5	▲0.6
Total votes		'118,515'	'100.0'	

New Jersey general election, 2015
Party	Candidate	Votes	%	±%
Democratic	Wayne DeAngelo	22,319	30.2	▲3.2
Democratic	Daniel R. Benson	21,187	28.7	▲2.7
Republican	David C. Jones	14,474	19.6	▼4.0
Republican	Philip R. Kaufman	13,937	18.9	▼3.1
Green	Joann Cousin	1,028	1.4	N/A
Green	Steven Welzer	957	1.3	N/A
Total votes		'73,902'	'100.0'	

New Jersey general election, 2013
Party	Candidate	Votes	%	±%
Democratic	Wayne DeAngelo	32,048	27.0	▼2.0
Democratic	Daniel R. Benson	30,992	26.0	▼2.0
Republican	Steve Cook	28,135	23.6	▲2.7
Republican	Ronald Haas	26,233	22.0	▲1.2
Libertarian	Sean O’Connor	898	0.8	N/A
Libertarian	Steven Uccio	779	0.7	N/A
Total votes		'119,085'	'100.0'	

New Jersey general election, 2011
Party	Candidate	Votes	%
Democratic	Wayne DeAngelo	26,626	29.0
Democratic	Daniel R. Benson	25,662	28.0
Republican	Sheree McGowan	19,135	20.9
Republican	Wayne Wittman	19,100	20.8
Green	Steven Welzer	1,189	1.3
Total votes		91,712	100.0

New Jersey general election, 2009
Party	Candidate	Votes	%	±%
Democratic	Linda R. Greenstein	37,958	28.2	▲1.1
Democratic	Wayne DeAngelo	35,791	26.6	▲2.6
Republican	Rob Calabro	30,479	22.6	▼0.7
Republican	William T. Harvey, Jr.	29,530	21.9	▼0.8
Modern Whig	Gene L. Baldassari	859	0.6	N/A
Total votes		'134,617'	'100.0'	

New Jersey general election, 2007
Party	Candidate	Votes	%	±%
Democratic	Linda R. Greenstein	28,266	27.1	▲0.4
Democratic	Wayne P. DeAngelo	25,119	24.0	▲1.7
Republican	Thomas Goodwin	24,298	23.3	▼4.4
Republican	Adam Bushman	23,711	22.7	▲0.4
Libertarian	Jason M. Scheurer	1,775	1.7	▲1.2
Libertarian	Ray F. Cragle	1,308	1.3	▲0.8
Total votes		'104,477'	'100.0'	
