= Christopher J. Brown =

American politician

Member of the New Jersey General Assembly from the 8th Legislative District
- In office January 10, 2012 – January 12, 2016 Serving with Maria Rodriguez-Gregg
- Preceded by: Gerry Nardello
- Succeeded by: Joe Howarth

Personal details
- Born: 1971 (age 54–55)
- Party: Republican (since 2010); Democratic (before 2010)
- Education: B.A. The College of New Jersey (political science)
- Occupation: Insurance

Christopher J. Brown is an American Republican Party politician who served in the New Jersey General Assembly from January 2012 to December 2015, representing the 8th Legislative District.

== Life and career ==
Brown received a B.A. degree in political science from The College of New Jersey. He is the founder and chief executive officer of Castle Realty Management, which currently has more than 130 employees and independent contractors in several New Jersey offices, including Guardian Settlement Agents and Guardian Property and Casualty in Marlton.

Brown served as deputy mayor of Evesham Township from 2007 to 2008. In 2008, he was elected to the Burlington County Board of Chosen Freeholders as a Democrat, becoming one of the first Democrats to hold the position since 1983. In 2010, he switched parties and became a Republican. He announced he would not seek re-election for freeholder in 2011.

On August 11, 2011, after the resignation of Patrick Delany from the General Assembly seat in the 8th district, Burlington County Republicans selected former Mount Laurel Township mayor Gerry Nardello to serve the remainder of Delany's term and also selected Brown to be the Republican candidate in the 2011 general election. Brown and his running mate Scott Rudder defeated the Democratic candidates, Anita Lovely and Pamela Finnerty. He was sworn in on January 10, 2012. In the 2013 election, he won reelection alongside Republican Maria Rodriguez-Gregg. He announced his retirement from the Assembly prior to the 2015 elections, citing frustration for being in the minority party in the Legislature and his desire to spend more time with his family.

Brown is the current CEO of title & settlement company, ClosePoint USA LLC, with locations in Marlton, Somerville, Blackwood & Middletown, NJ.

== Personal life ==
Brown resides in Evesham Township. He has four sons.

New Jersey General Assembly
Preceded by Gerry Nardello	Member of the New Jersey General Assembly for the 8th District; January 10, 2012 – January 12, 2016; With: Scott Rudder, Maria Rodriguez-Gregg	Succeeded by Joe Howarth
