= Bill Baroni =

American politician and law professor

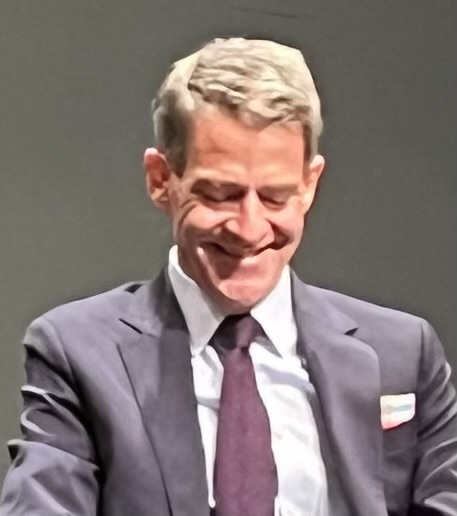
- Baroni in 2024

Deputy Executive Director of the Port Authority of New York and New Jersey
- In office March 2010 – December 12, 2013
- Preceded by: Susan Bass Levin
- Succeeded by: Deborah Gramiccioni

Member of the New Jersey Senate from the 14th district
- In office January 8, 2008 – March 1, 2010
- Preceded by: Peter Inverso
- Succeeded by: Tom Goodwin

Member of the New Jersey General Assembly from the 14th district
- In office January 13, 2004 – January 8, 2008 Serving with Linda R. Greenstein
- Preceded by: Gary Guear
- Succeeded by: Wayne DeAngelo

Personal details
- Born: December 10, 1971 (age 54) Jacksonville, Florida, U.S.
- Party: Republican
- Education: George Washington University (BA); University of Virginia (JD)

William E. Baroni Jr. (born December 10, 1971) is an American Republican Party politician and law professor. He represented the 14th legislative district in the New Jersey Senate and General Assembly. In 2010, New Jersey Governor Chris Christie named Baroni to serve as the Deputy Executive Director of the Port Authority of New York and New Jersey.

He resigned from his position at the Port Authority on December 12, 2013, during the inquiry into the Fort Lee lane closure controversy. Baroni was convicted on seven counts of conspiracy and wire fraud in relation to his involvement in the closure and sentenced to two years of imprisonment and 500 hours of community service, later reduced to 18 months. On May 7, 2020, the U.S. Supreme Court unanimously reversed the conviction in Kelly v. United States.

== Early life ==
Baroni was born in Jacksonville, Florida. He attended Steinert High School in Hamilton Township. He received a B.A. from George Washington University in history and was awarded a J.D. from the University of Virginia School of Law.

== Political career ==
=== Early career ===
Baroni became interested in politics as a teenager, working on the 1988 campaign of his hometown US representative, Christopher H. Smith (R), who was seeking re-election to his fourth term. He was also a driver for Assembly Speaker Chuck Haytaian in his campaign for US Senator against Frank Lautenberg in 1994 and worked on the advance staff for the 1996 presidential campaign of Steve Forbes.

In 1999, Baroni made his first campaign for public office, losing a race for Hamilton Township council. In 2000, Baroni was one of a small group of New Jersey Republicans who supported John McCain for president over George W. Bush.

In 2001, Baroni was general counsel for congressman Bob Franks's gubernatorial campaign. In 2002, he led the Republican efforts to keep incumbent U.S. Senator Robert Torricelli's name on the ballot after Torricelli withdrew amid ethical problems. The efforts were ultimately unsuccessful.

=== 2003 Assembly campaign ===
In 2003, Baroni mounted an aggressive campaign for the General Assembly, knocking on over 10,000 doors to defeat the Democratic incumbent Gary Guear. Baroni's campaign got a boost when Guear accused Baroni of falsely claiming to be a native Hamiltonian. Baroni was born in Jacksonville, Florida before his adoption by the Baroni family in Hamilton, where he had lived ever since. The remark backfired as an attack on Baroni's adoption, and Guear's campaign never recovered.

He was re-elected to the Assembly in 2005. During the 2005 campaign, Democratic opponent Daniel R. Benson held an October press conference at the State House, intending to attack Baroni on property taxes. Instead, Baroni personally attended the press conference and debated the issue with Benson, attacking Benson's record on taxes as a Hamilton Township councilman. Benson eventually left his own press conference, leaving Baroni to take media questions from Benson's podium.

On November 6, 2007, he won election to become State Senator of the 14th Legislative District. He captured 62.3% of the vote, defeating Democratic Party opponent Seema Singh. Baroni filled the State Senate seat vacated by Republican Senator Peter Inverso. There had been speculation that Baroni would seek the Republican nomination for United States Senate in 2008 against Frank Lautenberg, but his run for the New Jersey Senate effectively ended that speculation.

=== Legislative tenure ===
In 2004 and 2005, he was the Assembly's Assistant Parliamentarian.

Baroni served in the Senate on the Joint Committee on the Public Schools, the Health, Human Services and Senior Citizens Committee, the Wagering, Tourism & Historic Preservation Committee and the Judiciary Committee.

In 2006, Baroni helped Tom Kean Jr. prepare for his debates against Senator Bob Menendez by playing the part of Menendez. He did the same in 2009 for Chris Christie's debate preparations, standing in for Jon Corzine.

In 2008, Baroni served as State Chairman of John McCain's presidential campaign in New Jersey.

=== Political positions ===
Baroni has been described as "pro-life and pro-labor." In 2010, he was the only Republican Senator who voted to allow same-sex marriage in New Jersey. He supports same sex marriage in Ireland, of which he is also a citizen.

=== Election history ===
New Jersey State Senate elections, 2007
Party	Candidate	Votes	%
Republican	Bill Baroni	33,207	62.3
Democratic	Seema Singh	20,081	37.7
Republican hold			

New Jersey General Assembly elections, 2005
Party	Candidate	Votes	%
Republican	Bill Baroni (incumbent)	37,241	27.7
Democratic	Linda Greenstein (incumbent)	35,816	26.7
Democratic	Daniel R. Benson	29,914	22.3
Republican	Michael D. Paquette	29,899	22.3
Libertarian	William Hunsicker	725	0.5
Libertarian	Jason M. Scheurer	714	0.5

New Jersey General Assembly elections, 2003
Party	Candidate	Votes	%
Republican	Bill Baroni	27,181	27.9
Democratic	Linda Greenstein (incumbent)	24,752	25.5
Republican	Sidna B. Mitchell	23,872	24.5
Democratic	Gary Guear (incumbent)	21,448	22.1

== Legal career ==
Baroni was an associate at DeCotiis, Fitzpatrick & Cole, and then at Blank Rome. He was of counsel at Fornaro Francioso, a Hamilton firm. He served as chief counsel to Congressman Bob Franks in his 2000 U.S. Senate race. In 2002, when U.S. Senator Robert Torricelli withdrew his candidacy for re-election five weeks before Election Day after the Senate admonished him on ethics charges, Baroni argued for the Republicans in the New Jersey Supreme Court against a last-minute switch of candidates to Frank Lautenberg.

In 2002, Baroni became an adjunct professor at the Seton Hall University School of Law, where he taught classes on Professional Responsibility, voting rights, legislation, and campaign finance reform. As of January 2025, he was teaching Law & Education, and Prison Law.

== Port Authority ==
On February 19, 2010, the Governor of New Jersey, Chris Christie, announced that he was appointing Baroni to the position of Deputy Executive Director of the Port Authority of New York and New Jersey. He resigned his Senate seat to assume the new post on March 1, 2010. Tom Goodwin was selected to fill the vacant Senate seat.

As deputy executive director, Baroni worked on the redesign of the Bayonne Bridge so that large (Panamax) container ships would be able to sail underneath the bridge and access the Port Newark–Elizabeth Marine Terminal. He also secured funding and federal approvals needed to raise the deck of the bridge. Baroni served under executive director's Christopher O. Ward and Pat Foye.

=== Fort Lee lane closure scandal ===
On December 12, 2013, Christie announced that Baroni had resigned as Deputy Executive Director of the Port Authority of New York and New Jersey. That occurred after the scandal over lane closures at the George Washington Bridge, perhaps to punish Democratic Fort Lee Mayor Mark Sokolich for not supporting Christie.

On January 9, 2014, Baroni was named as a defendant in a federal class action lawsuits in the U.S. District Court for the District of New Jersey which cited a civil conspiracy and "willful, wanton, arbitrary, and egregious official misconduct." On May 1, 2015, he was indicted on nine federal counts of conspiracy, fraud, and related charges to which he pleaded not guilty.

He contested the District Attorney's decision not to release certain documents in the discovery process to mount his defense. A continuance for the trial was granted in September 2015.

==== Conviction and dismissal of charges ====
On November 4, 2016, the jury in the Bridgegate trial returned guilty verdicts on all counts against Bill Baroni and co-defendant Bridget Anne Kelly. On March 29, 2017, he was sentenced to two years in prison and 500 hours of community service.

An appeals court decision led to the dismissal of some of the charges against him. He appealed to have the remaining charges against him dismissed. On November 27, 2018, the Third Circuit Court of Appeals upheld the majority of the convictions but overturned the determination that Kelly and Baroni had violated the civil rights of travelers and found there is no established civil right to interstate travel giving rise to a criminal conviction. The court directed for Kelly and Baroni to be resentenced on the remaining seven counts of the indictment.

Baroni appealed to the US Supreme Court. On June 28, 2019, they agreed to hear the appeal in the case against Baroni and Kelly. On May 7, 2020, the Supreme Court reversed the conviction and unanimously held in Kelly v. United States that the money or property element of the federal program fraud and wire fraud laws had not been met stating:

“For no reason other than political payback, Baroni and Kelly used deception to reduce Fort Lee’s access lanes to the George Washington Bridge—and thereby jeopardized the safety of the town’s residents. But not every corrupt act by state or local officials is a federal crime. Because the scheme here did not aim to obtain money or property, Baroni and Kelly could not have violated the federal-program fraud or wire fraud laws. We therefore reverse the judgment of the Court of Appeals and remand the case for further proceedings consistent with this opinion. It is so ordered.”

== Personal life ==
=== Organizations ===
Baroni served on the Foundation Board of both The College of New Jersey and Mercer County Community College. Baroni was also chairman of the board of trustees of the Greater Trenton Symphony Orchestra and on the Board of Trustees of the New Jersey Symphony Orchestra and on the board of trustees for Visitation Home, which builds homes for New Jersey residents with disabilities. Baroni is also a special advisor to the New Jersey Boys' State Foundation, and is a former delegate at Jersey Boys' State.

He served on the Mercer County Community College Board of Trustees from 1998 to 2003. He was a member of the Hamilton Township Planning Board from 1998 to 2000.

=== Fat Kid Got Fit ===
Along with a childhood friend, Baroni co-authored Fat Kid Got Fit, and So Can You, a 2012 book chronicling Baroni's early struggles with obesity and his successful efforts to overcome the problem. Baroni wrote the book because he wants others to know that his successful weight loss came from “being healthy and working out” and that other people could share similar success.

== See also ==
- Fort Lee lane closure scandal
- List of people involved in the Fort Lee lane closure scandal
- Governorship of Chris Christie

New Jersey General Assembly
Preceded by Gary Guear	Member of the New Jersey General Assembly from the 14th district 2004–2008	Succeeded by Wayne DeAngelo
New Jersey Senate
Preceded by Peter Inverso	Member of the New Jersey Senate from the 14th district 2008–2010	Succeeded by Tom Goodwin
