= Tom Goodwin (New Jersey politician) =

American politician and businessman

Member of the New Jersey Senate from the 14th district
- In office March 15, 2010 – December 6, 2010
- Preceded by: Bill Baroni
- Succeeded by: Linda R. Greenstein

Personal details
- Born: Thomas Goodwin c. 1951 (age 74–75) Trenton, New Jersey
- Party: Republican
- Education: Mercer County Community College (AA)

Thomas Goodwin (born c. 1951) is an American politician and businessman who served as a member of the New Jersey Senate from the 14th legislative district. Selected on March 11, Goodwin succeeded Bill Baroni, who had resigned to take a role in Governor Chris Christie's administration. He was sworn in on March 15, 2010, and sought re-election in a special June primary and November general election. He was defeated in November 2010 by Assemblywoman Linda R. Greenstein.

== Early life and education ==
Goodwin was born in Trenton, New Jersey and moved to Hamilton Township when he was eight years old. He attended township public schools and graduated from Hamilton High School West. He earned an associate degree from Mercer County Community College, and received designations as Chartered Life Underwriter and Chartered Financial Consultant from The American College in Bryn Mawr, Pennsylvania.

== Career ==
=== Hamilton Township Council ===
In 2005, Goodwin was elected to the Hamilton Township Council, defeating the Democratic candidate Wayne DeAngelo. He ran against DeAngelo and fellow Democrat Linda R. Greenstein in 2007 for the State Assembly from the 14th legislative district but lost by fewer than 800 votes. He successfully defended his seat on the Hamilton Council in 2009 and was named Council President.

=== New Jersey State Senate ===
On February 19, 2010, Governor Chris Christie announced that he was appointing State Senator Bill Baroni to the position of Deputy Executive Director of the Port Authority of New York and New Jersey. Goodwin announced on March 1 that he would seek to fill the vacancy left by Baroni's resignation. At a March 11 special election convention held by the Republican committees of Mercer and Middlesex counties, Goodwin defeated former Assemblywoman Barbara Wright by a vote of 75–31. He was sworn in on March 15.

Goodwin was a successful candidate for re-election in the June Republican primary. He lost to Assemblywoman Linda R. Greenstein in the general election.

New Jersey Senate
Preceded by Bill Baroni	New Jersey State Senator - District 14; March 15, 2010 - November 22, 2010	Succeeded by Linda R. Greenstein
