= 2017 United States gubernatorial elections =

- November 7, 2017

2 governorships (Note: Alaska's governorship was held by an independent, so the number of seats held by Democrats and Republicans added up to only 49.)
	Majority party	Minority party
Party	Republican	Democratic
Seats before	34 (Note: Governor Jim Justice of West Virginia changed party affiliation from Democratic to Republican in August 2017.)	15
Seats after	33	16
Seat change	▼1	▲1
Popular vote	2,075,314	2,612,285
Percentage	43.58%	54.86%
Seats up	1	1
Seats won	0	2
- Map of the results Democratic gain Democratic hold No election

United States gubernatorial elections were held on November 7, 2017, in two states: Virginia and New Jersey. These elections formed part of the 2017 United States elections. The last regular gubernatorial elections for these two states were in 2013. Both incumbents were term-limited, so both seats were open. Democrats held the governorship in Virginia and picked up the governorship of New Jersey.

For the first time since 2008, Democrats won the total popular vote of the year's gubernatorial elections.

== Election predictions ==
Several sites and individuals publish predictions of competitive seats. These predictions look at factors such as the strength of the incumbent (if the incumbent is running for re-election), the strength of the candidates, and the partisan leanings of the state (reflected in part by the state's Cook Partisan Voting Index rating). The predictions assign ratings to each state, with the rating indicating the predicted advantage that a party has in winning that seat.

Most election predictors use:

- "tossup": no advantage
- "tilt" (used by some predictors): advantage that is not quite as strong as "lean"
- "lean": slight advantage
- "likely": significant, but surmountable, advantage
- "safe" or "solid": near-certain chance of victory

State	PVI	Incumbent	Last race	Cook Aug 7, 2017	IE Oct 27, 2017	Sabato Sep 21, 2017	Result
New Jersey	D+7	Chris Christie (term-limited)	60.30% R	Likely D (flip)	Likely D (flip)	Safe D (flip)	Murphy; 56.03% D (flip)
Virginia	D+1	Terry McAuliffe (term-limited)	47.75% D	Lean D	Tilt D	Lean D	Northam; 53.90% D

== Race summary ==
=== Results ===
State	Incumbent	Party	First elected	Result	Candidates
New Jersey	Chris Christie	Republican	2009	Incumbent term-limited. New governor elected. Democratic gain.	▌ ✓ Phil Murphy (Democratic) 56.0%; ▌Kim Guadagno (Republican) 41.9%
Virginia	Terry McAuliffe	Democratic	2013	Incumbent term-limited. New governor elected. Democratic hold.	▌ ✓ Ralph Northam (Democratic) 53.9%; ▌Ed Gillespie (Republican) 45.0%; ▌Cliff Hyra (Libertarian) 1.1%

== Closest races ==
States where the margin of victory was less than 10%:

1. Virginia, 8.90%

Blue denotes states won by Democrats.

== New Jersey ==
2017 New Jersey gubernatorial election
- November 7, 2017
- Turnout: 38.5% (▼1.1%)
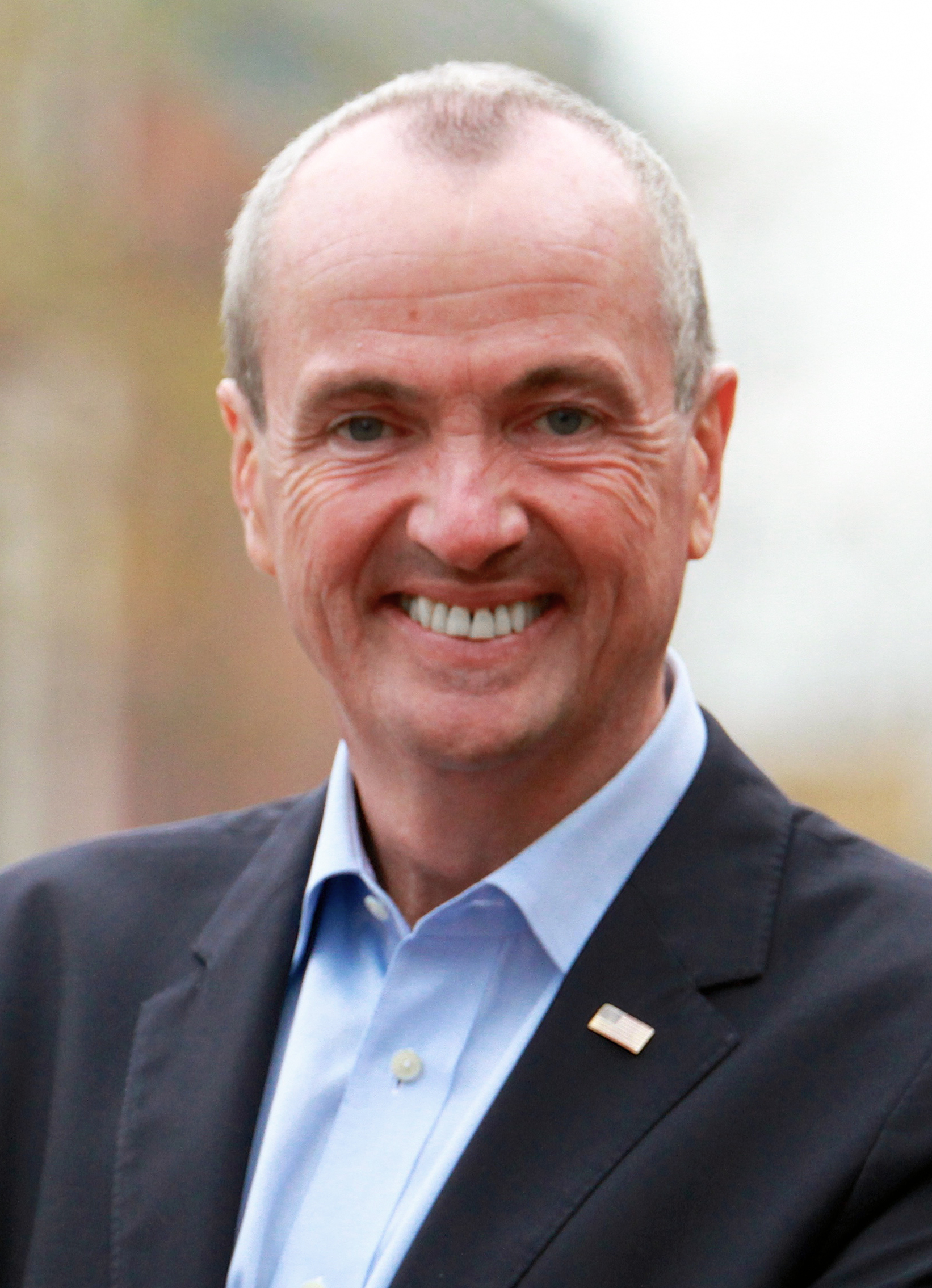

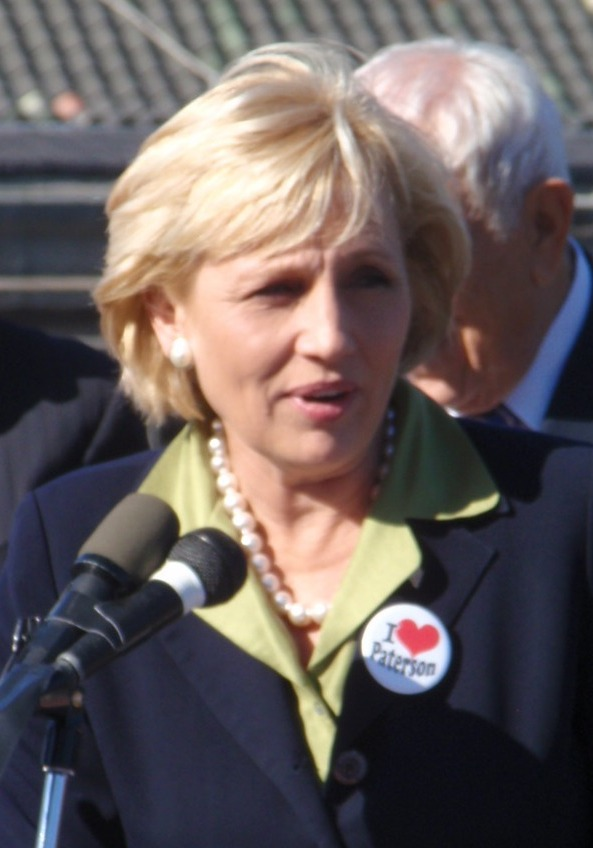
Nominee	Phil Murphy	Kim Guadagno
Party	Democratic	Republican
Running mate	Sheila Oliver	Carlos Rendo
Popular vote	1,203,110	899,583
Percentage	56.0%	41.9%
- County results Murphy: 40–50% 50–60% 60–70% 70–80% 80–90% Guadagno: 50–60% 60–70%
Governor before election
Chris Christie
Republican
Elected Governor
Phil Murphy
Democratic

The 2017 New Jersey gubernatorial election was held on November 7, 2017. There were seven candidates. Candidates for Lieutenant Governor of New Jersey run on the same ticket and thus are elected at the same time. Incumbent Republican governor Chris Christie was term-limited and could not run for a third consecutive term.

Primary elections took place on June 6, 2017. Kim Guadagno, Lieutenant Governor of New Jersey, won the Republican primary. Woodcliff Lake Mayor Carlos Rendo was her running mate. Phil Murphy, banker and former U.S. Ambassador to Germany, won the Democratic primary. Former State Assembly Speaker Sheila Oliver was his running mate. Seth Kaper-Dale ran as the Green Party candidate; his running mate was Lisa Durden. Pete Rohrman ran as the Libertarian Party candidate; his running mate was Karrese Laguerre. Matt Riccardi ran as the Constitution Party candidate. There were two other independent candidates on the ballot.

Murphy was declared to be the winner when polls closed at 8 pm EST based on exit polling alone. He ultimately received 56.0% of the vote, winning with a 14.1% vote lead over his opponent. This was similar to the results in the 2016 election with Murphy slightly outperforming Hillary Clinton by one percentage point. However, with just 38.5% of registered voters casting ballots, this would be the lowest turnout on record for a gubernatorial election in New Jersey. This was the first gubernatorial election in New Jersey since 1989, in which the Democratic candidate won Somerset County.

Results

New Jersey gubernatorial election, 2017
Party	Candidate	Votes	%	±%
Democratic	Phil Murphy	1,203,110	56.03%	+17.84%
Republican	Kim Guadagno	899,583	41.89%	−18.41%
Independent	Gina Genovese	12,294	0.57%	N/A
Libertarian	Peter J. Rohrman	10,531	0.49%	−0.08%
Green	Seth Kaper-Dale	10,053	0.47%	+0.08%
Constitution	Matthew Riccardi	6,864	0.32%	N/A
Independent	Vincent Ross	4,980	0.29%	N/A
Total votes		2,147,415	100.0%	N/A
Democratic gain from Republican				

== Virginia ==
2017 Virginia gubernatorial election
- November 7, 2017
- Turnout: 47.6% (of registered voters)
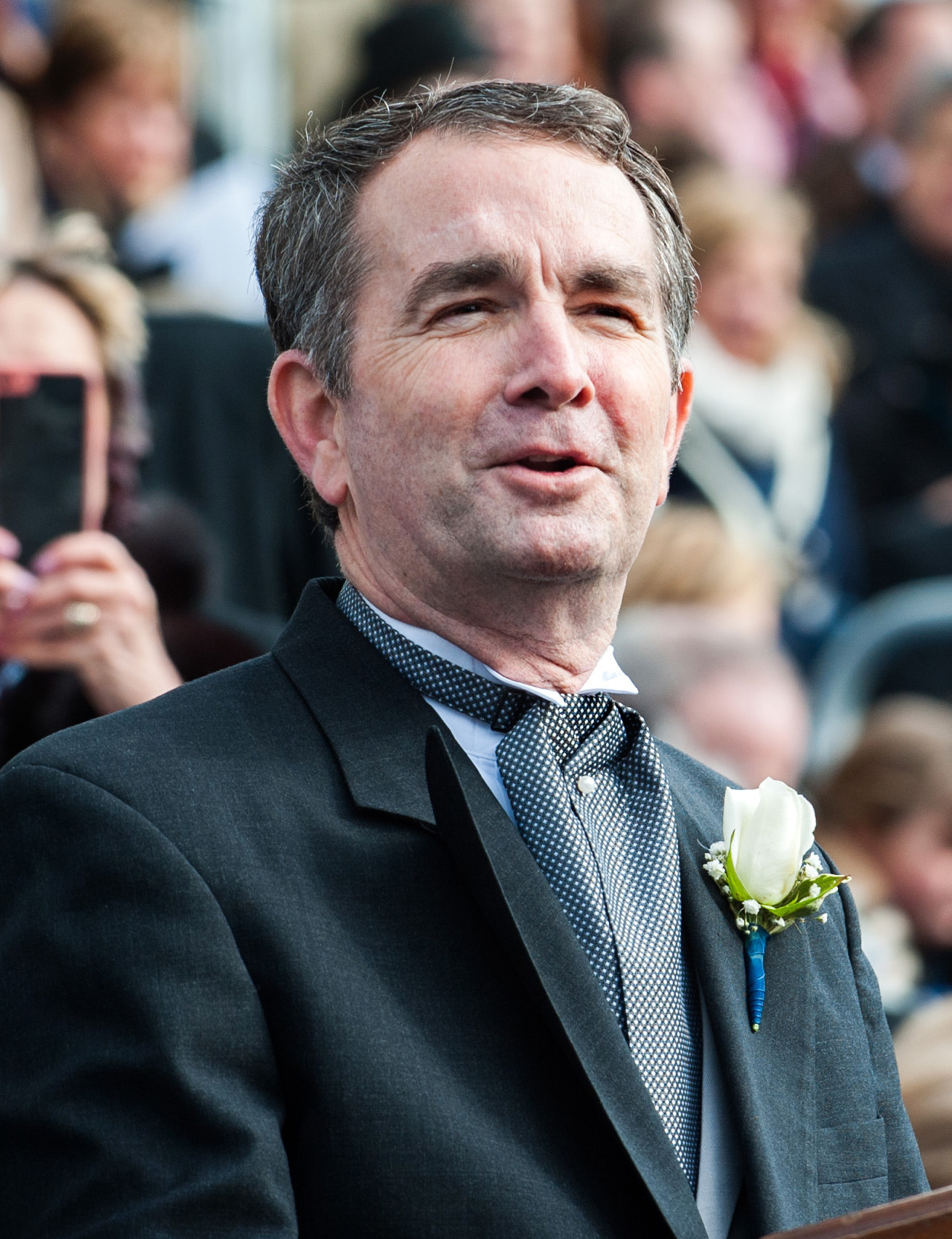

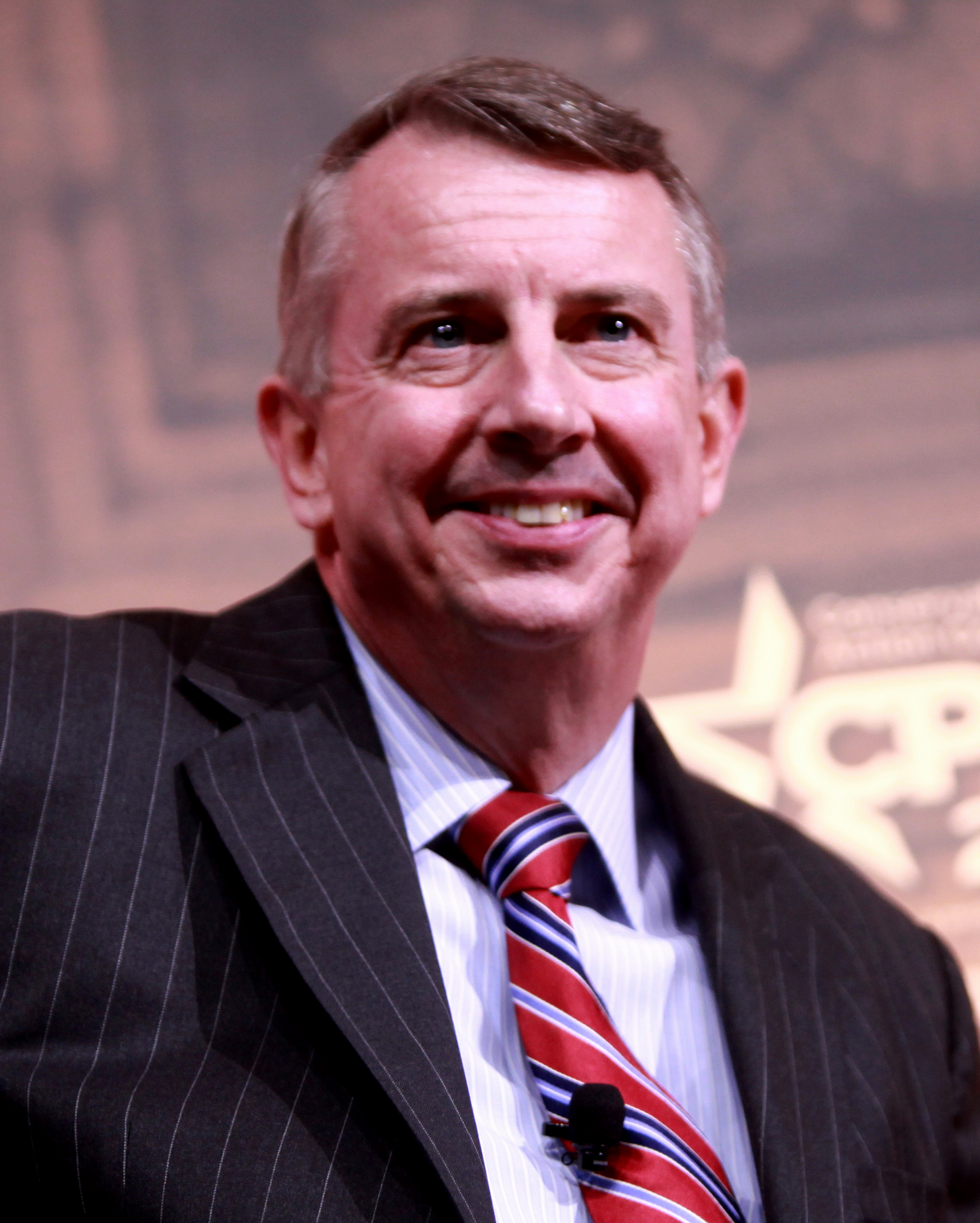
Nominee	Ralph Northam	Ed Gillespie
Party	Democratic	Republican
Popular vote	1,409,175	1,175,731
Percentage	53.9%	45.0%
- County and Independent City Results; Northam: 40–50% 50-60% 60-70% 70-80% 80-90% Gillespie: 40–50% 50-60% 60-70% 70-80% 80-90%
Governor before election
Terry McAuliffe
Democratic
Elected Governor
Ralph Northam
Democratic

Democratic Governor Terry McAuliffe won election with 48% of the vote in 2013. McAuliffe was not eligible to run for reelection due to term limits established by the Virginia Constitution.

The Virginia gubernatorial election of 2017 was held on November 7, 2017. Primary elections took place on June 13, 2017. Virginia utilizes an open primary, in which registered voters are allowed to vote in either party's primary election. The Democratic Party nominated Ralph Northam and the Republican Party nominated Ed Gillespie. The Libertarian Party nominated Clifford Hyra by convention on May 6, 2017.

In the general election on November 7, 2017, Democratic nominee Ralph Northam defeated Republican nominee Ed Gillespie, winning by the largest margin for a Democrat since 1985. Northam became the 73rd governor of Virginia, and assumed office on January 13, 2018. The election had the highest voter turnout percentage in a Virginia gubernatorial election in twenty years with over 47% of the state's constituency casting their ballot.

Results

Virginia gubernatorial election, 2017
Party	Candidate	Votes	%	±%
Democratic	Ralph Northam	1,409,175	53.90%	+6.15%
Republican	Ed Gillespie	1,175,731	44.97%	−0.26%
Libertarian	Clifford Hyra	27,987	1.07%	−5.45%
n/a	Write-ins	1,389	0.05%	−0.44%
Total votes		2,614,282	100.0%	N/A
Democratic hold				

== See also ==
- 2017 United States elections
  - 2017 New Jersey elections
  - 2017 Virginia elections
