= 2017 United States elections =

- ← 2015 2016 2017 2018 2019 → Off-year elections
- Election day: November 7

Senate elections
- Seats contested: 1 mid-term vacancy
- Net seat change: Democratic +1
- Map of the 2017 Senate special elections Democratic gain (1)

House elections
- Seats contested: 6 mid-term vacancies
- Net seat change: 0
- Map of the 2017 House special elections Democratic hold (1) Republican hold (5)

Gubernatorial elections
- Seats contested: 2
- Net seat change: Democratic +1
- Map of the 2017 gubernatorial races Democratic hold (1); Democratic gain (1)

Elections were held in the United States on November 7, 2017. This off-year election featured gubernatorial elections in Virginia and New Jersey, as well as state legislative elections in both houses of the New Jersey Legislature and in the Virginia House of Delegates (the lower house of the Virginia legislature). Numerous citizen initiatives, mayoral races, and a variety of other local elections also occurred. Special elections were also held for one seat of the U.S. Senate, representing Alabama, and six seats of the U.S. House of Representatives. The Democrats picked up the governorship in New Jersey and the Alabama Senate seat that was up for a special election. The governorship in Virginia and the six House seats that were up for special elections did not change party hands.

Analysts such as Harry Enten of FiveThirtyEight and Chris Cillizza of CNN interpreted the 2017 election results overall as demonstrating a move toward the Democratic Party. With the Democrats picking up the Senate seat in Alabama, it reduced the Republicans' majority in the Senate to 51–49. The analysts also noted that although none of five House seats held by a Republican switched to the other party in the 2017 special elections, in each race the Democrat received a higher percentage of votes than in recent elections for the same seat. Furthermore, Democrats made large gains in the Virginia House of Delegates, and picked up 42 seats in state legislatures.

== Federal elections ==
The following special elections were held to replace Senators or Representatives who resigned in the 115th U.S. Congress:

=== Senate ===
- Alabama Class 2: incumbent Senator Jeff Sessions was confirmed by the Senate to serve as United States Attorney General on February 8, 2017, and subsequently resigned from the Senate. Governor Robert J. Bentley chose Luther Strange, the Attorney General of Alabama, to succeed Sessions, filling the seat until the special election takes place. Although he had the power to schedule an election in 2017, Bentley decided to align it with the 2018 general election. Following Bentley's resignation in April 2017, Governor Kay Ivey decided to reschedule the elections. The primary election took place on August 15 with Doug Jones winning the Democratic nomination. Roy Moore was nominated as the Republican candidate on September 26. Jones won the election on December 12, 2017.

=== House of Representatives ===
- California's 34th congressional district: Democrat Xavier Becerra resigned to become Attorney General of California. The primary election was held on April 4, 2017. With no candidate receiving 50% of the vote, a runoff between the top two candidates, Democrats Jimmy Gomez and Robert Lee Ahn, was held June 6. Gomez defeated Ahn 60.1% to 39.9% to become the new representative.
- Georgia's 6th congressional district: Tom Price resigned February 10, 2017, to become the United States Secretary of Health and Human Services. A special election was held on April 18, 2017. A runoff was held on June 20, 2017, and was won by Republican Karen Handel, although Democrat Jon Ossoff gained 47% of the historically Republican district.
- Kansas's 4th congressional district: Republican Mike Pompeo resigned January 23, 2017, to become Director of the Central Intelligence Agency. A special election was held on April 11, 2017, and won by Ron Estes, the Republican Kansas State Treasurer at the time.
- Montana's at-large congressional district: Ryan Zinke resigned on March 1, 2017, to become the United States Secretary of the Interior. Republican Greg Gianforte, a businessman and nominee for the previous year's gubernatorial race, defeated Democrat Rob Quist and Libertarian Mark Wicks 49.7% to 44.1% and 5.7%.
- South Carolina's 5th congressional district: Mick Mulvaney resigned on February 16, 2017, to become the Director of the Office of Management and Budget. A special election was held on June 20, 2017, and was won by Republican Ralph Norman, defeating Democratic nominee, Archie Parnell.
- Utah's 3rd congressional district: Jason Chaffetz resigned on June 30, 2017, for health reasons. Governor Gary Herbert scheduled a special election, the primary was held on August 15 and the general election was held on November 7. Republican John Curtis was elected.

== State and territorial elections ==
=== Gubernatorial ===
Two states held gubernatorial elections in 2017:

- New Jersey: two-term Republican Chris Christie was term-limited in 2017. Christie campaigned for the 2016 Republican presidential nomination, but withdrew from the race February 10, 2016. Lieutenant Governor Kim Guadagno, a Republican, faced off against Democrat and former U.S. ambassador to Germany Phil Murphy. Murphy was elected on November 7.
- Virginia: one-term Democrat Terry McAuliffe was term-limited in 2017. The election was won by Democratic lieutenant governor Ralph Northam.

=== Legislative ===
The two states that held gubernatorial elections also held legislative elections:

- New Jersey: New Jersey General Assembly and New Jersey Senate; Democrats added modestly to their majorities in both houses.
- Virginia: Virginia House of Delegates; Democrats made large gains, reducing the Republicans' majority to 1 seat.

Democrats also won control of the Washington Senate through a November special election. As part of a federal court ruling that invalidated its state legislative districts, the North Carolina General Assembly was ordered to hold special elections in the fall of 2017 with updated district lines. However, the US Supreme Court has put a hold on the 2017 election until it rules on the matter.

=== Attorney general ===
One state held an attorney general election in 2017:

- Virginia: One-term Democratic attorney general Mark Herring successfully ran for re-election.

=== Judicial ===
Two states held supreme court elections in 2017:

- Pennsylvania held elections for three seats—one competitive election and two retention elections. In the Pennsylvania system, a justice must first be elected in a competitive race, and at the end of their term, there is an up-or-down election on whether that justice should be retained.
  - In the competitive partisan election, Republican Sallie Updyke Mundy defeated Democrat Dwayne Woodruff.
  - Republican chief justice Thomas G. Saylor was retained for another ten-year term.
  - Democratic justice Debra Todd was retained for another ten-year term.
- Wisconsin re-elected Republican-backed justice Annette Ziegler without opposition to a second ten-year term.

=== Ballot measures ===
==== Puerto Rican status referendum ====
A referendum regarding the political status of Puerto Rico was held on June 11. Puerto Rican voters were asked whether they prefer statehood, independence/free association, or maintain the current U.S. territorial status. This was the fifth such plebiscite overall, and the first one since 2012. Because there were almost 500,000 blank ballots in that 2012 referendum, creating confusion as to the voters' true desire, Congress decided to ignore that vote and then subsequently allocated funds for holding this 2017 one. 97% of the voters chose statehood in the referendum, though turnout was only at 23%.

==== Constitutional Convention of New York ====
Under the provisions of the New York Constitution, every twenty years the state is required to place before the voters a proposal to hold a constitutional convention to be held the following year, with any suggested amendments being voted on in the year after that. Therefore, in November 2017 a proposal was placed on the ballot for a 2018 convention, with any amendments to be voted on in 2019. On this vote, over 80% voted against a constitutional convention.

== Mayoral elections ==
Various elections were held for officeholders in numerous cities, counties, school boards, special districts and others around the country. Below is a list of the mayoral elections held in the main cities of the United States:

- Albany, New York: incumbent Democrat Kathy Sheehan was re-elected to a second term.
- Albuquerque, New Mexico, Democratic state auditor Tim Keller won the open seat. Prior to his victory, Republicans held the city's top leadership position for eight years.
- Allentown, Pennsylvania: incumbent Democrat Ed Pawlowski was re-elected to a fourth term.
- Atlanta, Georgia: This is a nonpartisan office. Incumbent Kasim Reed was term-limited and could not run for reelection to a third term in office. Keisha Lance Bottoms was elected to replace Reed.
- Atlantic City, New Jersey: incumbent Republican Mayor Don Guardian was defeated for reelection by Democratic City Councilman Frank Gilliam.
- Birmingham, Alabama: incumbent Democrat William A. Bell was defeated for re-election by fellow Democrat Randall Woodfin.
- Boston, Massachusetts: This is a nonpartisan office. Incumbent Marty Walsh won reelection to a second term in office.
- Buffalo, New York: incumbent Democrat Byron Brown won re-election for a fourth term in office.
- Charlotte, North Carolina: Democratic councilwoman Vi Lyles defeated Republican councilman Kenny Smith to become the city's first African-American female mayor.
- Cincinnati, Ohio: incumbent Democrat John Cranley won reelection to a second term in office.
- Cleveland, Ohio: incumbent Democrat Frank G. Jackson won reelection to a fourth term in office, making him the longest-serving mayor in the city's history.
- Detroit, Michigan: This is a nonpartisan office. Incumbent Mike Duggan won reelection to a second term in office.
- Flint, Michigan: This is a nonpartisan office. The recall election was unsuccessful and incumbent Karen Weaver was re-elected to the remainder of her first term.
- Greensboro, North Carolina: incumbent Nancy Vaughan was re-elected to a third term.
- Harrisburg, Pennsylvania: incumbent Democrat Eric Papenfuse was re-elected to a second term.
- Hoboken, New Jersey: This is a nonpartisan office. Incumbent Democrat Dawn Zimmer decided not to run for reelection. City Councilman Ravi Bhalla was elected to replace Zimmer, making him the first Sikh mayor in New Jersey history.
- Jackson, Mississippi: incumbent Democrat Tony Yarber ran for reelection but was defeated by fellow Democrat Chokwe Antar Lumumba, son of the late Mayor Chokwe Lumumba.
- Jersey City, New Jersey: incumbent Democrat Steven Fulop was reelected to a second term in office.
- Lancaster, Pennsylvania: incumbent Democrat Rick Gray did not seek re-election and was succeeded by fellow Democrat Danane Sorace.
- Lansing, Michigan: incumbent Democrat Virg Bernero did not seek re-election and was succeeded by fellow Democrat Andy Schor.
- Los Angeles: incumbent Democrat Eric Garcetti won reelection to a second term in office.
- Manchester, New Hampshire: This is a nonpartisan office. Incumbent Ted Gatsas unsuccessfully sought re-election and was succeeded by Joyce Craig, the city's first female mayor.
- Miami, Florida: incumbent Republican Tomás Regalado was term-limited and could not run for a third term in office. Republican City Commissioner Francis Suarez was elected to replace Regalado.
- Minneapolis, Minnesota: incumbent Democrat Betsy Hodges finished third and was eliminated after four rounds of vote tabulations. Fellow Democratic City Council member Jacob Frey was elected mayor, after finishing 1st place in all five rounds of vote tabulations.
- New Orleans: incumbent Democrat Mitch Landrieu is term limited and cannot run for a third term in office. Democrat LaToya Cantrell was elected to succeed Landrieu, making her the city's first female mayor.
- New York City: incumbent Democrat Bill de Blasio won reelection to a second term in office.
- Omaha, Nebraska: incumbent Republican Jean Stothert won reelection to a second term in office.
- Pittsburgh, Pennsylvania: incumbent Democrat Bill Peduto won reelection to a second term in office, with no opposition.
- Rochester, New York: incumbent Democrat Lovely Warren won reelection to a second term.
- Seattle, Washington: incumbent Democrat Ed Murray was not running for re-election before his resignation in September 2017, and subsequent replacement by interim Mayor Bruce Harrell who was replaced by current Mayor Tim Burgess. Democratic former U.S. Attorney for the Western District of Washington Jenny Durkan was elected to succeed Burgess.
- St. Louis, Missouri: incumbent Democrat Francis Slay decided not to run for re-election. Democrat Lyda Krewson was elected to succeed Slay.
- Saint Paul, Minnesota: incumbent Democrat Chris Coleman decided not to run for re-election in order to explore a gubernatorial run. Former Democratic City CouncilmanMelvin Carter III was elected to replace Coleman.
- St. Petersburg, Florida: This is a nonpartisan office. Incumbent Rick Kriseman was re-elected to a second term in office.
- San Antonio, Texas: This is a nonpartisan office. Incumbent Ivy Taylor was defeated for re-election by Ron Nirenberg.
- Syracuse, New York: Ben Walsh (Independence, Reform) defeated Juanita Perez Williams (Democratic), Howie Hawkins (Green), Laura Levine (Republican), and Joseph A. Nicoletti (Working Families).

== Milestones ==
Fifteen candidates who were members of the Democratic Socialists of America were elected to office in thirteen states, most notably Lee J. Carter in the Virginia House of Delegates, thus adding to the twenty members already holding elected office nationwide.

== Tables of partisan control results ==
These tables show the partisan results of the Congressional special elections and gubernatorial races in 2017. Bold indicates a change in control.

Senate seats
	Before 2017 elections		After 2017 elections	
Seat	Incumbent	State delegation	Winner	State delegation
Alabama Class 2	Rep	Rep 2–0	**Dem**	**Split 1–1**
United States	Rep 52–48 (Note: Maine Senator Angus King and Vermont Senator Bernie Sanders, the two Independents who caucus with the Democrats, are counted as Democrats.)		Rep 51–49	

House Congressional seats
	Before 2017 elections		After 2017 elections	
Seat	Incumbent	State delegation	Winner	State delegation
California 34th	Dem	Dem 39–14	Dem	Dem 39–14
Georgia 6th	Rep	Rep 10–4	Rep	Rep 10–4
Kansas 4th	Rep	Rep 4–0	Rep	Rep 4–0
Montana at-large	Rep	Rep 1–0	Rep	Rep 1–0
South Carolina 5th	Rep	Rep 6–1	Rep	Rep 6–1
Utah 3rd	Rep	Rep 4–0	Rep	Rep 4–0
United States	Rep 241–194		Rep 241–194 (Note: Vacant seats that have pending special elections in 2018 are counted as still being held by their respective incumbent party.)	

Governorships
State	Incumbent	Winner
New Jersey	Rep	**Dem**
Virginia	Dem	Dem
United States	Rep 34–15–1 (Note: Reflects the August 2017 announcement by West Virginia Governor Jim Justice that he changed his party affiliation from Democratic to Republican.)	Rep 33–16–1

State legislatures
State	Incumbent	Winner
New Jersey	Dem	Dem
Virginia (Note: Includes both chambers of the Virginia General Assembly. The then-Republican-controlled Senate of Virginia was not up for election in 2017.)	Rep	Rep
