= Reformed Church of Highland Park =

- Reformed Church of Highland Park
- Location within Middlesex County, New Jersey
- 40.4995717°N 74.4322106°W
- Address: 19 South 2nd Avenue, Highland Park, New Jersey 08904
- Country: United States
- Denomination: Reformed Church in America
- Website: http://www.rchighlandpark.org/

Architecture
- Architect: Alexander Merchant
- Completed: 1897

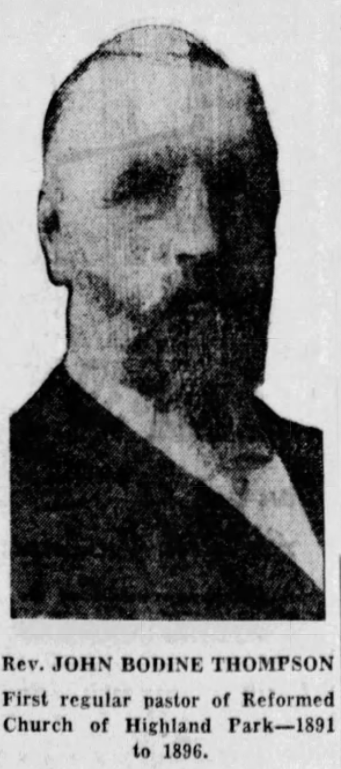

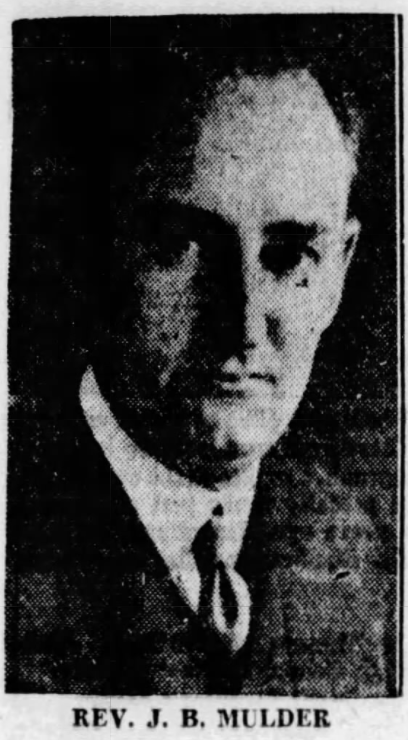

The Reformed Church of Highland Park is a Reformed Church in America church and congregation in Highland Park, New Jersey.

== Congregation ==
The congregation formed in 1890. Construction of the church began in 1897 and the building was dedicated on October 1, 1898. It had been eight years since the congregation was formed. They celebrated their 100th anniversary in 1990.

== Building ==
The building was designed by Alexander Merchant (1872–1952), the architect responsible for numerous notable buildings in Highland Park, particularly in the Livingston Manor Historic District. It was his first design for Highland Park. The auditorium wing is circa 1920.

The buildings have been equipped with solar panels.

== Housing ==
The RCHP Affordable Housing Corporation has built and maintains homes for the disenfranchised or homeless groups, among them veterans, chronically homeless adults, refugees, asylum seekers, youth leaving foster care, formerly-incarcerated students including projects in Highland Park, New Brunswick, and Newark.

== Immigrant sanctuary ==
The church has provided sanctuary for undocumented immigrants since at least 2012. Notably, it gained national attention when church became a sanctuary for Indonesian immigrants facing deportation. Again in 2018, the church received attention when some of its parishioners, who had been targeted by U.S. Immigration and Customs Enforcement (ICE), took refuge in the church. They were visited by Phil Murphy, the New Jersey Governor and Gurbir Grewal, the New Jersey Attorney General who vowed to take up the matter. Grewal later asked the United States Department of Homeland Security to clarify its policy with regard to policing 'sensitive areas' such as churches and schools. Two parishioners who had been arrested were prevented from being deported by a restraining order.

After four Christian Indonesian residents of the town had been deported in February 2017, the municipal council began considering an "immigrant inclusive" resolution, which was adopted in June 2017. It stated law enforcement would be based on New Jersey Department of Law and Public Safety guidelines and would not assist or interfere with federal immigration actions.

== Pastors ==
Pastor	Term	Notes
Seth Kaper-Dale	2001 to present	He is a co-pastor with Stephanie Kaper-Dale, his wife, both installed on September 30, 2001. He was the Green Party candidate in the New Jersey gubernatorial election, 2017. He won 9,849, or 0.47%, of votes cast.
Stephanie Kaper-Dale	2001 to present	She is a co-pastor with her husband, Seth Kaper-Dale. They were installed on September 30, 2001.
Dennis J. Van Wyk	1999 to 2001	He served as the interim pastor until a new pastor could be found. He was born in 1947. He attended the New Brunswick Theological Seminary. He served as pastor to the congregations of the Brick Reformed Church in Montgomery, New York; the Old Brick Reformed Church in Marlboro, New Jersey; he was the interim senior pastor at the First Presbyterian Church of Manasquan. He died in 2002.
Richard Blake	1990 (circa) to 1999	
C. David Buchanan	1980 to 1990 (circa)	He attended Drew University.
Irving H. Decker	1956 to 1980	He was born on December 5, 1910, in Gardiner, New York. He was president of the Classis of Westchester, New York, and the Classis of New Brunswick. He died on November 30, 1981, in Point Pleasant Hospital in Point Pleasant, New Jersey.
James Bernard Mulder	1930 to 1956	He was born on February 1, 1888, in Zeeland, Michigan. He previously served the Second Reformed Church of Irvington in Irvington, New Jersey. He was installed on October 2, 1930, as pastor of the Reformed Church of Highland Park. He was pastor for the 50th anniversary celebration in 1940. He died in August 1973 in Highland Park, New Jersey.
Theodore Brinckerhoff	1930	He was appointed by the Classis of New Brunswick to supervise the congregation until a new pastor was chosen and installed.
Anthony Luidens	1919 to 1930	He was installed on April 9, 1919. He resigned on January 9, 1930, to become the pastor at the Brighton Reformed Church in Rochester, New York.
Frederick F. Shield	1911 to 1918	He was previously the pastor of the Reformed Church of Long Branch. He was installed as pastor of the Reformed Church of Highland Park on May 1, 1911. During his tenure 310 people joined the congregation, 130 of them in the previous 2 years. He resigned on September 1, 1918.
Thomas C. Easton	1909 to 1911	He was previously the pastor of the First Reformed Church of New Brunswick. He was installed on May 9, 1909, at age 72. He resigned on January 1, 1911.
Edward J. Meeker	1903 to 1908	He had been the pastor in Mohawk, New York. He was installed on December 6, 1903, at the Reformed Church of Highland Park. He resigned on August 1, 1908, after serving for 5 years.
Alexander Scott Van Dyke	1897 to 1903	He was born in Manhattan, New York City, on November 25, 1858, to Peter Van Dyck and Elizabeth Beirer. He was a missionary in Amoy, China for 13 years. He was installed as pastor of the Reformed Church of Highland Park on November 27, 1896, and served for 6 years. He resigned on October 1, 1903, to become the pastor of the Cobleskill Reformed Church. After the death of his first wife he married Bertha Marie Tamm on June 5, 1912, in Bronx, New York City. He died in 1951 in Hudson, New York, and was buried in Mount Pleasant Reformed Church Cemetery.
John Bodine Thompson	1891 to 1896	John Bodine Thompson was the first installed pastor of the Reformed Church of Highland Park. He was installed on October 20, 1891. He performed the first marriage of the congregation, between Deacon Alexander Merchant (1872-1952) and Margaret Beaton Anderson. He served until September 1896. By the end of his tenure the congregation had grown from 20 families to 50 families. He died on September 5, 1907.
Orville J. Hogan	1890	He was a student at the New Brunswick Theological Seminary due to graduate in 1893. He agreed to supervise the congregation for six months beyond the term of Corin. He donated his pay toward paying off the congregation's debts.
Edward T. Corin	1890	On June 16, 1890, he was invited to be pastor. He was a professor that the New Brunswick Theological Seminary. He did not wish to be bound to the church as pastor, but agreed to supervise the congregation for six months.

== See also ==
- Sanctuary movement
- Sanctuary city
