= 2017 New Jersey gubernatorial election =

- November 7, 2017
- Turnout: 38.5% (▼1.1%)
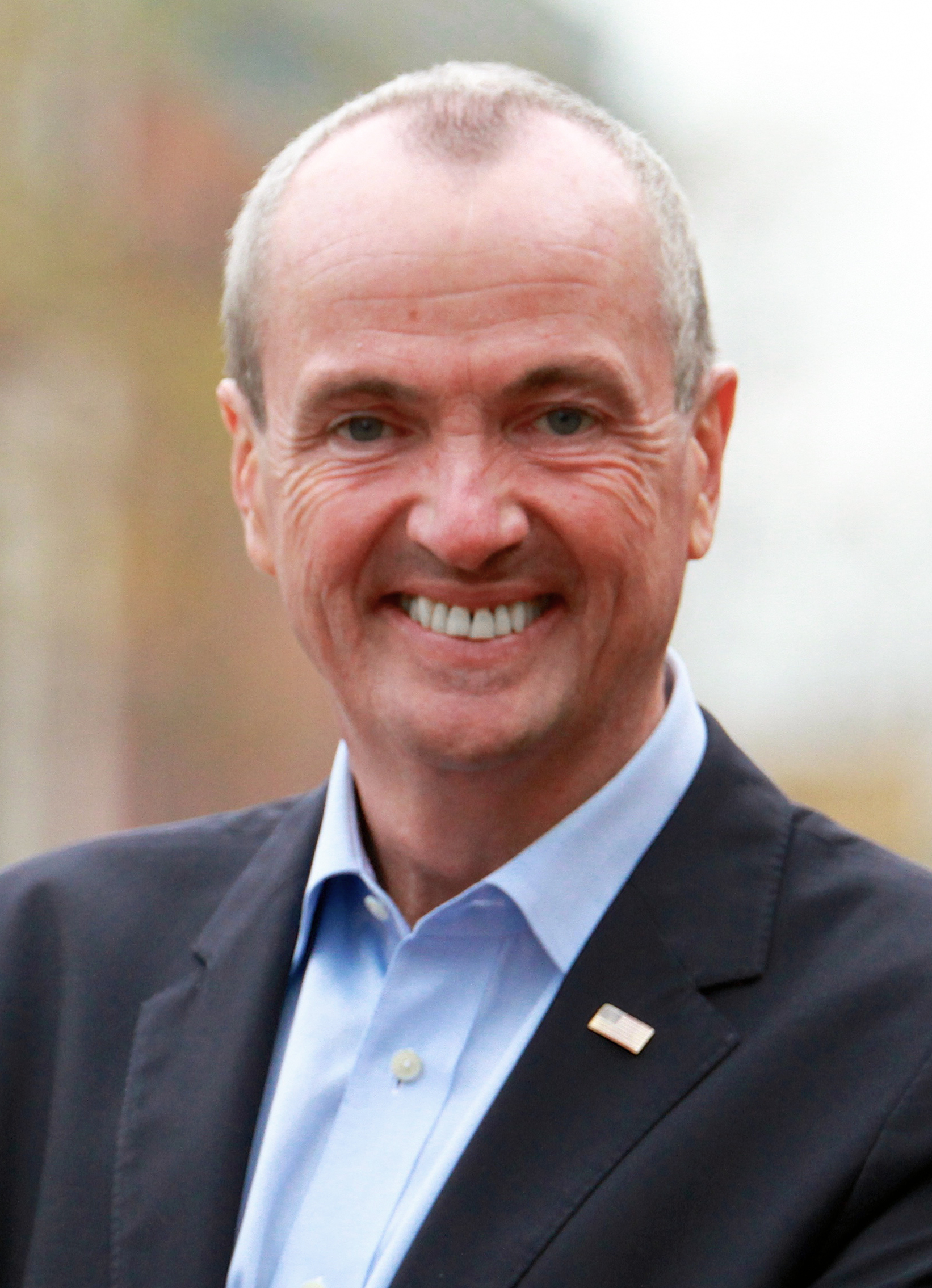

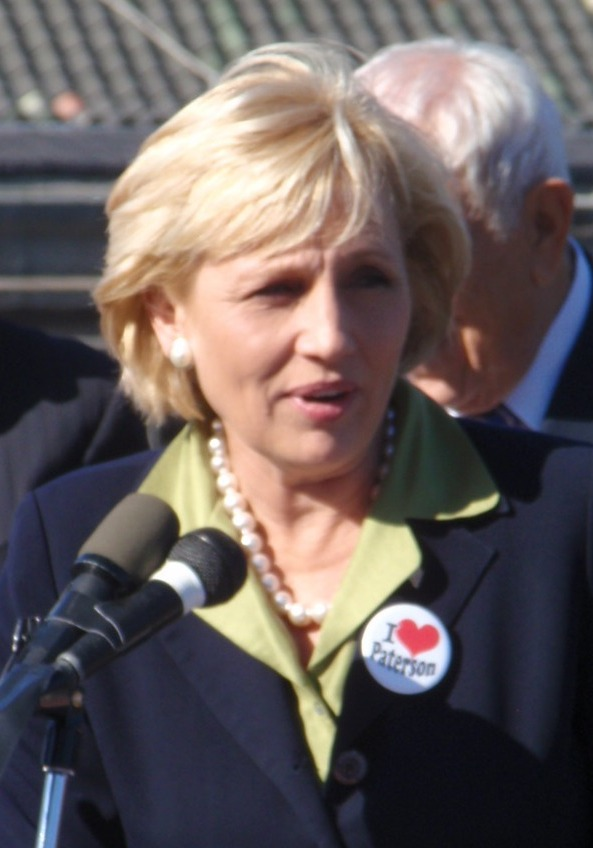
| Nominee | Phil Murphy | Kim Guadagno |
| Party | Democratic | Republican |
| Running mate | Sheila Oliver | Carlos Rendo |
| Popular vote | 1,203,110 | 899,583 |
| Percentage | 56.03% | 41.89% |
- Murphy: 40–50% 50–60% 60–70% 70–80% 80–90% >90% Guadagno: 40–50% 50–60% 60–70% 70–80% >90% Tie: 40–50% 50% No votes
Governor before election
Chris Christie
Republican
Elected Governor
Phil Murphy
Democratic

The 2017 New Jersey gubernatorial election was held on November 7, 2017, to elect the governor of New Jersey. Incumbent Republican Governor Chris Christie was term-limited and ineligible to seek re-election to a third consecutive term. Former U.S. Ambassador to Germany, Phil Murphy and former Speaker of the Assembly Sheila Oliver won the gubernatorial election in a landslide, defeating incumbent Lieutenant Governor Kim Guadagno and the incumbent Mayor of Woodcliff Lake Carlos Rendo by a wide margin of 14.14%. This election was one of the first major races that took place during Donald Trump's first presidency.

Primary elections took place on June 6, 2017. Kim Guadagno, the incumbent lieutenant governor of New Jersey, won the Republican primary for governor and chose Woodcliff Lake Mayor Carlos Rendo as her running mate. Phil Murphy, a banker and former U.S. ambassador to Germany, won the Democratic primary, and chose former State Assembly Speaker Sheila Oliver as his running mate. Seth Kaper-Dale ran as the Green Party candidate with Lisa Durden, while Pete Rohrman ran as the Libertarian Party candidate with Karrese Laguerre. Matt Riccardi ran as the Constitution Party candidate. There were two other independent candidates on the ballot.

Murphy led throughout the general election, with many analysts expecting a Democratic pickup. When polls closed on Election Day, Murphy was immediately declared the winner, based on exit polling alone. Murphy received 56.0% of the vote to Guadagno's 41.9%. Murphy slightly outperformed Hillary Clinton's 2016 presidential run in the state, and won one county (Gloucester) that Clinton lost in 2016, while Guadagno did not win any county that Clinton won in 2016. With the election of Sheila Oliver as lieutenant governor, she became the first woman of color elected to statewide office in New Jersey. 38.5% of registered voters cast ballots, marking the lowest turnout on record for any gubernatorial election in New Jersey. Guadagno later left the Republican Party in July 2021.

2017 was the first New Jersey gubernatorial election since 1989 in which the Democratic candidate won Somerset County, as well as the first since 2005 in which the Democratic candidate won Burlington County, Middlesex County, Atlantic County, or Gloucester County. Murphy became the first New Jersey governor since Brendan Byrne in 1973 to win without any prior elected experience, and the first since Charles Edison in 1940 to win without having held any prior public office in the state. This is the first gubernatorial election since 1937 in which the Democratic nominee won without winning Salem County, and the first since 1981 in which it voted for the losing candidate.

== Background ==
Primary elections took place on June 6, 2017. New Jersey utilizes a semi-closed primary system, meaning that only registered party members may vote in primary elections. However, unaffiliated voters can change their party registration and vote in either party primary on election day.

The deadline to file petitions to qualify for primary elections was April 3; eleven contenders submitted petitions satisfying the requirement of 1,000 signatures. On April 18, as is required by the New Jersey Election Law Enforcement Commission, the candidates' financial disclosures, showing sources of earned income (e.g. salaries) and unearned income (e.g. investments), were made public.

Gubernatorial primary candidates utilized what is known as the "matching funds" program. Those who raised at least $430,000 qualified to receive two dollars in public money for every dollar raised privately. State law mandates that any primary candidates who qualify for matching funds must participate in at least two primary debates. Candidates who choose not to seek matching funds but commit to raising and spending at least $430,000 can also participate. As of May 8, primary candidates had received donations from ten states other than New Jersey.

The first debates were held on May 9, hosted by Stockton University. The Republicans debated first followed by the Democrats. The debates were live-streamed on Facebook, the university's website via Livestream, and on News 12 New Jersey. The live stream was simulcast in Spanish. The second Democratic debate was held on May 11, the second Republican debate on May 18. They were co-hosted by PBS Member network NJTV and NJ Spotlight.

The Republican debates included two of the five candidates: Jack Ciattarelli and Kim Guadagno, who both qualified for matching funds. Hirsh Singh filed a lawsuit to enter the debates, claiming to have raised over $900,000 despite missing a deadline to file; his challenge was rejected by the state courts.

The Democratic debates included four of the six candidates: Jim Johnson, John Wisniewski (who both qualified for matching funds), Phil Murphy (who opted out of matching funds but had spent enough to qualify), and Raymond Lesniak (who did not raise enough to qualify for matching funds but loaned his campaign enough money to qualify for the debates).

== Republican primary ==
=== Candidates ===
==== Declared ====
- Jack Ciattarelli, state assemblyman
- Kim Guadagno, lieutenant governor and secretary of state
- Steven Rogers, Nutley commissioner of public affairs
- Joseph Rudy Rullo, businessman and candidate for the U.S. Senate in 2012
- Hirsh Singh, engineer and businessman

==== Withdrawn ====
- Dana Wefer, chairwoman of the Hoboken Housing Authority

==== Declined ====
- Jon Bramnick, minority leader of the New Jersey General Assembly (ran for reelection)
- Randy Brown, mayor of Evesham Township
- Michael J. Doherty, state senator (ran for reelection)
- Thomas Kean Jr., minority leader of the New Jersey Senate and son of former Governor Thomas Kean (ran for reelection)
- Kevin J. O'Toole, state senator
- Joe Piscopo, actor, comedian and radio show host

=== Fundraising ===
Primary campaign finance activity through June 23, 2017
| Candidate | Raised | Spent | Cash on hand |
|---|---|---|---|
| Jack Ciattarelli | $1,768,417 | $1,731,962 | $36,337 |
| Kim Guadagno | $3,540,927 | $3,451,743 | $89,184 |
| Steven Rogers | $27,522 | $27,522 | $0 |
| Joseph Rudy Rullo | $13,573 | $9,809 | $64 |
| Hirsh Singh | $1,021,387 | $1,016,191 | $5,196 |
Source: New Jersey Election Law Enforcement Commission

=== Endorsements ===
Jack Ciattarelli

State officials

- Dawn Marie Addiego, state senator
- Christopher Bateman, state senator
- John DiMaio, state assemblyman
- Joe Howarth, state assemblyman
- Maria Rodriguez-Gregg, state assemblywoman
- Donna Simon, former state assemblywoman

Newspapers and publications

- The Philadelphia Inquirer
- The Record
- The Star-Ledger

=== Polling ===
| Poll source | Date(s) administered | Sample size (Note: Key: A – all adults RV – registered voters LV – likely voters V – unclear) | Margin of error | Jack Ciattarelli | Kim Guadagno | Steven Rogers | Joseph Rudy Rullo | Hirsh Singh | Other | Undecided |
|---|---|---|---|---|---|---|---|---|---|---|
| Stockton University | May 16–23, 2017 | 389 (LV) | ± 4.9% | 18% | 37% | 4% | 3% | 3% | 2% | 31% |
| Stockton University | April 26 – May 1, 2017 | 359 (RV) | – | 19% | 29% | 4% | 4% | 2% | 1% | 41% |
| Quinnipiac University | April 26 – May 1, 2017 | 331 (RV) | ± 5.4% | 12% | 23% | 5% | 3% | — | a1% | 51% |
| Fairleigh Dickinson University | March 22–26, 2017 | 216 (RV) | ± 6.7% | 5% | 24% | 1% | 1% | 0% | 14% (Note: Dana Wefer 2%, "Someone else" 12%) | 54% |
| Quinnipiac University | March 9–13, 2017 | 315 (RV) | ± 5.5% | 3% | 28% | 2% | 1% | — | 19% (Note: Joe Piscopo 18%, "Someone else" 1%) | 42% |
| Fairleigh Dickinson University | January 25–29, 2017 | 275 (RV) | ± 5.9% | 2% | 18% | 2% | 0% | — | 25% (Note: Joe Piscopo 12%, "Someone else" 13%) | 52% |

Hypothetical polling

| Poll source | Date(s) administered | Sample size | Margin of error | Jon Bramnick | Kim Guadagno | Other | Undecided |
|---|---|---|---|---|---|---|---|
| FDU | September 1–7, 2014 | 721 | ± 3.7% | 4% | 12% | 11% | 74% |

=== Results ===
Results by county: Guadagno: 60–70%; 50–60%; 40–50%; <40%; Ciattarelli: 50–60%; 40–50%; <40%

Republican primary results
| Party | Candidate | Votes | % |
|---|---|---|---|
| Republican | Kim Guadagno | 113,846 | 46.70% |
| Republican | Jack Ciattarelli | 75,556 | 30.99% |
| Republican | Hirsh Singh | 23,728 | 9.73% |
| Republican | Joseph R. Rullo | 15,816 | 6.49% |
| Republican | Steven Rogers | 14,187 | 5.82% |
| Write-in | | 638 | 0.27% |
| Total votes | | 243,771 | 100.0% |

== Democratic primary ==
=== Candidates ===
==== Declared ====
- Bill Brennan, activist and former firefighter
- Jim Johnson, former U.S. under secretary of the treasury for enforcement
- Raymond Lesniak, state senator and former chairman of the New Jersey Democratic State Committee
- Phil Murphy, former U.S. ambassador to Germany and former Goldman Sachs executive
- John Wisniewski, state assemblyman and former chairman of the New Jersey Democratic State Committee
- Mark Zinna, Tenafly Borough Council president

==== Withdrawn ====
- Paul Binetti, LGBT activist and nightclub manager
- Monica Brinson, pharmaceutical sales representative
- Bob Hoatson, sexual abuse victims advocate and former Catholic priest
- Lisa McCormick, weekly newspaper publisher
- Titus Pierce, businessman and Iraq War veteran

==== Declined ====
- Cory Booker, U.S. senator
- Tom Byrne, former chairman of the New Jersey Democratic State Committee and son of former Governor Brendan Byrne
- Richard Codey, state senator and former governor (running for re-election)
- Joseph N. DiVincenzo Jr., Essex County executive
- Steven Fulop, mayor of Jersey City (running for re-election)
- Rush Holt Jr., former U.S. representative
- Michael Murphy, lobbyist and candidate for governor in 1997
- Robert Russo, deputy mayor of Montclair Township
- Shavonda E. Sumter, state assemblywoman (running for re-election)
- Stephen M. Sweeney, president of the New Jersey Senate (running for re-election)

=== Fundraising ===
Primary campaign finance activity through June 23, 2017
| Candidate | Raised | Spent | Cash on hand |
|---|---|---|---|
| Bill Brennan | $20,847 | $20,847 | $0 |
| Jim Johnson | $3,256,514 | $3,198,226 | $58,288 |
| Raymond Lesniak | $791,368 | $718,619 | $64,990 |
| Phil Murphy | $21,995,248 | $21,735,597 | $262,951 |
| John Wisniewski | $2,142,139 | $2,081,439 | $60,795 |
| Mark Zinna | $33,498 | $32,622 | $877 |
Source: New Jersey Election Law Enforcement Commission

=== Endorsements ===
Jim Johnson

U.S. representatives

- Hakeem Jeffries, New York

Mayors

- David Dinkins, New York City (former)

Individuals

- Jack Antonoff, musician, singer, songwriter, and record producer
- Lena Dunham, actress, writer, producer, and director
- Courtney B. Vance, actor
Raymond Lesniak

Individuals

- Steven Goldstein, founder and former executive director of Garden State Equality
- Mike Markarian, president of the Humane Society Legislative Fund
- Lisa McCormick, former gubernatorial candidate
Lisa McCormick (withdrew)

Individual

- Jan Rose Kasmir, activist
John Wisniewski

Organizations

- National Nurses United
- Princeton Community Democratic Organization

Individuals

- Larry Hamm, activist
- Jeff Weaver, campaign manager for Bernie Sanders (former)
Declined to endorse

Elected officials

- Bernie Sanders, U.S. senator from Vermont

=== Polling ===
| Poll source | Date(s) administered | Sample size | Margin of error | Bill Brennan | Jim Johnson | Raymond Lesniak | Phil Murphy | John Wisniewski | Mark Zinna | Other | Undecided |
|---|---|---|---|---|---|---|---|---|---|---|---|
| Stockton University | May 16–23, 2017 | 403 (LV) | ± 4.9% | 3% | 10% | 4% | 34% | 9% | 1% | 1% | 33% |
| Stockton University | April 26 – May 1, 2017 | 385 (RV) | – | 2% | 6% | 5% | 37% | 8% | 0% | — | 41% |
| Quinnipiac University | April 26 – May 1, 2017 | 519 (RV) | ± 4.3% | 3% | 7% | 4% | 26% | 5% | 1% | 1% | 52% |
| The Mellman Group | April 26–30, 2017 | 600 (LV) | ± 4.0% | 0% | 4% | 3% | 37% | 7% | 0% | — | 49% |
| Fairleigh Dickinson University | March 22–26, 2017 | 386 (RV) | ± 5.0% | 2% | 4% | 3% | 23% | 4% | 0% | 10% (Note: Lisa McCormick 2%, Monica Brinson 1%, Bob Hoatson 1%, Titus Pierce 0%, "Someone else" 6%) | 53% |
| Quinnipiac University | March 9–13, 2017 | 450 (RV) | ± 4.6% | 2% | 4% | 4% | 23% | 6% | — | — | 57% |
| Fairleigh Dickinson University | January 25–29, 2017 | 410 | ± 4.8% | — | 2% | 7% | 17% | 6% | — | 17% | 50% |
| Lake Research Partners (Note: Poll sponsored by Johnson's campaign) | November 17–21, 2016 | 400 (LV) | ± 4.9% | — | 8% | — | 22% | 10% | — | — | 59% |

Hypothetical polling

| Poll source | Date(s) administered | Sample | Margin of error | Richard Codey | Steven Fulop | Stephen M. Sweeney | Other | Undecided |
|---|---|---|---|---|---|---|---|---|
| FDU | September 1–7, 2014 | 721 | ± 3.7% | 27% | 3% | 9% | 6% | 55% |

=== Results ===
Results by county: Murphy: 50–60%; 40–50%; <40%; Wisniewski: <40%

Democratic primary results
| Party | Candidate | Votes | % |
|---|---|---|---|
| Democratic | Phil Murphy | 243,643 | 48.37% |
| Democratic | Jim Johnson | 110,250 | 21.89% |
| Democratic | John Wisniewski | 108,532 | 21.55% |
| Democratic | Raymond J. Lesniak | 24,318 | 4.83% |
| Democratic | William Brennan | 11,263 | 2.24% |
| Democratic | Mark Zinna | 5,213 | 1.03% |
| Write-in | | 463 | 0.09% |
| Total votes | | 503,682 | 100.0% |

== Third parties and independents ==
=== Declared ===
- Gina Genovese (Independent), former mayor of Long Hill
- Seth Kaper-Dale (Green), pastor
- Matt Riccardi (Constitution), Marine veteran
- Pete Rohrman (Libertarian), retired U.S. Marine and nominee for Bergen County freeholder in 2015 and 2016
- Vincent Ross (Independent), electrician

=== Withdrawn ===
- Karese Laguerre (Independent), dental hygienist (running for lieutenant governor on the Libertarian ticket)
- Jonathan Lancelot (Independent), computer technician
- Mike Price (Independent), businessman

=== Declined ===
- Joe Piscopo (Independent), actor, comedian, and radio show host

== General election ==
Seven candidates were on the ballot in the November general election, the least in a New Jersey gubernatorial contest since six ran in 1989.

=== Candidates ===
==== Major ====
The following candidates qualified to appear in the state-sponsored debates:

- Kim Guadagno (Republican), lieutenant governor and secretary of state of New Jersey
  - Running mate: Carlos Rendo, mayor of Woodcliff Lake
- Phil Murphy (Democratic), former United States ambassador to Germany and former Goldman Sachs executive
  - Running mate: Sheila Oliver, state assemblywoman and former speaker of the New Jersey General Assembly

==== Minor ====
The following third-party or independent candidates qualified for the ballot but did not raise enough money to qualify for state-sponsored debates:

- Gina Genovese (Reduce Property Taxes), former mayor of Long Hill
  - Running mate: none (Genovese initially named Democratic campaign operative Derel Stroud as a running mate, who would later withdraw. No replacement was selected.)
- Seth Kaper-Dale (Green), pastor
  - Running mate: Lisa Durden, media commentator and former Essex County College adjunct communications professor
- Matt Riccardi (Constitution), Marine veteran
  - Running mate: None
- Pete Rohrman (Libertarian), retired U.S. Marine and nominee for Bergen County freeholder in 2015 and 2016
  - Running mate: Karese Laguerre, dental hygienist
- Vincent Ross (We The People), electrician
  - Running mate: April A. Johnson

=== Debates ===
| Dates | Location | Murphy | Guadagno | Link |
|---|---|---|---|---|
| October 10, 2017 | Newark, New Jersey | Participant | Participant | C-SPAN |
| October 18, 2017 | Wayne, New Jersey | Participant | Participant | C-SPAN |

=== Fundraising ===
General election campaign finance activity through November 24, 2017
| Candidate | Raised | Spent | Cash on hand |
|---|---|---|---|
| Kim Guadagno | $5,748,740 | $5,616,120 | $132,621 |
| Phil Murphy | $14,715,173 | $14,517,279 | $197,895 |
| Pete Rohrman (Note: Campaign finance activity through October 24, 2017 only) | $7,765 | $6,142 | $1,623 |
| Seth Kaper-Dale | $104,321 | $114,221 | –$2,701 |
| Matt Riccardi | N/A | N/A | N/A |
| Gina Genovese | $52,146 | $50,558 | $0 |
| Vincent Ross | <$5,100 | <$5,100 | <$5,100 |
Source: New Jersey Election Law Enforcement Commission

=== Endorsements ===
Kim Guadagno (R)

Federal politician

- Ronna Romney McDaniel, chair of the Republican National Committee

State politicians

- Jeb Bush, governor of Florida (former)
- Chris Christie, governor of New Jersey
- Thomas Kean, governor of New Jersey (former)
- Scott Walker, governor of Wisconsin
- Christine Todd Whitman, governor of New Jersey (former)

NJ state legislators

- Diane Allen, state senator
- Jennifer Beck, state senator
- Chris A. Brown, state assemblyman
- Anthony Bucco, state senator
- Robert D. Clifton, state assemblyman
- Ronald S. Dancer, state assemblyman
- BettyLou DeCroce, state assemblywoman
- Frank Gargiulo, former state assemblyman, former Hudson County GOP chairman, and North Bergen commissioner
- Amy Handlin, state assemblywoman
- Sean T. Kean, state assemblyman
- Nancy Munoz, state assemblywoman
- Declan O'Scanlon, state assemblyman
- Robert Singer, state senator
- Parker Space, state assemblyman
- Samuel D. Thompson, state senator

County freeholders

- Tom Arnone, Monmouth County
- James Bertino, Atlantic County
- Lillian G. Burry, Monmouth County
- Douglas Cabana, Morris County
- John P. Curley, Monmouth County
- Carman Daddario, Cumberland County
- Kathy DeFillippo, Morris County
- Leonard Desiderio, Cape May County
- Serena DiMaso, Monmouth County
- Frank Formica, Atlantic County
- Rick Gardner, Warren County
- Amy Gatto, Atlantic County
- E. Marie Hayes, Cape May County
- Thomas Mastrangelo, Morris County
- Will Morey, Cape May County
- Doug Painter, Salem County
- Sylvia Petillo, Sussex County
- Gary Rich, Monmouth County
- Jonathan Rose, Sussex County
- Jason Sarnoski, Warren County
- Jim Sauro, Cumberland County
- Deborah Smith, Morris County
- Ed Smith, Warren County
- Joseph Sparacio, Cumberland County
- Gerald M. Thornton, Cape May County
- Robert Walton, Hunterdon County

Mayors

- Randy Brown, Evesham Township
- Ellen Dickson, Summit
- Don Guardian, Atlantic City
- James R. Kern III, Pohatcong Township

Individuals

- Steve Forbes, businessman
- Tom Maoli, owner and dealer principal of the Celebrity Motorcar Company
- Joe Piscopo, actor, comedian, and radio show host
- John Sanchez, chairman of the Essex County Latino Chamber of Commerce
- Bill Spadea, businessman and television host

Organizations

- Associated Builders and Contractors
- Maggie's List
- National Federation of Independent Business
- New Jersey Outdoor Alliance
- NRA Political Victory Fund
- Orthodox Jewish Chamber of Commerce
- Women's Political Caucus of New Jersey

County Republican Party organizations

- Atlantic County
- Bergen County
- Camden County
- Cape May County
- Cumberland County
- Gloucester County
- Hudson County
- Monmouth County
- Morris County
- Ocean County
- Passaic County
- Salem County
- Sussex County
- Warren County

Newspapers (primary)

- New Jersey Hills

Newspapers (general)

- Asbury Park Press
- Daily Record
- New Jersey Herald
- New York Post
Phil Murphy (D)

Federal politicians

- Joe Biden, 47th vice president of the United States (former)
- Julian Castro, 16th United States secretary of housing and urban development (former)
- Bill Clinton, 42nd president of the United States (former)
- Hillary Clinton, 67th United States secretary of state (former)
- Al Gore, 45th vice president of the United States (former)
- Eric Holder, 82nd attorney general of the United States (former)
- John Kerry, 68th United States secretary of state (former)
- Barack Obama, 44th president of the United States (former)
- Tom Perez, chair of the Democratic National Committee

State politicians

- Richard Codey, governor of New Jersey (former)
- Howard Dean, Governor of Vermont (former)
- John Hickenlooper, governor of Colorado
- Jason Kander, secretary of state of Missouri (former)
- Terry McAuliffe, governor of Virginia
- Martin O'Malley, governor of Maryland (former)
- Kathleen Sebelius, governor of Kansas (former)

U.S. senators

- Cory Booker, New Jersey
- Bob Menendez, New Jersey

U.S. representatives

- Bonnie Watson Coleman, New Jersey
- Gabby Giffords, Arizona (former)
- Ben Ray Luján, New Mexico
- Donald Norcross, New Jersey
- Frank Pallone, New Jersey
- Maxine Waters, California

NJ state legislators

- Gordon M. Johnson, state assemblyman
- Raj Mukherji, state assemblyman
- Sheila Oliver, state assemblywoman and former speaker of the New Jersey General Assembly
- Vincent Prieto, state assemblyman and speaker of the New Jersey Assembly
- Brian P. Stack, state senator and mayor of Union City
- Loretta Weinberg, state senator

Mayors

- Wilda Diaz, Perth Amboy
- Steven Fulop, Jersey City
- Sharpe James, Newark (former)
- Richard LaBarbiera, Paramus

Individuals

- Jon Bon Jovi, lead singer-songwriter of Bon Jovi, record producer, philanthropist, and actor
- Chelsea Handler, actress
- Mark Hertling, former United States Army officer
- Mark Kelly, former astronaut
- Khizr Khan, father of Humayun Khan
- Alyssa Milano, activist and actress
- Shaquille O'Neal, former professional basketball player
- Adam Parkhomenko, political strategist

County Democratic Party organizations

- Atlantic County
- Bergen County
- Burlington County
- Camden County
- Cape May County
- Essex County
- Hudson County
- Hunterdon County
- Mercer County
- Middlesex County
- Monmouth County
- Morris County
- Ocean County
- Passaic County
- Salem County
- Somerset County
- Sussex County
- Union County
- Warren County

Organizations

- Amalgamated Transit Union
- American Federation of Teachers
- Planned Parenthood
- Sierra Club
- Working Families Party, cross-party endorsement

Newspapers (primary)

- New Jersey Hills
- The Philadelphia Inquirer
- The Record
- The Star-Ledger

Newspapers (general)

- Courier News/Home News Tribune
- Courier-Post/The Daily Journal
- New Jersey Hills
- The New York Times
- The Philadelphia Inquirer
- The Record
- The Star-Ledger
Declined to endorse

Newspapers

- The Trentonian

=== Predictions ===
| Source | Ranking | As of |
|---|---|---|
| The Cook Political Report | Likely D (flip) | October 6, 2017 |
| Sabato's Crystal Ball | Safe D (flip) | October 13, 2017 |
| Rothenberg Political Report | Likely D (flip) | October 27, 2017 |

=== Polling ===
| Poll source | Date(s) administered | Sample size | Margin of error | Kim Guadagno (R) | Phil Murphy (D) | Other | Undecided |
|---|---|---|---|---|---|---|---|
| Change Research | November 1–5, 2017 | 2,040 (LV) | ± 2.8% | 42% | 58% | – | – |
| Quinnipiac University | October 30 – November 5, 2017 | 662 (LV) | ± 5.2% | 41% | 53% | – | 5% |
| Rasmussen Reports | October 31 – November 1, 2017 | 800 (LV) | ± 4.0% | 35% | 50% | 5% | 10% |
| Gravis Marketing | October 30 – November 1, 2017 | 611 (LV) | ± 4.0% | 32% | 46% | 7% (Note: Gina Genovese (I) 4%, Seth Kaper-Dale (G) 3%) | 15% |
| Monmouth University | October 27–31, 2017 | 529 (LV) | ± 4.3% | 39% | 53% | 2% | 7% |
| Emerson College | October 26–28, 2017 | 540 (LV) | ± 4.2% | 31% | 47% | 8% | 14% |
| Suffolk University | October 25–28, 2017 | 500 (LV) | ± 4.4% | 33% | 49% | 6% (Note: Gina Genovese (I) 2%, Seth Kaper-Dale (G) 1%, Matt Riccardi (C) 1%, Pete Rohrman (L) 1%, Vincent Ross (I) 1%) | 12% |
| Quinnipiac University | October 19–24, 2017 | 1,049 (LV) | ± 4.2% | 37% | 57% | 1% | 5% |
| Stockton University | October 18–24, 2017 | 525 (LV) | ± 4.3% | 37% | 51% | 4% | 7% |
| FOX News | October 14–16, 2017 | 679 (LV) | ± 3.5% | 33% | 47% | 8% | 11% |
| FOX News | October 14–16, 2017 | 804 (RV) | ± 3.5% | 31% | 46% | 9% | 13% |
| Fairleigh Dickinson University | October 11–15, 2017 | 658 (LV) | ± 4.5% | 32% | 47% | 5% | 13% |
| Stockton University | October 4–12, 2017 | 585 (LV) | ± 4.1% | 33% | 51% | 7% | 7% |
| Monmouth University | September 28 – October 1, 2017 | 452 (LV) | ± 4.6% | 37% | 51% | 2% | 9% |
| Emerson College | September 28 – October 1, 2017 | 300 (RV) | ± 5.6% | 35% | 46% | 7% (Note: Gina Genovese (I) 2%, "Someone else" 5%) | 12% |
| Suffolk University | September 19–23, 2017 | 500 (RV) | ± 4.4% | 25% | 44% | 6% (Note: Gina Genovese (I) 2%, Pete Rohrman (L) 2%, Seth Kaper-Dale (G) 1%, Vincent Ross (I) 1%, Matt Riccardi (C) <1%) | 24% |
| FOX News | September 17–19, 2017 | 804 (RV) | ± 3.5% | 29% | 42% | 9% (Note: Gina Genovese (I) 4%, Seth Kaper-Dale (G) 2%, Pete Rohrman (L) 1%, Other 2%) | 19% |
| Quinnipiac University | September 7–12, 2017 | 875 (LV) | ± 4.5% | 33% | 58% | 2% | 7% |
| Marist College | July 13–18, 2017 | 817 (RV) | ± 3.4% | 33% | 54% | 1% | 12% |
| Monmouth University | July 6–9, 2017 | 758 (RV) | ± 3.6% | 26% | 53% | 6% | 14% |
| National Research Inc. (R) (Note: Poll sponsored by Guadagno's campaign) | June 25–27, 2017 | 600 (LV) | ± 4.0% | 28% | 42% | 9% | 21% |
| Quinnipiac University | June 7–12, 2017 | 1,103 (RV) | ± 3.8% | 26% | 55% | 3% | 14% |
| Quinnipiac University | April 26 – May 1, 2017 | 1,209 (RV) | ± 2.8% | 25% | 50% | 1% | 21% |
| Quinnipiac University | March 9–13, 2017 | 1,098 (RV) | ± 3.0% | 25% | 47% | 1% | 25% |
| Quinnipiac University | January 26–30, 2017 | 1,240 (RV) | ± 2.8% | 29% | 45% | 1% | 22% |

Hypothetical polling

| Poll source | Date(s) administered | Sample size | Margin of error | Kim Guadagno (R) | Phil Murphy (D) | Joe Piscopo (I) | Undecided |
|---|---|---|---|---|---|---|---|
| Quinnipiac University | April 26 – May 1, 2017 | 1,209 (V) | ± 2.8% | 21% | 41% | 14% | 21% |

== Results ==
2017 New Jersey gubernatorial election
| Party | Candidate | Votes | % | ±% |
|---|---|---|---|---|
| Democratic | Phil Murphy | 1,203,110 | 56.03% | +17.84% |
| Republican | Kim Guadagno | 899,583 | 41.89% | −18.41% |
| Independent | Gina Genovese | 12,294 | 0.57% | – |
| Libertarian | Peter J. Rohrman | 10,531 | 0.49% | −0.08% |
| Green | Seth Kaper-Dale | 10,053 | 0.47% | +0.08% |
| Constitution | Matthew Riccardi | 6,864 | 0.32% | – |
| Independent | Vincent Ross | 4,980 | 0.29% | – |
| Total votes | | 2,147,415 | 100.0% | N/A |
| Democratic gain from Republican | | | | |

=== By county ===
| County | Kim Guadagno Republican | | Phil Murphy Democratic | | Various candidates Other parties | | Margin | | Total votes cast |
| County | # | % | # | % | # | % | # | % | Total votes cast |
|---|---|---|---|---|---|---|---|---|---|
| Atlantic | 28,456 | 42.46% | 36,952 | 55.14% | 1,607 | 2.40% | 8,496 | 12.68% | 67,015 |
| Bergen | 94,904 | 41.64% | 129,265 | 56.71% | 3,760 | 1.65% | 34,361 | 15.07% | 227,929 |
| Burlington | 52,191 | 41.85% | 70,453 | 56.49% | 2,070 | 1.66% | 18,262 | 14.64% | 124,714 |
| Camden | 37,113 | 30.69% | 81,268 | 67.21% | 2,534 | 2.06% | 44,155 | 36.52% | 120,915 |
| Cape May | 16,118 | 53.22% | 13,566 | 44.80% | 600 | 1.98% | -2,552 | -8.42% | 30,284 |
| Cumberland | 11,876 | 41.83% | 15,686 | 55.25% | 828 | 2.92% | 3,810 | 13.42% | 28,390 |
| Essex | 30,633 | 18.83% | 129,470 | 79.58% | 2,598 | 1.60% | 98,837 | 60.75% | 162,701 |
| Gloucester | 32,448 | 42.31% | 42,349 | 55.22% | 1,898 | 2.47% | 9,901 | 12.91% | 76,695 |
| Hudson | 19,236 | 17.54% | 88,271 | 80.48% | 2,170 | 1.98% | 69,035 | 62.94% | 109,677 |
| Hunterdon | 26,708 | 58.89% | 17,697 | 39.02% | 945 | 2.08% | -9,011 | -19.87% | 45,350 |
| Mercer | 30,645 | 33.14% | 59,992 | 64.87% | 1,846 | 2.00% | 29,347 | 31.73% | 92,483 |
| Middlesex | 70,940 | 40.26% | 100,847 | 57.23% | 4,418 | 2.51% | 29,907 | 16.97% | 176,205 |
| Monmouth | 101,525 | 55.02% | 79,432 | 43.05% | 3,572 | 1.94% | -22,093 | -11.97% | 184,529 |
| Morris | 77,203 | 53.12% | 65,507 | 45.08% | 2,617 | 1.80% | -11,696 | -8.04% | 145,327 |
| Ocean | 98,135 | 62.30% | 56,582 | 35.92% | 2,808 | 1.78% | -41,553 | -26.38% | 157,525 |
| Passaic | 36,230 | 38.00% | 57,415 | 60.15% | 1,810 | 1.90% | 21,185 | 22.15% | 95,455 |
| Salem | 8,629 | 50.07% | 7,814 | 45.34% | 794 | 4.61% | -815 | -4.73% | 17,234 |
| Somerset | 44,231 | 47.93% | 45,935 | 49.78% | 2,107 | 2.28% | 1,704 | 1.85% | 92,273 |
| Sussex | 25,401 | 59.82% | 15,431 | 36.34% | 1,717 | 4.04% | -9,970 | -23.48% | 42,459 |
| Union | 39,552 | 32.62% | 79,113 | 65.24% | 2,594 | 2.14% | 39,561 | 32.62% | 121,259 |
| Warren | 17,409 | 61.23% | 10,065 | 35.40% | 958 | 3.37% | -6,804 | -25.83% | 28,432 |
| Totals | 899,583 | 41.89% | 1,203,110 | 56.03% | 44,722 | 2.14% | 303,527 | 14.14% | 2,147,415 |

Counties that flipped from Republican to Democratic

- Atlantic (largest municipality: Egg Harbor Township)
- Bergen (largest municipality: Hackensack)
- Burlington (largest municipality: Evesham)
- Camden (largest municipality: Cherry Hill)
- Cumberland (largest municipality: Vineland)
- Gloucester (largest municipality: Washington Township)
- Mercer (largest municipality: Hamilton Township)
- Middlesex (largest municipality: Edison)
- Passaic (largest municipality: Paterson)
- Somerset (largest municipality: Franklin Township)
- Union (largest municipality: Elizabeth)

=== By congressional district ===
Murphy won nine of 12 congressional districts, including two held by Republicans.

| District | Murphy | Guadagno | Representative |
|---|---|---|---|
| 1st | 65% | 33% | Donald Norcross |
| 2nd | 50% | 47% | Frank LoBiondo |
| 3rd | 47% | 51% | Tom MacArthur |
| 4th | 42% | 56% | Chris Smith |
| 5th | 49.0% | 48.8% | Josh Gottheimer |
| 6th | 55% | 43% | Frank Pallone |
| 7th | 46% | 52% | Leonard Lance |
| 8th | 81% | 17% | Albio Sires |
| 9th | 66% | 32% | Bill Pascrell |
| 10th | 87% | 11% | Donald Payne Jr. |
| 11th | 50% | 49% | Rodney Frelinghuysen |
| 12th | 63% | 35% | Bonnie Watson Coleman |

== Exit poll ==
2017 New Jersey gubernatorial election voter demographics (CNN)
| Demographic subgroup | Murphy | Guadagno | % of total vote |
Ideology
| Liberals | 94 | 4 | 32 |
| Moderates | 50 | 49 | 46 |
| Conservatives | 14 | 84 | 22 |
Party
| Democrats | 93 | 6 | 43 |
| Republicans | 7 | 92 | 29 |
| Independents | 50 | 46 | 28 |
Donald Trump job approval
| Approve | 12 | 87 | 36 |
| Disapprove | 82 | 16 | 63 |
Issue mattered most in your vote for governor
| Corruption | 68 | 30 | 34 |
| Health care | 86 | 12 | 19 |
| Immigration | 42 | 58 | 10 |
| Property taxes | 31 | 68 | 29 |
Gender
| Men | 56 | 41 | 47 |
| Women | 55 | 43 | 53 |
Income
| $200,000 or more | 52 | 48 | 15 |
| $100,000–$200,000 | 50 | 49 | 36 |
| $50,000–$100,000 | 55 | 42 | 27 |
| $30,000–$50,000 | 67 | 31 | 14 |
Race/ethnicity
| White | 45 | 53 | 72 |
| Latino | 82 | 17 | 5 |
| Black | 94 | 4 | 16 |
Race by gender
| White men | 46 | 50 | 34 |
| White women | 44 | 55 | 39 |
| Black men | N/A | N/A | 5 |
| Black women | 94 | 4 | 5 |
| Latino men | 74 | 25 | 6 |
| Latina women | 88 | 11 | 7 |
| All others | 65 | 32 | 3 |
Age
| 18–29 years old | 73 | 25 | 11 |
| 30–44 years old | 63 | 34 | 21 |
| 45–64 years old | 54 | 44 | 45 |
| 65 and older | 44 | 55 | 24 |
Region
| Urban north | 76 | 22 | 19 |
| Suburban north | 59 | 39 | 15 |
| Northwest | 43 | 55 | 17 |
| Central | 53 | 45 | 20 |
| South | 50 | 47 | 29 |
Education
| College graduate | 57 | 41 | 58 |
| No college degree | 54 | 44 | 42 |
Education by race
| White college graduates | 50 | 48 | 44 |
| Non-white college graduates | 80 | 18 | 14 |
| Whites without college | 38 | 60 | 28 |
| Non-whites without college | 86 | 13 | 14 |
Education by gender and race
| White women with college degrees | 51 | 49 | 23 |
| White women without college degrees | 35 | 63 | 15 |
| White men with college degrees | 50 | 47 | 20 |
| White men without college degrees | 40 | 56 | 13 |
| Voters of color | 83 | 15 | 28 |
Educational attainment
| Postgraduate study | 61 | 36 | 25 |
| College graduate | 54 | 45 | 32 |
| Some college | 53 | 45 | 26 |
| High school or less | 44 | 55 | 16 |

== See also ==
- 2017 United States elections
- 2017 New Jersey elections
- 2017 New Jersey General Assembly election

== Notes ==
Partisan clients
