= The Progress =

American newspaper in New Jersey, founded 1911

- Type: Weekly newspaper
- Owner(s): New Jersey Hills Media Group
- Headquarters: Suite 104 100 South Jefferson Road Whippany, NJ 07981
- Website: www.newjerseyhills.com/the_progress

The Progress is a weekly newspaper that covers the six towns in the western area of Essex County, New Jersey: Caldwell, North Caldwell, West Caldwell, Fairfield, Roseland and Essex Fells. The newspaper was founded in 1911. The last available source for paid circulation shows the reach of this small town newspaper, with weekly paid circulation of 3,905 in May 2014.

The Progress is owned by New Jersey Hills Media Group, which bought the independent newspaper from co-owners John A. Sullivan III and Jean Conlon in 1998. Conlon, of West Caldwell, started work at The Progress in 1969 and became co-owner and editor in 1987.

Rita Annan-Brady of Caldwell, who joined the paper as lifestyles editor in 1995, replaced Colleen McSpirit (Note: Start date as editor not available) as editor of The Progress in 1998; Annan-Brady relinquished that role to someone else in 2008, when she returned to lifestyles editor. By 2014, Lorie Greenspan was editor, when replaced by Russ Crespolini, who served as editor until September 2018. He was succeeded by Kathy Shwiff. She was succeeded by Claudia Ceva, sometime between November 2022 and April 2023.
