= Corporation for New Jersey Local Media =

U.S. non-profit media corporation

The Corporation for New Jersey Local Media (CNJLM) is a non-profit media corporation. In April 2022, it assumed ownership of the New Jersey Hills Media Group, making it the largest non-profit weekly newspaper chain in the United States. The mission of CNJLM is to create engaged and informed communities by revitalizing local journalism and innovating for its future.
