= Lisa Durden =

American journalist

- Born: 1963 or 1964 (age 62–63); Newark, New Jersey, U.S.
- Education: Seton Hall University
- Occupation: Media commentator • producer

Lisa Durden is a media commentator and producer. Durden was born and raised in Newark, New Jersey and graduated from Seton Hall University with a degree in journalism. She has provided commentary on The Kelly File and other television programs on subjects including racism, Black Lives Matter, and celebrity culture.

Durden hosted a talk show, The Lisa Durden Show, that aired on Newark and Manhattan public access cable channels. She was the associate producer for the documentary Brick City, and producer of the documentary Soul Food Junkies, which won the 2012 Grand Jury Prize of Best Documentary at the American Black Film Festival.

On June 6, 2017, Durden appeared on Fox News in an interview with Tucker Carlson, discussing a Black Lives Matter chapter that held a Memorial Day event exclusively for black people. Durden defended the chapter's actions, saying "Boo-hoo-hoo... You white people are angry because you couldn’t use your ‘white privilege’ card to get invited to the Black Lives Matter’s all-black Memorial Day celebration." Carlson responded by calling Durden "hostile and separatist and crazy" and "demented". Two days later, Durden was suspended from her position of adjunct professor at Essex County College in Newark. Two weeks later, she was fired. Durden described the experience as being "publicly lynched".

College president Anthony Munroe said the firing was in response to the college being "inundated" with concerns and fears expressed by students, faculty, and prospective students following Durden's remarks on television. Subsequently, the Foundation for Individual Rights and Expression sued the college for records about these complaints, and found that the college had received only one complaint before Durden was fired.

In 2017, Durden was the running mate of Seth Kaper-Dale, who was running for New Jersey Governor on the Green Party ticket. Kaper-Dale and Durdan received 0.47% of the votes.
