= New Jersey Hills Media Group =

Newspaper publisher in New Jersey

- Formerly: Recorder Community Newspapers
- Industry: Newspapers
- Founded: 1955
- Area served: New Jersey
- Key people: Amanda Richardson (publisher) Joe Territo (executive editor)
- Website: newjerseyhills.com

New Jersey Hills Media Group, formerly known as Recorder Community Newspapers, (Note: Archived website archive.org/web/20100927105009/http://newjerseyhills.com shows name was changed to New Jersey Hills Media Group by at least September 2010.) is a newspaper group based in Whippany, New Jersey and is the owner of twelve online and community newspapers. The company was founded in 1955, and is currently owned by the non-profit Corporation for New Jersey Local Media. Amanda Richardson, executive director of the Corporation for New Jersey Local Media, serves as publisher. Previously co-owners Steve and Elizabeth Parker were also co-publishers.

== Newspapers published ==
- Bernardsville News
- Chatham Courier
- Echoes-Sentinel
- Florham Park Eagle
- Hanover Eagle
- Hunterdon Review
- Madison Eagle
- Morris NewsBee
- Observer-Tribune
- West Morris Reporter
- The Citizen
- The Progress
