= Green Party of New Jersey =

New Jersey affiliate of the Green Party

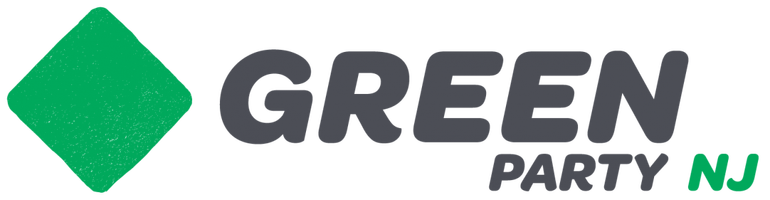
- Co-chairs: Jon Serrano; Ben Taylor
- Founders: Nick Mellis; Steve Welzer
- Founded: January 1997; 29 years ago
- Youth wing: Young Ecosocialists Caucus
- Membership (2026): ▼11,447
- Ideology: Green politics
- Political position: Left-wing
- National affiliation: Green Party of the United States
- Colors: Green
- Seats in the US Senate: 0 / 2
- Seats in the US House: 0 / 12
- Seats in the NJ Senate: 0 / 40
- Seats in the NJ House: 0 / 80
- Local offices: 2

Website
- gpnj.org

The Green Party of New Jersey is the state party organization for New Jersey of the Green Party of the United States. It was founded in January 1997 by Nick Mellis (chair from 2008 to 2009) and Steve Welzer.

== Activity ==
The Green Party of New Jersey is an active Green Party of the U.S. state affiliate, having nominated over 150 candidates for office since it began in 1997. The party experienced its first non-partisan electoral victory in 1999 when Gary Novosielski was elected to the Board of Education of the Rutherford School District.

In January 2003, Matt Ahearn, a New Jersey state legislator who had been elected to the New Jersey General Assembly as a Democrat in 2002, switched his registration to the Green Party, becoming the party's first state-level representative. Ahearn ran for re-election as a Green Party candidate in 2003 but lost to Robert M. Gordon, the Democratic candidate for office.

In 2012 2012, medical marijuana advocate Ken Wolski was the Green Party nominee for U.S. Senator. He finished fourth out of eleven candidates.

In May 2016, the Green Party of New Jersey saw a spike in registration with as many new voters in two months as it had in the past four years. By the end of 2016, there were 3,252 voters registered as Green.

In the 2016 election, Green Camden City Council candidate Gary Frazier received 6% of the vote, and Green Congressional candidates Raj Mailiah and Steve Welzer each received 0.7%.

The Green Party of New Jersey's 2017 gubernatorial candidate was Rev. Seth Kaper-Dale of Highland Park with Lisa R. Durden of Newark as his running mate. By November 2017, ten New Jersey counties had local affiliates recognized by the state party: Monmouth, Ocean, Atlantic, Gloucester, Essex, Camden, Bergen, Union, Mercer, and Morris.

Two candidates ran in the 2018 general election: professor and activist Madelyn Hoffman for U.S. Senate, and attorney and activist Diane Moxley for Congressional District 7. Hoffman received 25,150 votes and Moxley received 2,676 votes.

State party co-chair Craig Cayetano ran for Hawthorne Council in 2019 and 2020. Madelyn Hoffman ran for U.S. Senate again in the 2020 election, winning 38,288 votes and coming in third. Incumbent Jessica Clayton ran for a second term on the Brick, NJ school board and lost after a very close recount.

Green Party affiliate Dr. Corey Teague serves on the Paterson Board of Education after being elected in 2019 with the largest number of votes.

As of August 2021, there were 11,758 registered Greens in New Jersey. The party plans to run multiple candidates for state assembly and for statewide office, including governor, in future elections.

In preparation for the 2024 election, the Green Party of New Jersey has 13 candidates; Robin Brownfield (CD-01), Thomas Cannavo (CD-02), Steve Welzer (CD-03), Barry Bendar (CD-04), Beau Forte (CD-05), Herb Tarbous (CD-06), Andrew Black (CD-07), Christian Robins (CD-08), Benjamin Taylor (CD-09), Jon Serrano (CD-10), Lily Benavides (CD-11), and Kim Meudt (CD-12) and their Senatorial Candidate, Christina Khalil.

In July 2024, the Green Party of New Jersey held an event created to welcome Jill Stein as she introduced the so-called "Green 13" of New Jersey. She and the National Green Party have both endorsed the Green 13.

== Officeholders ==
=== Current ===
- Rev. Dr. Corey Teague, Commissioner, Board of Education, Paterson (2019–present)

=== Former ===
- Gary Novosielski, Board of Education, Rutherford (member April 1999-December 2015, president January 2014-December 2015).
- Jessica Clayton, Board of Education, Brick (2018-2020)

== Endorsed candidates ==
In 2019, Green Party endorsed candidate Corey Teague, who won a seat on the Paterson School Board.

== Election results ==
=== Governor ===
Year	Candidate	Votes
1997	Madelyn R. Hoffman	10,703 (0.44%)
2001	Jerry L. Coleman	6,238 (0.28%)
2005	Matthew Thieke	12,315 (0.54%)
2009	None	n/a
2013	Steve Welzer	8,295 (0.39%)
2017	Seth Kaper-Dale	10,053 (0.47%)
2021	Madelyn R. Hoffman	8,450 (0.32%)

=== U.S. House of Representatives ===
2024 General November Election
Candidate	Office	Votes	%
Robin Brownfield	Congressional District 1	5,771	1.6%
Thomas Cannavo	Congressional District 2	2,555	0.7%
Steven Welzer	Congressional District 3	3,478	0.9%
Barry Bendar	Congressional District 4	1,823	0.5%
Beau Forte	Congressional Distrist 5	3,428	.90%
Herb Tarbous	Congressional District 6	4,246	1.4%
Andrew Black	Congressional District 7	4,258	1.0%
Christian Robbins	Congressional District 8	5,465	2.8%
Benjamin Taylor	Congressional District 9	5,027	2.0%
Jon Carlos Serrano	Congressional District 10	3,198	1.3%
Lily Benavides	Congressional District 11	4,780	1.2%
Kim Meudt	Congressional District 12	4,652	1.4%

=== U.S. Senate ===
Year	Nominee	Votes	%
2018	Madelyn R. Hoffman	25,150	0.79
2020	Madelyn R. Hoffman	38,288	0.86
2024	Christina Khalil	26,934	0.90

=== Presidential nominee results ===
Year	Nominee	Votes
1996	Ralph Nader	32,465 (1.06%)
2000	Ralph Nader	94,554 (2.97%)
2004	David Cobb	1,807 (0.05%)
2008	Cynthia McKinney	3,636 (0.09%)
2012	Jill Stein	9,888 (0.27%)
2016	Jill Stein	37,772 (0.99%)
2020	Howie Hawkins	14,202 (0.31%)
2024	Jill Stein	42,090 (0.99%)

== Controversy ==
The New Jersey Green Party has been involved in internal party conflict in the Green Party US. The internal party conflict resulted in NJGP members leaving the party including most of The Green 13 from 2024.

== See also ==
- Seth Kaper-Dale
- Politics of New Jersey
- Government of New Jersey
- Elections in New Jersey
- Political party strength in New Jersey
- Law of New Jersey
- List of politics by U.S. state
