= Gina Genovese =

American businesswoman, former professional tennis player, and politician

Mayor of Long Hill Township, New Jersey
- In office 2006–2007
- Preceded by: David Welch
- Succeeded by: George Vitureira

Personal details
- Born: Gina Rose Genovese; April 30, 1959 (age 67) Newark, New Jersey, U.S.
- Party: Independent (2011–present)
- Other political affiliations: Democratic (before 2011)
- Spouse: Wendy McCahill (m. 2013)
- Profession: Small business owner

Gina Rose Genovese (born April 30, 1959) is an American businesswoman, former professional tennis player and politician from New Jersey. In 2006, Genovese become the first Democratic Party mayor in Long Hill Township's history and the first openly gay mayor in the state of New Jersey. She was an independent candidate in the 2017 New Jersey gubernatorial election.

== Early life and education ==
Genovese was born on April 30, 1959, in Newark and raised in Union Township, Union County, New Jersey. At age 12, Genovese moved to Berkeley Heights, New Jersey. She graduated from Kent Place School in Summit, New Jersey, in 1977.

== Professional tennis career ==
Genovese joined the Women's Tennis Association circuit in 1980. After attaining a world ranking of 150, she was forced to retire in 1981 due to injury. In 1983, Genovese opened Gina's Tennis World in Berkeley Heights. She has coached over 25 nationally ranked players and continues to own and operate the club.

== Political career ==
=== Mayoral term and 2007 state senate campaign ===
In 2004, Genovese ran for a seat on the Long Hill Township committee and defeated a four-time Republican incumbent, becoming the lone Democrat on the committee. In January 2006, Genovese was unanimously selected to become the township's first Democratic mayor and the first openly gay mayor in New Jersey.

Genovese resigned from the township committee in 2007 to run for New Jersey Senate in the 21st Legislative District, challenging Republican incumbent Tom Kean Jr. The district included Long Hill and several other towns in Essex, Morris, Somerset and Union counties. Genovese was unopposed in the Democratic primary and lost to Kean in the general election, receiving 20,092 votes to Kean's 29,795.

Genovese was one of New Jersey's 15 electors in the 2008 U.S. presidential election.

=== Courage to Connect NJ ===
In 2009, after extensive research in the field of municipal consolidation, Genovese formed the non-partisan, non-profit organization Courage To Connect NJ, which encourages property tax reform in New Jersey. Genovese serves as the organization's executive director and co-authored the Courage To Connect NJ Guidebook. She was an advocate of the 2013 merger of the Borough of Princeton and Princeton Township. In 2015, Genovese was presented the New Jersey Taxpayers’ Association Advocate Award in the category of Shared Services / Consolidation. In 2017, InsiderNJ included her in its Insider 100 Policymakers as "the state's leading expert on municipal consolidation."

=== 2017 New Jersey gubernatorial election ===
In April 2017, Genovese announced an independent bid for New Jersey governor, dedicating her candidacy to property tax reform. On July 25, Genovese selected political operative Derel Stroud of Plainfield as her running mate. In the November 7, 2017, general election, she received 0.57% of the vote.

== Personal life ==
Genovese resides in Long Hill Township with her partner, Wendy McCahill. The couple married in 2013.
