= 2017 New Jersey elections =

- November 7, 2017

A general election was held in the U.S. state of New Jersey on November 7, 2017. Primary elections were held on June 6. All elected offices at the state level were on the ballot in this election cycle, including Governor and Lieutenant Governor for four-year terms, all 80 seats in the New Jersey General Assembly for two-year terms, and all 40 seats in the State Senate for four-year terms. In addition to the gubernatorial and State Legislative elections, numerous county offices and Freeholders in addition to municipal offices were up for election. There were two statewide ballot questions and some counties and municipalities also had a local ballot question. Non-partisan local elections, some school board elections, and some fire district elections were also held throughout the year.

== Legislature ==
=== State Senate ===
2017 New Jersey State Senate election
- November 7, 2017

All 40 seats in the New Jersey Senate 21 seats needed for a majority
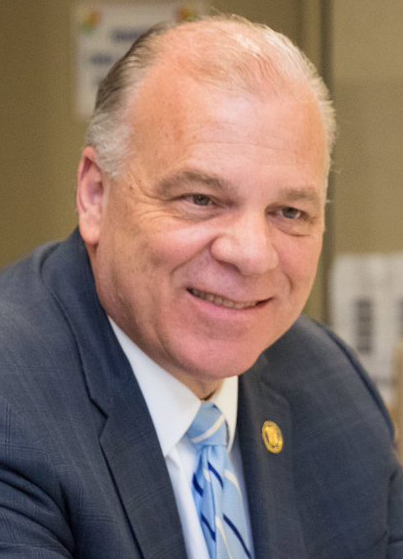

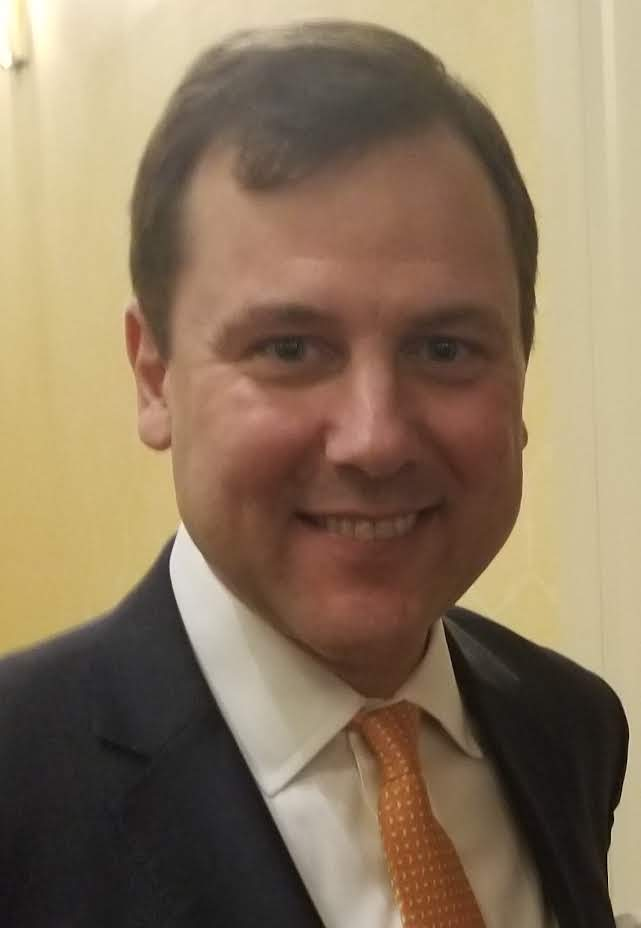
	Majority party	Minority party
Leader	Steve Sweeney	Thomas Kean Jr.
Party	Democratic	Republican
Leader since	January 12, 2010	January 8, 2008
Leader's seat	3rd district	21st district
Last election	24	16
Seats won	25	15
Seat change	▲1	▼1
Popular vote	1,185,420	802,418
Percentage	59.5%	40.3%
Swing	▲12.1%	▼11.8%
- Results by district Democratic hold Democratic gain Republican hold Republican gain
Senate President before election
Steve Sweeney
Democratic
Elected Senate President
Steve Sweeney
Democratic

All 40 seats of the New Jersey Senate were up for election. Prior to the elections, Democrats held a 24–16 majority in the upper house. Democrats picked up an open seat in District 7 and defeated a Republican incumbent in District 11, while Republicans defeated an appointed Democratic incumbent in District 2. Overall, this resulted in Democrats having a net gain of one seat, increasing their majority to 25–15.

==== Overall results ====
↓
25	15
Democratic	Republican

Parties	Candidates	Seats				Popular Vote		
Parties	Candidates	2013	2017	+/-	Strength	Vote	%	Change
Democratic	40	24	25	▲1	63%	1,177,295	59.1%	▲11.7%
Republican	37	16	15	▼1	38%	810,543	40.7%	▼11.4%
Green	1	0	0	Steady	0%	1,306	0.1%	N/A
Libertarian	1	0	0	Steady	0%	574	0.03%	▼0.02%
Independent	4	0	0	Steady	0%	2,545	0.1%	▼0.4%
Total	83	40	40	0	100.0%	1,992,263	100.0%	-

=== General Assembly ===
New Jersey General Assembly elections, 2017
- November 7, 2017

All 80 seats in the New Jersey General Assembly 41 seats needed for a majority
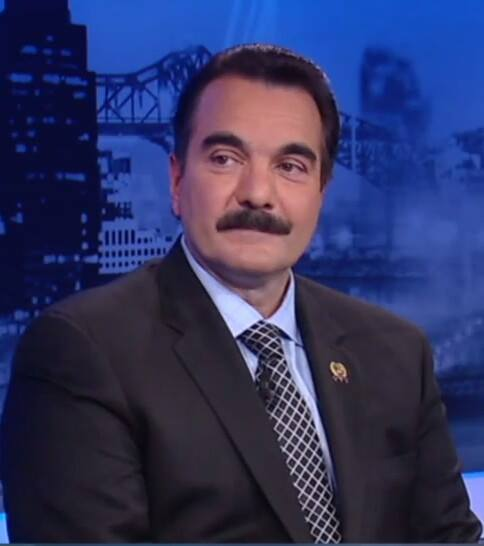
	Majority party	Minority party
Leader	Vincent Prieto (stepped down)	Jon Bramnick
Party	Democratic	Republican
Leader since	January 14, 2014	January 17, 2012
Leader's seat	32nd (Secaucus)	21st (Westfield)
Last election	52	28
Seats won	54	26
Seat change	▲2	▼2
Popular vote	2,266,879	1,613,865
Percentage	58.1%	41.4%
Swing	▲4.8%	▼4.5%
- Results: Democratic hold Democratic gain Republican hold
Speaker before election
Vincent Prieto
Democratic
Elected Speaker
Craig Coughlin
Democratic

All 80 seats of the New Jersey General Assembly were up for election. Prior to the elections, Democrats held a 52–28 majority in the lower house. Overall, the Democrats increased their majority by 2 to a supermajority at 54–26, thanks to holding all their seats as well as picking up open seats in District 2 and District 16.

==== Overall results ====
↓
54	26
Democratic	Republican

Parties	Candidates	Seats				Popular Vote		
Parties	Candidates	2015	2017	+/-	Strength	Vote	%	Change
Democratic	80	52	54	▲2	68%	2,266,879	58.1%	▲4.8%
Republican	78	28	26	▼2	33%	1,613,865	41.4%	▼4.5%
Green	4	0	0	Steady	0%	4,828	0.1%	▼0.3%
Libertarian	4	0	0	Steady	0%	2,804	0.1%	0.0%
Solidarity	1	0	0	Steady	0%	821	0.02%	N/A
Independent	14	0	0	Steady	0%	13,537	0.3%	0.0%
Total	181	80	80	0	100.0%	3,902,734	100.0%	-

== Ballot measures ==
Two statewide questions were on the ballot. Both were approved by voters:

- Public Question Number 1, a bond measure that would borrow $125 million to fund capital projects for public libraries.
- Public Question Number 2, a constitutional amendment that would require money collected from environmental contamination lawsuits to be used for cleanup and restoration efforts.

=== Polling ===
Question 1

Poll source	Date(s) administered	Sample size	Margin of error	Yes ✓	No ✗	Undecided
Stockton University	October 18–24, 2017	525 LV	± 4.3%	56%	39%	5%
Stockton University	October 4–12, 2017	585 LV	± 4.1%	48%	45%	6%

Question 2

Poll source	Date(s) administered	Sample size	Margin of error	Yes ✓	No ✗	Undecided
Stockton University	October 18–24, 2017	525 LV	± 4.3%	87%	9%	4%
Stockton University	October 4–12, 2017	585 LV	± 4.1%	79%	13%	8%

=== Results ===
Question 1

Question 1 Results by county Yes: 70–80%; 60–70%; 50–60%; No: 50–60%

Choice	Votes	%
Yes ✓	970,334	60.03
No ✗	646,110	39.97
Total votes	1,616,444	100

Question 2

Question 2 Results by county Yes: 70–80%; 60–70%

Choice	Votes	%
Yes ✓	1,093,448	69.02
No ✗	490,763	30.98
Total votes	1,584,211	100

== Local offices ==
Various county and municipal elections were held simultaneously, including elections for mayor in Atlantic City, Hoboken, and Jersey City.
