= Seth Kaper-Dale =

American pastor and activist

- Political party: Green
- Spouse: Stephanie Kaper-Dale
- Children: 3
- Education: Hope College; Princeton Theological Seminary

Ecclesiastical career
- Religion: Reformed Church
- Church: Reformed Church of Highland Park
- Title: Reverend

Seth Kaper-Dale is an American Protestant pastor and activist. He has been co-pastor at the Reformed Church of Highland Park (RCHP) in New Jersey since 2001. Before coming to RCHP, he spent time in both Ecuador and India. He was the Green Party candidate in the New Jersey gubernatorial election, 2017. He won 9,849, or 0.47%, of votes cast.

== Background and education ==
Seth Kaper-Dale was born in Montpelier, Vermont and attended Montpelier High School. He attended Hope College and then the Princeton Theological Seminary.

Kaper-Dale is married to Stephanie Kaper-Dale, co-pastor of the Reformed Church of Highland Park, with whom he has three children.

== Advocacy and activism ==
In 2006, Kaper-Dale co-founded the RCHP-Affordable Housing Corporation, which has created housing for women aging out of foster care, veterans, the homeless, the mentally ill, re-entering citizens, justice-involved youth, and refugees. He is also the co-founder of Who Is My Neighbor? Inc., a community development agency in Highland Park, New Jersey.

In 2012, he received national attention when his church became a sanctuary for Indonesian immigrants facing deportation.

In 2017, he intervened in a possible preemptive strike by ICE, in the presence of Governor Phil Murphy.

== Positions ==
Kapper-Dale supports legalization of marijuana and use of tax income to support treatment programs. He is a proponent of single-payer health care insurance.

== Electoral history ==
2017 New Jersey gubernatorial election
Party	Candidate	Votes	%	±%
Democratic	Phil Murphy	1,203,110	56.03	▲17.84
Republican	Kim Guadagno	899,583	41.89	▼18.41
Independent	Gina Genovese	12,294	0.57	New
Libertarian	Pete Rohrman	10,531	0.49	▼0.08
Green	Seth Kaper-Dale	10,053	0.47	▲0.08
Constitution	Matthew Ricciardi	6,864	0.32	N/A
Independent	Vincent Ross	4,980	0.29	New
Democratic gain from Republican		Swing		

== Bibliography ==
- A Voice for Justice (2013)
