= List of Elmhurst University alumni =

Elmhurst University is a Christian university in Elmhurst, Illinois. The university was Elmhurst Academy from 1871 to 1919, Elmhurst Junior College from 1919 to 1924, and Elmhurst College from 1924 to 2020. Following are some of its notable alumni.

== Education ==
- Peter M. Blau – (1942) sociologist and professor at the University of Chicago and Columbia University
- Cathy Davidson – (1970) history of technology scholar
- Glenn D. Lid – (1979) National Teachers Hall of Fame inductee and Golden Apple Award Teacher of Distinction
- H. Richard Niebuhr – (1912) sixth president of Elmhurst University, Elmhurst Proseminary graduate, and 20th-century theologian
- Joe Seger – (1957) archaeologist, Biblical scholar, and chairman of the Humanities Program at the University of Nebraska Omaha
- Kathleen Willis – (2000) former Elmhurst University librarian and member of the Illinois House of Representatives

== Entertainment ==
- Shirley Booz – (non-degreed) model and dancer
- Hannah Pearl Davis – anti-feminist social media commentator
- Brett Eldredge – country music singer, songwriter and record producer
- Terri Hemmert – (1970) WXRT-FM radio personality since 1973
- Bill Holman – (honorary) composer, arranger, conductor, saxophonist, and songwriter
- John-Paul Kaplan – record producer, composer, and pianist
- Kris Myers – (1999) musician (drummer) for progressive rock band Umphrey's McGee
- Guy Nardulli – (1997) actor and producer
- David Rasche – (1966) theater, film, and television actor

== Law ==
- William J. Bauer – (1949) judge on the United States Court of Appeals for the Seventh Circuit in Chicago
- Michael R. Galasso – (1958) former Chief Judge of the Circuit Court of DuPage County and Illinois Appellate Court judge, second district

== Literature and journalism ==
- Rane Arroyo – (1976) poet and Chicago Literary Hall of Fame recipient
- Bill Hillmann – author, storyteller, and journalist
- Anthony Opal – (2010) poet and editor
- Jack Stack – (1978) author and founder and CEO of SRC Holdings
- Joel Whitburn – (non-degreed) author and music historian

== Politics and government ==
- Anthony DeLuca – (1992) member of the Illinois House of Representatives, 80th district
- Beverly Fawell – (1952) former member of the Illinois House of Representatives and former member of the Illinois Senate
- Cindy Golding – member of the Iowa House of Representatives
- Barbara Kasekende – head of the Advisory Department at Uganda Development Bank
- Nancy Kaszak – Illinois House of Representatives
- Jacques Paul Klein – (1961) former Ambassador and retired United States Air Force Major General
- Arthur C. Lueder – Illinois Auditor of Public Accounts and postmaster of Chicago
- Eileen Lyons – Illinois House of Representatives
- George E. Sangmeister – (1957) former member of the United States House of Representatives, Illinois fourth district
- Kathleen Willis – (2000) former Elmhurst University librarian and member of the Illinois House of Representatives

== Religion ==
- Paul J. Achtemeier – (1949) theologian
- Donald G. Bloesch – (1950) theologian
- Walter Brueggemann – (1955) theologian
- John Dillenberger – (1940) theologian
- William R. Johnson – (1968) first openly gay minister to be ordained in a historic Protestant denomination
- H. Richard Niebuhr – (1912) 20th-century theologian, president of Elmhurst University, and Elmhurst Proseminary graduate
- Reinhold Niebuhr – (1910) Elmhurst Proseminary graduate and 20th-century theologian
- James M. Wall – (honorary) Methodist minister and editor of the Christian Advocate

== Science and technology ==
- Arthur Buikema – biologist and ecologist
- Emil Wolfgang Menzel Jr. – (1950) primatologist and psychologist
- Robert G. Sachs – (1987 Honorary) theoretical physicist

== Sports ==
- Steve Finch – (1982) former professional American football player who played wide receiver for one season for the Minnesota Vikings
- Chester "Swede" Johnston (non-degreed) former NFL football player who attended Elmhurst College 1929–1930
- Mike LaFleur – head coach of the Arizona Cardinals
- Ricardo Lamas – (2005) All-American wrestler; current mixed martial artist for the UFC's Featherweight Division, formerly with the WEC
- Matt McNamara – professional soccer player
- Jeff Quinn – (1984) assistant coach for the Notre Dame football team
- Joe Rau – (2013) All-American wrestler and National Champion; international level Greco-Roman wrestler and Team USA Olympian for Men's Greco-Roman Wrestling in the 97kg weight class at the 2024 Paris Games where he finished in 9th place
- Audrey Wagner – (1950) All-American Girls Professional Baseball League outfielder
- Dave Wills – (1989) former Chicago White Sox and Tampa Bay Rays radio announcer

== Other ==
- Jesse Anderson – (1984) convicted murderer
