= Roberta Naas =

American journalist and author (born 1958)

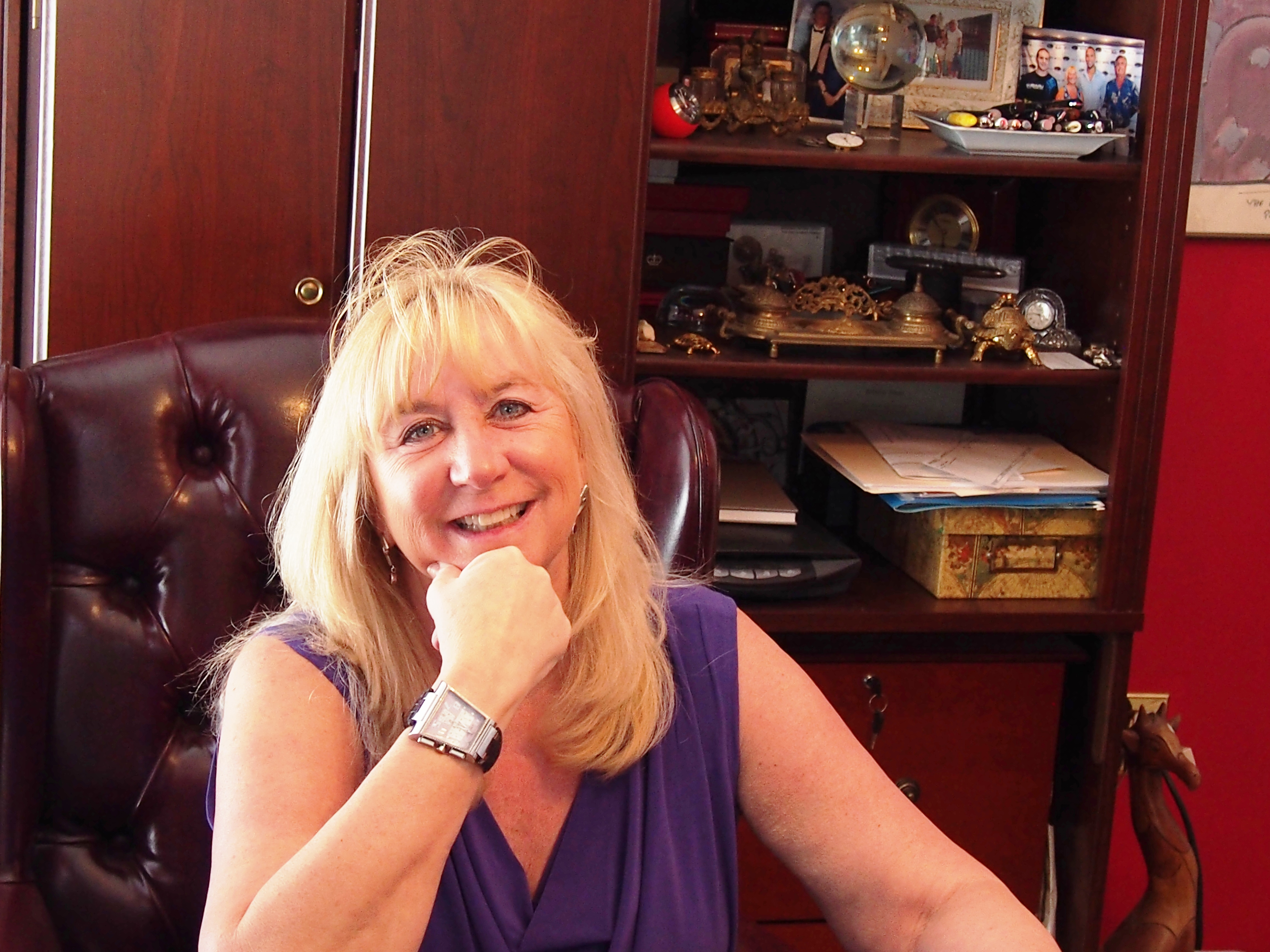
- Born: Roberta Naas; March 19, 1958 (age 68); Hawthorne, New Jersey, U.S.
- Education: Hawthorne High School; Rider University (BA); S. I. Newhouse School of Public Communications (MA)
- Occupations: Journalist, writer
- Writing career
- Notable awards: Gem Award

Roberta Naas (born March 19, 1958) is an American journalist and author. During her career she has specialized in the world of timepieces.

== Early years ==
Roberta Naas is a native of Hawthorne, New Jersey where she graduated from Hawthorne High School in 1976. Naas later attended Rider University in Lawrenceville, NJ, where she earned her Bachelor of Arts degree specializing in Journalism. While attending Rider University, she became a member of Sigma Delta Chi (Society of Professional Journalists) and of Alpha Lambda Delta (Leadership Society). She graduated Magna Cum Laude in June, 1980. Naas furthered her education by attending the S. I. Newhouse School of Public Communications at Syracuse University. She received a Master of Arts in newspaper journalism and graduated with honors in December 1981.

== Career ==
After beginning her journalism career covering the timepiece industry during the early 1980s, Roberta Naas formed Naas Enterprises LLC in 1991. Roberta is credited as the first female watch editor in the United States market. For the next five years Naas wrote the watch and jewelry editorial coverage for the Robb Report while writing for many other print publications.{ Beginning in 2001 spanning seven years, Naas worked closely with BW Publishing to write the approximate 500-page annual watch chronicles known as “Watches International.” She also co-created and developed the complimentary annual, “Grand Complications”– which she wrote for several years. Naas was on board as the timepiece editor with Niche Media for all of its regional titles for nearly 14 years.

Naas remains a full-time freelance writer and continues to contribute to for newspapers and magazines both in print and online around the world, including Forbes magazine’s online publication Forbes.com, Departures print and departures.com, Watchtime and a host of others.

In October 2010, Naas founded the watch magazine e-site/blog known as atimelyperspective.com which she owns and operates. Naas has covered the international timepiece industry for over three decades and today is renowned as an expert in watches. Naas has written thousands of newspaper and magazine articles on the subject, as well as six books on watches and the history of timekeeping. During her career Naas has interviewed Derek Jeter, LeBron James, William Baldwin, Diane Kruger, Susan Sarandon and Eric Ripert just to name a few. Roberta lives with her husband and two children in New Jersey where she is currently working on yet another book.

== Works ==
- Great Timepieces of the World (1998); ISBN 0-84782-093-9
- Master Wristwatches (1999); ISBN 0-84782-191-9
- Masters of the Millennium (2000); ISBN 0-84782-276-1
- Jewels of Time: The World of Women’s Watches (2011); ISBN 0-98308-310-X
- Times of Arabia (2012);
- Times of Arabia, Inspired by... (2014);

== Awards ==
2008 Gem award’s Award for Excellence in Watch Writing by the Jewelry Information Center.
