= Comedy Underground with Dave Attell =

US television program

- Starring: Dave Attell
- Country of origin: United States
- Original language: English
- No. of seasons: 1
- No. of episodes: 8

Production
- Running time: 22 minutes
- Production companies: Choadville Entertainment, Inc. 3 Arts Entertainment; Marobru Productions

Original release
- Network: Comedy Central
- Release: April 12 – May 31, 2014

Comedy Underground with Dave Attell is a stand-up comedy television series on Comedy Central. The series has featured fellow comics Jeff Ross, Amy Schumer, Jermaine Fowler, Ari Shaffir, Judah Friedlander, Brad Williams, Jay Oakerson, Nikki Glaser, Kurt Metzger, Ali Wong, Louis Katz, Junior Stopka, Luenell, Russ Meneve, April Macie, Ralphie May, Al Jackson, Jimmy Shubert, Tom Rhodes, Triumph the Insult Comic Dog, and Artie Lange.

== Episodes ==
Episodes of Comedy Underground with Dave Attell
No.	Guests	Original release date
1	Joe DeRosa, Jermaine Fowler, Jay Oakerson, Jeff Ross	April 12, 2014
2	Ari Shaffir, Pete Davidson, Brad Williams, Amy Schumer	April 19, 2014
3	Kurt Metzger, Nikki Glaser, Mike Vecchione, Triumph the Insult Comic Dog	April 26, 2014
4	Russ Meneve, April Macie, Ralphie May, Artie Lange	May 3, 2014
5	Lynne Koplitz, Milton Howery, Judah Friedlander	May 10, 2014
6	Louis Katz, Robert Kelly, Luenell, Jim Norton	May 17, 2014
7	Ali Wong, Junior Stopka, Jimmy Shubert	May 24, 2014
8	Jesse Joyce, Al Jackson, Tom Rhodes	May 31, 2014
