= DeMaio =

DeMaio is a surname. Notable people with the surname include:

- Carl DeMaio (born 1974), American politician
- Joey DeMaio (born 1954), American bass player and songwriter
- Tom DeMaio (born c. 1961), American football coach
