= Joseph Underwood =

Joseph Underwood may refer to:

- Joseph R. Underwood (1791–1876), lawyer, judge, U.S. Representative and Senator from Kentucky
- Joseph Underwood (merchant) (1779–1833), Australian merchant
- Joseph Edwin Underwood (1882–1960), civil engineer, land surveyor and political figure in Saskatchewan, Canada
- Joseph W. Underwood (born 1953), American teacher and football official
- Joseph F. Underwood, American politician, member of the Maine House of Representatives since 2020
