= Ed Van Put =

American fisherman and author (1936–2024)

Edward George Van Put (May 28, 1936 – December 14, 2024) was an American fisherman, author, and conservationist.

Born on May 28, 1936, in Paterson, New Jersey, Van Put was raised in Hawthorne, New Jersey, and graduated from Hawthorne High School.

When former president Jimmy Carter was attending a fundraising event for the Catskill Fly Fishing Center and Museum in September 1984, Van Put served as Carter's guide while fishing for rainbow trout along stretches of the upper Delaware River. Van Put admired the former president's work on the water, saying 'Mr. Carter made my guiding easy."

He died on December 14, 2024, at his home on Livingston Manor, New York.

== Books ==
- The Remarkable Life of James Beecher (2021)
- The Beaverkill: The History of a River and Its People (1996, 2016)
- Trout Fishing in the Catskills (2007)
