= Michael Terrizzi =

American football player and attorney (born 1953)

Mike Terrizzi
No. 7 – Purdue Boilermakers
- Position: Quarterback/punter

Personal information
- Born: October 29, 1953 (age 73); Paterson, New Jersey
- Listed height: 6 ft 3 in (1.91 m)
- Listed weight: 195 lb (88 kg)

Career information
- High school: Hawthorne (NJ)
- College: Purdue (1973–1974)

Michael Patrick Terrizzi (born October 29, 1953) is an American attorney and former football quarterback. A New Jersey native, he played college football at Purdue University in 1973 and 1974.

== Early life ==
Terrizzi was born in Paterson, New Jersey, and grew up in Hawthorne, New Jersey. He attended Hawthorne High School where, at 6'3" and 195 pounds, he played quarterback. He threw 23 touchdown passes as a senior and led the Hawthorne football team to two consecutive undefeated seasons. He was also selected by the Associated Press as the quarterback on the 1970 all-state team in New Jersey.

== Football career ==
In February 1971, after being recruited by 50 big-time colleges, he announced his commitment to play college football at Purdue University.

At Purdue, he played for the football team in 1973 and 1974. In 1973, he was the team's punter and backup quarterback. He led the Big Ten in punting during the 1973 season with an average of 38.3 yards per punt.

He became the team's No. 1 quarterback in 1974. Despite a shoulder injury that called his fitness into question, he led the 1974 Boilermakers to a 24-point first quarter in an upset victory over defending national champion Notre Dame at South Bend, Indiana. In total, Terrizzi appeared in 22 games for the Boilermakers, completing 32 of 72 passes for 526 yards.

In March 1975, Terrizzi signed a free agent contract with the San Francisco 49ers. He was cut by the 49ers in late July 1975.

== Legal career ==
He attended Golden Gate University School of Law and became an attorney with the law firm of Plastiras & Terrizzi located in San Rafael, California. He specialized in community/homeowner association law.

He is also a board member of the National Football Foundation and College Football Hall of Fame, Northern California Chapter.
