= Debra Peppers =

American radio and television talk show host

- Born: c. 1951 (age 74–75); Saint Louis, Missouri
- Occupations: Radio and Television talk show host, Speaker
- Website: http://www.pepperseed.org

Debra D. Peppers (born c. 1951) is an American educator, motivational speaker, television host on WTJR and radio co-host on KJSL/KYFI.

She was educated at the University of Alabama (1973, BA English/speech communication) and Webster University (1986, MA Education).

Peppers taught English language, theater production, and dramatic arts at a suburban St. Louis public school for many years.

In 1999, Peppers was one of five teachers inducted into the National Teachers Hall of Fame, and in 2006 was inducted into the Midwest Hall of Fame. She is on the adjunct faculty at Webster University where she was the 2000 Outstanding Alumna. A member of the National Speakers Association, Peppers has traveled to all 50 states and 55 foreign countries.

Peppers frequently co-hosts the weekly radio program Quest for Character with Mike Dunn on KYFI AM 630. The program airs live on Tuesday night at 8pm and is notable for having multi-talented guests and national personalities. Her television program, Outreach Connection, airs at 7:00 pm Tuesday evenings.

Peppers hosted the longest running live radio program on KJSL from 1996 through May 2006 titled "Talk from the Heart" a two-hour call-in interactive radio program with uplifting Christian topics. The program was produced by current KJSL Producer Pat Knox who was the lead producer for the program from July 2002 to May 2006. Pat now produces the God and Country theme as well as other station programming.

Peppers Television Program "Outreach Connection" produced and aired their 100th episode in January 2009 and their 200th episode in February 2011 on WTJR In Quincy, Illinois on affiliated Christian Television Network.
