= Marilyn Barrueta =

American teacher

Marilyn Barrueta

Marilyn Barrueta was inducted into the National Teachers Hall of Fame in 2005 after 48 years of teaching. Since 1978, "Señora Barrueta" has taught Spanish 1–6, advanced placement Spanish, and Spanish for Fluent Speakers at Yorktown High School in Arlington, Virginia in the United States.

== History ==
Before her career at Yorktown, Marilyn Barrueta taught Spanish 1–3, English, English as a Second Language, Math, and Social Studies at Stratford Junior High in Arlington, Virginia, from 1957 to 1978. During that time, from 1961 to 1972, she taught summer school sessions in Arlington, in addition to Spanish Adult Education for Arlington County Adult Education from 1958 to 1961.

She died on November 4, 2010.

== Honors ==
Other of Marilyn Barrueta's many honors include:

- 2000 Distinguished Educator, The Governor's School, Richmond, Virginia
- 1994-1997 Nationally elected to the Executive Council of the American Council on the Teaching of Foreign Languages
- 1987 Yorktown High School Recognition Award for Professional Involvement and Contributions to the Profession
- 1985 Yorktown Faculty Award for Work with Students
- 1984 Greater Washington Association of Teachers of Foreign Language Recognition Award for Service to the Profession
- 1983 Yorktown Faculty Award for Work with Students
- 1954-1957 Phi Beta Kappa
- 1954-1957 University of Illinois Mortar Board
- 1954-1957 Phi Kappa Phi
- 1954-1957 Alpha Lambda Delta
- 1954-1957 Scholarship Key
- 1954-1957 Class Honors upper 10%

== Academic background ==
- University of Virginia Graduate Work 2001, 2000, 1999, 1991, 1989, 1988, 1986, 1962, 1961
- George Mason University Graduate Work 1991, 1986, 1985, 1984, 1977
- William and Mary Graduate Work 1993
- Johns Hopkins School of Advanced International Studies Graduate Work 1996
- Catholic University Graduate Work 1984
- Trinity College Graduate Work 1977
- Georgetown University Graduate Work 1972
- American University Graduate Work 1967
- University of Illinois B.A. 1957
