= Hannah Pearl Davis =

American social media personality (born 1996)

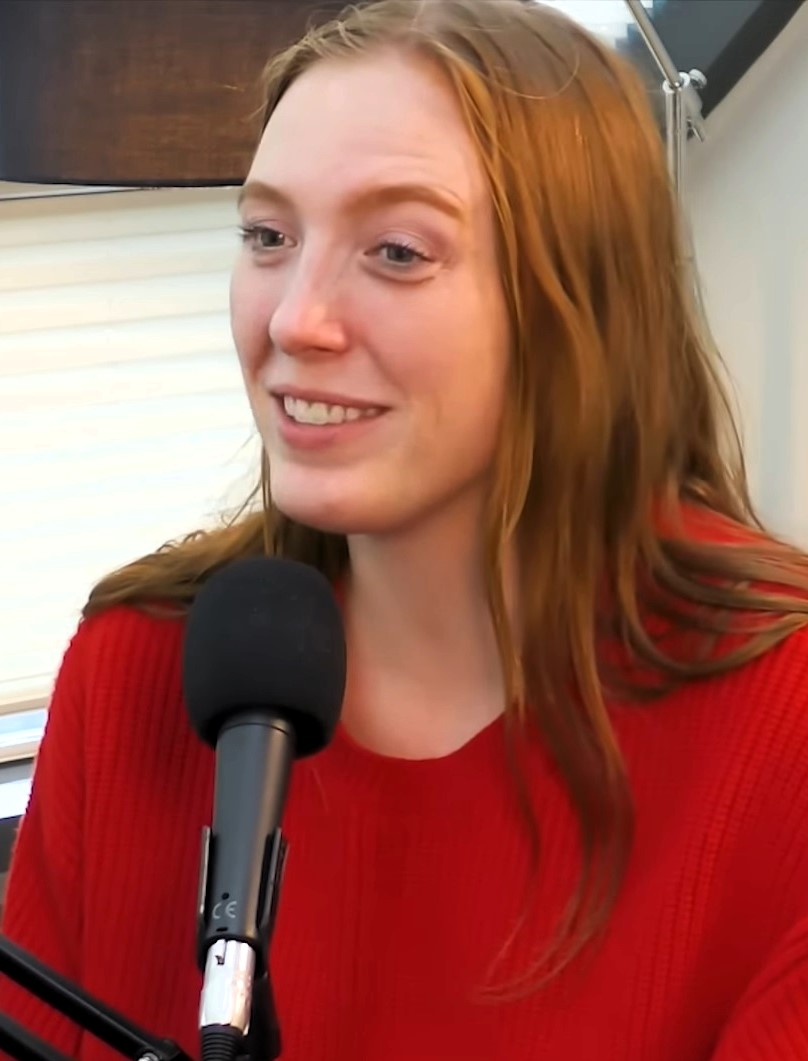
- Davis interviewed in 2022
- Born: Hannah Pearl Davis; 4 November 1996 (age 30); Chicago, Illinois, U.S.
- Education: Elmhurst University (BBA)
- Occupations: YouTuber, cultural, political commentator
- Movement: Antifeminism

YouTube information
- Channel: JustPearlyThings
- Genres: Politics, vlog
- Subscribers: 2.07 million
- Views: 325 million
- Last updated: Oct 16, 2026

Hannah Pearl Davis (born 1996 or 1997), better known online as JustPearlyThings or Pearl, is an American YouTuber and political commentator. Davis has been referred to as an antifeminist, known primarily for her cultural and political commentary relating to modern sex relations, dating, and marriage. She is an advocate of traditional dating and marital relations and a critic of modern dating and feminism. Davis argues that modern women have been deceived by a dysfunctional culture of sex and dating and that they should embrace traditional approaches to relationships to achieve happiness.

== Early life and education ==
Davis was raised Roman Catholic in Huntley, Illinois. She has nine siblings, three of whom were adopted. Davis's parents are software entrepreneurs and founders of Davisware, a business management software company. Her mother, Jennifer Davis, was on the US board of directors for UN Women and founded BExponential, a self-help organization for women. Davis attended Marian Central Catholic High School. She attended Ohio Northern University before later transferring to Elmhurst University. She played volleyball for the Elmhurst Bluejays.

== Career ==
Davis sold copy machines after graduating from college. She began producing content for social media in 2020. Shortly thereafter, she moved to London to become a professional volleyball player, and would interview her teammates to get their perspectives on social issues. In the process, she amassed over 900,000 followers on TikTok, especially due to the popularity of her series Breakup Quiz, on which she critically evaluated participants' former relationships. Her account was banned in 2022, with Davis alleging that she was banned for taking critical positions against feminism. Davis is now known primarily for her cultural and political commentary on her YouTube channel JustPearlyThings.

On her YouTube channel, Davis has conducted street interviews and interviewed prominent personalities in the manosphere online space. She also hosts "The Pre-Game Show" podcast. Davis regularly discusses issues relating to modern sexual relations between men and women.

Davis's online following has been classified as a "male supremacist" hate group by the Southern Poverty Law Center.

== Political views ==
Davis is a conservative, and has been described as an "anti-feminist". She advocates for traditional and conservative positions in relation to dating, sex, and marriage. Her perspectives have been influenced by the economist Thomas Sowell and the conservative political commentator Ben Shapiro.

Most of Davis's cultural and political commentary pertains to dating and sex relations between heterosexual men and women, but she sometimes takes positions on broader political issues and makes broader criticisms of female behavior and privilege, particularly in cases where she asserts that there are double-standards between men and women. On June 28, 2023, she stated that "the courts, the legal system, all of society is basically pandering and simping for women." In an interview with Ethan Klein on the H3 Podcast, she said that divorce "should be banned" and that "If feminists want the right to vote [...] then it should come with the draft."

In August 2025 Davis criticized right-wing influencer Sarah Stock for posting her engagement ring on social media which was seen by Davis as using marriage and family for personal brand building.

In November 2025 Davis had an online debate with pro-life activist Lila Rose in which she questioned Rose's negative views on porn. According to Davis porn use has contributed to the stability of marriages and Rose's position cannot reflect the opinions of men on the topic.

== See also ==
- List of Elmhurst University alumni
- List of YouTubers
