= Marian Central Catholic High School =

Location
- 1001 McHenry Avenue; Woodstock, Illinois; United States; 42°19′33″N 88°25′54″W

Information
- Type: Private, Coeducational, Diocesan
- Motto: Via Veritatis (The Way of Truth)
- Religious affiliation: Roman Catholic
- Established: 1959
- Head of school: Matt Schutte
- Teaching staff: 28
- Grades: 9-12
- Enrollment: 350 (2021-2022)
- Student to teacher ratio: 15
- Campus: Suburban
- Colors: Columbia Blue, White, Red
- Athletics conference: Chicagoland Christian Conference
- Nickname: Hurricanes
- Accreditation: North Central Association of Colleges and Schools
- Publication: The Muse (literary magazine)
- Newspaper: The Crown
- Yearbook: The Memoriam
- Website: www.marian.com

Marian Central Catholic High School is a private, Roman Catholic high school in Woodstock, Illinois, United States. It is located in the Roman Catholic Diocese of Rockford.

== Athletics ==
Marian has won the following state team championships: boys' wrestling (2023 Class 1A State Champions), girls volleyball (2015 Class 3A State Champions), girls cross country (1998 Class A State Champions), and football in the 1980s when the team won 4 State Championships.

=== Boys ===
- Fall: Cross Country, Football, Golf, Soccer
- Winter: Basketball, Wrestling
- Spring: Baseball, Tennis, Track & Field, Lacrosse, Bass Fishing

=== Girls ===
- Fall: Cross Country, Golf, Tennis, Volleyball, Dance Team, Cheerleading
- Winter: Basketball, Dance Team, Cheerleading
- Spring: Soccer, Softball, Track & Field

== Notable alumni ==
- Bryan Bulaga – former NFL offensive tackle, member of Super Bowl XLV champion Green Bay Packers
- Jen Lada – sportscaster for ESPN
- Chris Streveler – CFL and NFL quarterback
- Hannah Pearl Davis - Internet personality

== See also ==
- Schools in Illinois
