= Dorothy Sunrise Lorentino =

Native American teacher (1909-2005)

- Born: Dorothy Tabbyyetchy (Sunrise); May 7, 1909; Comanche Reservation, near Cache, Oklahoma
- Died: August 4, 2005 (aged 96); Fort Smith, Arkansas
- Other name: Dorothy Sunrise
- Citizenship: Comanche Nation and U.S.
- Occupation: teacher
- Years active: 1938–1975
- Known for: Dorothy Sunrise v. District Board of Cache Consolidated School District No. 1

Dorothy Sunrise Lorentino (May 7, 1909 – August 4, 2005) was a Comanche teacher from Oklahoma. As a child, she won a landmark education judgment against the Cache Consolidated School District of Comanche County, Oklahoma for Native American children to attend public schools rather than government-mandated Bureau of Indian Affairs Schools. It was a precursor case to both the Alice Piper v. Pine School District (1924) which allowed Native American children to attend school in California and Brown v. Board of Education (1954), which decided separate schooling based on race was unconstitutional. Language from her judgment was incorporated into the Indian Citizenship Act (1924). Having won the right to attend public school, she went on to earn credentials as a special education teacher and taught for over forty years. In 1997, she was the first Native American and the first Oklahoman to be inducted into the National Teachers Hall of Fame.

== Early life ==
Dorothy Tabbyyetchy (Sunrise) was born on May 7, 1909, on the Comanche Reservation to Esther (née Parker) and William Tabbyyetchy (Charlie Sunrise). On her maternal side, her grandparents were Ah-Uh-Wuth-Takum and Quanah Parker. Sunrise began her education at the Fort Sill Indian School and attended the Post Oak Mission Sunday School. In 1915 because of the distance required for his children to attend boarding schools, Tabbyyetchy enrolled his children in the Cache Public Schools near Lawton, Oklahoma. She was the only Native American child in the school and was only allowed to stay for a few days before the school expelled her indicating that she might bring disease to the other students. Her parents filed a lawsuit against the school and in 1918 won a judgment that ordered the school to admit Native American children.

Finally accepted into school, Sunrise had to learn English, as she spoke only Comanche and relied on her mother to help her learn English. As her mother died before 1920, her father raised her and her four siblings with help of relatives, including his mother, To-Che-Yah. Her sister Winona would also grow up to be an educator and her brother Morris Tabbyyetchy (Sunrise) would become one of the World War II Comanche code talkers. After finishing her primary education, Sunrise graduated from the Chilocco Indian Agricultural School in 1931, before pursuing higher education at Bacone College. In 1933, she earned an associate degree from Bacone and taught there for a year before transferring to Northeastern State Teachers College, where she earned her bachelor's degree in education. On October 19, 1936, Sunrise married William Wilson Lorentino.

== Career ==
Immediately after her degree was granted, Lorentino began working in 1938 at the Phoenix Indian School in Phoenix. She chose to teach students whose first language was not English and special education, teaching children with disabilities. After teaching for almost a decade on reservations in Arizona and New Mexico, such as at the Tohono O'odham Indian School near Tucson and the Tohatchi Boarding School on the Navajo Reservation, Lorentino moved to Oregon and enrolled in a master's degree program for special education from the University of Oregon. Earning her master's degree in 1947, Lorentino then taught in the Tillamook Educational System before transferring to the Santiam Central School of Albany, Oregon. Dorothy Sunrise Lorentino taught at Liberty School near Sweet Home, Oregon, for two years (1952–53; 1953–54). She later worked in the Salem, Oregon schools, teaching at Broadacres School and North Santiam School.

After thirty-four years of teaching, Lorentino retired in 1972 and the following year was honored by a service award from the Tillamook Education Association. She returned to Lawton, Oklahoma and continued teaching as a substitute teacher in the 1970s, as well as teaching the Comanche language and songs to tribal members. In 1995, Lorentino was honored by the National Indian Education Association as the elder of the year. The following year, the Dorothy Sunrise Lorentino Award was inaugurated by Cache High School as an annual award for the American Indian student who best exemplifies Lorentino's principals. In 1997, she became the first Native American and the first person from Oklahoma to be inducted into the National Teachers Hall of Fame.

== Death and legacy ==
Lorentino died on August 4, 2005, at her home in Fort Smith, Arkansas, and was buried at the Post Oak Cemetery in Indiahoma, Oklahoma. The judgment won in her name, Dorothy Sunrise v. District Board of Cache Consolidated School District No. 1 was a landmark case, overturning previous policy that native children had to attend schools provided by the Bureau of Indian Affairs and predating both Alice Piper v. Pine School District of 1924, which allowed Native American students in California to attend public school and Brown v. Board of Education of 1954, which decided separate schooling based on race was unconstitutional. In 1924, the language of her judgment was also incorporated into the Indian Citizenship Act, which guaranteed access to public schooling to all Native American children.
