= Edwin J. Vandenberg =

Chemist (1918–2005)

Edwin J. Vandenberg (September 13, 1918 – June 11, 2005) was a chemist at Hercules Inc. and a researcher at Arizona State University.

Vandenberg is best known for his work at Hercules in the 1950s through the 1970s that included the independent discovery of isotactic polypropylene, the development of Ziegler-type catalysts and epoxide polymerization.

The Vandenberg catalyst is named after him. This catalyst is an aluminoxane, prepared from an alkyl-aluminium and water, used as a catalyst in the manufacture of polyether elastomers.

== Early life and education ==
Vandenberg was raised in Hawthorne, New Jersey. His father owned a grain and feed store. He graduated in 1935 as part of the first graduating class at Hawthorne High School. He attended the Stevens Institute of Technology, earning an ME degree in 1939 and a D Eng degree in 1965.

== Awards ==
- ACS Award in Polymer Chemistry (1981)
- ACS Award in Applied Polymer Science (1991)
- ACS ACS Rubber Division's Charles Goodyear Medal (1991)
- ACS Polymer Division's Herman F. Mark Award (1992)
- Society of Plastics Engineers International Award (1994).
- Priestley Medal (2003)
