= Bryan Bulaga =

American football player (born 1989)

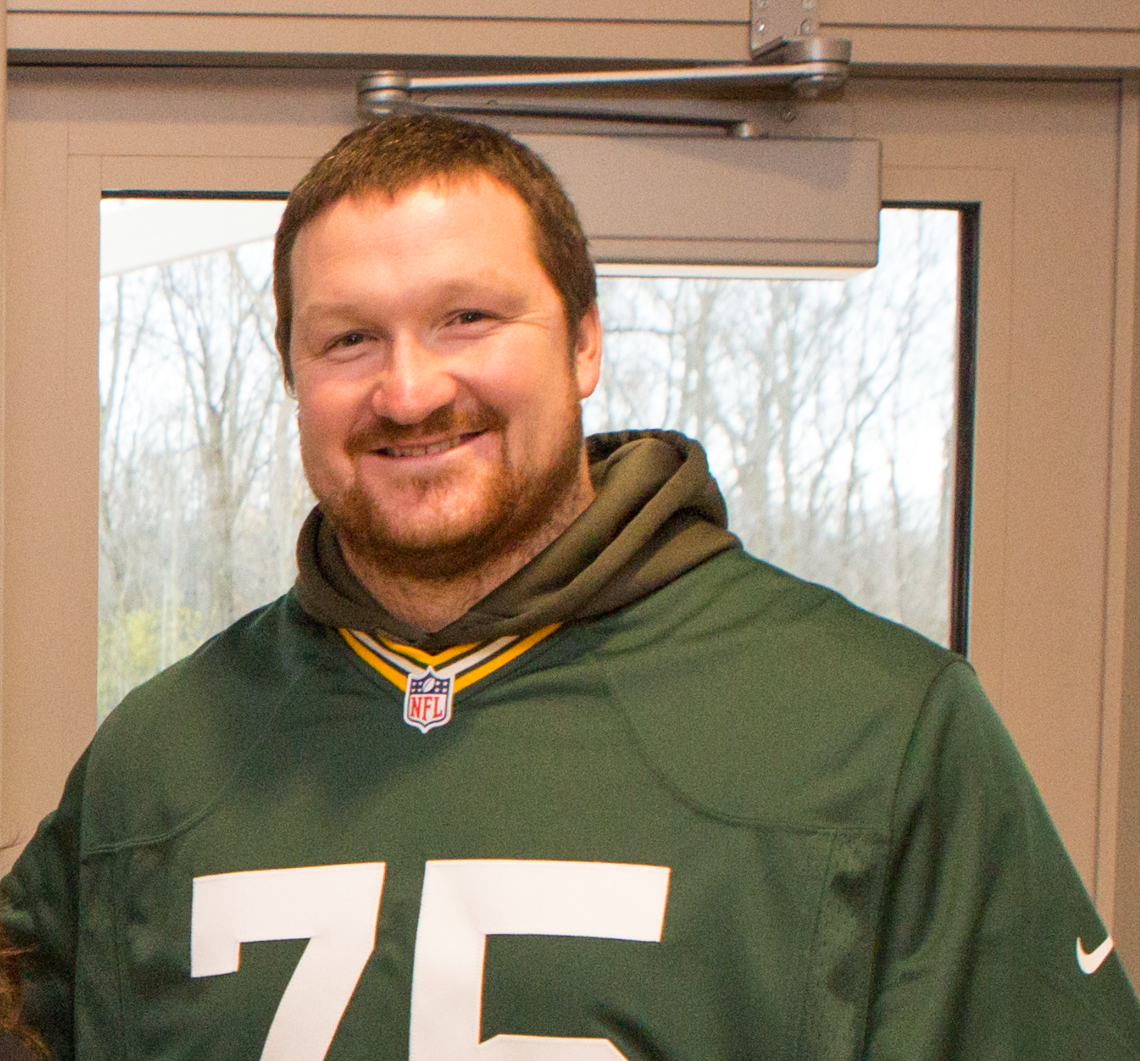
- Bulaga with the Green Bay Packers in 2016

No. 75
- Position: Offensive tackle

Personal information
- Born: March 21, 1989 (age 37); Barrington, Illinois, U.S.
- Listed height: 6 ft 5 in (1.96 m)
- Listed weight: 314 lb (142 kg)

Career information
- High school: Marian Central Catholic (Woodstock, Illinois)
- College: Iowa (2007–2009)
- NFL draft: 2010: 1st round, 23rd overall pick

Career history
- Green Bay Packers (2010–2019); Los Angeles Chargers (2020–2021)

Awards and highlights
- Super Bowl champion (XLV); PFWA All-Rookie Team (2010); First-team All-American (2009); Big Ten Offensive Lineman of the Year (2009); First-team All-Big Ten (2009); Second-team All-Big Ten (2008)

Career NFL statistics
- Games played: 126
- Games started: 122
- Stats at Pro Football Reference

Bryan Joseph Bulaga (/buˈlɑːɡə/ boo-LAH-gə; born March 21, 1989) is an American former professional football player who was an offensive tackle in the National Football League (NFL). He played college football for the Iowa Hawkeyes, and was selected by the Green Bay Packers in the first round of the 2010 NFL draft, winning Super Bowl XLV that season. He also played for the Los Angeles Chargers.

== Early life ==
His parents are of Polish descent. Bulaga has one small Polish word tattooed on each arm (siła "strength", and pycha "pride"). He was raised Catholic. Bulaga grew up in Crystal Lake, Illinois, where he played peewee football for the Crystal Lake Raiders Youth Football program. He attended Marian Central Catholic High School in Woodstock, Illinois, where he played offensive tackle and tight end but also at defensive end occasionally, and even at linebacker for the Marian Central Catholic Canes high school football team. He recorded 261 career tackles with 46 tackles for losses, 31 sacks, and one interception, while as a tight end, he had 35 pass receptions for a total of 665 yards, and scored 10 touchdowns. Bulaga and his teammates at the Marian Central High School, coached by Ed Brucker, were undefeated during their regular season in nine games, and they took second place in the state playoffs, losing in the championship to the Springfield Sacred Heart Griffin High School.

Bulaga was considered a four-star college recruit by the service Rivals.com, and he ranked sixth among the college prospects for offensive tackle. He had numerous offers for to play football on athletic scholarships, including ones from the University of Nebraska–Lincoln, Oklahoma State University, and the University of Wisconsin, with a number of other schools recruiting him as either a defensive lineman or a tight end. Bulaga chose to attend the University of Iowa, whose football coaches promised him that he could play in the offensive line.

== College career ==
Bulaga played left guard in his true freshman year in 2007, and was a starter by mid-season. He was named to Sporting News' Freshman All-Big Ten team. In 2008, he made the move to left tackle, and he started every game at that position for the Hawkeyes. He earned a second-team All-Big Ten selection by the coaches and a second-team Sophomore All-American selection by College Football News.

In 2009, Bulaga was listed at number three on Rivals.com's preseason offensive tackle power ranking. He was also named to the 2009 Outland Trophy watch list.

After missing three games with a thyroid disease, Bulaga started all of the remaining games for the Hawkeyes, including their 24–14 win over the Georgia Tech Yellow Jackets in the 2010 Orange Bowl. He was named the Big Ten's offensive lineman of the year for 2009.

== Professional career ==
=== Pre-draft ===
On January 6, 2010, Bulaga released a statement about his intentions to forgo his final season of college and enter the 2010 NFL draft.

Pre-draft measurables
Height	Weight	Arm length	Hand span	40-yard dash	10-yard split	20-yard split	20-yard shuttle	Three-cone drill	Vertical jump	Broad jump	Bench press	Wonderlic
6 ft 5 3/8 in (1.97 m)	314 lb (142 kg)	33 1/4 in (0.84 m)	9 1/4 in (0.23 m)	5.22 s	1.80 s	3.03 s	4.75 s	7.70 s	27 1/2 in (0.70 m)	8 ft 2 in (2.49 m)	26 reps	20
All values from NFL Combine

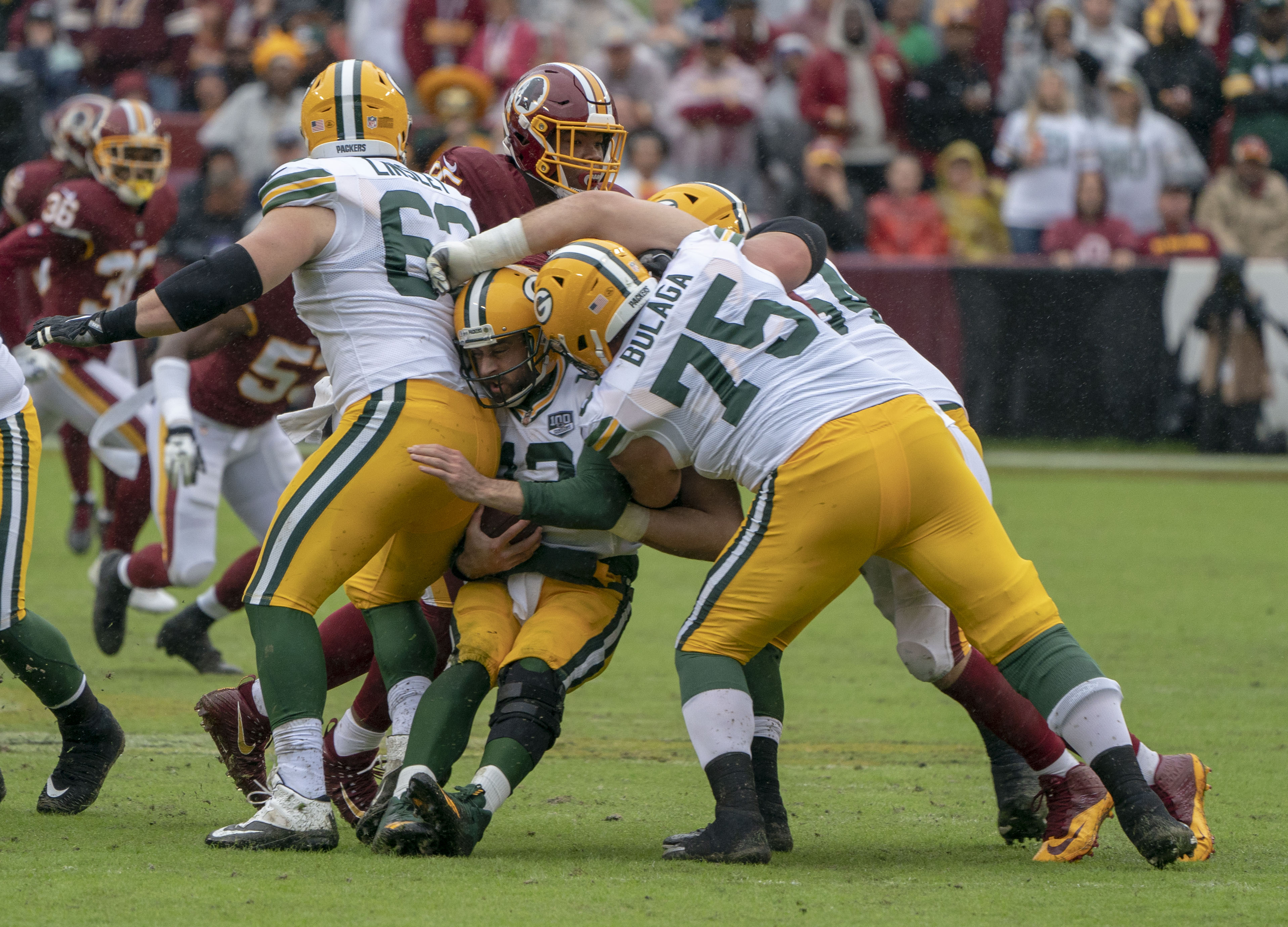
Bulaga in a game against the Washington Redskins in 2018

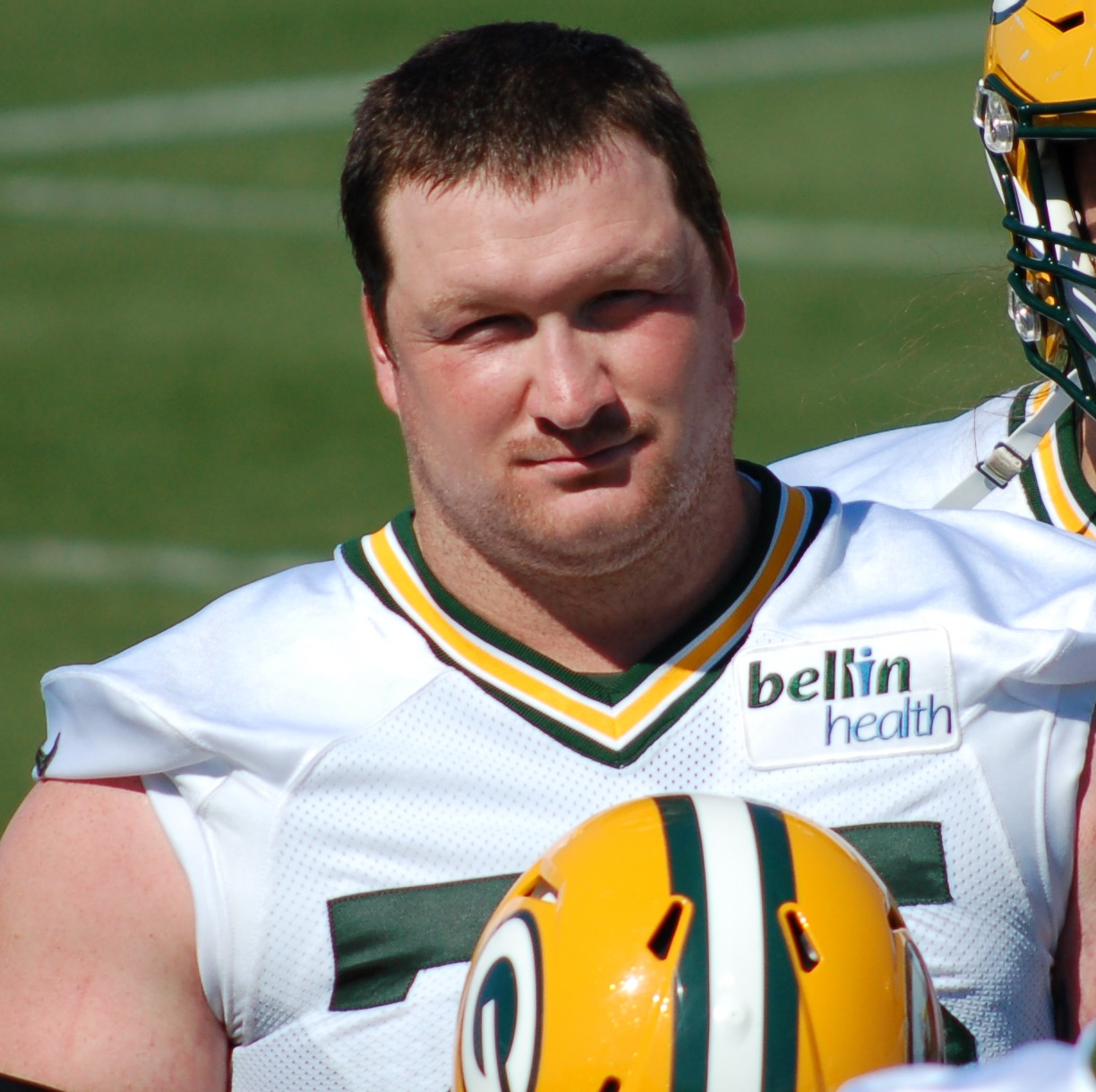
Bulaga with the Packers in 2015

=== Green Bay Packers ===
Bulaga was selected in the first round (23rd overall) by the Green Bay Packers in the 2010 NFL draft. He began the 2010 season as a back-up offensive lineman before getting his first start in the fifth week against the Washington Redskins. He went to start every game for the rest of the season, eventually being named to the NFL All-Rookie team. At 21 years, 322 days, Bulaga became the youngest player to start in a Super Bowl. Bulaga and the Packers defeated the Pittsburgh Steelers by a score of 31–25 in the Super Bowl.

During the 2012 NFL season, Bulaga injured his hip and in November was placed on season-ending injured reserve. The Packers decided to shift him over to the left tackle slot for the 2013 NFL season.

Bulaga suffered a torn anterior cruciate ligament (ACL) during training camp workouts on August 4, 2013. He missed the entire 2013 season.

In 2014, Bulaga had one of his finest seasons. Despite suffering an injury in week 1 to the Seattle Seahawks, he started and played in 15 of 16 games. Bulaga was instrumental in the offensive line giving up its fewest sacks (30) since the 2007 season and helped propel Eddie Lacy toward his second consecutive 1,000-yard rushing season.

On March 10, 2015, Bulaga and the Packers agreed to a 5-year deal, worth just under $7 million per year. On November 29, 2015, Bulaga was sidelined with an ankle sprain. He was later declared inactive for Week 13 against the Detroit Lions.

During Monday Night Football against the Lions in Week 9, November 6, 2017, Bulaga was carted off the field with a left knee injury. The next day, it was revealed that his left knee was diagnosed with a torn ACL, putting Bulaga out for the rest of the 2017 season. He was placed on injured reserve on November 18, 2017.

=== Los Angeles Chargers ===
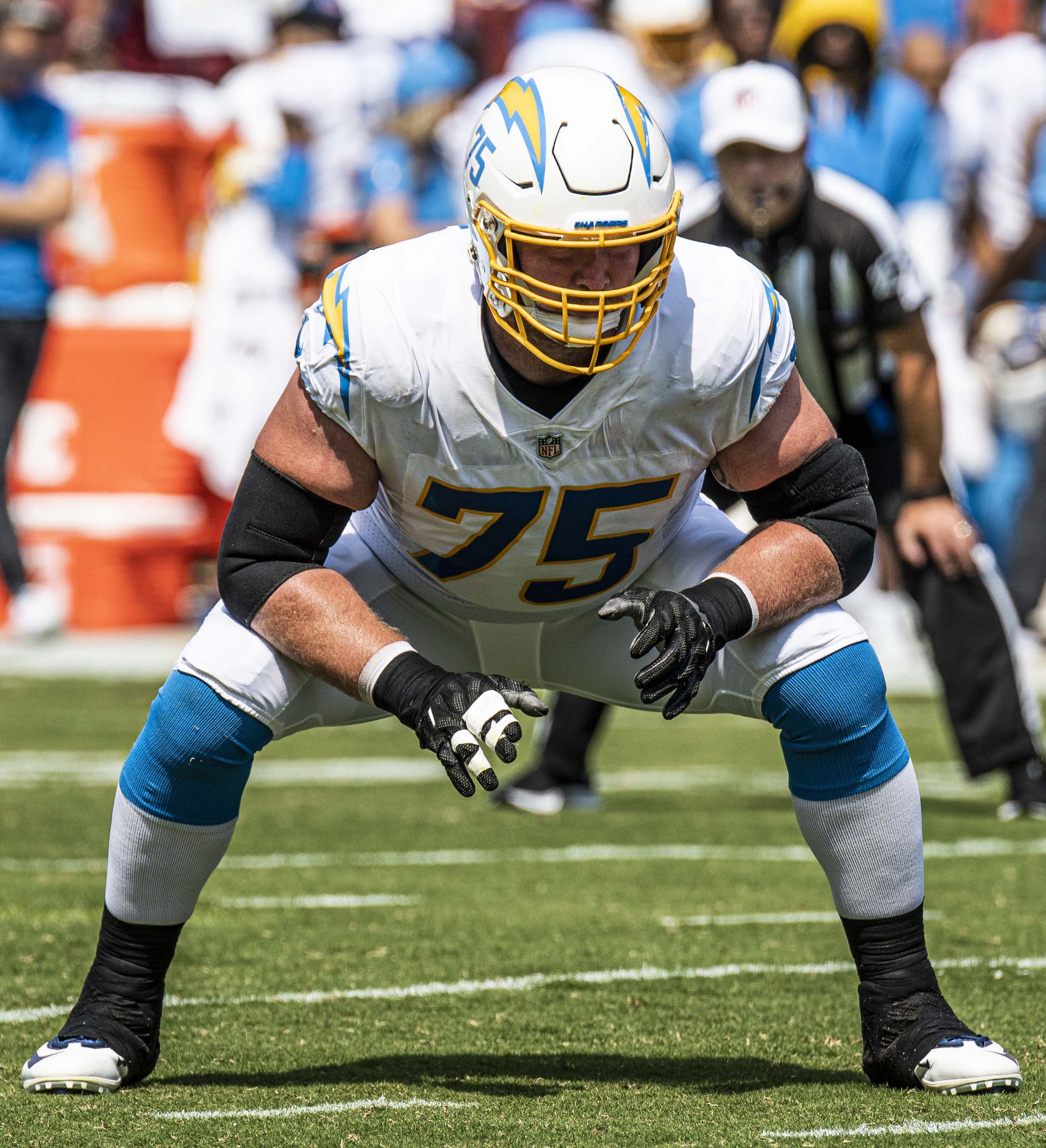
Bulaga with Los Angeles Chargers in 2021

On March 30, 2020, Bulaga signed a three-year, $30 million contract with the Los Angeles Chargers. He started 10 games in 2020, missing six games with a back injury.

On September 17, 2021, Bulaga was placed on injured reserve with back and groin injuries.

On March 15, 2022, Bulaga was released by the Chargers.

On November 17, 2023, Bulaga retired from professional football.
