= Russ Meneve =

American stand-up comedian

- Born: Hawthorne, New Jersey, U.S.
- Occupation: Stand-up comedian

Russ Meneve is an American stand-up comedian from Hawthorne, New Jersey who has appeared on multiple shows on NBC and Comedy Central.

== Early life ==
Russ Meneve was born in Hawthorne, New Jersey. He first began doing comedy at 17 while a student at Hawthorne High School. In 1993, he did his first professional stand up comedy routine. After school, he received a degree in accounting and worked as an accountant for Price Waterhouse. After quitting the job, he worked for Toys "R" Us and as a door-to-door salesman for telephone services. At the same time, he applied for the job of a page at NBC. Meneve became successful as a salesman and joined his former boss at a new company with a much higher salary but when NBC offered him a part-time job with a much lower salary, he quit as a salesman and worked for NBC as a page.

== Career ==
After joining NBC as a page, Meneve tried out as a comedian in various clubs in New York City and succeeded in getting stage time at major venues like the "Comedy Cellar", the "Comic Strip" and "Caroline's". By 2004, he was a regular performer at those venues. In 2005, he both appeared as himself and as a writer on Comedy Central Presents as well as on The Tonight Show with Jay Leno. He appeared on Late Night with Conan O'Brien, Last Call with Carson Daly, Last Comic Standing and The Caroline Rhea Show. He was on "The Ten Funniest New Yorkers You’ve Never Heard Of" list published by New York and was awarded "The Impact Player of 2005".

In 2004, he collaborated with Ted Alexandro and Tom Shillue to found the "New York Comedians Coalition" with over 300 other New York based comedians as their members in order to represent the comedians of the city and to negotiate better payment for comedians performing in the clubs. After several meetings with the club owners, the Coalition managed to negotiate a raise for all comics in the city.

== Releases ==
- Stray Doggie Style (2006)
