= John W. Rea House =

Historic house in New Jersey, United States

- U.S. National Register of Historic Places
- New Jersey Register of Historic Places
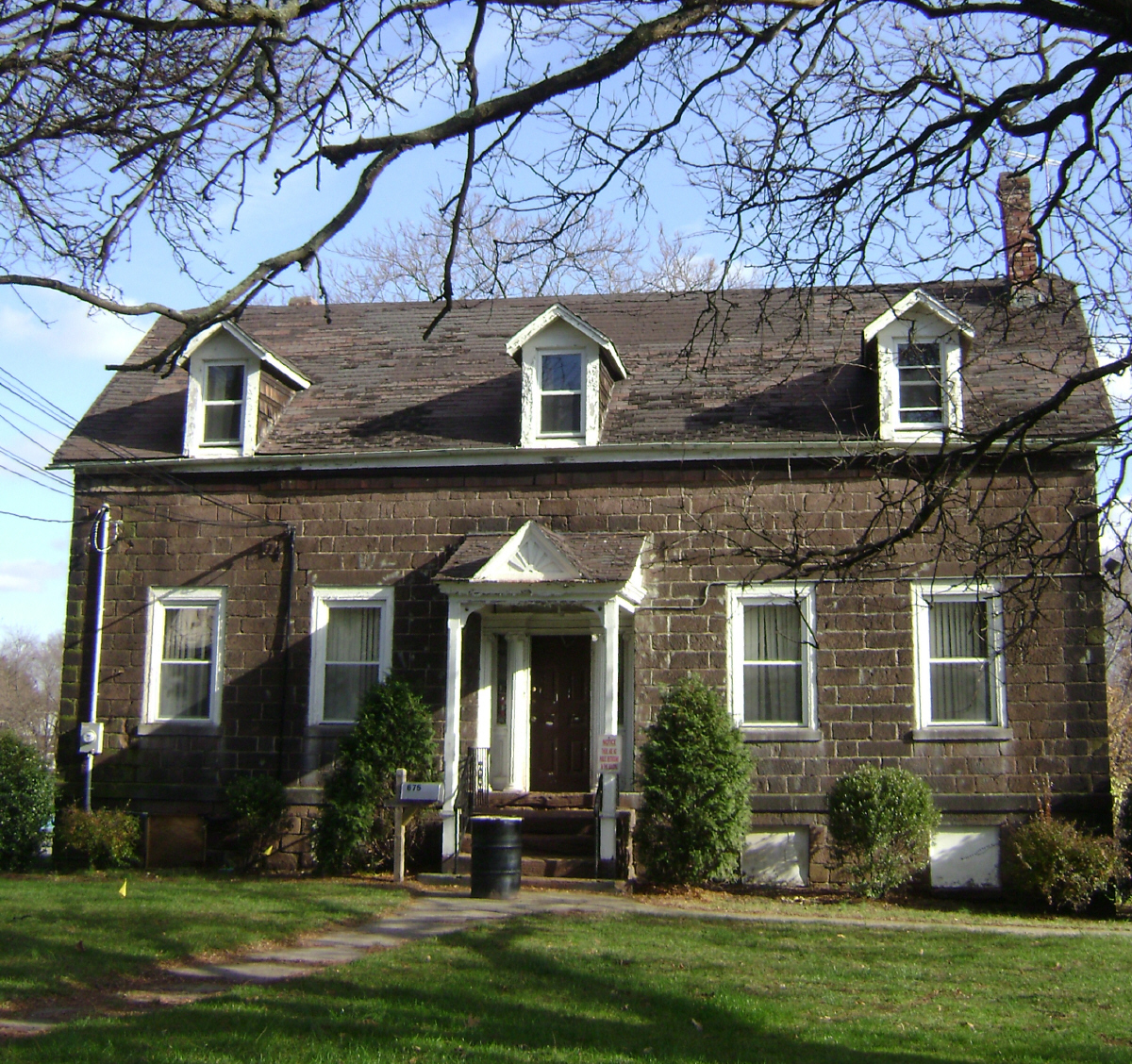
- John W. Rea House, seen from the front in early December, 2011.

- Location within Passaic County, New Jersey Location within New Jersey Location within the United States
- Location: 675 Goffle Road, Hawthorne, New Jersey
- Coordinates: 40°57′26″N 74°9′43″W
- Area: 3 acres (1.2 ha)
- Built: 1810
- Architectural style: Colonial
- NRHP reference No.: 99001168
- NJRHP No.: 183

Significant dates
- Added to NRHP: September 17, 1999
- Designated NJRHP: July 28, 1999

The John W. Rea House is located in Hawthorne, Passaic County, New Jersey, United States. The house was built in 1810 and was added to the National Register of Historic Places on September 17, 1999.

== See also ==
- National Register of Historic Places listings in Passaic County, New Jersey
