= Warren G. Phillips =

American science teacher

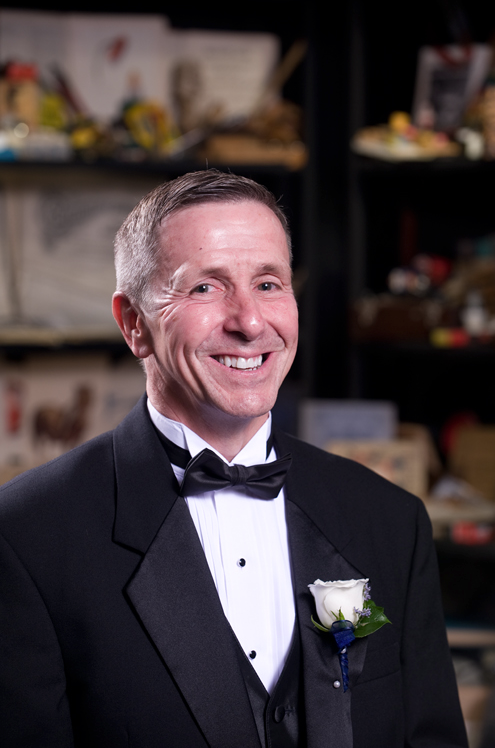
- Phillips in 2010
- Born: 1954 (age 71–72); Weymouth, Massachusetts
- Occupation: Science teacher
- Known for: National Teachers Hall of Fame
- Spouse: Karen Phillips

Warren G. Phillips (born 1954) is an American science teacher who was inducted into the National Teachers Hall of Fame in 2010.

== Career ==
Phillips obtained a B.A. in Earth Sciences, an M.A.T. in Teaching Physical Sciences, and an M.ED. in Instructional Technology from Bridgewater State University.

Phillips taught science for the Plymouth Public Schools in Plymouth, Massachusetts from 1975 to 2010, and for Silver Lake Schools in Kingston, Massachusetts from 2011 to 2016. As a middle school science teacher, he organized a three-day outdoor education trip for all Plymouth seventh graders for 25 years. He helped obtain grants to establish and maintain a TV studio within the school. His classes initiated and organized a recycling program for Plymouth Schools. He was a contributing writer for the Prentice-Hall Science Explorer series and has written curriculum for Northeastern University's Project SEED and the Plymouth Public Schools science curriculum. He is a board certified teacher by the National Board for Professional Teaching Standards (NBPTS). In 2008, he received an Earthwatch fellowship to study elephant behavior at Tsavo East National Park in Kenya.

Since 2005, Phillips has traveled around the U.S. doing keynote speeches and teacher professional development for Developing Minds, Inc., Bridgewater State University, Blue Ribbon Schools of Excellence, and local school districts. He is past president of the nonprofit STEP Foundation, which has funded an observatory, established teaching awards, and supported students and teachers in science endeavors. Since March 2019, Phillips has been an outreach coordinator for the Pegasus Springs Education Collective, a nonprofit dedicated to improving education.

Phillips is co-author with Marcia Tate of the teaching strategies book Science Worksheets Don't Grow Dendrites. Phillips is also the author of the teaching guidebook Oh, The Lives You'll Change! A Teacher's Story. He conducts brain-based STEM professional development for teachers.

== Awards ==
- 2002 Time Magazine Chevy Malibu Teaching Excellence Award (grand prize winner)
- 2001, 2002, 2003 Presidential Award for Excellence in Teaching Math and Science (Massachusetts finalist)
- 2004 Disney Middle School Teacher of The Year
- 2006 USA Today All-USA Teaching Team
- 2007 Massachusetts Science Teachers Hall Of Fame
- 2010 PBS Teachers Innovation Award
- 2010 Inducted into the National Teachers Hall of Fame
- 2013 Bridgewater State University Nicholas P. Tillinghast Award for Achievement in the Field Of Education

== Personal life ==
Phillips is the son of Joseph E. and Eleanore M. Phillips. He is married to Karen (née Friberg) and has two children, Jeff and Kristin.

Phillips was a guest on The Tony Danza Show (2004 talk show), after winning his Disney Middle School Teacher of The Year Award that same year. Phillips also appeared as a contestant on Who Wants to Be a Millionaire in 2005.

== Publications ==
- Oh, The Lives You'll Change! A Teacher's Story. Sing Along Science Publisher, Warren G. Phillips (2020) ISBN 978-0-578-73251-0
- 100 Brain-Friendly Lessons For Unforgettable Teaching and Learning K-8. Corwin Press, Marcia L. Tate, Lisa Lee, Simone Willingham, Deborah Daniel, and Warren G. Phillips (2020) ISBN 978-1-5443-8157-2
- 100 Brain-Friendly Lessons For Unforgettable Teaching and Learning 9-12. Corwin Press, Marcia L. Tate, Lisa Lee, Victoria Hanabury, Deborah Daniel, and Warren G. Phillips (2020) ISBN 978-1-5443-8156-5
- Science Worksheets Don't Grow Dendrites 20 Instructional Strategies That Engage The Brain. Corwin Press, Marcia L. Tate & Warren G. Phillips (2011) ISBN 978-1-4129-7847-7
- Today I Made A Difference. Adams Media, Joseph W. Underwood, editor (2009) ISBN 978-1-59869-834-3
- Exemplary Science In Grades 5-8, Standards-based Success Stories. NSTA Press, Robert E Yeager, editor (2006) ISBN 0-87355-262-8
- Science Explorer Cells And Heredity. Prentice-Hall, Donald Cronkite, Ph.D. (2002) ISBN 0-13-054064-1
- Sing-A-Long Science. 3 CDs of Science Songs (Original, The Sequel, The Second Sequel), Disc Makers (1999, 2001, 2002)
- The Science Secret A science Glee-like musical using Sing-A-Long Science songs. Independent publishers (2011)
