= Alpha Lambda Delta =

American collegiate honor society

- ΑΛΔ
- Founded: 31 May 1924; 102 years ago University of Illinois
- Type: Honor
- Affiliation: ACHS
- Status: Active
- Emphasis: First year success
- Scope: International
- Pillars: Academics, Scholarships, Service, Career Development, Belonging
- Colors: Maroon and Gold
- Symbol: Candle
- Publication: The Flame
- Chapters: 415
- Members: 1,400,000 lifetime
- Headquarters: 144 Fairport Village Landing #336; Fairport, New York 14450; United States
- Website: www.nationalald.org

Alpha Lambda Delta (ΑΛΔ) is an honor society for students who have achieved academic excellence their first year or term of higher education. Most chapters of ALD require at least a 3.5 GPA though some require a higher GPA or set a percentage bracket; i.e. top 20% of students.

== History ==
Alpha Lambda Delta was founded in 1924 by the Dean of Women, Maria Leonard, at the University of Illinois to recognize academic excellence among freshmen women. One year before, Dean Thomas Arkle Clark had founded Phi Eta Sigma, an honor society to recognize academic excellence among freshmen males. Both groups operated as single sex organizations until the mid-70s when they both became coeducational in response to Title IX.

At the first meeting of the chapter, Florence Finn, president of the society, presented a passage from Plato's Republic in which Socrates asks the question, “Will they hold torches and pass them to one another...?”. This idea, together with the symbol of a candle and the concept of sharing the love of learning with others, caught the imagination of the charter members.

The honor society soon became a national organization through the chartering of chapters at Purdue University in 1926, at DePauw University in 1927, at the University of Michigan in 1927, and at the University of Oklahoma in 1929.

The first national convention was held in 1930 on the campus of the University of Illinois. Conventions were suspended during the Depression years because of travel expenses. The third convention was held in 1938 at the University of Michigan. A decision was made at that convention to suspend holding a national convention and to invest those funds into establishing a graduate fellowship fund. The first fellowship was awarded to Louise Houssiere for graduate study at MIT in 1940.

The Association of College Honor Societies was organized in 1925 to consider matters of mutual concern to member organizations; Alpha Lambda Delta has been active in the Association since its admission to membership in 1939. In 1976 in response to Title IX, the National Council voted for the Society to become coeducational. In 1981, the first two male members of the National Council were installed.

Alpha Lambda Delta has continued to recognize academic excellence by providing Senior Certificates and the Maria Leonard Senior Book Award since 1939, offering workshops since 1978, recognizing outstanding chapters with the Order of the Torch Award since 1989, recognizing an Outstanding Adviser of the Year since 1990, and taking advantage of technology by posting a national web site in January 1997.

The Society has over 1.3 million lifetime members. ALD initiates between 25,000 and 30,000 new members each year.

== Symbols ==
The society's colors are maroon and gold. Members are entitled to wear Alpha Lambda Delta honor cords at their graduation exercises.

Its symbol is the candle. Its annual publication is The Flame. The Alpha Lambda Delta pillars are Academics, Scholarships, Service, Career Development, and Belonging.

== Activities ==
Each year, National Alpha Lambda Delta awards over $211,000 in scholarships and fellowships to members. Undergraduate members may also be awarded the Jo Anne Trow Scholarship; 50 scholarships are given annually. The James G. Stemler Scholarship was designed for members who wish to study abroad, and 20 scholarships are awarded each year. Twenty eight graduate fellowships are awarded annually to members pursuing graduate education.

Students in each chapter who have succeeded in maintaining the highest GPA from among their school's membership may be awarded the Maria Leonard Senior Book Award, the presentation of a book with an inscribed bookplate.

== Chapters ==
Alpha Lambda Delta has chapters at 410 campuses in the United States.

== Membership ==
Members are invited to join by the local chapters, after the chapter has determined that the student has achieved a 3.5 or higher GPA in their first year or term of enrollment in an institution of higher education and/or be in the top twenty percent of his or her class. Members of the local chapters are also considered to be members of the National organization.

== Governance ==
The National organization is governed by a Board of Directors. The policies adopted by the Board of Directors, and annually by the chapters, are administered by ALD Headquarters. Headquarters is located in Fairport, New York. All administrative details of operating the Society are carried out through ALD Headquarters.

== Notable members ==
- Marilyn Barrueta, University of Illinois, teacher
- Lela E. Buis, Florida State University, writer
- Rashi Bunny, University of Alabama, actress
- Lily Collins, University of Southern California, actress
- Allison Kreiger, University of Florida, motivational speaker
- Cheslie Kryst, University of South Carolina, Miss USA 2019
- Roberta Naas, Rider University, journalist
- Annette Shelby, Alabama College, academic
