= Brad Williams (comedian) =

American comedian (born 1984)

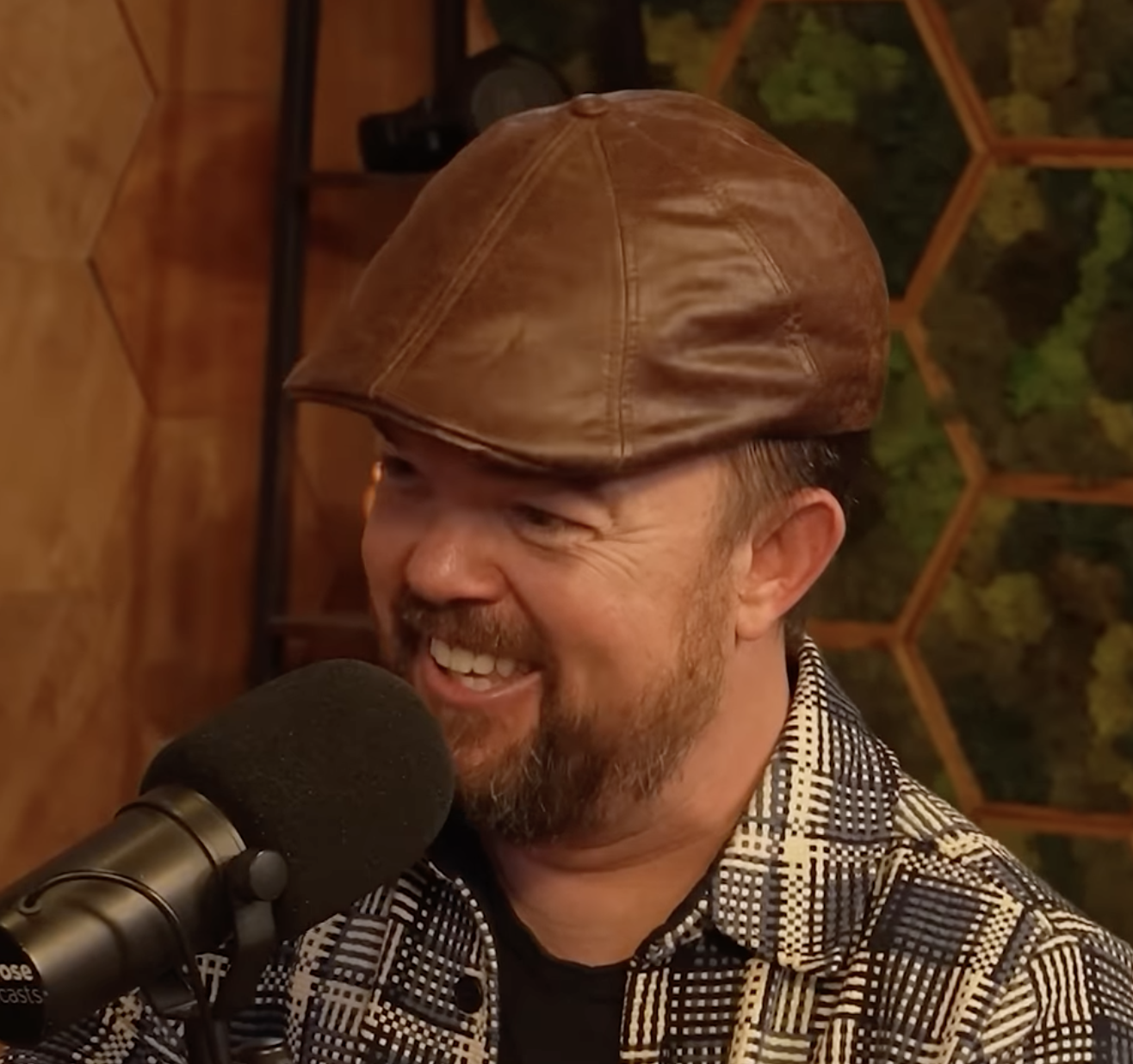
- Williams in 2026
- Born: January 13, 1984 (age 42); Orange, California, U.S.
- Education: University of Southern California
- Occupations: Stand-up comedian; actor
- Spouse: Jasmine Williams (m. 2017)
- Children: 1

Comedy career
- Years active: 2003–present
- Genre: Observational comedy
- Subjects: Everyday life; sex; identity politics; current events; pop culture
- Website: bradwilliamscomedy.com

Bradley Morgan Williams (born January 13, 1984) is an American stand-up comedian and actor. He has appeared in numerous films and television shows. He was born with achondroplasia, a form of dwarfism.

== Early life ==
Williams was born with achondroplasia. His condition plays a large part in both his stand-up comedy and his television roles. He attended Sunny Hills High School in Fullerton, California, and the University of Southern California. He withdrew from the university to pursue his acting and comedy career.

== Comedy career ==
Williams got his start at age 19 by attending a Carlos Mencia live comedy show. While he was in the crowd, Mencia made jokes about dwarves. The people sitting close to Williams were afraid to laugh and appear insensitive. Mencia noticed this, then noticed Williams and asked him to join him on stage. Williams cracked a few jokes and impressed Mencia. Mencia then asked Williams to try stand-up and be his opening act on the road. Williams has been Mencia's opening act for multiple tours, opening up shows on both the Mind of Mencia tour and the popular Punisher Tour.

In 2022, Williams was hired as the lead comic of the Las Vegas Cirque du Soleil show Mad Apple.

== Television appearances ==
Williams appeared on Mind of Mencia, playing several roles, including playing a dwarf whore ("whorf"), the leader of an all dwarf basketball team, joining Mencia at a Renaissance faire, and giving a speech about his hatred of podiums. For St. Patrick's Day 2008, Brad, dressed as a leprechaun, made an appearance on The Tonight Show with Jay Leno. For Halloween 2008, Brad dressed up as Child's Play character Chucky for a skit on Jimmy Kimmel Live!. On SummerSlam 2026, he appeared as one of the "Minihausens", allies of Danhausen.

== Stand-up releases ==
In April 2011, Williams released his first full-length comedy album called Coming Up Short.

On April 14, 2014, Williams started hosting the About Last Night podcast with comedian/actor Adam Ray.

Williams had his first one-hour comedy special, Brad Williams: Fun Size, on May 8, 2015, on Showtime. His second one-hour comedy special, Brad Williams: Daddy Issues, aired on May 20, 2016, on Showtime.

Williams was a frequent guest and "friend of the show" to The Kevin and Bean Show, broadcast weekday mornings on KROQ 106.7FM, Los Angeles, California. He appeared on Kevin and Bean's "April Foolishness" comedy show in 2012, 2013 and 2015 alongside such comedians as Bob Saget, Jay Mohr, Jim Jeffries, Bill Burr, and Eddie Izzard.

== Personal life ==
Williams has been confused with Jason "Wee Man" Acuña from Jackass because of their similar appearance.

Williams has also been confused with professional wrestler Dylan "Hornswoggle" Postl.

In 2014, Williams made comments on the podcast Getting Doug with High during which he admitted to and described committing rape by deception. The episode was subsequently taken down, although clips of the episode reappeared on YouTube in 2019, prompting social media discussion about consent and widespread criticism of Williams’ actions. On January 14, 2020, Williams tweeted an apology on Twitter where he stated that the story was fabricated and intended as a joke.

In 2017, Williams married taekwondo instructor Jasmine Gong. In January 2020, the couple had a daughter, who also is an achondroplastic dwarf.

Williams is a fan of the Denver Broncos and Anaheim Ducks.

== Discography ==
Year	Title	Notes
2011	Coming Up Short	Debut full-length album
2013	Hi Ho	
2015	Fun Size	Also comedy special
2016	Daddy Issues	Also comedy special
2023	Starfish	Also comedy Special
2026	Live On Short Street	Comedy Special

== Filmography ==
=== Television ===
Year	Title	Role	Notes
2003	The Restaurant	Himself	1 episode
2005–07	Mind of Mencia	Various roles	21 episodes
2008	Live at Gotham	Himself	June 13, 2008
2008	The Tonight Show with Jay Leno	Leprechaun	March 17, 2008
2009	Jimmy Kimmel Live!	New Jersey Net / Mini Cowboy	December 4, 2009 / April 14, 2009
2010–12	Pit Boss	Himself	12 episodes
2011	Video Game Reunion	Little Nemo	April 12, 2011
2012	A Guy Walks Into a Bar	Jason	Episode: "Magic Apples"
2012	The Naughty Show	Himself	January 17, 2012 / February 7, 2012
2012–15	The Playboy Morning Show	Himself	7 episodes
2012–17	Laugh Factory	Himself	Episodes: "Brad Williams: Sex Video Game" / "My Urinal"
2013–14	Legit	Himself	3 episodes: "Bag Lady", "Intervention", "Sober"
2013	Making Yogurt with Brady Matthews	Himself	
2013	Dom Irrera Live	Himself	
2013	Sam & Cat	Hector	Episode: "#MotorcycleMystery"
2014	Legit	Brad	Episode: "Honesty"
2014	Comedy Underground with Dave Attell	Himself	April 19, 2014
2015	Kamikaze Comedy	Himself	Episode: "The One Where the Guys Comedy Bomb the Hood"
2015	Fun Size	Himself	Debut comedy special
2015	Absolutely Jason Stuart	Himself	Episodes: "Brad Williams" / "Brad Williams II"
2015	Why? With Hannibal Buress	Himself	Episode: "Get the F Out of Here"
2015	2015 AVN Awards	1st Comedy Segment Actor	TV special
2015–16	Deadbeat	Tyson	7 episodes
2016	Court Ordered	Corbin	TV series short / Episode: "Pilot"
2016	Daddy Issues	Himself	Comedy special
2017	Return of the Mac	Steve	Episode: "Celebrity Tantrum"
2017	What's Your F@#King Deal?!	Himself	Episode: "Brad Williams, Nick Vatterott and Godfrey"
2017	The Nasty Show Volume II Hosted by Brad Williams	Himself	TV movie / Host
2018	This Is Not Happening	Himself	Episode: "Famous" / Writer (1 episode)
2018	The Degenerates	Himself	Netflix series; Episode: "Brad Williams"
2018–19	Laff Mobb's Laff Tracks	Himself	2 episodes
2020	Robot Chicken	Harry Lime / Teenage Boy	Voice role; Episode: "Buster Olive in: The Monkey Got Closer Overnight"
2024	Starfish	Himself	Comedy special
2025	Funny You Should Ask	Himself	Game show
2026	Live On Short Street	Himself	Comedy Special

=== Film ===
Year	Title	Role	Notes
2003	El matador	Little Actor #5	
2006	Life is Short	Gary	Short film
2010	Rageous	Himself	TV movie
2011	Team Apparition	Little Person Ghost	
2011	Geezas	Little Carlos	
2011	Balls to the Wall	Trevor	
2011	Hollywood Sex Wars	Onch	
2012	Hercules Saves Christmas	Elf Joseph	
2015	Road Hard	Himself	
2016	Mascots	Ron "The Worm" Trippman	
2016	Everybody Has an Andy Dick Story	Himself	TV movie documentary
2017	Little Evil	Gozamel	
2017	Poop Talk	Himself	Documentary
2025	Spinal Tap II: The End Continues	Daniel The Druid	
