= Tom DeMaio =

American football coach

Biographical details
- Born: c. 1961

Coaching career (HC unless noted)
- c. 1982: Hawthorne HS (NJ) (assistant)
- 1983: Western Connecticut (OB)
- 1985–1987: Northeastern (assistant)
- 1988: William Paterson (interim HC)

Head coaching record
- Overall: 3–7

Tom DeMaio Jr. (born c. 1961) is an American former football coach. He served for a single season as the interim head football coach at William Paterson University in Wayne, New Jersey, compiling a record of 3–7 in 1988.

DeMaio attended Hawthorne High School in Hawthorne, New Jersey, where played high school football as a quarterback for his father, Tom DeMaio Sr. He attended Franklin & Marshall College in Lancaster, Pennsylvania before transferring to Seton Hall University, from which he graduated in 1983.

== Head coaching record ==
Year	Team	Overall	Conference	Standing	Bowl/playoffs
William Paterson Pioneers (New Jersey Athletic Conference) (1988)
1988	William Paterson	3–7	2–4	T–5th	
William Paterson:		3–7	2–4		
Total:		3–7			
