= Hawthorne Public Schools =

School district in New Jersey, United States

Address
- 445 Lafayette Avenue Hawthorne, Passaic County, New Jersey, 07506; United States
- Coordinates: 40.95345°N 74.155252°W

District information
- Grades: PreK-12
- Superintendent: Matthew Mignanelli
- Business administrator: Sandy Vicale
- Schools: 5

Students and staff
- Enrollment: 2,229 (as of 2022–23)
- Faculty: 218.1 FTEs
- Student–teacher ratio: 10.2:1

Other information
- District Factor Group: DE
- Website: www.hawthorneschools.org
Ind.	Per pupil	District spending	Rank (*)	K-12 average	%± vs. average
1A	Total Spending	$17,680	31	$18,891	−6.4%
1	Budgetary Cost	13,962	39	14,783	−5.6%
2	Classroom Instruction	8,537	46	8,763	−2.6%
6	Support Services	2,112	41	2,392	−11.7%
8	Administrative Cost	1,464	26	1,485	−1.4%
10	Operations & Maintenance	1,492	25	1,783	−16.3%
13	Extracurricular Activities	300	12	268	11.9%
16	Median Teacher Salary	58,247	15	64,043
Data from NJDoE 2014 Taxpayers' Guide to Education Spending. *Of K-12 districts with 1,800-3,500 students. Lowest spending=1; Highest=68

The Hawthorne Public Schools are a comprehensive community public school district that serves students in pre-kindergarten through twelfth grade from Hawthorne, in Passaic County, in the U.S. state of New Jersey.

As of the 2022–23 school year, the district, comprised of five schools, had an enrollment of 2,229 students and 218.1 classroom teachers (on an FTE basis), for a student–teacher ratio of 10.2:1.

== History ==
By 1931, the Hawthorne district was incurring the cost of tuition and busing 400 students to Paterson Central High School leading to plans for a high school in Hawthorne could serve students at a cost lower than the tuition being paid to the Paterson Public Schools. The high school building opened in September 1933.

The district had been classified by the New Jersey Department of Education as being in District Factor Group "DE", the fifth-highest of eight groupings. District Factor Groups organize districts statewide to allow comparison by common socioeconomic characteristics of the local districts. From lowest socioeconomic status to highest, the categories are A, B, CD, DE, FG, GH, I and J.

== Awards and recognition ==
Jefferson Elementary School received the National Blue Ribbon Award for Excellence in the 2011-12 school year.

== Schools ==
Schools in the district (with 2022–23 enrollment data from the National Center for Education Statistics) are:

Elementary schools

- Jefferson Elementary School with 266 students in grades PreK–5
  - Stephen Droske, principal
- Roosevelt Elementary School with 545 students in grades K–5
  - Joseph Pisacane, principal
- Washington Elementary School with 257 students in grades K–5
  - Jackie Passero, principal

Middle school

- Lincoln Middle School with 517 students in grades 6–8
  - Erin Devor, principal

High school

- Hawthorne High School with 602 students in grades 9–12
  - Kevin Pfister, principal

== Administration ==
Core members of the district's administration are:

- Matthew Mignanelli, superintendent
- Sandy Vicale, business administrator and board secretary

== Board of education ==
The district's board of education, comprised of nine members, sets policy and oversees the fiscal and educational operation of the district through its administration. As a Type II school district, the board's trustees are elected directly by voters to serve three-year terms of office on a staggered basis, with three seats up for election each year held (since 2014) as part of the November general election. The board appoints a superintendent to oversee the district's day-to-day operations and a business administrator to supervise the business functions of the district.
