= Barbara Kasekende =

Ugandan businesswoman and corporate executive

- Born: c. 1979 (age 46–47); Uganda
- Citizenship: Uganda
- Education: Mount Saint Mary's College Namagunga; Elmhurst University; University of Texas at Dallas
- Occupations: Businesswoman & corporate executive
- Years active: 2005–present
- Title: Manager of Advisory Department at Uganda Development Bank

Barbara Kasekende is a Ugandan businesswoman and corporate executive who serves as the head of the Advisory Department at Uganda Development Bank, the country's only indigenous, government-owned development financial institution. She took up this position in February 2022. Before that, she was the corporate social investments manager at Stanbic Bank Uganda Limited, Uganda's largest commercial bank by assets.

== Background and education ==
Kasekende is a Ugandan national, born circa 1979 in the Buganda Region of Uganda. She attended Mount Saint Mary's College Namagunga for her high school education. In a 2020 interview, she described herself as the firstborn in her family.

She holds a Bachelor of Science in Computer Information Systems, awarded by Elmhurst University, in Elmhurst, Illinois, United States. She also holds a Master of Business Administration, obtained from the Naveen Jindal School of Management, at the University of Texas at Dallas, in Richardson, Texas, United States.

== Career ==
At the time she joined Uganda Development Bank in February 2022, Kasekende's business career went back nearly 14 years. She has had managerial responsibilities in various businesses and companies during that time. She has been a manager at AIG Uganda, Wild Places Africa, NFT Consult and Stanbic Bank Uganda. Her work experience includes business development, customer service, high-net worth customer relations and corporate social responsibility functions.

At Uganda Development Bank, Kasekende heads the bank's business advisory department, responsible for advising and guiding the bank's business clients and customers.
