= Glenn D. Lid =

American teacher

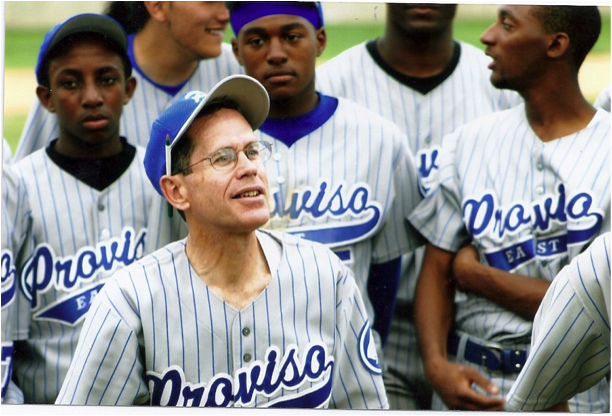
- Glenn D. Lid in 2012
- Born: 1957 (age 68–69); Chicago, Illinois
- Occupation: Science teacher
- Known for: National Teachers Hall of Fame
- Spouse: Carol Lid

Glenn D. Lid (born 1957) is an American teacher.

== Biography ==
Lid was born in Chicago. He was inducted into the National Teachers Hall of Fame in 2012. He won a Disney Award in 2004, as the Disney Secondary Teacher of The Year. He was named a Golden Apple Teacher of Distinction in 2007. He received the Davidson Award from the Chemical Industry Council of Illinois in 2007

== Honors and recognition ==
- National Teachers Hall of Fame in 2012
- Disney High School Teacher Of The Year in 2004
