= Matt McNamara =

American soccer player (born 1996)

Personal information
- Full name: Matthew McNamara
- Date of birth: 16 July 1996 (age 30)
- Place of birth: Ohio, United States
- Position: Defender

Team information
- Current team: Rio Branco-ES

College career
Years	Team	Apps	(Gls)
2014–2018	Elmhurst Bluejays	59	(6)

Senior career*
Years	Team	Apps	(Gls)
2020	Turbina	3	(1)
2020	Jarabacoa		
2022–	Rio Branco-ES		
- * Club domestic league appearances and goals

Matthew McNamara (born 16 July 1996) is an American soccer player who plays as a defender for Rio Branco-ES.

== Career ==
Before the second half of 2019–20, McNamara signed for Albanian side Turbina, where he made 3 league appearances and scored 1 goal. On 1 February 2020, he debuted for Turbina during a 2–1 loss to Devolli. On 29 February 2020, McNamara scored his first goal for Turbina during a 5–1 loss to Pogradeci.

In 2020, he signed for Jarabacoa in the Dominican Republic. Before the 2022 season, McNamara signed for Brazilian club Rio Branco-ES.
