= Shirley Booz =

American model and dancer

Personal details
- Born: June 28, 1927 Quincy, Illinois, U.S.
- Died: May 3, 2009 (aged 81) Sioux City, Iowa, U.S.
- Spouse: Dean Harrington
- Children: 3
- Education: Morningside College (BA)

Shirley Colleen Booz (June 28, 1927 – May 3, 2009) was an American model and dancer.

She appeared in a variety of advertisements created in the Chicago area in the 1930s and 40s, and also trained as dancer and performed with companies like the Chicago Civic Opera.

== Life and career ==
Shirley Colleen Booz was born in Quincy, Illinois, the daughter of Juanita Josephine "Jo" (née Strader 1908–1992) and Burdette "Burd" Booz (1905–1982). She had a younger brother, Gerald "Jerry" Booz. Her maternal grandmother, born Bertha Estella Boone, was a relative of Daniel Boone. Her family moved to Chicago where she grew up on the city's Westside, and she graduated from Austin High School.

As a teenager her mother began taking her into modeling competitions and auditions, where she would often be cast for print or fashion work. She began to be compared to Shirley Temple, who was a popular actress at the same time Booz was a model. Booz's face would appear on cereal box ads, and other things marketed toward children and teens. She started training as a dancer at a young age as well, and later danced professionally with companies like the Chicago Civic Opera.

Wanting to attend college, she enrolled at Elmhurst College, located in a suburb outside of Chicago. She did not like school there and returned to Chicago after a semester. She wanted to leave the hustle and bustle of Chicago, so she enrolled in Morningside College in Sioux City, Iowa, and left Chicago by train. Her father was a relative of E.C. Booz, known for making one of the earliest forms of whiskey in the United States, the bottle in which became known as the 'Booz Bottle'. The family name became a popular term to describe alcohol.

She graduated from Morningside College with her bachelor's degree in English. She helped to establish a Dance minor at the school, which it still offers today. At Morningside she met her future husband, a football player named Dean Harrington. Once she was married she began to be known by her nickname 'Chris Harrington', the origin of 'Chris' is not known.

She established her own school of dance, the Chris Harrington Dance Studio, where she taught thousands of students dance lessons for more than twenty years.

She had two daughters, Holly and Sally. Then in 1968 at age 41, she became pregnant with her third child, another daughter named Kelly. After her third child's birth, she decided to stop teaching dance due to the physical demands on her body. Her husband founded the real estate company Dean Harrington & Associates and was the Potentate of the Abu Bekr Shriners in 1974. Dean's mother, Mildred Harrington, has a music scholarship established a Morningside, given annually to a Piano student.

She died on May 3, 2009, at the age of 81 from stomach surgery complications.
