= Arthur Buikema =

American biologist and ecologist (1941–2026)

- Born: Arthur Louis Buikema Jr. February 4, 1941; Cook County, Illinois, U.S.
- Died: June 10, 2026 (aged 85); Blacksburg, Virginia, U.S.
- Education: Elmhurst University; University of Kansas
- Occupations: Biologist, ecologist
- Spouse: Mary Alison Galway

Arthur Louis Buikema Jr. (February 4, 1941 – June 10, 2026) was an American biologist and ecologist.

== Early life and career ==
Buikema was born in Cook County, Illinois, on February 4, 1941, the son of Arthur Louis Buikema Sr. and Jesse Marion Ebbens. He was raised in his family's farm in Beecher, Illinois. He attended Elmhurst University, earning his bachelor's degree. He also attended the University of Kansas, earning his master's degree and his PhD degree.

He served as a professor in the department of biological sciences at Virginia Tech from 1971 to 2015. During his years as a professor, he was named the Alumni Distinguished Professor of Ecology.

== Personal life and death ==
Buikema was married to Mary Alison Galway. Their marriage lasted until Buikema's death in 2026.

Buikema died in Blacksburg, Virginia, on June 10, 2026, at the age of 85.
