= Anthony Opal =

American writer

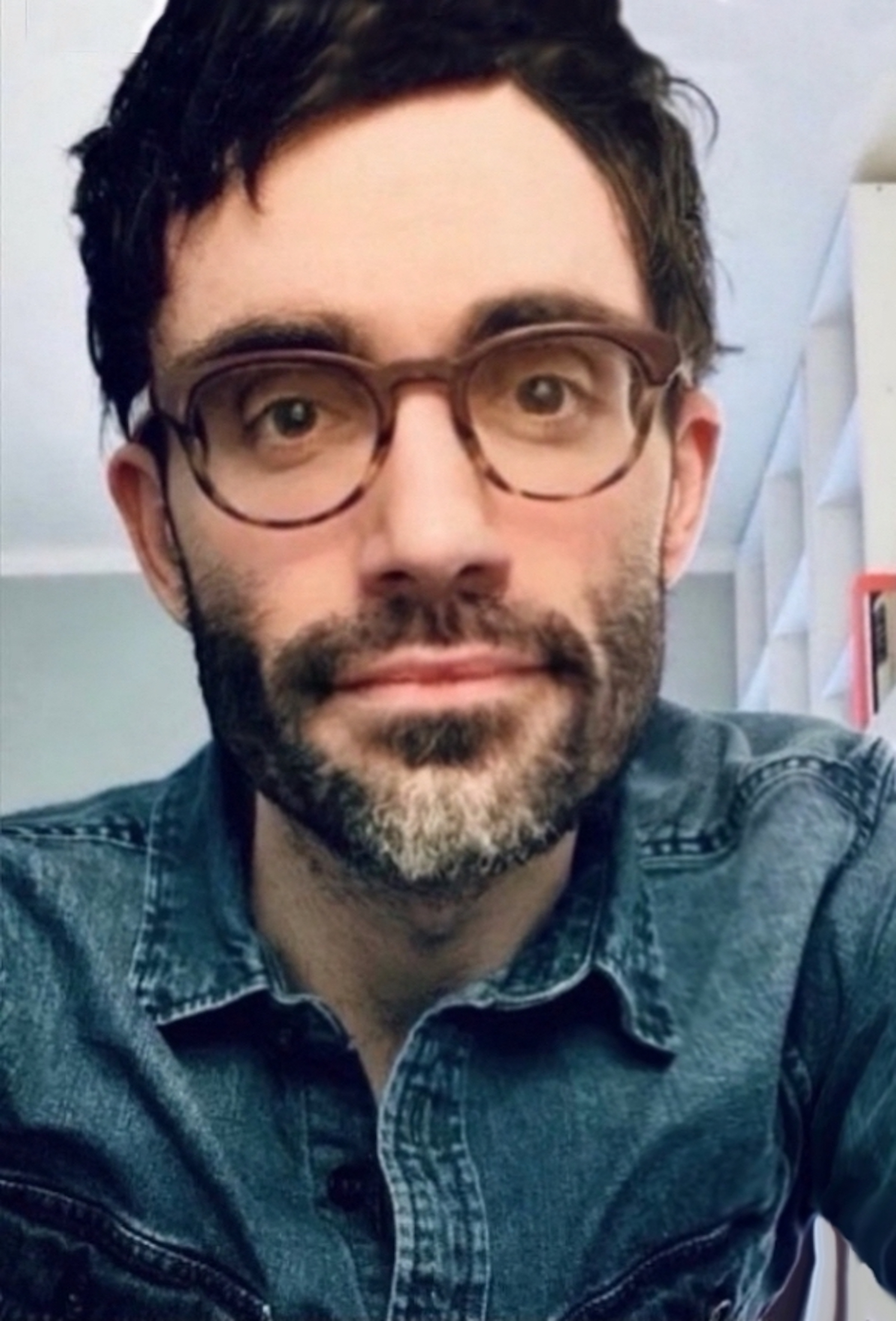
Anthony Opal, Chicago, 2021

Anthony Opal is an American poet, translator, and editor. His books include Action (2014), Procession (2020), and The Roof Above Our Heads (2021), as well as translations of Hatano Soha, Taneda Santoka, Kobayashi Issa, and a linguistic survey on the Book of Jonah. His work has appeared in various magazines and journals, including Poetry, Boston Review, Harvard Divinity Bulletin, and Notre Dame Review.

A contributor to the contemporary sonnet form, Douglas Kearney describes Opal's work as "adroit and contemplative," writing that Opal's poems "don't only fuck with ideas of the holy, they seek them out." Likewise, in The Conversant, Luke Fidler writes of Opal juxtaposing both images and "modes of experience, of remembering, of anticipating".

Opal received a BA in English literature from Elmhurst University and an MFA in creative writing from Northwestern University. He lives in Chicago, IL, where he edits The Economy Magazine + Press.
