= National Teachers Hall of Fame =

American nonprofit organization

- Established: 1989
- Location: Emporia, Kansas
- Coordinates: 38°25′04″N 96°10′51″W
- Type: non-profit
- Founder: Emporia State University; City of Emporia; Emporia Public Schools
- Director: Ralph Draper
- Website: nthf.org

The National Teachers Hall of Fame (NTHF) is a non-profit organization that honors exceptional school teachers. It was founded in 1989 by Emporia State University, the ESU Alumni Association, the City of Emporia, Emporia Public Schools, and the Emporia Area Chamber of Commerce. The NTHF has a museum on Emporia State's campus that honors the teachers inducted. It also has a teacher resource center, and a recognition program, which recognizes five of the nation's most outstanding educators each June. The Hall of Fame annually honors five teachers who have demonstrated commitment and dedication to teaching children. The first induction of five teachers was held in June 1992. To date, 155 teachers have been inducted into The National Teachers Hall of Fame representing 37 states and the District of Columbia.

== Awards ==
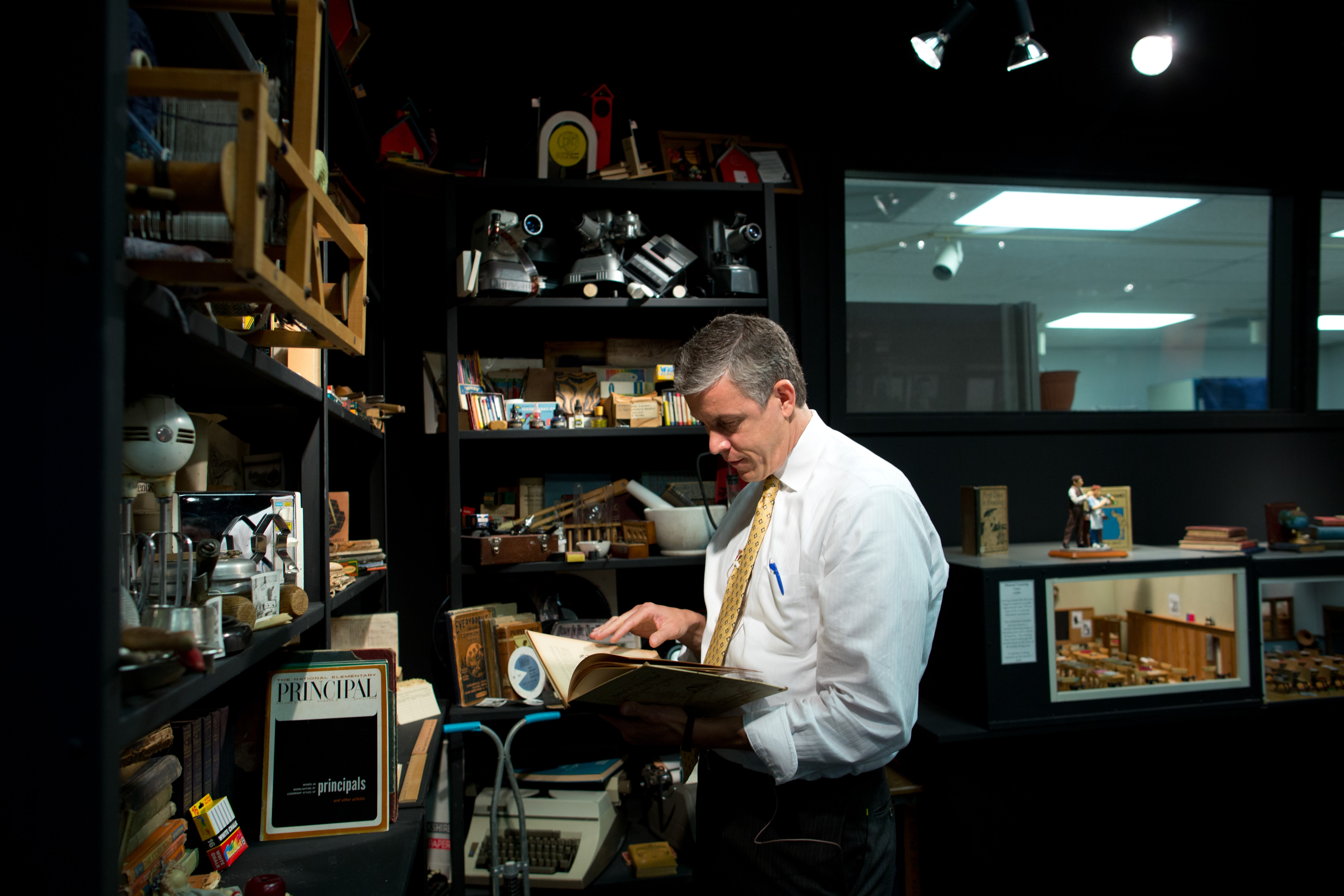
Former U.S. Department of Education Secretary Arne Duncan looks at a copy of Helpful Hints for the Rural Teacher at the National Teachers Hall of Fame in 2012.

Hall of Fame inductees will receive the following awards each year:

- A plaque bearing their name, picture, and a brief description for display in their school and the Hall of Fame
- A signet ring and lapel pin presented by Herff Jones, Inc.
- A permanent display in The National Teachers Hall of Fame museum
- A cast bronze Belltower Award sculpted by John Forsythe
- A personalized print of a one-room school classroom from American Fidelity Assurance
- Proclamations from the State of Kansas and the City of Emporia

== Notable inductees ==
Educators inducted into the Hall of Fame include:

- Monica Washington, 2023
- Kristen Record, 2023
- Dr. Caryn Long, 2023
- Dr. Erick Hueck, 2023
- Rebecca Hamilton, 2023
- Glenn D. Lid, 2012
- Warren G. Phillips, 2010
- Joseph W. Underwood, 2007
- Peggy Carlisle, 2006
- Marilyn Barrueta, 2005
- Ruth Ann Gaines, 2003
- Kathleen McGrath, 2003
- Jaime Escalante, 1999
- Debra Peppers, 1999
- Dorothy Lorentino, 1997

== Wall of Fame ==
The National Teachers Hall of Fame maintains a "Wall of Fame" in their museum which allows individuals and organizations, by way of donation to the museum, to honor a teacher with a personalized brick on the wall. Additionally, teachers are presented with a certificate and an online entry in the Wall of Fame database.

== National Memorial to Fallen Educators ==
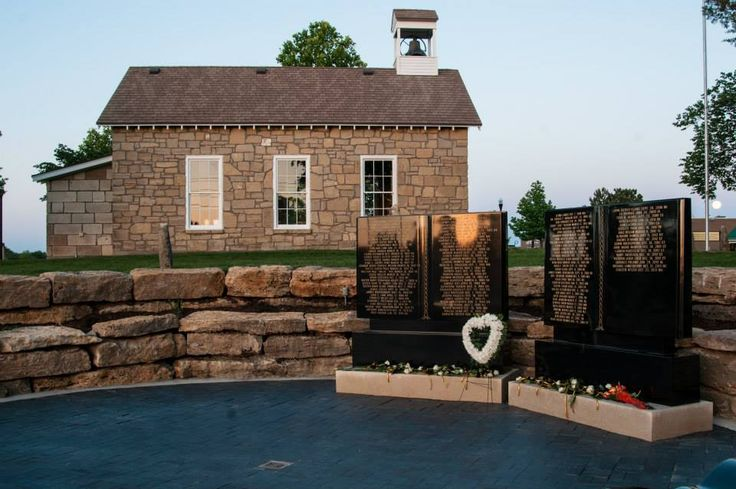
Memorial for Fallen Educators with the one-room school house in the background

On June 13, 2013, then-NTHF executive director Carol Strickland, along with former ESU President Michael Shonrock, Bill Maness, representing U.S. Senator Jerry Moran, and former mayor Rob Gilligan, broke ground by the one-room school house located on the Emporia State campus to build a memorial for the educators who have fallen in the "line of duty". The Sandy Hook Elementary School shooting was the main inspiration for the memorial. On June 6, 2014, the granite memorial markers were placed along with granite benches. The official dedication was on June 12, 2014.

On September 21, 2015, United States Senator Jerry Moran of Kansas introduced a bill to the United States Congress to designate the memorial as the National Memorial to Fallen Educators. The bill was signed into law April 30, 2018, and does not provide federal funds.

== See also ==
- List of national memorials of the United States
