= Joseph W. Underwood =

American teacher and athletic trainer (born 1953)

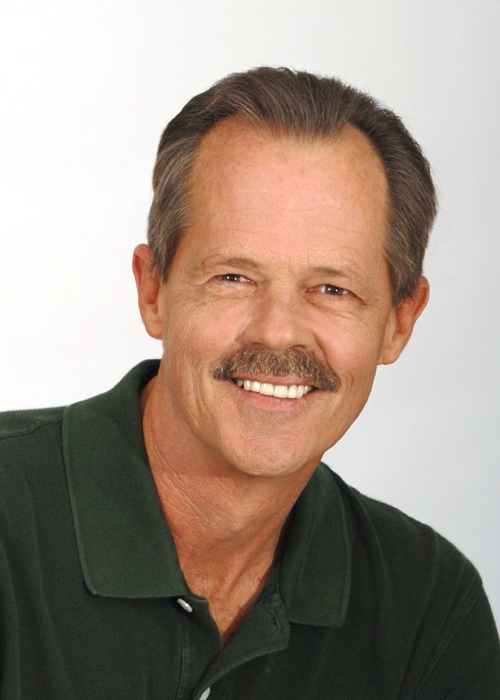
- Born: 1953 (age 72–73); Indianapolis, Indiana, U.S
- Occupation: High school teacher
- Spouse: Nancy Underwood
- Children: 1

Joseph W. Underwood (born 1953) is an American teacher and athletic trainer born in Indianapolis. Underwood was inducted into the National Teachers Hall of Fame. In 2007, Underwood was selected as a top 50 finalist in the Global Teacher Prize in 2018 by the Varkey Foundation.

== Teaching and coaching ==
Underwood taught at Miami Senior High School in Miami, Florida since 1985.

Underwood was recognized as a Disney American Teacher Award Honoree in 2004, and he was the lead author and editor of Today I Made a Difference: A Collection of Inspirational Stories from America's Top Educators. In 2002 and 2005, he was named Teacher of the Year at Miami High and also was selected by USA Today as a member of its All-Star Teacher Team. In 2006, Underwood joined 20 American teachers selected by the Toyota International Teacher Program as they went on an educational trip to the Galapagos Islands. The College Board recognized Underwood's approach to education in 2007 with the Bob Costas Award for the Teaching of Writing. Underwood went to Japan in 2008 as a member of the Japan Fulbright Memorial Fund teacher program."Gallery Japan 2008". In 2009, he received the Public Relations Award from the National Athletic Trainers' Association. Also in 2009, Underwood was inducted into the American Football News Today Hall of Fame for his 25 years of service as a game official at the semi-pro level. The Florida Education Association named Underwood its Teacher of Excellence in 2010, which led to his invitation to visit China in 2011 with the National Education Association and Pearson Foundation.

== Honors and recognition ==
- Disney American Teacher Honoree in 2004
- Global Teacher Prize finalist in 2018
