= Hawthorne High School (New Jersey) =

High school in Passaic County, New Jersey, US

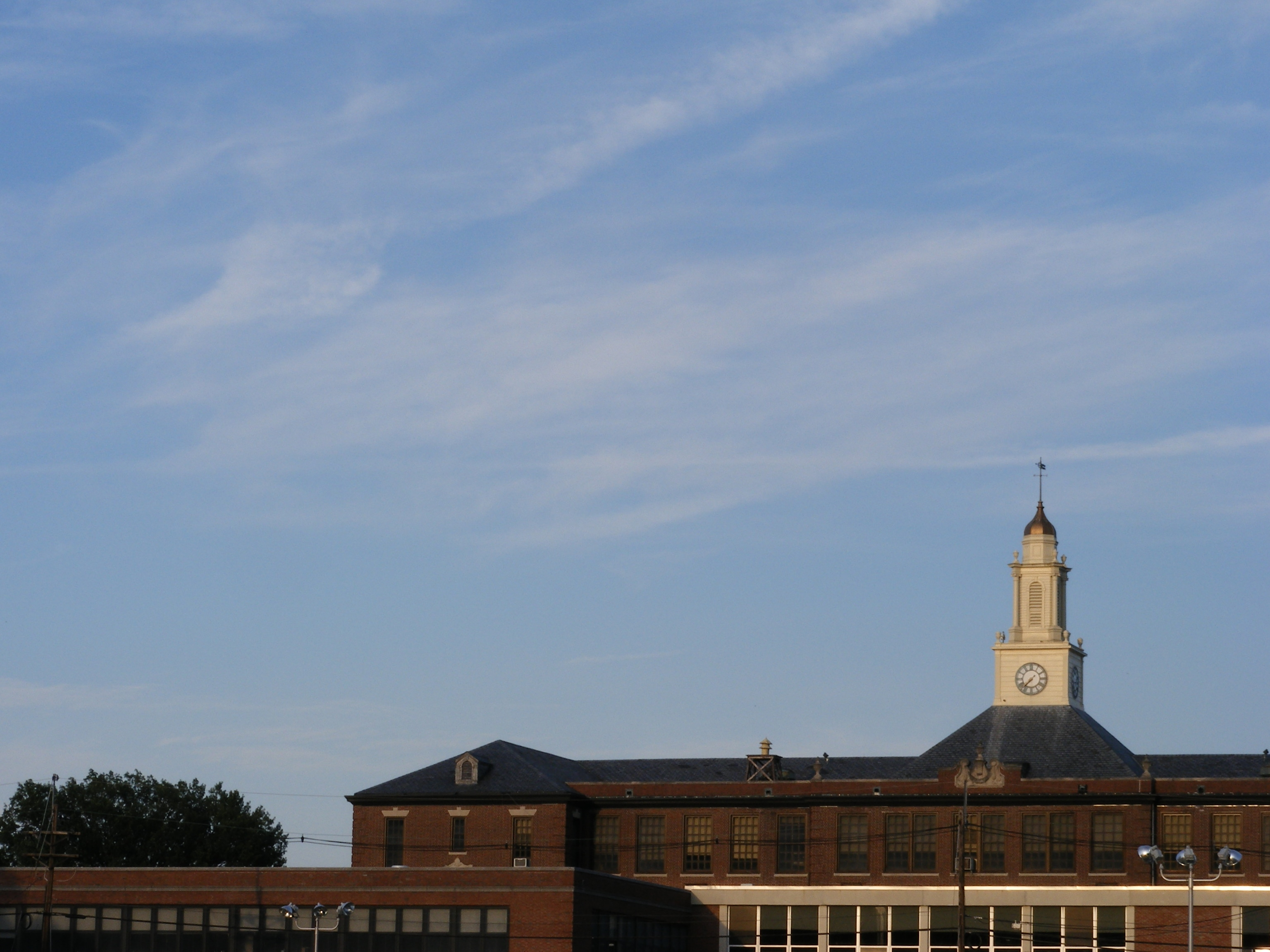

Location
- 160 Parmelee Avenue; Hawthorne, (Passaic County), New Jersey 07506; United States; 40.9535°N 74.1591°W

Information
- Type: Public high school
- Opened: September 1933
- School district: Hawthorne Public Schools
- NCES School ID: 340699004806
- Principal: Kevin Pfister
- Faculty: 52.9 FTEs
- Grades: 9-12
- Enrollment: 569 (as of 2024–25)
- Student to teacher ratio: 10.8:1
- Colors: Royal blue & white
- Athletics conference: North Jersey Interscholastic Conference
- Team name: Bears
- Publication: Empyrean (literary magazine)
- Newspaper: The Clarion
- Yearbook: Ursidae
- Website: hhs.hawthorneschools.org

Hawthorne High School is a four-year comprehensive public high school that serves students in 9th through twelfth grades from Hawthorne, in Passaic County, in the U.S. state of New Jersey. The school operates as the lone secondary school of the Hawthorne Public Schools.

As of the 2024–25 school year, the school had an enrollment of 569 students and 52.9 classroom teachers (on an FTE basis), for a student–teacher ratio of 10.8:1. There were 195 students (34.3% of enrollment) eligible for free lunch and 47 (8.3% of students) eligible for reduced-cost lunch.

== History ==
Plans for a building that would be used in part by a high school were presented in 1925, with an estimated cost of $360,000 (equivalent to $6.6 million in 2025)

By 1931, Hawthorne was incurring the cost of sending 400 students to Paterson Central High School and residents were considering that a high school in Hawthorne could serve students at a cost lower than the tuition being paid to the Paterson Public Schools and the cost of transporting students to and from Paterson.

The high school building opened in September 1933, with Lemuel Johnson serving as the school's first principal.

The district had been classified by the New Jersey Department of Education as being in District Factor Group "DE". District Factor Groups organize districts statewide to allow comparison by common socioeconomic characteristics of the local districts.

== Awards, recognition and rankings ==
The school was the 218th-ranked public high school in New Jersey out of 339 schools statewide in New Jersey Monthly magazine's September 2014 cover story on the state's "Top Public High Schools", using a new ranking methodology. The school had been ranked 234th in the state of 328 schools in 2012, after being ranked 171st in 2010 out of 322 schools listed. The magazine ranked the school 148th in 2008 out of 316 schools. The school was ranked 157th in the magazine's September 2006 issue, which surveyed 316 schools across the state.

The school set the Guinness World Record in 2013 for most people popping bubble wrap and was the first to hold the record before it was surpassed the following year.

== Curriculum ==
Starting in the 2013-2014 school year, Hawthorne High School switched to a modified rotating drop schedule, making more opportunities for new classes. The school will offer 19 honor classes along with 12 Advanced Placement classes and 25 new electives. For the 2017–18 school year, the high school added a second lunch to their drop schedule. The 2018–19 school year saw the addition of AP Computer Science.

== Athletics ==
The Hawthorne High School Bears participate in the North Jersey Interscholastic Conference, which is comprised of small-enrollment schools in Bergen, Hudson, Morris and Passaic counties, and was created following a reorganization of sports leagues in Northern New Jersey by the New Jersey State Interscholastic Athletic Association (NJSIAA). Prior to realignment that took effect in the fall of 2010, Hawthorne was a member of the smaller Bergen-Passaic Scholastic League (BPSL). With 513 students in grades 10–12, the school was classified by the NJSIAA for the 2019–20 school year as Group II for most athletic competition purposes, which included schools with an enrollment of 486 to 758 students in that grade range. The school was classified by the NJSIAA as Group I North for football for 2024–2026, which included schools with 254 to 474 students.

The boys' cross country team won the Group II state championship in 1973.

The football team won the North I Group II state sectional championship in 1974 (awarded by the NJSIAA), 1975 and 1978. A 14–12 win against Rutherford High School gave the 1975 team their first North I Group II sectional playoff championship and a 10-0-1 record for the season. The 1978 team won the North I Group II sectional title with a 19–14 win in the championship game against Lenape Valley Regional High School.

The field hockey team won the North I Group II state sectional championship in 1976.

The boys' wrestling team won the North I Group I state sectional title in 1994.

The girls' volleyball team won the Group II state championship in 2001 with a 31–0 record, defeating Union Catholic Regional High School in the tournament final. They also captured the Passaic County championship in that same season.

Interscholastic sports offered include:

Fall

- Marching band
- Football
- Soccer (boys & girls)
- Volleyball (girls)
- Tennis (girls)
- Cheerleading

Winter:

- Bowling
- Basketball (boys & girls)
- Cheerleading
- Indoor track (boys & girls)
- Wrestling

Spring:

- Marching band
- Golf
- Track (boys & girls)
- Lacrosse (boys)
- Base/Softball

== Marching band ==
There are approximately 20 students in grades 8 through 12 involved with the marching band.

== Administration ==
The school's principal is Kevin Pfister. His administration team includes two assistant principals.

== Notable alumni ==
- Fulvio Cecere (born 1960, class of 1978), actor
- Tom DeMaio (born c. 1961), former American football coach who served for a single season as the interim head football coach at William Paterson University
- Debbie Harry (born 1945, class of 1963), lead singer of Blondie
- Ivan Sergei (born 1972, class of 1989), actor best known for his work in television
- Michael Terrizzi (born 1953, class of 1971), former American football quarterback and punter who played for the Purdue Boilermakers football team
- Ed Van Put (1936–2024), fisherman, author, and conservationist
- Edwin J. Vandenberg (1918–2005, class of 1933), chemist at Hercules Inc. and a researcher at Arizona State University
