= Hawthorne, New Jersey =

Borough in Passaic County, New Jersey, US

- Borough
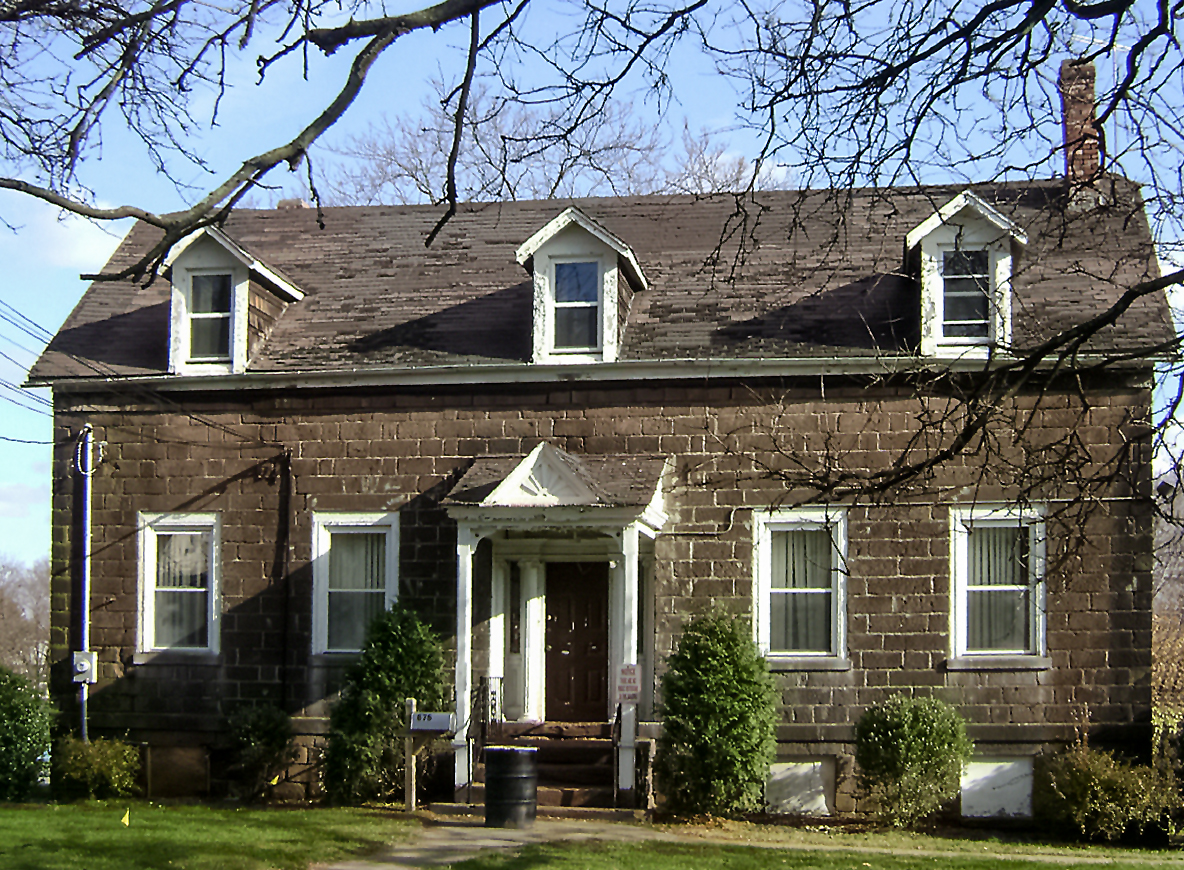
- John W. Rea House

- Seal

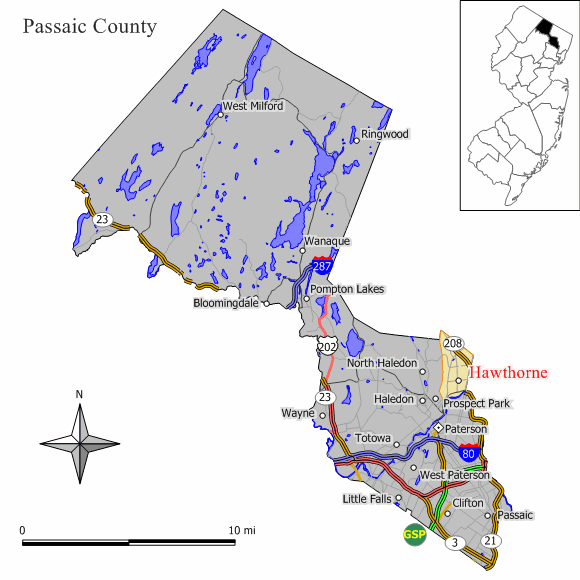
- Map of Hawthorne in Passaic County. Inset: Location of Passaic County highlighted in the State of New Jersey.

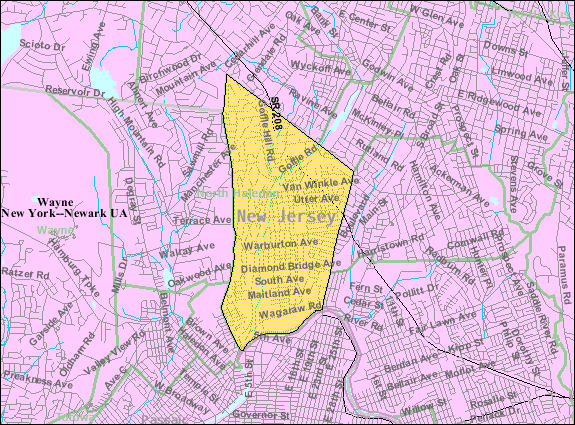
- Census Bureau map of Hawthorne, New Jersey

- Location in Passaic County Location in New Jersey Location in the United States
- Coordinates: 40.956957°N 74.158561°W
- Country: United States
- State: New Jersey
- County: Passaic
- Incorporated: March 24, 1898
- Named for: Nathaniel Hawthorne

Government
  - Type: Faulkner Act (mayor–council)
  - Body: Borough Council
  - Mayor: John V. Lane (R, term ends December 31, 2026)
  - Administrator: Vincent Caruso
  - Municipal clerk: Lori Fernandez

Area
  - Total: 3.35 sq mi (8.67 km^{2})
  - Land: 3.32 sq mi (8.59 km^{2})
  - Water: 0.031 sq mi (0.08 km^{2}) 0.90%
  - Rank: 320th of 565 in state 10th of 16 in county
- Elevation: 85 ft (26 m)

Population (2020)
  - Total: 19,637
  - Estimate (2023): 19,496
  - Rank: 140th of 565 in state 6th of 16 in county
  - Density: 5,918.3/sq mi (2,285.1/km^{2})
  - Rank: 91st of 565 in state 6th of 16 in county
- Time zone: UTC−05:00 (Eastern (EST))
  - Summer (DST): UTC−04:00 (Eastern (EDT))
- ZIP Codes: 07506–07507
- Area code: 973
- FIPS code: 3403130570
- GNIS feature ID: 0885249
- Website: www.hawthornenj.org

Hawthorne is a borough in Passaic County, in the U.S. state of New Jersey. As of the 2020 United States census, the borough's population was 19,637, an increase of 846 (+4.5%) from the 2010 census count of 18,791, which in turn reflected an increase of 573 (+3.1%) from the 18,218 counted in the 2000 census.

Hawthorne was established by an act of the New Jersey Legislature on March 24, 1898. The borough was created from parts of the now-defunct Manchester Township, which also consisted of present-day Haledon, North Haledon, Prospect Park, Totowa, and parts of Fair Lawn and Paterson. The borough was named for novelist Nathaniel Hawthorne.

== Geography ==
According to the United States Census Bureau, Hawthorne borough had a total area of 3.35 square miles (8.7 km^{2}), including 3.32 square miles (8.6 km^{2}) of land and 0.03 square miles (0.078 km^{2}) of water (0.90%).

Unincorporated communities, localities and place names located partially or completely within the borough include Goffle, North Hawthorne and Van Winkle.

The borough borders North Haledon, Prospect Park, and Paterson in Passaic County; and Fair Lawn, Glen Rock, Ridgewood and Wyckoff in Bergen County.

== Demographics ==
Historical population
Census	Pop.	Note	%±
1900	2,096		—
1910	3,400		62.2%
1920	5,135		51.0%
1930	11,868		131.1%
1940	12,610		6.3%
1950	14,816		17.5%
1960	17,735		19.7%
1970	19,173		8.1%
1980	18,200		−5.1%
1990	17,084		−6.1%
2000	18,218		6.6%
2010	18,791		3.1%
2020	19,637		4.5%
2023 (est.)	19,496	▼	−0.7%
Population sources: 1900–1920; 1900–1910 1900–1930; 1940–2000 2000; 2010 2020

=== 2020 census ===
As of the 2020 census, Hawthorne had a population of 19,637. The median age was 41.7 years. 19.6% of residents were under the age of 18 and 17.5% of residents were 65 years of age or older. For every 100 females there were 92.4 males, and for every 100 females age 18 and over there were 89.3 males age 18 and over.

100.0% of residents lived in urban areas, while 0.0% lived in rural areas.

There were 7,624 households in Hawthorne, of which 30.0% had children under the age of 18 living in them. Of all households, 49.3% were married-couple households, 16.7% were households with a male householder and no spouse or partner present, and 28.1% were households with a female householder and no spouse or partner present. About 26.2% of all households were made up of individuals and 11.3% had someone living alone who was 65 years of age or older.

There were 7,946 housing units, of which 4.1% were vacant. The homeowner vacancy rate was 0.8% and the rental vacancy rate was 3.9%.

Racial composition as of the 2020 census
Race	Number	Percent
White	13,902	70.8%
Black or African American	690	3.5%
American Indian and Alaska Native	89	0.5%
Asian	555	2.8%
Native Hawaiian and Other Pacific Islander	5	0.0%
Some other race	2,021	10.3%
Two or more races	2,375	12.1%
Hispanic or Latino (of any race)	4,778	24.3%

=== 2010 census ===
The 2010 United States census counted 18,791 people, 7,454 households, and 4,949 families in the borough. The population density was 5,635.3 per square mile (2,175.8/km^{2}). There were 7,756 housing units at an average density of 2,326.0 per square mile (898.1/km^{2}). The racial makeup was 88.62% (16,652) White, 2.27% (426) Black or African American, 0.21% (40) Native American, 2.82% (530) Asian, 0.00% (0) Pacific Islander, 4.28% (804) from other races, and 1.80% (339) from two or more races. Hispanic or Latino of any race were 15.42% (2,897) of the population.

Of the 7,454 households, 29.5% had children under the age of 18; 50.7% were married couples living together; 11.4% had a female householder with no husband present and 33.6% were non-families. Of all households, 27.6% were made up of individuals and 11.1% had someone living alone who was 65 years of age or older. The average household size was 2.52 and the average family size was 3.12.

21.4% of the population were under the age of 18, 7.3% from 18 to 24, 28.6% from 25 to 44, 28.3% from 45 to 64, and 14.4% who were 65 years of age or older. The median age was 40.2 years. For every 100 females, the population had 92.7 males. For every 100 females ages 18 and older there were 89.4 males.

The Census Bureau's 2006–2010 American Community Survey showed that (in 2010 inflation-adjusted dollars) median household income was $72,985 (with a margin of error of +/− $6,585) and the median family income was $83,136 (+/− $7,364). Males had a median income of $64,906 (+/− $7,150) versus $44,641 (+/− $2,852) for females. The per capita income for the borough was $33,872 (+/− $1,921). About 4.9% of families and 7.1% of the population were below the poverty line, including 11.4% of those under age 18 and 7.2% of those age 65 or over.

Same-sex couples headed 48 households in 2010, a 50% increase from the 32 counted in 2000.

=== 2000 census ===
As of the 2000 United States census there were 18,218 people, 7,260 households, and 4,929 families residing in the borough. The population density was 5,364.9 people per square mile (2,071.4 people/km^{2}). There were 7,419 housing units at an average density of 2,184.8 per square mile (843.6/km^{2}). The racial makeup of the borough was 93.75% White, 0.75% African American, 0.14% Native American, 1.89% Asian, 0.02% Pacific Islander, 1.58% from other races, and 1.88% from two or more races. Hispanic or Latino of any race were 7.43% of the population.

There were 7,260 households, out of which 28.8% had children under the age of 18 living with them, 54.1% were married couples living together, 10.3% had a female householder with no husband present, and 32.1% were non-families. 26.5% of all households were made up of individuals, and 11.1% had someone living alone who was 65 years of age or older. The average household size was 2.50 and the average family size was 3.07.

In the borough the population was spread out, with 21.8% under the age of 18, 6.5% from 18 to 24, 33.5% from 25 to 44, 22.7% from 45 to 64, and 15.5% who were 65 years of age or older. The median age was 38 years. For every 100 females, there were 91.1 males. For every 100 females age 18 and over, there were 87.7 males.

The median income for a household in the borough was $55,340, and the median income for a family was $65,451. Males had a median income of $46,270 versus $33,277 for females. The per capita income for the borough was $26,551. About 2.6% of families and 3.4% of the population were below the poverty line, including 4.0% of those under age 18 and 5.4% of those age 65 or over.

== Government ==
=== Local government ===
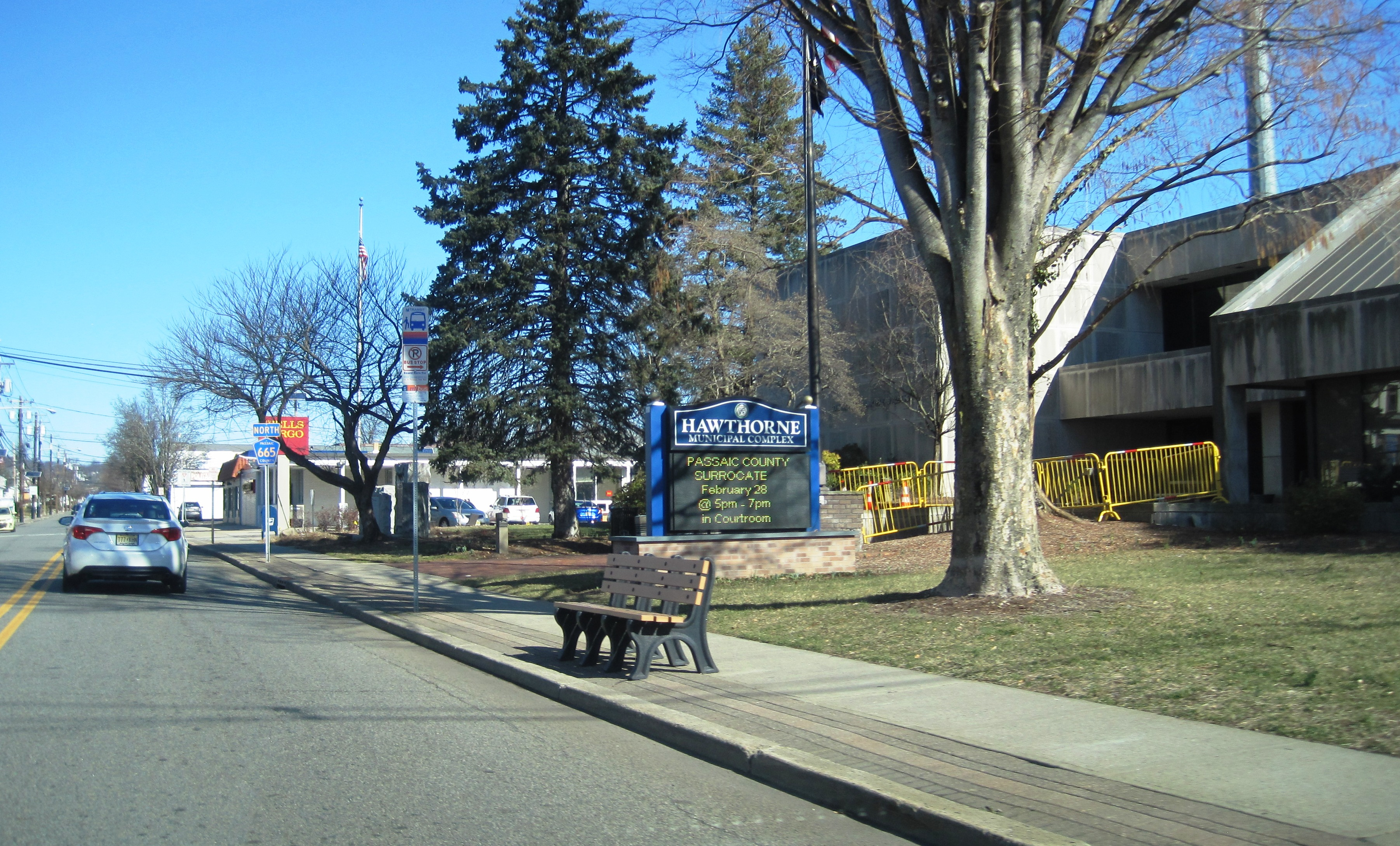
Hawthorne Municipal Complex

The Borough of Hawthorne is governed under the Faulkner Act, formally known as the Optional Municipal Charter Law, within the Mayor-Council system of municipal government. The township is one of 71 municipalities (of the 564) statewide that use this form of government. The governing body is comprised of the mayor and the seven-member borough council. A Charter Study Commission, formed in the 1980s after two major commercial businesses left the borough, led to a recommendation for the adoption of a mayor–council form in which there are four wards to give residents a representative in each area of the community, in addition to a mayor and two at-large members of the borough council, all of whom are directly elected by residents, with all members of the governing body serving four-year terms of office. After residents approved the commission's recommendations, the first election under the mayor–council form was held in 1989. The four ward seats are up for vote together and the three at-large seats and the mayoral position up for vote together two years later. All elections are held on a partisan basis as part of the November general election.

As of 2026, the Mayor of the Borough of Hawthorne is Republican John V. Lane, whose term of office ends December 31, 2025. Members of the Hawthorne Borough Council are Council President Frank E. Matthews (R, Ward 4, 2023),, Council Vice President Michael Sciarra (R, Ward 3, 2027), Bruce A. Bennett (R, at-large, 2029), Rayna Laiosa (R, Ward 2, 2027), Dominic Mele (R, at-large, 2029), Ann Marie Sasso (R, at-large, 2029) and Joseph R. Wojtecki (D, Ward 1, 2027).

In January 2020, the borough council appointed Michael Sciarra to fill the Ward 3 expiring in December 2023 that had been won by Garret G. Sinning, who died two weeks after winning re-election; Sciarra served on an interim basis until the November 2020 general election, when voters chose him to serve the balance of the term of office.

On July 29, 2008, former mayor Patrick Botbyl announced he would resign effective August 15, 2008. A special election was held on November 4, 2008, in which Republican Richard Goldberg defeated Democrat Joseph Wojtecki to become the mayor of Hawthorne for the remainder of Botbyl's term.

==== Emergency services ====
The Hawthorne Police Department is Led by its Chief James W. Knepper, who oversees two Captains, six Lieutenants, six Sergeants, 18 patrol and traffic officers and three detectives. The Police Headquarters is located at 445 Lafayette Avenue. The police department maintains several special units including K-9, motorcycle, quality of life, education and firearms. The department runs many community programs such as the Junior Police Academy, Citizen's Police Academy, ROAR Education, and a high school Criminal Justice program.

The Hawthorne Volunteer Fire Department, established in 1916, is an all-volunteer department, which maintains five stations. HFD staffs three Engines (Engine 1, Engine 3, Engine 4), one Platform Aerial (Tower 2), and a Heavy Rescue (Rescue 5). HFD has one Department Chief and five Assistant Chiefs. The Fire Department Headquarters is located at 828 Lafayette Avenue.

The Hawthorne Volunteer Ambulance Corps is an independent non-profit corporation dedicated to providing emergency medical services (EMS) to the Borough of Hawthorne and surrounding communities since 1932. HVAC maintains three full-size BLS units, one First Responder/Command Vehicle, and one chief's vehicle. The EMS Headquarters is located at 970 Goffle Road.

The Passaic County S.P.C.A. Humane Police Department is a law enforcement agency that is specifically empowered to enforce animal cruelty laws throughout Passaic County. Operating since the 1890s, the Passaic County S.P.C.A. relocated to Hawthorne in October 2017. The PCSPCA Humane Police Department maintains two black and white patrol vehicles. PCSPCA Headquarters is located at 794 Lafayette Avenue.

=== Federal, state and county representation ===
Hawthorne is located in the 9th Congressional District and is part of New Jersey's 40th state legislative district.

For the 119th United States Congress, New Jersey's 9th congressional district is represented by Nellie Pou (D, North Haledon) New Jersey is represented in the United States Senate by Democrats Cory Booker (Newark, term ends 2027) and Andy Kim (Moorestown, term ends 2031).

For the 2026–2027 session, the 40th legislative district of the New Jersey Legislature is represented in the State Senate by Kristin Corrado (R, Totowa) and in the General Assembly by Al Barlas (R, Cedar Grove) and Christopher DePhillips (R, Wyckoff).

Passaic County is governed by a Board of County Commissioners, comprised of seven members who are elected at-large to staggered three-year terms office on a partisan basis, with two or three seats coming up for election each year as part of the November general election in a three-year cycle. At a reorganization meeting held in January, the board selects a Director and Deputy Director from among its members to serve for a one-year term. As of 2026, Passaic County's Commissioners are: Director Cassandra "Sandi" Lazzara (D), Little Falls, term as commissioner ends December 31, 2027; term as director ends 2026), Deputy Director Orlando Cruz (D, Paterson, term as commissioner and as deputy director ends 2026), Rodney DeVore (D, Paterson, 2027), Bruce James (D, Clifton, 2026) Michael Ramaglia (D, West Milford, 2028), Christina Schratz (D, Passaic, 2028) and Nick Veliky (D, Clifton, appointed to a term ending in 2027).

Constitutional officers, elected on a countywide basis, are County Clerk Danielle Ireland-Imhof (D, Hawthorne, 2028), Sheriff Thomas Adamo (D, Wayne, 2027) and Surrogate Zoila S. Cassanova (D, Wayne, 2026).

=== Politics ===
As of March 2011, there were a total of 12,060 registered voters in Hawthorne, of which 2,938 (24.4% vs. 31.0% countywide) were registered as Democrats, 3,934 (32.6% vs. 18.7%) were registered as Republicans and 5,181 (43.0% vs. 50.3%) were registered as Unaffiliated. There were 7 voters registered as Libertarians or Greens. Among the borough's 2010 Census population, 64.2% (vs. 53.2% in Passaic County) were registered to vote, including 81.7% of those ages 18 and over (vs. 70.8% countywide).

Gubernatorial election results for Hawthorne
Year	Republican		Democratic		Third party(ies)	
Year	No.	%	No.	%	No.	%
2025	3,809	47.40%	4,186	52.09%	41	0.51%
2021	3,569	55.94%	2,742	42.98%	69	1.08%
2017	2,391	48.75%	2,426	49.46%	88	1.79%
2013	3,385	61.96%	2,015	36.88%	63	1.15%
2009	3,139	54.46%	2,324	40.32%	301	5.22%
2005	2,930	50.27%	2,753	47.23%	146	2.50%

In the 2012 presidential election, Democrat Barack Obama received 49.9% of the vote (4,195 cast), ahead of Republican Mitt Romney with 48.9% (4,114 votes), and other candidates with 1.2% (101 votes), among the 8,480 ballots cast by the borough's 12,679 registered voters (70 ballots were spoiled), for a turnout of 66.9%. In the 2008 presidential election, Republican John McCain received 4,618 votes (50.6% vs. 37.7% countywide), ahead of Democrat Barack Obama with 4,256 votes (46.6% vs. 58.8%) and other candidates with 78 votes (0.9% vs. 0.8%), among the 9,132 ballots cast by the borough's 12,101 registered voters, for a turnout of 75.5% (vs. 70.4% in Passaic County). In the 2004 presidential election, Republican George W. Bush received 4,614 votes (52.7% vs. 42.7% countywide), ahead of Democrat John Kerry with 3,863 votes (44.1% vs. 53.9%) and other candidates with 52 votes (0.6% vs. 0.7%), among the 8,753 ballots cast by the borough's 11,624 registered voters, for a turnout of 75.3% (vs. 69.3% in the whole county).

Presidential elections results
Year	Republican	Democratic	Third Parties
2024	51.9% 5,381	45.3% 4,699	2.8% 263
2020	46.3% 5,254	51.2% 5,812	2.5% 159
2016	49.5% 4,400	46.2% 4,111	3.3% 293
2012	48.9% 4,114	49.9% 4,195	1.2% 101
2008	50.6% 4,618	46.6% 4,256	0.9% 78
2004	52.7% 4,614	44.1% 3,863	0.6% 52

In the 2013 gubernatorial election, Republican Chris Christie received 62.0% of the vote (3,385 cast), ahead of Democrat Barbara Buono with 36.9% (2,015 votes), and other candidates with 1.2% (63 votes), among the 5,586 ballots cast by the borough's 12,874 registered voters (123 ballots were spoiled), for a turnout of 43.4%. In the 2009 gubernatorial election, Republican Chris Christie received 3,139 votes (53.7% vs. 43.2% countywide), ahead of Democrat Jon Corzine with 2,324 votes (39.8% vs. 50.8%), Independent Chris Daggett with 265 votes (4.5% vs. 3.8%) and other candidates with 36 votes (0.6% vs. 0.9%), among the 5,844 ballots cast by the borough's 11,836 registered voters, yielding a 49.4% turnout (vs. 42.7% in the county).

United States Senate election results for Hawthorne1
Year	Republican		Democratic		Third party(ies)	
Year	No.	%	No.	%	No.	%
2024	4,928	50.34%	4,547	46.45%	314	3.21%
2018	3,466	48.17%	3,384	47.03%	346	4.81%
2012	3,530	46.16%	3,980	52.05%	137	1.79%
2006	2,574	53.02%	2,201	45.33%	80	1.65%

United States Senate election results for Hawthorne2
Year	Republican		Democratic		Third party(ies)	
Year	No.	%	No.	%	No.	%
2020	4,927	44.59%	5,792	52.42%	330	2.99%
2014	1,953	48.14%	2,040	50.28%	64	1.58%
2013	1,609	52.43%	1,436	46.79%	24	0.78%
2008	3,872	47.50%	4,117	50.51%	162	1.99%

== Education ==
The Hawthorne Public Schools serve public school students in pre-kindergarten through twelfth grade. As of the 2022–23 school year, the district, comprised of five schools, had an enrollment of 2,229 students and 218.1 classroom teachers (on an FTE basis), for a student–teacher ratio of 10.2:1. Schools in the district (with 2022–23 enrollment data from the National Center for Education Statistics) are Jefferson Elementary School with 266 students in grades PreK-5, Roosevelt Elementary School with 545 students in grades K-5, Washington Elementary School with 257 students in grades K-5, Lincoln Middle School with 517 students in grades 6-8 and Hawthorne High School with 602 students in grades 9-12.

St. Anthony School, a K–8 Catholic school that opened in 1912, operates under the supervision of the Roman Catholic Diocese of Paterson. Hawthorne Christian Academy is an interdenominational evangelical Christian school established in 1981 by the Hawthorne Gospel Church, serving students in preschool through twelfth grade.

== Transportation ==
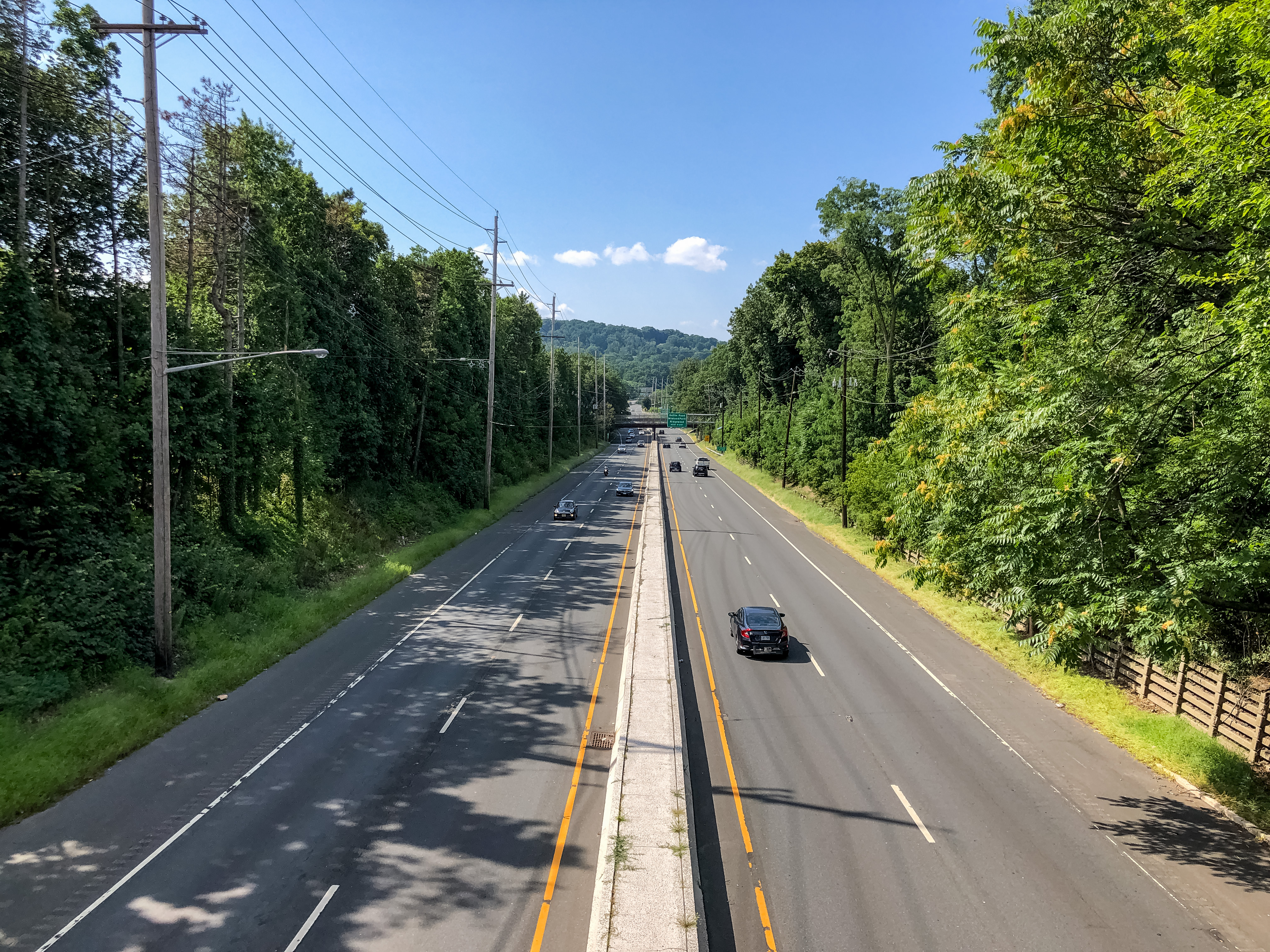
Route 208 northbound in Hawthorne

=== Roads and highways ===
As of May 2010, the borough had a total of 61.77 miles (99.41 km) of roadways, of which 47.63 miles (76.65 km) were maintained by the municipality, 12.45 miles (20.04 km) by Passaic County and 1.69 miles (2.72 km) by the New Jersey Department of Transportation.

Several major roadways pass through the borough. Route 208 is the main state highway serving Hawthorne. Other significant roads passing through Hawthorne include County Route 504.

=== Public transportation ===
NJ Transit provides train service at the Hawthorne station providing service on the Main Line to Secaucus Junction and Hoboken Terminal.

NJ Transit provides bus service on the 148 route to the Port Authority Bus Terminal in Midtown Manhattan, with local service on the 722 route.

== Community ==
Hawthorne is home to the Hawthorne Caballeros Drum and Bugle Corps, which was founded in 1946 and competes as an all-age corps in Drum Corps Associates, Headquartered at Hawthorne's American Legion Post 199, the Hawthorne Caballeros have won six world championships and more than a dozen state titles.

== Notable people ==
People who were born in, residents of, or otherwise closely associated with Hawthorne include:

- Bennie Borgmann (1898–1978), professional baseball and basketball player and coach who was inducted into the Naismith Memorial Basketball Hall of Fame
- Maurice Carthon (born 1961), former running back for the New York Giants
- Fulvio Cecere (born 1960), actor
- Beth Fowler (born 1940), actress
- Maria Mazziotti Gillan (born 1940), poet, professor and editor; winner of an American Book Award (2008)
- John Girgenti (born 1947), New Jersey State Senator from the 35th Legislative District
- Debbie Harry (born 1945), rock and roll musician who originally gained fame as the front-woman for the new wave band Blondie
- Don La Greca (born 1968), co-host of ESPN New York's The Michael Kay Show
- Dale Memmelaar (born 1937), offensive lineman who played in the NFL from 1959 through 1967
- Russ Meneve, stand-up comedian
- Roberta Naas (born 1958), journalist
- Ivan Sergei (born 1972), television actor
- Edwin J. Vandenberg (1918–2005), polymer chemist at Hercules Inc. and a researcher at Arizona State University
- C. Alfred Voegeli (1904–1984), bishop of the Episcopal Diocese of Haiti, serving from 1943 to 1971
