= Murder of Jennie Bosschieter =

American murder victim (1883–1900)

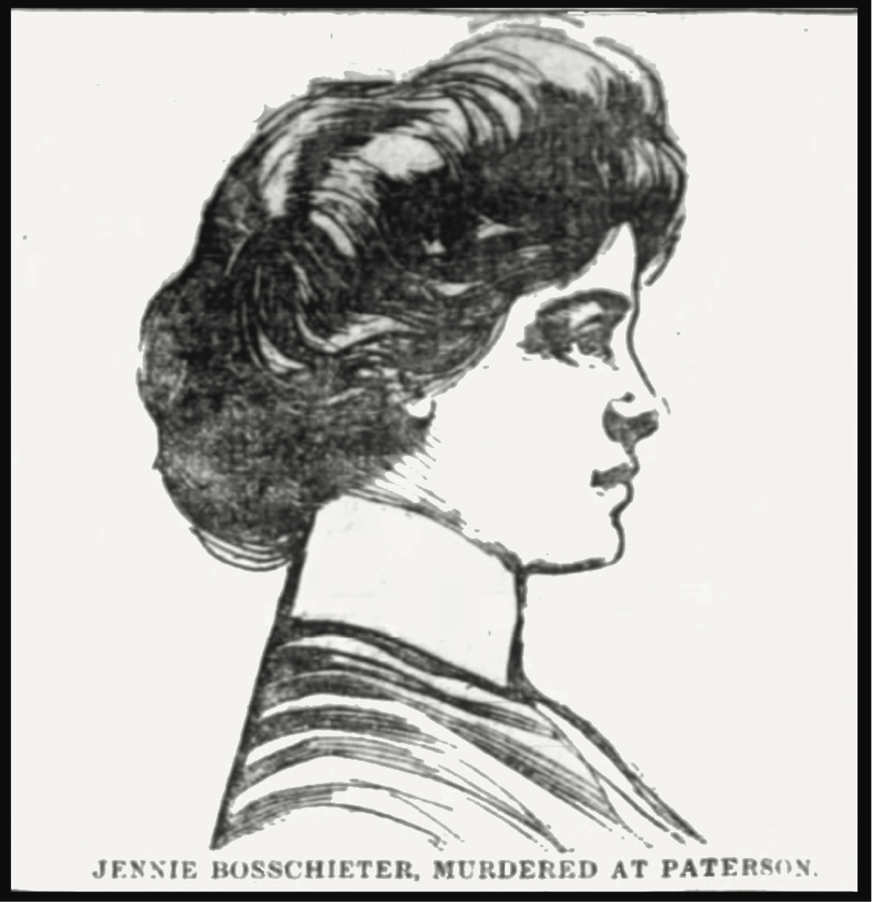
Jennie Bosschieter, murder victim

The murder of Jennie Bosschieter occurred on October 19, 1900 in Paterson, New Jersey. Bosschieter was a 17-year-old girl who was raped prior to her killing. She was an early victim of the date rape drug chloral hydrate which caused her death. Her death received national news coverage and was described as "one of the most revolting [crimes] ever committed in New Jersey."

== Murder ==
Jennie left home on October 18, 1900, at approximately 8pm to purchase baby powder for a young niece at the drug store. While there she encountered two men named William A. Death (pronounced "Deeth") and Andrew Campbell. Jennie had previously dated Death but he had abruptly dropped her and married another woman, five weeks earlier. She spoke to them for a few minutes and headed inside the store. While she was inside, Walter McAlister, a wealthy young man, approached Death. McAlister suggested Death invite Jennie to go to Saal's Saloon, which was located nearby at the corner of River Street and Bridge Street.

Death persuaded Jennie to go to the saloon with him and Campbell. While they were there, McAlister dropped in, as if by accident, and while Jennie's back was turned, he spiked her absinthe frappe with chloral hydrate. When she did not pass out immediately, McAlister put a second dose of chloral hydrate into her drink---an amount which turned out to be lethal. When Jennie passed out, McAlister called his friend George, who was waiting at a nearby hotel, and he hired a cab to pick up the group. They took the girl to a secluded area, raped her, and she died sometime during the assault from the effects of the drug. When the men couldn't revive her, they grew frantic and went to the home of a doctor, who came outside and pronounced Jennie dead.

At the doctor's insistence, the men left with the girl's body. Jennie was found a few hours later, lying a short distance away from the Wagaraw Bridge (now known as the Lincoln Ave. Bridge) on the Bergen County, New Jersey, side of the Passaic River in Columbia Heights section what is now Fair Lawn, between 5:30 and 6:15 am. The discovery was made by Marinus Gary on his way to work. Her head rested on a jagged rock, and there was a fracture of her skull near the base of her brain. Initially, the skull fracture was thought to be the cause of death but it was determined the damage to her skull was postmortem. The description of her body at discovery was made in an article in the Trenton Times dated October 20, 1900. "She lay as though asleep. She was stretched out on her back, her hands lying at her side, palms downward and fingers relaxed. One leg crossed and the other at the ankle. Her dress was not disturbed and was stretched at full length." The coroner estimated the time of death to have been two to three hours before discovery.

An article in the Newark Daily Advocate dated January 29, 1901, described the account of the carriage driver, Augustus Sculthorpe, who came forward to police and gave them a break in the case. According to the report, Sculthorpe told police that on October 19 he was called to Saal's saloon and that at midnight, four men carried an unconscious girl from the saloon to his coach. Sculthorpe says he then drove out to a road house, which was closed. Sculthorpe said he then started back towards Paterson. Somewhere on the road the girl was taken from the hack and "ill treated."

== Aftermath and trial ==
George J. Kerr, Walter C. McAlister, Andrew J. Campbell, and William A. Death were indicted for her murder and arraigned on November 17, 1900, before Judge Dixon. Newspapers at the time made clear that the attackers were not "wild boys" but were instead "old enough to know the meaning of consequences." They were described as "men of families well known and respected in Paterson."

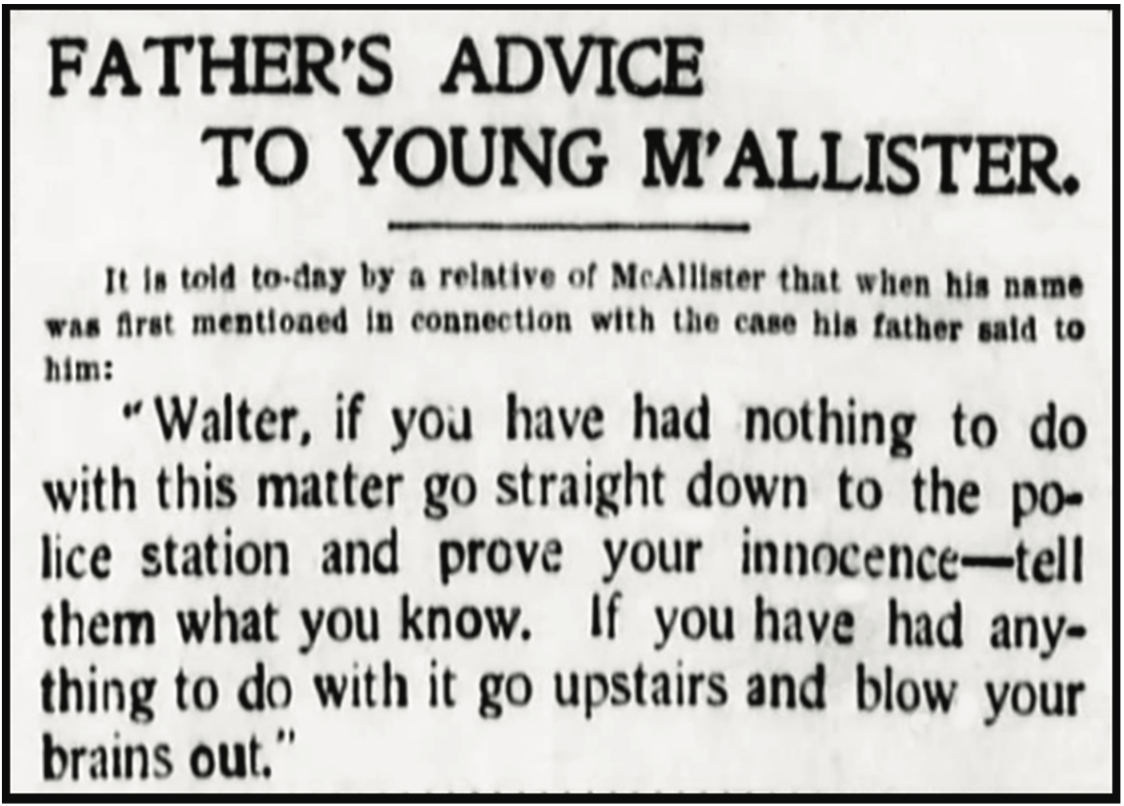
Walter McAlister being named as a suspect shocked the city and was a blow to the family's reputation.

The city of Paterson was shocked. McAlister was from a very wealthy, respectable family in Paterson. The McAlisters owned a number of businesses and employed a substantial number of Paterson residents at their mill and breweries. McAlister's father, who had spent decades establishing his reputation in the city, was so humiliated by the accusation, he offered his son some harsh advice which was reprinted in the local papers.

George Kerr's family was similarly affluent and his father was a devoutly religious man. George's brother John was a judge and his brother-in-law was the mayor of Paterson. George himself was married and, at the time of the attack, his wife was eight months pregnant with his sixth child. Death had married into a prosperous family just over a month before the crime. Campbell was working class and the youngest of the men, but he was very well thought of. Of all the men, there was the most doubt of Campbell's guilt.

All four men pleaded not guilty. The trial was set for January 14 of the following year. Walter C. McAlister, Andrew J. Campbell, and William A. Death were tried together. At the last minute, newspapers announced George Kerr would be tried separately. Several outlets incorrectly reported that George had turned state's evidence, but this was not true. He had not been present when the drug that killed Jennie was administered.

Jennie's parents attended the trial, as did Death's young wife Charlotte, Judge John Kerr, and others. At the trial the defense tried to blame her death on the absinthe and not the overdose of chloral hydrate. They blamed Jennie's parents for letting her go out. They blamed Jennie for accepting the men's invitation. They suggested she had victimized the men who stood accused of her murder. The jury rejected that the death was from the absinthe and that the murder was premeditated. The men were found guilty of murder in the second degree for her killing and sentenced to thirty years imprisonment at hard labor.

George initially entered a plea of Not Guilty, but after the other men were found guilty, George changed his plea to the charge of rape to "non vult contendere" or No Contest. He was sentenced to fifteen years imprisonment at hard labor.

All four sentences were the maximum the law would allow. The appeals of the men were rejected.

== Legacy ==
Jennie's murder received national press coverage for months after her death. The scandalous nature of her death and the power dynamics between her and her murderers drove much of the interest in the story. Jennie was a working class girl; the men who attacked her were wealthy and powerful.

There was a possible copycat crime on March 12, 1901, with Mary Paige drugged, raped and found severely ill, however, Paige did recover. Three boys were convicted of assault and served brief sentences.
