= Paterson, New Jersey =

City in Passaic County, New Jersey, US

- City
- Downtown Paterson in 2026, with Manhattan visible in the background

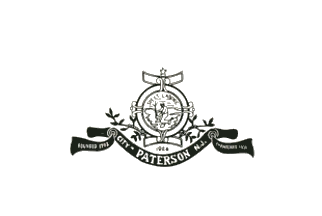
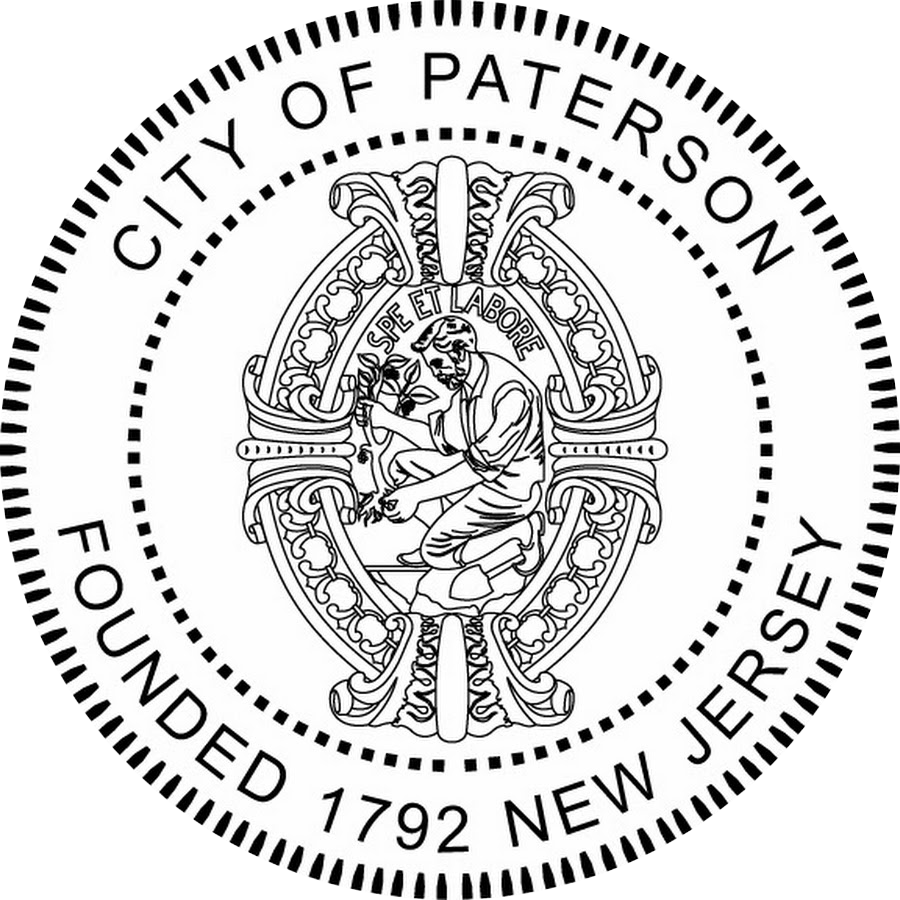
- Flag Seal Coat of arms Logo
- Nickname: The Silk City
- Motto: Spe et Labore (Latin) "By hope and effort"
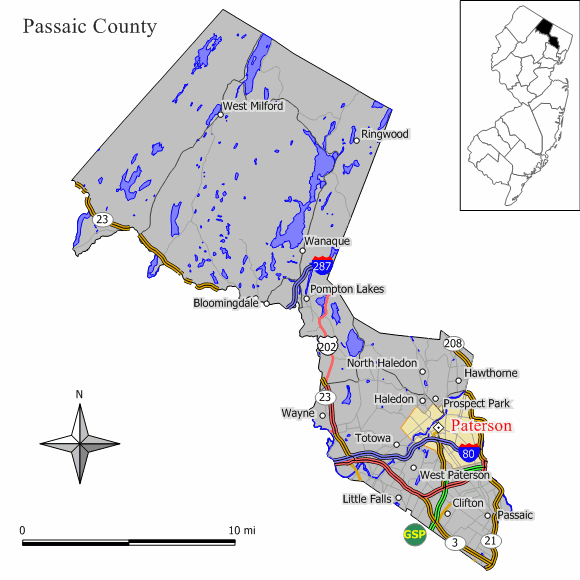
- Location of Paterson in Passaic County highlighted in yellow (left). Inset map: Location of Passaic County in New Jersey highlighted in black (right).

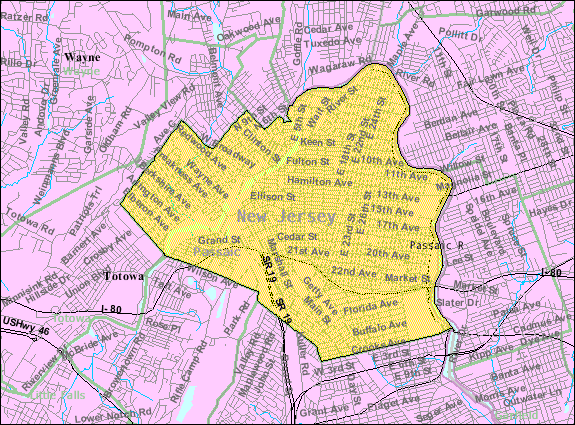
- Census Bureau map of Paterson, New Jersey

- Location in Passaic County Location in New Jersey Location in the United States
- Coordinates: 40°55′0″N 74°10′20″W
- Country: United States
- State: New Jersey
- County: Passaic
- Established: November 22, 1791
- Incorporated: April 11, 1831 (as township)
- Reincorporated: April 14, 1851 (as city)
- Named for: William Paterson

Government
  - Type: Faulkner Act Mayor-Council
  - Body: City Council
  - Mayor: Andre Sayegh (term ends June 30, 2030)
  - Business Administrator: Daniel Golabek
  - Municipal clerk: Edith G. Gil

Area
  - Total: 8.71 sq mi (22.55 km^{2})
  - Land: 8.41 sq mi (21.79 km^{2})
  - Water: 0.29 sq mi (0.76 km^{2}) 3.38%
  - Rank: 224th of 565 in state 7th of 16 in county
- Elevation: 112 ft (34 m)

Population (2020)
  - Total: 159,732
  - Estimate (2025): 161,793
  - Rank: 165th in country (as of 2025); 3rd of 565 in state 1st of 16 in county
  - Density: 18,986.3/sq mi (7,330.7/km^{2})
  - Rank: 11th of 565 in state 2nd of 16 in county
- Time zone: UTC−05:00 (Eastern (EST))
  - Summer (DST): UTC−04:00 (Eastern (EDT))
- ZIP Codes: 07501-07505, 07508–07514, 07522, 07524, 07533, 07538, 07543, 07544
- Area codes: 201 and 973
- FIPS code: 3403157000
- Website: patersonnj.gov

Paterson (English pronunciation: /ˈpætɚsən/) is the largest city in and the county seat of Passaic County, in the North Jersey region of the U.S. state of New Jersey. As of the 2020 United States census, Paterson was the state's third-most-populous municipality, with a population of 159,732, an increase of 13,533 (+9.3%) from the 2010 census count of 146,199, which in turn reflected a decline of 3,023 (-2.0%) from the 149,222 counted in the 2000 census. The Census Bureau's Population Estimates Program calculated a population of 161,793 for 2025, making it the 165th-most populous municipality in the nation.

A prominent mill town within the New York–New Jersey metropolitan area, Paterson has been known as Silk City for its once-dominant role in silk production during the latter half of 19th century. It has since evolved into a major destination for Hispanic immigrants as well as for immigrants from Turkey, the Arab world, and South Asia. Paterson has the nation's second-largest per capita Muslim population.

== History ==
The area of Paterson was inhabited by the Algonquian-speaking Native American Acquackanonk tribe of the Lenape, also known as the Delaware Indians. The land was known as the Lenapehoking. The Dutch claimed the land as New Netherlands, followed by the British as the Province of New Jersey.

=== Establishment ===
In 1791, Alexander Hamilton (1755/57–1804), first United States Secretary of the Treasury, helped found the Society for Establishing Useful Manufactures (S.U.M.), which helped encourage the harnessing of energy from the Great Falls of the Passaic River to secure economic independence from British manufacturers. The society founded Paterson, which became the cradle of the Industrial Revolution in the United States. Paterson was named for William Paterson, statesman, signer of the Constitution and Governor of New Jersey, who signed the 1792 charter that established the Town of Paterson.

Architect, engineer and city planner Pierre L'Enfant (1754–1825), who had earlier developed the initial plans for Washington, D.C., was the first planner for the S.U.M. project. His plan proposed to harness the power of the Great Falls through a channel in the rock and an aqueduct. The society's directors felt he was taking too long and was over budget; he was replaced by Peter Colt, who used a less complicated reservoir system to get the water flowing to factories in 1794. Eventually, Colt's system developed some problems and a scheme resembling L'Enfant's original plan was used after 1846.

Paterson was originally formed as a township from portions of Acquackanonk Township on April 11, 1831, while the area was still part of Essex County. It became part of the newly created Passaic County on February 7, 1837, and was incorporated as a city on April 14, 1851, based on the results of a referendum held that day. The city was reincorporated on March 14, 1861.

=== Industrial growth ===
The 77-foot-high (23 m) Great Falls and a system of water raceways that harnessed the falls' power provided power for the mills in the area until 1914 and fostered growth of the city. The district originally included dozens of mill buildings and other manufacturing structures associated with the textile industry and, later, the firearms, silk, and railroad locomotive manufacturing industries. Silk making grew to become the leading industry in the late 19th century that led to the most flourishing times for Paterson, hence giving it the moniker "Silk City."

In 1835, Samuel Colt began producing firearms in Paterson, but within a few years moved his business to Hartford, Connecticut. Later in the 19th century, Paterson was the site of early experiments with submarines by Irish-American inventor John Philip Holland. Two of Holland's early models—one found at the bottom of the Passaic River—are on display in the Paterson Museum, housed in the former Rogers Locomotive and Machine Works near the Passaic Falls.

Behind Newark and New York, the brewing industry was booming in Paterson in the late 1800s. Braun Brewery, Sprattler & Mennell, Graham Brewery, The Katz Brothers, and Burton Brewery merged in 1890 to form Paterson Consolidated Brewing Company. Hinchliffe Brewing and Malting Company, founded in 1861, produced 75,000 barrels a year from its state-of-the-art facility at 63 Governor Street. All the breweries closed during Prohibition.

The city was a mecca for immigrant laborers, who worked in its factories, particularly Italian weavers from the Piedmont and Naples regions. Paterson was the site of historic labor unrest that focused on the six-month-long Paterson silk strike of 1913 led by Luigi Galleani and Carlo Tresca that demanded the eight-hour day and better working conditions. It was defeated, with workers returning at the end of the strike without having negotiated any changes.

In 1919, Paterson was one of eight locations bombed by self-identified anarchists.

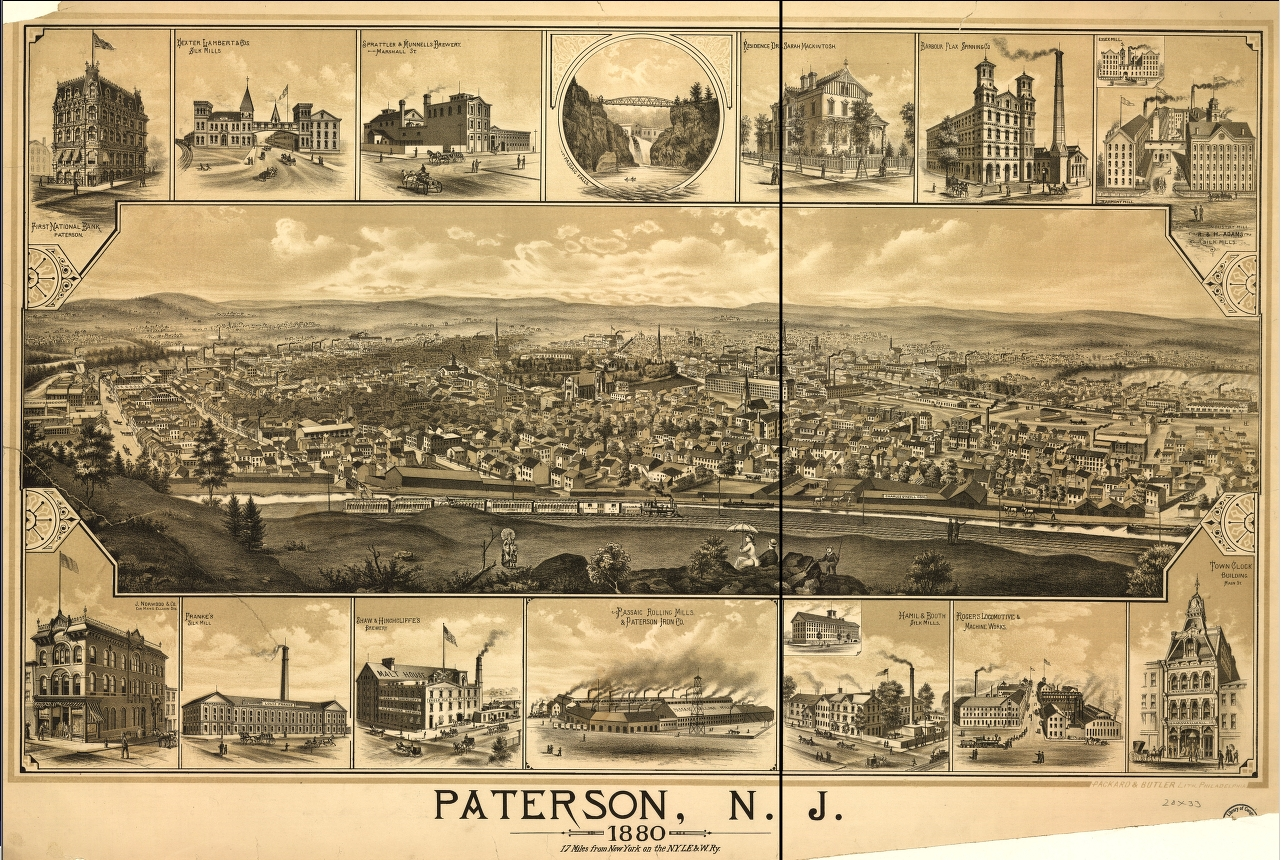
A view of Paterson c. 1880

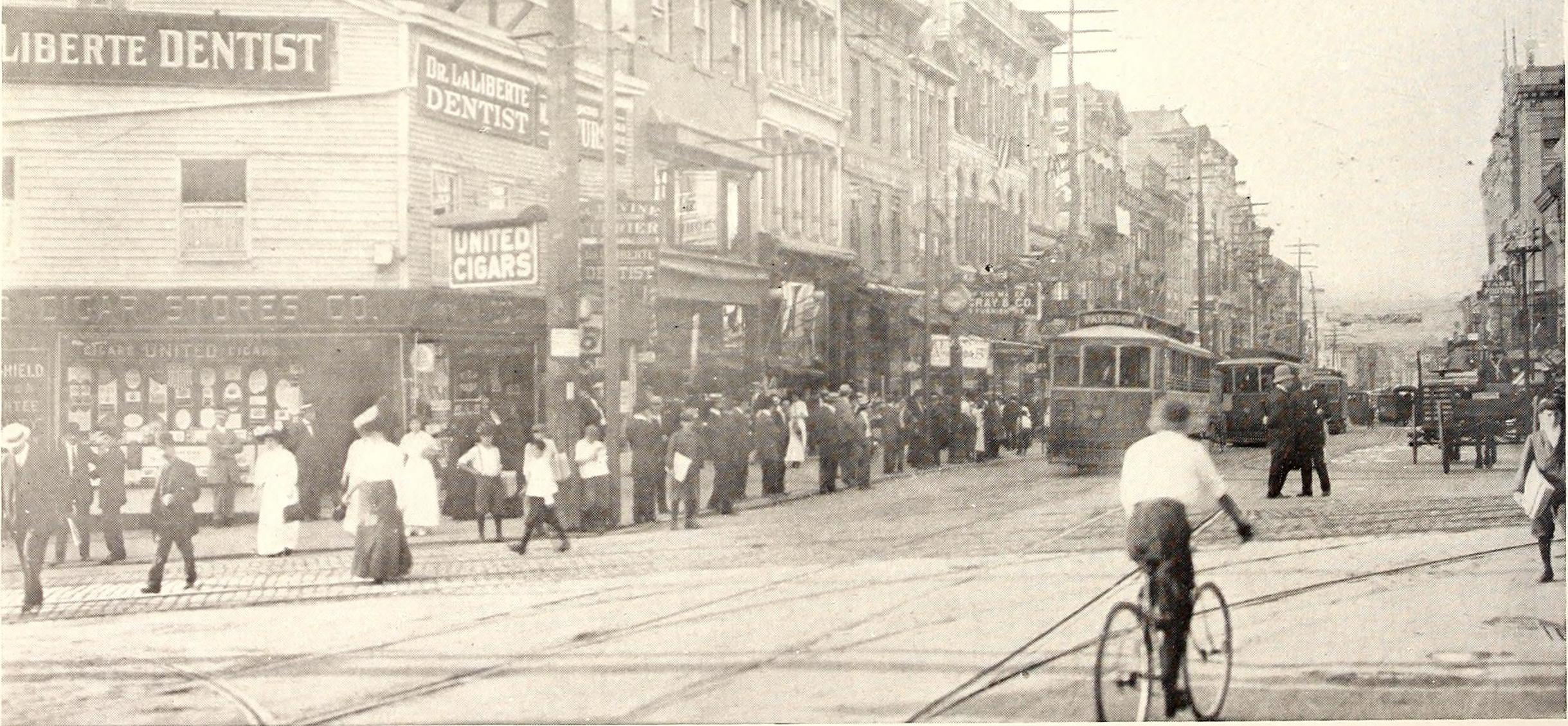
The central business district of Paterson at the intersection of Market and Main Streets, 1911

=== Post–World War II era ===
During World War II, Paterson played an important part in the aircraft engine industry. By the end of the war, however, urban areas were in decline; Paterson was no exception. Beginning in the late 1960s, the city suffered high unemployment rates and white flight.

According to the New Jersey Historical Commission, Paterson's industrialism ended “as the economy and technological needs of the United States changed. By 1983, Paterson was the fifth poorest city in the United States. The town that had called itself Silk City, the Iron City, and the Cotton City, was in economic ruin”. Once millwork and production left the city, Paterson's poverty became reminiscent of what occurred in the towns surrounding the Appalachian Mountains once the coal mining industry ended. In 2020, 25.2% of Paterson residents lived in poverty.

Competition from malls in upscale neighboring towns like Wayne and Paramus forced large chain stores out of Paterson's downtown. With the decline of the city's industrial base, small businesses became the city's most prominent businesses. But the city still attracts many immigrants, who have revived its economy, especially through small businesses.

The downtown area has been struck by massive fires several times, most recently on January 17, 1991. In this fire, almost an entire city block was engulfed in flames due to an electrical fire in the basement of a bar at 161 Main Street. Firefighter John A. Nicosia lost his life in the fire. A plaque honoring his memory was later placed on a wall near the area. The area was so badly damaged that most of the burned buildings were demolished, with an outdoor mall standing in their place. The most notable of the destroyed buildings was the Meyer Brothers department store, which closed in 1987 and had since been parceled out.

Paterson includes numerous locations listed on the National Register of Historic Places, including museums, civic buildings such as City Hall, Hinchliffe Stadium, Public School Number Two and the Danforth Memorial Library, churches (Cathedral of St. John the Baptist and St. Michael's Roman Catholic Church), individual residences, such as Lambert Castle, and districts of the city, such as the Paterson Downtown Commercial Historic District, the Great Falls/Society for the Establishment of Useful Manufactures Historic District and the Eastside Park Historic District.

In August 2011, Paterson was severely affected in the aftermath of Hurricane Irene, particularly by flooding of the Passaic River, where waters rose to levels unseen for 100 years, leading to the displacement of thousands and the closure of bridges over the river. Touring the area with Federal Emergency Management Agency Administrator Craig Fugate, U.S. Homeland Security Secretary Janet Napolitano declared, "This is as bad as I've seen, and I've been in eight states that have been impacted by Irene." The same day, President Obama declared New Jersey a disaster area.

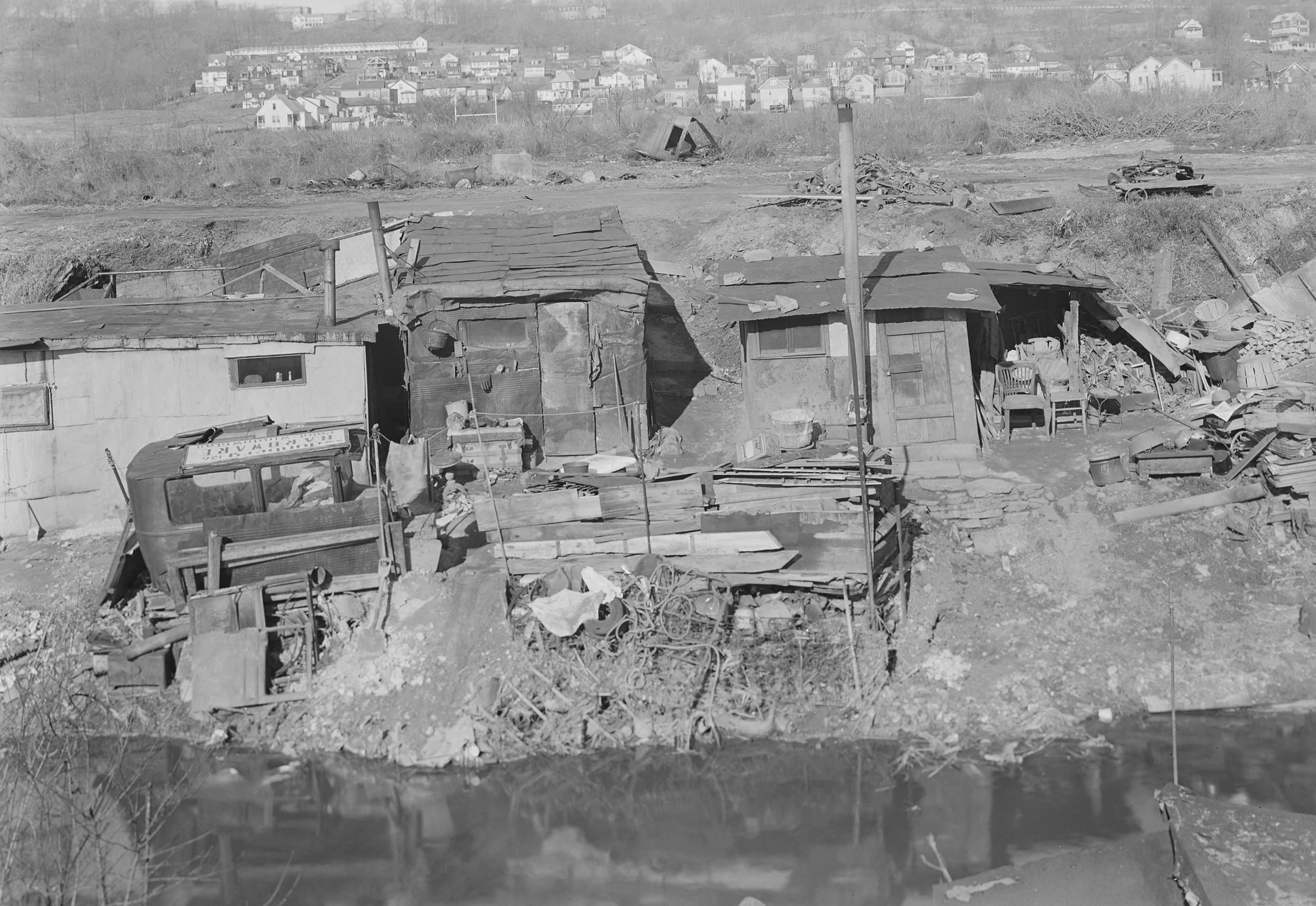
A Hooverville for the unemployed on the outskirts of Paterson, 1937

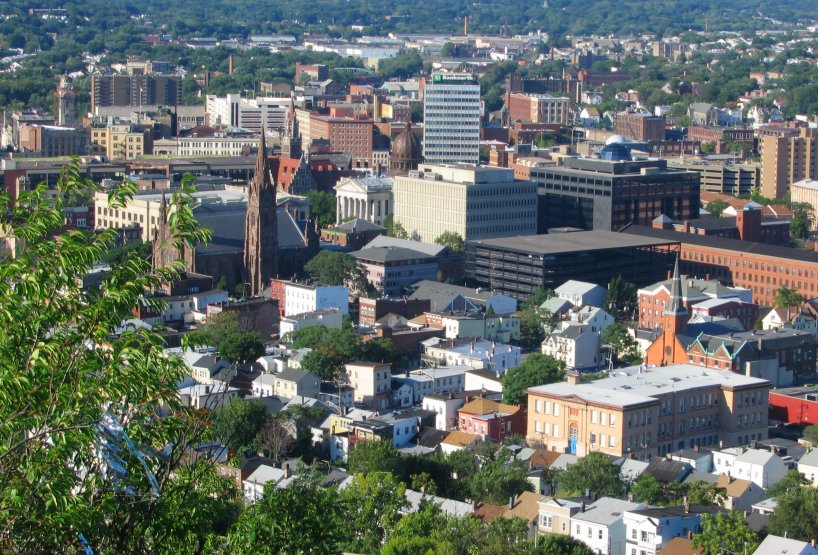
Downtown, Paterson, New Jersey

== Geography ==
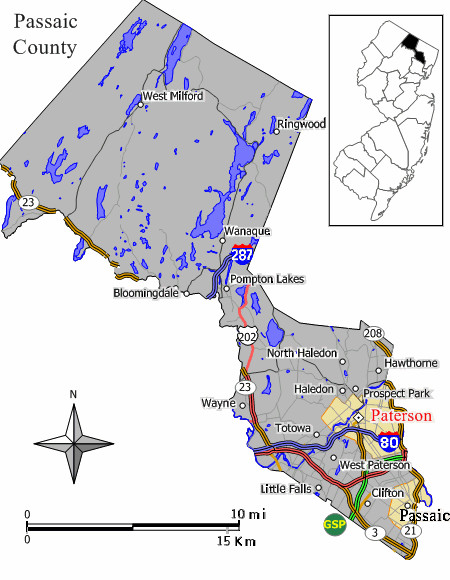
Map of Passaic County, with Paterson, showing major roads and bodies of water

Paterson is in the southern part of Passaic County, which is near the northern edge of New Jersey, as a county that spans some hilly areas and has dozens of lakes. The county covers a region about 30 × 20 miles wide (48 × 32 km). The region is split by major roads, including portions of Interstate 80, which runs through Paterson (see map at left). The Garden State Parkway cuts across the south of Paterson, near Clifton. The Passaic River winds northeast past Totowa into Paterson, where the river then turns south to Passaic town, on the way to Newark, further south.

According to the U.S. Census Bureau, the city had a total area of 8.71 square miles (22.55 km^{2}), including 8.41 square miles (21.79 km^{2}) of land and 0.29 square miles (0.76 km^{2}) of water (3.38%).

Unincorporated communities, localities and place names located partially or completely within the city include Riverside and Totowa.

The city borders the municipalities of Clifton, Haledon, Hawthorne, Prospect Park, Totowa and Woodland Park (formerly West Paterson) in Passaic County; and both Elmwood Park (formerly East Paterson) and Fair Lawn in Bergen County.

=== Downtown Paterson ===
Downtown Paterson is the main commercial district of the city and was once a shopping destination for many who lived in North Jersey. After a devastating fire in 1902, the city rebuilt the downtown with massive Beaux-Arts-style buildings, many of which remain to this day. These buildings are usually four to seven stories tall. Downtown Paterson is home to Paterson City Hall and the Passaic County Courthouse Annex, two of the city's architectural landmarks. City Hall was designed by the New York firm Carrere and Hastings in 1894, and was modeled after the Hôtel de Ville (city hall) in Lyon, France, capital of the silk industry in Europe.

The former Orpheum Theatre located on Van Houten Street has been converted to a mosque by the Islamic Foundation of New Jersey. The massive structure, now known as Masjid Jalalabad, can accommodate 1,500 worshipers.

As with many other old downtown districts in the United States, Downtown Paterson suffered as shoppers and retailers moved to the suburban shopping malls of the region. Many historic buildings are in disrepair or are abandoned after years of neglect. In addition, Downtown Paterson is an Urban Enterprise Zone. The city has, in recent years, begun initiatives in hopes of reviving the downtown area with the centerpiece being the Center City Mall, constructed on a large parking lot spanning Ward Street from Main to Church Streets and features retail, entertainment, and commercial space. Downtown Paterson is located in the city's 1st Ward.

=== Eastside Park ===
Eastside Park Historic District consists of about 1,000 homes in a variety of architectural styles, including Tudors, Georgian colonials, Victorians, Italianate villas and Dutch colonials. It is located east of downtown. Once the home of the city's industrial and political leaders, the neighborhood experienced a significant downturn as industry fled Paterson. In recent years, gentrification has begun to occur in the neighborhood and some of the area's historic houses have been restored.

The Eastside Park Historic District is a state and nationally registered historic place. The jewel of the neighborhood is Eastside Park and the mansions that surround it. This section of Paterson once had a large Jewish population that reached 40,000 at its peak; a synagogue still remains. Eastside Park and what is commonly known as the Upper Eastside are located in Paterson's 3rd Ward.

=== East River ===
East River Section is a section that is referred to by locals roughly bordering Riverside at 5th Avenue and extending south to Broadway, sandwiched in by Madison Avenue to McClean Boulevard (Route 20). However, the neighborhood's layout unofficially extends to the "Paterson-Newark/Hudson Route" of River Road in the Paterson-Memorial Park section of Fair Lawn whose house addresses are in alignment with the now-defunct Jewish synagogue on the corner of 33rd Street and Broadway, which connects Paterson to Newark/Hudson, and at one time was the main route through River Drive, which starts in Elmwood Park and rides north to south along the East Bank of the Passaic River in Paterson's original county.

Built when Paterson was still Bergen County, River Drive changes to River Road in the greater Eastside Sections of Upper Eastside-Manor Section, East River, and Riverside Sections, and turns into Wagaraw Road north of 1st Avenue / Maple Avenue in the old Bunker Hill extension of Columbia Heights in Fair Lawn an indication of not only entering the Industrial Section but also entering the foothills of the Ramapo Mountains in Hawthorne.

River Drive then turns into East Main Street to indicate that you have entered the Northside Section. The East River neighborhood which was and still maintains its "blue-collar" working-class identity, was at one time known for its large Jewish community, as well as a Neapolitan/Italian population and more recently other Mediterranean and Adriatic Europeans, Caribbean and South Americans, and other modern immigrant groups from all over the world, as well as African-Americans.

=== Manor Section ===
Manor Section is a residential neighborhood in Paterson. It is located east of East 33rd Street, north of Broadway, and southwest of Route 20 and the Passaic River. The Manor section of Paterson is located in the city's 3rd Ward. The layout and culture of the Manor Section also extends into the neighboring Lyncrest and Rivercrest sections of Fair Lawn, with all the addresses aligning themselves to the now-defunct Jewish Temple, located at the corner of 33rd and Broadway.

=== South Paterson ===
South Paterson, also known as Little Istanbul or Little Ramallah, is a diverse neighborhood with a growing number of immigrants from the Middle East, with significant Turkish and Arab communities. The neighborhood is located in the 6th Ward, east of Main Street and west of West Railway Avenue. A majority of the city's Arabs live in this section of Paterson. Many of the retail shops and restaurants cater to this community. The neighborhood is characterized by Halal meat markets which offer goat and lamb, and shop signs are in Arabic. South Paterson's Arab community is mostly made up of Jordanians, Palestinians, Syrians, and Lebanese.

=== Lakeview ===
Lakeview is situated in the southern part of the city, and is a middle-class neighborhood. Interstate 80 runs north of this district. Lakeview is home to the Paterson Farmers Market, where many people from across North Jersey come to buy fresh produce. The neighborhood is roughly 65% Hispanic, although it also has a significant Filipino presence. Lakeview also shares some of the same characteristics as neighboring Clifton as they both share a neighborhood bearing the same name. The Lakeview section of Paterson is located in the city's 6th ward.

=== Hillcrest ===
Hillcrest is a largely residential, middle-class enclave, to the west of the downtown area. Its borders are Preakness Avenue to the east, Cumberland Avenue to the west, and Totowa Avenue along with West Side Park and the Passaic River to the south. The neighborhood is very diverse having significant Italian, Arab, and Asian populations. The Hillcrest section of Paterson is located in the city's 2nd Ward.

=== People's Park ===
People's Park is a neighborhood located north of 23rd Avenue and south of Market Street. Twenty-First Avenue, or "La Veinte y uno", as it is known by most of Paterson's Spanish-speaking community, is located in the People's Park section of Paterson. It is an active and vibrant retail strip featuring a variety of shops and services catering to a diverse clientele. Twenty-First Avenue used to have a large Italian population. Although there is still a significant Italian presence left in the neighborhood, it also has a large first-generation Hispanic population, particularly Colombian.

=== Wrigley Park ===
Wrigley Park is a neighborhood that has suffered from years of poverty, crime, and neglect. It is mostly African-American. Poverty, crime, open-air drug markets, prostitution, vacant lots, and boarded-up windows are all common in this area. However, new houses are being built, and crime has dropped in recent years. This neighborhood is located north of Broadway. It is also known as the '4th Ward'. It was named for a Paterson paper manufacturing family.

=== Sandy Hill ===
Sandy Hill is a neighborhood in the Eastside located roughly west of Madison Avenue, north of 21st Avenue, south of Park Avenue, and east of Straight Street. Due to Paterson's significant population turn-over, this neighborhood is now home to a large and growing Hispanic community, mostly first-generation Dominicans. The Sandy Hill section of Paterson is located in the city's 5th Ward. Roberto Clemente Park, which was originally known as Sandy Hill Park, is located in this neighborhood.

Part of the 5th Ward is called Near Eastside by residents to differentiate it from the Eastside Park Historic District to its immediate east.

=== Northside ===
Northside, located north of Downtown, suffers from many of the social problems facing the Wrigley Park neighborhood, but to a lesser extent. This neighborhood borders the boroughs of Haledon and Prospect Park and is known for its hills and sweeping views of the New York City skyline. The Northside section of Paterson is located in the city's 1st Ward.

=== Totowa Section ===
Totowa Section is a large neighborhood located west of the Passaic River, southwest of West Broadway and northeast of Preakness Avenue. As the name implies, it borders the town of Totowa. It is mostly Hispanic but with an increasing South Asian community, mainly Bangladeshi. Many Bengali grocery and clothing stores are located on Union Avenue and the surrounding streets. Masjid Al-Ferdous is located on Union Avenue, which accommodates the daily Bangladeshi pedestrian population.

A large Italian presence remains in this neighborhood. Many Peruvian and other Latin American restaurants and businesses are located on Union Avenue. Colonial Village and Brooks Sloate Terraces are located in this neighborhood. The Totowa Section is located in parts of the 1st and 2nd Wards of Paterson.

=== Stoney Road ===
Stoney Road is Paterson's southwesternmost neighborhood, bordering Woodland Park to the south and Totowa across the Passaic River to the west. This neighborhood is home to Pennington Park, Hayden Heights, Lou Costello Pool, the Levine reservoir, Murray Avenue, Mc Bride Avenue, Great Falls (Passaic River) and Garret Heights. The Stoney Road section of Paterson is located in the city's 2nd Ward. It also contains the Great Falls, which is a national historic park.

=== Riverside ===
Riverside is a larger neighborhood in Paterson and, as its name suggests, is bound by the Passaic River to the north and east, separating the city from Hawthorne and Fair Lawn. Riverside is a working-class neighborhood. The neighborhood is mostly residential with some industrial uses. Madison Avenue cuts through the heart of this district. Route 20 runs through the eastern border of Riverside, providing an easy commute to Route 80 East and New York City. This section is ethnically diverse with a growing Hispanic community concentrating mostly north and along River Street. Many Albanians make their home in the East 18th Street and River Street areas. River View Terrace is located in this neighborhood. Riverside is located in parts of the 3rd and 4th Wards of Paterson.

=== Bunker Hill ===
Bunker Hill is a mostly industrial area west of River Street and east of the Passaic River.

=== Westside Park ===
Westside Park is located off Totowa Avenue and is best known as the site of the Holland submarine, Fenian Ram, which was built from 1879 to 1881 for the Fenian Brotherhood. It became the target of graffiti artists because the fence surrounding it was too low and too close to the submarine itself. The sub is now located in Paterson Museum. The local Bangladeshi community commemorates International Mother Language Day at a shaheed minar (martyr's monument) built in the park in 2015.

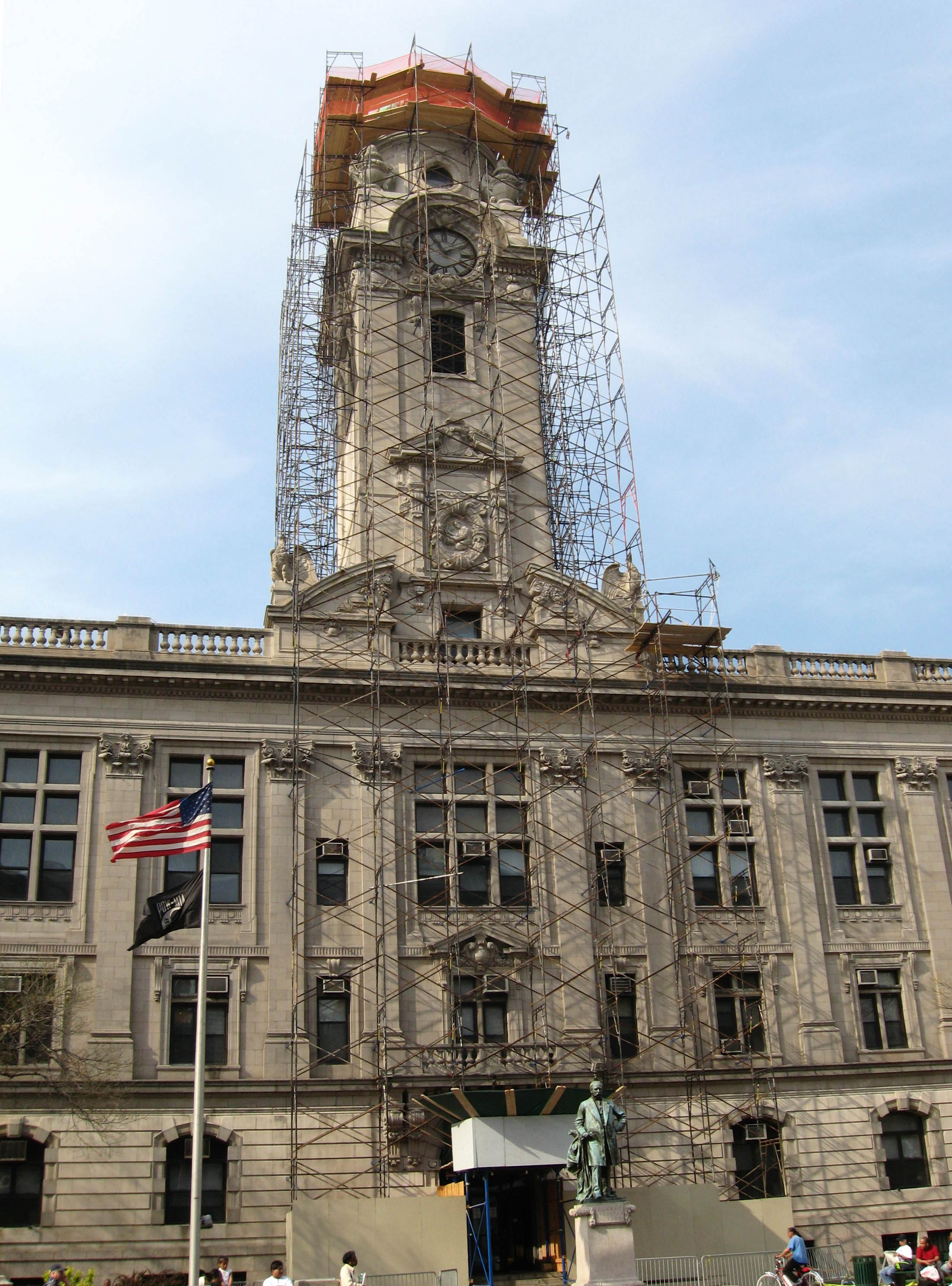
Paterson City Hall, April 2008

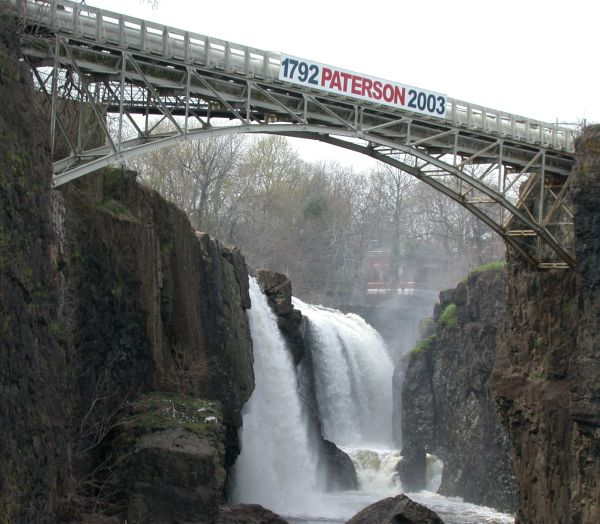
The Great Falls of the Passaic River in Paterson

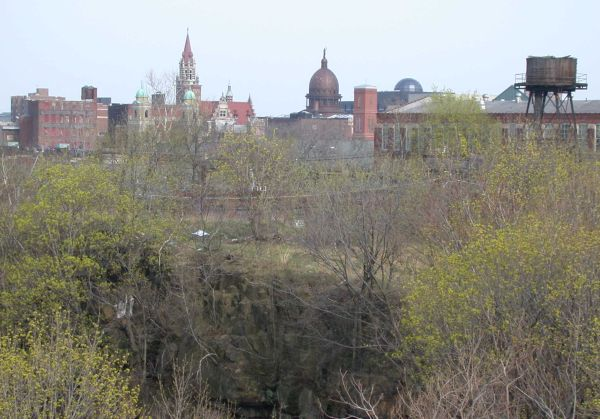
Paterson's skyline, showing the canyon of the Passaic River in the foreground. The area along the river was formerly the site of most of the mills that flourished throughout Paterson's history.

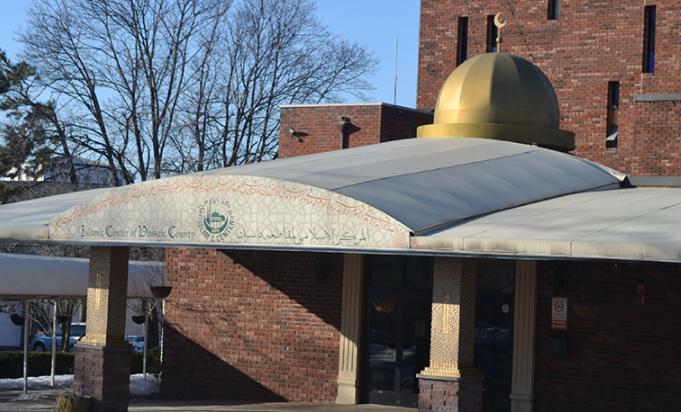
The Islamic Center of Passaic County in Paterson

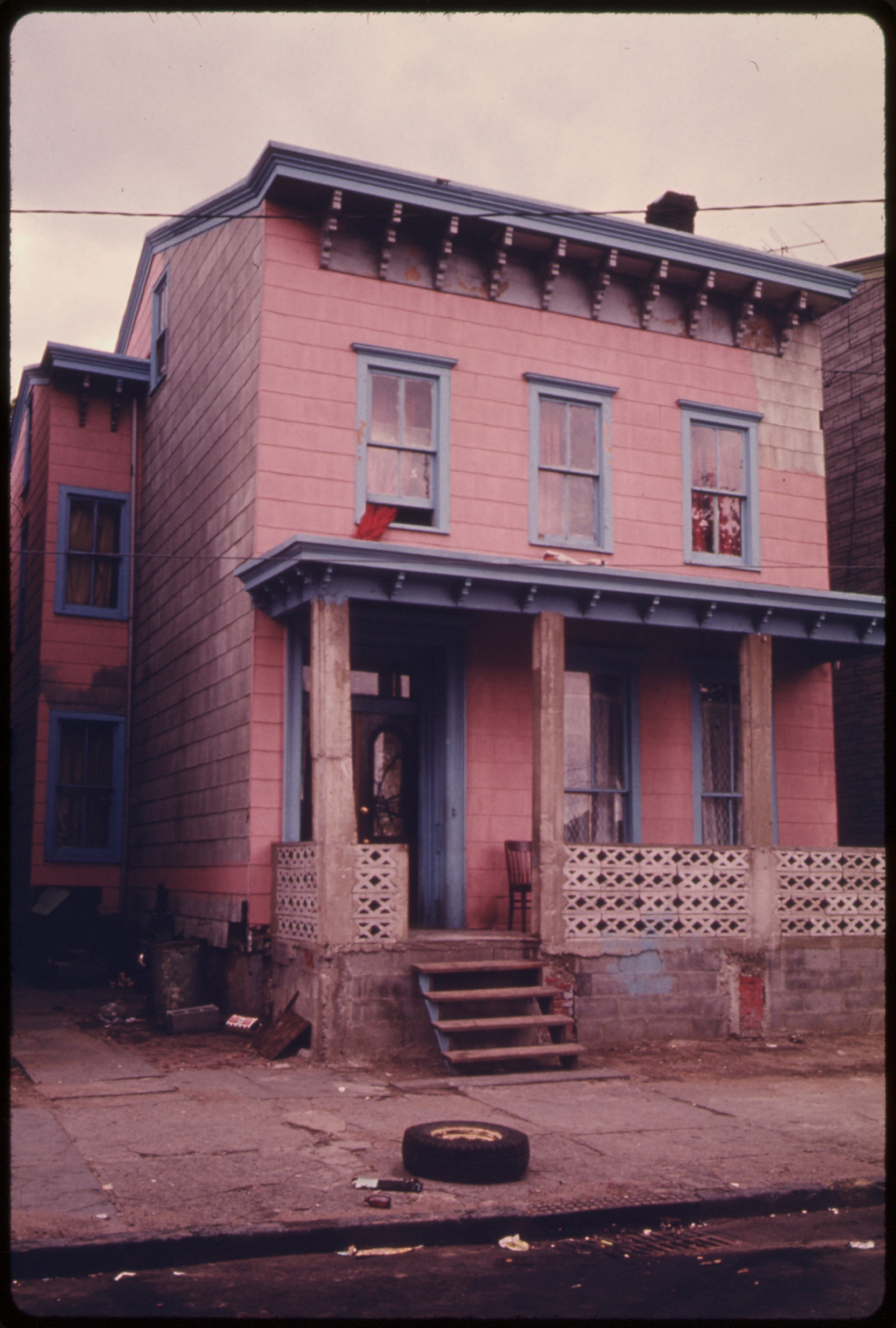
House in Paterson's inner city, 1974

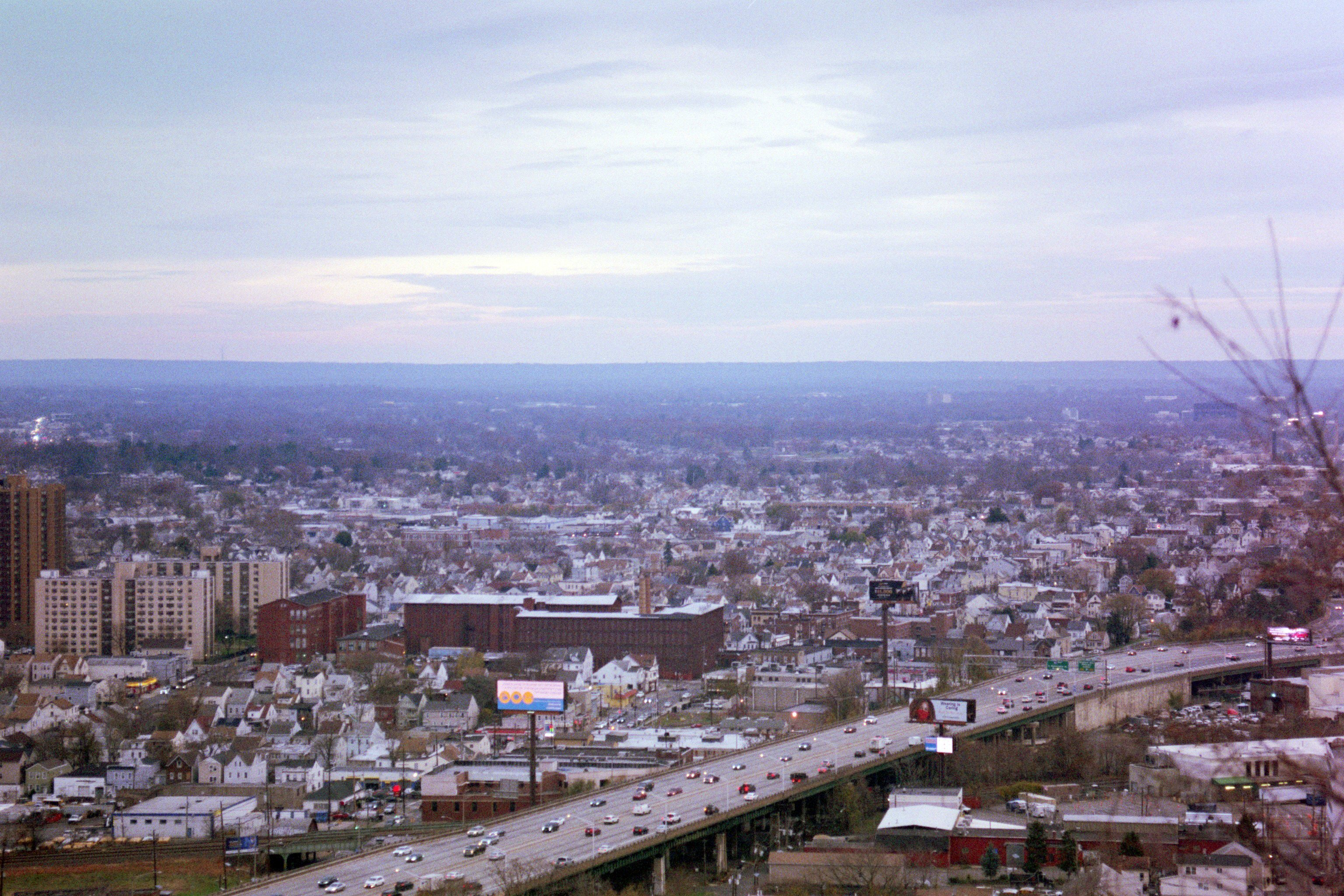
Interstate 80 and the east side of Paterson from the Garrett Mountain Reservation

=== Climate ===
The climate in this area is characterized by hot, humid summers and generally cool to cold winters. According to the Köppen Climate Classification system, Paterson has a humid subtropical climate, abbreviated Cfa on climate maps. Despite the size of the city, it has no weather reporting station, and thus, no historical climate data. Paterson uses Newark's airport for its local weather.

== Demographics ==
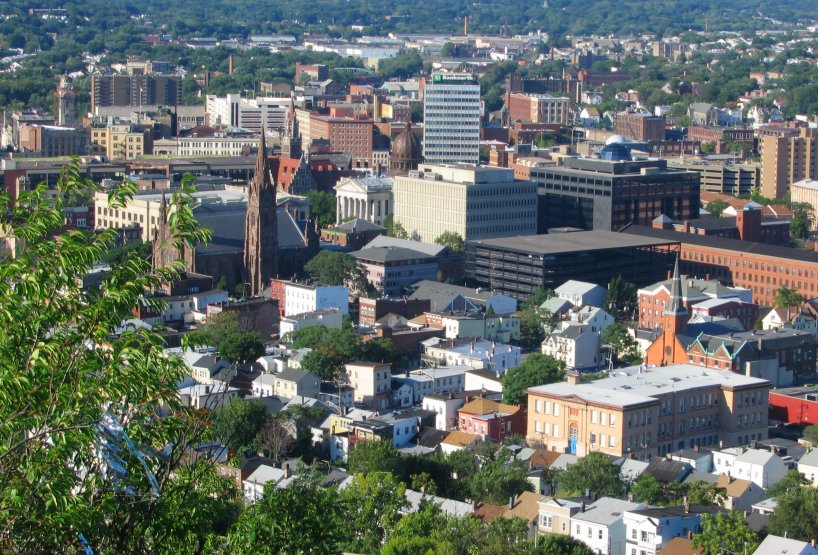
Downtown Paterson, pictured June 2009

Historical population
| Census | Pop. | Note | %± |
|---|---|---|---|
| 1840 | 7,596 | | — |
| 1850 | 11,334 | | 49.2% |
| 1860 | 19,586 | | 72.8% |
| 1870 | 33,579 | | 71.4% |
| 1880 | 51,031 | | 52.0% |
| 1890 | 78,347 | | 53.5% |
| 1900 | 105,171 | | 34.2% |
| 1910 | 125,600 | | 19.4% |
| 1920 | 135,875 | | 8.2% |
| 1930 | 138,513 | | 1.9% |
| 1940 | 139,656 | | 0.8% |
| 1950 | 139,336 | | −0.2% |
| 1960 | 143,663 | | 3.1% |
| 1970 | 144,824 | | 0.8% |
| 1980 | 137,970 | | −4.7% |
| 1990 | 140,891 | | 2.1% |
| 2000 | 149,222 | | 5.9% |
| 2010 | 146,199 | | −2.0% |
| 2020 | 159,732 | | 9.3% |
| 2025 (est.) | 161,793 | | 1.3% |
Population sources: 1800–1920 1840–1900; 1840–1870 1840 1850; 1870 1880–1890; 1890–1910 1860–1930; 1940–2000 2000; 2010 2020

According to then-Mayor Jose Torres, Paterson had 52 distinct ethnic groups in 2014. By 2020, Paterson had the second-largest Muslim population in the United States by percentage. Paterson's rapidly growing Bangladeshi American, Turkish American, Arab American, Albanian American, Bosnian American, Dominican American, and Peruvian American communities are among the largest and most prominent in the United States, the latter owing partially to the presence of the Consulate of Peru. Paterson's Muslim population has been estimated at 25,000 to 30,000. Paterson has become a prime destination for one of the fastest-growing communities of Dominican Americans, who have become the city's largest ethnic group. The Puerto Rican population has established a highly significant presence as well.

=== 2020 census ===
Paterson, New Jersey – Racial and ethnic composition Note: the US Census treats Hispanic/Latino as an ethnic category. This table excludes Latinos from the racial categories and assigns them to a separate category. Hispanics/Latinos may be of any race.
| Race / Ethnicity (NH = Non-Hispanic) | Pop 1990 | Pop 2000 | Pop 2010 | Pop 2020 | % 1990 | % 2000 | % 2010 | % 2020 |
|---|---|---|---|---|---|---|---|---|
| White alone (NH) | 34,571 | 19,765 | 13,426 | 12,523 | 24.54% | 13.25% | 9.18% | 7.84% |
| Black or African American alone (NH) | 46,100 | 46,882 | 41,431 | 36,667 | 32.72% | 31.42% | 28.34% | 22.96% |
| Native American or Alaska Native alone (NH) | 225 | 242 | 217 | 186 | 0.16% | 0.16% | 0.15% | 0.12% |
| Asian alone (NH) | 1,754 | 2,728 | 4,663 | 7,991 | 1.24% | 1.83% | 3.19% | 5.00% |
| Pacific Islander alone (NH) | N/A | 56 | 21 | 17 | N/A | 0.04% | 0.01% | 0.01% |
| Other race alone (NH) | 530 | 496 | 437 | 1,260 | 0.38% | 0.33% | 0.30% | 0.79% |
| Mixed race or Multiracial (NH) | N/A | 4,279 | 1,750 | 2,225 | N/A | 2.87% | 1.20% | 1.39% |
| Hispanic or Latino (any race) | 57,711 | 74,774 | 84,254 | 98,863 | 40.96% | 50.11% | 57.63% | 61.89% |
| Total | 140,891 | 149,222 | 146,199 | 159,732 | 100.00% | 100.00% | 100.00% | 100.00% |

=== 2010 census ===
The 2010 United States census counted 146,199 people, 44,329 households, and 32,715 families in the city. The population density was 17,346.3 per square mile (6,697.4/km^{2}). There were 47,946 housing units at an average density of 5,688.7 per square mile (2,196.4/km^{2}). The racial makeup was 34.68% (50,706) White, 31.68% (46,314) Black or African American, 1.06% (1,547) Native American, 3.34% (4,878) Asian, 0.04% (60) Pacific Islander, 23.94% (34,999) from other races, and 5.26% (7,695) from two or more races. Hispanic or Latino of any race were 57.63% (84,254) of the population.

Of the 44,329 households, 38.7% had children under the age of 18; 35.4% were married couples living together; 29.5% had a female householder with no husband present and 26.2% were non-families. Of all households, 21.0% were made up of individuals and 7.6% had someone living alone who was 65 years of age or older. The average household size was 3.24 and the average family size was 3.71.

27.9% of the population were under the age of 18, 11.4% from 18 to 24, 29.0% from 25 to 44, 22.9% from 45 to 64, and 8.9% who were 65 years of age or older. The median age was 32.1 years. For every 100 females, the population had 93.6 males. For every 100 females ages 18 and older there were 89.9 males.

Same-sex couples headed 290 households in 2010, a decline from the 349 counted in 2000.

The Census Bureau's 2006–2010 American Community Survey showed that (in 2010 inflation-adjusted dollars) median household income was $34,086 (with a margin of error of ±$1,705) and the median family income was $39,003 (±$2,408). Males had a median income of $30,811 (±$825) versus $28,459 (±$1,570) for females. The per capita income for the city was $15,543 (±$467). About 24.1% of families and 26.6% of the population were below the poverty line, including 39.0% of those under age 18 and 25.4% of those age 65 or over.

=== 2000 census ===
As of the 2000 United States census, there were 149,222 people, 44,710 households, and 33,353 families residing in the city, for a population density of 17,675.4 per square mile (6,826.4/km^{2}). Among cities with a population higher than 100,000, Paterson was the second most densely populated large city in the United States, only after New York City.

There were 47,169 housing units at an average density of 5,587.2 per square mile (2,157.2/km^{2}). The racial makeup of the city was 32.90% African American, 13.20% White, 0.60% Native American, 1.90% Asian, 0.06% Pacific Islander, 27.60% from other races and 6.17% from two or more races. Latino people of any race were 50.1% of the population. The majority of Latinos are Puerto Rican 14%, Dominican 10%, Peruvian 5% and Colombian 3%.

There were 44,710 households, out of which 40.9% had children under the age of 18 living with them, 39.4% were married couples living together, 26.8% had a female householder with no husband present, and 25.4% were non-families. 20.4% of all households were made up of individuals, and 7.9% had someone living alone who was 65 years of age or older. The average household size was 3.25 and the average family size was 3.71.

In the city, the population was spread out, with 29.8% under the age of 18, 11.2% from 18 to 24, 32.0% from 25 to 44, 18.7% from 45 to 64, and 8.3% who were 65 years of age or older. The median age was 30 years. For every 100 females, there were 94.4 males. For every 100 females age 18 and over, there were 91.1 males.

The median income for a household in the city was $30,127, and the median income for a family was $32,983. Males had a median income of $27,911 versus $21,733 for females. The per capita income for the city was $13,257. About 19.2% of families and 22.2% of the population were below the poverty line, including 29.0% of those under age 18 and 19.4% of those age 65 or over.

=== Ethnic groups ===
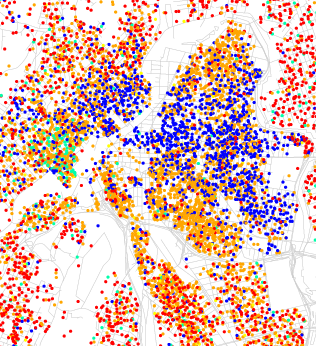
A map showing the diversity of Paterson's population, 2010

Waves of Irish, Germans, Dutch, and Jews settled in the city in the 19th century. Italian and Eastern Europe immigrants soon followed. Syrian immigrants arrived in Paterson during the early part of the 19th century; members of the community would own dozens of silk mills in the city by the year 1900.

In a book called The Shortest History of Migration, the economist Ian Goldin explains the concept of chain migration or network migration by noting that 90% of Dutch migrants from South Holland to the United States settled in three American towns, one of which was Paterson.

In addition to many African Americans of Southern heritage, more recent immigrants have come from the Caribbean and Africa. Paterson's black population increased during the Great Migration of the 20th century, but there have been Patersonians of African descent since before the Civil War. However, Paterson's black population declined between the years 2000 and 2010, consistent with the overall return migration of African Americans from northern New Jersey back to the Southern United States. A house once existing at Bridge Street and Broadway was a station on the Underground Railroad. It was operated from 1855 to 1864 by abolitionists William Van Rensalier, a black engineer, and Josiah Huntoon, a white industrialist. There is a memorial located at the site.

Many second- and third-generation Puerto Ricans have called Paterson home since the 1950s, including an estimated 10,000 who participated in the 2014 mayoral election, which was won by Jose "Joey" Torres, a Puerto Rican American who was one of three Hispanic candidates vying for the seat. Today's Hispanic immigrants to Paterson are primarily Dominican, Peruvian, Colombian, Mexican, and Central American, with a resurgence of Puerto Rican migration as well. In 2014, more than 600 business people attended the annual Statewide Hispanic Chamber of Commerce of New Jersey Convention in Paterson.

Western Market Street, sometimes called Little Lima by tourists, is home to many Peruvian and other Latin-American businesses. In contrast, if one travels east on Market Street, a heavy concentration of Dominican-owned restaurants, beauty salons, barbershops, and other businesses can be seen. The Great Falls Historic District, Cianci Street, Union Avenue, and 21st Avenue have several Italian businesses. To the north of the Great Falls is a fast-growing Bangladeshi population. Park Avenue and Market Street between Straight Street and Madison Avenue are heavily Dominican and Puerto Rican.

Main Street, just south of downtown, is heavily Mexican with a resurgent Puerto Rican community. Broadway, also called Dr. Martin Luther King Jr. Way, is significantly black, as are the Fourth Ward and parts of Eastside and Northside, although Paterson's African American population is declining. Costa Ricans and other Central American immigrant communities are growing in the Riverside and Peoples Park neighborhoods. Main Street between the Clifton border and Madison Avenue is heavily Turkish and Arab. 21st Avenue in the People's Park section is characterized by Colombian and other Latin American restaurants and shops. According to a Colombian newspaper, since 2022, Paterson has become the home of almost 200 Colombian immigrants from Manatí, a small town in Colombia.

Every summer, Patersonians conduct an African American Day Parade, a Dominican Day Parade, a Puerto Rican Day Parade, a Peruvian Day Parade, and a Turkish-American Day Parade; budget cuts in 2011 have forced parade organizers to contribute to cover the costs of police and other municipal services.

Paterson is widely considered the capital of the Peruvian diaspora in the U.S. Little Lima, a Peruvian enclave in Downtown Paterson, is the largest Peruvian enclave outside of South America, home to approximately 10,000 Peruvian immigrants. Paterson has named an area bordered by Mill, Market, Main, and Cianci streets "Peru Square". Paterson's rapidly growing Peruvian community celebrates what is known as Señor de los Milagros ("Our Lord of Miracles" in English) on October 18 through 28th each year and every July participates in the annual Passaic County Peruvian Day Parade, which passes through Market Street and Main Street in the Little Lima neighborhood of Downtown Paterson. In the 2000 Census, 4.72% of residents listed themselves as being of Peruvian American ancestry, the third-highest percentage of the population of any municipality in New Jersey and the United States, behind East Newark with 10.1% and Harrison with 7.01%. The community includes both Quechua and Spanish speakers.

Paterson is home to the third-largest Dominican-American Community in the United States, after New York City and Lawrence, Massachusetts. In the 2000 Census, 10.27% of residents listed themselves as being of Dominican American ancestry, the eighth highest percentage of the population of any municipality in the United States and the third-highest percentage in New Jersey, behind Perth Amboy's 18.81% and Union City's 11.46%. Paterson renamed a section of Park Avenue in Sandy Hill to Dominican Republic Way to recognize the Dominican community, which is the largest Hispanic community in the city.

Paterson is home to the largest Turkish-American immigrant community in the United States (known as Little Istanbul) and the second largest Arab-American community after Dearborn, Michigan. Paterson has been also nicknamed Little Palestine and contains a neighborhood with the same name in South Paterson, with an Arab American population estimated as high as 20,000 in 2015, serving as the center of Paterson's growing Syrian American and Palestinian American populations. The Paterson-based Arab American Civic Association was reported in 2014 to have an Arabic language program in the Paterson Public Schools that served 125 students at School 9 on Saturdays. Paterson is also home to the largest Circassian immigrant community in the United States.

The Greater Paterson area, which includes the cities of Clifton and Wayne and the boroughs of Haledon, Prospect Park, North Haledon, Totowa, Woodland Park, and Little Falls, is home to the nation's largest North Caucasian population, mostly Circassians, Karachays, and small Chechen and Dagestani communities. Reflective of these communities, Paterson and Prospect Park public schools observe Muslim holidays.

Paterson has incorporated a rapidly growing Bangladeshi American community, which was estimated in 2024 to number 15,000, the largest in the United States outside New York City. Mohammed Akhtaruzzaman was ultimately certified as the winner of the 2012 city council race in the Second Ward, making him North Jersey's first Bangladeshi-American elected official.

== Economy ==
Portions of the city are part of an Urban Enterprise Zone (UEZ), one of 32 zones covering 37 municipalities statewide. The city was selected in 1994 as one of a group of 10 zones added to participate in the program. In addition to other benefits to encourage employment within the UEZ, shoppers can take advantage of a reduced 3.3125% sales tax rate (half of the 6 5/8% rate charged statewide) at eligible merchants. Established in September 1994, the city's Urban Enterprise Zone status expires in September 2025. The UEZ program plays a pivotal role in the city's economic revitalization.

== Arts and culture ==
The Paterson Literary Review has been published annually by the Poetry Center at Passaic County Community College, and edited by Maria Mazziotti Gillan, since 1979. Though it also includes prose and reviews, PLR is most well known for its submitted poetry — having published works by notable poets such as Allen Ginsberg, Philip Levine, William Stafford, and Sonia Sanchez.

Since 2018, Paterson has hosted an annual Paterson Poetry Festival, which includes poetry performances from rising and established artists, workshops, panels, open mics, and contests like a slam face-off. From 2018 through 2022, the festival was held on the stairs of the Passaic County Court House in downtown Paterson; in 2023, the festival was held at the amphitheater in Woodland Park's Rifle Camp Park.

Paterson has a significant parks and recreation system, including larger areas such as Eastside, Westside, and Pennington Parks, as well as neighborhood parks such as Wrigley, Robert Clemente, and People's. The Great Falls of the Passaic are part of the national park system.

The Paterson Museum, in the Great Falls Historic District, was founded in 1925 and is owned and operated by the city of Paterson. Its mission is to preserve and display the industrial history of the city. Since 1982, the museum has been housed in the Thomas Rogers Building on Market Street, the former erecting shop of Rogers Locomotive and Machine Works, a major 19th-century manufacturer of railroad steam locomotives.

Belle Vista, locally known as Lambert Castle, was built in 1892 as the home of Catholina Lambert, the self-made owner of a prominent silk mill in Paterson. After Lambert's death in 1923, his family sold the building to the city, which in turn sold it to the County of Passaic a few years later. The county used the building for administrative offices, and in 1936, provided one room to the fledgling Passaic County Historical Society to serve as its historical museum. As time went by the museum grew, room by room until the entire first floor became the historical museum.

In the late 1990s, the Castle underwent a multi-million-dollar restoration and all four floors of the building were developed into a museum and library. Today, Passaic County remains the owner of the building and supports the facilities' operation; however, the Passaic County Historical Society is solely responsible for the operation and management of Lambert Castle Museum with its historical period rooms, long-term and changing exhibition galleries, educational programs for elementary and middle-school students, and research library/archive.

Above Lambert Castle stands a 75-foot (23 m) observation tower, located at the peak of Garret Mountain, which while technically standing in Woodland Park, was constructed when the property was considered part of Paterson. The tower is part of the Garret Mountain Reservation and renovations were completed in 2009 to restore the tower to the original condition as built in 1896 by Lambert, who used the tower to impress guests with its view of the New York City skyline.

Attempts were being made to fund the restoration of the Paterson Armory as a recreation and cultural center, but the building was destroyed by fire before these could bear fruit.

== Athletics ==
From 1932 to 1933, Paterson constructed Hinchliffe Stadium, an Art Deco concrete stadium. Originally called City Stadium, it was renamed in honor of Mayor John V. Hinchliffe and his uncle John Hinchliffe. The New York Black Yankees of the Negro National League played at the stadium from 1933 to 1937 and from 1939 to 1945. Professional football teams, including the Paterson Panthers, Newark Bears, and Jersey City Giants, played here. The stadium was also a venue for other professional and high school athletic competitions, boxing matches, fireworks displays, and music concerts. The comedy team of Bud Abbott and Lou Costello performed at Hinchliffe before boxing matches (Abbott was from the coastal New Jersey city of Asbury Park and Costello was a Paterson native). The stadium was acquired by Paterson Public Schools since 1963 and closed in 1996. It has fallen into disrepair, although preservation and restoration efforts have taken place. The stadium is one of two surviving Negro league baseball stadiums, the other being Birmingham, Alabama's Rickwood Field. Hinchliffe Stadium is listed on the National Register of Historic Places. Since 2023, the stadium is home to the New Jersey Jackals minor league baseball team.

In 2025, it was announced that the New York Cosmos, a new team unconnected to previous teams sharing the name, will play at Hinchliffe Stadium as part of the USL League One starting in 2026.

== Government ==
=== Local government ===
The City of Paterson operates within the Faulkner Act, formally known as the Optional Municipal Charter Law, under a Plan-D Mayor-Council form of government, which was adopted in 1974 in a change from a 1907 statute-based form. The city is one of 71 municipalities (of the 564) statewide that use this form.

Under the Mayor-Council plan, the Mayor is the chief executive and is responsible for administering the city's activities. The Mayor is elected at-large for a four-year term by the citizens and is responsible for them. The mayor enforces the charter and the ordinances and laws passed by the City Council. The Mayor appoints all department heads including the business administrator, with the advice and consent of the council and may remove any department heads after giving them notice and an opportunity to be heard. With the assistance of the business administrator, the Mayor is responsible for the preparation of the municipal budget. The Mayor submits the budget to the Council along with a detailed analysis of expenditures and revenues. The Council may reduce any item or items in the budget by a majority vote but can only increase an item by a two-thirds vote.

The City Council is composed of nine members. Of these, six are elected through the use of the ward system, where candidates run to represent a certain area of the city. The other three seats are elected using the at-large system, where each candidate is voted upon by the entire voting population of the city. Municipal elections are held in even-numbered years, are non-partisan, and take place on the second Tuesday in May. The six members of the City Council representing their wards are elected in the same years as presidential elections, while the mayoral election and the at-large Council elections are held in the same years as the mid-term Congressional elections.

As of 2023, the Mayor of Paterson is Andre Sayegh, whose term of office ends June 30, 2026. The previous mayor was Jane Williams-Warren, who was serving on an interim basis following the resignation of José "Joey" Torres. Torres was in his third non-consecutive term as Mayor of Paterson, having first been elected by defeating incumbent Martin G. Barnes in 2002 and then winning re-election in 2006 against Lawrence Spagnola. After losing his bid for a third consecutive term by a margin of 600 votes to City Council President Jeffery Jones in 2010, Torres defeated Jones in a rematch four years later. Torres pleaded guilty to corruption charges in September 2017 that required him to leave office and to serve a prison term of five years. According to city law, the President of the City Council is the next in line to succeed a Mayor who is removed from office for any reason and serves as Acting Mayor until the next election, unless the Council appoints someone else to fill the post within 30 days of the creation of the vacancy. City Council President Ruby Cotton immediately became Mayor upon Torres' resignation and served until September 29, when the council voted 5–4 to appoint Williams-Warren, a former city clerk, as interim mayor until the May 2018 municipal election.

Members of the City Council are Council President Shahin Khalique (Second Ward; 2024), Council Vice President Alex Mendez (Third Ward; 2024), Alaa "Al" Abdelaziz (Sixth Ward; 2024), Ruby N. Cotton (Fourth Ward; 2024), Maritza Davila (at-large; 2026), Michael Jackson (First Ward; 2024), Lilisa Mimms (at-large; 2026), MD Forid Uddin (at-large; 2026) and Luis Velez (Fifth Ward; 2024).

In July 2018, Alaa "Al" Abdelaziz was selected to fill the Sixth Ward seat expiring in June 2020 that had been held by Andre Sayegh until he stepped down to take office as mayor. In the November 2018 general election, Abdelaziz was elected to serve the balance of the term of office.

In 2018, the city had an average property tax bill of $8,087, the lowest in the county, compared to an average bill of $10,005 in Passaic County and $8,767 statewide.

The 2020 election for Paterson's Third Ward city council was invalidated after allegations of voter fraud vote-by-mail. More than 24% of ballots failed to meet the standard for mail-in ballots.

In March 2025, Mayor Andre Sayegh declared Paterson "the capital of Palestine in the United States."

=== Federal, state and county representation ===
Paterson is located in the 9th Congressional District and is part of New Jersey's 35th state legislative district. Prior to the 2010 Census, Paterson had been part of the 8th Congressional District, a change made by the New Jersey Redistricting Commission that took effect in January 2013, based on the results of the November 2012 general elections.

For the 119th United States Congress, New Jersey's 9th congressional district is represented by Nellie Pou (D, North Haledon) New Jersey is represented in the United States Senate by Democrats Cory Booker (Newark, term ends 2027) and Andy Kim (Moorestown, term ends 2031).

For the 2026–2027 session, the 35th legislative district of the New Jersey Legislature is represented in the State Senate by Benjie Wimberly (D, Paterson) and in the General Assembly by Al Abdelaziz (D, Paterson) and Kenyatta Stewart (D, Paterson).

Passaic County is governed by a Board of County Commissioners, comprised of seven members who are elected at-large to staggered three-year terms office on a partisan basis, with two or three seats coming up for election each year as part of the November general election in a three-year cycle. At a reorganization meeting held in January, the board selects a Director and Deputy Director from among its members to serve for a one-year term. As of 2026, Passaic County's Commissioners are: Director Cassandra "Sandi" Lazzara (D), Little Falls, term as commissioner ends December 31, 2027; term as director ends 2026), Deputy Director Orlando Cruz (D, Paterson, term as commissioner and as deputy director ends 2026), Rodney DeVore (D, Paterson, 2027), Bruce James (D, Clifton, 2026) Michael Ramaglia (D, West Milford, 2028), Christina Schratz (D, Passaic, 2028) and Nick Veliky (D, Clifton, appointed to a term ending in 2027).

Constitutional officers, elected on a countywide basis, are County Clerk Danielle Ireland-Imhof (D, Hawthorne, 2028), Sheriff Thomas Adamo (D, Wayne, 2027) and Surrogate Zoila S. Cassanova (D, Wayne, 2026).

=== Politics ===
Gubernatorial election results for Paterson
| Year | Republican | | Democratic | | Third party(ies) | |
| Year | No. | % | No. | % | No. | % |
|---|---|---|---|---|---|---|
| 2025 | 3,661 | 14.22% | 21,926 | 85.19% | 151 | 0.59% |
| 2021 | 2,437 | 14.35% | 14,376 | 84.65% | 170 | 1.00% |
| 2017 | 1,389 | 7.70% | 16,425 | 91.06% | 223 | 1.24% |
| 2013 | 4,123 | 20.59% | 15,726 | 78.52% | 179 | 0.89% |
| 2009 | 2,213 | 11.10% | 17,334 | 86.93% | 393 | 1.97% |
| 2005 | 2,021 | 9.78% | 17,751 | 85.94% | 883 | 4.27% |

Presidential elections results
| Year | Republican | Democratic | Third Parties |
|---|---|---|---|
| 2024 | 34.2% 13,819 | 62.0% 25,054 | 3.8% 1,500 |
| 2020 | 18.9% 9,053 | 80.3% 38,453 | 0.8% 270 |
| 2016 | 8.8% 3,999 | 89.8% 40,697 | 1.4% 611 |
| 2012 | 6.1% 2,696 | 93.6% 41,662 | 0.3% 152 |
| 2008 | 9.7% 4,098 | 90.0% 38,085 | 0.3% 150 |
| 2004 | 17.1% 5,959 | 82.8% 28,896 | 0.1% 151 |

United States Senate election results for Paterson1
| Year | Republican | | Democratic | | Third party(ies) | |
| Year | No. | % | No. | % | No. | % |
|---|---|---|---|---|---|---|
| 2024 | 9,518 | 27.48% | 23,303 | 67.27% | 1,819 | 5.25% |
| 2018 | 3,098 | 10.04% | 25,541 | 82.74% | 2,231 | 7.23% |
| 2012 | 1,852 | 4.72% | 37,065 | 94.46% | 321 | 0.82% |
| 2006 | 2,212 | 11.50% | 16,773 | 87.20% | 251 | 1.30% |

United States Senate election results for Paterson2
| Year | Republican | | Democratic | | Third party(ies) | |
| Year | No. | % | No. | % | No. | % |
|---|---|---|---|---|---|---|
| 2020 | 5,131 | 11.04% | 39,539 | 85.04% | 1,826 | 3.93% |
| 2014 | 1,273 | 7.11% | 16,437 | 91.74% | 206 | 1.15% |
| 2013 | 787 | 5.67% | 12,932 | 93.25% | 149 | 1.07% |
| 2008 | 2,747 | 7.82% | 31,594 | 89.97% | 776 | 2.21% |

== Emergency services ==
The City of Paterson is served by the Paterson Police Department.

The Paterson Fire Department, headed by Chief Brian McDermott, operates out of seven fire stations with a total of 400 employees and is also responsible for the city's emergency medical services division and ambulance units. The department is part of the Metro USAR Strike Team, which consists of nine North Jersey fire departments and other emergency services divisions working to address major emergency rescue situations.

In addition to local services, Paterson is home to the Passaic County Sheriff's Office Courts Division in the Passaic County Courthouse and Correctional Division in the Passaic County Jail. The jail, originally constructed in 1957, can accommodate 1,242 inmate beds.

In April 2011, Paterson laid off 125 police officers, nearly 25% of the total force in the city, due to severe budget constraints caused by a $70 million deficit. At the same time, the Guardian Angels, a New York City–based volunteer citizen safety patrol organization, began operating in Paterson at the invitation of the Mayor.

St. Joseph's Regional Medical Center is a large institution providing comprehensive emergency services as well as non-emergency medical care to Paterson and the surrounding community.

=== State takeover of police department ===
The New Jersey Attorney General took over control of the Paterson Police Department on March 27, 2023, after the fatal police shooting of Najee Seabrooks. Attorney General Matthew Platkin criticized the "revolving door" of police leadership in Paterson, which has resulted in dysfunction within police ranks and a lack of trust in local law enforcement. Platkin's comments alluded to the challenges created by frequent turnover at the top of the police department and the negative impact it has had on community relations. Mayor Sayegh has fired two police chiefs: Troy Oswald in 2020 and Mike Baycora in 2022.

== Transportation ==
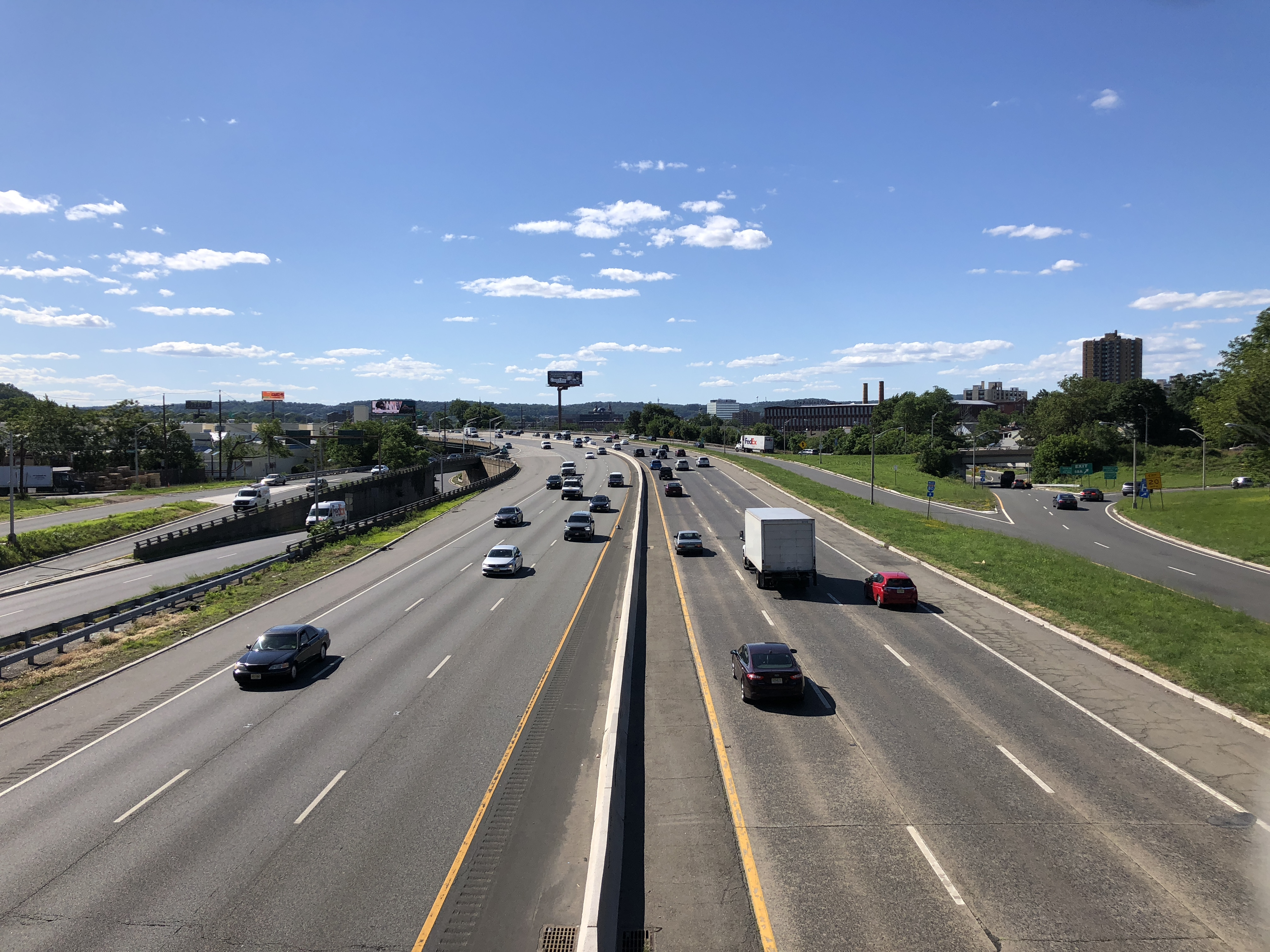
Interstate 80 westbound in Paterson

=== Roads and highways ===
As of May 2010, the city had a total of 195.28 miles (314.27 km) of roadways, of which 157.62 miles (253.66 km) were maintained by the municipality, 29.21 miles (47.01 km) by Passaic County and 8.45 miles (13.60 km) by the New Jersey Department of Transportation.

By road, Paterson is served directly by Interstate 80, as well as state routes 4, 19, and 20. The Garden State Parkway, U.S. Route 46, State routes 3, 17, 21, and 208 are also nearby and serve as feeder roads to the community.

Paterson also served as the terminus for numerous major secondary roads in northern New Jersey. Paterson Plank Road linked the city to Jersey City and eventually, the Hudson River waterfront in Hoboken, while the Paterson-Hamburg Turnpike connected the city with Sussex County along what is now parts of Route 23.

=== Public transportation ===
Train service is provided by NJ Transit at the Paterson station, located in downtown Paterson. Commuter rail on the Main Line offers service to Hoboken Terminal, with connections at Secaucus Junction to New York Penn Station in Midtown Manhattan.

Plans are being developed for a new commuter rail service on the existing NYS&W line, which is currently single-tracked. The Passaic-Bergen Rail Line plans to have five stops in Paterson.

Bus service to locations in Passaic, Bergen, Essex and Hudson counties is provided by NJ Transit, making the city a regional transit hub. The Broadway Bus Terminal, also in downtown, is the terminus for many NJ Transit bus lines.

Service to and from the Port Authority Bus Terminal in Midtown Manhattan is offered on the 151, 161 and the 190, by the 171 to the George Washington Bridge Bus Station, on the 72 to Newark, with local service provided on the 74, 702, 703, 704, 707, 712, 722, 744, 746, 748, and 770 routes. Many buses stop at or near City Hall, going to various points in the area, including New York City and neighboring communities.

Private, independent jitney buses (guaguas or dollar vans) connect Paterson with neighboring communities along Route 4 and provide transportation to and from the Port Authority Bus Terminal and George Washington Bridge Bus Station in Manhattan. These buses run at high frequency but do not have formal, published schedules. There are also long-distance counterparts that travel along I-80 out to Stroudsburg, Hazleton, Scranton, and Wilkes-Barre.

== Education ==
The Paterson Public Schools serve students in pre-kindergarten through twelfth grade. The district is one of 31 former Abbott districts statewide that were established pursuant to the decision by the New Jersey Supreme Court in Abbott v. Burke which are now referred to as "SDA Districts" based on the requirement for the state to cover all costs for school building and renovation projects in these districts under the supervision of the New Jersey Schools Development Authority.

As of the 2023–24 school year, the district, comprised of 43 schools, had an enrollment of 24,692 students and 1,762.0 classroom teachers (on an FTE basis), for a student–teacher ratio of 14.0:1. District enrollment in Paterson surged at the start of the 2015–16 school year, creating a public school enrollment of 700 students higher than expected and putting the school district in a situation of needing to hire teachers rapidly not long after the district had laid off 300 positions.

In 2011, all of Paterson's high schools were changed to theme schools, as part of a goal to give students a better choice in areas they wanted to pursue. Among the 594 students who took the SAT in 2013, the mean combined score was 1120 and there were 19 students (3.2% of those taking the exam) who achieved the combined score of 1550 that the College Board considers an indicator of college readiness, a decline from the 26 students (4.3%) who achieved the standard the previous year.

Paterson Charter School for Science and Technology is a charter school serving students in kindergarten through twelfth grade. Other charter schools include Community Charter School of Paterson (K–8), John P. Holland Charter School (K–8) and Paterson Arts and Science Charter School (K–7).

In 2021, Governor Murphy announced the approval of a new charter school, Brilla NJ, to be opened in 2023. It was the first approved charter in his first term as governor.

The city is host to the state's annual robotics competition held at Passaic County Community College. The North Jersey Robotics Competition was created to place high educational merit on the students of Paterson. The competition draws schools from around New Jersey. Three events make up the meet which takes place on two different days. The competition's tenth-anniversary event in 2011 was won by Paterson's Panther Academy.

Blessed Sacrament School and St. Gerard Majella School are elementary schools that operate under the auspices of the Roman Catholic Diocese of Paterson. In the face of declining enrollment and financial difficulties, Paterson Catholic High School, the city's last remaining Catholic high school, was closed by the Diocese of Paterson.

Paterson hosts the main campus of Passaic County Community College, established in the 1970s, which serves 13,000 students at its main campus and at satellite programs in Passaic, Wanaque and at the Public Safety Academy.

== Sister cities ==
Sister cities of Paterson include:

- Eskişehir, Turkey, May 22, 2002
- Lyon, Rhône, Auvergne-Rhône-Alpes, France
- Surat, Gujarat, India
- Ramallah, Palestine
- Vadodara, Gujarat, India
- Yulin, Shaanxi, China

=== Friendship ===
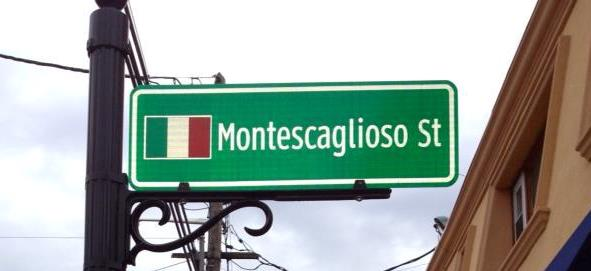
Montescaglioso Street in Paterson

There is a pact of friendship with the town of Montescaglioso (Matera, Basilicata, Italy), as testified by mutual naming of two streets in their city centers. Paterson was a place of Italian emigration from the late nineteenth century to the 1970s and today houses a large community of citizens of Montescaglioso who emigrated in those years.

- "Avenue Paterson" in Montescaglioso
- "Montescaglioso Street" in Paterson

The San Rocco Society was founded in Paterson, an association whose main purpose is to maintain sales relationships with the Italy, and in some ways the traditions.

== In popular culture ==
=== Literature ===
- Paterson is the subject of William Carlos Williams' five-book epic poem Paterson, a cornerstone work of modern American poetry.
- Paterson is also mentioned in the twelfth line of Part 1 of Allen Ginsberg's poem Howl. In the novel On the Road by Ginsberg's friend Jack Kerouac, the protagonist Sal Paradise lives with his aunt in Paterson. Kerouac may have chosen Paterson as a stand-in for his hometown of Lowell, Massachusetts, also a mill town with a waterfall.
- Paterson is the setting of many of Junot Díaz's short stories and novels, including the Pulitzer Prize-winning The Brief Wondrous Life of Oscar Wao, and John Updike's 1997 novel In the Beauty of the Lilies.
- The Poisoned Glass (2019) by Kimberly Tilley is the true story of the murder of 17-year-old immigrant Jennie Bosschieter in October 1900. (true crime/non-fiction/American history). Jennie worked in the silk mills of Paterson. She was given absinthe spiked with a lethal amount of a date rape drug by four prominent citizens, who were later the defendants in a sensational murder trial in 1901.

=== Films ===
- The controversial arrest and conviction of boxer Rubin "Hurricane" Carter, whose conviction was overturned in 1985, was dramatized in the 1999 Denzel Washington film, The Hurricane, and was partially shot in the city. The lyrics of the Bob Dylan song "Hurricane" include "In Paterson that's just the way things go / If you're Black you might as well not show / Up on the street / Unless you want to draw the heat". The film Lean on Me, while sensationalized, is based on events that occurred in Paterson's Eastside High School. Alice, Sweet Alice (1976) with Brooke Shields was filmed entirely in Paterson, the director's hometown, as was State Property. Its sequel, State Property 2, and Far from Heaven, The Preacher's Wife and Purple Rose of Cairo are among other films that were partially shot in Paterson. The city was also a filming location for the 1995 drama film, New Jersey Drive, which is primarily based on Newark's automobile theft rate at the time, with the city being considered "the car theft capital of the world".
- The 2016 film Paterson, directed by Jim Jarmusch, is set in Paterson and was largely filmed there. The movie is about a bus driver named Paterson who writes poetry in his free time.

=== Comedy ===
Lou Costello often referred to his hometown of Paterson in his comedy routines with Bud Abbott. The plot of the June 28, 1945, episode of the Abbott & Costello radio show is about the City of Paterson inviting him back for "Lou Costello Day" to launch a new garbage scow. Three Abbott and Costello films had their world premieres at the Fabian Theater in Paterson, which could accommodate a crowd of 3,000: One Night in the Tropics (1940), Abbott and Costello in the Foreign Legion and Jack and the Beanstalk (1952). Costello was honored with a larger-than-life statue in Federici Park in 1992.

=== TV ===
The Great Falls were featured in the first season of the HBO crime drama The Sopranos, both in the pilot and in the episode "Pax Soprana" as the place where Junior Soprano's friend's grandson committed suicide after taking poor designer drugs; as a favor, Junior Soprano had Mikey Palmice and another individual toss the dealer, Rusty Irish, off the bridge over the falls. Other locations throughout the city were used in the series, as much of the show was shot on location in North Jersey.

=== Music ===
The New Jersey–based band Suit of Lights pays tribute to Paterson in their song "Goodbye Silk City". The 1983 music video "Two Tribes" by Frankie Goes to Hollywood makes reference to Paterson in its opening sequence.

=== Inventions ===
- The first marketable revolver was produced in Paterson by Samuel Colt starting in 1836, and was known as the Colt Paterson.
- The first steam-powered and first electric-powered model trains were both invented in Paterson. Eugene Beggs made the first steam-powered train in the city around 1871. Beggs' employee, Jehu Garlick, invented the first electric-powered model train that consisted of a tinplate toy locomotive with four aluminum wheels. A 2016 exhibit at the New Jersey State Museum titled "Toy World" highlighted the history of New Jersey's toy-making industry and prominently featured Paterson's contribution to the history of toys.

== Notable people ==
People who were born in, residents of, or otherwise closely associated with Paterson include: ( (B) denotes that the person was born in Paterson).

- Tom Acker (1930–2021), MLB pitcher who played for four seasons with the Cincinnati Reds
- Jorge Acosta (born 1964), retired Colombian-born American soccer forward who earned 12 caps with the U.S. national team in 1991 and 1992
- Jimmie Adams (1888–1933), silent-screen comedian and actor
- Mike Adams (born 1981), pro football player for the Indianapolis Colts
- Adeva (born 1960), house music and R&B vocalist
- Nelson Algren (1909–1981), author best known for his novel The Man with the Golden Arm
- Henry C. Allen (1872–1942), politician who represented New Jersey's 6th congressional district in the United States House of Representatives 1905–1907
- Bruce Arians (born 1952), former head coach of the NFL's Arizona Cardinals and Tampa Bay Buccaneers
- Jillian Armenante (born 1968), television and film actress, known for playing the role of Donna Kozlowski on Judging Amy (B)
- Gerald Ash (born 1942), electrical engineer at Bell Labs, whose research focused on routing problems (B)
- Sisto Averno (1925–2012), guard and linebacker who played in the NFL for the original Baltimore Colts (1950), the New York Yanks (1951), Dallas Texans (1952) and the Baltimore Colts (1953–1954)
- Vincent Baggetta (born 1944), actor best known for his title role in the 1978–79 television series, The Eddie Capra Mysteries
- Samm Sinclair Baker (1909–1997), author/coauthor of how-to and self-help books, most notably The Complete Scarsdale Medical Diet which he coauthored with Dr. Herman Tarnower (B)
- Nathan Barnert (1838–1927), businessman and politician; twice elected as the Mayor of Paterson
- Lawrence Barrett (1838–1891), leading actor of the 19th century
- Charles K. Barton (1886–1958), politician; served in the New Jersey Senate 1943–1948 (B)
- Charles D. Beckwith (1838–1921), represented New Jersey's 5th congressional district 1889–1891; mayor of Paterson 1885–1889
- Candace Beinecke (born 1946/1947), Senior Partner of Hughes Hubbard & Reed, where in 1999 she became the first female head of a major New York firm
- Alexander Berzin (born 1944), Buddhist scholar, translator and teacher focusing on the Tibetan tradition
- Jeffrey Bewkes (born 1952), CEO, President, and chairman of the Board of Time Warner
- Jacob Bigeleisen (1919–2010), chemist who worked on the Manhattan Project on techniques to extract uranium-235 from uranium ore (B)
- Chauncey Black (born 1968), singer with the vocal group Blackstreet
- Glenn Borgmann (born 1950), former professional baseball catcher who played in Major League Baseball for the Minnesota Twins and Chicago White Sox (B)
- Jennie Bosschieter (1882–1900), woman who was raped and murdered, as an early victim of the date rape drug chloral hydrate which caused her death
- Joseph Brain (born 1940), physiologist and environmental health researcher (B)
- Bill Braun, auto racer
- Pete Bremy (born 1952), rock bass player best known for his associations with Vanilla Fudge and Cactus (B)
- Gaetano Bresci (1869–1901), weaver and anarchist, assassinated Italian king Umberto I
- Johnny Briggs (born 1944), former Major League Baseball player
- Mark Brown (born 1980), NFL linebacker who played for the New York Jets
- Edna Buchanan (born 1939), journalist and writer best known for her crime mystery novels
- Rubin "Hurricane" Carter (1937–2014), boxer whose triple murder conviction was later overturned, subject of the Bob Dylan song "Hurricane" and the movie The Hurricane
- Federico Castelluccio (born 1964), Italian-born actor, most known for portraying Furio Giunta on the HBO series The Sopranos
- Frank Catania (born 1941), politician who served in the New Jersey General Assembly from the 35th Legislative District 1990–1994 (B)
- Ersilia Cavedagni (1862–?), Italian-American anarcha-feminist activist, writer, and editor
- Joe Clark (1938–2020), educator and former principal of Eastside High School, depicted by Morgan Freeman in the movie Lean on Me
- Stockton B. Colt (1863–1937), architect (B)
- Lou Costello (1906–1959), comedian, actor and producer and part of the comedy duo Abbott and Costello (He made frequent references to the town in his films.) (B)
- Pat Costello (1902–1990), actor, producer, stunt double and the brother of Lou Costello, who was the executive producer for The Abbott and Costello Show (B)
- Ernestina Cravello (1880–1942), Italian-American anarcha-feminist activist during the late 19th and early 20th centuries
- Sunda Croonquist, comic and actress
- Victor Cruz (born 1986), wide receiver for the NFL Super Bowl championship team, the New York Giants
- Joe Cunningham (1931–2021), former MLB first baseman and outfielder who played for the St. Louis Cardinals, Chicago White Sox and Washington Senators (B)
- Joan Wadleigh Curran (born 1950), visual artist, painter and printmaker (B)
- Frank Davenport (1912–1995), politician; Sheriff of Passaic County and served one term in the New Jersey Senate (B)
- Anthony Davis (born 1951), pianist and composer (B)
- Richard W. DeKorte (1936–1979), politician; member of the New Jersey General Assembly (B)
- Andrew Derrom (1817–1892), military officer, inventor, civil engineer, and industrialist
- Bob DeVos (born 1946), jazz guitarist (B)
- William L. Dill (1874–1952), jurist who served on the New Jersey Court of Errors and Appeals; politician; Democratic nominee for Governor of New Jersey in 1928 and 1934
- Larry Doby (1923–2003), Hall of Fame Major League Baseball player and manager who broke the color barrier in the American League
- Eric Downing (born 1978), NFL player
- Henry Drucker (1942–2002), political scientist and university fund-raiser (B)
- Jacqueline Dubrovich (born 1994), Olympic foil fencer (B)
- Lou Duva (1922–2017), boxing trainer, manager, and promoter, member of the International Boxing Hall Of Fame
- Randy Edelman (born 1947), film and TV score composer (B)
- Barry Edelstein (born 1965), theatre director, author, and educator; artistic director of the Old Globe Theatre in San Diego, California (B)
- W. Cary Edwards (1944–2010), politician; Attorney General of New Jersey 1986–1989 (B)
- Eddie Einhorn (1936–2016), television executive, part-owner of the Chicago White Sox
- Derrick Etienne (born 1996), professional soccer player for the New York Red Bulls
- William W. Evans Jr. (1921–1999), politician who served as Mayor of Wyckoff and in the New Jersey General Assembly; candidate for the Republican nomination for president in 1968 (B)
- George Feifer (1934–2019), journalist, novelist, and historian, known for his autobiographical novels chronicling life in the Soviet Union (B)
- Laurie Fendrich (born 1948), artist, writer and educator best known for her geometric abstract paintings (B)
- John A. Ferraro (1946–2010), actor, academic, stage director, and television director
- Helene Fortunoff (1933–2021), businessperson who headed Fortunoff (B)
- J. John Fox (c. 1904–1999), judge known for his central role in the founding of the University of Massachusetts Medical School (B)
- Sidney Geist (1914–2005), artist who was known for his sculpture and his art criticism (B)
- Abe Gelbart (1911–1994), mathematician, founding dean of the Belfer Graduate School of Science at Yeshiva University, namesake of the International Research Institute for Mathematical Sciences at Bar-Ilan University in Ramat Gan, Israel
- Allen Ginsberg (1926–1997), writer and Beat Generation poet
- Teresa Giudice (born 1972), reality show participant on The Real Housewives of New Jersey
- Abraham Godwin (1724–1777), captain of Marines USS Lady Washington in 1776
- Abraham Godwin (1763–1835), member of the New Jersey General Assembly 1802–1806
- Abraham Godwin Jr. (1791–1849), member of the New Jersey General Assembly 1821–1832
- Parke Godwin (1816–1904), journalist (B)
- Percy Goetschius (1853–1943), teacher of the theory of musical composition (B)
- Shotsie Gorman (born 1951), tattoo artist, painter, sculptor and poet (B)
- Bill Haast (1910–2011), snake and venom specialist, director of Miami Serpentarium Laboratories (B)
- Alen Hadzic (born 1991), former épée fencer, banned for life for sexual misconduct (B)
- Thomas Hagan (born 1941), one of the men convicted for the assassination of Malcolm X
- Joseph Haj, actor, eighth artistic director of the Guthrie Theater
- Alexander Hamilton (1755/57–1804), first United States Secretary of the Treasury; helped found the Society for the Establishment of Useful Manufactures (S.U.M.) that helped establish Paterson around the Great Falls
- Keith Hamilton (born 1971), NFL defensive tackle who spent his entire 12-season career with the New York Giants
- Larry Hand (born 1940), defensive end and defensive tackle who played in the National Football League (NFL) for the Detroit Lions 1965–1977 (B)
- The Happenings, pop music group created in the 1960s
- Donald Hayden (1937–2014), politician who served in the New Jersey General Assembly from the 35th Legislative District from 1994 to 1996, and on the Paterson city council (B)
- Gerald Hayes (born 1980), linebacker for the Arizona Cardinals
- Jon Herington (born 1954), guitarist, singer-songwriter, record producer, and session musician (B)
- Ureli Corelli Hill (1802–1875), music conductor and founder of the New York Symphony Orchestra
- Garret A. Hobart (1844–1899), Speaker of the New Jersey General Assembly, President of the New Jersey Senate and the 24th Vice President of the United States, serving under President William McKinley
- Kendall Holt (born 1981), light welterweight boxer who held the WBO junior welterweight championship 2008–09
- Michael Hossack (1946–2012), drummer, member of the Doobie Brothers
- William Hughes (1872–1918), lawyer and politician who represented New Jersey's sixth congressional district (from 1903 to 1905 and 1907 to 1912) and served as United States Senator from New Jersey (from 1913 to 1918)
- Michael Jace (born 1962), actor who appeared in The Shield
- Ameer Jackson (born 1994), American professional basketball player (B)
- Charlie Jamieson (1893–1969), Major League Baseball player
- Henry Janowitz (1915–2008), professor emeritus of Gastroenterology at the Icahn School of Medicine at Mount Sinai, known for his contributions into inflammatory bowel diseases (B)
- Morris Janowitz (1919–1988), sociologist and professor who made major contributions to sociological theory, the study of prejudice, urban issues and patriotism (B)
- Charles Samuel Joelson (1916–1999), lawyer and politician who served on the Paterson City Council and as the Representative for New Jersey's 8th congressional district 1961–1969
- Devhonte Johnson, Brazilian jiu-jitsu competitor and coach (B)
- Jemal Johnson (born 1985), former professional soccer player, most known for his spell with English League One side MK Dons (B)
- Maxine Jones (born 1966), singer, member of En Vogue
- Ron Cephas Jones (born 1957), actor known for This is Us, Mr. Robot and Across The Universe
- Just Blaze (born 1978), hip hop music producer
- Alfred E. Kahn (1917–2010), economist and deregulation advocate
- Alvin Kass (1935–2025), rabbi who was the chief chaplain of the New York City Police Department (B)
- Carla A. Katz (born 1959), labor leader who served as president of Local 1034 of the Communications Workers of America 1999–2008
- Joseph Keller (1923–2016), mathematician who specialized in applied mathematics (B)
- King Kelly (1857–1894), Major League Baseball player and member of the Baseball Hall of Fame
- Bernard Kerik (born 1955), former New York City Police Commissioner
- Joseph Kipley (1848–1904), Superintendent of the Chicago Police Department 1897–1901 (B)
- Gabriel Kolko (1932–2014), historian, author (B)
- Garret Kramer, author and performance coach (B)
- Vincent R. Kramer (1918–2001), United States Marine Corps colonel who was a guerrilla warfare expert and was awarded the Navy Cross during the Korean War (B)
- Peter Kreeft (born 1937), philosopher at Boston College and The King's College and author of numerous popular books of Christian philosophy, theology, and apologetics (B)
- Sally Kornbluth (born 1960), cell biologist and academic administrator, serving as the 18th president of the Massachusetts Institute of Technology (B)
- Jim Lampley (born 1960), professional basketball center who played for the Philadelphia 76ers during the 1986–87 season
- Sue Ane Langdon (born 1936), actress (B)
- Frank Lautenberg (1924–2013), politician who represented New Jersey in the United States Senate (B)
- Jaynee LaVecchia (born 1954), Justice who has served on the New Jersey Supreme Court since 2000 (B)
- John L. Leal (1858–1914), physician and water utility sanitary adviser; responsible for the installation of the first drinking water chlorine disinfection system in the United States
- Walt Levinsky (1929–1999), big band and orchestral player, composer, arranger, and bandleader
- Son Lewis (born 1951), blues singer and guitarist (B)
- John LoCascio (born 1991), defenseman for the Rochester Rattlers in Major League Lacrosse
- David P. Long (born 1975), academic administrator, professor and Roman Catholic canonist (B)
- Adrienne Mancia (1927–2022), curator best known for her work with the Museum of Modern Art and the Brooklyn Academy of Music
- Don Martin (1931–2000), cartoonist for Mad magazine
- Edward L. Masry (1932–2005), attorney whose firm was behind the case featured in Erin Brockovich (B)
- Frank Mattiace (born 1961), former professional football nose tackle and coach (B)
- Markis McDuffie (born 1997), professional basketball player for Maccabi Ashdod of the Israeli Basketball Premier League
- Thomas McEwan Jr. (1854–1926), represented New Jersey's 7th congressional district from 1895 to 1899
- Edward McNamara (1884–1944), Broadway and Hollywood actor who was discovered while working as a police officer in Paterson (B)
- Verna Mersereau (1896–1935), dancer and actress who performed on stage and screen (B)
- George Middleton (1880–1967), playwright (B)
- Gemar Mills, author and speaker, who was the youngest ever principal of Malcolm X Shabazz High School when he took the job at age 27
- Susan Misner (born 1971), actress who has appeared on films and television, including roles in One Life to Live, The Bronx Is Burning, Rescue Me and Chicago
- Joe Mooney (1911–1975), jazz and pop accordionist, organist, and vocalist, who went blind at the age of 10
- Paul H. Mussen (1922–2000), developmental psychologist who described stages of child psychological development (B)
- Greg Olsen (born 1985), former tight end for the Carolina Panthers, Chicago Bears, and Seattle Seahawks (B)
- Kenny Parker (born 1946), former American football defensive back who played in the NFL for the New York Giants (B)
- Vincent N. Parrillo, professor of sociology at William Paterson University
- Patricia Peardon (1923/24-1993), actress who originated the title role in the Broadway play Junior Miss (B)
- Simon Perchik (1923–2022), poet
- Joseph D. Pistone (born 1939), FBI agent and author who infiltrated the Bonanno crime family, as described in the film Donnie Brasco
- Robert Pitofsky (1929–2018), lawyer and politician who was the chairman of the Federal Trade Commission from 1995 to 2001 (B)
- Bucky Pizzarelli (1926–2020), jazz guitarist
- John Pizzarelli (born 1960), jazz guitarist and singer
- Martin Pizzarelli (born 1963), jazz double-bassist
- Nellie Pou (born 1956), U.S. representative for New Jersey (B)
- Dave Prater (1937–1988), of the soul duo Sam & Dave
- Amos H. Radcliffe (1870–1950), Mayor of Paterson, New Jersey, 1916–1919; represented New Jersey's 7th congressional district 1919–1923
- Prince Randian (1871–1934), sideshow performer
- Zoogz Rift (1953–2011), musician, painter and professional wrestling personality (B)
- Lori L. Robinson, United States Army major general serving as the 80th Commandant of the United States Military Academy
- Sarah-Nicole Robles (born 1991), actress and voice actress, best known for providing the voice of Luz Noceda in the Disney Channel animated series The Owl House
- George Rochberg (1918–2005), classical composer (B)
- Frederick Reines (1918–1998), Nobel Prize-winning physicist who co-discovered the neutrino
- Frankie Ruiz (1958–1998), salsa music singer (B)
- John Ryle (1817–1887), industrialist and capitalist; known as the "father of the United States silk industry", starting the first silk mill in 1839
- Mary Danforth Ryle (1833–1904), philanthropist who donated millions to various city institutions, notably the Danforth Memorial Library
- Kathryn Salfelder (born 1987), classical composer (B)
- Nicholas Samra (born 1944), eparch of the Melkite Catholic Eparchy of Newton in the United States, elected in 2011 (B)
- Kathryn Scola (1891–1982) screenwriter known for the pre-code film Baby Face (1933), and the adaptation of the Dashiell Hammett novel The Glass Key (1935).
- Dave Scott (born 1953), former American football offensive lineman who played in the NFL for the Atlanta Falcons
- Louis Scott (1889–1954), gold medal winner at the 1912 Summer Olympics in Stockholm
- Omar Sheika (born 1977), former professional boxer and multiple time super middleweight world title challenger
- Marcel Shipp (born 1978), running back for the Arizona Cardinals
- Rocco Silano (born 1962), magician and author
- Dave Sime (1936–2016), Olympic medal-winning sprinter
- Jack Wilkinson Smith (1873–1949), painter (B)
- John Spencer (1946–2005), actor, best known for his role as Leo McGarry, the White House Chief of Staff on the television drama The West Wing
- John A. Spizziri (born 1934), politician who served in the New Jersey General Assembly from 1972 to 1978 (B)
- Bill Stern (1926 –2021), botanist (B)
- Sol Stetin (1910–2005), labor union leader
- Lewis Atterbury Stimson (1844–1917), surgeon who was the first to perform a public operation in the United States using Joseph Lister's antiseptic technique (B)
- J. Michael Straczynski (born 1954), science-fiction writer, creator and writer for Babylon 5 (B)
- Jesse Talbot (1805–1879) Hudson River School painter, Associate Member of the National Academy of Design, and friend to Walt Whitman. Talbot lived in Paterson in the late 1840s and painted some of his major works there
- Kazbek Tambi (born 1961), Seton Hall University women's soccer team head coach and retired U.S. soccer midfielder; member of the U.S. Olympic soccer team at the 1984 Summer Olympics; spent two seasons in the North American Soccer League, four in the Major Indoor Soccer League and one in the American Soccer League; former United States U-17 women's soccer team coach
- Albert Tangora (1903–1978), holder of the speed record for typing on a manual typewriter
- Joe Taub (1929–2017), businessman who joined his brother Henry Taub and Frank Lautenberg in building the payroll company Automatic Data Processing; later was part of an investment group that acquired the New Jersey Nets (B)
- Tim Thomas (born 1977), NBA basketball player
- Dante Tomaselli (born 1969), horror film screenwriter, director, and composer (B)
- Robert Torricelli (born 1951), politician, former representative of New Jersey in the United States Senate and United States House of Representatives (B)
- Sammy Turner (born 1932), singer who was popular in the late 1950s (B)
- Gregory Van Maanen (born 1947), artist
- Ed Van Put (1936–2024), fisherman, author and conservationist (B)
- Elizabeth Vargas (born 1962), ABC news anchor (B)
- Bruce Vilanch (born 1948), six-time Emmy Award-winning comedy writer, actor and songwriter
- "Uncle" Floyd Vivino (born 1951), comic and star of Uncle Floyd Show, the longest-running broadcast and cable TV show in New Jersey; appeared in film Good Morning, Vietnam
- Jerry Vivino (born 1954), musician (B)
- Jimmy Vivino (born 1955), musician, guitarist, member of The Max Weinberg 7
- Fetty Wap (born 1991), rapper and singer
- William Wadsworth Evans (1887–1972), politician who served in the New Jersey General Assembly from 1919 to 1924 (B)
- Carter Warren (born 1999), American football offensive tackle who played for the New York Jets
- Darryl Watkins (born 1984), professional basketball player who played collegiately at Syracuse
- Patrick Warburton (born 1964), actor, best known for his roles in Seinfeld and Family Guy (B)
- Bernie Wayne (1919–1993), composer best known for "Blue Velvet"
- Joseph Weber (1919–2000), physicist who gave the earliest public lecture on the principles behind the laser and the maser and developed Weber bars, the first gravitational wave detectors (B)
- Carl Weinrich (1904–1991), classical organist known for his recitals and recordings of Baroque organ music (B)
- Bert Wheeler (1895–1968), of the comedy duo Wheeler & Woolsey
- Alice White (1904–1983), film actress
- K'Waun Williams (born 1991), cornerback who has played in the NFK for the San Francisco 49ers and Denver Broncos
- William Carlos Williams (1883–1963), important modern 20th-century poet; author of the poem "Paterson"
- C. Mortimer Wiske (1853–1934), conductor and organist for several churches in Paterson, and the longtime director of the Paterson Music Festival
- Michael Wolff (b. 1953), journalist and author
- Donald R. Yennie (1924–1993). theoretical physicist (B)
- Jerry Zaks (born 1946), stage and television director and actor
- Giuseppe Zangara (1900–1933), assassin of Chicago mayor Anton Cermak, though President-elect Franklin D. Roosevelt may have been his intended target
- Herb Zarrow (1925–2008), magician who created the Zarrow shuffle (B)
- Paul Zukerberg (born 1957), lawyer, activist and politician (B)

== See also ==
- 1913 Paterson silk strike
- 1902 Paterson silk strike
- 1835 Paterson textile strike
