= Verna Mersereau =

American actress and dancer (1896–1935)

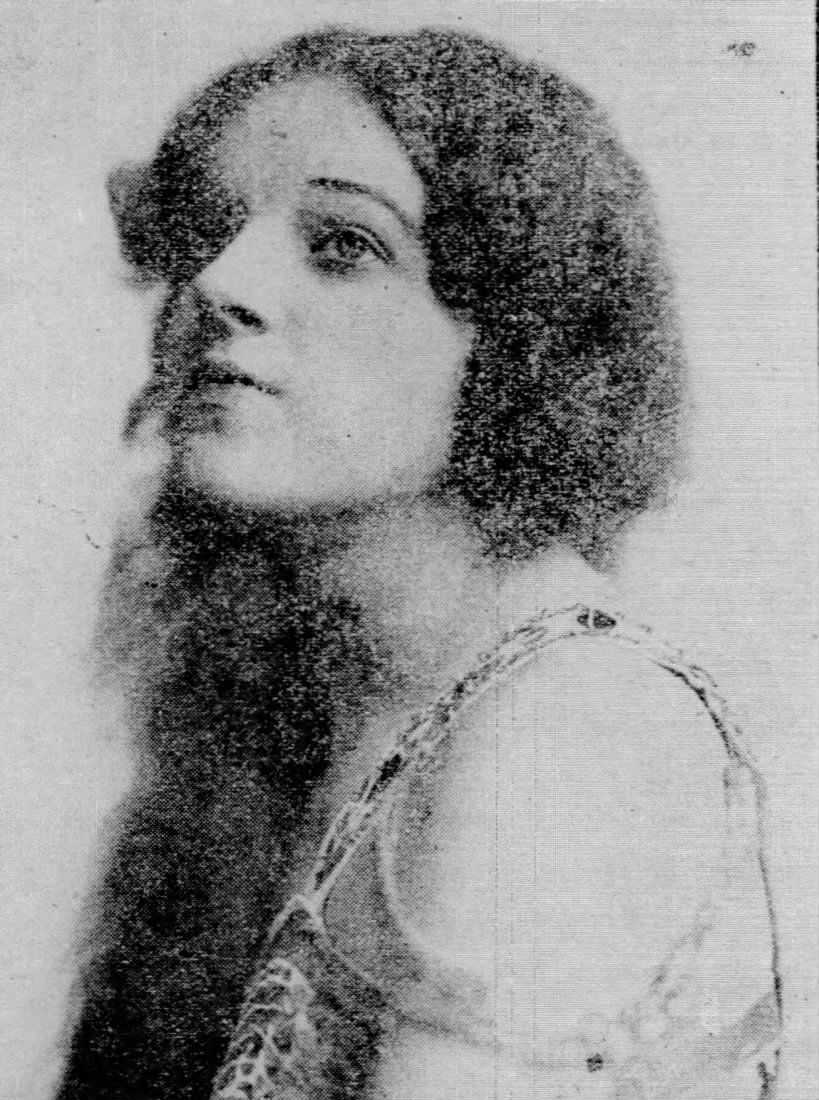
- Mersereau c. 1912
- Born: 1896; Paterson, New Jersey, U.S.
- Died: September 26, 1935 (aged 38–39); Sacramento, California, U.S.
- Other names: Verna Mersereau Capra
- Occupations: Actress; dancer
- Years active: 1909–1933
- Known for: The Dance of Death; The Dancer

Verna Mersereau (1896–1935), also known as Verna Mersereau Capra, was an American actress, dancer and pantomimist who performed on stage and screen. She appeared in several films with multiple forms of ancient dance. A New Jerseyan by birth, she ended up spending her childhood in Oakland, California, where she became known as the "Idora Park baby" because of her father's amusement park construction. She was highly interested in dance and theater from a young age, being trained by her aunt and taking trips to Europe and Asian countries in order to learn various dance styles.

Going on to be featured in numerous plays even in her teenage years, Mersereau was considered one of the best classic dancers of the time and her use of pantomime was among the greatest in vaudeville theater. Her successes would see her dancing performed in multiple films and, later in life, before royalty in Calcutta. She left the stage in 1933 after contracting an illness that would ultimately lead to her death in 1935.

== Childhood and education ==
Born in 1896 in Paterson, New Jersey, to Mr. and Mrs. Charles J. Mersereau, Verna went to local schools throughout her childhood. Once she turned nine, her family moved to the Western United States where she finished with primary school. After the family had resettled in Oakland, California, Mersereau's father, an amusement park constructor, created the Oakland amusement park during her childhood. Mersereau was known to roam around the construction area, which resulted in her being given the nickname the "Idora Park baby". As a teenager and young adult, she studied dance and made trips to Europe and "the Orient" to train in different styles. She also spent time training her dances with her aunt Theodora Warmolts Van Ness in the eastern United States.

== Career ==
In 1909 during her early teens, Mersereau joined the Kolb & Dill Farce Comedy company to begin appearing in plays in Oakland. The following year, she appeared in the play Mizpah, where she performed an Assyrian dance. She later went into vaudeville theater after reaching adulthood and performed at the Majestic Theatre. For the 1914 production of The Dancer, she performed as the female lead, with Mersereau using her well known history as a classical dancer to perform the "Dance of the Pyramids" and the "Dance of the Rameses" in the film. After appearing in several early films where she presented her dancing capabilities, she returned to theatre and signed an exclusive contract with the Pantages theatre despite multiple film studios trying to hire her.

In 1917, she performed a solo act, with a single assistant, of her dancing play A Romance of Old Egypt, described by The Victoria Daily Times as "representing her unusual expressive arm flexibility". The Times also said that she was "one of the most successful of the classic dancers now before the public" and that her original plays featuring her dancing pantomime were "one of the finest expositions of the art on the vaudeville stage today."

Completing a number of theatre performances in the following years, she later joined the Richard Wilbur company and their tour of the countries across Asia as the company's leading woman. They toured across multiple countries in Asia, arriving in Shanghai in April 1927. The tour resulted in her performing in the lead role for the play Rain for royalty in Calcutta, India. Her final performance was in 1933 after joining the Sacramento Players for Night Over Taos. Afterwards, she had to leave the theater due to an illness. She entered into the Weimar sanatorium in March 1935 to try and recuperate.

== Theater ==
- Playing The Ponies (1909)
- Mizpah (1910)
- The Vengeance of the Goddess (1912)
- A Romance of Old Egypt (1917)
- Making The Movies (1919)

== Filmography ==
- The Dance of Death (1914)
- The Dancer as Evelyn Wade (1914)
- Cupid's Round Up (1918) as Peggy Blair
- Chalk Marks (1925) as Josie Jennings

== Personal life ==
Mersereau was married to George F. McCormick in 1924, but they later divorced. She remarried in early 1934 to Joseph Capra. She died of a long-term illness over several years on September 26, 1935, at her home in Sacramento, California.
