= Josiah Huntoon =

American businessman and abolitionist

Josiah Parmerley Huntoon (July 16, 1813 – 1891) was a businessman and abolitionist in New Jersey. A painting of him by Thomas Waterman Wood is in the National Portrait Gallery.

He was born in Montpelier, Vermont. He lived in Paterson, New Jersey.

He had a successful coffee business including a mill. He and his apprentice William Van Rensalier, an African American who became an engineer, were part of the Underground Railroad. A plaque commemorates their work in helping people who escaped slavery.

Huntoon's home, a stop on the Underground Railway, was demolished for a parking garage and later a Taco Bell was proposed for the site.

His son Louis Huntoon was an economics professor at Yale University and wrote a family history.
