= Chalk Marks =

1924 film directed by John G. Adolfi

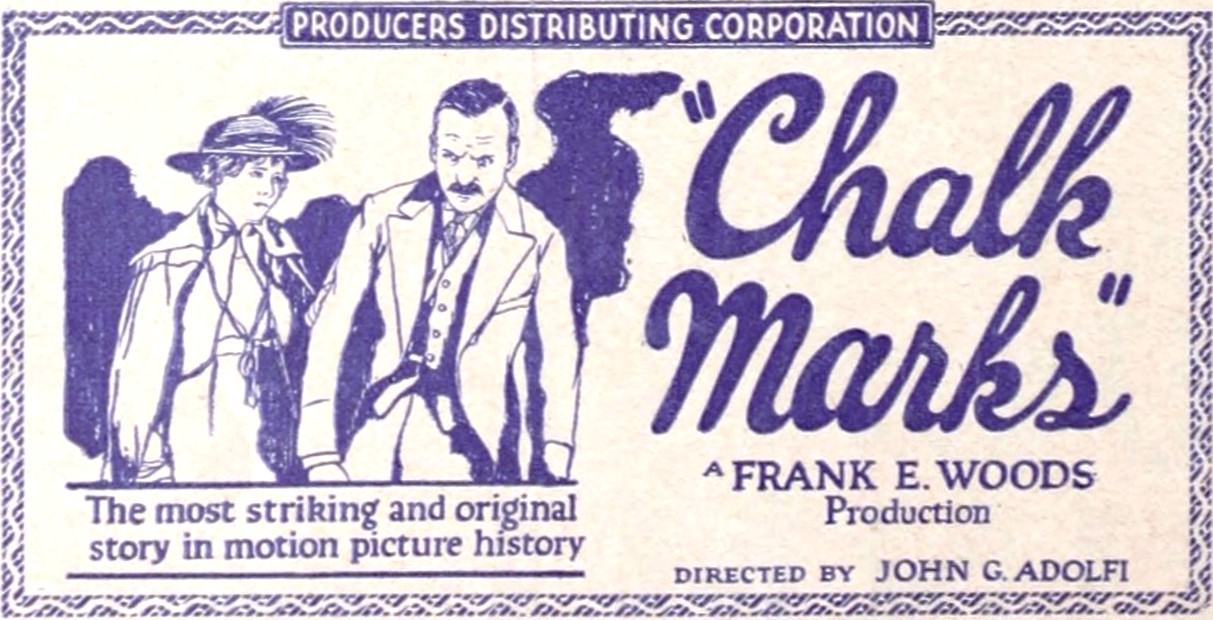
- Advertisement
- Directed by: John G. Adolfi
- Written by: Frank E. Woods
- Produced by: Peninsula Studios
- Starring: Marguerite Snow; June Elvidge
- Cinematography: Charles E. Kaufman; Joseph Walker
- Production company: Peninsula Studios
- Distributed by: Producers Distributing Corporation
- Release date: September 14, 1924
- Running time: 7 reels
- Country: United States
- Language: Silent (English intertitles)

Chalk Marks is a 1924 American silent drama film directed by John G. Adolfi and starring Marguerite Snow and June Elvidge. It was distributed by Producers Distributing Corporation.

== Cast ==
- Marguerite Snow as Angelina Kilbourne
- Ramsey Wallace as Herbert Thompson
- June Elvidge as Ann Morton
- Lydia Knott as Mrs. Mary Kilbourne
- Rex Lease as Bert Thompson
- Helen Ferguson as Virginia Thompson
- Priscilla Bonner as Betty Towner
- Harold Holland as Red Doran
- Verna Mersereau as Josie Jennings
- Fred Church as- The Stranger
- Lee Willard as Hotel Guest

== Preservation ==
With no prints of Chalk Marks located in any film archives, it is a lost film.
