= Gregory Van Maanen =

Gregory Van Maanen (born November 3, 1947, in Paterson, New Jersey) is an artist who has been exhibiting work since 1988. He has had several solo shows at Cavin-Morris Gallery in New York as well as a solo show at Rutgers University. His work has been widely shown in group exhibitions and Van Maanen’s art is in the permanent collections of the New Orleans Museum of Art, First Bank of Minneapolis, National Vietnam Veterans Art Museum, New Jersey State Council of the Arts, Jersey City Museum, Morris Museum, and others.

== Life ==
Gregory Van Maanen began his work as an artist following discharge from the Army. A New Jersey native and Vietnam War veteran, he received a Purple Heart in honor of his service. Like many veterans, he deals with tortuous memories of Vietnam and suffers from post-traumatic shock. A bullet remains in his shoulder from wounds suffered during the war. Van Maanen served in the Vietnam War between June 1968 and January 1970 and was discharged and sent home after undergoing severe physical and mental impairments, including post-traumatic stress disorder (PTSD). After several years of traveling, Van Maanen began to paint voraciously—on surfaces ranging from found objects to scrap board—to help him deal with the difficulties of PTSD and exorcise the demons in his mind.

== Process ==
After several years of traveling, Van Maanen began to paint voraciously—on surfaces ranging from found objects to scrap board—to help him deal with the difficulties of PTSD and exorcise the demons in his mind. His paintings feature skulls, all-seeing eyes, open palms, glowing hearts, and a plethora of personalized symbols of protection. Some of the images may at first seem frightening, but the artist sees them as “good magic,” as talismans intended to keep evil at bay and signs of magic, of solace, and of survival. Van Maanen continues to converse with the spirit world and make art every day. The shrapnel lodged in his shoulder still plagues him, and he is frank about the reality of living with PTSD. Yet he remains a firm believer in the healing power of art for veterans and nonveterans alike. Painting provides him with the means to address his internal struggles. His art-making — his escape — is a record of the thoughts, images, names, demons, memories, and hopes to populate his internal world.
