= Cupid's Round Up =

1918 film

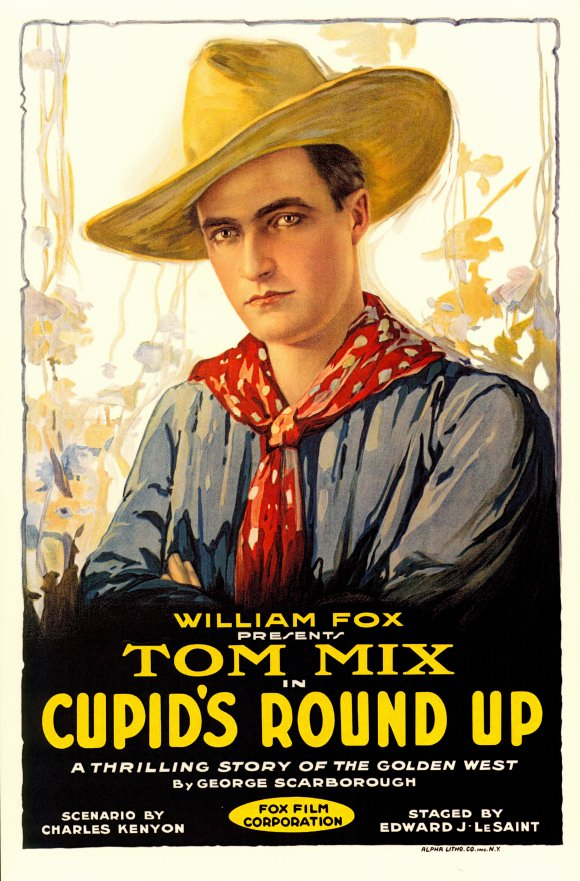
- Theatrical poster
- Directed by: Edward LeSaint
- Written by: Charles Kenyon (scenario)
- Story by: George Scarborough
- Produced by: Fox Film Corporation
- Starring: Tom Mix
- Distributed by: Fox Film Corporation
- Release date: January 13, 1918
- Running time: 5 reels
- Country: United States
- Language: Silent (English intertitles)

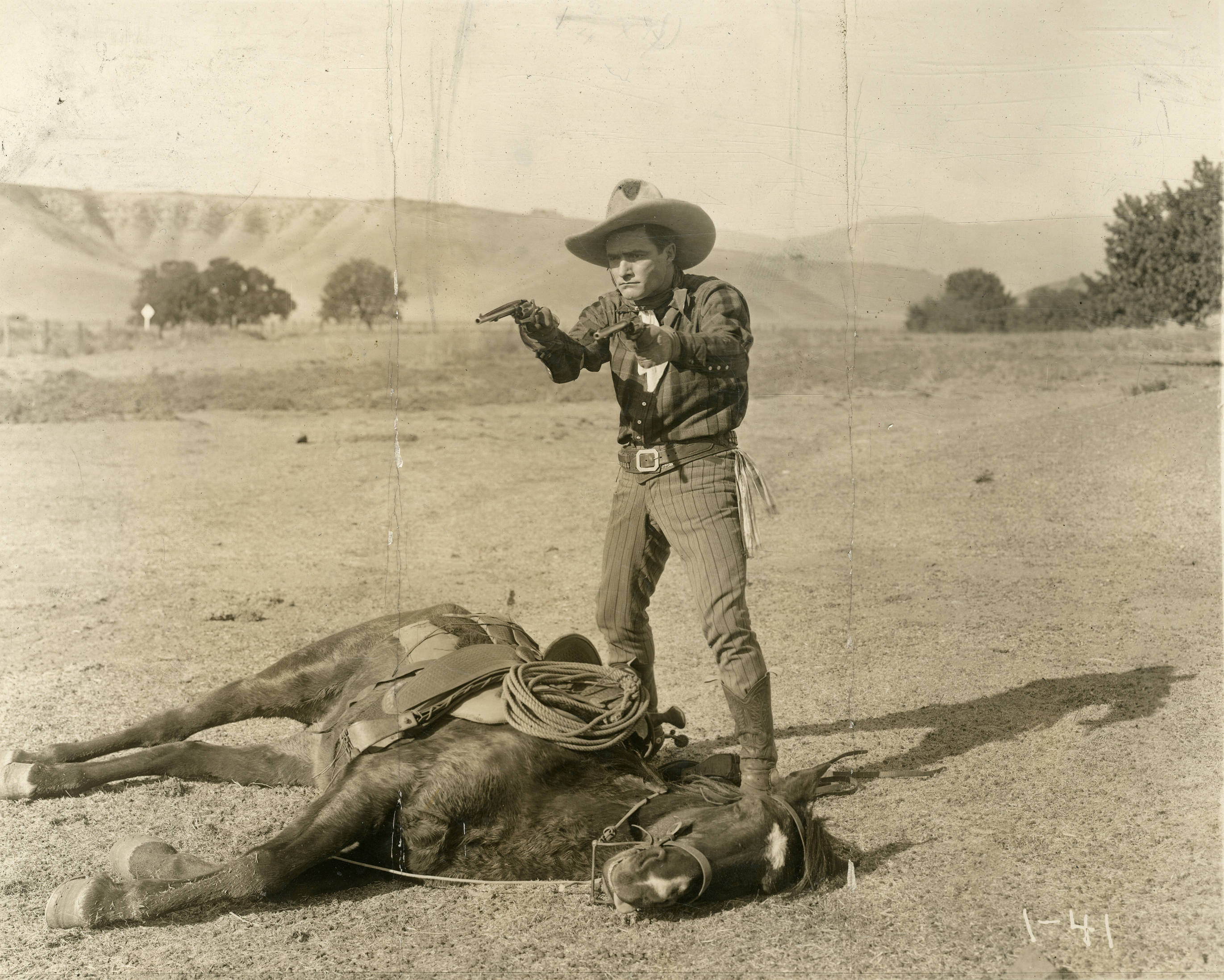
A scene from Cupid's Round-Up

Cupid's Round Up is a lost 1918 American silent Western film directed by Edward LeSaint and starring Tom Mix. It was produced and distributed by Fox Film Corporation. This was Mix's first film with Fox.

== Cast ==
- Tom Mix as Larry Kelly
- Wanda Hawley as Helen Baldwin (credited as Wanda Petit)
- Edwin B. Tilton as James Kelly (credited Edwin Booth Tilton)
- Roy Watson as Buckland
- Verna Mersereau as Peggy Blair
- Alfred Paget as Jim Cocksey (credited as Al Paget)
- Frederick R. Clark as McGinnis (credited as Fred Clark)
- Eugenie Forde as Red Bird

== Preservation ==
With no holdings located in archives, Cupid's Roundup is considered a lost film.

== See also ==
- 1937 Fox vault fire
- Tom Mix filmography
