= Frank Napier =

American school superintendent (1935–2002)

- Born: August 8, 1935
- Died: October 28, 2002 (aged 67)
- Occupation: Superintendent
- Known for: 1989 film Lean on Me

Frank Napier Jr. (August 8, 1935 – October 28, 2002) was an American educator who served as superintendent of the Paterson School District in Paterson, New Jersey. In the 1980s, he received national recognition as superintendent through Joe Louis Clark, the notable and controversial former principal of Eastside High School. It was Napier who asked Clark to be the principal of Eastside High. Napier was portrayed by Robert Guillaume in the 1989 film, Lean on Me.

== Biography ==
Napier graduated from Paterson Central High School (since renamed as John F. Kennedy High School) in 1953. He earned his Bachelor of Science and Master of Arts degrees from William Paterson University and the University of Massachusetts Amherst conferred a Doctorate of Education degree upon him. Napier began his professional career in the Paterson school system as an elementary school teacher and coach. He was later a vice principal and then a principal. In 1972, Napier was appointed Assistant Superintendent of the Paterson school district. In 1976, he became the first African-American to be superintendent of the Paterson school district. He was ousted as superintendent in 1991.

He served as an adjunct professor at William Paterson University. He was also a counselor for the Passaic County Community College EOF Program. Napier was a member of the Association for Supervision and Curriculum Development. He was also a member of the William Paterson College Alumni Association. Napier was also a life member of the Paterson branch of the NAACP and the District Chairman of the Passaic Boy Scouts of America.

Napier was Baptist. He was married to Margaret E. Nottingham and they had three children: David, Darren and Dina. Napier died on October 28, 2002, at the age of 67. The cause of death was respiratory failure.

There is a school, Dr. Frank Napier, Jr. School of Technology, that is named after him.
