= Talitha Diggs =

American sprinter (born 2002)

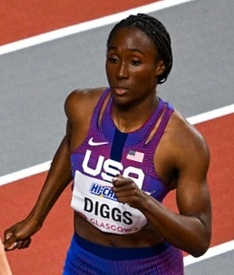
- Diggs at the 2024 World Indoor Championships

Personal information
- Born: Talitha LaNae Clark Diggs; August 22, 2002 (age 24) New Brunswick, New Jersey, U.S.
- Height: 5 ft 9 in (175 cm)
- Weight: 135 lb (61 kg)

Sport
- Country: United States
- Sport: Track and field
- Event: 400 meters
Medal record
Women's athletics
Representing the United States
World Championships
Gold medal – first place	2022 Eugene	4 × 400 m relay
World Indoor Championships
Silver medal – second place	2024 Glasgow	4 × 400 m relay

Talitha LaNae Clark Diggs (born August 22, 2002) is an American track and field athlete, world champion, and professional Adidas athlete, known for her performance as a 400-meter runner. While at the University of Florida, Talitha won multiple NCAA championships, including the 2022 NCAA Outdoor and Indoor 400 m titles. She is also a USA Champion, World Champion, multi-time SEC Champion, and two-time NCAA Academic Athlete of the Year.

Talitha's is the daughter of four-time Olympian Joetta Clark and the granddaughter of the late Dr. Joe L. Clark, the educator who inspired the movie Lean on Me. Other notable relatives includes aunts Hazel Clark, a three-time Olympian, and Jearl Miles-Clark, a five-time Olympian, as well as uncle JJ Clark, who served as head coach of Team USA at the 2004 Olympic Games.

During her collegiate career, Talitha competed in both individual events and relays, winning multiple SEC and NCAA titles. She also received SEC Academic Athlete of the Year and NCAA Academic Athlete of the Year honors.

In December 2024, Talitha graduated summa cum laude with dual degrees in International Studies and political science, a minor in Asian Studies, and proficiency in Spanish and Mandarin.

== Career ==
Diggs won the 400 meters race at the 2022 USA Outdoor Track and Field Championships to qualify for the 2022 World Athletics Championships held in Eugene, Oregon. Prior to this, she won the 2022 NCAA Outdoor championship and NCAA indoor championship representing the University of Florida. She was the second woman in NCAA history to win the USA championships, and NCAA outdoor and indoor championships in the same season. She was the fifth-fastest collegiate 400m runner in history at the time having run 49.99 to win the NCAA Outdoor Championships.

On February 25 at the SEC Indoor Championships in Fayetteville, Arkansas, Diggs broke the North American and NCAA indoor 400 m records with a time of 50.15 seconds, putting her joint eighth on the respective world all-time list. Previous NCAA record of 50.33 s was set just 90 minutes earlier by Rhasidat Adeleke.

Competing at the 2023 USA Outdoor Track and Field Championships, in Eugene, Oregon, she finished third in the final of the 400 m. She was selected for the 2023 World Athletics Championships in Budapest in August 2023.

Selected for the 2024 World Athletics Indoor Championships in Glasgow, she qualified for the final of the women's 400 meters where she finished in fifth place. She was part of the 4 × 400 m relay team which won the silver medal in Glasgow.

She was runner-up over 400 meters at the 2024 Diamond League Shanghai on 27 April 2024.

== Personal life ==
Her mother Joetta Clark Diggs also represented her country at athletics in major championships between 1988 and 2002, including four Olympic Games. She is the niece of both Hazel Clark and two-time Olympic 4 × 400 m champion and American 800 meters record holder Jearl Miles Clark.

== Achievements ==
=== Circuit performances ===
Grand Slam Track results
Slam	Race group	Event	Pl.	Time	Prize money
2025 Kingston Slam	Long sprints	200 m	5th	23.30	US$12,500
2025 Kingston Slam	Long sprints	400 m	7th	52.05	US$12,500

=== National and NCAA titles ===
- USA Outdoor Track and Field Championships
  - 400 meters: 2022
- NCAA Division I Women's Outdoor Track and Field Championships
  - 400 meters: 2022
- NCAA Division I Women's Indoor Track and Field Championships
  - 400 meters: 2022

=== Personal bests ===
- 60 meters indoor – 7.15 (Fayetteville, AR 2023)

- 100 meters – 11.27 (+1.8 m/s, Baton Rouge, LA 2022)
- 200 meters – 22.64 (+0.2 m/s, Oxford, MS 2022)
  - 200 meters indoor – 22.61 (Fayetteville, AR 2023)
- 400 meters – 49.93 (Eugene, OR 2023)
  - 400 meters indoor – 50.15 (Fayetteville, AR 2023) North American record, =8th all time
