= School of Information Technology =

School of Information Technology may refer to:

- School of Information Technology, Nanyang Polytechnic. a post-secondary education institution in Singapore
- School of Information Technology, King Mongkut's University of Technology Thonburi, in Thailand
- School of Information Technology, Shinawatra University, in Pathum Thani province, Thailand
- School of Information Technology (New Jersey), a four-year public high school in Paterson, U.S.
