= School of Architecture and Construction Trades =

Magnet high school in Passaic County, New Jersey, United States

Location
- 61-127 Preakness Avenue; Paterson, Passaic County, New Jersey 07502; United States
- Coordinates: 40.91534°N 74.18705°W

Information
- Type: Public high school
- School district: Paterson Public Schools
- NCES School ID: 341269003171
- Principal: Dewitt Evering
- Faculty: 48.5 FTEs
- Grades: 9-12
- Enrollment: 583 (as of 2020–21)
- Student to teacher ratio: 12.0:1
- Website: act-pps-nj.schoolloop.com

The School of Architecture and Construction Trades is a four-year public high school in Paterson in Passaic County, New Jersey, United States, operated as part of the Paterson Public Schools. It is one of a number of academy programs serving students in ninth through twelfth grades based at the John F. Kennedy High School campus.

As of the 2020–21 school year, the school had an enrollment of 583 students and 48.5 classroom teachers (on an FTE basis), for a student–teacher ratio of 12.0:1. There were 316 students (54.2% of enrollment) eligible for free lunch and none eligible for reduced-cost lunch.

== Awards, recognition and rankings ==
The school was the 330th-ranked public high school in New Jersey out of 339 schools statewide in New Jersey Monthly magazine's September 2014 cover story on the state's "Top Public High Schools", using a new ranking methodology.

== Administration ==
The school's principal is Dewitt Evering.
