= School of Business, Technology, Marketing and Finance =

Magnet high school in Passaic County, New Jersey, United States

Location
- 61-127 Preakness Avenue; Paterson, Foo County, New Jersey 07502; United States
- Coordinates: 40.91534°N 74.18705°W

Information
- Type: Public high school
- School district: Paterson Public Schools
- NCES School ID: 341269003170
- Principal: Jorge Osorio
- Faculty: 47.0 FTEs
- Grades: 9-12
- Enrollment: 627 (as of 2020–21)
- Student to teacher ratio: 13.3:1
- Website: btmf-pps-nj.schoolloop.com

The School of Business, Technology, Marketing and Finance is a four-year public high school in Paterson in Passaic County, New Jersey, United States, operated as part of the Paterson Public Schools. It is one of a number of academy programs serving students in ninth through twelfth grades based at the John F. Kennedy High School campus.

As of the 2020–21 school year, the school had an enrollment of 627 students and 47.0 classroom teachers (on an FTE basis), for a student–teacher ratio of 13.3:1. There were 342 students (54.5% of enrollment) eligible for free lunch and none eligible for reduced-cost lunch.

== Awards, recognition and rankings ==
The school was the 332nd-ranked public high school in New Jersey out of 339 schools statewide in New Jersey Monthly magazine's September 2014 cover story on the state's "Top Public High Schools", using a new ranking methodology.
