= School of Culinary Arts, Hospitality and Tourism =

Magnet high school in Passaic County, New Jersey, United States

Location
- 150 Park Avenue; Paterson, Passaic County, New Jersey 07501; United States
- Coordinates: 40.915098°N 74.160061°W

Information
- Type: Public high school
- School district: Paterson Public Schools
- NCES School ID: 341269003103
- Principal: Andre McCollum Sr.
- Faculty: 49.0 FTEs
- Grades: 9-12
- Enrollment: 653 (as of 2020–21)
- Student to teacher ratio: 13.3:1
- Website: cahts-pps-nj.schoolloop.com

The School of Culinary Arts, Hospitality and Tourism is a four-year public high school in Paterson in Passaic County, New Jersey, United States, operated as part of the Paterson Public Schools. It is one of a number of academy programs serving students in ninth through twelfth grades based at the Eastside High School campus.

As of the 2020–21 school year, the school had an enrollment of 653 students and 49.0 classroom teachers (on an FTE basis), for a student–teacher ratio of 13.3:1. There were 395 students (60.5% of enrollment) eligible for free lunch and 8 (1.2% of students) eligible for reduced-cost lunch.

== Awards, recognition and rankings ==
The school was the 338th-ranked public high school in New Jersey out of 339 schools statewide in New Jersey Monthly magazine's September 2014 cover story on the state's "Top Public High Schools", using a new ranking methodology.

== Administration ==
The school's principal is Andre McCollum Sr. His core administration team includes a vice principal.
