= Joetta Clark Diggs =

American track and field athlete (born 1962)

Personal information
- Born: August 1, 1962 (age 64) Newark, New Jersey, United States

Sport
- Sport: Track and field
Medal record
Representing United States
World Indoor Championships
Bronze medal – third place	1993 Toronto	800 metres
Pan American Junior Athletics Championships
Gold medal – first place	1980 Sudbury	800 metres
Summer Universiade
Bronze medal – third place	1985 Kobe	4x400m relay
Bronze medal – third place	1987 Zagreb	800 metres

Joetta Clark Diggs (née Clark, born August 1, 1962) is an American retired track and field champion, specializing in middle distance running. She ran for more than 28 consecutive years never missing an indoor or outdoor season, with her races being in the 800 meters and 1500 meters. A 4-time Olympian in 1988, 1992, 1996 and 2000, she competed in every outdoor USA Championships or Olympic trials between 1979 and 2000, winning five outdoor championships. Indoors, she was in the national championship race in 18 of the last 19 years, winning seven times. Clark Diggs was ranked in the top 10 in the world since 1991. Moreover, in 1998 at age 36, she was ranked number four in the world. This was her best ranking out of six such appearances.

Coached by Terry Crawford at the University of Tennessee, Clark Diggs left Knoxville with nine collegiate titles (including relays) and a degree in public relations.

Clark Diggs was coached by her brother, J.J. Clark, who is the former women's coach at the University of Tennessee. J.J. also coached two other 800m runners: his wife, Jearl Miles Clark, and his younger sister, Hazel Clark. Hazel, Jearl and Joetta were all ranked #1 in America at one point in time. This Clark Team is known as the First Family of Track & Field because of their 800m dominance. At the 2000 Olympic Trials the family pulled off a remarkable sweep of the three Olympic qualifying positions with Hazel winning, Jearl second and Joetta making her final Olympic team at age 38 in third. She was the second oldest female Olympic track team member that year and the fifth oldest of all time. She was the team captain in 2000. She is the oldest ever to qualify in a track running event.

Later she added a graduate degree in recreation administration. Like her father, educator Joe Louis Clark did, she now works the lecture circuit.

== Personal life ==
Raised in the South Ward of Newark, New Jersey, she lived there during the 1967 riots. Living in South Orange, New Jersey, she attended Columbia High School, where she started her career in track and field, winning the state Meet of Champions in all four years.

She has a husband, Ronald Diggs, who is a businessman, and a daughter, Talitha LaNae Clark Diggs, who was the 2014 USATF | Hershey National Champion in the long jump and 2019 Pennsylvania State Champion at 200 and 400 meters as a high school junior.

== Career ==
She added a graduate degree in recreation administration.

In June 1997, she was appointed by NJ Governor Christine Todd Whitman as one of eight commissioners of the New Jersey Sports and Exposition Authority, where she is responsible for helping to ensure that the Meadowlands Sports Complex continues to serve as a national and international model for sports, racing entertainment and exposition industries.

Clark Diggs was chosen as Sports Illustrated Hometown Hero for her work with youth, and in 1998 she also received the Visa Humanitarian award for her involvement with children. In October, Clark Diggs received the New Jersey Pioneer Women of the 90s Award. Moreover, because of her longevity, and consistency, she is considered by sports enthusiasts as "America's most successful middle distance runner" ever.

A motivational and personal inspiration speaker, Clark Diggs is the daughter of Jetta Clark and noted educator Dr. Joe Clark. Joe Clark was the subject of the movie Lean on Me. Clark Diggs has continued to use her talents and experiences in sports, marketing, consulting and public speaking to provide services to her community, state and nation. As President of Joetta Sports & Beyond, LLC, Clark Diggs delivers messages of health, fitness and empowerment to corporations, colleges, medical programs and civic organizations on the lecture circuit. She is the author of Joetta's "P" Principles for Success, Life Lessons Learned From Track & Field and the executive director of the Joetta Clark Diggs Sports Foundation, which promotes involvement with physical activities for school-aged children and provides opportunities for children in the sports and entertainment industry.

Feb 2025: Joetta won the women's age-60 200 meter dash at the USATF Masters Indoor Track and Field Championship. Her mark was faster than the existing Masters age-60 indoor record.

== Honors ==
- Inducted into the New Jersey Hall of Fame, Class of 2013
- Author, Joetta's "P" Principles for Success: Life Lessons Learned from Track & Field
- Selected by the Star Ledger, which is NJ State's Paper
- As the Women Athlete of the Century
- 2000 Women Olympic Team Captain
- Inducted into the USA Track & Field Hall of Fame 2009
- Inducted into Penn Relays Hall of Fame – 2004
- Inducted into the University of Tennessee's Hall of Fame
- Chosen as Sports Illustrated Hometown Hero
- Received the VISA Humanitarian Award
- Undefeated in the 800m all four years while at Columbia High School
- 15- time All American
- 9-Time NCAA Champion
- 11-Time USA National Champion
- Selected to Who's Who of American Women – 2000
- Received New Jersey Pioneer of the 90s Award
- Inducted into Millrose Games Hall of Fame at Madison Square Garden – 2002
- Featured on MSNBC News Broadcast
- Featured on CNN
- Featured in Jet Magazine
- Featured in Women's Sports and Fitness Magazine
- Featured Documentary on Madison Square Garden Network
- Distinguished Honoree Award-Somerset County Commission on Status of Women – 2001
- Received Key to the City of Newark – 1990
- New Jersey Scholastic Coaches Association Distinguished Award – 2001
- Rolling Hills Girl Scouts Women of Achievement Award
- Board Member of the Raritan Valley Community College 2001
- Board Member of the Business Partnership of Somerset County
