= Paterson School District =

Paterson School District can refer to:

- Paterson School District (Washington)
- Paterson Public Schools (Paterson, New Jersey)
