= John F. Kennedy High School (Paterson, New Jersey) =

High school in Passaic County, New Jersey, US

John F. Kennedy Educational Complex ACT, BTMF, SET and STEM

Location
- 61-127 Preakness Avenue; Paterson, Passaic County, New Jersey 07522; United States
- 40°54′52″N 74°11′15″W

Information
- Type: Public high school
- Established: 1965
- School district: Paterson Public Schools
- NCES School ID: 341269003171
- Principal: JoAnne Riviello
- Faculty: 138.0 FTEs
- Grades: 9–12
- Enrollment: 1,846 (as of 2024–25)
- Student to teacher ratio: 13.4:1
- Colors: Red and black
- Athletics conference: Big North Conference (general); North Jersey Super Football Conference (football)
- Team name: Knights
- Rival: Eastside High School
- Website: jfk.paterson.k12.nj.us

John F. Kennedy Educational Complex (or John F. Kennedy High School) is a four-year public high school in Paterson, United States, that serves the western section of Paterson. Kennedy High School, which serves students in ninth through twelfth grade, is a part of the Paterson Public Schools. 93% of the students are of minority races, and a majority of them speak either a non-English language at home or are very limited in English. The school uses the Infinite Campus school management system for tasks such as student attendance and grading, and full online grade access is available online.

In 2011, the school was split into theme schools, with four smaller academies operating within the high school, in order to give students a choice in areas they wanted to pursue. These schools are:

- School of Architecture and Construction Trades (ACT)
- School of Business, Technology, Marketing and Finance (BTMF)
- School of Education and Training (SET)
- School of Science, Technology, Engineering and Mathematics (STEM)

The school has been accredited by the Middle States Association of Colleges and Schools Commission on Elementary and Secondary Schools since 1928. It has suffered low rankings when it comes to official lists of top public schools in New Jersey, as well as accusations of violence and poor conduct by the school's instructors and the Paterson Education Association.

As of the 2024–25 school year, the school had an enrollment of 1,846 students and 138.0 classroom teachers (on an FTE basis), for a student–teacher ratio of 13.4:1. There were 1,089 students (59.0% of enrollment) eligible for free lunch and 22 (1.2% of students) eligible for reduced-cost lunch.

== History ==
The school was constructed at a cost of $7 million (equivalent to $71.5 million in 2025) and named in memory of President John F. Kennedy. The school opened with an enrollment of 2,800 and could accommodate up to 3,500 students.

== Demographics and achievement ==
Kennedy High School is 54% Hispanic of various Latin American nationalities, 34% Black, 7% White American, and 5% Asian. 35% of the school speaks Spanish in their homes, 3% speak Bengali, 2% speak Arabic, 2% speak Turkish, 0.2% speak Italian and 0.1% speak Albanian. There are also limited English proficient students or LEPs who compose 11% of the school. Limited English Proficient students cannot speak, read, or write in English. 50% of the students participate in the free or reduced price lunch program. The average class size is 25 students, excluding special education. The school's ratio of computers to students is 7 to 1 while the state average is 4 to 1.

Based on data from the 2010 New Jersey School Report Card, on the Language Arts section of the High School Proficiency Assessment (HSPA), 2010 graduates scored 43.3% proficient and 55.6% scored partial. On the Math section of the test, 28.5% scored proficient and 69.4% scored partial. The average SAT score is 1139 out of 2400. The Advanced Placement (AP) participation rate is 4.6%. The average attendance rate is 87.2%. As of the 2010 school year, Kennedy High School had a suspension rate of 47%. 71.1% of John F. Kennedy High School seniors graduated. Roughly 20.0% of the graduating seniors planned to go on to four-year colleges and another 49.3% of the graduating seniors go on to two year colleges.

The student to faculty ratio is 7.3 to 1. The faculty gets paid $56,733 a year while the state average is $61,840. The administrators get paid $108,105 as the state average is $117,895.

The school is in a "special needs" or one of the Abbott Districts. The district receives 82% of its budget from the state and spends an average of $16,575 per pupil.

The school is home to the JFK Robotics/College Prep Team. To join, one must have a GPA of 3.5; have a desire to go to college, be motivated and most of all respectful to teachers and fellow students, though less than 1% make it into the team. The sole purpose of the program designed by teachers and staff is to get every child to college. While its membership is limited to only high achievers in terms of grades and merit, the team recruits from every academy in the school. Numbering around 25 students the team is filled with children that are given extra educational work and enrichment programs to boost their chances in getting into college, with the opportunity to participate in Upward Bound programs, to college credit classes at Passaic County Community College.

== Athletics ==
The John F. Kennedy High School Knights compete in the Big North Conference, which is comprised of public and private high schools in Bergen and Passaic counties, and was established following a reorganization of sports leagues in Northern New Jersey by the New Jersey State Interscholastic Athletic Association. For the 2009–10 season, the school competed in the North Jersey Tri-County Conference, an interim conference established to facilitate realignment. Prior to that, the school had previously participated in Division C of the Northern New Jersey Interscholastic League (NNJIL), an athletic conference consisting of public and private high schools located in Bergen County and Passaic County. With 2,478 students in grades 10-12, the school was classified by the NJSIAA for the 2019–20 school year as Group IV for most athletic competition purposes, which included schools with an enrollment of 1,060 to 5,049 students in that grade range. The football team competes in the Liberty Blue division of the North Jersey Super Football Conference, which includes 112 schools competing in 20 divisions, making it the nation's biggest football-only high school sports league. The school was classified by the NJSIAA as Group V North for football for 2024–2026, which included schools with 1,317 to 5,409 students.

The football team won the North I Group IV state sectional championships in 1987 with a 13–7 win against Bayonne High School, finishing the season undefeated for the first time. Kennedy plays an annual Thanksgiving Day football game against Eastside High School. The days leading up to the game are filled with school spirit as the Knights and Ghosts prepare to face off. Not only do the football players practice, but so do the band, cheerleaders, and color guard of both schools. In 2011, Eastside won the 87th annual match-up between the two schools by a score of 17–12. NJ.com listed the rivalry at 21st on its 2017 list "Ranking the 31 fiercest rivalries in N.J. HS football", with Kennedy leading the series by a 43-42-7 margin.

The girls' basketball team won the Group IV state championship in 1988 (defeating Neptune High School in the tournament final) and 1990 (vs. Toms River East High School). The 1988 team became the first girls team from the county to win a state title and finished the season with a 31-0 record after winning the Group IV championship game by a score of 65-55 against a Neptune team that came into the finals without a loss. The 1990 team won the Group IV title with an 80-49 win against Toms River East in the championship game and advanced to the second annual Tournament of Champions as the top seed, defeated fourth-seed Sterling High School by 75-49 in the semis and went on to win the championship with a 70-47 win against second-seeded and previously unbeaten St. John Vianney High School in the finals at the Rutgers Athletic Center to finish the season with a record of 31-2. The team won the 2001 North I, Group IV state sectional championship with a 61–50 win over Bayonne High School in the tournament final.

The boys' soccer team won the 1996 North I, Group IV state sectional championship against Wayne Hills High School 4–5 on penalties and won the league and county titles in 1997.

== Administration ==
The school's principal is JoAnne Riviello. Core members of the school's administration include the four vice principals,

== Criticisms ==
In 2014, The Record writer Hannan Adely wrote that, since John F. Kennedy High School is an inner city school, it has faced problems of violence and other unmonitored hallway misbehavior from students. Accusations about mayhem at the school have come from not only its teachers and students but also representatives at the Paterson Education Association, including its former president, Peter Tirri,

In February 2008, John F. Kennedy instructors and the Paterson Education Association filed a complaint against the school to the New Jersey Department of Labor and Workforce Development's Office of Public Employee Safety, citing lack of discipline on students using vulgar language towards personnel, physically assaulting teachers, urinating in non-bathroom areas, and protesting the school's schedules by pulling fire alarms. In 2014, Ted McNulty, a former metal shop teacher who retired from the school in July 2014, has expressed his testimonies through interviews by sources such as the talk show Chasing News and education reform news service Choice Media; and a book he wrote and self-published on January 11, 2017 titled RUINING a NATION and Nobody Cares. Superintendent officials have denied McNulty's claims.

The school has been in the very bottom of lists ranking New Jersey's top public schools. In New Jersey Monthly magazine's yearly lists of the state's "Top Public High Schools," the school has been ranked 304th out of 328 schools in 2012, 290th out of 322 schools in 2010, 314th out of 316 schools in 2008, and 306th out of 316 schools in 2006. Schooldigger.com ranked the school 375th out of 381 public high schools statewide in its 2010-11 rankings which were based on the combined percentage of students classified as proficient or above proficient on the language arts literacy and mathematics components of the High School Proficiency Assessment (HSPA).

== Notable alumni ==
Alumni of Paterson Central High School, the school's original name, are also included:

- Jorge Acosta (born 1964), retired soccer forward who played professionally and was a member of the U.S. national team in 1991 and 1992
- John Artis (1937-2014), track star who was wrongfully convicted of murder with Rubin Carter
- Eric Downing (born 1978), defensive tackle for the Kansas City Chiefs and San Diego Chargers
- Gerson Echeverry (born 1971), retired soccer forward who played professionally in Major League Soccer, USISL and the National Professional Soccer League
- William Wadsworth Evans (1887–1972), politician who served in the New Jersey General Assembly from 1919 to 1924
- Shotsie Gorman (born 1951, class of 1969), tattoo artist, painter, sculptor and poet
- Kendall Holt (born 1981), former professional boxer who competed from 2001 to 2013 and held the WBO junior welterweight title from 2008 to 2009
- Ron Cephas Jones (born 1957), actor known for This is Us, Mr. Robot and Across The Universe
- Lawrence Francis Kramer (1933–2023), politician who served as the mayor of Paterson from 1967 to 1972 and 1975 until 1982
- Devon McDonald (born 1969), linebacker who played in the NFL for the Indianapolis Colts and Arizona Cardinals
- Gemar Mills, author and speaker, who was the youngest ever principal of Malcolm X Shabazz High School when he took the job at age 27
- Vince Naimoli (1937-2019), businessman who was the first owner of the Major League Baseball team the Tampa Bay Devil Rays
- Frank Napier (1935-2002), former superintendent of the Paterson Public Schools
- Vincent N. Parrillo, professor of sociology at William Paterson University
- Dave Scott (born 1953), former American football offensive lineman who played in the NFL for the Atlanta Falcons
