= School of Government and Public Administration =

Magnet high school in Passaic County, New Jersey, United States

Location
- 150 Park Avenue; Paterson, Passaic County, New Jersey 07501; United States
- Coordinates: 40.915098°N 74.160061°W

Information
- Type: Public high school
- School district: Paterson Public Schools
- NCES School ID: 341269003105
- Principal: Andre McCollum Sr."
- Faculty: 48.0 FTEs
- Grades: 9-12
- Enrollment: 695 (as of 2020–21)
- Student to teacher ratio: 14.5:1
- Website: gopa-pps-nj.schoolloop.com

The School of Government and Public Administration is a four-year public high school in Paterson in Passaic County, New Jersey, United States, operated as part of the Paterson Public Schools. It is one of a number of academy programs serving students in ninth through twelfth grades based at the Eastside High School campus.

As of the 2020–21 school year, the school had an enrollment of 695 students and 48.0 classroom teachers (on an FTE basis), for a student–teacher ratio of 14.5:1. There were 379 students (54.5% of enrollment) eligible for free lunch and none eligible for reduced-cost lunch.

== Awards, recognition and rankings ==
The school was the 315th-ranked public high school in New Jersey out of 339 schools statewide in New Jersey Monthly magazine's September 2014 cover story on the state's "Top Public High Schools", using a new ranking methodology, after being ranked 305th in the state in 2012.

== Administration ==
The school's principal is Andre McCollum Sr. His administration team includes the vice principal.
