= William W. Evans Jr. =

American politician

New Jersey State Assemblyman
- In office January 1960 – January 1961
- Preceded by: Clara K. Bivona
- Succeeded by: Nelson G. Gross

Personal details
- Born: William Wadsworth Evans Jr. May 6, 1921 Paterson, New Jersey, U.S.
- Died: August 19, 1999 (aged 78) Stuart, Florida, U.S.
- Party: Republican
- Spouse: Marie Archbold Evans
- Parent(s): William Wadsworth Evans; Isabel Urquhart Blauvelt Evans
- Education: University of Virginia, University of Miami School of Law
- Profession: Lawyer

William Wadsworth Evans Jr. (May 6, 1921 – August 19, 1999) was an American Republican Party politician who served in the New Jersey General Assembly from 1960 to 1962 and was a candidate for the Republican nomination for president in 1968.

== Early life ==
Evans was born in Paterson, New Jersey, on May 6, 1921, the son of Assemblyman William Wadsworth Evans (1886–1972) and Isabel Urquhart Blauvelt (1892–1967). Raised in Paterson and Franklin Lakes, New Jersey, Evans attended Newark Academy, Lawrenceville School and Eastside High School. He was a graduate of the University of Virginia and the University of Miami School of Law. He served in the U.S. Marines during World War II. Evans was elected Mayor of Wyckoff, New Jersey in the 1950s.

== New Jersey Assemblyman ==
He was elected to the New Jersey General Assembly in 1959. He was the top vote-getter in the 1959 election, receiving 141,222 votes countywide to win one of Bergen County's six Assembly seats. He beat his closest Democratic rival by 33,381 votes. He was not a candidate for re-election to a second term in 1961.

Evans took two months off from his law firm in 1960 to work on Richard Nixon's 1960 presidential campaign. He had been the co-chairman of Barry Goldwater's New Jersey campaign in 1964.

== Presidential candidate ==
On September 16, 1967, Evans announced that he would seek the Republican nomination for president in 1968. He said by entering the New Hampshire primary, he would seek to use his candidacy as a platform to expound upon his opposition to the Vietnam War and seek to pressure other candidates to clarify their views on Vietnam. Evans "campaigned extensively, visiting the offices of nearly every newspaper in the state." A New York Times story on the New Hampshire primary in January showed a picture of an Evans for President billboard at the south end of Main Street in Concord, which the newspaper said was the first billboard of the campaign. Evans received just 151 votes statewide.

== Later life ==
He was married to Marie Archbold Evans (1923–2012) and had five children. He retired from the practice of law in the early 1980s and moved to Florida. Evans died in Stuart, Florida, in 1999 at the age of 78.
