= Adrienne Mancia =

American film curator (1927–2022)

Adrienne Phyllis Mancia (June 5, 1927 – December 11, 2022) was an American film curator best known for her work with the Museum of Modern Art and the Brooklyn Academy of Music.

Born in Brooklyn as Adrienne Phyllis Johnson, she was raised in Paterson, New Jersey, and graduated from Eastside High School in her hometown in 1944, before attending the University of Wisconsin and Columbia University.

Mancia joined the Museum of Modern Art as a secretary in 1964. She had the opportunity to prepare exhibitions and was promoted from assistant curator and given the title as the museum's film curator in 1977. She held that position until 1998. In that role, she helped introduce American audiences to films by directors including Manoel de Oliveira and Wim Wenders. Some of her exhibitions at the Museum of Modern Art was a retrospective of works from American International Pictures and of Warner Brothers cartoon characters. She joined the Brooklyn Academy of Music, she was the curator-at-large for the organization's BAM Rose Cinemas.

A resident of Manhattan, Mancia died in Teaneck, New Jersey, on December 11, 2022, at the age of 95.
