= Riff (group) =

American R&B/soul a cappella group

Riff is an American R&B and soul a cappella group from Paterson, New Jersey. The group RIFF appeared in the 1989 biographical-drama film, Lean on Me starring Morgan Freeman as the 'Songbirds' in the bathroom scene. They recorded two albums in the 1990s. Three of the members (Anthony Fuller, Dwayne Jones, and Michael Best) joined Men of Vizion but have since returned and the group has re-formed with two new members. They are still performing and making songs.

== Members ==
Current members

- Michael Best
- Steven Capers
- Anthony Fuller
- Delvis Damon
- André Lamar

Former members

- Kenny "Damn" Kelly (December 24, 1969 – July 31, 2016)
- Dwayne Jones
- Kenny J. Wilkins

== Discography ==
=== Albums ===
- Riff (SBK, 1991) US #177, US R&B #41
- To Whom it May Concern (ERG, 1993)

=== Singles ===
Year	Title	Chart positions					Certifications
Year	Title	US	US R&B/HH	US AC	AUS	NZ	Certifications
1991	"My Heart Is Failing Me"	25	6	29	—	4	
1991	"If You're Serious"	88	7	—	—	—	
1991	"Everytime My Heart Beats"	—	26	—	—	22	
1991	"It's Wonderful"	—	—	—	—	—	
1991	"I Can't Believe We Just Met"	—	—	—	—	—	
1991	"Little Girls"	—	—	—	—	—	
1992	"White Men Can't Jump"	90	41	—	6	1	ARIA: Gold
1993	"Judy Had a Boyfriend"	—	91	—	—	—	
1994	"Baby It's Yours"	—	65	—	—	—	
2015	"Perfect 10"	—	—	—	—	—	
2016	"Sorry"	—	—	—	—	—	
2017	"Say the Word"	—	—	—	—	—	
2019	"When You Love"	—	—	—	—	—	
2021	"On This Day"	—	—	—	—	—	
