= Eastside High School (Paterson, New Jersey) =

High school in Passaic County, New Jersey, US

Location
- 150 Park Avenue; Paterson, Passaic County, New Jersey 07501; United States; 40.915048°N 74.160167°W

Information
- Type: Public; Secondary
- Established: 1926
- School district: Paterson Public Schools
- NCES School ID: 341269004866
- Principal: Dorothy P. Dougé
- Faculty: 130.0 FTEs
- Grades: 9–12
- Enrollment: 2,073 (as of 2024–25)
- Student to teacher ratio: 16.0:1
- Colors: Navy Blue; Orange
- Athletics conference: Big North Conference (general); North Jersey Super Football Conference (football)
- Team name: Ghosts
- Rival: Kennedy High School
- Website: ehs.paterson.k12.nj.us

Eastside High School (or EHS) is a four–year public high school located in Paterson section of Passaic County, in the U.S. state of New Jersey, that serves the eastern section of Paterson. EHS, which serves ninth through twelfth grade students, operates as part of the Paterson Public Schools. The school has been accredited by the Middle States Association of Colleges and Schools Commission on Elementary and Secondary Schools since 1928. Eastside High School opened on February 1, 1926.

As of the 2024–25 school year, the school had an enrollment of 2,073 students and 130.0 classroom teachers (on an FTE basis), for a student–teacher ratio of 16.0:1. There were 1,183 students (57.1% of enrollment) eligible for free lunch and 26 (1.3% of students) eligible for reduced-cost lunch.

The school mascot—the Ghosts—derives from the location of Eastside's football field, where a nineteenth-century cemetery once stood. A May 1927 article in The Paterson Evening News refers to the Eastside team as the "Galloping Ghosts".

== History ==
The school building, completed at a cost of $1.5 million (equivalent to $27.3 million in 2025), was dedicated in formal ceremonies in January 1926. The school opened to students the next month, with students moving over from Central High School (since renamed as John F. Kennedy High School) to the new school facility.

== Schools ==
The Eastside campus hosted three separate academy programs that operate independently but this is no longer the case:

- School of Culinary Arts, Hospitality and Tourism
  - Andre S. McCollum, Principal
- School of Government and Public Administration
  - Andre S. McCollum, Principal of Instruction
  - Edgard Nieves, Principal of Operations
- School of Information Technology
  - Andre S. McCollum, Principal of Instruction

== Awards, recognition and rankings ==
The school was the 311th-ranked public high school in New Jersey out of 316 schools statewide, in New Jersey Monthly magazine's September 2008 cover story on the state's Top Public High Schools. The school was ranked 309th in the magazine's September 2006 issue, which surveyed 316 schools across the state. Schooldigger.com ranked the school 370th out of 376 public high schools statewide in its 2009-10 rankings which were based on the combined percentage of students classified as proficient or above proficient on the language arts literacy and mathematics components of the High School Proficiency Assessment (HSPA).

== Demographics and achievement ==
EHS is 55% Hispanic of various Latin American nationalities, 43% Black, 2% White. 37% of the school speaks Spanish in their homes while another 32% speaks another language other than English. There are also limited English proficiency students or LEPs who compose 12% of the school. Limited English Proficient students cannot speak, read, or write in English and are placed in "bilingual" classes. 45% of the students participate in the free or reduced price lunch program. The average class size is 39 students, excluding special education. The school's ratio of students to computers is 9 to 1, with the state average being 4 to 1.

On the Language Arts section of the High School Proficiency Assessment (HSPA), 51% scored proficient and 46% scored partial. On the Math section of the test, 39% scored proficient and 57% scored partial. The average SAT score is 736 out of 1600. The Advanced Placement Program (AP) participation is 2%. The average attendance rate is 87%. As of the 2004–05 school year, EHS had a suspension rate of 10%. 60% of Eastside High School seniors graduated. 71% of the school graduated via the SRA process and 10% graduated through the LEP SRA process. Roughly 38% of the graduating seniors go on to four-year colleges and another 34% of the graduating seniors go on to two-year college. The faculty gets paid $46,500 a year while the state average is $52,563. The administrators get paid $105,000; the state average is $102,755. Since the school is in a "special needs" or one of the Abbott Districts, the district receives almost 85% of its budget from the state.

== Athletics ==
The Eastside High School Ghosts compete in the Big North Conference, a super conference composed of public and private high schools in Bergen and Passaic counties that operates under the supervision of the New Jersey State Interscholastic Athletic Association (NJSIAA) and was established following a reorganization of sports leagues in Northern New Jersey. For the 2009–10 season, the school competed in the North Jersey Tri-County Conference, an interim conference established to facilitate the forthcoming realignment. Until the NJSIAA's 2009 realignment, the school had participated in Division B of the Northern New Jersey Interscholastic League, which included high schools located in Bergen, Essex and Passaic counties, and was separated into three divisions based on NJSIAA size classification. With 2,304 students in grades 10–12, the school was classified by the NJSIAA for the 2019–20 school year as Group IV for most athletic competition purposes, which included schools with an enrollment of 1,060 to 5,049 students in that grade range. The football team competes in the Liberty Blue division of the North Jersey Super Football Conference, which includes 112 schools competing in 20 divisions, making it the nation's biggest football-only high school sports league. The school was classified by the NJSIAA as Group V North for football for 2024–2026, which included schools with 1,317 to 5,409 students.

Eastside plays an annual Thanksgiving Day football game against Kennedy High School. In 2011, Eastside won the 87th annual match-up between the two schools by a score of 17–12 At the 93rd annual game in 2017, Kennedy defeated Eastside by a score of 16–6 to win their fourth game in a row in the annual rivalry. NJ.com listed the rivalry at 21st on its 2017 list "Ranking the 31 fiercest rivalries in N.J. HS football", with Kennedy leading the series by a 43–42–7 margin.

The boys' bowling team won the overall state championship in 1960.

The Paterson Eastside softball team won the program's first North I Group IV state sectional title in 1981 with a 6-5 win in the championship game against Passaic Valley Regional High School. The team won the Group IV semifinal by a score of 2-1 over Roxbury High School before falling to Lenape High School by a score of 5-4 in the title game played at Mercer County Park.

The boys track team won the spring / outdoor track state championship in Group IV in 1987.

The girls basketball team won the Group IV state championship in 2004 (defeating runner-up Marlboro High School) and 2014 (vs. Shawnee High School). The team won the finals of the Group IV tournament in 2004 with a 43–36 win against Marlboro High School. The team won in Group IV in 2014 with a 60–41 win against Shawnee in the playoff finals.

The boys basketball team won the Group IV state championship in 2011 (against Rancocas Valley Regional High School in the tournament final), 2015 (vs. Cherry Hill High School East) and 2023 (vs. Egg Harbor Township High School). The team won the Group IV title in 2011 with a 56-52 win against Rancocas Valley in the championship game and came into the Tournament of Champions as the fourth seed, and failed to hold an 11-point fourth-quarter lead in the quarterfinals before losing to fifth-seeded Newark Central by a score of 73–67 in overtime to finish the season with a record of 21–9. The team won its second Group IV title in 2015 with a 50–34 win against Cherry Hill East in the tournament final and lost as the third seed in the ToC to number-six Newark Tech High School in the quarterfinals 66–56. The team finished the 2023 season with a 29-2 record after winning the Group IV title with a 52-45 win against Egg Harbor Township High School in the finals.

On May 17, 2023, the Eastside baseball team played Don Bosco Prep in the first baseball game played since 1997 at the renovated Hinchliffe Stadium.

== In popular culture ==
Paterson Eastside High is known for its renaissance in the mid-1980s under the leadership of Joe Clark as principal. The school was depicted in the 1989 film Lean on Me, starring Morgan Freeman as Clark.

Former student, Fetty Wap, filmed the music video for his song "Wake Up" in the school in 2016.

== Notable alumni ==
- Martin G. Barnes (1948–2012, class of 1965), politician who was the city's first African-American mayor
- Jacob Bigeleisen (1919–2010, class of 1935), chemist who worked on the Manhattan Project on techniques to extract uranium-235 from uranium ore
- Glenn Borgmann (born 1950), former professional baseball catcher who played in Major League Baseball for the Minnesota Twins and Chicago White Sox
- Johnny Briggs (born 1944), Major League Baseball player who played for the Phillies, Brewers and Twins
- Essence Carson (born 1986, class of 2004), WNBA basketball player with the New York Liberty and Los Angeles Sparks who attended Rosa L. Parks School of Fine and Performing Arts, while competing athletically at Eastside High School, where she was an all-state volleyball player and state champion in the 400 meters
- Morton Denn (born 1939, class of 1957), rheologist and chemical engineer who is the Albert Einstein Professor Emeritus of Science and Engineering at the City College of New York
- Larry Doby (1923–2003), Baseball Hall of Fame inductee who was the first black player in the American League
- Blessing Ejiofor (born 1998, class of 2017), professional basketball player and Olympian representing Nigeria
- William W. Evans Jr. (1921–1999), politician who served in the New Jersey General Assembly from 1960 to 1962 and was a candidate for the Republican nomination for president in 1968
- Sidney Geist (1914–2005, class of 1931), artist who was known for his sculpture and his art criticism
- Allen Ginsberg (1926–1997, class of 1943), beat poet
- Bob Giraldi (born 1939), film and television director
- Frank X. Graves Jr. (1923–1990), politician who is best known for serving two separate terms as Mayor of Paterson
- Henry Janowitz (1915-2018, class of 1931), Professor Emeritus of Gastroenterology at the Icahn School of Medicine at Mount Sinai, known for his contributions into inflammatory bowel diseases
- Morris Janowitz (1919–1988), sociologist and professor who made major contributions to sociological theory, the study of prejudice, urban issues and patriotism
- Gary Jennings (1928–1999), author of historical novels
- Devhonte Johnson, Brazilian jiu-jitsu competitor and coach
- Shakur Juiston (born 1996), professional basketball player for Aris of the Greek Basket League
- Alvin Kass (1935– 2025), rabbi who was the chief chaplain of the New York City Police Department
- Joseph Keller (1923-2016), mathematician who specialized in applied mathematics, after having competed on Eastside's math team while in high school
- Bernard Kerik (born 1955), former New York City Police Commissioner
- George Lefferts (1921–2018), writer, producer, playwright, poet, and director
- Adrienne Mancia (1927–2022, class of 1944), curator best known for her work with the Museum of Modern Art and the Brooklyn Academy of Music
- Ricardo McDonald (born 1969), NFL linebacker who played for the Cincinnati Bengals and Chicago Bears
- Tony Murphy (born 1957), retired basketball player who led NCAA Division I in scoring in 1979–80 with a 32.1 points per game average for Southern University
- Kenny Parker (born 1946), NFL cornerback for the New York Giants
- Joseph D. Pistone (born 1939), former FBI agent, subject of the film Donnie Brasco
- Robert Pitofsky (1929–2018), lawyer and politician who was the chairman of the Federal Trade Commission from 1995 to 2001
- Paul Plishka (born 1941), principal bass, Metropolitan Opera Company
- Philip A. Schnayerson (born 1940), criminal defense attorney
- James Scott (born 1972), NBA player who played for the Miami Heat in 1996
- Omar Sheika (born 1977), former professional boxer and multiple time super middleweight world title challenger
- Rory Sparrow (born 1958), NBA player
- Henry Taub (1927-2011), businessman and philanthropist who co-founded ADP
- Joe Taub (1929-2017), businessman who joined his brother Henry Taub and Frank Lautenberg in building the payroll company Automatic Data Processing and later was part of an investment group that acquired the New Jersey Nets
- Jeff Van Drew (born 1953), politician who has served as the U.S. representative from New Jersey's 2nd congressional district since 2019
- Fetty Wap (born 1991), recording artist known for hit single "Trap Queen"
- Joseph Weber (1919–2000, class of 1935), physicist, developer of the laser and the gravitational wave detector
- Jane Williams-Warren (born 1947), long-time city clerk, who served from 2017–2018 as the second female African-American mayor of Paterson
- Jerry Zaks (born 1946, class of 1963), stage and television director, and actor
