= Keith Willis =

American football player and coach (born 1959)

No. 93
- Position: Defensive lineman

Personal information
- Born: July 29, 1959 (age 67); Newark, New Jersey, U.S.
- Listed height: 6 ft 1 in (1.85 m)
- Listed weight: 263 lb (119 kg)

Career information
- High school: Shabazz (Newark)
- College: Northeastern

Career history

Playing
- Pittsburgh Steelers (1982–1991); Buffalo Bills (1992); Washington Redskins (1993); New York Jets (1993)

Coaching
- Slippery Rock University (1995–1998) Defensive line coach; University of Cincinnati (1999–2000) Defensive line coach; Boston College (2001–2006) Defensive line coach; North Carolina State (2007–2012) Defensive line coach; Montreal Alouettes (2013–2015) Defensive line coach; Tennessee Titans (2016–2020) Defensive line coach; Edinboro University (2020-2022) Assistant head coach; North Carolina A&T (2022-2023) Defensive line coach & Defensive run coordinator
- Stats at Pro Football Reference

Keith Willis (born July 29, 1959) is an American former football player and coach. He played professionally as a defensive lineman in the National Football League (NFL), primarily for the Pittsburgh Steelers. He finished his coaching career as the defensive line coach and defensive run coordinator for the North Carolina A&T Aggies of the NCAA.

Born and raised in Newark, New Jersey, Willis played prep football at Malcolm X Shabazz High School.
