= Philip A. Schnayerson =

American criminal defense attorney (born 1940)

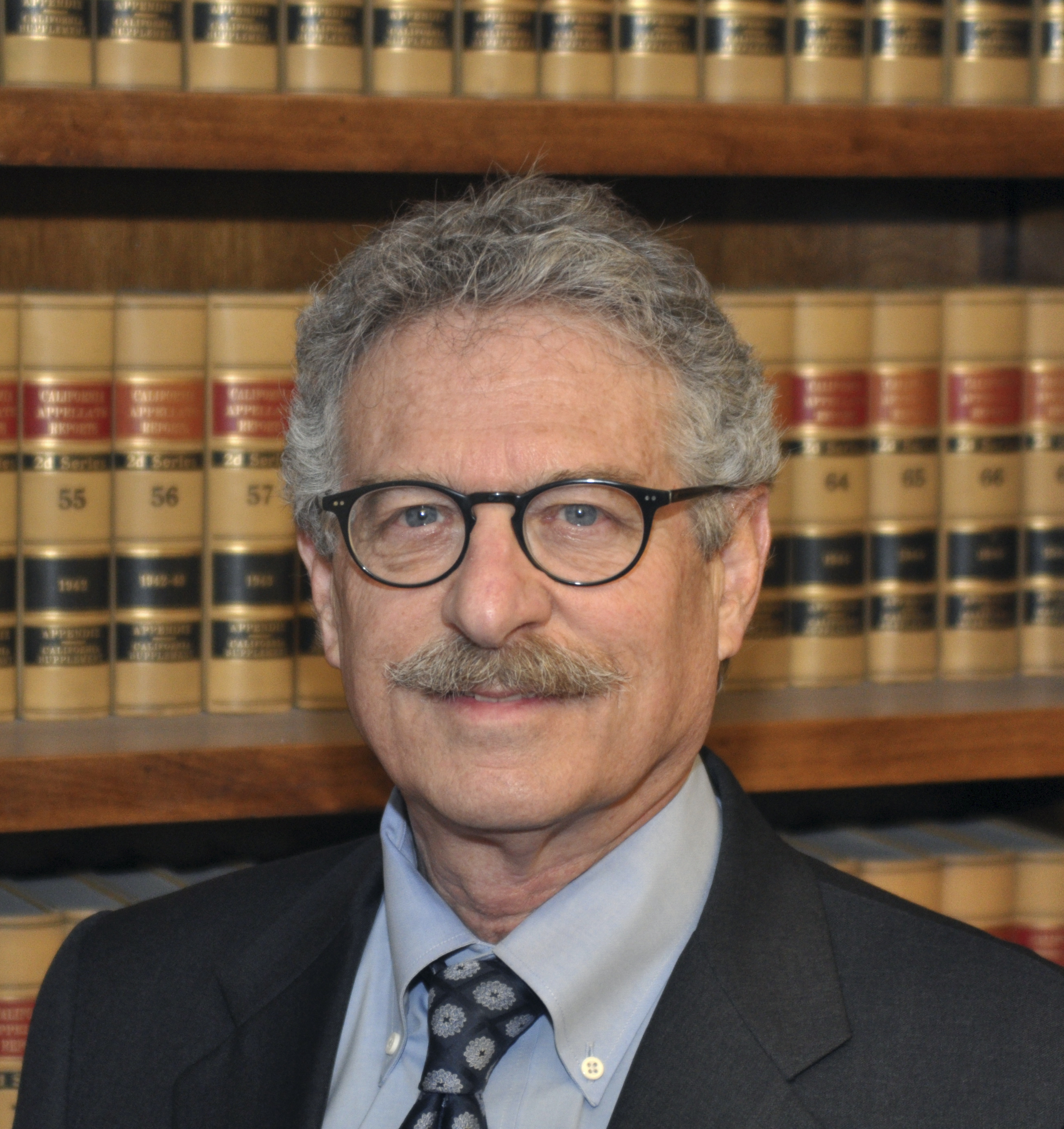
Philip A. Schnayerson

Philip Allen Schnayerson (born October 31, 1940, in Paterson, New Jersey) is an American criminal defense attorney.

== Early life and education ==
Philip A. Schnayerson was born in the industrial town of Paterson, New Jersey, in 1940. He graduated from Paterson East Side High School in 1958, where he was noted in the yearbook as one of the class comedians. Rutgers University, from which he graduated in 1962. He went on to study law at New York University Law School, where he earned his JD in 1965.

== Early legal career ==
In 1965, Schnayerson moved to California to serve as a VISTA volunteer, working in San Francisco on the S.F. Bail Project until 1967. In 1968, he joined a labor law firm but soon left civil law to join the Alameda County Public Defender's Office in 1969. As an Alameda County public defender, Schnayerson defended many University of California students arrested for protesting the Viet Nam War in 1971. In 1976, Schnayerson left the Alameda County office to join the newly created California State Public Defender's Office. While there he worked on appeals, prison trials and serious offender hearings when the determinate sentence law came into effect. He remained in the California State Public Defender's Office until 1978.

== Private practice ==
After leaving the public defender's office, and having become a Certified Criminal Law Specialist, Schnayerson established a private criminal defense practice.

=== Notable cases ===
==== People v Eric Boucher ====
In 1986, the state of California and Los Angeles city attorney, James K. Hahn brought charges of obscenity against Eric Boucher, more commonly known as Jello Biafra, lead singer of the band the Dead Kennedys. The band's recently released album, Frankenchrist, came with a poster of the painting Penis Landscape, by the academy-award-winning Swiss artist, H. R. Giger, whose work Schnayerson argued was "legitimate." Boucher was accused of distributing harmful material to a minor after a complaint from a San Fernando Valley woman whose 14 and 11-year-old children came into possession of the album and poster. The case was concerned with freedom of speech as well as the responsibilities a recording artist might have in creating records for an audience that could include minors. Schnayerson argued that if artists were held liable for any material that might fall into the hands of minors, “that everyone will have to adhere to [that] standard and that adults would be reduced to reading and seeing things that would be acceptable only for minors.” Schnayerson also argued that the poster's intent was not to arouse but to act as sociological commentary. The album bore a sticker with a warning.

The case was dismissed after trial.

===== This American Life episode =====
Act Two of Episode 285 of the popular radio program and podcast, This American Life, entitled “I am Curious, Jello,” features the story of People v Boucher. Schnayerson as defense attorney is described as having “a mastery of the arguments and a sense of humor.” Opposing counsel Michael Guarino describes that as a consequence of Schnayerson's tactics, “the trial became an art and history lesson instead of a discourse about protecting the children,” which worked in favor of the defense. He also stated that it “seemed to feel like [Schnayerson] was on the right side. And that’s not usual, for a prosecutor to be in involved in a case in which the defense attorney has this righteousness.”

The episode originally aired on March 25, 2005.

==== Arguments before the California Court of Appeal ====
===== People v Ormonde (2006) =====
During his initial hearing in trial court, defendant Richard Ormonde pleaded no contest to five counts brought against him, following the court's denial of his motion to suppress evidence. His defense entered a post-plea motion for reconsideration of the ruling on the suppression motion, maintaining that a detective's "warrantless entry and search were invalid under the exigent circumstances exception." This post-plea motion was also denied. The defense petitioned for referral to the California Rehabilitation Center, which the court denied. Ormonde was sentenced to state prison for three years and eight months.

Before the California Court of Appeal, the Attorney General contended that the "initial entry into the defendant’s home was justified by exigent circumstances." Schnayerson, however, argued on Ormonde's behalf that the trial court had made an error in "denying the defendant’s motion to suppress an invalid sweep and abused its discretion in rejecting his bid for a CRC referral." The Court of Appeal agreed that the trial court should have granted the suppression motion. The Court of Appeal reversed the judgment, and Mr. Ormonde was released from parole.

===== In re Maurice S. (1979) =====
Maurice S. and his defense appealed the judgement of the juvenile court, which had sentenced him to a thirty-six month period of commitment in the Youth Authority. Schnayerson, on behalf of Maurice S., argued that the appellant was entitled "to credit against his term of confinement for thirty-seven days spent in custody in addition to eighteen days 'good time credit,'" and that to specify consecutive terms of confinement was an error that the Court of Appeal must review and correct.

The Court of Appeal concluded that "no basis has been found for distinguishing between Youth Authority inmates and adult prisoners in regard to credit for time in confinement." The judgement was therefore modified by deleting the specification for consecutive terms of confinement, and modified as such was affirmed and remanded to the trial court "with directions to compute the appellant’s credit time in accordance with the defense’s arguments before the Court of Appeal."

== Recognition and certification ==
Board of California Attorneys for Criminal Justice 1975-1976

President of the California Attorneys for Criminal Justice 2002

Super Lawyers, San Francisco Magazine 2005-2008 and 2014–2020.

Lawyer of the Year by Best Lawyers 2014

Best Lawyers of America from 1987–present

Bay Area Best Lawyers, Oakland Magazine

Board Certified Specialist, Criminal Law, State Bar of California 1975–present

== Personal life ==
Schnayerson married Elizabeth Sher on December 17, 1967. They have two children and five grandchildren and currently reside in Oakland, California. He is an avid long-distance cyclist and has, amongst other endurance cycling events, completed the Markleeville Death Ride annually for the past three decades.
