= R. Graham Huntington =

American politician

R. Graham Huntington (May 17, 1897 – January 19, 1957) was an American Republican Party politician who served three terms in the New Jersey General Assembly representing Essex County.

Born in Newark, New Jersey, Huntington was a 1916 graduate of South Side High School (since renamed Malcolm X Shabazz High School) in Newark. He was a radioman in the United States Navy during World War I and later served as County Commander of the Essex County American Legion. He was a building contractor and resided in Maplewood, New Jersey. Huntington was elected to the New Jersey General Assembly in 1938 and was re-elected in 1939 and 1940. He served as Chairman of the Assembly Veterans and Military Affairs Committee in 1940. During World War II, Huntington served as Director of Civil Defense for Essex and Hudson counties.
