= Divine Bradley =

American activist

Divine Bradley (born October 9, 1982) is a social imagineer, business coach, youth mentor, motivational speaker, community leader, serial social entrepreneur who founded a youth-led non-profit organization at age 17 in New York City that led to the opening of several community centers with the purpose of providing students recreational activities as well as mentoring programs to promote financial responsibility and community leadership.

In recognition of the approach he used for mentoring, he is a subject in The Hip Hop Project, which was produced by Bruce Willis and Queen Latifah. He partnered with organizations, like Ralph Lauren and Doritos, to market their products while spreading messages for positive change. For his work, Bradley has received an award from the city of New York and was a recipient of the Dosomething.org's 2007 Golden BRICK Awards. His community service was also recognized in 2007 by Senator Hillary Clinton at the Seventh Annual African American Heritage Celebration. He was also made a Community hero by The My Hero Project. He is an alumnus of Art Start and Public Allies.

He was hired by The Future Project, and works as Dream Director at Malcolm X Shabazz High School in Newark, New Jersey, considered one of the "country's most troubled high schools". His efforts there are mentioned in the book Most Likely to Succeed: Preparing Our Kids for the Innovation Era by Ted Dintersmith and Tony Wagner who wrote, "students at Shabazz rise to challenges, take on ambitious projects, and approach education and life with newfound purpose." Bradley later took on a leadership role at the Future Project and was named Chief Dream Director for New Jersey.

== Early life ==
Bradley was born in 1982. His father was Alger Bradley, a footballer and sports commentator on 7 News Belize of Belmopan, Belize. He died in 2004 at 46. His mother, Debra Pratt-Miller, is an educator for the NYC Public School System. Before he was a year old, Bradley and his mother moved to the United States and settled in Crown Heights, Brooklyn, New York. They later moved to the Bedford-Stuyvesant area of Brooklyn. Throughout his teen years he attended Boys and Girls High School in his neighborhood, where he was mentored by his principal, Frank Mickens. He later attended Repertory Company High School for several months before leaving to obtain his GED in order to start his own non-profit.

== Career ==
=== Team Revolution ===
Increasingly young people, some still in their teens, are committing time, energy and ideas to social causes. They are at the heart of social entrepreneurship, a growing movement nurtured by dedicated individuals who want to address social needs worldwide by launching organisations, creating new businesses, partnering with hedge funds, and fostering local self-sufficiency.

— Elayne Clift, about Bradley and a few others

At the age of 17, Bradley resided in the Canarsie area of Brooklyn. He noticed there was a lack of safe places for the young people in his neighborhood to meet, so he opened a community center in the basement of the family home. The center focuses on community service initiatives and activities provided alternatives to risky behaviors, like promiscuous sex, prostitution, violence, gang activity, and drugs. Modeled after Art Start, a program for at-risk youth in New York City, it serves people from 13 to 23 years of age. He was inspired to make a positive impact following the murder of a close friend over a basketball game.

By 2002, the number of members outgrew the home and they needed a larger meeting place and raised over $25,000 in two weeks for his nonprofit, Team Revolution, by selling candy. The center offers opportunities for students to practice yoga and meditation, create music at "Hip Hopology" workshops, take trips to the spa, choreograph dances, visit museums, and attend concerts. They had a recording studio and a theatre in their new center. The young people are able to record their own music, and have access to recording industry professionals. Some have released and distributed their music.

Bradley developed programs within the organization such as The Bank, to teach teens about how to improve communities through economic and financial literacy. The Fellowship Academy, partners with corporations so that its members could learn about business. One of its partners is Polo Ralph Lauren. The L.E.A.D. program, which stands for Leadership Etiquette and Development, teaches young people how to be successful leaders. Of leading the organization, Bradley said, "My largest passion is making a living giving, working with young minds to assist in developing and nurturing their futures by creating new possibilities today."

By 2008, it served 500 participants and remains a student-led organization. By 2014, thousands of kids were impacted and the center became a model around the world. Dr. Doran Gresham, author of Why the SUN Rises: The Faces and Stories of Women in Education was one of the members of Team Revolution.

As the leader of an organization called Team Revolution, he works with these young people to turn them into leaders and entrepreneurs. He's working in a neighborhood and with a population—underprivileged youth—that federal, state, and local government have been discussing and claiming to help for years.

— David Burstein, author of Fast Future: How the Millennial Generation Is Shaping Our World

Bradley said in a New York Times profile, "You are taught to depend on the councilman, and you are taught to depend on the senator. You pay them with your tax dollars to do things for your community. But sometimes you have to create your own government... The best way to predict the future is to create it."

=== The Hip Hop Project ===
About the time that Bradley began Team Revolution, he mentored middle-school students through the Americorps Public Allies program, and helped 30 students through the "Hip Hop Project" approach so that they were able to succeed. Bradley states, "I feel that music is something that a lot of young people are into and it's a good method to communicate the work that we're doing ... Young people need that creative outlet." Bradley was a subject in the film, The Hip Hop Project in which Queen Latifah and Bruce Willis were the Executive Producers for the Pressure Point Films project. Chris Rolle, a musician and mentor who gained direction from New York City's Art Start program, was also a subject of the film. He founded in 1999, with Art Start's support, and according to Cassandra Lizaire, "has been encouraging impressionable young minds towards meaningful and positive musical messages ever since." It was filmed between 2001 and 2005, and was shown at the Brooklyn Museum of Art during "VH1 Hip Hop Honors Week" in 2006. The film debuted at the Tribeca Film Festival.

=== Campaigns ===
Bradley was designated as a Polo Ralph Lauren "Role Model" for its G.I.V.E Campaign. Bradley has promoted the brand with his image and quotes, like—"The best way to predict the future is to create it, for which he is known. The G.I.V.E. campaign messages have been promoted through commercials, apparel, in-store promotions, online, magazine covers, billboards, packaging and posters. He designed the Trademarked Graffiti G.I.V.E Tee, which were sold worldwide and all of the profits were donated to the purchaser's charity of choice. Bradley's Team Revolution and POLO Ralph Lauren created a Limited Edition Member's Jacket and other products and all of the earnings went to Team Revolution, for its upkeep and continued development. Bradley was also hired as a creative consultant by RODALE Publishing and the Ralph Lauren Cancer Center to arrange a team of youngsters who would create the content of the Better Health Book-a-Zine Project.

Bradley was a campaign spokesperson for Pepsi's "Refresh Everything" project and was hired by Pepsi as Training Consultant & Outreach Coordinator for a six city tour throughout Chicago, New York, Pittsburgh, San Francisco, Los Angeles and Miami. He has also partnered with Doritos. His image and story were printed on the back of the snack food bags.

=== The Future Project ===
Fortune Magazine reported in 2015 that Divine was hired by The Future Project, and worked as Dream Director at Malcolm X Shabazz High School in Newark, New Jersey. The Future Project partnered with the school's principal, Gemar Mills, to address what is identified as one of the "country's most troubled high schools". It was dubbed "Baghdad", was being considered for closure, and had four principals in as many years. Newark school's had been part of an unsuccessful $100 million effort to improve the schools.

Venture capitalist Ted Dintersmith and Tony Wagner wrote the book Most Likely to Succeed: Preparing Our Kids for the Innovation Era. In it, they look at how the Shabazz High School students are being prepared through innovative methods to be successful. Divine reaches out to students on an individual basis and asks, "What's something big and bold you'd like to do with your life to make your world better? I'm here to help you." Dintersmith and Wagner state that "Most students have never been asked about life goals before. As a result of this kind of engagement, students at Shabazz rise to challenges, take on ambitious projects, and approach education and life with newfound purpose." That kind of change required a paradigm shift. "We made a culture where young people felt like they didn't need permission to be great, to do great things."

He helped the girls' basketball team develop a plan to engage Shaquille O'Neal, born in Newark, to become engaged with the school and sponsor the trip for the team to a national tournament in California. This event was transformational for the school, and helped students see a correlation between their activities and possibilities for success. Now, school attendance has improved and students participate in programs during lunch, and outside of school hours, like classes that develop writing, communication, and collaboration skills.

=== Other ===
Bradley has been CEO of Divine Bradley LLC, BE IT LLC, The Network Carnival, and Speaker Concert. He is the founder of Project F.O.C.U.S.

He speaks to groups, like Ithaca College students, with whom he discussed "Be Empowered to Make a Difference!" in 2009.

== Awards and recognition ==
He was a 2002 recipient of the Mayor's Volunteer Service Award in New York City, presented by Mayor Michael Bloomberg, for his efforts in the founding of Project F.O.C.U.S. He was a recipient of Bank of America's Youth Entrepreneur of the year Award.

Bradley was honored for his role as a youth activist by Senator Hillary Clinton at the seventh Annual African American Heritage Celebration in April 2007. That year he was the recipient of the Golden Brick Award, in the Community Building category for his development of Team Revolution. In 2007, Bradley was the grand prize winner of the Do Something Award for establishing his youth-led organization. He was named a Community hero by The My Hero Project.
