= Tony Murphy (basketball) =

American basketball player

Personal information
- Born: April 15, 1957 (age 69) Paterson, New Jersey, U.S.
- Listed height: 6 ft 3 in (1.91 m)
- Listed weight: 180 lb (82 kg)

Career information
- High school: Eastside (Paterson, New Jersey)
- College: Southern (1976–1980)
- NBA draft: 1980: 3rd round, 62nd overall pick
- Drafted by: Kansas City Kings
- Playing career: 1980–present
- Position: Shooting guard

Career highlights
- NCAA scoring champion (1980)
- Stats at Basketball Reference

Tony Murphy (born April 15, 1957) is a retired American basketball player. He is best known for leading NCAA Division I in scoring in 1979–80 with a 32.1 points per game average. Murphy played college basketball at Southern University as a shooting guard. After his career at Southern was over, Murphy was selected in the 1980 NBA draft in the third round (62nd overall) by the Kansas City Kings, although he never made the team's final roster and, consequently, never played professional basketball.

Murphy grew up in Paterson, New Jersey and played basketball at Eastside High School, where he was named as the player of the year in his senior season by The Record / Herald News.

Eventually, Murphy worked for United Parcel Service (UPS) as a truck driver and also served as an assistant coach to the boys' basketball team at Eastside High School.

== See also ==
- List of NCAA Division I men's basketball season scoring leaders
