= School of Information Technology (New Jersey) =

Magnet high school in Passaic County, New Jersey, United States

Location
- 150 Park Avenue; Paterson, Passaic County, New Jersey 07501; United States
- Coordinates: 40.915098°N 74.160061°W

Information
- Type: Public high school
- School district: Paterson Public Schools
- NCES School ID: 341269003101
- Principal: Andre S. McCollum Sr.
- Faculty: 50.0 FTEs
- Grades: 9-12
- Enrollment: 657 (as of 2020–21)
- Student to teacher ratio: 13.1:1
- Website: soit-pps-nj.schoolloop.com

The School of Information Technology is a four-year public high school in Paterson in Passaic County, New Jersey, United States, operated as part of the Paterson Public Schools. It is one of a number of academy programs serving students in ninth through twelfth grades based at the Eastside High School campus.

As of the 2020–21 school year, the school had an enrollment of 657 students and 50.0 classroom teachers (on an FTE basis), for a student–teacher ratio of 13.1:1. There were 309 students (47.0% of enrollment) eligible for free lunch and none eligible for reduced-cost lunch.

== Awards, recognition and rankings ==
The school was the 336th-ranked public high school in New Jersey out of 339 schools statewide in New Jersey Monthly magazine's September 2014 cover story on the state's "Top Public High Schools", using a new ranking methodology, after being ranked 314th in the state in 2012.

== Administration ==
The school's principal is Andre S. McCollum Sr. His administrative team includes the assistant principal.
