= Dillingham Flaw =

The Dillingham Flaw is a phenomenon of faulty logic when nativists misinterpret and react negatively to the presence of immigrants in their midst. The term was coined by U.S. sociologist Vincent N. Parrillo to identify the centuries-old phenomenon.

Parrillo drew the name from a special commission created in 1907 by President Theodore Roosevelt to look into the “immigration problem.” Named after its chairman, U.S. Senator William P. Dillingham of Vermont, the Dillingham Commission over a 4-year period listened to testimony from civic leaders, educators, social scientists, and social workers and made on-site visits to Ellis Island and New York City’s Lower East Side. In 1911, the Commission issued a 41-volume report of its findings. Unfortunately, the report was flawed in its interpretation of the data that the Commission had so tirelessly collected. The Commission erred in its use of simplistic categories for diverse immigrant groups and in making an unfair comparison of “old” and “new” immigrants, despite the changed structural conditions and longer time interval that previous immigrants had to assimilate and to achieve some measure of economic security.

The Dillingham Flaw refers to inaccurate comparisons of immigrant groups based on simplistic categorizations and anachronistic observations. Parrillo argued that this erroneous thinking can occur in assessments of the past, present, or future.

== The past ==
Applying modern classifications or sensibilities to a time when they did not exist, or, if they did, had a different form or meaning, is one version of the Dillingham Flaw. For example, today's term British refers collectively to the people of the United Kingdom (the English, Welsh, Scots, and Scots-Irish). However, in the 18th century, British had the much narrower meaning for only the English, and for good reason. The English, Welsh, Scots, and Scots-Irish may have all been English-speaking, but significant cultural and religious differences existed among them and they did not view each other as “similar.” Anyone who presumes that the colonial British, even just the colonial English, were a single cohesive entity, and thus the 13 English colonies were homogeneous, would fall victim to the Dillingham Flaw.

A similar trap is speaking about either African slaves or Native Americans as single, monolithic entities generations ago. Such ethnocentric generalizations fail to acknowledge that these groups actually consisted of diverse peoples with distinctive languages, cultures, and behavior patterns. Similarly, European immigrants were not alike, despite their collective groupings by mainstream society. Instead, all of these groups—African American, Native American, and immigrant—were diverse peoples with many distinctions that set them apart from one another.

== The present ==
Similar misconceptions can, and often do, occur in one's own time. Working from a false premise about past rapid assimilation and cultural homogeneity, some individuals employ what they believe is an objective comparison with the present scene, which they find troubling in its heterogeneity and supposedly non-assimilating groups. Like the 1907 Dillingham Commission, they may be susceptible to mistaken impressions about a “threat” posed by recent immigrants whose presence and behavior they view as different from earlier immigrants.

The most common examples are expressed views that today's immigrant minorities present an unprecedented challenge to an integrative society. Reacting to the increasing presence—even in many nonurban settings—of nonwhite newcomers speaking a foreign tongue, including many from a non-Judeo-Christian background, nativists view with alarm these demographic changes. Such fears are echoes of those raised about earlier groups, such as the racist responses to the physical appearance of Southern Europeans or the anti-Semitic reactions to eastern European Jews. In reality, studies consistently reveal rapid English language acquisition among all immigrants groups and higher naturalization rates among non-Westerners.

== The future ==
Using oversimplified categorizations and imposing present-day sensibilities—the essence of the Dillingham Flaw—also can occur when individuals engage in demographic projections. For example, the U.S. Census Bureau projects that Hispanics will comprise about 30 percent of the total U.S. population in 2050. Given past patterns and current trends, however, we cannot be certain that today's group categories, such as Hispanic, will still be valid by then.

Currently, most white Americans bear witness to mixed European ancestry, but two generations ago, Americans of southern, central, and eastern European backgrounds were far more likely to be of a single national lineage and religion. Their single-group identities evolved into multiple-group identities, as large-scale intermarriages generated such a blending of peoples that “whites” and “European Americans” became synonymous. Further, their mixed heritage is now more likely to be passively acknowledged, except for occasional symbolic celebrations. It is no longer an element of everyday ethnicity, subcultural participation, or minority status.

Each succeeding year shows greater numbers of exogamous marriages among ethnic, racial, and religious groups. Therefore, it is not unreasonable, for example, to suggest—given the annual increase in Hispanics marrying non-Hispanics—that in two generations many of the descendants of today's Hispanic Americans will claim a mixed heritage, partly Hispanic and partly non-Hispanic. Projections that the mid-21st century will find the United States with a Hispanic population totaling 30 percent suggests a demographic categorization by today's realities that may well not fit the reality then.

A similar argument could be made for other groups, as racial intermarriages continue to create a growing multiracial population. Using today's categories for Americans living in 2050 can easily be another unwitting application of the Dillingham Flaw. Projecting our perceptions and the existing social distance between groups onto a distant future carries a presumption that they will remain the same. However, our present-day categories may be inadequate or irrelevant to our descendants.
