= Lewis Yablonsky =

American sociologist and academic (1924–2014)

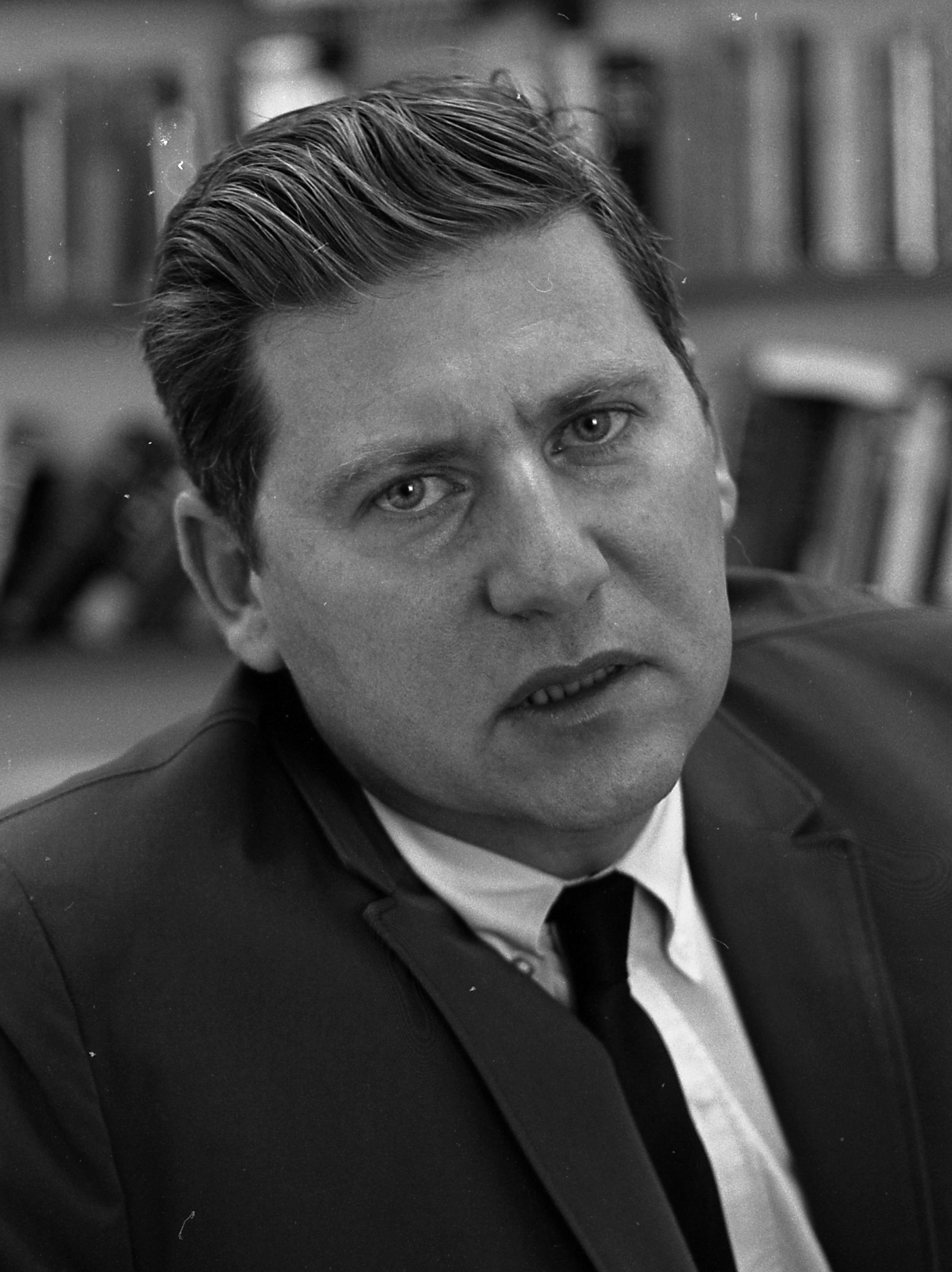
- Yablonsky in 1965
- Born: November 23, 1924; Irvington, New Jersey, U.S.
- Died: January 29, 2014 (aged 89); Santa Monica, California
- Occupations: Sociologist and academic
- Awards: American Sociological Association Distinguished Career Award for the Practice of Sociology

Academic background
- Education: Rutgers University; New York University

Academic work
- Discipline: Sociology, criminology
- Institutions: California State University, Northridge; University of Massachusetts

Lewis Yablonsky (November 23, 1924 – January 29, 2014) was an American sociologist, criminologist, author, and psychotherapist best known for his innovative and experiential work with gang members as well as with the counterculture of the 1960s. He wrote seventeen books and taught for over thirty years at California State University, Northridge.

== Early life and education ==
Lewis Edward Yablonsky was born on November 23, 1924, in Irvington, New Jersey, the son of a laundry delivery truck driver. His father, Harry Yablonsky, was a Russian Jewish immigrant and his mother, Fannie, was from Romania. He was the second of three sons, and grew up poor in Newark, New Jersey. As a child he was subject to anti-Semitic abuse, and described challenges related to being one of few white children in an African-American neighborhood. He attended South Side High School in Newark where he claimed to be friends with a variety of criminals and sociopaths. While he engaged in street gambling and other forms of juvenile delinquency in high school, he was also a standout athlete and received a baseball scholarship to the University of Alabama. After one year he left school to serve in the U.S. Navy during World War II, and received an honorable discharge in 1946. He went back to college on the G.I. Bill and earned a business degree from Rutgers University in 1948. Later he attended New York University where he received a master's degree in sociology in 1952 and a doctorate in criminology in 1957.

== Career ==
While still in graduate school, Yablonsky began to work with gang members in the Morningside Heights section of New York City, instilling in him a lifelong fascination which became part of his research agenda. After receiving his Ph.D. he taught for three years at the University of Massachusetts, and then took a position at UCLA where he researched Synanon and became attracted to its tenets. He had learned about psychodrama from Jacob Moreno at New York University, and he passed on his knowledge of this psychotherapeutic approach to Synanon members.

Yablonsky started teaching at San Fernando Valley State College (now California State University, Northridge) in 1963 and stayed for over 30 years. He received several teaching and research awards including a lifetime achievement award from the American Sociological Association.

He wrote 17 books on a variety of topics including gang life, drug addiction, the counter culture, the father-son relationship, and psychotherapy. Yablonsky often became close to the subjects of his research, and this was especially true with his work on the counter-culture, when he began to smoke marijuana and experimented with LSD, despite his aversion to drugs. His work with hippies and gang members led him to testify in many court cases, most notably the trial of hippie leader Gridley Wright where Yablonsky pled the Fifth Amendment when asked about his drug use. His belief that most gang members were not sociopaths led him to testify in their defense, and his testimony saved the life of at least one accused gang member and freed others from prison. On rare occasions he also testified for the prosecution, including at the trial of Damian Williams who was infamous for his brutal attack on Reginald Denny.

== Personal life ==
Yablonsky was married for 17 years to Donna King, a former drug addict. They met at Synanon while Yablonsky was conducting a psychodrama class. The marriage ended in divorce. They had one son together, Mitch.

== Impact ==
Yablonsky gained a national profile for his work with gang members, drug addicts, and hippies as well as through his many books and articles His work is credited with helping to move sociology from a sterile, statistics-oriented discipline to a hands-on, more experiential movement. The New York Times wrote that early in his career he had become “a prominent and provocative public intellectual in the 1960s, combining academic analysis, experiential research and sometimes direct, unconventional efforts to solve social problems.”

== Death ==
Yablonsky died in Santa Monica, California on January 29, 2014.

== Publications ==
- The Violent Gang. New York: Macmillan, 1962.
- The Tunnel Back: Synanon. New York: Macmillan, 1965.
- The Hippie Trip. New York, Pegasus, 1968.
- Robopaths. Indianapolis: Bobbs-Merrill, 1972.
- The Extra-sex Factor: Why over Half of America's Married men Play Around. New York: Times Books, 1979.
- The Little League Game: How Kids, Coaches, and Parents Really Play It. New York: Times Books, 1979.
- Psychodrama: Resolving Emotional Problems through Role-playing. New York: Gardner Press, 1981.
- The Therapeutic Community: A Successful Approach for Treating Substance Abusers. New York: Gardner Press, 1989.
- Fathers and Sons: The Most Challenging of All Family Relationships. New York: Gardner Press, 1990.
- The Emotional Meaning of Money. New York: Gardner Press, 1991.
- Gangsters: Fifty Years of Madness, Drugs and Death on the Streets of America. New York: New York University Press, 1997.
- George Raft. iUniverse, 2000.
- Gangs in Court. Tucson: Lawyers & Judges Pub. Co., 2005.
- Confessions of a Criminologist: Some of My Best Friends Were Sociopaths. iUniverse, 2010.
