= Paterson P-TECH High School =

Magnet high school in Passaic County, New Jersey, US

Location
- 201 Memorial Drive; Paterson, Passaic County, New Jersey 07505; United States
- Coordinates: 40.89374°N 74.15341°W

Information
- Type: Public high school
- School district: Paterson Public Schools
- NCES School ID: 341269003109
- Principal: Charla Holder
- Faculty: 14.0 FTEs
- Grades: 9-12
- Enrollment: 200 (as of 2023–24)
- Student to teacher ratio: 14.3:1
- Website: ptech.paterson.k12.nj.us

Paterson P-TECH High School is a four-year public high school in Paterson in Passaic County, in the U.S. state of New Jersey, operated as part of the Paterson Public Schools. It is one of a number of academy programs serving students in ninth through twelfth grades offered by the school district. The program focuses on earth science and space science as part of a partnership with Passaic County Community College and grants from NASA.

As of the 2023–24 school year, the school had an enrollment of 200 students and 14.0 classroom teachers (on an FTE basis), for a student–teacher ratio of 14.3:1. There were 80 students (40.0% of enrollment) eligible for free lunch and none eligible for reduced-cost lunch.

== Awards, recognition and rankings ==
The school was the 303rd-ranked public high school in New Jersey out of 339 schools statewide in New Jersey Monthly magazine's September 2014 cover story on the state's "Top Public High Schools", using a new ranking methodology.

The students at was then called Panther Academy won second place at the 2015 state mathematics competition organized by the Association of Mathematics Teachers of New Jersey.
