= Henry Janowitz =

American physician and academic (1915–2008)

- Born: March 13, 1915; Paterson, New Jersey
- Died: August 21, 2008 (aged 93)
- Education: Columbia University College of Physicians and Surgeons
- Spouse: Adeline R. Tintner
- Children: 2 (Anne and Mary Janowitz)
- Scientific career
- Workplaces: Icahn School of Medicine at Mount Sinai

Henry David Janowitz (March 13, 1915 – August 21, 2008) was professor emeritus of gastroenterology at the Icahn School of Medicine at Mount Sinai. He is known for his contributions into inflammatory bowel diseases and being a leader in the Crohn's disease and ulcerative colitis research.

== Early life and education ==
Janowitz was born in a Jewish household to Rose and Sam Janowitz on March 13, 1915, in Paterson, New Jersey. The sociologist Morris Janowitz was his younger brother. After graduating from Eastside High School at the age of 16, Janowitz entered Columbia College from which he graduated with honors and a membership into Phi Beta Kappa. His major there was biology but his undergraduate was history of philosophy.

Because he was uncertain whether to pursue medicine or philosophy, he sought an advice from his mentor and professor, Dr. Irwin Edman. Edman suggested to him to become a physician, and so he did. After graduating from Columbia University College of Physicians and Surgeons in 1939 with Alpha Omega Alpha honor, Janowitz did a two-year fellowship in clinical pathology.

== War ==
In 1942 he joined the US Army as a medic in World War II and until 1946 served as such at its Medical Corps. While serving at an Arkansas-based Army hospital, Janowitz became acquainted with Thomas Urmy, a gastroenterologist from Boston. After learning preceptorship in gastroenterology from this man, the next three years became very fruitful for Janowitz, who during those years served as gastroenterologist in France and Germany, and was eventually sent home with a rank of a major.

== Career ==
=== Early career ===
Following the war, he resumed his studying, earning a master's degree in physiology from Columbia University College of Physicians and Surgeons. In 1947, at the age of 32, Janowitz became a CUCPS resident. Between 1948 and 1950 he worked towards master's degree in physiology at Andrew Conway Ivy's Department of Clinical Science at the University of Illinois. There, under mentorship of professor Morton I. Grossman, he laid out foundations in gastrointestinal physiology and became known as Dr. Grossman's oldest living student.

Since gastrin and cholecystokinin were already discovered by that time, Dr. Janowitz focused his study onto physiology of gastric organs and autonomic nervous system. Upon completion of his thesis in 1950, Janowitz returned to the Gastrointestinal Physiology Laboratory as full time researcher. While at the lab, he worked under Franklin Hollander, who at that time was a renowned gastroenterologist after publishing his investigations into gastrointestinal electrolyte metabolism.

=== Later career ===
Janowitz became a private practitioner in 1952 and worked closely with Burrill Bernard Crohn at Mount Sinai Hospital in Manhattan, New York. While there, he also worked with David Dreiling and contributed to the study of peptic ulcer and inflammatory bowel diseases. In 1958, Janowitz was asked to create a Division of Gastroenterology at the Mount Sinai Hospital. While leading that group, he trained over 100 residents and fellows among which were Bernard Wolf and Richard Marshak.

== Editorial work ==
Prof. Janowitz served on many editorial boards, including Journal of Chronic Diseases (now known as Journal of Clinical Epidemiology), the American Journal of Physiology and was a contributor to Gastroenterology Clinics. He also was known for the resurrection of the American Journal of Digestive Diseases which existed from 1956 to 1966.

He was a member of the Association of American Physicians and Surgeons and served as Committee chairman with the American Gastroenterological Association and on the National Scientific Advisory Board of the National Foundation for Ileitis and Colitis.

== Death and legacy ==
Janowitz died on August 19, 2008 and was survived by two children Anne and Mary Janowitz.

== Honors ==
- Member of the American Society for Clinical Investigation (1956)
