= Gemar Mills =

American author and speaker

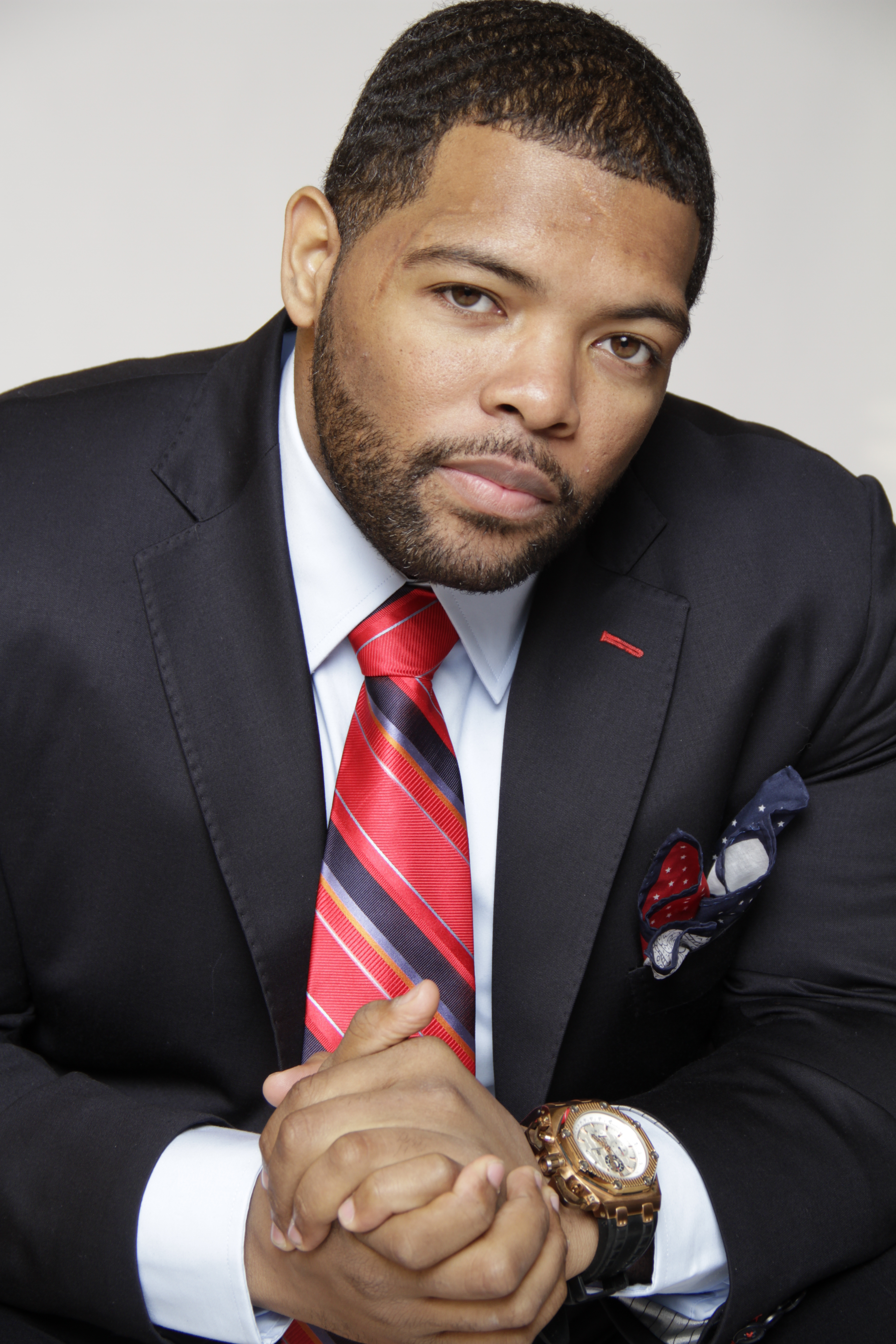
- Born: Paterson, New Jersey, U.S.
- Education: Montclair State University (B.S.); American Intercontinental University (M.A.); Seton Hall University (Ph.D.)
- Occupations: Principal, Motivational Speaker, Writer
- Known for: School Turnaround
- Website: www.gemarmills.com

Gemar Mills is an American author and speaker. He was the youngest ever principal of Malcolm X Shabazz High School when he took the job at the age of 27.

== Education ==
Mills was born and raised in Paterson, New Jersey, United States, where he graduated from John F. Kennedy High School. In 2004, he got his Bachelor of Science in Mathematics degree from Montclair State University, Montclair, New Jersey. In 2008, he received Master of Arts in Educational Leadership degree from American InterContinental University in Atlanta, and PhD in Education in Primary and Secondary Education in May 2017 from Seton Hall University.

== The Future Project ==
Fortune Magazine reported in 2015 that Divine Bradley had been hired by The Future Project to work as "Dream Director" at Malcolm X Shabazz High School. The Future Project partnered with Mills, who was then the school's principal, to address what was identified as one of the "country's most troubled high schools". The school was nicknamed "Baghdad", was being considered for closure, and had four principals in as many years. Newark schools had been part of an unsuccessful $100 million effort to improve the schools. The Future Project is an American non-profit organization aims to help underserved high school students.
