= Vincent N. Parrillo =

Vincent N. Parrillo is professor emeritus of sociology at William Paterson University. He has been a visiting professor at Romanian-American University (2018), the University of Liège, Belgium (2010), the University of Pisa, Italy (2006 and 1998), and Roehampton University, London (2005). As a Fulbright scholar in the Czech Republic in 2000, he lectured at Charles University (Prague) and Palacký University (Olomouc).

Raised in Paterson, New Jersey, Parrillo attended a richly diverse Paterson Central High School (since renamed as John F. Kennedy High School).

He is the executive producer and writer of six award-winning PBS television documentaries: "Paterson: A Delicious Destination" (2020);"Silk City Artists and Musicians" (2017), "Paterson and Its People" (2015),Gaetano Federici: The Sculptor Laureate of Paterson (2013), Smokestacks and Steeples: A Portrait of Paterson (1992), and Ellis Island: Gateway to America (1991). He is the author of ten books, editor of three others, and General Editor of the two-volume, multidisciplinary Encyclopedia of Social Problems (Sage, 2008). His scholarly articles and essays have appeared in such journals as Sociological Forum, Social Science Journal, Journal of Comparative Family Studies, and Small Group Behavior, and his various writings have been published in one of eleven languages (Chinese, Czech, Dutch, German, Italian, Japanese, Korean, Polish, Romanian, Turkish, and Vietnamese). He served as Vice President of the Eastern Sociological Society in 2008–2009, and was honored as its Robin M. Williams Jr. Distinguished Lecturer for 2005–2006.

Parrillo coined the term Dillingham Flaw, which refers to inaccurate comparisons of immigrants—whether in the past, present, or future—that are based on simplistic categorizations and anachronistic observations. He is also the principal investigator and senior author of two of the largest national studies ever conducted on social distance.

Parrillo has gone on numerous assignments for the State Department's former U.S. Information Agency (USIA) and current Bureau of International Information Programs (IIP) to give public lectures and to confer with national leaders in Canada, the Czech Republic, Germany, Norway, Poland, Romania, and Sweden on issues relating to immigration and intergroup tensions. He has conducted numerous diversity training sessions for various corporations and for NCOs and senior army officers at the Defense Equal Opportunity Management Institute (DEOMI) at Patrick Air Force Base (Florida) and at various military bases.

An invited lecturer to dozens of universities in Asia, Canada, Europe, and the United States in recent years, he has also been the keynote speaker at international conferences in Belgium, the Czech Republic, Germany, Italy, Korea, Poland, and Romania. In October 2001, his keynote speech, "The Challenge for Educators", given at a U.S. bilingual educators conference, was published in Vital Speeches of the Day.

Since the 2022 publication of Hearts and Minds: Hizmet Schools and Interethnic Relations, he has embarked on more than a dozen book tours to cities throughout the United States, as well as in Belgium and the Netherlands.

In 2011, he published a novel about Ellis Island in the 1890s and the people who work there, called Guardians of the Gate. Its sequel, Defenders of Freedom came out in 2015.

In 2003, he directed a cast of Broadway professionals (including several Tony Award nominees) in a staged reading of the rock opera Hamlet (he is co-lyricist) at the Lamb's Theatre in New York City. In 2005 he co-produced its world premiere in Prague. In October 2007, the show premiered in Seoul to rave reviews and enthusiastic audience responses. came out in 2015.
