= Hazel Clark =

American middle-distance runner (born 1977)

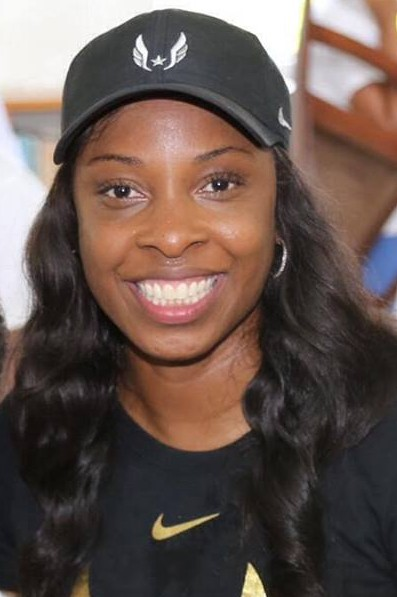
- Clark in Fiji in April 2014

Personal information
- Full name: Hazel Mae Clark
- Nickname: "Peachy"
- Nationality: United States
- Born: October 3, 1977 (age 49) Livingston, New Jersey, U.S.
- Height: 5 ft 10 in (1.78 m)
- Weight: 121 lb (55 kg)
- Website: clarkfamontop.com

Sport
- Sport: Track and field
- Event: 800 meters
- College team: University of Florida
- Turned pro: 1999

Achievements and titles
- National finals: Six national titles
- Highest world ranking: 6th in the world

Hazel Mae Clark (born October 3, 1977) is an American retired middle-distance runner who specialized in the 800 meters middle distance race. She was a member of the U.S. Olympic team in 2000, 2004 and 2008. She has won six national titles and two USA Olympic Trials events during her career.

== Early life and education ==
Clark was born in Livingston, New Jersey. She is the daughter of inner-city educator Joe Louis Clark, who inspired the film Lean on Me, and the sister-in-law of fellow Olympian Jearl Miles-Clark. Joetta Clark Diggs is her older sister. Hazel Clark, her sister, and her sister-in-law made history when they swept the 2000 Olympic trials 800 meters.

Clark attended Columbia High School. She accepted an athletic scholarship to attend the University of Florida in Gainesville, Florida, where she was a member of the Florida Gators track and field team and was coached by her brother J.J. While at Florida, she was undefeated in SEC competition and won five NCAA titles. Clark graduated from the University of Florida with a bachelor's degree in sociology in 2001. She was honored for her college athletic record when she was inducted into the University of Florida Athletic Hall of Fame as a "Gator Great" in 2012.

== Career ==
Clark finished seventh at the 2000 Olympic Games. At the 2001 World Championships, she did not progress past the first round due to injury. In 2001, she was given a warning for using pseudoephedrine.

Shortly before the 2004 Olympics in Athens, Clark suffered severe burns on her back caused by an accident which limited her training. She did not proceed from her first-round heat in the 800 meters. She then had two good seasons with an eighth place at the 2005 World Championships, seventh place at the 2005 and 2006 World Athletics Final, and a sixth place at the 2006 World Cup.

In 2008, she won her second U.S. Olympic Trials 800 meters final held in Eugene, Oregon, and competed at the 2008 Summer Olympics. Her personal best time is 1:57.99 minutes, achieved in July 2005 at the Bislett Games in Oslo.

Clark has appeared in three global Nike ads appearing in fashion magazines, stores, and billboards. She has been marketed by Nike as a spokesmodel throughout her career.

From 2018 to 2025, Clark held a series of leadership roles at the Bermuda Tourism Authority.

== See also ==
- Florida Gators
- List of University of Florida alumni
- List of University of Florida Athletic Hall of Fame members
- List of University of Florida Olympians
