= William Wadsworth Evans =

American politician (1887-1972)

New Jersey State Assemblyman
- In office January 1919 – January 1925
- Preceded by: Aldin Smith
- Succeeded by: Albert Comstock

Personal details
- Born: William Wadsworth Evans; October 5, 1887 Paterson, New Jersey, U.S.
- Died: November 13, 1972 (aged 85) Wayne, New Jersey, U.S.
- Party: Republican
- Spouse: Isabel Urquhart Blauvelt
- Parent(s): John William Evans; Emily Wadsworth Evans
- Education: New York Law School
- Profession: Lawyer

William Wadsworth Evans Sr. (October 5, 1887 – November 13, 1972) was an American Republican Party politician who served in the New Jersey General Assembly from 1919 to 1924, serving as Speaker of the New Jersey General Assembly in his final term in office.

== Early life ==
Evans was born in Paterson, New Jersey on October 5, 1887, the son of John William Evans and Emily Wadsworth Evans. He was a 1905 graduate of Paterson Central High School (since renamed as John F. Kennedy High School) and graduated from New York Law School in 1908. He played the organ at St. Mark's Church in-the-Bowery in order to cover his law school tuition. He was admitted to the New Jersey Bar in 1911. In 1912, Evans served as Secretary to New Jersey Assembly Speaker Thomas F. McCran.

== State Assemblyman ==
He was elected Assemblyman in 1918, and was re-elected in 1919, 1920, 1921, 1922 and 1923. Evans served as Assembly Speaker in 1922.

== Family and later life ==
Evans was married to Isabel Urquhart Blauvelt (1892–1967), the daughter of William B. Blauvelt, a Paterson banker. He had two children: Barbara Evans Boe (1914–1999) and William W. Evans Jr. (1921–1999), a former New Jersey State Assemblyman and a candidate for the Republican nomination for President in 1968. A resident of Glen Rock, New Jersey, he died at age 86 in Wayne, New Jersey, on November 13, 1972.
