= Paterson STEAM High School =

High school in Passaic County, New Jersey, US

Location
- 764 11th Avenue; Paterson, Passaic County, New Jersey 07514; United States; 40.9194294°N 74.1328952°W

Information
- Type: Public high school
- School district: Paterson Public Schools
- NCES School ID: 341269003107
- Principal: Nellista Bess
- Faculty: 32.0 FTEs
- Grades: 9-12
- Enrollment: 379 (as of 2024–25)
- Student to teacher ratio: 11.8:1
- Website: steamhs.paterson.k12.nj.us

Paterson STEAM High School is a four-year public high school in Paterson in Passaic County, in the U.S. state of New Jersey, operated as part of the Paterson Public Schools. It is one of the academy programs serving students in ninth through twelfth grades offered by the school district.

As of the 2024–25 school year, the school had an enrollment of 379 students and 32.0 classroom teachers (on an FTE basis), for a student–teacher ratio of 11.8:1. There were 240 students (63.3% of enrollment) eligible for free lunch and 5 (1.3% of students) eligible for reduced-cost lunch.

== History ==
Starting in the 2021–22 school year, HARP Academy moved to the former Paterson Catholic High School facility, relocating from a downtown building it had occupied since 2016.

== Awards, recognition and rankings ==
The school was the 219th-ranked public high school in New Jersey out of 339 schools statewide in New Jersey Monthly magazine's September 2014 cover story on the state's "Top Public High Schools", using a new ranking methodology.

In February 2016, HARP Academy was named one of New Jersey's Rewards School for High Performance, the only school in the county to be recognized for the award. The school received a one time grant in the amount of $50,000 to be used to enhance the school's existing Title I program.

== Administration ==
The school's principal is Nellista Bess. The core administration team includes the vice principal.
