= Rosa L. Parks School of Fine and Performing Arts =

High school in Passaic County, New Jersey, US

Location
- 413 12th Avenue; Paterson, Passaic County, New Jersey 07514; United States
- 40.919814°N 74.146437°W

Information
- Type: Public high school
- Established: 1986
- School district: Paterson Public Schools
- NCES School ID: 341269005998
- Principal: Nicolette A. Thompson
- Faculty: 27.0 FTEs
- Grades: 9-12
- Enrollment: 257 (as of 2023–24)
- Student to teacher ratio: 9.5:1
- Website: rlphs.paterson.k12.nj.us

The Rosa L. Parks School of Fine and Performing Arts is a four-year public high school in Paterson in Passaic County, in the U.S. state of New Jersey, serving students in ninth through twelfth grades as part of the Paterson Public Schools. In October 1986, Rosa Parks honored the school family at the opening ceremony by cutting the ribbon. To date, it is the only high school in the United States named after her.

The school provides training in each of eight art majors: Commercial Art, Fine Art, Dance, Drama, Vocal, Instrumental, Piano, and Communication Arts (formerly known as Creative Writing). Communication Arts, however, is not recognized as a major because it is not considered a fine art anymore. Paterson residents in eighth grade can apply for admission to Rosa Parks School, with acceptance based on a competitive audition process, which may include a submission of an art or writing portfolio.

As of the 2023–24 school year, the school had an enrollment of 257 students and 27.0 classroom teachers (on an FTE basis), for a student–teacher ratio of 9.5:1. There were 151 students (58.8% of enrollment) eligible for free lunch and 10 (3.9% of students) eligible for reduced-cost lunch.

== Awards, recognition and rankings ==
The school was the 226th-ranked public high school in New Jersey out of 339 schools statewide in New Jersey Monthly magazine's September 2014 cover story on the state's "Top Public High Schools", using a new ranking methodology. The school had been ranked 254th in the state of 328 schools in 2012, after being ranked 123rd in 2010 out of 322 schools listed. The magazine ranked the school 137th in 2008 out of 316 schools. The school was ranked 127th in the magazine's September 2006 issue, which surveyed 316 schools across the state.

Schooldigger.com ranked the school 284th out of 367 public high schools statewide in its 2010 rankings (a decrease of 106 positions from the 2009 rank) which were based on the combined percentage of students classified as proficient or above proficient on the language arts literacy and mathematics components of the High School Proficiency Assessment (HSPA).

== Administration ==
The school's principal is Nicolette A. Thompson. Her administration team includes the vice principal.

== Notable alumni ==
- Essence Carson (born 1986), basketball player for the New York Liberty.
- T. J. Hill (born 1980), plays for the Edmonton Eskimos.
