= School of Information Technology, Shinawatra University =

- Type: Education and Research
- Established: 2002
- Director: Dr.Photchanan Ratanajaipan
- Location: Pathum Thani, Thailand

The School of Information Technology (SoIT) is the Information Technology Department of Shinawatra University (SIU) located at Pathum Thani province, Thailand. The school aims to provide strong foundations in computer sciences, computer engineerings, and information technologies which are then used to derive practical solutions in the 'real-world' IT problems.

== Courses offered ==
- Bachelor of Science Program in Computer Science
- Bachelor of Engineering Program in Computer Engineering
- Master of Science Program in Information Technology (International Program)
- Doctor of Philosophy Program in Information Technology (International Program)

== Computer laboratories ==
- Macintosh Laboratory
- Network and Operating System Laboratory
- Computer Architecture Laboratory
- Programming and Graphics Design Laboratory
