= Malcolm X Shabazz High School =

High school in Newark, New Jersey, United States

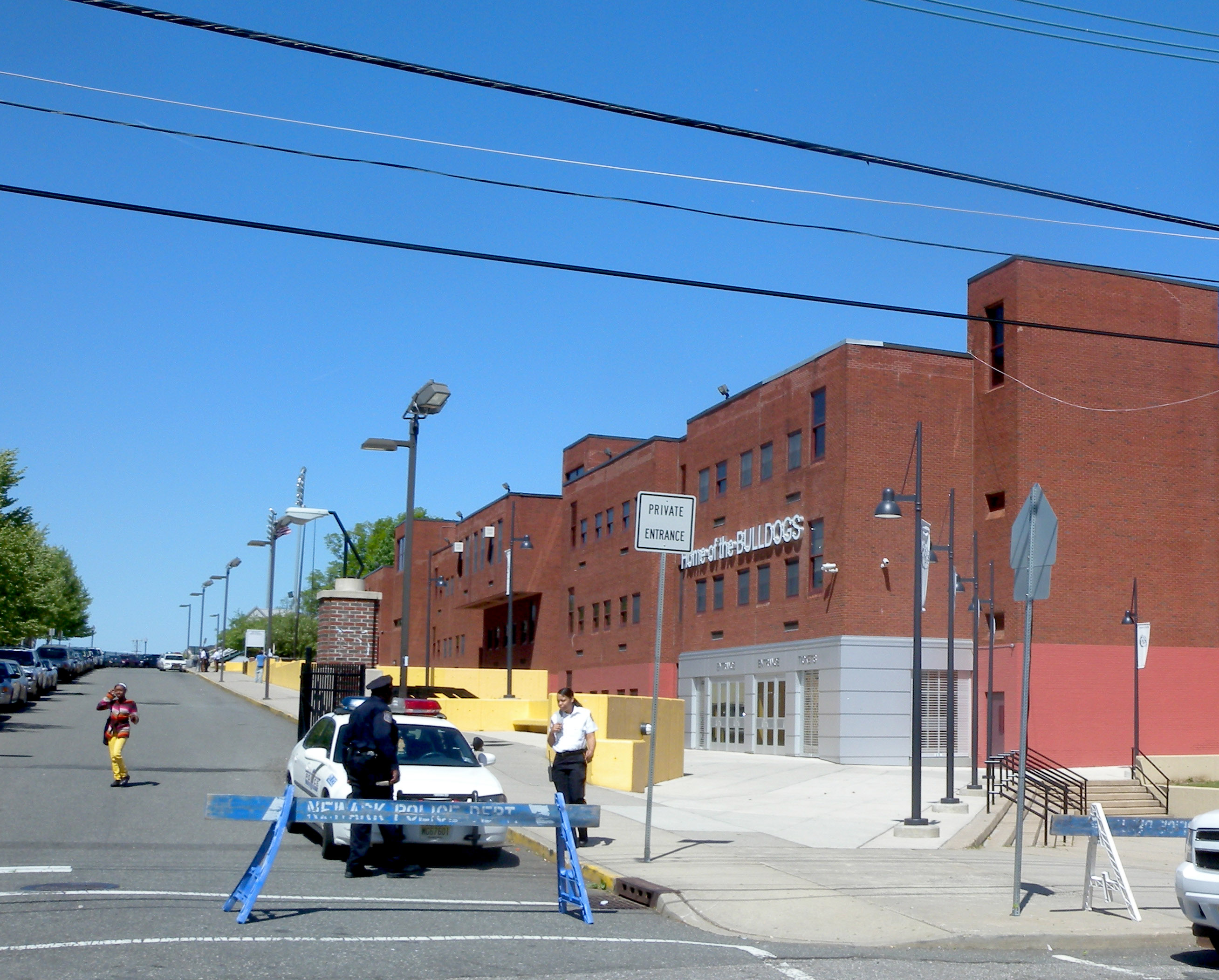

Location
- 80 Johnson Avenue; Newark, Essex County, New Jersey 07108; United States; 40.718974°N 74.191804°W

Information
- Type: public high school
- Motto: Home of the Bulldogs
- Established: 1912; 114 years ago
- School district: Newark Public Schools
- NCES School ID: 341134002198
- Principal: Atiba Buckman
- Faculty: 25.0 FTEs
- Grades: 9–12
- Enrollment: 531 (as of 2024–25)
- Student to teacher ratio: 21.2:1
- Colors: Black and gold
- Athletics conference: Super Essex Conference (general); North Jersey Super Football Conference (football)
- Team name: Bulldogs
- Rival: Weequahic High School
- Website: www.nps.k12.nj.us/MXS/

Malcolm X Shabazz High School is a four-year comprehensive public high school in Newark in Essex County, in the U.S. state of New Jersey, as part of the Newark Public Schools. Founded as South Side High School in 1912, the school was renamed in 1972 in memory of Malcolm X. The school is accredited by the Middle States Association of Colleges and Schools Commission on Elementary and Secondary Schools until July 2031.

As of the 2024–25 school year, the school had an enrollment of 531 students and 25.0 classroom teachers (on an FTE basis), for a student–teacher ratio of 21.2:1. There were 348 students (65.5% of enrollment) eligible for free lunch and 26 (4.9% of students) eligible for reduced-cost lunch.

== Rankings ==
The school was the 310th-ranked public high school in New Jersey out of 339 schools statewide in New Jersey Monthly magazine's September 2014 cover story on the state's "Top Public High Schools", using a new ranking methodology. The school had been ranked 291st in the state of 328 schools in 2012, after being ranked 314th in 2010 out of 322 schools listed. The magazine ranked the school 296th in 2008 out of 316 schools. The school was ranked 312th in the magazine's September 2006 issue, which surveyed 316 schools across the state. Malcolm X Shabazz has scored 20.4 and 46.1 in the High School Proficiency Assessment (HSPA) test results in the subjects of math and language arts respectively.

== Athletics ==
The Malcolm X Shabazz High School Bulldogs compete in the Super Essex Conference, which is comprised of public and private high schools in Essex County and was established following a reorganization of sports leagues in Northern New Jersey by the New Jersey State Interscholastic Athletic Association (NJSIAA). Before the 2009 restructuring, the school had previously participated in the Watchung Conference, which included high schools in Essex, Hudson and Union counties in northern New Jersey. With 334 students in grades 10–12, the school was classified by the NJSIAA for the 2019–20 school year as Group I for most athletic competition purposes, which included schools with an enrollment of 75 to 476 students in that grade range. The football team competes in the National Red division of the North Jersey Super Football Conference, which includes 112 schools competing in 20 divisions, making it the nation's biggest football-only high school sports league. The school was classified by the NJSIAA as Group II North for football for 2024–2026, which included schools with 484 to 683 students. Varsity sports include basketball, volleyball, track and field, football, soccer, wrestling, golf, baseball and softball.

The boys' basketball team won the Group III state championship in 1979 (vs. Long Branch High School), 1995 (vs. Rancocas Valley Regional High School), 1997 (vs. Steinert High School), 2001 (vs. Camden High School) and 2005 (vs. Camden), and the 2010 Group II title (vs. Pequannock Township High School); as South Side High School, the boys' basketball team won the Group III title in 1962 (vs. Neptune High School), 1965 (vs. South Plainfield High School), 1969 (vs. Lincoln High School) and 1971 (vs. Ocean Township High School). Lonnie Wright led the 1962 team to the Group III title with a 72–52 win against a Neptune team that came into the championship game with a 25–0 record. In 1995, the team won the Group III state title on a basket scored with just over three seconds left in the game to defeat Rancocas Valley by a score of 60–59 in the championship game. The team won the 2001 North II, Group III state sectional title with a 56–45 win against Cranford High School. The team won the 2005 Group III state championship, defeating Ramapo High School, 64–59, in the semifinals and Camden High School, 76–58, in the championship game. The team won the 2006 North II Group III state championships. In the Group III state tournament, the team knocked off North I Group III champion Northern Valley Regional High School at Old Tappan, 77–68, in the semifinals, before falling to Hamilton High School 66–34 in the Group III championship game at Rutgers University.

The girls' basketball team won the Group III state championship in 1983 (vs. Sterling High School), 2003 and 2004 (vs. Willingboro High School both years), 2006 (vs. Monmouth Regional High School), 2008 (vs. Ocean City High School), 2009 (vs. Neptune High School), the Group II title in 2010 (vs. Chatham High School), 2011 (vs. Pascack Hills High School), 2012 (vs. Point Pleasant Borough High School) and 2013 (vs. Willingboro High School), and won the Group I title in 2014 (vs. Haddon Township High School); the 11 state championships are the most of any public school in the state and the five consecutive titles from 2010 to 2014 is tied for the longest streak by a public school program. The girls' basketball team won the 2003 Tournament of Champions, defeating Marlboro High School 48–45 in the tournament final. After four consecutive titles in Group II, the team won the 2014 Group I title with an 80–49 win against Haddon Township in the championship game.

The football team won the North II Group I state sectional championship in 2014, 2017 and 2023. The team defeated Dunellen High School by a score of 14–6 to win the program's first championship and the first title for a Newark high school since 2007. In 2017, the team defeated the top-seeded Weequahic High School by a score of 35–0 in the North II Group I state sectional final played at Kean University, in a rematch of the 2016 final that had been won by Weequahic. The 2023 team won the program's third sectional title with a 40-13 win against Butler High School in the tournament final. 2009 marked the return of the Thanksgiving Day game called the "Soul Bowl" between Weequahic and Shabazz High School, which had last been played in 1993 and had been in abeyance due to the two schools being placed in different athletic conferences. The 2011 game was the 29th between the two teams, ending in a 27–20 win for Weequahic, which won its fifth consecutive defeat of Shabazz. The intra-district football rivalry with Weequahic was ranked third on NJ.com's 2017 list "Ranking the 31 fiercest rivalries in N.J. HS football". Shabazz leads the series with an overall record of 35–28–6 through the 2017 season.

The boys track team won the Group I spring / outdoor track state championship in 2018.

The boys track team experienced significant success during the 2024–25 season. In 2025, the boys' indoor track team won the Nike Indoor Nationals 4×400 meter relay championship and the Millrose Games Boys Suburban 4×400 meter relay title. The team also won the North II Group II sectional championship and the Super Essex Conference championship.

That summer, 3 members of the track program helped the Newark-based club team, RDE Bulldogs, win the Adidas Outdoor Nationals sprint medley relay title and break the meet record.

The program continued its success during the 2025–26 season, winning conference and county relay championships and producing multiple All-Americans and nationally ranked relay teams. That season, the boys' 4×800 meter relay team won the NJSIAA Meet of Champions title.

== The Future Project ==
According to Ted Dintersmith and Tony Wagner, the authors of the book Most Likely to Succeed: Preparing Our Kids for the Innovation Era, Divine Bradley of The Future Project and the school's principal, Gemar Mills, worked together to address what they described as one of the "country's most troubled high schools". The school was being considered for closure, and when Mills joined in 2011 there had been four principals in as many years. The city's schools had been part of an unsuccessful $100 million effort to improve the schools.

According to Dintersmith and Wagner, Shabazz High School students are being prepared to be successful through innovative methods. Divine reaches out to students on an individual basis and asks, "What's something big and bold you'd like to do with your life to make your world better? I'm here to help you." Dintersmith and Wagner state that "Most students have never been asked about life goals before. As a result of this kind of engagement, students at Shabazz rise to challenges, take on ambitious projects, and approach education and life with newfound purpose." School attendance has improved and students participate in programs during lunch, and outside of school hours, like classes that develop writing, communication, and collaboration skills.

== Administration ==
The school's principal is Atiba Buckman. Her administration team includes the two vice principals.

== Notable alumni ==
- Matee Ajavon (born 1986, class of 2004), former WNBA player for the Washington Mystics
- John Alexander (1896–1986), football player who played in the NFL for the Milwaukee Badgers and New York Giants, who is best known for becoming the first person to have played outside linebacker
- Hasson Arbubakrr (born 1960), former American football defensive end who played in the NFL with the Minnesota Vikings and Tampa Bay Buccaneers, and in the CFL with the Winnipeg Blue Bombers and Ottawa Rough Riders
- Anthony Avent (born 1969), former NBA player for several teams, most recently of the Los Angeles Clippers
- Vivian Blaine (1921–1995), actress
- Reggie Brown (born 1960), running back and coach who played in the NFL for the Atlanta Falcons and Philadelphia Eagles
- Leslie Fiedler (1917–2003, class of 1934), literary critic
- Gloria Gaynor (born 1943, class of 1961), singer, best known for the disco era hits that include "I Will Survive" and "Never Can Say Goodbye"
- Ben Goldfaden (1913–2013), professional basketball player who played two games in the Basketball Association of America (BAA) as a member of the Washington Capitols
- Cleo Hill (1938–2015), professional basketball player who played one season in the NBA for the St. Louis Hawks
- Cissy Houston (1933–2024, born Emily Drinkard), Grammy Award-winning singer
- R. Graham Huntington (1897–1957), politician who served three terms in the New Jersey General Assembly representing Essex County
- Sharpe James (1936–2025), politician and convicted felon who served as the 37th mayor of Newark and in the New Jersey Senate
- Theodore N. Kaufman (1910–1986), American Jewish businessman and writer known for his racist and eliminationist views on Germans, including in his 1941 book Germany Must Perish!
- Ed Koch (1924–2013), former Mayor of New York City, graduated from the school in 1941 when it was South Side High School
- Greg Latta (1952–1994), former tight end for the Chicago Bears
- Al Lavan (1946–2018), former college football head coach for the Delaware State Hornets, who played in the NFL for the Atlanta Falcons
- Bobby Malkmus (1931–2025, class of 1949), former professional baseball infielder who played in MLB for the Milwaukee Braves, Washington Senators and Philadelphia Phillies
- Bernard Marcus (1929–2024, class of 1947), co-founder of Home Depot
- Helen Miller (born 1945), politician who has served in the Iowa House of Representatives since 2003
- Amir Pinnix (born 1985), former college football running back for the Minnesota Golden Gophers
- Stylez G. White (born 1979 as Greg White), defensive end for the Tampa Bay Buccaneers
- Eric Williams (born 1972), basketball player who played 13 seasons in the NBA
- Keith Willis (born 1959), former American football defensive lineman who played in the NFL for the Pittsburgh Steelers, Buffalo Bills and Washington Redskins
- Lonnie Wright (1945–2012), who played in the AFL with the Denver Broncos and the ABA with the Denver Nuggets
- Lewis Yablonsky (1924–2014), sociologist, criminologist, author, and psychotherapist best known for his innovative and experiential work with gang members

== Notable faculty ==
- Divine Bradley (born 1982), youth mentor, motivational speaker and community leader, who has worked at the school as Dream Director as part of the Future Project
- Donald M. Payne (1934–2012), politician represented New Jersey's 10th congressional district from 1989 to 2012 after working as a teacher and football coach at South Side High School

== See also ==
- Bibliography of Malcolm X
- Bibliography of Martin Luther King Jr.
