= Joe Louis Clark =

American educator (1938–2020)

- Born: Joe Louis Clark; May 8, 1938; Rochelle, Georgia, U.S.
- Died: December 29, 2020 (aged 82); Newberry, Florida, U.S.
- Education: William Paterson University (BA); Seton Hall University (MA)
- Spouse: Gloria
- Children: 3, including Joetta and Hazel

Joe Louis Clark (May 8, 1938 – December 29, 2020) was an American educator and administrator, who was best known for his tenure as principal of Eastside High School in Paterson, New Jersey from 1982 to 1989. He gained national attention for his unconventional and controversial disciplinary measures while leading the school, and was the subject of the 1989 film Lean on Me, starring Morgan Freeman.

== Early life ==
Clark was born in Rochelle, Georgia, on May 8, 1938. At the age of 6, Clark moved with his family to Newark, New Jersey, where he would graduate from Central High School. He went on to earn a bachelor's degree from William Paterson College, and master's degree from Seton Hall University. Clark received a honorary doctorate from the U.S. Sports Academy.

Clark was a Sergeant in the U.S. Army Reserve, where he was assigned as a drill sergeant. He was selected for honoris causa membership in Omicron Delta Kappa in 1997 at SUNY Plattsburgh.

== Career ==
Clark began his career at the elementary school level, and later ran the camps and playgrounds system for Essex County, New Jersey.

=== Eastside High School ===
In 1982, he was appointed principal of Eastside High.

Clark was seen as an educator who was not afraid to get tough on difficult students, one who would often carry a bullhorn or a baseball bat at school. When criticized for this, Clark explained the bat was never meant to be used as a weapon, but rather as a metaphor for life: "A student could either strike out or hit a home run."

During his time as principal, Clark expelled over 300 students who were frequently tardy or absent from school, sold or used drugs in school, or caused trouble in school. Though some argue that his tough practices made the school far safer, its academic accomplishments remained woefully inadequate. "While math scores are up 6% during Clark's reign, reading scores have barely budged: they remain in the bottom third of the nation's high school seniors. While a few more students are going to college -- 211, up from 182 in 1982 -- Clark has lost considerable ground in the battle against dropouts: when he arrived, Eastside's rate was 13%; now [in 1988] it is 21%." In 1986, he had the school's doors chained shut to keep intruders away, though city officials eventually ordered them to be removed, saying that the practice represented a violation of fire safety laws.

Clark's tough tactics earned him substantial attention, with particular praise from President Ronald Reagan; in 1988, Clark was briefly considered for a position in the Reagan White House. He was the subject of a Time magazine cover story, which noted that Clark's style as principal was primarily disciplinarian in nature, focused on encouraging school pride and good behavior, although Clark was also portrayed as a former social activist in the film Lean on Me. "Clark's use of force may rid the school of unwanted students," commented Boston principal Thomas P. O'Neill Jr., "but he also may be losing kids who might succeed." George McKenna, former principal of Washington Preparatory High School in Los Angeles, often cited as a contemporary of Joe Clark as a school reformer with a similarly outgoing approach, was also critical. "Our role is to rescue and to be responsible," McKenna told Time. "If the students were not poor black children, Joe Clark would not be tolerated."

Other educators defended and praised Clark. "You cannot use a democratic and collaborative style when crisis is rampant and disorder reigns," said Kenneth Tewel, a former principal. "You need an autocrat to bring things under control." Some critics focused on the fact that while Clark had reestablished cleanliness and order, education scores had not substantially improved, which resulted in Eastside High being taken over by the state one year after Clark's departure in 1991, the very outcome he sought to avoid.

Separate criticism focused on the social impact of expelling delinquent students to improve test scores, claiming that "tossing out the troublesome low achievers" simply moved the problems from the school onto the street. Clark defended the practice, saying teachers should not have to waste their time on students who do not want to learn; Time noted that the national dropout rate for such students remained high across the country and, with few alternatives available, each inner city school that had been able to reverse the trend had done so through "a bold, enduring principal" such as Clark. Further, he was "able to maintain or restore order without abandoning the students who are in trouble."

After his tenure as principal of Eastside High concluded in 1989, Clark became a public speaker.

=== Essex County Detention House ===
In 1995, he was appointed director of the Essex County Detention House in Newark, New Jersey, a juvenile detention facility. He resigned in 2002, amid an investigation into whether he was allowing the use of excessive force and punitive punishments against detainees, which included placing some detained children in handcuffs for up to 11 days, or in straitjackets for up to a day; and in other instances, detaining some children to their cells for 23 hours a day, for over a month in some cases. The state's Juvenile Justice Commission also cited him for allowing the facility to be filmed for a television program.

Clark defended his tactics, saying that the official guidelines were "anarchistic" and unsafe, and resigned in protest of the commission, who he dismissed as "regal-minded, nonsensical, condescending louts".

== Personal life ==
Clark was the father of Olympic track athletes, daughters Joetta Clark Diggs and Hazel Clark, and J.J. Clark, his son, who is a track coach. He was also the father-in-law of Olympic track athlete Jearl Miles Clark.

He resided in Newberry, Florida during his retirement. He died at home on December 29, 2020, at the age of 82.

== See also ==
- List of teachers portrayed in films
