= Lean on Me (film) =

1989 film by John G. Avildsen

- Theatrical release poster
- Directed by: John G. Avildsen
- Written by: Michael Schiffer
- Produced by: Norman Twain
- Starring: Morgan Freeman; Beverly Todd; Robert Guillaume
- Cinematography: Victor Hammer
- Edited by: John G. Avildsen; John Carter
- Music by: Bill Conti
- Production company: Norman Twain Productions
- Distributed by: Warner Bros.
- Release date: March 3, 1989
- Running time: 108 minutes
- Country: United States
- Language: English
- Budget: $10 million
- Box office: $31.9 million

Lean on Me is a 1989 American fictionalized biographical drama film directed by John G. Avildsen, written by Michael Schiffer, and starring Morgan Freeman. It is based on the story of Joe Louis Clark, an inner city high school principal in Paterson, New Jersey, whose school Eastside High is in danger of being placed into receivership of the New Jersey state government unless students improve their test scores on the New Jersey Minimum Basic Skills Test.

The title refers to the 1972 Bill Withers song of the same name, which is used in the film. The film was released on March 3, 1989. It received mixed reviews from critics and grossed $31 million.

== Plot ==
In 1987, the once idyllic Eastside High School in Paterson, New Jersey, has deteriorated due to drug use and rampant crime throughout the school. The majority of the student body cannot pass basic skills testing, and even the teachers are not safe from gang violence. Mayor Don Bottman learns that the school will be turned over to state administration unless 75% of the students can pass the minimum basic skills test. He consults with school superintendent Dr. Frank Napier, who suggests they hire elementary school principal Joe Louis Clark, a former Eastside teacher who was forcibly transferred years earlier, as the new school principal. Reluctantly, Bottman hires Clark.

Known as "Crazy Joe", Clark's immediate radical changes include expelling 300 students identified as drug dealers/users and troublemakers, instituting programs to improve school spirit including painting over graffiti-covered walls, and requiring students to learn the school song or be punished if they cannot sing it on demand. When one of the expelled students is found beating up another student, Kid Ray, Clark orders the school doors to be chained shut during school hours since there are insufficient funds to purchase security doors.

Clark's actions begin to have a positive effect on his students. He encounters Thomas Sams, a freshman expelled for smoking crack and cutting class who convinces Clark to give him one more chance to clean up his act and redeem himself or risk permanent expulsion. Clark also reunites one of his old elementary school students, Kaneesha Carter, with her estranged mother.

Some parents react strongly to these measures, particularly Leonna Barrett, the mother of one of the expelled students, who pressures Bottman to remove Clark. Clark’s radicalism also brings him into conflict with members of his faculty, including English teacher and football coach Larry Darnell, who had earlier been reassigned from head coach to assistant coach in an effort to improve discipline and the football team’s performance, and music teacher Mrs. Elliott; both are suspended for perceived insubordination. Napier admonishes Clark for these incidents and urges him to be a team player, prompting Clark to reinstate Darnell.

Unfortunately, a practice basic skills test fails to garner enough passing students. Clark confronts his staff for failing to educate their students and prepare them for the post-high school world. Mrs. Levias subsequently confronts Clark, feeling he needs to better empower the students for the test. Clark institutes a tutoring program to strengthen academic skills and encourages remedial reading courses on Saturdays so that parents may attend alongside their children if they want or need to.

When the day for the minimum basic skills test finally arrives, the students are much better prepared and filled with a sense of self-worth. Before the scores can be calculated, Fire Chief Gaines raids Eastside and discovers the chained doors. Clark is arrested for violating fire safety codes. That evening, the students gather at the meeting of the Paterson Board of Education, where Barrett, a newly appointed member of the school board, leads the call for Clark's removal.

The students demand that Clark be released from jail and retained as principal. Bottman has Clark released from jail so that he may urge the children to return home for their own safety. He is interrupted by assistant principal Joan Levias, who reports that more than 75% of the students have passed the basic skills test. He announces the results over his bullhorn.

As a result, the school's current administration remains intact. Clark is allowed to keep his job as principal, and he cheerfully tells Bottman that he "can tell the state to go to hell!" The students celebrate by breaking into their school song. The film ends with Eastside's senior class, including Thomas Sams, graduating amid the closing credits as Clark hands them their diplomas.

== Cast ==
- Morgan Freeman as Joe Louis Clark
- Beverly Todd as Ms. Joan Levias
- Robert Guillaume as Dr. Frank Napier
- Alan North as Mayor Don Bottman
- Lynne Thigpen as Leona Barrett
- Robin Bartlett as Mrs. Elliott
- Michael Beach as Mr. Larry Darnell
- Ethan Phillips as Mr. Rosenberg
- Sandra Reaves-Phillips as Mrs. Powers
- Sloane Shelton as Mrs. Hamilton
- Jermaine 'Huggy' Hopkins as Thomas Sams
- Karen Malina White as Kaneesha Carter
- Karina Arroyave as Maria
- Ivonne Coll as Mrs. Santos
- Regina Taylor as Mrs. Carter
- Michael P. Moran as Mr. Ed O'Malley
- John Ring as Chief Gaines
- Tyrone Jackson as Clarence
- Alex Romaguera as Kid Ray
- Tony Todd as William Wright
- Mike Starr as Mr. Zirella
- Yvette Hawkins as Mrs. Arthur
- Nicole Quinn as Lillian
- Elsie Hilario as Louisa
- Steven Lee as Richard Armand
- Michael Joseph as Brian Banes
- Richard Grusin as Mr. Danley
- Jim Moody as Mr. Lott
- Raul Gonzales as Ramon
- Luz Tolentino as Conchita
- Delilah Cotto as Chita
- Michael Imperioli as George
- Marcella Lowery as Mrs. Richards
- Knowl Johnson as Tom
- Bruce Malmuth as the Burger Joint Manager
- Riff (Michael Best, Steven Capers Jr., Anthony Fuller, Dwayne Jones, and Kenneth Kelly) as the Eastside Songbirds

== Production ==
Parts of the film, including the elementary school scenes, were filmed in Franklin Lakes, New Jersey.

== Music ==
Songs included in the film include:

- "Eastside High School Alma Mater", written by Catherine Peragallo Miller
- "Welcome to the Jungle" by Guns N' Roses
- "I Ain't Makin' It" by Daddy-O and DBC
- "Lean on Me" by Thelma Houston and The Winans
- "Lean on Me" by Club Nouveau
- "Rap Summary (Lean on Me)" by Big Daddy Kane
- "You Are the One" by TKA
- "Skeezer" by Roxanne Shante
- "After 12" by Force MDs
- "All the Way to Love" by Siedah Garrett
- "Everybody Is Somebody" by Riff, Teen Dream, and Taja Sevelle
- "Hit the Road Jack" by Percy Mayfield

== Reception ==
=== Critical response ===
On review aggregator website Rotten Tomatoes, the film has a rating of 71%, based on 21 reviews, with an average rating of 5.8/10. On Metacritic the film has an average score of 58 out of 100 based on 13 reviews, indicating "mixed or average" reviews. Audiences polled by CinemaScore gave the film a rare grade of "A+" on an A+ to F scale.

=== Accolades ===
1989 NAACP Image Awards

- Outstanding Lead Actor in a Motion Picture – Morgan Freeman (won)
- Outstanding Motion Picture (won)

1990 Young Artist Awards

- Young Artist Award Best Motion Picture – Drama (nominated)
- Best Young Actor Supporting Role in a Motion Picture – Jermaine 'Huggy' Hopkins (nominated)
- Best Young Actress Supporting Role in a Motion Picture – Karen Malina White (nominated)
- Jackie Coogan Award – Norman Twain, producer (nominated)

== Television adaptation ==
On September 13, 2018, it was reported that a television series based on the film was in development at The CW. The Warner Bros. Television Studios project was written by Wendy Calhoun, with LeBron James, Maverick Carter, John Legend, Mike Jackson and Ty Stiklorius also set to executive produce. The female-led drama was to center around "when a spirited young black teacher [named] Amarie Baldwin scores the principal job at an Akron, Ohio, public high school, she must dig deep to transform a failing campus into an urban oasis. In a time when education and school safety have life-or-death stakes, Amarie will take on a broken system that tests her mettle, love life and family. But can she keep her moxie in check in order to embody the aspirational educator that motivates and uplifts an entire community?" On February 8, 2019, it was revealed that the script was not picked up to be a television pilot.

== See also ==
- List of hood films
