= Paterson Public Schools =

School district in Passaic County, New Jersey, US

Address
- 90 Delaware Avenue Paterson, Passaic County, New Jersey, 07501; United States
- Coordinates: 40.917545°N 74.170203°W

District information
- Motto: Paterson - A Promising Tomorrow
- Grades: PreK to 12
- Superintendent: Laurie W. Newell
- Business administrator: June Gray
- School board: Eddie Gonzalez; Joel D. Ramirez Valerie Freeman; Della McCall; Hector L. Nieves, Jr.; Mohammed H. Rasid; Kenneth Rosado; Kenneth L. Simmons; Corey Teague
- Chair of the board: Eddie Gonzalez
- Schools: 43
- NCES District ID: 3412690
- Affiliation: Former Abbott district

Students and staff
- Enrollment: 24,692 (as of 2023–24)
- Faculty: 1,762.0 FTEs
- Student–teacher ratio: 14.0:1

Other information
- District Factor Group: A
- Website: www.paterson.k12.nj.us
Ind.	Per pupil	District spending	Rank (*)	K-12 average	%± vs. average
1A	Total Spending	$20,454	78	$18,891	8.3%
1	Budgetary Cost	16,323	83	14,783	10.4%
2	Classroom Instruction	8,993	64	8,763	2.6%
6	Support Services	3,565	98	2,392	49.0%
8	Administrative Cost	1,576	71	1,485	6.1%
10	Operations & Maintenance	2,070	87	1,783	16.1%
13	Extracurricular Activities	54	1	268	−79.9%
16	Median Teacher Salary	54,182	6	64,043
Data from NJDoE 2014 Taxpayers' Guide to Education Spending. *Of K-12 districts with more than 3,500 students. Lowest spending=1; Highest=103

The Paterson Public Schools (PPS) is a comprehensive community public school district that serves students in pre-kindergarten through twelfth grade from Paterson, in the U.S. state of New Jersey. The district is one of 31 former Abbott districts statewide that were established pursuant to the decision by the New Jersey Supreme Court in Abbott v. Burke which are now referred to as "SDA Districts" based on the requirement for the state to cover all costs for school building and renovation projects in these districts under the supervision of the New Jersey Schools Development Authority.

As of the 2023–24 school year, the district, comprised of 43 schools, had an enrollment of 24,692 students and 1,762.0 classroom teachers (on an FTE basis), for a student–teacher ratio of 14.0:1.

Among the 594 students who took the SAT in 2013, the mean combined score was 1120 and there were 19 students (3.2% of those taking the exam) who achieved the combined score of 1550 that the College Board considers an indicator of college readiness, a decline from the 26 students (4.3%) who achieved the standard the previous year.

District enrollment in Paterson surged at the start of the 2015–16 school year, creating a public school enrollment of 700 students higher than expected and putting the school district in a situation of needing to hire teachers rapidly not long after the district had laid off 300 positions.

== History ==
The district had been one of two districts in New Jersey (along with Newark Public Schools) under "state intervention", which authorizes the commissioner of education to intervene in governance of a local public school district (and to intervene in the areas of instruction and program, operations, personnel, and fiscal management) if the commissioner has determined that a school district failed or was unable to take corrective actions necessary to establish a thorough and efficient system of education. Initiated in 1991 as part of an effort to improve academic performance in the district and lasting for three decades, state control of the district ended in January 2021.

Governor of New Jersey Jon Corzine announced in March 2009 that he was recommending the appointment of Donnie W. Evans as the district's superintendent, with the State Board of Education ratifying the nomination of Evans by Lucille Davy, Commissioner of the New Jersey Department of Education.

The district had been classified by the New Jersey Department of Education as being in District Factor Group "A", the lowest of eight groupings. District Factor Groups organize districts statewide to allow comparison by common socioeconomic characteristics of the local districts. From lowest socioeconomic status to highest, the categories are A, B, CD, DE, FG, GH, I and J.

== Schools ==
Schools in the district (with 2023–24 enrollment data from the National Center for Education Statistics) are:

Early Learning Centers

- Anna Iandoli Early Learning Center (PK; 90 students)

Elementary Schools

- Dale Avenue School (PK-2; 246 students; 25 teachers)
- Edward W. Kilpatrick School (PK-3; 300 students; 28 teachers)
- Full Service Community School / School 15 (PK-5; 545 students; 47 teachers)
- School 27 (PK-5; 643 students; 49 teachers)
- Charles J. Riley / School 9 (PK-8; 726 students; 62 teachers)
- Dr. Martin Luther King Jr. Educational Complex (PK-8; 505 students; 42.5 teachers)
- School 16 (PK-8; 840 students; 56 teachers)
- School 21 (PK-8; 642 students; 42.5 teachers)
- Fine & Performing Arts Program / School 24 (PK-8; 651 students; 61.5 teachers)
- School 25 (PK-8; 540 students; 435 teachers)
- School 26 (PK-8; 479 students; 31 teachers)
- School 28 (PK-8; 469 students; 38.5 teachers)
- School 19 (K-4; 314 students; 24 teachers)
- Roberto Clemente School (K-5; 267 students; 20.5 teachers)
- Renaissance One School of Humanities / School 1 (K-5; 216 students; 21 teachers)
- School 5 (K-5; 763 students; 58 teachers)
- School 7 (K-5; 286 students; 23 teachers)
- Alexander Hamilton Academy (K-8; 488 students; 32 teachers)
- Norman S. Weir School (K-8; 270 students; 23 teachers)
- School 2 (K-8; 511 students; 41 teachers)
- School 3 (K-8; 218 students; 28 teachers)
- School 8 (K-8; 401 students; 34 teachers)
- School 10 (K-8; 455 students; 32 teachers)
- School 12 (K-8; 482 students; 41 teachers)
- School 13 (K-8; 484 students; 35 teachers)
- School 20 (K-8; 345 students; 33 teachers)
- Senator Frank Lautenberg School / School 6 (K-8; 628 students; 32 teachers)
- Rev. Dr. Frank Napier Jr. School of Technology / School 4 (1–8; 502 students; 37.5 teachers)
- School 18 (1–8; 651 students; 60.5 teachers)
- Young Men's Academy (3–8; 60 students; 7 teachers)

Middle Schools

- Dr. Hani Awadallah School (6–8; 564 students; 53.5 teachers)
- Joseph A. Taub School (6–8; 968 students; 54 teachers)
- New Roberto Clemente School (6–8; 545 students; 52 teachers)

High schools

- Alozno "Tambua" Moody Academy / School 11 (Alternative High School 9–12; 118 students; 23 teachers)
- Eastside High School (9–12; 2,087 students; 131 teachers)
- International High School (9–12; 662 students; 50 teachers)
- John F. Kennedy High School (9–12; 1,794 students; 143 teachers)
- Newcomers High School (9–12; 82 students; 5 teachers)
- Paterson P-Tech High School (9–12; 200 students; 14 teachers)
- Paterson STEAM High School (9–12; 325 students; 26 teachers)
- Rosa L. Parks School of Fine and Performing Arts (9–12; 257 students; 27 teachers)
- Students Transitioning and Achieving Real Success (S.T.A.R.S.) (Special Education 9–12; 111 students; 8 teachers)

== Administration ==
Core members of the district's administration are:

- Laurie W. Newell, superintendent of schools
- June Gray, business administrator

== Board of education ==
The district's board of education, comprised of nine members, sets policy and oversees the fiscal and educational operation of the district through its administration. As a Type II school district, the board's trustees are elected directly by voters to serve three-year terms of office on a staggered basis, with three seats up for election each year held (since 2014) as part of the November general election. The board appoints a superintendent to oversee the district's day-to-day operations and a business administrator to supervise the business functions of the district.

The district voted in September 2013 voted by a 5–4 margin to move school elections from April to November. An attempt by members of the Paterson City Council in January 2022 to shift elections back to April failed after the vote ended in a 4–4 tie.
