= Hamilton High School =

Hamilton High School may refer to:

== United States ==
=== Alabama ===
- Hamilton High School (Alabama) in Hamilton

=== Arizona ===
- Hamilton High School (Chandler, Arizona) in Chandler

=== Arkansas ===
- Lake Hamilton High School in Pearcy

=== California ===
- Hamilton High School (Anza, California)
- Hamilton Union High School in Hamilton City
- Alexander Hamilton High School (Los Angeles)

=== Georgia ===
- Hamilton High School (Scottdale, Georgia) in Dekalb County; served African American students until desegregation in 1969

=== Illinois ===
- Hamilton High School (Hamilton, Illinois)

=== Massachusetts ===
- Hamilton-Wenham Regional High School in South Hamilton

=== Michigan ===
- Hamilton High School (Michigan) in Hamilton

=== Montana ===
- Hamilton High School (Montana) in Hamilton

=== New Jersey ===
In Hamilton Township, Mercer County:

- Hamilton High School East, or Steinert High School
- Hamilton High School North, or Nottingham High School
- Hamilton High School West, or Hamilton High School

=== New York ===
- Alexander Hamilton Jr./Sr. High School in Elmsford
- Alexander Hamilton High School (Brooklyn) in Brooklyn
- Fort Hamilton High School in Brooklyn

=== Ohio ===
- Hamilton High School (Hamilton, Ohio)
- Hamilton Catholic High School in Hamilton
- Hamilton Township High School in Columbus

=== Tennessee ===
- Hamilton High School (Memphis, Tennessee)

=== Texas ===
- Hamilton High School (Texas) in Hamilton

=== Virginia ===
- Hamilton High School (Cartersville, Virginia)

=== Wisconsin ===
- Alexander Hamilton High School (Milwaukee, Wisconsin)
- Hamilton High School (Sussex, Wisconsin)

=== Fictional ===
- The false name given to the high school in The World We Created at Hamilton High, a 1988 non-fiction book by Gerald Grant

== Other countries ==
=== New Zealand ===
- Hamilton High School, New Zealand, later split into two single-sex schools

- Hamilton Boys' High School in Hamilton
- Hamilton Girls' High School in Hamilton

=== Zimbabwe ===
- Hamilton High School (Bulawayo)
