= Brad Jenkins =

Brad Jenkins may refer to:

- Brad Jenkins (American football) (born c. 1954), American football player and coach
- Brad Jenkins (producer), American producer
- Brad Jenkins, character in Almost Normal
