= Jim McKeown =

Jim McKeown may refer to:

- James McKeown (missionary), Scottish missionary who founded the Church of Pentecost
- James McKeown, Irish football goalkeeper who plays for Grimsby Town
- Jim McKeown (soccer) (born 1956), retired American soccer defender
- Jim McKeown (racing driver), Australian racing driver

== See also ==
- James McKeown (born 1989), English-born Irish professional footballer
