= Saquan Hampton =

American football player (born 1995)

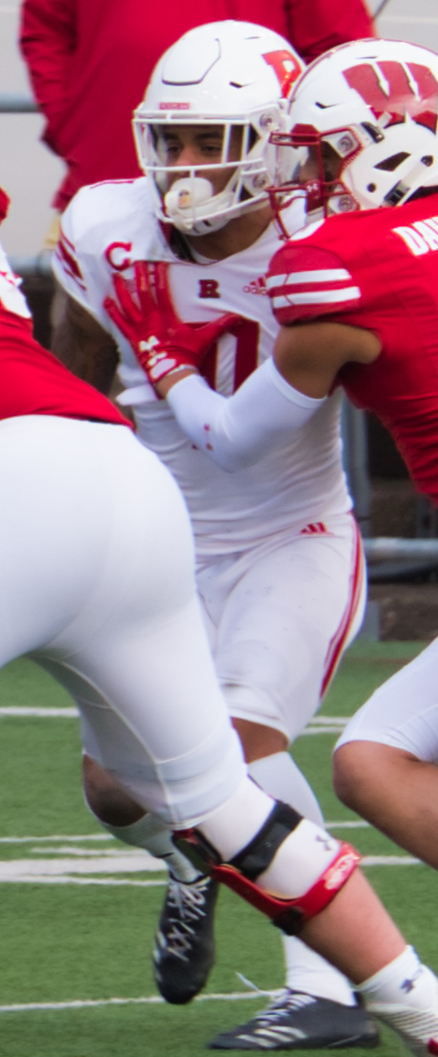
- Hampton with the Rutgers Scarlet Knights in 2018

No. 29, 33
- Position: Safety

Personal information
- Born: December 12, 1995 (age 30); Hamilton Township, New Jersey, U.S.
- Listed height: 6 ft 1 in (1.85 m)
- Listed weight: 206 lb (93 kg)

Career information
- High school: Nottingham (Hamilton Township)
- College: Rutgers (2014–2018)
- NFL draft: 2019: 6th round, 177th overall pick

Career history

Playing
- New Orleans Saints (2019–2020); New York Jets (2020–2021); Edmonton Elks (2022)*; New Orleans Breakers (2023)
- * Offseason or practice squad member only

Coaching
- Portland High School (ME) (2024) Defensive backs coach

Career NFL statistics
- Total tackles: 1
- Stats at Pro Football Reference

Saquan Hampton (born December 12, 1995) is an American former professional football player who was a safety in the National Football League (NFL). He played college football for the Rutgers Scarlet Knights and was selected by the New Orleans Saints in the sixth round of the 2019 NFL draft.

== Early life ==
Raised in Hamilton Township, Mercer County, New Jersey, Hampton attended Nottingham High School, where he was named New Jersey First Team All-Group IV, First Team All-South Jersey, and First Team All-Colonial Valley Conference honors after registering 17 tackles, 4 interceptions, averaging more than 38 yards per kickoff return, 13 yards per punt return on defense his senior season. He was named the Delaware Valley's Player of the Year by the 12th Man Touchdown Club Dinner. He was a key member of the school's Central Jersey Group III championship as a junior.

Rivals rated Hampton, a consensus three-star recruit, its 23rd-best prospect. He committed to Rutgers on National Signing Day in 2014 citing his desire to stay close to home.

== College career ==
Hampton attended Rutgers University, where he majored in labor and employment relations. In 2018, Hampton tied for the Big Ten Conference lead in passes defended by safeties, including three interceptions, two of which came in week 9 against Wisconsin. Combined with his ten tackles that game, he was named Reese's Senior Bowl Defensive Player of the Week.

Senior Bowl Executive Director Jim Nagy pointed out:

"The first thing that will catch scouts' attention is that Hampton has a background at cornerback, which is important in the sense that he has more experience in man coverage, even if it's just at the high school level, than most safety prospects.

The attribute that showed up most in the game against the Badgers was his ball skills. During our tape study, we liked him the most when the ball was in the air. On both his two picks last Saturday, one when he drove on an out route and another where he undercut a corner route, Hampton looked really natural playing the ball.

The other aspect of Hampton's game that stood out last week was his deep field instincts. Scouts determine where to project safeties, either free or strong, based on where they look most natural playing and Hampton looks most comfortable in the middle of the field. Some guys have a feel for routes and Hampton consistently put himself in the position to make plays."

On November 27, 2018, Hampton was named unanimous All-Big Ten Honorable Mention by coaches and media. He was awarded the 2018 Homer Hazel Award as Rutgers' team MVP.

== Professional career ==
=== Pre-draft ===
In the lead-up to the 2019 NFL draft, Hampton accepted an invitation to the East-West Shrine Game. He was also invited to participate in the 2019 NFL Draft Combine.

Following the week of the Shrine Game, Bleacher Report's Matt Miller included Hampton among the "2019 NFL Draft's Biggest Winners from NFLPA Bowl, Shrine Game Weeks," noting, "He's a hitter with a fierce mentality and has the athleticism and size to become an NFL contributor."

Pre-draft measurables
Height	Weight	Arm length	Hand span	40-yard dash	Broad jump	Bench press
6 ft 1 1/4 in (1.86 m)	206 lb (93 kg)	31 5/8 in (0.80 m)	8 5/8 in (0.22 m)	4.48 s	10 ft 5 in (3.18 m)	14 reps
All values are from NFL Scouting Combine

=== New Orleans Saints ===
Hampton was selected by the New Orleans Saints in the sixth round (177th overall) of the 2019 NFL draft. He played in five games before being placed on injured reserve on December 17, 2019.

Hampton was waived/injured by the Saints during final roster cuts on September 5, 2020, and subsequently reverted to the team's injured reserve list the next day. He was waived with an injury settlement on September 14.

=== New York Jets ===
On November 3, 2020, Hampton was signed to the practice squad of the New York Jets. He was promoted to the active roster on December 12. On December 16, Hampton was placed on injured reserve. He was waived with a failed physical designation on May 7, 2021, and reverted to the team's reserve/physically unable to perform list on May 10. He was released on September 28.

=== Edmonton Elks ===
Hampton signed with the Edmonton Elks of the Canadian Football League on April 15, 2022. He was released on May 14.

=== New Orleans Breakers ===
On February 11, 2023, Hampton signed with the New Orleans Breakers of the United States Football League (USFL). The Breakers folded when the XFL and USFL merged to create the United Football League (UFL).

== Coaching career ==
After the New Orleans breakers folded, Hampton moved to Portland, Maine in order to be with his girlfriend, Kaylee Pao. Around this time, Pao suggested to Hampton that he should try coaching.

In February 2024, Portland High School head coach Sean Green announced that Hampton would be the defensive backs coach for the team going into that season. During that season, Hampton guided the Bulldogs to their first Maine Class A state title in 22 years.

In 2025, Hampton announced he would resign at his position, citing his desire to move to Florida in order to be with his family.
