= Edgebrook, New Jersey =

Edgebrook, New Jersey may refer to:

- Edgebrook, Mercer County, New Jersey
- Edgebrook, Middlesex County, New Jersey
