= Jayson DiManche =

Haitian American football player (born 1990)

Jayson Dimanche
No. 50, 51
- Position: Linebacker

Personal information
- Born: Trenton, New Jersey, U.S.
- Listed height: 6 ft 1 in (1.85 m)
- Listed weight: 232 lb (105 kg)

Career information
- High school: Hamilton West (Hamilton, NJ)
- College: Southern Illinois
- NFL draft: 2013: undrafted

Career history
- Cincinnati Bengals (2013–2014); Kansas City Chiefs (2015)*; Cleveland Browns (2015); Cincinnati Bengals (2016)*; Detroit Lions (2016)*; San Francisco 49ers (2017)*
- * Offseason or practice squad member only

Career NFL statistics
- Total tackles: 28
- Forced fumbles: 1
- Stats at Pro Football Reference

Jayson Dimanche is a Haitian-American former professional football linebacker. He was originally signed by the Cincinnati Bengals as an undrafted free agent in 2013. He played college football at Southern Illinois.

== Early life ==
He attended Hamilton High School West in Hamilton Township, Mercer County, New Jersey. He was selected to the first-team Trentonian all-area and Trenton Times all-county, and second-team Asbury Park Press all-state during his senior season in high school. He was selected as the Hamilton West High School defensive MVP and Hardest Hitter Award. In 2006, he was selected to the Second-team all-area and all-county teams while at high school. He had a total of 253 tackles and 30 sacks in three prep seasons while at high school.

== College career ==
In his freshman season, Dimanche was selected to the MVFC Academic Honor Roll. In his sophomore season, he was selected as an Honorable Mention All-MVFC. He was selected as the MVFC Defensive Player of the Week after his outstanding regular season performance when he recorded a career-high three sacks in a regular season win over No. 21 Western Illinois during his sophomore season. During his junior season, Dimanche was among the student-athletes that were named to the MVFC Academic Honor Roll. In his last season at Southern Illinois, he was selected as team captain on August 25, 2012. He was selected to the CFPA linebacker award watch list during preseason. He was named to the second-team All-MVFC following the conclusion of his senior season. He recorded 49 Tackles, 8 Sacks, 2 pass deflections, and a fumble recovery in his senior season. He finished college with a total of 145 tackles, 19 sacks, three forced fumbles, six pass deflections, and one interception.

== Professional career ==
=== Cincinnati Bengals (first stint) ===
On April 27, 2013, he signed with the Cincinnati Bengals as an undrafted free agent following the 2013 NFL draft. Dimanche recorded his first NFL career forced fumble against the New Orleans Saints on November 16, 2014. He was waived-injured by the Bengals on September 5, 2015. He cleared waivers and was reverted to the Bengals' injured reserve list. On September 11, 2015, Dimanche was released by the Bengals with an injury settlement.

=== Kansas City Chiefs ===
The Kansas City Chiefs signed Dimanche to their practice squad on October 13, 2015.

=== Cleveland Browns ===
On October 20, 2015, the Cleveland Browns signed Dimanche off the Chiefs' practice squad. On December 23, 2015, the Cleveland Browns promoted Dimanche to the 53-man roster and placed wide receiver Andrew Hawkins to the injured reserve. On December 31, 2015, the Cleveland Browns waived Dimanche.

=== Cincinnati Bengals (second stint) ===
On January 5, 2016, the Bengals signed Dimanche to their practice squad. On August 29, 2016, Dimanche was waived by the Bengals.

=== Detroit Lions ===
On August 30, 2016, Dimanche was claimed off waivers by the Detroit Lions. On September 3, 2016, he was waived by the Lions.

=== San Francisco 49ers ===
On April 7, 2017, Dimanche signed with the San Francisco 49ers. On May 2, 2017, Dimanche was waived by the 49ers. He was re-signed on August 5, 2017. He was waived/injured on August 16, 2017, and placed on injured reserve. On August 21, 2017, the 49ers waived Dimanche from IR with an injury settlement.

== Coaching career ==
DiManche signed with Athletes Untapped as a private football coach on March 6, 2025.

== Personal life ==
He is the son of Haitian immigrants. His father is a truck driver and his mother is a manager. His younger brother played college football as a linebacker for Stony Brook from 2017 to 2022.
