= Nottingham, New Jersey =

Populated place in Mercer County, New Jersey, US

- Unincorporated community
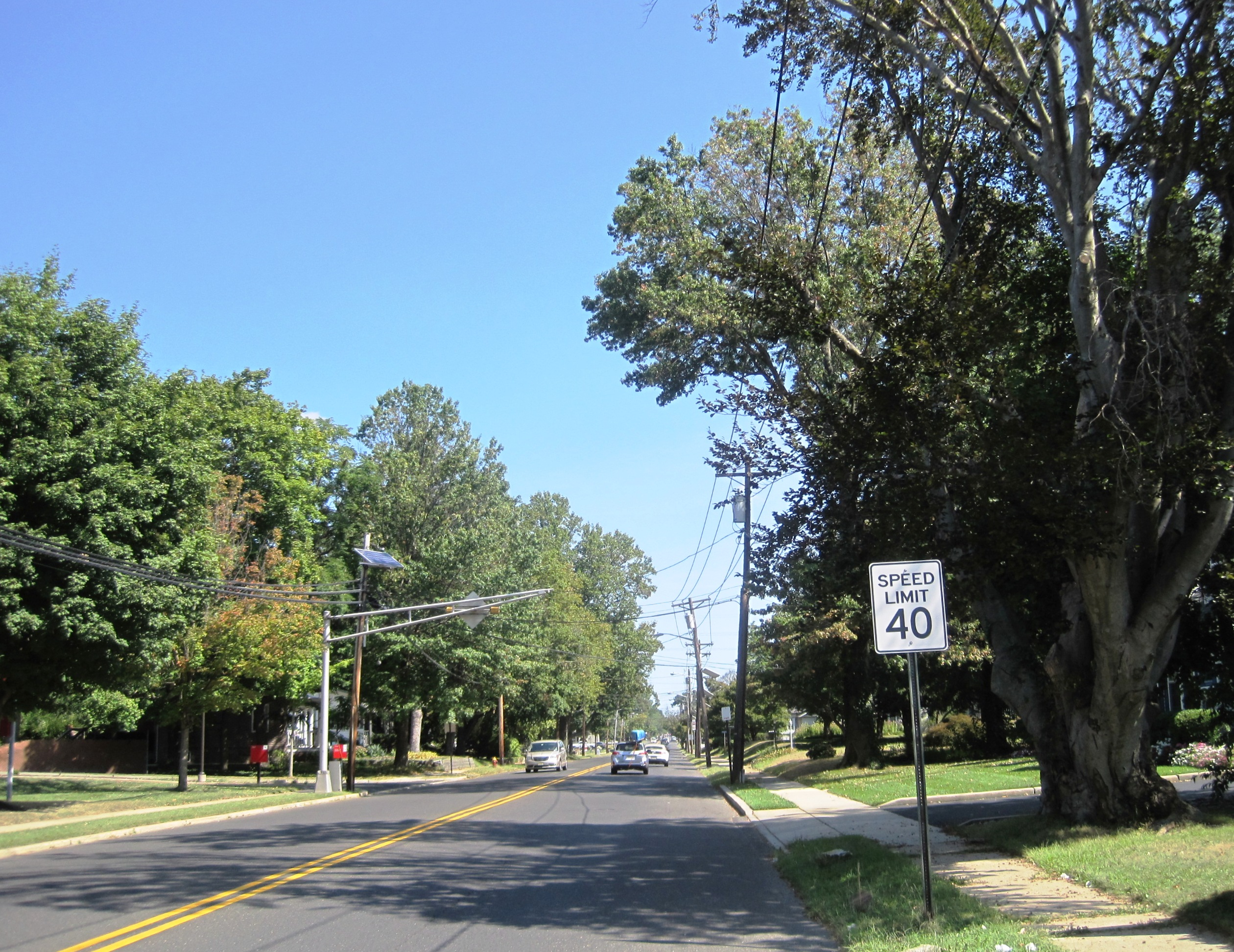

- Location within Mercer County, New Jersey Location within New Jersey Location within the United States
- Coordinates: 40°13′57″N 74°40′55″W
- Country: United States
- State: New Jersey
- County: Mercer
- Township: Hamilton
- Elevation: 92 ft (28 m)
- GNIS feature ID: 878895

Nottingham is an unincorporated community located within Hamilton Township in Mercer County, in the U.S. state of New Jersey. It was named after the English town of Nottingham when the area was settled by English emigrants entering an area of Dutch culture just two decades removed from the land being part of New Netherland, Dutch Empire.

Nottingham is in the Mercerville-Hamilton Square area. Settled earlier, Nottingham is the original settlement in the former Nottingham Township (1688-1856). The neighboring unincorporated community of Sandtown was renamed Mercerville after the Battle of Princeton. Most or all of Nottingham was renamed Hamilton Square after Alexander Hamilton in a wave of anti-British sentiment at the time of the War of 1812. But local people still call the community Nottingham, because a large minority did not agree with the name change, and the center of Hamilton Square was a different neighborhood. Nottingham has maintained its sense of neighborhood because of continuity with street names and social events.
