= Colin Ferrell =

American football player and coach (born 1984)

San Diego State Aztecs
- Title: Edges coach

Personal information
- Born: November 11, 1984 (age 41); Hamilton Township, Mercer County, New Jersey
- Listed height: 6 ft 0 in (1.83 m)
- Listed weight: 301 lb (137 kg)

Career information
- High school: Steinert High School; Hightstown (NJ) Peddie School
- College: Kent State (2004–2007)
- NFL draft: 2008: undrafted

Career history

Playing
- Indianapolis Colts (2008)*
- * Offseason or practice squad member only

Coaching
- Hun School of Princeton (2009–2011) Assistant coach; Steinert HS (NJ) (2012) Assistant coach; Kent State (2013–2015) Defensive graduate assistant; Kent State (2016–2017) Defensive line coach; Kent State (2017) Interim head coach; Kent State (2018) Outside linebackers coach; Kent State (2019–2023) Defensive line coach; Rutgers (2024–2025) Defensive line coach; San Diego State (2026–present) Edges coach

Colin Ferrell (born November 11, 1984) is an American former football defensive tackle for the Indianapolis Colts of the National Football League. He was originally signed by the Indianapolis Colts as an undrafted free agent in 2008. He played college football at Kent State.

Ferrell grew up in Hamilton Township, Mercer County, New Jersey, played high school football at Steinert High School, played a post-graduate year at the Peddie School in Hightstown, New Jersey, and played collegiate football at Kent State University.
