= Nottingham High School (New Jersey) =

High school in Mercer County, New Jersey, US

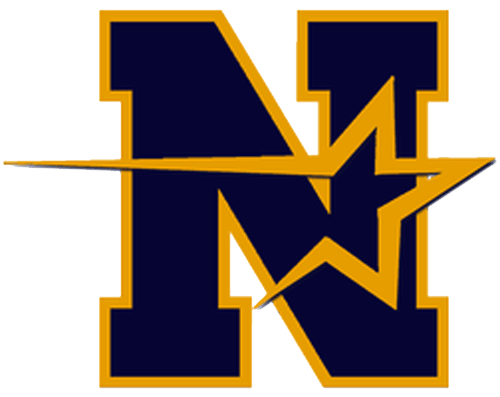

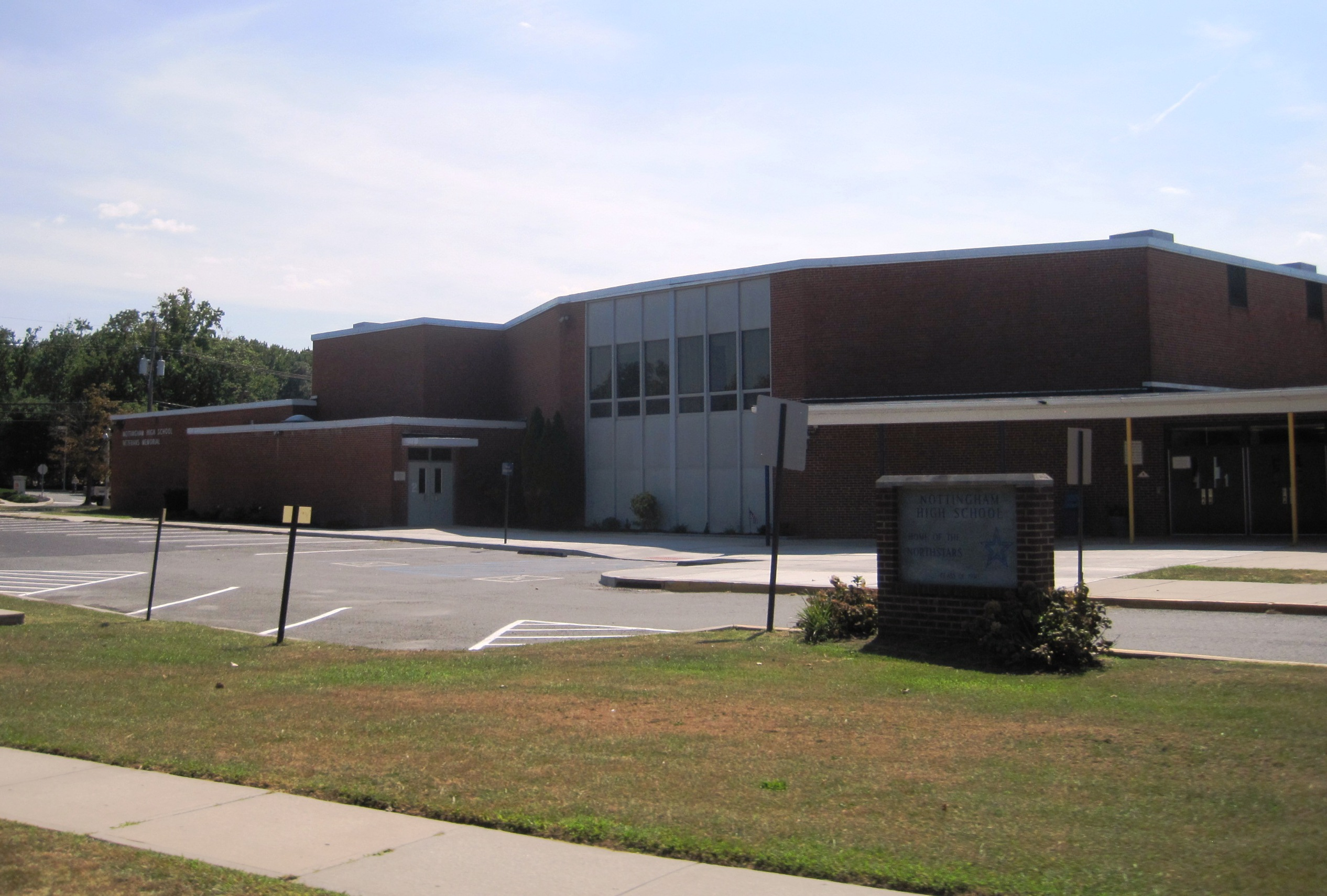
- Nottingham High School Northstars

Location
- 1055 Klockner Road; Hamilton Township, New Jersey, (Mercer County) 08619; United States
- Coordinates: 40.2298°N 74.7086°W

Information
- Other names: Hamilton High School North
- Type: Public high school
- Motto: Ad Astra Per Aspera
- School district: Hamilton Township School District
- NCES School ID: 340654005933
- Principal: Frank Ragazzo
- Faculty: 85.0 FTEs
- Grades: 9-12
- Enrollment: 1,086 (as of 2023–24)
- Student to teacher ratio: 12.8:1
- Colors: Navy blue and gold
- Athletics: Football, basketball, baseball, wrestling, cross country, field hockey, ice hockey, golf, soccer, softball, swimming, tennis, track, lacrosse
- Athletics conference: Colonial Valley Conference (general); West Jersey Football League (football)
- Mascot: Polaris
- Team name: Northstars
- Publication: Caelestis (literary magazine)
- Newspaper: Star Status
- Website: hhn.htsdnj.org

Nottingham High School (also formally known as Hamilton High School North) is a four-year comprehensive public high school serving students in ninth through twelfth grades located in Hamilton Township, in Mercer County, in the U.S. state of New Jersey, operating as one of the three secondary schools of the Hamilton Township School District; the other high schools in the district are Hamilton High School West and Steinert High School (Hamilton High School East).

As of the 2023–24 school year, the school had an enrollment of 1,086 students and 85.0 classroom teachers (on an FTE basis), for a student–teacher ratio of 12.8:1. There were 452 students (41.6% of enrollment) eligible for free lunch and 141 (13.0% of students) eligible for reduced-cost lunch.

== Awards, recognition and rankings ==
Nottingham High School was the recipient of U.S. News & World Report's Bronze recognition for America's Best High Schools in both 2017 and 2018. Nottingham received an overall Niche grade of a B+ and was ranked as the seventh most diverse public high school in New Jersey. This school was the 231st-ranked public high school in New Jersey out of 339 schools statewide in New Jersey Monthly magazine's September 2014 cover story on the state's "Top Public High Schools", using a new ranking methodology. The school had been ranked 276th in the state of 328 schools in 2012, after being ranked 264th in 2010 out of 322 schools listed. The magazine ranked the school 260th in 2008 out of 316 schools. The school was ranked 246th in the magazine's September 2006 issue, which surveyed 316 schools across the state.

== Athletics ==
The Nottingham High School Northstars compete in the Colonial Valley Conference, which operates under the supervision of the New Jersey State Interscholastic Athletic Association. With 898 students in grades 10–12, the school was classified by the NJSIAA for the 2019–20 school year as Group III for most athletic competition purposes, which included schools with an enrollment of 761 to 1,058 students in that grade range. The football team competes in the Capitol Division of the 94-team West Jersey Football League superconference and was classified by the NJSIAA as Group III South for football for 2024–2026, which included schools with 695 to 882 students.

The school participates as the host school / lead agency for a joint ice hockey team with Hamilton High School West and Steinert High School. The co-op program operates under agreements scheduled to expire at the end of the 2023–24 school year.

Nottingham's wrestling team is referred as the Northstars. The Nottingham boys' swimming team had been to the NJSIAA state tournament for seven consecutive years from 2000 to 2006. The boys' baseball team won the 2008 Mercer County Tournament beating Notre Dame. The 2009 girls' spring track team was the first in Nottingham history to participate in the Penn Relays. The 2011 Nottingham boys track team was the first ever team in Nottingham history to go undefeated, winning the Mercer County Tournament and the Central Jersey Group III sectional championships.

The girls' softball team won the Group III state championship in 1987 (defeating runner-up West Morris Mendham High School in the tournament final) and 1990 (vs. Morris Hills High School). The 1987 team won the Group III title by a score of 2–1 against West Morris Mendham in the championship game. The 1990 team finished the season with a 24–3 record after a 6–4 victory against Morris Hills in the playoff finals.

Nottingham's 2012 football team won the Central Jersey Group III state championship game after defeating Neptune High School by a final score of 35–24 in a game played at The College of New Jersey. The team finished with a record of 11–1, earning the program's first state title and becoming the first Mercer County team since 1989 to win a football championship.

In 2018, the boys' basketball team defeated Chatham High School by a score of 60–53 in the tournament final at Rutgers University to win the school's first ever Group III state championship for basketball.

The boys indoor / winter track team won the Group III state championship in 2020.

Fall	Coach	Winter	Coach	Spring	Coach
Football	Milo McGuire	Girls' Basketball	Kyle James	Girls' Spring Track	Andrew Parsons
Girls' Soccer	Nicole Sullivan	Boys' Basketball	Chris Raba	Boys' Spring Track	Robert Harris
Boys' Soccer	Nicholas Durante	Baseball	Charles Iacono	Field Hockey	Jessica Mull
Ice Hockey	Alexdru Chis-luca	Softball	Lindsey Diamond	Cheerleading	Sunny Longo
Golf	Kyle Seeley	Marching Unit	Jennifer Klek		
Girls' Tennis	Kristen Dunham	Wrestling	Dennis Dressel	Boys' Tennis	Jessica Belmont
Cross Country	Andrew Parsons	Girls' Swimming	Andrew Parsons	Athletic Trainer	Samantha Quinnette
Debate	Christopher Cymbal	Boys' Swimming	Bryan Emmerson	Dance Team	Megan McDermott
Boys' Lacrosse	Jerry Lynch	Girls' Lacrosse	Nicole Sullivan	Step Team	Jennifer Tammaro

== Courses ==
Nottingham offers Advanced Placement program (AP) courses in AP United States History, AP European History, AP Computer Science, AP Biology, AP Psychology, AP Chemistry, AP Environmental Science, AP French, AP Spanish, AP English Literature and Composition, and AP United States Government.

There is a FIRST Robotics Competition team available. (TEAM 2191)

== Performances ==
The school has one core show every year, the Spring Musical.

Previous musicals include Damn Yankees (2011), High School Musical (2010) and Footloose (2009).

== Administration ==
The school's principal is Frank Ragazzo. His core administration team includes three vice principals and the athletic director.

== Notable alumni ==
- Saquan Hampton (born 1995, class of 2014), American football safety who played in the NFL for the New Orleans Saints
- Tyler Kliem (born 2002, class of 2020), Yiddishist, translator and researcher
- Zack Mesday (born 1994, class of 2013), American football free agent defensive end/linebacker who played college football for Temple University

== Sister schools ==
The two other high schools in the district (with 2023–24 enrollment data from the National Center for Education Statistics) are:

- Hamilton High School West (also known as Watson; 1,427 students)
- Steinert High School (East; 1,454)
