= Tad Kornegay =

American gridiron football player (born 1982)

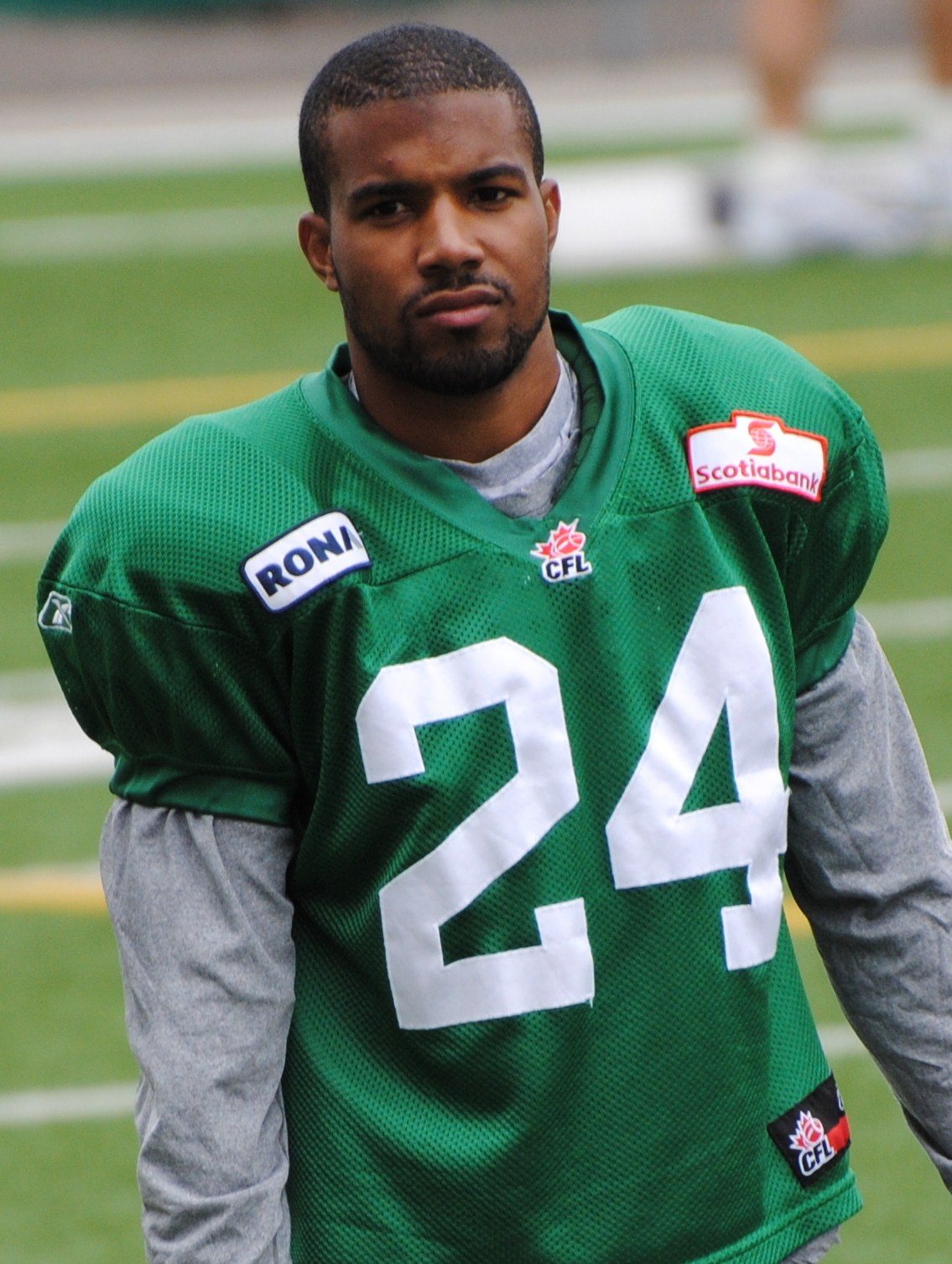
- Kornegay with the Saskatchewan Roughriders in 2010

No. 15, 17, 24, 11, 34
- Positions: Defensive back, linebacker

Personal information
- Born: July 13, 1982 (age 44); Trenton, New Jersey, U.S.
- Listed height: 5 ft 10 in (1.78 m)
- Listed weight: 185 lb (84 kg)

Career information
- High school: Hamilton (Hamilton Township, New Jersey)
- College: Fordham
- NFL draft: 2005: undrafted

Career history
- 2005–2007: Hamilton Tiger-Cats
- 2007–2011: Saskatchewan Roughriders
- 2011: BC Lions
- 2012: Calgary Stampeders

Awards and highlights
- 2× Grey Cup champion (2007, 2011); CFL West All-Star (2009)
- Stats at CFL.ca

Tad Kornegay (born July 13, 1982) is an American former professional football defensive back who played in the Canadian Football League (CFL) for the Hamilton Tiger-Cats, Saskatchewan Roughriders, BC Lions, and Calgary Stampeders.

== College career ==
Kornegay played four years (2001–2004) of college football at Fordham University. In his last season at Fordham, Kornegay was awarded the Vincent T. Lombardi Award as the school's male athlete of the year. He was a first team All Patriot League selection twice, and was a consensus First Team All-American in 2004. He received many other All-American honors after his senior season, including First Team Associated Press, American Football Coaches Association, Walter Camp Division I-AA and Sports Network I-AA. Kornegay was a finalist for the 2004 Buck Buchanan Award, which is given to the Division I-AA Defensive Player of the Year. He finished 14th in the final voting. He was inducted into the Fordham University Athletics Hall of Fame in 2011.

== Professional career ==
After his university career was complete, Kornegay signed a free agent contract with the Hamilton Tiger-Cats of the Canadian Football League. During his rookie season with Hamilton (2005), Kornegay dressed for all 18 regular season games and finished the season with 33 tackles, including special teams. In 2006, he played in 14 games and recorded 48 tackles and had his first career CFL interception.

Prior to the 2007 season, Kornegay was traded to the Saskatchewan Roughriders in exchange for Thyron Anderson and Jason French and played a key role in the Roughriders' 2007 Grey Cup Championship.

He was released by the Riders on July 20, 2011, and was later signed to the practice roster of the BC Lions on July 30, 2011. He would go on to start at defensive halfback for the final 13 regular season games of the season in addition to the West Final and Grey Cup. He won his second championship after the Lions won the 99th Grey Cup, but he was released during the off-season on January 16, 2012. On July 20, 2012, the Calgary Stampeders signed Kornegay. Calgary released Kornegay in January 2013.

Kornegay signed a one-day contract with the Saskatchewan Roughriders, as announced on August 26, 2014, by the Roughriders, so he could officially retire from the CFL while playing for the team he has been with for the majority of his CFL career.
