= Hamilton Township School District =

School district in Mercer County, New Jersey, US

Address
- 90 Park Avenue Hamilton Township, Mercer County, New Jersey, 08690; United States
- Coordinates: 40.232345°N 74.662797°W

District information
- Grades: PreK-12
- Superintendent: Scott R. Rocco
- Business administrator: Katherine Attwood
- Schools: 23

Students and staff
- Enrollment: 12,476 (as of 2025–26)
- Faculty: 990.15 FTEs
- Student–teacher ratio: 12.60

Other information
- District Factor Group: FG
- Website: www.htsdnj.org
Ind.	Per pupil	District spending	Rank (*)	K-12 average	%± vs. average
1A	Total Spending	$16,252	21	$18,891	−14.0%
1	Budgetary Cost	13,170	28	14,783	−10.9%
2	Classroom Instruction	8,124	26	8,763	−7.3%
6	Support Services	1,982	29	2,392	−17.1%
8	Administrative Cost	1,243	19	1,485	−16.3%
10	Operations & Maintenance	1,606	50	1,783	−9.9%
13	Extracurricular Activities	178	23	268	−33.6%
16	Median Teacher Salary	66,944	63	64,043
Data from NJDoE 2014 Taxpayers' Guide to Education Spending. *Of K-12 districts with more than 3,500 students. Lowest spending=1; Highest=103

The Hamilton Township School District is a comprehensive community public school district, serving students in pre-kindergarten through twelfth grade from Hamilton Township, in Mercer County, in the U.S. state of New Jersey. The district is one of the state's ten largest and consists of 17 elementary schools, three middle schools and three high schools along with an alternative program.

As of the 2025-26 school year, the district, comprising 23 schools, had an enrollment of 12,476 students and 990.15 classroom teachers (on an FTE basis), for a student–teacher ratio of 12.60.

The district is classified by the New Jersey Department of Education as being in District Factor Group "FG", the fourth-highest of eight groupings. District Factor Groups organize districts statewide to allow comparison by common socioeconomic characteristics of the local districts. From lowest socioeconomic status to highest, the categories are A, B, CD, DE, FG, GH, I and J.

== Schools ==
Schools in the district (with 2021–22 enrollment data from the National Center for Education Statistics) are:

Elementary schools

- Alexander Elementary School (with 351 students; in grades K–5)
  - Joseph Bookholdt, principal
- Greenwood Elementary School (236; K–5)
  - Nicole Dickens-Simon, principal
- Kisthardt Elementary School (231; K–5)
  - Dr. Diana Vasil, principal
- Klockner Elementary School (234; PreK–5)
  - Rashaan Monroe, principal
- Kuser Elementary School (398; PreK–5)
  - Nydia Peake, principal
- Lalor Elementary School (317; K–5)
  - Jennifer Marinello, principal
- Langtree Elementary School (393; PreK–5)
  - Melissa Persichetti, principal
- McGalliard Elementary School (250; K–5)
  - Dana Diquinzio, principal
- Mercerville Elementary School (328; K–5)
  - Donna Scarabaggio, principal
- Morgan Elementary School (276; K–5)
  - Michael Giambelluca, principal
- Robinson Elementary School (401; K–5)
  - Dr. Kristia Greenberg, principal
- Sayen Elementary School (260; K–5)
  - Jessica Young, principal
- Sunnybrae Elementary School (275; K–5)
  - Roberto Kesting, principal
- University Heights Elementary School (336; PreK–5)
  - Michelle Dailey, principal
- George E. Wilson Elementary School (418; PreK–5)
  - Dereth Sanchez-Ahmed, principal
- Yardville Elementary School (302; PreK–5)
  - Richard Czyz, principal
- Yardville Heights Elementary School (261; K–5)
  - Jason Chirichella, principal

Middle schools

- Richard C. Crockett Middle School (999; 6–8)
  - Matthew Finacchio, principal
- Albert E. Grice Middle School (941; 6–8)
  - Dwayne Walker, principal
- Emily C. Reynolds Middle School (914; 6–8)
  - Patricia Landolfi-Collins, principal

High schools

- Nottingham High School (North) (985; 9–12)
  - Jason Chirichella, principal
- Hamilton High School West (1,447; 9–12)
  - Brian Smith, principal
- Steinert High School (East) (1,280; 9–12)
  - Bryan Rogers, principal

Other schools

- Hamilton Educational Program (HEP) High School
  - Catherine Nolan-Havens, supervisor

== Administration ==
Core members of the district's administration are:

- Scott R. Rocco, superintendent
- Katherine Attwood, business administrator and board secretary

== Board of education ==
The district's board of education, composed of nine members, sets policy and oversees the fiscal and educational operation of the district through its administration. As a Type II school district, the board's trustees are elected directly by voters to serve three-year terms of office on a staggered basis, with three seats up for election each year held (since 2012) as part of the November general election. The board appoints a superintendent to oversee the district's day-to-day operations and a business administrator to supervise the business functions of the district.
