= Zack Mesday =

American football player (born 1994)

No. 10
- Position: Defensive end

Personal information
- Born: October 25, 1994 (age 32); Trenton, New Jersey, U.S.
- Listed height: 6 ft 1 in (1.85 m)
- Listed weight: 245 lb (111 kg)

Career information
- High school: Nottingham High School
- College: Temple (2014–2019)

Career history
- Jersey Flight (2021)
- Stats at ESPN

Zachary John Mesday (born October 25, 1994) is an American former college football player who was a defensive end and linebacker for the Temple Owls. He was originally a walk-on and eventually earned a sixth year of eligibility and scholarship as a graduate student.

== Early life ==
Mesday was a defensive end, tight end and fullback at Nottingham High School in Hamilton Township, Mercer County, New Jersey, where he was a member of the 2012 Central Jersey Group III state title-winning team. He earned third-team All-State, first-team All-State Group III, first-team All South Jersey, first-team all-conference (7A)/county, New Jersey Super 100 All-State Team, conference lineman of the year, and four-time player of the week for Mercer County in his senior year. That season he recorded 106 tackles, 19.5 sacks, two interceptions, and six forced fumbles.

After receiving "a few D-II and I-AA offers but nothing with a full scholarship," he prepped a year and switched positions to linebacker as a postgraduate at the Canterbury School in New Milford, Connecticut.

== College years ==
Mesday went to Temple University as a preferred-walk-on with a chance to compete for a scholarship in 2014 and redshirted as a true freshman. In 2015 and 2016 he redshirted while recovering from knee surgeries. From 2014 to 2018 he was awarded named Athletic Director's Honor Roll five times. He saw his game first action in 2017. As a graduate in 2018 he finished third on the team in tackles for loss (8.0) and was named American Athletic Conference All-Academic Team. He was granted a sixth year of eligibility and as a graduate in 2019 he was named William Campbell Trophy semifinalist and to the American Football Coaches Association Good Works Team Watch List.

In 2020, Mesday was named to the National Football Foundation & College Hall of Fame Hampshire Honor Society, to which players are named for maintaining a cumulative 3.2 GPA or better throughout their college careers.

=== Career stats ===
	Defense						
Year	Team	TOT	SOLO	AST	SACK	FF	PD
2018	TU	33	22	11	4	2	0
2019	TU	25	15	10	4.5	0	1
	Total	58	37	21	8.5	2	1
