= Steinert High School =

High school in Mercer County, New Jersey, US

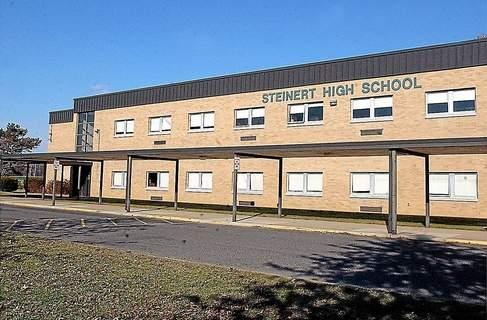

Location
- 2900 Klockner Road; Hamilton Township, Mercer County, New Jersey 08690; United States; 40.2163°N 74.6623°W

Information
- Other names: Hamilton High School East
- Type: Public high school
- Established: 1967
- School district: Hamilton Township School District
- CEEB code: 311483
- NCES School ID: 340654003090
- Principal: Bryan Rogers
- Faculty: 104.3 FTEs
- Grades: 9 - 12
- Enrollment: 1,437 (as of 2024–25)
- Student to teacher ratio: 13.8:1
- Colors: Dark Green; White
- Athletics: baseball, basketball, cheerleading, cross country, field hockey, football, golf, hockey, lacrosse, soccer, softball, swimming, track and field, tennis, wrestling
- Athletics conference: Colonial Valley Conference (general); West Jersey Football League (football)
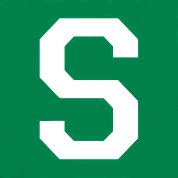
- Team name: Spartans
- Rivals: Hamilton High School West; Nottingham High School
- Feeder schools: Reynolds Middle School
- Director of Athletics: Bill James
- Website: hhe.htsdnj.org

Steinert High School (also formally known as Hamilton High School East) is a four-year comprehensive public high school serving students in ninth through twelfth grades as one of three secondary high schools that are part of the Hamilton Township School District, located in Hamilton Township in Mercer County, in the U.S. state of New Jersey; the other high schools in the district are Nottingham High School (Hamilton High School North) and Hamilton High School West. The school mascot is the Spartan.

As of the 2024–25 school year, the school had an enrollment of 1,437 students and 104.3 classroom teachers (on an FTE basis), for a student–teacher ratio of 13.8:1. There were 454 students (31.6% of enrollment) eligible for free lunch and 72 (5.0% of students) eligible for reduced-cost lunch.

== History ==
Officially named Joseph Steinert Memorial High School, the school opened in 1967 as the district's second secondary school. The school was named in honor of Steinert, who donated the land for the school.

== Awards, recognition and rankings ==
The school was the 148th-ranked public high school in New Jersey out of 339 schools statewide in New Jersey Monthly magazine's September 2014 cover story on the state's "Top Public High Schools", using a new ranking methodology. The school had been ranked 204th in the state of 328 schools in 2012, after being ranked 189th in 2010 out of 322 schools listed. The magazine ranked the school 199th in 2008 out of 316 schools. Schooldigger.com ranked the school as 176th out of 376 public high schools statewide in its 2010 rankings (an increase of 21 positions from the 2009 rank) which were based on the combined percentage of students classified as proficient or above proficient on the language arts literacy and mathematics components of the High School Proficiency Assessment (HSPA).

== AP Courses ==
Steinert offers Advanced Placement (AP) courses in AP United States History, AP European History, AP Computer Science, AP Computer Science Principles, AP Biology, AP Chemistry, AP Physics 1, AP Physics 2, AP English Literature and Composition, AP United States Government, AP Statistics, and AP Calculus.

== Sports ==
The Steinert High School Spartans compete in the Colonial Valley Conference, which is comprised of public and private high schools in the Mercer County area and operates under the supervision of the New Jersey State Interscholastic Athletic Association. With 920 students in grades 10–12, the school was classified by the NJSIAA for the 2019–20 school year as Group III for most athletic competition purposes, which included schools with an enrollment of 761 to 1,058 students in that grade range. The football team competes in the Valley Division of the 94-team West Jersey Football League superconference and is classified by the NJSIAA as Group IV South for football for 2024–2026, which included schools with 890 to 1,298 students.

The school maintains sports rivalries with fellow Hamilton schools: the Hamilton West Hornets and the Nottingham Northstars. Steinert plays against crosstown rival Hamilton West on Thanksgiving Day in football. The two schools have played each other on Thanksgiving Day since 1959 as the only Thanksgiving Day football game in Mercer County. The rivalry with Hamilton West was listed at 16th on NJ.com's 2017 list "Ranking the 31 fiercest rivalries in N.J. HS football". Hamilton West leads the rivalry with a 34–23–1 overall record as of 2017.

School colors are dark green and white. Sports offered include baseball (men), basketball (men and women), cross country (men and women), field hockey (women), football (men), golf (men), ice hockey (men), lacrosse (men and women), soccer (men and women), softball (women), swimming (men and women), tennis (men and women), track and field spring (men and women), wrestling (men), and cheerleading (women and men).

The school participates together with Hamilton High School West in a joint ice hockey team in which Nottingham High School is the host school / lead agency . The co-op program operates under agreements scheduled to expire at the end of the 2023–24 school year.

Baseball

The baseball team won the Group III state championship in 1978 (defeating Teaneck High School in the tournament's final game), 1998 (vs. Bayonne High School), 1999 (vs. Morris Knolls High School), 2000 (vs. Bloomfield High School), 2006 (vs. Randolph High School), and won the Group III title in 1992 (vs. Hoboken High School) and 1996 (vs. Nutley High School); the team's seven state titles are tied for fifth-most of any public school program in the state. The 1978 team finished the season at 20-4 after winning the Group III state title by defeating Teaneck by a score of 9–0 in the championship game. The 1992 baseball team defeated Hoboken by a score of 5–4, to win the NJSIAA Group III state championship and finish the year with a 31–1 record, the most wins ever recorded in a season by a Mercer County baseball school. The team was inducted into the Steinert Athletic Hall of Fame in 2008. The 1996 team finished the season with a 24–5 record after winning the Group III title after defeating Nutley by a score of 4–3 in the championship game. A 3–0 win against Bloomfield gave the 2000 team the Group IV state title and a 30–2 record for the season.

Cross country

The boys' cross country team won the Group III state championship in 1987.

Field hockey

The field hockey team won the North II Group IV state sectional championship in 2000 and the Central Jersey Group IV title in 2007. In 2007, the field hockey team won the Central Jersey, Group IV state sectional championship with a 1–0 win over Toms River High School South in the tournament final.

Football

The 1966 varsity football team led by Head Coach Pete Brescia had a perfect 9-0-0 record and remains the only unbeaten team in SHS history.

Boys' soccer

The boys' soccer team won the Group IV state championship in 1966 (as co-champion with Bloomfield High School), 1969 and 1970 (as co-champions with Hackensack High School both years), 1971 (vs. Kearny High School), 1973 (vs. John F. Kennedy High School of Paterson), 1975 (as co-champion with Kearny High School) and 1977 (vs. Livingston High School), and won the Group III state title in 1984 (vs. Indian Hills High School) and 1988 (vs. West Morris Mendham High School); the program's nine state titles are tied for third-most among all public school soccer teams. The 1969 team finished the season with a record of 18-0-2 after the Group IV title game against Hackensack ended in a 1–1 tie, making the two teams co-champions.

Girls' soccer

The girls' soccer team won the Group III state championship in 1988, defeating runner-up Indian Hills High School in the finals. In 2007, the team won the Central, Group IV state sectional championship with a 1–0 win over Jackson Memorial High School in the tournament final.

Softball

The softball team won the Group IV state championship in 2004 (defeating Clifton High School in the tournament final) and won the Group III title in 2016 (vs. Middletown High School South) and 2018 (vs. Indian Hills High School). The team won the 2018 Tournament of Champions against Immaculate Conception High School. The girls' softball team won the 2004 NJSIAA Group IV state championship against Clifton High School. The team won the 2016 Group III state title with a 6–2 win against Middletown High School South in the tournament's final round. The team won the 2018 Group III state title with a 2–0 win against Indian Hills High School and went on to win the Tournament of Champions and finish the season with a 26–5 record with a 9–0 win against Immaculate Conception of Lodi, with all nine runs scored in the first inning. NJ.com ranked Steinert as their number-one softball team in the state in 2018.

== Administration ==
The school's principal is Bryan Rogers. His core administration team includes the three vice principals and the athletic director.

== Sister schools ==
The two other high schools in the district (with 2024–25 enrollment data from the National Center for Education Statistics) are:

- Hamilton High School North (Nottingham High School) (also known as North; 1,147 students)
- Hamilton High School West (also known as Watson; 1,408 students)

== Notable alumni and staff ==
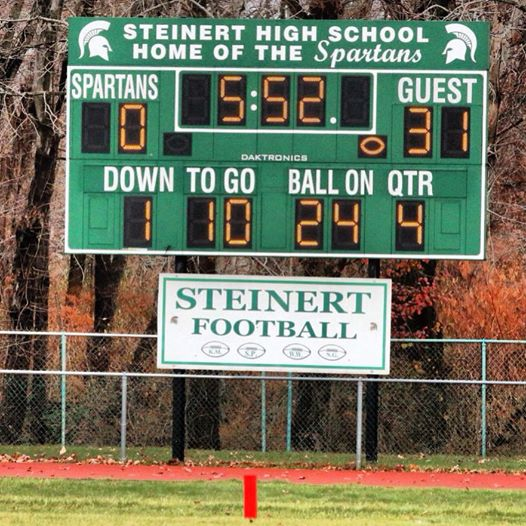
Scoreboard located at the Steinert High School football field.

People who graduated from Steinert High School include:

- Samuel Alito (born 1950, class of 1968), Associate Justice of the Supreme Court of the United States
- Bill Baroni (born 1971), former deputy executive director of the Port Authority of New York and New Jersey, former state senator and assemblyman for New Jersey's 14th legislative district, and petitioner in Kelly v. United States
- Erin Bowman (born 1990, class of 2008), singer-songwriter
- Wayne DeAngelo (born 1965), assemblyman for New Jersey's 14th legislative district since 2008
- Damon DiMarco (born 1971), author and oral historian
- Dan Donigan (born 1966, class of 1985), former professional soccer forward and head coach of Saint Louis University men's soccer team and Rutgers University men's soccer team
- Colin Ferrell (born 1984, class of 2002), defensive line coach for Rutgers University football team and former professional American football defensive tackle
- Dave Gallagher (born 1960, class of 1978), former Major League Baseball outfielder
- Lisa Gmitter-Pittaro (born 1965), former professional soccer player who made twelve appearances for the United States women's national team
- Alejandro Hernandez (class of 2008), actor who has appeared in New Amsterdam and The Horror of Dolores Roach
- Brad Jenkins, producer who is the managing director and executive producer of Funny or Die DC and is the former associate director of the White House Office of Public Engagement
- Dahntay Jones (born 1980, class of 1998), assistant coach for the Los Angeles Clippers and former National Basketball Association player
- Jim McKeown (born 1956, class of 1974), former professional soccer player
- Art Napolitano (born 1956, class of 1974), former professional soccer player
- Chris Pittaro (born 1961, class of 1979), former Major League Baseball player and current Oakland Athletics National Field Coordinator
- Bobby Smith (born 1951, class of 1969), former professional soccer player and National Soccer Hall of Fame inductee
- Sammy Williams (1948–2018), actor and winner of the 1976 Tony Award for Best Featured Actor in a Musical for A Chorus Line

Others who attended Steinert High School include:

- Eddie Gaven (born 1986), former Major League Soccer midfielder, once the youngest player in league history
- J. R. Smith (born 1985), former professional basketball player who played for 17 seasons in the NBA

Notable staff members include:

- Duane Robinson (born 1968), vice principal and former professional soccer player, who was the first overall pick of the Illinois Thunder in the 1990 National Professional Soccer League draft

== Gallery ==
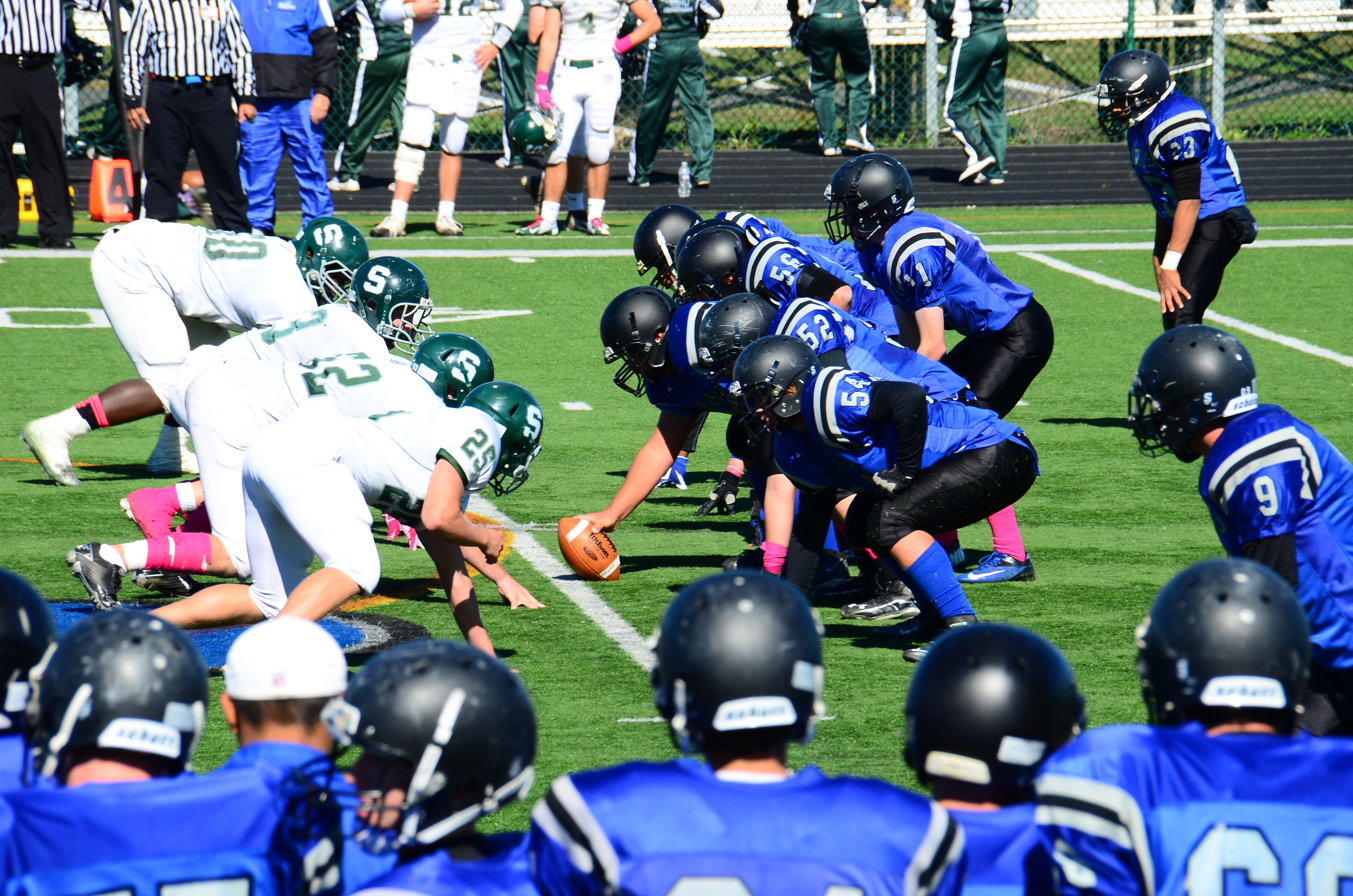
The Steinert Spartans play football vs. the WW-P Northern Knights

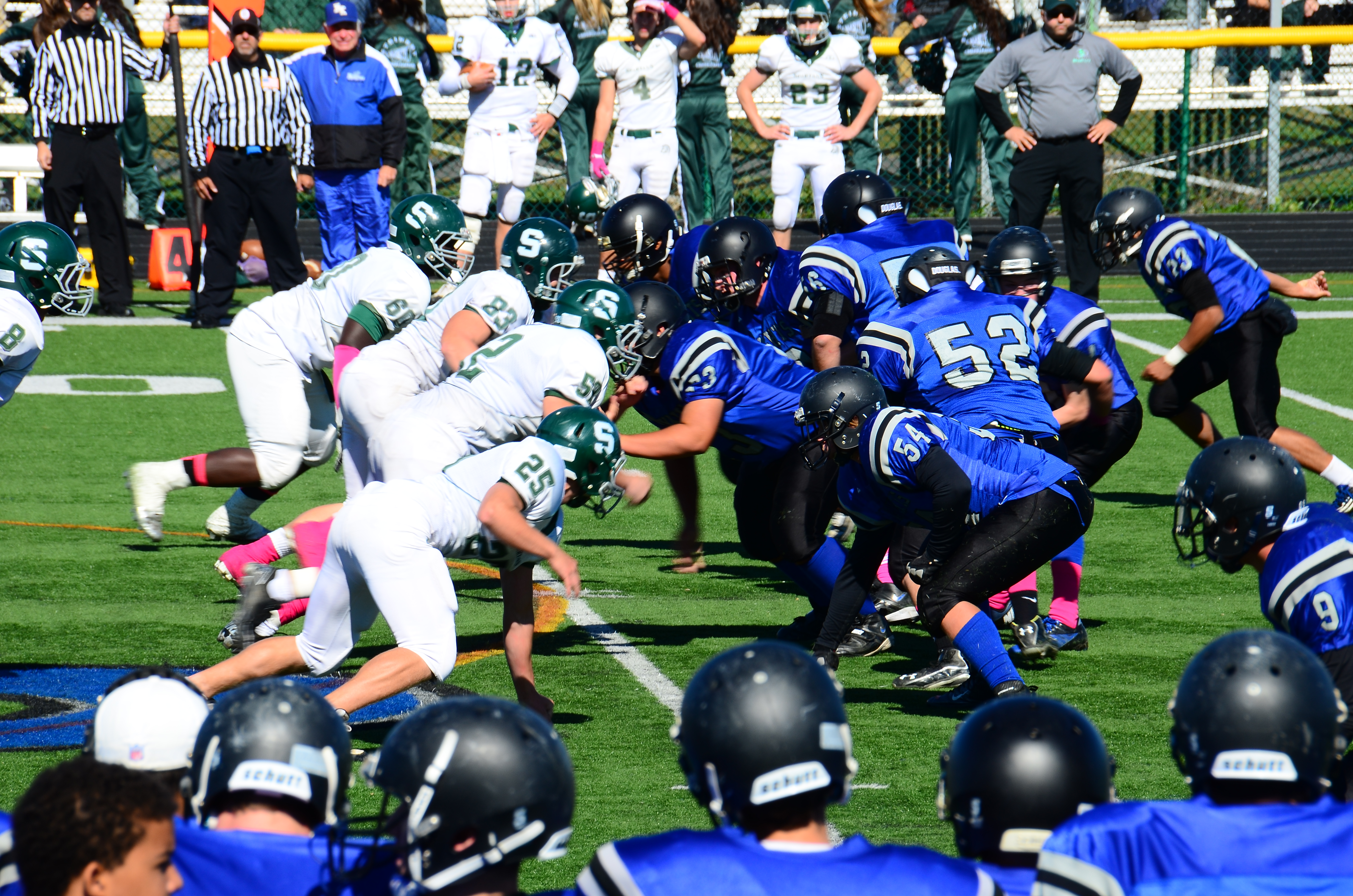
The Steinert Spartans play football vs. the WW-P Northern Knights
