= Hamilton High School West =

High school in Mercer County, New Jersey, US

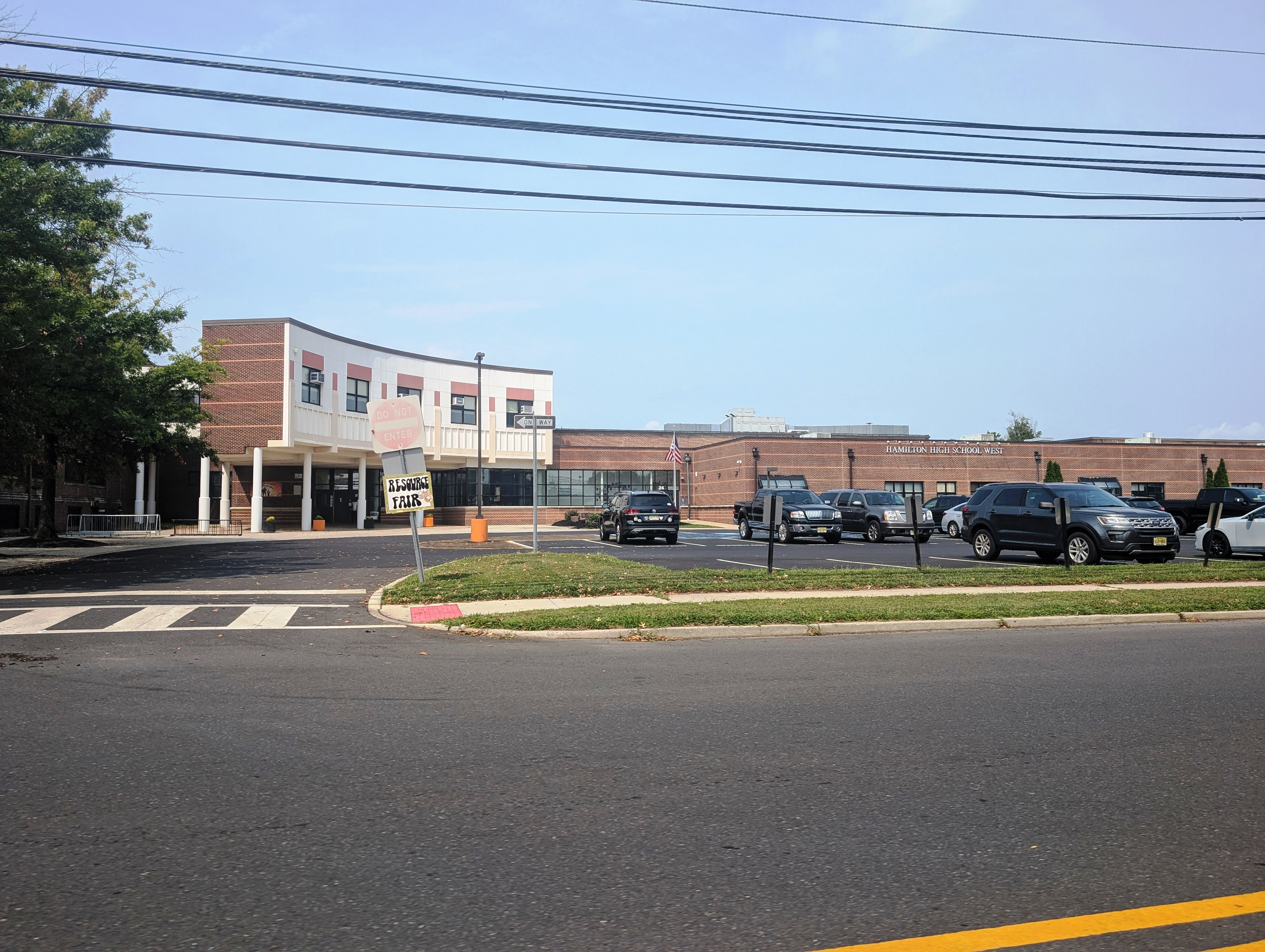

Location
- 2720 South Clinton Avenue; Hamilton Township, Mercer County, New Jersey 08610; United States
- Coordinates: 40.1992°N 74.7233°W

Information
- Type: Public
- Motto: "Tradition, Pride, and Excellence"
- School district: Hamilton Township School District
- NCES School ID: 340654003092
- Principal: Brian Smith
- Faculty: 100.9 FTEs
- Grades: 9-12
- Enrollment: 1,408 (as of 2024–25)
- Student to teacher ratio: 14.0:1
- Colors: Orange; Black
- Athletics conference: Colonial Valley Conference (general); West Jersey Football League (football)
- Team name: Hornets
- Rival: Hamilton High School East - Steinert
- Newspaper: Criterion
- Website: hhw.htsdnj.org

Hamilton High School West is a four-year comprehensive public high school serving students in ninth through twelfth grade located in Hamilton Township, in Mercer County, in the U.S. state of New Jersey, operating as one of the three secondary schools of the Hamilton Township School District; the other high schools in the district are Hamilton High School North-Nottingham High School and Hamilton High School East- Steinert High School.

As of the 2024–25 school year, the school had an enrollment of 1,408 students and 100.9 classroom teachers (on an FTE basis), for a student–teacher ratio of 14.0:1. There were 712 students (50.6% of enrollment) eligible for free lunch and 128 (9.1% of students) eligible for reduced-cost lunch.

== Awards, recognition and rankings ==
The school was the 222nd-ranked public high school in New Jersey out of 339 schools statewide in New Jersey Monthly magazine's September 2014 cover story on the state's "Top Public High Schools", using a new ranking methodology. The school had been ranked 275th in the state of 328 schools in 2012, after being ranked 258th in 2010 out of 322 schools listed. The magazine ranked the school 262nd in 2008 out of 316 schools. The school was ranked 240th in the magazine's 2008 issue, which surveyed 316 schools across the state.

== Athletics ==
The Hamilton High School Hornets compete in the Colonial Valley Conference, which is comprised of public and private high schools located in Mercer County and operates under the supervision of the New Jersey State Interscholastic Athletic Association (NJSIAA). With 933 students in grades 10-12, the school was classified by the NJSIAA for the 2022–23 school year as Group III for most athletic competition purposes, which included schools with an enrollment of 761 to 1,058 students in that grade range. The football team competes in the Capitol Division of the 94-team West Jersey Football League superconference and was classified by the NJSIAA as Group IV South for football for 2024–2026, which included schools with 890 to 1,298 students.

The school participates together with Hamilton High School East - Steinert in a joint ice hockey team in which Hamilton High School North - Nottingham is the host school / lead agency. The co-op program operates under agreements scheduled to expire at the end of the 2023–24 school year.

Hamilton West competes in an annual Thanksgiving Day football game against Steinert High School. The rivalry with Steinert was listed at 16th on NJ.com's 2017 list "Ranking the 31 fiercest rivalries in N.J. HS football". Hamilton West leads the rivalry with a 34–23–1 overall record as of 2017.

=== NJSIAA state championships ===
- Boys basketball - 1935, 1953, 2006 The 1935 team won the Group III state title with a 35-27 win in the playoff finals against Ridgefield Park. The 1953 team won the Group III title with a 56-52 win in the championship game against Linden. With a 66-34 win against Shabazz in the finals of the tournament played at Rutgers University, the 2006 team won the Group III state title and came into the Tournament of Champions as the sixth seed, falling by a score of 80-67 in the quarterfinals to third-seeded Haddonfield Memorial High School led by Brian Zoubek.
- Boys soccer - 1947, 1948, 1951, 1953, 1955, 1962, 1976
- Girls basketball - 1983 Group IV (vs. Plainfield High School)
- Girls softball - 1999
- Boys baseball - 2000

== Marching band ==
The Hamilton High School West Marching Band is a division of the Hamilton West Bands, which is comprised of the Marching Band, Symphonic Band, Saxophone Quartet, Brass Quintet and Jazz Ensembles. The Marching Band became competitive in the Fall of 2006, and competes in the USBands Marching Band Circuit. The Instrumental Program at Hamilton West was in place on the first day of school (September 8, 1930), and the first Director of Bands was Harlan D. Darling. The band is known as "The Pride of Mercer County." The school's fight song is called "Loyalty", and their Alma Mater is the melody of "Far Above Cayuga's Waters", which is the Alma Mater for Cornell University, and is played by the Marching Band at the end of every home football game.

== Administration ==
The school's principal is Brian Smith. His core administration team includes three vice principals and the athletic director.

== Sister schools ==
Hamilton High School West is the original Hamilton Township High School. The two other high schools in the district (with 2023–24 enrollment data from the National Center for Education Statistics) are:

- Hamilton High School North (Nottingham High School) (also known as North; 1,086 students)
- Steinert High School (East; 1,454)

== Notable alumni ==
- Christian Burns, (born 1985), professional basketball player for Germani Basket Brescia of the Italian Lega Basket Serie A
- Jayson DiManche (born 1990), linebacker for the Cincinnati Bengals
- Tom Goodwin (born c. 1951), politician and financial planner who was selected in March 2010 to represent the 14th Legislative District in the New Jersey Senate, after the resignation of Bill Baroni
- Jim Hoey (born 1982), pitcher for the Baltimore Orioles. The school retired Hoey's number in a ceremony held on February 1, 2007
- Kevin Johnson (born 1976), former NFL wide receiver for seven seasons for the Cleveland Browns, the Jacksonville Jaguars, the Baltimore Ravens and the Detroit Lions
- Tad Kornegay (born 1982) defensive back for the Saskatchewan Roughriders in the Canadian Football League
- Nicholas Olhovsky (born 1974, class of 1993), First Hierarch of the Russian Orthodox Church Outside of Russia and Metropolitan of Eastern America and New York since September 2022
- Bruce Ritter (1927-1999), Catholic priest and one-time Franciscan friar who founded Covenant House in 1972 for homeless teenagers and led it until he was forced to resign in 1990

== Gallery ==
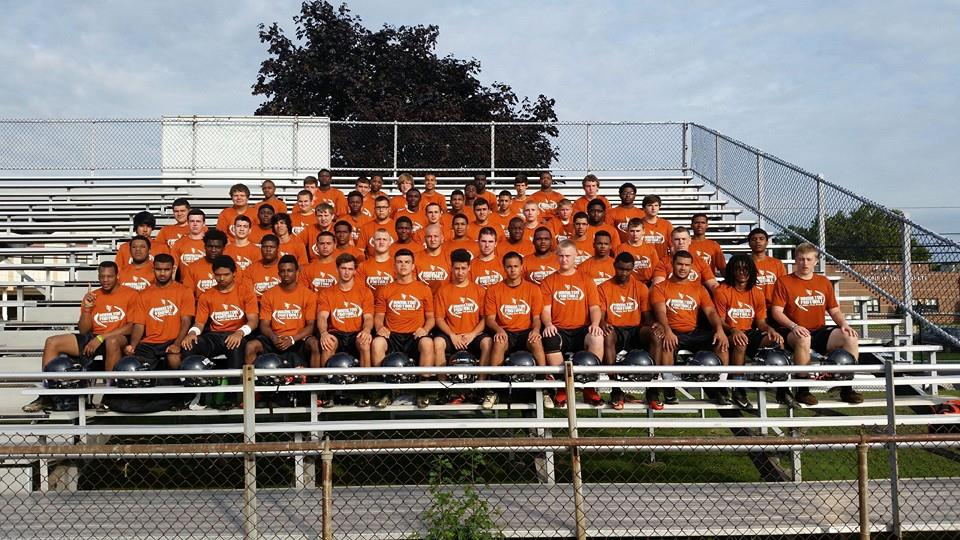
2014-2015 Hamilton West (New Jersey) Football Team, known as the Hornets

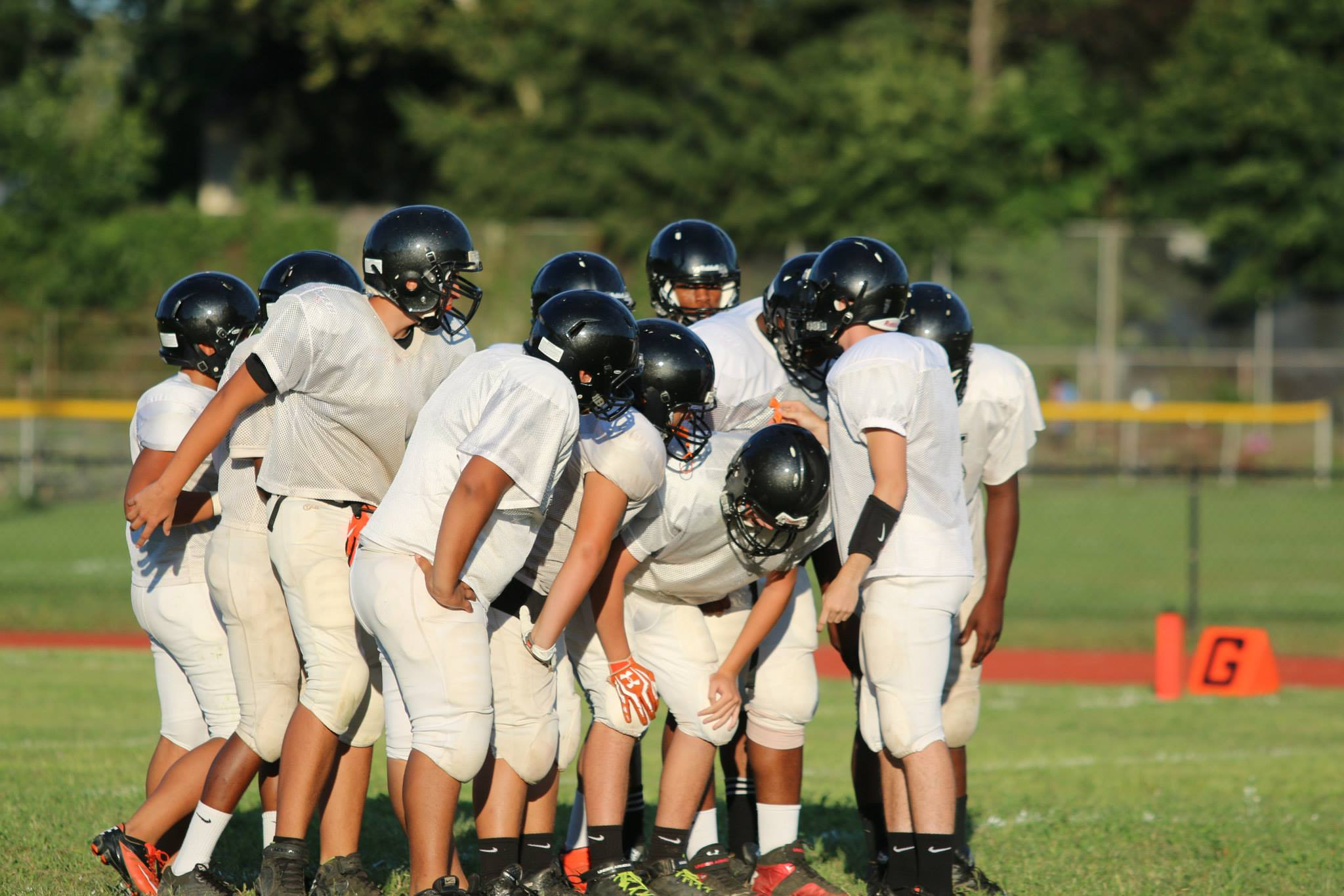
Hamilton West Hornets huddle, September 2013 in a football game vs the North Brunswick Raiders

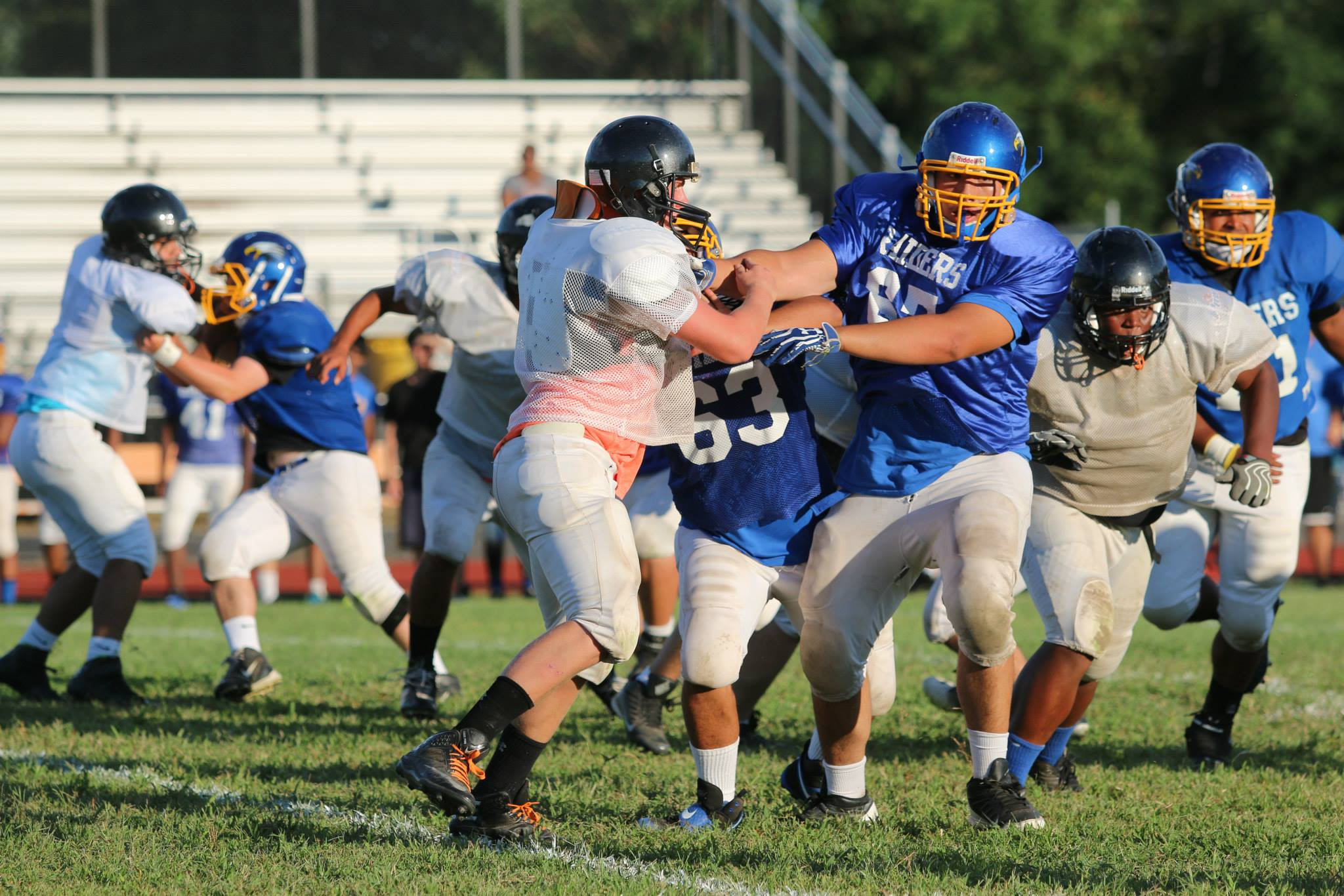
Hamilton West Hornets vs North Brunswick Raiders, football game played September 2013

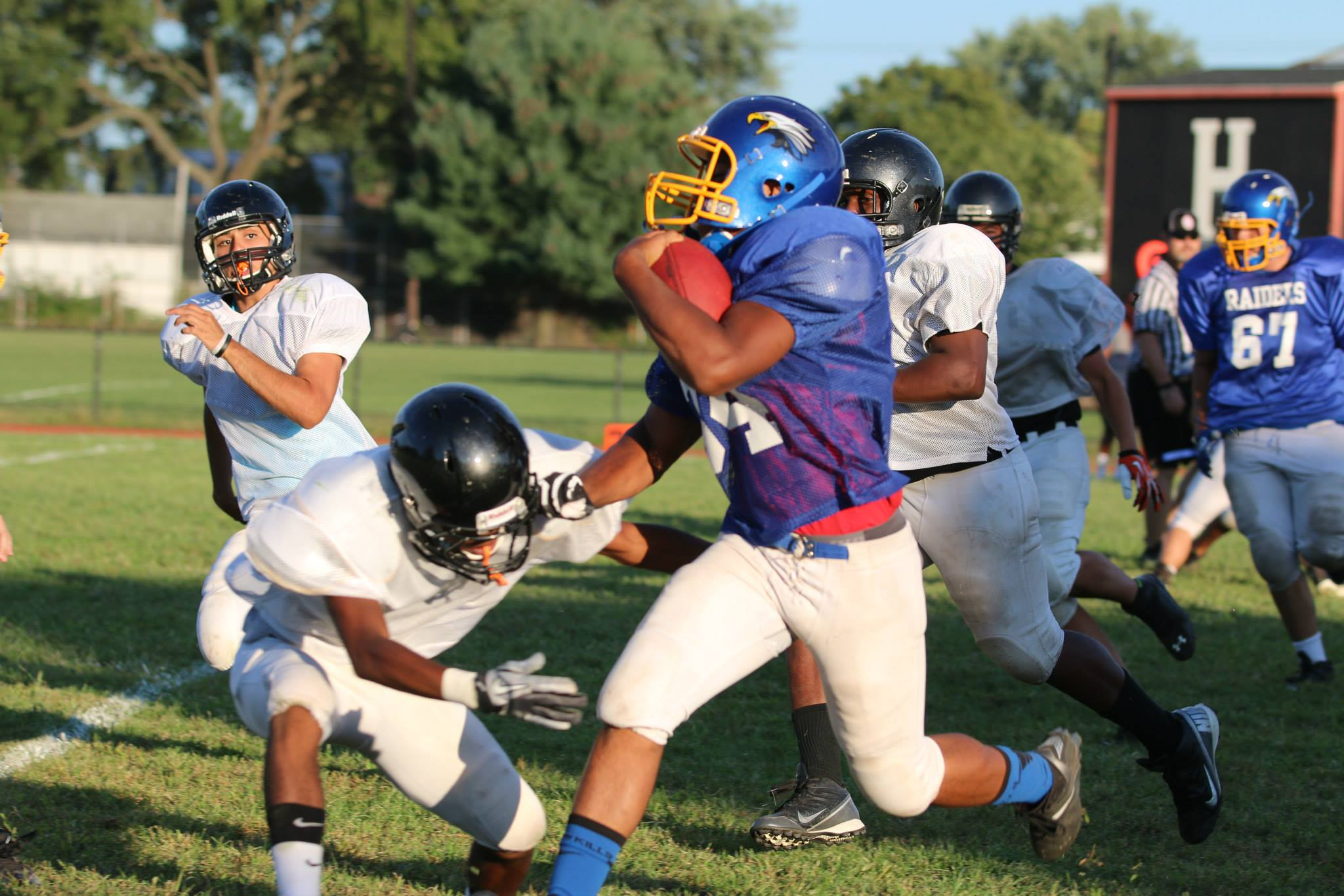
Hamilton West Hornets vs North Brunswick Raiders; running play by North Brunswick
