= Tyler Kliem =

American scholar and designer

- Born: 2002 (age 23–24); Camden, New Jersey, U.S.
- Education: University of Pennsylvania
- Years active: 2020–present

Tyler Itsik Kliem (Yiddish: טײַלער קלײַם; born 2002) is an American poet-translator, print designer, and Yiddishist.

== Early life and education ==
Kliem was born in Camden, New Jersey in 2002 and raised in Hamilton Township, New Jersey. He is Ashkenazi Jewish.

Kliem graduated in 2024 from the University of Pennsylvania, studying with Kathryn Hellerstein. After graduation, he obtained a Fulbright grant to study the Yiddish avant-garde at the Heinrich Heine University Düsseldorf.

He is a current bibliography fellow at the Yiddish Book Center.
