= Jim McKeown (soccer) =

American soccer player

Personal information
- Full name: James McKeown
- Date of birth: March 6, 1956 (age 70)
- Place of birth: Trenton, New Jersey, U.S.
- Height: 6 ft 0 in (1.83 m)
- Position: Defender

College career
Years	Team	Apps	(Gls)
1974–1977	Rider Broncs		

Senior career*
Years	Team	Apps	(Gls)
1978	Tulsa Roughnecks	16	(0)
1979	Philadelphia Fury	5	(0)
- * Club domestic league appearances and goals

James McKeown (born March 6, 1956) is an American retired soccer defender who played in the North American Soccer League for the Tulsa Roughnecks and Philadelphia Fury.

McKeown grew up in Hamilton Township, Mercer County, New Jersey and graduated from Steinert High School in 1974, where he was part of two Group IV championship soccer teams. He was inducted into the Steinart Hall of Fame in 2008. He then attended Rider University, playing on the men's soccer team from 1974 to 1977. He was inducted into the Rider University Athletics Hall of Fame in June 2016. The Tulsa Roughnecks selected him in the first round (13th overall) in the 1979 North American Soccer League draft. He spent one season with Tulsa before moving to the Philadelphia Fury for the 1979 season.

In January 1981, McKeown became a sales representative for Honeywell. Over the years, he held a variety of management positions in various companies. In August 2004, he became the President of Schlegel Electronic Materials. In August 2008, he became the Vice President of Elliot Equipment Company.
