= Almost Normal =

- DVD cover
- Directed by: Marc Moody
- Written by: Marc Moody
- Produced by: Sharon Teo
- Starring: J. Andrew Keitch; Tim Hammer; Joan Lauckner
- Cinematography: Richie Sherman
- Edited by: Marc Moody; Sharon Teo
- Music by: Jonathan Joyner
- Distributed by: Seventh Art Releasing
- Release date: May 26, 2005
- Running time: 90 minutes
- Country: United States
- Language: English

Almost Normal is a 2005 comedy-drama film directed by Marc Moody and starring J. Andrew Keitch, Tim Hammer, and Joan Lauckner.

== Plot synopsis ==
Brad Jenkins, a 40-year-old gay college professor, is still uncomfortable in his own skin. After a disagreement with his mother, he storms out of his home, claiming that he is "going somewhere where [he] is more normal." A sudden car accident propels him back to his youth and into a world in which gay is "normal" and being straight is not accepted. Brad has to weigh whether to remain in the past and be "normal" or attempt to return to his old life. A local jock, who had ignored him before, now dates him. However, he grows attracted to a girl – his best friend/sister-in-law in the heteronormative world. The couple attempts to deal with the pressures of being straight in a gay world. Eventually, everyone dances with people of the opposite sex at the school ball, even though they are in the homonormative world, showing Brad's "acceptance" of his straightness in the past and his gay self in real life. He then returns to his life as a professor and re-unites with the jock, who turns out to be the gay father of a student of Brad's.

== Cast ==
- J. Andrew Keitch as Brad Jenkins
- Joan Lauckner as Julie Erwin
- Tim Hammer as Roland Davis
- Nils Haaland as Terry
- Kehry Anson Lane as Bill Dempson
- Joel Egger as Dwayne Twillis
- Virginia Smith as Doris Jenkins
- Brad Buffum as Bob Jenkins
- Mary Douglass as Louise Baker
- Steve Balsarini as Halbert Baker
- John Brennan as Mr. Thompson
- Adam Jefferis as Steven Davis
- Katherine Nora Leroy as Yolanda
- Stan Brown as Mr. Fock
- Eric Smith as Keith Stevens
- Paige Edwards as Little Girl

== Reception ==
=== Awards ===
Almost Normal won the Best of the Fest award at the 2005 Breckenridge Festival of Film.

== See also ==
- List of American films of 2005
