= Brad Jenkins (producer) =

American producer

Brad L. Jenkins
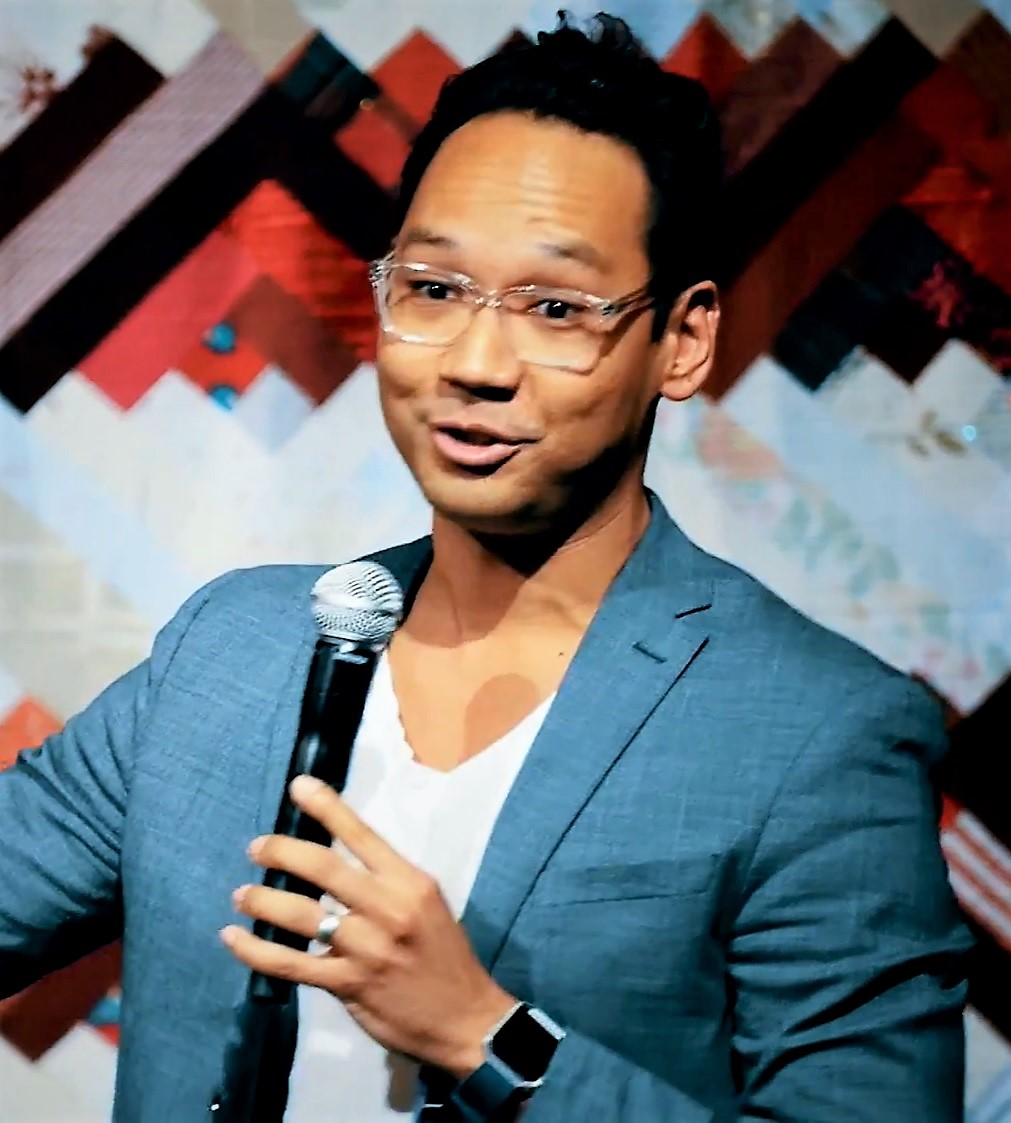
- Jenkins speaks at the 2017 Citizen University National Conference
- Education: University of Virginia
- Occupations: Executive producer, Funny or Die DC

Brad L. Jenkins is an American producer. He is the managing director and executive producer of Funny or Die DC. Jenkins is the former associate director of the White House Office of Public Engagement.

== Career ==
Born in Hamilton Township, Mercer County, New Jersey, Jenkins was a student at Steinert High School. There, he completed an advanced government course, which featured presentations by local officials and a three-day trip to Washington, D.C. These experiences fostered a deeper understanding of governmental operations and sparked a lasting interest in politics.

After graduating from the University of Virginia, Jenkins worked as an investment professional for six years in New York and San Francisco, where he worked for Farallon Capital. After moving to California, Jenkins and his wife joined a volunteer group for Barack Obama's presidential campaign in 2007 before the Democratic primaries. He later moved to Chicago and became the national deputy director of special projects for the Obama campaign.

Jenkins served as the founding vice president of Business Forward, an organization that brings entrepreneurs into the policy-making process, before signing on at the White House as associate director for the Office of Public Engagement under Valerie Jarrett. At the White House, Jenkins served as a liaison to the creative community working with executives, celebrities, artists and advocacy leaders. In his role, he also served as a liaison for the comedy video website Funny or Die and was involved in an episode of Between Two Ferns, in which Zach Galifianakis interviews President Obama about the Affordable Care Act. Several weeks after the interview aired, Jenkins and Jarrett briefed the President in the Oval Office about its widespread critical acclaim and how it was the show's "most successful video." Jenkins recounts this story in depth in West Wingers: Stories from the Dream Chasers, Change Makers, and Hope Creators Inside the Obama White House, a collection of personal stories by Obama administration staffers.

In 2015, it was announced that Jenkins would be named managing director and executive producer of Funny or Die's new Washington, D.C. branch, where he produces politically themed content and provides consulting services. In 2020, it was announced that he and Meena Harris would launch a production studio titled "Phenomenal Productions".

Jenkins runs Enfranchisement Productions whose first hour-long special, TAAF Heritage Heroes, premiered on Hulu.
