= Hamilton Township, Mercer County, New Jersey =

Township in Mercer County, New Jersey, US

Hamilton Township, New Jersey
- Township
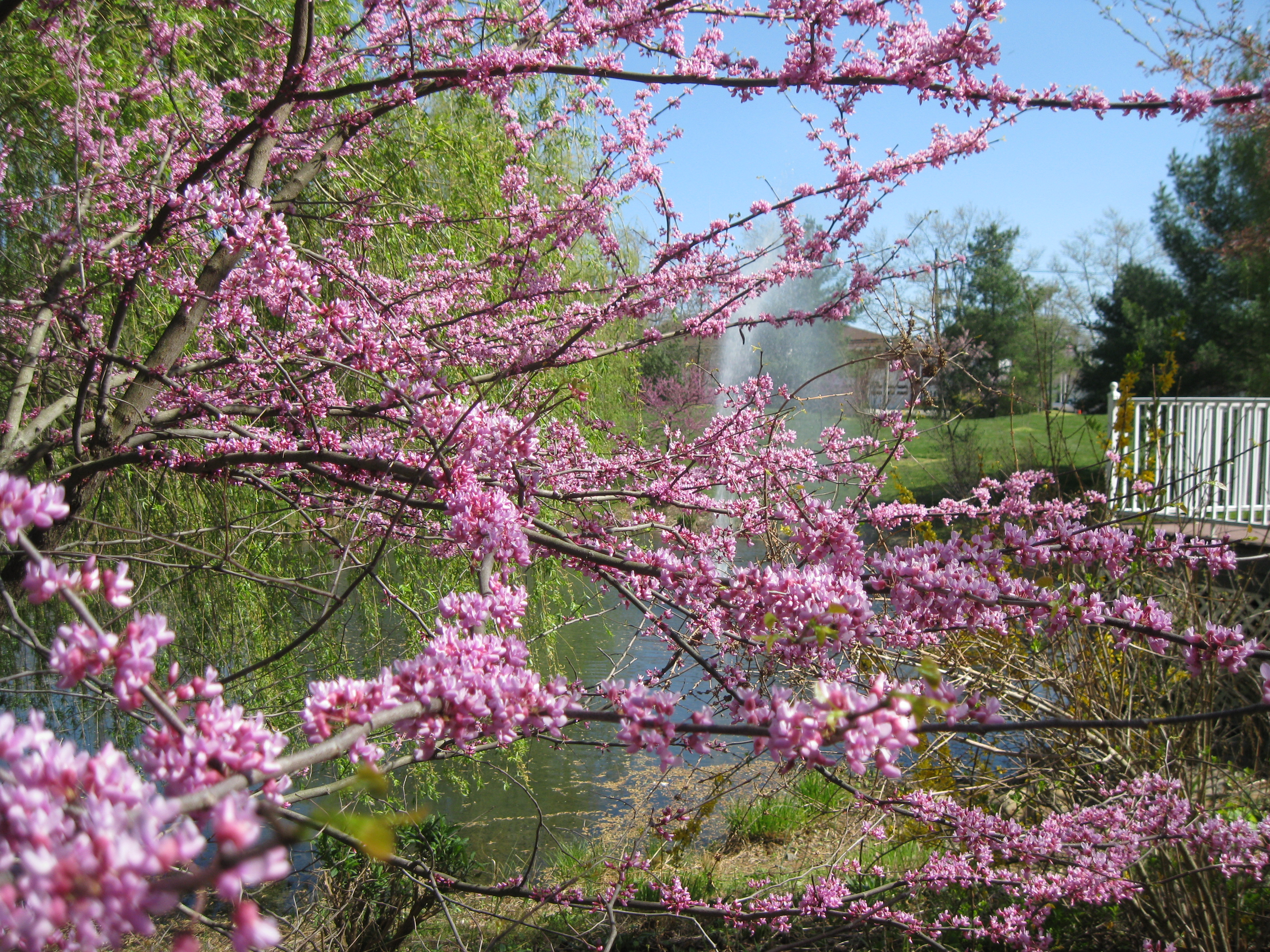
- Sayen Park Botanical Garden

- Seal
- Motto: America's Favorite Hometown
- Location of Hamilton Township in Mercer County highlighted in red (right). Inset map: Location of Mercer County in New Jersey highlighted in orange (left)

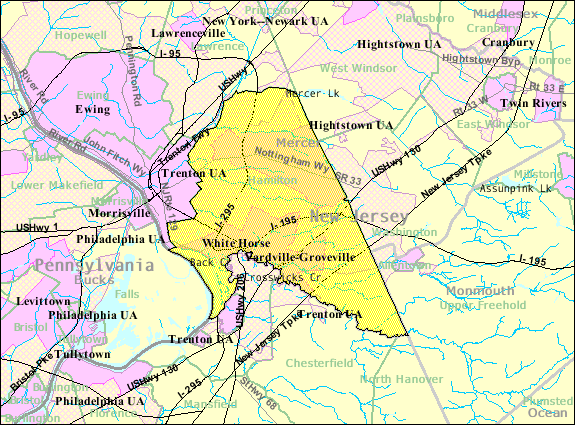
- Census Bureau map of Hamilton Township, Mercer County, New Jersey
- Interactive map of Hamilton Township, New Jersey
- Location in Mercer County Location in New Jersey Location in the United States
- Coordinates: 40.206266°N 74.675274°W
- Country: United States
- State: New Jersey
- County: Mercer
- Incorporated: April 11, 1842
- Named for: Hamilton Square / Alexander Hamilton

Government
  - Type: Faulkner Act Mayor-Council
  - Body: Township Council
  - Mayor: Jeff Martin (D)
  - Administrator: Kathryn Monzo
  - Municipal clerk: Alison Sabo

Area
  - Total: 40.31 sq mi (104.41 km^{2})
  - Land: 39.44 sq mi (102.14 km^{2})
  - Water: 0.87 sq mi (2.26 km^{2}) 2.17%
  - Rank: 55th of 565 in state 2nd of 12 in county
- Elevation: 98 ft (30 m)

Population (2020)
  - Total: 92,297
  - Estimate (2023): 91,640
  - Rank: 9th of 565 in state 1st of 12 in county
  - Density: 2,340.3/sq mi (903.6/km^{2})
  - Rank: 264th of 565 in state 6th of 12 in county
- Time zone: UTC−05:00 (Eastern (EST))
  - Summer (DST): UTC−04:00 (Eastern (EDT))
- ZIP Codes: 08609–08611, 08619, 08620, 08629, 08650, 08690, 08691
- Area codes: 609 and 640
- FIPS code: 3402129310
- GNIS feature ID: 0882127
- Website: www.hamiltonnj.com

Hamilton Township is a township and the most populous municipality in Mercer County, in the U.S. state of New Jersey. It is the largest suburb of Trenton, the state's capital, which is located to the township's west. The township is situated within the New York metropolitan area as defined by the United States Census Bureau but directly borders the Philadelphia metropolitan area and is part of the Federal Communications Commission's Philadelphia Designated Market Area. As of the 2020 United States census, the township's population was 92,297, its highest decennial count ever and an increase of 3,833 (+4.3%) from the 2010 census count of 88,464, which in turn reflected an increase of 1,355 (+1.6%) from the 2000 census count of 87,109. The township was the state's ninth-largest municipality in 2010 and 2020, after having been ranked 10th in 2000.

Hamilton was incorporated as a township by an act of the New Jersey Legislature on April 11, 1842, from portions of the now-defunct Nottingham Township. Portions of the township were taken to form Chambersburg on April 1, 1872, and annexed by Trenton in 1888, and by Wilbur on April 24, 1891, and annexed by Trenton in 1898. Hamilton Township derives its name from the village of Hamilton Square, which might have been named for Alexander Hamilton.

In 2006, Hamilton Township was ranked by Morgan Quitno Press as the 18th-safest city in the United States, out of 369 cities nationwide. In the company's 2005 survey, the Township was ranked 15th safest of 354 cities surveyed nationwide.

== Geography ==
According to the U.S. Census Bureau, the township had a total area of 40.31 square miles (104.41 km^{2}), including 39.44 square miles (102.14 km^{2}) of land and 0.87 square miles (2.26 km^{2}) of water (2.17%).

Although Hamilton is one of the largest townships in New Jersey it doesn't have a true "downtown", but a number of settlements within the township form smaller commercial centers. Groveville (with a 2020 Census population of 3,106), Hamilton Square (12,679), Mercerville (13,447), White Horse (9,791) and Yardville (6,965) are all census-designated places and unincorporated communities located within the township.

Other unincorporated communities, localities and place names located partially or completely within the township include Briar Manor, Broad Street Park, Bromley, Chewalla Park, Creston, DeCou Village, Deutzville, Duck Island, East Trenton Heights, Edgebrook, Extonville, Golden Crest, Gropps Lake, Haines Corner, Hutchinson Mills, Lakeside Park, Maple Shade, North Crosswicks, Nottingham, Oil City, Pond Run, Quaker Bridge, Quaker Gardens, Rosemont, The Orchards, Trenton Gardens, Warner Village, White City and Yardville Heights.

Van Nest Wildlife Refuge is a 98-acre (40 ha) wildlife management area operated by the New Jersey Department of Environmental Protection's Division of Fish and Wildlife.

The township borders the municipalities of Lawrence Township, Robbinsville Township, Trenton and West Windsor in Mercer County; Bordentown City, Bordentown Township, Chesterfield Township and North Hanover Township in Burlington County; Upper Freehold Township in Monmouth County; and Falls Township in Bucks County, Pennsylvania, across the Delaware River in Pennsylvania.

== Demographics ==
Historical population
Census	Pop.	Note	%±
1810	1,747		—
1820	1,710		−2.1%
1830	1,903		11.3%
1850	2,807		—
1860	3,773		34.4%
1870	5,417		43.6%
1880	3,370	*	−37.8%
1890	4,163		23.5%
1900	4,164	*	0.0%
1910	7,899		89.7%
1920	14,580		84.6%
1930	27,121		86.0%
1940	30,219		11.4%
1950	41,156		36.2%
1960	65,035		58.0%
1970	79,609		22.4%
1980	82,801		4.0%
1990	86,553		4.5%
2000	87,109		0.6%
2010	88,464		1.6%
2020	92,297		4.3%
2023 (est.)	91,640		−0.7%
Population sources: 1850-1920 1850-1870; 1850 1870 1880-1890; 1890-1910 1910-1930; 1940–2000 2000; 2010 2020 * = Lost territory in previous decade.

=== 2020 census ===
Hamilton township, Mercer County, New Jersey – Racial and ethnic composition Note: the US Census treats Hispanic/Latino as an ethnic category. This table excludes Latinos from the racial categories and assigns them to a separate category. Hispanics/Latinos may be of any race.
Race / Ethnicity (NH = Non-Hispanic)	Pop 1990	Pop 2000	Pop 2010	Pop 2020	% 1990	% 2000	% 2010	% 2020
White alone (NH)	78,331	72,118	64,530	55,199	90.50%	82.79%	72.94%	59.81%
Black or African American alone (NH)	4,279	6,907	10,042	11,724	4.94%	7.93%	11.35%	12.70%
Native American or Alaska Native alone (NH)	81	86	93	67	0.09%	0.10%	0.11%	0.07%
Asian alone (NH)	1,805	2,226	2,890	4,121	2.09%	2.56%	3.27%	4.46%
Pacific Islander alone (NH)	N/A	22	41	14	N/A	0.03%	0.05%	0.02%
Other race alone (NH)	51	104	111	348	0.06%	0.12%	0.13%	0.38%
Mixed race or Multiracial (NH)	N/A	1,175	1,144	2,545	N/A	1.35%	1.29%	2.76%
Hispanic or Latino (any race)	2,006	4,471	9,613	18,279	2.32%	5.13%	10.87%	19.80%
Total	86,553	87,109	88,464	92,297	100.00%	100.00%	100.00%	100.00%

=== 2010 census ===
The 2010 United States census counted 88,464 people, 34,534 households, and 23,759 families in the township. The population density was 2,240.2 per square mile (864.9/km^{2}). There were 36,170 housing units at an average density of 915.9 per square mile (353.6/km^{2}). The racial makeup was 78.38% (69,340) White, 11.78% (10,419) Black or African American, 0.17% (149) Native American, 3.29% (2,914) Asian, 0.09% (79) Pacific Islander, 4.27% (3,775) from other races, and 2.02% (1,788) from two or more races. Hispanic or Latino of any race were 10.87% (9,613) of the population.

Of the 34,534 households, 28.0% had children under the age of 18; 51.3% were married couples living together; 12.8% had a female householder with no husband present and 31.2% were non-families. Of all households, 26.3% were made up of individuals and 11.6% had someone living alone who was 65 years of age or older. The average household size was 2.55 and the average family size was 3.09.

21.2% of the population were under the age of 18, 8.1% from 18 to 24, 25.3% from 25 to 44, 29.6% from 45 to 64, and 15.8% who were 65 years of age or older. The median age was 41.8 years. For every 100 females, the population had 91.8 males. For every 100 females ages 18 and older there were 88.6 males.

The Census Bureau's 2006–2010 American Community Survey showed that (in 2010 inflation-adjusted dollars) median household income was $72,026 (with a margin of error of +/− $2,663) and the median family income was $87,512 (+/− $2,631). Males had a median income of $58,674 (+/− $3,519) versus $45,661 (+/− $1,733) for females. The per capita income for the township was $32,344 (+/− $701). About 3.5% of families and 5.2% of the population were below the poverty line, including 8.3% of those under age 18 and 3.3% of those age 65 or over.

=== 2000 census ===
As of the 2000 United States census there were 87,109 people, 33,523 households, and 23,667 families residing in the township. The population density was 2,208.0 inhabitants per square mile (852.5/km^{2}). There were 34,535 housing units at an average density of 875.4 per square mile (338.0/km^{2}). The racial makeup of the township was 85.15% White, 8.16% African American, 0.14% Native American, 2.56% Asian, 0.04% Pacific Islander, 2.19% from other races, and 1.76% from two or more races. Hispanic or Latino of any race were 5.13% of the population.

There were 33,523 households, out of which 31.2% had children under the age of 18 living with them, 55.3% were married couples living together, 11.5% had a female householder with no husband present, and 29.4% were non-families. 24.5% of all households were made up of individuals, and 10.8% had someone living alone who was 65 years of age or older. The average household size was 2.58 and the average family size was 3.10.

In the township the population was spread out, with 23.2% under the age of 18, 7.0% from 18 to 24, 29.9% from 25 to 44, 24.2% from 45 to 64, and 15.6% who were 65 years of age or older. The median age was 39 years. For every 100 females, there were 91.1 males. For every 100 females age 18 and over, there were 87.0 males.

The median income for a household in the township was $57,110, and the median income for a family was $66,986. Males had a median income of $46,360 versus $33,673 for females. The per capita income for the township was $25,441. About 2.8% of families and 4.2% of the population were below the poverty line, including 5.4% of those under age 18 and 5.6% of those age 65 or over.

== Economy ==
As of late 2005, much of the new residential development in Hamilton has been geared to accommodating the aging baby boomer generation. New retirement communities and assisted-living facilities outpace that of new traditional residential communities. Such construction has been spurred by several factors. The first being that the public is skeptical of growing school budgets due to its already large size. Hamilton voters have often rejected increases in school budgets in their yearly elections to keep already high taxes from growing higher. As a result, the planning board has been reluctant to authorize construction of housing that will increase the student population. Another reason is a series of improvements to Robert Wood Johnson University Hospital, Hamilton. It is situated next to where most of the under-developed land in the township used to be, land that is now home to the active older-adult communities.

As of October 2016, significant construction has been done to further build up the Hamilton Township area. Multiple new retirement communities have been constructed, as well as multiple new restaurants, banks, gas stations and convenience stores along Route 33. Hamilton Township continues to expand rapidly to accommodate the increase in citizens residing in the community.

== Parks and recreation ==
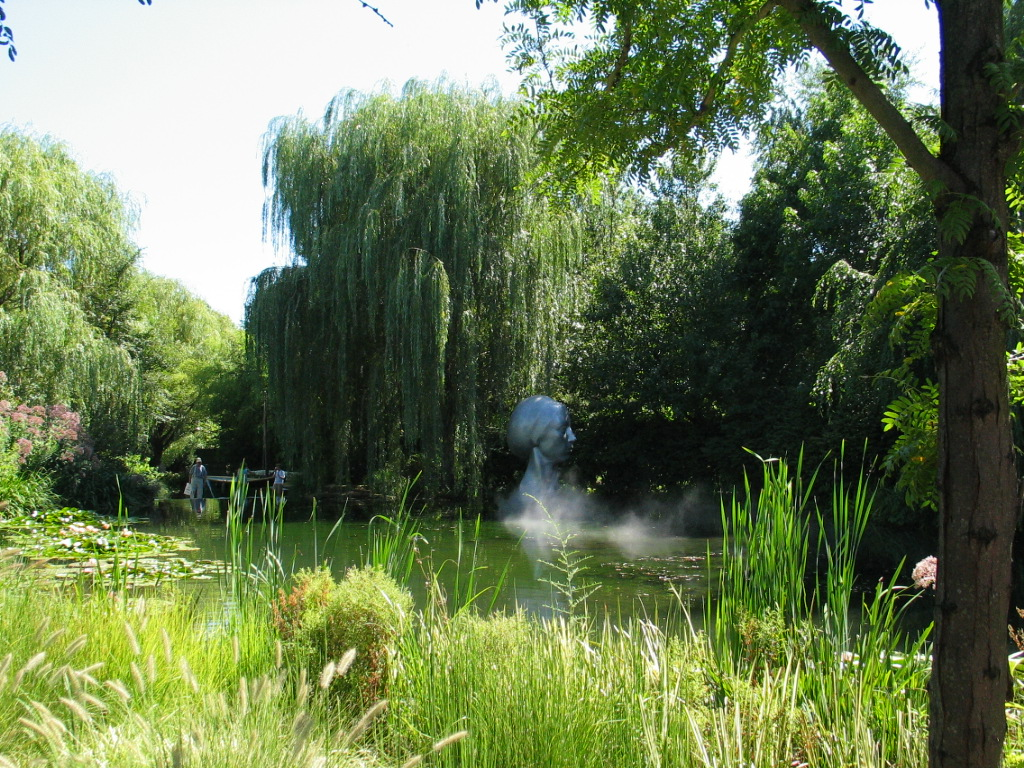
Grounds For Sculpture, located in Hamilton Township

Hamilton hosts one of the largest recreational parks in the state, and borders another. The municipal Veterans Park is 350 acres (1.4 km^{2}) and is housed entirely in the township. Mercer County Park borders the township to the North and encompasses 2,500 acres (10 km^{2}) of land that was shared from Hamilton Township along with neighboring Lawrence Township and West Windsor. The park contains Mercer Lake, one of the largest man-made lakes in the state, which was built as a result of a federal flood control project to prevent flooding in Trenton along Assunpink Creek, with gravel removed to deepen the lake basin used as part of the construction of Interstates 295 and 195.

The Grounds for Sculpture is a 42-acre (170,000 m^{2}) sculpture park which houses more than 270 sculptures, gardens, water features, and other nature scenes. The organization's mission is to promote the appreciation of arts and sculpture.

Sayen Park Botanical Garden is named after Fredrick Sayen because it was originally his land and his home.

George Washington used Quakerbridge Road on his famous night march from the Second Battle of Trenton on his way to the Battle of Princeton.

== Festivals and events ==
Hamilton Township hosts 6 events total per year, The St. Patrick's Day parade, is hosted in the Hamilton-Square-Sayen area during sometime in March. Then, the Memorial Day parade is hosted during Memorial Day, sharing the route of the St. Patrick's day parade. Later that month, is the azalea festival hosted around mothers day in Sayen House & Gardens. In July, the town hosts a fireworks show usually on the 3rd or 2nd. In october, is the largest festival in Hamilton, Oktoberfest. It is hosted at Veterans Park South, and contains Food from local restaurants, Activities, Arts, Crafts, and Live Music. It is hosted in mid-october. In December, comes Winter Wonderland, hosted in Kuser Park & Mansion. Containing lights, decor, and a christmas theme.

== Historic places ==
- The Isaac Watson House was built in 1708 on a bluff overlooking Watson's Creek near the present-day community of White Horse; the property totaled 800 acres (3.2 km^{2}). Located at 151 Westcott Avenue, it is the oldest house in Mercer County. The house serves as the headquarters of the New Jersey State Society DAR. The house is on the National Register of Historic Places (NRHP).
- The John Abbott II House was built in 1730 by John Abbott. It is located at 2200 Kuser Road a mile south of Mercerville near Veterans Park. The house is noted as having been used as a secret repository for funds hidden from British as they advanced on Trenton in 1776. The funds were stored by John Abbott II for state treasurer Samuel Tucker inside a tub containing broken crockery. In 1969 the house was to be razed to the ground but was saved by the Hamilton Township Historical Society. The house is listed on the National Register.
- The Isaac Pearson House was built in 1733. Isaac Pearson was elected several times to the state assembly, served on the General Committee of Correspondence appointed by the Provincial Assembly on July 21, 1774, and the first Committee of Safety in October 1775. Pearson was killed by robbers, or was suspected as having collaborated with the British and killed by Continentals. Located in White Horse in the southern part of the township, the house is listed on the New Jersey Register of Historic Places.

== Government ==
=== Local government ===
Hamilton Township has been governed under the Faulkner Act Mayor-Council system of New Jersey municipal government since January 1, 1976, based on the recommendations of a Charter Study Commission. The township is one of 71 municipalities (of the 564) statewide governed under this form. The township's government is comprised of the Mayor and the five-member Township Council, with all elected representatives chosen at-large on a partisan basis as part of the November general election in odd-numbered years and serving four-year terms of office. Elections alternate in a four-year cycle, with the mayor and two township council members up for election and then the three other township council seats coming up for vote two years later. At an annual reorganization meeting, the council selects a president and vice president from among its members for a one-year term.

As of 2025, the Mayor of Hamilton Township is Democrat Jeffrey S. Martin, serving a term of office that ends December 31, 2027. Members of the Township Council are Council President Richard L. Tighe (D, 2025), Council Vice President Pasquale "Pat" Papero Jr. (D, 2027), Anthony P. Carabelli Jr. (D, 2025), Nancy Phillips (D, 2027) and Charles F. "Chuddy" Whalen III (D, 2025).

In January 2020, the Township Council chose Charles Whalen from a list of three candidates nominated by the Democratic municipal committee to fill the seat expiring in December 2021 that had been held by Jeffrey Martin until he stepped down to take office as mayor. Whalen served on an interim basis until the November 2020 general election, when he was chosen to serve the balance of the term of office.

==== Emergency services ====
Starting in January 2021, fire protection is provided by a consolidated professional fire department, which replaced eight separate fire districts each of which served a separate of the township and had its own tax assessments. The new combined department operates on an annual budget of $28 million, with 135 firefighters in four engine companies, two ladder companies and two squad companies.

Emergency medical services are provided by Robert Wood Johnson University Hospital, following the closure of the Nottingham Volunteer Ambulance Squad in December 2025.

==== Mayoral history ====
Mayors of Hamilton Township, Mercer County
#	Mayor	Term	Party
1	John K. "Jack" Rafferty	1976–2000	Republican
2	Glen Gilmore	2000–2008	Democratic
3	John Bencivengo	2008–2012	Republican
	Kevin Meara (acting)	2012	Republican
4	Kelly Yaede	2012–2020	Republican
5	Jeff Martin	2020–present	Democratic

On April 27, 2012, Mayor John Bencivengo was charged by the U.S. Attorney's office for corruption in the extortion of payments in exchange for influencing the awarding of a health insurance contract for the Township's Board of Education. On June 22, 2012 he was indicted by a federal grand jury on five criminal counts including extortion, attempted extortion, money laundering and two counts related to the federal travel act.

On June 29, 2012, Rob Warney, a former Hamilton Township Director in Mayor John Bencivengo's cabinet, pleaded guilty before US District Court Judge Peter Sheridan to laundering money related to the federal bribery indictment against Mayor Bencivengo. Warney also admitted to accepting a bribe in 2006 in exchange for his vote and influence over a health insurance broker's contract.

On November 19, 2012, Bencivengo was found guilty on all counts of corruption, extortion and bribery. He submitted his resignation effective November 21, 2012. Councilman Kevin J. Meara was sworn in as Acting Mayor, replacing Bencivengo following his resignation. On March 24, 2013, Bencivengo was sentenced to a 38-month prison term, which he served at a minimum security federal prison at Lewisburg Federal Penitentiary in Lewisburg, Pennsylvania. On September 23, 2013, his attorney filed an appeal with the United States Court of Appeals for the Third Circuit, which was denied in April 2014. He was released to a half-way house in December 2014, and completed his sentence while under house arrest in June 2015.

=== Federal, state, and county representation ===
Hamilton Township is part of New Jersey's 3rd congressional district and 14th state legislative district.

For the 119th United States Congress, New Jersey's 3rd congressional district is currently represented Herb Conaway (D, Delran Township). New Jersey is represented in the United States Senate by Democrats Cory Booker (Newark, term ends 2027) and Andy Kim (Moorestown, term ends 2031).

For the 2026–2027 session, the 14th legislative district of the New Jersey Legislature is represented in the State Senate by Linda R. Greenstein (D, Plainsboro Township) and in the General Assembly by Wayne DeAngelo (D, Hamilton Township) and Tennille McCoy (D, Hamilton Township).

Mercer County is governed by a County Executive who oversees the day-to-day operations of the county and by a seven-member Board of County Commissioners that acts in a legislative capacity, setting policy. All officials are chosen at-large in partisan elections, with the executive serving a four-year term of office while the commissioners serve three-year terms of office on a staggered basis, with either two or three seats up for election each year as part of the November general election. As of 2025, the County Executive is Daniel R. Benson (D, Hamilton Township) whose term of office ends December 31, 2027. Mercer County's Commissioners are:

Lucylle R. S. Walter (D, Ewing Township, 2026), Chair John A. Cimino (D, Hamilton Township, 2026), Samuel T. Frisby Sr. (D, Trenton, 2027), Cathleen M. Lewis (D, Lawrence Township, 2025), Vice Chair Kristin L. McLaughlin (D, Hopewell Township, 2027), Nina D. Melker (D, Hamilton Township, 2025) and Terrance Stokes (D, Ewing Township, 2027).

Mercer County's constitutional officers are: Clerk Paula Sollami-Covello (D, Lawrence Township, 2025), Sheriff John A. Kemler (D, Hamilton Township, 2026) and Surrogate Diane Gerofsky (D, Lawrence Township, 2026).

=== Politics ===
Hamilton Township has historically been considered a bellwether for state and national political trends. In 2009, Republican candidate for governor Chris Christie made both his first and last campaign stops at the Golden Dawn diner in Hamilton and held a question-and-answer session at Steinert High School after his victory. In 2024, a Hamilton Township voter was photographed topless on Election Day, after she was asked to remove or cover a pro-Donald Trump shirt and hat at her polling station. The incident went viral on social media, and vice presidential candidate JD Vance shared the photograph with the caption, "What a patriot." As of March 2011, there were a total of 56,202 registered voters in Hamilton Township, of which 18,266 (32.5%) were registered as Democrats, 10,402 (18.5%) were registered as Republicans and 27,508 (48.9%) were registered as Unaffiliated. There were 26 voters registered to other parties.

United States presidential election results for Hamilton Township
Year	Republican		Democratic		Third party(ies)	
Year	No.	%	No.	%	No.	%
2024	21,179	46.23%	23,865	52.09%	768	1.68%
2020	21,584	43.92%	26,875	54.69%	680	1.38%
2016	19,396	45.49%	21,608	50.68%	1,633	3.83%
2012	17,114	41.68%	23,434	57.08%	510	1.24%
2008	19,422	44.38%	23,658	54.06%	679	1.55%
2004	20,637	49.27%	20,874	49.83%	376	0.90%

In the 2012 presidential election, Democrat Barack Obama received 57.1% of the vote (23,434 cast), ahead of Republican Mitt Romney with 41.7% (17,114 votes), and other candidates with 1.2% (510 votes), among the 44,558 ballots cast by the township's 58,973 registered voters (3,500 ballots were spoiled), for a turnout of 75.6%. In the 2008 presidential election, Democrat Barack Obama received 53.5% of the vote here (23,658 cast), ahead of Republican John McCain with 43.9% (19,422 votes) and other candidates with 1.5% (679 votes), among the 44,201 ballots cast by the township's 58,979 registered voters, for a turnout of 74.9%.

Gubernatorial election results for Hamilton Township
Year	Republican		Democratic		Third party(ies)	
Year	No.	%	No.	%	No.	%
2025	14,899	41.11%	21,148	58.36%	193	0.53%
2021	14,482	48.88%	14,905	50.31%	239	0.81%
2017	11,996	46.56%	13,180	51.15%	590	2.29%
2013	17,434	61.98%	10,217	36.32%	478	1.70%
2009	14,234	47.96%	13,490	45.46%	1,953	6.58%
2005	14,235	48.45%	13,990	47.62%	1,154	3.93%

In the 2013 gubernatorial election, Republican Chris Christie received 62.0% of the vote (17,434 cast), ahead of Democrat Barbara Buono with 36.3% (10,217 votes), and other candidates with 1.7% (478 votes), among the 29,111 ballots cast by the township's 57,809 registered voters (982 ballots were spoiled), for a turnout of 50.4%. In the 2009 gubernatorial election, Republican Chris Christie received 47.4% of the vote here (14,234 ballots cast), ahead of Democrat Jon Corzine with 45.0% (13,490 votes), Independent Chris Daggett with 5.4% (1,629 votes) and other candidates with 1.1% (324 votes), among the 29,999 ballots cast by the township's 57,543 registered voters, yielding a 52.1% turnout.

United States Senate election results for Hamilton Township1
Year	Republican		Democratic		Third party(ies)	
Year	No.	%	No.	%	No.	%
2024	18,596	42.42%	24,274	55.37%	966	2.20%
2018	13,638	46.49%	14,431	49.19%	1,268	4.32%
2012	15,382	40.10%	22,111	57.64%	865	2.26%
2006	12,527	48.06%	12,639	48.49%	899	3.45%

United States Senate election results for Hamilton Township2
Year	Republican		Democratic		Third party(ies)	
Year	No.	%	No.	%	No.	%
2020	20,812	43.75%	25,920	54.49%	837	1.76%
2014	9,369	45.23%	10,830	52.28%	516	2.49%
2013	6,961	46.62%	7,281	48.77%	688	4.61%
2008	18,895	46.95%	20,594	51.17%	755	1.88%

== Education ==
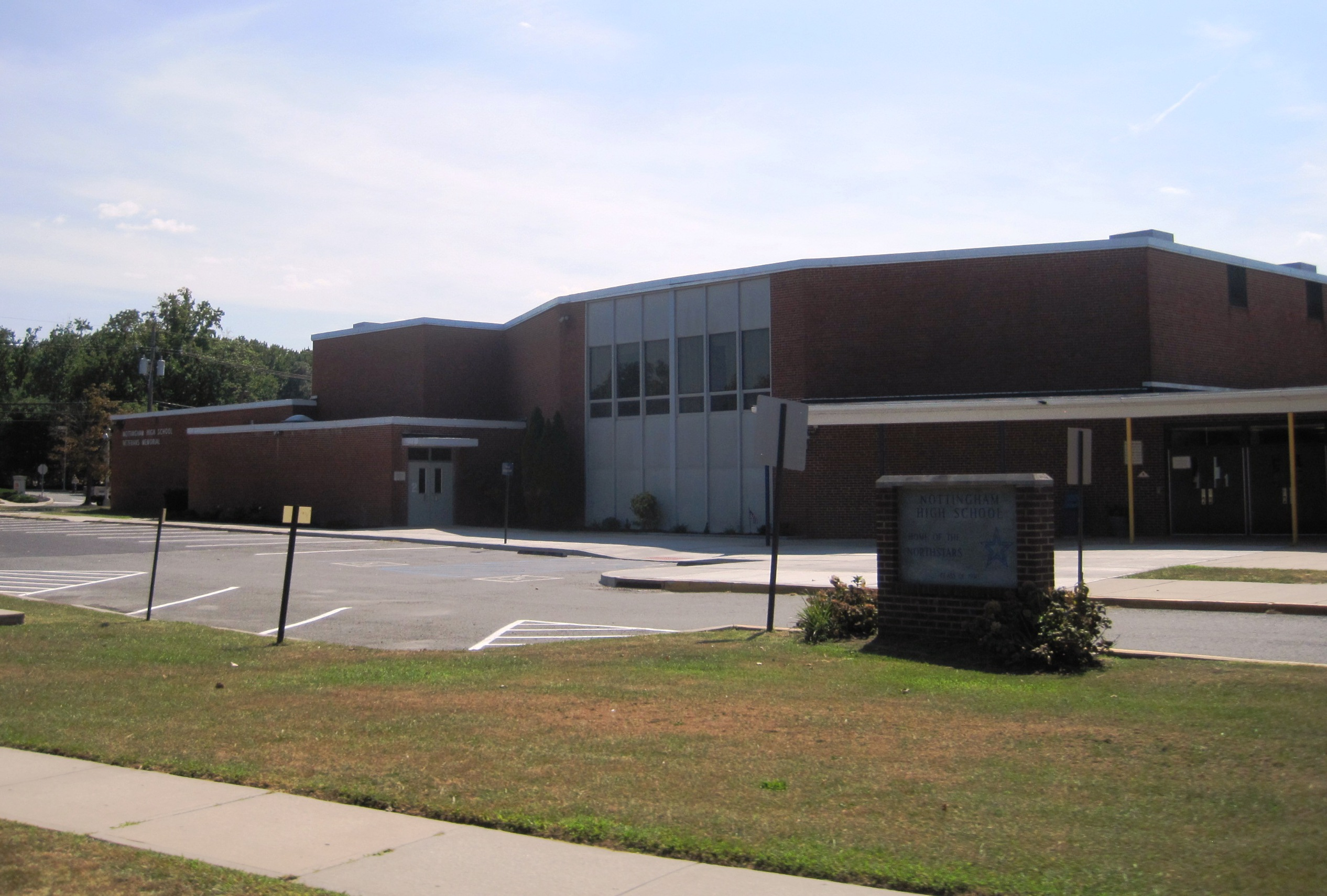
Nottingham High School

The Hamilton Township School District serve students in pre-kindergarten through twelfth grade. The district is one of the state's ten largest and consists of 17 elementary schools, three middle schools and three high schools along with an alternative program. As of the 2021–22 school year, the district, comprised of 23 schools, had an enrollment of 11,816 students and 969.4 classroom teachers (on an FTE basis), for a student–teacher ratio of 12.2:1. Schools in the district (with 2021–22 enrollment data from the National Center for Education Statistics) are Alexander Elementary School (with 351 students; in grades K-5), Greenwood Elementary School (236; K-5), Kisthardt Elementary School (231; K-5), Klockner Elementary School (234; PreK-5), Kuser Elementary School (398; PreK-5), Lalor Elementary School (317; K-5), Langtree Elementary School (393; PreK-5), McGalliard Elementary School (250; K-5), Mercerville Elementary School (328; K-5), Morgan Elementary School (276; K-5), Robinson Elementary School (401; K-5), Sayen Elementary School (260; K-5), Sunnybrae Elementary School (275; K-5), University Heights Elementary School (336; PreK-5), George E. Wilson Elementary School (418; PreK-5), Yardville Elementary School (302; PreK-5), Yardville Heights Elementary School (261; K-5), Richard C. Crockett Middle School (999; 6-8), Albert E. Grice Middle School (941; 6-8), Emily C. Reynolds Middle School (914; 6-8), Nottingham High School (North) (985; 9-12), Hamilton High School West (1,447; 9-12), Steinert High School (East) (1,280; 9-12) and Hamilton Educational Program (HEP) High School (NA; 9-12).

Pace Charter School of Hamilton is a charter school serving students in Kindergarten through fifth grade, operating under a charter granted by the New Jersey Department of Education. The school was one of 11 in the state to be recognized in 2014 by the United States Department of Education's National Blue Ribbon Schools Program.

Eighth grade students from all of Mercer County are eligible to apply to attend the high school programs offered by the Mercer County Technical Schools, a county-wide vocational school district that offers full-time career and technical education at its Health Sciences Academy, STEM Academy and Academy of Culinary Arts, with no tuition charged to students for attendance.

St. Gregory the Great Academy is a Catholic school serving students in preschool through eighth grade that operates under the auspices of the Roman Catholic Diocese of Trenton. The school was also recognized in 2014 by the National Blue Ribbon Schools Program.

== Transportation ==
=== Roads and highways ===
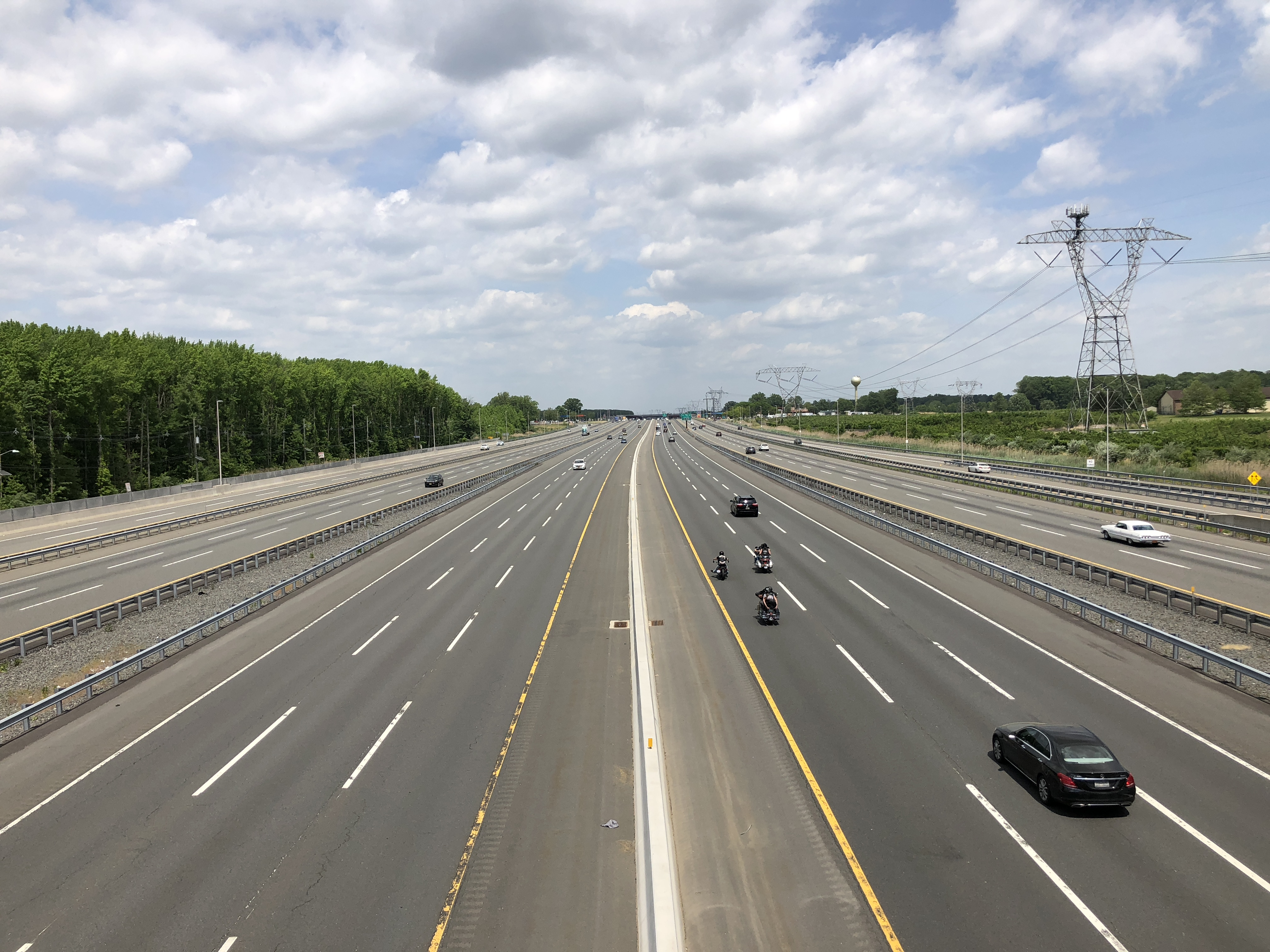
The New Jersey Turnpike (Interstate 95) is the largest and busiest highway in Hamilton, though it has no interchanges within the township

Situated next to the New Jersey state capital of Trenton, and New Jersey's eighth-largest municipality, Hamilton Township is 65 miles (105 km) away from New York City and 35 miles (56 km) away from Philadelphia. Hamilton is also close to most points along the Jersey Shore. By car, Hamilton is about 80 minutes from New York City and 50 minutes from Philadelphia. The train ride to New York is slightly shorter than the drive into New York while the train ride to Philadelphia is slightly longer than the drive into Philadelphia. With nearly 90,000 residents and 40 square miles (100 km^{2}) of land, it offers modern train station and major roads passing through.

As of May 2010, the township had a total of 369.10 miles (594.01 km) of roadways, of which 304.98 miles (490.82 km) were maintained by the municipality, 33.49 miles (53.90 km) by Mercer County and 27.93 miles (44.95 km) by the New Jersey Department of Transportation and 2.70 miles (4.35 km) by the New Jersey Turnpike Authority.

Several major roads and highways traverse the township. These include the New Jersey Turnpike (Interstate 95), Interstate 295, Interstate 195, U.S. Route 130, U.S. Route 206, Route 29, Route 33 and Route 156. Hamilton is the only municipality in the state that hosts Interstate 95 and both of its auxiliary routes, Interstates 195 and 295.

Major county routes that traverse through include CR 524, CR 533 and CR 535.

The Turnpike's Woodrow Wilson service area is located between Interchanges 7 and 7A northbound at milepost 58.7. The Richard Stockton service area is located between Interchanges 7A and 7 southbound at milepost 58.7. No turnpike interchange is located in the township, but the closest exit is at Interchange 7A along I-195 in neighboring Robbinsville Township.

The New Jersey Turnpike Authority widened the turnpike between Exit 6 in Mansfield Township, Burlington County and Exit 8A in Monroe Township, Middlesex County. Two new carriageways were built to accommodate the outer roadway (or truck lanes). In Hamilton, new sound barriers and overpasses were built, as well as new entrance & exit ramps to the service areas. The project was announced in December 2004 and completed in early November 2014.

=== Public transportation ===
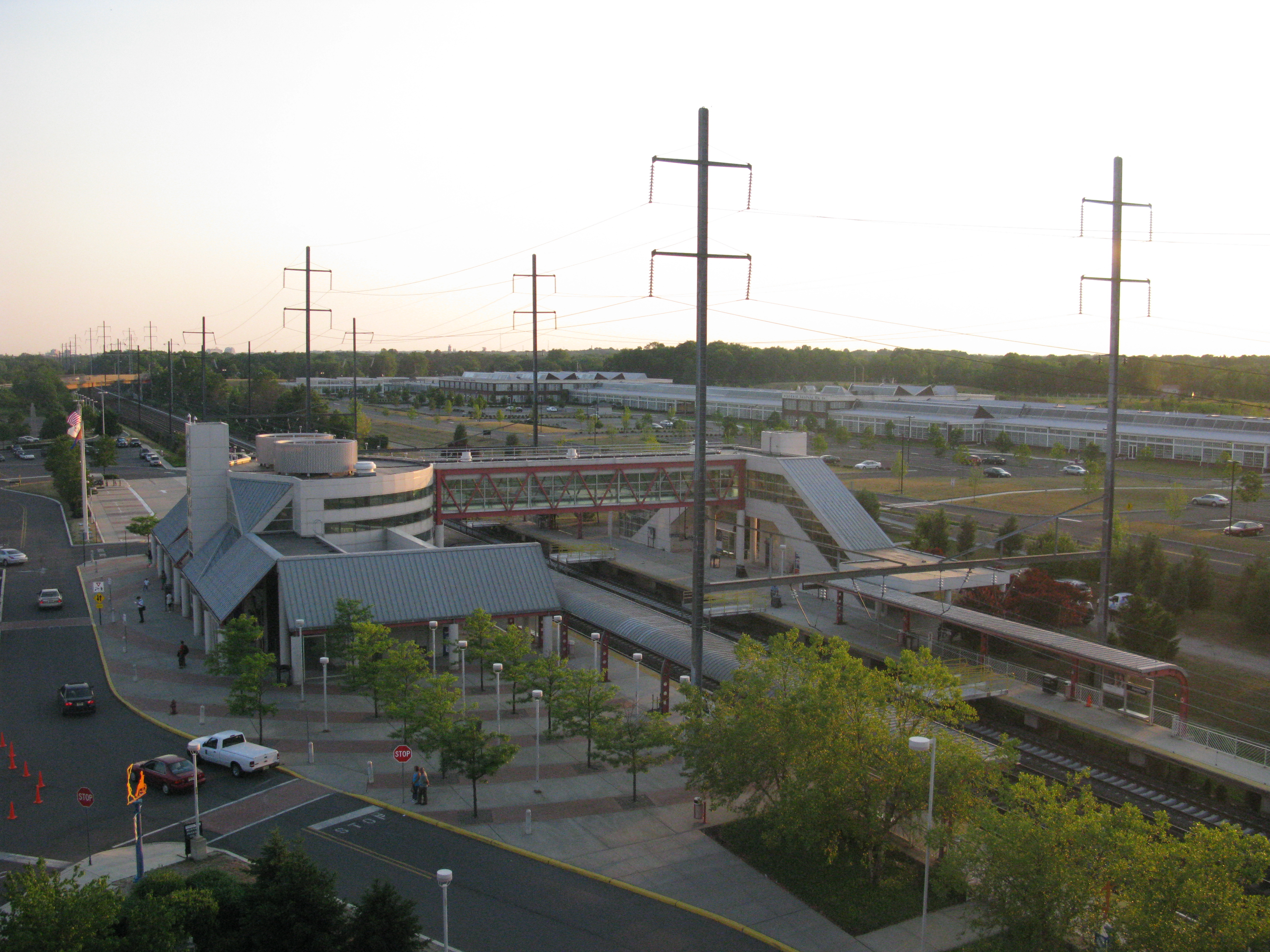
Hamilton, NJ station

With the addition in 1999 of the Hamilton train station located on Sloan Avenue just off Interstate 295 at Exit 65B, the township has attracted more New York City-based commuters to the area. The station offers service on NJ Transit's Northeast Corridor Line to Newark Penn Station, Secaucus Junction and New York Penn Station in Midtown Manhattan and to Trenton station where the SEPTA Trenton Line Regional Rail line provides service to and from Philadelphia. The station had 3,635 average weekday boardings in 2025, the eighth-highest of any NJ Transit station in the state.

NJ Transit provides public bus service between the township and Philadelphia on the 409 route and to Trenton on the 601, 603, 606, 607, 608 and 609 routes.

The Greater Mercer Transportation Management Association offers service between Hamilton and Matrix Business Park on the ZLine route to the Amazon sorting center in Robbinsville Township on the ZLine2; and on the Route 130 Connection between the Trenton Transit Center and South Brunswick.

OurBus offers intercity bus service from Hamilton to New York City, Washington, D.C., and intermediate destinations.

== In the news ==
- The Megan Kanka case, for whom Megan's Law was named, occurred in Hamilton Township in 1994.
- Some letters involved in the 2001 anthrax attacks were processed through the United States Postal Service Regional Mail Facility in Hamilton Township. The building was closed for more than four years while it was decontaminated at a cost of $65 million, but an improvised post office was made from tents and canopies in the building's vicinity.
- The annual Rockefeller Center Christmas Tree chosen for 2008 was grown in Hamilton. It was a 77-year-old Norway Spruce weighing 8 tons and rising 72 feet (22 m) that was located off the side of Klockner Road at the Tree King Tree Mart.

== Climate ==
According to the Köppen climate classification system, Hamilton Township has a Humid subtropical climate (Dfb).

Climate data for Hamilton Twp (40.2046, -74.6764), 1991-2020 normals, extremes 1981-2025
Month	Jan	Feb	Mar	Apr	May	Jun	Jul	Aug	Sep	Oct	Nov	Dec	Year
Record high °F (°C)	71.8 (22.1)	77.5 (25.3)	88.0 (31.1)	95.7 (35.4)	95.5 (35.3)	100.5 (38.1)	102.6 (39.2)	101.2 (38.4)	97.9 (36.6)	93.7 (34.3)	82.1 (27.8)	75.2 (24.0)	102.6 (39.2)
Mean daily maximum °F (°C)	40.5 (4.7)	43.1 (6.2)	50.8 (10.4)	63.1 (17.3)	72.5 (22.5)	81.8 (27.7)	86.4 (30.2)	84.6 (29.2)	78.1 (25.6)	66.3 (19.1)	55.6 (13.1)	45.6 (7.6)	64.1 (17.8)
Daily mean °F (°C)	32.1 (0.1)	34.1 (1.2)	41.5 (5.3)	52.5 (11.4)	62.1 (16.7)	71.3 (21.8)	76.3 (24.6)	74.5 (23.6)	67.8 (19.9)	56.0 (13.3)	45.7 (7.6)	37.2 (2.9)	54.4 (12.4)
Mean daily minimum °F (°C)	23.7 (−4.6)	25.1 (−3.8)	32.1 (0.1)	42.0 (5.6)	51.6 (10.9)	60.8 (16.0)	66.2 (19.0)	64.4 (18.0)	57.5 (14.2)	45.8 (7.7)	35.9 (2.2)	28.9 (−1.7)	44.6 (7.0)
Record low °F (°C)	−9.7 (−23.2)	−1.7 (−18.7)	5.2 (−14.9)	18.1 (−7.7)	32.9 (0.5)	41.9 (5.5)	48.5 (9.2)	42.4 (5.8)	34.6 (1.4)	24.5 (−4.2)	11.1 (−11.6)	0.4 (−17.6)	−9.7 (−23.2)
Average precipitation inches (mm)	3.55 (90)	2.66 (68)	4.29 (109)	3.63 (92)	3.96 (101)	4.38 (111)	4.88 (124)	4.47 (114)	4.11 (104)	4.04 (103)	3.28 (83)	4.29 (109)	47.54 (1,208)
Average snowfall inches (cm)	7.7 (20)	8.2 (21)	3.7 (9.4)	0.1 (0.25)	0.0 (0.0)	0.0 (0.0)	0.0 (0.0)	0.0 (0.0)	0.0 (0.0)	0.1 (0.25)	0.6 (1.5)	3.6 (9.1)	23.9 (61)
Average dew point °F (°C)	21.9 (−5.6)	22.5 (−5.3)	28.2 (−2.1)	37.6 (3.1)	49.4 (9.7)	59.5 (15.3)	64.5 (18.1)	63.7 (17.6)	57.9 (14.4)	46.3 (7.9)	35.2 (1.8)	27.6 (−2.4)	43.0 (6.1)
Source 1: PRISM
Source 2: NOHRSC (Snow, 2008/2009 - 2024/2025 normals)

=== Ecology ===
According to the A. W. Kuchler U.S. potential natural vegetation types, Hamilton Township would have a dominant vegetation type of Appalachian Oak (104) with a dominant vegetation form of Eastern Hardwood Forest (25).

== Notable people ==
People who were born in, residents of, or otherwise closely associated with Hamilton Township include:

- Rich Alercio (born 1965), college football coach who was head coach of the Castleton Spartans football team
- Samuel Alito (born 1950), Associate Justice of the Supreme Court of the United States
- Josiah T. Allinson (1858–1937), farmer, banker and politician who served in the New Jersey General Assembly from 1916 to 1918
- Jake Alu (born 1997), former professional baseball infielder who played for the Washington Nationals
- Bill Baroni (born 1971), former Deputy Executive Director of the Port Authority of New York and New Jersey, State Senator, and Assemblyman
- Daniel R. Benson (born 1975), Mercer County Executive and former member of the New Jersey General Assembly and the Hamilton Township Council
- David Bird (c. 1959–2014), journalist who covered energy markets for The Wall Street Journal
- Joseph L. Bocchini Jr. (born 1944), politician who served in the New Jersey General Assembly from the 14th Legislative District from 1982 to 1988
- Erin Bowman (born 1990), pop singer-songwriter
- Christian Burns (born 1985), professional basketball player for Germani Basket Brescia of the Italian Lega Basket Serie A
- Michael Cristofer (born 1945), actor, playwright and filmmaker who received the Pulitzer Prize for Drama and the Tony Award for Best Play for The Shadow Box in 1977
- Conrad Daniels (born 1941), professional darts player who was active in the 1970s and 1980s
- Wayne DeAngelo (born 1965), member of the New Jersey General Assembly and former Hamilton Township Councilman
- Jayson DiManche (born 1990), outside linebacker for the Cincinnati Bengals in the National Football League
- Dan Donigan (born 1967), retired soccer forward and current head coach of Rutgers University Men's Soccer team
- Colin Ferrell (born 1984), defensive tackle for the Indianapolis Colts, who played collegiate football at Kent State University
- Dave Gallagher (born 1960), former MLB outfielder
- Eddie Gaven (born 1986), soccer player who plays for the Columbus Crew of Major League Soccer
- Lisa Gmitter-Pittaro (born 1965), former soccer player who played as a forward, making twelve appearances for the United States women's national team
- Tom Goodwin (born 1951), politician who served briefly in the New Jersey Senate representing the 14th Legislative District from March to November 2010
- Gary Guear (born 1951), politician who served in the New Jersey General Assembly from 2000–2004, where he represented the 14th Legislative District
- Eric Hamilton (born 1953), retired American football coach who was head football coach at The College of New Jersey from 1977 through 2012, where he had a record of 212–144–6
- Janice Harsanyi (1930–2007), soprano singer and college professor
- Alejandro Hernandez, actor who has appeared in New Amsterdam and The Horror of Dolores Roach
- Peter Inverso (born 1938), former member of the New Jersey Senate
- Brad Jenkins, producer who is the managing director and executive producer of Funny or Die DC and is the former associate director of the White House Office of Public Engagement
- Dahntay Jones (born 1980), former professional basketball player, current assistant coach for the Los Angeles Clippers
- Tyler Kliem (born 2002), Yiddishist, translator and researcher
- Tad Kornegay (born 1982) defensive back for the Saskatchewan Roughriders in the Canadian Football League
- Paul Kramer (1933–2020), member of the New Jersey General Assembly
- Jim McKeown (born 1956), defender who played in the North American Soccer League for the Tulsa Roughnecks and Philadelphia Fury
- Francis J. McManimon (1926–2020), politician who served in the New Jersey General Assembly from 1972 to 1982 and in the New Jersey Senate from 1982 to 1992
- Zack Mesday (born 1994), American football free agent defensive end/linebacker who played college football for Temple University
- Karin Miller (born 1977), former professional tennis player
- Chris Pittaro (born 1961), former Major League Baseball infielder
- Bruce Ritter (1927–1999), Catholic priest and one-time Franciscan friar who founded the charity Covenant House in 1972 for homeless teenagers and led it until he was forced to resign in 1990
- George R. Robbins (1814–1875), represented New Jersey's 2nd congressional district in the United States House of Representatives from 1855 to 1859
- Robert "Bobby" Smith (born 1951), retired U.S. soccer defender and National Soccer Hall of Fame member
- Chris Smith (born 1953), member of the United States House of Representatives from New Jersey's 4th congressional district
