= Zamboanga City Little League team =

Zamboanga City

Information
- League: Little League World Series (Far East Region)
- Location: Zamboanga City
- World Series championships: ~~1992~~ (stripped)
- Coach: Rodolfo Lugay (1992)

The Little League World Series team from Zamboanga City, Philippines representing the Far East Region is noted for winning the 1992 Little League World Series and later for being stripped of the title in the youth baseball tournament for fielding players based outside the city violating residency rules.

== Campaign ==
=== Qualification ===
Zamboanga City's campaign began in the national Little League in the Philippines. Under coach Eduardo Toribio. The team earned the right to represent the country in the Far East Regionals hosted in China.

Toribio was replaced as coach, with personal reasons announced as reason for his departure. They went on to beat teams from traditional baseball powerhouses Taiwan, Japan, and South Korea, becoming the first Philippine team to play in the World Series.

The Far East region has previously won 21 out of 26 past World Series editions, with teams from Taiwan winning 15 of them.

=== 1992 World Series ===
==== Pool play ====
August 24; Game 1	Kaiserslautern (Germany)	2–14	(Philippines) Zamboanga City	Howard J. Lamade Stadium

August 25; Game 2	Salaberry-de-Valleyfield (Canada)	0–2	(Philippines) Zamboanga City	Howard J. Lamade Stadium

August 26; Game 3	Zamboanga City (Philippines)	0–2	(Dominican Republic) Santo Domingo	Howard J. Lamade Stadium

==== Elimination round ====
Semi-finals
August 27
(Philippines) Zamboanga City	5
(Dominican Republic) Santo Domingo	1
August 27
California	1
New Jersey	0

Final
August 29 – Original result (Forfeited)
(Philippines) Zamboanga City	15
California	4

== Reception of win ==
The Zamboanga City team were paraded along Ayala Avenue in Makati after returning from the United States. Philippine President Fidel V. Ramos received the Zamboanga City team at the Malacañang Palace and gave is members ₱1 million ($40,000) incentive to fund their education.

== Scandal ==
Al Mendoza from the Philippine Daily Inquirer and Jess Sison of the Malaya raised questions about some of team members' eligibility after what was supposed be the historic win for a Philippine team, particularly their age and locality of origin. Under Little League regulations players should be aged 10 to 12, and come from a single geographic district including any substitution.

=== 'Out-of-area' players ===
Coach Eduardo Toribio of the original team which won the National Open alleged that the Philippine Sports Commission inserted the eight players based outside the city. These players are based in Cavite, Laguna and Isabela.

=== Other allegations ===
Ian Tolentino in particular was noted to have played at the 1990 Bronco League, an under-13 tournament, which made him overage for the 1992 Little League World Series. Inquirer alleged that six players including team captain Allan Bituin is not who they claim they are. Six overaged boys were claimed to be playing under a name different than their own.

=== Disqualification ===
The Little League Baseball organization stripped Zamboanga City of the title and gave it to initial runners-up Long Beach, California. Philippine officials have admitted to fielding eight players from outside the Zamboanga City's district. The question of the players' ages were never mentioned in the official disqualification.

Long Beach staff lauded the decision but lamented that they preferred to have won the championship "on the field" or via regular play.

Philippine Little League district administrator Armando Andaya resigned but insist that the decision was a "rank injustice" and suggested that the Americans maliciously find a reason to disqualify the Zamboanga City team on a technicality. Players and the parents also accuses the organization of denying them due process.

Inquirer journalists Armand Nocum, Carolyn Arguillas, and Jun Engracia wrote a six-part series which had its first portion published on November 7, 1992, detailing the allegations.

A Senate inquiry was held regarding the matter. The Senate committee on youth and sports development was planning to release its report condemning the disqualification as "arbitrary, whimsical and capricious" but this was revised midway of the publication of Inquirer's series.

== In popular media ==
Gil Portes directed the 2013 film dubbed Liars which featured a team based in the Smokey Mountain which cheated in the Little League World Series set in the 2000s, and was inspired from the 1992 scandal involving the Zamboanga City team.

== Listed squad ==
The following are the listed players for Zamboanga City at the 1992 Little League World Series. Players who actually hails from another area other than Zamboanga City are noted as well.

1. Jemar Alfaro
2. Expedito Alvarez Jr.
3. Jeffrey Bartolome (from Isabela)
4. Allan Bituin
5. Michael Exconde (from San Pablo, Laguna)
6. Jolifer Fridge (from Cavite City)
7. Michael Gonzales (from Cavite City)
8. Enel Llacuna (from Imus, Cavite)
9. Rodel Marcos
10. Marlon Pantaleon
11. Robert Placious (from Isabela)
12. Ignacio Ramacho
13. Tolentino Sagun (from Canlubang, Laguna)
14. Jerwin Sagun (from Canlubang, Laguna)
15. Ian Tolentino

Head coach: Rodolfo Lugay
