= 1992 Little League World Series =

Children's baseball tournament

Tournament details
- Dates: August 25–August 29
- Teams: 8

Final positions
- Champions: (United States) Long Beach Little League; Long Beach, California

The 1992 Little League World Series took place between August 24 and August 29 in South Williamsport, Pennsylvania. The team representing the Zamboanga City Little League, the Filipino representative in the Far East Region, won the International Championship while Long Beach, California, the United States West Region representative, won the U.S. Championship.

In the championship game of the 46th Little League World Series, Zamboanga City defeated Long Beach, 15–4, to become the first Asian team outside of Taiwan, (Note: Taiwan participates under the name Chinese Taipei in many sporting events, including Little League Baseball (LLB). LLWS records and news accounts may use Republic of China, Taiwan, or Chinese Taipei to refer to the same entity.) South Korea, or Japan to be champion. However, it was discovered upon further review that the Filipino team violated age and residency rules and Little League Baseball stripped them of their title. Long Beach was awarded a 6–0 victory by forfeit as per Little League rules and became only the fourth American team in 20 years to become Little League champions.

The championship game did not feature a team from Taiwan for the first time since 1985. This tied the record of six consecutive finals set by Taiwan from 1977 through 1982. To date, this record has not been seriously approached by one country or state.

This was the first edition of the tournament to feature night games, as lights had been added to Howard J. Lamade Stadium following the prior year's tournament.

== Far East series ==
Between 1967, when Japan's West Tokyo won, and 1992, the Little League World Series was won 19 of a possible 25 times by the Far East champion. Competing against the national champions of traditionally stronger baseball nations like Japan, South Korea, and Taiwan, Filipino teams had been unable to qualify for the LLWS. In 1992, however, the Far East was represented by Zamboanga City, which had won the national Filipino title.

== The tournament ==
The 1992 tournament debuted the round-robin format; no longer would a team play against a predetermined opponent in the first round, with the winners facing each other in the semifinal, with the winner advancing to the Saturday championship.

The new format had each team play the other three teams in their bracket, and then having the top two teams play each other in the semifinal, with the winners advancing to the championship.

Zamboanga City defeated the teams from Germany and Quebec before losing to the Dominican Republic, in the round-robin. This was enough to get them into the international final, a rematch with the Dominican Republic, which they won 5–1. The championship game against California was a blowout, with Zamboanga City winning 15–4 after a seven-run first inning. The team was hailed as heroes in the Philippines, President Ramos giving the team a gift of 1,000,000 pesos to contribute to the livelihood of their families. Long Beach head coach Jeff Burroughs remarked that semi-final pitcher "Roberto Placious" had the poise of a high school or college pitcher.

== Teams ==
United States	International
(Illinois) South Holland, Illinois; Central Region; South Holland Little League	(Quebec) Salaberry-de-Valleyfield, Quebec; Canada Region; Valleyfield Little League
(New Jersey) Hamilton Square, New Jersey; East Region; Nottingham Little League	(Germany) Kaiserslautern, Germany; Europe Region; Kaiserslautern Little League
(Louisiana) Lake Charles, Louisiana; South Region; South Lake Charles Little League	(Philippines) Zamboanga City, Philippines; Far East Region; Zamboanga City Little League
(California) Long Beach, California; West Region; Long Beach Little League	(Dominican Republic) Santo Domingo, Dominican Republic; Latin America Region; Epy Guerrero Little League

== Pool play ==
United States
Rank	State	Record
1	California	3–0
2	New Jersey	2–1
3	Louisiana	1–2
4	Illinois	0–3

International
Rank	Country	Record
1	Dominican Republic	3–0
2	Philippines	2–1
3	Canada	1–2
4	Germany	0–3

Pool	Away	Score	Home	Score
August 24
US	California	10	Illinois	6
INT	Dominican Republic	29	Canada	0
INT	Germany	2	Philippines	14
US	Louisiana	0	New Jersey	5
August 25
INT	Dominican Republic	24 (F/4)	Germany	0
US	California	6	New Jersey	4
US	Illinois	2	Louisiana	3 (F/8)
INT	Canada	0	Philippines	2
August 26
US	New Jersey	5	Illinois	2
INT	Canada	10	Germany	3
INT	Philippines	1	Dominican Republic	8
US	California	16	Louisiana	1

== Elimination round ==
Semi-finals
August 27
Philippines	5
Dominican Republic	1
August 27
California	1
New Jersey	0

Final
August 29 Forfeit: see more
Philippines	0
California	6

1992 Little League World Series Champions
Long Beach Little League
Long Beach, California

The Zamboanga City Little League team was disqualified for fielding ineligible players, forfeiting the final to Long Beach.

== Notable players ==
- Sean Burroughs (Long Beach, California), MLB player from 2002 to 2012
- Anthony Forsberg, College player Long Beach State 2001

== Champions path ==
The Long Beach LL had an undefeated record of 12 wins and 0 losses to reach the LLWS. In total their record was 17–0, the last win coming from the forfeit by the Philippines.

Round	Opposition	Result
Section 4
Section 4 Winner's Bracket	(California) Metropolitan LL	5–0
Section 4 Winner's Bracket	(California) Puente Hills LL	4–0
Section 4 Championship	(California) Metropolitan LL	10–3
South California Divisional
Winner's Bracket Opening Round	(California) Eastview LL	1–0
Winner's Bracket Semifinals	(California) Deer Canyon LL	4–3
Winner's Bracket Finals	(California) Northridge American LL	8–0
South Championship	(California) Northridge American LL	10–1
West Regional
Round 1	(Oregon) Raleigh Hills LL	4–3
Quarterfinals	(Alaska) Northstar LL	8–2
Semifinals	(Hawaii) Pearl City LL	3–2
Finals	(California) San Ramon Valley LL	13–4
Finals	(California) San Ramon Valley LL	11–3
