= Mercer Rubber Company =

- Industry: Manufacturing
- Founded: 1865
- Founder: Frederick Sayen family
- Products: Rubber

Mercer Rubber Company is a manufacturer of rubber products.

== History ==
The company was founded in 1865 by the Frederick Sayen family. Mercer Rubber Company operated from a 2.5-acre (10,000 m^{2}) site at 136 Mercer Street in Hamilton Square, an area within Hamilton Township, New Jersey, from 1866 until 1993. The company was purchased from the Sayen family by someone identified in New Jersey government reports only as "Mr. Brennan" in 1977, and from "Mr. Brennan" by Mason Industries in 1983. In January 1993, company operations were relocated to Hauppauge, Suffolk County, New York.

The company manufactured natural rubber products at the Hamilton Square location from 1866 until the 1930s, and synthetic rubber products from the 1930s until the location was closed in 1993. According to the company's web site, Mercer Rubber "started manufacturing mason jar gaskets and other small molded products in 1866" and "moved on to conveyor belting, customized industrial hose, and ultimately, expansion joints" around the beginning of the 20th century.

== Pollution ==
Significant controversy exists regarding Mercer Rubber Company's former Hamilton Square, New Jersey location and Frederick Sayen's former home at 155 Hughes Drive, directly across Mercer Street from the now demolished Rubber Company site.

The Sayen home and its gardens were purchased by Hamilton Township from developer David Cellars in 1988 with the intention of turning the Sayen property into a public park called Sayen Park Botanical Garden.

According to an article in the September 1, 2006 Times of Trenton, an unknown source contacted the New Jersey Department of Environmental Protection in 1991, three days prior to the public opening of Sayen Garden. The source claimed that, "waste chemicals and solid debris (from Mercer Rubber) had been dumped on the Sayen Gardens grounds for years while the property was the home of Frederick Sayen." The Times article states that, although "investigators found evidence that debris had been dumped on the grounds, they did nothing to further verify the complaint." The park opened as scheduled in 1991.

Former employees have substantiated the unknown source's claim, adding that a "pipe underneath the plant carried waste to a stream that ran through the Sayen Gardens property and eventually to Miry Run Brook."

The buildings on the Mercer Rubber Company site were demolished to make way for 11 single-family homes. At that time, soil and sediment samples were taken, and the following chemicals were found to be present:

- Petroleum hydrocarbons
- Volatile and semi-volatile organic compounds
- Polychlorinated biphenyls (PCBs), and
- Metals

The site was subsequently cleaned up in 1996. The NJ Department of Health report also notes that, during the time the plant was in operation, "volatile chemicals were emitted to the air." However the extent of the environmental damage is not known, as "air permit and production records are not available."

In 2000, new dumping charges caused the NJ Department of Environmental Protection to send a letter to Mercer Rubber Company at their Hauppauge, New York location demanding information about waste dumping and the runoff pipe. The DEP also claimed they'd never been previously informed of any dumping allegations in spite of the unknown source's allegations being a matter of record. Norman Mason, owner of Mason Industries, reportedly responded to this letter "saying he knew nothing of dumping on the grounds and did not plan to investigate as the DEP had asked." The matter was then dropped by the NJ DEP.

The matter was put into the spotlight again in late-summer 2006, when residents requested an investigation of what they perceived to be elevated instances of cancer in the immediate area of the former Mercer Rubber Company plant. The report acknowledged that certain types of cancer were more prominent than normal in the area. However, investigators could find no causal relationship between the elevated instances of certain types of cancer and the Mercer Rubber Company plant.

Five individuals, four of them former Mercer Rubber employees, were interviewed in preparation of the report. One interviewee stated that "many drums of liquid" (identified as oil, organic solvents and water) were dumped 500 feet (150 m) north of the Sayen House between 1969 and 1971. Another reported that the location's hydraulic presses leaked "large amounts of lubricating oil," which eventually made its way into a "creek across Mercer Street" via a floor drain. Another interviewee corroborated this account, but stated the practice stopped in 1969, when the company began collecting the oil in drums and dumping it directly "onto the ground 150 yards (140 m) from the Sayen House." Two individuals identified a large drain which carried waste liquids under Mercer Street and into an unnamed creek. Two former employees reported that, prior to 1953, "bulk rubber was burned in the back of the factory." Two others reported that solid waste was dumped "at a location approximately 500 feet (150 m) to the north of the Sayen House and in the ice skating pond near the Township Athletic Baseball field."

At a September 13, 2006, meeting with local residents held at the Nottingham Firehouse, just yards from the old Mercer Rubber site, state officials admitted to residents that the findings reported in the Public Health Assessment are incomplete. The study did not include testing of groundwater, and did not include data from residents who moved away and those who were diagnosed with cancer before 1979.
