= Riverview Cemetery (Trenton, New Jersey) =

Cemetery in Trenton, New Jersey, US

- Cemetery vista featuring the George B. McClellan monument
- Interactive map of Riverview Cemetery

Details
- Location: 870 Centre Street, Trenton, New Jersey
- Coordinates: 40.195°N 74.754°W
- Type: Public
- Owned by: City of Trenton
- No. of graves: up to 45,000
- Find a Grave: Riverview Cemetery
- The Political Graveyard: Riverview Cemetery at The Political Graveyard
- Riverview Cemetery
- U.S. National Register of Historic Places
- New Jersey Register of Historic Places
- Architects: John K. Smith, landscape designer; Charles C. Haven, civil engineer; Calvert Vaux, landscape architect; Micklewright & Mountford, architects
- Architectural style: Art Deco
- NRHP reference No.: 100000810
- NJRHP No.: 3278

Significant dates
- Added to NRHP: March 27, 2017
- Designated NJRHP: February 7, 2017

Riverview Cemetery is a historic cemetery located at 870 Centre Street in the city of Trenton, New Jersey in Mercer County, New Jersey, United States. A number of notables are interred there, including Civil War Union Army Major General and New Jersey Governor George B. McClellan, whose grave is marked by the tallest monument in the cemetery. His wife, Mary Ellen Marcy McClellan, is interred with him.

== History ==
Riverview Cemetery dates back to a Quaker graveyard used in the 1670s overlooking the Delaware River. The cemetery was established in 1699, and was incorporated in 1858 by an act passed by the New Jersey Legislature. It still serves the community today as an active cemetery, with an office and full-time staff. It was expanded and formally landscaped in the 19th century, becoming the burial site of many prominent Trentonians of the era.

The cemetery was added to the National Register of Historic Places on March 27, 2017, for its significance in landscape architecture. It includes one contributing building, two contributing sites, five contributing structures, and 38 contributing objects.

== Notable interments ==
Other notables interred in Riverview are:

- George Antheil (1900–1959), American composer
- William Archinal (1840–1919), Civil War Medal of Honor Recipient
- John T. Bird (1829–1911), represented New Jersey's 3rd congressional district from 1869 to 1873.
- J. Hart Brewer (1844–1900), represented New Jersey's 2nd congressional district in the United States House of Representatives from 1881 to 1885.
- Frank O. Briggs (1851–1913), United States Senator from New Jersey
- William L. Dayton (1807–1864), United States Senator from New Jersey and Republican Party vice presidential candidate.
- William Halstead (1794–1878), United States Congressman from New Jersey and Civil War Army officer (founder and first Colonel of the 1st New Jersey Volunteer Cavalry regiment)
- George Peter Ihrie (1827–1903), Civil War Union Brevet Brigadier General.
- Walter Scott Lenox (1859–1920), founder of Lenox china
- Randolph B. Marcy (1812–1887, Civil War Union Army Brigadier General, and father of Mary Ellen Marcy McClellan
- George B. McClellan (1826–1885), Civil War Union Army Major General, 24th Governor of New Jersey 1878 to 1881
- Gershom Mott (1822–1884), Civil War Union Army Major General
- A. Dayton Oliphant (1887–1963), Justice of the New Jersey Supreme Court from 1945 to 1946, 1948 to 1957.
- Samuel D. Oliphant (1824–1904), Civil War Union Army Brevet Brigadier General
- D. Lane Powers (1896–1968), United States Congressman from New Jersey
- John A. Roebling (1800–1869), German-American industrialist and civil engineer, designer of the Brooklyn Bridge.
- James F. Rusling (1834–1918), Civil War Union Army Brevet Brigadier General.
- 'Edward W. Scudder (1822–1893) was a Justice of the New Jersey Supreme Court from 1869 until his death.
- John Taylor (1837–1909), served in the New Jersey Senate and was the creator of Pork roll.
- William S. Truex (1819–1889), Civil War Union Army Brevet Brigadier General.
- Bennett Van Syckel (1830–1921) Associate Justice of the New Jersey Supreme Court from 1889 to 1900
- Evan M. Woodward (1838–1904), Civil War Medal of Honor Recipient

== Gallery ==
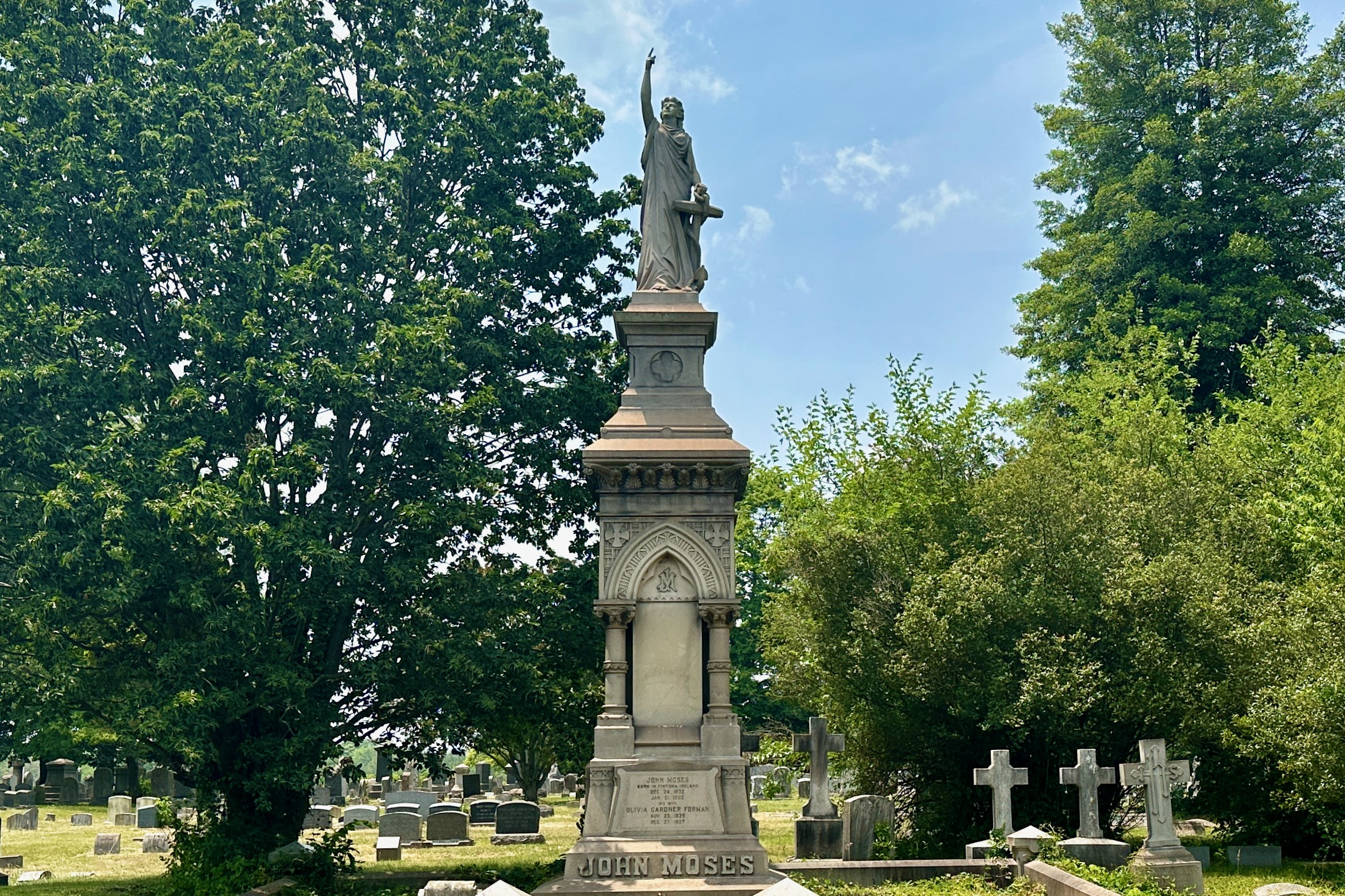
John Moses, with a statue of Hope

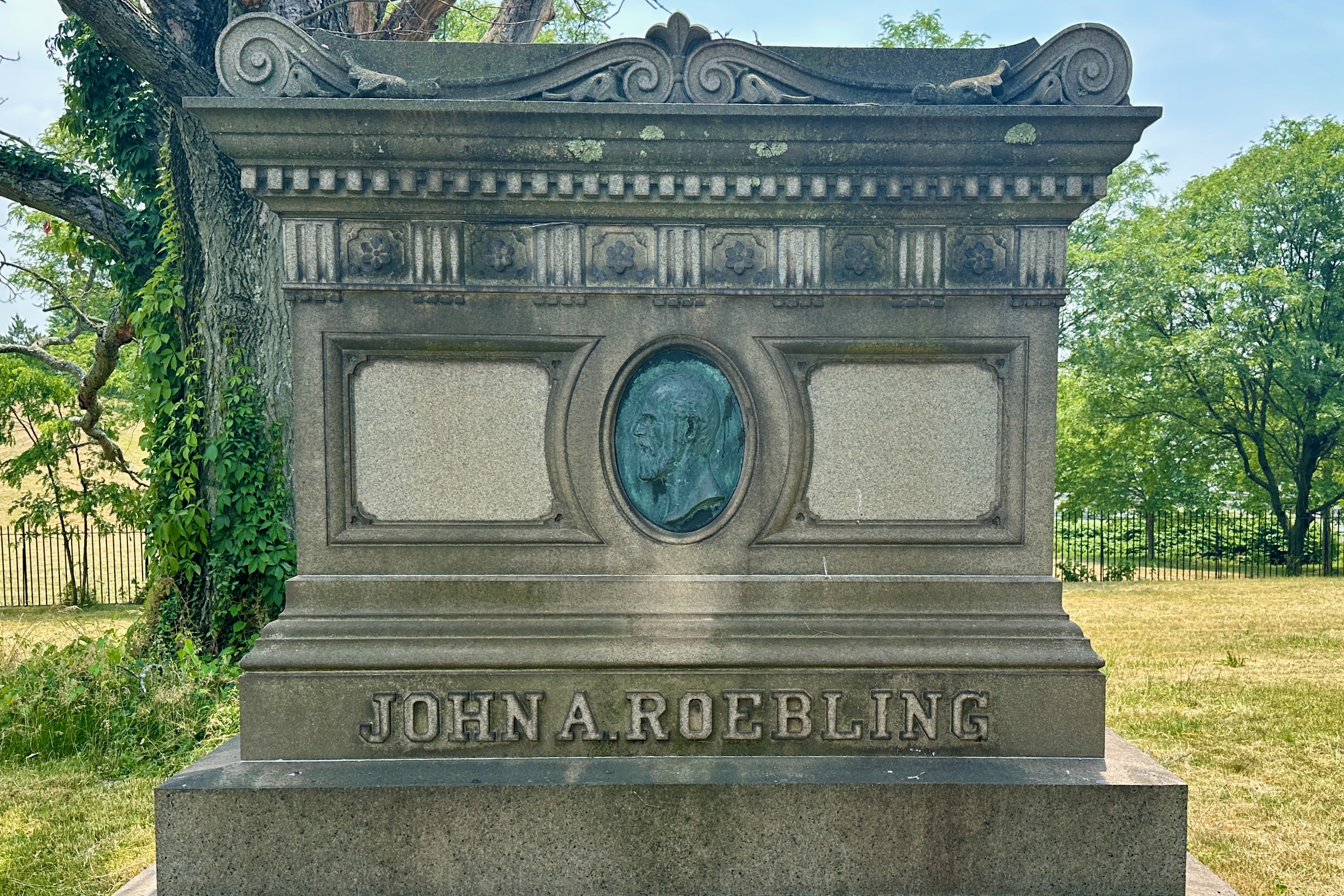
John A. Roebling

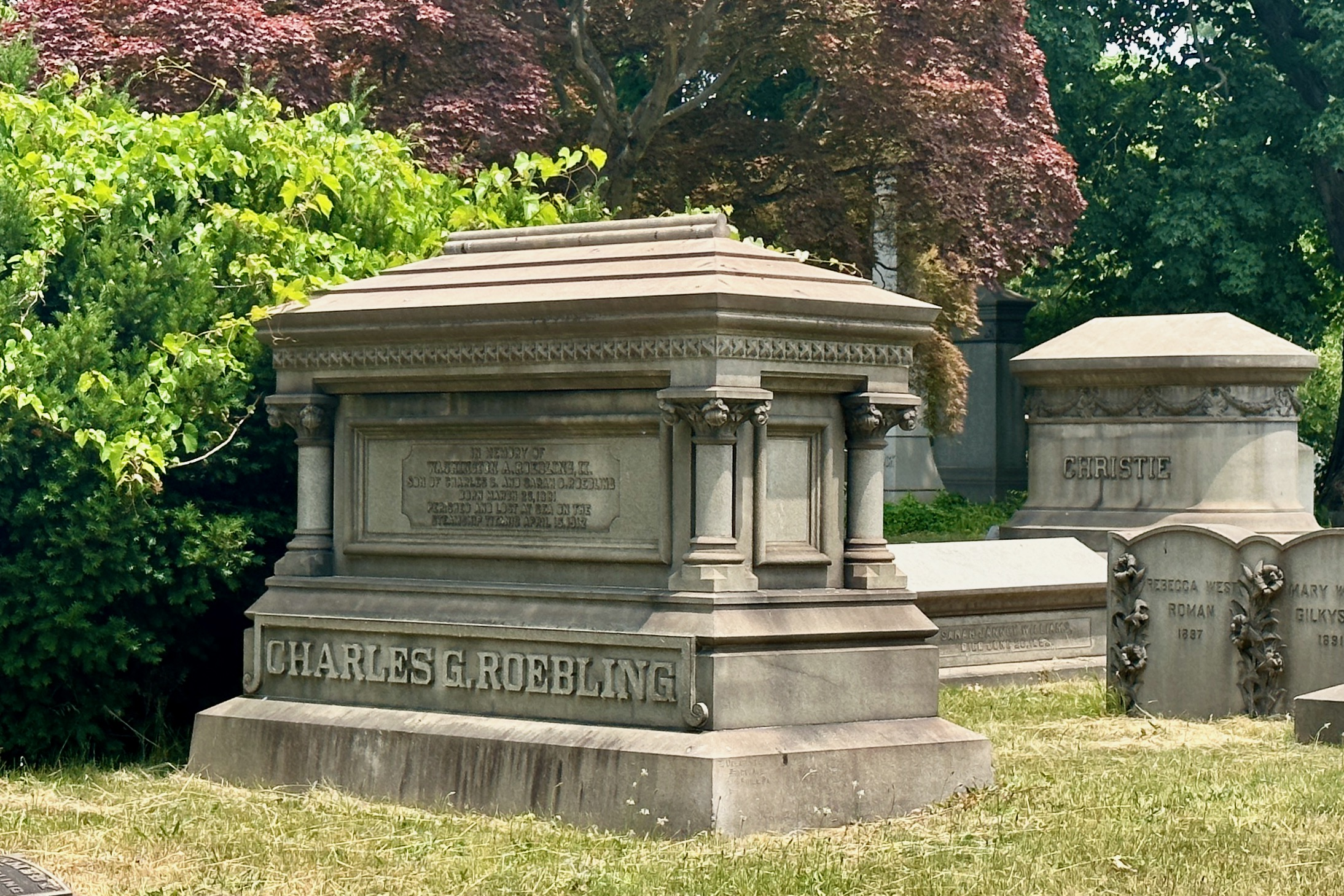
Charles G. Roebling and cenotaph of his son Washington A. Roebling II whose body was never recovered when he perished in the Titanic Sinking

== See also ==
- National Register of Historic Places listings in Mercer County, New Jersey
- List of cemeteries in New Jersey
