= Van Syckel =

Van Syckel may refer to:

- Van Syckel, New Jersey
- Bennet Van Syckel (1830–1921), Associate Justice of the New Jersey Supreme Court
