= Sayen Park Botanical Garden =

Municipal park and botanical garden in Hamilton Township, New Jersey

Coordinates: 40.2359°N 74.6583°W

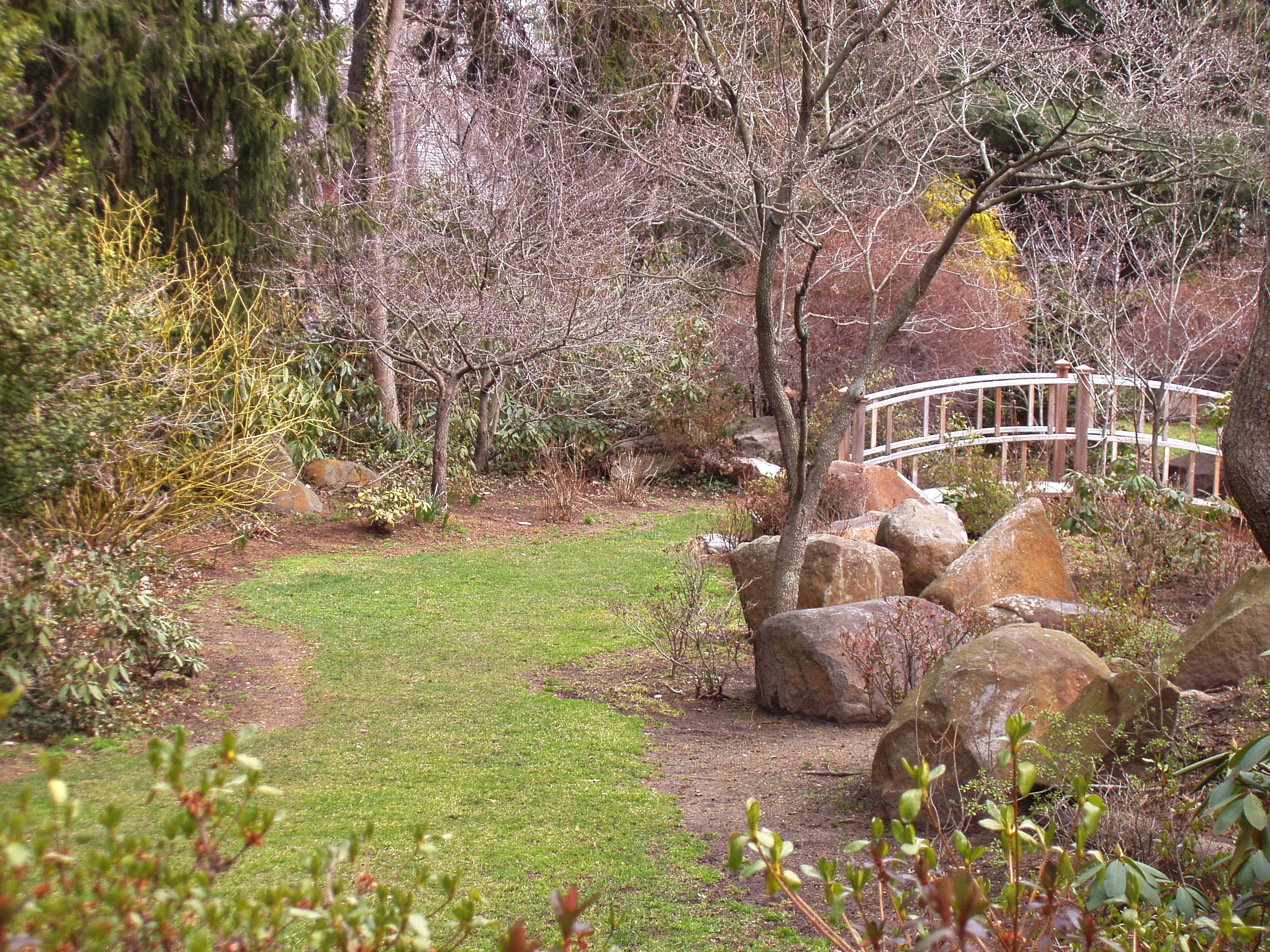
Sayen Park Botanical Garden in early spring.

Sayen Park Botanical Garden (30 acres), also known as Sayen House and Gardens, is a municipal park and botanical garden located at 155 Hughes Drive, Hamilton Square, an area within Hamilton Township, New Jersey. The garden is open year-round from dawn to dusk without charge, though park activity is at its peak in the spring.

The garden began in 1912 when Frederick Sayen (1885–1981) purchased the site with his wife, Anne Mellon (1886–1977), a daughter of the Mellon family. The Sayens built a "bungalow" home in the Arts and Crafts style, though with Victorian interior design, and surrounded it with plants and flowers acquired during world travels. The principal collections include species from China, Japan, and England.

The Sayen site became municipal property in 1988, when Hamilton Township purchased the site from developer David Cellars. The park was opened to the public in 1991. The township expanded and improved the park in 2003. Today the garden contains more than 1,000 azaleas, nearly 500 rhododendrons, and more than 250,000 flowering bulbs for spring display, as well as ponds, bridges, gazebos, and walking trails.

Sayen House and Gardens hosts an annual Azalea Festival each Mother's Day, during which Sayen House is open to the public from 10AM to 4PM.

== Pollution ==
On September 1, 2006, an article in the Times of Trenton disclosed that New Jersey officials were warned about pollution at the Sayen House and Gardens site three days before the park opened in 1991. According to an anonymous source in 1991, the site had been used "for years" as a dumping ground for "waste chemicals and solid debris" from the now-defunct Mercer Rubber Company site located across the street at 136 Mercer Street. The Mercer Rubber Company was also formerly owned by the Sayen family. Former employees have corroborated the anonymous 1991 complaint, adding that a "pipe underneath the plant carried waste to a stream that ran through the Sayen Gardens property and eventually to Miry Run Brook."

Local residents had noted what they believed to be elevated instances of some types of cancer among people who lived within a one-mile radius of the park. Officials investigated, noting that the instance of certain types of cancer were indeed elevated in the area. They were, however, unable to establish a causal link to the Mercer Rubber Company debris.

At a September 13, 2006 meeting with local residents held at the Nottingham Firehouse, just yards from the old Mercer Rubber site and Sayen Park, state officials admitted to concerned residents that their findings reported in the Public Health Assessment are incomplete. The study did not include testing of groundwater or include data from residents who moved away or those who were diagnosed with cancer before 1979.

== See also ==
- List of botanical gardens in the United States
