= HQM =

HQM may refer to:

- Bowerman Airport, in Hoquiam, Washington, United States
- Hatfield Quality Meats, an American meat packer
- HQM Sachsenring GmbH, a German autoparts manufacturer
