= Evan M. Woodward =

American civil war soldier

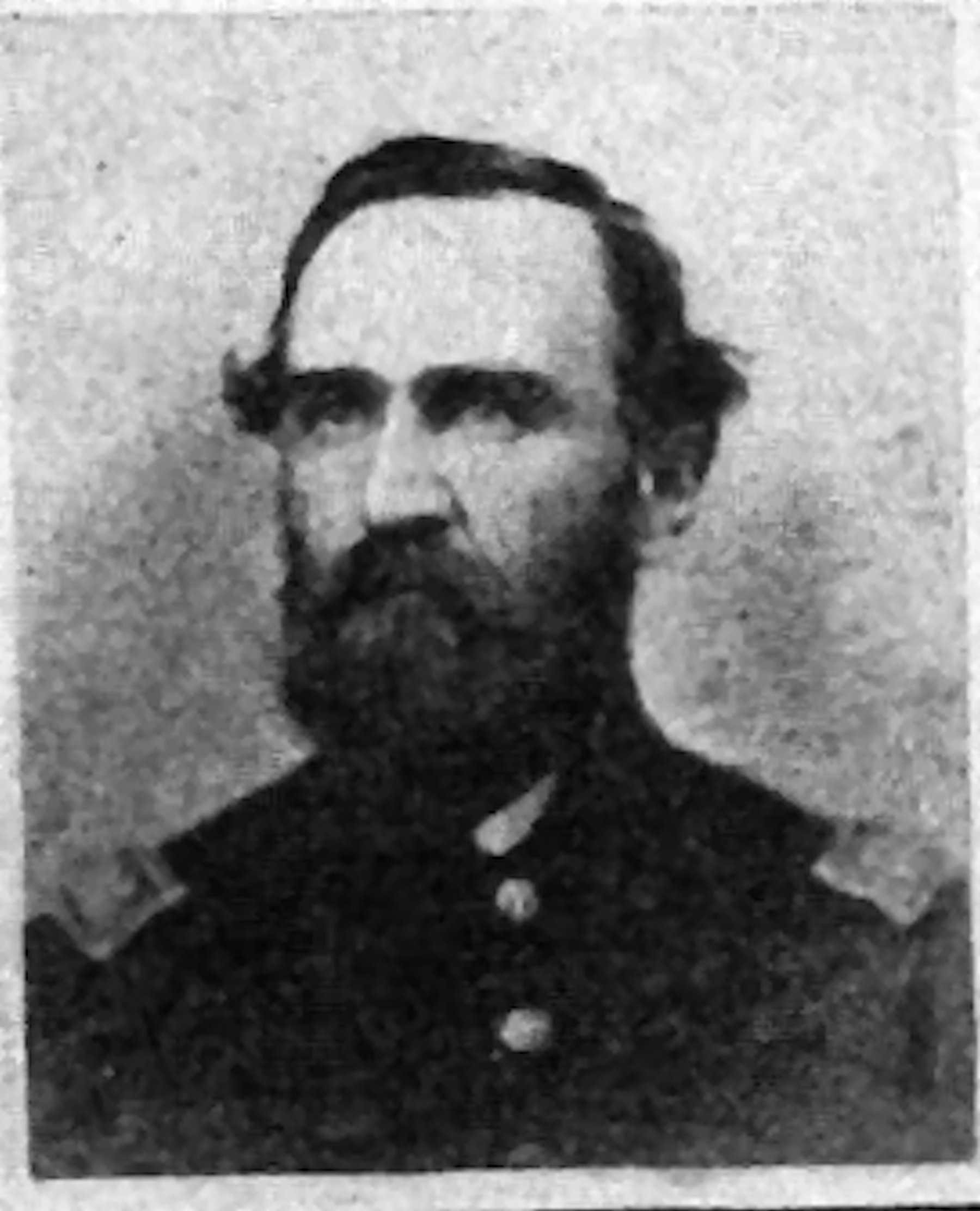
Evan M. Woodward

Evan M. Woodward (March 11, 1838 – August 15, 1904) was an American Medal of Honor recipient who fought in the Union Army during the American Civil War. Woodward was born in Philadelphia, Pennsylvania and is now buried at Riverview Cemetery, New Jersey.

Woodward was a member of the 2nd Pennsylvania Reserve Regiment at the Battle of Fredericksburg when he earned the Medal of Honor.

== Medal of Honor citation ==
For extraordinary heroism on December 13, 1862, in action at Fredericksburg, Virginia. First Lieutenant Woodward advanced between the lines, demanded and received the surrender of the 19th Georgia Infantry and captured their battle flag.
