= Mercerville, New Jersey =

Populated place in Mercer County, New Jersey, US

- Census-designated place
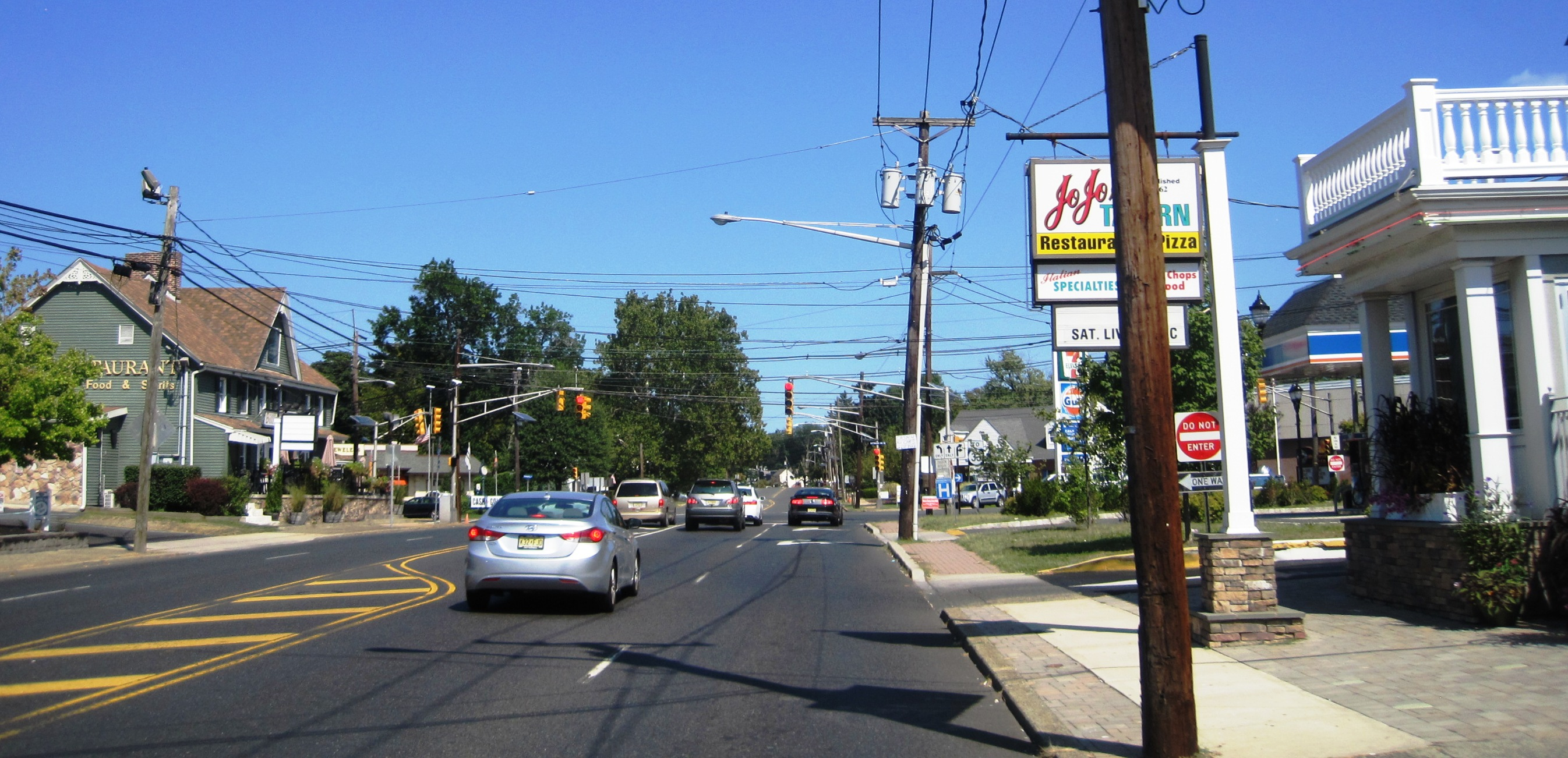
- The Five Points intersection

- Location in Mercer County and the state of New Jersey

- Location in Mercer County Location in New Jersey Location in the United States
- Coordinates: 40.235832°N 74.692254°W
- Country: United States
- State: New Jersey
- County: Mercer
- Township: Hamilton

Area
  - Total: 3.72 sq mi (9.63 km^{2})
  - Land: 3.69 sq mi (9.55 km^{2})
  - Water: 0.031 sq mi (0.08 km^{2}) 1.14%
- Elevation: 98 ft (30 m)

Population (2020)
  - Total: 13,447
  - Density: 3,646.1/sq mi (1,407.8/km^{2})
- Time zone: UTC−05:00 (Eastern (EST))
  - Summer (DST): UTC−04:00 (Eastern (EDT))
- ZIP Code: 08619
- FIPS code: 34-45480
- GNIS feature ID: 02389472

Mercerville is an unincorporated community and census-designated place (CDP) located within Hamilton Township, in Mercer County, in the U.S. state of New Jersey. As of the 2020 census, the CDP's population was 13,447. Until after the 2000 census, the area was part of the Mercerville-Hamilton Square CDP. For the 2010 Census it was split into two CDPs, Mercerville and Hamilton Square.

== History ==
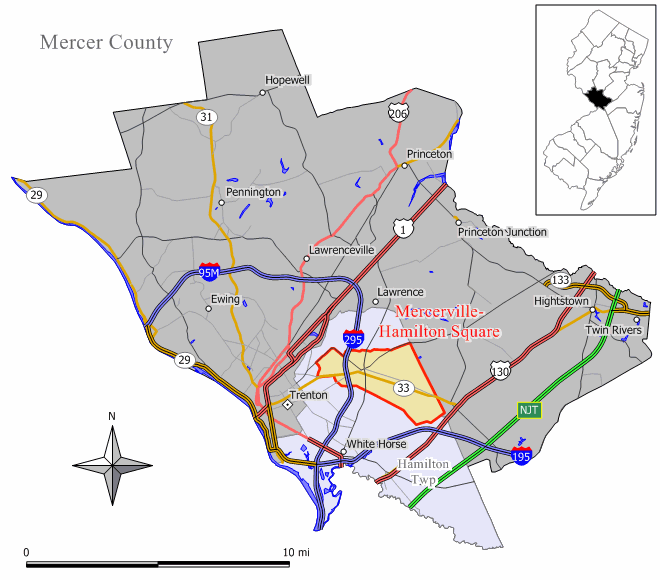
Map of the former Mercerville-Hamilton Square CDP in Mercer County (inset: Location of Mercer County in New Jersey)

Many historical markers in Mercerville detail the path of the Continental Army under the command of George Washington through the area during the American Revolutionary War. Several are related to their night march from the Second Battle of Trenton to the Battle of Princeton.

Originally called "Sandtown", Mercerville is named after General Hugh Mercer, who died on January 12, 1777, due to wounds incurred at the Battle of Princeton. Hamilton Square was renamed after Alexander Hamilton, during a wave of anti-British sentiment at the time of the War of 1812. It previously had been called Nottingham after the British town.

== Geography ==
Mercerville is in southern Mercer County, built around a major intersection known as Five Points. It is bordered to the east by Hamilton Square, and the center of Trenton, the state capital, is 4 miles (6 km) to the west. Five Points is the junction of (starting north and heading clockwise): Quaker Bridge Road (County Route 533), Edinburg Road (CR 535), Nottingham Way (CR 618), White Horse-Mercerville Road (CR 533), and Nottingham Way (CR 535). New Jersey Route 33 runs east and west to the south of this intersection. Except for Nottingham Way east of Five Points, the preceding roads contain most of Mercerville's commercial businesses. Interstate 295 passes through the west side of Mercerville, with access to NJ 33 from Exit 63 and partial access to East State Street from Exit 64.

According to the United States Census Bureau, the Mercerville CDP has a total area of 3.72 square miles (9.63 km^{2}), including 3.69 square miles (9.56 km^{2}) of land and 0.03 square miles (0.08 km^{2}) of water (0.86%). The community drains north toward Miry Run and south toward Pond Run, both west-flowing tributaries of Assunpink Creek and part of the Delaware River watershed.

== Demographics ==
Historical population
Census	Pop.	Note	%±
2010	13,230		—
2020	13,447		1.6%
U.S. Decennial Census; 2010 2020

Mercerville first appeared as a census designated place in the 2010 U.S. census formed from part of the deleted Mercerville-Hamilton Square CDP.

=== Racial and ethnic composition ===
Mercerville CDP, New Jersey – Racial and ethnic composition Note: the US Census treats Hispanic/Latino as an ethnic category. This table excludes Latinos from the racial categories and assigns them to a separate category. Hispanics/Latinos may be of any race.
Race / Ethnicity (NH = Non-Hispanic)	Pop 2010	Pop 2020	% 2010	% 2020
White alone (NH)	11,189	9,551	84.57%	71.03%
Black or African American alone (NH)	491	897	3.71%	6.67%
Native American or Alaska Native alone (NH)	15	12	0.11%	0.09%
Asian alone (NH)	486	661	3.67%	4.92%
Native Hawaiian or Pacific Islander alone (NH)	0	5	0.00%	0.04%
Other race alone (NH)	17	29	0.13%	0.22%
Mixed race or Multiracial (NH)	125	425	0.94%	3.16%
Hispanic or Latino (any race)	907	1,867	6.86%	13.88%
Total	13,230	13,447	100.00%	100.00%

=== 2020 census ===
As of the 2020 census, Mercerville had a population of 13,447. The median age was 44.4 years. 17.9% of residents were under the age of 18, and 20.2% were 65 years of age or older. For every 100 females, there were 94.3 males, and for every 100 females age 18 and over, there were 91.7 males age 18 and over.

100.0% of residents lived in urban areas, while 0.0% lived in rural areas.

There were 5,094 households in Mercerville, of which 27.8% had children under the age of 18 living in them. Of all households, 54.1% were married-couple households, 15.0% were households with a male householder and no spouse or partner present, and 23.7% were households with a female householder and no spouse or partner present. About 22.8% of all households were made up of individuals, and 11.3% had someone living alone who was 65 years of age or older.

There were 5,279 housing units, of which 3.5% were vacant. The homeowner vacancy rate was 1.1%, and the rental vacancy rate was 4.6%.

=== 2010 census ===
The 2010 United States census counted 13,230 people, 5,028 households, and 3,605 families in the CDP. The population density was 3,588.5 per square mile (1,385.5/km^{2}). There were 5,246 housing units at an average density of 1,422.9 per square mile (549.4/km^{2}). The racial makeup was 88.81% (11,749) White, 3.98% (527) Black or African American, 0.22% (29) Native American, 3.67% (486) Asian, 0.04% (5) Pacific Islander, 1.90% (252) from other races, and 1.38% (182) from two or more races. Hispanic or Latino of any race were 6.86% (907) of the population.

Of the 5,028 households, 28.9% had children under the age of 18; 57.8% were married couples living together; 10.1% had a female householder with no husband present and 28.3% were non-families. Of all households, 22.9% were made up of individuals and 11.2% had someone living alone who was 65 years of age or older. The average household size was 2.58 and the average family size was 3.06.

20.7% of the population were under the age of 18, 7.0% from 18 to 24, 25.0% from 25 to 44, 29.6% from 45 to 64, and 17.7% who were 65 years of age or older. The median age was 43.1 years. For every 100 females, the population had 92.9 males. For every 100 females ages 18 and older there were 90.1 males.

== Education ==
All of Hamilton Township, including Mercerville, is served by the Hamilton Township School District.

Most high school students in Mercerville attend Nottingham High School.
