= 30th Ohio Infantry Regiment =

- Active: August 28, 1861, to August 13, 1865
- Country: United States
- Allegiance: Union
- Branch: Union Army
- Type: Infantry
- Engagements: Battle of Carnifex Ferry; Second Battle of Bull Run (six companies); Maryland Campaign; Battle of South Mountain; Battle of Antietam; Siege of Vicksburg, May 19 & May 22 assaults; Siege of Jackson; Battle of Missionary Ridge; Atlanta campaign; Battle of Resaca; Battle of Dallas; Battle of New Hope Church; Battle of Allatoona; Battle of Kennesaw Mountain; Battle of Atlanta; Siege of Atlanta; Battle of Jonesborough; Battle of Lovejoy's Station; Sherman's March to the Sea; Carolinas campaign; Battle of Bentonville

The 30th Ohio Infantry Regiment was an infantry regiment in the Union Army during the American Civil War.

== Service ==
The 30th Ohio Infantry Regiment was organized at Camp Chase in Columbus, Ohio, on August 28, 1861, and mustered in for three years service under the command of Colonel John Groesbeck.

The regiment was attached to Scammon's Brigade, District of the Kanawha, West Virginia, to October 1861. 3rd Brigade, District of the Kanawha, West Virginia, to March 1862. 1st Brigade, Kanawha Division West Virginia, Department of the Mountains, to September 1862. 1st Brigade, Kanawha Division, IX Corps, Army of the Potomac, to October 1862. 1st Brigade, Kanawha Division, District of West Virginia, Department of the Ohio, to January 1863. 3rd Brigade, 2nd Division, XV Corps, Army of the Tennessee, to October 1863. 2nd Brigade, 2nd Division, XV Corps, to August 1864. 1st Brigade, 2nd Division, XV Corps, to July 1865. Department of Arkansas, to August 1865.

The 30th Ohio Infantry mustered out of service at Little Rock, Arkansas, on August 13, 1865.

=== Detailed service ===
==== 1861 ====
- Moved to Clarksburg, Va., August 30-September 2, thence moved to Weston and to Suttonville September 3–6.
- Action at Carnifex Ferry, Va., September 10, 1861.
- Advance to Sewell Mountain September 24, then to Falls of the Gauley.
- Operations in the Kanawha Valley and New River Region October 19-November 16.
- Moved to Fayetteville November 14, and duty there until April 17, 1862. (Companies D, F, G, and I served detached at Sutton September 6-December 23, 1861, then rejoined the regiment at Fayetteville.)

==== 1862 ====
- Advance on Princeton April 22-May 5.
- About Princeton May 15–18.
- Moved to Flat Top Mountain May 19, and duty there until August.
- Moved to Washington, D.C., August 16–22.
- Pope's Campaign in northern Virginia.
- Right Wing at Gen. Pope's Headquarters until September 3.
- Left Wing in Robertson's Brigade until August 31.
- Battles of Bull Run August 28–30.
- Maryland Campaign September 6–22.
- Battles of South Mountain September 14;
- Antietam September 16–17.
- March to Clear Springs October 8, then to Hancock October 9.
- March to the Kanawha Valley October 12-November 13.
- Camp at Cannelton November 13-December 1.
- Expedition toward Logan Court House December 1–10.

==== 1863 ====
- Ordered to Louisville, Ky., December, then to Helena, Ark., and to Young's Point, La., January 21, 1863.
- Duty there until March.
- Expedition to Rolling Fork via Muddy, Steele's and Black Bayous and Deer Creek March 14–27.
- Demonstrations against Haines and Drumgould's Bluffs April 27-May 1.
- Movement to join army in rear of Vicksburg, Miss., via Richmond and Grand Gulf May 2–14.
- Siege of Vicksburg May 18-July-4.
- Assaults on Vicksburg May 19 and 22.
- Advance on Jackson, Miss., July 5–10.
- Siege of Jackson July 10–17.
- Camp at Big Black until September 26.
- Moved to Memphis, Tenn., thence marched to Chattanooga, Tenn., September 26-November 20.
- Sequatchie Valley October 5.
- Operations on Memphis & Charleston Railroad in Alabama October 20–29.
- Bear Creek, Tuscumbia, October 27.
- Chattanooga-Ringgold Campaign November 23–27.
- Tunnel Hill November 24–25.
- Missionary Ridge November 25.
- March to relief of Knoxville November 27-December 8.
- Moved to Bridgeport, Ala., December 19, thence to Bellefonte Station December 26, and to Larkin's Ferry January 26, 1864.

==== 1864 ====
- Moved to Cleveland, Tenn., Veterans absent on furlough April and May. Rejoined regiment at Kingston, Ga. Atlanta Campaign May 1-September 8, 1864.
- Demonstrations on Resaca May 8–13.
- Near Resaca May 13.
- Battle of Resaca May 14–15.
- Advance on Dallas May 18–25.
- Operations on line of Pumpkin Vine Creek and battles about Dallas, New Hope Church, and Allatoona Hills May 25-June 5.
- Operations about Marietta and against Kennesaw Mountain June 10-July 2.
- Assault on Kennesaw June 27.
- Nickajack Creek July 2–5. Ruff's Mills July 3–4.
- Chattahoochie River July 5–17.
- Battle of Atlanta July 22.
- Siege of Atlanta July 22-August 25.
- Ezra Chapel, Hood's second sortie, July 28.
- Flank movement on Jonesborough August 25–30.
- Battle of Jonesborough August 31-September 1.
- Lovejoy's Station September 2–6.
- Operations against Hood in northern Georgia and northern Alabama September 29-November 3.
- March to the sea November 15-December 10.
- Clinton November 21–23.
- Siege of Savannah December 10–21.
- Fort McAllister December 13.

==== 1865 ====
- Campaign of the Carolinas January to April 1865.
- Duck Branch, near Loper's Cross Roads, S.C., February 2.
- South Edisto River February 9.
- North Edisto River February 11–13.
- Columbia February 16–17.
- Battle of Bentonville, N.C., March 20–21.
- Occupation of Goldsboro March 24.
- Advance on Raleigh April 10–14.
- Occupation of Raleigh April 14.
- Bennett's House April 26.
- Surrender of Johnston and his army.
- March to Washington, D.C., via Richmond, Va., April 29-May 20.
- Grand Review of the Armies May 24.
- Moved to Louisville, Ky., June 2, thence to Little Rock, Ark., June 25, and duty there until August.

== Casualties ==
The regiment lost a total of 277 men during service; 9 officers and 119 enlisted men killed or mortally wounded, 149 enlisted men died of disease.

== Commanders ==
- Colonel John Groesbeck
- Colonel Hugh Boyle Ewing - assumed brigade command during the Battle of Antietam
- Colonel Theodore Jones - commanded at the battles of Second Bull Run and Antietam as lieutenant colonel (at the latter, he was wounded and captured); commanded during the Siege of Vicksburg
- Lieutenant Colonel George H. Hildt - commanded at the Battle of Antietam as major; commanded during the Siege of Vicksburg

== Notable members ==
- Corporal William J. Archinal, Company I - Medal of Honor — Participating in a diversionary "forlorn hope" attack on Confederate defenses, 22 May 1863.
- Private Uriah Brown, Company G - Medal of Honor — Participating in the same "forlorn hope."
- Corporal William Campbell, Company I - Medal of Honor — Participating in the same "forlorn hope."
- Private Sampson Harris, Company K - Medal of Honor — Participating in the same "forlorn hope."
- Private William H. Longshore, Company D - Medal of Honor — Participating in the same "forlorn hope."
- Private James M. McClelland, Company B - Medal of Honor — Participating in the same "forlorn hope."
- Private Wilson McGonagle, Company B - Medal of Honor — Participating in the same "forlorn hope."
- Corporal Platt Pearsall, Company C - Medal of Honor — Participating in the same "forlorn hope."
- 1st Sergeant Andrew Schmauch, Company A - Medal of Honor — Participating in the same "forlorn hope."

== See also ==
- List of Ohio Civil War units
- Ohio in the Civil War
