= Hamilton Square, New Jersey =

Populated place in Mercer County, New Jersey, US

- Census-designated place
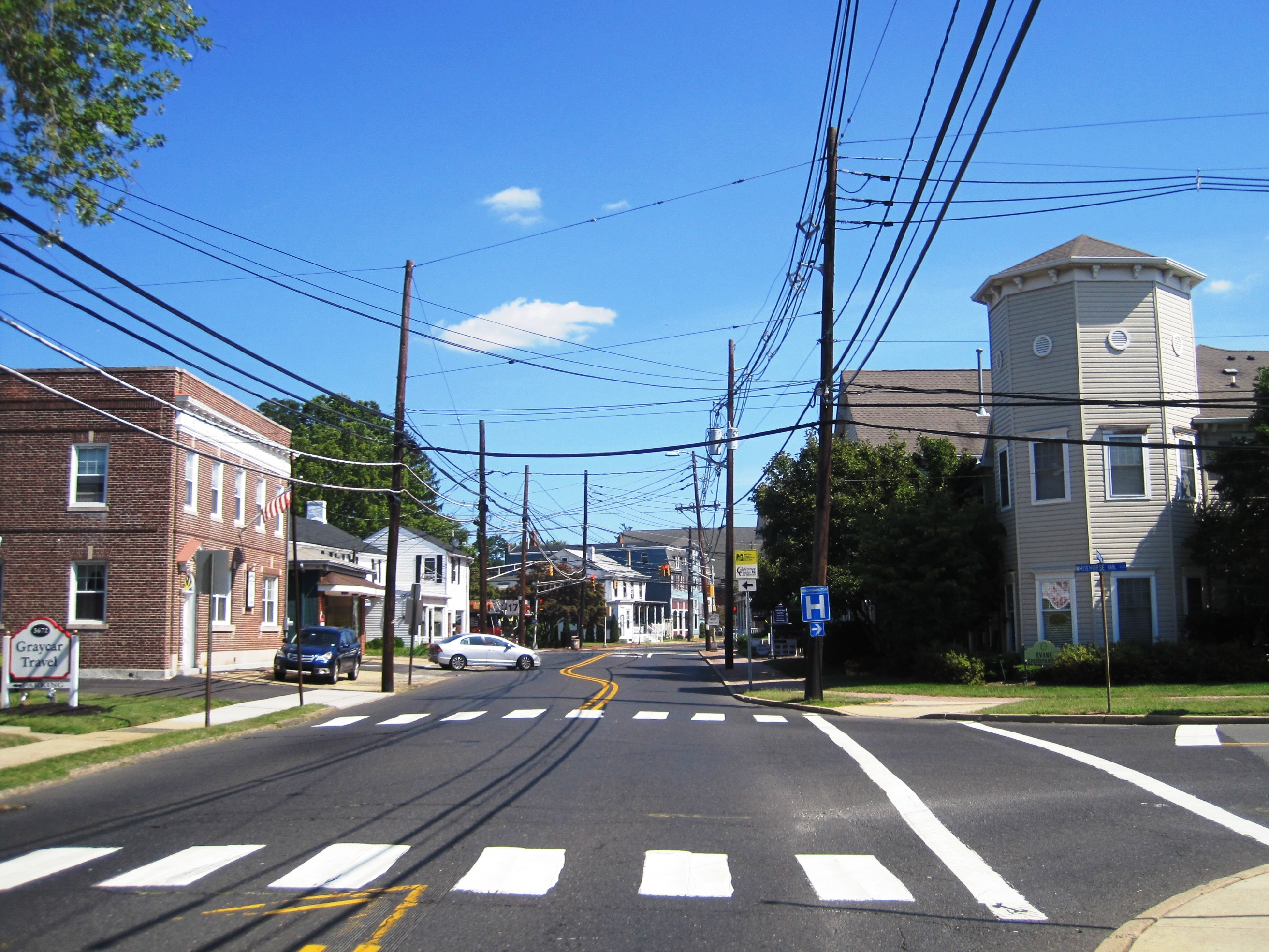
- Center of Hamilton Square

- Location in Mercer County and the state of New Jersey

- Location in Mercer County Location in New Jersey Location in the United States
- Coordinates: 40.225029°N 74.650481°W
- Country: United States
- State: New Jersey
- County: Mercer
- Township: Hamilton
- Named for: Alexander Hamilton

Area
  - Total: 4.34 sq mi (11.23 km^{2})
  - Land: 4.27 sq mi (11.07 km^{2})
  - Water: 0.058 sq mi (0.15 km^{2}) 0.56%
- Elevation: 102 ft (31 m)

Population (2020)
  - Total: 12,679
  - Density: 2,965/sq mi (1,144.9/km^{2})
- Time zone: UTC−05:00 (Eastern (EST))
  - Summer (DST): UTC−04:00 (Eastern (EDT))
- ZIP Code: 08690
- FIPS code: 34-29370
- GNIS feature ID: 02583998

Hamilton Square is an unincorporated community and census-designated place (CDP) located within Hamilton Township, in Mercer County, in the U.S. state of New Jersey, that is the site of a historic colonial village. Until the 2000 census the area was part of the Mercerville-Hamilton Square CDP, which was split into two CDPs as of 2010: Mercerville and Hamilton Square.

Hamilton Square was established in 1692 and was named after Alexander Hamilton in a wave of anti-British feeling at the time of the War of 1812. It previously had been called "Nottingham" after the British town. As of the 2020 census, the CDP's population was 12,679.

== Geography ==
Hamilton Square is in southern Mercer County, 5 miles (8 km) east of Trenton, the state capital. The CDP is in the eastern part of Hamilton Township and is bordered to the east by Robbinsville Township. The community of Mercerville borders Hamilton Square to the west.

New Jersey Route 33 passes through the center of Hamilton Square, leading west into Trenton and east to U.S. Route 206 and thence Hightstown. U.S. 206 forms the southeast border of the Hamilton Square CDP, while Interstate 195 forms the southern border.

According to the United States Census Bureau, Hamilton Square has a total area of 4.367 square miles (11.312 km^{2}), including 4.343 square miles (11.249 km^{2}) of land and 0.024 square miles (0.063 km^{2}) of water (0.56%). The center of the community is on high ground which drains north toward Miry Run and south toward Pond Run, both of which are west-flowing tributaries of Assunpink Creek leading to the Delaware River in Trenton.

== Demographics ==
Historical population
Census	Pop.	Note	%±
2010	12,784		—
2020	12,679		−0.8%
U.S. Decennial Census; 2010 2020

Hamilton Square first appeared as a census designated place in the 2010 U.S. census formed from part of the deleted Mercerville-Hamilton Square CDP and additional area.

=== Racial and ethnic composition ===
Hamilton Square CDP, New Jersey – Racial and ethnic composition Note: the US Census treats Hispanic/Latino as an ethnic category. This table excludes Latinos from the racial categories and assigns them to a separate category. Hispanics/Latinos may be of any race.
Race / Ethnicity (NH = Non-Hispanic)	Pop 2010	Pop 2020	% 2010	% 2020
White alone (NH)	11,495	10,632	89.92%	83.86%
Black or African American alone (NH)	216	318	1.69%	2.51%
Native American or Alaska Native alone (NH)	9	8	0.07%	0.06%
Asian alone (NH)	455	479	3.56%	3.78%
Native Hawaiian or Pacific Islander alone (NH)	3	5	0.02%	0.04%
Other race alone (NH)	3	22	0.02%	0.17%
Mixed race or Multiracial (NH)	116	316	0.91%	2.49%
Hispanic or Latino (any race)	487	899	3.81%	7.09%
Total	12,784	12,679	100.00%	100.00%

=== 2020 census ===
As of the 2020 census, Hamilton Square had a population of 12,679. The median age was 46.8 years. 18.4% of residents were under the age of 18 and 23.1% of residents were 65 years of age or older. For every 100 females there were 94.2 males, and for every 100 females age 18 and over there were 91.6 males age 18 and over.

100.0% of residents lived in urban areas, while 0.0% lived in rural areas.

There were 4,614 households in Hamilton Square, of which 29.3% had children under the age of 18 living in them. Of all households, 65.2% were married-couple households, 10.2% were households with a male householder and no spouse or partner present, and 20.7% were households with a female householder and no spouse or partner present. About 18.5% of all households were made up of individuals and 10.3% had someone living alone who was 65 years of age or older.

There were 4,734 housing units, of which 2.5% were vacant. The homeowner vacancy rate was 1.1% and the rental vacancy rate was 11.3%.

=== 2010 census ===
The 2010 United States census counted 12,784 people, 4,532 households, and 3,703 families in the CDP. The population density was 2,943.4 per square mile (1,136.5/km^{2}). There were 4,618 housing units at an average density of 1,063.3 per square mile (410.5/km^{2}). The racial makeup was 92.76% (11,858) White, 1.74% (223) Black or African American, 0.08% (10) Native American, 3.57% (457) Asian, 0.02% (3) Pacific Islander, 0.64% (82) from other races, and 1.18% (151) from two or more races. Hispanic or Latino of any race were 3.81% (487) of the population.

Of the 4,532 households, 33.0% had children under the age of 18; 69.7% were married couples living together; 8.7% had a female householder with no husband present and 18.3% were non-families. Of all households, 15.9% were made up of individuals and 8.8% had someone living alone who was 65 years of age or older. The average household size was 2.79 and the average family size was 3.13.

22.2% of the population were under the age of 18, 7.7% from 18 to 24, 21.5% from 25 to 44, 32.9% from 45 to 64, and 15.6% who were 65 years of age or older. The median age was 44.1 years. For every 100 females, the population had 93.6 males. For every 100 females ages 18 and older there were 89.6 males.

== Education ==
All of Hamilton Township, including Hamilton Square, is served by the Hamilton Township School District.

Schools that service the Hamilton Square area are: Morgan Elementary School, Sayen Elementary School, Langtree Elementary School, Alexander Elementary School, Robinson Elementary School, Reynolds Middle School, Crockett Middle School, Nottingham High School, and Steinert High School.

== Climate ==
According to the Köppen climate classification system, Hamilton Square has a Humid subtropical climate (Cfa).

Climate data for Hamilton Square, NJ (40.2241, -74.6522), Elevation 95 ft (29 m), 1991-2020 normals, 1981-2025 extremes
Month	Jan	Feb	Mar	Apr	May	Jun	Jul	Aug	Sep	Oct	Nov	Dec	Year
Record high °F (°C)	71.8 (22.1)	77.4 (25.2)	88.1 (31.2)	95.6 (35.3)	95.3 (35.2)	100.3 (37.9)	102.5 (39.2)	101.1 (38.4)	97.7 (36.5)	93.6 (34.2)	81.0 (27.2)	75.3 (24.1)	102.5 (39.2)
Mean daily maximum °F (°C)	40.4 (4.7)	43.0 (6.1)	50.7 (10.4)	63.0 (17.2)	72.5 (22.5)	81.8 (27.7)	86.4 (30.2)	84.6 (29.2)	78.1 (25.6)	66.2 (19.0)	55.5 (13.1)	45.4 (7.4)	64.1 (17.8)
Daily mean °F (°C)	32.1 (0.1)	34.0 (1.1)	41.4 (5.2)	52.4 (11.3)	62.0 (16.7)	71.2 (21.8)	76.2 (24.6)	74.4 (23.6)	67.7 (19.8)	55.9 (13.3)	45.6 (7.6)	37.1 (2.8)	54.3 (12.4)
Mean daily minimum °F (°C)	23.7 (−4.6)	25.1 (−3.8)	32.0 (0.0)	41.9 (5.5)	51.5 (10.8)	60.7 (15.9)	66.1 (18.9)	64.2 (17.9)	57.3 (14.1)	45.6 (7.6)	35.7 (2.1)	28.8 (−1.8)	44.5 (6.9)
Record low °F (°C)	−10.5 (−23.6)	−3.0 (−19.4)	3.8 (−15.7)	18.1 (−7.7)	32.5 (0.3)	41.0 (5.0)	47.8 (8.8)	42.2 (5.7)	36.1 (2.3)	24.5 (−4.2)	10.8 (−11.8)	0.3 (−17.6)	−10.5 (−23.6)
Average precipitation inches (mm)	3.53 (90)	2.65 (67)	4.27 (108)	3.63 (92)	3.98 (101)	4.42 (112)	4.90 (124)	4.45 (113)	4.12 (105)	4.00 (102)	3.28 (83)	4.29 (109)	47.53 (1,207)
Average snowfall inches (cm)	7.7 (20)	8.2 (21)	3.7 (9.4)	0.1 (0.25)	0.0 (0.0)	0.0 (0.0)	0.0 (0.0)	0.0 (0.0)	0.0 (0.0)	0.1 (0.25)	0.6 (1.5)	3.6 (9.1)	23.9 (61)
Average dew point °F (°C)	21.7 (−5.7)	22.4 (−5.3)	28.1 (−2.2)	37.4 (3.0)	49.3 (9.6)	59.5 (15.3)	64.4 (18.0)	63.6 (17.6)	57.7 (14.3)	46.1 (7.8)	35.1 (1.7)	27.4 (−2.6)	42.8 (6.0)
Source 1: PRISM
Source 2: NOHRSC (Snow, 2008/2009 - 2024/2025 normals)

== Notable people ==
People who were born in, residents of, or otherwise closely associated with Hamilton Square include:

- Jim Adams (born 1969), former professional soccer player
- Conrad Daniels (born 1941), professional darts player who was active in the 1970s and 1980s
- Dan Donigan (born 1966), retired soccer forward and former head coach of Rutgers Scarlet Knights men's soccer team
- Janice Harsanyi (1929–2007), soprano singer and college professor
- Dahntay Jones (born 1980), professional basketball player, currently playing for the Indiana Pacers
- Karin Miller (born 1977), former professional tennis player
- John K. Rafferty (1938-2021), mayor of Hamilton Township from 1976 to 1999, who represented the 14th Legislative District in the New Jersey General Assembly from 1986 to 1988
- George R. Robbins (1814–1875), represented New Jersey's 2nd congressional district from 1855 to 1859
- Robert "Bobby" Smith (born 1951), retired U.S. soccer defender and National Soccer Hall of Fame member
- John Taylor (1836–1909), creator of pork roll (aka Taylor Ham)
