= John Taylor (Taylor Ham) =

American businessman and politician (1836–1909)

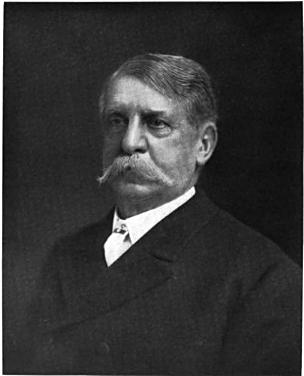
- John Taylor
- Born: October 6, 1836; Hamilton Square, New Jersey, U.S.
- Died: February 10, 1909 (aged 72); Trenton, New Jersey, U.S.
- Known for: Pork roll

John Taylor (October 6, 1836 – February 10, 1909) was an American businessman and politician who served in the New Jersey Senate. He created pork roll in 1856 and formed Taylor Provisions Company in 1888, establishing the brand "Taylor's Prepared Ham", sometimes called Taylor Ham. He also founded the Taylor Opera House in Trenton, New Jersey. Taylor Street in Trenton is also named for him.

Taylor was born in Hamilton Square, New Jersey, in 1836. His father James F. Taylor, owner of a brick yard, died when John was fourteen. Taylor entered the grocery business as a store clerk at seventeen. He quickly earned an interest with his company but left after a year to form his own partnership with James Ronan, which lasted for two years before Taylor bought Ronan's share. From 1860 through 1870, he worked in the wholesale grocery business in association with D.P. Forst. Shortly thereafter, Taylor began working in the pork and cattle packaging industry. This enterprise was organized into the Taylor Provision Company in 1888.

Taylor was a Republican active in Trenton's City Council, where he served as chairman of the finance committee. He was elected to the New Jersey Senate for Mercer County, serving from 1880 to 1883. He declined a second term. He helped to abolish the street markets of New Jersey, and organized the Inter-State Fair in 1888.

In 1860, he married Catherine Rowley who later bore him two sons: Harry C., born in September 1864, and William T., October 1869. He is buried in Riverview Cemetery in Trenton.
