= William J. Archinal =

Medal of Honor recipient (1840–1919)

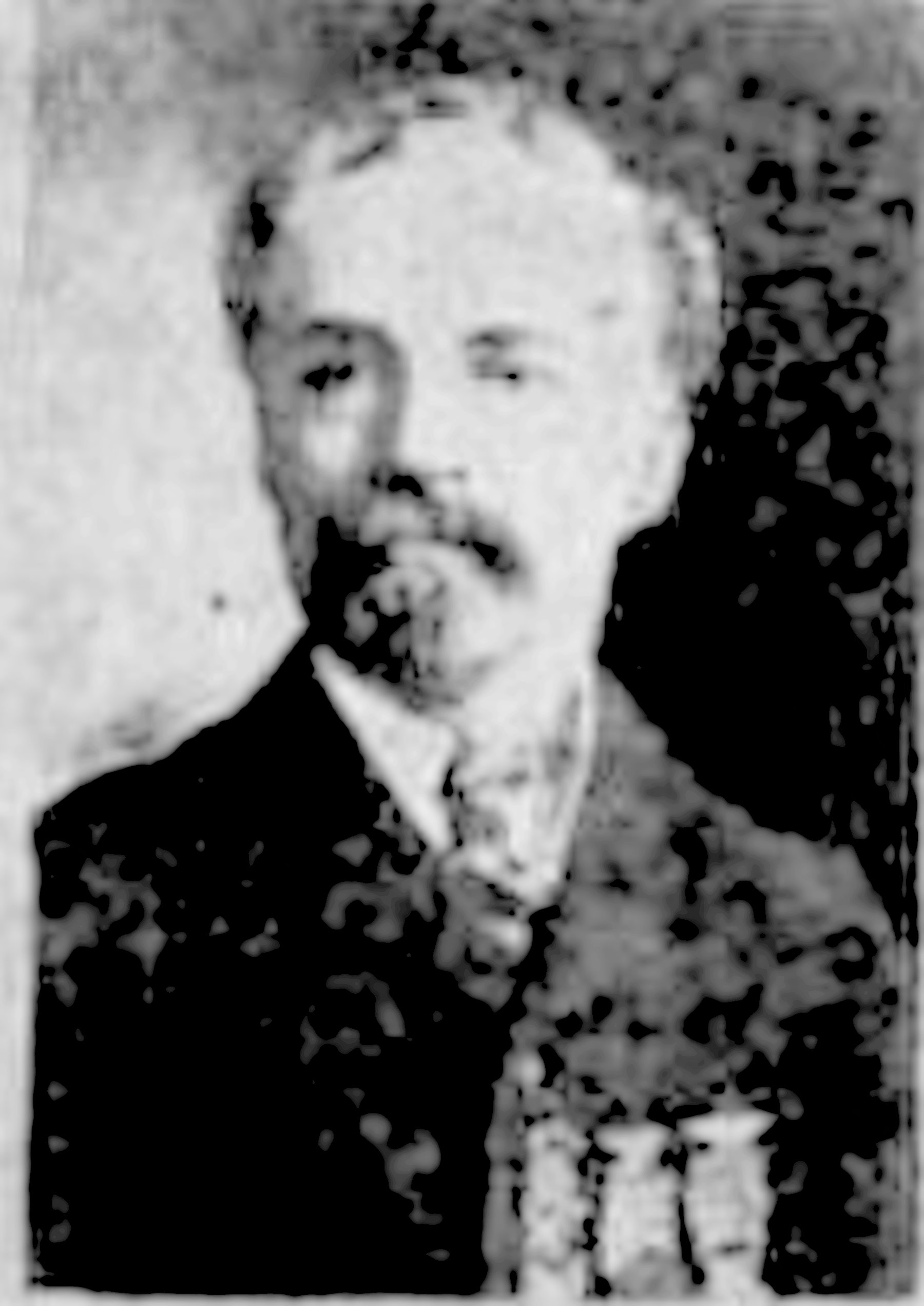
- Medal of Honor recipient
- Born: June 3, 1840; Felsberg, Schwalm-Eder-Kreis, Grand Duchy of Hesse
- Died: May 10, 1919 (aged 78); Trenton, New Jersey
- Military career
- Allegiance: United States of America; Union
- Branch: United States Army; Union Army
- Service years: 1861 - 1865
- Rank: Corporal
- Units: 30th Regiment Ohio Volunteer Infantry, Company I
- Conflicts: American Civil War; *Battle of Vicksburg
- Awards: Medal of Honor

William J. Archinal (June 3, 1840 – May 10, 1919) was an American Civil War Union Army soldier who received the Medal of Honor for his actions at the Battle of Vicksburg.

== Biography ==
Archinal enlisted in the 30th Regiment Ohio Volunteer Infantry in August 1861, becoming a Corporal in Company I. On May 22, 1863, during the campaign to capture Vicksburg, Mississippi, he participated in an assault on Confederate positions that was considered a "forlorn hope", meaning the soldiers taking part in it would have little chance of surviving. Corporal Archinal was indeed one of a relatively small number of men to escape alive. Fifty-three of the survivors were eventually awarded the Medal of Honor for their participation, including Archinal and eight other members of the 30th Ohio.

Archinal's Medal was issued on July 10, 1894, and the citation is below. William Archinal died at age 78 and was buried in Riverview Cemetery, Trenton, New Jersey. His grave can be found in section W, Lot 126. In November 2005 a government issue Medal of Honor marker was installed at his gravesite.

== Medal of Honor citation ==
Rank and organization: Corporal, Company I, 30th Ohio Infantry. Place and date: At Vicksburg, Miss., May 22, 1863. Entered service at: ------. Birth: Germany. Date of issue: July 10, 1894.

== Obituary ==
Trenton Evening Times, Date: 5-10-1919, Pg.5: WM J ARCHINAL-DEAD AT 79 YEARS: William J Archinal 79 years old of 18 North Overbrook Avenue, died today following a short illness. He had not been in health, however for two years. The funeral will be held Tuesday afternoon at 2 o'clock, from his residence. Interment will be in Riverview Cemetery, under direction of Irvins and Taylor. Mr Archinal was at one time postmaster of Canton, Ohio. He removed from Canton to this city several years ago, and since that time lived retired. He was a veteran of the Civil War and member of a local post, G A R. He was also connected with the Masonic fraternities. Aside from his widow, two sons William Archinal of this city, Harry Archinal of Canton, Ohio and one daughter Mrs Frederick Drane of New York City survive.

Citation:

Gallantry in the charge of the "volunteer storming party."

== See also ==
- List of American Civil War Medal of Honor recipients: A–F
- Battle of Vicksburg
- 30th Regiment Ohio Volunteer Infantry
