= William H. Longshore =

American Civil War soldier

- Born: February 18, 1841; Muskingum County, Ohio
- Died: December 20, 1909 (aged 68)
- Military career
- Allegiance: United States of America; Union
- Branch: United States Army; Union Army
- Rank: Private
- Units: Company D, 30th Ohio Infantry
- Conflicts: American Civil War
- Awards: Medal of Honor

William H. Longshore (February 18, 1841 – December 20, 1909) was a Private in the Union Army and a Medal of Honor recipient for his actions in the American Civil War.

== Medal of Honor citation ==
Rank and organization: Private, Company D, 30th Ohio Infantry. Place and date: At Vicksburg, Miss., May 22, 1863. Entered service at: ------. Birth: Muskingum County, Ohio. Date of issue: August 10, 1894.

Citation:

Gallantry in the charge of the "volunteer storming party."

== See also ==
- List of American Civil War Medal of Honor recipients: G–L
