= Taylor Opera House =

Historical New Jersey Opera House

Coordinates: 40.2196°N 74.7638°W

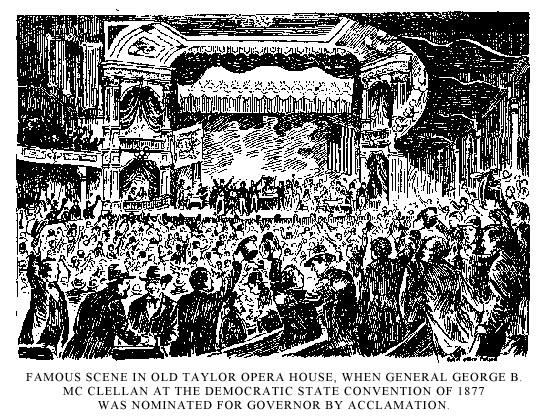
Democratic State Convention of 1877 at the Opera House

Taylor Opera House was an opera house in Trenton, New Jersey. It was the city's first theater, and was founded by John Taylor, creator of Pork Roll and one of Trenton's leading citizens. The building first opened March 18, 1867 at 18 S. Broad Street. A historical marker was placed on the site after its demolition.

The theater presented the major speakers and performers of the day, including Mark Twain, Ethel Barrymore, and George M. Cohan, and played host to political conventions, Bible conferences, musical revues and local meetings and events. It hosted the inaugurations of Governor George B. McClellan in 1877, and Woodrow Wilson in 1910, James F. Fielder in 1914 and Walter Evans Edge in 1917.

In 1921, it was converted into a movie and vaudeville palace known as Keith's Capitol Theatre; after later sales it was renamed first the RKO Capitol Theatre followed by RKO International.

The theater was razed by its next door neighbor (the Trenton Saving Fund Society) to create a parking lot in 1969.

A mural that was originally displayed at the opera house was rediscovered after a search began in 2021. Painted by George Matthews Harding in 1921 titled, "Washington Crossing the Delaware", the 16x10 foot painting was lost after it was put into storage having been deemed too large to display at another museum.
