= MindaNews =

Online newspaper in the Philippines

- Format: Online
- Owner: Mindanao Institute of Journalism
- Editor-in-chief: Bobby Timonera
- Founded: May 25, 2001
- Language: English
- City: Davao City
- Country: Philippines
- Website: www.mindanews.com

MindaNews is an online newspaper based in Davao City, Philippines which focuses on Mindanao-related affairs. It is owned by the Mindanao Institute of Journalism (MinJourn).

== History ==
Based in Davao City, MindaNews is among the first news outlets to establish presence online. They began sending news stories and photographs to prospect readers via email on May 25, 2001. In May 2002, the MindaNews website went online. MindaNews gained traction when the Battle of the Buliok Complex occurred in February 2003.

MindaNews is established by Mindanao-based journalists whose stated goal is to provide "unbiased perspective" in the island's affairs; with stories regarding the region influenced by Manila-based editors who have a view that Mindanao is a war-torn region.

== Editor-in-chiefs ==
Name	Tenure	Ref.
Carolyn Arguillas	2001–2010	
H. Marcos Moderno	2010–2013	
Carolyn Arguillas	2013–May 31, 2023	
Bobby Timonera	June 1, 2023–present	
