= Bennet Van Syckel =

American judge (1830–1921)

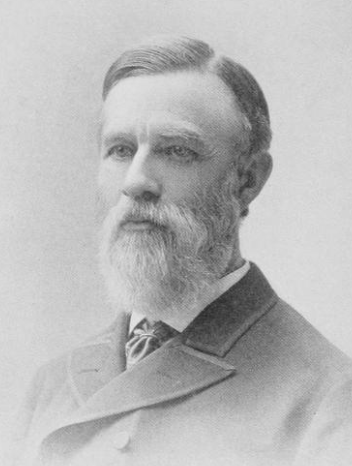

Justice of the New Jersey Supreme Court
- In office 1869–1904

Personal details
- Born: April 17, 1830 Bethlehem Township, New Jersey, US
- Died: December 19, 1921 (aged 91) Trenton, New Jersey, US
- Resting place: Riverview Cemetery
- Education: Princeton University

Bennet Van Syckel (April 17, 1830 – December 19, 1921) was an associate justice of the New Jersey Supreme Court from 1869 to 1904.

== Biography ==
Van Syckel was born on April 17, 1830, in Bethlehem Township, New Jersey, the son of Aaron Van Syckel and Mary (née Bird).

He graduated Princeton University in 1846 and was the oldest living member of his class when he died. He was admitted to bar and in 1851 began his practice in Flemington.

He served as Justice of Supreme Court of the New Jersey from 1869 to 1904.

He died December 19, 1921, and was interred at Riverview Cemetery in Trenton, where he resided.

== See also ==
- New Jersey Court of Errors and Appeals
- Courts of New Jersey
- List of justices of the Supreme Court of New Jersey
