= Hatfield Quality Meats =

Pork products manufacturer based in Pennsylvania USA

Hatfield Meats is primarily a pork meat packing company based in Hatfield, Pennsylvania. It produces over 1,200 different fresh and manufactured pork products. Hatfield's distribution is primarily on the U.S. East Coast, and several international markets.

Hatfield hot dogs are sold at Philadelphia Phillies and Washington Nationals baseball home games.

== Products ==
The company is a manufacturer and supplier of over 1,200 fresh and manufactured pork products. These include a variety of pork-based foods such as: bacon, ham, hot dogs, sausage, pork tenderloin, pork roasts, deli meat, scrapple, and pork rolls.

== History ==
=== 19th century ===
The company was founded as Pleasant Valley Packing by John C. Clemens, who initially sold meat from his farm in Mainland, Pennsylvania to markets in Philadelphia.

In 1895, J. M. Funk started Hatfield in 1895 as a pork processing plant in Hatfield, Pennsylvania.

=== 20th century ===
John S. and Abe Clemens, two of John C.'s sons, ran Pleasant Valley Packing until it burned down in 1946. The two Clemens brothers then purchased the Hatfield plant with their brothers, Ezra and Lester.

The company has been owned and controlled by the Clemens family ever since through the private Clemens Family Corporation, which operates primarily through the Clemens Food Group. The Hatfield manufacturing operation remains non-union.

=== 21st century ===
The current president is Douglas Clemens. The current CEO and chairman of the board is Philip Clemens.
