= Carolyn Arguillas =

Carolyn O. Arguillas is a Filipina journalist and peace advocate from Mindanao best known as the founding editor of Mindanews, for her early contributions as a member of the "Mosquito Press" during the Marcos dictatorship when she wrote for Veritas Newsmagazine and the Manila Chronicle, and for her pioneering the field of peace journalism in the Philippines, covering both the Bangsamoro peace process and the peace process for the CPP-NPA-NDF conflict particularly in Mindanao.

Among the many awards she has received as a journalist are the Catholic Mass Media Awards for Best News Reporting, the Jaime V. Ongpin Awards for Investigative Journalism, the Lifetime Achievement Awards from the Titus Brandsma-Philippines, the Marshall McLuhan Prize from the Canadian Embassy, Gawad AKAp Peace Awards, and the Glory Award for Journalism. In 2023, she was also awarded the Luxembourg Peace Prize, which honors individuals who are considered “outstanding in the field of peace.”

== See also ==
- Mindanews
- Bangsamoro peace process
- Journalism during the Marcos dictatorship
