= Taylor Provisions =

Meat producer in New Jersey

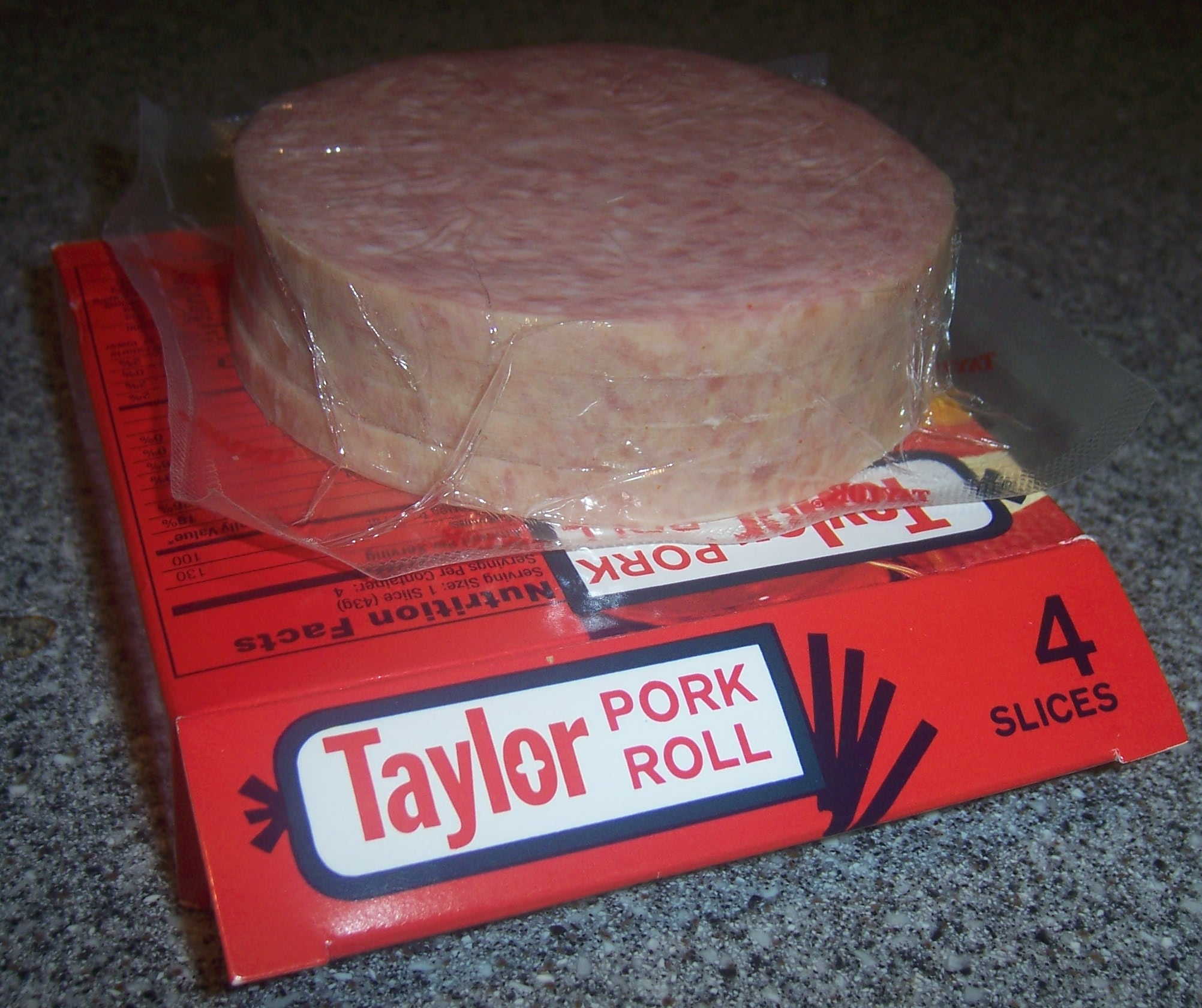
A four-slice box of pork roll produced by Taylor Provisions

Taylor Provisions is a leading producer of pork roll, based in Trenton, New Jersey. Its founder, John Taylor, is credited as the inventor of the pork roll, originally calling it "Taylor's Prepared Ham." The nickname "Taylor Ham" has persisted despite no longer being designated as "ham" by the company.

== Products ==
Taylor Provisions Company produces pork-based products. The primary brand focuses on a processed pork originating in New Jersey called pork roll. Some pork roll "still comes in a sewn cloth wrapper, like a real sausage".

== Company history ==
John Taylor is credited with creating his secret recipe for the product in 1856.

John Taylor and his son William formed Taylor Provision Company in 1888. The company was regarded as "one of the most important of Trenton's commercial interests". By 1894, sales revenue was grossing $200,000. Taylor originally released the product under the name "Taylor's Prepared Ham", but was forced to change the name after it failed to meet the new legal definition of "ham" established by the Pure Food and Drug Act of 1906. Other pork roll products with similar names started competing against Taylor. They were labelled as "Rolled Pork" or "Trenton style Pork Roll".

The company peaked its Jersey Shore operations during the 1950s owning "eight sandwich shops, including three in Atlantic City, two in Cape May and one each at Wildwood, Seaside and Asbury Park. The last shop standing was the one in Cape May that closed when the operator retired in the early 1980s". The company operates on Perrine Avenue in Trenton, New Jersey.
