= Mercerville-Hamilton Square, New Jersey =

Populated place in Mercer County, New Jersey, US

- Former census-designated place
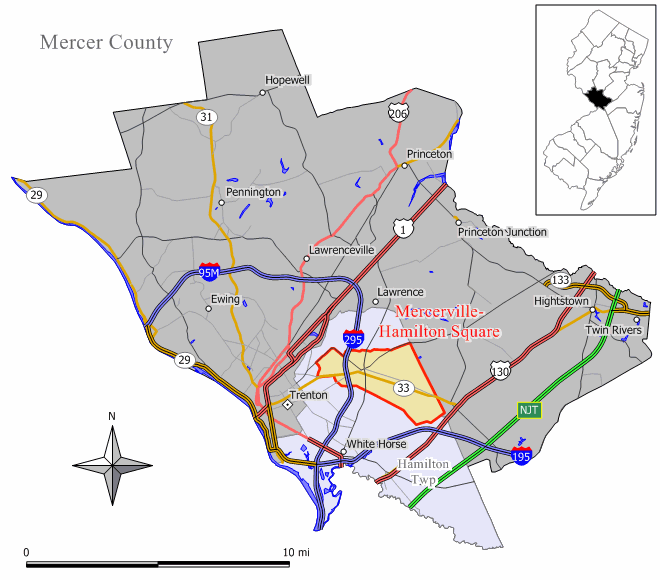
- Map of the former Mercerville-Hamilton Square CDP in Mercer County. Inset: Location of Mercer County in New Jersey.
- Coordinates: 40°13′52″N 74°40′31″W
- Country: United States
- State: New Jersey
- County: Mercer
- Township: Hamilton

Area
  - Total: 7.7 sq mi (20.0 km^{2})
  - Land: 7.7 sq mi (20.0 km^{2})
  - Water: 0 sq mi (0.0 km^{2})

Population (2000 census)
  - Total: 26,419
  - Density: 3,429/sq mi (1,323.8/km^{2})
- Time zone: UTC−05:00 (Eastern (EST))
  - Summer (DST): UTC−04:00 (Eastern (EDT))
- FIPS code: 3445495

Mercerville-Hamilton Square is a census-designated place and unincorporated community located within Hamilton Township, in Mercer County, in the U.S. state of New Jersey. As of the 2000 United States census, the CDP's population was 26,419. As part of the 2010 census, the area was split into two CDPs, Mercerville and Hamilton Square.

== History ==
There are a number of historical markers in Mercerville, many detailing the path of the Continental Army under the command of George Washington through the area during the American Revolutionary War, especially related to the night march from the Second Battle of Trenton to the Battle of Princeton.

Originally called "Sandtown," Mercerville is named after General Hugh Mercer who died on January 12, 1777, due to wounds incurred at the Battle of Princeton. Hamilton Square was named after Alexander Hamilton in a wave of anti-British sentiment at the time of the War of 1812. It previously had been called Nottingham after the British town.

=== Historic places ===
- Isaac Watson House was built in 1708 on a bluff overlooking Watson's Creekon with the property at 800 acres (3.2 km^{2}). Located at 151 Westcott Avenue, it is the oldest house in Mercer County. The house currently serves as the New Jersey State Society DAR Headquarters. The house is on the National Register of Historic Places.
- John Abbott II House was built in 1730 by John Abbott. It is located at 2200 Kuser Rd. on the North side of Crosswicks Creek in near Veterans Park. The house is noted as being a secret repository for funds hidden from British as they advanced on Trenton in 1776. The funds were stored by John Abbott II for state treasurer Samuel Tucker inside a tub containing broken crockery. In 1969 the house was to be razed to the ground but was saved by the Hamilton Township Historical Society. The house is on the National Register.
- Isaac Pearson House was built in 1733. Isaac Pearson was elected several times to the state assembly, served on the General Committee of Correspondence appointed by the Provincial Assembly July 21, 1774, and first Committee of Safety October 1775. Pearson was killed by robbers or was suspected as having collaborated with the British and killed by Continentals. This house is listed on the New Jersey Register of Historic Places.

== Geography ==
According to the United States Census Bureau, the Mercerville-Hamilton Square CDP had a total area of 20.0 km^{2} (7.7 sq mi), all of it land.

== Demographics ==
Historical population
Census	Pop.	Note	%±
1970	24,465		—
1980	25,446		4.0%
1990	26,873		5.6%
2000	26,419		−1.7%
sources: 1970–1980; 1950 1960 1970; 1980 1990 2000; 2010

Mercerville-Hamilton Square first appeared as an unincorporated community in the 1970 U.S. census; and then was listed as a census designated place in the 1980 U.S. census.

=== 2000 census ===
As of the 2000 United States census there were 26,419 people, 9,403 households, and 7,362 families residing in the CDP. The population density was 1,323.0 people/km^{2} (3,427 people/mi^{2}). There were 9,539 housing units at an average density of 477.7 units/km^{2} (1,237 units/mi^{2}). The racial makeup of the CDP was 94.14% White, 1.45% African American, 0.13% Native American, 2.52% Asian, 0.01% Pacific Islander, 0.78% from other races, and 0.96% from two or more races. Hispanic or Latino of any race were 2.54% of the population.

There were 9,403 households, out of which 33.6% had children under the age of 18 living with them, 67.5% were married couples living together, 7.8% had a female householder with no husband present, and 21.7% were non-families. 18.4% of all households were made up of individuals, and 9.8% had someone living alone who was 65 years of age or older. The average household size was 2.74 and the average family size was 3.14.

In the CDP the population was spread out, with 23.3% under the age of 18, 6.2% from 18 to 24, 27.4% from 25 to 44, 25.9% from 45 to 64, and 17.1% who were 65 years of age or older. The median age was 41 years. For every 100 females, there were 91.5 males. For every 100 females age 18 and over, there were 88.0 males.

The median income for a household in the CDP was $67,896, and the median income for a family was $75,559 (these figures had risen to $86,169 and $98,908 respectively as of a 2007 estimate). Males had a median income of $52,163 versus $35,182 for females. The per capita income for the CDP was $27,080. About 1.7% of families and 2.2% of the population were below the poverty line, including 2.0% of those under age 18 and 3.4% of those age 65 or over.

== Education ==
Most high school students in Mercerville attend Nottingham High School while Hamilton Square high school students attend Steinert High School.
