= Pork roll =

Processed pork common in New Jersey, US

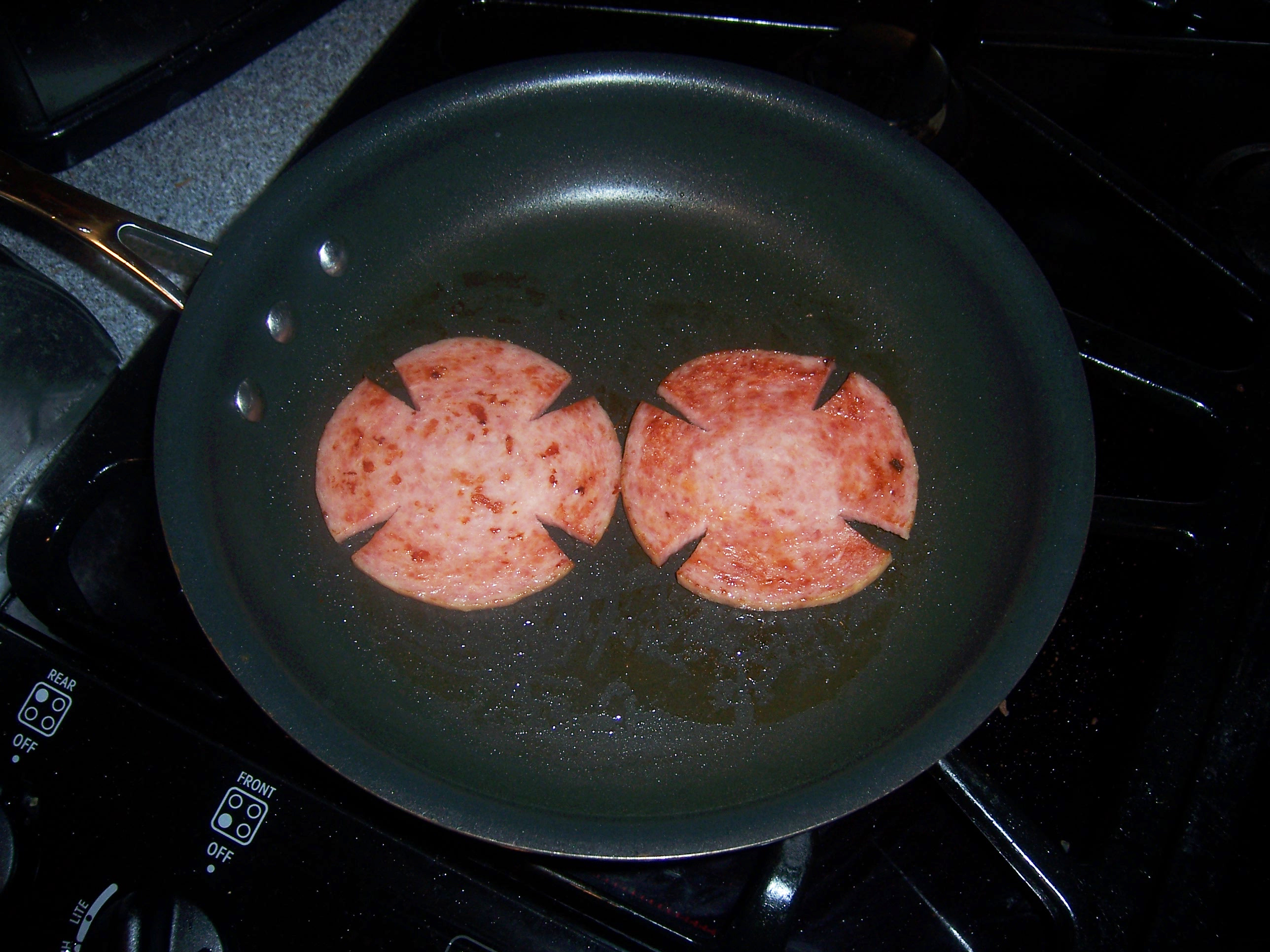
Two slices of pork roll, frying in a pan

Pork roll is a processed meat commonly available in New Jersey and neighboring states. It was developed in 1856 by John Taylor of Trenton, and sold as "Taylor's Prepared Ham" until 1906. Although since then food labeling regulations require Taylor and all other manufacturers to label it "pork roll", people in northern New Jersey still refer to it as "Taylor ham". The "Is it pork roll or Taylor ham?" question is a notable element of New Jersey culture, and the division over what name one uses divides the state along roughly north–south geographic regions.

== Origin ==
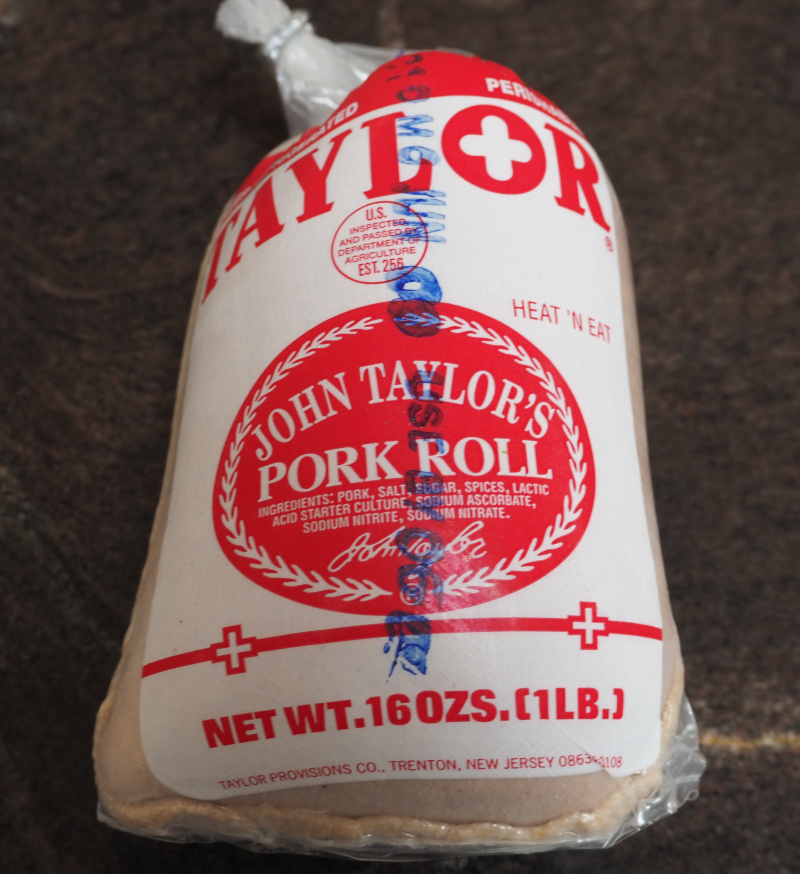
A 1 pound (0.45 kg) sack of Taylor Pork Roll, the smallest size un-sliced package available. Smaller in diameter than the typical pre-sliced product.

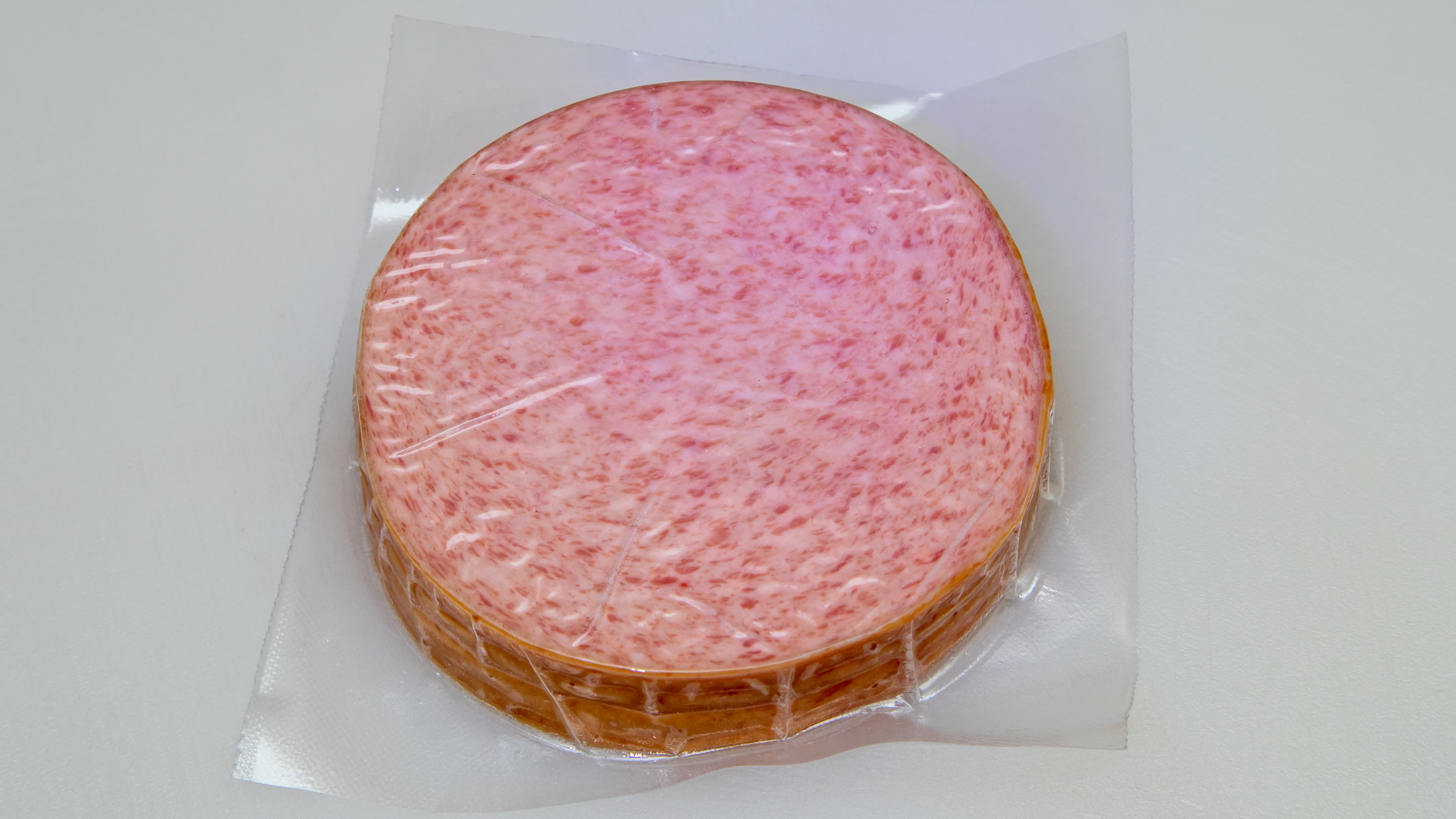
A typical 6 oz. vacuum-sealed package of sliced pork roll. 9 pounds (4.1 kg) mail order boxes of sliced pork roll contain roughly 144 slices.

Food preservation techniques, such as salting and smoking meat, have been practiced for millennia. Evidence of traditional ham and sausage production dates back more than 2,000 years. An item resembling pork roll, packed minced ham, may have been locally produced in the later 1700s.

John Taylor is credited with creating his secret recipe for the product in 1856. George Washington Case, a farmer and butcher from nearby Belle Mead, created his own recipe for hickory-smoked pork roll in 1870. Case's was reportedly packaged in corn husks.

Following the Civil War, in the later 1800s, the American meat-packing industry experienced dramatic growth, bringing meat products like pork roll to rapidly growing urban areas.

== Description ==
Being both a regional specialty and a processed meat with a unique taste, pork roll has resisted accurate description and is sometimes referred to as a mystery meat. It contains lightly smoked pork, salt, preservative, and spices. The exact recipes, both Taylor's and Case's, have remained trade secrets.

The 1910 legal opinion which established "pork roll" as a generic term described the product as:

a food article made of pork, packed in a cylindrical cotton sack or bag in such form that it could be quickly prepared for cooking by slicing without removal from the bag.

— Chatfield, District Judge

Both the "cylindrical cotton sack" and vacuum-sealed sliced forms are widely available in the region. Loeffler's Gourmet sold a "Pork Roll Links" product under its Mercer Meats brand, which was in essence a hot dog made of pork roll. For some time, Taylor also made "Taystrips", which was the same kind of meat, but shaped into rectangular strips, similar to bacon or Sizzlean.

Larry Olmsted of USA Today has described the taste of the meat as "a cross between Canadian bacon and bacon, less hammy and smoky than Canadian, fattier and saltier than bacon, with a unique texture, both crispy and slightly mushy." Bryson and Haynie wrote "Think Spam, but pork roll is leaner, has a hint of smoke, subtly different spices — and it doesn't have the goo or come in a can."

== Preparation ==
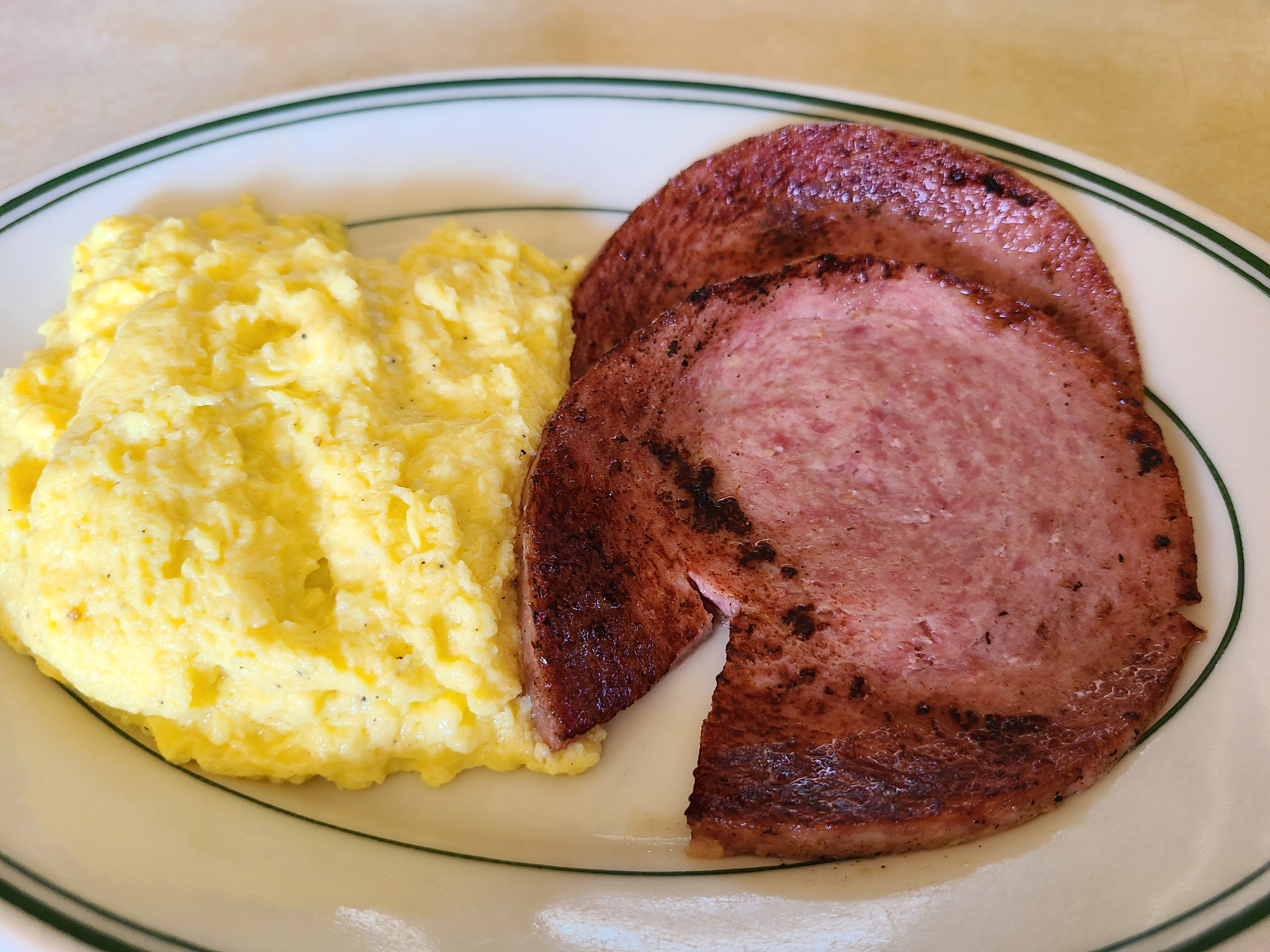
Pork roll served at a diner in Biddeford, Maine

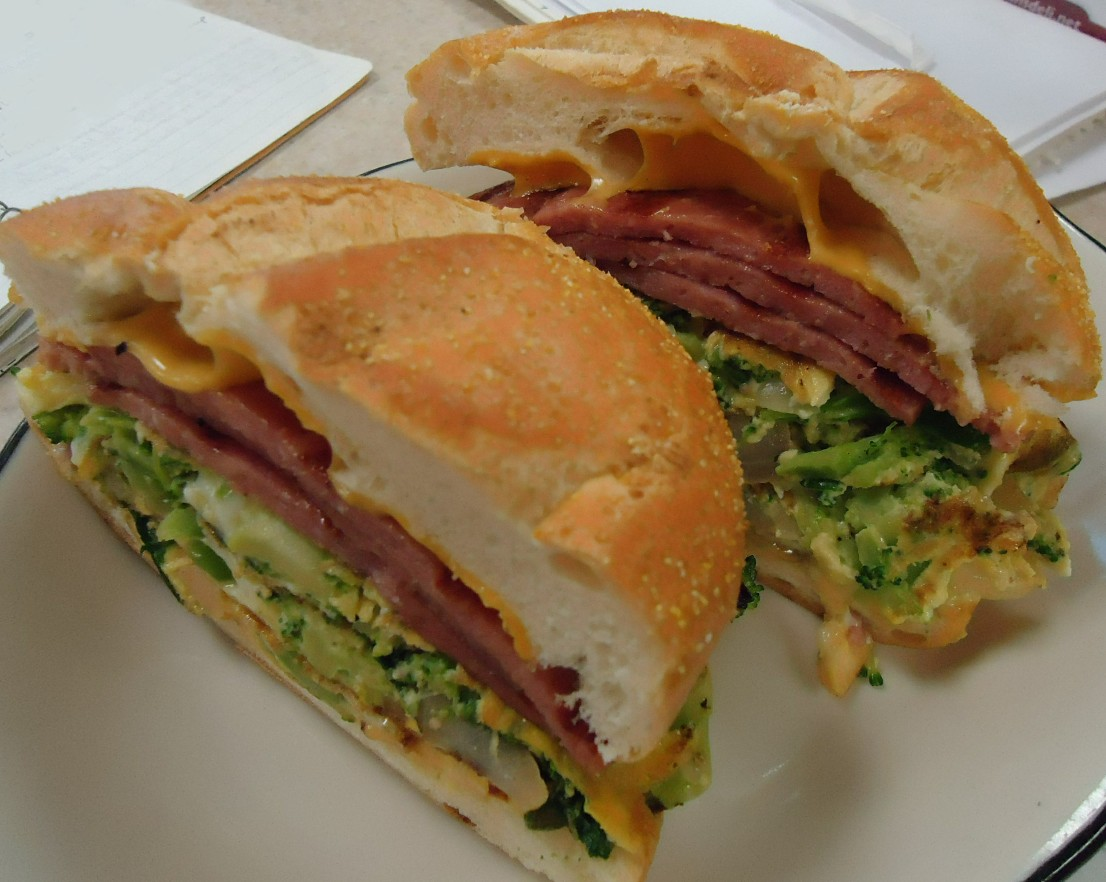
A sandwich featuring pork roll at a delicatessen in New Jersey

Pork roll is prepared by slicing it, if it is not already sliced, and then pan frying or otherwise heating up the slices.

Slices of pork roll naturally curl up into a cup shape as they are heated. To make the slices lie flat, a single radial cut (Pac-Man style) or four inward cuts (fireman's badge style) are commonly made, leading to distinctive shapes once cooked.

=== Consumption ===
Pork roll is commonly eaten as part of a sandwich and frequently paired with egg and/or cheese. A popular breakfast sandwich in the region is the "Taylor ham, egg and cheese" a.k.a. "pork roll, egg and cheese" in which fried pork roll is joined with a fried (or scrambled) egg and American cheese and served on a hard roll, bagel, or English muffin.

It also presented as an alternative to more common breakfast meats, such as bacon, ham, or breakfast sausage. As such, it is sometimes served on its own as a side dish, or incorporated into other dishes which make use of breakfast meats. For example, a Taylor ham burger, a.k.a. a "Jersey Burger", substitutes pork roll for the bacon in a bacon burger. Similarly, a "PRLT" or "THLT" uses pork roll instead of bacon on a BLT sandwich and a pork roll Monte Cristo substitutes pork roll for the ham.

== Names of the product ==
Taylor originally called his product "Taylor's Prepared Ham", but was forced to change the name after it failed to meet the new legal definition of "ham" established by the Pure Food and Drug Act of 1906.

Marketed as both "Taylor's Pork Roll" and "Trenton Pork Roll", it saw competition from products with similar names like "Rolled Pork" and "Trenton style Pork Roll". Adolph Gobel, the "Sausage King" of Brooklyn, was sued by Taylor in 1910 for calling his competing product "Roll of Pork", but the court ruled that the words "Pork Roll" and "Roll of Pork" could not be trademarked.

=== New Jersey split over the name ===
Although it says "John Taylor's Pork Roll" on the wrapper of the product of the Taylor Provisions Company, a century later, many in North Jersey continue to use the term "Taylor ham". The debate over the name, which splits New Jersey along a line between the north and the south, is a perennial one in the state. It has become a shibboleth for identity within the state. A 2016 reader poll including more than 70,000 respondents from all 565 municipalities across New Jersey found that the dividing line straddled the Union–Middlesex county border in the east and followed Interstate 78 through the middle of Somerset and Hunterdon counties in the west.

On May 15, 2016, President Barack Obama gave a commencement speech at Rutgers University's 250th graduation ceremony in which he referenced the "Taylor Ham vs. pork roll debate", saying, "I come here for a simple reason – to finally settle this pork roll vs. Taylor Ham question...I'm just kidding...There's not much I'm afraid to take on in my final year of office, but I know better than to get in the middle of that debate."

A 2014 survey of restaurant menus by documentary filmmaker Steve Chernoski found that the north–south dividing line was not quite as characterized, with restaurants in Monmouth County using the name "Taylor ham", which Chernoski hypothesized was the result of either northerners moving to beachfront properties, or restaurants catering to their tourist markets; a "Down the Shore Taylor Ham" product being sold south of Driscoll Bridge; and the main split being further south than Chernoski expected it to be, in Somerset and Middlesex Counties around the Raritan River.

Further confounding the debate is the fact that items sold in restaurants as "Taylor ham" are not necessarily the Taylor product, because it has suffered from a degree of genericization, and even in northern New Jersey are likely to be in fact a pork roll product of Case or another company. For example, any pork roll sandwich bought in any Wawa store is made from pork roll manufactured by Alderfer.

== Producers ==
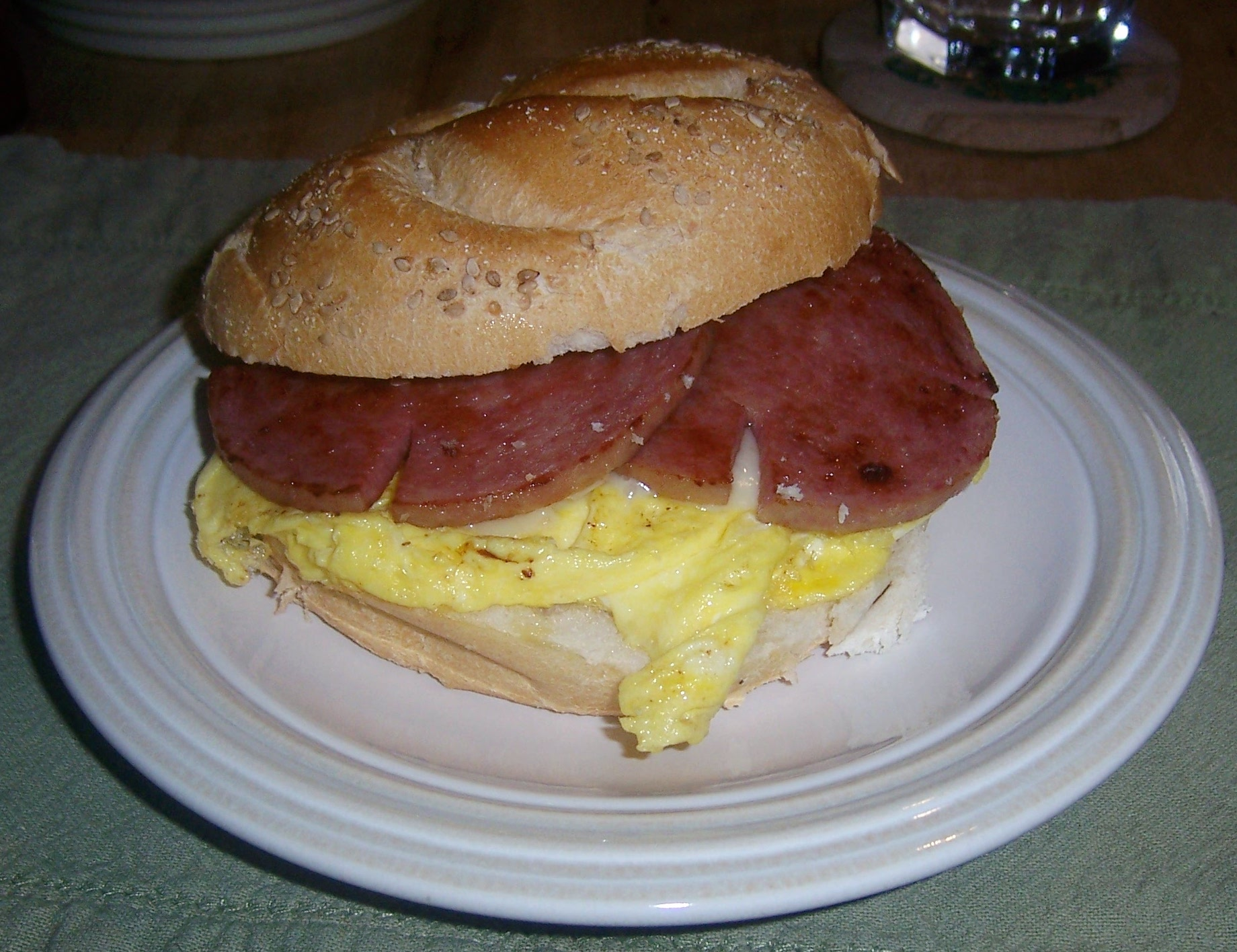
A "Jersey Breakfast" of pork roll, egg, and cheese on a hard roll

The main producers of pork roll in New Jersey are Taylor Provisions (USDA EST 256), branded as Taylor and Trenton, and Case Pork Roll (USDA EST 184), branded as Case's. Both these two have their headquarters in Trenton.

Other smaller producers include Spolem Provisions (USDA EST 5421) branded as Loeffler's Gourmet and Mercer Meats, Clemens Food Group (USDA EST 791) as Hatfield, Leidys (USDA EST 9520) as Leidy's and Alderfer, and Rob-Dave Distributors (USDA EST 2159) as Johnston.

Both Loeffler/Spoelm and Johnston House/Rob-Dave are produced in Hamilton Township, which borders Trenton. Loeffler Gourmet is a small business that got into selling pork roll in 2003, after its manager Robert Trofimowicz, a Polish immigrant, and his parents had been running a Polish delicatessen named Henry's Deli in Hamilton. Originally one of the delicatessen's suppliers, Trofimowicz bought the business and started marketing its pork roll. As of 2012, it was contracting with 300 of New Jersey's school districts for supply of pork roll. Johnston House Brand Pork Roll is produced from a family butcher's shop near Allentown, New Jersey, and is named for the avenue in Hamilton where the owners' family previously ran a butcher shop.

Clemens/Hatfield and Leidy/Alderfelder are based in nearby Pennsylvania, approximately 30 miles west of Trenton. Their products are named specifically a "Pork Roll Sausage", adding the word "sausage", because of food labeling laws.

There is an industry of delivering pork roll by mail order from New Jersey to the rest of the United States, as it is little known and otherwise not readily obtainable outside New Jersey and neighboring Pennsylvania, with companies ranging from "The Taylor Ham Man" through "Jersey Pork Roll" to "Case's Pork Roll Store".

== In popular culture ==
Many people from New Jersey have strong feelings for the product. It rivals their feelings about pizza or bagels, but unlike those foods, pork roll is a food that is highly specific to the state. When food writer Peter Genovese wrote an article entitled the 10 Most Overrated Things about New Jersey and put pork roll on the list, saying merely that it was overrated, he received a large amount of negative feedback from readers.

=== Festivals ===
There have been multiple festivals celebrating pork roll in Trenton. The first of six annual Pork Roll Festivals was held on May 24, 2014. A 7th was scheduled for 2020, but was delayed and ultimately cancelled due to the COVID pandemic.

At the first festival, held at Trenton Social bar and restaurant, hundreds of pounds of pork roll were served to over 4,000 visitors and a Miss Pork Roll Queen was crowned. Pre-ordered supplies for sandwich making ran out partway through the event, and Tom Dolan, the president of Case Pork Roll, personally delivered a further 20 cases of pork roll to keep vendors supplied. The organizers had spent a total of $50 on advertising, the publicity being mainly through Facebook posts and word of mouth.

The following year, the organizers split up over a disagreement as to where the festival was to be held and whether Trenton Social was large enough to accommodate the expected visitor numbers, and held competing festivals. The renamed Trenton Pork Roll Festival remained at Trenton Social, whilst the originally named Pork Roll Festival was held in Mill Hill Park. Both rivals were still going in 2016.

A Vegan Pork Roll Festival was held in 2015, on the same day as the other two, in Gandhi Garden on Trenton's East Hanover Street.

=== Eating contest ===
In 2015, the inaugural edition of The Trenton Thunder World Famous Case's Pork Roll Eating Championship was held. This is an Major League Eating sanctioned competitive eating event. Joey Chestnut won the first contest, eating 32 4 oz sandwiches in 10 minutes. In 2024, Geoff Esper, James Webb, and Nick Wehry competed, eating over 40 sandwiches each. As of 2025, the annual contest continues.

=== State sandwich ===
Unofficially, many residents of New Jersey regard the "Taylor ham/pork roll, egg, and cheese" as the state sandwich.

On April 14, 2016, Assemblyman Tim Eustace introduced two bills in the New Jersey State Legislature seeking to make this official, designating it the New Jersey State Sandwich. One bill was for pork roll and one for Taylor Ham. Neither bill made it out of committee.

On May 25, 2023, New Jersey governor Phil Murphy declared the official sandwich of New Jersey to be the "Taylor Swift Ham, Egg, and Cheese" in honor of Taylor Swift's Eras Tour coming to East Rutherford's Metlife Stadium in the following weekend.

=== Others ===
On Fridays in 2018, the Trenton Thunder minor league baseball team rebranded itself as "Thunder Pork Roll" with pork roll themed uniforms and merchandise.

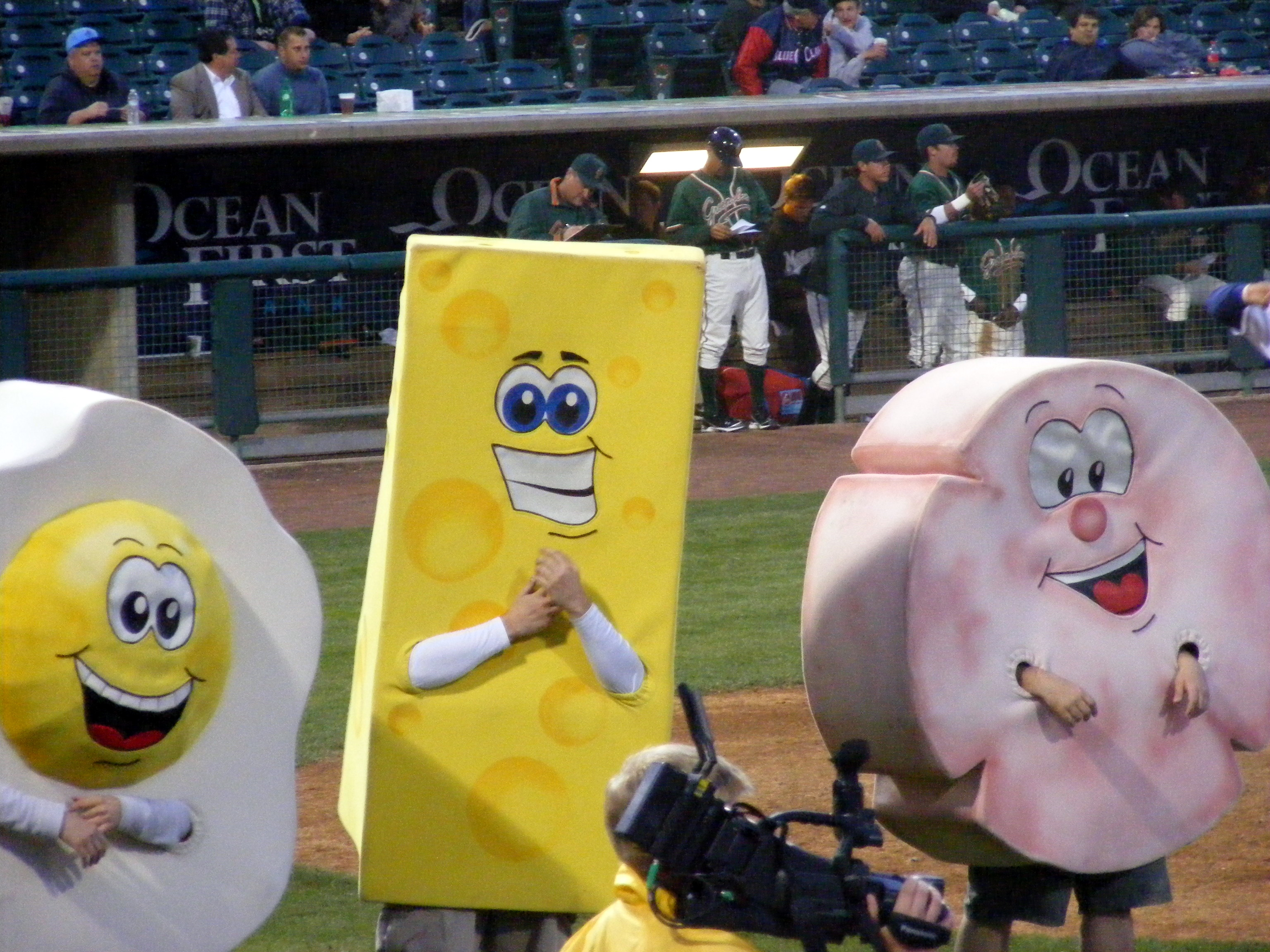
Pork roll, Egg & Cheese race at a Blue Claws game

The Jersey Shore BlueClaws minor league baseball team holds a Pork Roll, Egg, and Cheese Race at the end of the fourth inning of every home game.

Several songs by the band Ween contain references to pork roll, including "Frank" and "Pork Roll Egg and Cheese" from their 1991 album The Pod. The band is from nearby New Hope, Pennsylvania.

Episode 9 from Season 7 of the television program Bizarre Foods Delicious Destinations featured pork roll as a Jersey Shore specialty.

On October 28, 2020, Montana gubernatorial candidate Mike Cooney released a video of former New Jersey governor Chris Christie on the app Cameo. Christie, who had been tricked into recording the video by a Cooney aide, invoked "Taylor ham" in an attempt to lure Cooney's opponent, Greg Gianforte, back to New Jersey.

== See also ==
- Back bacon
- Scrapple
