= Florham Park, New Jersey =

Borough in Morris County, New Jersey, US

- Borough
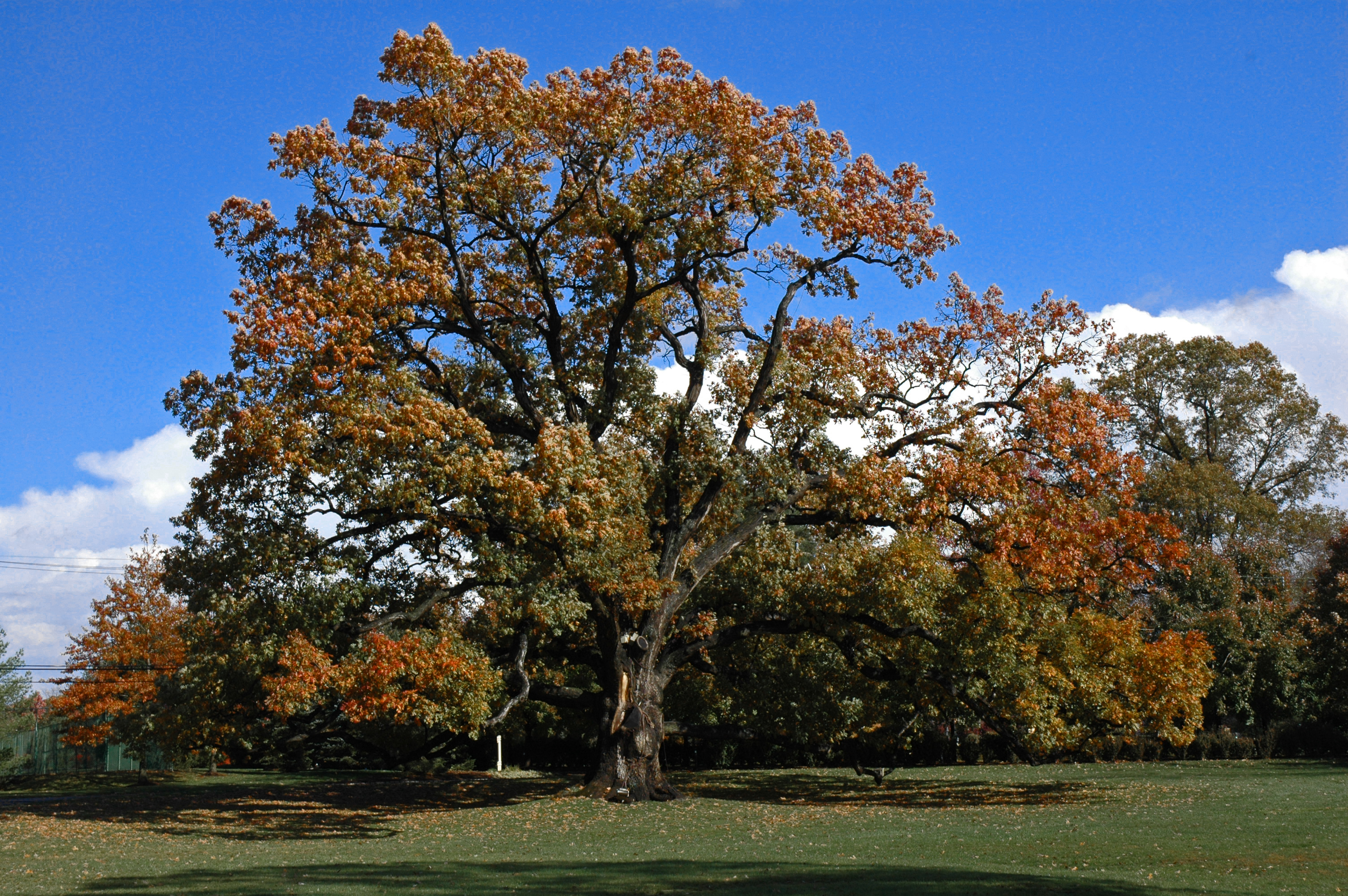
- 200-year-old oak tree at Brooklake Country Club

- Seal

- Location of Florham Park in Morris County highlighted in red (right). Inset map: Location of Morris County in New Jersey highlighted in orange (left).

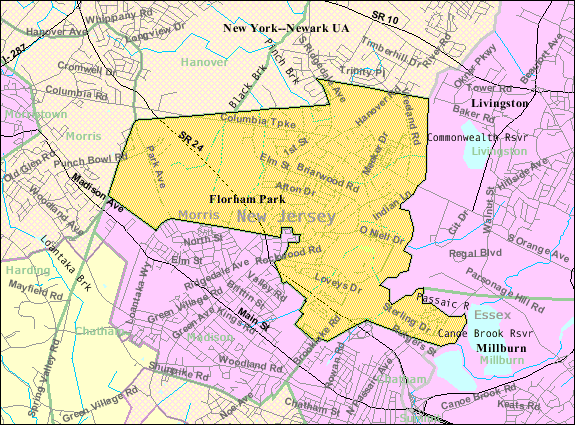
- Census Bureau map of Florham Park, New Jersey

- Location in Morris County Location in New Jersey Location in the United States
- Coordinates: 40.775992°N 74.394315°W
- Country: United States
- State: New Jersey
- County: Morris
- Incorporated: March 9, 1899
- Named for: Florham and Brooklake Park mansions

Government
  - Type: Borough
  - Body: Borough Council
  - Mayor: Mark Taylor (R, term ends December 31, 2027)
  - Administrator: William F. Huyler
  - Municipal clerk: Danielle M. Lewis

Area
  - Total: 7.48 sq mi (19.37 km^{2})
  - Land: 7.31 sq mi (18.94 km^{2})
  - Water: 0.16 sq mi (0.42 km^{2}) 2.23%
  - Rank: 236th of 565 in state 20th of 39 in county
- Elevation: 217 ft (66 m)

Population (2020)
  - Total: 12,585
  - Estimate (2024): 14,533
  - Rank: 202nd of 565 in state 16th of 39 in county
  - Density: 1,722.1/sq mi (664.9/km^{2})
  - Rank: 318th of 565 in state 16th of 39 in county
- Time zone: UTC−05:00 (Eastern (EST))
  - Summer (DST): UTC−04:00 (Eastern (EDT))
- ZIP Code: 07932
- Area code: 973
- FIPS code: 3402723910
- GNIS feature ID: 0885221
- Website: www.florhamparknj.gov

Florham Park is a borough in Morris County, in the U.S. state of New Jersey. As of the 2020 United States census, the borough's population was 12,585, its highest decennial count ever and an increase of 889 (+7.6%) from the 11,696 recorded at the 2010 census, which in turn reflected an increase of 2,839 (+32.1%) from the 8,857 counted in the 2000 census.

Florham Park was incorporated as a borough by an act of the New Jersey Legislature on March 9, 1899, from portions of Chatham Township. In 2012, Forbes.com listed Florham Park as 440th in its listing of "America's Most Expensive ZIP Codes", with a median home price of $675,107.

Since 2008, Florham Park has been the main operations headquarters for the National Football League's New York Jets.

== History ==
First occupied by the Lenape tribe of Native Americans, the area that is now Florham Park was first settled by European settlers of English and Dutch origin sometime between 1680 and 1700, and the community was long recognized as a prime farming area. The area was known for the manufacture of quality brooms, which was the source of one of its town names, Broomtown. At various times during its history, the area was known as Hoppingtown, Broomtown, Columbia, Afton, and finally Florham Park. It was part of Hanover Township, then Chatham Township before being incorporated as Florham Park in 1899.

Florence Adele Vanderbilt Twombly (1854–1952), granddaughter of Cornelius Vanderbilt, renowned as the richest man in America, and her husband, financier, Hamilton McKown Twombly, came to the Morris County countryside in 1887, joining over 100 other millionaires who owned sprawling country retreats. They fancied an English-style country mansion in a stately park setting. "Florham," built on 840 acres (3.4 km^{2}), one of America's finest Gilded Age homes, was the result. The couple named their new estate "Florham," a combination of their first names, Florence and Hamilton. The second part to the name "Florham Park" received its name from a second mansion in town that was on about 1,000 acres (4.0 km^{2}) of land situated where the current Brooklake Country Club is located. Owned by Leslie Ward—one of the founders of the Prudential Insurance Company and the first vice president of the company—it was named "Brooklake Park", partially because of the beautiful lake that was on the property.

Both of these families were supporters of many civic projects including the petitioning of the State of New Jersey to create their own municipality. After the legislature voted on March 9, 1899, the governor signed the bill on March 20, making Florham Park a borough. The new town was named after Florence and Hamilton Twombly's and Ward's estates.

== Geography ==
According to the United States Census Bureau, the borough had a total area of 7.48 square miles (19.36 km^{2}), including 7.31 square miles (18.93 km^{2}) of land and 0.17 square miles (0.43 km^{2}) of water (2.23%).

Unincorporated communities, localities and place names located partially or completely within the borough include Columbia Ridge.

The borough is located in southeastern Morris County and is bordered to the south by Madison and Chatham Boroughs; to the north by Hanover and East Hanover Townships; to the west by Morris Township; and on the east by the Passaic River where it borders Essex County communities Livingston and Millburn Townships.

As of 2026, the borough is a member of Local Leaders for Responsible Planning in order to address the borough's Mount Laurel doctrine-based housing obligations.

== Demographics ==
Historical population
Census	Pop.	Note	%±
1900	752		—
1910	558		−25.8%
1920	570		2.2%
1930	1,269		122.6%
1940	1,609		26.8%
1950	2,385		48.2%
1960	7,222		202.8%
1970	8,094		12.1%
1980	9,359		15.6%
1990	8,521		−9.0%
2000	8,857		3.9%
2010	11,696		32.1%
2020	12,585		7.6%
2024 (est.)	14,533	▲	15.5%
Population sources: 1900–1920; 1900–1910 1910–1930; 1940–2000 2000; 2010 2020

=== 2020 census ===
As of the 2020 census, Florham Park had a population of 12,585. The median age was 40.6 years. 17.6% of residents were under the age of 18 and 20.6% of residents were 65 years of age or older. For every 100 females there were 85.5 males, and for every 100 females age 18 and over there were 82.7 males age 18 and over.

100.0% of residents lived in urban areas, while 0.0% lived in rural areas.

There were 4,468 households in Florham Park, of which 29.1% had children under the age of 18 living in them. Of all households, 55.1% were married-couple households, 13.9% were households with a male householder and no spouse or partner present, and 27.2% were households with a female householder and no spouse or partner present. About 27.6% of all households were made up of individuals and 14.5% had someone living alone who was 65 years of age or older.

There were 4,768 housing units, of which 6.3% were vacant. The homeowner vacancy rate was 1.0% and the rental vacancy rate was 8.8%.

Racial composition as of the 2020 census
Race	Number	Percent
White	9,708	77.1%
Black or African American	759	6.0%
American Indian and Alaska Native	5	0.0%
Asian	1,085	8.6%
Native Hawaiian and Other Pacific Islander	9	0.1%
Some other race	250	2.0%
Two or more races	769	6.1%
Hispanic or Latino (of any race)	929	7.4%

=== 2010 census ===
The 2010 United States census counted 11,696 people, 4,003 households, and 2,798 families in the borough. The population density was 1,604.9 per square mile (619.7/km^{2}). There were 4,201 housing units at an average density of 576.4 per square mile (222.5/km^{2}). The racial makeup was 86.35% (10,099) White, 4.35% (509) Black or African American, 0.07% (8) Native American, 6.37% (745) Asian, 0.07% (8) Pacific Islander, 1.10% (129) from other races, and 1.69% (198) from two or more races. Hispanic or Latino of any race were 5.08% (594) of the population.

Of the 4,003 households, 29.8% had children under the age of 18; 58.9% were married couples living together; 8.6% had a female householder with no husband present and 30.1% were non-families. Of all households, 26.7% were made up of individuals and 13.2% had someone living alone who was 65 years of age or older. The average household size was 2.48 and the average family size was 3.03.

19.2% of the population were under the age of 18, 18.9% from 18 to 24, 20.7% from 25 to 44, 24.4% from 45 to 64, and 16.8% who were 65 years of age or older. The median age was 38.1 years. For every 100 females, the population had 83.6 males. For every 100 females ages 18 and older there were 79.4 males.

The Census Bureau's 2006–2010 American Community Survey showed that (in 2010 inflation-adjusted dollars) median household income was $106,227 (with a margin of error of +/− $10,030) and the median family income was $121,316 (+/− $8,544). Males had a median income of $92,857 (+/− $17,466) versus $61,331 (+/− $12,613) for females. The per capita income for the borough was $46,564 (+/− $4,867). About 0.5% of families and 2.2% of the population were below the poverty line, including 0.7% of those under age 18 and 7.7% of those age 65 or over.

=== 2000 census ===
As of the 2000 United States census there were 8,857 people, 3,239 households, and 2,474 families residing in the borough. The population density was 1,191.3 inhabitants per square mile (460.0/km^{2}). There were 3,342 housing units at an average density of 449.5 per square mile (173.6/km^{2}). The racial makeup of the borough was 94.00% White, 0.99% African American, 0.01% Native American, 3.87% Asian, 0.06% Pacific Islander, 0.38% from other races, and 0.68% from two or more races. Hispanic or Latino of any race were 2.15% of the population.

There were 3,239 households, out of which 30.8% had children under the age of 18 living with them, 66.7% were married couples living together, 7.3% had a female householder with no husband present, and 23.6% were non-families. 20.7% of all households were made up of individuals, and 10.0% had someone living alone who was 65 years of age or older. The average household size was 2.62 and the average family size was 3.05.

In the borough the population was spread out, with 21.7% under the age of 18, 5.0% from 18 to 24, 25.2% from 25 to 44, 27.7% from 45 to 64, and 20.4% who were 65 years of age or older. The median age was 44 years. For every 100 females, there were 86.0 males. For every 100 females age 18 and over, there were 80.6 males.

The median income for a household in the borough was $88,706, and the median income for a family was $102,047. Males had a median income of $74,410 versus $49,551 for females. The per capita income for the borough was $42,133. About 2.4% of families and 5.8% of the population were below the poverty line, including 3.8% of those under age 18 and 11.9% of those age 65 or over.

== Economy ==
Florham Park is the North American headquarters of the BASF corporation, the world's largest chemical company. Nickel alloys producer VDM Metals USA (formerly operating under the name of ThyssenKrupp VDM USA and Precision Rolled Products) operates a melting plant in Florham Park. Business process services company Conduent and bookseller BNED are based in Florham Park.

The National Football League's New York Jets relocated their main headquarters in 2008 to the Atlantic Health Jets Training Center, located in Florham Park. The Jets relocated to Florham Park from their old facilities at Hofstra University in Hempstead, New York. The team holds its day-to-day operations during the year in Florham Park, while relocating during July and August to Cortland, New York, for training camp. Florham Park beat out Berkeley Heights, Jersey City, Millburn, South Amboy, and Wood-Ridge, which had all been finalists contending to be the host of the new facility.

== Government ==
=== Local government ===
Florham Park is governed under the borough form of New Jersey municipal government, which is used in 218 municipalities (of the 564) statewide, making it the most common form of government in New Jersey. The governing body is comprised of the mayor and the borough council, with all positions elected at-large on a partisan basis as part of the November general election. The mayor is elected directly by the voters to a four-year term of office. The borough council includes six members elected to serve three-year terms on a staggered basis, with two seats coming up for election each year in a three-year cycle. The borough form of government used by Florham Park, the most common system used in the state, is a "weak mayor / strong council" government in which council members act as the legislative body, with the mayor presiding at meetings and voting only in the event of a tie. The mayor can veto ordinances subject to an override by a two-thirds majority vote of the council. The mayor makes committee and liaison assignments for council members, and most appointments are made by the mayor with the advice and consent of the council.

As of 2024, the mayor of Florham Park is Republican Mark Taylor, serving a term of office ending on December 31, 2027. Members of the borough council are Scott Carpenter (R, 2024), Nicholas Cicarelli (R, 2025), Glen Johnstone (R, 2026), Charles J. Malone Jr. (R, 2026), Joshua I. Marchal (R, 2024) and Kristen Santoro (R, 2025).

In May 2013, the borough council chose Council President Mark Taylor from a list of three candidates nominated by the Republican municipal committee to fill the vacant mayoral seat of R. Scott Eveland, who had resigned from office in March from a term expiring in December 2015. At the same meeting, the council selected Thomas Michalowski from the list of three candidates nominated to fill the vacant council seat of David Wikstrom, who had resigned in April from a term expiring in December 2013. In April 2013, the council chose William Zuckerman from the list of three nominees to fill Mark Taylor's vacant council seat expiring in December 2016.

=== Federal, state and county representation ===
Florham Park is located in the 11th Congressional District and is part of New Jersey's 26th state legislative district.

For the 119th United States Congress, New Jersey's 11th congressional district is represented by Analilia Mejia (D, Glen Ridge) who was elected in a 2026 special election to serve for the remainder of the Congress following the resignation Mikie Sherrill (D, Montclair), who was elected Governor of New Jersey in 2025. New Jersey is represented in the United States Senate by Democrats Cory Booker (Newark, term ends 2027) and Andy Kim (Moorestown, term ends 2031).

For the 2026–2027 session, the 26th legislative district of the New Jersey Legislature is represented in the State Senate by Joseph Pennacchio (R, Rockaway Township) and in the General Assembly by Brian Bergen (R, Denville Township) and Jay Webber (R, Morris Plains).

Morris County is governed by a Board of County Commissioners comprised of seven members who are elected at-large in partisan elections to three-year terms on a staggered basis, with either one or three seats up for election each year as part of the November general election. Actual day-to-day operation of departments is supervised by County Administrator Deena Leary.

As of 2026, Morris County's Commissioners (with all terms ending December 31) are Director Stephen H. Shaw (R, Mountain Lakes, 2027), Deputy Director John Krickus (R, Washington Township, 2027), Douglas Cabana (R, Boonton Township, 2028), Thomas J. Mastrangelo (R, Montville, 2028), Christine Myers (R, Harding Township, 2028), Tayfun Selen (R, Chatham Township, 2026), and Deborah Smith (R, Denville Township, 2027).

The county's constitutional officers are County Clerk Ann F. Grossi (R, Parsippany–Troy Hills, 2028), Sheriff James M. Gannon (R, Boonton Township, 2028) and Surrogate Heather Darling (R, Roxbury, 2029).

=== Politics ===
United States presidential election results for Florham Park 2024 2020 2016 2012 2008 2004
Year	Republican		Democratic		Third party(ies)	
Year	No.	%	No.	%	No.	%
2024	3,740	51.13%	3,505	47.92%	70	0.96%
2020	3,549	50.18%	3,457	48.88%	67	0.95%
2016	3,175	53.88%	2,548	43.24%	170	2.88%
2012	3,273	59.77%	2,165	39.54%	38	0.69%
2008	3,384	59.44%	2,270	39.87%	39	0.69%
2004	3,382	61.58%	2,082	37.91%	28	0.51%

As of June 2024, there were a total of 9,734 registered voters in Florham Park, of which 2,926 (30.05%) were registered as Democrats, 3,791 (38.94%) were registered as Republicans and 3,017 (30.99%) were registered as Unaffiliated.

Gubernatorial election results for Florham Park
Year	Republican		Democratic		Third party(ies)	
Year	No.	%	No.	%	No.	%
2025	3,109	51.47%	2,921	48.36%	10	0.17%
2021	2,772	57.74%	2,009	41.85%	20	0.42%
2017	1,852	56.00%	1,426	43.12%	29	0.88%
2013	2,674	73.56%	927	25.50%	34	0.94%
2009	2,410	62.21%	1,155	29.81%	309	7.98%
2005	2,093	60.98%	1,277	37.21%	62	1.81%

In the 2013 gubernatorial election, Republican Chris Christie received 73.6% of the vote (2,674 cast), ahead of Democrat Barbara Buono with 25.5% (927 votes), and other candidates with 0.9% (34 votes), among the 3,713 ballots cast by the borough's 7,664 registered voters (78 ballots were spoiled), for a turnout of 48.4%. In the 2009 gubernatorial election, Republican Chris Christie received 61.7% of the vote (2,410 ballots cast), ahead of Democrat Jon Corzine with 29.6% (1,155 votes), Independent Chris Daggett with 7.8% (304 votes) and other candidates with 0.1% (5 votes), among the 3,903 ballots cast by the borough's 7,118 registered voters, yielding a 54.8% turnout.

United States Senate election results for Florham Park1
Year	Republican		Democratic		Third party(ies)	
Year	No.	%	No.	%	No.	%
2024	3,626	51.83%	3,276	46.83%	94	1.34%
2018	2,930	56.99%	2,104	40.93%	107	2.08%
2012	3,002	59.09%	2,045	40.26%	33	0.65%
2006	2,193	61.79%	1,304	36.74%	52	1.47%

United States Senate election results for Florham Park2
Year	Republican		Democratic		Third party(ies)	
Year	No.	%	No.	%	No.	%
2020	3,489	51.18%	3,278	48.09%	50	0.73%
2014	1,833	58.69%	1,262	40.41%	28	0.90%
2013	1,472	59.12%	1,006	40.40%	12	0.48%
2008	3,123	61.09%	1,948	38.11%	41	0.80%

== Education ==
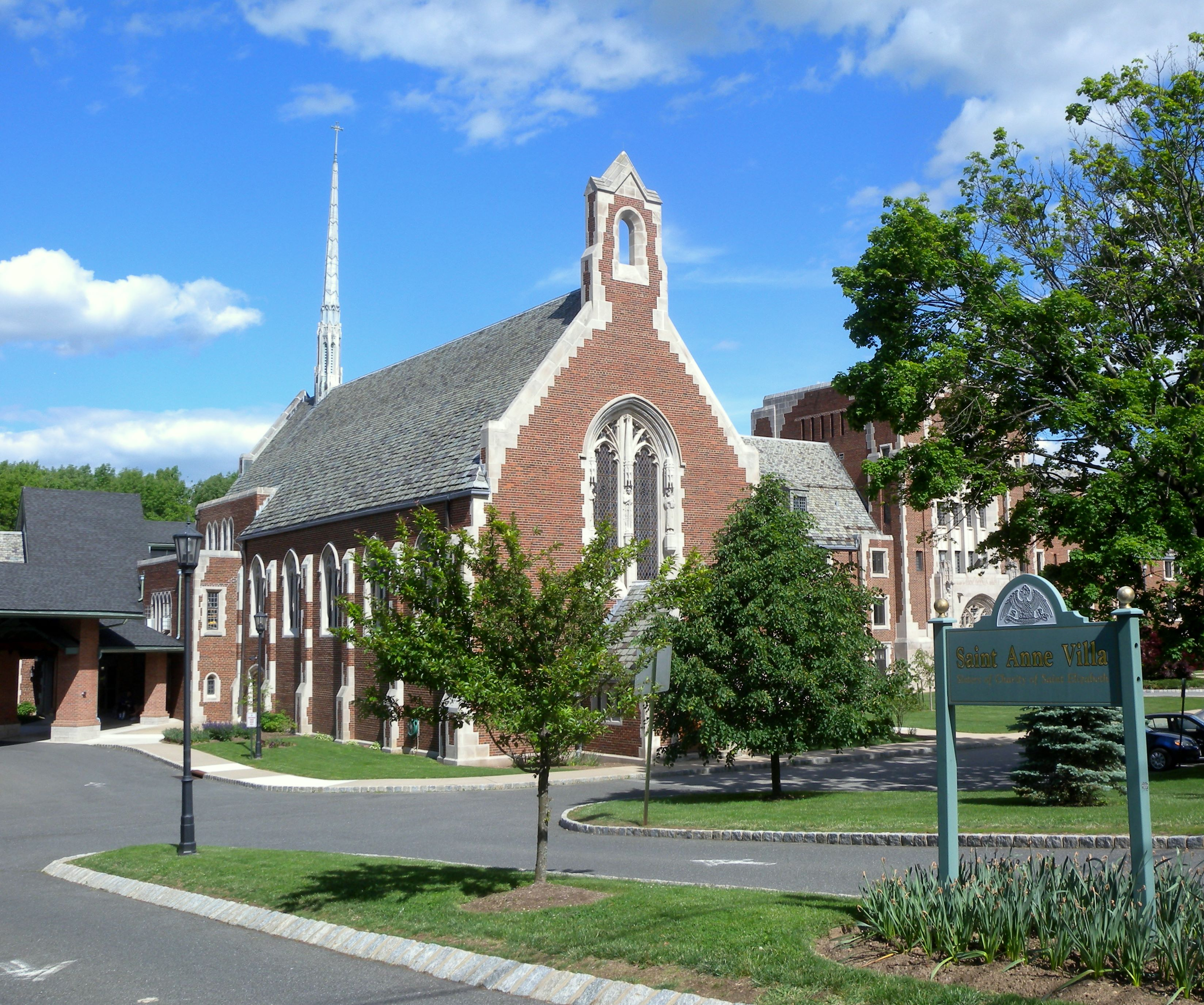
Saint Anne Villa

The Florham Park School District serves public school students in pre-kindergarten through eighth grade. As of the 2023–24 school year, the district, comprised of three schools, had an enrollment of 948 students and 97.1 classroom teachers (on an FTE basis), for a student–teacher ratio of 9.8:1. The schools in the district (with 2023–24 school enrollment data from the National Center for Education Statistics) are Briarwood Elementary School with 332 students in grades PreK–2, Brooklake Elementary School with 308 students in grades 3–5 and Ridgedale Middle School with 298 students in grades 6–8.

Students in public school for ninth through twelfth grades attend Hanover Park High School together with students from East Hanover Township, where the school is located, as part of the Hanover Park Regional High School District, which also serves students from the neighboring community of Hanover Township at Whippany Park High School in the Whippany section of Hanover Township. As of the 2023–24 school year, the high school had an enrollment of 713 students and 72.3 classroom teachers (on an FTE basis), for a student–teacher ratio of 9.9:1. The seats on the district's nine-member board of education are allocated to the constituent municipalities based on population, with Florham Park assigned three seats.

Holy Family School is a Catholic school operated under the auspices of the Roman Catholic Diocese of Paterson. The school opened in 1954 with 173 students and reached a peak enrollment of 700 in the 1960s.

Portions of the Saint Elizabeth University campus are in Florham Park, including the Villa of Saint Ann, a classical Greek amphitheater built into a hillside, and the original dairy farm for the complex. Portions of the Fairleigh Dickinson University's Florham Campus, also are located in Florham Park.

== Transportation ==
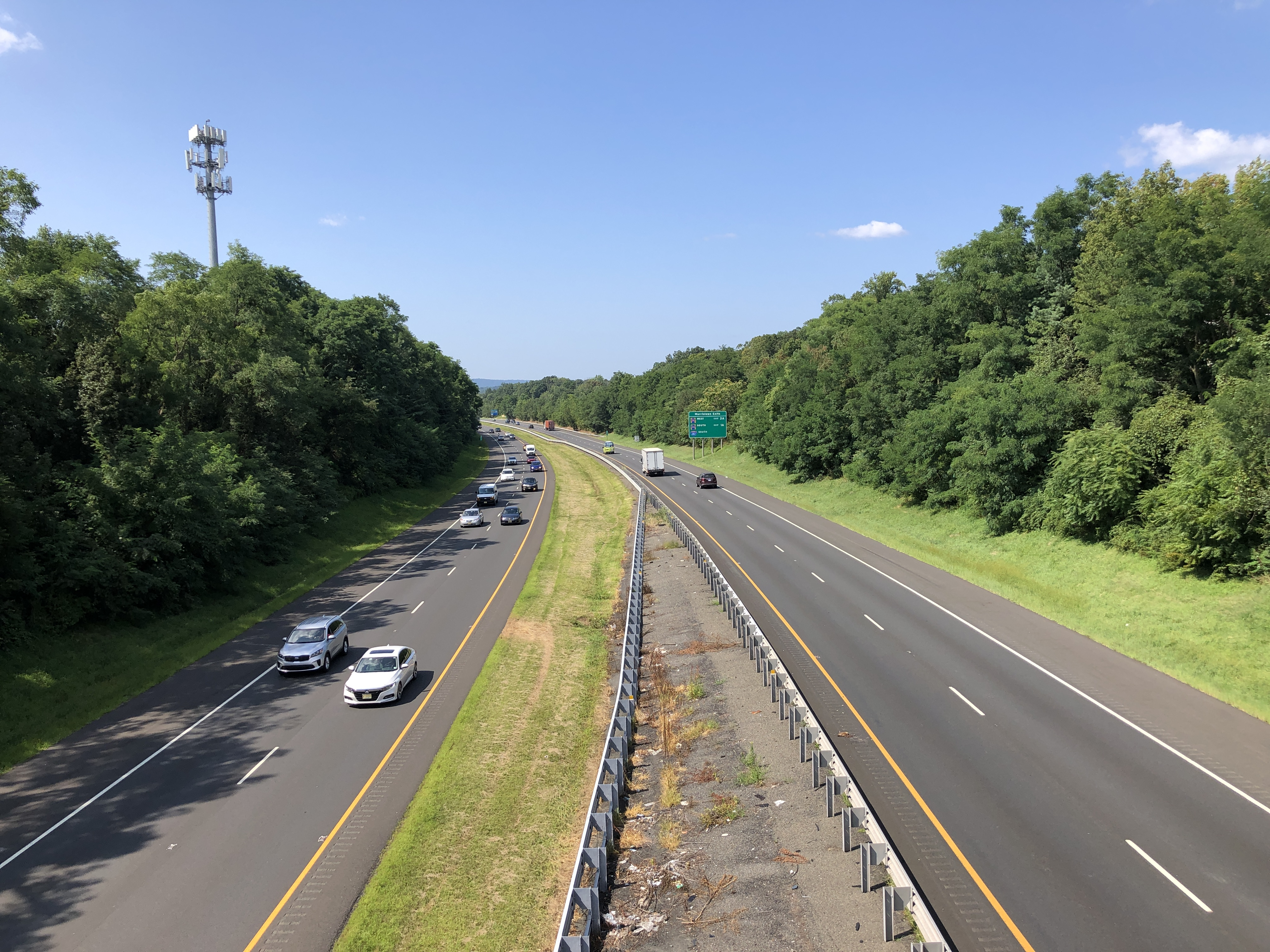
Route 24 westbound in Florham Park

=== Roads and highways ===
As of May 2010, the borough had a total of 48.73 miles (78.42 km) of roadways, of which 37.56 miles (60.45 km) were maintained by the municipality, 8.01 miles (12.89 km) by Morris County and 3.16 miles (5.09 km) by the New Jersey Department of Transportation.

New Jersey Route 24 is the most prominent highway directly serving Florham Park. There is one interchange partially within the borough, Exit 2 (County Route 510), which also passes through the borough.

=== Public transportation ===
NJ Transit provides bus service from the borough to Newark on the 70 and 73 routes, with local service on the 878 route. Service had been offered on the MCM8 route, which was suspended in 2010 after subsidies to the contract provider were eliminated as part of NJ Transit budget cuts.

NJ Transit service to and from New York Penn Station is available at the Madison station on the Morristown Line.

== Notable people ==
People who were born in, residents of, or otherwise closely associated with Florham Park include:

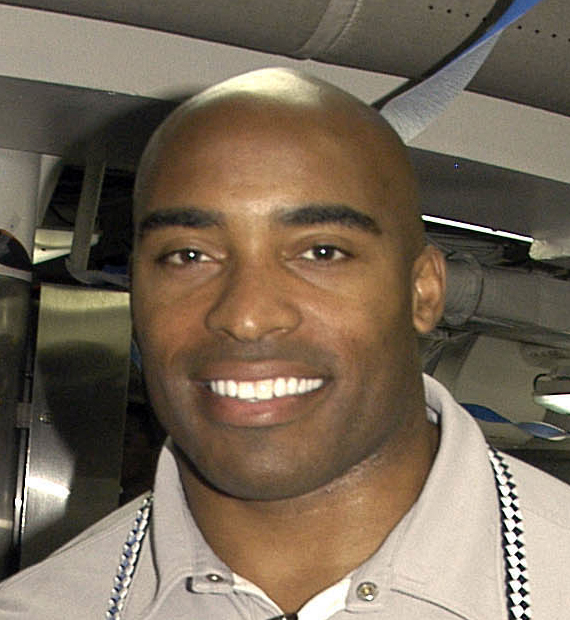
Former NFL player Tiki Barber

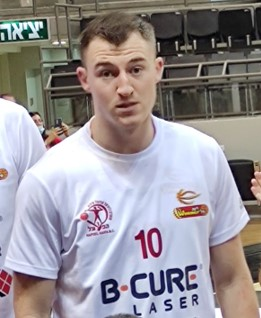
Spencer Weisz

- Kary Antholis (born 1962), Academy Award-winning documentary filmmaker
- William Antholis (born 1965), political scientist, who is director and CEO of the Miller Center of Public Affairs
- Tiki Barber (born 1975), former football player who played in the NFL for the New York Giants
- Salvatore A. Bontempo (1909–1989), politician who served as chairman of the New Jersey Democratic State Committee
- William Consovoy (1974–2023), attorney for conservative causes
- John T. Cunningham (1915–2012), New Jersey's popular historian
- Eric Duncan (born 1984), former professional baseball player
- Mark Guiliana (born 1980), drummer, composer, and leader of the band Beat Music
- Johan Hedberg (born 1973), former NHL goaltender
- Ralph A. Loveys (1929–2017), politician who was elected to three terms in the New Jersey General Assembly, where he represented the 26th Legislative District
- Archie Moore (born 1940), MLB player who appeared in 40 games for the New York Yankees in 1964 and 1965
- Matthew Platkin (born 1986), attorney who served as New Jersey attorney general from 2022 to 2026
- Bill Raftery (born 1943), basketball analyst and former college basketball coach
- Lange Schermerhorn (born 1939), career foreign service officer who served as United States Ambassador to Djibouti from December 1997 until November 2000
- Bill Simon (born 1951), banker, businessman, politician and attorney who ran as a Republican in the 2002 California gubernatorial election
- Tony Siragusa (1967–2022), former football player with the Indianapolis Colts and Baltimore Ravens
- Snooki (born 1987), reality TV personality from the shows Jersey Shore and Snooki & Jwoww
- Florence Adele Vanderbilt Twombly (1854–1952), heiress and a member of the Vanderbilt family
- Hamilton McKown Twombly (1849–1910), businessman
- Spencer Weisz (born 1995), American-Israeli professional basketball player for Hapoel Haifa of the Israeli Basketball Premier League
