= Morris Plains, New Jersey =

Borough in Morris County, New Jersey, US

- Borough
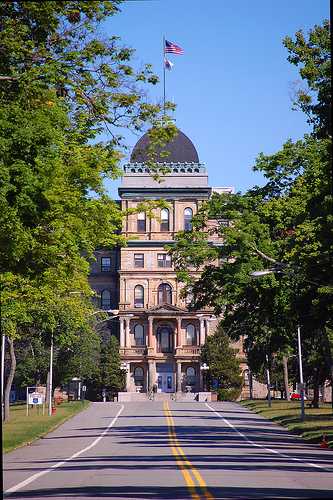
- Greystone Park Psychiatric Hospital

- Seal
- Motto: "The Community of Caring"
- Location of Morris Plains in Morris County highlighted in red (right). Inset map: Location of Morris County in New Jersey highlighted in orange (left).

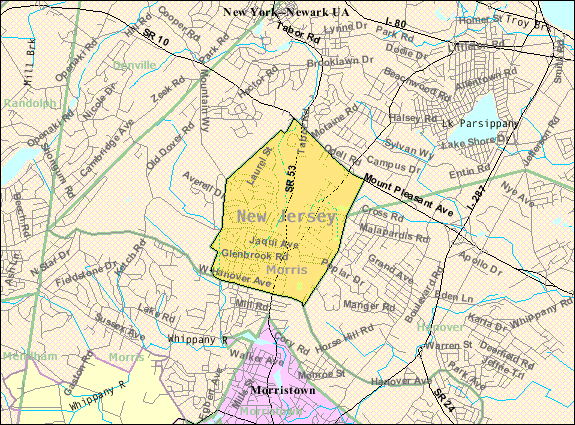
- Census Bureau map of Morris Plains, New Jersey

- Location in Morris County Location in New Jersey Location in the United States
- Coordinates: 40.838806°N 74.474196°W
- Country: United States
- State: New Jersey
- County: Morris
- Incorporated: April 15, 1926
- Named for: Lewis Morris

Government
  - Type: Borough
  - Body: Borough Council
  - Mayor: Jason C. Karr (D, term ends December 31, 2026)
  - Municipal clerk: RoseMarie Leyhan

Area
  - Total: 2.59 sq mi (6.71 km^{2})
  - Land: 2.55 sq mi (6.61 km^{2})
  - Water: 0.035 sq mi (0.09 km^{2}) 1.35%
  - Rank: 369th of 565 in state 30th of 39 in county
- Elevation: 430 ft (130 m)

Population (2020)
  - Total: 6,153
  - Estimate (2024): 6,590
  - Rank: 341st of 565 in state 28th of 39 in county
  - Density: 2,409.6/sq mi (930.4/km^{2})
  - Rank: 258th of 565 in state 12th of 39 in county
- Time zone: UTC−05:00 (Eastern (EST))
  - Summer (DST): UTC−04:00 (Eastern (EDT))
- ZIP Code: 07950
- Area code: 973
- FIPS code: 3402748210
- GNIS feature ID: 0885308
- Website: www.morrisplainsboro.org

Morris Plains is a borough in Morris County, in the U.S. state of New Jersey. As of the 2020 United States census, the borough's population was 6,153, an increase of 621 (+11.2%) from the 2010 census count of 5,532, which in turn reflected an increase of 296 (+5.7%) from the 5,236 counted in the 2000 census.

Morris Plains was incorporated as a borough by an act of the New Jersey Legislature on March 15, 1926, from portions of Hanover Township, based on the results of a referendum held on April 15, 1926. The borough's name comes from Lewis Morris, colonial governor of New Jersey.

Morris Plains serves as a bedroom community, with many residents traveling to work in New York City. The Morristown Line of NJ Transit provides commuters with direct access to New York Penn Station and Hoboken Terminal.

== Geography ==
According to the United States Census Bureau, the borough had a total area of 2.59 square miles (6.71 km^{2}), including 2.55 square miles (6.61 km^{2}) of land and 0.04 square miles (0.09 km^{2}) of water (1.35%).

Unincorporated communities, localities and place names located partially or completely within the township include Littleton.

The borough borders the Morris County municipalities of Hanover Township, Morris Township and Parsippany–Troy Hills.

=== Climate ===
The climate in this area is characterized by hot, humid summers and generally mild to cool winters. According to the Köppen Climate Classification system, Morris Plains has a humid subtropical climate, abbreviated "Cfa" on climate maps.

== Demographics ==
Historical population
Census	Pop.	Note	%±
1930	1,713		—
1940	2,018		17.8%
1950	2,707		34.1%
1960	4,703		73.7%
1970	5,540		17.8%
1980	5,305		−4.2%
1990	5,219		−1.6%
2000	5,236		0.3%
2010	5,532		5.7%
2020	6,153		11.2%
2024 (est.)	6,590	▲	7.1%
Population sources: 1930; 1940–2000 2000; 2010 2020

=== 2020 census ===
As of the 2020 census, Morris Plains had a population of 6,153. The median age was 41.8 years. 20.8% of residents were under the age of 18 and 18.7% of residents were 65 years of age or older. For every 100 females there were 91.4 males, and for every 100 females age 18 and over there were 90.3 males age 18 and over.

100.0% of residents lived in urban areas, while 0.0% lived in rural areas.

There were 2,432 households in Morris Plains, of which 30.0% had children under the age of 18 living in them. Of all households, 57.5% were married-couple households, 12.3% were households with a male householder and no spouse or partner present, and 25.0% were households with a female householder and no spouse or partner present. About 24.8% of all households were made up of individuals and 12.5% had someone living alone who was 65 years of age or older.

There were 2,527 housing units, of which 3.8% were vacant. The homeowner vacancy rate was 0.7% and the rental vacancy rate was 6.7%.

Racial composition as of the 2020 census
Race	Number	Percent
White	4,779	77.7%
Black or African American	232	3.8%
American Indian and Alaska Native	0	0.0%
Asian	487	7.9%
Native Hawaiian and Other Pacific Islander	0	0.0%
Some other race	216	3.5%
Two or more races	439	7.1%
Hispanic or Latino (of any race)	590	9.6%

=== 2010 census ===
The 2010 United States census counted 5,532 people, 2,131 households, and 1,485 families in the borough. The population density was 2,163.5 per square mile (835.3/km^{2}). There were 2,197 housing units at an average density of 859.2 per square mile (331.7/km^{2}). The racial makeup was 89.44% (4,948) White, 2.73% (151) Black or African American, 0.09% (5) Native American, 4.97% (275) Asian, 0.00% (0) Pacific Islander, 1.07% (59) from other races, and 1.70% (94) from two or more races. Hispanic or Latino people of any race were 5.68% (314) of the population.

Of the 2,131 households, 32.3% had children under the age of 18; 61.3% were married couples living together; 6.4% had a female householder with no husband present and 30.3% were non-families. Of all households, 24.9% were made up of individuals and 13.1% had someone living alone who was 65 years of age or older. The average household size was 2.57 and the average family size was 3.12.

24.8% of the population were under the age of 18, 4.7% from 18 to 24, 25.4% from 25 to 44, 28.5% from 45 to 64, and 16.6% who were 65 years of age or older. The median age was 42.1 years. For every 100 females, the population had 93.5 males. For every 100 females ages 18 and older there were 89.4 males.

The Census Bureau's 2006–2010 American Community Survey showed that (in 2010 inflation-adjusted dollars) median household income was $103,688 (with a margin of error of +/− $12,744) and the median family income was $127,614 (+/− $20,257). Males had a median income of $91,908 (+/− $21,398) versus $67,232 (+/− $24,331) for females. The per capita income for the borough was $45,165 (+/− $10,332). About 0.4% of families and 9.5% of the population were below the poverty line, including none of those under age 18 and 0.6% of those age 65 or over.

=== 2000 census ===
As of the 2000 United States census there were 5,236 people, 1,955 households, and 1,477 families residing in the borough. The population density was 2,018.7 inhabitants per square mile (779.4/km^{2}). There were 1,994 housing units at an average density of 768.8 per square mile (296.8/km^{2}). The racial makeup of the borough was 92.91% White, 1.34% African American, 0.06% Native American, 4.32% Asian, 0.10% Pacific Islander, 0.40% from other races, and 0.88% from two or more races. Hispanic or Latino people of any race were 2.69% of the population.

There were 1,955 households, out of which 33.1% had children under the age of 18 living with them, 67.0% were married couples living together, 7.0% had a female householder with no husband present, and 24.4% were non-families. 19.7% of all households were made up of individuals, and 8.6% had someone living alone who was 65 years of age or older. The average household size was 2.63 and the average family size was 3.05.

In the borough the population was spread out, with 23.5% under the age of 18, 4.4% from 18 to 24, 29.4% from 25 to 44, 26.4% from 45 to 64, and 16.2% who were 65 years of age or older. The average age was 41 years. For every 100 females, there were 92.2 males. For every 100 females age 18 and over, there were 86.6 males.

The median income for a household in the borough was $84,806, and the median income for a family was $98,333. Males had a median income of $75,040 versus $44,554 for females. The per capita income for the borough was $36,553. About 1.5% of families and 2.4% of the population were below the poverty line, including 3.0% of those under age 18 and 2.4% of those age 65 or over.

== Economy ==
The borough has been a major base of operations for Pfizer, previously the headquarters for Warner-Lambert. Pfizer has sponsored the Health and Medical Science Academy at Morristown High School and an annual 5k race around Morris Plains. In 2012, a 63-acre (25 ha) property owned by Pfizer on the west side of Route 53 was acquired by M&M Realty Partners, which plans to redevelop the site for a mixed use development that would include 500 housing units and 100,000 square feet (9,300 m^{2}) for retail use.

In 2015, Honeywell moved into a 475,000-square-foot (44,100 m^{2}) headquarters on a 40-acre (16 ha) campus, after relocating from AlliedSignal headquarters in Morristown.

== Government ==
=== Local government ===
Morris Plains is governed under the borough form of New Jersey municipal government, which is used in 218 municipalities (of the 564) statewide, making it the most common form of government in New Jersey. The governing body is comprised of the mayor and the borough council, with all positions elected at-large on a partisan basis as part of the November general election. The mayor is elected directly by the voters to a four-year term of office. The borough council includes six members elected to serve three-year terms on a staggered basis, with two seats coming up for election each year in a three-year cycle. The borough form of government used by Morris Plains is a "weak mayor / strong council" government in which council members act as the legislative body with the mayor presiding at meetings and voting only in the event of a tie. The mayor can veto ordinances subject to an override by a two-thirds majority vote of the council. The mayor makes committee and liaison assignments for council members, and most appointments are made by the mayor with the advice and consent of the council.

As of 2025, the mayor of Morris Plains is Democrat Jason C. Karr, whose term of office ends December 31, 2026. Members of the Borough Council are Council President Salvatore F. "Sal" Cortese (R, 2026), Art J. Bruhn, Jr. (R, 2026), Bill Houston (D, 2027), Michael Ivey (D, 2025), Tyler J. Pontier (D, 2027), and Nancy Verga (D, 2025).

The Morris Plains Municipal Court judge is Michael A. Carlucci.

==== Police department ====
The Morris Plains Police Department has 17 sworn officers. The command structure has a chief, two lieutenants, five sergeants, nine patrolmen and six civilians. They are dispatched through the Morris County Communication Center who dispatches for the police, fire and first aid departments. The police department handled over 29,000 calls for the year 2010.

==== Fire department ====
The Morris Plains Fire Association was established on April 28, 1907, after the Weise Hotel Fire of 1906.

=== Federal, state and county representation ===
Morris Plains is located in the 11th Congressional District and is part of New Jersey's 26th state legislative district.

For the 119th United States Congress, New Jersey's 11th congressional district is represented by Analilia Mejia (D, Glen Ridge) who was elected in a 2026 special election to serve for the remainder of the Congress following the resignation Mikie Sherrill (D, Montclair), who was elected Governor of New Jersey in 2025. New Jersey is represented in the United States Senate by Democrats Cory Booker (Newark, term ends 2027) and Andy Kim (Moorestown, term ends 2031).

For the 2026–2027 session, the 26th legislative district of the New Jersey Legislature is represented in the State Senate by Joseph Pennacchio (R, Rockaway Township) and in the General Assembly by Brian Bergen (R, Denville Township) and Jay Webber (R, Morris Plains).

Morris County is governed by a Board of County Commissioners comprised of seven members who are elected at-large in partisan elections to three-year terms on a staggered basis, with either one or three seats up for election each year as part of the November general election. Actual day-to-day operation of departments is supervised by County Administrator Deena Leary.

As of 2026, Morris County's Commissioners (with all terms ending December 31) are Director Stephen H. Shaw (R, Mountain Lakes, 2027), Deputy Director John Krickus (R, Washington Township, 2027), Douglas Cabana (R, Boonton Township, 2028), Thomas J. Mastrangelo (R, Montville, 2028), Christine Myers (R, Harding Township, 2028), Tayfun Selen (R, Chatham Township, 2026), and Deborah Smith (R, Denville Township, 2027).

The county's constitutional officers are County Clerk Ann F. Grossi (R, Parsippany–Troy Hills, 2028), Sheriff James M. Gannon (R, Boonton Township, 2025) and Surrogate Heather Darling (R, Roxbury, 2029).

=== Politics ===
United States presidential election results for Morris Plains 2024 2020 2016 2012 2008 2004
Year	Republican		Democratic		Third party(ies)	
Year	No.	%	No.	%	No.	%
2024	1,817	42.68%	2,364	55.53%	76	1.79%
2020	1,623	40.87%	2,294	57.77%	54	1.36%
2016	1,457	45.18%	1,628	50.48%	140	4.34%
2012	1,659	53.26%	1,429	45.87%	27	0.87%
2008	1,725	52.87%	1,511	46.31%	27	0.83%
2004	1,783	56.09%	1,365	42.94%	31	0.98%

As of March 2011, there were a total of 3,935 registered voters in Morris Plains, of which 853 (21.7%) were registered as Democrats, 1,695 (43.1%) were registered as Republicans and 1,381 (35.1%) were registered as Unaffiliated. There were 6 voters registered as Libertarians or Greens.

Gubernatorial election results for Morris Plains
Year	Republican		Democratic		Third party(ies)	
Year	No.	%	No.	%	No.	%
2025	1,538	42.70%	2,053	57.00%	11	0.31%
2021	1,297	48.91%	1,340	50.53%	15	0.57%
2017	981	48.78%	997	49.58%	33	1.64%
2013	1,399	70.76%	551	27.87%	27	1.37%
2009	1,337	59.24%	719	31.86%	201	8.91%
2005	1,208	57.41%	838	39.83%	58	2.76%

In the 2012 presidential election, Republican Mitt Romney received 53.3% of the vote (1,659 cast), ahead of Democrat Barack Obama with 45.9% (1,429 votes), and other candidates with 0.9% (27 votes), among the 3,142 ballots cast by the borough's 4,140 registered voters (27 ballots were spoiled), for a turnout of 75.9%. In the 2008 presidential election, Republican John McCain received 52.3% of the vote (1,725 cast), ahead of Democrat Barack Obama with 45.8% (1,511 votes) and other candidates with 0.8% (27 votes), among the 3,297 ballots cast by the borough's 3,994 registered voters, for a turnout of 82.5%. In the 2004 presidential election, Republican George W. Bush received 55.9% of the vote (1,783 ballots cast), outpolling Democrat John Kerry with 42.8% (1,365 votes) and other candidates with 0.8% (31 votes), among the 3,191 ballots cast by the borough's 3,921 registered voters, for a turnout percentage of 81.4.

In the 2013 gubernatorial election, Republican Chris Christie received 70.8% of the vote (1,399 cast), ahead of Democrat Barbara Buono with 27.9% (551 votes), and other candidates with 1.4% (27 votes), among the 2,025 ballots cast by the borough's 4,122 registered voters (48 ballots were spoiled), for a turnout of 49.1%. In the 2009 gubernatorial election, Republican Chris Christie received 58.6% of the vote (1,337 ballots cast), ahead of Democrat Jon Corzine with 31.5% (719 votes), Independent Chris Daggett with 8.4% (191 votes) and other candidates with 0.4% (10 votes), among the 2,283 ballots cast by the borough's 3,898 registered voters, yielding a 58.6% turnout.

United States Senate election results for Morris Plains1
Year	Republican		Democratic		Third party(ies)	
Year	No.	%	No.	%	No.	%
2024	1,814	44.35%	2,215	54.16%	61	1.49%
2018	1,508	50.69%	1,385	46.55%	82	2.76%
2012	1,580	54.48%	1,286	44.34%	34	1.17%
2006	1,306	57.97%	901	39.99%	46	2.04%

United States Senate election results for Morris Plains2
Year	Republican		Democratic		Third party(ies)	
Year	No.	%	No.	%	No.	%
2020	1,706	44.14%	2,122	54.90%	37	0.96%
2014	864	53.97%	714	44.60%	23	1.44%
2013	697	51.90%	632	47.06%	14	1.04%
2008	1,720	56.84%	1,266	41.84%	40	1.32%

== Education ==
The Morris Plains Schools educate public school students from pre-kindergarten through eighth grade. As of the 2023–24 school year, the district, comprised of two schools, had an enrollment of 601 students and 66.3 classroom teachers (on an FTE basis), for a student–teacher ratio of 9.1:1. Schools in the district (with 2023–24 enrollment data from the National Center for Education Statistics) are Mountain Way School with 209 students in grades PreK–2 and Morris Plains Borough School with 391 students in grades 3–8.

Students in public school for ninth through twelfth grades attend Morristown High School, as part of a sending/receiving relationship with the Morris School District which also serves the communities of Morristown and Morris Township (for grades K–12). As of the 2023–24 school year, the high school had an enrollment of 1,856 students and 137.6 classroom teachers (on an FTE basis), for a student–teacher ratio of 13.5:1.

St. Virgil Academy, founded in 1910, was a Catholic school serving students in preschool through eighth grade (including Pre-K–3 and Pre-K–4) that operated under the auspices of the Roman Catholic Diocese of Paterson. The school was closed at the end of the 2015–2016 school year in the wake of declining enrollment and the rising costs of covering the school's deficits.

== Transportation ==
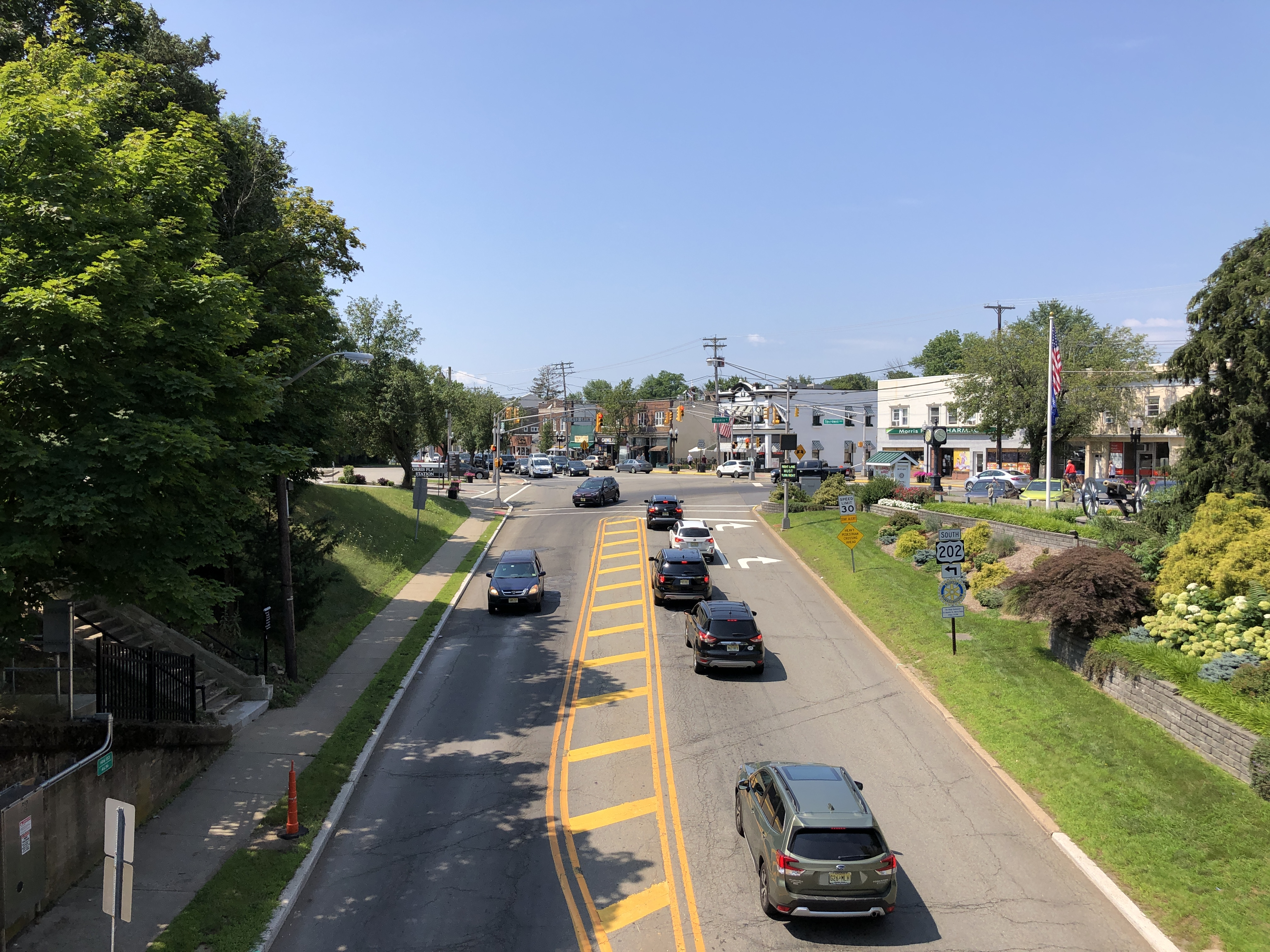
U.S. Route 202 southbound in Morris Plains

=== Roads and highways ===
As of May 2010, the borough had a total of 28.66 miles (46.12 km) of roadways, of which 24.15 miles (38.87 km) were maintained by the municipality, 1.81 miles (2.91 km) by Morris County and 2.70 miles (4.35 km) by the New Jersey Department of Transportation.

U.S. Route 202, Route 10 and Route 53 are the main highways serving Morris Plains. Interstate 80 and Interstate 287 are both accessible in neighboring Parsippany–Troy Hills.

=== Public transportation ===
NJ Transit provides service at the Morris Plains station on the Morristown Line to Newark Broad Street station, Secaucus Junction, New York Penn Station and Hoboken Terminal. The one-story red brick station house, constructed in 1915 in Renaissance Revival style, was added to the National Register of Historic Places on June 22, 1984.

NJ Transit provides local bus service on the 872, 875 and 880 routes, replacing service that had been offered on the MCM2, MCM3 and MCM10 routes until 2010, when subsidies to the local provider were eliminated as part of budget cuts.

== TV and movies ==
- In The Sopranos episode "Made in America", Phil Leotardo is shot to death at a Morris Plains Raceway gas station, located on route 10, before being run over.

== Notable people ==
People who were born in, residents of, or otherwise closely associated with Morris Plains include:

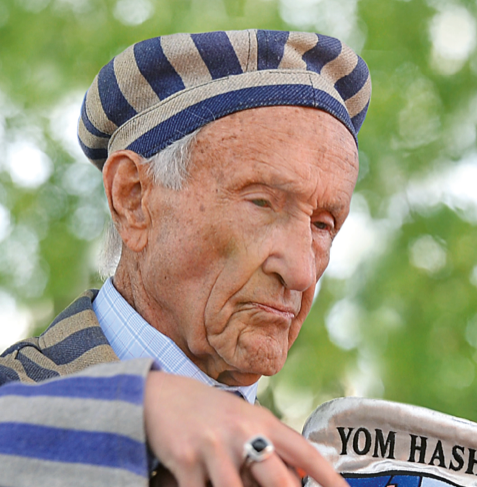
Edward Mosberg

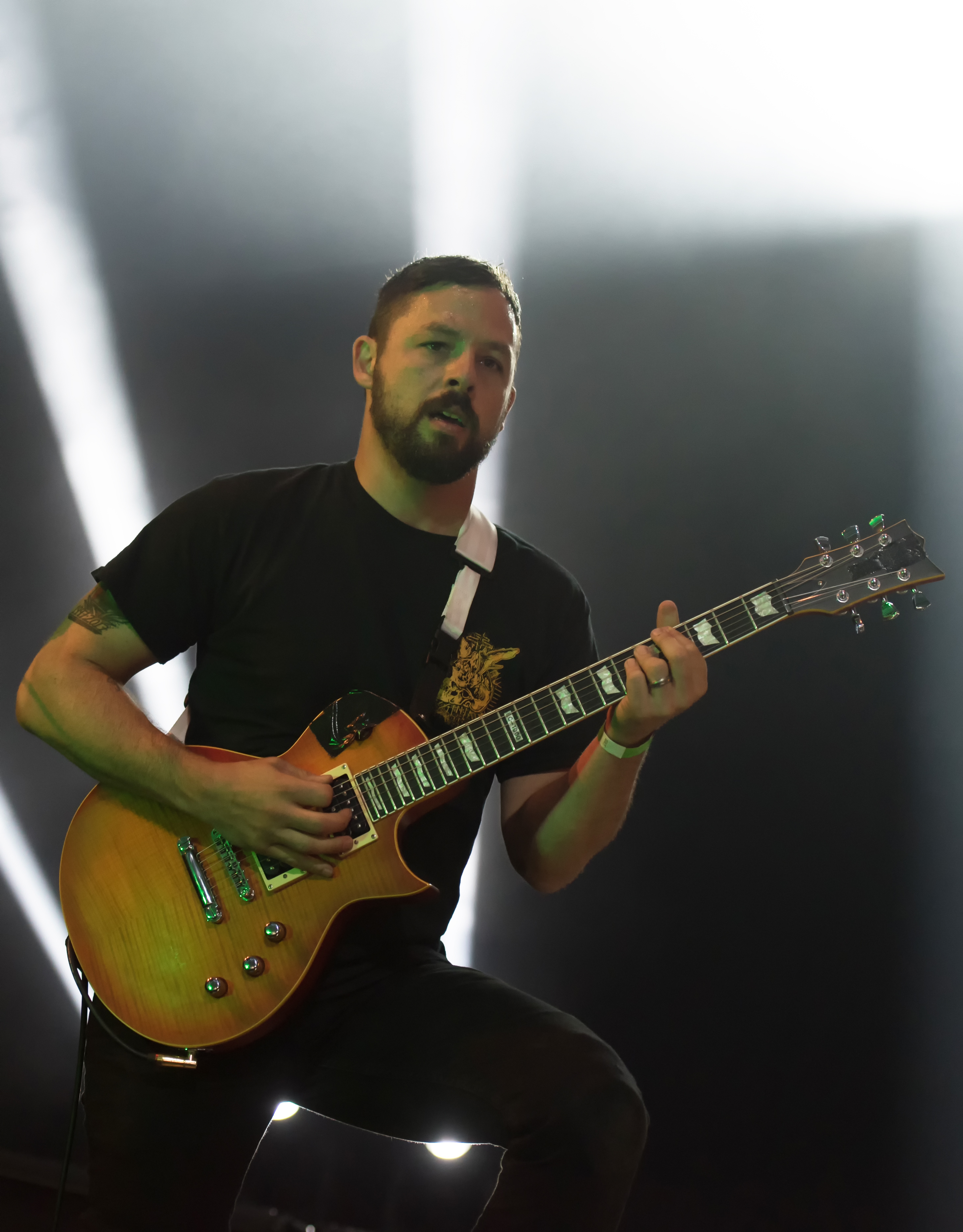
Ben Weinman

- Darron Collins (born 1970), human ecologist and academic administrator specializing in ethnobotany, who became president of the College of the Atlantic in 2011
- Michael Dogbe (born 1996), defensive end for the Arizona Cardinals
- William Perry Fogg (1826–1909), author and adventurer
- Robert Martin (born 1947), state senator who represented the 26th Legislative District from 1993 to 2008
- Richard Aldrich McCurdy (1835–1916), attorney, business executive and banker who was president of the Mutual Life Insurance Company of New York from 1885 to 1906
- Charley Molnar (born 1961), former head football coach at the University of Massachusetts Amherst
- Edward Mosberg (1926-2022), Polish-American Holocaust survivor, educator and philanthropist
- Carol J. Murphy (1932–2011), member of the New Jersey General Assembly from 1992 to 2000
- Azariah Pierson (1817-1890), Indian agent, pharmacist, draftsman and Freemason in Minnesota
- Suzanne Scott (born 1965/66), CEO of Fox News
- Gustav Stickley (1858–1942), furniture manufacturer, design leader, publisher and the chief proselytizer for the American Craftsman style
- Louis A. Thebaud (1859–1939), businessman, sportsman and philanthropist in the Gilded Age
- Jay Webber (born 1972), assemblyman who has represented the 26th Legislative District since 2008 and had served as chairman of the New Jersey Republican State Committee
- Elizabeth Weed (born 1940), feminist scholar, editor and university administrator who was the co-founder of the Pembroke Center for Teaching and Research on Women
- Ben Weinman (born 1975), of the band The Dillinger Escape Plan
- Arthur Whitney (1871–1942), politician who served in both houses of the New Jersey Legislature and was the Republican nominee for governor of New Jersey in 1925
- Paul Zimmerman (1932–2018), football sportswriter for Sports Illustrated
