= Carol Murphy =

Carol Murphy may refer to:

- Carol J. Murphy (1932–2011), American Republican Party politician in the New Jersey General Assembly
- Carol A. Murphy, American Democratic Party politician in the New Jersey General Assembly
