= Christian Barranco =

Member of the New Jersey General Assembly

Member of the New Jersey General Assembly
- In office January 11, 2022 – January 13, 2026
- Preceded by: BettyLou DeCroce
- Succeeded by: Marisa Sweeney
- Constituency: 26th district (2022–2024); 25th district (2024–2026)

Personal details
- Born: December 31, 1969 (age 56) Paterson, New Jersey, US
- Party: Republican
- Website: Legislative web page

Christian Barranco (born December 31, 1969) is an American politician who served in the New Jersey General Assembly from the 25th district from 2024 to 2026, before which he represented the 26th district after taking office on January 11, 2022. He served on the Pompton Lakes borough council from 2017 to 2019.

== New Jersey General Assembly ==
At the Morris County Republican convention in March 2021, incumbent Jay Webber and Barranco won the party's nomination for the "county line" for Assembly, ahead of incumbent BettyLou DeCroce. Webber and Barranco defeated DeCroce in the June primary for the Republican nomination.

Barranco won the election with his Republican running mate, Jay Webber, defeating Republicans Melissa Brown Blauuer and Pamela Fadden by a margin of almost 14,000 votes.

In the 2021 reapportionment, many municipalities in Morris County were shuffled between districts. As a result, Barranco relocated from the 26th legislative district into the 25th district, while Brian Bergen shifted from the 25th District into the 26th.

Barranco unsuccessfully sought a third term in the Assembly in 2025, losing to Democratic challenger Marisa Sweeney in an upset.

=== Committees ===
Committee assignments for the 2024—2025 Legislative Session were:

- Transportation and Independent Authorities
- Telecommunications and Utilities

== 25th District ==
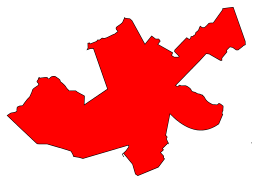
New Jersey's 25th Legislative District (2012-2022 Apportionment)

Each of the 40 districts in the New Jersey Legislature has one representative in the New Jersey Senate and two members in the New Jersey General Assembly. The representatives from the 25th District for the 2024—2025 Legislative Session were:

- Senator Anthony M. Bucco (R)
- Assemblyman Christian Barranco (R)
- Assemblywoman Aura K. Dunn (R)

== Electoral history ==
25th legislative district general election, 2025
| Party | Candidate | Votes | % |
|---|---|---|---|
| Democratic | Marisa Sweeney | 49,918 | 25.6% |
| Republican | Aura K. Dunn (incumbent) | 49,088 | 25.2% |
| Republican | Christian Barranco (incumbent) | 48,125 | 24.7% |
| Democratic | Steve Pylypchuk | 47,723 | 24.5% |
| Total votes | | 194,854 | 100.0% |
| Democratic gain from Republican | | | |
| Republican hold | | | |

25th Legislative District General Election, 2023
| Party | Candidate | Votes | % |
|---|---|---|---|
| Republican | Aura K. Dunn (incumbent) | 26,717 | 26.4 |
| Republican | Christian E. Barranco (incumbent) | 25,988 | 25.7 |
| Democratic | Diane Salvatore | 24,055 | 23.8 |
| Democratic | Jonathan Torres | 24,420 | 24.1 |
| Total votes | | 101,180 | 100.0 |
| Republican hold | | | |
| Republican hold | | | |

26th legislative district general election, 2021
| Party | Candidate | Votes | % |
|---|---|---|---|
| Republican | Jay Webber (incumbent) | 46,239 | 29.98% |
| Republican | Christian E. Barranco | 45,224 | 29.32% |
| Democratic | Pamela Fadden | 31,434 | 20.38% |
| Democratic | Melissa Brown Blaeuer | 31,355 | 20.33% |
| Total votes | | 154,252 | 100.0 |
| Republican hold | | | |
