= Ralph A. Loveys =

American politician

Member of the New Jersey General Assembly from the 26th district
- In office January 10, 1984 – January 10, 1989 Serving with Dean Gallo and Robert Martin
- Preceded by: Leanna Brown
- Succeeded by: Alex DeCroce

Personal details
- Born: April 25, 1929 Chelsea, Massachusetts
- Died: February 22, 2017 (aged 87) West Palm Beach, Florida
- Party: Republican

Ralph A. Loveys (April 25, 1929 – February 22, 2017) was an American Republican Party politician who was elected to three terms in the New Jersey General Assembly, where he represented the 26th Legislative District. In 1988, Loveys was nominated to serve as head of the New Jersey Turnpike Authority by Governor Thomas Kean, but resigned after a year in office when Governor James Florio would not support a toll increase package Loveys had supported.

Loveys was born in Chelsea, Massachusetts and attended Melrose High School, where he was captain of the football team. He went on to Middlebury College, where he was captain of the football team and was selected in the NFL draft by the Green Bay Packers. He served as a captain in the United States Marine Corps during the Korean War.

== Political career ==
Loveys was the son of P. Augustus Loveys and J. Violet Jacobs Lovey. A resident of Florham Park, he served in various elected offices of borough government from 1968 to 1983, including Councilman, Council President, and Mayor. Loveys was first elected to the General Assembly in 1983, where vehicle insurance was one of the major issues he worked on in the legislature. Legislation introduced by Loveys and passed unanimously in the Assembly in June 1985 mandated a redesign of the New Jersey driver's license to allow organ donation information to be entered on the license itself, a proposal that the Transplant Foundation of New Jersey estimated could triple organ donations in the state.

As chairman of the Assembly Insurance Committee, Loveys and Assembly Speaker Chuck Hardwick announced plans in March 1987 to introduce legislation that would cut premium rates for bodily insurance coverage by 36%, yielding a reduction of $90 per year for drivers.

In December 1988, New Jersey Governor Thomas Kean nominated Loveys to succeed Joseph A. Sullivan as chairman of the New Jersey Turnpike Authority, a position that carried no salary. In a statement released about the nomination, Kean said, "Loveys has served with distinction in the Assembly and has taken on some of the most difficult public policy issues our state faces." In January 1989, Alex DeCroce, a member of the Morris County Board of Chosen Freeholders, was named to fill Loveys' vacant seat in the General Assembly. The New Jersey Senate confirmed Loveys' nomination in February 1989.

=== Resignation over toll rates ===
The first wave of toll increases which Loveys proposed in September 1989 was expected to add 40% to the existing toll rates in order to cover the cost of planned road-widening projects, and by 1996 would more than double rates, increasing the cost for a car traveling the full length of the 117 miles (188 km) Turnpike from $2.70 to $6.35 once the full package had been implemented.

Loveys resigned from his position as chairman in February 1990 during a public hearing on proposed toll increases for vehicles using the New Jersey Turnpike, after Governor Jim Florio announced that he was unwilling to support the increases Loveys recommended. The increases were said to be necessary to prevent the Turnpike Authority from being in technical default on billions of dollars in bonds it had issued in 1985 to cover construction costs. Despite his resignation as chairman, Loveys remained a member of the commission that oversaw the Turnpike. Florio's statement accepting Loveys' resignation stated that information coming from Loveys was "confirming our suspicion that management of the Turnpike has left something to be desired". Florio said that he would not allow a toll increase to go through and named commissioner Frank Rogers to serve as acting chairman following Loveys' departure.

== Family ==
Loveys and his wife, Persis, were the parents of James Loveys, who has served three terms as the vice chair of the Parks Committee, is a member of the Landmarks Committee, and is a volunteer in the Recreation Department of Randolph, New Jersey. In September 2010, the younger Loveys was selected to serve out the remaining four months in the term of Randolph Mayor Jay Alpert, who resigned in August.

Loveys died on February 22, 2017.
