= Aura K. Dunn =

Member of the New Jersey General Assembly

Aura Dunn
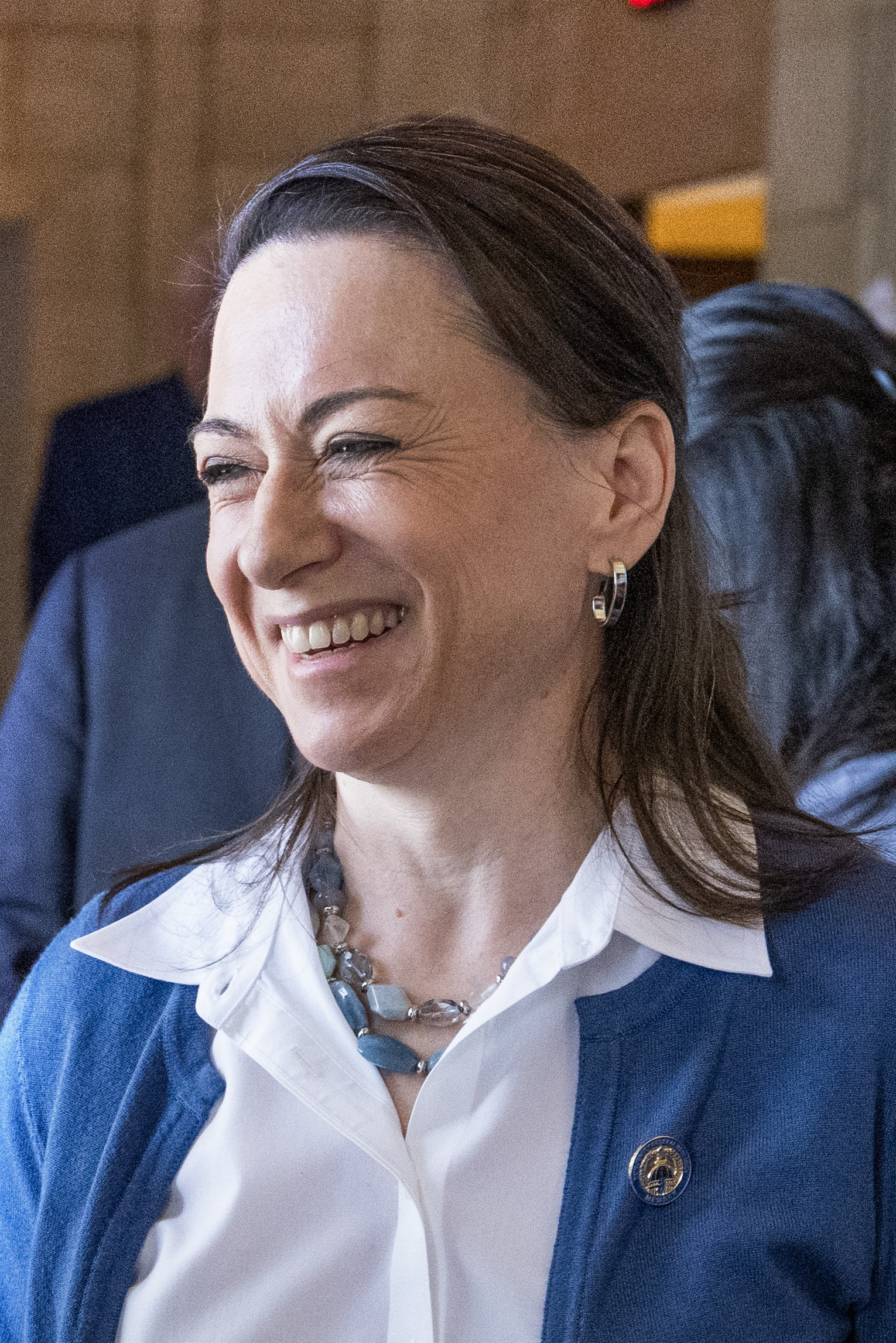

Member of the New Jersey General Assembly from the 25th district
- Incumbent
- Assumed office February 3, 2020 Serving with Brian Bergen (2020-2024); Christian Barranco (2024-2026); Marisa Sweeney (2026-Present)
- Preceded by: Vacant*
- In office November 21, 2019 – January 14, 2020 Serving with Michael Patrick Carroll
- Preceded by: Anthony M. Bucco
- Succeeded by: Vacant*

Personal details
- Born: November 15, 1971 (age 54)
- Party: Republican
- Education: University at Buffalo (BA); George Washington University (MBA)
- Website: Legislative webpage
- *Anthony M. Bucco was elected, but declined to take the seat to stay in the state senate.

Aura Kenny Dunn (born November 15, 1971) is an American Republican Party politician who has represented the 25th Legislative District in the New Jersey General Assembly since February 3, 2020 and previously from November 25, 2019 until January 14, 2020.

She served in the Assembly as the Assistant Minority Whip.

== Education and early career ==
Dunn earned her bachelor's degree in sociology at the State University of New York at Buffalo and was awarded a graduate degree in public administration from George Washington University. Dunn also holds a certificate in Mediation.

She was a budget analyst on education policy for the United States Senate Committee on Appropriations from 1997 to 2000, and a policy advisor for the U.S. House Committee on Veterans Affairs. Dunn later was a lobbyist for America’s Public Television Stations, Sesame Street and Mister Rogers’ Neighborhood and advocated on behalf of these clients to the U.S. Senate. She was the District Director for Rep. Rodney Frelinghuysen (NJ-11) from 2016 to his retirement in 2019.

== New Jersey Assembly ==
Dunn ran for assembly in the 2019 Republican primary losing to Anthony M. Bucco and Brian Bergen.

In September 2019, State Senator Anthony R. Bucco died. His son Assemblyman Anthony M. Bucco was appointed to the Senate seat. Dunn then won a special election convention for Bucco's Assembly seat. She was sworn in on November 25, 2019, serving only until the end of the legislative session on January 14, 2020. After his Senate appointment, Bucco's name was still on the ballot for his Assembly seat, and he won re-election to the Assembly. Dunn was selected in another special convention for that seat on February 1, 2020, was sworn in again on February 3, 2020, and won the subsequent November 2020 special election for the seat.

=== Committee assignments ===
Committee assignments for the 2026—2027 Legislative Session are:

- Higher Education
- Transportation and Independent Authorities

== 25th District ==
Each of the 40 districts in the New Jersey Legislature has one representative in the New Jersey Senate and two members in the New Jersey General Assembly. The representatives from the 25th District for the 2026—2027 Legislative Session are:

- Senator Anthony M. Bucco (R)
- Assemblywoman Aura K. Dunn(R)
- Assemblywoman Marisa Sweeney (D)

== Electoral history ==
=== New Jersey Assembly ===
25th legislative district general election, 2025
Party	Candidate	Votes	%
Democratic	Marisa Sweeney	49,918	25.6%
Republican	Aura K. Dunn (incumbent)	49,088	25.2%
Republican	Christian Barranco (incumbent)	48,125	24.7%
Democratic	Steve Pylypchuk	47,723	24.5%
Total votes		194,854	100.0%
Democratic gain from Republican			
Republican hold			

25th Legislative District General Election, 2023
Party	Candidate	Votes	%
Republican	Aura K. Dunn (incumbent)	26,717	26.4
Republican	Christian E. Barranco (incumbent)	25,988	25.7
Democratic	Diane Salvatore	24,055	23.8
Democratic	Jonathan Torres	24,420	24.1
Total votes		101,180	100.0
Republican hold			
Republican hold			

25th legislative district general election, 2021
Party	Candidate	Votes	%
Republican	Aura K. Dunn (incumbent)	42,183	28.25%
Republican	Brian Bergen (incumbent)	41,584	27.85%
Democratic	Lauren Barnett	33,322	22.31%
Democratic	Patricia L. Veres	32,243	21.59%
Total votes		149,332	100.0
Republican hold			

25th legislative district special election, 2020
Party	Candidate	Votes	%
Republican	Aura K. Dunn (incumbent)	64,469	52.5%
Democratic	Darcy Draeger	58,446	47.5%
Total votes		122,915	100.0
Republican hold			

2019 Special Convention for the 25th District
Party	Candidate	Votes	%	±%
Republican	Aura K. Dunn	133	74%	N/A
Republican	John M. Barabula	24	13%	N/A
Republican	Sarah Neibart	13	7%	N/A
Republican	Alison Deeb	5	2%	N/A
Republican	Al Reibero	4	2%	N/A
Total votes		'179'	'100.0'	

== Personal life ==
Dunn lives in Mendham Borough with her husband and their three children.

Dunn served on the boards of Morris Habitat for Humanity and Morris County Mental Health Addictions Services. She volunteers as a JBWS-certified domestic violence crisis response team member for local police departments. Since 2010, her family has hosted a New York City child each summer through the Fresh Air Fund program.
