= BettyLou DeCroce =

Member of the New Jersey General Assembly

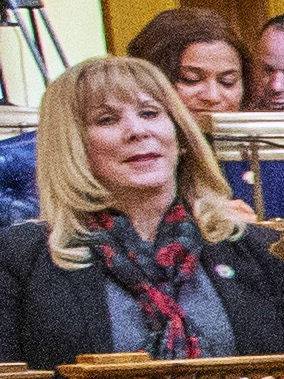

Member of the New Jersey General Assembly from the 26th district
- In office January 25, 2012 – January 11, 2022 Serving with Jay Webber
- Preceded by: Alex DeCroce
- Succeeded by: Christian Barranco

Personal details
- Born: Betty Lou Bisson; November 17, 1952 (age 73)
- Party: Republican
- Spouse(s): Alex DeCroce (1994–2012; his death)
- Children: 2

BettyLou DeCroce (born November 17, 1952) is an American Republican Party politician, who served in the New Jersey General Assembly from 2012 to 2022, where she represented the 26th Legislative District.

== Biography and early career ==
Born and raised in Dover, DeCroce is a realtor who formerly served as the President of the firm ERA Gallo & DeCroce, Inc. She attended Berkeley College and Rutgers University.

A member of the Township Council in Mine Hill Township from 1981 to 1983, DeCroce later served on the Roxbury Township Planning Board from 1984 to 1987. In 1991, she was hired by the township to serve as its Deputy Township Manager from 1991 through 2002 and as its Township Clerk from 1988 to 2010.

In 2010, she was appointed Deputy Commissioner in the New Jersey Department of Community Affairs, a position she held until 2012. During this time, she authored the Best Practices for Municipalities, which became a statewide model for identifying efficiencies in local government for reducing property taxes.

DeCroce has served on the Morris County Joint Insurance Fund and was the North Jersey Health Insurance Fund Commissioner.

She married Alex DeCroce, who had been in the Assembly for two terms, in 1994. She currently resides in Parsippany-Troy Hills and has two sons and four grandchildren.

== New Jersey Assembly ==
Alex DeCroce, who had served in the Assembly since 1993, died suddenly on January 9, 2012, at the age of 75, shortly after the 214th Legislature had ended.

On January 25, 2012, BettyLou DeCroce was selected by the Morris County Republican Committee to replace him in the Assembly, defeating former Kinnelon Councilman Larry Casha by a nearly 2-1 margin. She won a November 2012 special election for the remainder of the term, defeating Democratic candidate Joseph Raich.

On June 8, 2021, DeCroce lost her reelection bid to former Pompton Lakes Councilman Christian Barranco.

=== Committee assignments ===
- Financial Institutions and Insurance
- Science, Innovation and Technology
- Transportation and Independent Authorities
- Joint Committee on the Public Schools
- New Jersey Legislative Select Oversight
- Intergovernmental Relations Commission
- Manufacturing Caucus

== Electoral history ==
=== New Jersey Assembly ===
New Jersey general election, 2017
Party	Candidate	Votes	%	±%
Republican	Jay Webber	31,810	28.2	▼2.1
Republican	BettyLou DeCroce	31,766	28.2	▼1.9
Democratic	Joseph R. Raich	24,732	22.0	▲2.6
Democratic	E. William Edge	24,362	21.6	▲2.8
Total votes		'112,670'	'100.0'	

New Jersey general election, 2015
Party	Candidate	Votes	%	±%
Republican	Jay Webber	13,739	30.3	▼2.3
Republican	BettyLou DeCroce	13,666	30.1	▼2.8
Democratic	Avery Hart	8,805	19.4	▲2.0
Democratic	Wayne B. Marek	8,525	18.8	▲1.7
Green	Jimmy D. Brash	666	1.5	N/A
Total votes		'45,401'	'100.0'	

New Jersey general election, 2013
Party	Candidate	Votes	%	±%
Republican	BettyLou DeCroce	35,352	32.9	▲0.9
Republican	Jay Webber	35,028	32.6	▲1.2
Democratic	Elliot Isibor	18,720	17.4	▲0.6
Democratic	Joseph Raich	18,379	17.1	▼0.5
Total votes		'107,479'	'100.0'	

Special election, November 6, 2012
Party	Candidate	Votes	%
Republican	Betty Lou DeCroce	51,485	60.5
Democratic	Joseph R. Raich	33,618	39.5
Total votes		85,103	100.0

New Jersey General Assembly
Preceded by Alex DeCroce	Member of the New Jersey General Assembly for the 26th District; January 25, 2012 – January 11, 2022; With: Jay Webber	Succeeded by Christian Barranco
