= Jay Webber =

Member of the New Jersey General Assembly

Member of the New Jersey General Assembly from the 26th district
- Incumbent
- Assumed office January 8, 2008 Serving with Alex DeCroce (2008–2012); BettyLou DeCroce (2012–2022); Christian Barranco (2022–2024); Brian Bergen (2024–present)
- Preceded by: Joseph Pennacchio

Chairman of the New Jersey Republican State Committee
- In office June 17, 2009 – January 11, 2011
- Preceded by: Tom Wilson
- Succeeded by: Sam Raia

Personal details
- Born: February 29, 1972 (age 54) Teaneck, New Jersey, U.S.
- Party: Republican
- Spouse: Johanna
- Children: 8
- Education: Johns Hopkins University (BA); Harvard University (JD)
- Website: Legislative Website

James K. "Jay" Webber (born February 29, 1972) is an American lawyer and Republican politician, who has served in the New Jersey General Assembly since January 8, 2008, where he represents the 26th legislative district. Webber served in the Assembly as the Minority Appropriations Officer from 2018 to 2026.

After the 2025 New Jersey General Assembly election, in which Republicans saw five incumbents lose and for the party to shrink to its smallest Assembly delegation since the post-Watergate era, Webber was not given a leadership position by the party caucus, which he claims was related to his efforts to question the nature of the election losses.

== Early life and education ==
Webber was born in Teaneck, New Jersey. Raised in Clifton, he attended Saint Joseph Regional High School. He received a B.A. in International Studies from Johns Hopkins University, where he was Phi Beta Kappa and a Second Team All-American in baseball. He served as Budget Staffer and District Director to William J. Martini during his term in Congress. After leaving Congressman Martini's office, Webber was a staff member at the Manhattan Institute. Webber earned a J.D. from Harvard Law School and clerked for New Jersey Supreme Court justice Peter Verniero.

== New Jersey Senate campaign ==
At age 30 in 2003, Webber ran in the Republican primary against incumbent state senator Robert Martin by running to the right of the senator. Martin defeated Webber by approximately 1,900 votes or 15 percent.

== New Jersey Assembly ==
In 2007, following Martin's retirement from the Senate and incumbent Assemblyman Joseph Pennacchio deciding to run for Martin's seat, Webber ran in the Republican primary for Pennacchio's Assembly seat. Incumbent Alex DeCroce took the most votes in the June primary (9,833 votes or 41.1%) while Webber advanced to the November general election by coming in second (7,679 votes, 32.2%) defeating Kinnelon councilman Larry Casha (6,369 votes, 26.7%). Webber was elected in the general election and has subsequently been re-elected every two years since then.

=== Committees ===
Committee assignments for the 2026—2027 Legislative Session are:

- Appropriations
- Financial Institutions and Insurance

=== District 26 ===
Each of the 40 districts in the New Jersey Legislature has one representative in the New Jersey Senate and two members in the New Jersey General Assembly. The representatives from the 26th District for the 2026—2027 Legislative Session are:

- Senator Joseph Pennacchio (R)
- Assemblyman Brian Bergen (R)
- Assemblyman Jay Webber (R)

== New Jersey Republican Party chairmanship ==
On June 11, 2009, Republican gubernatorial candidate Chris Christie announced his selection of Webber to succeed Tom Wilson as chairman of the New Jersey Republican State Committee. State Committee members unanimously supported the selection of Webber in a vote on June 17, 2009. Webber announced that he would be leaving the Chairman's post in January 2011, and was succeeded by Sam Raia.

== 2018 U.S. House campaign ==
On February 3, 2018, Webber announced he would officially run for the U.S. House seat representing New Jersey's 11th congressional district, after incumbent Rodney Frelinghuysen announced on January 29 that he would not seek reelection. Webber received the Republican Party nomination in the June 6 primary election, defeating Anthony Ghee and Peter DeNeufville. He was defeated by Democratic nominee Mikie Sherrill in the November general election. Sherrill won 56.2% of the vote to Webber's 42.7%, defeating him by 13.5%, a 33 percentage-point shift in the vote share towards the Democrat compared to the last election. It was the largest partisan swing of any district in the 2018 House Elections.

== Personal life ==
He is married to Johanna, with whom he has eight children. He is a resident of Morris Plains. He owns a law firm based in Whippany.

== Electoral history ==
=== General Assembly ===
26th Legislative District General Election, 2023
Party	Candidate	Votes	%
Republican	Jay Webber (incumbent)	28,146	28.7
Republican	Brian Bergen (incumbent)	27,831	28.3
Democratic	John Van Achen	21,263	21.7
Democratic	Walter Mielarczyk	20,962	21.4
Total votes		98,202	100.0
Republican hold			
Republican hold			

26th Legislative District General Election, 2021
Party	Candidate	Votes	%
Republican	Jay Webber (incumbent)	46,239	29.98%
Republican	Christian E. Barranco	45,224	29.32%
Democratic	Pamela Fadden	31,434	20.38%
Democratic	Melissa Brown Blaeuer	31,355	20.33%
Total votes		154,252	100.0
Republican hold			

26th Legislative District General Election, 2019
Party	Candidate	Votes	%
Republican	BettyLou DeCroce (incumbent)	24,706	28.5%
Republican	Jay Webber (incumbent)	24,451	28.21%
Democratic	Christine Clarke	18,813	21.7%
Democratic	Laura Fortgang	18,711	21.59%
Total votes		86,681	100%
Republican hold			

New Jersey general election, 2017
Party	Candidate	Votes	%	±%
Republican	Jay Webber	31,810	28.2	▼2.1
Republican	BettyLou DeCroce	31,766	28.2	▼1.9
Democratic	Joseph R. Raich	24,732	22.0	▲2.6
Democratic	E. William Edge	24,362	21.6	▲2.8
Total votes		'112,670'	'100.0'	

New Jersey general election, 2015
Party	Candidate	Votes	%	±%
Republican	Jay Webber	13,739	30.3	▼2.3
Republican	BettyLou DeCroce	13,666	30.1	▼2.8
Democratic	Avery Hart	8,805	19.4	▲2.0
Democratic	Wayne B. Marek	8,525	18.8	▲1.7
Green	Jimmy D. Brash	666	1.5	N/A
Total votes		'45,401'	'100.0'	

New Jersey general election, 2013
Party	Candidate	Votes	%	±%
Republican	BettyLou DeCroce	35,352	32.9	▲0.9
Republican	Jay Webber	35,028	32.6	▲1.2
Democratic	Elliot Isibor	18,720	17.4	▲0.6
Democratic	Joseph Raich	18,379	17.1	▼0.5
Total votes		'107,479'	'100.0'	

New Jersey general election, 2011
Party	Candidate	Votes	%
Republican	Alex DeCroce	19,696	32.0
Republican	Jay Webber	19,543	31.8
Democratic	Joseph Raich	10,847	17.6
Democratic	Elliot Isibor	10,319	16.8
Green	Michael Spector	1,095	1.8
Total votes		61,500	100.0

New Jersey general election, 2009
Party	Candidate	Votes	%	±%
Republican	Alex DeCroce	43,647	34.7	▲2.6
Republican	Jay Webber	42,077	33.4	▲2.6
Democratic	Wayne B. Marek	20,107	16.0	▼0.9
Democratic	Douglas Herbert	20,015	15.9	▼1.2
Total votes		'125,846'	'100.0'	

New Jersey general election, 2007
Party	Candidate	Votes	%	±%
Republican	Alex DeCroce	25,342	32.1	▲1.9
Republican	Jay Webber	24,307	30.8	▲1.7
Democratic	David Modrak	13,488	17.1	▼3.0
Democratic	Wayne Marek	13,308	16.9	▼2.5
Green	Michael Spector	971	1.2	N/A
Green	Matthew Norton	935	1.2	N/A
Libertarian	Kenneth Kaplan	577	0.7	▲0.1
Total votes		'78,928'	'100.0'	

=== United States House of Representatives ===
New Jersey's 11th congressional district, 2018
Party	Candidate	Votes	%
Democratic	Mikie Sherrill	183,684	56.8
Republican	Jay Webber	136,322	42.1
Independent	Robert Crook	2,182	0.7
Libertarian	Ryan Martinez	1,386	0.4
Total votes		323,574	100.0
Democratic gain from Republican			

New Jersey General Assembly
Preceded by Joseph Pennacchio	Member of the New Jersey General Assembly from the 26th district January 8, 2008–present Served alongside: Alex DeCroce, BettyLou DeCroce, Christian Barranco	Incumbent
Party political offices
Preceded by Tom Wilson	Chair of the New Jersey Republican Party; June 11, 2009–January 11, 2011	Succeeded by Sam Raia
