= New Jersey's 26th legislative district =

American legislative district

- Senator: Joseph Pennacchio (R)
- Assembly members: Brian Bergen (R); Jay Webber (R)
- Registration: 35.6% Republican; 28.1% Democratic; 35.3% unaffiliated
- Demographics: 71.1% White; 2.4% Black/African American; 0.2% Native American; 15.1% Asian; 0.0% Hawaiian/Pacific Islander; 3.4% Other race; 7.7% Two or more races; 10.3% Hispanic
- Population: 224,584
- Voting-age population: 179,363
- Registered voters: 178,510

New Jersey's 26th legislative district is one of 40 in the New Jersey Legislature. The district includes the Morris County municipalities of Boonton, Denville, East Hanover, Florham Park, Hanover, Lincoln Park, Montville, Morris Plains, Mountain Lakes, Pequannock, Parsippany-Troy Hills, and Riverdale; and the Passaic County municipalities of Bloomingdale, Pompton Lakes, Ringwood, and Wanaque.

== Demographic characteristics ==
As of the 2020 United States census, the district had a population of 224,584, of whom 179,363 (79.9%) were of voting age. The racial makeup of the district was 159,789 (71.1%) White, 5,396 (2.4%) African American, 494 (0.2%) Native American, 33,908 (15.1%) Asian, 49 (0.0%) Pacific Islander, 7,733 (3.4%) from some other race, and 17,215 (7.7%) from two or more races. Hispanic or Latino people of any race were 23,197 (10.3%) of the population.

The 26th district had 178,951 registered voters as of February 1, 2025 of whom 63,088 (35.3%) were registered as unaffiliated, 63,736 (35.6%) were registered as Republicans, 50,389 (28.1%) were registered as Democrats, and 1,738 (1.0%) were registered to other parties.

The Asian population was above the state average, while there were relatively few African American and Hispanic residents in the district. The percentage of children receiving Temporary Assistance for Needy Families was the fourth lowest of any district and the percentage of the population age 65 and over was eighth highest. The district had one of the lowest percentages in the state of registered Democrats, with Republicans outnumbering Democrats by a more than 2–1 margin.

== Political representation ==
For the 2026–2027 session, the 26th legislative district of the New Jersey Legislature is represented in the State Senate by Joseph Pennacchio (R, Rockaway Township) and in the General Assembly by Brian Bergen (R, Denville Township) and Jay Webber (R, Morris Plains).

The legislative district is located within New Jersey's 11th congressional district and New Jersey's 5th congressional district.

== Apportionment history ==
The 26th district, when it was created in 1973, along with the 40-district legislative map, was based in the urban area around The Oranges, specifically West Orange, Orange, East Orange, and a small sliver of the North Ward of Newark. In the 1981 redistricting, the district moved out of Essex County and was routed along the eastern border of Morris County from Chatham Township to Kinnelon including Parsippany-Troy Hills and Morris Plains and northern Passaic County's West Milford and Ringwood. Following the 1991 redistricting, Chatham Township was removed but Madison and Mountain Lakes were added in Morris County; in Passaic County, however, West Milford and Ringwood were shifted to the 40th district, Bloomingdale and Pompton Lakes instead made up the Passaic portion of the district during this decade. West Caldwell, Caldwell, and Fairfield Township in Essex Count were now included within the district.

Changes to the district made in the 2001 legislative apportionment based on the results of the 2000 United States census added Hanover Township (from the 25th district) and West Milford Township (from the 40th district) and removed Madison Borough (to the 21st district), Mountain Lakes (to the 25th district) and Fairfield Township and West Caldwell Township (to the 27th district). Changes to the district made as part of the 2011 apportionment include the addition of Fairfield Township (from the 27th district), Jefferson Township (from the 25th district), North Caldwell Borough (from the 27th district), Rockaway Township (from the 25th district), Verona Township (from the 40th district) and West Caldwell Township (from the 27th district). The 2011 apportionment removed Bloomingdale (to the 39th district), Chatham Borough (to the 21st district), East Hanover, Florham Park, and Hanover Township (to the 27th district), Pequannock Township, Pompton Lakes Borough, and Riverdale (to the 40th district).

In the 1977 Democratic primary for the Senate seat, incumbent Frank J. Dodd faced opposition from Assemblyman Eldridge Hawkins and tennis star Althea Gibson, who was serving as state Athletic Commissioner. Dodd was supported by the Essex County Democratic organization under County Chairman Harry Lerner. With Gibson and Hawkins splitting the anti-organization vote, Dodd won the nomination and the subsequent general election.

In 1983, Leanna Brown challenged her former running mate, James P. Vreeland, for the Republican nomination for State Senate in the Republican primary in what the Philadelphia Daily News described as a "stunning upset" and was elected to the State Senate, becoming the first woman from the Republican Party to serve in the upper house of the State Legislature. In 1993, Brown resigned from the Senate after she was appointed to the New Jersey Casino Control Commission, initially to serve out the unexpired term of Charles J. Irwin. Assemblymember Robert Martin was chosen to fill Brown's vacancy in the Senate.

In December 1988, Governor of New Jersey Thomas Kean nominated Ralph A. Loveys to succeed Joseph A. Sullivan as the chairman of the New Jersey Turnpike Authority. In January 1989, Alex DeCroce, a member of the Morris County Board of Chosen Freeholders, was named to fill Loveys' vacant seat in the General Assembly.

Carol J. Murphy was nominated in February 2001 to serve on the New Jersey Board of Public Utilities by acting governor of New Jersey Donald DiFrancesco. In February 2001, a special convention of district Republicans chose Joseph Pennacchio to fill the General Assembly seat vacated by Murphy. Alex DeCroce died on January 9, 2012, after collapsing in a bathroom inside the Statehouse, just moments after the 214th Legislature held its final voting session. On January 25, 2012, his widow, BettyLou DeCroce, was selected by the Morris County Republican Committee to replace him in the Assembly until a November 2012 special election was held. She won the special election and subsequent general elections running with Jay Webber. On June 8, 2021, DeCroce lost her reelection bid to former Pompton Lakes councilman Christian Barranco. Following the 2021 reapportionment, new municipalities comprised 58% of the reconfigured district. Barranco, who since moved to Jefferson Township, ran for reelection in the 25th district and incumbent 25th district Assemblyman Brian Bergen (a resident of Denville) ran successfully for reelection in the 26th in 2023.

== Election history ==
Session	Senate	General Assembly	
1974–1975	Frank J. Dodd (D)	Richard Codey (D)	Eldridge Hawkins (D)
1976–1977	Frank J. Dodd (D)	Richard Codey (D)	Eldridge Hawkins (D)
1978–1979	Frank J. Dodd (D)	Richard Codey (D)	Mildred Barry Garvin (D)
1980–1981	Frank J. Dodd (D)	Richard Codey (D)	Mildred Barry Garvin (D)
1982–1983	James P. Vreeland (R)	Leanna Brown (R)	Dean Gallo (R)
1984–1985	Leanna Brown (R)	Ralph A. Loveys (R)	Dean Gallo (R) (Note: Resigned December 6, 1984, following his election to Congress)
1984–1985	Leanna Brown (R)	Ralph A. Loveys (R)	Robert Martin (R) (Note: Elected to the Assembly in January 1985 special election, sworn in on February 4, 1985)
1986–1987	Leanna Brown (R)	Ralph A. Loveys (R)	Robert Martin (R)
1988–1989	Leanna Brown (R)	Ralph A. Loveys (R) (Note: Resigned January 10, 1989, to become Chairman of the New Jersey Turnpike Authority)	Robert Martin (R)
1988–1989	Leanna Brown (R)	Alex DeCroce (R) (Note: Appointed to the Assembly on January 28, 1989)	Robert Martin (R)
1990–1991	Leanna Brown (R)	Alex DeCroce (R)	Robert Martin (R)
1992–1993	Leanna Brown (R) (Note: Resigned July 7, 1993, to join the New Jersey Casino Control Commission)	Alex DeCroce (R)	Robert Martin (R) (Note: Appointed to the Senate on August 16, 1993)
1992–1993	Robert Martin (R)	Alex DeCroce (R)	Carol J. Murphy (R) (Note: Appointed to the Assembly on September 13, 1993)
1994–1995	Robert Martin (R)	Alex DeCroce (R)	Carol J. Murphy (R)
1996–1997	Robert Martin (R)	Alex DeCroce (R)	Carol J. Murphy (R)
1998–1999	Robert Martin (R)	Alex DeCroce (R)	Carol J. Murphy (R)
2000–2001	Robert Martin (R)	Alex DeCroce (R)	Carol J. Murphy (R) (Note: Resigned February 13, 2001, to become a Board of Public Utilities commissioner)
2000–2001	Robert Martin (R)	Alex DeCroce (R)	Joseph Pennacchio (R) (Note: Appointed to the Assembly on February 25, 2001)
2002–2003	Robert Martin (R)	Alex DeCroce (R)	Joseph Pennacchio (R)
2004–2005	Robert Martin (R)	Alex DeCroce (R)	Joseph Pennacchio (R)
2006–2007	Robert Martin (R)	Alex DeCroce (R)	Joseph Pennacchio (R)
2008–2009	Joseph Pennacchio (R)	Alex DeCroce (R)	Jay Webber (R)
2010–2011	Joseph Pennacchio (R)	Alex DeCroce (R) (Note: Died January 9, 2012)	Jay Webber (R)
2012–2013	Joseph Pennacchio (R)	BettyLou DeCroce (R) (Note: Appointed to the Assembly on January 25, 2012, won November 6, 2012 special election to complete term)	Jay Webber (R)
2014–2015	Joseph Pennacchio (R)	BettyLou DeCroce (R)	Jay Webber (R)
2016–2017	Joseph Pennacchio (R)	BettyLou DeCroce (R)	Jay Webber (R)
2018–2019	Joseph Pennacchio (R)	BettyLou DeCroce (R)	Jay Webber (R)
2020–2021	Joseph Pennacchio (R)	BettyLou DeCroce (R)	Jay Webber (R)
2022–2023	Joseph Pennacchio (R)	Christian Barranco (R)	Jay Webber (R)
2024–2025	Joseph Pennacchio (R)	Brian Bergen (R)	Jay Webber (R)
2026–2027	Joseph Pennacchio (R)	Brian Bergen (R)	Jay Webber (R)

== Election results ==
=== Senate ===
2023 New Jersey general election
Party	Candidate	Votes	%	±%
Republican	Joseph Pennacchio	28,313	56.8	▼2.1
Democratic	Joan Waks	21,571	43.2	▲2.1
Total votes		49,884	100.0	

2021 New Jersey general election
Party	Candidate	Votes	%	±%
Republican	Joseph Pennacchio	46,057	58.9	▲2.4
Democratic	Christine Clarke	32,087	41.1	▼2.4
Total votes		78,144	100.0	

New Jersey general election, 2017
Party	Candidate	Votes	%	±%
Republican	Joseph Pennacchio	32,269	56.5	▼8.5
Democratic	Elliot Isibor	24,867	43.5	▲8.5
Total votes		57,136	100.0	

New Jersey general election, 2013
Party	Candidate	Votes	%	±%
Republican	Joseph Pennacchio	35,772	65.0	▲0.7
Democratic	Avery Ann Hart	19,250	35.0	▲2.2
Total votes		55,022	100.0	

2011 New Jersey general election
Party	Candidate	Votes	%
Republican	Joseph Pennacchio	20,230	64.3
Democratic	Wasim Khan	10,317	32.8
Scafa For Senate	Joseph Scafa	913	2.9
Total votes		31,460	100.0

2007 New Jersey general election
Party	Candidate	Votes	%	±%
Republican	Joseph Pennacchio	26,567	66.4	▲0.4
Democratic	Wasim A. Khan	13,442	33.6	▼0.4
Total votes		40,009	100.0	

2003 New Jersey general election
Party	Candidate	Votes	%	±%
Republican	Robert J. Martin	21,733	66.0	▲0.1
Democratic	Daniel L. Grant	11,216	34.0	▼0.1
Total votes		32,949	100.0	

2001 New Jersey general election
Party	Candidate	Votes	%
Republican	Robert J. Martin	38,779	65.9
Democratic	Paul E. Pinney	20,090	34.1
Total votes		58,869	100.0

1997 New Jersey general election
Party	Candidate	Votes	%	±%
Republican	Robert J. Martin	43,994	92.6	▲23.2
Conservative	Virginia P. Bauer	3,505	7.4	N/A
Total votes		47,499	100.0	

1993 New Jersey general election
Party	Candidate	Votes	%	±%
Republican	Robert J. Martin	45,217	69.4	▼8.8
Democratic	E. Drew Britcher	19,935	30.6	▲8.8
Total votes		65,152	100.0	

1991 New Jersey general election
Party	Candidate	Votes	%
Republican	Leanna Brown	34,063	78.2
Democratic	Drew Britcher	9,514	21.8
Total votes		43,577	100.0

1987 New Jersey general election
Party	Candidate	Votes	%	±%
Republican	Leanna Brown	25,260	74.1	▲5.9
Democratic	Helen Litwin	8,839	25.9	▼5.9
Total votes		34,099	100.0	

1983 New Jersey general election
Party	Candidate	Votes	%	±%
Republican	Leanna Brown	24,348	68.2	▼1.7
Democratic	Anthony Calvino	11,342	31.8	▲1.7
Total votes		35,690	100.0	

1981 New Jersey general election
Party	Candidate	Votes	%
Republican	James P. Vreeland	38,141	69.9
Democratic	Benjamin Steltzer	16,414	30.1
Total votes		54,555	100.0

1977 New Jersey general election
Party	Candidate	Votes	%	±%
Democratic	Frank J. Dodd	27,293	75.0	▼0.1
Republican	Nancy Jane Schron	8,847	24.3	▼0.6
Libertarian	Kenneth R. Kaplan	250	0.7	N/A
Total votes		36,390	100.0	

1973 New Jersey general election
Party	Candidate	Votes	%
Democratic	Frank J. Dodd	33,223	75.1
Republican	Salvatore J. Beninati	11,012	24.9
Total votes		44,235	100.0

=== General Assembly ===
2023 New Jersey general election
Party	Candidate	Votes	%	±%
Republican	Jay Webber	28,146	28.7	▼1.3
Republican	Brian Bergen	27,831	28.3	▼1.0
Democratic	John Van Achen	21,263	21.7	▲1.3
Democratic	Walter Mielarczyk	20,962	21.4	▲1.1
Total votes		98,202	100.0	

2021 New Jersey general election
Party	Candidate	Votes	%	±%
Republican	Jay Webber	46,239	30.0	▲1.9
Republican	Christian E. Barranco	45,224	29.3	▲0.9
Democratic	Pamela Fadden	31,434	20.4	▼1.4
Democratic	Melissa Brown Blaeuer	31,355	20.3	▼1.4
Total votes		154,252	100.0	

2019 New Jersey general election
Party	Candidate	Votes	%	±%
Republican	BettyLou DeCroce	25,460	28.4	▲0.2
Republican	Jay Webber	25,233	28.1	▼0.1
Democratic	Christine Clarke	19,602	21.8	▼0.2
Democratic	Laura Fortgang	19,507	21.7	▲0.1
Total votes		89,802	100.0	

New Jersey general election, 2017
Party	Candidate	Votes	%	±%
Republican	Jay Webber	31,810	28.2	▼2.1
Republican	BettyLou DeCroce	31,766	28.2	▼1.9
Democratic	Joseph R. Raich	24,732	22.0	▲2.6
Democratic	E. William Edge	24,362	21.6	▲2.8
Total votes		112,670	100.0	

New Jersey general election, 2015
Party	Candidate	Votes	%	±%
Republican	Jay Webber	13,739	30.3	▼2.3
Republican	BettyLou DeCroce	13,666	30.1	▼2.8
Democratic	Avery Hart	8,805	19.4	▲2.0
Democratic	Wayne B. Marek	8,525	18.8	▲1.7
Green	Jimmy D. Brash	666	1.5	N/A
Total votes		45,401	100.0	

New Jersey general election, 2013
Party	Candidate	Votes	%	±%
Republican	BettyLou DeCroce	35,352	32.9	▲0.9
Republican	Jay Webber	35,028	32.6	▲1.2
Democratic	Elliot Isibor	18,720	17.4	▲0.6
Democratic	Joseph Raich	18,379	17.1	▼0.5
Total votes		107,479	100.0	

Special election, November 6, 2012
Party	Candidate	Votes	%
Republican	Betty Lou DeCroce	51,485	60.5
Democratic	Joseph R. Raich	33,618	39.5
Total votes		85,103	100.0

New Jersey general election, 2011
Party	Candidate	Votes	%
Republican	Alex DeCroce	19,696	32.0
Republican	Jay Webber	19,543	31.8
Democratic	Joseph Raich	10,847	17.6
Democratic	Elliot Isibor	10,319	16.8
Green	Michael Spector	1,095	1.8
Total votes		61,500	100.0

New Jersey general election, 2009
Party	Candidate	Votes	%	±%
Republican	Alex DeCroce	43,647	34.7	▲2.6
Republican	Jay Webber	42,077	33.4	▲2.6
Democratic	Wayne B. Marek	20,107	16.0	▼0.9
Democratic	Douglas Herbert	20,015	15.9	▼1.2
Total votes		125,846	100.0	

New Jersey general election, 2007
Party	Candidate	Votes	%	±%
Republican	Alex DeCroce	25,342	32.1	▲1.9
Republican	Jay Webber	24,307	30.8	▲1.7
Democratic	David Modrak	13,488	17.1	▼3.0
Democratic	Wayne Marek	13,308	16.9	▼2.5
Green	Michael Spector	971	1.2	N/A
Green	Matthew Norton	935	1.2	N/A
Libertarian	Kenneth Kaplan	577	0.7	▲0.1
Total votes		78,928	100.0	

New Jersey general election, 2005
Party	Candidate	Votes	%	±%
Republican	Alex DeCroce	35,646	30.2	▼2.5
Republican	Joseph Pennacchio	34,331	29.1	▼3.1
Democratic	Kathleen Lynch-McCabe	23,795	20.1	▲2.2
Democratic	Avery Hart	22,881	19.4	▲2.2
Libertarian	Anthony Pio Costa	833	0.7	N/A
Libertarian	Kenneth Kaplan	660	0.6	N/A
Total votes		118,146	100.0	

New Jersey general election, 2003
Party	Candidate	Votes	%	±%
Republican	Alex DeCroce	20,882	32.7	▼1.5
Republican	Joseph Pennacchio	20,609	32.2	▼0.2
Democratic	Laurie Fierro	11,467	17.9	▲1.0
Democratic	Patrick J. Caserta	10,972	17.2	▲0.8
Total votes		63,930	100.0	

New Jersey general election, 2001
Party	Candidate	Votes	%
Republican	Alex DeCroce	39,381	34.2
Republican	Joseph Pennacchio	37,251	32.4
Democratic	Joseph Raich	19,491	16.9
Democratic	Sergio Bio	18,870	16.4
Total votes		114,993	100.0

New Jersey general election, 1999
Party	Candidate	Votes	%	±%
Republican	Carol J. Murphy	19,150	33.1	▼1.5
Republican	Alex DeCroce	19,054	33.0	▼1.1
Democratic	Robert Dombrowski	9,027	15.6	▲1.4
Democratic	Michael J. Butchko	8,964	15.5	▲1.4
Conservative	Stephen A. Bauer	793	1.4	▼0.1
Conservative	Martin J. McGrath	789	1.4	▼0.1
Total votes		57,777	100.0	

New Jersey general election, 1997
Party	Candidate	Votes	%	±%
Republican	Carol J. Murphy	41,044	34.6	▲1.0
Republican	Alex DeCroce	40,469	34.1	▲0.6
Democratic	Daniel L. Grant	16,891	14.2	▼1.3
Democratic	Michael B. McGlynn	16,787	14.1	▼1.1
Conservative	Stephen A. Bauer	1,793	1.5	▼0.6
Conservative	Martin J. McGrath	1,729	1.5	N/A
Total votes		118,713	100.0	

New Jersey general election, 1995
Party	Candidate	Votes	%	±%
Republican	Carol J. Murphy	22,041	33.6	▼1.2
Republican	Alex DeCroce	21,988	33.5	▼0.4
Democratic	Paul M. Olinski	10,182	15.5	▼0.5
Democratic	Jere E. Cole, Jr.	9,950	15.2	▼0.1
Conservative	Stephen A. Bauer	1,405	2.1	N/A
Total votes		65,566	100.0	

New Jersey general election, 1993
Party	Candidate	Votes	%	±%
Republican	Carol J. Murphy	45,593	34.8	▼2.8
Republican	Alex DeCroce	44,461	33.9	▼3.7
Democratic	Lorelei N. Mottese	21,013	16.0	▲3.9
Democratic	Daniel G. Tauriello	20,014	15.3	▲3.9
Total votes		131,081	100.0	

1991 New Jersey general election
Party	Candidate	Votes	%
Republican	Robert J. Martin	32,337	37.6
Republican	Alex DeCroce	32,303	37.6
Democratic	Patricia Pilson Scott	10,363	12.1
Democratic	Jerry Vitiello	9,809	11.4
Populist	Richard Hrazanek	1,078	1.3
Total votes		85,890	100.0

1989 New Jersey general election
Party	Candidate	Votes	%	±%
Republican	Robert J. Martin	32,631	32.2	▼2.2
Republican	Alex DeCroce	32,583	32.2	▼1.6
Democratic	Carlton W. Hansen, Jr.	18,094	17.9	▲1.5
Democratic	Fred Liebhauser	17,969	17.7	▲2.3
Total votes		101,277	100.0	

1987 New Jersey general election
Party	Candidate	Votes	%	±%
Republican	Robert J. Martin	22,915	34.4	▼3.2
Republican	Ralph A. Loveys	22,475	33.8	▼3.7
Democratic	Drew Britcher	10,936	16.4	▲3.8
Democratic	Paul E. Nagel	10,232	15.4	▲3.1
Total votes		66,558	100.0	

1985 New Jersey general election
Party	Candidate	Votes	%	±%
Republican	Robert J. Martin	31,943	37.6	▲1.4
Republican	Ralph A. Loveys	31,898	37.5	▲4.7
Democratic	Claude C. Post	10,697	12.6	▼3.0
Democratic	Joseph V. Vender	10,425	12.3	▼3.1
Total votes		84,963	100.0	

Special election, January 22, 1985
Party	Candidate	Votes	%
Republican	Robert J. Martin	8,044	69.9
Democratic	Joseph V. Vender	3,471	30.1
Total votes		11,515	100.0

New Jersey general election, 1983
Party	Candidate	Votes	%	±%
Republican	Dean A. Gallo	24,941	36.2	0.0
Republican	Ralph A. Loveys	22,561	32.8	▼2.6
Democratic	Daniel L. Grant	10,713	15.6	▲1.1
Democratic	Carole M. Carp	10,590	15.4	▲1.4
Total votes		68,805	100.0	

New Jersey general election, 1981
Party	Candidate	Votes	%
Republican	Dean A. Gallo	38,419	36.2
Republican	Leanna Brown	37,568	35.4
Democratic	Howard Scott	15,438	14.5
Democratic	Marian Green	14,833	14.0
Total votes		106,258	100.0

New Jersey general election, 1979
Party	Candidate	Votes	%	±%
Democratic	Richard J. Codey	14,320	36.1	▼0.2
Democratic	Mildred Barry Garvin	12,910	32.5	▼0.7
Republican	Leonard P. Messina, Sr.	6,079	15.3	▼0.8
Republican	Timothy A. Gaylord, Jr.	5,143	13.0	▼0.4
U.S. Labor	Janet C. Mandel	479	1.2	▲1.0
Libertarian	Richard S. Roth	445	1.1	▲0.8
U.S. Labor	Lynne Speed	320	0.8	▲0.6
Total votes		39,696	100.0	

New Jersey general election, 1977
Party	Candidate	Votes	%	±%
Democratic	Richard J. Codey	25,605	36.3	▲0.4
Democratic	Mildred Barry Garvin	23,430	33.2	▲0.1
Republican	Daniel Di Benedetto	11,322	16.1	▲1.7
Republican	Jeffrey A. Gerson	9,484	13.4	▼0.2
Libertarian	Katherine E. Florentine	242	0.3	▼1.4
Libertarian	Richard S. Roth	204	0.3	N/A
U.S. Labor	Lynne Speed	127	0.2	▼1.2
U.S. Labor	Dennis Speed	117	0.2	N/A
Total votes		70,531	100.0	

New Jersey general election, 1975
Party	Candidate	Votes	%	±%
Democratic	Richard J. Codey	22,618	35.9	▲0.2
Democratic	Eldridge Hawkins	20,830	33.1	0.0
Republican	Conrad N. Koch	9,069	14.4	▼2.1
Republican	Raymond Findley, Jr.	8,563	13.6	▼1.1
Libertarian	Kenneth R. Kaplan	1,069	1.7	N/A
U.S. Labor	Kenneth Mandel	852	1.4	N/A
Total votes		63,001	100.0	

New Jersey general election, 1973
Party	Candidate	Votes	%
Democratic	Richard Codey	30,282	35.7
Democratic	Eldridge Hawkins	28,102	33.1
Republican	John F. Trezza	13,978	16.5
Republican	Monroe Jay Lustbader	12,502	14.7
Total votes		84,864	100.0
