= Carol J. Murphy =

American politician

Carol J. Murphy (December 25, 1932 – December 14, 2011) was an American Republican Party politician who served four full terms in the New Jersey General Assembly from 1993 to 2002, where she represented the 26th Legislative District.

A graduate of William Paterson College, with a major in communications, Murphy was employed as a full-time legislator and lived in Morris Plains, New Jersey. She was elected to the Montville, New Jersey Township Committee and served as its Deputy Mayor from 1980 to 1984. In 1989, Murphy served on the New Jersey Commission on Employment and Training and as Chair of the New Jersey Board of Public Utilities Citizens Advisory Committee. She was elected to the Morris County Board of Chosen Freeholders, serving in office from 1984 to 1993. Murphy was a member of the New Jersey Supreme Court Committee on Environmental Litigation from 1989 to 1991, served on the New Jersey Commission on County and Municipal Government in 1991 and 1992, and served on the United States Environmental Protection Agency's Local Government and Small Town Advisory Committee starting in 1993.

With Robert Martin taking Leanna Brown's vacant seat in the Senate in August 1993, Murphy was selected to fill Martin's open seat in the Assembly. Murphy was elected to the General Assembly in 1993, and re-elected together with Alex DeCroce in 1995, 1997 and 1999. She served as Assistant Majority Leader from 1996 to 1998 and as Majority Conference Leader starting in 1998. She was a member of the Policy and Regulatory Oversight Committee.

In order to accommodate hunters who had more deer meat than they could eat and to help feed the hungry in New Jersey, Murphy proposed legislation to allow food banks and other charitable organizations to accept venison that was cleaned and cut by butchers approved by the New Jersey Department of Health. The bill passed in the Assembly in June 1996.

Murphy was nominated to the New Jersey Board of Public Utilities by Acting Governor of New Jersey Donald DiFrancesco. In February 2001, a special convention of district Republicans chose Joseph Pennacchio to fill the General Assembly seat vacated by Murphy.

New Jersey General Assembly
Preceded by Robert Martin	Member of the New Jersey General Assembly from the 26th district September 13, 1993–February 13, 2001; Served alongside: Alex DeCroce	Succeeded by Joseph Pennacchio
