= Florham Park School District =

School district in Morris County, New Jersey, US

Address
- 67-71 Ridgedale Avenue Florham Park, Morris County, New Jersey, 07932; United States
- Coordinates: 40.777286°N 74.400282°W

District information
- Grades: PreK-8
- Superintendent: Steven Caponegro
- Business administrator: John Csatlos
- Schools: 3

Students and staff
- Enrollment: 948 (as of 2023–24)
- Faculty: 97.1 FTEs
- Student–teacher ratio: 9.8:1

Other information
- District Factor Group: I
- Website: www.fpks.org
Ind.	Per pupil	District spending	Rank (*)	K-8 average	%± vs. average
1A	Total Spending	$18,462	59	$18,891	−2.3%
1	Budgetary Cost	14,786	59	14,159	4.4%
2	Classroom Instruction	8,393	37	8,659	−3.1%
6	Support Services	2,556	69	2,167	18.0%
8	Administrative Cost	1,757	68	1,547	13.6%
10	Operations & Maintenance	1,756	61	1,612	8.9%
13	Extracurricular Activities	175	78	104	68.3%
16	Median Teacher Salary	57,521	21	61,136
Data from NJDoE 2014 Taxpayers' Guide to Education Spending. *Of K-8 districts with more than 750 students. Lowest spending=1; Highest=84

The Florham Park School District is a comprehensive community public school district that serves students in kindergarten through eighth grade from Florham Park, in Morris County, in the U.S. state of New Jersey.

As of the 2023–24 school year, the district, consisting of three schools, had an enrollment of 948 students and 97.1 classroom teachers (on an FTE basis), for a student–teacher ratio of 9.8:1.

The district had been classified by the New Jersey Department of Education as being in District Factor Group "I", the second-highest of eight groupings. District Factor Groups organize districts statewide to allow comparison by common socioeconomic characteristics of the local districts. From lowest socioeconomic status to highest, the categories are A, B, CD, DE, FG, GH, I and J.

Students in public school for ninth through twelfth grades attend Hanover Park High School together with students from East Hanover Township, where the school is located, as part of the Hanover Park Regional High School District, which also serves students from the neighboring community of Hanover Township at Whippany Park High School in the Whippany section of Hanover Township. As of the 2023–24 school year, the high school had an enrollment of 713 students and 72.3 classroom teachers (on an FTE basis), for a student–teacher ratio of 9.9:1.

== Schools ==
The schools in the district (with 2023–24 school enrollment data from the National Center for Education Statistics) are:

Elementary schools

- Briarwood Elementary School with 332 students in grades PreK–2
  - Jeremy Serfozo, principal
- Brooklake Elementary School with 308 students in grades 3–5
  - Robert Foster, principal

Middle school

- Ridgedale Middle School with 298 students in grades 6–8
  - Nicholas Steffner, principal

== Administration ==
Core members of the district's administration are:

- Steven Caponegro, superintendent
- John Csatlos, business administrator and board secretary

== Board of education ==
The district's board of education, composed of seven members, sets policy and oversees the fiscal and educational operation of the district through its administration. As a Type II school district, the board's trustees are elected directly by voters to serve three-year terms of office on a staggered basis, with either two or three seats up for election each year held (since 2012) as part of the November general election. The board appoints a superintendent to oversee the district's day-to-day operations and a business administrator to supervise the business functions of the district.
