= Alex DeCroce =

American politician

Minority Leader of the New Jersey General Assembly
- In office January 12, 2004 – January 9, 2012
- Preceded by: Paul DiGaetano
- Succeeded by: Jon Bramnick

Member of the New Jersey General Assembly from the 26th district
- In office January 28, 1989 – January 9, 2012 Serving with Robert Martin, Carol J. Murphy, Joseph Pennacchio and Jay Webber
- Preceded by: Ralph A. Loveys
- Succeeded by: BettyLou DeCroce

Personal details
- Born: June 10, 1936 Morristown, New Jersey, U.S.
- Died: January 9, 2012 (aged 75) Trenton, New Jersey, U.S.
- Party: Republican

Alex DeCroce (June 10, 1936 – January 9, 2012) was an American Republican Party politician who served in the New Jersey General Assembly, where he represented the 26th Legislative District from 1989 until his death.

He was the Assembly's Republican Leader since 2003, served as the Republican Conference Leader from 2002 to 2003, and was the Deputy Speaker from 1994 to 2001. DeCroce served in the Assembly on the Legislative Services Commission.

DeCroce served on the Morris County Board of Chosen Freeholders from 1984 to 1989 and as the Freeholder Director in 1986.

DeCroce was born in Morristown and attended Boonton High School and Seton Hall University. He resided in Parsippany-Troy Hills.

== Death ==
DeCroce died on January 9, 2012, after collapsing in a bathroom inside the Statehouse, just moments after the 214th Legislature held its final voting session. He was 75. On January 25, 2012, his widow, BettyLou DeCroce, was selected by the Morris County Republican Committee to replace him in the Assembly until a November 2012 special election was held. She won the special election to fill the remainder of his unexpired term, and has since been reelected four times in her own right.
