= Marisa Sweeney =

American politician

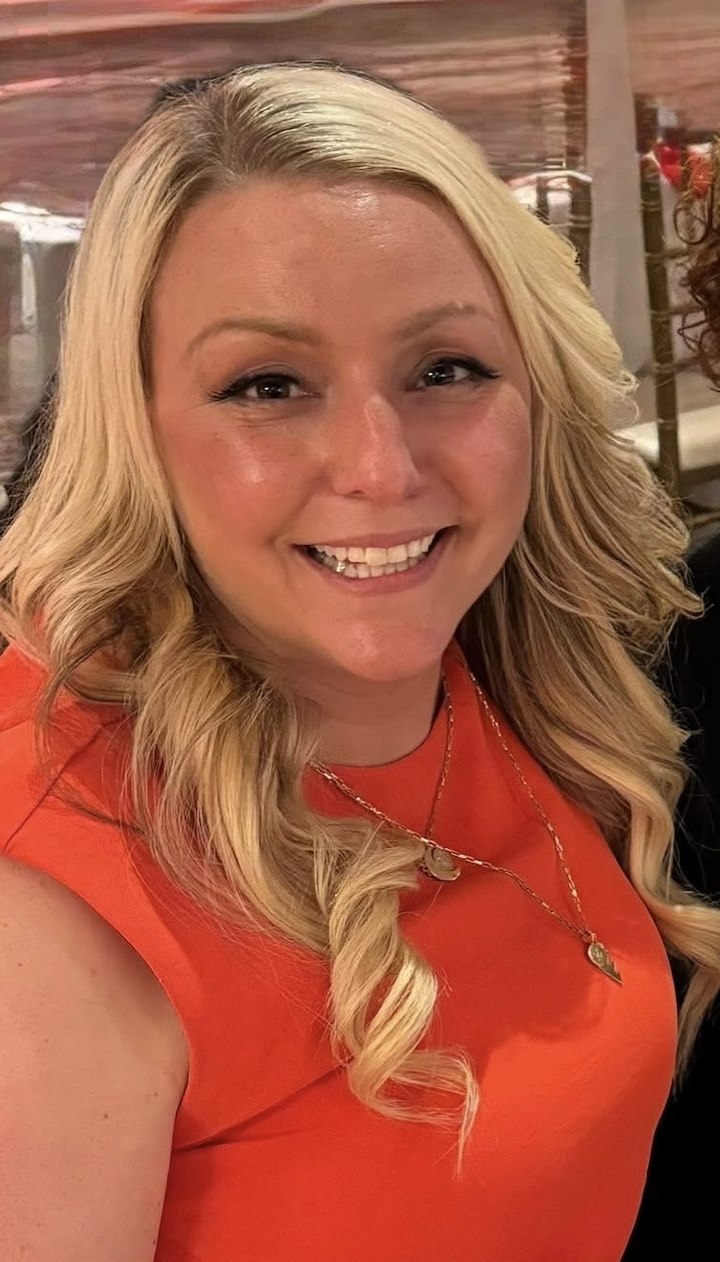

Member of the New Jersey General Assembly from the 25th district
- Incumbent
- Assumed office January 13, 2026 Serving with Aura K. Dunn
- Preceded by: Christian Barranco

Personal details
- Party: Democratic
- Education: Montclair State University; Northeastern University; University of North Florida
- Website: Legislative webpage

Marisa Sweeney is an American Democratic Party politician who has represented the 25th legislative district in the New Jersey General Assembly since taking office in January 2026.

== Career ==
Raised in Brick Township, New Jersey, Sweeney graduated from Montclair State University with a bachelor's degree in nutrition and food science, earned a master's at Northeastern University and received a doctorate in clinical nutrition at the University of North Florida.

She is a dietitian and yoga teacher, and had served as president of the Academy of Nutrition and Dietetics, and had testified before the legislature in Trenton regarding issues related to health. She was a member of the Morristown Planning Board.

== New Jersey General Assembly ==
Sweeney first announced her campaign for the General Assembly in early 2025, with the support of gubernatorial candidate Steven Fulop. She won the June Democratic nomination unopposed, alongside Steve Pylypchuk. Sweeney was elected in the general election making her the first Democrat to hold the seat since the district was established in 1974. She unseated incumbent Republican Christian Barranco, who conceded the race on November 6. Sweeney received a total of 49,918 votes, making her the highest vote-getter in the race.

=== Committee assignments ===
Committee assignments for the 2026–2027 Legislative Session are:

- Agriculture and Natural Resources
- Health
- Labor

== 25th District ==
Each of the 40 districts in the New Jersey Legislature has one representative in the New Jersey Senate and two members in the New Jersey General Assembly. The representatives from the 25th District for the 2026–2027 Legislative Session are:

- Senator Anthony M. Bucco (R)
- Assemblywoman Aura K. Dunn(R)
- Assemblywoman Marisa Sweeney (D)

== Electoral history ==
=== New Jersey Assembly ===
25th legislative district general election, 2025
Party	Candidate	Votes	%
Democratic	Marisa Sweeney	49,918	25.6%
Republican	Aura K. Dunn (incumbent)	49,088	25.2%
Republican	Christian Barranco (incumbent)	48,125	24.7%
Democratic	Steve Pylypchuk	47,723	24.5%
Total votes		194,854	100.0%
Democratic gain from Republican			
Republican hold			
