= James P. Vreeland =

American politician

Member of the New Jersey Senate
- In office January 8, 1974 – January 10, 1984
- Preceded by: District created
- Succeeded by: Leanna Brown
- Constituency: 24th District (1974–1982); 26th District (1974–1982)

Member of the New Jersey General Assembly from District 10B
- In office January 11, 1972 – January 8, 1974 Serving with Ann Klein
- Preceded by: Peter W. Thomas; Everett B. Vreeland
- Succeeded by: District eliminated

Montville, New Jersey Committeeman
- In office 1956–1970

Morris County, New Jersey Freeholder
- In office 1970–1972

Mayor of Montville, New Jersey

New Jersey Civil Service Commissioner
- In office 1984–1990
- Appointed by: Brendan Byrne

Personal details
- Born: February 4, 1910 Towaco, New Jersey
- Died: July 2, 2001 (aged 91) Lincoln Park, New Jersey
- Education: Boonton High School (1927); Rutgers University; Lehigh University

James P. Vreeland (February 4, 1910 – July 2, 2001), also known as James Vreeland Jr., was an American Republican Party politician who served four terms in the New Jersey Senate after a term in the New Jersey General Assembly. He served in the Senate from 1974 to 1984, representing the 24th Legislative District until 1982, and then served one term representing the 26th Legislative District. Vreeland also served a term on the Morris County, New Jersey Board of Chosen Freeholders from 1970 until his resignation in 1972.

== Biography ==
He was born on February 4, 1910, in the Towaco section of Montville, New Jersey, and graduated from Boonton High School in 1927. He attended both Rutgers University and Lehigh University.

Vreeland's first political position was when he was elected to the Montville Township Committee in 1956. He served as Mayor of Montville in the early 1960s, during a period when the area was facing extensive population growth and land speculation with the forthcoming development of Interstate 80 and Interstate 287 that would bring more development to the area. Though Vreeland stated that he had no plans to sell his 60-acre (240,000 m^{2}) vegetable farm, he was a moderate on the issue of imposing zoning changes desired by many residents to require new homes to be built on properties of at least 1-acre (4,000 m^{2}), instead of the half-acre zoning that was then in place.

Vreeland won in his first bid for the New Jersey Senate, defeating Democrat John C. Keefe by a margin of 52.6% to 47.4%. Vreeland expanded his mandate in the 1977 general election, defeating Democratic nominee Norma K. Herzfeld by 66.8%–33.2%.

In redistricting following the 1980 United States census, Vreeland was relocated to the 26th Legislative District and in the 1981 election defeated Democrat Benjamin Steltzer by his widest margin, taking 70.1% of the vote to 29.9% for the challenger.

As part of an effort to cut the $2.76 billion budget (equivalent to $15.6 billion in 2025) proposed by Brendan Byrne, the Governor of New Jersey in 1976, Vreeland was one of seven members of the Joint Appropriations Committee who proposed a $2,500 reduction in the governor's salary. Vreeland argued that the cut "wouldn't hurt [the Governor] too much", though the effort was defeated.

In 1977, rankings published by the Americans for Democratic Action, Vreeland and fellow Republican Frank Davenport received the lowest rankings in the state, receiving a rating of 8% based on a series of 20 votes considered by the legislature; Teaneck Democrat Matthew Feldman was the only legislator to receive a 100% rating.

In what the Philadelphia Daily News described as a "stunning upset", Assemblymember Leanna Brown defeated Vreeland in the June 1983 Republican primary. Brown went on to win the November general election, becoming the first woman from the Republican Party to serve in the upper house of the State Legislature.

Together with their son, James P. Vreeland III, the Vreelands operated a farm in Towaco, New Jersey, near U.S. Route 202, where visitors could pick their own strawberries, tomatoes, beans, cucumbers, peppers, and eggplants depending on the season.

He died at the age of 91 on July 2, 2001, at the Lincoln Park Subacute and Rehabilitation Center in Lincoln Park, New Jersey.
