= Leanna Brown =

American politician

Member of the New Jersey Senate from the 26th district
- In office January 10, 1984 – July 7, 1993
- Preceded by: James P. Vreeland
- Succeeded by: Robert Martin

Member of the New Jersey General Assembly
- In office November 5, 1980 – January 10, 1984 Serving with Dean Gallo
- Preceded by: Barbara A. Curran
- Succeeded by: Ralph A. Loveys
- Constituency: 24th District (1980–1982); 26th District (1982–1984)

Personal details
- Born: Leanna Cawley Young; May 11, 1935 Providence, Rhode Island, U.S.
- Died: December 15, 2016 (aged 81) Lebanon, New Jersey, U.S.
- Party: Republican
- Spouse: William Stanley Brown (m. 1956; died 2013)
- Children: 2
- Education: Smith College (BA)

Leanna Brown (May 11, 1935 – December 15, 2016) was an American politician who served in both houses of the New Jersey Legislature, where she represented New Jersey's 26th legislative district, including parts of Morris and Passaic Counties. She was the first Republican woman elected to the New Jersey Senate.

== Early life ==
Brown was born Leanna Cawley Young in Providence, Rhode Island. Her father was a partner at the New York brokerage firm of Blyth, Eastman Dillon & Co. She attended the Northfield School for Girls (now part of Northfield Mount Hermon School) in Gill, Massachusetts and was graduated in 1952. She was graduated from Smith College in 1956. She married a Yale graduate, Stanley Brown, and they settled in Chatham, New Jersey

== Career ==
Initially, Brown spent four years writing test questions for Educational Testing Service that is located outside Princeton, New Jersey. She later became active in local politics in Chatham, serving on the borough council from 1969 to 1972. In 1972, she was elected to serve on the Morris County Board of Chosen Freeholders. She was named freeholder director in 1976 and president of the New Jersey Association of Counties in 1978.

In 1980, Brown won a special election to an unexpired term in the New Jersey General Assembly. She was re-elected the following year. In 1983, she challenged her former running-mate, James P. Vreeland, for the Republican nomination for state senate in the 26th district. She won the primary in what the Philadelphia Daily News described as a "stunning upset" and she was elected to the state senate, becoming the first woman from the Republican Party to serve in the upper house of the state legislature.

In 1989, she formed an exploratory committee to consider a run for governor of New Jersey. Brown ultimately decided against running in the Republican primary, which was won by Jim Courter.

In 1993, Brown resigned from the state senate when she was appointed to the New Jersey Casino Control Commission, initially, to serve out the unexpired term of Charles J. Irwin. Assemblymember Robert Martin was chosen to fill Brown's vacancy in the senate. The following year she was named by Governor Christine Todd Whitman to a full five-year term on the commission, serving until 1999.

Brown and her husband founded Brown Global Enterprises, a small consulting firm. In 2001, she volunteered to work on the transition team for President George W. Bush. In May 2007, she was appointed by Bush to serve on the President's Commission on White House Fellowships.

== Personal life ==
After graduation from Smith, Brown married William Stanley Brown, who had attended the Mount Hermon School and Yale University. They settled in Chatham, New Jersey and became longtime residents. He was a scientist, working at Bell Telephone Laboratories in Murray Hill. Stan died on January 16, 2013. They had two sons, four grandchildren, and one great-granddaughter.

Later, she lived in Morristown, New Jersey and on December 15, 2016, she died at her son's home in Lebanon, New Jersey after a short illness.
