= Robert Martin (New Jersey politician) =

American New Jersey state politician

Member of the New Jersey Senate from the 26th district
- In office August 16, 1993 – January 8, 2008
- Preceded by: Leanna Brown
- Succeeded by: Joseph Pennacchio

Member of the New Jersey General Assembly from the 26th district
- In office February 4, 1985 – August 16, 1993 Serving with Ralph A. Loveys and Alex DeCroce
- Preceded by: Dean Gallo
- Succeeded by: Carol Murphy

Personal details
- Born: January 13, 1947 (age 79) Newark, New Jersey, U.S.
- Party: Republican

Robert J. Martin (born January 13, 1947) is an American Republican Party politician, who served as a member of the New Jersey State Senate from 1993 to 2008, where he represented the 26th legislative district.

Before entering the Senate, Martin served in the United States Army as a First Lieutenant (1969–1971). Martin served in the New Jersey General Assembly, the lower house of the New Jersey Legislature, from 1985 to 1993, where he served as Minority Whip (1990–1992) and Assistant Majority Leader (1986–1988). He was also a member of the Morris Plains Council from 1983 to 1985, and the Morris Plains Planning Board from 1980 to 1982.

Martin replaced Dean Gallo in a special Assembly election following Gallo's election to Congress.

Senator Martin was the Assistant Majority Leader from 1994 to 1997, and served on the Education Committee, the Judiciary Committee and the Joint Committee on the Public Schools. Martin is also a Law Professor and former associate dean at Seton Hall University School of Law and has served as director of the Center for State and Local Government Law at Seton Hall University.

In September 2005, Martin said he would not seek re-election to his seat in 2007, saying that he was finished after over 20 years of public service.

Martin received a B.A. from Dickinson College in History, an M.A. from Lehigh University in History, a J.D. from the Seton Hall University School of Law, an L.L.M. from New York University School of Law and an Ed.D. from Teachers College at Columbia University. Martin is a resident of Morris Plains, New Jersey.

Martin currently serves as Counsel on the Zoning Board of Adjustment in Pompton Lakes, New Jersey.

Preceded by Dean Gallo	New Jersey General Assembly; 26th Legislative District; 1985–1993	Succeeded by Carol Murphy
Preceded by Leanna Brown	New Jersey Senate; 26th Legislative District; 1993-2008	Succeeded by Joseph Pennacchio
