= Joseph Pennacchio =

American politician (born 1955)

Minority Whip of the New Jersey Senate
- Incumbent
- Assumed office August 21, 2017
- Leader: Thomas Kean Jr.
- Preceded by: Kevin J. O'Toole (2014)

Member of the New Jersey Senate from the 26th district
- Incumbent
- Assumed office January 8, 2008
- Preceded by: Robert J. Martin

Member of the New Jersey General Assembly from the 26th district
- In office February 25, 2001 – January 8, 2008 Serving with Alex DeCroce
- Preceded by: Carol J. Murphy
- Succeeded by: Jay Webber

Member of the Morris County Board of Chosen Freeholders
- In office January 1, 1999 – February 25, 2001
- Preceded by: John M. Fox
- Succeeded by: John Inglesino

Personal details
- Born: May 27, 1955 (age 71) Brooklyn, New York, U.S.
- Party: Republican
- Spouse: Diane Pennacchio
- Children: Two
- Education: Brooklyn College (BS); New York University (DDS)
- Occupation: Dentist
- Website: Legislative website

Joseph Pennacchio (born May 27, 1955) is an American Republican Party politician, who has represented the 26th Legislative District in the New Jersey Senate since January 8, 2008. Pennacchio has served in the Senate as the Deputy Republican Leader since 2022. He served in the General Assembly from 2001 to 2008.

== Early life ==
Pennacchio was born in Brooklyn, New York. He received a B.S. in 1976 from Brooklyn College in Biology and a D.D.S. degree in 1979 from the New York University College of Dentistry.

He served on the Morris County Board of Chosen Freeholders from 1998 to 2001 and is a former member of Governor DiFrancesco's New Jersey Economic Development Authority. He is the founder and a former member of the Montville Education Foundation, and a former member of the Montville Economic Development Council. He ousted incumbent freeholder, John M. Fox, in the 1998 Republican primary. He was succeeded by John Inglesino on the Board of Chosen Freeholders.

Pennacchio currently resides in Rockaway Township with his wife Diane.

== New Jersey Assembly ==
Pennacchio was elected to the New Jersey General Assembly in February 2001 by a special convention of district Republicans to fill the seat vacated by Carol Murphy, following her nomination by Acting Governor of New Jersey Donald DiFrancesco to the New Jersey Board of Public Utilities.

== New Jersey Senate ==
Pennacchio ran for state Senate in 2007 upon the retirement of Robert J. Martin. He has since served as Assistant Minority Leader from 2014 to 2017 when he was chosen as Minority Whip. During the 2019 budget fight, Democrats contradicted Governor Phil Murphy and passed a budget without the millionaires' tax. Pennacchio, alongside six other Republicans, voted for the budget. Since 2022, he has been the Deputy Republican Leader .

=== Committees ===
Committee assignments for the 2024—2025 Legislative Session are:

- Economic Growth
- Legislative Oversight

=== District 26 ===
Each of the 40 districts in the New Jersey Legislature has one representative in the New Jersey Senate and two members in the New Jersey General Assembly. The representatives from the 26th District for the 2024—2025 Legislative Session are:

- Senator Joseph Pennacchio (R)
- Assemblyman Brian Bergen (R)
- Assemblyman Jay Webber (R)

== United States House campaign ==
In 1994, Pennacchio challenged Congressman Dean Gallo in the Republican primary. He lost the primary.

== United States Senate campaign ==
On January 17, 2008, Pennacchio launched his campaign for the 2008 United States Senate race. On June 3, 2008, he was defeated in the Republican primary by former Congressman Dick Zimmer.

== Controversies ==
In 1991, Pennacchio sent a 94-page white paper called the "Nationalist Agenda" to then-New Jersey General Assembly minority leader Chuck Haytaian. The manifesto, among other things, called for a new "Nationalist Party;" Balanced Budget Amendment; Line-item Veto Amendment; Term Length/Limit Amendment (six-year terms for presidents, senators, and congressmen and twelve-year term limits for each office); Anti-Racism Amendment; Amend the 2nd Amendment to allow for regulation and banning of certain guns and ammunition; Death Penalty Amendment (make murder a federal crime and ensure that the death penalty is allowed); Equal Rights Amendment (albeit slightly amended); Flag-Burning Amendment; abolition of the Electoral College; establishment of regional presidential primaries; Establishment of a federal "Department of Science"; national lottery (funded by voluntary $52-per-year contributions on tax returns; only those participating would be eligible to win), school vouchers; reforms to Social Security, Medicare, Medicaid, and Welfare Reform; letting the homeless stay in military bases; and mandatory military service for non-violent criminals. This has been referred to by his primary opponent as a "fascist manifesto". Sabrin called for him to drop out of the Senate race and resign from the State Senate. Pennacchio refused to drop out, and said that these were ideas he came up with before he ran for office, and that he had "evolved" beyond many of them. Pennacchio described these attacks as "anti-Italian". Despite these attacks, he bested Sabrin by a wide margin.

== Involvement in Trump campaign ==
On October 16, 2019, the Donald Trump 2020 presidential campaign announced that Pennacchio and State Senator Mike Testa would be honorary state chairs of Trump's Victory Team.

== Electoral history ==
=== New Jersey Senate ===
26th Legislative District General Election, 2023
Party	Candidate	Votes	%
Republican	Joseph Pennacchio (incumbent)	28,313	56.8
Democratic	Joan Waks	21,571	43.2
Total votes		49,884	100.0
Republican hold			

26th Legislative District general election, 2021
Party	Candidate	Votes	%
Republican	Joe Pennacchio (incumbent)	46,057	58.94
Democratic	Christine Clarke	32,087	41.06
Total votes		78,144	100.0
Republican hold			

New Jersey general election, 2017
Party	Candidate	Votes	%	±%
Republican	Joe Pennacchio	32,269	56.5	▼8.5
Democratic	Elliot Isibor	24,867	43.5	▲8.5
Total votes		'57,136'	'100.0'	

New Jersey general election, 2013
Party	Candidate	Votes	%	±%
Republican	Joe Pennacchio	35,772	65.0	▲0.7
Democratic	Avery Ann Hart	19,250	35.0	▲2.2
Total votes		'55,022'	'100.0'	

New Jersey general election, 2011
Party	Candidate	Votes	%
Republican	Joe Pennacchio	20,230	64.3
Democratic	Wasim Khan	10,317	32.8
Scafa For Senate	Joseph Scafa	913	2.9
Total votes		31,460	100.0

New Jersey general election, 2007
Party	Candidate	Votes	%	±%
Republican	Joe Pennacchio	26,567	66.4	▲0.4
Democratic	Wasim A. Khan	13,442	33.6	▼0.4
Total votes		'40,009'	'100.0'	

=== New Jersey Assembly ===
New Jersey general election, 2005
Party	Candidate	Votes	%	±%
Republican	Alex DeCroce	35,646	30.2	▼2.5
Republican	Joe Pennacchio	34,331	29.1	▼3.1
Democratic	Kathleen Lynch-McCabe	23,795	20.1	▲2.2
Democratic	Avery Hart	22,881	19.4	▲2.2
Libertarian	Anthony Pio Costa	833	0.7	N/A
Libertarian	Kenneth Kaplan	660	0.6	N/A
Total votes		'118,146'	'100.0'	

New Jersey general election, 2003
Party	Candidate	Votes	%	±%
Republican	Alex DeCroce	20,882	32.7	▼1.5
Republican	Joe Pennacchio	20,609	32.2	▼0.2
Democratic	Laurie Fierro	11,467	17.9	▲1.0
Democratic	Patrick J. Caserta	10,972	17.2	▲0.8
Total votes		'63,930'	'100.0'	

New Jersey general election, 2001
Party	Candidate	Votes	%
Republican	Alex DeCroce	39,381	34.2
Republican	Joe Pennacchio	37,251	32.4
Democratic	Joseph Raich	19,491	16.9
Democratic	Sergio Bio	18,870	16.4
Total votes		114,993	100.0

New Jersey Senate
Preceded by Robert Martin	Member of the New Jersey Senate for the 26th District; January 8, 2008 – Present	Succeeded by Incumbent
New Jersey General Assembly
Preceded by Carol J. Murphy	Member of the New Jersey General Assembly for the 26th District; February 25, 2001 – January 8, 2008; With: Alex DeCroce	Succeeded by Jay Webber
