= Brian Bergen =

New Jersey politician (born 1979)

Member of the New Jersey General Assembly
- Incumbent
- Assumed office January 14, 2020 Serving with Jay Webber
- Preceded by: Michael Patrick Carroll
- Constituency: 25th district (2020–2024); 26th district (2024–present)

Personal details
- Born: July 8, 1979 (age 47)
- Party: Republican
- Education: United States Military Academy (B.S.); University of Phoenix (M.S.); Rutgers Business School (M.B.A)
- Website: Legislative webpage

Military service
- Allegiance: United States
- Branch/service: United States Army
- Years of service: 1997-2008
- Rank: Captain

Brian Bergen (born July 8, 1979) is an American Republican Party politician who has represented the 26th legislative district in the New Jersey General Assembly since 2024. He had represented the 25th district when he took office on January 14, 2020.

== Early life and education ==
Bergen is from Denville Township, New Jersey, where he served on the township council.

Bergen was a member of the cross country running team at James Caldwell High School in West Caldwell, which led to interest in joining the team at the United States Military Academy. After attending West Point, Bergen served from 1997 to 2008 in the United States Army as a Boeing AH-64 Apache attack helicopter pilot and earned graduate degrees from the University of Phoenix and Rutgers University.

== New Jersey General Assembly ==
Bergen entered the race for Assembly after incumbent Republican Michael Patrick Carroll announced that he would run for Surrogate of Morris County. In the June 2019 Republican primary, Bergen and Anthony M. Bucco won the nomination for the two Assembly seats in the 25th district. After the death of State Senator Anthony R. Bucco in September 2019, his son was appointed to fill the senate seat, and Aura K. Dunn was appointed to fill the vacant Assembly seat.

In the November 2021 general election, Bergen and his Republican running mate, Aura K. Dunn, defeated Democratic Party challengers Lauren Barnett and Patricia Veres.

In the 2021 reapportionment, many municipalities in Morris County were shuffled between districts. As a result, Bergen relocated from the 25th legislative district to the 26th district, while Christian Barranco shifted from the 26th District into the 25th.

=== Committees ===
Committee assignments for the 2024—2025 Legislative Session are:

- Commerce, Economic Development and Agriculture
- Labor

=== District 26 ===
Each of the 40 districts in the New Jersey Legislature has one representative in the New Jersey Senate and two members in the New Jersey General Assembly. The representatives from the 26th District for the 2024—2025 Legislative Session are:

- Senator Joseph Pennacchio (R)
- Assemblyman Brian Bergen (R)
- Assemblyman Jay Webber (R)

== Electoral history ==
26th Legislative District General Election, 2023
Party	Candidate	Votes	%
Republican	Jay Webber (incumbent)	28,146	28.7
Republican	Brian Bergen (incumbent)	27,831	28.3
Democratic	John Van Achen	21,263	21.7
Democratic	Walter Mielarczyk	20,962	21.4
Total votes		98,202	100.0
Republican hold			
Republican hold			

25th legislative district general election, 2021
Party	Candidate	Votes	%
Republican	Aura K. Dunn (incumbent)	42,183	28.25%
Republican	Brian Bergen (incumbent)	41,584	27.85%
Democratic	Lauren Barnett	33,322	22.31%
Democratic	Patricia L. Veres	32,243	21.59%
Total votes		149,332	100.0
Republican hold			

25th Legislative District General Election, 2019
Party	Candidate	Votes	%
Republican	Anthony Bucco, Jr. (incumbent)	26,848	27.19%
Republican	Brian Bergen	25,552	25.87%
Democratic	Lisa Bhimani	23,505	23.8%
Democratic	Darcy Draeger	22,850	23.14%
Total votes		98,755	100%
Republican hold			
