= Littell =

Littell, Littel or Litel is a surname, a variant spelling of Little. Notable people with the surname include:

- Alfred B. Littell (1893–1970), American politician
- Alison Littell McHose (born 1965), American politician, Robert and Virginia Littell's daughter
- Dave Littell (born 1953), American Olympic fencer
- Eliakim Littell (1797–1870), American founder of the periodical Littell's Living Age
- Emlen T. Littell (1840–1891), American architect
- Franklin Littell (1917–2009), American Protestant scholar
- Isaac Littell (1857–1924), United States Army brigadier general
- John Litel (1892–1972), American film and television actor
- Jonathan Littell (born 1967), Robert Littell's son and also a writer
- Mark Littell (1953–2022), American Major League Baseball pitcher
- Robert E. Littell (1936–2014), American politician, Alfred B. Littell's son
- Robert Littell (author) (born 1935), American writer
- Ross F. Littell (1924–2000), American textile and furniture designer
- Samuel Harrington Littell (1873–1967), Episcopal bishop of Hawaii
- Stuart Litel (born 1961), American software consultant
- Virginia Littell (born 1943), American politician, Robert Littell's wife
- Zack Littell (born 1995), American Major League Baseball pitcher
