= 1994 United States House of Representatives elections in New Jersey =

- November 8, 1994

All 13 New Jersey seats to the United States House of Representatives
- Turnout: 55% (▼27pp)
	Majority party	Minority party
Party	Republican	Democratic
Last election	6	7
Seats won	8	5
Seat change	▲2	▼2
Popular vote	1,091,251	879,855
Percentage	54.4%	43.9%
Swing	▲4.18pp	▼1.41pp

Republican
40–50%
50–60%
60–70%
70–80%
80–90%
Democratic
50–60%
60–70%
70–80%

The 1994 United States House of Representatives elections in New Jersey were held on November 8, 1994, to determine who would represent the people of New Jersey in the United States House of Representatives. This election coincided with national elections for U.S. House and U.S. Senate. New Jersey had thirteen seats in the House, apportioned according to the 1990 United States census. Representatives are elected for two-year terms.

By flipping the second and eighth districts, Republicans gained a majority in the House delegation for the first time since 1964. These elections were part of a national shift toward the Republican Party in the 1994 elections which has become known as the "Republican Revolution", in which the party won the House for the first time since 1952.

== Overview ==
1994 United States House of Representatives elections in New Jersey
Party	Votes	Percentage	Candidates	Seats	+/–
Republican	1,091,251	54.42%	13	8	▲2
Democratic	879,855	43.88%	13	5	▼2
Conservative	6,956	0.35%	4	0	Steady
Natural Law	3,263	0.16%	5	0	Steady
Libertarian	2,882	0.14%	1	0	Steady
Socialist Workers	1,519	0.08%	2	0	Steady
Independents	19,390	0.97%	11	0	Steady
Totals	2,005,116	100.00%	49	13	—

== District 1 ==
1994 New Jersey's 1st congressional district election
- November 8, 1994
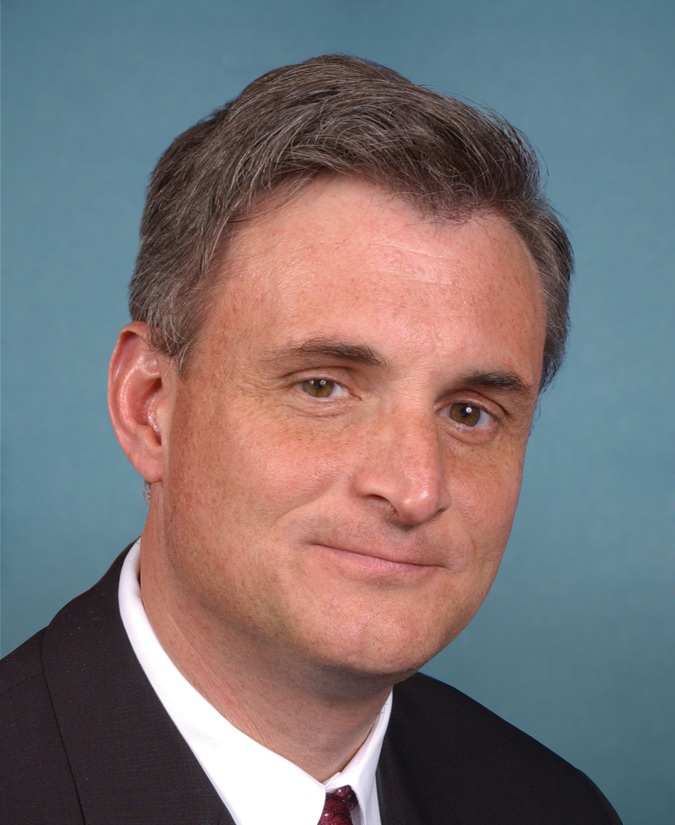

Nominee	Rob Andrews	James N. Hogan
Party	Democratic	Republican
Popular vote	108,155	41,505
Percentage	72.3%	27.7%
U.S. Representative before election
Rob Andrews
Democratic
Elected U.S. Representative
Rob Andrews
Democratic

Incumbent Democrat Rob Andrews won. The district included parts of Burlington, Camden, and Gloucester counties.

=== Democratic primary ===
==== Candidates ====
- Rob Andrews, incumbent Representative from Haddon Heights since 1990

==== Results ====
1994 Democratic primary
Party	Candidate	Votes	%
Democratic	Rob Andrews (incumbent)	19,554	100.00%
Total votes		19,554	100.00%

=== Republican primary ===
==== Candidates ====
- William Henry Harris
- James N. Hogan, Gloucester County Sheriff

==== Results ====
1994 Republican primary
Party	Candidate	Votes	%
Republican	James N. Hogan	7,061	80.05%
Republican	William Henry Harris	1,760	19.95%
Total votes		8,821	100.00%

=== General election ===
==== Candidates ====
- Rob Andrews, incumbent Representative from Haddon Heights since 1990 (Democratic)
- James N. Hogan, Gloucester County Sheriff (Republican)

==== Results ====
1994 U.S. House election
Party	Candidate	Votes	%	±%
Democratic	Rob Andrews (incumbent)	108,155	72.27%	▲4.84
Republican	James N. Hogan	41,505	27.73%	▼0.82
Total votes		149,660	100.00%	
Democratic hold		Swing	{{{swing}}}	

== District 2 ==
1994 New Jersey's 2nd congressional district election
- November 8, 1994
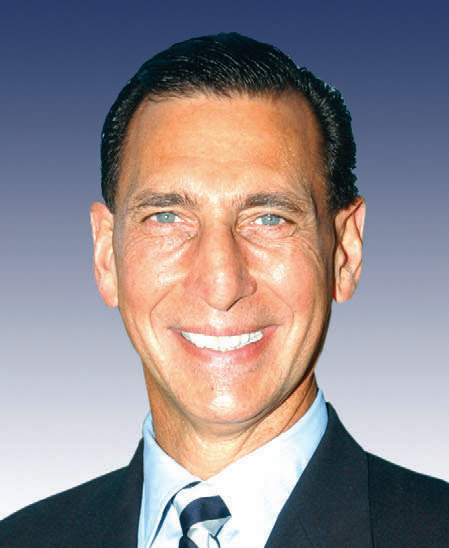

Nominee	Frank LoBiondo	Louis Magazzu
Party	Republican	Democratic
Popular vote	102,566	54,441
Percentage	64.6%	35.4%
U.S. Representative before election
William J. Hughes
Democratic
Elected U.S. Representative
Frank LoBiondo
Republican

Incumbent William J. Hughes did not run for re-election to an eleventh term in office. In the open race, Republican Frank LoBiondo easily defeated Louis Magazzu. This district, the largest in South Jersey, included all of Atlantic, Cape May, Cumberland, and Salem counties and parts of Burlington and Gloucester counties.

=== Democratic primary ===
==== Candidates ====
- Ruth Katz
- George N. Lyne
- Louis N. Magazzu, Vineland city solicitor

===== Declined =====
- William J. Hughes, incumbent Representative since 1975

==== Results ====
1994 Democratic primary
Party	Candidate	Votes	%
Democratic	Louis N. Magazzu	6,206	50.40%
Democratic	Ruth Katz	4,797	38.96%
Democratic	George N. Lyne	1,310	10.64%
Total votes		12,313	100.00%

=== Republican primary ===
==== Candidates ====
- Robert D. Green
- Bill Gormley, state senator from Margate City and candidate for governor in 1989
- Frank LoBiondo, assemblyman from Vineland and nominee for this district in 1992

==== Campaign ====
Because Hughes was retiring and the district was overwhelmingly conservative and Republican, the Republican primary would likely determine the ultimate victor and was the most closely watched in the state. Frank LoBiondo, an assemblyman, former freeholder, and nominee for this district in 1992, faced off against Bill Gormley, a state senator who had run for governor in 1989 and narrowly survived a primary and general election challenge in 1991.

Gormley, though better known, was more moderate than LoBiondo, who campaigned on his strong opposition to taxes and support for reduction in the scope of the federal government, a platform similar to the one on which Governor Christine Todd Whitman had been elected one year prior. Gormley aides later said that they were concerned that emphasizing conservative positions in the primary would make it difficult for their candidate to return to the middle of the political spectrum for the fall general election.

Former governor Thomas Kean endorsed Gormley and campaigned for him in the final weeks.

==== Endorsements ====
Bill Gormley

State executive branch officials

- Thomas Kean, 48th Governor of New Jersey

==== Results ====
1994 Republican primary
Party	Candidate	Votes	%
Republican	Frank LoBiondo	23,152	54.47%
Republican	William Gormley	14,989	35.26%
Republican	Robert D. Green	4,364	10.27%
Total votes		42,505	100.00%

Kean commented on the result, saying, "I worry about the party ideologically, and I intend to get involved on that side, not on picking candidates. The party has got to get more comfortable with people, including blacks. I think this is the best time to begin addressing some things that are not being addressed."

=== General election ===
==== Candidates ====
- Frank LoBiondo, assemblyman from Vineland and nominee for this district in 1992 (Republican)
- Louis N. Magazzu, Vineland city solicitor (Democratic)

==== Campaign ====
Without Hughes, a popular and relatively conservative Democrat who had held the district since 1974, out of the race, the district was expected to support a Republican candidate. Republicans outnumbered Democrats in the district by about 85,000 to 75,000, with 150,000 unaffiliated voters. However, party chair Tom Byrne cited Bill Clinton's narrow victory in the district in 1992 as evidence that Magazzu could hold the seat.

LoBiondo campaigned on lower taxes, spending cuts, and a reduction of the federal government. Magazzu stressed crime reduction as the main theme of his campaign, including through stricter gun control legislation. LoBiondo raised more than Magazzu by a 3-to-1 margin and polls showed him with at least a 30-point lead.

Labor unions in the district supported LoBiondo, urging the public to "Vote for the Two Franks," referring to LoBiondo and Democratic U.S. senator Frank Lautenberg, who faced a tough re-election contest.

==== Results ====
1994 U.S. House election
Party	Candidate	Votes	%	±%
Republican	Frank LoBiondo	102,566	64.62%	▲23.14
Democratic	Louis N. Magazzu	56,151	35.38%	▼20.50
Total votes		158,717	100.00%	
Republican hold		Swing	{{{swing}}}	

== District 3 ==
1994 New Jersey's 3rd congressional district election
- November 8, 1994
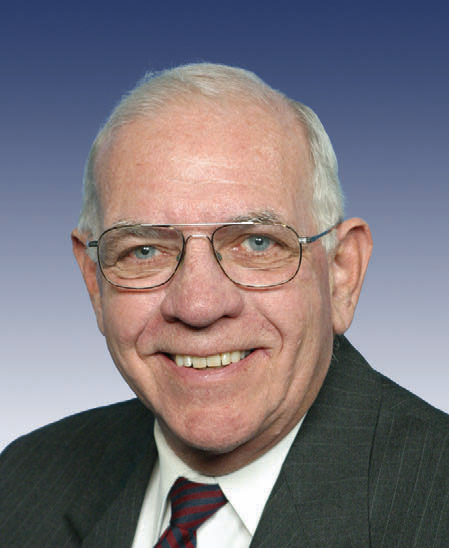

Nominee	Jim Saxton	Jim Smith
Party	Republican	Democratic
Popular vote	115,750	54,441
Percentage	66.4%	31.2%
U.S. Representative before election
Jim Saxton
Republican
Elected U.S. Representative
Jim Saxton
Republican

Incumbent Republican Jim Saxton won. This district included parts of Burlington, Camden, and Ocean counties.

=== Republican primary ===
==== Candidates ====
- Jim Saxton, incumbent Representative from Mount Holly since 1984

==== Results ====
1994 Republican primary
Party	Candidate	Votes	%
Republican	Jim Saxton (incumbent)	18,483	100.00%
Total votes		18,483	100.00%

=== Democratic primary ===
==== Candidates ====
- Anthony J. Verderese, independent candidate for this district in 1992
- Jay Williams

==== Results ====
1994 Democratic primary
Party	Candidate	Votes	%
Democratic	Jay Williams	8,462	87.22%
Democratic	Anthony J. Verderese	1,240	12.73%
Total votes		9,702	100.00%

After the primary, Williams was replaced by James B. Smith.

=== General election ===
==== Candidates ====
- Anthony Fulvio Croce (Independent)
- D. James Hill (Independent)
- Jim Saxton, incumbent Representative from Mount Holly since 1984 (Republican)
- James B. Smith, former mayor of Mount Holly and nominee for this district in 1984 and 1988 (Democratic)

==== Results ====
1994 U.S. House election
Party	Candidate	Votes	%	
Republican	Jim Saxton (incumbent)	115,750	66.40%	▲7.23
Democratic	James B. Smith	54,441	31.23%	▼5.52
Independent	D. James Hill	3,015	1.73%	N/A
Independent	Arthur Fulvio Croce	1,122	0.64%	N/A
Total votes		174,328	100.00%	
Republican hold		Swing	{{{swing}}}	

== District 4 ==
1994 New Jersey's 4th congressional district election
- November 8, 1994
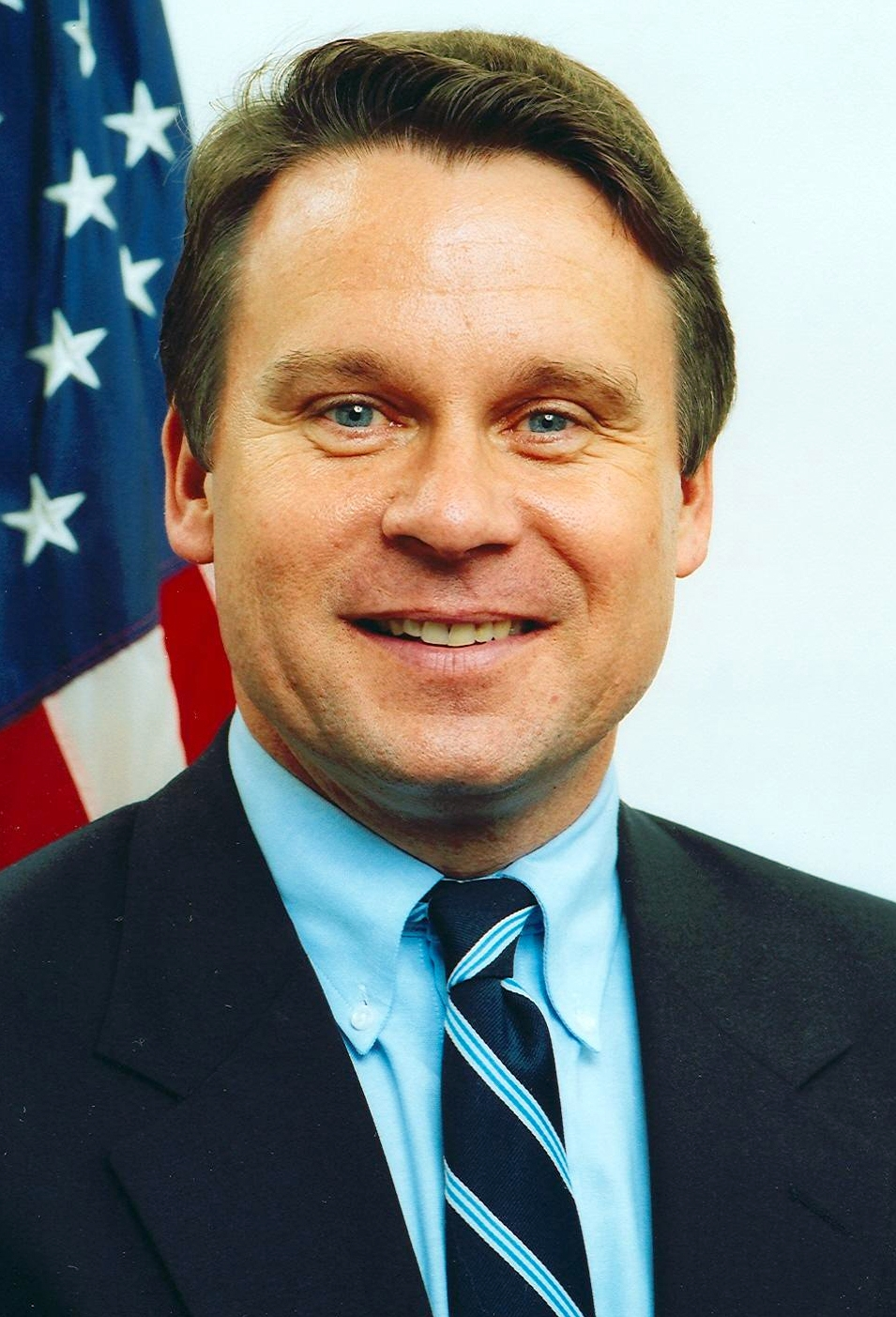

Nominee	Chris Smith	Ralph Walsh
Party	Republican	Democratic
Popular vote	109,818	49,537
Percentage	67.9%	30.6%
U.S. Representative before election
Chris Smith
Republican
Elected U.S. Representative
Chris Smith
Republican

Incumbent Republican Chris Smith won. This district, in Central Jersey, consisted of parts of Burlington, Mercer, Monmouth and Ocean counties.

=== Republican primary ===
==== Candidates ====
- Chris Smith, incumbent Representative since 1981

==== Results ====
1994 Republican primary
Party	Candidate	Votes	%
Republican	Chris Smith (incumbent)	15,358	100.00%
Total votes		15,358	100.00%

=== Democratic primary ===
==== Candidates ====
- Michael DiMarco
- Ralph Walsh

==== Results ====
1994 Democratic primary
Party	Candidate	Votes	%
Democratic	Ralph Walsh	8,097	87.55%
Democratic	Michael DiMarco	1,151	12.45%
Total votes		9,248	100.00%

=== General election ===
==== Candidates ====
- Arnold Kokans (Natural Law)
- Leonard P. Marshall (NJ Conservative)
- Chris Smith, incumbent Representative since 1981 (Republican)
- Ralph Walsh (Democratic)

==== Results ====
1994 U.S. House election
Party	Candidate	Votes	%	±%
Republican	Chris Smith (incumbent)	109,818	67.89%	▲6.08
Democratic	Ralph Walsh	49,537	30.62%	▼4.42
Conservative	Leonard P. Marshall	1,579	0.98%	▲0.30
Natural Law	Arnold Kokans	833	0.51%	N/A
Total votes		161,767	100.00%	
Republican hold		Swing	{{{swing}}}	

== District 5 ==
1994 New Jersey's 5th congressional district election
- November 8, 1994
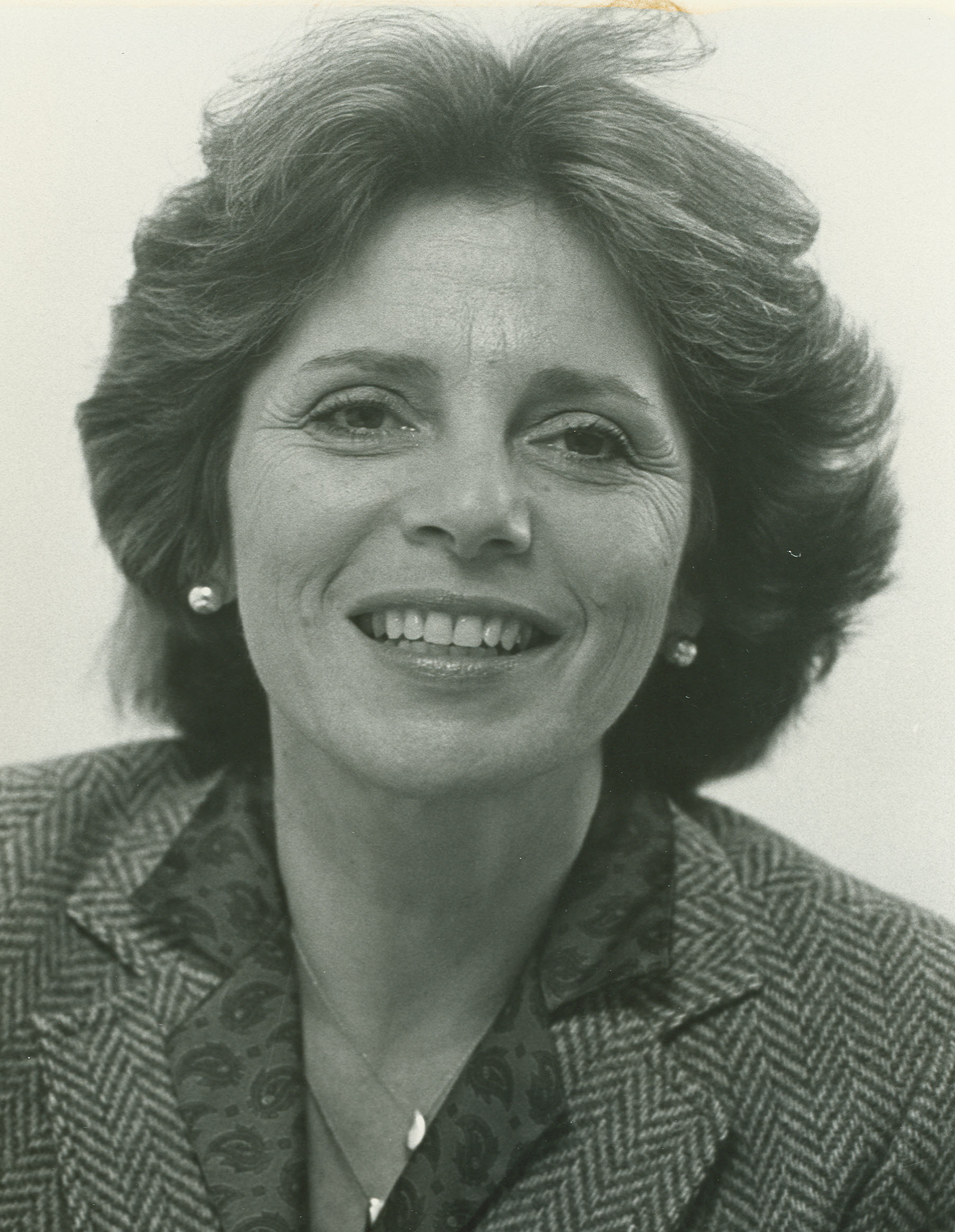

Nominee	Marge Roukema	Bill Auer
Party	Republican	Democratic
Popular vote	139,964	41,275
Percentage	74.2%	21.9%
U.S. Representative before election
Marge Roukema
Republican
Elected U.S. Representative
Marge Roukema
Republican

Incumbent Marge Roukema won. This district included parts of Bergen, Passaic, and Sussex counties and all of Warren County.

=== Republican primary ===
==== Candidates ====
- Lorraine La Neve
- Marge Roukema, incumbent Representative from Ridgewood since 1981

==== Results ====
1994 Republican primary
Party	Candidate	Votes	%
Republican	Marge Roukema (incumbent)	20,394	76.87%
Republican	Lorraine La Neve	6,138	23.13%
Total votes		26,532	100.00%

=== Democratic primary ===
==== Candidates ====
- Bill Auer, Allendale advertising businessman
- Richard Forbes, supporter of Lyndon LaRouche and perennial candidate

==== Results ====
1994 Democratic primary
Party	Candidate	Votes	%
Democratic	Bill Auer	6,459	86.51%
Democratic	Richard Forbes	1,007	13.49%
Total votes		7,466	100.00%

=== General election ===
==== Candidates ====
- Bill Auer, Allendale advertising businessman (Democratic)
- Roger Bacon (Libertarian)
- Helen Hamilton (Natural Law)
- William J. Leonard (Independent)
- Marge Roukema, incumbent Representative from Ridgewood since 1981 (Republican)

==== Results ====
1994 U.S. House election
Party	Candidate	Votes	%	±%
Republican	Marge Roukema (incumbent)	139,964	74.25%	▲2.74
Democratic	Bill Auer	41,275	21.90%	▼2.73
Independent	William J. Leonard	3,746	1.99%	▼0.26
Libertarian	Roger Bacon	2,882	1.53%	▲0.57
Natural Law	Helen Hamilton	638	0.34%	N/A
Total votes		188,505	100.00%	
Republican hold		Swing	{{{swing}}}	

== District 6 ==
1994 New Jersey's 6th congressional district election
- November 8, 1994
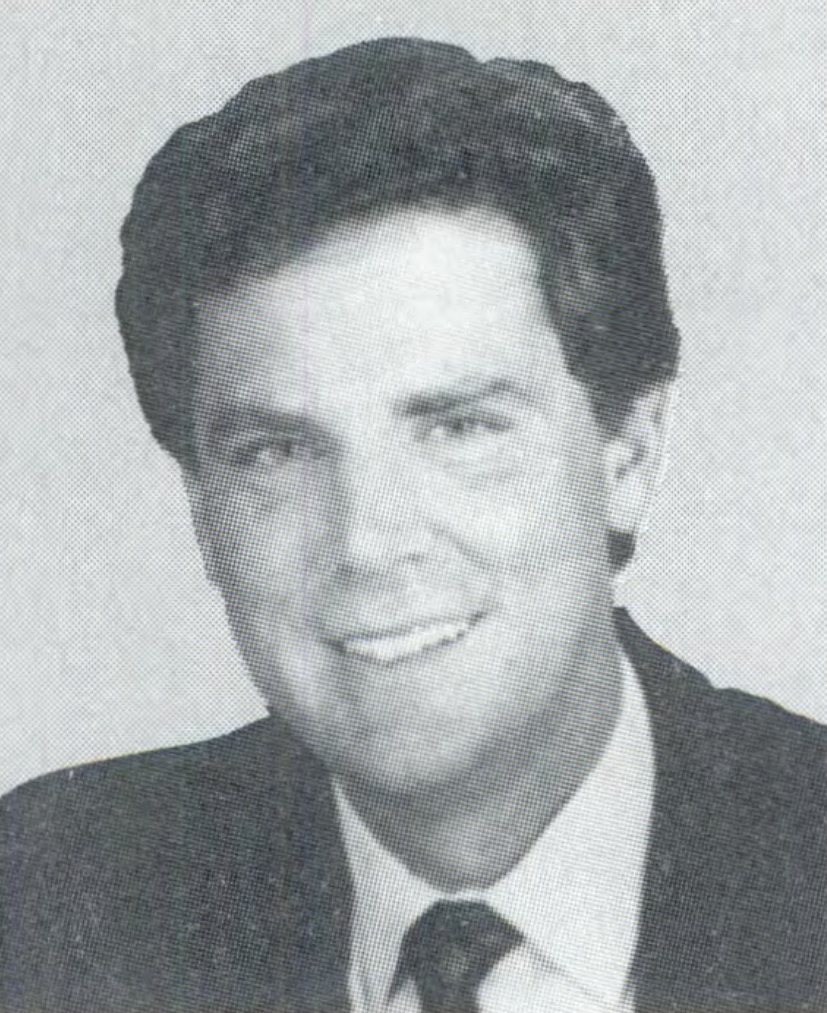

Nominee	Frank Pallone	Mike Herson
Party	Democratic	Republican
Popular vote	88,922	55,287
Percentage	60.4%	37.5%
U.S. Representative before election
Frank Pallone
Democratic
Elected U.S. Representative
Frank Pallone
Democratic

Incumbent Democrat Frank Pallone won. This district included parts of Middlesex and Monmouth counties.

=== Democratic primary ===
==== Candidates ====
- Frank Pallone, incumbent Representative from Long Branch since 1988

==== Results ====
1994 Democratic primary
Party	Candidate	Votes	%
Democratic	Frank Pallone (incumbent)	12,700	100.00%
Total votes		12,700	100.00%

=== Republican primary ===
==== Candidates ====
- Roger W. Daley, Middlesex County Freeholder
- Mike Herson, attorney and former aide to presidents Ronald Reagan and George H. W. Bush

==== Results ====
1994 Republican primary
Party	Candidate	Votes	%
Republican	Mike Herson	5,608	57.74%
Republican	Roger W. Daley	4,105	42.26%
Total votes		9,713	100.00%

=== General election ===
==== Candidates ====
- Charles H. Dickson (Capitalist)
- Mike Herson, attorney and former aide to presidents Ronald Reagan and George H. W. Bush (Republican)
- Frank Pallone, incumbent Representative from Long Branch since 1988 (Democratic)
- Richard Quinn (Natural Law)
- Gary J. Rich (NJ Conservative)

==== Results ====
1994 U.S. House election
Party	Candidate	Votes	%	±%
Democratic	Frank Pallone Jr. (incumbent)	88,922	60.36%	▲8.05
Republican	Mike Herson	55,287	37.53%	▼7.12
Independent	Charles H. Dickson	1,774	1.20%	▲1.08
Conservative	Gary J. Rich	800	0.54%	N/A
Natural Law	Richard Quinn	548	0.37%	N/A
Total votes		147,331	100.00%	
Democratic hold		Swing	{{{swing}}}	

== District 7 ==
1994 New Jersey's 7th congressional district election
- November 8, 1994
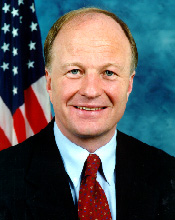

Nominee	Bob Franks	Karen Carroll
Party	Republican	Democratic
Popular vote	98,814	64,231
Percentage	59.6%	38.7%
U.S. Representative before election
Bob Franks
Republican
Elected U.S. Representative
Bob Franks
Republican

Incumbent Bob Franks won. This district included parts of Essex, Middlesex, Somerset, and Union counties.

=== Republican primary ===
==== Candidates ====
- Bob Franks, incumbent Representative from Summit since 1993

==== Results ====
1994 Republican primary
Party	Candidate	Votes	%
Republican	Bob Franks (incumbent)	11,756	100.00%
Total votes		11,756	100.00%

=== Democratic primary ===
==== Candidates ====
- Karen Carroll, Bridgewater activist and candidate for this district in 1992

==== Results ====
1994 Democratic primary
Party	Candidate	Votes	%
Democratic	Karen Carroll	7,653	100.00%
Total votes		7,653	100.00%

=== General election ===
==== Candidates ====
- Karen Carroll, Bridgewater activist and candidate for this district in 1992 (Democratic)
- James J. Cleary (Larouche Was Right)
- Bob Franks, incumbent Representative from Summit since 1993 (Republican)
- Claire Greene (Natural Law)

==== Results ====
1994 U.S. House election
Party	Candidate	Votes	%	±%
Republican	Bob Franks (incumbent)	98,814	59.58%	▲6.30
Democratic	Karen Carroll	64,231	38.73%	▼3.90
Independent	James J. Cleary	2,331	1.41%	N/A
Natural Law	Claire Greene	481	0.29%	N/A
Total votes		165,857	100.00%	
Republican hold		Swing	{{{swing}}}	

== District 8 ==
1994 New Jersey's 8th congressional district election
- November 8, 1994
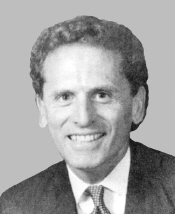

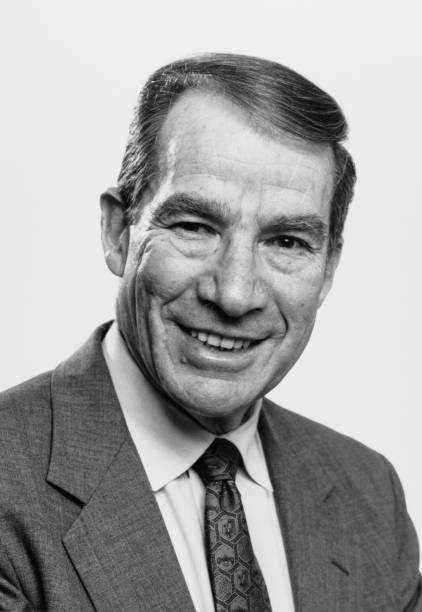
Nominee	Bill Martini	Herb Klein
Party	Republican	Democratic
Popular vote	70,494	68,661
Percentage	49.9%	48.7%
U.S. Representative before election
Herb Klein
Democratic
Elected U.S. Representative
Bill Martini
Republican

Incumbent Herb Klein ran for a second term in office but was defeated by Bill Martini. This district included parts of Essex and Passaic counties.

=== Democratic primary ===
==== Candidates ====
- Herb Klein, incumbent Representative since 1993

==== Results ====
1994 Democratic primary
Party	Candidate	Votes	%
Democratic	Herb Klein (incumbent)	13,011	100.00%
Total votes		13,011	100.00%

=== Republican primary ===
==== Candidates ====
- Bill Martini, Passaic County Freeholder and member of the Clifton City Council

==== Results ====
1994 Republican primary
Party	Candidate	Votes	%
Republican	Bill Martini	8,071	100.00%
Total votes		8,071	100.00%

=== General election ===
==== Candidates ====
- Bernard George (Conservative)
- Herb Klein, incumbent Representative since 1993 (Democratic)
- Bill Martini, Passaic County Freeholder and member of the Clifton City Council (Republican)

==== Campaign ====
Klein had won a bitter and expensive race in 1992, and leaders of both parties agreed that the eighth district was the most competitive race in 1994. Both campaigns spent heavily on advertising and were supported by visits from party leaders from outside the state. Republicans sought to unseat the first-term incumbent Klein before he could become entrenched.

Both candidates emphasized crime prevention, as well as taxes, government spending, and the economy. Klein cited the Violent Crime Control and Law Enforcement Act as the first legislation to increase public safety, while Martini criticized it as "pork-laden", with programs that had little to do with crime prevention. Klein said he had voted against President Bill Clinton's proposed budget because he felt it did not have enough spending cuts; Martini charged that Klein had voted later for all of the spending proposals in the budget and that Klein had repeatedly passed on opportunities to vote for further reductions in the federal budget deficit.

The Paterson-based district, which was once a major economic hub and the birthplace of American manufacturing, had not recovered from the recession earlier in the decade as well as the rest of the state had.

==== Endorsements ====
Herb Klein (D)

Federal executive branch officials

- Al Gore, Vice President of the United States
Bill Martini (R)

Federal executive branch officials

- Michael Chertoff, former U.S. Attorney for the District of New Jersey

Local officials

- Rudy Giuliani, mayor of New York City

==== Results ====
1994 U.S. House election
Party	Candidate	Votes	%	±%
Republican	Bill Martini	70,494	49.87%	▲8.73
Democratic	Herb Klein (incumbent)	68,661	48.57%	▲1.57
Conservative	Bernard George	2,213	1.57%	N/A
Total votes		141,368	100.00%	
Democratic hold		Swing	{{{swing}}}	

Martini declared victory in Totowa at 10:50 p.m. on election night, stating, "I think it's time that we have a chance to bring forth to the American people the policies that they want, the policies of opportunity." Klein conceded shortly thereafter, saying, "Politics is like the ocean; it ebbs and it flows. Unfortunately, we were in a down period, but I know that I have served with pride."

== District 9 ==
1994 New Jersey's 9th congressional district election
- November 8, 1994
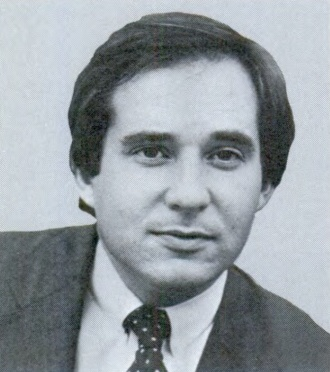

Nominee	Bob Torricelli	Peter J. Russo
Party	Democratic	Republican
Popular vote	99,984	57,651
Percentage	62.5%	36.1%
U.S. Representative before election
Bob Torricelli
Democratic
Elected U.S. Representative
Bob Torricelli
Democratic

Incumbent Democrat Bob Torricelli won.

=== Democratic primary ===
==== Candidates ====
- Matt Guice
- Bob Torricelli, incumbent Representative from Englewood since 1983

==== Results ====
1994 Democratic primary
Party	Candidate	Votes	%
Democratic	Robert G. Torricelli (incumbent)	15,564	91.12%
Democratic	Matt Guice	1,516	8.88%
Total votes		17,080	100.00%

=== Republican primary ===
==== Candidates ====
- Peter J. Russo, former assemblyman from Lyndhurst and candidate for this district in 1990 and 1992

==== Results ====
1994 Republican primary
Party	Candidate	Votes	%
Republican	Peter J. Russo	7,267	100.00%
Total votes		7,267	100.00%

=== General election ===
==== Candidates ====
- Kenneth Ebel (Natural Law)
- Gregory Pason (Independent)
- Peter J. Russo, former assemblyman from Lyndhurst and candidate for this district in 1990 and 1992 (Republican)
- Bob Torricelli, incumbent Representative from Englewood since 1983 (Democratic)

==== Results ====
1994 U.S. House election
Party	Candidate	Votes	%	±%
Democratic	Bob Torricelli (incumbent)	99,984	62.53%	▲4.22
Republican	Peter J. Russo	57,651	36.06%	▼0.88
Independent	Gregory Pason	1,490	0.93%	N/A
Natural Law	Kenneth Ebel	763	0.48%	N/A
Total votes		159,888	100.00%	
Democratic hold		Swing	{{{swing}}}	

== District 10 ==
1994 New Jersey's 10th congressional district election
- November 8, 1994
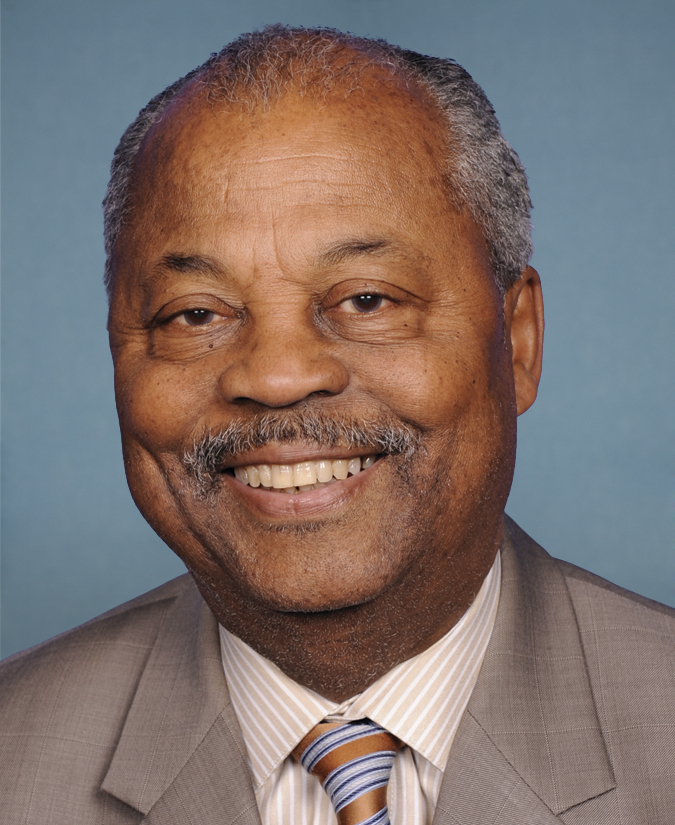

Nominee	Donald M. Payne	Jim Ford
Party	Democratic	Republican
Popular vote	74,622	21,524
Percentage	75.9%	21.9%
U.S. Representative before election
Donald M. Payne
Democratic
Elected U.S. Representative
Donald M. Payne
Democratic

Incumbent Democrat Donald M. Payne won. The district included parts of Essex, Hudson, and Union counties.

=== Democratic primary ===
==== Candidates ====
- Donald M. Payne, incumbent Representative from Newark since 1989

==== Results ====
1994 Democratic primary
Party	Candidate	Votes	%
Democratic	Donald M. Payne (incumbent)	26,439	100.00%
Total votes		26,439	100.00%

=== Republican primary ===
==== Candidates ====
- Jim Ford

==== Results ====
1994 Republican primary
Party	Candidate	Votes	%
Republican	Jim Ford	2,362	100.00%
Total votes		2,362	100.00%

=== General election ===
==== Candidates ====
- Jim Ford (Republican)
- Rose Monyek, perennial candidate (Inflation Fighting Housewife)
- Donald M. Payne, incumbent Representative from Newark since 1989 (Democratic)
- Maurice Williams (Socialist Workers)

==== Results ====
1994 U.S. House election
Party	Candidate	Votes	%	±%
Democratic	Donald M. Payne (incumbent)	74,622	75.86%	▼2.52
Republican	Jim Ford	21,524	21.88%	▲1.72
Independent	Rose Monyek	1,598	1.62%	N/A
Socialist Workers	Maurice Williams	624	0.63%	▲0.02
Total votes		98,368	100.00%	
Democratic hold		Swing	{{{swing}}}	

== District 11 ==
1994 New Jersey's 11th congressional district election
- November 8, 1994
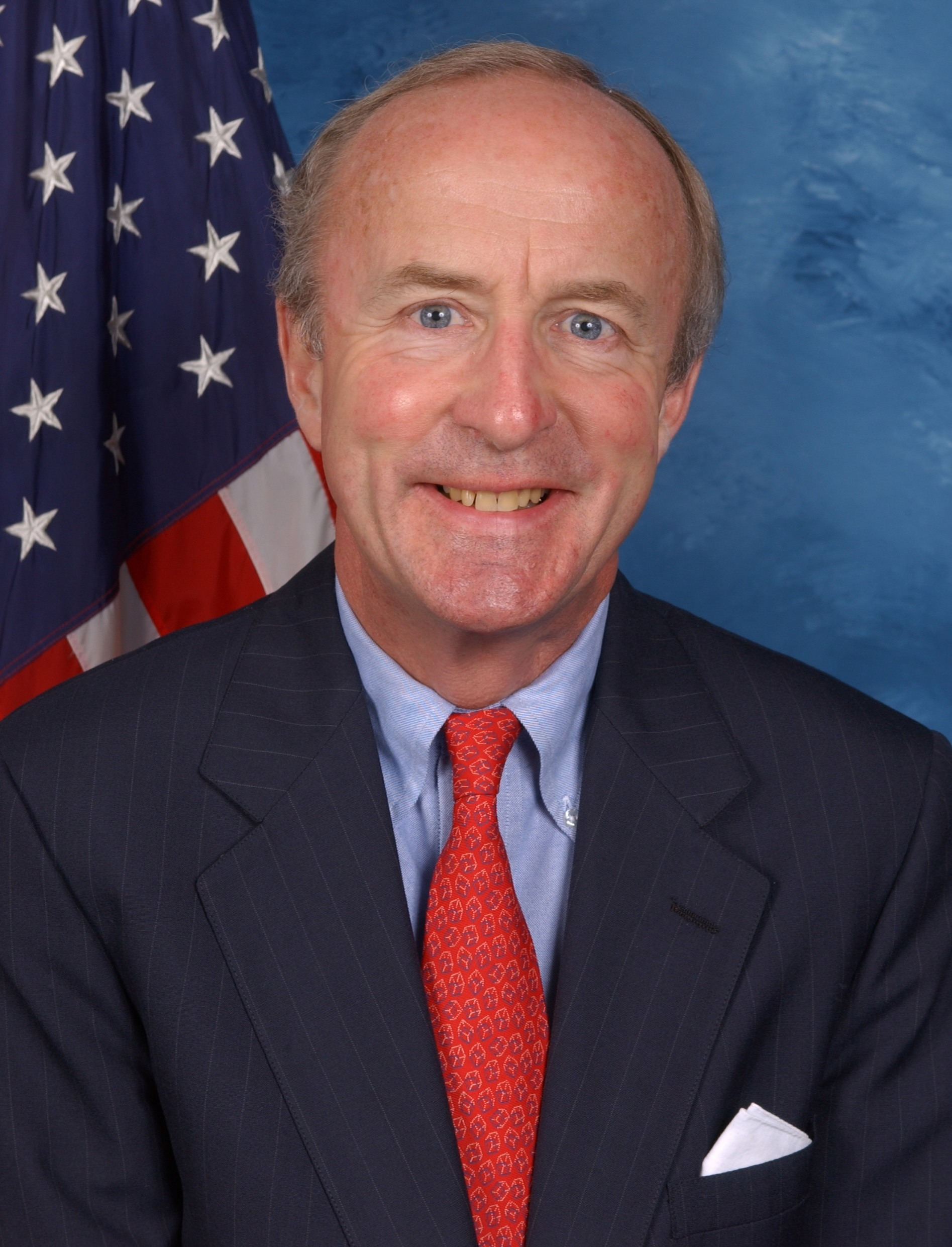

Nominee	Rodney Frelinghuysen	Frank Herbert
Party	Republican	Democratic
Popular vote	127,868	50,211
Percentage	71.2%	28.0%
U.S. Representative before election
Vacant
Elected U.S. Representative
Rodney Frelinghuysen
Republican

Incumbent Republican Dean Gallo initially ran for re-election, but he withdrew from the race in August due to terminal prostate cancer. In the open race to succeed him, Republican Party committee members selected Rodney Frelinghuysen, who easily defeated Frank Herbert. This district consisted of all of Morris County and parts of Essex, Passaic, Somerset, and Sussex counties.

In the Republican primary, Gallo defeated a strenuous challenge from three candidates, including future state senator Joe Pennacchio. In the Democratic primary, Herbert won over John Kucek, a self-declared Christian nationalist and supporter of David Duke. As of 2026, Herbert remains the only candidate in New Jersey history to win a primary for Congress as a write-in candidate.

=== Republican primary ===
==== Candidates ====
- Barry Fitzpatrick
- Dean Gallo, incumbent Representative since 1985
- Frank C. Marmo
- Joe Pennacchio, Montville dentist

==== Results ====
1994 Republican primary
Party	Candidate	Votes	%
Republican	Dean Gallo (incumbent)	26,492	65.28%
Republican	Joe Pennacchio	10,917	26.90%
Republican	Barry Fitzpatrick	2,107	5.19%
Republican	Frank C. Marmo	1,067	2.63%
Total votes		40,583	100.00%

=== Republican replacement convention ===
After Gallo withdrew from the race in August, Republican committee members from the district selected Rodney Frelinghuysen, whom Gallo had designated as his successor, as a replacement nominee. Frelinghuysen received 662 votes, well ahead of the runner-up Jeff Grow, who received 27.

==== Candidates ====
- Tim Costello
- Rodney Frelinghuysen, assemblyman from Morristown and son of former Representative Peter Frelinghuysen Jr.
- Jeff Grow, Rockaway attorney

===== Declined =====
- Robert J. Martin, state senator from Morris Plains
- Charles Poekel Jr., Essex Fells attorney and nominee for this seat in 1976

==== Endorsements ====
Rodney Frelinghuysen

U.S. representatives

- Dean Gallo, incumbent Representative for this district

State legislators

- Chuck Haytaian, speaker of the New Jersey General Assembly and nominee for U.S. Senate

Political parties

- Essex County Republican Party
- Morris County Republican Party

==== Campaign ====
Frelinghuysen, who had run unsuccessfully in another district in 1982 and 1990, announced his campaign with Gallo's support on the same day Gallo withdrew. He also had support from the Morris and Essex Republican parties and U.S. Senate nominee Chuck Haytaian, clearing the field quickly of any other serious candidates.

==== Results ====
The special convention to designate a replacement was held on September 12.

1994 Republican primary
Party	Candidate	Votes	%
Republican	Rodney Frelinghuysen	662	95.94%
Republican	Jeff Grow	27	3.91%
Republican	Tim Costello	1	0.14%
Total votes		690	100.00%

=== Democratic primary ===
==== Candidates ====
- Frank Herbert, former state senator from Waldwick (write-in)
- John Kucek

===== Disqualified =====
- Daniel G. Tauriello, Middlesex County College administrator

==== Campaign ====
Although the Democratic primary in this district was usually ignored, it gained wide public attention when Daniel G. Tauriello, the party's preferred choice, was disqualified from the ballot after about one dozen of his petition signatures were challenged by John Kucek, an outspoken Holocaust revisionist and supporter of David Duke, leaving Kucek as the only candidate on the ballot.

In response, party leaders and Jewish groups recruited former state senator Frank Herbert as a write-in candidate for the nomination. Kucek defend himself by stating, "I'm not anti-Semitic or anti-Jewish; I'm pro-American."

==== Results ====
1994 Democratic primary
Party	Candidate	Votes	%
Democratic	Frank Herbert (write-in)	5,971	70.55%
Democratic	John Kucek	8,464	29.45%
Total votes		9,098	100.00%

=== General election ===
==== Candidates ====
- Stuart Bacha, Populist Party candidate for General Assembly in 1993 (Fascist)
- Rodney Frelinghuysen, assemblyman from Morristown and son of former Representative Peter Frelinghuysen Jr. (Republican)
- Mary Frueholz (LaRouche Was Right)
- Frank Herbert, former state senator from Waldwick (Democratic)

===== Withdrew =====
- Dean Gallo, incumbent Representative since 1985 (Republican) (died November 6)

==== Results ====
1994 U.S. House election
Party	Candidate	Votes	%	±%
Republican	Rodney Frelinghuysen	127,868	71.20%	▲1.10
Democratic	Frank Herbert	50,211	27.96%	▲2.30
Independent	Mary Frueholz	1,065	0.59%	N/A
Independent	Stuart Bacha	436	0.24%	N/A
Total votes		179,580	100.00%	
Republican hold		Swing	{{{swing}}}	

== District 12 ==
1994 New Jersey's 12th congressional district election
- November 8, 1994
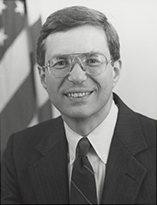

Nominee	Dick Zimmer	Joseph Youssouf
Party	Republican	Democratic
Popular vote	125,939	55,977
Percentage	68.3%	30.4%
U.S. Representative before election
Dick Zimmer
Republican
Elected U.S. Representative
Dick Zimmer
Republican

Incumbent Republican Dick Zimmer won. This district, based in Central Jersey, included all of Hunterdon County and parts of Mercer, Middlesex, Monmouth and Somerset counties.

=== Republican primary ===
==== Candidates ====
- Dick Zimmer, incumbent Representative since 1991

==== Results ====
1994 Republican primary
Party	Candidate	Votes	%
Republican	Dick Zimmer (incumbent)	16,529	100.00%
Total votes		16,529	100.00%

=== Democratic primary ===
==== Candidates ====
- Joseph D. Youssouf, nominee for state senate in 1991

==== Results ====
1994 Democratic primary
Party	Candidate	Votes	%
Democratic	Joseph D. Youssouf	8,180	100.00%
Total votes		8,180	100.00%

=== General election ===
==== Candidates ====
- Anthony M. Provenzano (NJ Conservative)
- Joseph D. Youssouf, nominee for state senate in 1991 (Democratic)
- Dick Zimmer, incumbent Representative since 1991 (Republican)

==== Results ====
1994 U.S. House election
Party	Candidate	Votes	%	±%
Republican	Dick Zimmer	125,939	68.34%	▲4.47
Democratic	Joseph D. Youssouf	55,977	30.38%	▼0.06
Conservative	Anthony M. Provenzano	2,364	1.28%	N/A
Total votes		184,280	100.00%	
Republican hold		Swing	{{{swing}}}	

== District 13 ==
1994 New Jersey's 13th congressional district election
- November 8, 1994
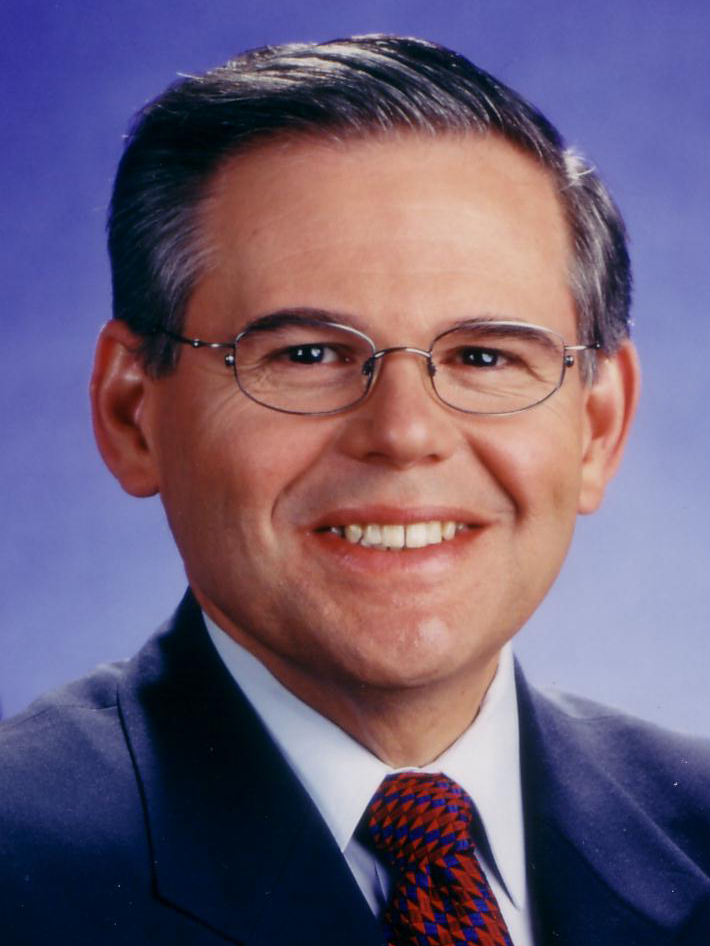

Nominee	Bob Menendez	Fernando Alonso
Party	Democratic	Republican
Popular vote	67,688	24,071
Percentage	70.9%	25.2%
U.S. Representative before election
Bob Menendez
Democratic
Elected U.S. Representative
Bob Menendez
Democratic

Incumbent Democrat Bob Menendez won. This district included parts of Essex, Hudson, Middlesex, and Union counties.

=== Democratic primary ===
==== Candidates ====
- Bob Menendez, incumbent Representative from Union City since 1993

==== Results ====
1994 Democratic primary
Party	Candidate	Votes	%
Democratic	Bob Menendez (incumbent)	21,651	100.00%
Total votes		21,651	100.00%

=== Republican primary ===
==== Candidates ====
- Fernando Alonso
- Mary Ann Hester
- Brian W. McAlindin

==== Results ====
1994 Republican primary
Party	Candidate	Votes	%
Republican	Fernando Alonso	2,955	49.28%
Republican	Brian W. McAlindin	2,323	38.74%
Republican	Mary Ann Hester	718	11.97%
Total votes		5,996	100.00%

=== General election ===
==== Candidates ====
- Fernando Alonso (Republican)
- Steven Marshall (Socialist Workers)
- Bob Menendez, incumbent Representative from Union City since 1993 (Democratic)
- Frank J. Rubino Jr. (We the People)
- Herbert H. Shaw, perennial candidate (Politicians Are Crooks)

==== Results ====
1994 U.S. House election
Party	Candidate	Votes	%	±%
Democratic	Bob Menendez (incumbent)	67,688	70.90%	▲6.62
Republican	Fernando Alonso	24,071	25.21%	▼5.35
Independent	Frank Rubino Jr.	1,494	1.56%	N/A
Independent	Herbert H. Shaw	1,319	1.38%	N/A
Socialist Workers	Steven Marshall	895	0.94%	▼0.02
Total votes		95,467	100.00%	
Democratic hold		Swing	{{{swing}}}	
