= White House Internship Program =

Internship program to work at the White House

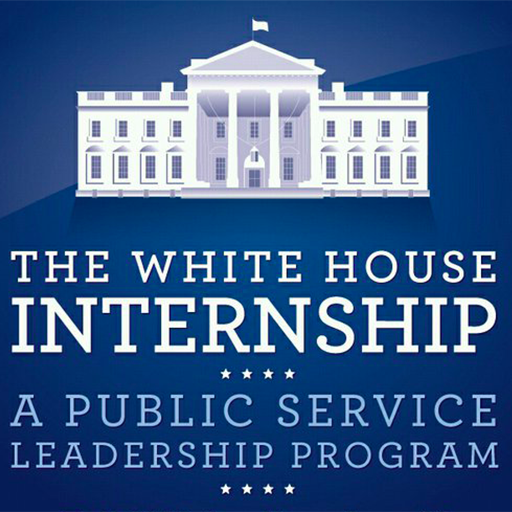
Official logo of the White House Internship Program

The White House Internship Program is a government internship program that enables students and graduates to work at the White House.

== Program overview ==
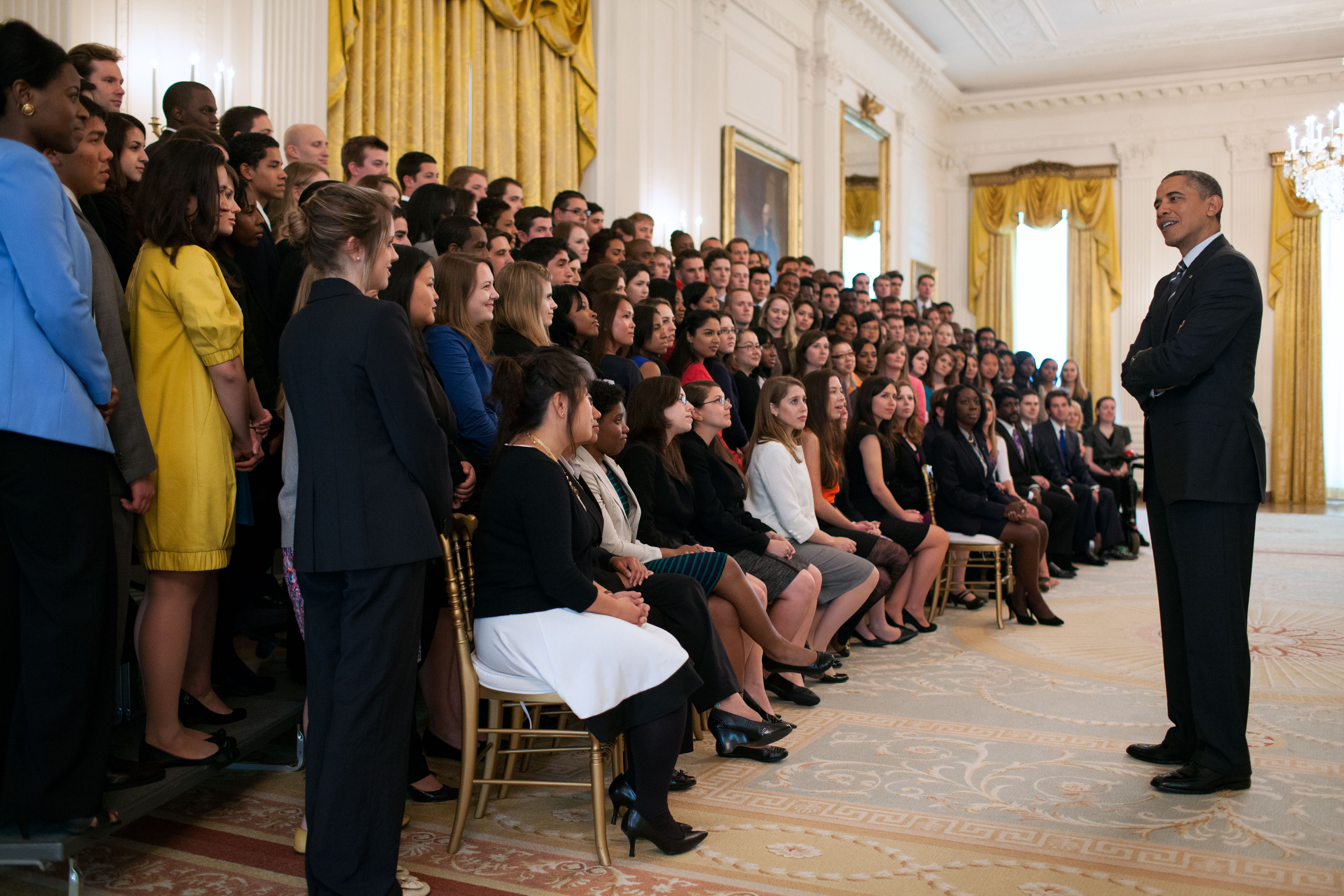
President Barack Obama talking with White House interns in spring 2012

The White House Internship Program was unpaid until 2022, when President Joe Biden signed a bipartisan spending bill that set aside $4.5 million to pay White House interns. However, Trump reversed this and interns are no longer paid.

Interns must be U.S. citizens and at least 18 years of age, and must be either a current student, recent graduate, or veteran of the United States Armed Forces. Those selected for the program are able to work in one of sixteen available presidential departments.

The White House Internship Program is split into three semester seasons: summer, fall, and spring.

In addition to the opportunity to work in the Executive Office of the President, the White House Internship Program also includes a speaker series, tours to sites around Washington, D.C., opportunities to volunteer in the community, and attendance at special events.

== Notable former White House interns ==
- Huma Abedin
- Julian Castro
- Mimi Alford
- Brent Barton
- Jaime Herrera Beutler
- Neil Cavuto
- Ben Coes
- Misha Collins
- Rodney Mims Cook, Jr.
- Rod Dembowski
- Monique Dorsainvil
- Anita Dunn
- Deesha Dyer
- Jim Ferrell
- Trey Martinez Fischer
- Andrew Leon Hanna
- Robert Morales Vergara
- Michael H. Herson
- David Hughes
- Monica Lewinsky
- Daniel Lorenzetti
- Trip MacCracken
- Roger Manno
- Kayleigh McEnany
- Keiffer J. Mitchell, Jr.
- Lisa Monaco
- Lewis J. Paper
- Tan Parker
- Erik Prince
- Richard Norton Smith
- Michael Tubbs
- Brian Williams
- Tyrone Yates

== See also ==
- White House Fellows
- Presidential Management Fellows Program
- Presidential Innovation Fellows
- United States Digital Service
