= Douglas Kelley (disambiguation) =

Douglas Kelley (1912 – 1958) was an American military intelligence officer who served as prison psychiatrist through the Nuremberg Trials.

Douglas Kelley may also refer to:

- Douglas Forsythe Kelley (1928-2021), American industrial designer
- Douglas Kelley, American novelist; his book The Captain's Wife fictionalizes the life of Mary Ann Brown Patten
- Douglas Kelley, American journalist, contributor to Artnet
- Doug Kelley, American lawyer, court-appointed receiver in the Petters Group Worldwide financial case

== See also ==
- Doug Kelly (disambiguation)
