= Gary R. Chiusano =

American politician

Gary Chiusano

Sussex County Surrogate
- Incumbent
- Assumed office February 11, 2013

Member of the New Jersey General Assembly from the 24th Legislative District
- In office January 8, 2008 – February 11, 2013 Serving with Alison Littell McHose
- Preceded by: Guy R. Gregg
- Succeeded by: Parker Space

Director of the Sussex County Board of County Commissioners
- In office January 1, 2006 – January 1, 2007
- Preceded by: Glen Vatrano
- Succeeded by: Susan Zellman

Member of the Sussex County Board of County Commissioners
- In office January 1, 2003 – January 8, 2008

Mayor of Frankford Township
- In office 2001–2003

Member of the Frankford Township
- In office 2001–2003

Personal details
- Born: August 5, 1951 (age 75)
- Party: Republican
- Occupation: Politician

Gary R. Chiusano (born August 5, 1951) is an American Republican Party politician, who served in the New Jersey General Assembly from January 8, 2008 until February 11, 2013, where he represented the 24th Legislative District. He resigned on February 11, 2013, from the New Jersey General Assembly to become the Sussex County Surrogate. Chiusano served in the Assembly on the Commerce and Economic Development Committee and the Financial Institutions and Insurance Committee. He served on the Frankford Township Committee from 2001-2003 as Mayor of Frankford Township, New Jersey and on the Sussex County Board of County Commissioners from 2003 to 2008. Chiusano graduated with a B.S. degree from Drexel University with a major in Business Administration and Finance. He is a resident of Augusta, within Frankford Township, New Jersey.
