= Guy R. Gregg =

American politician

Majority Whip of the New Jersey General Assembly
- In office January 13, 1998 – January 11, 2000
- Preceded by: Thomas S. Smith
- Succeeded by: Kenneth LeFevre

Member of the New Jersey General Assembly from the 24th district
- In office June 16, 1994 – January 8, 2008 Serving with Scott Garrett and Alison Littell McHose
- Preceded by: C. Richard Kamin
- Succeeded by: Gary R. Chiusano

Personal details
- Born: December 14, 1949 (age 76) Brooklyn, New York City, New York
- Party: Republican

Guy R. Gregg (born December 14, 1949, Brooklyn, New York) is an American Republican Party politician, who served in the New Jersey General Assembly from 1992 to 2008, where he represented the 24th Legislative District. He was a candidate for the Republican nomination for United States Senator in 2002.

Gregg served in the Assembly as Republican Conference Leader from 2004 to 2006, was the Majority Whip from 1998 to 1999 and the Assistant Majority Whip from 1996 to 1998. He served in the Assembly on the Human Services Committee and the Labor Committee.

After nearly 40 years in the New Jersey Legislature — making him the longest-serving legislator in New Jersey history — Robert Littell announced on March 6, 2007, that he would not seek reelection to the New Jersey Senate and would retire from office at the end of 2007. Republican Freeholder Steve Oroho and Assemblyman Guy R. Gregg both announced that they would pursue the Republican nomination for Littell's Senate seat in the June 2007 primary. Gregg lost the primary election to Steve Oroho, who was backed by the well-known and Republican favorite Littell family.

== Career ==
As an Assemblyman, Gregg has sponsored legislation eliminating New Jersey's duplicative Sub Chapter S Corporation Tax as well as legislation which would allow vendors to retain 1% of the sales tax they collect, as compensation for administrative costs. The Assemblyman has also sponsored the 10-20-Life Law which permits extended penalties for offenders using weapons during the course of committing a crime. The Assemblyman advocates the 65 mph speed limit increase which he authored, as well as increased mass transportation for the area of the state.

In 2002, Gregg said he would seek the Republican nomination for U.S. Senator. But he dropped out of the race on filing day and endorsed Jim Treffinger, the Essex County Executive and the front runner. Treffinger himself dropped out less than a week later after FBI agents raided his office as part of a big time scandal that later sent Treffinger to jail.

Gregg served in the United States Marine Corps from 1972 to 1975, achieving the rank of First Lieutenant.

Gregg graduated with a B.A. in 1972 from Monmouth College in Psychology. He was born in Brooklyn, New York, and currently resides in Long Valley in Washington Township, Morris County, New Jersey.
