= Douglas Kelly =

Douglas Kelly or Doug Kelly may refer to:

- Douglas Tynwald Kelly (1920–2006), Canadian politician
- Douglas F. Kelly, American theologian
- Doug Kelly (footballer) (born 1934), English professional footballer
- Doug Kelly (journalist), Canadian journalist

== See also ==
- Douglas Kelley (disambiguation)
