= John J. Sinsimer =

American politician

Member of the New Jersey General Assembly from the 24th Legislative District
- In office January 8, 1974 – January 13, 1976 Serving with Barbara A. Curran
- Preceded by: District created
- Succeeded by: Dean Gallo

Member of the New Jersey General Assembly from the 14th at-large district
- In office January 11, 1972 – January 8, 1974
- Preceded by: John F. Evers
- Succeeded by: District abolished

Personal details
- Born: March 19, 1923 Harrison, New Jersey
- Died: September 26, 1997 (aged 74) Pompton Lakes, New Jersey
- Party: Democratic

John J. Sinsimer (March 19, 1923 – September 26, 1997) was an American politician who served in the New Jersey General Assembly from 1972 to 1976.

He died on September 26, 1997, at his home in Pompton Lakes, New Jersey at age 74. He is the only Democrat to have represented the 24th District.
