= Alfred B. Littell =

American politician

Mayor of Franklin, New Jersey
- In office 1956–1957

Member of the Sussex County Board of Chosen Freeholders
- In office 1956–1956

Majority Leader of the New Jersey Senate
- In office 1951–1953

Member of the New Jersey Senate from Sussex County
- In office 1944–1954
- Preceded by: Harry H. Hollinshed
- Succeeded by: George B. Harper

Member of the New Jersey General Assembly
- In office 1940–1943
- In office 1922–1922

Personal details
- Born: Alfred Beattie Littell; July 1, 1893 Bethlehem, Pennsylvania, United States
- Died: December 12, 1970 (aged 77) Guadalaraja, Mexico
- Party: Republican
- Spouse: Dorothy A. Kershner
- Children: 5, including Robert
- Education: Lawrenceville School
- Alma mater: Princeton University

Alfred Beattie Littell (July 1, 1893 – December 12, 1970) was an American Republican Party politician who served as a member of both houses of the New Jersey Legislature and as President of the New Jersey State Senate in 1951. He was the father of State Senator Robert Littell and grandfather of Assemblywoman Alison Littell McHose.

== Biography ==
Littell was born in 1893 in Bethlehem, Pennsylvania. He attended Lawrenceville School and then entered Princeton University. His studies were interrupted by the entry of the United States into World War I. He enlisted on December 14, 1917, in the 3rd Field Artillery Regiment. He was discharged on August 11, 1919, with the rank of battalion sergeant major. He completed his studies at Princeton and graduated in 1920. Littell represented Sussex County in the New Jersey General Assembly in 1922 and again from 1940 to 1943. He then served in the New Jersey Senate from 1943 to 1953. In 1951 he became Senate President. After retiring from the Senate, he served as Sussex County Freeholder in 1956 and as Mayor of Franklin, New Jersey from 1956 to 1957. In 1970, Littell died at the age of 77 in Guadalaraja, Mexico while on vacation with his wife Dorothy.

== Family ==
On October 17, 1927, Littell married Dorothy A. Kershner, daughter of Eugene K. and Claribel (Waters) Kershner. They had five children: Nancy Ann, Richard Watson, Philip Beattie, Sally Vincent, and Robert Eugene. Robert Littell (born January 9, 1936) went on to serve in the Assembly from 1968 to 1990 and in the State Senate from 1990 to 2008. Littell's granddaughter Alison Littell McHose served in the Assembly from 2003 to 2015, representing the 24th legislative district.

Political offices
Preceded by Samuel L. Bodine	President of the New Jersey Senate; 1951	Succeeded by Harold W. Hannold
