= Douglas Forsythe Kelley =

Industrial designer (1928–2021)

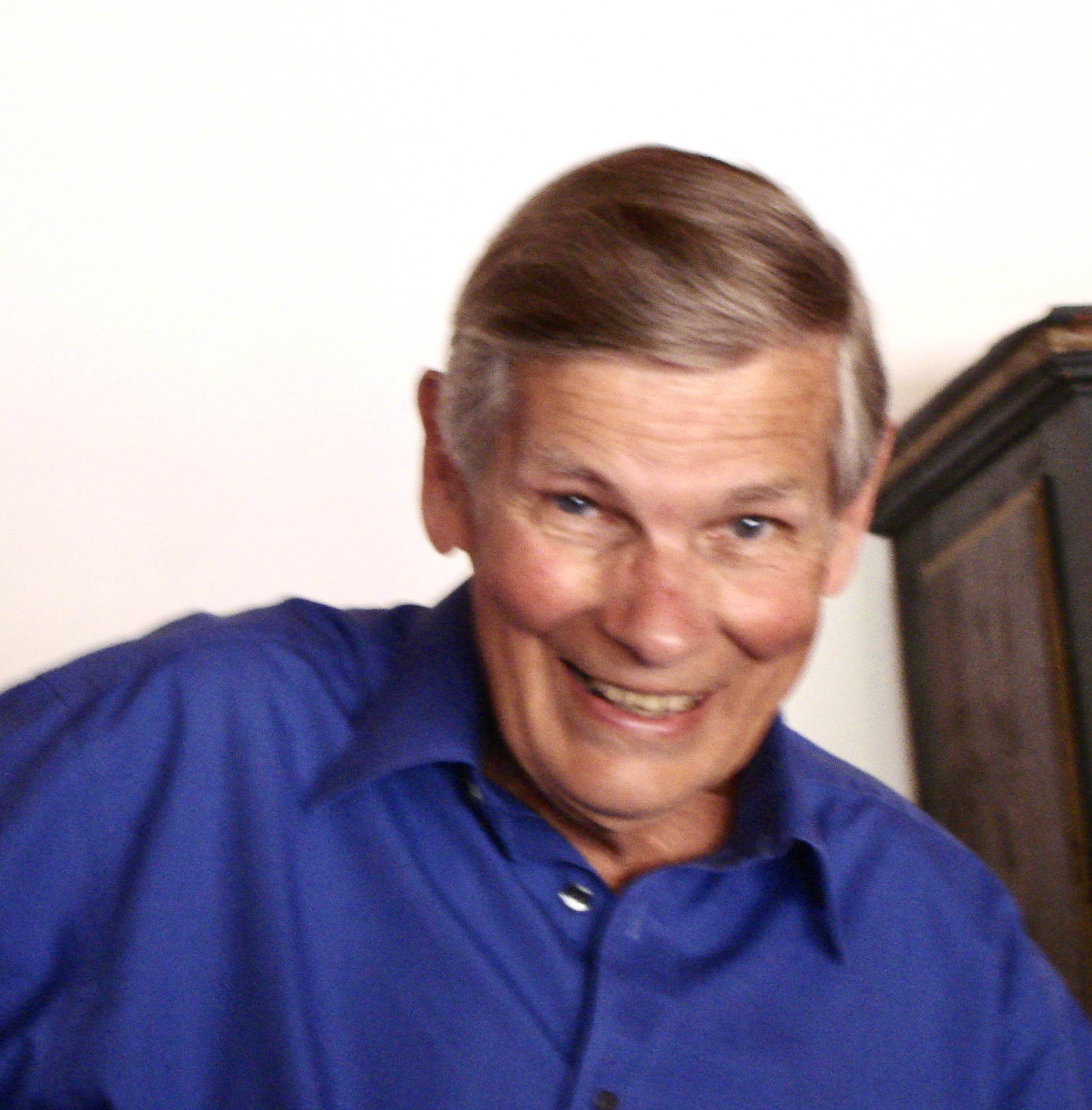
Douglas Kelley

Douglas Forsythe Kelley (August 9, 1928 – November 21, 2021) was an American industrial designer who was known for designing the T-chair and the Elna Lotus sewing machine.

== Life and career ==
Kelley was born in Buffalo, New York, on August 9, 1928. He studied at Pratt Institute in New York City, where he met Ross Littell and William Katavolos. They started work for Laverne Originals, a furniture company created by Estelle and Erwine Laverne, designing furniture, textiles, and dinnerware. While at Laverne, they designed the 'T-chair', which won the A.I.D. (American Society of Interior Designers) Award in 1952 for the best furniture design in the United States. The chair has three legs of chrome steel, connected by a T-shaped stretcher in black enamelled steel. The sales brochure for the chair explained: 'We sought furniture that would work within a way of building, which would not complement or compete but in a sense continue the program of lines and planes and function as structural elements of the whole'. The chair is now part of the permanent collections of MOMA, the Art Institute of Chicago, the Metropolitan Museum in New York, the Vitra Design Museum, and the Victoria & Albert Museum.

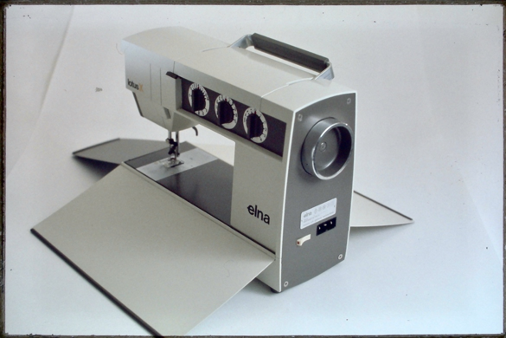
Elna Lotus sewing machine, designed by Douglas Kelley.

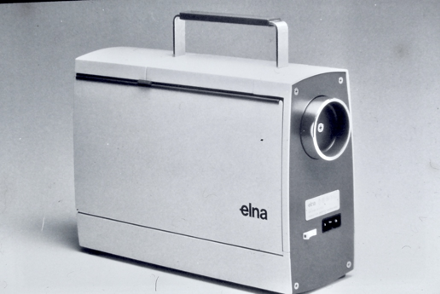
Elna Lotus sewing machine (closed)

Kelley subsequently joined La Compagnie de l’Esthetique Industrielle (CEI) in Paris as managing director, at the invitation of Raymond Loewy. He spent six years there (1960–1966), and collaborated on the design of the iconic Elna Lotus sewing machine. He then resigned to head the newly established design office of Lippincott and Margulies in London. Shortly thereafter, he formed Douglas Kelley Associates, located in Jermyn Street, London.

Kelley died in London on November 21, 2021, at the age of 93.
