= C. Richard Kamin =

American politician

Chair of the New Jersey Republican State Committee
- In office 2001–2005 Serving with Joseph M. Kyrillos (2001–04)
- Preceded by: Chuck Haytaian
- Succeeded by: Tom Wilson

Member of the New Jersey General Assembly
- In office September 8, 1986 – April 25, 1994 Serving with William E. Schluter, Leonard Lance and Scott Garrett
- Preceded by: Karl Weidel
- Succeeded by: Guy R. Gregg
- Constituency: 23rd district (1986–1992); 24th district (1992–1994)

Personal details
- Born: July 8, 1944 (age 82) Niagara Falls, New York
- Party: Republican

C. Richard Kamin (born July 8, 1944) is an American Republican Party politician from Morris County, New Jersey who served in the New Jersey General Assembly from 1986 to 1994. He also served as director of the New Jersey Division of Motor Vehicles, where his tenure ended in a bid rigging scandal involving state vehicle emissions testing.

== Political career ==
In 1983, Kamin was elected as chair of the Morris County Republican organization. He was challenged for his position unsuccessfully by Parsippany mayor Frank B. Priore. State senator John Dorsey attempted to remove him as chair, unsuccessfully. He served as chair for five terms and resigned in 1986 to take his seat in the New Jersey General Assembly.

=== New Jersey General Assembly ===
Kamin was elected to the New Jersey General Assembly in a 1986 special election to fill the vacant seat of Karl Weidel, who had resigned to join the New Jersey Department of Insurance.

In the Assembly, Kamin opposed a 1991 health care reform bill, particularly the provision of a $72 million surcharge on hospitals intended to finance pilot projects to reduce costs for the ininsured, which he said would lead to higher billing rates and overall increases in medical costs. He also called for a balanced budget and criticized the administration of James Florio for reporting a budget shortfall that was $768 million greater than projections.

In 1991, Kamin spent $112,000, more than any other incumbent Assembly member, on his primary re-election campaign.

In 1993, Kamin attended a trip to South Africa as part of an American delegation sent to ensure women were allowed to vote in the first post-apartheid elections. State senator Walter J. Kavanaugh also attended the trip.

=== Whitman administration ===
In 1994, Kamin was appointed director of the state Division of Motor Vehicles (DMV) by Christine Todd Whitman. Whitman publicly committed to improving the public experience with the DMV, one of the few state agencies with regular public contact.

In 1997, Kamin introduced new electronically printed vehicle inspection stickers, which were intended to reduce theft in anticipation of the state's new enhanced emissions standards, which were expected to make inspections more difficult to pass and increase the demand for theft or forgery of inspection stickers. In 1998, he led efforts to modernize the state drivers' license by including microchips with digital information on drivers. After that proposal was rejected due to widespread opposition led by the American Civil Liberties Union of New Jersey, Kamin's successor in the legislature, Guy R. Gregg, introduced a bill to create a digital drivers' license. Kamin argued that a digital license would be more difficult to forge and prevent errors.

Kamin was removed as DMV director in 2000, after the disastrous application of the new emissions test. After thousands of drivers waited in cars across the state for hours to pass the new requirements, an investigation revealed that senior officials within the DMV had been aware the system would not work but concealed that information. It was later revealed that Parsons Infrastructure and Technology Group, the company hired to operate the testing program, had manipulated the state bidding process to win the contract. Kamin was offered another position within the New Jersey Department of Transportation, which he accepted.

=== Later career ===
In 2001, he was named as co-chair of the Republican State Committee by Republican nominee for governor Bret Schundler. He served as a key advisor to Schundler, who was a relative political outsider with few ties to the Republican Party establishment in Trenton. During the campaign, it was disclosed that Kamin met with Parsons officials in 1997 and 1998, and that the meetings provided Parsons officials with details on job specifications for the new system weeks before they were released to other bidders. Schundler's opponent, Jim McGreevey, made an issue of the Parsons scandal and Kamin's appointment as co-chair of the party. He served as co-chair until 2005.

In 2008, Kamin was co-chair of the Mitt Romney campaign in New Jersey.

In 2018, Kamin back Ron DeFilippis for Morris County Republican chairman and publicly called for Robert Zwigard to end his campaign for Morris County Republican chair, citing reports that Zwigard pushed candidates for endorsements under threat of political retribution. After DeFilippis won by four votes, he appointed Kamin as political director for the county organization.

In the 2021 gubernatorial election, Kamin endorsed Jack Ciattarelli for the Republican nomination. He also supported the introduction of an organizational or county line in Morris, which other former chairs opposed in favor of open primaries.

New Jersey General Assembly
Preceded by Karl Weidel	Member of the New Jersey General Assembly from the 23rd district September 8, 1986–January 14, 1992; Served alongside: William E. Schluter, Leonard Lance	Succeeded by Chuck Haytaian
Preceded by Chuck Haytaian	Member of the New Jersey General Assembly from the 24th district January 14, 1992–April 25, 1994; Served alongside: Scott Garrett	Succeeded by Guy R. Gregg
