= Chuck Haytaian =

American politician (1938–2024)

164th Speaker of the New Jersey General Assembly
- In office January 10, 1992 – January 9, 1996
- Preceded by: Joseph Doria
- Succeeded by: Jack Collins

Member of the New Jersey General Assembly
- In office January 12, 1982 – January 9, 1996 Serving with Robert E. Littell and Leonard Lance
- Preceded by: Donald J. Albanese
- Succeeded by: Connie Myers
- Constituency: 24th district (1982–1992); 23rd district (1992–1996)

Personal details
- Born: January 28, 1938 New York City, New York, U.S.
- Died: November 1, 2024 (aged 86)
- Party: Republican
- Education: University of Alabama (BS)

Garabed "Chuck" Haytaian (January 28, 1938 – November 1, 2024) was an American businessman and Republican Party politician who represented Hunterdon, Sussex and Warren counties in northwestern New Jersey as a member of the New Jersey General Assembly from 1982 to 1996. From 1992 until 1996, he served as Assembly speaker and a leader of the Republican tax revolt. In 1994, he was the Republican nominee for United States Senate, losing a competitive race to Democratic incumbent Frank Lautenberg.

== Early life and education ==
Garabed Haytaian was born on January 28, 1938 in the Bronx. His parents were Armenian genocide survivors.

== Political career ==
=== Warren County freeholder ===
Haytaian became engaged in local politics as president of the Kiwanis Club and a member of the Mansfield Township school board. In 1974, he ran for Warren County freeholder but was defeated by Benjamin Bosco by around 700 votes amid the Democratic wave in the wake of the Watergate scandal. In 1975, Haytaian ran for freeholder again and defeated Christopher Maier by roughly 40 votes. As freeholder, Haytaian unsuccessfully petitioned state senator Wayne Dumont to block Maier's appointment to another freeholder seat using senatorial courtesy. Haytaian and Dumont maintained a grudge until the latter died in 1992.

In 1978, Haytaian declined to run for U.S. representative against Democratic incumbent Helen Meyner. Instead, he endorsed the eventual winner, Jim Courter. He was re-elected as freeholder with 62 percent of the vote over Michael Perrucci. At the time, Haytaian was the only Republican on the three-member board of freeholders.

=== New Jersey General Assembly ===
In 1981, incumbent assemblyman Donald Albanese ran for governor of New Jersey before dropping out to challenge Wayne Dumont for state senate. Haytaian ran for his open seat as the running mate of incumbent assemblyman Robert Littell. In the Republican primary, they defeated Sparta mayor Mark Memoly and county employee Louis Naleboff and won the general election with two-thirds of the vote.

In January 1984, Haytaian joined an insurgent group of Republicans to oust four incumbent members of the party leadership (Marie Muhler, Doc Villane, Karl Weidel, and Joseph Chinnici). In that year, five of the eight Republican leadership roles required a runoff election. The coup weakened party leader Dean Gallo, who left the Assembly upon his election to the U.S. House of Representatives later that year, and set up the ascent of Chuck Hardwick as minority leader and Haytaian's election as his assistant minority leader in 1985. After Republicans won control of the Assembly in the 1985 elections, Hardwick became speaker, and Haytaian became majority leader.

In 1989, Haytaian and Littell defeated a primary challenge from former Sussex County prosecutor George Daggett and radio commentator Wallace Wirths. Although Republicans lost the majority in the Assembly that year, they won a supermajority two years later amid opposition to the tax increase passed under Governor Jim Florio, and Haytaian was elected speaker of the Assembly.

==== 1994 United States Senate campaign ====
Shortly after Christine Todd Whitman defeated Florio in the 1993 gubernatorial election, Haytaian announced his campaign for U.S. Senate against incumbent Frank Lautenberg. Haytaian centered his campaign on his claim that Lautenberg had lost touch with New Jersey and claimed that he was soft on crime, had opposed federal spending cuts, and had refused to release his tax returns. In one debate, he challenged Lautenberg to name all twenty-one counties in the state.

Lautenberg won the election. Despite trailing by a wide margin in early polling, Haytaian received 47 percent of the vote.

=== Later career ===
From 1995 through 2001, Haytaian was chair of the Republican State Committee.

In 1996, Beth Herbert, an administrative assistant at the State House, brought sexual harassment charges against Haytaian. She claimed that over a fifteen-month period, Haytaian would periodically call her into his office and molest her. The worst incidents, according to Herbert, took place after his failed Senate bid in 1994. Haytaian countersued Herbert for defamation.

In 1997, New Jersey paid Herbert $175,000 in a settlement to avoid what they believed would be a more costly legal battle.

== Personal life and death ==
He was a resident of Independence Township, New Jersey.

Haytaian died on November 1, 2024, at the age of 86.

== See also ==
- List of American politicians of Armenian descent

New Jersey General Assembly
Preceded by Leanna Brown; Dean Gallo	Member of the New Jersey General Assembly from the 24th district 1982–1992; Served alongside: Robert E. Littell, Scott Garrett	Succeeded by C. Richard Kamin
Preceded by C. Richard Kamin	Member of the New Jersey General Assembly from the 23rd district 1992–1996; Served alongside: Leonard Lance	Succeeded by Connie Myers
Political offices
Preceded by Joseph Doria	Speaker of the New Jersey General Assembly; 1992–1996	Succeeded by Jack Collins
Party political offices
Preceded by Virginia Littell	Chairman of the New Jersey Republican State Committee; 1995–2001	Succeeded by Joe Kyrillos
Preceded by Pete Dawkins	Republican nominee for U.S. Senator from New Jersey (Class 1); 1994	Succeeded by Bob Franks
