= Barbara A. Curran =

American politician and judge (1940–2022)

Judge of the New Jersey Superior Court
- In office 1993–2000
- Governor: James Florio

Member of the New Jersey General Assembly from the 24th district
- In office January 8, 1974 – June 23, 1980 Serving with John J. Sinsimer and Dean Gallo
- Preceded by: District created
- Succeeded by: Leanna Brown

Personal details
- Born: August 26, 1940 New York City, New York
- Died: January 29, 2022 (aged 81)
- Party: Republican
- Education: St. Mary-of-the-Woods College (BA); Syracuse University (MA); Seton Hall University (JD)

Barbara A. Curran (August 26, 1940 – January 29, 2022) was an American politician, attorney, and judge who served as a member of the New Jersey General Assembly, New Jersey Superior Court, and New Jersey Board of Public Utilities.

== Early life and education ==
Curran was born in New York City. She earned a Bachelor of Arts from Saint Mary-of-the-Woods College, Master of Arts from Syracuse University, and Juris Doctor from the Seton Hall University School of Law.

== Career ==
Curran served as a member of the New Jersey General Assembly from the 24th Legislative District from 1974 to 1980.

She was a commissioner of the New Jersey Board of Public Utilities from June 1980 to 1988 and was its president from 1982.

In 1992, Curran was nominated to serve as a judge of the New Jersey Superior Court by James Florio.

== Personal life and death ==
She died on January 29, 2022, at the age of 81.
