= 1994 United States Senate election in New Jersey =

- November 8, 1994
- Turnout: 55% (▼22pp)
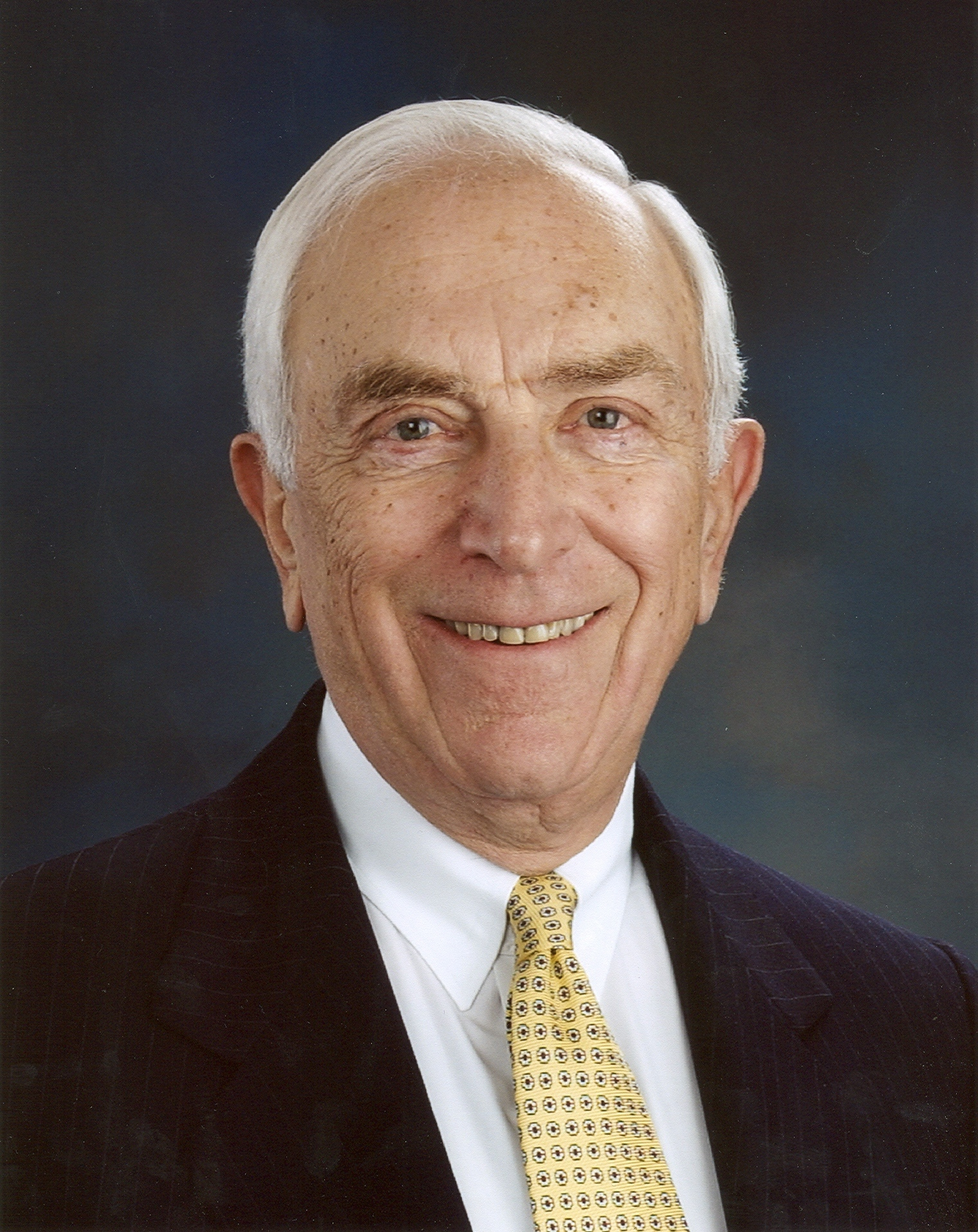

Nominee	Frank Lautenberg	Chuck Haytaian
Party	Democratic	Republican
Popular vote	1,033,487	966,244
Percentage	50.29%	47.02%
- Lautenberg: 40–50% 50–60% 60–70% 70–80% Haytaian: 40–50% 50–60% 60–70%
U.S. senator before election
Frank Lautenberg
Democratic
Elected U.S. Senator
Frank Lautenberg
Democratic

The 1994 United States Senate Election in New Jersey was held November 8, 1994. Incumbent Democratic U.S. Senator Frank Lautenberg won re-election to a third term.

Haytaian remarked after the race that he was most disappointed by the margins of his losses in Bergen and Middlesex counties.

== Democratic primary ==
=== Candidates ===
- Frank Lautenberg, incumbent United States senator since 1983
- Bill Campbell, licensed computer engineer for PSE&G
- Lynne A. Speed, follower of the LaRouche movement from Ridgefield Park

=== Results ===
Democratic primary Results
Party	Candidate	Votes	%
Democratic	Frank Lautenberg (incumbent)	151,416	80.9%
Democratic	Bill Campbell	26,066	13.94%
Democratic	Lynne A. Speed	9,563	5.11%
Total votes		187,045	100

== Republican primary ==
=== Candidates ===
- Chuck Haytaian, speaker of the New Jersey State Assembly
- Brian T. Kennedy, former state senator from Manasquan

==== Declined ====
- Bill Gormley, state senator from Margate City and candidate for governor in 1989
- Marge Roukema, U.S. representative from Ridgewood
- Dick Zimmer, U.S. representative from Delaware Township

=== Results ===
Republican primary Results
Party	Candidate	Votes	%
Republican	Chuck Haytaian	126,768	67.32%
Republican	Brian T. Kennedy	61,532	32.68%
Total votes		188,300	100

== General election ==
=== Candidates ===
- Arlene Gold (Natural Law)
- Ben Grindlinger (Libertarian)
- Chuck Haytaian, speaker of the New Jersey General Assembly (Republican)
- Michael Kelly (Keep America First)
- Joanne Kuniansky (Socialist Workers)
- Frank Lautenberg, incumbent U.S. senator since 1983 (Democratic)
- Andrea Lippi (Jobs, Property Rights)
- Richard J. Pezzullo (Conservative)
- George Patrick Predham (Damn Drug Dealers)

=== Campaign ===
Lautenberg took no part in much of the summer campaign, delegating duties to his campaign director David Eichenbaum. Haytaian became so frustrated with the Senator's absence that he referred to Eichenbaum as Lautenberg's "paid mouthpiece" and his campaign aides began to refer to "Senator Eichenbaum" in their campaign materials.

Haytaian centered his campaign on reducing federal taxes through the institution of a flat federal income tax of 18.5%. Throughout the campaign, Haytaian emphasized taxes and fiscal issues over social issues. Eichenbaum, standing in for Lautenberg, referred to Haytaian's flat tax as a "giveaway to the rich" and criticized Haytaian as a "hypocrite" for previously opposing a flat state tax plan because it would have eliminated home mortgage interest and state and local tax deductions. Haytaian fired back that in 1982, Lautenberg had called a flat tax "the only one that can quickly close the loopholes."

Campaign advertisements for both candidates were highly negative. Both candidates positioned themselves as tough on crime and taxes, which polling showed were the two major issues in the state. Haytaian stressed his support for the death penalty and Lautenberg's opposition.

Abortion was also an issue; Lautenberg supported abortion rights, while Haytaian favored mandatory waiting periods, parental notification for minors, and a ban on federal funding of abortion except in cases of rape, incest, or where necessary to save the life of a pregnant mother. In the past, Haytaian had supported a constitutional ban.

=== Debates ===
Lautenberg agreed to two debates on October 15 and 25.

=== Endorsements ===
Frank Lautenberg

Federal executive branch officials

- Bill Clinton, 42nd President of the United States

Individuals

- H. Ross Perot, businessman and independent candidate for President in 1992
Chuck Haytaian

Federal legislators

- Newt Gingrich, U.S. Representative from Georgia and House Minority Whip

State executive branch officials

- Christine Todd Whitman, Governor of New Jersey

State legislators

- Willie B. Brown, Assemblyman from New Jersey's 29th legislative district (Democratic)
- John E. Rooney, Assemblyman from New Jersey's 39th legislative district

Local officials

- Albert M. "Bo" Calloway, Trenton City Councilman (Democratic)

Individuals

- Bob Grant, conservative talk radio host

=== Polling ===
Poll source	Date(s) administered	Sample size (Note: Key: A – all adults RV – registered voters LV – likely voters V – unclear)	Margin of error	Frank Lautenberg (D)	Chuck Haytaian (R)	Other/ Undecided
Rutgers-Eagleton	June 14–16, 1994	620 LV	±4.0%	57%	30%	12%
Rutgers-Eagleton	Aug. 30–Sep. 6, 1994	598 LV	±4.0%	52%	27%	21%
Rutgers-Eagleton	October 16–20, 1994	586 LV	±4.0%	48%	35%	17%
Rutgers-Eagleton	November 2–4, 1994	780 LV	±3.5%	49%	35%	16%

=== Results ===
1994 U.S. Senate Election in New Jersey
Party	Candidate	Votes	%	±%
Democratic	Frank Lautenberg (incumbent)	1,033,487	50.29%	▼3.36
Republican	Chuck Haytaian	966,244	47.02%	▲1.84
Keep America First	Michael P. Kelly	14,343	0.70%	N/A
Libertarian	Ben Grindlinger	14,042	0.68%	▲0.27
Conservative	Richard J. Pezzullo	9,387	0.46%	N/A
Jobs, Property Rights	Andrea Lippi	6,303	0.31%	N/A
Damn Drug Dealers	George Patrick Predham	4,226	0.20%	N/A
Socialist Workers	Joanne Kuniansky	3,606	0.18%	Steady
Natural Law	Arlene Gold	3,249	0.16%	N/A
Majority		67,243	3.27	−5.10%
Total votes		2,054,887	100.0%	N/A
Democratic hold				

==== By county ====
By county

County	Lautenberg votes	Lautenberg %	Haytaian votes	Haytaian %	Other votes	Other %
Atlantic	29,161	52.6%	25,071	45.2%	1,257	2.3%
Bergen	131,252	50.8%	122,843	47.6%	4,165	1.6%
Burlington	50,473	49.3%	47,974	46.9%	3,912	3.9%
Camden	70,288	58.5%	44,799	37.3%	5,058	4.2%
Cape May	14,398	44.4%	16,931	52.2%	1,079	3.4%
Cumberland	14,657	48.4%	14,458	47.7%	1,182	4.0%
Essex	107,082	62.7%	60,671	35.5%	3,116	1.8%
Gloucester	34,458	50.6%	30,429	44.7%	3,231	3.8%
Hudson	67,532	64.8%	34,211	32.8%	2,430	2.3%
Hunterdon	11,792	33.7%	22,179	63.4%	989	2.8%
Mercer	46,175	53.8%	37,266	43.4%	2,432	2.8%
Middlesex	90,873	53.6%	72,787	42.9%	5,993	3.5%
Monmouth	75,636	46.4%	83,534	51.2%	3,888	2.5%
Morris	49,241	38.7%	75,717	59.5%	2,237	1.8%
Ocean	59,405	42.5%	76,250	54.6%	3,976	2.8%
Passaic	48,067	49.2%	47,152	48.2%	2,563	2.7%
Salem	8,876	45.8%	9,577	49.5%	906	3.7%
Somerset	31,978	41.7%	42,812	55.8%	1,931	2.6%
Sussex	11,332	31.0%	24,024	65.7%	1,195	3.3%
Union	70,904	53.0%	60,195	45.0%	2,661	1.9%
Warren	9,907	35.1%	17,364	61.5%	955	3.4%
Total	1,033,488	50.3%	966,244	47.0%	55,156	2.7%

Counties that flipped from Democratic to Republican

- Monmouth

== See also ==
- 1994 United States Senate elections
