= New Jersey's 24th legislative district =

American legislative district

- Senator: Parker Space (R)
- Assembly members: Dawn Fantasia (R); Mike Inganamort (R)
- Registration: 41.48% Republican; 24.13% Democratic; 33.09% unaffiliated
- Demographics: 82.6% White; 2.7% Black/African American; 0.2% Native American; 3.2% Asian; 0.0% Hawaiian/Pacific Islander; 3.1% Other race; 8.1% Two or more races; 10.2% Hispanic
- Population: 210,381
- Voting-age population: 169,605
- Registered voters: 172,764

New Jersey's 24th legislative district is one of 40 in the New Jersey Legislature. The district includes the Morris County municipalities of Chester, Chester Township, Mount Olive Township, Netcong, Roxbury, and Washington Township; all of Sussex County; and the Warren County municipalities of Allamuchy Township and Independence Township.

== Demographic characteristics ==
As of the 2020 United States census the district had a population of 210,381, of whom 169,605 (80.6%) were of voting age. The racial makeup of the district was 173,788 (82.6%) White, 5,752 (2.7%) African American, 489 (0.2%) Native American, 6,651 (3.2%) Asian, 30 (0.0%) Pacific Islander, 6,617 (3.1%) from some other race, and 17,054 (8.1%) from two or more races. Hispanic or Latino of any race were 21,356 (10.2%) of the population.

The 24th district had 172,764 registered voters as of December 1, 2021, of whom 59,069 (34.2%) were registered as unaffiliated, 70,648 (40.9%) were registered as Republicans, 40,518 (23.5%) were registered as Democrats, and 2,529 (1.5%) were registered to other parties.

As of 2000, the district had the fourth-smallest population of any in the state and the third highest land area, making it one of the least densely populated districts in the state. The district has an extremely small minority population, with comparatively few African American (at 1.3%, the state's second lowest), Asian and Hispanic residents, and has the smallest percentage of residents age 65 and over (8.9%). Registered Republicans outnumber Democrats by a better than 3-1 margin and the district has the highest percentage of registered Republicans and the lowest percentage of Democrats.

== Political representation ==
For the 2026–2027 session, the 24th legislative district of the New Jersey Legislature is represented in the State Senate by Parker Space (R, Wantage Township) and in the General Assembly by Dawn Fantasia (R, Franklin) and Mike Inganamort (R, Chester Township).

The legislative district overlaps with New Jersey's 5th and 7th congressional districts.

== Apportionment history ==
Upon the creation of the 40-district legislative map in 1973, the 24th district from this point until 1981 was a narrow district running from New Providence and Summit in Union County, through eastern Morris County, into north-central Passaic County including Pompton Lakes, Bloomingdale, and Wanaque. After the 1981 redistricting, the district shape took on boundaries similar to its present limits. It included all of Sussex County except Stanhope, and all of Warren County except Franklin Township, Greenwich Township, and the Borough and Township of Washington. In the 1990s, the 24th consisted of all of Sussex County, western Morris County, and northern Hunterdon County (all municipalities in Warren County were removed). Hunterdon County's Lebanon Township, Hampton, Glen Gardner, and High Bridge were shifted to the 23rd district in the 2001 redistricting leaving only Califon and Tewksbury Township as Hunterdon County's portion of the 24th district; no other changes were made in this redistricting.

When the 1981 redistricting occurred following the results of the 1980 United States census, State Senator James P. Vreeland and Assembly members Dean Gallo and Leanna Brown were shifted to the 26th legislative district, with all three winning re-election in their new district. Meanwhile, the old 15th legislative district essentially became the new 24th district.

In the face of difficulties recovering from a stroke he had suffered in October 1988, Wayne Dumont had been in deteriorating health and stepped down from the Senate in July 1990. Assemblyman Robert Littell was chosen by a special convention of Republican committee members from Sussex and Warren Counties to fill Dumont's vacancy in the Senate. In turn, Scott Garrett was chosen to fill Littell's vacant seat in the Assembly.

Robert Littell chose not to run for re-election in 2007 and by the time he had left office in 2008 had become the longest-serving legislator in New Jersey history, having served a total of 40 years in office. When his daughter Alison Littell McHose took office in the Assembly in 2004, they became the legislature's first father-daughter combination to serve simultaneously in the legislature.

Parker Space took office in March 2013, filling the seat vacated by Gary R. Chiusano, who had been chosen to fill a vacancy as Sussex County Surrogate. On October 17, 2015, Littell McHose resigned her seat to work full-time at her position as Franklin Borough's administrator. Sussex County Freeholder Gail Phoebus who had been chosen in the June 2015 primary election to run and was elected in the November general election was appointed to the seat and sworn in late in the legislative term on December 3.

Changes made as part of the New Jersey Legislative apportionment in 2011 added Allamuchy Township, Belvidere Town, Blairstown Township, Frelinghuysen Township, Hardwick Township, Hope Township, Independence Township, Knowlton Township, Liberty Township, Oxford Township and White Township (all from District 23). Removed were Califon and Tewksbury Township (to District 23); and Chester Borough, Chester Township, Netcong and Washington Township (Morris) (all to District 25).

== Election history ==
| Session | Senate | General Assembly | |
|---|---|---|---|
| 1974–1975 | James P. Vreeland (R) | Barbara A. Curran (R) | John J. Sinsimer (D) |
| 1976–1977 | James P. Vreeland (R) | Barbara A. Curran (R) | Dean Gallo (R) |
| 1978–1979 | James P. Vreeland (R) | Barbara A. Curran (R) | Dean Gallo (R) |
| 1980–1981 | James P. Vreeland (R) | Barbara A. Curran (R) (Note: Resigned June 23, 1980 to become a commissioner on the Board of Public Utilities) | Dean Gallo (R) |
| 1980–1981 | James P. Vreeland (R) | Leanna Brown (R) (Note: Elected to the Assembly in November 1980 special election, sworn in on November 24, 1980) | Dean Gallo (R) |
| 1982–1983 | Wayne Dumont (R) | Chuck Haytaian (R) | Robert Littell (R) |
| 1984–1985 | Wayne Dumont (R) | Chuck Haytaian (R) | Robert Littell (R) |
| 1986–1987 | Wayne Dumont (R) | Chuck Haytaian (R) | Robert Littell (R) |
| 1988–1989 | Wayne Dumont (R) (Note: Resigned July 1, 1990 for health reasons) | Chuck Haytaian (R) | Robert Littell (R) |
| 1990–1991 | Wayne Dumont (R) | Chuck Haytaian (R) | Robert Littell (R) (Note: Appointed to the Senate on September 24, 1990, won a November 1990 special election to complete the unexpired term) |
| 1990–1991 | Robert Littell (R) | Chuck Haytaian (R) | Scott Garrett (R) (Note: Appointed to the Assembly on November 19, 1990) |
| 1992–1993 | Robert Littell (R) | C. Richard Kamin (R) | Scott Garrett (R) |
| 1994–1995 | Robert Littell (R) | C. Richard Kamin (R) (Note: Resigned April 25, 1994 to become director of the Motor Vehicle Commission) | Scott Garrett (R) |
| 1994–1995 | Robert Littell (R) | Guy R. Gregg (R) (Note: Appointed to the Assembly on June 16, 1994, elected in November 1994 special election to complete the unexpired term) | Scott Garrett (R) |
| 1996–1997 | Robert Littell (R) | Guy R. Gregg (R) | Scott Garrett (R) |
| 1998–1999 | Robert Littell (R) | Guy R. Gregg (R) | Scott Garrett (R) |
| 2000–2001 | Robert Littell (R) | Guy R. Gregg (R) | Scott Garrett (R) |
| 2002–2003 | Robert Littell (R) | Guy R. Gregg (R) | Scott Garrett (R) (Note: Resigned January 3, 2003 upon his election to Congress) |
| 2002–2003 | Robert Littell (R) | Guy R. Gregg (R) | Alison Littell McHose (R) (Note: Appointed to the Assembly on February 4, 2003) |
| 2004–2005 | Robert Littell (R) | Guy R. Gregg (R) | Alison Littell McHose (R) |
| 2006–2007 | Robert Littell (R) | Guy R. Gregg (R) | Alison Littell McHose (R) |
| 2008–2009 | Steve Oroho (R) | Gary R. Chiusano (R) | Alison Littell McHose (R) |
| 2010–2011 | Steve Oroho (R) | Gary R. Chiusano (R) | Alison Littell McHose (R) |
| 2012–2013 | Steve Oroho (R) | Gary R. Chiusano (R) (Note: Resigned February 11, 2013 to become Sussex County Surrogate) | Alison Littell McHose (R) |
| 2012–2013 | Steve Oroho (R) | Parker Space (R) (Note: Appointed to the Assembly on February 23, 2013) | Alison Littell McHose (R) |
| 2014-2015 | Steve Oroho (R) | Parker Space (R) | Alison Littell McHose (R) (Note: Resigned October 17, 2015) |
| 2014-2015 | Steve Oroho (R) | Parker Space (R) | Gail Phoebus (R) (Note: Appointed to the Assembly on December 3, 2015) |
| 2016–2017 | Steve Oroho (R) | Parker Space (R) | Gail Phoebus (R) |
| 2018–2019 | Steve Oroho (R) | Parker Space (R) | Hal Wirths (R) |
| 2020–2021 | Steve Oroho (R) | Parker Space (R) | Hal Wirths (R) |
| 2022–2023 | Steve Oroho (R) | Parker Space (R) | Hal Wirths (R) |
| 2024–2025 | Parker Space (R) | Dawn Fantasia (R) | Mike Inganamort (R) |
| 2026–2027 | Parker Space (R) | Dawn Fantasia (R) | Mike Inganamort (R) |

== Election results ==
=== Senate ===
2021 New Jersey general election
| Party | Candidate | Votes | % | ±% |
|---|---|---|---|---|
| Republican | Steve Oroho | 52,628 | 69.4 | ▲8.4 |
| Democratic | Frederick P. Cook | 23,240 | 30.6 | ▼8.4 |
| Total votes | | 75,868 | 100.0 | |

New Jersey general election, 2017
| Party | Candidate | Votes | % | ±% |
|---|---|---|---|---|
| Republican | Steve Oroho | 35,641 | 61.0 | ▼9.4 |
| Democratic | Jennifer Hamilton | 22,760 | 39.0 | ▲9.4 |
| Total votes | | 58,401 | 100.0 | |

New Jersey general election, 2013
| Party | Candidate | Votes | % | ±% |
|---|---|---|---|---|
| Republican | Steve Oroho | 38,819 | 70.4 | ▲4.4 |
| Democratic | Richard D. Tomko | 16,292 | 29.6 | ▼4.4 |
| Total votes | | 55,111 | 100.0 | |

2011 New Jersey general election
| Party | Candidate | Votes | % |
|---|---|---|---|
| Republican | Steve Oroho | 21,044 | 66.0 |
| Democratic | Edwin Selby | 10,837 | 34.0 |
| Total votes | | 31,881 | 100.0 |

2007 New Jersey general election
| Party | Candidate | Votes | % | ±% |
|---|---|---|---|---|
| Republican | Steve Oroho | 31,143 | 69.5 | ▲1.4 |
| Democratic | Edwin C. Selby | 13,694 | 30.5 | ▼1.4 |
| Total votes | | 44,837 | 100.0 | |

2003 New Jersey general election
| Party | Candidate | Votes | % | ±% |
|---|---|---|---|---|
| Republican | Robert E. Littell | 23,106 | 68.1 | ▼6.3 |
| Democratic | James D. Morrison | 10,810 | 31.9 | ▲6.3 |
| Total votes | | 33,916 | 100.0 | |

2001 New Jersey general election
| Party | Candidate | Votes | % |
|---|---|---|---|
| Republican | Robert E. Littell | 41,019 | 74.4 |
| Democratic | Edwin Selby | 14,117 | 25.6 |
| Total votes | | 55,136 | 100.0 |

1997 New Jersey general election
| Party | Candidate | Votes | % | ±% |
|---|---|---|---|---|
| Republican | Robert E. Littell | 44,342 | 73.0 | ▼10.3 |
| Democratic | John G. Wingler | 13,551 | 22.3 | N/A |
| Conservative | Ron Pondiscio | 2,868 | 4.7 | N/A |
| Total votes | | 60,761 | 100.0 | |

1993 New Jersey general election
| Party | Candidate | Votes | % | ±% |
|---|---|---|---|---|
| Republican | Robert E. Littell | 47,382 | 83.3 | ▲8.5 |
| Libertarian | William J. Dundas | 9,502 | 16.7 | N/A |
| Total votes | | 56,884 | 100.0 | |

1991 New Jersey general election
| Party | Candidate | Votes | % |
|---|---|---|---|
| Republican | Robert E. Littell | 31,432 | 74.8 |
| Democratic | Frederick J. Katz, Jr. | 7,216 | 17.2 |
| Middle Class Alternative | Gary “Buzz” Howell | 3,363 | 8.0 |
| Total votes | | 42,011 | 100.0 |

Special election, 1990
| Party | Candidate | Votes | % | ±% |
|---|---|---|---|---|
| Republican | Robert E. Littell | 28,480 | 54.6 | ▼45.4 |
| The People's Candidate | George T. Daggett | 13,734 | 26.3 | N/A |
| Democratic | Clarence W. Sickles | 9,963 | 19.1 | N/A |
| Total votes | | 52,177 | 100.0 | |

1987 New Jersey general election
| Party | Candidate | Votes | % | ±% |
|---|---|---|---|---|
| Republican | Wayne Dumont, Jr. | 34,617 | 100.0 | ▲24.4 |
| Total votes | | 34,617 | 100.0 | |

1983 New Jersey general election
| Party | Candidate | Votes | % | ±% |
|---|---|---|---|---|
| Republican | Wayne Dumont, Jr. | 29,279 | 75.6 | ▼1.8 |
| Democratic | Clarence W. Sickles | 9,431 | 24.4 | ▲1.8 |
| Total votes | | 38,710 | 100.0 | |

1981 New Jersey general election
| Party | Candidate | Votes | % |
|---|---|---|---|
| Republican | Wayne Dumont, Jr. | 37,467 | 77.4 |
| Democratic | Edward Gaffney | 10,953 | 22.6 |
| Total votes | | 48,420 | 100.0 |

1977 New Jersey general election
| Party | Candidate | Votes | % | ±% |
|---|---|---|---|---|
| Republican | James P. Vreeland | 34,694 | 67.1 | ▲14.5 |
| Democratic | Norma K. Herzfeld | 17,036 | 32.9 | ▼14.5 |
| Total votes | | 51,730 | 100.0 | |

1973 New Jersey general election
| Party | Candidate | Votes | % |
|---|---|---|---|
| Republican | James P. Vreeland, Jr. | 26,004 | 52.6 |
| Democratic | John C. Keefe | 23,417 | 47.4 |
| Total votes | | 49,421 | 100.0 |

=== General Assembly ===
2021 New Jersey general election
| Party | Candidate | Votes | % | ±% |
|---|---|---|---|---|
| Republican | F. Parker Space | 51,198 | 35.6 | ▲1.0 |
| Republican | Hal Wirths | 46,966 | 32.7 | ▼0.3 |
| Democratic | Georgianna Carol Cook | 23,436 | 16.3 | ▼0.7 |
| Democratic | Scott P. Fadden | 22,224 | 15.5 | ▲0.1 |
| Total votes | | 143,824 | 100.0 | |

2019 New Jersey general election
| Party | Candidate | Votes | % | ±% |
|---|---|---|---|---|
| Republican | F. Parker Space | 30,867 | 34.6 | ▲3.9 |
| Republican | Hal Wirths | 29,424 | 33.0 | ▲5.1 |
| Democratic | Deana Lykins | 15,113 | 17.0 | ▼3.3 |
| Democratic | Dan Soloman Smith | 13,684 | 15.4 | ▼2.9 |
| Total votes | | 89,088 | 100.0 | |

New Jersey general election, 2017
| Party | Candidate | Votes | % | ±% |
|---|---|---|---|---|
| Republican | F. Parker Space | 33,873 | 30.7 | ▼4.3 |
| Republican | Hal Wirths | 30,820 | 27.9 | ▼5.4 |
| Democratic | Kate Matteson | 22,456 | 20.3 | ▲6.4 |
| Democratic | Gina Trish | 20,200 | 18.3 | ▲4.8 |
| Green | Aaron Hyndman | 1,568 | 1.4 | N/A |
| Green | Kenny Collins | 1,518 | 1.4 | ▼2.9 |
| Total votes | | 110,435 | 100.0 | |

New Jersey general election, 2015
| Party | Candidate | Votes | % | ±% |
|---|---|---|---|---|
| Republican | F. Parker Space | 18,058 | 35.0 | ▲1.2 |
| Republican | Gail Phoebus | 17,217 | 33.3 | ▼2.7 |
| Democratic | Jacqueline Stapel | 7,165 | 13.9 | ▼2.4 |
| Democratic | Michael F. Grace | 6,998 | 13.5 | ▼0.4 |
| Green | Kenneth Collins | 2,227 | 4.3 | N/A |
| Total votes | | 51,665 | 100.0 | |

New Jersey general election, 2013
| Party | Candidate | Votes | % | ±% |
|---|---|---|---|---|
| Republican | Alison Littell McHose | 37,399 | 36.0 | ▲5.4 |
| Republican | F. Parker Space | 35,093 | 33.8 | ▲4.0 |
| Democratic | Susan M. Williams | 16,883 | 16.3 | ▼0.2 |
| Democratic | William (Bill) Weightman | 14,411 | 13.9 | ▼1.9 |
| Total votes | | 103,786 | 100.0 | |

New Jersey general election, 2011
| Party | Candidate | Votes | % |
|---|---|---|---|
| Republican | Alison Littell McHose | 19,026 | 30.6 |
| Republican | Gary R. Chiusano | 18,561 | 29.8 |
| Democratic | Leslie Huhn | 10,290 | 16.5 |
| Democratic | Jim Nye | 9,832 | 15.8 |
| Tea Party Proud | Rose Ann Salanitri | 3,161 | 5.1 |
| Principle Not Party | Mark D. Quick | 1,382 | 2.2 |
| Total votes | | 62,252 | 100.0 |

New Jersey general election, 2009
| Party | Candidate | Votes | % | ±% |
|---|---|---|---|---|
| Republican | Alison Littell McHose | 50,973 | 43.8 | ▲9.0 |
| Republican | Gary R. Chiusano | 47,741 | 41.0 | ▲7.2 |
| Democratic | Frederick J. Katz, Jr. | 17,781 | 15.3 | ▼0.5 |
| Total votes | | 116,495 | 100.0 | |

New Jersey general election, 2007
| Party | Candidate | Votes | % | ±% |
|---|---|---|---|---|
| Republican | Alison Littell McHose | 30,453 | 34.8 | ▲1.2 |
| Republican | Gary R. Chiusano | 29,616 | 33.8 | ▲0.8 |
| Democratic | Pat Walsh | 13,845 | 15.8 | ▼1.0 |
| Democratic | Toni Zimmer | 13,644 | 15.6 | ▼0.9 |
| Total votes | | 87,558 | 100.0 | |

New Jersey general election, 2005
| Party | Candidate | Votes | % | ±% |
|---|---|---|---|---|
| Republican | Alison Littell McHose | 37,318 | 33.6 | ▼5.4 |
| Republican | Guy R. Gregg | 36,615 | 33.0 | ▼8.3 |
| Democratic | Brian S. Murphy | 18,643 | 16.8 | N/A |
| Democratic | Thomas B. Boyle | 18,328 | 16.5 | ▼3.2 |
| Total votes | | 110,904 | 100.0 | |

New Jersey general election, 2003
| Party | Candidate | Votes | % | ±% |
|---|---|---|---|---|
| Republican | Guy R. Gregg | 24,472 | 41.3 | ▲7.1 |
| Republican | Alison Littell McHose | 23,103 | 39.0 | ▲2.7 |
| Democratic | Thomas B. Boyle | 11,658 | 19.7 | ▲4.8 |
| Total votes | | 59,233 | 100.0 | |

New Jersey general election, 2001
| Party | Candidate | Votes | % |
|---|---|---|---|
| Republican | Scott Garrett | 38,242 | 36.3 |
| Republican | Guy R. Gregg | 36,121 | 34.2 |
| Democratic | Suzanne Patnaude | 15,754 | 14.9 |
| Democratic | Margarita Cart | 15,369 | 14.6 |
| Total votes | | 105,486 | 100.0 |

New Jersey general election, 1999
| Party | Candidate | Votes | % | ±% |
|---|---|---|---|---|
| Republican | E. Scott Garrett | 22,444 | 42.3 | ▲2.6 |
| Republican | Guy R. Gregg | 21,479 | 40.5 | ▲3.4 |
| Democratic | Edwin C. Selby | 9,119 | 17.2 | ▲3.5 |
| Total votes | | 53,042 | 100.0 | |

New Jersey general election, 1997
| Party | Candidate | Votes | % | ±% |
|---|---|---|---|---|
| Republican | E. Scott Garrett | 43,066 | 39.7 | ▲3.1 |
| Republican | Guy R. Gregg | 40,170 | 37.1 | ▲1.4 |
| Democratic | Frederick J. Katz, Jr. | 14,878 | 13.7 | ▼2.0 |
| Conservative | Marilyn McCann | 4,015 | 3.7 | ▼3.7 |
| Libertarian | Jeffrey Polachek | 3,654 | 3.4 | N/A |
| Conservative | Ed De Mott | 2,622 | 2.4 | ▼2.3 |
| Total votes | | 108,405 | 100.0 | |

New Jersey general election, 1995
| Party | Candidate | Votes | % | ±% |
|---|---|---|---|---|
| Republican | E. Scott Garrett | 21,721 | 36.6 | ▼6.8 |
| Republican | Guy R. Gregg | 21,154 | 35.7 | ▼6.6 |
| Democratic | Edwin C. Selby | 9,290 | 15.7 | ▲1.5 |
| Conservative | Bernadine Silver | 4,364 | 7.4 | N/A |
| Conservative | Ronald C. Pondiscio | 2,803 | 4.7 | N/A |
| Total votes | | 59,332 | 100.0 | |

Special election, November 8, 1994
| Party | Candidate | Votes | % |
|---|---|---|---|
| Republican | Guy R. Gregg | 34,632 | 66.0 |
| Democratic | Cooper H. Morris | 17,816 | 34.0 |
| Total votes | | 52,448 | 100.0 |

New Jersey general election, 1993
| Party | Candidate | Votes | % | ±% |
|---|---|---|---|---|
| Republican | E. Scott Garrett | 46,673 | 43.4 | ▲3.8 |
| Republican | Dick Kamin | 45,491 | 42.3 | ▲3.0 |
| Democratic | William Weightman | 15,310 | 14.2 | ▼2.5 |
| Total votes | | 107,474 | 100.0 | |

1991 New Jersey general election
| Party | Candidate | Votes | % |
|---|---|---|---|
| Republican | E. Scott Garrett | 31,174 | 39.6 |
| Republican | Dick Kamin | 30,944 | 39.3 |
| Democratic | Michael J. Larose | 13,106 | 16.7 |
| Populist | Stuart Bacha | 1,957 | 2.5 |
| Populist | Compton C. Pakenham | 1,523 | 1.9 |
| Total votes | | 78,704 | 100.0 |

1989 New Jersey general election
| Party | Candidate | Votes | % | ±% |
|---|---|---|---|---|
| Republican | Robert E. Littell | 35,117 | 33.4 | ▼1.5 |
| Republican | Garabed “Chuck” Haytaian | 34,579 | 32.9 | ▼2.9 |
| Democratic | Timothy P. McCabe | 15,301 | 14.5 | ▲0.3 |
| Democratic | Robert T. Davis | 13,585 | 12.9 | ▼2.1 |
| Reduce Insurance Rates | Frederick P. Cook | 6,660 | 6.3 | N/A |
| Total votes | | 105,242 | 100.0 | |

1987 New Jersey general election
| Party | Candidate | Votes | % | ±% |
|---|---|---|---|---|
| Republican | Garabed “Chuck” Haytaian | 26,586 | 35.8 | ▲0.4 |
| Republican | Robert E. Littell | 25,942 | 34.9 | ▼2.4 |
| Democratic | Robert T. Davis | 11,154 | 15.0 | ▼0.6 |
| Democratic | Edwin C. Selby | 10,545 | 14.2 | ▲2.5 |
| Total votes | | 74,227 | 100.0 | |

1985 New Jersey general election
| Party | Candidate | Votes | % | ±% |
|---|---|---|---|---|
| Republican | Robert E. Littell | 30,616 | 37.3 | ▲1.3 |
| Republican | Garabed “Chuck” Haytaian | 29,094 | 35.4 | ▲0.7 |
| Democratic | Robert T. Davis | 12,806 | 15.6 | ▲0.4 |
| Democratic | John P. Kilroy, Jr. | 9,617 | 11.7 | ▼2.3 |
| Total votes | | 82,133 | 100.0 | |

New Jersey general election, 1983
| Party | Candidate | Votes | % | ±% |
|---|---|---|---|---|
| Republican | Robert E. Littell | 26,160 | 36.0 | ▲0.6 |
| Republican | Garabed “Chuck” Haytaian | 25,217 | 34.7 | ▲1.9 |
| Democratic | Robert T. Davis | 11,041 | 15.2 | ▼1.9 |
| Democratic | Daniel A. Barton | 10,152 | 14.0 | ▼0.7 |
| Total votes | | 72,570 | 100.0 | |

New Jersey general election, 1981
| Party | Candidate | Votes | % |
|---|---|---|---|
| Republican | Robert E. Littell | 30,515 | 35.4 |
| Republican | Garabed “Chuck” Haytaian | 28,293 | 32.8 |
| Democratic | Joseph T. Daly | 14,779 | 17.1 |
| Democratic | David B. Bogert | 12,673 | 14.7 |
| Total votes | | 86,260 | 100.0 |

Special election, 1980
| Party | Candidate | Votes | % |
|---|---|---|---|
| Republican | Leanna Brown | 46,838 | 71.3 |
| Democratic | Laurence J. Cutler | 18,842 | 28.7 |
| Total votes | | 65,680 | 100.0 |

New Jersey general election, 1979
| Party | Candidate | Votes | % | ±% |
|---|---|---|---|---|
| Republican | Dean A. Gallo | 24,129 | 34.5 | ▲1.8 |
| Republican | Barbara A. Curran | 24,048 | 34.4 | ▲0.3 |
| Democratic | Clayton D. Brown | 11,423 | 16.4 | ▼1.1 |
| Democratic | Kevin E. Renahan | 10,244 | 14.7 | ▼1.0 |
| Total votes | | 69,844 | 100.0 | |

New Jersey general election, 1977
| Party | Candidate | Votes | % | ±% |
|---|---|---|---|---|
| Republican | Barbara A. Curran | 34,696 | 34.1 | ▲4.8 |
| Republican | Dean A. Gallo | 33,306 | 32.7 | ▲5.5 |
| Democratic | John J. Sinsimer, Jr. | 17,801 | 17.5 | ▼2.9 |
| Democratic | Robert C. Kadri | 15,960 | 15.7 | ▼4.4 |
| Total votes | | 101,763 | 100.0 | |

New Jersey general election, 1975
| Party | Candidate | Votes | % | ±% |
|---|---|---|---|---|
| Republican | Barbara A. Curran | 28,343 | 29.3 | ▲4.1 |
| Republican | Dean A. Gallo | 26,277 | 27.2 | ▲2.6 |
| Democratic | John J. Sinsimer | 19,672 | 20.4 | ▼4.9 |
| Democratic | Paul N. Bontempo | 19,383 | 20.1 | ▼4.9 |
| No Income Tax | Dale E. Webb | 2,926 | 3.0 | N/A |
| Total votes | | 96,601 | 100.0 | |

New Jersey general election, 1973
| Party | Candidate | Votes | % |
|---|---|---|---|
| Democratic | John J. Sinsimer | 24,917 | 25.3 |
| Republican | Barbara A. Curran | 24,847 | 25.2 |
| Democratic | Charles M. Kennedy, Jr. | 24,644 | 25.0 |
| Republican | Ralph J. Ferrara | 24,245 | 24.6 |
| Total votes | | 98,653 | 100.0 |
