= Virginia Littell =

American politician (born 1943)

Chairman of the New Jersey Republican State Committee
- In office 1992–1995
- Preceded by: Bob Franks
- Succeeded by: Chuck Haytaian

Personal details
- Born: Virginia Marie Regina Newman; December 8, 1943 (age 82)
- Spouse: Robert Littell

Virginia Marie Regina "Ginny" Newman Littell (born December 8, 1943) is an American Republican Party politician who served as the chairman of the New Jersey Republican State Committee from 1992 until 1995. Her husband Robert Littell served in the New Jersey Legislature for nearly 40 years, and her daughter Alison Littell McHose was a member of the New Jersey General Assembly from 2003 to 2015.

Virginia Newman was born on December 8, 1943 and was raised in Scituate, Massachusetts. She married Robert Littell on November 28, 1964, and they settled in Newton, New Jersey. They had two children, Alison Elizabeth Littell (born May 24, 1965) and Luke Alfred Littell (born January 26, 1974).

While her husband pursued a legislative career, elected to the New Jersey General Assembly in 1968, Virginia Littell became active in the local Republican Party organization, running for the Sussex County Republican Committee. She continued to work at Littell's TV and Appliances, the family business in Sparta, New Jersey, while becoming more involved in party politics. She was selected as a member of the New Jersey Republican State Committee, eventually becoming party treasurer. In October 1992 the State Committee chose her to replace Bob Franks as chairman after Franks resigned to run for a seat in the House of Representatives.

Littell's tenure ended in June 1995 when Governor Christine Todd Whitman made it known that Chuck Haytaian was her choice for chairman of the State Committee. Rather than face a contentious fight for the post, Littell stepped down, allowing Haytaian to run unchallenged.

Littell has since worked as a business consultant, partnering in the firm of Brazer & Littell with Georgene Brazer, Republican municipal chairwoman of Tewksbury Township, New Jersey. In 2002, Intrawest Corporation, a client of Brazer & Littell, worked out a deal with the state of New Jersey to preserve land on Hamburg Mountain in Vernon Township, New Jersey near the Intrawest ski resort of Mountain Creek. The deal was brokered by Robert Littell, then chairman of the Senate Budget Committee, but the Littells denied any conflict of interest in the arrangement.

Party political offices
Preceded by Bob Franks	Chairman of the New Jersey Republican State Committee; 1992 – 1995	Succeeded by Chuck Haytaian
