= Alison Littell McHose =

American politician

Member of the New Jersey General Assembly from the 24th District
- In office February 4, 2003 – October 17, 2015
- Preceded by: Scott Garrett
- Succeeded by: Gail Phoebus

Personal details
- Born: Alison Elizabeth Littell; May 24, 1965 (age 61) Newton, New Jersey, U.S.
- Party: Republican
- Spouse: Morgan McHose (m. 1993)
- Children: 3
- Parent(s): Robert E. Littell; Virginia Littell
- Education: University of Maryland, College Park (BS)

Alison Elizabeth Littell McHose (born May 24, 1965) is an American Republican Party politician, who served in the New Jersey General Assembly from 2003 to 2015, where she represented the 24th Legislative District.

== Early life and education ==
McHose was born on May 24, 1965, in Newton to Robert Littell and Virginia Littell. At the time, her father was a Franklin borough councilman and later became an Assemblyman and State Senator while her mother was a business consultant and later chair of the New Jersey Republican State Committee. Her grandfather Alfred B. Littell represented Sussex County in both houses of the Legislature and served as Senate President in 1951. She graduated from Pope John XXIII Regional High School.

McHose attended Simmons College in Boston and graduated with a B.S. in Government and Politics from the University of Maryland, College Park.

== Career ==
Following her graduation from college, McHose served in the George H. W. Bush administration, from 1988 until 1992, where she worked at the National Endowment for the Humanities under Chairwoman Lynne V. Cheney and in the Department of the Treasury under Nicholas F. Brady. At the Republican National Convention in 2008, McHose served as a national delegate from New Jersey.

=== New Jersey Assembly ===
McHose was selected on January 25, 2003, by the Republican county committee members from Sussex, Morris and Hunterdon Counties to fill the remainder of Scott Garrett's term in the General Assembly after he was elected to the United States House of Representatives, and was sworn into office on February 4, 2003. McHose is the first woman to serve the 24th District and is the first sitting legislator to give birth while in office. She is also part of the first father-daughter team to serve simultaneously in the New Jersey Legislature, together with her father who was serving in the Senate from the 24th district at the time. McHose serves in the Assembly on the Assembly Appropriations Committee, the Consumer Affairs Committee, and the Legislative Services Commission. McHose has served as the Deputy Republican Whip from 2012 to 2013, Republican Deputy Conference Leader of the Assembly from 2008 to 2009, Assistant Minority Leader from 2006 to 2008, and was the Assistant Republican Whip from 2004 to 2006.

=== Later career ===
McHose served for 12 years in the NJ General Assembly, and in 2015, she was appointed and sworn in as the Administrator of Franklin Borough in Sussex County. She was the fourth generation of her family to serve the Borough. Her great-grandfather Watson Littell, was a member of the first Borough Council in 1913; her grandfather Alfred B. Littell was Mayor in the 1950s and her father Robert E. Littell, served on the Borough Council in the 1960s. McHose retired from state government in 2020.

== Personal life ==
McHose has been married to Morgan Arthur McHose since July 1993. They reside in Tucson, Arizona, with their three children.

New Jersey General Assembly
Preceded by Scott Garrett	Member of the New Jersey General Assembly for the 24th District; February 4, 2003 – October 17, 2015; With: Guy R. Gregg, Gary R. Chiusano, Parker Space	Succeeded by Gail Phoebus
