= Robert E. Littell =

American politician

Robert Littell

Acting President of the New Jersey Senate
- In office January 8, 2002 (<10 minutes)
- Preceded by: Donald DiFrancesco
- Succeeded by: John O. Bennett

Member of the New Jersey Senate from the 24th district
- In office September 24, 1990 – January 8, 2008
- Preceded by: Wayne Dumont
- Succeeded by: Steve Oroho

Member of the New Jersey General Assembly
- In office January 9, 1968 – September 24, 1990 Serving with Robert C. Shelton Jr., Donald J. Albanese and Chuck Haytaian
- Preceded by: District created
- Succeeded by: Scott Garrett
- Constituency: 15th District (1968–1982); 24th District (1982–1990)

Personal details
- Born: Robert Eugene Littell; January 9, 1936 Orange, New Jersey, U.S.
- Died: November 14, 2014 (aged 78) Franklin, New Jersey, U.S.
- Party: Republican
- Spouse: Virginia Littell
- Children: Alison Littell McHose
- Parent: Alfred B. Littell (father)

Robert Eugene Littell (January 9, 1936 – November 14, 2014) was an American Republican Party politician who served as a member of the New Jersey Senate from 1990 to 2008. He represented the 15th Legislative District until 1982 and the 24th Legislative District thereafter. Before entering the Senate he served in the New Jersey General Assembly from 1968 to 1990 and the Franklin Borough Council from 1963 to 1965. He was a Delegate to the 1976 Republican National Convention.

After nearly 40 years in the New Jersey Legislature — making him at the time the longest-serving legislator in state history (service length since surpassed by Richard Codey) — Littell announced on March 6, 2007, that he would not seek reelection as senator and would retire from office at the end of 2007. Freeholder Steve Oroho and Assemblyman Guy R. Gregg both announced that they would pursue the Republican nomination for Littell's Senate seat in the June 2007 primary. Oroho defeated Gregg in the primary and went on to win the seat in the general election.

== Biography ==
Littell was born in 1936 in Orange, the son of State Senator Alfred B. Littell and his wife, the former Dorothy A. Kershner. He attended Franklin High School and the Hun School of Princeton. During the Korean War he served three years with the United States Marine Corps and received an honorable discharge in 1956. Senator Littell is part of the first father-daughter team to serve simultaneously in the New Jersey Legislature, together with his daughter, Assemblywoman Alison Littell McHose. His wife, Virginia Littell, has served as chairman of the New Jersey Republican State Committee. From 1992 to 2003, Senator Littell served as the Senate Budget and Appropriations Chair, and since 2004 he has served as the Senate Budget Officer. He was a member of the Budget and Appropriations Committee, the Labor Committee, the Legislative Services Commission, and the Intergovernmental Relations Commission.

On January 8, 2002, Littell was elected acting president of the New Jersey Senate and momentarily presided over the Senate until John O. Bennett and Richard Codey had been duly elected as co-presidents. At the time, the president of the senate acted as governor in the event of a vacancy in that office, leading political journalist David Wildstein to speculate that Littell "maybe" assumed the governorship for "a few minutes" as well, until Bennett took the role. However, Littell is not included on a list of governors of the state published by the National Governors Association.

Littell said he was guided by the principle expressed in the 1850s quotation, "There is no right way, to do the wrong thing." In 1996, the Senator was awarded an honorary Doctor of Laws Degree by Centenary College of New Jersey and in September of the same year, he was appointed to Centenary's board of trustees. In 2001, Littell was awarded an honorary Doctor of Humane Letters from the New Jersey Institute of Technology. He died in Franklin, New Jersey on November 14, 2014. He was 78 years old.

New Jersey General Assembly
Preceded by District created	Member of the New Jersey General Assembly from the 15th district January 9, 1968–January 12, 1982	Succeeded by John S. Watson
Preceded by Dean Gallo	Member of the New Jersey General Assembly from the 24th district January 12, 1982–September 24, 1990	Succeeded by Scott Garrett
New Jersey Senate
Preceded by Wayne Dumont	Member of the New Jersey Senate from the 24th district September 24, 1990–January 8, 2008	Succeeded by Steve Oroho
Preceded by Donald DiFrancesco	Acting President of the New Jersey Senate; January 8, 2002 (<10 minutes)	Succeeded by John O. Bennett
