= Ross F. Littell =

American textile and furniture designer

Ross F. Littell (July 14, 1924 – April 17, 2000) was an American textile and furniture designer known for his practical, innovative, and minimalist style as part of the Good Design movement of the 1950s. His three-legged T-chair, designed in 1952 with William Katavolos and Douglas Kelley, is part of the permanent collections of the Metropolitan Museum of Art and the Museum of Modern Art in New York, along with the Art Institute of Chicago.

== Early life and education ==
Littell was born and raised in Los Angeles, California. After high school, he won a four-year scholarship to the Art Center School in Los Angeles (currently the Art Center College of Design in Pasadena), but his education was interrupted in 1943 for military service in the Coast Guard. He resumed his studies at the Pratt Institute in New York, where he graduated with honors and a dual major in graphics and industrial design. In 1957, Littell was awarded a Fulbright fellowship for a year's study in Italy. During this period, he became increasingly fascinated with texture, pattern and structure, and he photographed many examples which were later exhibited in Rome.

== Partnership with Katavolos and Kelley ==
Littell met William Katavolos and Douglas Kelley while attending Pratt Institute, and the three designers formed a partnership in 1949. During their six-year partnership, they designed furniture, along with textiles and dinnerware, for Laverne Originals in New York, using materials such as leather, glass, chrome, and marble. Littell, Katavolos, and Kelley exhibited a group of chairs and tables at the Museum of Modern Art’s "Good Design" shows in 1953 and 1955. In 1952, their T-chair won the American Institute of Decorators (see American Society of Interior Designers) award for the best furniture design in the United States.

== Later work ==
In 1956, Littell opened his own studio and began to work as a freelance designer. Much of his work during this time period was for the companies Knoll, Inc. and Herman Miller. Littell's 1959 textile design "Criss-Cross" for Knoll received a citation of merit from the American Institute of Decorators. In 1960, he moved to Copenhagen and later to Italy, where he worked for European manufacturers such Unika Vaev and DePadova. During this time, Littell focused on developing mathematics-based textiles, along with metal wall hangings that he called "luminars." He moved back to California in 1995, where he died five years later in Santa Barbara.

== Exhibitions ==
=== Solo exhibitions ===
- 1993 OK Harris Gallery, New York City
  - Exhibition showing principally intarsia veneer reliefs comprising elements of geometry with illusive, shimmering overtones which constantly change depending on viewing angle.
- 1983 The Royal Copenhagen Porcelain Factory, Copenhagen
  - White on white bas-reliefs on paper
- 1982 Illums Bolighus, Copenhagen
  - White on white hand pressed bas-reliefs on paper
- 1969 Herman Miller Showroom, New York City
  - Exhibition of "Luminars" shown for the first time in the USA
- 1968 CitiBank, Milan
  - Exhibition of ten "Luminars"

=== Group exhibitions ===
- 1993 Villa Olmo, Como, Italy
  - Scheduled for the invitational International Mini-Textile Art Exhibit No. 3, May 1993. Requirements: miniature piece 8 x 8 x 8” utilizing textile, fiber, or paper.
- 1992 "Art Encounter," Vittorio Veneto, Italy
  - An international exhibition featuring artists and craftsmen from five countries scheduled to travel to Finland, Germany and the Netherlands. Work by Littell included illusion reliefs pressed into cardboard as well as a set of wooden boxes with multi-directionally polished aluminum tops.
- 1982 Aeroskobing Town Hall, Aero, Denmark
  - An exhibition shared with a ceramicist; Littell's work included three large "Luminars"
- 1980 Founded "Totem," comprising a group of five artists exhibiting together in galleries and art clubs around Denmark. Work by Littell included "Luminars" and hand pressed bas-reliefs.
- 1968 Oscar Woolens, London
  - "Luminars" and design selections.
- 1965 Eriksholm Mansion, Helsingor, Denmark
  - Exhibitions of art pieces including the first "Luminars."
- 1958 Rome Gallery
  - Spring exhibition of work by Fulbright scholars which included Littell's photographs of impressions of Italy
