= Michael H. Herson =

American lobbyist, consultant

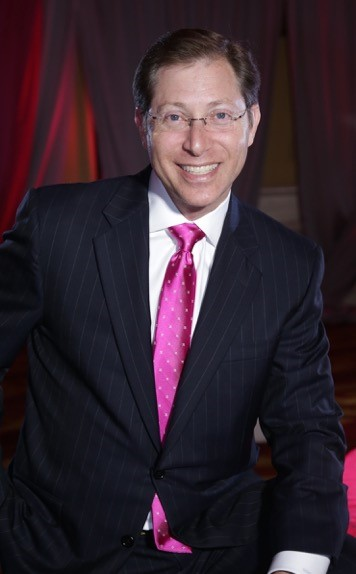
- Education: Georgetown University, BA; Rutgers University, JD; Georgetown University, MA
- Occupations: Lobbyist, Businessman
- Spouse: Vicki Siegel Herson
- Website: michaelherson.com

Michael H. Herson is an American lobbyist and consultant for the United States defense industry, and serves as the president and chief executive officer of American Defense International (ADI). He was awarded the Secretary of Defense Medal for Outstanding Public Service in 1993.

== Early life and education ==
Herson, whose father was a World War II veteran, grew up in New Jersey. He began working at age 11. Herson painted poles, packed candy at warehouses, picked up garbage at drive-in movie theaters, and worked at a fried chicken restaurant. Herson attended Georgetown University, where he earned his B.A. and master's degree in national security studies. Herson also holds a Juris Doctor from Rutgers University School of Law.

== Career ==
While studying at Georgetown University, Herson served as an intern for Representative Jim Courter. He was then chosen as a White House intern during the Reagan administration. During his internship, Herson worked in the executive office of the President, and spent time in other offices including the National Security Council, the Office of Public Liaison, and the Office of the First Lady. Herson then joined the speech writing office of Vice President George H. W. Bush as an intern. He worked on state and federal campaigns while attending law school in New Jersey. Herson was later appointed as Special Assistant to the Assistant Secretary of Defense for Force Management and Personnel, the Pentagon's senior manpower official responsible for all personnel policy and oversight of the recruiting, training, compensation, support, and management of the department's military and civilian personnel.

After leaving the Department of Defense, Herson became a visiting fellow for national-security affairs at the Alexis de Tocqueville Institution and was part of a team that represented the Great Lakes Naval Training Center before the Base Closure Commission.

Herson returned to New Jersey when the county chairman contacted him about running for the United States Congress. Herson, who was working for a healthcare company at the time, won the Republican primary, but the campaign was lost to incumbent Frank Pallone Jr.

In 1995, Herson joined the defense lobbying firm American Defense International (ADI) and became president and CEO of the firm. ADI has worked with clients such as Northrop Grumman, Raytheon, General Dynamics and United Technologies Corporation. As of 2015, ADI had 70 client bases in eight countries.

Herson has been included on The Hill's list of Top Lobbyists from 2010 through 2019.

== Other activities ==
Herson is on the board of Surprise Lake Camp, and has his own wine label, Herson Family Vineyards. Herson also serves on the Consensus for American Security, a program of the American Security Project, and on the advisory board of The Bronx Freedom Fund.
