= Dean Gallo =

American politician (1935–1994)

Dean Anderson Gallo
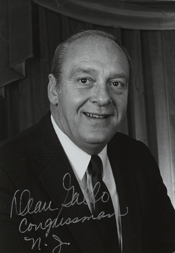

Member of the U.S. House of Representatives from New Jersey's 11th district
- In office January 3, 1985 – November 6, 1994
- Preceded by: Joseph Minish
- Succeeded by: Rodney Frelinghuysen

Member of the New Jersey General Assembly
- In office January 13, 1976 – January 3, 1985 Serving with Barbara A. Curran, Leanna Brown and Ralph A. Loveys
- Preceded by: John J. Sinsimer
- Succeeded by: Robert J. Martin
- Constituency: 24th District (1976–1982); 26th District (1982–1985)

Minority Leader of the New Jersey General Assembly
- In office January 1982 – January 1984
- Preceded by: James R. Hurley
- Succeeded by: Chuck Hardwick

Personal details
- Born: November 23, 1935 Hackensack, New Jersey, U.S.
- Died: November 6, 1994 (aged 58) Denville Township, New Jersey, U.S.
- Party: Republican
- Spouse(s): Anne Schwenker Gallo (divorced); Betty Gallo
- Children: 2
- Occupation: Realtor

Dean Anderson Gallo (November 23, 1935 – November 6, 1994) was an American politician and businessman who served as a member of the United States House of Representatives, representing New Jersey's 11th congressional district from 1985 until his death from prostate cancer in Denville Township, New Jersey, in 1994.

== Early life ==
Gallo was born in Hackensack, New Jersey, the son of Dean and Selma Gallo. He grew up in Boonton, New Jersey, and attended public schools in Parsippany–Troy Hills, before graduating from Boonton High School in 1954.

== Career ==
He spent his career as a realtor and real estate developer, and was an owner of Gallo & DeCroce, a firm he started with another future elected official, Alex DeCroce.

=== Local politics ===
Gallo was elected to the Parsippany-Troy Hills Township Council in 1967, and served as council president from 1968 to 1971. He was elected to the Morris County Board of Freeholders in 1971 to fill an unexpired term, and elected to a full three-year term in 1972. He was the freeholder director from 1973 to 1975. In 1974, Gallo considered running for New Jersey's 5th congressional district, which included all of Somerset and parts of Essex, Mercer and Morris counties, including his hometown of Parsippany. The Republican incumbent, Peter Frelinghuysen, was retiring after 22 years. However, Gallo ultimately did not run and instead endorsed Assembly Minority Leader Thomas Kean, who narrowly lost the GOP primary to Millicent Fenwick.

=== New Jersey Assembly ===
In 1975, Gallo became a candidate for New Jersey's 24th legislative district, which included part of Morris County and Summit in Union County. Gallo won the Republican primary by a more than 2–1 margin against four other candidates, W. Thomas Tintle, Gerard R. Hughes, Jack Newberger and Raymond F. Bonnell. In the general election, he defeated two-term Democratic Assemblyman John J. Sinsimer by 6,605 votes, 26,277 to 19,672. Gallo faced Sinsimer again in 1977 and won by an even greater margin, 15,505 votes, 33,306 to 17,801. He was re-elected by similar margins in 1979, 1981, and 1983. Gallo was elected Assembly Minority Leader in 1981 and was re-elected to a second term in 1983.

=== U.S. House of Representatives ===
New Jersey's congressional map drawn after the 1980 United States census was thrown out in 1984 on the grounds that the variations in district populations were too large. A panel of federal judges substituted a new map that significantly altered the 11th District, home to 11-term Democratic incumbent Joseph Minish. Democratic-tilting towns in Essex, Hudson, southern Bergen and Passaic counties were cut out. To make up for the loss in population, the district was pushed further west to include all of heavily Republican Morris County. It also absorbed several equally Republican areas in Sussex and Warren counties and retained the more Republican areas of Essex County. Gallo immediately entered the race; the redrawn 11th included his home in Parsippany. Minish was thought to face very difficult odds for reelection, but opted to run in the 11th after considering a run in another district.

Ultimately, Gallo defeated Minish by 27,624 votes, 133,662 (56%) to 106,038 (44%). He was undoubtedly helped by Ronald Reagan's landslide reelection bid that year. Gallo's campaign was managed by Assemblyman (and later Congressman) Bob Franks. He was easily re-elected in 1986, 1988, 1990 and 1992 in what became one of the most Republican districts in the Northeast. Gallo served on the House Appropriations Committee, and joined the House Republican leadership as a Deputy Minority Whip.

In 1994, Gallo faced a primary challenge from Dr. Joseph Pennacchio, a considerably more conservative Republican. Pennacchio spent over $200,000 of his own money attacking Gallo. Gallo won 26,492 (65.28%) to 10,917 (26.90%) in a four-candidate race.

== Personal life ==
Gallo had been treated for prostate cancer in 1992 and the cancer returned in 1994. He withdrew as a candidate for re-election on August 29, 1994, and died on November 6, 1994, at age 58. Assemblyman Rodney Frelinghuysen was named to replace Gallo on the ballot, and was elected two days after Gallo's death.

The Dean and Betty Gallo Prostate Cancer Center at the Cancer Institute of New Jersey is named in his honor.

== See also ==
- List of members of the United States Congress who died in office (1950–1999)

New Jersey General Assembly
Preceded by John J. Sinsimer	Member of the New Jersey General Assembly from the 24th district 1976–1982	Succeeded by Robert E. Littell
Preceded by Mildred Barry Garvin	Member of the New Jersey General Assembly from the 26th district 1982–1985	Succeeded by Robert Martin
U.S. House of Representatives
Preceded by Joseph Minish	Member of the U.S. House of Representatives from New Jersey's 11th congressional district 1985–1994	Succeeded by Rodney Frelinghuysen
