= 2012 United States Senate election in New Jersey =

- November 6, 2012
- Turnout: 67% (▲19pp)
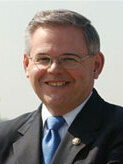

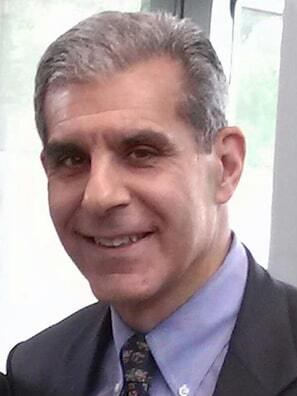
| Nominee | Bob Menendez | Joe Kyrillos |
| Party | Democratic | Republican |
| Popular vote | 1,987,680 | 1,329,534 |
| Percentage | 58.87% | 39.37% |
- Menendez: 40–50% 50–60% 60–70% 70–80% 80–90% >90% Kyrillos: 40–50% 50–60% 60–70% 70–80% >90%
U.S. senator before election
Bob Menendez
Democratic
Elected U.S. Senator
Bob Menendez
Democratic

The 2012 United States Senate election in New Jersey took place on November 6, 2012, concurrently with the 2012 U.S. presidential election, other elections to the United States Senate and House of Representatives, and various state and local elections.

Incumbent Senator Bob Menendez became the first Hispanic-American U.S. senator to represent New Jersey in January 2006 when former U.S. senator Jon Corzine appointed him to the seat, having resigned to become governor of New Jersey after winning in 2005. In 2006, Menendez defeated Republican State Senator Thomas Kean, Jr. with 53.3% of votes.

Menendez won re-election to a second full term, becoming the first Democratic Senate candidate to carry Somerset County since Bill Bradley in 1984. This is the only time since 1976 that a candidate for this seat received over 55% of the vote. This election marked the first time that someone won this seat by double digits since 1976 as well. Menendez outperformed President Obama's margin in the concurrent presidential race by 1.71%.

== Democratic primary ==
=== Candidates ===
- Bob Menendez, incumbent U.S. senator

=== Polling ===
| Poll source | Date(s) administered | Sample size | Margin of error | Bob Menendez | Someone else | Unsure |
|---|---|---|---|---|---|---|
| Fairleigh Dickinson University | March 5–11, 2012 | 404 | ±5.0% | 30% | 37% | 33% |

=== Results ===
Democratic primary results
| Party | Candidate | Votes | % |
|---|---|---|---|
| Democratic | Bob Menendez (incumbent) | 235,321 | 100 |
| Total votes | | 235,321 | 100 |

== Republican primary ==
=== Candidates ===
==== Declared ====
- David Brown, inventor
- Joe Kyrillos, state senator
- Bader Qarmout, businessman and adjunct professor at the County College of Morris
- Joseph Rudy Rullo, businessman

==== Withdrew ====
- Ian Linker, attorney
- Anna Little, former mayor of Highlands and candidate for NJ-06 in 2010

==== Declined ====
- Diane Allen, state senator, candidate for the U.S. Senate in 2002 and former news broadcaster
- Chris Christie, governor of New Jersey and former U.S. attorney
- John Crowley, biotechnology executive
- Michael Doherty, state senator
- Tim Smith, financial services firm executive and member of the Roxbury Township Council
- Jay Webber, state assemblyman and former New Jersey Republican State Committee chairman

=== Polling ===
| Poll source | Date(s) administered | Sample size | Margin of error | Michael Doherty | Kim Guadagno | Woody Johnson | Tom Kean Jr. | Joseph Kyrillos | Anna Little | Tim Smith | Other | Undecided |
|---|---|---|---|---|---|---|---|---|---|---|---|---|
| Public Policy Polling | July 15–18, 2011 | 300 | ±5.7% | 7% | 10% | 9% | 36% | 3% | 4% | 2% | — | 30% |

=== Results ===
Results by county: Kyrillos—80–90% Kyrillos—70–80% Kyrillos—60–70% Kyrillos—40–50%

Republican primary results
| Party | Candidate | Votes | % |
|---|---|---|---|
| Republican | Joe Kyrillos | 161,146 | 77.1 |
| Republican | David Brown | 18,671 | 8.9 |
| Republican | Joseph Rullo | 16,690 | 8.0 |
| Republican | Bader Qarmout | 12,637 | 6.0 |
| Total votes | | 209,144 | 100% |

== General election ==
=== Candidates ===
- Daryl Mikell Brooks (Reform Nation), activist
- Gwen Diakos (Jersey Strong Independents), civilian defense contractor
- J. David Dranikoff (totally independent candidate), businessman
- Kenneth R. Kaplan (Libertarian), commercial real estate broker
- Joe Kyrillos (Republican), state senator
- Eugene Martin LaVergne (independent)
- Bob Menendez (Democratic), incumbent U.S. senator
- Greg Pason (Socialist), national secretary of the Socialist Party USA and perennial candidate
- Inder "Andy" Soni (America First)
- Robert "Turk" Turkavage (Responsibility Fairness Integrity), former FBI agent
- Ken Wolski (Green), medical marijuana activist and former nurse

=== Debates ===
Three debates were scheduled. The first took place on October 4, 2012, at Montclair State University. Menendez and Kyrillos participated. The second took place on October 10 at NJ 101.5 studios in Trenton. The third was to take place on October 17 at Mercer County Community College.

External links

- Complete video of debate, October 4, 2012 - C-SPAN
- Complete video of debate, October 13, 2012 - C-SPAN

=== Fundraising ===
| Candidate (party) | Receipts | Disbursements | Cash on hand | Debt |
|---|---|---|---|---|
| Bob Menendez (D) | $10,243,864 | $2,325,178 | $10,345,365 | $0 |
| Joseph Kyrillos (R) | $3,106,536 | $1,132,232 | $1,974,302 | $50,236 |
| Kenneth R. Kaplan (L) | $800 | $0 | $800 | $0 |
Source: Federal Election Commission

==== Top contributors ====
| Bob Menendez | Contribution | Joseph Kyrillos | Contribution |
|---|---|---|---|
| Lowenstein Sandler | $116,160 | McElroy, Deutsch, Mulvaney & Carpenter, LLP | $133,098 |
| Greenberg Traurig | $78,250 | Allied Management Inc | $22,000 |
| NORPAC | $70,550 | Connell Foley | $18,250 |
| Prudential Financial | $66,800 | Maser Consulting | $17,250 |
| DeCotiis, FitzPatrick & Cole | $48,150 | B&L Tire | $15,000 |
| Kindred Healthcare | $48,000 | Berkeley College | $15,000 |
| Verizon Communications | $47,050 | CJ Hesse | $15,000 |
| Medco Health Solutions | $41,249 | GlobalTel | $15,000 |
| DLA Piper | $41,000 | Langer Transport Corp | $15,000 |
| Dade Medical College | $40,000 | Fgi Finance | $14,000 |

==== Top industries ====
| Bob Menendez | Contribution | Joe Kyrillos | Contribution |
|---|---|---|---|
| Lawyers/law firms | $1,633,843 | Lawyers/law firms | $312,845 |
| Real estate | $1,096,684 | Retired | $103,900 |
| Lobbyists | $578,182 | Financial institutions | $98,200 |
| Financial institutions | $532,651 | Real estate | $98,150 |
| Health professionals | $524,810 | Health professionals | $62,100 |
| Retired | $411,525 | Business services | $60,250 |
| Construction services | $388,550 | Construction services | $54,300 |
| Pharmaceuticals/health products | $353,250 | Universities | $51,250 |
| Insurance | $338,550 | General contractors | $39,500 |
| Leadership PACs | $328,244 | Misc. business | $38,550 |

=== Predictions ===
| Source | Ranking | As of |
|---|---|---|
| The Cook Political Report | Likely D | November 1, 2012 |
| Sabato's Crystal Ball | Likely D | November 5, 2012 |
| Rothenberg Political Report | Safe D | November 2, 2012 |
| Real Clear Politics | Likely D | November 5, 2012 |

=== Polling ===
| Poll source | Date(s) administered | Sample size | Margin of error | Bob Menendez (D) | Joseph Kyrillos (R) | Other | Undecided |
|---|---|---|---|---|---|---|---|
| Fairleigh Dickinson University | January 3–9, 2011 | 802 | ±3.5% | 41% | 29% | — | 30% |
| Public Policy Polling | July 15–18, 2011 | 480 | ±4.5% | 48% | 29% | — | 23% |
| Fairleigh Dickinson University | September 19–25, 2011 | 800 | ±3.5% | 49% | 28% | — | 22% |
| Fairleigh Dickinson University | January 2–8, 2012 | 800 | ±3.5% | 43% | 31% | — | 26% |
| Rutgers-Eagleton | February 9–11, 2012 | 914 | ±3.3% | 44% | 22% | 1% | 26% |
| Survey USA | February 24–26, 2012 | 533 | ±4.3% | 46% | 31% | — | 23% |
| Quinnipiac | February 21–27, 2012 | 1,396 | ±2.6% | 49% | 34% | 1% | 14% |
| Fairleigh Dickinson University | March 5–11, 2012 | 396 | ±2.6% | 43% | 33% | — | 23% |
| Quinnipiac | April 3–9, 2012 | 1,607 | ±2.4% | 44% | 35% | 1% | 20% |
| Fairleigh Dickinson/PublicMind | April 30 – May 6, 2012 | 400 | ±5% | 42% | 33% | — | 24% |
| Quinnipiac | May 9–14, 2012 | 1,582 | ±2.5% | 45% | 35% | 2% | 19% |
| Quinnipiac | July 9–14, 2012 | 1,623 | ±2.5% | 47% | 34% | 1% | 16% |
| Monmouth University | July 18–22, 2012 | 535 LV | ±2.5% | 44% | 35% | 1% | 19% |
| Monmouth University | July 23–27, 2012 | 849 RV | ±2.5% | 45% | 33% | 1% | 22% |
| Rutgers-Eagleton | August 23–25, 2012 | 688 LV | ±3.7% | 47% | 35% | 8% | 10% |
| Quinnipiac University | August 27 – September 2, 2012 | 1,471 LV | ±2.5% | 50% | 40% | — | 10% |
| Quinnipiac University | September 6–12, 2012 | 706 LV | ±2.5% | 50% | 36% | — | 16% |
| Philadelphia Inquirer | September 9–12, 2012 | 600 LV | ±2.5% | 43% | 32% | — | 12% |
| Monmouth University | September 19–23, 2012 | 613 LV | ±2.5% | 49% | 34% | — | 15% |
| Philadelphia Inquirer | October 4–8, 2012 | 604 LV | ±4% | 49% | 35% | — | 15% |
| Quinnipiac | October 10–14, 2012 | 1,319 LV | ±2.7% | 55% | 37% | — | 15% |
| Stockton | October 12–18, 2012 | 811 LV | ±3.5% | 52% | 30% | — | 18% |
| SurveyUSA | October 17–18, 2012 | 577 LV | ±4.2% | 53% | 33% | 5% | 9% |
| Philadelphia Inquirer | October 23–25, 2012 | 601 LV | ±4% | 50% | 32% | — | 18% |

Hypothetical polling

| Poll source | Date(s) administered | Sample size | Margin of error | Bob Menendez (D) | Jennifer Beck (R) | Other | Undecided |
|---|---|---|---|---|---|---|---|
| Fairleigh Dickinson University | January 3–9, 2011 | 802 | ±3.5% | 42% | 29% | — | 29% |

| Poll source | Date(s) administered | Sample size | Margin of error | Bob Menendez (D) | Lou Dobbs (R) | Other | Undecided |
|---|---|---|---|---|---|---|---|
| Public Policy Polling | January 6–9, 2011 | 520 | ±4.3% | 47% | 35% | — | 18% |

| Poll source | Date(s) administered | Sample size | Margin of error | Bob Menendez (D) | Lou Dobbs (I) | Other | Undecided |
|---|---|---|---|---|---|---|---|
| Fairleigh Dickinson University | January 4–10, 2010 | 801 | ±3.5% | 37% | 34% | — | 28% |

| Poll source | Date(s) administered | Sample size | Margin of error | Bob Menendez (D) | Michael Doherty (R) | Other | Undecided |
|---|---|---|---|---|---|---|---|
| Fairleigh Dickinson University | February 23 – March 1, 2010 | 801 | ±3.5% | 40% | 27% | 8% | 25% |
| Fairleigh Dickinson University | January 3–9, 2011 | 802 | ±3.5% | 40% | 30% | — | 30% |
| Public Policy Polling | July 15–18, 2011 | 480 | ±4.5% | 48% | 35% | — | 17% |
| Fairleigh Dickinson University | September 19–25, 2011 | 800 | ±3.5% | 49% | 30% | — | 22% |

| Poll source | Date(s) administered | Sample size | Margin of error | Bob Menendez (D) | Kim Guadagno (R) | Other | Undecided |
|---|---|---|---|---|---|---|---|
| Fairleigh Dickinson University | January 3–9, 2011 | 802 | ±3.5% | 47% | 26% | — | 27% |
| Public Policy Polling | January 6–9, 2011 | 520 | ±4.3% | 45% | 30% | — | 24% |
| Public Policy Polling | July 15–18, 2011 | 480 | ±4.5% | 48% | 34% | — | 18% |

| Poll source | Date(s) administered | Sample size | Margin of error | Bob Menendez (D) | Woody Johnson (R) | Other | Undecided |
|---|---|---|---|---|---|---|---|
| Public Policy Polling | July 15–18, 2011 | 480 | ±4.5% | 48% | 30% | — | 22% |

| Poll source | Date(s) administered | Sample size | Margin of error | Bob Menendez (D) | Tom Kean Jr. (R) | Other | Undecided |
|---|---|---|---|---|---|---|---|
| Fairleigh Dickinson University | January 23 – February 1, 2010 | 801 | ±3.5% | 35% | 45% | 2% | 15% |
| Fairleigh Dickinson University | February 23 – March 1, 2010 | 801 | ±3.5% | 38% | 39% | 6% | 17% |
| Fairleigh Dickinson University | January 3–9, 2011 | 802 | ±3.5% | 44% | 34% | — | 22% |
| Public Policy Polling | January 6–9, 2011 | 520 | ±4.3% | 41% | 39% | — | 19% |
| Public Policy Polling | July 15–18, 2011 | 480 | ±4.5% | 44% | 39% | — | 16% |

| Poll source | Date(s) administered | Sample size | Margin of error | Bob Menendez (D) | Anna Little (R) | Other | Undecided |
|---|---|---|---|---|---|---|---|
| Fairleigh Dickinson University | January 2–8, 2012 | 800 | ±3.5% | 43% | 31% | — | 26% |
| Survey USA | February 24–26, 2012 | 533 | ±4.3% | 48% | 29% | — | 23% |

=== Results ===
United States Senate election in New Jersey, 2012
| Party | Candidate | Votes | % | ±% |
|---|---|---|---|---|
| Democratic | Bob Menendez (incumbent) | 1,987,680 | 58.87% | +5.50% |
| Republican | Joe Kyrillos | 1,329,534 | 39.37% | −4.97% |
| Libertarian | Kenneth R. Kaplan | 16,803 | 0.50% | −0.15% |
| Green | Ken Wolski | 15,801 | 0.47% | N/A |
| Independent | Gwen Diakos | 9,359 | 0.28% | N/A |
| Independent | J. David Dranikoff | 3,834 | 0.11% | N/A |
| Independent | Inder "Andy" Soni | 3,593 | 0.11% | N/A |
| Independent | Robert "Turk" Turkavage | 3,532 | 0.10% | N/A |
| Socialist | Greg Pason | 2,249 | 0.07% | −0.04% |
| Independent | Eugene M. LaVergne | 2,198 | 0.07% | N/A |
| Independent | Daryl Brooks | 2,066 | 0.06% | −0.17% |
| Total votes | | 3,376,649 | 100.0% | N/A |
| Democratic hold | | | | |

==== By county ====
| County | Bob Menendez December | | Joe Kyrillos Republican | | Various candidates Other parties | | Margin | | Total votes cast |
| County | # | % | # | % | # | % | # | % | Total votes cast |
|---|---|---|---|---|---|---|---|---|---|
| Atlantic | 61,464 | 58.19% | 42,378 | 40.12% | 1,792 | 1.70% | 19,086 | 18.07% | 105,634 |
| Bergen | 201,870 | 57.33% | 144,709 | 41.09% | 5,558 | 1.58% | 57,161 | 16.24% | 352,137 |
| Burlington | 121,211 | 59.05% | 82,374 | 40.13% | 1,670 | 0.81% | 38,837 | 18.92% | 205,255 |
| Camden | 148,925 | 69.47% | 62,734 | 29.26% | 2,722 | 1.27% | 86,191 | 40.21% | 214,381 |
| Cape May | 19,965 | 46.35% | 22,281 | 51.73% | 826 | 1.92% | -2,316 | -5.38% | 43,072 |
| Cumberland | 31,367 | 63.74% | 16,795 | 34.13% | 1,051 | 2.14% | 14,572 | 29.61% | 49,213 |
| Essex | 213,404 | 78.86% | 53,009 | 19.59% | 4,211 | 1.56% | 160,395 | 59.27% | 270,624 |
| Gloucester | 74,271 | 57.16% | 52,591 | 40.48% | 3,072 | 2.36% | 21,680 | 16.68% | 129,934 |
| Hudson | 139,910 | 79.35% | 32,876 | 18.64% | 3,545 | 2.01% | 107,034 | 60.71% | 176,331 |
| Hunterdon | 24,676 | 39.29% | 36,000 | 57.33% | 2,123 | 3.38% | -11,324 | -18.04% | 62,799 |
| Mercer | 97,964 | 67.73% | 43,793 | 30.28% | 2,890 | 1.99% | 54,171 | 37.45% | 144,647 |
| Middlesex | 178,686 | 63.42% | 97,730 | 34.69% | 5,344 | 1.90% | 80,956 | 28.73% | 281,760 |
| Monmouth | 120,154 | 44.67% | 144,366 | 53.67% | 4,444 | 1.65% | -24,212 | -9.00% | 268,964 |
| Morris | 93,209 | 44.42% | 114,078 | 54.36% | 2,561 | 1.22% | -20,869 | -9.94% | 209,848 |
| Ocean | 99,362 | 42.10% | 132,413 | 56.11% | 4,229 | 1.79% | -33,051 | -14.01% | 236,004 |
| Passaic | 105,286 | 64.91% | 54,149 | 33.38% | 2,780 | 1.71% | 51,137 | 31.53% | 162,215 |
| Salem | 15,044 | 52.51% | 12,555 | 43.82% | 1,050 | 3.67% | 2,489 | 8.69% | 28,649 |
| Somerset | 70,264 | 51.57% | 63,349 | 46.49% | 2,645 | 1.94% | 6,915 | 5.08% | 136,258 |
| Sussex | 25,212 | 38.03% | 38,250 | 57.70% | 2,831 | 4.27% | -13,038 | -19.67% | 66,293 |
| Union | 125,635 | 66.92% | 58,929 | 31.39% | 3,180 | 1.69% | 66,706 | 35.53% | 187,744 |
| Warren | 17,904 | 41.83% | 24,046 | 56.17% | 856 | 2.00% | -6,142 | -14.34% | 42,806 |
| Totals | 1,987,680 | 58.87% | 1,329,534 | 39.37% | 59,435 | 1.76% | 658,146 | 19.50% | 3,376,649 |

County that flipped from Republican to Democratic

- Somerset (largest municipality: Franklin Township)
- Salem (largest municipality: Pennsville Township)

==== By congressional district ====
Menendez won nine of 12 congressional districts, including three that elected Republicans to the House.

| District | Menendez | Kyrillos | Representative |
|---|---|---|---|
| 1st | 66.7% | 31.7% | Rob Andrews |
| 2nd | 54.6% | 43.3% | |
| 2nd | 54.6% | 43.3% | Frank LoBiondo |
| 3rd | 51.9% | 46.8% | Jon Runyan |
| 4th | 44.8% | 53.5% | Chris Smith |
| 5th | 49.3% | 48.8% | Scott Garrett |
| 6th | 60.7% | 37.4% | Frank Pallone |
| 7th | 46.1% | 51.8% | Leonard Lance |
| 8th | 80.4% | 17.7% | Bill Pascrell (112th Congress) |
| 8th | 80.4% | 17.7% | Albio Sires (113th Congress) |
| 9th | 70.4% | 27.9% | Steve Rothman (112th Congress) |
| 9th | 70.4% | 27.9% | Bill Pascrell (113th Congress) |
| 10th | 88.0% | 10.7% | Donald Payne Jr. |
| 11th | 47.5% | 50.8% | Rodney Frelinghuysen |
| 12th | 66.0% | 32.2% | Rush Holt Jr. |

== See also ==
- 2012 United States Senate elections
- 2012 United States House of Representatives elections in New Jersey
