= Nelson G. Gross =

American politician (1932–1997)

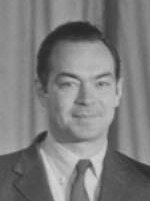
- Gross in 1970

Chair of the New Jersey Republican Party
- In office 1969–1970
- Preceded by: Webster B. Todd
- Succeeded by: John E. Dimon

Member of the New Jersey General Assembly from the Bergen County district
- In office January 9, 1962 – January 14, 1964
- Preceded by: Multi-member district
- Succeeded by: Multi-member district

Personal details
- Born: Nelson Gerard Gross; January 9, 1932 Teaneck, New Jersey, U.S.
- Died: September 17, 1997 (aged 65) New York City, New York, U.S.
- Cause of death: Homicide
- Spouses: Leah Binger (m. 1953, divorced) Edyth Noel Love (m. 1960)
- Children: Dinah Lenney
- Occupation: Politician
- Known for: Abduction and murder

Nelson Gerard Gross (January 9, 1932 – September 17, 1997) was an American Republican Party politician who served in the New Jersey General Assembly and as Chairman of the New Jersey Republican State Committee. His political career ended in 1974 when he was convicted on federal charges involving the 1969 campaign of Governor William T. Cahill. After his prison term he went on to a lucrative business career as a real estate developer and restaurateur, before being kidnapped and murdered in September 1997.

== Early years ==
Gross was born in 1932 in Teaneck, New Jersey to Albert S. and Rose (Nelson) Gross. He graduated from Teaneck High School in 1949 and from Yale University. After graduating from Columbia Law School he joined the law firm run by his father Albert in Englewood, New Jersey. He married Leah Binger in 1953. After a divorce, he married Edyth Noel Love, a Guggenheim heiress, on August 26, 1960.

== Political career ==
After briefly serving as an assistant United States Attorney, Gross became involved in the Bergen County Republican Party organization, then controlled by Walter H. Jones.

In 1961, at the age of 29, he was elected to a term in the New Jersey General Assembly. In 1966, he took over as chairman of the Bergen County Republican Committee.

Gross supported Richard M. Nixon over Nelson Rockefeller in the 1968 Republican presidential primaries. New Jersey Senator Clifford P. Case had launched a "favorite son" candidacy, with the aim of delivering the entire slate of New Jersey delegates to Rockefeller. Gross foiled this plan, managing to get 18 of the state's 40 delegates to support Nixon, thus helping to ensure Nixon's nomination at the Republican National Convention.

Gross served in 1969 as Coordinator on International Narcotics Matters in the Department of State and was sent by Secretary of State William P. Rogers to Uruguay.

In 1969, Gross supported William T. Cahill in the Republican primary for Governor of New Jersey. He organized support for Cahill in Bergen County, which proved to be critical in the primary election. After the primary, Gross was rewarded by being named Chairman of the New Jersey Republican State Committee by Cahill.

== Senate run and conviction ==
Gross resigned from the GOP chairmanship in April 1970 and announced his candidacy for United States Senator, with the backing of Governor Cahill. Cahill's support helped him win the Republican primary, but he lost in the general election to the Democratic incumbent, Harrison A. Williams, by about 250,000 votes.

In 1971 Gross was appointed by President Nixon as special assistant for International Narcotics Control in the office of the Secretary of State.

In early 1973 the U.S. Attorney's Office for the District of New Jersey began investigating irregularities involving campaign finances during Cahill's 1969 gubernatorial campaign. Gross was indicted in May 1973 on five counts of tax fraud and perjury. He was charged with advising businessman William H. Preis to conceal a $5,000 campaign contribution as a tax-deductible business expense and then telling Preis to lie to a federal grand jury. Gross was convicted on all five counts in March 1974.

After several appeals failed, Gross surrendered to federal authorities to begin a two-year prison term in June 1976. He would eventually serve just over six months of the term.

== Business career ==
After Gross was paroled in December 1977, he returned to Bergen County, managing a real estate business and operating the Binghamton Ferryboat, a restaurant converted from an old ferry moored off the shoreline of Edgewater, New Jersey. He was a principal in the Jinep Corporation, which held the lease on a 12-acre (49,000 m^{2}) waterfront lot in Edgewater, with tenants including a tennis club, a movie theater, a motel, a strip mall and an office building.

Gross and his wife Noel maintained homes in Saddle River, New Jersey; Bridgehampton, New York; and Palm Beach, Florida. Though Nelson Gross had abandoned his political career, Noel Love Gross remained active in Republican party politics. During the Reagan administration, she was a member of the United States delegation to the United Nations, and she later served on the Republican National Committee. She was a long-serving commissioner and former chairwoman of the New Jersey Racing Commission.

== Kidnapping and murder ==
Gross went missing on the morning of September 17, 1997. He was last seen driving his BMW on River Road in Edgewater, near his restaurant, the Binghamton Ferryboat. Other men were seen in the car with Gross as he drove to a bank near the restaurant and withdrew $20,000. A weeklong manhunt ensued, ending with the discovery of Gross's slashed and bludgeoned body on a wooded embankment between the Henry Hudson Parkway and the Hudson River.

Arrested for the murder were 17-year-old Christian Velez, 18-year-old Tony Estevez, and 17-year-old Miguel Grullon from Washington Heights, Manhattan. Velez worked as a busboy at the Binghamton. All three eventually pleaded guilty. They admitted to abducting Gross at gunpoint, forcing him to drive to a bank to withdraw money, and then killing him in a secluded spot along the Henry Hudson Parkway. U.S. District Judge Alfred M. Wolin sentenced Velez and Grullon to 30 years in prison and Estevez, who had agreed to testify for the prosecution had a trial taken place, to 17 years in prison. Estevez was released from prison on July 31, 2013, Velez was released from prison on March 20, 2024, and Miguel Grullon was released from prison on October 21, 2024.

Dinah Lenney, Gross's daughter by his first wife Leah, wrote a memoir about her father's murder, Bigger than Life: A Murder, a Memoir, published in 2007 by University of Nebraska Press (ISBN 978-0803229761).

== See also ==
- List of kidnappings

Party political offices
Preceded by Webster B. Todd	Chairman of the New Jersey Republican State Committee; 1969–1970	Succeeded by John E. Dimon
Preceded by Bernard M. Shanley	Republican Nominee for the U.S. Senate (Class 1) from New Jersey; 1970	Succeeded by David A. Norcross
