= 1970 United States Senate election in New Jersey =

- November 3, 1970
- Turnout: 70% (▼18pp)
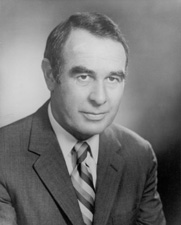

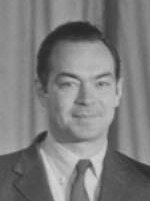
Nominee	Harrison A. Williams	Nelson G. Gross
Party	Democratic	Republican
Popular vote	1,157,074	903,026
Percentage	54.02%	42.16%
- County results Williams: 40–50% 50–60% 60–70% Gross: 40–50% 50–60%
U.S. senator before election
Harrison A. Williams
Democratic
Elected U.S. senator
Harrison A. Williams
Democratic

The 1970 United States Senate election in New Jersey was held on November 3, 1970. Incumbent Democrat Harrison A. Williams defeated Republican nominee Nelson G. Gross with 54.02% of the vote.

Primary elections were held on June 2, 1970. Williams held off a challenge from the Hudson County party organization in the form of State Senator Frank Guarini, while Gross prevailed over two candidates without organizational support.

== Background ==
Harrison Williams was first elected to the United States Senate in 1958; he narrowly defeated Hoboken mayor John Grogan in the Democratic primary and U.S. representative Robert Kean in the general election. He was re-elected in a landslide in 1964.

In 1968, Williams was formally censured by the New Jersey chapter of the NAACP after he addressed their annual convention drunk. After the censure, leaders in both parties saw Williams as politically vulnerable, with Republicans hoping to gain his seat and Middlesex County Democratic boss David Wilentz weighing replacing him on the ballot.

== Democratic primary ==
=== Candidates ===
- Frank Joseph Guarini, state senator from Hudson County
- Harrison A. Williams, incumbent U.S. senator since 1959

=== Campaign ===
Guarini ran as the candidate of the powerful Hudson County machine. As in 1958, the machine hoped to defeat Williams by running up a large margin in Hudson County, which accounted for the majority of the state's Democratic vote. Guarini campaigned on themes that echoed Republican President Richard Nixon's 1968 campaign, calling himself a candidate who would uphold “law and order” and a champion of the “silent majority” and the “forgotten taxpayer." Guarini also emphasized his Italian ancestry.

In a May interview with The New York Times, Williams confessed to past struggles resulting from alcoholism and said that he had been sober for eighteen months, shortly after his disastrous NAACP speech. The interview prompted Guarini campaign manager Arthur J. Sills to claim the party should not "risk" supporting a former alcoholic. Sills was rebuked by most of the party leadership in New Jersey, including former governor Richard J. Hughes, under whom Sills had served as Attorney General. Hughes praised Williams's courage, and he denounced Guarini as "someone who crawled out of the woodwork" and Sills for trying to inject “the meanest kind of issue” into the race. Hughes further suggested Sills, who used a wheelchair due to polio, “ought to be the last man in the world to hurt anybody with a disease, illness or handicap.”

Of all primary candidates in either party, Williams took the strongest stance against American involvement in the Vietnam War; he called for unilateral withdrawal within one year. Guarini also supported withdrawal but contended that the United States should have gone into Vietnam to win instead of “tying the generals' hands.”

Williams received the unified support of organized labor late in the campaign. After Senator Ralph Yarborough unexpectedly lost the Democratic primary in Texas to Lloyd Bentsen on May 2, Williams became the potential next chair of the Committee on Labor and Public Welfare. As a result, national labor unions flooded New Jersey with donations and volunteers in support of Williams.

=== Results ===
Democratic primary results
Party	Candidate	Votes	%
Democratic	Harrison A. Williams (incumbent)	190,692	65.59%
Democratic	Frank Joseph Guarini	100,045	34.41%
Total votes		290,737	100.00

Williams won the primary easily; he nearly finished even with Guarini in Hudson County.

== Republican primary ==
=== Candidates ===
- Joseph T. Gavin
- Nelson G. Gross, chair of the New Jersey Republican State Committee and former assemblyman from Saddle River
- James A. Quaremba, Ridgewood attorney

==== Declined ====
- Joseph Maraziti, State Senator from Morris County

=== Campaign ===
Nelson Gross resigned his position as party chairman on April 9 to enter the race for Senate with the full-backing of Governor William T. Cahill. Cahill's support discouraged any serious contenders from challenging Gross in the primary. Gross also had the support of President Richard Nixon. As a member of the New Jersey delegation to the 1968 Republican National Convention, Gross had flipped from favorite son Clifford Case to support Nixon and helped secure his nomination.

Gross was nonetheless privately criticized as a poor choice by some Republicans due to his ongoing investigation by the United States Department of Justice for involvement with a Mafia-backed labor union. The investigation was led by U.S. Attorney Frederick Bernard Lacey, who had been personally recommended to the Nixon administration by Senator Clifford Case. Case and Gross had been on uneven terms since Gross undermined Case's "favorite son" status at the 1968 Republican National Convention by bringing Bergen County delegates into the Nixon column.

On the war issue, Gross advocated for congressional restriction on the American incursion into Cambodia, but withheld calling for unilateral withdrawal, pending a fact-finding trip he pledged to take after the primary. Quaremba defended the Nixon administration's policy.

Quaremba emphasized his Italian ancestry in the campaign.

Joseph Gavin did not campaign actively. He ran only to provide a Senate heading on the ballot line for Assemblyman Walter T. Smith, who was running for the U.S. House of Representatives.

By the end of the campaign, observers said that Gross had an "insurmountable" lead over Quaremba. He largely ignored Quaremba's campaign and spent the final week of the primary filming television ads for the general election.

=== Results ===
Although Gross won the primary easily, his margin was less than expected by many observers. Republican officials attributed the large vote against him to his position on the Vietnam War and support for restrictions on the Nixon administration.

Republican primary results
Party	Candidate	Votes	%
Republican	Nelson G. Gross	150,662	65.39%
Republican	James A. Quaremba	43,547	18.90%
Republican	Joseph T. Gavin	36,208	15.71%
Total votes		230,417	100.00

== General election ==
=== Candidates ===
- Nelson G. Gross, former chairman of the New Jersey Republican State Committee and State Assemblyman (Republican)
- Joseph F. Job, Bergen County Sheriff (Independent)
- Jules Levin (Socialist Labor)
- Joseph S. Mans (Independent)
- William J. O'Grady (Independent)
- Harrison A. Williams, incumbent Senator since 1959 (Democratic)

=== Campaign ===
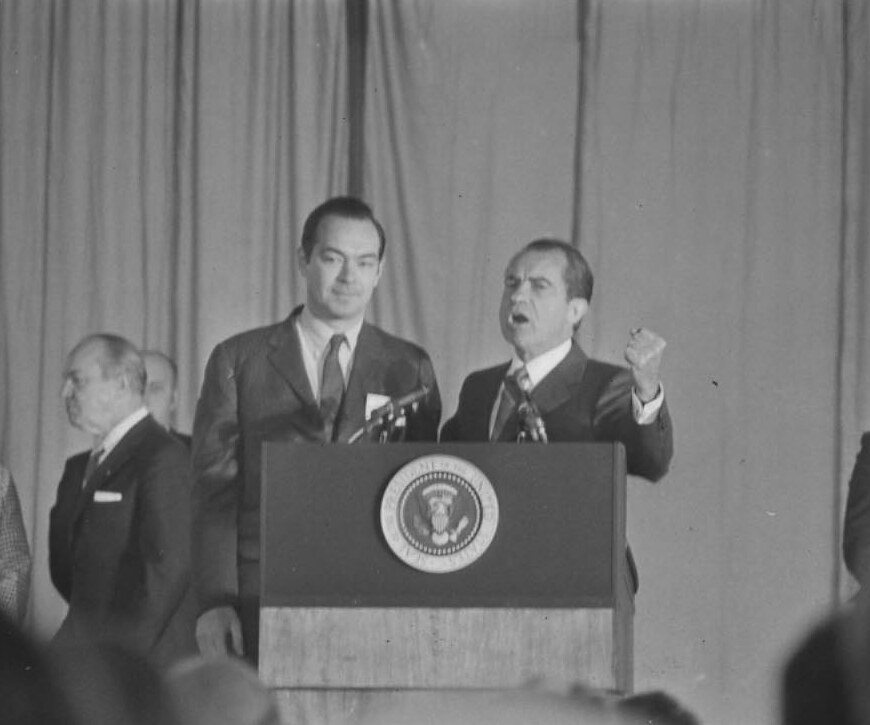
Gross campaigned with President Richard Nixon in Ocean Grove on October 17.

Gross assailed Williams as a "radical liberal" and implied that he was involved in "influence peddling" for having sponsored special bills for about 70 Chinese seamen who jumped ship in the United States.

In mid-October, President Richard Nixon campaigned for Gross as part of a one-day swing through Pennsylvania, Vermont, Wisconsin and New Jersey.

=== Debates ===
Williams declined numerous calls for debates.

=== Endorsements ===
Harrison Williams

Newspapers

- The New York Times
- The Trenton Times
- The Star-Ledger
Nelson Gross

U.S. executive branch officials

- Richard Nixon, 37th president of the United States

Newspapers

- The Hackensack Record
- The Newark Sunday News

=== Polling ===
Poll source	Date(s) administered	Sample size	Margin of error	Harrison Williams (D)	Nelson Gross (R)	Other	Undecided
RSCC (Note: Poll released by the Gross campaign.)	October 15, 1970	?	± ?%	36%	32%	3%	29%

=== Results ===
1970 United States Senate election in New Jersey
Party	Candidate	Votes	%	±%
Democratic	Harrison A. Williams (incumbent)	1,157,074	54.02%	▼7.89
Republican	Nelson G. Gross	903,026	42.16%	▲4.84
Independent	Joseph F. Job	58,992	2.75%	N/A
Independent	William J. O'Grady	12,938	0.60%	N/A
Independent	Joseph S. Mans	6,066	0.28%	N/A
Socialist Labor	Jules Levin	4,009	0.19%	▲0.11
Majority		254,048		
Turnout		2,142,105		
Democratic hold		Swing		

==== By county ====
By county

County	Williams votes	Williams %	Gross votes	Gross %	Other votes	Other %
Atlantic	27,618	47.5%	28,592	49.1%	1,966	3.4%
Bergen	163,212	49.9%	128,591	39.3%	35,346	10.8%
Burlington	37,382	52.6%	32,640	45.9%	1,044	1.5%
Camden	65,597	53.5%	55,483	45.2%	1,586	1.2%
Cape May	9,591	42.0%	12,797	56.1%	426	1.8%
Cumberland	17,605	53.3%	15,169	45.9%	243	0.7%
Essex	146,129	59.2%	94,615	38.3%	6,109	2.5%
Gloucester	25,586	47.2%	28,341	52.2%	335	0.6%
Hudson	121,345	68.0%	51,879	29.1%	5,185	2.9%
Hunterdon	9,556	45.4%	11,161	53.0%	339	1.6%
Mercer	53,084	58.7%	35,881	39.7%	1,427	1.5%
Middlesex	101,458	59.7%	65,305	38.4%	3,194	1.9%
Monmouth	65,003	50.7%	59,977	46.8%	3,162	2.4%
Morris	50,615	44.8%	58,702	52.0%	3,537	3.1%
Ocean	30,509	44.8%	35,975	52.8%	1,635	2.4%
Passaic	67,683	53.0%	52,217	40.9%	7,748	6.0%
Salem	10,302	51.6%	9,577	48.0%	71	0.3%
Somerset	28,739	47.7%	29,885	49.6%	1,651	2.8%
Sussex	10,030	43.5%	12,706	55.1%	343	1.5%
Union	104,392	56.5%	73,749	39.9%	6,491	3.5%
Warren	11,638	53.9%	9,784	45.3%	167	0.8%
Total	1,157,074	54.0%	903,026	42.2%	82,005	3.8%

Counties that flipped from Democratic to Republican

- Atlantic
- Cape May
- Hunterdon
- Gloucester
- Ocean
- Somerset
