= Binghamton (ferryboat) =

Ferryboat on the Hudson River

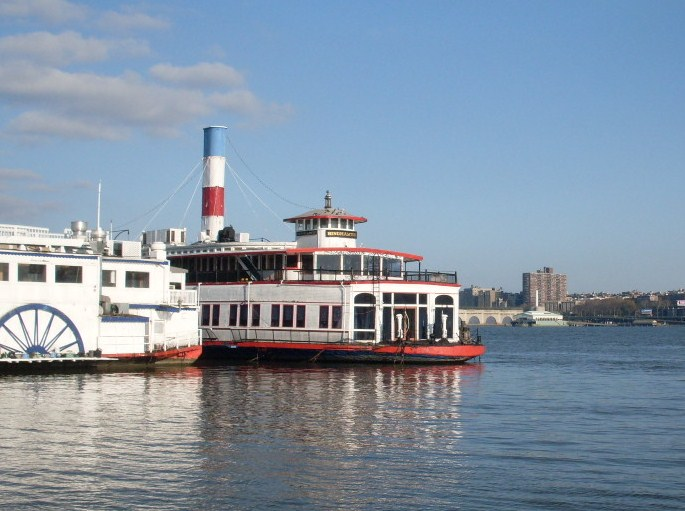
- Binghamton at Edgewater, New Jersey

History
- Name: Binghamton
- Operator: Hoboken Ferry Co., subsidiary of DL&W RR
- Builder: Newport News Shipbuilding and Drydock Company
- Laid down: 1904
- Launched: February 20, 1905
- In service: April 3, 1905
- Out of service: November 22, 1967
- Fate: Sold for restaurant conversion, 1969; Scrapped in 2017

General characteristics
- Tonnage: 1,462 gt
- Length: 231 ft (70.4 m)
- Draft: 10.5 ft (3.2 m)
- Propulsion: Double-compound reciprocating steam engine having four cylinders, rated 1,400 horsepower, taking steam from two coal-fired single-end Scotch boilers (removed) at 150 lbs working pressure, and driving a screw-propeller at each end on continuous shafting
- Capacity: 986 passengers (plus vehicles)
- Ferryboat Binghamton
- U.S. National Register of Historic Places
- New Jersey Register of Historic Places
- Location within Bergen County, New Jersey Location within New Jersey Location within the United States
- Location: 725 River Rd, Edgewater, New Jersey
- Coordinates: 40°49′10″N 73°58′33″W
- Built: 1904-05
- Architects: Gardner & Cox
- Architectural style: July 9, 1982
- NRHP reference No.: 82003262
- NJRHP No.: 464
- Designated NJRHP: May 11, 1982

The Binghamton was a ferryboat that transported passengers across the Hudson River between Manhattan and Hoboken from 1905 to 1967. Moored in 1971 at Edgewater, Bergen County, New Jersey, United States, the ship was operated as a floating restaurant from 1975 to 2007. In 2017, following ten years of damage that effectively rendered the boat unrestorable, the ferry was dismantled. No structural components were salvaged.

Binghamton was built for the Delaware, Lackawanna and Western Railroad's Hoboken Ferry Company to carry 986 passengers and their vehicles. Added to the National Register of Historic Places on July 9, 1982, the Binghamton was possibly the last surviving steam ferry built to serve New York Harbor, where commercial steam navigation and double-ended steam ferries got their start, and which was profoundly shaped by vessels of this kind.

== Background ==
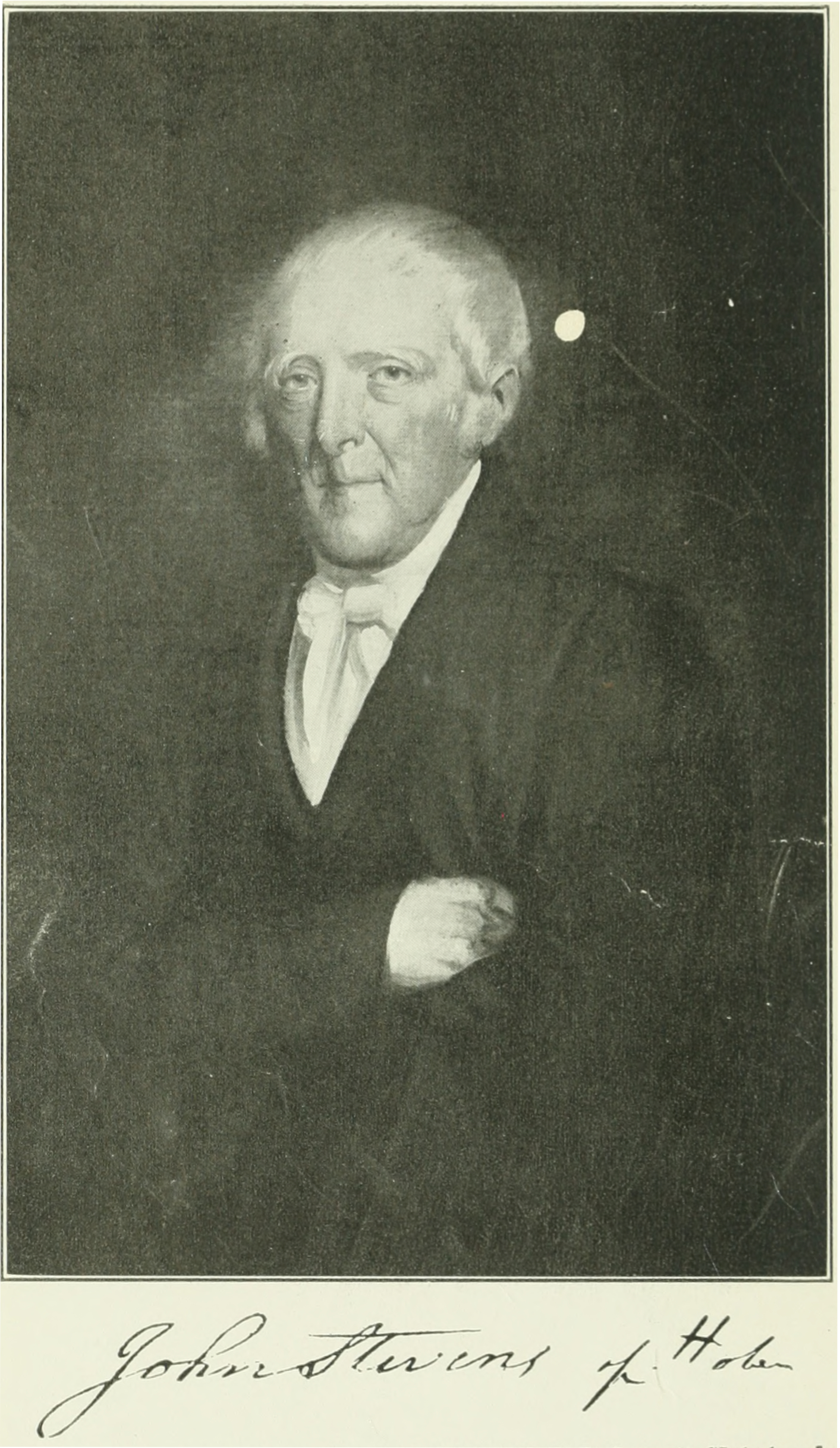
John Stevens of Hoboken inaugurated the world's first steam ferry service between Hoboken and Manhattan in 1811.

Until the Pennsylvania Railroad built Pennsylvania Station in Manhattan and tunneled under the Hudson River, all New York-bound rail lines from the west terminated at the New Jersey shoreline of New York Harbor. Accordingly, a number of independent and railroad-affiliated ferry companies provided passenger and light freight service across the harbor. One particular type of ferryboat, the "double-ender," was especially common in New York Harbor.

Steam navigation met its first commercial success in New York Harbor, with the voyage of Robert Fulton's North River Steamboat (Clermont) from New York to Albany in 1807. Four years later, in 1811, John Stevens inaugurated what is thought to be the world's first steam ferry service on the Hudson River between Hoboken and Manhattan with the vessel Juliana. The first American double-ended ferries appeared the following year with the paddle-wheelers Jersey and York of Robert Fulton's York & Jersey Steamboat Ferry Company. Excellent for transporting vehicles, the double-enders were well adapted to New York Harbor, where there was considerable demand for speed and efficiency (vehicles could drive on and off from either end, and time-consuming turns were not necessary). It has been estimated that over 400 double-ended ferries operated in New York Harbor during the nineteenth and twentieth centuries. The peak years were 1906-1908 when approximately 150 double-ended ferries were in service in the harbor.

The Hoboken Ferry Company was a subsidiary of the Delaware, Lackawanna and Western Railroad (DL&W). The company had a fleet of six ferryboats when it ceased operations in 1967. These vessels took their names from principal stations on the DL&W RR's main line from Hoboken, New Jersey to Buffalo, New York. Three of these - the Elmira, Scranton, and Pocono (née Scandinavia) - the Binghamton's sisters, were also built in 1905. Another is the Ithaca, which was destroyed by a fire in 1946. Of these, the Binghamton was the last survivor.

The Binghamton's engine: 4 cylinder, double compound, marine steam engine. Like the double ended ferryboat Binghamton, this engine is of an axially symmetric design. Double compound engines were superseded by more efficient Triple expansion steam engines.

== History ==
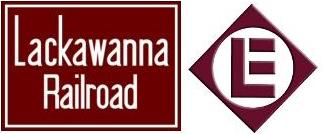
The Binghamton wore the funnel markings of the DL&W (left) before 1960 and of the Erie-Lackawanna RR (right) at the end of her career.

The Binghamton (Hull #49) was one of five identical screw-propeller, double-ended ferryboats built by the Newport News Shipbuilding and Dry-dock Company at Newport News, Virginia in 1904–06 to designs by Gardner & Cox, naval architects. She was launched on February 20, 1905, with Miss Charlotte Emery, daughter of John M. Emery, the newly promoted superintendent of the Hoboken Ferry Company and Ferry Department of the DL&W, serving as her sponsor. The Binghamton was completed a month later and left the Newport News yard on March 25 for the trip to Hoboken, New Jersey. She was placed in commission on April 3. Her Captain for the first crossing was Oren D. Relyea.

Her normal run was from the Hoboken Terminal to Barclay Street, a twelve-minute journey of approximately 1 and 3/4 miles, a trip made continuously nearly every day for more than sixty years (on occasion she substituted on the Hoboken - 23rd Street run).

As alternate methods of travel across the harbor were implemented, ferry transport diminished. The opening of the Pennsylvania Railroad line to Penn Station in Manhattan (1907); the Hudson and Manhattan Rapid Transit Line (1907); the Holland and Lincoln tunnels (1927; 1937); and the George Washington Bridge (1931) all contributed to the decline of the ferries. In 1960, the DL&W RR merged with the Erie Railroad to form the Erie-Lackawanna Railroad. The last ferry crossing of the Hoboken company, in operation since 1821, took place on November 22, 1967, when the railroad closed its trans-Hudson operations and offered its ferries for sale. The Erie-Lackawanna Railroad eventually filed for bankruptcy before being absorbed into Conrail in 1976.

Hudson River ferry service later experienced a revival, beginning with services provided by NY Waterway in December 1986. These services are maintained by small, single-ended diesel-powered pedestrian ferries that carry on the tradition of their steam-powered predecessors. Traditional double-ended ferries (diesel-powered) meanwhile continue to serve in New York Harbor on the Staten Island Ferry.

== Restaurant conversion ==
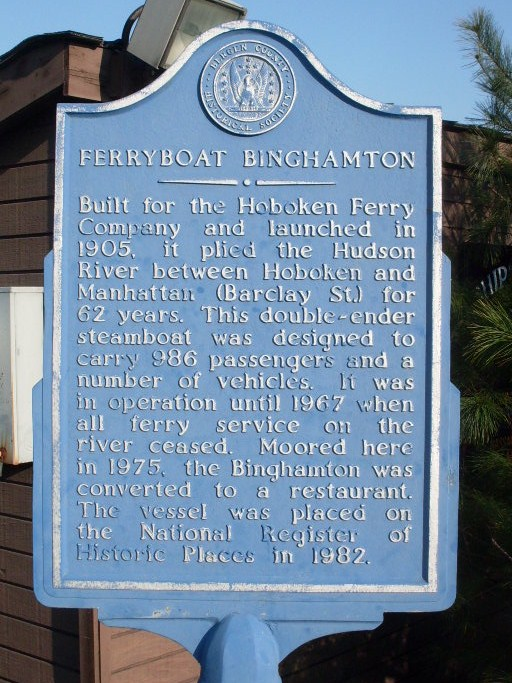
The Binghamton retired in 1967.

The Binghamton was acquired in 1969 by Edward Russo, an Edgewater, NJ contractor, for conversion into a restaurant. Russo planned large dining rooms on the Upper and Main decks, plus two pubs in the former engine room. He leased a berth at Edgewater, NJ, and scheduled a grand opening for Labor Day, 1970. But a tug strike and delays in dredging her berth at Edgewater indefinitely postponed these plans.

The Binghamton moved to Edgewater in 1971. Unable to find a concessionaire to operate the restaurant, Russo relinquished control of the vessel in 1973. In late 1974, the Binghamton was sold to Ferry Binghamton Inc., of Hackensack, New Jersey, for conversion to a restaurant and nightclub. On February 28, 1975, her new owners had the vessel moved to a new permanent berth about one half mile downstream. The restaurant opened later that year.

The US Department of the Interior listed the Binghamton on the National Register of Historic Places in 1982. In 1997 the vessel made headlines when its owner, tycoon and former New Jersey Assembly Speaker Nelson Gross, was found murdered in Manhattan. The restaurant, known as "Binghamton's", remained in business for ten years, but closed by late 2007, after which the Binghamton remained unused at her berth in Edgewater. In July 2011 the owner applied for a demolition permit. As of May 2012, the ferry had taken on water and was partially submerged. It was further swamped during Hurricane Sandy sometime between October 29 and 30, 2012.

The ferry suffered a fire on Sunday, May 19, 2013, that was investigated by the Edgewater Police and the Bergen County arson squad. The owner, Daniel Kim, said that there was no damage to the boat. He further stated that he was closing on a deal to have a subtenant demolish and remove the ferry from the site, with plans to open a restaurant on a barge at that location. Demolition was expected to start in December 2016, and was completed by mid-2017. A replacement floating restaurant, named Binghamton II, was scheduled to open in Summer 2018, but to this day, no progress has been made for the future restaurant.

On July 26, 2017, the dismantling of the ferry began. Efforts to save the pilot houses were in vain when the demolition crew damaged the pilot houses in the process of removing them from the ferryboat's roof.

== See also ==
- Delaware, Lackawanna and Western Railroad
- Hoboken Terminal
- Erie Railroad
- Erie Lackawanna Railway
- Robert Fulton
- John Stevens (inventor)
- Eureka (ferryboat)
- Berkeley (ferryboat)
- Hudson River Waterfront Walkway
- National Register of Historic Places listings in Bergen County, New Jersey
- List of ferries across the Hudson River to New York City
