= 2010 United States House of Representatives elections in New Jersey =

- November 4, 2010

All 13 New Jersey seats to the United States House of Representatives
- Turnout: 42% (▼31pp)
| | Majority party | Minority party |
|---|---|---|
| Party | Democratic | Republican |
| Last election | 8 | 5 |
| Seats won | 7 | 6 |
| Seat change | ▼1 | ▲1 |
| Popular vote | 1,024,730 | 1,055,299 |
| Percentage | 48.30% | 49.74% |
| Swing | ▼7.3% | ▲7.2% |

Democratic hold
Republican hold Republican gain
Democratic
40–50%
50–60%
60–70%
70–80%
80–90%
Republican
50–60%
60–70%
70–80%

The 2010 United States House of Representatives elections in New Jersey were held on November 4, 2010, to elect the 13 U.S. representatives from the state of New Jersey, one from each of the state's 13 congressional districts. The primary election in which candidates were chosen took place on June 8, 2010.

As of 2026, this is the last election in which the Republican Party won a plurality of the statewide popular vote for United States House, even though they did not win a majority of congressional seats. As a result, New Jersey became one of four states in which the party that won the state's popular vote did not win a majority of seats in 2010, the other states being Iowa, Illinois, and North Carolina.

== Overview ==
United States House of Representatives elections in New Jersey, 2010
| Party | Votes | Percentage | Seats | +/– |
|---|---|---|---|---|
| Republican | 1,055,299 | 49.74% | 6 | +1 |
| Democratic | 1,024,730 | 48.30% | 7 | -1 |
| Libertarian | 8,536 | 0.40% | 0 | — |
| Green | 7,494 | 0.35% | 0 | — |
| Constitution | 4,120 | 0.19% | 0 | — |
| Independents | 21,405 | 1.01% | 0 | — |
| Totals | 2,121,584 | 100.00% | 13 | — |

== District 1 ==
2010 New Jersey's 1st congressional district election
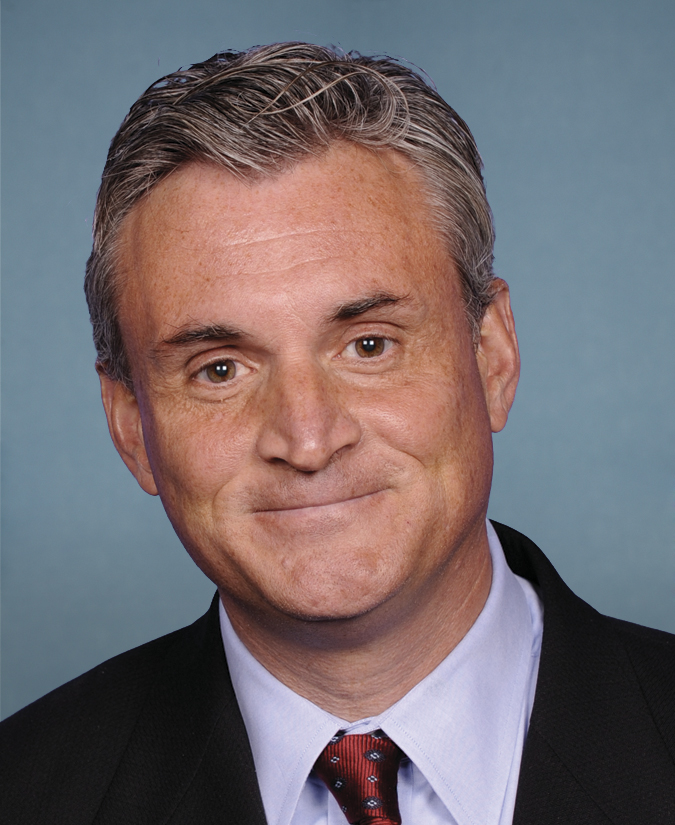

| Nominee | Rob Andrews | Dale Glading |
| Party | Democratic | Republican |
| Popular vote | 106,334 | 58,562 |
| Percentage | 63.19% | 34.80% |
- Andrews: 40–50% 50–60% 60–70% 70–80% 80–90% >90% Glading: 40–50% 60–70% >90%
U.S. Representative before election
Rob Andrews
Democratic
Elected U.S. Representative
Rob Andrews
Democratic

Democrat Rob Andrews has been in Congress since 1990. He won re-election in 2008 with 72%.

=== Democratic primary ===
==== Candidates ====
- Rob Andrews, incumbent Representative from Haddon Heights since 1990
- John Caramanna, candidate for this seat in 2008

==== Results ====
2010 Democratic U.S. House primary
| Party | Candidate | Votes | % |
|---|---|---|---|
| Democratic | Rob Andrews (incumbent) | 14,695 | 86.66% |
| Democratic | John Caramanna | 2,262 | 13.34% |
| Total votes | | 16,957 | 100.00% |

=== Republican primary ===
==== Candidates ====
- Dale Glading, founder of Saints Prison Ministry and nominee for this seat in 2008
- Lee Lucas
- Loran M. Oglesby
- Fernando Powers, candidate for this seat in 2008

==== Results ====
2010 Republican U.S. House primary
| Party | Candidate | Votes | % |
|---|---|---|---|
| Republican | Dale M. Glading | 5,315 | 54.81% |
| Republican | Loran M. Oglesby | 2,718 | 28.03% |
| Republican | Fernando Powers | 1,401 | 14.45% |
| Republican | Lee Lucas | 264 | 2.72% |
| Total votes | | 9,698 | 100.00% |

=== General election ===
==== Candidates ====
- Rob Andrews, incumbent Representative from Haddon Heights since 1990 (Democratic)
- Margaret M. Chapman, candidate for this seat in 2008 (Time for Change)
- Dale Glading, founder of Saints Prison Ministry and nominee for this seat in 2008 (Republican)
- Mark Heacock (Green)
- Nicky I. Petrutz (Defend American Constitution)

==== Predictions ====
| Source | Ranking | As of |
|---|---|---|
| The Cook Political Report | Safe D | November 1, 2010 |
| Rothenberg | Safe D | November 1, 2010 |
| Sabato's Crystal Ball | Safe D | November 1, 2010 |
| RCP | Safe D | November 1, 2010 |
| CQ Politics | Safe D | October 28, 2010 |
| New York Times | Safe D | November 1, 2010 |
| FiveThirtyEight | Safe D | November 1, 2010 |

==== Results ====
2010 U.S. House election
| Party | Candidate | Votes | % | ±% |
|---|---|---|---|---|
| Democratic | Rob Andrews (incumbent) | 106,334 | 63.19% | ▼9.21 |
| Republican | Dale Glading | 58,562 | 34.80% | ▲8.85 |
| Green | Mark Heacock | 1,593 | 0.95% | ▲0.27 |
| Independent | Margaret Chapman | 1,257 | 0.75% | ▲0.31 |
| Independent | Nicky Petrutz | 521 | 0.31% | N/A |
| Total votes | | 168,267 | 100.00% | |
| Democratic hold | | Swing | {{{swing}}} | |

==== By county ====
| County | Rob Andrews Democratic | | Dale Glading Republican | | Various candidates Other parties | | Margin | | Total votes cast |
| County | # | % | # | % | # | % | # | % | Total votes cast |
|---|---|---|---|---|---|---|---|---|---|
| Burlington (part) | 4,086 | 59.7% | 2,627 | 38.4% | 132 | 1.9% | 1,459 | 21.3% | 6,845 |
| Camden (part) | 70,338 | 67.2% | 32,572 | 31.1% | 1,770 | 1.8% | 37,766 | 36.1% | 104,680 |
| Gloucester (part) | 31,910 | 56.2% | 23,363 | 41.2% | 1,469 | 2.6% | 8,547 | 15.0% | 56,742 |
| Totals | 106,334 | 63.2% | 58,562 | 34.8% | 3,371 | 2.0% | 47,772 | 28.4% | 168,267 |

== District 2 ==
2010 New Jersey's 2nd congressional district election
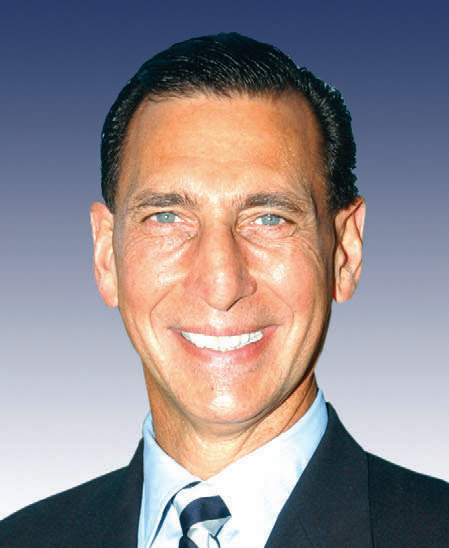

| Nominee | Frank LoBiondo | Gary Stein |
| Party | Republican | Democratic |
| Popular vote | 109,460 | 51,690 |
| Percentage | 65.50% | 30.93% |
- County results *: 50–60% 60–70% 70–80%
U.S. Representative before election
Frank LoBiondo
Republican
Elected U.S. Representative
Frank LoBiondo
Republican

Republican Frank LoBiondo has been in Congress since 1995. He won re-election in 2008 with 59%, despite Democrat Barack Obama simultaneously carrying the district.

=== Republican primary ===
==== Candidates ====
- Linda Biamonte
- Frank LoBiondo, incumbent Representative from Millville since 1995
- Donna M. Ward, candidate for this seat in 2008

==== Results ====
2010 Republican U.S. House primary
| Party | Candidate | Votes | % |
|---|---|---|---|
| Republican | Frank LoBiondo (incumbent) | 19,337 | 78.06% |
| Republican | Linda Biamonte | 2,984 | 12.05% |
| Republican | Donna M. Ward | 2,025 | 8.17% |
| Total votes | | 24,772 | 100.00% |

=== Democratic primary ===
==== Candidates ====
- Gary Stein

==== Results ====
2010 Democratic U.S. House primary
| Party | Candidate | Votes | % |
|---|---|---|---|
| Democratic | Gary Stein | 5,441 | 100.00% |
| Total votes | | 5,441 | 100.00% |

=== General election ===
==== Candidates ====
- Peter Boyce, nominee for this seat in 2008 (Constitution)
- Frank LoBiondo, incumbent Representative from Millville since 1995 (Republican)
- Mark Lovett (marklovett.us)
- Gary Stein, perennial candidate (Democratic)
- Vitov Valdes-Munoz (American Labor)

==== Predictions ====
| Source | Ranking | As of |
|---|---|---|
| The Cook Political Report | Safe R | November 1, 2010 |
| Rothenberg | Safe R | November 1, 2010 |
| Sabato's Crystal Ball | Safe R | November 1, 2010 |
| RCP | Safe R | November 1, 2010 |
| CQ Politics | Safe R | October 28, 2010 |
| New York Times | Safe R | November 1, 2010 |
| FiveThirtyEight | Safe R | November 1, 2010 |

==== Results ====
2010 U.S. House election
| Party | Candidate | Votes | % | ±% |
|---|---|---|---|---|
| Republican | Frank LoBiondo (incumbent) | 109,460 | 65.50% | ▲6.44 |
| Democratic | Gary Stein | 51,690 | 30.93% | ▼8.16 |
| Constitution | Peter Boyce | 4,120 | 2.47% | ▲1.92 |
| Independent | Mark Lovett | 1,123 | 0.67% | N/A |
| Independent | Vitov Valdez-Munoz | 727 | 0.44% | N/A |
| Total votes | | 172,906 | 100.00% | |
| Republican hold | | | | |

==== By county ====
| County | Frank LoBiondo Republican | | Gary Stein Democratic | | Various candidates Other parties | | Margin | | Total votes cast |
| County | # | % | # | % | # | % | # | % | Total votes cast |
|---|---|---|---|---|---|---|---|---|---|
| Atlantic | 39,254 | 63.0% | 21,220 | 34.0% | 2,482 | 3.0% | 18,034 | 29.0% | 62,356 |
| Burlington (part) | 1,464 | 76.3% | 420 | 21.9% | 35 | 1.8% | 1,044 | 54.4% | 1,919 |
| Camden (part) | 1,734 | 60.3% | 1,059 | 36.8% | 81 | 2.9% | 675 | 23.5% | 2,874 |
| Cape May | 22,011 | 76.7% | 5,653 | 19.7% | 1,025 | 3.6% | 16,358 | 57.0% | 28,689 |
| Cumberland | 17,204 | 59.5% | 10,200 | 35.3% | 1,530 | 5.2% | 7,004 | 24.2% | 28,934 |
| Gloucester (part) | 14,171 | 63.4% | 7,568 | 33.8% | 662 | 2.7% | 6,603 | 29.6% | 22,361 |
| Salem | 13,622 | 68.2% | 5,570 | 27.9% | 795 | 3.9% | 8,052 | 40.3% | 19,987 |
| Totals | 109,460 | 65.5% | 51,690 | 30.9% | 5,970 | 3.6% | 57,770 | 34.6% | 167,120 |

== District 3 ==
2010 New Jersey's 3rd congressional district election
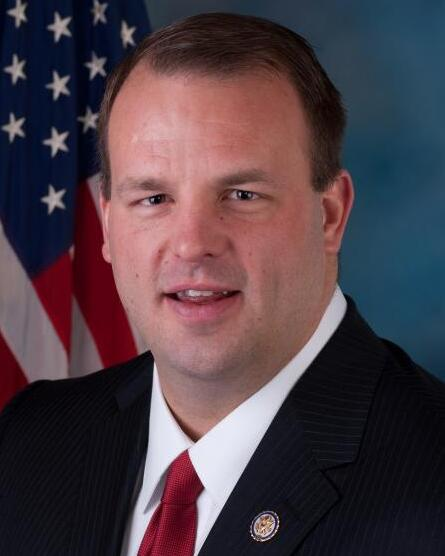

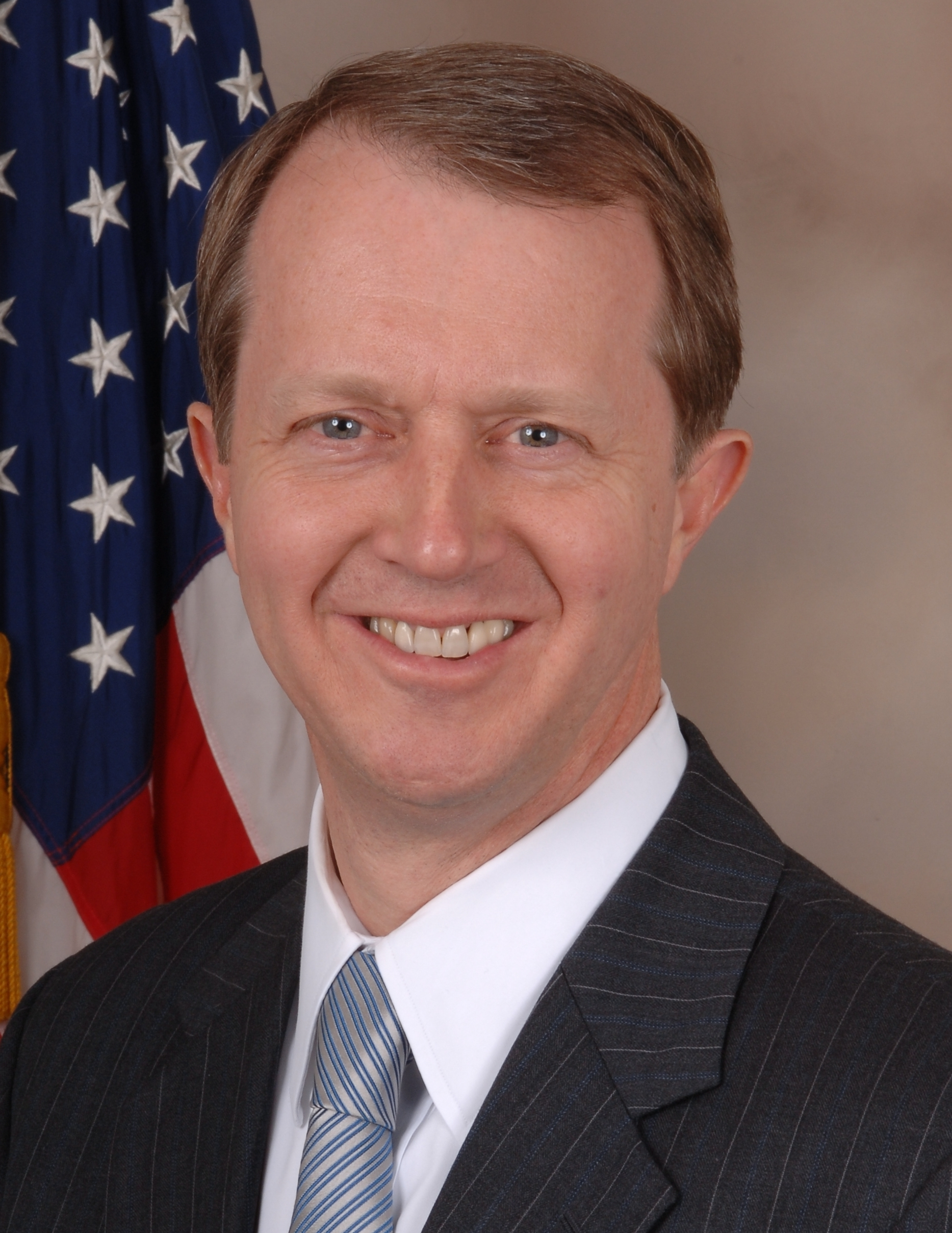
| Nominee | Jon Runyan | John Adler |
| Party | Republican | Democratic |
| Popular vote | 105,084 | 71,902 |
| Percentage | 50.0% | 47.3% |
- County results Runyan: 50–60% Adler: 50–60%
U.S. Representative before election
John Adler
Democratic
Elected U.S. Representative
Jon Runyan
Republican

In 2008, state senator John Adler defeated Chris Myers, a town councilman, with 52% of the vote, while Barack Obama carried the district with the same amount in the presidential election.

Retired NFL player Jon Runyan was a star offensive lineman who played most of his career with the nearby Philadelphia Eagles as the South Jersey district is a suburb of Philadelphia. With $1.7 million in Adler's campaign account back in April, he had a major cash advantage.

=== Democratic primary ===
==== Candidates ====
- John Adler, incumbent Representative from Cherry Hill since 2009
- Barry D. Bendar, activist and chair of the Lacey Township Democratic Committee

==== Results ====
2010 Democratic U.S. House primary
| Party | Candidate | Votes | % |
|---|---|---|---|
| Democratic | John Adler (incumbent) | 11,833 | 75.13% |
| Democratic | Barry D. Bendar | 3,916 | 24.87% |
| Total votes | | 15,749 | 100.00% |

=== Republican primary ===
==== Candidates ====
- Justin Michael Murphy, deputy mayor of Tabernacle and candidate for this seat in 2008
- Jon Runyan, former offensive lineman for the Philadelphia Eagles

==== Campaign ====
In May, Runyan took the unusual step of revealing that he had been late to pay some taxes and had been sued in connection with some business dealings. He claimed he was "a different type of candidate" by acknowledging his mistakes.

==== Results ====
2010 Republican U.S. House primary
| Party | Candidate | Votes | % |
|---|---|---|---|
| Republican | Jon Runyan | 17,250 | 60.41% |
| Republican | Justin Michael Murphy | 11,304 | 39.59% |
| Total votes | | 28,554 | 100.00% |

=== General election ===
==== Candidates ====
- John Adler, incumbent Representative from Cherry Hill since 2009 (Democratic)
- Russ Conger (Libertarian)
- Lawrence J. Donahue (Your Country Again)
- Peter DeStefano, Mount Holly picture framer (NJ Tea Party)
- Jon Runyan, former offensive lineman for the Philadelphia Eagles (Republican)

==== Campaign ====
On October 8, 2010, the Courier-Post reported that Steve Ayscue, the head of operations for the Camden County Democratic Committee, and Geoff Mackler, an employee of the Democratic Congressional Campaign Committee sent to manage Adler's campaign, had orchestrated the paper candidacy of Peter DeStefano on the "NJ Tea Party" line. They presented the plan at Camden County headquarters during a May 26 meeting of the South Jersey Young Democrats, and some of those present joined in circulating a petition to place DeStefano on the ballot. The Courier-Post also reported that Ayscue actively managed social media accounts on behalf of the DeStefano campaign, according to a Democratic operative with knowledge of the Adler campaign.

==== Polling ====
| Poll | Dates administered | John Adler (D) | Jon Runyan (R) | Peter DeStafano (I) | Undecided |
|---|---|---|---|---|---|
| Monmouth University | October 22–25, 2010 | 43% | 48% | - | 4% |
| Rutgers-Eagleton | October 23–24, 2010 | 46% | 45% | 4% | 6% |
| Stockton/Zogby | October 18–22, 2010 | 37% | 40% | 4.9% | 16% |
| Monmouth University/Gannett New Jersey Press Media | September 24–28, 2010 | 42% | 39% | 4% | 13% |
| Rutgers-Eagleton | September 23–26, 2010 | 44% | 38% | 6% | 12% |
| Stockton/Zogby | September 21–23, 2010 | 38% | 30% | 7.6% | 23% |
| Rutgers University | August 5–8, 2010 | 31% | 25% | 4% | -- |
| Rutgers University | August 5–8, 2010 | 35% | 28% | -- | -- |
| Greenberg Quinlan Rosner Research† | June 27–30, 2010 | 51% | 34% | 12% | -- |

†Internal poll for Adler campaign

==== Predictions ====
| Source | Ranking | As of |
|---|---|---|
| The Cook Political Report | Tossup | November 1, 2010 |
| Rothenberg | Tilt R (flip) | November 1, 2010 |
| Sabato's Crystal Ball | Lean R (flip) | November 1, 2010 |
| RCP | Lean R (flip) | November 1, 2010 |
| CQ Politics | Lean D | October 28, 2010 |
| New York Times | Tossup | November 1, 2010 |
| FiveThirtyEight | Lean R (flip) | November 1, 2010 |

==== Results ====
2010 U.S. House election
| Party | Candidate | Votes | % | ±% |
|---|---|---|---|---|
| Republican | John Runyan | 110,215 | 50.02% | ▲2.10 |
| Democratic | John Adler (incumbent) | 104,252 | 47.32% | ▼4.76 |
| Independent | Peter DeStefano | 3,284 | 1.49% | N/A |
| Libertarian | Russ Conger | 1,445 | 0.66% | N/A |
| Independent | Lawrence Donohue | 1,133 | 0.51% | N/A |
| Total votes | | 220,329 | 100.00% | |
| Republican gain from Democratic | | | | |

==== By county ====
| County | Jon Runyan Republican | | John Adler Democratic | | Various candidates Other parties | | Margin | | Total votes cast |
| County | # | % | # | % | # | % | # | % | Total votes cast |
|---|---|---|---|---|---|---|---|---|---|
| Burlington (part) | 48,888 | 45.1% | 57,585 | 53.1% | 1,989 | 1.9% | -8,697 | -8.0% | 108,462 |
| Camden (part) | 9,584 | 39.2% | 14,464 | 59.2% | 395 | 1.6% | -4,880 | -20.0% | 24,443 |
| Ocean (part) | 51,743 | 59.2% | 32,203 | 36.8% | 3,458 | 4.0% | 19,540 | 22.4% | 87,404 |
| Totals | 110,215 | 50.0% | 104,252 | 47.3% | 5,842 | 2.7% | 5,963 | 2.7% | 220,309 |

== District 4 ==
2010 New Jersey's 4th congressional district election
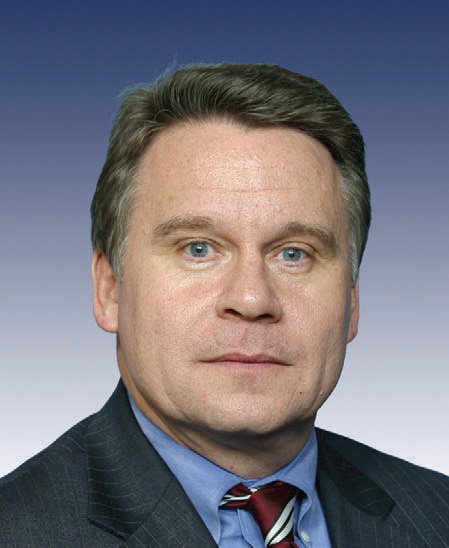

| Nominee | Chris Smith | Howard Kleinhendler |
| Party | Republican | Democratic |
| Popular vote | 129,752 | 52,118 |
| Percentage | 69.41% | 27.88% |
- County results Smith: 50–60% 60–70% 70–80%
U.S. Representative before election
Chris Smith
Republican
Elected U.S. Representative
Chris Smith
Republican

Republican Chris Smith has been in Congress since 1981. In 2008, he won re-election with 66%.

=== Republican primary ===
==== Candidates ====
- Alan Bateman, deputy mayor of Holmdel and nominee for the 12th congressional district in 2008
- Chris Smith, incumbent Representative since 1981

===== Results =====
2010 Republican U.S. House primary
| Party | Candidate | Votes | % |
|---|---|---|---|
| Republican | Chris Smith (incumbent) | 21,723 | 68.83% |
| Republican | Alan Bateman | 9,839 | 30.17% |
| Total votes | | 31,562 | 100.00% |

=== Democratic primary ===
==== Candidates ====
- Howard Kleinhendler, Lakewood attorney and Orthodox Jewish rabbi

==== Results ====
2010 Democratic U.S. House primary
| Party | Candidate | Votes | % |
|---|---|---|---|
| Democratic | Howard Kleinhendler | 7,976 | 100.00% |
| Total votes | | 7,976 | 100.00% |

=== General election ===
==== Candidates ====
- Howard Kleinhendler, Lakewood attorney and Orthodox Jewish rabbi (Democratic)
- David R. Meiswinkle (American Renaissance Movement)
- Joe Siano (Libertarian)
- Chris Smith, incumbent Representative since 1981 (Republican)
- Steven Welzer, nominee for this seat in 2008 (Green)

==== Predictions ====
| Source | Ranking | As of |
|---|---|---|
| The Cook Political Report | Safe R | November 1, 2010 |
| Rothenberg | Safe R | November 1, 2010 |
| Sabato's Crystal Ball | Safe R | November 1, 2010 |
| RCP | Safe R | November 1, 2010 |
| CQ Politics | Safe R | October 28, 2010 |
| New York Times | Safe R | November 1, 2010 |
| FiveThirtyEight | Safe R | November 1, 2010 |

==== Results ====
2010 U.S. House election
| Party | Candidate | Votes | % | ±% |
|---|---|---|---|---|
| Republican | Chris Smith (incumbent) | 129,752 | 69.41% | ▲3.20 |
| Democratic | Howard Kleinhendler | 52,118 | 27.88% | ▼4.75 |
| Libertarian | Joe Siano | 2,912 | 1.56% | N/A |
| Green | Steven Welzer | 1,574 | 0.84% | ▼0.32 |
| Independent | David Meiswinkle | 582 | 0.31% | N/A |
| Total votes | | 186,940 | 100.00% | |
| Republican hold | | | | |

==== By county ====
| County | Chris Smith Republican | | Howard Kleinhendler Democratic | | Various candidates Other parties | | Margin | | Total votes cast |
| County | # | % | # | % | # | % | # | % | Total votes cast |
|---|---|---|---|---|---|---|---|---|---|
| Burlington (part) | 12,189 | 57.1% | 8,629 | 40.5% | 514 | 2.5% | 3,560 | 16.6% | 21,332 |
| Mercer (part) | 25,146 | 61.2% | 14,887 | 36.2% | 1,084 | 2.6% | 10,259 | 25.0% | 41,117 |
| Monmouth (part) | 35,448 | 74.6% | 10,613 | 22.3% | 1,442 | 3.0% | 24,835 | 52.3% | 47,503 |
| Ocean (part) | 56,969 | 74.0% | 17,989 | 23.4% | 2,028 | 2.6% | 39,980 | 50.6% | 76,986 |
| Totals | 129,752 | 69.4% | 52,118 | 27.9% | 5,068 | 2.7% | 77,634 | 41.5% | 186,938 |

== District 5 ==
2010 New Jersey's 5th congressional district election
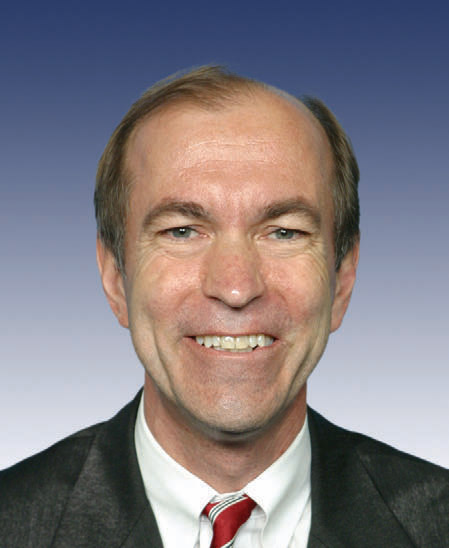

| Nominee | Scott Garrett | Todd Thiese |
| Party | Republican | Democratic |
| Popular vote | 124,030 | 62,634 |
| Percentage | 64.94% | 32.79% |
- County results *: 60–70% 70–80%
U.S. Representative before election
Scott Garrett
Republican
Elected U.S. Representative
Scott Garrett
Republican

Republican Scott Garrett has been in Congress since 2003. In 2008, he won re-election with 56% of the vote.

=== Republican primary ===
==== Candidates ====
- Scott Garrett, incumbent Representative from Wantage since 2003

==== Results ====
2010 Republican U.S. House primary
| Party | Candidate | Votes | % |
|---|---|---|---|
| Republican | Scott Garrett (incumbent) | 29,523 | 100.00% |
| Total votes | | 29,523 | 100.00% |

=== Democratic primary ===
==== Candidates ====
- Anthony N. Iannarelli Jr., Ramsey attorney
- Tod Theise, Washington Township litigation analyst and candidate for Warren County Freeholder in 2009

==== Results ====
2010 Democratic U.S. House primary
| Party | Candidate | Votes | % |
|---|---|---|---|
| Democratic | Tod Theise | 5,711 | 79.44% |
| Democratic | Anthony N. Iannarelli Jr. | 1,478 | 20.56% |
| Total votes | | 7,189 | 100.00% |

=== General election ===
==== Candidates ====
- Ed Fanning, nominee for this seat in 2008 (Green)
- Scott Garrett, incumbent Representative from Wantage since 2003 (Republican)
- James Douglas Radigan (Be Determined)
- Mark D. Quick (For Americans)
- Tod Theise, Washington Township litigation analyst and candidate for Warren County Freeholder in 2009 (Democratic)

==== Predictions ====
| Source | Ranking | As of |
|---|---|---|
| The Cook Political Report | Safe R | November 1, 2010 |
| Rothenberg | Safe R | November 1, 2010 |
| Sabato's Crystal Ball | Safe R | November 1, 2010 |
| RCP | Safe R | November 1, 2010 |
| CQ Politics | Safe R | October 28, 2010 |
| New York Times | Safe R | November 1, 2010 |
| FiveThirtyEight | Safe R | November 1, 2010 |

==== Results ====
2010 U.S. House election
| Party | Candidate | Votes | % | ±% |
|---|---|---|---|---|
| Republican | Scott Garrett (incumbent) | 124,030 | 64.94% | ▲9.07 |
| Democratic | Tod Theise | 62,634 | 32.79% | ▼9.61 |
| Green | Ed Fanning | 2,347 | 1.23% | ▼0.49 |
| Independent | Mark Quick | 1,646 | 0.86% | N/A |
| Independent | James D. Radigan | 336 | 0.18% | N/A |
| Total votes | | 190,993 | 100.0 | |
| Republican hold | | Swing | {{{swing}}} | |

==== By county ====
| County | Scott Garrett Republican | | Tod Thiese Democratic | | Various candidates Other parties | | Margin | | Total votes cast |
| County | # | % | # | % | # | % | # | % | Total votes cast |
|---|---|---|---|---|---|---|---|---|---|
| Bergen (part) | 76,419 | 62.7% | 43,846 | 36.0% | 1,560 | 1.3% | 32,573 | 26.7% | 121,825 |
| Passaic (part) | 10,136 | 65.5% | 5,079 | 32.8% | 265 | 1.7% | 5,057 | 32.7% | 15,480 |
| Sussex (part) | 20,876 | 72.4% | 6,492 | 22.5% | 1,482 | 5.1% | 14,384 | 49.9% | 28,850 |
| Warren | 16,599 | 66.8% | 7,217 | 29.1% | 1,022 | 4.1% | 9,382 | 37.7% | 24,838 |
| Totals | 124,030 | 64.9% | 62,634 | 32.8% | 4,329 | 2.3% | 61,396 | 32.1% | 190,993 |

== District 6 ==
2010 New Jersey's 6th congressional district election
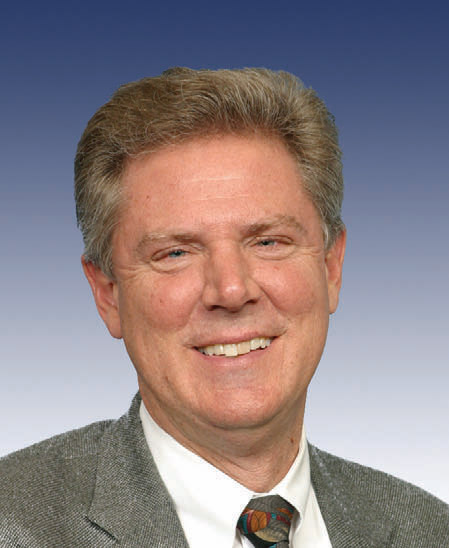

| Nominee | Frank Pallone | Anna Little |
| Party | Democratic | Republican |
| Popular vote | 81,993 | 65,413 |
| Percentage | 54.75% | 43.71% |
- County results Pallone: 50–60% 70–80% 90–100% Little: 50–60%
U.S. Representative before election
Frank Pallone
Democratic
Elected U.S. Representative
Frank Pallone
Democratic

Incumbent Democrat Frank Pallone defeated Republican Challenger and then-mayor of Highlands Anna Little. From 2003 to 2013, this district included portions of Monmouth, Middlesex, Somerset, and Union counties. This is the only time Pallone lost Monmouth County in his career.

=== Democratic primary ===
==== Candidates ====
- Frank Pallone, incumbent Representative from Long Branch since 1988

==== Results ====
2010 Democratic U.S. House primary
| Party | Candidate | Votes | % |
|---|---|---|---|
| Democratic | Frank Pallone (incumbent) | 11,667 | 100.00% |
| Total votes | | 11,667 | 100.00% |

=== Republican primary ===
==== Candidates ====
- Diane Gooch, vice chair of the Monmouth County Republican Party, Red Bank newspaper publisher and wife of GFI Group founder Mickey Gooch
- Anna Little, mayor of Highlands

===== Declined =====
- Mary Pat Angelini, Assemblywoman from Ocean Township

==== Results ====
2010 Republican U.S. House primary
| Party | Candidate | Votes | % |
|---|---|---|---|
| Republican | Anna Little | 6,804 | 50.31% |
| Republican | Diane Gooch | 6,721 | 49.69% |
| Total votes | | 13,525 | 100.00% |

=== General election ===
==== Candidates ====
- Jack Freudenheim (Independent)
- Anna Little, mayor of Highlands (Republican)
- Frank Pallone, incumbent Representative from Long Branch since 1988 (Democratic)
- Karen Anne Zaletel (Green Tea Patriots)

==== Predictions ====
| Source | Ranking | As of |
|---|---|---|
| The Cook Political Report | Likely D | November 1, 2010 |
| Rothenberg | Safe D | November 1, 2010 |
| Sabato's Crystal Ball | Safe D | November 1, 2010 |
| RCP | Likely D | November 1, 2010 |
| CQ Politics | Safe D | October 28, 2010 |
| New York Times | Safe D | November 1, 2010 |
| FiveThirtyEight | Safe D | November 1, 2010 |

==== Results ====
2010 U.S. House election
| Party | Candidate | Votes | % | ±% |
|---|---|---|---|---|
| Democratic | Frank Pallone (incumbent) | 81,933 | 54.75% | ▼12.20 |
| Republican | Anna Little | 65,413 | 43.71% | ▲12.10 |
| Independent | Jack Freudenheim | 1,299 | 0.87% | N/A |
| Independent | Karen Anne Zaletel | 1,017 | 0.68% | N/A |
| Total votes | | 149,662 | 100.0 | |
| Democratic hold | | Swing | {{{swing}}} | |

==== By county ====
| County | Frank Pallone Democratic | | Anna Little Republican | | Various candidates Other parties | | Margin | | Total votes cast |
| County | # | % | # | % | # | % | # | % | Total votes cast |
|---|---|---|---|---|---|---|---|---|---|
| Middlesex (part) | 33,472 | 57.9% | 23,358 | 40.4% | 1,001 | 1.8% | 10,114 | 17.5% | 57,831 |
| Monmouth (part) | 37,019 | 47.0% | 40,529 | 51.5% | 1,174 | 1.5% | -3,510 | -4.5% | 78,722 |
| Somerset (part) | 3,145 | 78.5% | 806 | 20.1% | 55 | 1.4% | 2,339 | 68.4% | 4,006 |
| Union (part) | 8,297 | 91.1% | 720 | 7.9% | 86 | 1.0% | 7,577 | 83.2% | 9,103 |
| Totals | 81,933 | 54.7% | 65,413 | 43.7% | 2,316 | 1.5% | 16,520 | 11.0% | 149,662 |

== District 7 ==
2010 New Jersey's 7th congressional district election
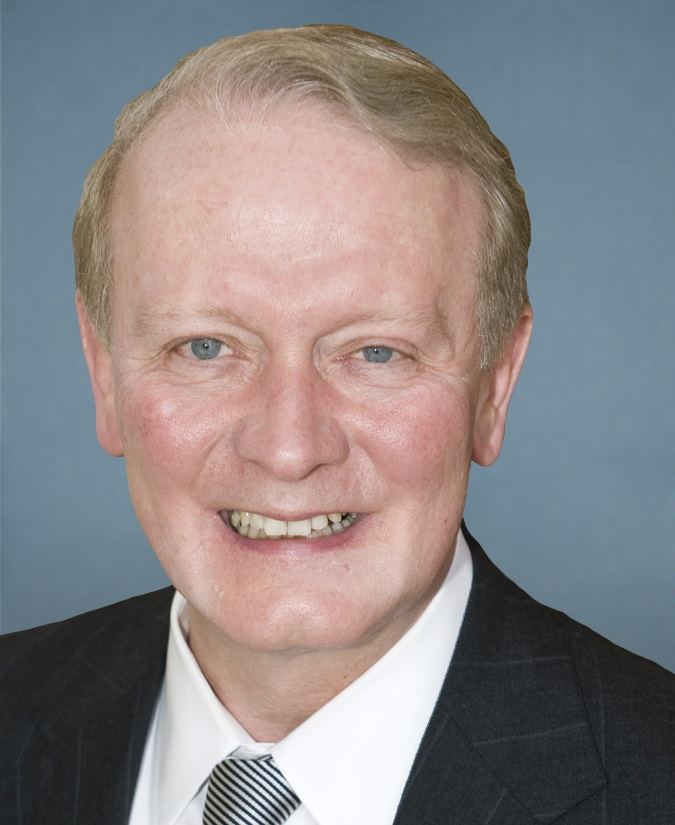

| Nominee | Leonard Lance | Ed Potosnak |
| Party | Republican | Democratic |
| Popular vote | 105,084 | 71,902 |
| Percentage | 59.4% | 40.6% |
- County results *: 50–60% 60–70% 70–80% Potosnak: 50–60%
U.S. Representative before election
Leonard Lance
Republican
Elected U.S. Representative
Leonard Lance
Republican

Incumbent Republican Leonard Lance won re-election against Democratic challenger Ed Potosnak. From 2003 to 2013, this district included portions of Middlesex, Union, Somerset, and Hunterdon counties.

=== Republican primary ===
==== Candidates ====
- Bruce E. Baker
- Alonzo Hosford
- Leonard Lance, incumbent Representative from Clinton since 2009
- David Larsen, Oldwick businessman

==== Results ====
2010 Republican U.S. House primary
| Party | Candidate | Votes | % |
|---|---|---|---|
| Republican | Leonard Lance (incumbent) | 17,200 | 56.10% |
| Republican | David Larsen | 9,475 | 30.91% |
| Republican | Alonzo Hosford | 2,534 | 8.27% |
| Republican | Bruce E. Baker | 1,448 | 4.72% |
| Total votes | | 30,657 | 100.00% |

=== Democratic primary ===
==== Candidates ====
- Ed Potosnak

==== Results ====
2010 Democratic U.S. House primary
| Party | Candidate | Votes | % |
|---|---|---|---|
| Democratic | Ed Potosnak | 8,176 | 100.00% |
| Total votes | | 8,176 | 100.00% |

=== General election ===
==== Candidates ====
- Leonard Lance, incumbent Representative from Clinton since 2009 (Republican)
- Ed Potosnak (Democratic)

==== Predictions ====
| Source | Ranking | As of |
|---|---|---|
| The Cook Political Report | Safe R | November 1, 2010 |
| Rothenberg | Safe R | November 1, 2010 |
| Sabato's Crystal Ball | Safe R | November 1, 2010 |
| RCP | Safe R | November 1, 2010 |
| CQ Politics | Safe R | October 28, 2010 |
| New York Times | Safe R | November 1, 2010 |
| FiveThirtyEight | Safe R | November 1, 2010 |

==== Results ====
2010 U.S. House election
| Party | Candidate | Votes | % | ±% |
|---|---|---|---|---|
| Republican | Leonard Lance (incumbent) | 105,084 | 59.37% | ▲9.15 |
| Democratic | Ed Potosnak | 71,902 | 40.63% | ▼1.59 |
| Total votes | | 176,986 | 100.00% | |
| Republican hold | | Swing | {{{swing}}} | |

==== By county ====
| County | Leonard Lance Republican | | Ed Potosnak Democratic | | Margin | | Total votes cast |
| County | # | % | # | % | # | % | Total votes cast |
|---|---|---|---|---|---|---|---|
| Hunterdon (part) | 22,506 | 70.4% | 9,448 | 29.6% | 13,058 | 40.8% | 31,954 |
| Middlesex (part) | 13,915 | 49.2% | 14,360 | 50.8% | -445 | -1.6% | 28,275 |
| Somerset (part) | 30,514 | 60.9% | 19,583 | 39.1% | 10,931 | 21.8% | 50,097 |
| Union (part) | 38,149 | 57.2% | 28,511 | 42.8% | 9,638 | 14.4% | 66,660 |
| Totals | 105,084 | 59.4% | 71,902 | 40.6% | 33,182 | 18.8% | 176,986 |

== District 8 ==
2010 New Jersey's 8th congressional district election
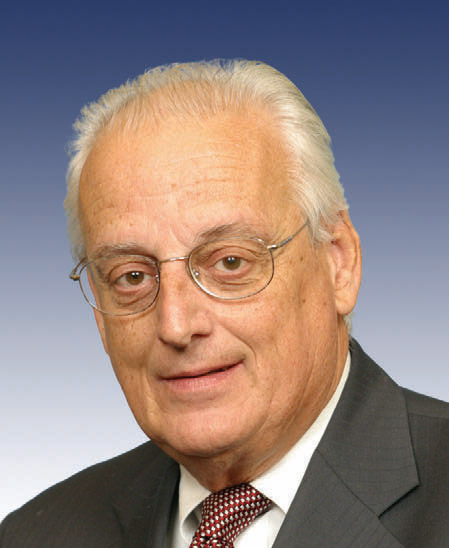

| Nominee | Bill Pascrell | Roland Straten |
| Party | Democratic | Republican |
| Popular vote | 88,478 | 51,023 |
| Percentage | 62.7% | 36.1% |
- County results Pascrell: 60–70%
U.S. Representative before election
Bill Pascrell
Democratic
Elected U.S. Representative
Bill Pascrell
Democratic

Incumbent Democrat Bill Pascrell defeated Republican challenger Roland Straten. From 2003 to 2013, this district included portions of Essex and Passaic counties.

=== Democratic primary ===
==== Candidates ====
- Bill Pascrell, incumbent Representative from Paterson since 1997

==== Results ====
2010 Democratic U.S. House primary
| Party | Candidate | Votes | % |
|---|---|---|---|
| Democratic | Bill Pascrell (incumbent) | 8,176 | 100.00% |
| Total votes | | 8,176 | 100.00% |

=== Republican primary ===
==== Candidates ====
- Blase Billack
- Roland Straten, engineer, U.S. Navy veteran and nominee for this district in 2008

==== Results ====
2010 Republican U.S. House primary
| Party | Candidate | Votes | % |
|---|---|---|---|
| Republican | Roland Straten | 5,739 | 80.15% |
| Republican | Blase Billack | 1,333 | 18.85% |
| Total votes | | 7,072 | 100.00% |

=== General election ===
==== Candidates ====
- Raymond Giangrosso (Independent)
- Bill Pascrell, incumbent Representative from Paterson since 1997 (Democratic)
- Roland Straten, engineer, U.S. Navy veteran and nominee for this district in 2008 (Republican)

==== Predictions ====
| Source | Ranking | As of |
|---|---|---|
| The Cook Political Report | Safe D | November 1, 2010 |
| Rothenberg | Safe D | November 1, 2010 |
| Sabato's Crystal Ball | Safe D | November 1, 2010 |
| RCP | Safe D | November 1, 2010 |
| CQ Politics | Safe D | October 28, 2010 |
| New York Times | Safe D | November 1, 2010 |
| FiveThirtyEight | Safe D | November 1, 2010 |

==== Results ====
2010 U.S. House election
| Party | Candidate | Votes | % | ±% |
|---|---|---|---|---|
| Democratic | Bill Pascrell (incumbent) | 88,478 | 62.66% | ▼8.45 |
| Republican | Roland Straten | 51,023 | 36.13% | ▲7.96 |
| Independent | Raymond Giangrosso | 1,707 | 1.21% | N/A |
| Total votes | | 141,208 | 100.00% | |
| Democratic hold | | | | |

==== By county ====
| County | Bill Pascrell Democratic | | Roland Straten Republican | | Raymond Giangrosso Independent | | Margin | | Total votes cast |
| County | # | % | # | % | # | % | # | % | Total votes cast |
|---|---|---|---|---|---|---|---|---|---|
| Essex (part) | 36,956 | 61.5% | 22,188 | 36.9% | 913 | 1.5% | 14,768 | 24.6% | 60,057 |
| Passaic (part) | 51,522 | 63.5% | 28,835 | 35.5% | 794 | 1.0% | 22,687 | 38.0% | 81,151 |
| Totals | 88,478 | 62.7% | 51,023 | 36.1% | 1,707 | 1.2% | 37,455 | 26.6% | 141,208 |

== District 9 ==
2010 New Jersey's 9th congressional district election
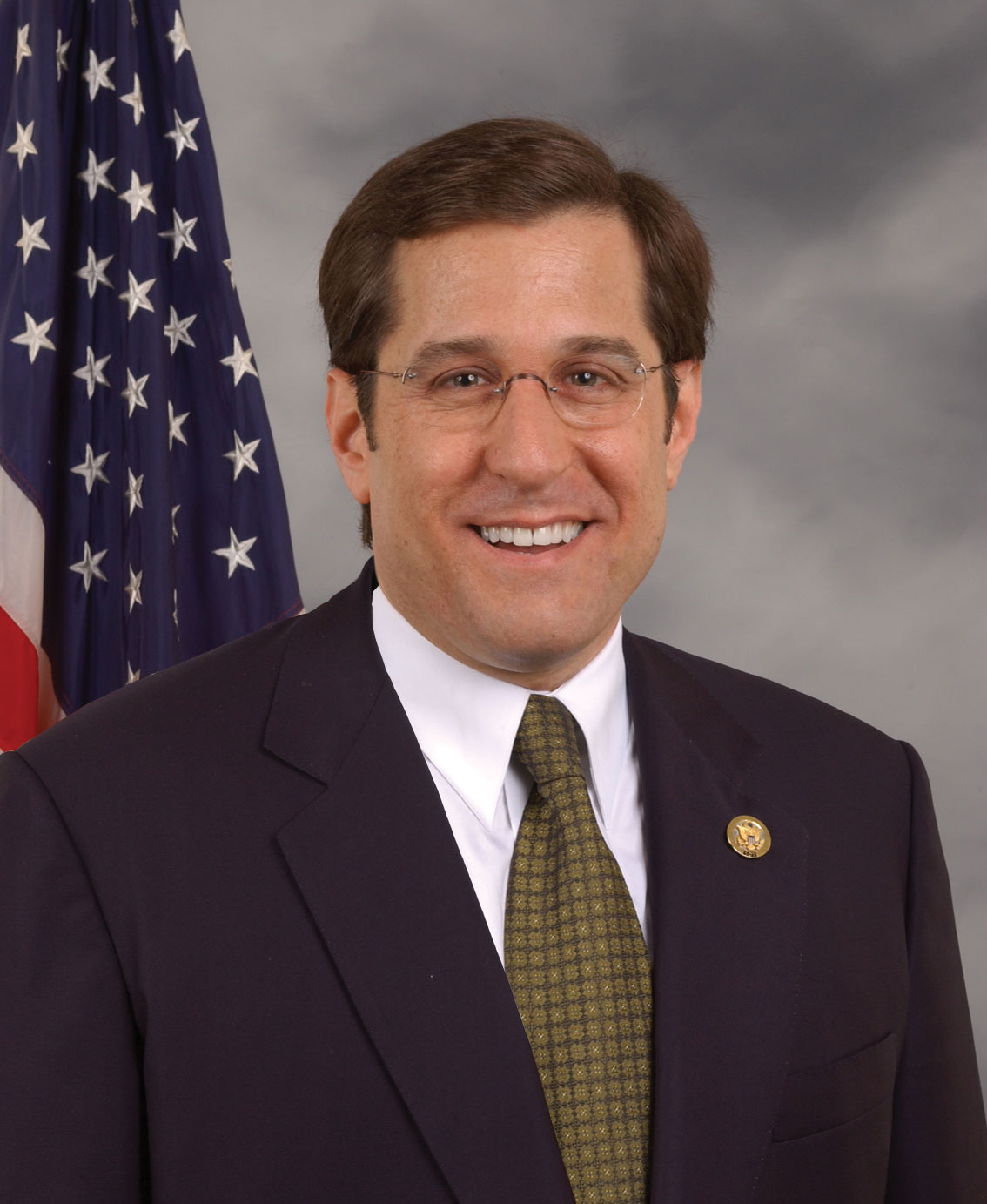

| Nominee | Steve Rothman | Michael Agosta |
| Party | Democratic | Republican |
| Popular vote | 83,564 | 52,082 |
| Percentage | 60.7% | 37.9% |
- County results *: 60–70% Agosta: 50–60%
U.S. Representative before election
Steve Rothman
Democratic
Elected U.S. Representative
Steve Rothman
Democratic

Incumbent Democrat Steve Rothman defeated Republican challenger Michael Agosto. From 2003 to 2013, this district included portions of Hudson, Bergen, and Passaic counties.

=== Democratic primary ===
==== Candidates ====
- Steve Rothman, incumbent Representative from Fair Lawn since 1997

==== Results ====
2010 Democratic U.S. House primary
| Party | Candidate | Votes | % |
|---|---|---|---|
| Democratic | Steve Rothman (incumbent) | 14,973 | 100.00% |
| Total votes | | 14,973 | 100.00% |

=== Republican primary ===
==== Candidates ====
- Michael Agosta
- John Aslanian
- Sergey Shevchuk

==== Results ====
2010 Republican U.S. House primary
| Party | Candidate | Votes | % |
|---|---|---|---|
| Republican | Michael A. Agosta | 5,830 | 58.15% |
| Republican | John Aslanian | 3,629 | 36.20% |
| Republican | Sergey Shevchuk | 567 | 5.66% |
| Total votes | | 10,026 | 100.00% |

=== General election ===
==== Candidates ====
- Michael Agosta (Republican)
- Patricia Alessandrini (Green)
- Steve Rothman, incumbent Representative from Fair Lawn since 1997 (Democratic)

==== Predictions ====
| Source | Ranking | As of |
|---|---|---|
| The Cook Political Report | Safe D | November 1, 2010 |
| Rothenberg | Safe D | November 1, 2010 |
| Sabato's Crystal Ball | Safe D | November 1, 2010 |
| RCP | Safe D | November 1, 2010 |
| CQ Politics | Safe D | October 28, 2010 |
| New York Times | Safe D | November 1, 2010 |
| FiveThirtyEight | Safe D | November 1, 2010 |

==== Results ====
2010 U.S. House election
| Party | Candidate | Votes | % | ±% |
|---|---|---|---|---|
| Democratic | Steve Rothman (incumbent) | 83,564 | 60.75% | ▼6.78 |
| Republican | Michael Agosta | 52,082 | 37.86% | ▲6.82 |
| Green | Patricia Alessandrini | 1,980 | 1.44% | N/A |
| Total votes | | 137,554 | 100.00% | |
| Democratic hold | | Swing | {{{swing}}} | |

==== By county ====
| County | Steve Rothman Democratic | | Michael Agosta Republican | | Patricia Alessandrini Green | | Margin | | Total votes cast |
| County | # | % | # | % | # | % | # | % | Total votes cast |
|---|---|---|---|---|---|---|---|---|---|
| Bergen (part) | 68,739 | 60.4% | 43,573 | 38.3% | 1,418 | 1.2% | 25,166 | 22.1% | 113,730 |
| Hudson (part) | 12,619 | 67.1% | 5,711 | 30.3% | 489 | 2.6% | 6,908 | 36.8% | 18,819 |
| Passaic (part) | 2,206 | 43.5% | 2,798 | 55.1% | 73 | 1.4% | -592 | -11.6% | 5,077 |
| Totals | 83,564 | 60.7% | 52,082 | 37.8% | 1,980 | 1.4% | 31,482 | 22.9% | 137,626 |

== District 10 ==
2010 New Jersey's 10th congressional district election
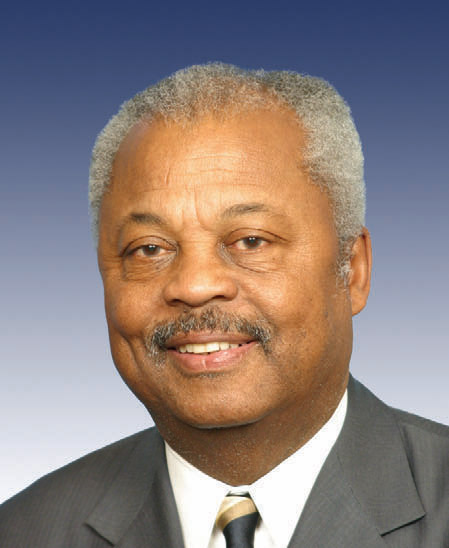

| Nominee | Donald M. Payne | Michael Alonso |
| Party | Democratic | Republican |
| Popular vote | 95,299 | 14,357 |
| Percentage | 85.2% | 12.8% |
- County results *: 70–80% 90–100%
U.S. Representative before election
Donald M. Payne
Democratic
Elected U.S. Representative
Donald M. Payne
Democratic

Incumbent Democrat Donald M. Payne defeated Republican challenger Michael Alonso. From 2003 to 2013, this district included portions of Essex, Hudson, and Union counties. Payne later died on March 6, 2012, halfway through his term.

=== Democratic primary ===
==== Candidates ====
- Donald M. Payne, incumbent Representative from Newark since 1989

==== Results ====
2010 Democratic U.S. House primary
| Party | Candidate | Votes | % |
|---|---|---|---|
| Democratic | Donald M. Payne (incumbent) | 22,155 | 100.00% |
| Total votes | | 22,155 | 100.00% |

=== Republican primary ===
==== Candidates ====
- Michael Alonso

==== Results ====
2010 Republican U.S. House primary
| Party | Candidate | Votes | % |
|---|---|---|---|
| Republican | Michael Alonso | 1,061 | 100.00% |
| Total votes | | 1,061 | 100.00% |

=== General election ===
==== Candidates ====
- Michael Alonso (Republican)
- Joanne Miller (Agent of Change)
- Donald M. Payne, incumbent Representative from Newark since 1989 (Democratic)
- Robert Louis Touissant (Action No Talk)

==== Predictions ====
| Source | Ranking | As of |
|---|---|---|
| The Cook Political Report | Safe D | November 1, 2010 |
| Rothenberg | Safe D | November 1, 2010 |
| Sabato's Crystal Ball | Safe D | November 1, 2010 |
| RCP | Safe D | November 1, 2010 |
| CQ Politics | Safe D | October 28, 2010 |
| New York Times | Safe D | November 1, 2010 |
| FiveThirtyEight | Safe D | November 1, 2010 |

==== Results ====
2010 U.S. House election
| Party | Candidate | Votes | % | ±% |
|---|---|---|---|---|
| Democratic | Donald M. Payne (incumbent) | 95,299 | 85.18% | ▼13.74 |
| Republican | Michael Alonso | 14,357 | 12.83% | N/A |
| Independent | Robert Louis Toussaint | 1,141 | 1.02% | N/A |
| Independent | Joanne Miller | 1,080 | 0.97% | N/A |
| Total votes | | 111,877 | 100.00% | |
| Democratic hold | | Swing | {{{swing}}} | |

==== By county ====
| County | Donald Payne Jr. Democratic | | Michael Alonso Republican | | Various candidates Other parties | | Margin | | Total votes cast |
| County | # | % | # | % | # | % | # | % | Total votes cast |
|---|---|---|---|---|---|---|---|---|---|
| Essex (part) | 60,621 | 92.1% | 4,186 | 6.4% | 1,042 | 1.6% | 56,435 | 85.7% | 65,849 |
| Hudson (part) | 7,390 | 78.3% | 1,614 | 17.1% | 434 | 4.6% | 5,776 | 61.2% | 9,438 |
| Union (part) | 27,288 | 74.6% | 8,557 | 23.4% | 745 | 2.0% | 18,731 | 51.2% | 36,590 |
| Totals | 95,299 | 85.2% | 14,357 | 12.8% | 2,221 | 2.0% | 80,942 | 72.4% | 111,877 |

== District 11 ==
2010 New Jersey's 11th congressional district election
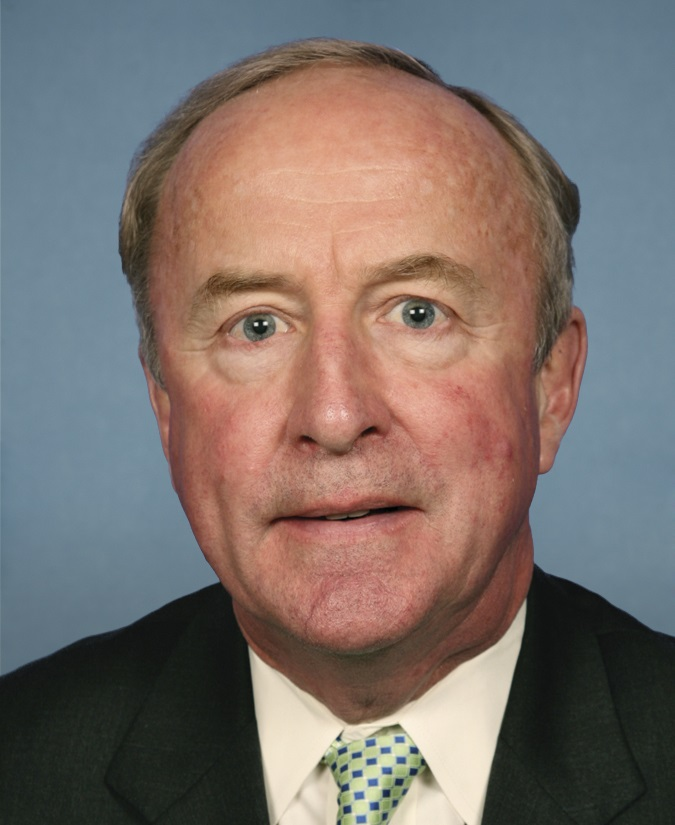

| Nominee | Rodney Frelinghuysen | Douglas Herbert |
| Party | Republican | Democratic |
| Popular vote | 122,149 | 55,472 |
| Percentage | 67.2% | 30.5% |
- County results *: 60–70% 70–80%
U.S. Representative before election
Rodney Frelinghuysen
Republican
Elected U.S. Representative
Rodney Frelinghuysen
Republican

Incumbent Republican Rodney Frelinghuysen defeated Democratic challenger Douglas Herbert. From 2003 to 2013, this district included all of Morris County, as well as portions of Essex, Passaic, Sussex, and Somerset counties.

=== Republican primary ===
==== Candidates ====
- Rodney Frelinghuysen, incumbent Representative from Harding since 1995
- Richard T. Luzzi

==== Results ====
2010 Republican U.S. House primary
| Party | Candidate | Votes | % |
|---|---|---|---|
| Republican | Rodney Frelinghuyen (incumbent) | 32,631 | 76.44% |
| Republican | Richard T. Luzzi | 10,060 | 23.56% |
| Total votes | | 42,691 | 100.00% |

=== Democratic primary ===
==== Candidates ====
- Douglas Herbert
- James D. Kelly Jr.

==== Results ====
2008 Democratic U.S. House primary
| Party | Candidate | Votes | % |
|---|---|---|---|
| Democratic | Douglas Herbert | 6,192 | 71.52% |
| Democratic | James D. Kelly Jr. | 2,466 | 28.48% |
| Total votes | | 8,658 | 100.00% |

=== General election ===
==== Candidates ====
- Rodney Frelinghuysen, incumbent Representative from Harding since 1995 (Republican)
- Jim Gawron (Libertarian)
- Douglas Herbert (Democratic)

==== Predictions ====
| Source | Ranking | As of |
|---|---|---|
| The Cook Political Report | Safe R | November 1, 2010 |
| Rothenberg | Safe R | November 1, 2010 |
| Sabato's Crystal Ball | Safe R | November 1, 2010 |
| RCP | Safe R | November 1, 2010 |
| CQ Politics | Safe R | October 28, 2010 |
| New York Times | Safe R | November 1, 2010 |
| FiveThirtyEight | Safe R | November 1, 2010 |

==== Results ====
2010 U.S. House election
| Party | Candidate | Votes | % | ±% |
|---|---|---|---|---|
| Republican | Rodney Frelinghuysen (incumbent) | 122,149 | 67.19% | ▲5.35 |
| Democratic | Douglas Herbert | 55,472 | 30.51% | ▼6.50 |
| Libertarian | Jim Gawron | 4,179 | 2.30% | N/A |
| Total votes | | 181,800 | 100.00% | |
| Republican hold | | Swing | {{{swing}}} | |

==== By county ====
| County | Rodney Frelinghuysen Republican | | Douglas Herbert Democratic | | Jim Gawron Libertarian | | Margin | | Total votes cast |
| County | # | % | # | % | # | % | # | % | Total votes cast |
|---|---|---|---|---|---|---|---|---|---|
| Essex (part) | 13,238 | 67.3% | 6,110 | 31.1% | 309 | 1.6% | 7,128 | 36.2% | 19,657 |
| Morris | 88,207 | 67.2% | 40,186 | 30.6% | 2,781 | 2.1% | 48,021 | 36.6% | 131,174 |
| Passaic (part) | 722 | 60.6% | 451 | 37.9% | 18 | 1.5% | 271 | 22.7% | 1,191 |
| Somerset (part) | 11,812 | 64.9% | 5,924 | 32.6% | 453 | 2.5% | 5,888 | 32.3% | 18,189 |
| Sussex (part) | 8,170 | 70.5% | 2,801 | 24.2% | 618 | 5.3% | 5,369 | 46.3% | 11,589 |
| Totals | 122,149 | 67.2% | 55,472 | 30.5% | 4,179 | 2.3% | 66,677 | 36.7% | 181,800 |

== District 12 ==
2010 New Jersey's 12th congressional district election
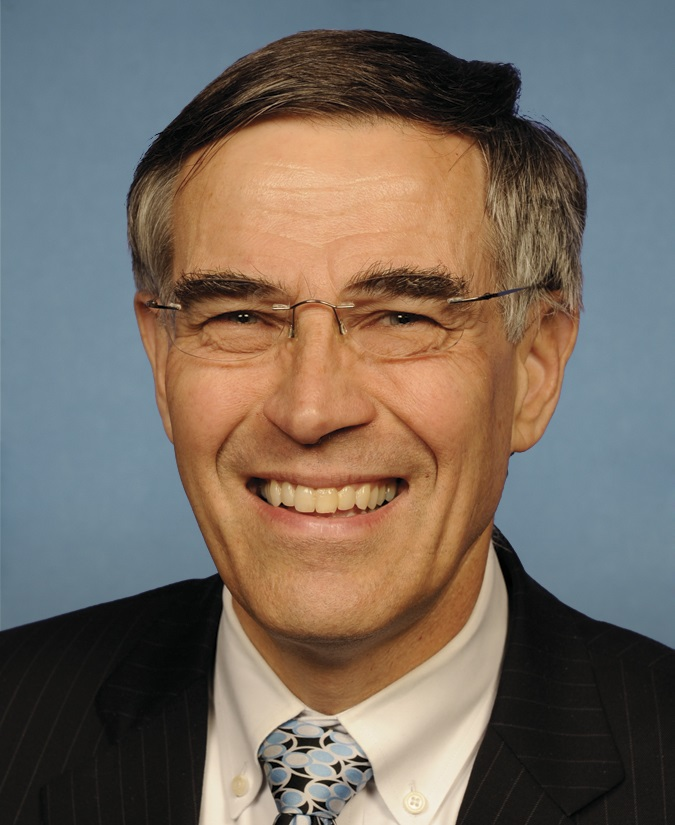

| Nominee | Rush Holt Jr. | Scott Sipprelle |
| Party | Democratic | Republican |
| Popular vote | 108,214 | 93,634 |
| Percentage | 53.0% | 45.9% |
- County results *: 50–60% 60–70% Sipprelle: 50–60% 60–70%
U.S. Representative before election
Rush Holt Jr.
Democratic
Elected U.S. Representative
Rush Holt Jr.
Democratic

Incumbent Democrat Rush Holt Jr. defeated Republican challenger Scott Sipprelle. From 2003 to 2013, this district included portions of Monmouth, Middlesex, Mercer, Somerset, and Hunterdon counties.

=== Democratic primary ===
==== Candidates ====
- Rush Holt Jr., incumbent Representative from Pennington since 1999

==== Results ====
2010 Democratic U.S. House primary
| Party | Candidate | Votes | % |
|---|---|---|---|
| Democratic | Rush Holt Jr. (incumbent) | 14,480 | 100.00% |
| Total votes | | 14,480 | 100.00% |

=== Republican primary ===
==== Candidates ====
- David Corsi, independent candidate for this district in 2008
- Scott M. Sipprelle, Princeton venture capitalist

===== Declined =====
- Alan Bateman, nominee for this district in 2008 (ran in the 4th district)

==== Results ====
2010 Republican U.S. House primary
| Party | Candidate | Votes | % |
|---|---|---|---|
| Republican | Scott M. Sipprelle | 8,927 | 54.12% |
| Republican | David Corsi | 7,569 | 45.88% |
| Total votes | | 16,496 | 100.00% |

=== General election ===
==== Candidates ====
- Kenneth Cody (Truth Vision Hope)
- Rush Holt Jr., incumbent Representative from Pennington since 1999 (Democratic)
- Scott M. Sipprelle, Princeton venture capitalist (Republican)

==== Polling ====
| Poll | Dates administered | Rush Holt (D) | Scott Sipprelle (R) | Undecided |
|---|---|---|---|---|
| National Research | October 27, 2010 | 42% | 43% | - |
| Monmouth University | October 25–27, 2010 | 51% | 43% | 4% |
| Monmouth University | October 9–12, 2010 | 51% | 46% | 3% |

==== Predictions ====
| Source | Ranking | As of |
|---|---|---|
| The Cook Political Report | Likely D | November 1, 2010 |
| Rothenberg | Safe D | November 1, 2010 |
| Sabato's Crystal Ball | Likely D | November 1, 2010 |
| RCP | Lean D | November 1, 2010 |
| CQ Politics | Safe D | October 28, 2010 |
| New York Times | Safe D | November 1, 2010 |
| FiveThirtyEight | Safe D | November 1, 2010 |

==== Results ====
2010 U.S. House election
| Party | Candidate | Votes | % | ±% |
|---|---|---|---|---|
| Democratic | Rush Holt Jr. (incumbent) | 108,214 | 53.05% | ▼10.07 |
| Republican | Scott Sipprelle | 93,634 | 45.90% | ▲10.58 |
| Independent | Kenneth Cody | 2,154 | 1.06% | N/A |
| Total votes | | 204,002 | 100.00% | |
| Democratic hold | | Swing | {{{swing}}} | |

==== By county ====
| County | Rush Holt Democratic | | Scott Sipprelle Republican | | Kenneth Cody Independent | | Margin | | Total votes cast |
| County | # | % | # | % | # | % | # | % | Total votes cast |
|---|---|---|---|---|---|---|---|---|---|
| Hunterdon (part) | 4,250 | 43.1% | 5,486 | 55.6% | 135 | 1.4% | -1,236 | -12.5% | 9,871 |
| Mercer (part) | 39,046 | 69.8% | 16,408 | 29.4% | 449 | 0.8% | 22,638 | 40.4% | 55,903 |
| Middlesex (part) | 37,024 | 51.8% | 33,486 | 46.9% | 916 | 1.3% | 3,538 | 4.9% | 71,426 |
| Monmouth (part) | 20,709 | 37.7% | 33,580 | 61.2% | 581 | 1.1% | -12,871 | -24.5% | 54,870 |
| Somerset (part) | 7,185 | 60.1% | 4,674 | 39.1% | 93 | 0.8% | 2,511 | 21.0% | 11,952 |
| Totals | 108,214 | 53.0% | 93,634 | 45.9% | 2,154 | 1.1% | 14,580 | 7.1% | 204,002 |

== District 13 ==
2010 New Jersey's 13th congressional district election
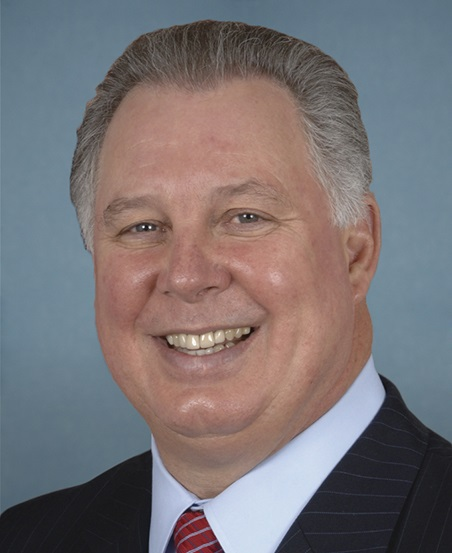

| Nominee | Albio Sires | Henrietta Dwyer |
| Party | Democratic | Republican |
| Popular vote | 62,840 | 19,538 |
| Percentage | 74.1% | 23.0% |
- County results *: 60–70% 70–80% 80–90%
U.S. Representative before election
Albio Sires
Democratic
Elected U.S. Representative
Albio Sires
Democratic

Incumbent Democrat Albio Sires defeated Republican challenger Henrietta Dwyer. From 2003 to 2013, this district included portions of Hudson, Essex, Union, and Middlesex counties. This was the last election before the elimination of this seat in the 2010 census.

=== Democratic primary ===
==== Candidates ====
- Jeff Boss, conspiracy theorist and perennial candidate
- Albio Sires, incumbent Representative from West New York since 2006

==== Results ====
2010 Democratic U.S. House primary
| Party | Candidate | Votes | % |
|---|---|---|---|
| Democratic | Albio Sires (incumbent) | 16,022 | 86.93% |
| Democratic | Jeff Boss | 2,409 | 13.07% |
| Total votes | | 18,431 | 100.00% |

=== Republican primary ===
==== Candidates ====
- Henrietta Dwyer

==== Results ====
2010 Republican U.S. House primary
| Party | Candidate | Votes | % |
|---|---|---|---|
| Republican | Henrietta Dwyer | 2,436 | 100.00% |
| Total votes | | 2,436 | 100.00% |

=== General election ===
==== Candidates ====
- Henrietta Dwyer (Republican)
- Maximo Nacer (Gravity Buoyancy Solution)
- Albio Sires, incumbent Representative from West New York since 2006 (Democratic)
- Anthony Zanowic (Independent American)

==== Predictions ====
| Source | Ranking | As of |
|---|---|---|
| The Cook Political Report | Safe D | November 1, 2010 |
| Rothenberg | Safe D | November 1, 2010 |
| Sabato's Crystal Ball | Safe D | November 1, 2010 |
| RCP | Safe D | November 1, 2010 |
| CQ Politics | Safe D | October 28, 2010 |
| New York Times | Safe D | November 1, 2010 |
| FiveThirtyEight | Safe D | November 1, 2010 |

==== Results ====
2010 U.S. House election
| Party | Candidate | Votes | % | ±% |
|---|---|---|---|---|
| Democratic | Albio Sires (incumbent) | 62,840 | 74.11% | ▼1.25 |
| Republican | Henrietta Dwyer | 19,538 | 23.04% | ▲1.30 |
| Independent | Anthony Zanowic | 1,508 | 1.78% | N/A |
| Independent | Maximo Gomez Nacer | 910 | 1.07% | N/A |
| Total votes | | 84,796 | 100.00% | |
| Democratic hold | | Swing | {{{swing}}} | |

==== By county ====
| County | Albio Sires Democratic | | Henrietta Dwyer Republican | | Various candidates Other parties | | Margin | | Total votes cast |
| County | # | % | # | % | # | % | # | % | Total votes cast |
|---|---|---|---|---|---|---|---|---|---|
| Essex (part) | 8,239 | 85.3% | 1,135 | 11.8% | 284 | 3.0% | 7,104 | 73.5% | 9,658 |
| Hudson (part) | 43,805 | 72.8% | 14,460 | 24.0% | 1,872 | 3.1% | 29,345 | 48.8% | 60,137 |
| Middlesex (part) | 6,877 | 68.2% | 3,056 | 30.3% | 152 | 1.5% | 3,821 | 37.9% | 10,085 |
| Union (part) | 3,919 | 79.7% | 887 | 18.0% | 110 | 2.3% | 3,032 | 71.7% | 4,916 |
| Totals | 62,840 | 74.1% | 19,538 | 23.0% | 2,418 | 2.9% | 43,302 | 51.1% | 84,796 |

| Preceded by 2008 elections | United States House of Representatives elections in New Jersey; 2010 | Succeeded by 2012 elections |
