= David A. Norcross =

American politician (born 1937)

David Norcross

Chair of the New Jersey Republican Party
- In office 1977–1980
- Preceded by: Webster B. Todd
- Succeeded by: Philip D. Kaltenbacher

Personal details
- Born: David A. Norcross; March 30, 1937 (age 89) Camden, New Jersey, U.S.
- Party: Republican
- Children: 2, Spencer K.C. Norcross (b.1966); Victoria L.A. Norcross (b.1972)
- Education: University of Delaware (BA); University of Pennsylvania (LLB)

Military service
- Allegiance: United States
- Branch/service: United States Army
- Years of service: 1962–1965
- Unit: Judge Advocate General's Corps

David A. Norcross (born March 30, 1937) is an American Republican Party politician who ran for United States Senate in 1976 and served as chairman of the New Jersey Republican State Committee.

== Biography ==
Norcross was born in Camden, New Jersey in 1937. He received his B.A. from University of Delaware in 1958 and his LL.B from University of Pennsylvania in 1961. He served in the United States Army in the Judge Advocate General's Corps, stationed in Asmara, Ethiopia from 1962 to 1965.

He was executive assistant to Governor William T. Cahill from 1971 to 1973, when the New Jersey Election Law Enforcement Commission was created. He became the commission's first executive director, serving from 1973 to 1976.

In 1976, Norcross ran as the Republican candidate for United States Senate against the incumbent Harrison A. Williams. A relative unknown, he used his expertise in campaign financing to attack Williams for what he said were unethical fundraising practices. Norcross was soundly defeated, but Williams would later be convicted of bribery and conspiracy in the Abscam scandal.

He was selected by State Senator Raymond Bateman, then the Republican candidate for Governor of New Jersey, to replace Webster B. Todd as chairman of the New Jersey Republican State Committee in 1977.

Norcross also became a member of the Republican National Committee in 1977. He went on to serve in a number of positions for the RNC, including counsel to the chairman (1983–1989) and general counsel (1993–1997).

Norcross was a partner in the Philadelphia-based law and lobbying firm Blank Rome LLP. His dual role as RNC insider and lobbyist came under scrutiny during the 2004 Republican National Convention, for which Norcross served as chairman of the Committee on Arrangements. The New York Times reported that Norcross had been lobbying the Bush administration on behalf of clients like the defense contractor Raytheon, but it acknowledged that there was nothing illegal about Norcross serving in both capacities.

In 2007–2008, Norcross served as co-chair of presidential candidate Mitt Romney's New Jersey campaign. He was also considered a frontrunner to replace Jim Saxton in the House of Representatives until he withdrew his name from consideration. Norcross had been a resident of Moorestown Township, New Jersey.

Norcross served four years as chairman of the Committee on Rules and Order of Business on the Republican National Committee from 2005 to 2009. He is an elected member of the Temporary Committee on Primaries of the RNC.

In 2009, he was elected chairman of the board of governors of the Republican National Lawyers Association. Norcross resides in Alexandria, Virginia.

Party political offices
Preceded by Nelson G. Gross	Republican Nominee for the U.S. Senate (Class 1) from New Jersey; 1976	Succeeded by Millicent Fenwick
Preceded by Webster B. Todd	Chairman of the New Jersey Republican State Committee; 1977–1980	Succeeded by Philip D. Kaltenbacher
