= 1964 United States Senate election in New Jersey =

- November 3, 1964
- Turnout: 88% (▲16pp)
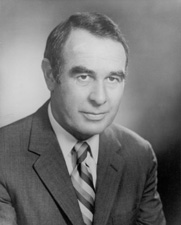

Nominee	Harrison A. Williams	Bernard M. Shanley
Party	Democratic	Republican
Popular vote	1,677,515	1,011,280
Percentage	61.91%	37.32%
- County results Williams: 50–60% 60–70% 70–80% Shanley: 50–60%
U.S. senator before election
Harrison A. Williams
Democratic
Elected U.S. Senator
Harrison A. Williams
Democratic

The 1964 United States Senate election in New Jersey was held on November 3, 1964. Incumbent Democrat Harrison A. Williams defeated Republican nominee Bernard M. Shanley with 61.91% of the vote. Primary elections were held on April 21, 1964. Both candidates were unopposed.

This was the first time since 1888 that Democrats were re-elected to the Senate from New Jersey, and the first since 1856 to this seat. This was the first time Democrats were popularly elected to a second term in the state.

== Democratic primary ==
=== Candidates ===
- Harrison A. Williams, incumbent United States Senator

==== Results ====
Democratic primary results
Party	Candidate	Votes	%
Democratic	Harrison A. Williams (incumbent)	184,972	100.00
Total votes		184,972	100.00

== Republican primary ==
=== Candidates ===
- Bernard M. Shanley, former White House Counsel

==== Results ====
Republican primary results
Party	Candidate	Votes	%
Republican	Bernard M. Shanley	198,747	100.00
Total votes		198,747	100.00

== General election ==
=== Candidates ===
- John V. Mahalchik (Independent)
- Harold P. Poeschel (Independent)
- Albert Ronis (Socialist Labor)
- Bernard M. Shanley, former White House Counsel (Republican)
- Lawrence Stewart (Socialist Workers)
- Harrison A. Williams, incumbent United States Senator (Democratic)

=== Results ===
1964 United States Senate election in New Jersey
Party	Candidate	Votes	%	±%
Democratic	Harrison A. Williams (incumbent)	1,677,515	61.91%	+10.52%
Republican	Bernard M. Shanley	1,011,280	37.32%	−9.58%
Independent	Harold P. Poeschel	7,582	0.28%	N/A
Socialist Workers	Lawrence Stewart	6,147	0.23%	−0.39%
Independent	John V. Mahalchik	4,926	0.18%	N/A
Socialist Labor	Albert Ronis	2,125	0.08%	−0.08%
Majority		666,235	24.59%	
Turnout		2,709,575		
Democratic hold		Swing		

==== Results by county ====
County	Williams votes	Williams %	Stanley votes	Stanley %	Other votes	Other %
Atlantic	42,380	58.8%	29,742	41.2%	0	0.0%
Bergen	207,852	55.5%	164,834	44.0%	2,074	0.6%
Burlington	51,513	62.5%	30,642	37.2%	298	0.3%
Camden	114,567	65.4%	60,048	34.3%	619	0.3%
Cape May	12,152	51.1%	11,525	48.5%	91	0.4%
Cumberland	29,634	67.5%	14,261	32.5%	24	0.01%
Essex	240,797	64.5%	127,951	34.3%	4,452	1.2%
Gloucester	36,504	58.9%	25,418	41.0%	65	0.1%
Hudson	194,672	73.5%	67,278	25.4%	3,089	1.1%
Hunterdon	12,629	52.1%	11,522	47.6%	70	0.4%
Mercer	77,648	68.4%	35,126	30.9%	749	0.7%
Middlesex	140,997	67.5%	66,385	31.8%	1,567	0.7%
Monmouth	84,257	56.5%	64,113	43.0%	723	0.5%
Morris	59,659	48.7%	61,997	50.7%	734	0.5%
Ocean	32,625	53.1%	27,951	45.5%	844	1.3%
Passaic	105,757	60.9%	64,964	37.4%	2,997	1.7%
Salem	16,344	63.9%	9,200	36.0%	32	0.1%
Somerset	37,312	54.6%	30,551	44.7%	426	0.6%
Sussex	12,579	49.7%	12,695	50.2%	36	0.1%
Union	149,615	63.2%	85,373	36.0%	1,847	0.8%
Warren	18,022	64.9%	9,704	34.9%	43	0.2%

Counties that flipped from Republican to Democratic

- Atlantic
- Bergen
- Essex
- Hunterdon
- Monmouth
- Ocean
- Somerset
- Cape May
