= 1976 United States Senate election in New Jersey =

- November 2, 1976
- Turnout: 81% (▲11pp)
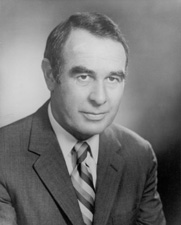

Nominee	Harrison A. Williams	David A. Norcross
Party	Democratic	Republican
Popular vote	1,681,140	1,054,508
Percentage	60.66%	38.05%
- County results Williams: 50–60% 60–70%
U.S. senator before election
Harrison A. Williams
Democratic
Elected U.S. Senator
Harrison A. Williams
Democratic

The 1976 United States Senate election in New Jersey was held on November 2, 1976. Incumbent Democrat Harrison A. Williams defeated Republican nominee David A. Norcross with 60.66% of the vote.

Primary elections were held on June 8, 1976 and were uneventful. Williams easily staved off an anti-abortion campaign from attorney Stephen J. Foley. Norcross cleared a four-man field to win the Republican nomination in a landslide.

== Democratic primary ==
=== Candidates ===
- Stephen J. Foley, Deal attorney and anti-abortion activist
- Harrison A. Williams, incumbent United States Senator

=== Campaign ===
Williams discounted Foley's campaign and referred to him as a single-issue candidate, though he admitted opposition to abortion was "an issue that deserves the most earnest, searching thought". Foley's campaign was managed by future U.S. Representative Chris Smith.

Foley rejected the "single-issue" characterization, saying, "Pro-life is not just antiabortion. It's anything that deals with the human equation, with human problems."

=== Results ===
Democratic primary results
Party	Candidate	Votes	%
Democratic	Harrison A. Williams (incumbent)	378,553	85.12
Democratic	Stephen J. Foley	66,178	14.88
Total votes		444,731	100.00

== Republican primary ==
=== Candidates ===
- David A. Norcross, former executive director of the New Jersey Election Law Enforcement Commission
- James E. Parker, retired sheets metal mechanic and Democratic candidate for U.S. House in 1958 and 1960
- N. Leonard Smith, high school teacher, former member of the Clementon town council, and anti-abortion activist
- Martin E. Wendelken, businessman and candidate for the U.S. House in 1972 and 1974

=== Campaign ===
Norcross held the endorsement of the state party organization, though Martin Wendelken had the support of the Bergen County organization and led a slate of candidates supporting Ronald Reagan's presidential campaign. Wendelken ran a campaign calling for a reduction in the size and scope of government, saying the key issues were unemployment and inflation.

James Parker ran a campaign calling for reduced utility rates. He said that he had switched parties in 1975 after Governor Brendan Byrne vetoed the Tocks Island dam. Leonard Smith said that his campaign was "concerned about the killing of babies... I just can't believe that our country can solve its problems by killing babies."

=== Results ===
Republican primary results
Party	Candidate	Votes	%
Republican	David F. Norcross	196,457	68.34%
Republican	Martin E. Wendelken	45,472	15.82%
Republican	James E. Parker	27,672	9.63%
Republican	N. Leonard Smith	17,892	6.22%
Total votes		287,493	100.00

== General election ==
=== Candidates ===
- Hannibal Cundari (Libertarian)
- Bernardo S. Doganiero, perennial candidate (Socialist Labor)
- Leif O. Johnson (Labor)
- David A. Norcross, former executive director of the New Jersey Election Law Enforcement Commission (Republican)
- Harrison A. Williams, incumbent Senator since 1959 (Democratic)

=== Campaign ===
Despite the state's Republican lean in the presidential race, Williams was the heavy favorite for re-election due to his personal popularity. On a campaign stop in late October, Walter Mondale called Williams "the most popular Senator in Washington."

Norcorss ran on a moderate platform, calling for adjustments to Medicare to ensure "more preventive care and less need for institutionalization" and expanded access to Social Security benefits for high earners. He attempted to appeal to urban voters by calling for tax deductions for mass transit and an expanded loss deduction for small business owners who were victims of crime.

Norcross attempted to use his expert knowledge of campaign finance to attack Williams as a "special interest" legislator engaged in an "odd-couple relationship by wooing both organized labor and banking and securities interests". Norcross singled out fundraising dinners at which Williams accepted donations from representatives of banks and securities firms which appeared before the Senate Subcommittee on Securities, which Williams chaired. "The subcommittee was considering important legislation affecting the securities industry, and the House legislation was considerably watered down when it came up for a Senate vote," Norcross said. "This is not just a campaign-funding issue; it goes to the integrity of the legislature."

However, Norcross never gained traction with the electorate; he failed to raise enough money for radio or television advertising. Even several weeks into the campaign, polls showed that few voters knew his name. When President Gerald Ford visited the Paramus to campaign, he chose to have U.S. Senator Clifford Case on stage rather than Norcross.

=== Results ===
1976 United States Senate election in New Jersey
Party	Candidate	Votes	%	±%
Democratic	Harrison A. Williams (incumbent)	1,681,140	60.66%	▲6.64
Republican	David A. Norcross	1,054,508	38.05%	▼4.11
Libertarian	Hannibal Cundari	19,907	0.72%	N/A
Socialist Labor	Bernardo S. Doganiero	9,185	0.33%	▲0.14
U.S. Labor	Leif O. Johnson	6,650	0.24%	N/A
Majority		626,635		
Turnout		2,771,387		
Democratic hold		Swing		

==== Results by county ====
County	Williams votes	Williams %	Norcross votes	Norcross %	Other votes	Other %
Atlantic	43,769	62.2%	25,500	36.2%	1,152	1.6%
Bergen	226,964	57.3%	163,830	41.4%	5,296	1.3%
Burlington	67,404	57.3%	49,573	42.1%	637	0.5%
Camden	110,639	63.0%	62,876	35.8%	1,996	1.2%
Cape May	17,641	55.7%	13,839	43.7%	190	0.6%
Cumberland	30,578	65.7%	15,761	33.9%	182	0.4%
Essex	194,533	67.8%	87,771	30.6%	4,668	1.6%
Gloucester	45,772	62.6%	26,533	36.3%	762	1.0%
Hudson	132,508	67.4%	61,135	31.1%	2,821	1.4%
Hunterdon	15,520	50.9%	14,782	48.5%	202	0.7%
Mercer	77,959	64.9%	40,883	34.1%	1,220	0.9%
Middlesex	143,452	64.9%	74,841	33.8%	2,909	1.2%
Monmouth	112,687	59.7%	73,979	39.2%	1,946	1.1%
Morris	79,546	50.6%	76,127	48.4%	1,653	1.0%
Ocean	66,317	52.4%	58,525	46.3%	1,651	1.3%
Passaic	88,218	59.7%	56,409	38.2%	3,082	2.1%
Salem	14,853	62.1%	8,847	37.0%	206	0.8%
Somerset	44,665	53.9%	36,740	44.4%	1,392	1.7%
Sussex	19,546	51.3%	18,032	47.4%	488	1.3%
Union	131,033	62.0%	77,404	36.6%	2,971	1.4%
Warren	17,536	60.5%	11,118	38.4%	318	1.1%

Counties that flipped from Republican to Democratic

- Atlantic
- Cape May
- Gloucester
- Hunterdon
- Morris
- Ocean
- Somerset
- Sussex

== Aftermath ==
Although Norcross's attacks on Williams did not stick during the campaign, the Senator was convicted for bribery as part of the 1981 Abscam scandal before his term ended. He resigned from office before a scheduled vote to expel him from the Senate for "ethically repugnant" conduct.

== See also ==
- 1976 United States Senate elections
