= Gary Stein =

American sports announcer (born 1961)

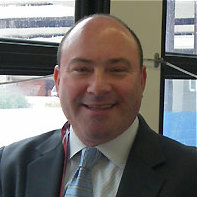
- Gary Stein on ESPN
- Born: October 15, 1961 (age 64); Miami Beach, Florida
- Presenting career
- Show: Baltimore Gameday Uncensored
- Stations: ESPN Radio 1300, 105.7 The Fan, Orioles Radio, Terrapin Sports Radio
- Network: CBS Radio, ESPN Radio
- Show: The Gary Stein Show
- Station: 105.7 The Fan in Baltimore
- Style: Sports
- Country: United States

Gary Stein is a sportscaster currently living in Baltimore, Maryland. He broadcasts for CBS Radio and Terrapin Sports Radio in Baltimore. He hosts the weekly Gary Stein Show, every Saturday on 105.7 the Fan. In addition, he hosts the Maryland Terrapins' Toyota Tailgate pre- and post-game show on ESPN Radio 1300 and Sports Radio 105.7 the Fan. During Ravens home games he serves as the press box public address announcer. Stein also does play-by-play for Baltimore Blast soccer on television, the radio, and webcasts. He has worked Blast games worldwide on Fox Soccer Channel, as well as locally on Maryland Public Television and WMAR TV. Stein serves as the play-by-play broadcaster for UMBC Retrievers basketball and lacrosse on the Retrievers Radio Network. Stein has worked as the sports anchor for The Ed Norris Show, which airs on 105.7 The Fan in Baltimore. While working on The Kirk and Mark Show (prior to The Ed Norris Show) Stein was given the nickname "The Hairy Back of Sports". Additionally, Stein also works for the NFL as the press box PA announcer at the Super Bowl. He has worked all Super Bowls from Super Bowl XXXIX through the most recent game, Super Bowl XLVII in New Orleans.

== Personal life ==
Stein was born in Miami Beach, Florida, and earned a degree in Mass Communications from Towson University. He currently resides in Baltimore with his family.
