= Harrison A. Williams =

American politician (1919–2001)

Pete Williams
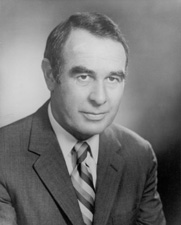
- Williams in 1979

United States Senator from New Jersey
- In office January 3, 1959 – March 11, 1982
- Preceded by: H. Alexander Smith
- Succeeded by: Nicholas F. Brady
Senate positions
Chair of the Senate Labor and Human Resources Committee
In office January 3, 1971 – January 3, 1981
Preceded by	Ralph Yarborough
Succeeded by	Orrin Hatch

Member of the U.S. House of Representatives from New Jersey's 6th district
- In office November 3, 1953 – January 3, 1957
- Preceded by: Clifford P. Case
- Succeeded by: Florence Dwyer

Personal details
- Born: Harrison Arlington Williams Jr. December 10, 1919 Plainfield, New Jersey, U.S.
- Died: November 17, 2001 (aged 81) Denville, New Jersey, U.S.
- Party: Democratic
- Spouse(s): Nancy McGlone (divorced); Jeanette Smith
- Children: 4
- Education: Oberlin College (BA); Georgetown University; Columbia University (LLB)

Military service
- Allegiance: United States
- Branch/service: United States Navy
- Years of service: 1941–1945
- Rank: Lieutenant
- Unit: United States Navy Reserve
- Battles/wars: World War II

Harrison Arlington "Pete" Williams Jr. (December 10, 1919 – November 17, 2001) was an American lawyer and Democratic Party politician who represented New Jersey in the United States House of Representatives (1953–1957) and the United States Senate (1959–1982). As senator, Williams was instrumental in passing the Employee Retirement Income Security Act, the Federal Coal Mine Health and Safety Act, and legislation creating the Occupational Safety and Health Administration. He was also the namesake of the Williams Act, regulating tender offers of public corporations, and a force behind the Urban Mass Transportation Act of 1964.

In 1981, Williams was convicted of accepting bribes in the Abscam scandal. He resigned from the Senate in 1982 before a planned vote on his expulsion.

== Life and career ==
Williams was born in Plainfield, New Jersey, the son of Harrison Arlington Williams and Isabel Lamson, and graduated from Oberlin College in 1941. He engaged in newspaper work in Washington, D.C., and studied at the Edmund A. Walsh School of Foreign Service of Georgetown University until mandated to active duty as a seaman in the United States Naval Reserve in 1941. He became a naval aviator and was discharged as a lieutenant, junior grade, in 1945. After being employed by the steel industry for a brief time, he graduated from Columbia Law School in 1948, and was admitted to the bar and commenced practice in New Hampshire. He returned to Plainfield in 1949 and continued to practice law, and was an unsuccessful candidate for the New Jersey General Assembly in 1951 and for city councilman in 1952.

=== Congressional service ===
Williams was elected to the House of Representatives by a special election in 1953, and was re-elected in 1954 but defeated for re-election in 1956. He was elected to the Senate in 1958 and re-elected in 1964, 1970, and 1976, defeating Republican David A. Norcross.

He became the first Democratic senator in the history of New Jersey ever to be elected four times. Known familiarly as "Pete," Williams fought for a range of social welfare laws and urban transit programs. He was instrumental in passage of such major laws as the Employee Retirement Income Security Act, which protects worker pensions, and the Federal Coal Mine Health and Safety Act.

He also helped pass legislation that created the Occupational Safety and Health Administration and had a major role in passage of the Urban Mass Transportation Act of 1964, the first federal law to provide mass transportation assistance to states and cities. He also was the chairman of the United States Senate Special Committee on Aging from 1967 through 1971.

Williams was the sponsor of the 1968 Williams Act (named after him), which regulates tender offers.

=== Abscam conviction and resignation ===
In 1981, Williams, a resident of Westfield, New Jersey, at the time, was convicted of bribery and conspiracy in the Abscam scandal for taking bribes in a sting operation by the Federal Bureau of Investigation (FBI). The Senate Committee on Ethics recommended that Williams be expelled because of his "ethically repugnant" behavior. Prior to a Senate vote on his expulsion, Williams resigned on March 11, 1982. Sentenced to three years, he served two years in federal prison as Inmate #06089-050, the first time in more than 80 years that a senator had spent time in prison. Williams was also fined $50,000. Released on January 31, 1986, he served the remainder of his sentence at a halfway house, where he later became a member of the board of directors until his death. He also attempted to receive a presidential pardon from President Bill Clinton, but his request was denied.

The Metropark train station had been renamed Harrison A. Williams Metropark Station in 1979, in recognition of his assistance for its construction. However, the name was eliminated from the station after his conviction.

== Death ==
Williams died of cancer and heart ailments at St. Clare's Hospital in Denville, New Jersey, on November 17, 2001, at age 81. He was a resident of Bedminster Township, New Jersey.

== See also ==
- List of American federal politicians convicted of crimes
- List of federal political scandals in the United States
- List of United States senators expelled or censured

U.S. House of Representatives
Preceded by Clifford Case	Member of the U.S. House of Representatives from New Jersey's 6th congressional district 1953–1957	Succeeded by Florence Dwyer
Party political offices
Preceded by Archibald Alexander	Democratic nominee for U.S. Senator from New Jersey (Class 1); 1958, 1964, 1970, 1976	Succeeded by Frank Lautenberg
U.S. Senate
Preceded by Howard Smith	U.S. Senator (Class 1) from New Jersey; 1959–1982; Served alongside: Clifford Case, Bill Bradley	Succeeded by Nicholas Brady
Preceded by George Smathers	Chair of the Senate Aging Committee; 1967–1971	Succeeded by Frank Church
Preceded by Ralph Yarborough	Chair of the Senate Labor Committee; 1971–1981	Succeeded by Orrin Hatch
Preceded by Jake Garn	Ranking Member of the Senate Banking Committee; 1981–1982	Succeeded by Donald Riegle
