= 2018 United States Senate election in New Jersey =

- November 6, 2018
- Turnout: 56% (▼11pp)
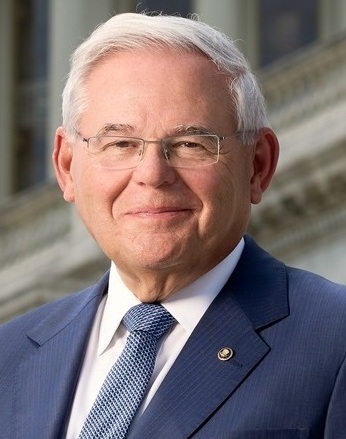

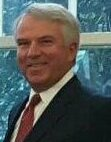
Nominee	Bob Menendez	Bob Hugin
Party	Democratic	Republican
Popular vote	1,711,654	1,357,355
Percentage	54.01%	42.83%
- Menendez: 40–50% 50–60% 60–70% 70–80% 80–90% >90% Hugin: 40–50% 50–60% 60–70% 70–80% 80–90% Tie: 40–50% No votes
U.S. senator before election
Bob Menendez
Democratic
Elected U.S. Senator
Bob Menendez
Democratic

The 2018 United States Senate election in New Jersey took place on November 6, 2018, in order to elect a member of the United States Senate to represent the state of New Jersey. Incumbent Democratic U.S. Senator Bob Menendez won election to a third term over Republican businessman Bob Hugin, after the former's criminal trial ended in a mistrial.

The candidate filing deadline for Democratic and Republican candidates was April 2, 2018, and the primary election was held on June 5, 2018. The deadline for independent candidates was June 5, 2018. Despite the race being rated as a tossup by some political pundits, including The Cook Political Report, Menendez was reelected by an 11.2% margin. However, Hugin was the first Republican Senate candidate to carry Atlantic and Gloucester counties since 1972, and the first Republican to do so in this seat since 1970.

Menendez was later convicted of separate federal corruption charges in 2024 and resigned from the Senate.

== Democratic primary ==
While he never lost support from any major New Jersey officials, after a mistrial was declared in Senator Menendez's corruption trial, party figures across New Jersey lined up with public endorsements of his reelection bid, including the "full support" of Governor Phil Murphy. He formally declared his intention to run for reelection on March 28, 2018, alongside Governor Murphy and Senator Cory Booker.

=== Candidates ===
==== Nominee ====
- Bob Menendez, incumbent U.S. senator

==== Eliminated in primary ====
- Lisa McCormick, activist and candidate for Union County Clerk in 2010

==== Withdrew ====
- Michael Starr Hopkins, attorney

==== Declined ====
- Rush D. Holt Jr., former U.S. representative
- Donald Norcross, U.S. representative
- Mikie Sherrill, retired Navy helicopter pilot and former federal prosecutor (running for NJ-11)
- Robert Torricelli, former U.S. senator

=== Results ===
Results by county Map legend: Menendez—70–80%; Menendez—60–70%; Menendez—50–60%; McCormick—50–60%; McCormick—60–70%

Democratic primary results
Party	Candidate	Votes	%
Democratic	Bob Menendez (incumbent)	262,477	62.28%
Democratic	Lisa McCormick	158,998	37.72%
Total votes		421,475	100%

== Republican primary ==
Bob Hugin launched his primary campaign on February 13 in Springfield. He began advertising on television two weeks later, attacking Menendez on the airwaves, and was soon considered the presumptive nominee. His opponent, Brian Goldberg, attempted to connect himself to President Donald Trump and his supporters by inserting the president's abbreviated slogan, "MAGA", into his ballot slogans and aligning himself with other pro-Trump, anti-establishment candidates. Goldberg also attacked Hugin's running mates, urging Republicans to write in the deceased Charlton Heston in primary races where a Republican congressional candidate was running unopposed. Ultimately, Hugin won overwhelmingly with a majority of votes in each of the state's 21 counties.

=== Candidates ===
==== Nominee ====
- Bob Hugin, businessman and former executive chairman of Celgene Corporation

==== Eliminated in primary ====
- Brian D. Goldberg, businessman and candidate for the U.S. Senate in 2014

==== Withdrew ====
- Rich Pezzullo, businessman (endorsed Bob Hugin, running for NJ-6)
- Hirsh Singh, aerospace engineer and candidate for governor in 2017 (running for NJ-2)
- Dana Wefer, former chairwoman of the Hoboken Housing Authority and candidate for governor in 2017 (did not submit enough petition signatures)

==== Declined ====
- Jon Bramnick, Minority Leader of the New Jersey General Assembly (endorsed Hugin)
- Jack Ciattarelli, former state assemblyman and candidate for governor in 2017
- Michael J. Doherty, state senator
- Kim Guadagno, former lieutenant governor and nominee for governor in 2017
- Thomas Kean Jr., Minority Leader of the New Jersey Senate and nominee for the U.S. Senate in 2006
- Joe Kyrillos, former state senator and nominee for the U.S. Senate in 2012
- Tom MacArthur, U.S. representative (endorsed Hugin)
- Bill Spadea, radio and TV show host; nominee for NJ-12 in 2004
- Jerry Watson
- Jay Webber, state assemblyman and former chairman of the New Jersey Republican State Committee (running for NJ-11)

=== Endorsements ===
Bob Hugin

U.S. executive branch officials

- Donald Trump, president of the United States

Governors

- Tom Kean, former governor of New Jersey
- Christine Todd Whitman, former governor of New Jersey

Lieutenant governors

- Kim Guadagno, former lieutenant governor of New Jersey and nominee for governor in 2017

U.S. representatives

- Mike Ferguson, NJ-7 (former)
- Jenniffer González, Resident Commissioner of Puerto Rico
- Leonard Lance, NJ-7
- Tom MacArthur, NJ-3

NJ state legislators

- Jose Arango, former state assemblyman, chairman of the Hudson County Republican Party
- Jon Bramnick, state assemblyman and assembly minority leader
- Anthony Bucco, state senator
- Tony Bucco, state assemblyman
- Michael Patrick Carroll, state assemblyman
- Kristin Corrado, state senator
- BettyLou DeCroce, state assemblywoman
- Tom Kean Jr., state senator and senate Minority Leader
- Nancy Munoz, state assemblywoman
- Steve Oroho, state senator
- Holly Schepisi, state assemblywoman
- Parker Space, state assemblyman
- Harold J. Wirths, state assemblyman

Sheriffs

- James Gannon, Morris County

Mayors

- Carlos Rendo, mayor of Woodcliff Lake and nominee for lieutenant governor of New Jersey in 2017
- Doug Steinhardt, former mayor of Lopatcong Township and Chairman of the New Jersey Republican State Committee

Others

- Rolando Bobadilla, former Essex County Democratic freeholder
- Mark Dunec, 2014 Democratic nominee for New Jersey's 11th congressional district
- Jim Fozman, Brick councilman (Democrat)
- Tony Frato, Branchville mayor (Democrat)
- Bob Frazier, former Linden city councilman
- Richard Gerbounka, former Linden mayor
- Joe Harvanik, former Linden city councilman
- Richard Pezzullo, businessman and former candidate for U.S. Senate
- Teddy Price, candidate for Ocean County freeholder (Democrat)
- Richard Rutkowski, former Bayonne mayor (Democrat)
- Demetrius Terry, former executive vice president of the College Democrats of New Jersey
- Donald Trump Jr., businessman and son of U.S. President Donald Trump
- Lydia Valencia, president of the Puerto Rican Congress of New Jersey
- Mike Voll, former Middle Township mayor (Democrat)
- Jennifer Williams, first openly transgender delegate at the Republican National Convention

Organizations

- Latino Leadership Alliance of New Jersey

Newspapers

- Burlington County Times
- New York Post

=== Results ===
Results by county Map legend: Hugin—80–90%; Hugin—70–80%; Hugin—60–70%; Hugin—50–60%

Republican primary results
Party	Candidate	Votes	%
Republican	Bob Hugin	168,052	75.13%
Republican	Brian Goldberg	55,624	24.87%
Total votes		223,676	100%

== Libertarian Party ==
=== Candidates ===
- Murray Sabrin, Ramapo College finance professor, Anisfield School of Business

=== Endorsements ===
Murray Sabrin

U.S. representatives

- Ron Paul, former Congressman, presidential candidate in 2008 and 2012

== Green Party ==
- Madelyn R. Hoffman, peace activist and 1997 Green Party gubernatorial candidate

== Independents ==
=== Candidates ===
- Tricia Flanagan (New Day NJ), consultant
- Kevin Kimple (Make it Simple), small business owner
- Natalie Rivera (For the People), social services coordinator
- Hank Schroeder (Economic Growth), perennial candidate

==== Withdrew ====
- Muhammad Usman

== General election ==
=== Debates ===
- Complete video of debate, October 24, 2018

=== Fundraising ===
Campaign finance reports as of October 17, 2018
Candidate (party)	Total receipts	Total disbursements	Cash on hand
Bob Hugin (R)	$30,289,561	$27,714,323	$2,575,238
Bob Menendez (D)	$11,631,183	$11,225,693	$1,832,385
Source: Federal Election Commission

=== Predictions ===
Source	Ranking	As of
The Cook Political Report	Tossup	October 26, 2018
Inside Elections	Likely D	November 1, 2018
Sabato's Crystal Ball	Likely D	November 5, 2018
CNN	Lean D	October 1, 2018
RealClearPolitics	Lean D	October 3, 2018
Fox News	Lean D	October 30, 2018

^Highest rating given

=== Polling ===
Poll source	Date(s) administered	Sample size	Margin of error	Bob Menendez (D)	Bob Hugin (R)	Murray Sabrin (L)	Other	Undecided
Change Research	November 2–4, 2018	1,006	–	51%	41%	–	–	–
Quinnipiac University	October 29 – November 4, 2018	1,115	± 4.0%	55%	40%	–	1%	4%
Stockton University	October 25–31, 2018	598	± 4.0%	51%	39%	3%	4%	1%
Vox Populi Polling	October 27–29, 2018	814	± 3.4%	54%	46%	–	–	–
Emerson College	October 24–26, 2018	659	± 4.0%	47%	42%	–	4%	7%
Rutgers-Eagleton	October 12–19, 2018	496 LV	± 5.1%	51%	46%	–	1%	2%
Rutgers-Eagleton	October 12–19, 2018	896 RV	± 3.8%	48%	45%	–	1%	5%
Quinnipiac University	October 10–16, 2018	873	± 4.3%	51%	44%	–	0%	5%
Monmouth University	October 11–15, 2018	527	± 4.3%	49%	40%	1%	2%	8%
National Research Inc. (R-Hugin)	October 6–9, 2018	600	± 4.0%	42%	40%	–	–	–
YouGov	October 2–5, 2018	845	–	49%	39%	–	4%	8%
Quinnipiac University	September 25 – October 2, 2018	1,058	± 4.1%	53%	42%	–	0%	5%
Vox Populi Polling	September 29 – October 1, 2018	794	± 3.5%	52%	48%	–	–	–
Fairleigh Dickinson University	September 26–30, 2018	508 LV	± 4.3%	43%	37%	–	1%	19%
Fairleigh Dickinson University	September 26–30, 2018	746 RV	± 3.9%	37%	32%	–	1%	29%
Stockton University	September 19–27, 2018	531	± 4.3%	45%	43%	3%	5%	2%
Quinnipiac University	August 15–20, 2018	908	± 4.6%	43%	37%	–	2%	16%
Gravis Marketing (L-Sabrin)	August 14–15, 2018	753	± 3.6%	40%	30%	7%	–	22%
Gravis Marketing	July 6–10, 2018	563	± 4.1%	43%	41%	–	–	16%
Fairleigh Dickinson University	May 16–21, 2018	856	± 3.5%	28%	24%	–	1%	46%
Monmouth University	April 6–10, 2018	632	± 3.9%	53%	32%	–	7%	7%
Quinnipiac University	March 8–12, 2018	1,052	± 4.2%	49%	32%	–	1%	15%

Hypothetical polling

Kean vs. Andrews

Poll source	Date(s) administered	Sample size	Margin of error	Rob Andrews (D)	Thomas Kean (R)	Undecided
Harper Polling	March 24–25, 2013	760	± 3.6%	17%	33%	50%

Codey vs. Kyrillos

Poll source	Date(s) administered	Sample size	Margin of error	Richard Codey (D)	Joe Kyrillos (R)	Undecided
Harper Polling	March 24–25, 2013	760	± 3.6%	34%	25%	41%

=== Results ===
United States Senate election in New Jersey, 2018
Party	Candidate	Votes	%	±%
Democratic	Bob Menendez (incumbent)	1,711,654	54.01%	−4.86%
Republican	Bob Hugin	1,357,355	42.83%	+3.46%
Green	Madelyn Hoffman	25,150	0.79%	+0.32%
Libertarian	Murray Sabrin	21,212	0.67%	+0.17%
Independent	Natalie Rivera	19,897	0.63%	N/A
Independent	Tricia Flanagan	16,101	0.51%	N/A
Independent	Kevin Kimple	9,087	0.29%	N/A
Independent	Hank Schroeder	8,854	0.28%	N/A
Total votes		3,169,310	100%	N/A
Democratic hold				

==== By county ====
County	Bob Menendez December		Bob Hugin Republican		Various candidates Other parties		Margin		Total votes cast
County	#	%	#	%	#	%	#	%	Total votes cast
Atlantic	44,617	47.43%	45,954	48.85%	3,502	3.72%	-1,337	-1.42%	94,073
Bergen	188,235	54.69%	146,406	42.54%	9,542	2.77%	41,829	12.15%	344,183
Burlington	98,749	52.78%	82,240	43.96%	6,111	3.27%	16,509	8.82%	187,100
Camden	113,137	61.82%	63,279	34.58%	6,600	3.61%	49,858	27.24%	183,016
Cape May	14,555	35.78%	24,823	61.03%	1,299	3.19%	-10,268	-25.25%	40,677
Cumberland	19,386	48.29%	19,244	47.93%	1,517	3.78%	142	0.36%	40,147
Essex	194,068	76.52%	53,537	21.11%	6,028	2.38%	140,531	55.41%	253,633
Gloucester	52,203	46.36%	56,090	49.81%	4,309	3.83%	-3,887	-3.45%	112,602
Hudson	132,180	76.35%	36,087	20.84%	4,863	2.81%	96,093	55.51%	173,130
Hunterdon	24,823	39.32%	36,116	57.21%	2,195	3.48%	-11,293	-17.89%	63,134
Mercer	80,773	63.71%	41,225	32.52%	4,785	3.77%	39,548	31.19%	126,783
Middlesex	148,806	58.21%	98,764	38.64%	8,051	3.15%	50,042	19.57%	255,621
Monmouth	112,383	42.99%	140,628	53.79%	8,408	3.22%	-28,245	-10.80%	261,419
Morris	93,763	43.60%	114,783	53.38%	6,492	3.02%	-21,020	-9.78%	215,038
Ocean	75,597	33.72%	141,902	63.29%	6,723	3.00%	-66,305	-29.57%	224,222
Passaic	86,242	57.75%	58,382	39.10%	4,700	3.15%	27,860	18.65%	149,324
Salem	9,060	38.04%	13,687	57.47%	1,068	4.485%	-4,627	-19.43%	23,815
Somerset	70,359	51.67%	61,373	45.07%	4,450	3.27%	8,986	6.60%	136,182
Sussex	20,229	33.23%	37,720	61.96%	2,926	4.81%	-17,491	-28.73%	60,875
Union	117,937	64.22%	60,758	33.09%	4,938	2.69%	57,179	31.13%	183,633
Warren	14,452	35.59%	24,357	59.99%	1,794	4.42%	-9,905	-24.40%	97,103
Totals	1,711,654	54.01%	1,357,355	42.83%	100,301	3.16%	354,299	11.18%	3,169,310

Counties that flipped from Democratic to Republican

- Atlantic (largest municipality: Egg Harbor Township)
- Gloucester (largest municipality: Washington Township)
- Salem (largest municipality: Pennsville Township)

==== By congressional district ====
Menendez won six of 12 congressional districts. Hugin, however, won the remaining six, including five that elected Democrats.

District	Menendez	Hugin	Representative
1st	58%	38%	Donald Norcross
2nd	43%	53%	Jeff Van Drew
3rd	44%	52%	Andy Kim
4th	41%	56%	Chris Smith
5th	47%	50%	Josh Gottheimer
6th	56%	41%	Frank Pallone
7th	46%	51%	Tom Malinowski
8th	77%	20%	Albio Sires
9th	64%	33%	Bill Pascrell
10th	85%	12%	Donald Payne Jr.
11th	47%	50%	Mikie Sherrill
12th	63%	34%	Bonnie Watson Coleman
