= New Jersey Republican State Committee Chairmen =

Chairman of the New Jersey Republican State Committee:

- 1880–1891: Garret Augustus Hobart
- 1891–1892: John Kean
- 1892–1904: Franklin Murphy
- 1904–1907: Frank Obadiah Briggs
- 1907–1910: Franklin Murphy
- 1910–1913: Frank Obadiah Briggs
- 1913–1919: Newton Albert Kendall Bugbee
- 1919–1927: Edward C. Stokes
- 1927–1934: Elias Bertram Mott
- 1934–1935: E. Donald Sterner
- 1935–1937: Henry W. Jeffers
- 1937–1941: Clayton E. Freeman
- 1941–1943: Howard Alexander Smith
- 1943–1949: Lloyd B. Marsh
- 1949–1953: John J. Dickerson
- 1953–1958: Samuel L. Bodine
- 1958–1961: Charles R. Erdman, Jr.
- 1961–1969: Webster B. Todd
- 1969–1970: Nelson G. Gross
- 1970–1973: John E. Dimon
- 1973: John J. Spoltore
- 1974–1976: Webster B. Todd
- 1977–1980: David A. Norcross
- 1981–1985: Philip D. Kaltenbacher
- 1985–1987: Frank B. Holman
- 1987–1989: Bob Franks
- 1989–1990: Kathleen Donovan
- 1990–1992: Bob Franks
- 1992–1995: Virginia Littell
- 1995–2001: Chuck Haytaian
- 2001–2004: Joseph M. Kyrillos
- 2004–2009: Tom Wilson
- 2009–2011: Jay Webber
- 2011–2017: Sam Raia
- 2017–2017: Michael B. Lavery
- 2017–2020: Doug Steinhardt
- 2020–2021: Michael B. Lavery
- 2021-2025: Bob Hugin
- 2025: Glenn Paulsen
- 2026-present: Christine Hanlon
