= Dawn Fantasia =

American politician

Member of the New Jersey General Assembly from the 24th district
- Incumbent
- Assumed office January 9, 2024 Serving with Mike Inganamort
- Preceded by: Parker Space; Hal Wirths

Personal details
- Born: January 2, 1974 (age 52)
- Party: Republican
- Education: Davis and Elkins College (BA); Rutgers University, New Brunswick (attended); Capella University (MS)
- Website: State Assembly website

Dawn Fantasia (born January 2, 1974) is an American Republican Party politician serving as a member of the New Jersey General Assembly for the 24th legislative district, having taken office on January 9, 2024. She also works as the principal of Bergen Arts and Science Charter School in Garfield, New Jersey.

== Biography ==
A resident of Sussex County for 30 years, Fantasia was raised in Ogdensburg and graduated from Wallkill Valley Regional High School before moving to Franklin Borough in 2011 where she currently resides. She graduated from Davis and Elkins College in West Virginia with a bachelor's degree in education. She would also later take classes at the Center for Effective School Practices at Rutgers University, New Brunswick, before earning a master's degree in educational leadership from Capella University. She has three children and is a single mother.

== Elective office ==
Fantasia started serving in public office in Franklin Borough in 2014 as a member of the planning board, zoning board and economic development committee. She then served on the Franklin Borough council for three years, including one year as council president. She was elected to the Sussex County Board of County Commissioners in 2018.

Fantasia ran for the New Jersey General Assembly in 2023 after incumbents Parker Space and Hal Wirths announced their retirements. Space would later change his mind on retirement from the legislature and run for the district's State Senate seat after incumbent Steve Oroho, also the Republican Minority Leader in the State Senate, announced late that he would retire. In the primary election in June 2023, Fantasia and Chester Borough Mayor Mike Inganamort ran together with the endorsements of Oroho, Space and Wirths and defeated Jason Sarnoski, a Warren County Commissioner, and Josh Aikens, the President of the Lafayette Township School District Board of Education (who ran together) as well as 2022 candidate for New Jersey's 11th congressional district Rob Kovic.

Fantasia and Inganamort easily defeated Democrat Alicia Sharma and independent Veronica Fernandez in the general election on November 7 in the solidly Republican district. She became the first woman to represent the 24th legislative district since Assemblywoman Gail Phoebus left office in January 2018 and was also the only new Republican woman elected to the Assembly in 2023 after seven (Claire Swift, Bethanne McCarthy-Patrick, Beth Sawyer, Kimberly Eulner, Marilyn Piperno, Vicky Flynn and Michele Matsikoudis) were elected in the previous Assembly election in 2021.

=== Committee assignments ===
Committee assignments for the 2024—2025 Legislative Session are:

- Commerce, Economic Development and Agriculture
- Education
- Aging and Human Services

=== District 24 ===
Each of the 40 districts in the New Jersey Legislature has one representative in the New Jersey Senate and two members in the New Jersey General Assembly. The representatives from the 24th District for the 2024—2025 Legislative Session are:

- Senator Parker Space (R)
- Assemblyman Dawn Fantasia (R)
- Assemblyman Mike Inganamort (R)

== Electoral history ==
24th Legislative District General Election, 2023
Party	Candidate	Votes	%
Republican	Dawn Fantasia	31,994	36.0
Republican	Mike Inganamort	31,174	35.0
Democratic	Alicia Sharm	18,722	21.0
End The Corruption!	Veronica Fernandez	7,184	8.1
Total votes		89,074	100.0
Republican hold			
Republican hold			
