= Mike Inganamort =

American politician from New Jersey

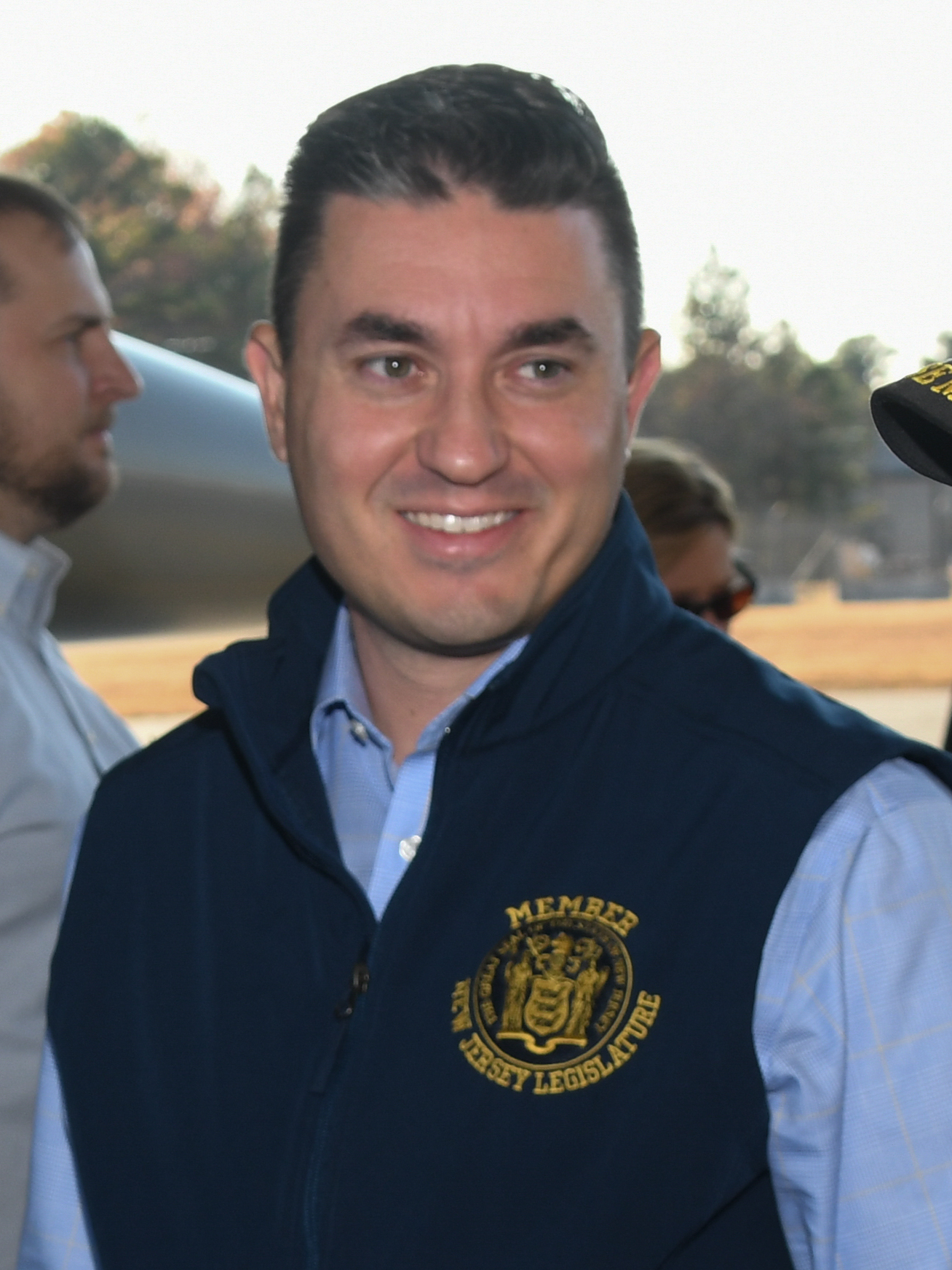

Member of the New Jersey General Assembly from the 24th district
- Incumbent
- Assumed office January 9, 2024 Serving with Dawn Fantasia
- Preceded by: Parker Space; Hal Wirths

Personal details
- Born: February 14, 1984 (age 42)
- Party: Republican
- Education: American University (BA); Georgetown University (MA)
- Website: State Assembly website

Michael Inganamort (born February 14, 1984) is an American Republican Party politician serving as a member of the New Jersey General Assembly for the 24th legislative district, having taken office on January 9, 2024.

== Biography ==
A resident of Chester Township, New Jersey, Inganamort grew up in Sparta, New Jersey, graduated from Sparta High School, earned his undergraduate degree from American University and was awarded a graduate degree from Georgetown University. He was a staff member to Congressman Scott Garrett and works as a consultant.

== Elective office ==
He served on the Chester Township Council from 2018 to 2023 and was the township's mayor in 2023 and 2024.

With Republican incumbent Assembly member Parker Space running for the State Senate seat vacated by Steve Oroho and the retirement of Hal Wirths, Inganamort and Dawn Fantasia of the Sussex County Board of County Commissioners ran together in the primary with the support of their two predecessors and were chosen to run for the two Assembly seats. Inganamort and Fantasia defeated Democrat Baramadai "Alicia" Sharma and independent candidate Veronica Fernandez in the 2023 New Jersey General Assembly election. Inganamort was one of 27 members elected for the first time in 2023 to serve in the General Assembly, more than one-third of the seats.

=== Committee assignments ===
Committee assignments for the 2024—2025 Legislative Session are:

- Environment, Natural Resources, and Solid Waste
- Oversight, Reform and Federal Relations
- Transportation and Independent Authorities

=== District 24 ===
Each of the 40 districts in the New Jersey Legislature has one representative in the New Jersey Senate and two members in the New Jersey General Assembly. The representatives from the 24th District for the 2024—2025 Legislative Session are:

- Senator Parker Space (R)
- Assemblyman Dawn Fantasia (R)
- Assemblyman Mike Inganamort (R)

== Electoral history ==
24th Legislative District General Election, 2023
Party	Candidate	Votes	%
Republican	Dawn Fantasia	31,994	36.0
Republican	Mike Inganamort	31,174	35.0
Democratic	Alicia Sharm	18,722	21.0
End The Corruption!	Veronica Fernandez	7,184	8.1
Total votes		89,074	100.0
Republican hold			
Republican hold			
