= Sussex County Board of County Commissioners =

Leadership
- Director: Chris Carney (R) since January 3, 2019
- Deputy Director: Herbert Yardley (R) since January 1, 2018

Structure
- Seats: 5
- Political groups: Republican Party (5)
- Length of term: 3 years

Website
- Sussex County Freeholders

The Sussex County Board of County Commissioners is a body of five people, called commissioners that govern Sussex County, New Jersey. They are elected at large by popular vote. The last democrat to serve on the board was Howard Burrell who served on the board from 2000 to 2002.

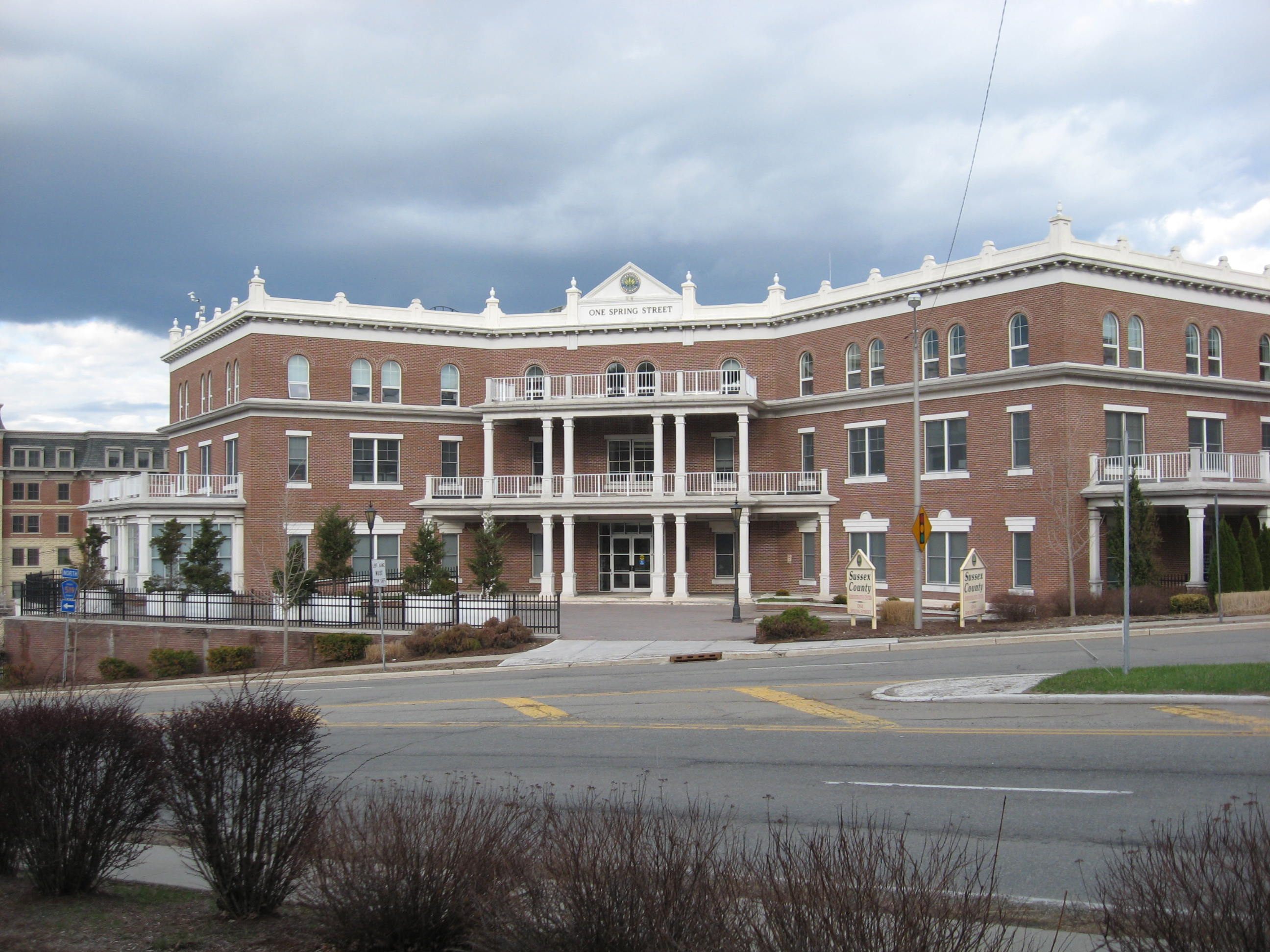
Sussex County Administration Building where the Freeholders meet

The board is the legislative body of Sussex County, New Jersey. They are responsible for the adoption of a budget for the county. The board oversees, and creates policies for the county's Departments of Central and Shared Services, Engineering and Planning, Finance and Library Services, and the Department Health and Human Services. Among those departments they also operate multiple boards, and committees. They also oversee the boards of estimates for Sussex County Technical School, and Sussex County Community College. The board also has the authority over the county's infrastructure. Meetings are held in Newton, New Jersey in the Sussex County Administrative Center. Each year during the reorganization meetings commissioners choose two members from the board to serve as director and deputy director. The current director is Commissioner Herb Yardley, and the current deputy director is Commissioner Sylvia Petillo.

== Sessions ==
=== 2019 ===
In April, the board approved a resolution that would put a question on the ballot asking the Sheriff to ignore the sanctuary state directive sent out by State Attorney General Gurbir Grewal in November 2018. Grewal sent a letter to Sussex County Clerk Jeff Parrott telling him not to put the question on the ballot. Sheriff Mike Strada in turn asked Attorney General William Barr for legal assistance. In July the board hired state Republican Chairman Doug Steinhardt as legal counsel in fighting the state Attorney General.

=== Previous Sessions ===
Year	Seat 1	Seat 2	Seat 3	Seat 4	Seat 5
2002	Howard Burrell (D)	JoAnn D'Angeli (R)	Glen Vetrano (R)	Hal Wirths (R)	Susan M. Zellman (R)
2003	Gary R. Chiusano (R)	JoAnn D'Angeli (R)	Glen Vetrano (R)	Hal Wirths (R)	Susan M. Zellman (R)
2004	Gary R. Chiusano (R)	JoAnn D'Angeli (R)	Glen Vetrano (R)	Hal Wirths (R)	Susan M. Zellman (R)
2005	Gary R. Chiusano (R)	Steve Oroho (R)	Glen Vetrano (R)	Hal Wirths (R)	Susan M. Zellman (R)
2006	Gary R. Chiusano (R)	Steve Oroho (R)	Glen Vetrano (R)	Hal Wirths (R)	Susan M. Zellman (R)
2007	Gary R. Chiusano (R)	Steve Oroho (R)	Glen Vetrano (R)	Hal Wirths (R)	Susan M. Zellman (R)
2008	Gary R. Chiusano (R)	Jeff Parrott (R)	Glen Vetrano (R)	Hal Wirths (R)	Susan M. Zellman (R)
2008	Philip R. Crabb (R) (Note: Appointed to the Board on February 15, 2008)	Jeff Parrott (R)	Glen Vetrano (R)	Hal Wirths (R)	Susan M. Zellman (R)
2009	Philip R. Crabb (R)	Jeff Parrott (R)	Glen Vetrano (R)	Hal Wirths (R)	Susan M. Zellman (R)
2010	Philip R. Crabb (R)	Jeff Parrott (R)	Rich Zeoli (R)	Hal Wirths (R)	Susan M. Zellman (R)
2010	Philip R. Crabb (R)	Jeff Parrott (R)	Rich Zeoli (R)	Parker Space (R) (Note: Appointed to the Board on June 16, 2010) (Note: Appointed to the New Jersey General Assembly on March 21, 2013)	Susan M. Zellman (R)
2011	Philip R. Crabb (R)	Richard Vohden (R)	Rich Zeoli (R)	Parker Space (R)	Susan M. Zellman (R)
2012	Philip R. Crabb (R)	Richard Vohden (R)	Rich Zeoli (R)	Parker Space (R)	Susan M. Zellman (R)
2013	Philip R. Crabb (R)	Richard Vohden (R)	Dennis Mudrick (R)	Parker Space (R)	Gail Phoebus (R)
2013	Philip R. Crabb (R)	Richard Vohden (R)	Dennis Mudrick (R)	George F. Graham (Note: Appointed to the Board on April 12, 2013)	Gail Phoebus (R)
2014	Philip R. Crabb (R)	Richard Vohden (R)	Dennis Mudrick (R)	George F. Graham	Gail Phoebus (R)
2015	Philip R. Crabb (R)	Richard Vohden (R)	Dennis Mudrick (R)	George F. Graham	Gail Phoebus (R)
2016	Philip R. Crabb (R)	Richard Vohden (R)	Carl Lazzaro (R)	George F. Graham	Jonathan Rose (R)
2017	Philip R. Crabb (R)	Sylvia Petillo (R)	Carl Lazzaro (R)	George F. Graham	Jonathan Rose (R)
2018	Herb Yardley (R)	Sylvia Petillo (R)	Carl Lazzaro (R)	George F. Graham	Jonathan Rose (R)
2019	Herb Yardley (R)	Sylvia Petillo (R)	Carl Lazzaro (R)	George F. Graham	Josh Hertzberg (R)
2020	Herb Yardley (R)	Sylvia Petillo (R)	Carl Lazzaro (R)	George F. Graham	Josh Hertzberg (R)
2021	Herb Yardley (R)	Sylvia Petillo (R)	Carl Lazzaro (R)	George F. Graham	Josh Hertzberg (R)
2022	Herb Yardley (R)	Jill Space (Note: Appointed to the Board in May 2022)	Chris Carney	George F. Graham	Dawn Fantasia
2023	Herb Yardley (R)	Jill Space	Chris Carney	William Hayden	Dawn Fantasia
2024	Jack DeGroot	Jill Space	Chris Carney	William Hayden	Alan Henderson
2025	Jack DeGroot	Jill Space	Chris Carney	William Hayden	Alan Henderson

=== Former Members ===
- Alfred Littell , member of the board in 1956 and member of the New Jersey Senate from 1943 to 1953.
- Howard Burrell , elected in 1999 and most recent democrat to serve on the board. Later served as Mayor of Vernon Township from 2020-2024.
- Vic Marotta , on the board from 1988 to 1991 and served as Mayor of Vernon, New Jersey from 2011 to 2015.
- Jeff Parrott , on the board from 2008 to 2010 lost the 2010 primary to current Assemblyman Parker Space, has served as County Clerk since 2011.
- Phil Crabb , served on the board from 2008 to 2017, and later served on the Franklin Borough Council in 2018.
- Jonathan Rose on the board from 2016 to 2018 and lost re-election to Dawn Fantasia in the 2018 republican primary.
- Carl Lazzaro , in office from 2016 to 2018 and lost the 2018 GOP primary to Josh Hertzberg.
