= Parker Space =

Member of the New Jersey General Assembly

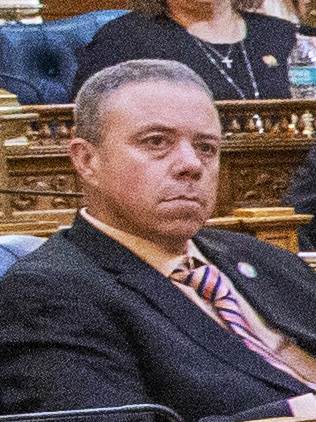

Member of the New Jersey Senate from the 24th district
- Incumbent
- Assumed office January 9, 2024
- Preceded by: Steve Oroho

Member of the New Jersey General Assembly from the 24th district
- In office March 21, 2013 – January 9, 2024 Serving with Alison Littell McHose (2013–2015); Gail Phoebus (2015–2018); Hal Wirths (2018–2024)
- Preceded by: Gary R. Chiusano
- Succeeded by: Dawn Fantasia; Mike Inganamort

Member of the Sussex County Board of Chosen Freeholders
- In office June 6, 2010 – March 21, 2013
- Preceded by: Hal Wirths
- Succeeded by: George F. Graham

Personal details
- Born: December 4, 1968 (age 57) Wantage Township, New Jersey, U.S.
- Party: Republican
- Spouse: Jill Space
- Children: Three
- Website: Legislative Website; Assembly Republican Website

Parker Space (born December 4, 1968) is an American Republican Party politician, and owner of Space Farms Zoo and Museum. Since January 2024, Space represents the 24th Legislative District in the New Jersey Senate. Before his election to the Senate, he represented the 24th District in New Jersey General Assembly starting in March 2013.

== Personal life ==
Space graduated in 1987 from High Point Regional High School.

He is a farmer and restaurant owner who also owns Space Farms Zoo and Museum in the Beemerville section of Wantage Township in Sussex County. He has served with the Wantage Fire Department as a volunteer firefighter since 1989 and the department's chief 2001–2002.

He served on the Wantage Township Committee from 2004 to 2009, was elected as the township's mayor in 2005, 2008 and 2009, and served as deputy mayor in 2006 and 2007.

== Sussex County Board of Chosen Freeholders ==
Space was appointed to the Sussex County Board of Chosen Freeholders in 2010 following the appointment of Hal Wirths to head the New Jersey Department of Labor and Workforce Development. Space won a full three-year term in the 2010 general election and was chosen as Freeholder Director in 2013.

== New Jersey Assembly ==
Space served as freeholder until his appointment to the General Assembly filling a vacancy left by the resignation of Gary R. Chiusano in 2013. Chiusano was appointed to the vacant position of Sussex County Surrogate, and Space was chosen by a convention called of party delegates from municipalities to fill the vacancy per New Jersey state law. Space received 103 of the 158 delegate votes cast, defeating Bader Qarmout, John Wroblewski, and Mark Quick. He was elected to his own full term in November 2013, then again in 2015 and 2017.

== State Senate ==
Space had considered retiring from the Assembly after his term ended in 2024, but decided to run for the New Jersey Senate after Steve Oroho announced his retirement. Space defeated Democrat Edmund Khanoo in the 2023 New Jersey Senate election. Space was one of 10 new senators members elected for the first time in 2023 to serve in the Senate, a quarter of the seats.

=== Committee assignments ===
Committee assignments for the 2024—2025 Legislative Session are:

- Environment and Energy
- Military and Veterans' Affairs

=== District 24 ===
Each of the 40 districts in the New Jersey Legislature has one representative in the New Jersey Senate and two members in the New Jersey General Assembly. The representatives from the 24th District for the 2024—2025 Legislative Session are:

- Senator Parker Space (R)
- Assemblyman Dawn Fantasia (R)
- Assemblyman Mike Inganamort (R)

== Controversies ==
Space was criticized for playing Solitaire on the job during a debate on minimum wages. In a candidate forum in October 2015, Space was quoted as saying: "There is nothing better than an unregistered gun, believe me." In August 2017, Space was criticized for posting a photo of himself and his wife posing in front of a Confederate flag, which was superimposed with a picture of Hank Williams Jr.'s face. The inscription on the flag read: "If the South would've won, we would've had it made."

On August 31, 2017, Space was recorded calling opponent Kate Matteson, saying "[...] And you can put that on the record. She is (an) elitist 1 percenter, an elitist who's a bitch. Gina (Gina Trish, Matteson's running mate), I've never met. I can't say anything bad about her. But Kate, I can. Because I know she's a bitch."

== Electoral history ==
=== Senate ===
24th Legislative District General Election, 2023
Party	Candidate	Votes	%
Republican	F. Parker Space	33,604	64.1
Democratic	Edmund Khanoo	18,821	35.9
Total votes		52,425	100.0
Republican hold			

=== New Jersey Assembly ===
24th legislative district general election, 2021
Party	Candidate	Votes	%
Republican	F. Parker Space (incumbent)	51,198	35.60%
Republican	Harold J. "Hal" Wirths (incumbent)	46,966	32.66%
Democratic	Georgianna Carol Cook	23,436	16.29%
Democratic	Scott P. Fadden	22,224	15.45%
Total votes		143,824	100.0
Republican hold			

24th Legislative District General Election, 2019
Party	Candidate	Votes	%
Republican	Parker Space (incumbent)	30,380	34.78%
Republican	Harold Wirths (incumbent)	28,953	33.15%
Democratic	Deana Lykins	14,704	16.83%
Democratic	Dan Soloman Smith	13,313	15.24%
Total votes		87,350	100%
Republican hold			

New Jersey general election, 2017
Party	Candidate	Votes	%	±%
Republican	Parker Space (Incumbent)	33,873	30.7	▼4.3
Republican	Hal Wirths	30,820	27.9	▼5.4
Democratic	Kate Matteson	22,456	20.3	▲6.4
Democratic	Gina Trish	20,200	18.3	▲4.8
Green	Aaron Hyndman	1,568	1.4	N/A
Green	Kenny Collins	1,518	1.4	▼2.9
Total votes		'110,435'	'100.0'	

New Jersey general election, 2015
Party	Candidate	Votes	%	±%
Republican	Parker Space (Incumbent)	18,058	35.0	▲1.2
Republican	Gail Phoebus	17,217	33.3	▼2.7
Democratic	Jacqueline Stapel	7,165	13.9	▼2.4
Democratic	Michael F. Grace	6,998	13.5	▼0.4
Green	Kenneth Collins	2,227	4.3	N/A
Total votes		'51,665'	'100.0'	

New Jersey general election, 2013
Party	Candidate	Votes	%	±%
Republican	Alison Littell McHose (Incumbent)	37,399	36.0	▲5.4
Republican	Parker Space (Incumbent)	35,093	33.8	▲4.0
Democratic	Susan M. Williams	16,883	16.3	▼0.2
Democratic	William (Bill) Weightman	14,411	13.9	▼1.9
Total votes		'103,786'	'100.0'	

New Jersey Senate
Preceded by Steve Oroho	Member of the New Jersey Senate from the 24th District; January 9, 2024 - Present	Succeeded by Incumbent
New Jersey General Assembly
Preceded by Gary R. Chiusano	Member of the New Jersey General Assembly from the 24th District; March 21, 2013 – January 9, 2024; With: Alison Littell McHose, Gail Phoebus, Hal Wirths	Succeeded by Dawn Fantasia, Mike Inganamort
Political offices
Preceded by Hal Wirths	Member of the Sussex County Board of Chosen Freeholders; June 6, 2010 – March 21, 2013	Succeeded by George F. Graham
