= Wallace R. Wirths =

American politician

Wallace Richard Wirths (July 7, 1921 – July 6, 2002), was an American executive, politician, author, newspaper columnist and radio commentator, who was a benefactor of Upsala College in East Orange, New Jersey.

== Biography ==
Born in Englewood, New Jersey on July 7, 1921, Wirths attended Lehigh University in Bethlehem, Pennsylvania and served in the United States Navy during peacetime. In 1957, Wirths moved to Wantage Township, in Sussex County, in northwestern New Jersey where he became active in local politics. The author of three books, Wirths wrote a column for The New Jersey Herald and was a frequent conservative radio commentator, with his segment "Wally Wirths Candidly Speaking" on WSUS. He was a public relations executive with Westinghouse Corporation until his retirement in 1979.

=== Donation to Upsala College ===
Wirths donated his family's 229-acre farm in Wantage Township to Upsala College in East Orange in 1978 for usage as a second campus. Upsala did not erect any buildings on the property; the only building was a former barn that Wirths converted to offices and a lecture hall. Approximately 300 students were enrolled on the campus in 1992. Declining enrollment and financial difficulties forced the college to close in 1995. The Wirths family bought back the land from the college for $75,000 during the college's bankruptcy and liquidation process.

Wirths received an honorary doctor of law degree from Upsala College.

=== Personal life ===
Wirths died on July 6, 2002, from complications of a stroke he suffered in 1996. He was buried in Clove Cemetery in Wantage.

One of Wirths' four adopted sons is New Jersey politician Hal Wirths, who served in the New Jersey General Assembly from 2018 to 2024 and was the commissioner of the New Jersey Department of Labor and Workforce Development from 2010 to 2016.

== Works ==
- 1985: Democracy: Panacea or Pandemonium
- 1993: Democracy-- The Myth, the Reality: A Primer on the True Nature of Our Democratic Republic
- 1996: The Human Race Stinks: Perspectives of an Iconoclast
