= Michael B. Lavery =

American politician

Chairman of the New Jersey Republican State Committee
- In office June 26, 2017 – November 7, 2017
- Preceded by: Sam Raia
- Succeeded by: Doug Steinhardt
- In office December 15, 2020 – June 10, 2021
- Preceded by: Doug Steinhardt
- Succeeded by: Bob Hugin

Mayor of Hackettstown
- In office 2005–2011
- Preceded by: Roger Hines
- Succeeded by: Maria DiGiovanni

Personal details
- Party: Republican
- Occupation: Lawyer
- Website: www.lsaclaw.com

Michael B. Lavery is an American politician and lawyer who served as the mayor of Hackettstown from 2005 to 2011 and as Chairman of the New Jersey Republican State Committee on two separate occasions. First for six months in 2017 and for a second time between 2020 and 2021.

== Career ==
=== Legal career ===
Before being involved in politics, Lavery worked as a lawyer admitted to the Warren County bar and specialized in commercial litigation, general litigation and municipal litigation for the Lavery, Selvaggi, Abromitis & Cohen law firm which he was a founding partner of.

Following his 2017 term as Chairman of the New Jersey Republican State Committee Lavery became the legal council for the New Jersey Republican State Committee from 2017 to 2020. Following his second exist as chairman he became the Township Attorney for Parsippany–Troy Hills, Hardwick, Lopatcong, Mansfield, Oxford, Greenwich, and Washington.

=== Political career ===
Lavery's political career started in 2005 when he was elected as a Republican to two terms as mayor of Hackettstown serving until 2011. Additionally he worked on the Warren County Republican Committee and was a legislative aid to Leonard Lance He was appointed as the Commissioner for the Delaware River Joint Toll Bridge Commission on June 25, 2015, by governor Chris Christie. On June 26, 2017, he was elected to be the Chairman of the New Jersey Republican State Committee following his endorsement from gubernatorial candidate Kim Guadagno. As chairman he focused entirely on getting Guadagno elected governor and dispelling any criticisms towards her from other Republicans. When Guadagno lost the 2017 New Jersey gubernatorial election, Lavery resigned as chairman. He would be re-elected the chairman on December 15, 2020, following the resignation of his successor Doug Steinhardt after the 2020 election. During this second term he decried election integrity outlining a series of voting reforms he and the New Jersey Republican Committee would like to see implemented in the state. He would be replaced without opposition in 2021 by Bob Hugin, the Republican candidate for the 2018 United States Senate election in New Jersey, at the suggestion of the Republican candidate in the 2021 New Jersey gubernatorial election Jack Ciattarelli.
