= Mayor of Princeton, New Jersey =

Mayor of the City of Princeton
- Incumbent; Mark Freda since January 1, 2021
- Term length: Four years
- First holder: Samuel Bayard
- Website: www.princetonnj.gov

Princeton was founded by Europeans in the latter part of the 17th century. Because of a dispute over school taxes, the municipality split into the Borough of Princeton and Princeton Township in 1894, and both became fully independent municipalities. On January 1, 2013, the two consolidated as Princeton under a borough form of government.

== Princeton ==
=== 1813–1893 ===
Mayors of Princeton, New Jersey:

- 1813-05–1817-12: Samuel Bayard
- 1818-03–1823-02: Ercursion Beatty (died February 1823)
- 1824-01–1829-03: Robert Voorhees (resigned March 1829)
- 1829-03–1838-03: John Lowrey
- 1838-03–1843-11: Col. Alexander McWhorter Cumming (born 23 July 1802, died 16 July 1879; resigned November 1843)
- 1843-11–1844-04: Henry Clow (vacancy)
- 1844-04–1845-01: John Lowrey (died January 1845)
- 1845-01–1845-04: James Vandeventer (vacancy)
- 1845-04–1846-04: Col. Alexander McWhorter Cumming
- 1846-04–1850-04: John T. Robinson
- 1850-04–1851-01: J. I. Dunn (died January 1851)
- 1851-02–1853-04: John Conover
- 1853-04–1854-04: George T. Olmsted
- 1854-04–1855-04: Richard Stockton Cumming (born 29 November 1833, died 18 January 1895)
- 1855-04–1856-04: Augustus S. Martin
- 1856-04–1858-04: Martin Voorhees
- 1858-04–1860-04: Col. Alexander McWhorter Cumming
- 1860-04–1861-04: O. H. Bartine
- 1861-04–1862-04: Alex. M. Hudnut
- 1862-04–1863-04: James T. L. Anderson
- 1863-04–1864-04: Alex. M. Hudnut
- 1864-04–1865-04: Hezekial Mount
- 1865-04–1866-04: Richard Runyon
- 1866-04–1868-04: Alex. M. Hudnut
- 1868-04–1870-04: Eli R. Stonaker
- 1870-04–1871-04: George T. Olmsted
- 1871-04–1872-04: Charles O. Hudnut
- 1872-04–1873-04: George T. Olmsted
- 1873-04–1874-04: LeRoy Anderson (mayor) (resigned 1874)
- 1874-04–1875-04: Richard Runyon (vacancy)
- 1875-04–1877-04: F. S. Conover
- 1877-04–1880-04: Charles S. Robinson (resigned)
- 1880-04–1881-04: William J. Gibby (vacancy)
- 1881-04–1883-04: John F. Hageman, Jr.
- 1883-04–1885-04: William J. Gibby
- 1885-04–1887-04: Josiah W. Wright
- 1887-04–1888-04: Crowell Marsh (resigned)
- 1888-04–1889-04: LeRoy H. Anderson (vacancy)
- 1889-04–1891-04: Richard Stockton Cumming
- 1891-04–1893-04: Augustus MacDonald

=== Since 2013 ===
Mayors of Princeton, New Jersey:

- 2013-01-01–2020-12-31: Liz Lempert
- 2021-01-01–present: Mark Freda

== Princeton Borough (1893–2013) ==
Mayors of Borough of Princeton, New Jersey:

- 1893-04–1897-04: James L. Briner
- 1897-04–1903-04: E. Mulford Updike
- 1903-04–1906-01: H. L. Robinson
- 1906-01–1911-02: H. L. Robinson (died 13 February 1911)
- 1911-02–1916-01: Alexander Hamilton Phillips
- 1916-01–1923-02-06: Charles Browne (born 1875, died 1947; resigned 6 February 1923)
- 1923-02-06–1928-01: E. Mulford Updike
- 1928-01–1930-01: B. Franklin Bunn
- 1930-01–1936-01: Joseph S. Hoff
- 1936-01–1946-01-01: Charles R. Erdman, Jr.
- 1946-01-01–1948-01-01: Minot C. Morgan, Jr.
- 1948-01-01–1950-01-01: Charles Rosenberry Erdman, Jr. (born 1897, died 1984)
- 1950-01-01–1958-01-01: P. MacKay Sturges
- 1958-01-01–1962-01-01: Raymond F. Male
- 1962-01-01–1970-01-01: Henry S. Patterson, II
- 1970-01-01–1984-01-01: Robert W. Cawley
- 1984-01-01–1990-10-10: Barbara Boggs Sigmund (born 1939, died 10 October 1990)
- 1990-11-08–1991-01-01: Marvin R. Reed, succeeded Barbara Boggs Sigmund upon her death, then reelected to three terms on his own.
- 1991-01-01–2004-01-01: Marvin R. Reed
- 2004-01-01–2005-10-21: Joseph P. O'Neill (died 21 October 2005)
- 2005-11-09–2011-01-01: Mildred T. Trotman (born 6 May 1941)
- 2011-01-01–2013-01-01: Yina Moore

== Princeton Township (1893–2013) ==
Mayors of Princeton Township, New Jersey:

- 1900–1911: Moses Taylor Pyne
- 1912: James Margerum
- 1913: Charles McCarthy
- 1914–1915: Reuben Fair
- 1916–1917: Charles McCarthy
- 1918: James Margerum
- 1919–1921: W. E. Dempsey
- 1922–1923: Elwood J. Lawrence
- 1924: Edward L. Howe
- 1925–1930: Theodore Pierson
- 1931–1934: R. Lawrence Benson
- 1935–1940: B. L. Gulick, Jr.
- 1940–1950: B. Franklin Bunn
- 1951–1954: Albert Salzman
- 1955–1956: John H. Wallace, Jr.
- 1956–1957: Ralph S. Maon
- 1958: Charles A. Hurford
- 1959–1963: Kenneth Fairman
- 1964: William L. Wilson
- 1965–1968: Carl C. Schafer, Jr.
- 1969–1970: John D. Wallace
- 1971: James A. Floyd (Twp. clerk seemed uncertain of this)
- 1972: John D. Wallace
- 1973–1976: Junius J. Bleiman
- 1977–1981: Josephine H. Hall
- 1982–1986: Winthrop Pike
- 1986–1987: Gail Firestone
- 1988: Cathleen R. “Kate” Litvak
- 1989: Phyllis L. Marchand
- 1990: Cathleen R. Litvak
- 1991–1992: Richard C. Woodbridge
- 1993: Laurence B. Glasberg
- 1994: Phyllis L. Marchand
- 1995: Michele Lois Tuck
- 1996–1997: Michele Lois Tuck-Ponder
- 1998–2008: Phyllis L. Marchand
- 2009–2010: Bernard P. Miller
- 2011–2013: Chad Goerner
