= Gail Phoebus =

American politician

Member of the New Jersey General Assembly from the 24th Legislative District
- In office December 3, 2015 – January 9, 2018
- Preceded by: Alison Littell McHose
- Succeeded by: Hal Wirths

Member of the Sussex County Board of Chosen Freeholders
- In office January 1, 2013 – December 3, 2015
- Preceded by: Susan M. Zellman
- Succeeded by: Jonathan Rose

Personal details
- Born: January 16, 1950 (age 76)
- Party: Republican
- Spouse: Robert Phoebus
- Website: Legislative Website

Gail Phoebus (born January 16, 1950) is an American Republican Party politician who represented the 24th Legislative District in the New Jersey General Assembly from December 3, 2015, to January 9, 2018.

== Early life ==
A resident of Andover Township, Phoebus received an associate degree from Centenary College (now Centenary University) with a major in retail/ merchandising. She and her husband own the Farmstead Golf and Country Club. In January 1974, she married Robert Phoebus, son of the original owners of the country club in Lafayette Township, New Jersey. Phoebus served on the Andover Township Committee from 2006 to 2012. She was elected to the Sussex County Board of Chosen Freeholders, serving from 2013 to 2015.

== New Jersey Assembly ==
Phoebus was sworn into the Assembly on December 3, 2015, by Vincent Prieto after having been chosen to fill the seat vacated two months earlier by the resignation of Alison Littell McHose.

=== Committees ===
- Appropriations
- Human Services
- Telecommunications and Utilities
- Women and Children

== 2017 State Senate Campaign ==
She opted to run for a second term in 2017 to mount a primary challenge against incumbent state Senator Steve Oroho. She dropped out before the primary.

== Electoral history ==
=== New Jersey Assembly ===
New Jersey general election, 2015
Party	Candidate	Votes	%	±%
Republican	Parker Space (Incumbent)	18,058	35.0	▲1.2
Republican	Gail Phoebus	17,217	33.3	▼2.7
Democratic	Jacqueline Stapel	7,165	13.9	▼2.4
Democratic	Michael F. Grace	6,998	13.5	▼0.4
Green	Kenneth Collins	2,227	4.3	N/A
Total votes		'51,665'	'100.0'	

New Jersey General Assembly
Preceded by Alison Littell McHose	Member of the New Jersey General Assembly from the 24th District; December 3, 2015 – January 9, 2018; With: Parker Space	Succeeded by Hal Wirths
