= Lloyd B. Marsh =

American politician

20th Secretary of State of New Jersey
- In office 1946–1954
- Governor: Walter E. Edge; Alfred E. Driscoll
- Preceded by: Joseph Brophy
- Succeeded by: Edward J. Patten

14th New Jersey Republican State Committee Chairman
- In office 1943–1949
- Preceded by: Howard Alexander Smith
- Succeeded by: John J. Dickerson

Personal details
- Born: July 31, 1893 Little Falls, New Jersey, U.S.
- Died: August 1971 (aged 78)
- Parent(s): James Marsh (father); Emma Coon (mother)
- Education: Clifton High School

Lloyd Bertram Marsh (July 31, 1893 – August 1971) was an American Republican Party politician who served as Secretary of State of New Jersey and Chairman of the New Jersey Republican State Committee.

== Biography ==
Marsh was born in Little Falls, New Jersey in 1893 to James and Emma (Coon) Marsh. After attending Clifton High School, Marsh first worked as an office boy for the Passaic County Clerk. He eventually achieved the position of County Clerk in 1929. He became chairman of the Passaic County Republican Committee in 1937.

In 1943 Marsh managed the campaign of Walter Evans Edge for Governor of New Jersey. When Edge received his party's nomination, Marsh was elected Chairman of the New Jersey Republican State Committee. Edge also appointed Marsh Secretary of State of New Jersey in 1946, a position he continued to serve under Edge's successor, Alfred E. Driscoll, until the end of his term in 1954.

He died in August 1971.

== Legacy ==
Three years after Marsh's death in 1971, he was named as an unindicted co-conspirator in a grand jury indictment of J. Edward Crabiel, then serving as Governor Brendan Byrne's Secretary of State. The indictment charged that Marsh and others had received bribes from paving companies in return for awarding contracts in Paterson and the surrounding Passaic County area.

Political offices
Preceded by Joseph A. Brophy	Secretary of State of New Jersey; 1946 – 1954	Succeeded by Edward J. Patten
Party political offices
Preceded by Howard Alexander Smith	Chairman of the New Jersey Republican State Committee; 1943–1949	Succeeded by John J. Dickerson
