= Bob Hugin =

American businessman and politician

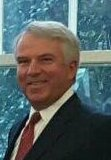

Chair of the New Jersey Republican Party
- In office June 15, 2021 – July 9, 2025
- Preceded by: Michael B. Lavery
- Succeeded by: Glenn Paulsen

Personal details
- Born: Robert John Hugin; July 23, 1954 (age 72) Jersey City, New Jersey, U.S.
- Party: Republican
- Spouse: Kathy Hugin
- Children: 3
- Education: Princeton University (BA); University of Virginia (MBA)

Military service
- Allegiance: United States
- Branch/service: United States Marine Corps
- Years of service: 1976–1983 (active); 1983–1990 (reserve)

Robert John Hugin (born July 23, 1954) is an American businessman who was formerly the executive chairman of Celgene, a biopharmaceutical company. Hugin was the Republican nominee in the 2018 United States Senate election in New Jersey, where he was defeated by incumbent Democratic senator Bob Menendez.

In 2020, he ran for chairman of the New Jersey Republican Party, but was defeated by former Hackettstown mayor Michael Lavery. In 2021, following his victory in the Republican gubernatorial primary, former state assemblyman Jack Ciattarelli endorsed Hugin to lead the state Republican Party. Because the party's gubernatorial nominee traditionally selects the party chair, Hugin replaced Lavery without any opposition.

== Education and military service ==
Hugin grew up in Union City, New Jersey, and attended Emerson High School, graduating in 1972. He was the first in his family to attend college, earning a full-scholarship to Princeton University. He earned a Bachelor of Arts degree from Princeton University in 1976. After graduating, Hugin served in the United States Marine Corps as an active duty infantry officer from 1976 to 1983. In 1985, Hugin earned a master's degree in business administration from the University of Virginia.

At Princeton, Hugin was president of the male-only Tiger Inn, a highly selective private eating club on campus. As president, he opposed the membership of gay men in 1976, stating that a member discovered to be gay "wouldn't last long." Later, as president of the alumni board of Tiger Inn, he led the club's opposition to a 13-year series of lawsuits during the 1980s and 1990s to require the club to admit women, describing the legal campaign to "politically correct fascism”. In 2018, he said that his views on these issues had since changed.

== Career ==
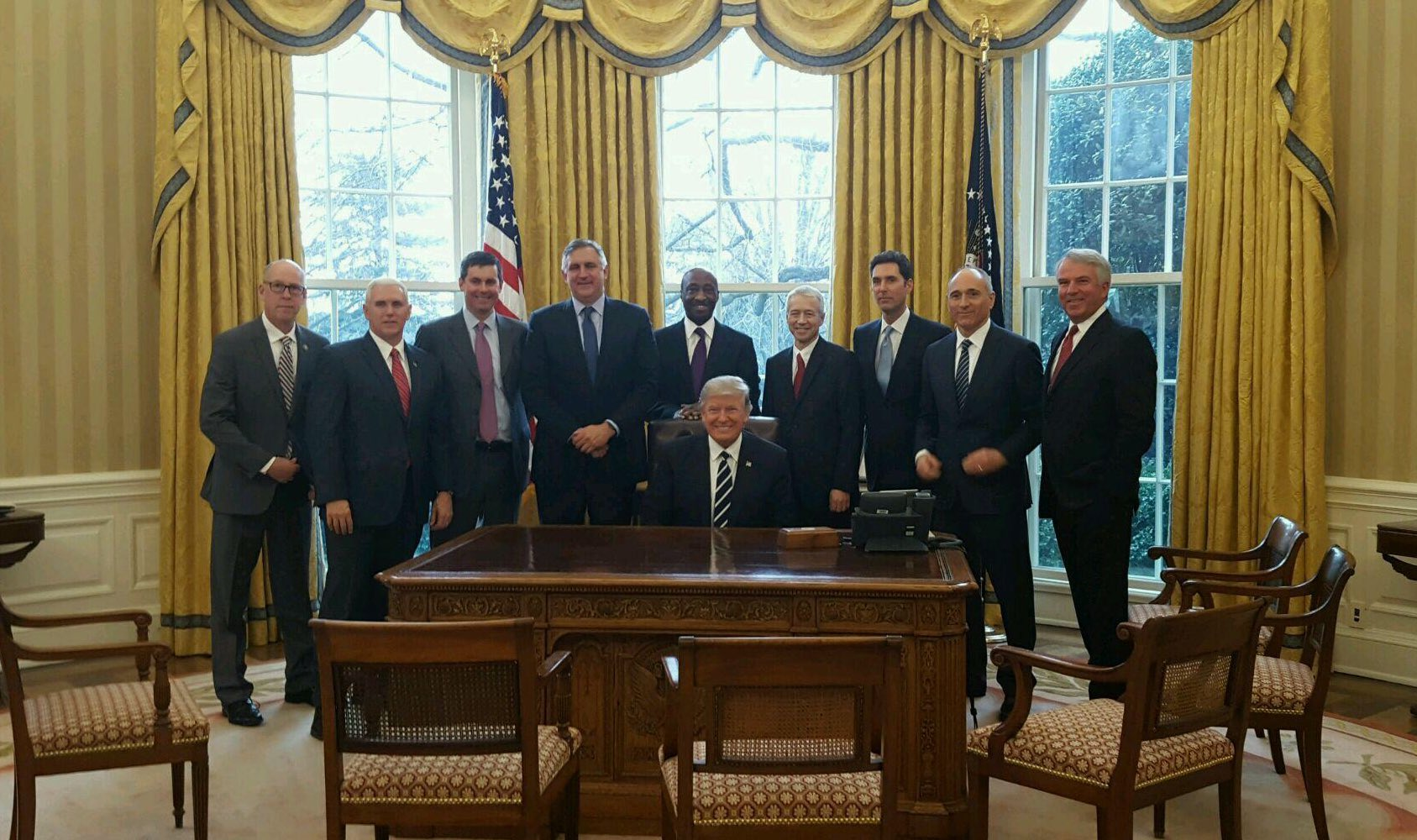
Hugin and other pharmaceutical executives with President Donald Trump in January 2017

From 1985 to 1999, Hugin worked at J.P. Morgan & Co. Inc. and was a managing director.

Hugin has been credited with saving the biotech corporation Celgene and turning it profitable. He joined the company in June 1999 as senior vice president and CFO. At the time, Celgene had approximately 200 employees and less than six weeks of cash. He was elected to Celgene's board of directors in December 2001. Hugin served as Celgene's president and COO since May 2006 and became the CEO of Celgene in June 2010. In June 2011, he was elected chairman of the Celgene board of directors. In his time at Celgene the market capitalization of the company went from $100 million to $70 billion, and headcount grew to 6,000.

During Hugin's tenure, Celgene was reprimanded multiple times by the U.S Food and Drug Administration, including a formal warning letter in 2000 for not sharing all the risks associated with their drugs, and for marketing their drug Thalomid and others to doctors for unapproved uses. In 2017, Celgene was forced to pay $280 million in response to a lawsuit regarding these practices. Hugin has been criticized for drastically raising the prices of several drugs while he was in charge of Celgene. For example, in 2006, the drug Revlimid was introduced to the market and cost about $6,000 for a one-month supply. Celgene was able to actively prevent generic versions of the drug from being sold, and by 2017, the price for the same amount of Revlimid had been raised by Celgene to over $16,000.

In 2013, Hugin was named the best CEO in biotech by TheStreet.com. He left his position at Celgene as chief executive and became an executive chairman in 2017.

== 2018 U.S. Senate election ==
On February 13, 2018, Hugin announced his candidacy for the U.S. Senate seat in New Jersey. In the first quarter of 2018, his campaign raised a little under $8 million, of which $7.5 million was a loan from Hugin himself. He defeated Brian Goldberg in the Republican primary that took place on June 5, 2018, by garnering 75% of the vote, to Goldberg's 24%. President Donald Trump endorsed Hugin via Twitter on Election Day.

On November 6, 2018, Hugin was defeated by incumbent Democrat Bob Menendez.

== Political positions ==
On his 2018 campaign website for the U.S. Senate seat in New Jersey, Hugin described himself as a "different kind of Republican", "moderate" and "independent". On social issues, Hugin is more socially liberal than most Republicans. He advertised his support for legal abortion and gay marriage.

=== Abortion ===
Hugin announced that he is pro-choice on abortion and supports same-sex marriage in a campaign ad. After announcing that he supports legal abortion, Hugin "lost the support of New Jersey Right to Life, the state's largest pro-life group." Hugin opposes late term abortions unless the life of the mother is at risk. He supported the nomination of Supreme Court Justice Neil Gorsuch and has said he would support similarly conservative judicial Supreme Court candidates, causing some to question whether he would be proactive about defending abortion rights.

=== Healthcare ===
Hugin would like to keep parts of the Patient Protection and Affordable Care Act, also known as Obamacare. He would also like to limit out-of-pocket payments including prescription co-payments.

=== Immigration ===
He opposed the Trump administration family separation policy, and announced that he supports a pathway to citizenship for some undocumented immigrants.

=== LGBT rights ===
Hugin used to oppose gay marriage and gay rights, including advocating against extending non-discrimination rights to LGBT students at Princeton. He has since changed his stance and now fully supports the right of LGBT people to get married.

=== Taxes ===
Hugin "calls himself a fiscal conservative opposed to tax increases in a state with the highest property taxes." He supports making individual tax cuts permanent, and also opposes the cap on the state and local tax (SALT) deduction imposed by the Tax Cuts and Jobs Act, saying that it is too low.

=== Donald Trump ===
Hugin supported Donald Trump's presidential candidacy, was the finance chairman of Trump's New Jersey campaign, and donated $100,000 in 2016 to the Trump Victory Fund to help get Trump elected. Hugin also acted as a delegate supporting Trump's nomination at the 2016 Republican National Convention. He has since said that some of Trump's policies are hurting businesses.

== Personal life ==
Bob Hugin is married to Kathy Hugin. They have three children. Hugin is a member of the United Methodist Church. He and his wife earned more than $34 million between 2015 and 2016.

Party political offices
Preceded by Joe Kyrillos	Republican nominee for U.S. Senator from New Jersey (Class 1); 2018	Succeeded by Curtis Bashaw
Preceded by Michael B. Lavery	Chair of the New Jersey Republican Party; 2021–2025	Succeeded by Glenn Paulsen
