= Sam Raia =

American politician

Chairman of the New Jersey Republican Party
- In office January 11, 2011 – June 26, 2017
- Preceded by: Jay Webber
- Succeeded by: Michael B. Lavery

Mayor of Saddle River, New Jersey
- In office January 1, 2008 – December 31, 2015
- Preceded by: Conrad S. Caruso
- Succeeded by: Albert J. Kurpis

Personal details
- Born: Samuel S. Raia; August 25, 1948 Garfield, New Jersey, U.S.
- Died: March 19, 2026 (aged 77)
- Party: Republican
- Education: Seton Hall University (BS); Fairleigh Dickinson University (MBA)

Samuel S. Raia (August 25, 1948 – March 19, 2026) was a Republican Party politician who was the former of Mayor of Saddle River, New Jersey and past Chairman of the New Jersey Republican State Committee.

Raia has served as mayor of Saddle River from 2009 to 2017 and had served on the town council prior to his election. He was a member of the Board of Directors of Hackensack University Medical Center. He became chairman of the New Jersey Republican party in January 2011. He announced his resignation as state chair in January 2014. However, later that month, he decided to continue to serve as chair.

Raia earned a B.S. from Seton Hall University and an M.B.A. from Fairleigh Dickinson University.

Raia died on March 19, 2026 at the age of 77.

Party political offices
Preceded by Jay Webber	Chairman of the New Jersey Republican Party; 2011–2017	Succeeded by Michael B. Lavery
