= Charles R. Erdman Jr. =

American politician

17th New Jersey Republican State Committee Chairman
- In office 1958–1961
- Preceded by: Samuel L. Bodine
- Succeeded by: Webster B. Todd

Mayor of Borough of Princeton, New Jersey
- In office 1948–1950
- Preceded by: Minot C. Morgan, Jr.
- Succeeded by: P. MacKay Sturges
- In office 1936–1946
- Preceded by: Joseph S. Hoff
- Succeeded by: Minot C. Morgan, Jr.

Personal details
- Born: August 25, 1897 Philadelphia, Pennsylvania, U.S.
- Died: October 15, 1984 (aged 87)
- Spouse: Lucy Bulkley (m. 1922)
- Parent(s): Charles R. Erdman, Sr. (father); Estelle P. Pardee (mother)
- Education: Lawrenceville School; Princeton University(B.A., M.A., Ph.D.)

Military service
- Allegiance: United States of America
- Branch/service: United States Navy
- Years of service: 1917-1918
- Battles/wars: World War One

Charles Rosenbury Erdman Jr. (August 25, 1897 – October 15, 1984) was an American Republican Party politician who served as Mayor of the Borough of Princeton, New Jersey and Chairman of the New Jersey Republican State Committee.

== Biography ==
Erdman was born in Philadelphia to Charles R. and Estelle P. (Pardee) Erdman in 1897 and moved with his parents to Princeton in 1905. He attended the Lawrenceville School and then Princeton University. His studies were interrupted by World War I, during which time he served with the United States Navy Aviation Corps. Returning to Princeton, he was captain of the track team in 1919 and 1920 and intercollegiate hurdle champion. After receiving his B.A. degree in 1920, he went on to postgraduate work in political science, also at Princeton. He received his M.A. degree in 1924 and his Ph.D. degree in 1928. He married Lucy Bulkley (April 22, 1901 – May 1995) on June 14, 1922.

Erdman was assistant professor in the Princeton department of politics from 1928 until 1935, and then served as a research associate for the Princeton Local Government Survey from 1935 to 1940. In 1940, he was appointed by the New Jersey Legislature as director of the Municipal Aid Administration, and he became Commissioner of Economic Development in 1944.

He authored two books on the New Jersey State Constitution, arguing for reform: The New Jersey Constitution of 1776 (Princeton, 1929) and The New Jersey Constitution: A Barrier to Governmental Efficiency and Economy (Princeton, 1934). In the 1940s he worked to update the State Constitution, serving as secretary of the Constitutional Revision Commission.

Erdman served six terms as Mayor of the Borough of Princeton, New Jersey between 1936 and 1949. In 1949 he was appointed Commissioner of the newly created New Jersey Department of Conservation and Economic Development, serving until 1954. During his term of office he acquired large tracts for use as public lands, including Wharton State Forest in the Pine Barrens and stretches of beaches on the Jersey Shore.

In 1958, Erdman was elected as Chairman of the New Jersey Republican State Committee, succeeding the late Samuel L. Bodine. Erdman won over Webster B. Todd, with the backing of U.S. Senator Clifford P. Case and State Senator Walter H. Jones of Bergen County. He resigned in 1961 to protest campaign tactics by James P. Mitchell in that year's campaign for Governor of New Jersey.

Erdman died in 1984 at his home in Princeton at the age of 87 after battling Parkinson's disease for several years.

Party political offices
Preceded by Samuel L. Bodine	Chairman of the New Jersey Republican State Committee; 1958–1961	Succeeded by Webster B. Todd
