= Beemerville, New Jersey =

Populated place in Sussex County, New Jersey, US

- Unincorporated community
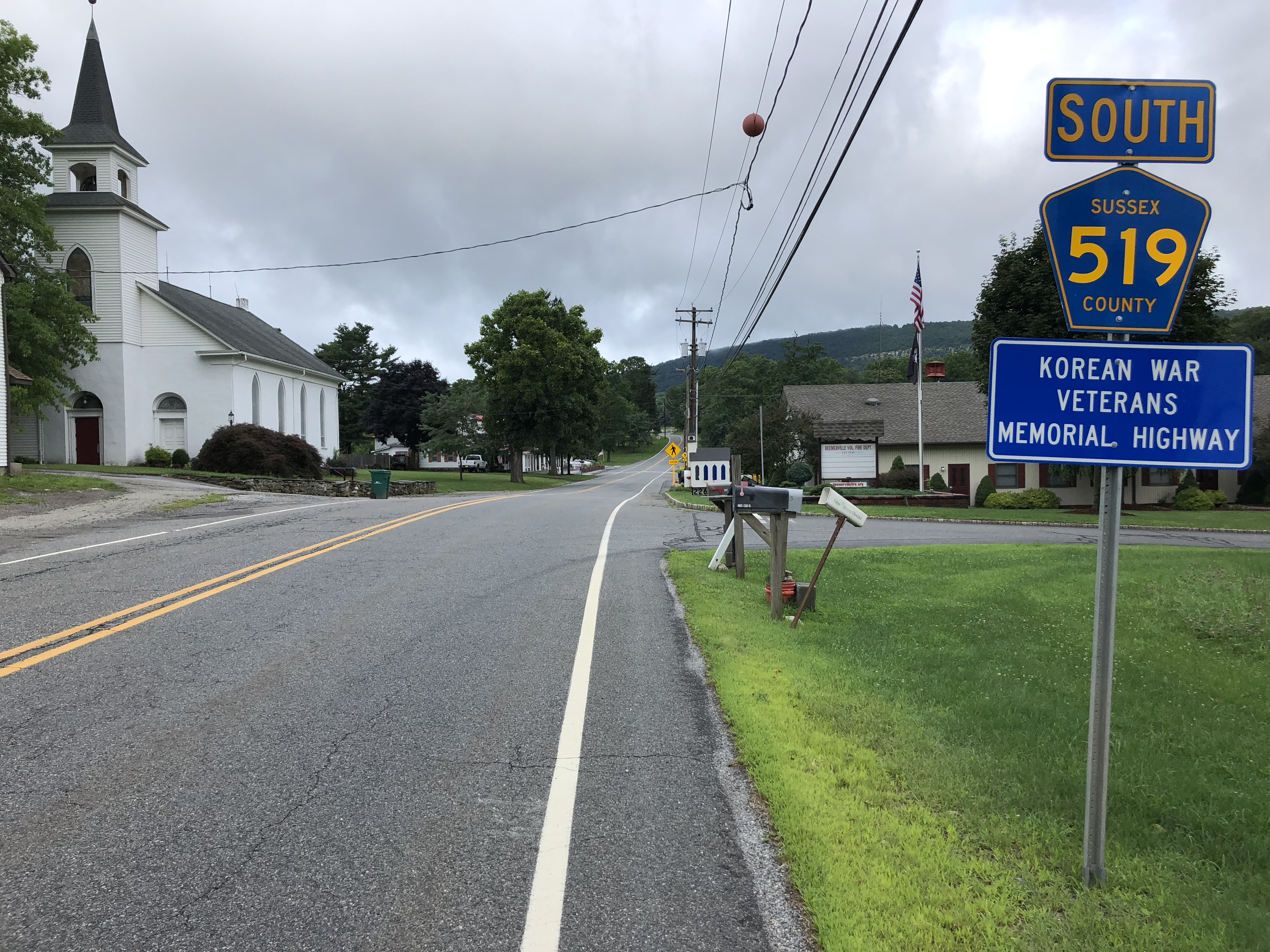
- CR 519 southbound through Beemerville

- Location of Beemerville in Sussex County Inset: Location of county within the state of New Jersey Beemerville, New Jersey (New Jersey) Beemerville, New Jersey (the United States)
- Coordinates: 41.2106512°N 74.6915525°W
- Country: United States
- State: New Jersey
- County: Sussex
- Township: Wantage
- Elevation: 232 ft (71 m)
- Time zone: UTC−05:00 (Eastern (EST))
  - Summer (DST): UTC−04:00 (Eastern (EDT))
- Area code: 973
- GNIS feature ID: 874637

Beemerville is an unincorporated community located within Wantage Township in Sussex County, in the U.S. state of New Jersey.

Space Farms Zoo and Museum, established in 1927, is a combination of a natural environment for animals and historical museum located on County Route 519 in Beemerville.
