= Tom Wilson (lobbyist) =

Tom Wilson (born 1967) is an American Republican Party leader who served as the chairman of the New Jersey Republican State Committee from 2004 to 2009.

== Biography ==
Wilson grew up in Bridgewater Township, New Jersey and graduated from Bridgewater-Raritan High School East in 1985. He attended University of Vermont and received a B.A. degree in political science in 1989. After college he worked as the political director of the Assembly Republican Majority, a New Jersey Republican fundraising organization chaired by Chuck Haytaian. In 1991 Haytaian became Speaker of the New Jersey General Assembly and hired Wilson as the director of his office. In 1992 he was a strategist for the unsuccessful campaign of W. Cary Edwards for Governor of New Jersey, before going on to work for the political consultant David Welch on state legislative races.

When Haytaian became chairman of the New Jersey Republican State Committee in 1995, Wilson was named executive director. Haytaian urged Governor Christine Todd Whitman to hire Wilson as her campaign manager for her 1997 race for reelection against Jim McGreevey. After successfully managing the Whitman campaign, he joined the Strategy Group, a consulting and lobbying firm. In 2001 he served as communications director for Donald DiFrancesco, then president of the New Jersey Senate and acting governor. He also served under Richard Codey when he briefly took over as acting governor in January 2002.

In November 2004 Wilson was elected chairman of the New Jersey Republican State Committee, in the lead-up to the 2005 gubernatorial primary battle between Doug Forrester, Bret Schundler, and five other candidates. Forrester won the primary but lost in the general election to Jon Corzine.

During the Corzine administration, Wilson was especially critical of the governor's relationship with Carla Katz, president of Local 1034 of the Communications Workers of America. Wilson lodged a lawsuit to force Corzine to reveal all correspondence with Katz in order to determine whether her previous romantic relationship with the governor improperly influenced contract negotiations. On May 30, 2008, New Jersey Superior Court Judge Paul Innes ruled that at least 745 records of e-mail correspondence between Corzine and Katz should be made public, but Corzine's lawyers immediately appealed the decision.

On June 11, 2009, Republican gubernatorial candidate Christopher J. Christie announced his selection of Assemblyman Jay Webber to succeed Wilson as party chairman. State Committee members unanimously supported the selection of Webber in a vote on June 17, 2009.

Wilson has been married to Lysa Israel, a Republican fundraiser, since 1993. They reside in Montgomery Township, New Jersey.

From 2009 to 2016, Wilson was a Partner in the Kaufman Zita Group, a bi-partisan public affairs, lobbying and strategic communications firm in Princeton, New Jersey. He is now the Director of Public Affairs at Horizon Blue Cross Blue Shield of New Jersey, the state's largest and oldest health insurance company. He is a frequent commentator on government and politics in New Jersey.

Party political offices
| Preceded by Joseph M. Kyrillos | Chairman of the New Jersey Republican State Committee; November 23, 2004 – June 17, 2009 | Succeeded by Jay Webber |
