= Joe Kyrillos =

American politician and businessman

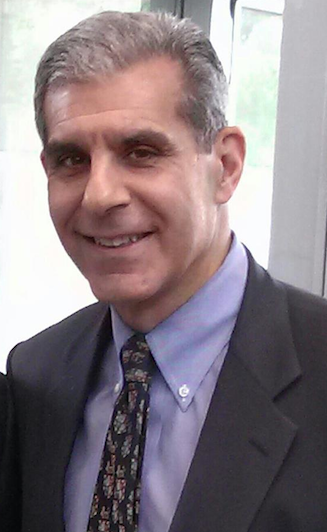

Chair of the New Jersey Republican Party
- In office May 8, 2001 – November 23, 2004
- Preceded by: Chuck Haytaian
- Succeeded by: Tom Wilson

Member of the New Jersey Senate from the 13th district
- In office January 14, 1992 – January 9, 2018
- Preceded by: James Phillips
- Succeeded by: Declan O'Scanlon

Member of the New Jersey General Assembly from the 13th district
- In office January 12, 1988 – January 14, 1992
- Preceded by: Joseph Azzolina
- Succeeded by: Joseph Azzolina

Personal details
- Born: April 12, 1960 (age 66) Kearny, New Jersey, U.S.
- Party: Republican
- Spouse: Susan Doctorian
- Children: 2
- Education: Hobart College (BA); Boston University (MS)
- Website: Campaign website

Joseph M. Kyrillos Jr. (born April 12, 1960) is an American Republican Party politician and businessman from New Jersey. Kyrillos served in the New Jersey State Senate from 1992 to 2018, where he represented the 13th legislative district, and in the General Assembly from 1988 to 1992.

Kyrillos started the consulting firm SK partners and is employed with Newport Capital Group, Red Bank, a financial services firm. He is affiliated with Woodmont Properties, a regional real estate development company and is senior managing director of Newmark Grubb Knight Frank, a commercial real estate services firm.

From 2001 to 2004, Kyrillos served as Chairman of the New Jersey Republican State Committee and a member of the Republican National Committee. In that role, he facilitated the logistics and implementation of the 2004 Republican National Convention in New York City and read the delegate count for President George W. Bush’s nomination for re-election on the convention floor. He was the New Jersey Chairman of Mitt Romney’s campaign in 2008, and in 2009, he served as the Chairman of Governor Christie's successful campaign and as a member of the transition team. He served as a close advisor to former Florida Governor Jeb Bush in the 2016 Republican Party presidential primaries.

== Early life and education ==
Joseph M. Kyrillos Jr. was born April 12, 1960, in Kearny, New Jersey, one of four children of a pediatrician, Dr. Joseph M. Kyrillos, and his wife, Marguerite Kyrillos (née Shlala), who wed on May 11, 1958. His father and his mother's parents immigrated to the United States from Lebanon. His maternal grandfather worked as a tool and die maker at Thomas Edison's factory in West Orange. His mother graduated from college at age 50.

Kyrillos graduated from Rumson Country Day School and the Lawrenceville School. He received a B.A. degree from Hobart College in Political Science and was awarded an M.S. from Boston University in Communications.

After graduating from college, Kyrillos worked for Vice President George Bush during the 1984 Reagan-Bush campaign. Following the campaign, he served as Special Assistant to Secretary of the Interior Donald Hodel from 1985 to 1987.

Kyrillos has served on the Executive Committee of the National Conference of State Legislatures and as a trustee of the American Council of Young Political Leaders.

== New Jersey Assembly (1988–1992) ==
=== Elections ===
Kyrillos was first elected to the New Jersey General Assembly in 1987, together with his incumbent running mate Joann H. Smith, with both candidates receiving more than $25,000 each in campaign funding from the $1.1 million spent by the New Jersey Republican State Committee to support candidates statewide. In 1989, he won re-election to a second term. After spending two terms in the Assembly, he retired to run for the seat in the New Jersey Senate in 1991.

=== Tenure ===
Kyrillos strongly opposed Democratic Governor Jim Florio's tax increases, citing his opposition to "the Florio tax plan" repeatedly in his campaign advertising. He also opposed the Abbott districts.

=== Committee assignments ===
- Assembly Education Committee

== New Jersey Senate (1992–2018) ==
=== Elections ===
In 1991, Kyrillos decided to run for the 13th District seat in the New Jersey Senate. He defeated incumbent appointed Senator James T. Phillips 68%-32%. In 1993, after redistricting, he won re-election to a second term with 64% of the vote. In 1997, he won re-election to a third term with 63% of the vote.

After redistricting, the 13th district became more competitive. In 2001, he won re-election to a fourth term (two-year term) with 64% of the vote. He won re-election to a fifth term in 2003 against former state assemblyman Bill Flynn 54%-41%. In 2007, he won re-election to a sixth term with 61% of the vote. In 2011, he won re-election to a seventh term, defeating Hazlet Mayor Chris Cullen, 60%-37%.

=== Tenure ===
When Republicans held the legislative majority in the Statehouse, Kyrillos served as Majority Conference Leader and chaired standing committees on economic development and coastal resources.

Kyrillos was ranking member of the Economic Growth, Judiciary and Legislative Oversight committees.

On October 25, 2016, Kyrillos told Observer.com that he would not seek a re-election for the 2017 State Senate elections. He was succeeded by Assemblyman Declan O'Scanlon in 2018.

=== Committee assignments ===
- Senate Natural Resources and Tourism Committee (Chairman)
- Senate Economic Growth Committee
- Senate Judiciary Committee
- Senate Oversight Committee

Other positions

- Senate Majority Conference Leader
- New Jersey Republican State Committee (Chairman)

== Other political activities ==
=== 1992 congressional election ===
In 1992, Kyrillos ran for the United States House of Representatives but was defeated by incumbent Democrat Frank Pallone in a competitive race, falling short by about 10 points.

=== 2001–2004: Chairman, New Jersey Republican State Committee ===
From 2001 to 2004, Kyrillos served as Chairman of the New Jersey Republican State Committee and a member of the Republican National Committee, where he worked to elect Republicans who shared his vision. In that role, he facilitated the logistics and implementation of the 2004 Republican National Convention in New York City and read the delegate count for President George W. Bush's nomination for re-election on the convention floor.

=== 2008 Romney presidential campaign ===
Kyrillos was the New Jersey Chairman of Mitt Romney's 2008 presidential campaign.

=== 2009 Christie gubernatorial campaign ===
In 2009, Kyrillos served as chairman of Chris Christie's successful gubernatorial campaign and was a member of the Governor's Transition Committee, serving as the liaison to all transition sub-committees.

=== 2012 U.S. Senate election ===
In June 2011, Kyrillos filed an exploratory committee for a potential race in either 2012 or 2014.

On January 19, 2012, Kyrillos officially decided to run for the U.S. Senate, citing unemployment, housing prices and the national debt as issues he would tackle in the Senate. Kyrillos won the Republican nomination on June 5, 2012. He opposed Democratic incumbent Bob Menendez in the November 6th general election, in which he was defeated 58.4% to 40%.

=== Memberships ===
Kyrillos has served on the boards of the American Council of Young Political Leaders, National Conference of State Legislatures Foundation, Bayshore Senior Day Center, Count Basie Theatre, Garden State Arts Center Foundation, Monmouth County Historical Association, New Jersey Historical Society, Prevention First, Rainbow Foundation, and the Two River Theatre Company.

== Personal life ==
Kyrillos is married to Susan Doctorian Kyrillos and has two children, Max and Georgia.

== Election history ==
=== US Senate ===
United States Senate election in New Jersey, 2012
Party	Candidate	Votes	%	±%
Democratic	Bob Menendez (incumbent)	1,987,680	58.87%	+5.50%
Republican	Joseph Kyrillos	1,329,534	39.37%	−4.98%
Libertarian	Kenneth R. Kaplan	16,803	0.50%	−0.15%
Green	Ken Wolski	15,801	0.47%	
Independent	Gwen Diakos	9,359	0.28%	
Independent	J. David Dranikoff	3,834	0.11%	
Independent	Inder "Andy" Soni	3,593	0.11%	
Independent	Robert "Turk" Turkavage	3,532	0.10%	
Socialist	Greg Pason	2,249	0.07%	
Independent	Eugene M. LaVergne	2,198	0.07%	
Independent	Daryl Brooks	2,066	0.06%	
Majority		658,146	19.49%	
Turnout		3,376,649		

Republican primary results
Party	Candidate	Votes	%
Republican	Joe Kyrillos	161,146	77.1
Republican	David Brown	18,671	8.9
Republican	Joseph Rullo	16,690	8.0
Republican	Bader Qarmout	12,637	6.0
Total votes		209,144	100%

=== State Senate ===
New Jersey State Senate elections, 2013
Party	Candidate	Votes	%
Republican	Joe Kyrillos (incumbent)	40,762	68.1
Democratic	Joseph Marques	18,289	30.6
The People's Choice	Mac Dara F. Lyden	774	1.3
Republican hold			

New Jersey State Senate elections, 2011
Party	Candidate	Votes	%
Republican	Joseph M. Kyrillos (incumbent)	24,121	60.0
Democratic	Christopher G. Cullen	14,785	36.7
Constitution	Stephen J. Boracchia	556	1.4%
Keep Monmouth Green	Karen Anne Zaletel	519	1.3%
Jobs-Economy-Honesty	Mac Dara F. Lyden	260	0.6%
Republican hold			

New Jersey State Senate elections, 2007
Party	Candidate	Votes	%
Republican	Joseph M. Kyrillos (incumbent)	25,119	60.7
Democratic	Leonard L. Inzerillo	16,267	39.3
Republican hold			

2003 New Jersey general election
Party	Candidate	Votes	%	±%
Republican	Joe Kyrillos Jr	23,459	54.1	▼10.3
Democratic	William E. Flynn	17,828	41.1	▲5.5
Green	Greg Orr	1,419	3.3	N/A
Conservative	Mac Dara Lyden	649	1.5	N/A
Total votes		43,355	100.0	

2001 New Jersey general election
Party	Candidate	Votes	%
Republican	Joe Kyrillos, Jr.	38,089	64.4
Democratic	Kiran Desai	21,066	35.6
Total votes		59,155	100.0

1997 New Jersey general election
Party	Candidate	Votes	%	±%
Republican	Joe Kyrillos, Jr.	36,047	63.2	▼0.8
Democratic	Mike Caffrey	19,733	34.6	▼1.4
Conservative	Jerome Bowe	1,299	2.3	N/A
Total votes		57,079	100.0	

1993 New Jersey general election
Party	Candidate	Votes	%	±%
Republican	Joseph M. Kyrillos, Jr.	40,140	64.0	▼3.8
Democratic	Patrick D. Healy	22,603	36.0	▲3.8
Total votes		62,743	100.0	

1991 New Jersey general election
Party	Candidate	Votes	%
Republican	Joseph M. Kyrillos	34,547	67.8
Democratic	James T. Phillips	16,437	32.2
Total votes		50,984	100.0

Party political offices
Preceded by Chuck Haytaian	Chair of the New Jersey Republican Party; 2001–2004	Succeeded by Tom Wilson
Preceded by Thomas Kean Jr.	Republican nominee for U.S. Senator from New Jersey (Class 1); 2012	Succeeded by Bob Hugin
