= Webster B. Todd =

American businessman and politician (1899–1989)

Chairman of the New Jersey Republican State Committee
- In office 1974–1976
- Preceded by: John J. Spoltore
- Succeeded by: David A. Norcross
- In office 1961–1969
- Preceded by: Charles R. Erdman, Jr.
- Succeeded by: Nelson G. Gross

Personal details
- Born: Webster Bray Todd; August 27, 1899 Yonkers, New York, U.S.
- Died: February 8, 1989 (aged 89) Oldwick, New Jersey, U.S.
- Party: Republican
- Spouse: Eleanor Prentice Schley (m. 1933)
- Children: 4, including Christine Todd Whitman
- Education: Princeton University; Fordham University School of Law
- Occupation: Businessman

Webster Bray Todd (August 27, 1899 – February 8, 1989) was an American businessman, a Republican Party leader in New Jersey, and the father of New Jersey Governor Christine Todd Whitman.

== Early life ==
Todd was born in Yonkers, New York, the son of Alice Peck (née Bray) and John Reynard Todd (c. 1868–1945), a lawyer who served as president of the Todd, Robertson, Todd Construction and Engineering firm and was a New Jersey delegate to the 1928, 1932, and 1940 Republican National Conventions. His paternal grandparents were the Rev. James Doeg Todd, a Presbyterian minister, and Susan Webster Todd.

He later moved with his parents to Summit, New Jersey. He attended Choate Rosemary Hall, Princeton University (Class of 1922), and Fordham University School of Law.

== Career ==
In 1923, he became a partner in the Todd, Robertson, Todd Engineering Corporation, along with his father and his brother, James Todd. The firm was responsible for two projects initiated by the Rockefeller family: the reconstruction of Colonial Williamsburg and the construction of Rockefeller Center. In 1928 he formed his own architectural-engineering firm, Todd & Brown Inc, with Joseph O. Brown. He also served as director of the Metropolitan Life Insurance Company.

=== Republican politics ===
In 1950, Todd retired from business and devoted much of the remainder of his life to Republican politics in New Jersey. He was the state chairman for Dwight D. Eisenhower's presidential campaign in 1952. Upon Eisenhower's election he was appointed director of the Office of Economic Affairs of the United States mission to the North Atlantic Treaty Organization in Paris. He served as chairman of the New Jersey Republican Finance Committee from 1948 to 1953 and from 1973 to 1974. He was chairman of the New Jersey Republican State Committee from 1961 to 1969 and again from 1974 to 1976.

His wife was also active in New Jersey Republican politics. She was president of the New Jersey Federation of Republican Women from 1946 to 1952. She was elected vice chairman of the Republican National Committee in 1956 and served as a Republican National Committeewoman from 1956 to 1966. In 1983, Gov. Thomas Kean appointed her to the New Jersey Board of Higher Education, where she served until 1988.

== Personal life ==
On October 12, 1933, Todd married Eleanor Prentice Schley (1911–1990), daughter of Reeve Schley, in Basking Ridge, New Jersey. They settled in Oldwick, New Jersey and raised four children, all of whom would serve in various elected and appointed offices at the local, state, and federal government levels. Their children were:

- Kate Todd (1934–2015), who served as acting Treasurer of the United States and was married to Samuel F. Beach Jr.
- John Todd
- Webster Bray Todd Jr. (1938–2021), who served in the New Jersey General Assembly (1968–1970) and Inspector General of Foreign Assistance.
- Christine Todd (b. 1946), who served as Governor of New Jersey and who married John Whitman, a grandson of New York Governor Charles Seymour Whitman.

In 1989, at the age of 89, Todd died of a heart attack at his home in Oldwick, New Jersey.

Party political offices
Preceded by Charles R. Erdman, Jr.	Chairman of the New Jersey Republican State Committee; 1961–1969	Succeeded by Nelson G. Gross
Preceded by John J. Spoltore	Chairman of the New Jersey Republican State Committee; 1974–1976	Succeeded by David A. Norcross
