= Space Farms Zoo and Museum =

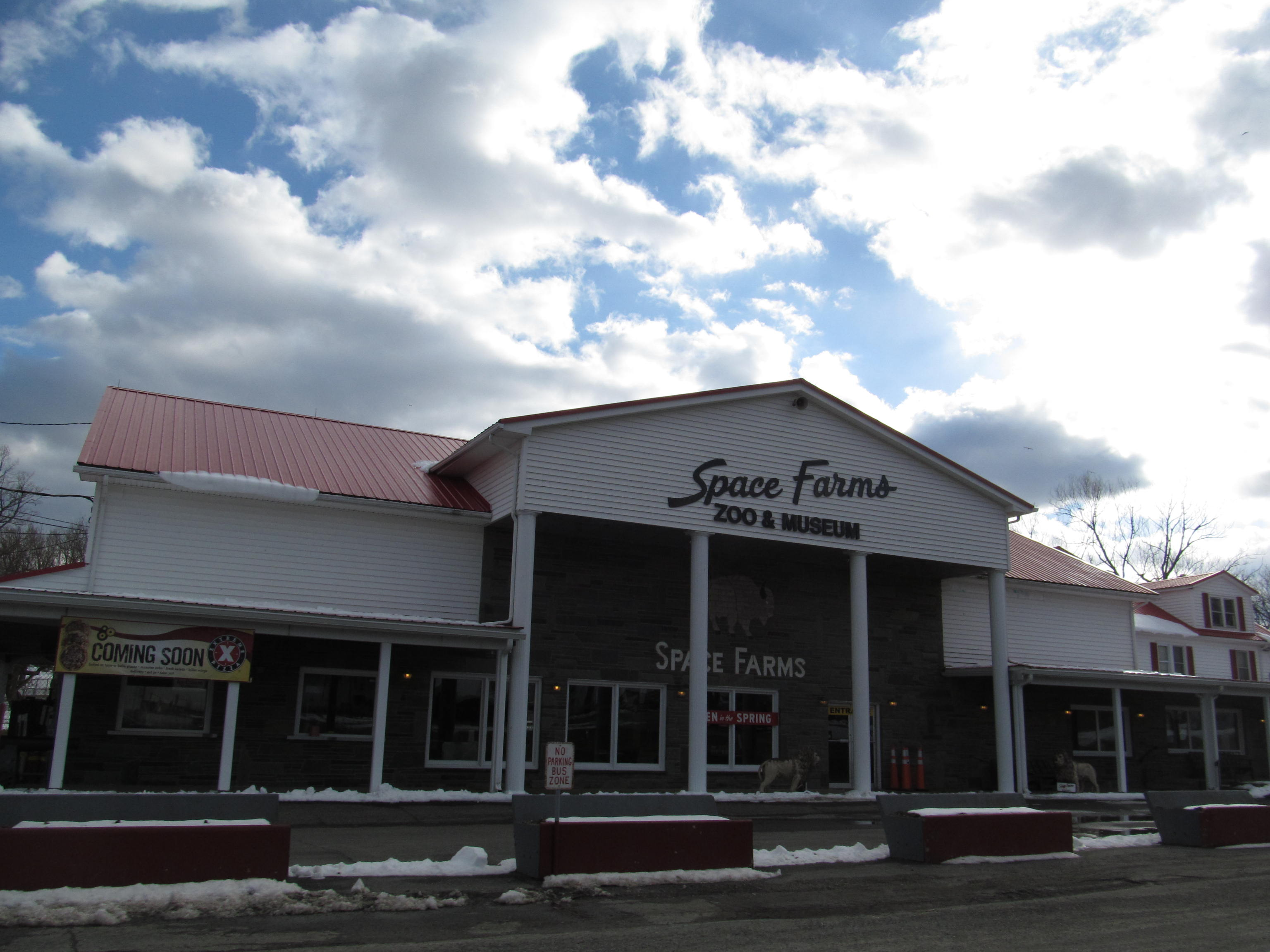
- Entrance to the attraction
- Interactive map of Space Farms Zoo and Museum
- 41.2096°N 74.6930°W
- Date opened: 1927
- Location: 218 County Road 519, Sussex, NJ 07461
- Website: www.spacefarms.com

Space Farms Zoo and Museum is a roadside zoo and historical museum in Sussex County, New Jersey, currently owned by New Jersey State Senator Parker Space.

The zoo was founded in 1927 and is home to more than 500 live animals, including some endangered species.

== Exhibits ==
The Space Farms museum houses antique vehicles and items used during the early history of the United States, such as horse-drawn carriages and early motorcycles. The vehicles are largely unrestored. There are also colonial period tools and weapons on display.

=== Animals ===
According to the zoo's website, residents include African lions, black leopards, South American jaguar, cougars, lynx, bobcats, Bengal tigers, as well as Grizzly bears, Hokkaido bears, Kodiak bears, and black bears.

Space Farms hosted a large bear in captivity exhibition, which showcased a Kodiak bear named Goliath, as part of a taxidermy exhibit in the main hall of the museum. After his death in 1991, his skull was put on display in the Space Farms museum.

=== Human bones ===
In 1979, the skeletal remains of three men uncovered nearby were stored "for safekeeping" at Space Farms. Nearly thirty years later, forensic experts with the American Museum of Natural History determined that the bones belonged to African-American men enslaved by the family who owned the property where they were uncovered.
