= Samuel L. Bodine =

American politician

President of the New Jersey Senate
- In office 1950–1950
- Preceded by: David Van Alstyne
- Succeeded by: Alfred B. Littell

Member of the New Jersey Senate from Hunterdon County
- In office 1944–1953
- Preceded by: Wesley Lance
- Succeeded by: Wesley Lance

Chair of the New Jersey Republican Party
- In office 1953–1958
- Preceded by: John J. Dickerson
- Succeeded by: Charles R. Erdman Jr.

Personal details
- Born: January 22, 1900 Pittstown, New Jersey, U.S.
- Died: September 15, 1958 (aged 58) Point Pleasant, New Jersey, U.S.
- Party: Republican
- Spouse: Ida Rittenhouse Stryker (m. 1932)
- Children: Samuel "Tony" Bodine
- Education: Lafayette College

Samuel Louis Bodine (January 22, 1900 – September 15, 1958) was an American Republican Party politician who served in the New Jersey Senate and as chairman of the New Jersey Republican State Committee.

== Biography ==
Bodine was born in Pittstown, New Jersey in 1900 to Amplius B.C. and Ellen Schenk (Hoagland) Bodine. He was raised in Flemington, where his father had established the Bodine Lumber Company in 1895. He was educated in Flemington schools and then attended Lafayette College, where he was awarded a Bachelor of Science degree in 1920. After graduation, he joined his father's lumber company. He married Ida Rittenhouse Stryker on July 6, 1932, and they had one child, Samuel (known as Tony), born January 14, 1934.

Bodine served as Mayor of Flemington, New Jersey from 1928 to 1936 and went on to serve on the Hunterdon County Board of Chosen Freeholders from 1937 to 1942. In 1943, he was elected to the New Jersey Senate, where he served until 1953. In the Senate, he was the majority leader for one year and served another as Senate President and acting Governor.

In April 1953, Bodine was selected as chairman of the New Jersey Republican State Committee by Paul L. Troast, then the Republican nominee for Governor of New Jersey. He was credited with uniting party factions after Troast lost in a landslide to Robert B. Meyner, as well as bringing the party together to support the nomination of Clifford P. Case for United States Senate in 1954.

In 1957, Republican gubernatorial nominee Malcolm Forbes, sought to remove him from the party chairmanship, but Forbes backed down from this move after Bodine was given strong support from county chairmen and he was reelected. He died of a heart ailment the following year at Point Pleasant Hospital at the age of 58.

Political offices
Preceded by David Van Alstyne	President of the New Jersey Senate; 1950	Succeeded by Alfred B. Littell
Party political offices
Preceded by John J. Dickerson	Chairman of the New Jersey Republican State Committee; 1953–1958	Succeeded by Charles R. Erdman, Jr.
