= John J. Dickerson =

American politician

Chairman of the New Jersey Republican State Committee
- In office 1949–1953
- Preceded by: Lloyd B. Marsh
- Succeeded by: Samuel L. Bodine

New Jersey State Treasurer
- In office 1949–1949
- Governor: Alfred E. Driscoll
- Preceded by: Robert C. Hendrickson
- Succeeded by: Walter Margetts

Personal details
- Born: August 2, 1900 Manhattan, New York, U.S.
- Died: August 20, 1966 (aged 66) Palisades Park, New Jersey, U.S.
- Party: Republican

John Joseph Dickerson (August 2, 1900 – August 20, 1966) was an American Republican Party politician who served as Mayor of Palisades Park, New Jersey and Chairman of the New Jersey Republican State Committee.

== Biography ==
Dickerson was a powerful leader of the Bergen County Republican organization. He served as mayor of Palisades Park from 1939 to 1952. He was also a member of the county's Board of Chosen Freeholders from 1940 to 1955, and its director for four years.

In 1946 he managed the successful campaign of Alfred E. Driscoll for Governor of New Jersey. After Driscoll's election he was named State Banking Commissioner. He also served briefly as state treasurer in 1949, but resigned when he was selected by Driscoll as chairman of the New Jersey Republican State Committee. He also ran Driscoll's reelection campaign that year, while continuing to serve as mayor and freeholder.

In an investigation into Bergen County corruption following the Kefauver hearings, Dickerson testified that he had helped Democrat John V. Kenny in his 1949 campaign for mayor of Jersey City as a way of disrupting the Hudson County political machine of Frank Hague. After Kenny's win over Hague's nephew Frank H. Eggers in the Democratic primary, Kenny's Hudson County organization did not work hard for Democratic gubernatorial candidate Elmer H. Wene, helping to ensure Driscoll's victory in the general election.

Dickerson further testified that the Republican State Committee had accepted a $25,000 "loan" from a friend of mob boss Abner Zwillman and had kept no record of the cash repayment. Even more sensational was the claim by Genovese underboss Willie Moretti, who ran gambling rings in Bergen County, that he had paid $286,000 to a New Jersey State House aide with the understanding that $190,000 of it would go to Governor Driscoll for protection from the state. Dickerson denied that there was such a bribe but acknowledged that Moretti visited his house in November 1950, along with his brother Salvatore and associate Joe Adonis. Moretti complained that he had received no protection as the result of the alleged bribe and warned Dickerson, "Tell the governor and the attorney general that I don't intend to take this laying down." Moretti was murdered the following year.

Dickerson did not seek reelection as party chairman and was replaced in 1953 by Samuel L. Bodine. After an abortive run for mayor of Palisades Park in 1958, Dickerson retired from politics and pursued a business career as a New York real estate executive. He died at his home in Palisades Park in 1966 at the age of 66.

Party political offices
Preceded by Lloyd B. Marsh	Chairman of the New Jersey Republican State Committee; 1949–1953	Succeeded by Samuel L. Bodine
