= Doug Steinhardt =

American politician (born 1968)

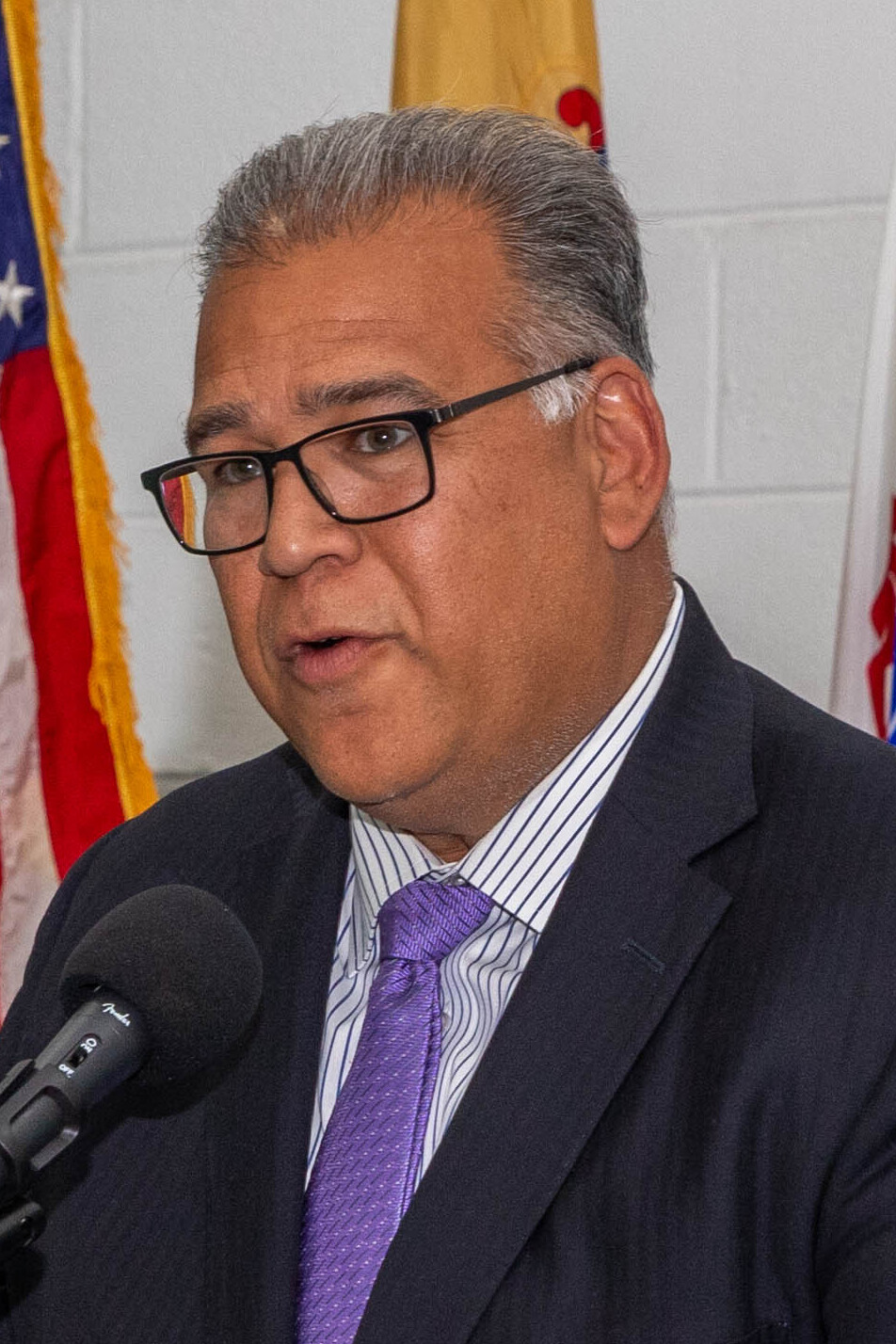
- Steinhardt in 2024

Member of the New Jersey Senate from the 23rd district
- Incumbent
- Assumed office December 19, 2022
- Preceded by: Michael J. Doherty

Chair of the New Jersey Republican Party
- In office November 21, 2017 – December 15, 2020
- Preceded by: Michael B. Lavery
- Succeeded by: Michael B. Lavery

Chair of the Warren County Republican Party
- Incumbent
- Assumed office January 31, 2004
- Preceded by: Walter Orcutt

Mayor of Lopatcong
- In office January 2000 – January 2015
- Preceded by: William Baker
- Succeeded by: Tom McKay

Personal details
- Born: Douglas Joseph Steinhardt; November 6, 1968 (age 57) Belvidere, New Jersey, U.S.
- Party: Republican
- Spouse: Trudy Steinhardt
- Children: 2
- Education: Gettysburg College (BA); Widener University (JD)

Douglas Joseph Steinhardt (born November 6, 1968) is an American attorney and politician from New Jersey who represents the 23rd legislative district in the New Jersey Senate, since being sworn into office on December 19, 2022. He previously served as the Chairman of the New Jersey Republican State Committee from 2017 to 2020. In January 2025, President Donald Trump announced Steinhardt as his nominee to be the United States Attorney for the District of New Jersey but Steinhardt withdrew himself from consideration the following month.

== Early life and education ==
Steinhardt was born in Belvidere, New Jersey and received his undergraduate degree in history from Gettysburg College in 1991. He was also a four-year member of the Gettysburg NCAA Division III football team, as well as a brother of the Phi Delta Theta fraternity. After completing his undergraduate studies he enrolled in Widener University Commonwealth Law School where he earned his J.D. in 1994. During law school he served as the associate editor of the Law Review.

== Career ==
After law school, Steinhardt returned to New Jersey to begin his law career in his father's law office in Belvidere, New Jersey. In 2005, he helped form the Law Firm of Florio Perrucci Steinhardt & Fader, LLC, by becoming the third named partner in the law firm that is headed by former New Jersey Governor James Florio.

In 2015, Steinhardt was inducted into the Warren County, New Jersey Hall of Fame, joining his mother Therese, a nurse and nurse educator, who was inducted in 2013.

In August 2026, Steinhardt began teaching at Widener University Commonwealth Law School, his alma mater, as an adjunct professor of law, teaching Law, Power, & Government.

=== Municipal politics ===
In his first run for public office, Steinhardt was elected Mayor of Lopatcong Township in 1999, beating Democratic incumbent William Baker by twelve votes. He ran on controlling development, and challenged Baker to debates, which Baker declined to participate in. In his reelection campaign in 2002, he again defeated Baker, this time with 80% of the vote. He ran and won with no opposition for the next three elections. He declined to run for a sixth term in 2014 and was succeeded by Tom McKay.

Steinhardt was elected chairman of the Warren County Republican Committee on January 31, 2004, to fill the unexpired term of the outgoing chair who resigned to focus on private sector opportunities. He ran on the idea of promoting inclusion among Republican committee members, some of whom often complained about a lack of communications within the county committee. He defeated his opponent by a 2–1 margin among elected members of the committee According to the Express Times his leadership style and ability to bring various factions of the party together made it so that he ran unopposed for a full term six months later.

After his first election as the county committee chair, Steinhardt ran unopposed and won every two years, except for 2012. In that year, Steinhardt faced opposition because he had lost his Lopatcong committee seat, though only by five votes. Steinhardt defeated a committeeperson from Greenwich Township who challenged his position in a 92–35 vote.

=== State chairman and gubernatorial run ===
He was initially nominated by Lieutenant Governor Kim Guadagno and Republican primary nominee to be the chairman of the New Jersey State Republican Committee in June 2017 but a last-minute appointment by the then governor of his wife to a position with the parole board caused concern for the Lieutenant Governor. Steinhardt withdrew his candidacy and was replaced by Michael B. Lavery. Six months later in November 2017, after the Democratic victory in the ensuing gubernatorial election, Lavery resigned and Steinhardt was named chairman.

Steinhardt resigned as chairman in December 2020 and launched a bid for Governor of New Jersey in the Republican primary. He positioned himself as a staunch supporter of outgoing president Donald Trump. However, he withdrew from the race on January 11, 2021, shortly after the storming of the U.S. Capitol by Trump supporters.

== New Jersey Senate ==
In September 2022, following the announcement that longtime state senator Michael J. Doherty would retire to seek the Warren County Surrogate's Office, Steinhardt announced that he would run in a special election convention for Doherty's vacated senate seat representing the 23rd legislative district.

Steinhardt was elected to the seat unopposed on December 10, 2022, at a special convention. He was sworn into office on December 19, 2022. He was re-elected in 2023.

=== Electoral history ===
23rd Legislative District Senate General Election, 2023
Party	Candidate	Votes	%
Republican	Douglas Steinhardt (incumbent)	31,066	57.7
Democratic	Denise King	22,790	42.3
Total votes		53,856	100.0
Republican hold			

=== Committees ===
Steinhardt's committee assignments for the 2024—2025 Legislative Session are:

- Budget and Appropriations
- Labor

=== District 23 ===
Each of the 40 districts in the New Jersey Legislature has one representative in the New Jersey Senate and two members in the New Jersey General Assembly. The representatives from the 23rd District for the 2024—2025 Legislative Session are:

- Senator Doug Steinhardt (R)
- Assemblyman John DiMaio (R)
- Assemblyman Erik Peterson (R)

== Youth organization and non-profit causes ==
As a youth, Steinhardt earned the Eagle Scout award. He was on the Board of Directors of the Central New Jersey Council of the Boy Scouts of America as of 2011. In January 2017 Steinhardt co-founded and co-chairs the Warren County Addiction Awareness Task Force to address the spiraling heroin and opioid epidemics.

Political offices
Preceded by William Baker	Mayor of Lopatcong; 2000–2015	Succeeded by Tom McKay
Party political offices
Preceded by Michael Lavery	Chair of the New Jersey Republican Party; 2017–2020	Succeeded by Michael Lavrey
