= New Jersey Department of Labor and Workforce Development =

Governmental agency of the U.S. state of New Jersey

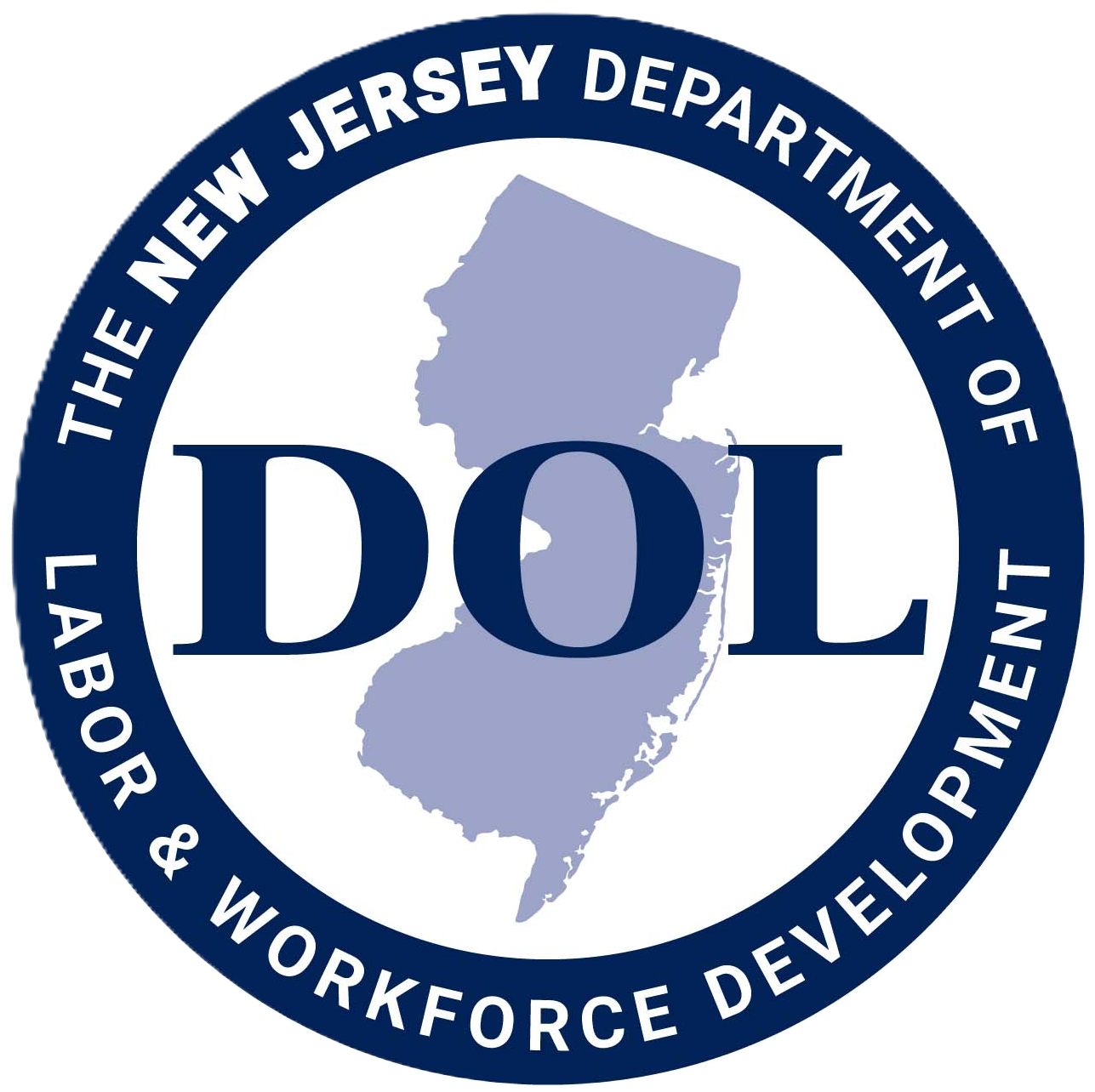
- Seal of the NJDOL

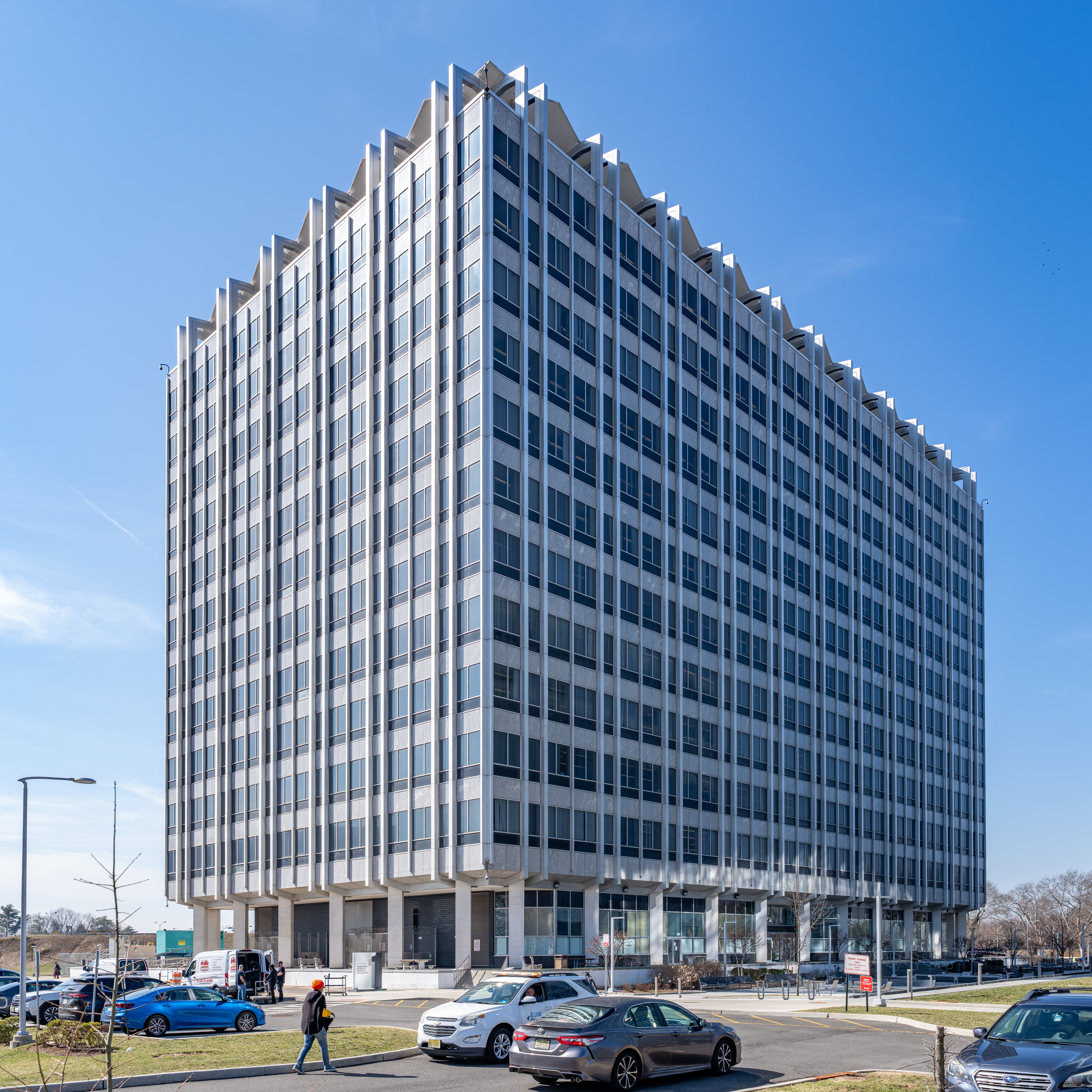
- Headquarters of the NJDOL in Trenton

Department overview
- Formed: January 1, 1949; 77 years ago (as Department of Labor and Industry)
- Jurisdiction: Government of New Jersey
- Headquarters: 1 John Fitch Plaza Trenton, NJ 08625
- Annual budget: US$804.2 million (FY2027) (73% federal)
- Department executive: Kevin Jarvis, Acting Commissioner
- Website: https://www.nj.gov/labor/

The New Jersey Department of Labor and Workforce Development (NJDOL) is a governmental agency of the U.S. state of New Jersey. The New Jersey Civil Service Commission is an independent body within the New Jersey state government under the auspices of the department.

Initially constituted in the late-1940s, pursuant to P.L. 1948, c.446, as the Department of Labor and Industry, the department is one of 16 executive branch departments in New Jersey state government. Governor Jim McGreevey's enactment of P.L. 2004, c.39 in June 2004 changed the name of the department from the New Jersey "Department of Labor" to the New Jersey "Department of Labor and Workforce Development." In addition to the name change, the statutory revisions consolidated and reorganized the state's workforce system.

== Department leadership ==
- Commissioner Kevin Jarvis
- Deputy Commissioner Catherine Frugé Starghill, Esq.
- Chief of Staff Gregory Townsend

== Major program areas and selected accomplishments ==
The department administers several of the most important programs in State government that affect the daily lives of those in the workforce, such as the workers' compensation courts, the unemployment insurance program, the temporary disability insurance program, the family leave insurance program, wage and hour enforcement, and various One-Stop Career Centers.

The department houses the Employee Residency Review Committee, as established by the New Jersey First Act (N.J.S.A 52:14-7; P.L. 2011, c.70). Signed into law by Governor Chris Christie and effective September 1, 2011, the New Jersey First Act contains new residency requirements for most public officers and employees. The New Jersey First Act states in pertinent part that a person may apply to the committee for an exemption from the residency requirement based on certain criteria.

To improve the skills of the state's workforce, the department awards grants to businesses to help train their employees. Literacy skills training grants are designed to improve workers' language proficiency, reading comprehension, communication, mathematical skill, and computer literacy skills. Customized Training grants are awarded to companies to help improve workers' skills in specific areas. Grants are awarded monthly on a competitive basis and can be used for either classroom or on-the-job training.

On November 30, 2011, Lieutenant Governor Kim Guadagno, who was serving as acting governor at the time, formally launched the Jobs4Jersey.com website at the Trenton One-Stop Career Center. Administered by the department, the free website guides both jobseekers and employers "through the maze of state and federal services and offers a unique tool that allows visitors to go online and quickly upload or create a customized résumé." The website is designed to connect jobseekers and employers looking for workers.

== Related legislation ==
- 1948: Department of Labor and Industry Act of 1948, P.L. 1948, c. 446
- 2004: Act of June 23, 2004, P.L. 2004, c. 40
