= Hal Wirths =

Member of the New Jersey General Assembly

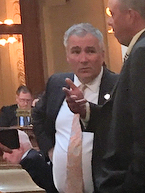

Member of the New Jersey General Assembly from the 24th District
- In office January 9, 2018 – January 9, 2024 Serving with Parker Space
- Preceded by: Gail Phoebus

Commissioner of the New Jersey Department of Labor and Workforce Development
- In office May 24, 2010 – August 1, 2016
- Governor: Chris Christie
- Preceded by: David J. Socolow
- Succeeded by: Aaron R. Fichtner

Member of the Sussex County Board of Chosen Freeholders
- In office January 1, 2000 – May 24, 2010
- Succeeded by: Parker Space

Director of the Sussex County Board of Chosen Freeholders
- In office January 1, 2004 – December 31, 2004
- Preceded by: Susan Zellman
- Succeeded by: JoAnn D'Angeli
- In office January 1, 2008 – December 31, 2008
- Preceded by: Susan Zellman
- Succeeded by: Glen Vetrano

Personal details
- Born: Harold J. Wirths; April 5, 1965 (age 61)
- Party: Republican
- Parent: Wallace R. Wirths
- Education: Upsala College
- Website: Legislative Website; Assembly Republican Website

Harold J. Wirths (born April 5, 1965) is an American Republican politician who served in the New Jersey General Assembly from 2018 to 2024, representing the 24th Legislative District. He previously served as Commissioner of the New Jersey Department of Labor and Workforce Development from May 24, 2010 to August 1, 2016, appointed by former Governor Chris Christie in 2010.

== Early life ==
Wirths is the adopted son of Wallace R. Wirths (1921–2002), a former Westinghouse executive, author, newspaper columnist and radio commentator, who was a benefactor of Upsala College in East Orange, New Jersey (now defunct), from which Wirths would go on to graduate with an associates degree in business.

Wirths was a small business owner in Sussex County in northwestern New Jersey, owning and managing furniture stores located near Hamburg, New Jersey. He also helped to establish Noble Community Bank, which today is part of Highlands State Bank, and he served on the Highlands Bank board of directors. Wirths resides in Wantage Township, New Jersey with his wife and two daughters.

== Sussex County Board of Chosen Freeholders ==
Wirths ran for Sussex County's Board of Chosen Freeholders as a Republican and served as a freeholder for nearly a decade from 2000 to 2010. He resigned from that post to become Labor Commissioner and was succeeded as Freeholder by Parker Space.

== Labor Commissioner ==
Chris Christie nominated Wirths to be the Commissioner of the New Jersey Department of Labor and Workforce Development (2010-2016) and was sworn in on May 24, 2010. One of his focuses as commissioner, was to modernize the state's unemployment insurance benefits system and reducing waste attributed to benefits fraud. He served on the boards of several state government commissions and authorities, including the New Jersey Economic Development Authority, New Jersey State Ethics Commission, New Jersey State Employment and Training Commission, and the Fort Monmouth Economic Revitalization Authority.

Under the leadership of Commissioner Wirths, the New Jersey Department of Labor and Workforce Development launched an employer-focused approach to reshape the state's workforce development and training programs.

== New Jersey Assembly ==
In 2017, he ran for the New Jersey General Assembly in the 24th Legislative District, bracketed with Parker Space and won election with 30,028 votes (27.91% of the ballots cast).

== Electoral history ==
=== New Jersey Assembly ===
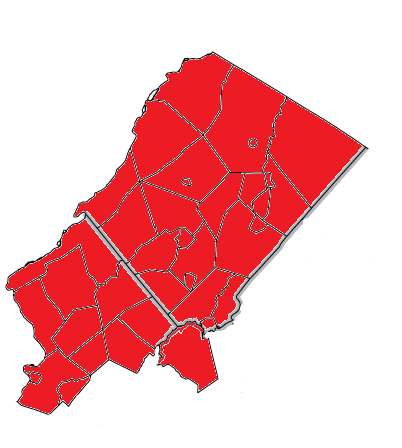
2017 General Assembly election for New Jersey's 24th District Results by Municipality

2017 General Assembly election for New Jersey's 24th District
Party	Candidate	Votes	%	±%
Republican	Parker Space (Incumbent)	33,873	30.7	▼4.3
Republican	Harold J. Wirths	30,820	27.9	▼5.4
Democratic	Kate Matteson	22,456	20.3	▲6.4
Democratic	Gina Trish	20,200	18.3	▲4.8
Green	Aaron Hyndman	1,568	1.4	N/A
Green	Kenny Collins	1,518	1.4	▼2.9
Total votes		'110,435'	'100.0'	

New Jersey General Assembly
Preceded by Gail Phoebus	Member of the New Jersey General Assembly from the 24th District; January 9, 2018-Present; With: Parker Space	Succeeded by Incumbent
