= Steve Oroho =

Member of the New Jersey Senate (born 1958)

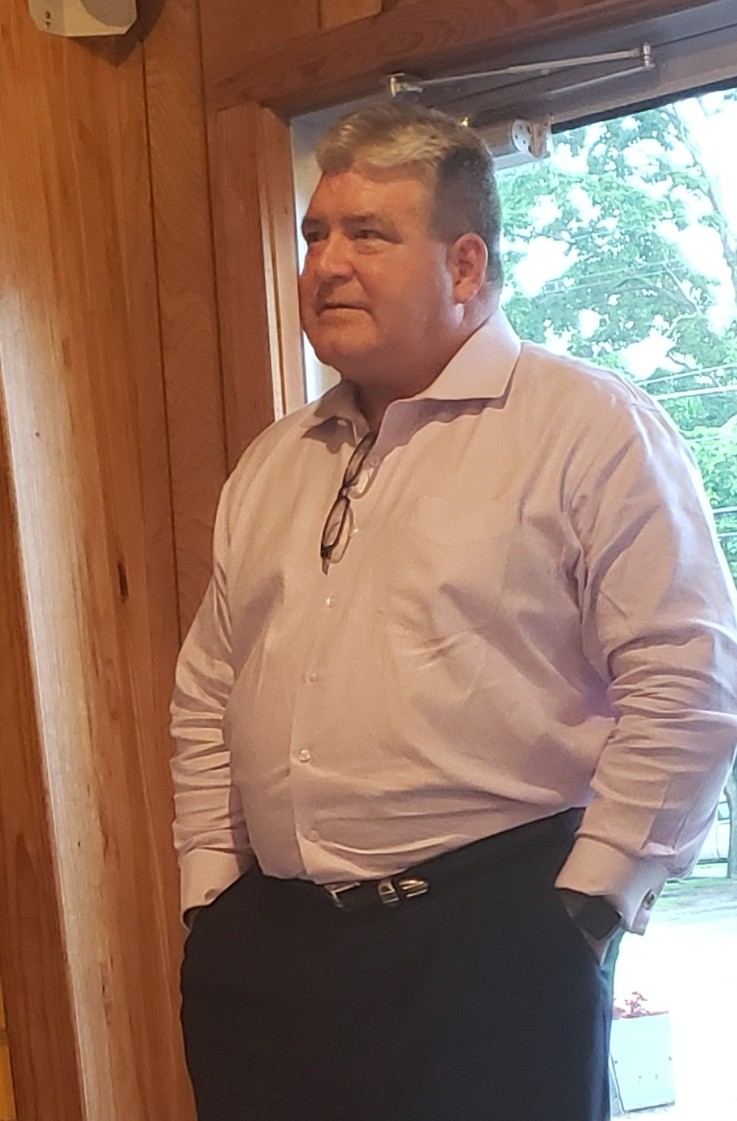

Member of the New Jersey Senate from the 24th district
- In office January 8, 2008 – January 9, 2024
- Preceded by: Robert E. Littell
- Succeeded by: Parker Space

Minority Leader of the New Jersey Senate
- In office January 11, 2022 – July 1, 2023
- Preceded by: Thomas Kean Jr.
- Succeeded by: Anthony M. Bucco

Personal details
- Born: July 26, 1958 (age 68) New York City, New York, U.S.
- Party: Republican
- Education: Saint Francis University (BS)
- Website: Party website Legislative website

Steven V. Oroho (born July 26, 1958) is an American Republican Party politician, who served in the New Jersey Senate from January 8, 2008, to January 9. 2024, where he represented the 24th Legislative District. Oroho served as State Senate Minority Leader after being elected during a State Senate Republicans Caucus meeting, replacing Thomas Kean Jr.

Oroho announced in January 2023 that he would not seek another term in the November 2023 general election. On July 1, 2023, he stepped down as Senate Minority Leader.

== Early life and education ==
Born in Brooklyn and raised in West Milford, New Jersey, Oroho graduated from West Milford High School in 1976 and from Saint Francis University in 1980.

== New Jersey Senate ==
=== Elections ===
==== 2007 election ====
Oroho announced in 2007 that he would seek the Republican nomination for the Senate seat being vacated by retiring Senator Robert Littell. With Littell's endorsement, he ran in a competitive primary against Assemblyman Guy Gregg. Oroho out-raised Gregg during the primary campaign. Oroho sought to portray himself as a small government conservative during the campaign. He won the primary and the general election in the Republican 24th district.

==== 2021 election ====
Republican Daniel Cruz challenged Oroho in the June 3, 2021 primary.

=== Tenure ===
Oroho opposes same-sex marriage and has been the senate sponsor of legislation that would allow a public vote in the form of a ballot question to determine whether it should be legalized or banned in New Jersey. He is the primary sponsor of that legislation in the Senate. In June 2009 he was one of seven senators to vote against putting open space bond question on the November ballot. Oroho serves in the Senate on the Budget and Appropriations Committee and the Economic Growth Committee. He served on the Franklin Borough Council from 2001 to 2006 and on the Sussex County Board of Chosen Freeholders from 2005 to 2007. In 2018 Oroho made calls to bring back the death penalty in New Jersey.

=== Committees ===
- Joint Budget Oversight
- New Jersey Legislative Select Oversight
- Budget and Appropriations
- Economic Growth

=== District 24 ===
Each of the 40 districts in the New Jersey Legislature has one representative in the New Jersey Senate and two members in the New Jersey General Assembly. The representatives from the 24th District for the 2022—23 Legislative Session are:

- Senator Steve Oroho (R)
- Assemblyman Parker Space (R)
- Assemblyman Hal Wirths (R)

== Electoral history ==
=== New Jersey Senate ===
New Jersey general election, 2021
Party	Candidate	Votes	%	±%
Republican	Steve Oroho (Incumbent)	56,628	69.4	▲8.4
Democratic	Frederick P. Cook	23,240	30.6	▼8.3
Total votes		'75,868'	'100.0'	

New Jersey general election, 2017
Party	Candidate	Votes	%	±%
Republican	Steve Oroho (Incumbent)	35,641	61.0	▼9.4
Democratic	Jennifer Hamilton	22,760	39.0	▲9.4
Total votes		'58,401'	'100.0'	

New Jersey general election, 2013
Party	Candidate	Votes	%	±%
Republican	Steve Oroho (Incumbent)	38,819	70.4	▲4.4
Democratic	Richard D. Tomko	16,292	29.6	▼4.4
Total votes		'55,111'	'100.0'	

New Jersey general election, 2011
Party	Candidate	Votes	%
Republican	Steve Oroho (Incumbent)	21,044	66.0
Democratic	Edwin Selby	10,837	34.0
Total votes		31,881	100.0

New Jersey general election, 2007
Party	Candidate	Votes	%	±%
Republican	Steve Oroho	31,143	69.5	▲1.4
Democratic	Edwin Selby	13,694	30.5	▼1.4
Total votes		'44,837'	'100.0'	

New Jersey Senate
Preceded by Robert Littell	Member of the New Jersey Senate from the 24th district 2008–2024	Succeeded by Parker Space
Preceded by Thomas Kean Jr.	Minority Leader of the New Jersey Senate; 2022–2023	Succeeded by Anthony M. Bucco
