= 2005 New Jersey General Assembly election =

- November 8, 2005

All 80 seats to the General Assembly 41 seats needed for a majority
- Turnout: 49% (▲15pp)
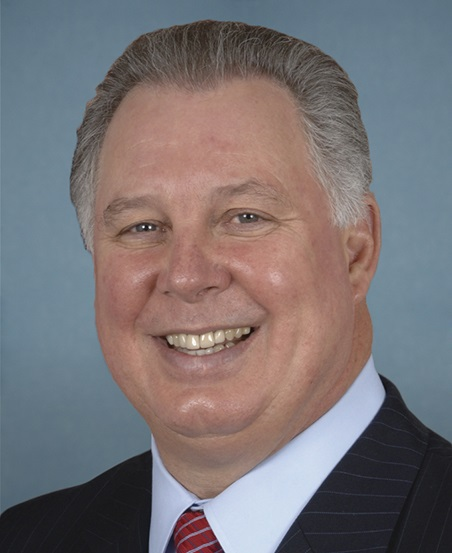

	Majority party	Minority party
Leader	Albio Sires (stepped down)	Alex DeCroce
Party	Democratic	Republican
Leader since	January 8, 2002	January 12, 2004
Leader's seat	33rd (West New York)	26th (Parsippany–Troy Hills)
Last election	47	33
Seats won	49	31
Seat change	▲2	▼2
- Results: Democratic gain Republican gain Democratic hold Republican hold
Speaker before election
Albio Sires
Democratic
Elected Speaker
Joseph J. Roberts
Democratic

The 2005 New Jersey General Assembly elections were held on November 8, 2005, for all 80 seats in the lower house of the New Jersey Legislature. The election coincided with a gubernatorial election where Democrat Jon Corzine won. Democrats held a 47-33 majority in the lower house prior to the election. The members of the New Jersey Legislature are chosen from 40 electoral districts. Each district elects one State Senator and two State Assembly members. New Jersey uses coterminous legislative districts for both its State Senate and General Assembly.

The Democratic Party won a 49–31 majority. Democrats were able to flip one seat in the 1st, 2nd, and 36th districts. Republicans flipped one seat in the 12th. This is the last time any seats in North Jersey changed parties until 2025.

== Incumbents not seeking re-election ==
=== Democrats ===
- Robert J. Smith II, District 4
- Mary Previte, District 6
- Peter C. Eagler, District 34
- Loretta Weinberg, District 37

=== Republicans ===
- Joseph Azzolina, District 13
- Connie Myers, District 23
- Paul DiGaetano, District 36

== Summary of results by district ==
Legislative District	Position	Incumbent	Party	Elected Assembly Member	Party
1st	1	John C. Gibson	Republican	Nelson Albano	Democrat
1st	2	Jeff Van Drew	Democrat	Jeff Van Drew	Democratic
2nd	1	Kirk W. Conover	Republican	Jim Whelan	Democratic
2nd	2	Francis J. Blee	Republican	Francis J. Blee	Republican
3rd	1	John J. Burzichelli	Democrat	John J. Burzichelli	Democrat
3rd	2	Douglas H. Fisher	Democrat	Douglas H. Fisher	Democrat
4th	1	Robert J. Smith II	Democrat	Paul D. Moriarty	Democrat
4th	2	David R. Mayer	Democrat	David R. Mayer	Democrat
5th	1	Nilsa Cruz-Perez	Democrat	Nilsa Cruz-Perez	Democrat
5th	2	Joseph J. Roberts	Democrat	Joseph J. Roberts	Democrat
6th	1	Louis Greenwald	Democrat	Louis Greenwald	Democrat
6th	2	Mary Previte	Democrat	Pamela Rosen Lampitt	Democrat
7th	1	Herb Conaway	Democrat	Herb Conaway	Democrat
7th	2	Jack Conners	Democrat	Jack Conners	Democrat
8th	1	Francis Bodine	Republican	Francis Bodine	Republican
8th	2	Larry Chatzidakis	Republican	Larry Chatzidakis	Republican
9th	1	Brian E. Rumpf	Republican	Brian E. Rumpf	Republican
9th	2	Christopher J. Connors	Republican	Christopher J. Connors	Republican
10th	1	James W. Holzapfel	Republican	James W. Holzapfel	Republican
10th	2	David W. Wolfe	Republican	David W. Wolfe	Republican
11th	1	Sean Kean	Republican	Sean Kean	Republican
11th	2	Steve Corodemus	Republican	Steve Corodemus	Republican
12th	1	Robert Lewis Morgan	Democratic	Jennifer Beck	Republican
12th	2	Michael J. Panter	Democratic	Michael J. Panter	Democratic
13th	1	Samuel D. Thompson	Republican	Samuel D. Thompson	Republican
13th	2	Amy Handlin	Republican	Amy Handlin	Republican
14th	1	Bill Baroni	Republican	Bill Baroni	Republican
14th	2	Linda Greenstein	Democrat	Linda Greenfield	Democrat
15th	1	Bonnie Watson Coleman	Democrat	Bonnie Watson Coleman	Democrat
15th	2	Reed Gusciora	Democrat	Reed Gusciora	Democrat
16th	1	Peter Biondi	Republican	Peter Biondi	Republican
16th	2	Christopher Bateman	Republican	Christopher Bateman	Republican
17th	1	Upendra Chivukula	Democrat	Upendra Chivukula	Democrat
17th	2	Joseph V. Egan	Democrat	Joseph V. Egan	Democrat
18th	1	Peter Barnes	Democrat	Peter Barnes	Democrat
18th	2	Patrick J. Diegnan	Democrat	Patrick J. Diegnan	Democrat
19th	1	Joseph Vas	Democrat	Joseph Vas	Democrat
19th	2	John Wisniewski	Democrat	John Wisniewski	Democrat
20th	1	Neil M. Cohen	Democrat	Neil M. Cohen	Democrat
20th	2	Joseph Cryan	Democrat	Joseph Cryan	Democrat
21st	1	Jon Bramnick	Republican	Jon Bramnick	Republican
21st	2	Eric Munoz	Republican	Eric Munoz	Republican
22nd	1	Linda Stender	Democrat	Linda Stender	Democrat
22nd	2	Jerry Green	Democrat	Jerry Green	Democrat
23rd	1	Michael J. Doherty	Republican	Michael J. Doherty	Republican
23rd	2	Connie Myers	Republican	Marcia Karrow	Republican
24th	1	Guy Gregg	Republican	Guy Gregg	Republican
24th	2	Alison Littell McHose	Republican	Alison Littell McHose	Republican
25th	1	Rick Merkt	Republican	Rick Merkt	Republican
25th	2	Michael Patrick Carroll	Republican	Michael Patrick Carroll	Republican
26th	1	Alex DeCroce	Republican	Alex DeCroce	Republican
26th	2	Joseph Pennacchio	Republican	Joseph Pennacchio	Republican
27th	1	John F. McKeon	Democrat	John F. McKeon	Democrat
27th	2	Mims Hackett	Democrat	Mims Hackett	Democrat
28th	1	Craig A. Stanley	Democrat	Craig A. Stanley	Democrat
28th	2	Donald Tucker	Democrat	Donald Tucker	Democrat
29th	1	William D. Payne	Democrat	William D. Payne	Democrat
29th	2	Wilfredo Caraballo	Democrat	Wilfredo Caraballo	Democrat
30th	1	Joseph Malone	Republican	Joseph Malone	Republican
30th	2	Ronald S. Dancer	Republican	Ronald S. Dancer	Republican
31st	1	Anthony Chiappone	Democrat	Louis Manzo	Democrat
31st	2	Charles Epps	Democrat	Charles Epps	Democrat
32nd	1	Joan M. Quigley	Democrat	Joan Quigley	Democrat
32nd	2	Vincent Prieto	Democrat	Vincent Prieto	Democrat
33rd	1	Albio Sires	Democrat	Albio Sires	Democrat
33rd	2	Brian Stack	Democrat	Brian Stack	Democrat
34th	1	Peter C. Eagler	Democrat	Thomas P. Giblin	Democrat
34th	2	Sheila Oliver	Democrat	Sheila Oliver	Democrat
35th	1	Nellie Pou	Democrat	Nellie Pou	Democrat
35th	2	Alfred Steele	Democrat	Alfred Steele	Democrat
36th	1	Paul DiGaetano	Republican	Gary Schaer	Democrat
36th	2	Frederick Scalera	Democrat	Frederick Scalera	Democrat
37th	1	Gordon M. Johnson	Democrat	Gordon M. Johnson	Democrat
37th	2	Loretta Weinberg	Democrat	Valerie Huttle	Democrat
38th	1	Joan Voss	Democrat	Joan Voss	Democrat
38th	2	Robert M. Gordon	Democrat	Robert M. Gordon	Democrat
39th	1	Charlotte Vandervalk	Republican	Charlotte Vandervalk	Republican
39th	2	John E. Rooney	Republican	John E. Rooney	Republican
40th	1	Kevin J. O'Toole	Republican	Kevin J. O'Toole	Republican
40th	2	David C. Russo	Republican	David Russo	Republican

=== Close races ===
Districts where the difference of total votes between the top-two parties was under 10%:

1. District 2, 3.6% gain D
2. District 11, 3.4%
3. District 12, 0.93%
4. District 23, 7.1%
5. District 14, 1.0%
6. District 25, 9.8%
7. District 39, 9.4%

== List of races ==
=== District 1 ===
New Jersey general election, 2005
Party	Candidate	Votes	%	±%
Democratic	Jeff Van Drew	41,381	35.8	▲9.3
Democratic	Nelson Albano	32,500	28.1	▲7.4
Republican	John C. Gibson	25,324	21.9	▼3.7
Republican	George Cecola	16,338	14.1	▼10.2
Total votes		115,593	100.0	

=== District 2 ===
New Jersey general election, 2005
Party	Candidate	Votes	%	±%
Democratic	Jim Whelan	29,906	27.6	▲9.8
Republican	Frank Blee	27,846	25.7	▼5.3
Democratic	Damon Tyner	26,264	24.2	▲6.8
Republican	Kirk W. Conover	22,795	21.0	▼8.1
Socialist	Sharon Chiorazzo	832	0.8	N/A
Socialist	Willie Norwood	665	0.6	N/A
Total votes		108,308	100.0	

=== District 3 ===
New Jersey general election, 2005
Party	Candidate	Votes	%	±%
Democratic	John Burzichelli	35,339	29.6	▲4.3
Democratic	Douglas H. Fisher	35,265	29.5	▲4.1
Republican	Phillip S. Rhudy	24,140	20.2	▼3.2
Republican	James W. Zee III	23,297	19.5	▼3.0
Constitution	John Leone	1,535	1.3	N/A
Total votes		119,576	100.0	

=== District 4 ===
New Jersey general election, 2005
Party	Candidate	Votes	%	±%
Democratic	Paul D. Moriarty	31,976	31.8	▲4.5
Democratic	David R. Mayer	31,948	31.8	▲4.8
Republican	Frank Winters	18,908	18.8	▼4.1
Republican	Corey Ahart	17,597	17.5	▼5.4
Total votes		100,429	100.0	

=== District 5 ===
New Jersey general election, 2005
Party	Candidate	Votes	%	±%
Democratic	Joe Roberts	29,893	45.4	▲12.9
Democratic	Nilsa I. Cruz-Perez	27,955	42.5	▲12.0
Green	Richard L. Giovanoni	3,429	5.2	N/A
Green	Mark Heacock	3,386	5.1	N/A
Libertarian	Kevin Ferrizzi	1,131	1.7	N/A
Total votes		65,794	100.0	

=== District 6 ===
New Jersey general election, 2005
Party	Candidate	Votes	%	±%
Democratic	Louis D. Greenwald	38,211	31.3	▲2.5
Democratic	Pamela Rosen Lampitt	34,961	28.6	▲0.2
Republican	JoAnn R. Gurenlian	25,365	20.8	▲1.4
Republican	Marc Fleischner	23,587	19.3	▼0.2
Total votes		122,124	100.0	

=== District 7 ===
New Jersey general election, 2005
Party	Candidate	Votes	%	±%
Democratic	Herb Conaway	36,221	32.8	▲6.6
Democratic	Jack Conners	35,562	32.2	▲6.1
Republican	Joe Donnelly	19,902	18.0	▼6.4
Republican	Mike Savala	18,718	17.0	▼6.3
Total votes		110,403	100.0	

=== District 8 ===
New Jersey general election, 2005
Party	Candidate	Votes	%	±%
Republican	Francis L. Bodine	37,300	29.5	▼4.1
Republican	Larry Chatzidakis	35,986	28.4	▼4.3
Democratic	Donald G. Hartman	26,377	20.8	▲3.5
Democratic	Sandy Weinstein	26,153	20.7	▲4.4
Independent	John J. White	751	0.6	N/A
Total votes		126,567	100.0	

=== District 9 ===
New Jersey general election, 2005
Party	Candidate	Votes	%	±%
Republican	Christopher J. Connors	47,863	32.1	▼0.6
Republican	Brian E. Rumpf	44,761	30.0	▲1.3
Democratic	Dolores J. Coulter	29,365	19.7	▲0.2
Democratic	James Den Uyl	27,060	18.2	▼0.9
Total votes		149,049	100.0	

=== District 10 ===
New Jersey general election, 2005
Party	Candidate	Votes	%	±%
Republican	David W. Wolfe	40,660	32.3	▲0.4
Republican	Jim Holzapfel	39,981	31.7	▲1.2
Democratic	Lawrence Jones	22,398	17.8	▲0.3
Democratic	Joni Jones	22,312	17.7	▲0.6
Socialist	Scott Baier	584	0.5	N/A
Total votes		125,935	100.0	

=== District 11 ===
New Jersey general election, 2005
Party	Candidate	Votes	%	±%
Republican	Sean Kean	31,527	26.0	▼2.9
Republican	Steve Corodemus	31,136	25.7	▼4.6
Democratic	Matt Doherty	29,489	24.3	▲6.6
Democratic	Jim Reilly	29,051	24.0	▲7.0
Total votes		121,203	100.0	

=== District 12 ===
New Jersey general election, 2005
Party	Candidate	Votes	%	±%
Republican	Jennifer Beck	31,418	24.8	▲0.8
Democratic	Michael J. Panter	30,466	24.01	▼2.8
Republican	Declan O'Scanlon Jr.	30,401	23.96	▲1.1
Democratic	Robert L. Morgan	30,228	23.82	▼2.6
Green	Ann Napolitano	2,306	1.8	N/A
Green	Judith Stanton	2,052	1.6	N/A
Total votes		126,871	100.0	

=== District 13 ===
New Jersey general election, 2005
Party	Candidate	Votes	%	±%
Republican	Amy Handlin	29,405	25.9	▲1.8
Republican	Samuel D. Thompson	29,326	25.9	▲1.5
Democratic	William E. Flynn	25,814	22.8	▼1.0
Democratic	Michael Dasaro	24,824	21.9	▼1.1
Green	Mike Hall	2,061	1.8	▼0.6
Green	Greg Orr	1,899	1.7	▼0.6
Total votes		113,329	100.0	

=== District 14 ===
New Jersey general election, 2005
Party	Candidate	Votes	%	±%
Republican	Bill Baroni	37,241	27.7	▼0.2
Democratic	Linda R. Greenstein	35,816	26.7	▲1.2
Democratic	Daniel R. Benson	29,914	22.3	▲0.2
Republican	Michael D. Paquette	29,899	22.3	▼2.2
Libertarian	William Hunsicker	725	0.5	N/A
Libertarian	Jason M. Scheurer	714	0.5	N/A
Total votes		134,309	100.0	

=== District 15 ===
New Jersey general election, 2005
Party	Candidate	Votes	%	±%
Democratic	Bonnie Watson Coleman	31,929	34.7	▲3.6
Democratic	Reed Gusciora	30,773	33.5	▲3.7
Republican	Robert McCready	14,932	16.2	▼1.5
Republican	Tom Mavis	14,280	15.5	▼1.7
Total votes		91,914	100.0	

=== District 16 ===
New Jersey general election, 2005
Party	Candidate	Votes	%	±%
Republican	Christopher “Kip” Bateman	40,097	32.2	▼6.3
Republican	Pete Biondi	39,710	31.8	▼7.2
Democratic	Michael Goldberg	22,569	18.1	▲0.3
Democratic	Charles Eader	22,336	17.9	N/A
Total votes		124,712	100.0	

=== District 17 ===
New Jersey general election, 2005
Party	Candidate	Votes	%	±%
Democratic	Joseph V. Egan	29,601	34.0	▲5.2
Democratic	Upendra J. Chivukula	28,239	32.4	▲3.9
Republican	Catherine J. Barrier	15,748	18.1	▼1.5
Republican	Salim A. Nathoo	13,507	15.5	▼2.7
Total votes		87,095	100.0	

=== District 18 ===
New Jersey general election, 2005
Party	Candidate	Votes	%	±%
Democratic	Peter J. Barnes Jr	31,605	30.8	▲1.2
Democratic	Patrick J. Diegnan Jr	29,874	29.1	▲2.4
Republican	Daniel Epstein	20,639	20.1	▼2.9
Republican	Frank J. Coury	20,530	20.0	▼0.7
Total votes		102,648	100.0	

=== District 19 ===
New Jersey general election, 2005
Party	Candidate	Votes	%	±%
Democratic	John S. Wisniewski	28,999	34.8	▲2.5
Democratic	Joseph Vas	26,361	31.6	▲4.6
Republican	David J. Longenhagen	14,018	16.8	▼5.5
Republican	Reyes Ortega	13,952	16.7	▼1.7
Total votes		83,330	100.0	

=== District 20 ===
New Jersey general election, 2005
Party	Candidate	Votes	%	±%
Democratic	Neil M. Cohen	23,668	50.3	▲18.9
Democratic	Joseph Cryan	23,345	49.7	▲18.4
Total votes		47,013	100.0	

=== District 21 ===
New Jersey general election, 2005
Party	Candidate	Votes	%	±%
Republican	Eric Munoz	40,839	29.6	▼0.3
Republican	Jon Bramnick	40,123	29.1	▲0.2
Democratic	Bruce Bergen	28,595	20.7	▼0.5
Democratic	Steven Merman	28,319	20.5	▲3.1
Total votes		137,876	100.0	

=== District 22 ===
New Jersey general election, 2005
Party	Candidate	Votes	%	±%
Democratic	Linda Stender	30,076	32.3	▲3.4
Democratic	Jerry Green	28,194	30.3	▲3.0
Republican	Nancy Malool	18,365	19.7	▼0.6
Republican	Elyse Bochicchio-Medved	16,465	17.7	▼2.3
Total votes		93,100	100.0	

=== District 23 ===
New Jersey general election, 2005
Party	Candidate	Votes	%	±%
Republican	Michael J. Doherty	41,753	31.8	▲1.5
Republican	Marcia A. Karrow	38,623	29.4	▼1.5
Democratic	Janice L. Kovach	27,485	20.9	▲0.6
Democratic	Scott McDonald	23,387	17.8	▼0.7
Total votes		131,248	100.0	

=== District 24 ===
New Jersey general election, 2005
Party	Candidate	Votes	%	±%
Republican	Alison Littell McHose	37,318	33.6	▼5.4
Republican	Guy R. Gregg	36,615	33.0	▼8.3
Democratic	Brian S. Murphy	18,643	16.8	N/A
Democratic	Thomas B. Boyle	18,328	16.5	▼3.2
Total votes		110,904	100.0	

=== District 25 ===
New Jersey general election, 2005
Party	Candidate	Votes	%	±%
Republican	Richard A. Merkt	32,089	28.1	▼9.0
Republican	Michael P. Carroll	30,636	26.8	▼10.8
Democratic	Thomas Jackson	25,751	22.6	▼2.8
Democratic	Janice Schindler	25,709	22.5	N/A
Total votes		114,185	100.0	

=== District 26 ===
New Jersey general election, 2005
Party	Candidate	Votes	%	±%
Republican	Alex DeCroce	35,646	30.2	▼2.5
Republican	Joseph Pennacchio	34,331	29.1	▼3.1
Democratic	Kathleen Lynch-McCabe	23,795	20.1	▲2.2
Democratic	Avery Hart	22,881	19.4	▲2.2
Libertarian	Anthony Pio Costa	833	0.7	N/A
Libertarian	Kenneth Kaplan	660	0.6	N/A
Total votes		118,146	100.0	

=== District 27 ===
New Jersey general election, 2005
Party	Candidate	Votes	%	±%
Democratic	John F. McKeon	35,651	34.6	▲2.1
Democratic	Mims Hackett Jr.	33,323	32.4	▲1.6
Republican	Michael J. Rizzo	17,227	16.7	▼1.3
Republican	Charles A. Rosen	16,785	16.3	▼1.1
Total votes		102,986	100.0	

=== District 28 ===
New Jersey general election, 2005
Party	Candidate	Votes	%	±%
Democratic	Donald Tucker	27,030	39.6	▲2.2
Democratic	Craig A. Stanley	26,890	39.4	▲3.2
Republican	Ana Pizutelli	6,928	10.2	▼2.8
Republican	Barbara Dennis	6,820	10.0	▼3.4
Socialist Workers	Michael Ortega	513	0.8	N/A
Total votes		68,181	100.0	

=== District 29 ===
New Jersey general election, 2005
Party	Candidate	Votes	%	±%
Democratic	William D. Payne	24,325	45.3	▲2.5
Democratic	Wilfredo Caraballo	23,571	43.9	▲3.3
Republican	Miguel A. Sanabria	2,947	5.5	▼2.9
Republican	Elaine L. Guarino	2,800	5.2	▼3.0
Total votes		53,643	100.0	

=== District 30 ===
New Jersey general election, 2005
Party	Candidate	Votes	%	±%
Republican	Joseph R. Malone III	36,286	32.6	▼0.4
Republican	Ronald S. Dancer	35,794	32.1	▲0.6
Democratic	Jeffrey Williamson	20,053	18.0	▼0.6
Democratic	Marvin Krakower	19,235	17.3	▲0.4
Total votes		111,368	100.0	

=== District 31 ===
New Jersey general election, 2005
Party	Candidate	Votes	%	±%
Democratic	Louis M. Manzo	26,179	40.9	▲0.8
Democratic	Charles T. Epps Jr	24,983	39.1	▼0.2
Republican	Andrew Wirtz	6,413	10.0	▲1.8
Republican	Rita A. Howard	6,356	9.9	▲2.4
Total votes		63,931	100.0	

=== District 32 ===
New Jersey general election, 2005
Party	Candidate	Votes	%	±%
Democratic	Joan Quigley	25,743	38.9	▲0.3
Democratic	Vincent Prieto	25,444	38.5	▼0.2
Republican	Edward O'Neill	7,161	10.8	▲1.4
Republican	Kenneth C. Marano	6,977	10.5	▲1.1
Politicians Are Crooks	Herbert H. Shaw	847	1.3	N/A
Total votes		66,172	100.0	

=== District 33 ===
New Jersey general election, 2005
Party	Candidate	Votes	%	±%
Democratic	Brian P. Stack	29,452	40.8	▼1.1
Democratic	Albio Sires	28,456	39.4	▼0.8
Republican	Richard Valdes	6,777	9.4	▲1.3
Republican	Alejandria Rodriguez	6,651	9.2	▲1.1
Vote Mango	Christopher Mango	854	1.2	N/A
Total votes		72,190	100.0	

=== District 34 ===
New Jersey general election, 2005
Party	Candidate	Votes	%	±%
Democratic	Sheila Y. Oliver	32,501	50.9	▲19.9
Democratic	Thomas P. Giblin	31,372	49.1	▲15.9
Total votes		63,873	100.0	

=== District 35 ===
New Jersey general election, 2005
Party	Candidate	Votes	%	±%
Democratic	Alfred Steele	23,747	34.8	▲2.0
Democratic	Nellie Pou	23,372	34.3	▲2.4
Republican	Deborah Shortway	10,477	15.4	▼2.7
Republican	Rinaldo M. D'Argenio	10,397	15.2	▼2.0
Libertarian	Louis R. Jasikoff	191	0.3	N/A
Total votes		68,184	100.0	

=== District 36 ===
New Jersey general election, 2005
Party	Candidate	Votes	%	±%
Democratic	Frederick Scalera	26,606	32.1	▲7.3
Democratic	Gary Schaer	24,645	29.7	▲6.3
Republican	Jose M. Sandoval	15,414	18.6	▼7.5
Republican	Louis G. Aloia	15,399	18.6	▼4.2
Green	Stewart Kautsch	793	1.0	N/A
Total votes		82,857	100.0	

=== District 37 ===
New Jersey general election, 2005
Party	Candidate	Votes	%	±%
Democratic	Gordon M. Johnson	35,554	35.5	▲4.0
Democratic	Valerie Vainieri Huttle	35,246	35.2	▲2.3
Republican	Frank J. Cifarelli	14,496	14.5	▼2.0
Republican	Norman Gorlyn	13,932	13.9	▼2.4
Conservative	Thomas A. Phelan	787	0.8	N/A
Total votes		100,015	100.0	

=== District 38 ===
New Jersey general election, 2005
Party	Candidate	Votes	%	±%
Democratic	Robert M. Gordon	32,389	30.5	▲3.6
Democratic	Joan M. Voss	31,886	30.0	▲4.6
Republican	Richard L. Miller	21,008	19.8	▼1.6
Republican	John J. Baldino	20,915	19.7	▼1.2
Total votes		106,198	100.0	

=== District 39 ===
New Jersey general election, 2005
Party	Candidate	Votes	%	±%
Republican	Charlotte Vandervalk	37,910	28.4	▼4.6
Republican	John E. Rooney	35,062	26.3	▼6.1
Democratic	Josephine Higgins	29,885	22.4	▲5.1
Democratic	Dennis Testa	29,825	22.3	▲5.0
Libertarian	James P. Conway	793	0.6	N/A
Total votes		133,475	100.0	

=== District 40 ===
New Jersey general election, 2005
Party	Candidate	Votes	%	±%
Republican	Kevin J. O'Toole	36,957	30.6	▼1.5
Republican	David C. Russo	36,820	30.5	▼1.8
Democratic	Jane Bidwell	24,117	20.0	▲3.1
Democratic	Ronald Beattie	22,732	18.8	▲1.8
Total votes		120,626	100.0	
