= Vitaly Borker =

Russian-American internet fraudster and cybercriminal

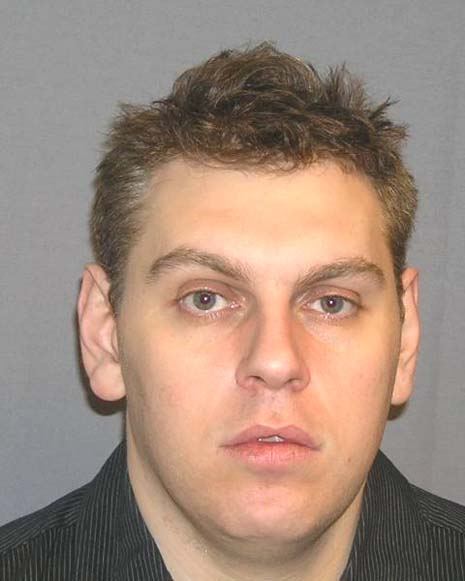
- Borker's US Marshals Service mugshot
- Born: 1975 or 1976 (age 50–51)
- Other names: Stanley Bolds; Tony Russo; Becky S
- Occupation: Businessman
- Known for: Internet crime and cyberbullying
- Status: Released on November 12, 2020
- Motive: Increase his site's Google PageRank by causing disgruntled customers to link to his site
- Convictions: Two counts of sending interstate threats one count of mail fraud one count of wire fraud
- Criminal charges: 2 counts of 875(c) Interstate Threats; 2 counts 1841 and 1843 Wire/Mail Fraud
- Penalty: 4 years of prison Nearly $100,000 restitution/fines

Vitaly Borker (born 1985 or 1986 in the former Soviet Union), known by pseudonyms Tony Russo, Stanley Bolds and Becky S, is an American felon who has twice served federal prison sentences for charges arising from how he ran his online eyeglass retail and repair sites, DecorMyEyes and OpticsFast. Customers who complained about poor service and misfilled orders for high-end designer eyewear were insulted, harassed, threatened (sometimes physically) and sometimes made the victim of small scams. After going into online retail following a short career as a computer programmer for several Wall Street firms, Borker encountered difficult customers who, he later said, were rude, lied to him and cost him money unnecessarily. He decided to be rude and unscrupulous with them in return, and learned to his surprise that on the Internet there was no such thing as bad publicity since the many posts with links to his site on complaint sites such as Ripoff Report appeared to drive traffic to his sites due to how Google's PageRank algorithm worked at that time, putting his site higher in results for searches on brand names than even those brands' websites, and making him money.

When New York Times reporter David Segal investigated the site in 2010, Borker freely explained this business model to him when Segal came to visit his house in the Brooklyn neighborhood of Sheepshead Bay, where Borker questioned the notion that the customer is always right and said he "like[d] the craziness." A month later Borker was arrested by federal postal inspectors and charged with mail fraud, wire fraud and making interstate threats. He eventually pleaded guilty to fraud charges and making threats and was sentenced to prison for four years. Google and other websites whose flaws he had exploited in running DecorMyEyes also changed their practices and tightened security procedures.

Before entering prison, Borker and a friend had begun setting up another website, OpticsFast, offering not only eyeglasses for sale but repair services. After his 2015 release, he went back to his former business practices, which he mostly hid from his probation officer. Two years later, Segal reported on Borker's return in the Times, and Borker was again arrested and charged with wire and mail fraud associated with alleged harassment and abuse as operator of OpticsFast. In February 2018, he was sentenced to two years in prison for violation of his 2015 parole. Following a plea deal for the 2017 charges, he was later sentenced in 2019 to two years in prison followed by three years of supervised release, a $50,000 fine, and a $300 special assessment.

Following Borker's release in late 2020, Segal reported in the Times in 2021 that Borker appeared to have returned to selling eyeglasses online, under other personal and business names, and harassing dissatisfied customers through a new site called Eyeglassesdepot. If true, this would be a violation of a condition of his 2021 parole that he avoid any involvement in online retailing. In early 2022 he was arrested again on fraud charges related to the new site; he pleaded guilty to wire fraud a year later.

== Biography ==
Borker told New York Times reporter David Segal in 2010 that he was born in Russia and moved to the United States with his parents as a child; exactly how old he was at the time is not definitely known. After graduating from Edward R. Murrow High School in 1989 and John Jay College of Criminal Justice in 1997 he began training as a police officer, working as a cadet in the office of a unit that patrolled public housing in Brooklyn. He soon changed his mind about his career path and enrolled in a school to learn programming.

Although all classes were taught in English, all the students and teachers at the school were also all Russian immigrants, Borker recalls. Students would be taught the bare minimum that would get them hired, and then the school would help them fabricate a résumé and work history to assure that they did. "There were a lot of schools like this," he said a decade later. "They've all been shut down."

Borker first went to work for a variety of Wall Street financial firms, including Lehman Brothers, where he worked on the systems that administered the accounts of mutual fund shareholders. Dissatisfied with the pay, Borker took a friend up on his side offer to create an online version of his eyeglass store. He continued running the online eyeglass store while he worked for Lehman, drawing lawsuits, and judgements, from luxury brands like Chanel for selling counterfeit glasses. Shortly before the bankruptcy of Lehman Brothers in the 2008 financial crisis, he left to go into online retailing full time.

== DecorMyEyes ==
The website became DecorMyEyes. Borker became disillusioned with his customers, who he says lied and cost him unnecessarily by changing their minds. "I stopped caring", he says, and began responding rudely to them. This led to postings on review websites disparaging him, which, to his amazement, put DecorMyEyes near the top of Google search results due to the many links to his site. Seeing the value of this perverse incentive, Borker began purposely responding to dissatisfied customers with threats and insults. It was later reported that the site had made Borker $3.2 million in one year.

Customers of DecorMyEyes posted numerous reports of receiving threats of physical violence, abuse, poor service and overcharges on websites such as ResellerRatings, where DecorMyEyes had, as of 2010, a lifetime rating of 1.39/10 from 79 reviews. One customer told authorities that after he complained someone had called his employer and accused him of dealing drugs. According to Borker, each bad review with a link boosted his site's PageRank, meaning that the site came to the top of Google's ratings for many of the products he sold. He showed the Times that his site actually came up higher than designer Christian Audigier's in a search on the designer's name. While a direct Google search for "DecorMyEyes" elicits the site and its many negative reviews, searching for individual products and brands does not.

The reason, cited by an anonymous Google publicist, is that the large number of links to DecorMyEyes from consumer complaint sites such as Ripoff Report cause DecorMyEyes to rank high in Google search results. In 2008 Borker made a post as "Stanley" on Get Satisfaction and other websites like it thanking users there for the links and the traffic they had brought him. When the website's administrators sent him an email suggesting he could work with them to work things out, he replied with a photograph of his hand with middle finger extended.

Borker said most of his customers were satisfied; he called those who were not "psychos". He questioned the notion that the customer is always right. "[N]ot here, you understand?" he told Segal. "Why is the merchant always wrong? Can the customer ever be wrong? Is that not possible?" He allowed that the stress might well be affecting his health, but doubted he would walk away from the site. "I like the craziness. This works for me", he said, likening himself to radio shock jock Howard Stern.

Borker used other websites in his business. He often sourced his glasses from sellers on eBay and told them simply to ship them to his customers' address. If the seller declined, as several did when the address had not been verified by PayPal, he left a negative review on their page, which many wanted to avoid. When sellers blocked Borker, he registered under a different name; after this was reported, eBay barred Borker from the site permanently and instituted other reforms to prevent such tactics and identify abusive buyers. Borker also maintained a store on Amazon.com under a different name, where he was much more fastidious in his dealings with customers, since that platform was willing to remove sellers if it got enough customer complaints.

Since credit card companies, in their agreements with sellers, can cancel the service if they receive enough "chargebacks" or buyer disputes every month, Borker told the Times he tried to make sure he avoided alienating too many. Some customers say that he threatened them to drop the dispute, sometimes suggesting he was willing to employ physical violence and emailing them pictures of their houses from Google Earth. One told Segal that her bank dropped the dispute and reinstated her charge after a woman claiming to be her called and said she no longer wished to do so.

Google responded to the Times story by writing an algorithm that "detects the merchant from the Times article along with hundreds of other merchants that, in our opinion, provide an extremely poor user experience" and significantly reduces their search visibility on product searches. (Note: According to Google, the links from complaint sites were actually not the issue since many of them included the rel=nofollow setting, which would have told PageRank to discount them. The company would not disclose the actual way Borker and DecorMyEyes ranked so high in search results, nor specifics of the solution it implemented, to prevent other bad actors from being able to better game its search results. According to Danny Sullivan, formerly of Search Engine Watch, the solution to the problem of bad publicity being as good as good publicity for search engine optimization was to include consumer reviews alongside links to e-commerce websites in search results. Google responded that while it was still considering that option, it was not certain that it would work.) MasterCard had dropped DecorMyEyes in 2009 due to excessive chargebacks. Borker regained access to their network by using a different bank. The company told the Times that he should not have been able to do this as he was supposed to have been placed on an internal blacklist; in the wake of the story it told Segal that it had not only put him on that list but increased its safeguards to make sure that those who were supposed to be blacklisted were. Borker responded that it was impossible to shut people down completely online. "I'd use the name of a friend of mine", he suggested. "Give him 1 percent."

== 2010 arrest and federal charges ==
A week after the Times story Borker was arrested by agents of the United States Postal Inspection Service on charges of mail fraud, wire fraud, making interstate threats and cyberstalking, and arraigned in the United States District Court in Manhattan. Bail was denied on the basis that he was a threat to the community. A search of his house turned up a stock of counterfeit eyeglasses, and fake 8mm replica guns. State charges were dismissed. After months of confinement in the Metropolitan Detention Center in Brooklyn, Borker was freed in April 2011 upon posting $1 million bond and accepting restrictions that included accepting surveillance by a security guard in his home, at a cost to him of a thousand dollars a day.

In May 2011, Borker pleaded guilty in Federal District Court in Manhattan to two counts of interstate communication of threats, one count of mail fraud and one count of wire fraud. In September 2012, Borker was sentenced to four years in federal prison and ordered to pay nearly $100,000 in fines and restitution. He was released four years later.

== 2017: OpticsFast ==
Before his imprisonment, Borker had a friend, Michael Voller, create a successor site, OpticsFast, to continue the business—with another friend's name on the incorporation papers—which he later reassumed control of after his release, offering this time to repair glasses (Note: Most of what Borker and Voller claimed on the site—that they had an in-house shop with talented experts in eyeglass repair that did work for other companies as well, and as such they never shipped any glasses sent them to third parties—they later admitted in court proceedings to be entirely false. No other workers were hired, the two's own abilities in eyeglass repair were limited to their ability to use a screwdriver and pop out and reinsert lenses, and so they sent many of the glasses they received to actual repair shops, allowing them to then increase the price well over the initial estimate they had given.) as well as selling new ones. Members of Voller's family furthered the scheme by telling Borker's probation officer that he was working for their family business and fabricating documentation to support that. Borker resumed his tactics of selling customers cheap counterfeits of luxury brand eyewear and then insulting and harassing them if they complained or attempted to return or exchange the merchandise, again with the goal of driving traffic to his site through the links from online complaints, this time primarily on Yelp.

Borker is not known to have physically threatened customers during this period, although he did charge one for a mailing label he claimed to have printed after the customer decided to cancel his order, a tactic he later admitted was fraudulent when allocuting. Communications sent by Borker under the name "Becky S", Judge Paul G. Gardephe noted, were the source of many of the complaints lodged against OpticsFast. "[C]ustomers describe interactions with OpticsFast employees that appear irrational if not imbalanced", (Note: In one instance "Becky" told a customer who had canceled his repair order and been pressing for the return of his broken glasses that "[t]here will be a $25 fee for the time you wasted of mine for the last 3 days". In another, a customer who similarly changed his mind and asked for a return was told that the glasses had already been fixed and asked if he wanted them rebroken before they were returned.) he wrote in sentencing Borker. "Indeed, many of the customers who filed complaints appear to have done so more because of the disturbing nature of th[ose] interactions ... rather than because of any loss they suffered from doing business with OpticsFast."

Some customers did face offline harassment. A Southern California woman, who recognized the email she received as having come from someone involved with DecorMyEyes since it referenced an order she had made nearly a decade earlier, recalls being told on the phone by a person purporting to be a police officer that she needed to report to the police station at once as a civil harassment suit had been filed against her; she declined after asking why the police were involved if it was a civil matter. The credit card she had used to make her eyewear purchase was then used to make a series of purchases around Brooklyn.

The New York Times reported on Borker's apparent return, noting that OpticsFast had been active while he was in prison. Search engine expert Doug Pierce, consulted by the newspaper, found the code and HTML running the OpticsFast page to have been substantially similar to DecorMyEyes until 2016, when Borker was released. Both domains had the same owner, but since the sites had been active while Borker was imprisoned the Times could not say for certain that he was involved in the new site.

In May 2017, a month after the story ran, Borker was arrested again and charged with wire and mail fraud associated with alleged harassment and abuse as operator of OpticsFast. Voller, also originally indicted, turned state's evidence against Borker and had most charges dropped; he was sentenced to time served in late 2020. Borker has sued him and others in state court alleging breach of contract.

Joon Kim, acting United States attorney for the Southern District of New York said that "Borker's shameless brand of alleged abuse cannot be tolerated, and we are committed to protecting consumers from becoming victims of such criminal behavior". Borker's lawyer stated his client would "plead not guilty and defend himself against the charges", which carried a maximum penalty of 20 years imprisonment.

=== Plea and sentencing ===
In February 2018, Borker was sentenced to two years for violating parole after his release in 2015. The terms of his parole forbade him from lying to his parole officers, which he had done when he had repeatedly denied he had started another online eyewear retail site.

A month later, Borker pleaded guilty to wire and mail fraud charges in exchange for a reduced sentence. CNBC devoted an episode of American Greed to Borker in June. In April 2019, he was sentenced to two years in prison, (Note: Federal prosecutors had sought a 3–4-year sentence. Gardephe allowed the enhancements they sought under the Federal Sentencing Guidelines for Borker's role as a leader of the scheme and his failure to accept responsibility for his actions, evinced by a letter he wrote to Voller's sister late in 2018 promising to do everything possible to see that Voller, whom he alleged had exaggerated Borker's role in OpticsFast and minimized his own, went to prison for his role. But he denied three other enhancements: first, they had not offered sufficient proof that Borker's gains from the frauds he had allocuted to while pleading guilty were as high as they claimed in order to justify an upward variance from the applicable provisions of for his admitted offenses. Second, Borker had also made enough limited disclosures to his probation officer about working on the side for OpticsFast for the government to be unable to claim an enhancement to the sentence for obstructing justice on the basis that he deceived them about his employment. And lastly, the indictment had not provided notice that the government intended to seek sentencing enhancements for crimes committed while on pretrial release for other criminal charges.) to be followed by three years of supervised release, a $50,000 fine, and a $300 special assessment. He was released from prison in November 2020.

== 2021–22: Eyeglassesdepot ==
In 2021, the Times reported that Borker may have again returned to selling eyeglasses online and harassing dissatisfied customers, this time through a site named Eyeglassesdepot. Customers reported similar behavior, such as threats, insults and online doxxing, including not only their credit card numbers but the cards' security codes, when they complained or tried to return merchandise, and attempts to intimidate them into paying for printed mailing labels after they changed their mind. They said the company's representative identified himself as "Arsenio".

This time, Trustpilot hosted many of the negative reviews. The owner of Eyeglassesdepot seemed to more genuinely fear the consequences of bad reviews there. He followed up one customer's complaints about his behavior with a post claiming it was a fake review posted by a competing site, along with the complainant's home address and cell phone number. He also threatened to post multiple fake positive reviews for every negative one.

Trustpilot management investigated after receiving complaints, and found almost half of the positive reviews of Eyeglassesdepot were fake. It removed them and sent Eyeglassesdepot an email asking that it cease and desist from further such behavior. "Yeah whatever" read the reply.

Pierce believes that Eyeglassesdepot and OpticsFast, which look very similar and share common third-party tags, have the same owner. Pierce concluded, "Whoever created Eyeglassesdepot simply cloned OpticsFast, perhaps in the interest of saving time and money, and then made a few cosmetic changes". Pierce allowed that that individual may not have been Vitaly Borker, "But who else would steal the code from a website as notorious as OpticsFast?"

Borker's attorney denied that his client was Arsenio. If Borker were to be involved in any way with Eyeglassesdepot, that by itself would be enough to send him back to prison, since the terms of his most recent parole forbid him from any involvement whatsoever with online retail.

In February 2022, prosecutors announced that Borker had been arrested again, on one count each of mail fraud, wire fraud and aggravated identity theft, the latter stemming from his use of two other people's names while running Eyeglassesdepot. The Times noted that while he had apparently started it while still in a halfway house after his previous conviction, this time he seemed less audacious, content to merely sell used or counterfeit eyewear as new and genuine while not paying refunds, and provoking, threatening and abusing unhappy customers to a lesser degree than he had previously. In January 2023 he pled guilty to one count of wire fraud and was sentenced to 30 months in prison.

== Personal life ==
At the time of his first arrest, Borker was married and had a daughter born in 2008.

In 2019, during sentencing in the OpticsFast case, Gardephe noted that Borker had been diagnosed with narcissistic personality disorder, bipolar disorder and obsessive–compulsive disorder.

== See also ==
- Criticism of Google
- Google search optimization
- List of American Greed episodes
- List of Ukrainian Americans
