= John DiMaio =

American politician (born 1955)

Minority Leader of the New Jersey General Assembly
- Incumbent
- Assumed office January 11, 2022
- Preceded by: Jon Bramnick

Member of the New Jersey General Assembly from the 23rd district
- Incumbent
- Assumed office March 16, 2009 Serving with Erik Peterson
- Preceded by: Marcia A. Karrow

Member of the Warren County Board of Chosen Freeholders from the 2nd district
- In office December 13, 2000 – March 16, 2009
- Preceded by: Susan Dickley
- Succeeded by: Angelo Accetturo

Mayor of Hackettstown, New Jersey
- In office January 1, 1991 – December 31, 1999
- Preceded by: Patricia Harper
- Succeeded by: Roger Hines

Personal details
- Born: November 27, 1955 (age 70) Newton, New Jersey, U.S.
- Party: Democratic (Before 1995); Republican (1995–present)
- Spouse: Gina DiMaio
- Children: 2
- Website: Legislative website

John DiMaio (born November 27, 1955) is an American Republican Party politician, who was selected on February 21, 2009 to fill the New Jersey General Assembly seat for the 23rd legislative district vacated by Marcia A. Karrow, after Karrow filled the vacancy for the New Jersey Senate in the same district. He has been co-chair of the Republican Conference, alongside Nancy Munoz, since January 14, 2020. He was elected Minority Leader of the General Assembly after Jon Bramnick was elected to the State Senate.

== Early life ==
DiMaio was born in Newton and raised in Hackettstown. He graduated from Hackettstown High School in 1974 and shortly thereafter was elected the president of the Hackettstown Democratic Club. While in high school, he was a charter member of the Hackettstown First Aid and Rescue Squad's Youth Squad, later joining the squad as a life member. He served as a member of the town council for 11 years as a Democrat starting in 1980 before resigning in late 1990 just after he was elected mayor. He began serving as mayor in 1991 and switched parties to join the Republicans in March 1995. DiMaio was a member of the Hackettstown Municipal Utilities Authority from 1991 until 1995 and rejoined it in 1999 where he continues to serve. In 1999, he was elected the president of the New Jersey Conference of Mayors. DiMaio was defeated by Democrat Roger Hines in his bid for re-election for mayor in 1999.

== Warren County Commissioner ==
In December 2000, when incumbent Republican Warren County Commissioner Susan Dickey was elected County Surrogate, DiMaio was chosen by the Warren County Republican Committee to fill the remainder of her term. Almost immediately, he was chosen as Board Director for the year of 2001. He was chosen as Freeholder Director again in 2008. While serving as Freeholder, he was a member of the North Jersey Transportation Planning Authority (2001 through 2009) serving as vice-chair in 2008. He is also the owner of A. DiMaio and Son, Inc., a general contracting business in Hackettstown. DiMaio lives in Hackettstown with his wife Gina and two daughters.

== New Jersey Assembly ==
On February 21, 2009, a special election was held by a convention of Republican committee members from Hunterdon and Warren counties to fill the vacant Assembly seat of Marcia A. Karrow. Karrow had earlier won a special election convention for the right to succeed Congressman Leonard Lance, who resigned from the Senate after his election to the U.S. House of Representatives. At the special election convention, DiMaio defeated Erik Peterson and Matt Holt, both members of the Hunterdon County Board of Chosen Freeholders. On the first ballot, the totals were: DiMaio 129, Peterson 104, and Holt 56. On the second runoff ballot, the totals were: DiMaio 153 and Peterson 141. DiMaio was sworn into office on March 16, 2009. He was assigned to serve as a member of the Agriculture and Natural Resources Committee and the Telecommunications and Utilities Committee. In the June 2009 Republican primary, DiMaio successfully defended his Assembly seat. He and his running mate, Hunterdon County Freeholder Erik Peterson, narrowly edged out Ed Smith for the two spots on the November general election ballot. DiMaio and Peterson defeated Democratic candidates William Courtney and Tammeisha Smith in the general election.

=== Committees ===
Committee assignments for the 2024—2025 Legislative Session are:

- NA

=== District 23 ===
Each of the 40 districts in the New Jersey Legislature has one representative in the New Jersey Senate and two members in the New Jersey General Assembly. The representatives from the 23rd District for the 2024—2025 Legislative Session are:

- Senator Doug Steinhardt (R)
- Assemblyman John DiMaio (R)
- Assemblyman Erik Peterson (R)

== Electoral history ==
=== New Jersey Assembly ===
23rd Legislative District General Election, 2023
Party	Candidate	Votes	%
Republican	John DiMaio (incumbent)	31,122	29.5
Republican	Erik Peterson (incumbent)	30,366	28.8
Democratic	Tyler Powell	22,118	21.0
Democratic	Guy Citron	21,981	20.8
Total votes		105,587	100.0
Republican hold			
Republican hold			

23rd Legislative District General Election, 2021
Party	Candidate	Votes	%
Republican	John DiMaio (incumbent)	46,020	30.71%
Republican	Erik Peterson (incumbent)	44,801	29.90%
Democratic	Hope Kaufman	29,894	19.95%
Democratic	Nicholas F. LaBelle	29,146	19.45%
Total votes		149,861	100.0
Republican hold			

23rd Legislative District General Election, 2019
Party	Candidate	Votes	%
Republican	John DiMaio (incumbent)	27,887	30.41%
Republican	Erik Peterson (incumbent)	27,758	30.27%
Democratic	Denise King	18,093	19.73%
Democratic	Marisa Trofimov	17,969	19.59%
Total votes		91,707	100%
Republican hold			

New Jersey general election, 2017
Party	Candidate	Votes	%	±%
Republican	John DiMaio (Incumbent)	33,880	29.4	▼3.0
Republican	Erik Peterson (Incumbent)	32,233	27.9	▼3.4
Democratic	Laura Shaw	24,386	21.1	▲2.7
Democratic	Charles Boddy	21,690	18.8	▲0.9
End the Corruption	Tyler J. Gran	1,921	1.7	N/A
We Define Tomorrow	Michael Estrada	1,256	1.1	N/A
Total votes		'115,366'	'100.0'	

New Jersey general election, 2015
Party	Candidate	Votes	%	±%
Republican	John DiMaio (Incumbent)	17,654	32.4	▼1.2
Republican	Erik Peterson (Incumbent)	17,071	31.3	▼2.5
Democratic	Maria Rodriguez	10,056	18.4	▲1.5
Democratic	Marybeth Maciag	9,759	17.9	▲2.2
Total votes		'54,540'	'100.0'	

New Jersey general election, 2013
Party	Candidate	Votes	%	±%
Republican	Erik Peterson (Incumbent)	35,604	33.8	▲2.9
Republican	John DiMaio (Incumbent)	35,458	33.6	▲2.4
Democratic	John Valentine	17,828	16.9	▼2.7
Democratic	Ralph Drake	16,548	15.7	▼2.5
Total votes		'105,438'	'100.0'	

New Jersey general election, 2011
Party	Candidate	Votes	%
Republican	John DiMaio (Incumbent)	21,289	31.2
Republican	Erik Peterson (Incumbent)	21,074	30.9
Democratic	Karen Carroll	13,369	19.6
Democratic	Scott McDonald	12,420	18.2
Total votes		68,152	100.0

New Jersey general election, 2009
Party	Candidate	Votes	%	±%
Republican	John DiMaio (Incumbent)	49,137	35.3	▲4.3
Republican	Erik Peterson	48,067	34.5	▲3.5
Democratic	William J. Courtney	21,997	15.8	▼3.9
Democratic	Tammeisha Smith	19,939	14.3	▼4.1
Total votes		'139,140'	'100.0'	

New Jersey General Assembly
Preceded by Marcia A. Karrow	Member of the New Jersey General Assembly from the 23rd district 2009–present Served alongside: Michael J. Doherty, Erik Peterson	Incumbent
Preceded by Jon Bramnick	Minority Leader of the New Jersey General Assembly; 2022–present	Incumbent
