= Palmer v. Kleargear.com =

Law case decided in the United States

John Palmer and Jennifer Kulas v. Kleargear.com and Fidelity Information Corp.
- Court: United States District Court for the District of Utah
- Full case name: John Palmer and Jennifer Kulas v. Kleargear.com and Fidelity Information Corp.
- Decided: June 25, 2014
- Citations: no. 13-cv-00175 (D. Utah, filed Dec. 18, 2013)

Holding
- Default judgment; $306,750 in compensatory and punitive damages; reporting customer to debt collection for publishing a negative review violates the Fair Credit Reporting Act

Court membership
- Judge sitting: Dee Benson

Keywords
- Fair Credit Reporting Act

Palmer v. Kleargear.com, no. 13-cv-00175 (D. Utah, filed December 18, 2013), is a 2013 US federal lawsuit in which an internet retailer was sued by two of its customers after it billed the customers for $3,500 following a negative review. The retailer, Kleargear.com, specializes in nerd apparel, geek toys, gadgets and office toys; it is owned by Paris-based Descoteaux Boutiques. The plaintiffs charged the company with violating the Fair Credit Reporting Act, defamation and intentional infliction of emotional distress. In March 2014, the district court entered a default judgment for the plaintiffs, and in June 2014 awarded damages of $306,750. As of 2015, the Palmers continue to attempt to collect the judgment.

The internet retailer's charge to the consumer was based on an anti-disparagement clause of their site's terms and conditions.

The case led to a California statute prohibiting the enforcement of such clauses, and the introduction of the Consumer Review Freedom Act of 2015, a proposed bill that, since passed, has enacted similar prohibitions at the federal level.

== History ==
The plaintiffs, John and Jen Palmer, attempted to purchase a desk ornament and keychain from the company at a price under $20. Kleargear.com never delivered. PayPal automatically canceled the order in December 2008. Soon after, Jen left a negative review at Ripoff Report. In May 2012, the company sent a bill to Jen Palmer of Layton, Utah for $3,500 based on an anti-disparagement clause of their site's terms and conditions unless they agreed to take down the review. Ripoff Report has a policy of not removing reviews; statements of fact could only be removed if a $2,000 arbitration fee was paid and the arbitrator determined that those statements were false. When Palmer and her husband John refused to pay, Kleargear reported the fine for collection, which dragged down their credit rating.

One issue in the dispute was whether the disparagement clause had been present when the plaintiffs had made their order in 2008. In 2013, after examining archives of Kleargear's Terms of Service at the Internet Archive, KUTV and Techdirt stated that the clause had not been present and had been added to the site in June 2012. In 2014, Kleargear stated that the clause had been present in 2008.

Following an internet backlash, Kleargear closed its Facebook page and protected its Twitter account. Businessweek called the public backlash an example of the Streisand effect. Both the Better Business Bureau and TRUSTe have issued statements that Kleargear used their logos without permission and have begun investigations. Experian also began an investigation on the credit report.

On November 25, 2013, Public Citizen, representing the Palmers, sent an open letter demanding that Kleargear pay the Palmers $75,000, remove the taint on their credit rating, and cease and desist from using the non-disparagement clause in the future. Kleargear ignored a December 16, 2013, deadline to respond to the offer, and Public Citizen sued the company in federal court for Fair Credit Reporting Act violations, defamation, and other torts. According to attorney Scott Michelman, numerous attempts to get in touch with Kleargear before the suit were unsuccessful. In March 2014, United States District Court judge Dee Benson entered a default judgment in favor of the Palmers. Kleargear stated to the press that the default judgment was not valid because notice should have been served to its parent company in France. Judge Benson awarded the Palmers $306,750 in compensatory and punitive damages on June 25, 2014. On July 24, the Palmers filed a motion for $47,596.86 in attorneys' fees and expenses. On August 28, the court awarded fees and expenses in the amount requested.

On February 15, 2015, Judge Benson approved assignment of the judgment to the Law Offices of Ronald P. Slates, a Los Angeles law firm specializing in judgment collection, and closed the Utah case.

Responding to the Palmers' experience with KlearGear, California enacted a law in 2014 banning the use of non-disparagement clauses in consumer contracts. Similar bans were introduced in both houses of Congress in 2015, and Jen Palmer testified live before the U.S. Senate Committee on Commerce, Science, and Transportation in November 2015. Public Citizen submitted written testimony to the committee as well. With Public Citizen's support, the Consumer Review Freedom Act passed the Senate in December 2015.

In April 2015, the Palmers and the Slates firm filed suit in the U.S. District Court for the Central District of California to enforce the judgment by garnishment of Kleargear assets, including levies with credit card companies Discover Bank, American Express Centurion Bank, MasterCard International, and Visa Inc., as well as PayPal, Inc. against accounts held by Kleargear with those companies. As of October 2015, the case is assigned to U.S. District Court Judge George H. King.

== Further implications ==
Inspired by the Palmers' experience with KlearGear, the California legislature passed a bill in 2014 to ban the use of non-disparagement clauses in consumer contracts, and Governor Jerry Brown signed it into law on September 9, 2014.

In September 2015, the Consumer Review Freedom Act of 2015 (S. 2044) was introduced in the U.S. Congress, to make such clauses void and unenforceable at the federal level. U.S. Senator Jerry Moran cited the Kleargear case as one basis for the bill.

The U.S. Senate Committee on Commerce, Science, and Transportation scheduled hearings on the bill for November 4, 2015. Among those scheduled to testify were Jen Palmer, a plaintiff in Palmer v. KlearGear; Adam Medros, vice-president of TripAdvisor; Daniel Castro, vice-president of the Information Technology and Innovation Foundation; Eric Goldman, a law professor at the Santa Clara University School of Law; and Ira Rheingold, executive director of the National Association of Consumer Advocates.

In November 2016, the amended Consumer Review Freedom Act of 2015, titled the Consumer Review Fairness Act of 2016 (H.R. 5111), unanimously passed in the Senate. On December 15, 2016, it was signed into law by Barack Obama.
