= Warren County Board of County Commissioners =

Leadership
- Director: Lori Ciesla (R) since January 1, 2023
- Deputy Director: James R. Kern III (R) since January 1, 2018

Structure
- Seats: 3
- Political groups: Republican Party (3)
- Length of term: 3 years

Website
- Warren County Freeholders

The Warren County Board of County Commissioners is a body of three people, called commissioners, that govern Warren County, New Jersey.

The board is responsible for the governance of Warren County, New Jersey. They set out the budget for the county as well as the laws in the county. Each year the members choose two people on the board to serve as director and deputy director. The current director is Commissioner Jason Sarnoski, and Commissioner Richard Gardner is serving as deputy director.

== Sessions ==
In 2018, Commissioner Edward Smith announced his retirement and James Kern was nominated to his seat. Kern won the election and was sworn in on January 1.

=== Previous Sessions ===
Year	Seat 1	Seat 2	Seat 3
2002	Michael J. Doherty (R)	John DiMaio (R)	James DeBosh
2003	Michael J. Doherty (R)	John DiMaio (R)	Richard Gardner (R)
2004	Everett Chamberlain (R)	John DiMaio (R)	Richard Gardner (R)
2005	Everett Chamberlain (R)	John DiMaio (R)	Richard Gardner (R)
2006	Everett Chamberlain (R)	John DiMaio (R)	Richard Gardner (R)
2007	Everett Chamberlain (R)	John DiMaio (R)	Richard Gardner (R)
2008	Everett Chamberlain (R)	John DiMaio (R)	Richard Gardner (R)
2009	Everett Chamberlain (R)	John DiMaio (R)	Richard Gardner (R)
2009	Everett Chamberlain (R)	Angelo Accetturo (R)	Richard Gardner (R)
2010	Everett Chamberlain (R)	Angelo Accetturo (R)	Richard Gardner (R)
2011	Everett Chamberlain (R)	Jason Sarnoski (R)	Richard Gardner (R)
2012	Everett Chamberlain (R)	Jason Sarnoski (R)	Richard Gardner (R)
2013	Edward Smith (R)	Jason Sarnoski (R)	Richard Gardner (R)
2014	Edward Smith (R)	Jason Sarnoski (R)	Richard Gardner (R)
2015	Edward Smith (R)	Jason Sarnoski (R)	Richard Gardner (R)
2016	Edward Smith (R)	Jason Sarnoski (R)	Richard Gardner (R)
2017	Edward Smith (R)	Jason Sarnoski (R)	Richard Gardner (R)
2018	Edward Smith (R)	Jason Sarnoski (R)	Richard Gardner (R)
2019	James R. Kern III (R)	Jason Sarnoski (R)	Richard Gardner (R)
2020	James R. Kern III (R)	Jason Sarnoski (R)	Richard Gardner (R)
2021	James R. Kern III (R)	Jason Sarnoski (R)	Richard Gardner (R)
2022	James R. Kern III (R)	Jason Sarnoski (R)	Lori Ciesla (R)
2023	James R. Kern III (R)	Jason Sarnoski (R)	Lori Ciesla (R)
2024	James R. Kern III (R)	Jason Sarnoski (R)	Lori Ciesla (R)
2025	James R. Kern III (R)	Jason Sarnoski (R)	Lori Ciesla (R)
