= David Segal (journalist) =

Newspaper columnist

- Occupations: newspaper columnist and reporter
- Employer: The New York Times
- Known for: "The Haggler" customer service column

David Segal is a newspaper columnist and reporter. He was the author of "The Haggler", a bi-weekly column in the Sunday edition of The New York Times. Segal has received praise for his writing and reporting skills.

== The Haggler ==
Until June 11, 2017 Segal authored the bi-weekly "The Haggler" column in the Sunday edition of The New York Times, in which he printed and attempted to resolve reader-submitted letters about plights in customer service. His column covered companies such as Sears, Apple, Samsung, and many others. It was generally written in a semi-third person style, in which he referred to himself as "The Haggler" rather than "I". His interventions were generally successful.

== Writing ==
David Segal has written pieces for The New York Times about technology and business topics including search-engine optimization and SEC-related fraud. He was one of a team of New York Times reporters who won the 2013 Pulitzer Prize for Explanatory Reporting for a series of 10 articles about the business practices of Apple and other technology companies.

Segal's December 2010 story about a Brooklyn-based online eyeglass seller, Vitaly Borker, who manipulated his site's Google search ranking through negative publicity received attention from the media and prompted Google to alter its algorithms.

Before joining the New York Times in 2008, Segal worked for 14 years at The Washington Post, four of them spent as the paper's pop music critic and four others as the paper's Style section correspondent in New York City. At The Post, Segal wrote a profile about a British man who sued Wilco for using sounds he'd recorded in the band's album Yankee Hotel Foxtrot. This profile was later published in Da Capo Best Music Writing 2005.

Segal was an editor at The Washington Monthly in 1993 and 1994 and as of 2024 remains a contributing editor for the magazine. Since 2004, he has also contributed stories to the radio show This American Life.
