= Consumer Review Fairness Act =

Consumer Review Fairness Act of 2016
- Long title: To prohibit the use of certain clauses in form contracts that restrict the ability of a consumer to communicate regarding the goods or services offered in interstate commerce that were the subject of the contract, and for other purposes.
- Enacted by: the 114th United States Congress

Citations
- Public law: Pub. L. 114–258 (text) (PDF)
- Statutes at Large: 130 Stat. 1355

Codification
- Titles amended: 15 U.S.C.: Commerce and Trade
- U.S.C. sections created: 15 U.S.C. § 45b

Legislative history
- Introduced in the House of Representatives as H.R. 5111 by Leonard Lance (R-NJ-7) on April 28, 2016; Committee consideration by House Energy and Commerce Committee; Passed the House of Representatives on September 12, 2016 (voice vote); Passed the Senate on November 28, 2016 (unanimous consent); Signed into law by President Barack Obama on December 14, 2016

The Consumer Review Fairness Act of 2016, signed into law by President Barack Obama on December 14, 2016, is a federal consumer protection statute banning the use of gag clauses in non-negotiable consumer form contracts.

== History ==
On September 16, 2015, Sen. John Thune (R-S.D.), chairman of the Senate Commerce Committee, along with Senators Schatz and Jerry Moran, introduced the Consumer Review Freedom Act of 2015 (S. 2044). The legislation was co-sponsored by Senator Bill Nelson and Senators Richard Blumenthal, Claire McCaskill, Steve Daines, and Cory Booker. Similar legislation was introduced in the House of Representatives by Congressman Darrell Issa on April 29, 2015 (H.R. 2110).

On November 4, 2015, the Senate Commerce Committee held a hearing exploring the impact of non-disparagement clauses in form contracts. Witnesses testified that non-disparagement clauses have been used in many industries, including health care, retail, and hospitality. The Committee also heard testimony from Jen Palmer, a consumer and plaintiff in the lawsuit Palmer v. Kleargear.com. In that case, an online retailer demanded that Ms. Palmer remove a negative online review or pay $3,500 in damages because the website's terms of service included a non-disparagement clause. The Senate Commerce Committee received testimony that California has enacted a law to bar such clauses in non-negotiable form contracts. The Committee also learned that the FTC has brought an enforcement action against one company, alleging, inter alia, that the firm's threats to enforce a gag provision against consumers to stop them from posting negative reviews and testimonials online constitute an unfair trade practice in violation of section 5 of the FTC Act. In some cases, judges have refused to enforce non-disparagement clauses in form contracts usually on the grounds of unconscionability. Despite the persuasive rationale of these judicial opinions, the Commerce Committee nevertheless felt that federal legislation was necessary to eliminate any ambiguity over the enforceability of non-disparagement clauses.

== Summary of Provisions ==
The Consumer Review Fairness Act of 2016 invalidates non-disparagement clauses in certain "form contracts" (as defined in the statute) and makes it unlawful for a person to offer or enter into a form contract containing a non-negotiable non-disparagement clause. Violations of this prohibition are enforced by the Federal Trade Commission and state attorneys general. The law does not limit the ability of a person or business to file a civil cause of action for defamation, libel, slander, or any similar cause of action under State law.

Clause 2(f) required the Federal Trade Commission to publish illustrations of best practice compliance with the Act. Guidance was published by the commission in February 2017.

== Enforcement History ==
In August 2018, the FTC brought its first case charging violations of the Consumer Review Fairness Act against the marketers behind a purported money-making promotion called Sellers Playbook. In that case, the FTC alleged that, in addition to misrepresenting earnings claims, the defendants offered form contracts to their customers that contained provisions that bar or restrict their customers' ability to engage in reviews and performance assessments, among other things.
