= Eric Goldman =

American law professor

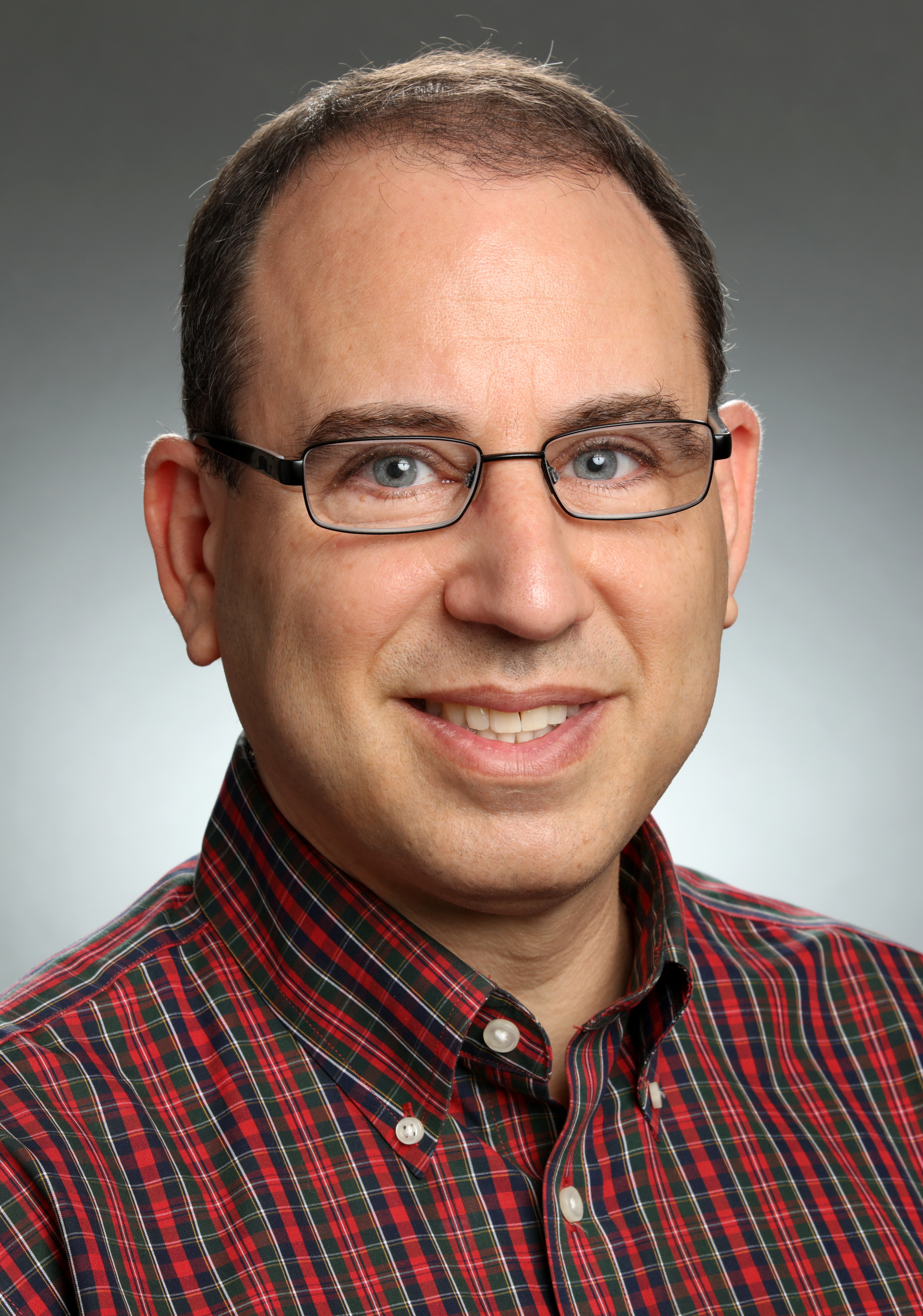
- Goldman in 2017
- Born: Eric Schlachter; April 15, 1968 (age 58); Madison, Wisconsin, U.S.
- Education: UCLA, 1988; UCLA School of Law, 1994; UCLA Anderson School of Management, 1994
- Occupation: Law professor
- Employer: Santa Clara University School of Law
- Website: Eric Goldman.org; Technology & Marketing Law Blog

Eric Goldman (born April 15, 1968) is a law professor at Santa Clara University School of Law. He also co-directs the law school's High Tech Law Institute and co-supervises the law school's Privacy Law Certificate.

== Career ==
Goldman was an assistant professor at Marquette University Law School, General Counsel of Epinions.com, and a technology transactions attorney at Cooley Godward. He then joined the faculty at Santa Clara University.

Goldman was part of the first wave of teaching Internet Law courses in law schools, having taught his first course in 1995–96. He has testified before Congress on the Consumer Review Fairness Act, Stop Enabling Sex Traffickers Act (SESTA), and Allow States and Victims to Fight Online Sex Trafficking Act (FOSTA). In a well-publicized December 2005 post to his Technology & Marketing Law Blog, Goldman incorrectly predicted Wikipedia's demise in five years. Goldman has co-authored (with Rebecca Tushnet of Harvard Law) the first Advertising & Marketing Law casebook for the law school community.

He has been shortlisted as an "IP Thought Leader" by Managing IP magazine and named an "IP Vanguard" by the California State Bar's Intellectual Property section.

Goldman publishes the Technology & Marketing Law Blog, which covers Internet Law, Intellectual Property, and Advertising Law. The blog was named to the ABA Journal's Blawg 100 Hall of Fame.

Goldman oversees DoctoredReviews.com, a website designed to combat doctors' efforts to suppress patients' reviews, serves on the board of directors of the Public Participation Project, a group lobbying for federal anti-SLAPP legislation and coauthored an amicus brief in the 1-800 Contacts, Inc. v. WhenU.com, Inc. case with the Electronic Frontier Foundation.

== Scholarship ==
=== Select publications ===
- Goldman, E. (Spring 2006), "Search Engine Bias and the Demise of Search Engine Utopianism", Yale Journal of Law & Technology, 8: 188, Bibcode:2008wsis.book..121G, SSRN 893892.
- "Deregulating Relevancy in Internet Trademark Law", Emory Law Journal, 54: 507, 2005, SSRN 635803.
- "Warez Trading and Criminal Copyright Infringement", Journal of Copyright Society, 51, USA: 395, 2004, SSRN 487163.
- "Wikipedia's Labor Squeeze and its Consequences", Journal of Telecommunications and High Technology Law, 8, USA: 157, 2010, SSRN 487163.
- "Emojis and the Law", Washington Law Review, 93, USA: 1227, 2018, SSRN 3133412.

=== Books ===
- Advertising & Marketing Law: Cases and Materials (2nd Edition, 2014; 3rd Edition, 2016; 4th Edition, 2018) co-authored with Rebecca Tushnet (the first casebook on this topic)
- INTERNET LAW: CASES & MATERIALS (2014; 2015; 2016; 2017; 2018; 2019 editions)
- Find Kitty Nala (co-authored with Lisa Goldman) (2016)
