= Emi Koyama =

Japanese-American activist (1975–2026)

Emi Koyama 小山 エミ
- Born: 1975; Japan
- Died: June 2026 (aged 50–51)
- Occupations: Activist, artist, scholar
- Writing career
- Notable work: The Transfeminist Manifesto
- Website: eminism.org

Emi Koyama (Japanese: 小山 エミ; 1975 – June 2026) was a Japanese-born American activist, artist and scholar. Her work discusses issues of feminism, intersex human rights, domestic violence and prostitution, among others. Koyama was best known for her 2000 essay "The Transfeminist Manifesto", which has been republished in several transgender studies anthologies and journals. She was a founder of the advocacy group Intersex Initiative.

== Background ==
Koyama was born in Japan in 1975, to parents who were members of the Japanese Communist Party. She moved to the East Bay of California with her parents, then was taken in by Southern Baptists in Missouri when her parents left the country. After attending college in Springfield, Missouri, Koyama continued her studies in Maine. She moved to rural Oregon, then Portland, where she did paid sex work in order to continue her studies.

== Activism ==
In 2001, Koyama served as a student intern, staff activist, and program assistant for the Intersex Society of North America, before leaving to found and direct her own advocacy group, Intersex Initiative (IPDX). The organization runs classes, workshops, and lectures focused on discussing social, cultural, and medical issues faced by intersex people. Koyama and fellow intersex activist Betsy Driver founded Intersex Awareness Day in 2003, commemorating the first official demonstration by intersex activists in North America.

Koyama was an advocate for the decriminalization of sex work and a member of the Coalition for Rights and Safety for People in the Sex Trade, located in Seattle. Koyama was previously also a board member of the Survival Project, a now-defunct organization serving intersex and transgender survivors of sexual abuse and domestic violence. She also co-founded Aileen's, a Washington state mutual aid organization for sex workers.

Koyama wrote about social justice issues on her blog, Eminism, and sold buttons, zines, and apparel designed by herself and other activists. Julia Serano credited Koyama's blog for her decision to use the then-obscure 'Cisgender' terminology in Whipping Girl.

Her writing developed theories of third-wave feminism and transfeminism, with her 2000 publication "The Transfeminist Manifesto" being one of the earliest usages of the term. As defined by her, transfeminism is "a movement by and for trans women who view their liberation to be intrinsically linked to the liberation of all women and beyond." Alongside fellow Survivor Project member Diana Courvant, Koyama founded the website Transfeminism.org. The now-defunct website was created originally to promote the Transfeminism Anthology Project, which aimed to create the first anthology centered around intersex and transfeminist perspectives; the website also served as a general resource surrounding discussion of transfeminism in academia and activism.

In 2001, Koyama helped form the Third Wave Feminisms Interest Group at the National Women’s Studies Association (NWSA); the group aimed to "push forward the discussion about third wave feminisms by moving the focus away from generational politics or identity group and onto epistemological and ontological shifts made possible through adopting the label, 'third wave.'" While Koyama has been a regular participant and speaker in NWSA conferences, she has also been critical of the organization. In 2008, she published a blog post titled "This is Not a Tribute to Audre Lorde", criticizing the conference's treatment of her and other women of color.

In 2013, Koyama also spoke out against the Forging Justice conference sponsored by the National Organization for Men against Sexism (NOMAS) and the Michigan domestic violence organization HAVEN. Conference presenters allegedly refused to live stream her panel on intersectional feminism, and had threatened to interrupt it entirely. Koyama's writings on sex trafficking were also reportedly criticized by NOMAS co-founder Robert Brannon; she described Brannon as having "violated [my and other women's] boundaries" during later interactions at the conference. Koyama, along with other female presenters at the conference, created a list of demands to NOMAS advocating for reform of the organization’s internal policies to prevent the silencing and mistreatment of female activists.

Beginning in 2000, Koyama was outspoken against the "womyn-born womyn" policy at the Michigan Womyn's Music Festival. Her article "Whose Feminism is It Anyways? The Unspoken Racism of the Trans Inclusion Debate" criticized the festival's organizers for a policy that "essentializes, polarizes, and dichotomizes genders." Koyama also participated in a 2002 round table published in Bitch magazine focused on the festival, writing that "women-only spaces are not as safe or free […] but are rife with the same old racism, classism, ableism, and even internalized sexism acted on by women against other women." Koyama advocated instead for an ambiguous "women-only" policy that does not institute or enforce a specific definition of women.

== Personal life and death ==
In a 2014 interview with The Source Weekly, Koyama described herself as being a "runaway teen" and having engaged in sex work as an adult.

Koyama used she/her pronouns, but did not identify with any particular gender, stating on her blog that "having an identity—especially gender identity—is kind of weird: how she views herself depends on the human relationships and interactions that surround her, rather than arising from some intrinsic core sense of self."

She published articles in both English and Japanese.

Koyama died from cancer in June 2026.

== Selected bibliography ==
- "Whose feminism is it anyway? The unspoken racism of the trans inclusion debate." In The Transgender Studies Reader, ed. Susan Stryker. New York: Routledge, 2006. ISBN 978-0-415-94709-1
- "Disloyal to feminism: Abuse of survivors within the domestic violence shelter system." In The Color of Violence: INCITE! Anthology, eds. Andrea Smith, Beth E. Richie, Julia Sudbury. Cambridge, Mass.: South End Press, 2006. ISBN 978-0-8223-6295-1.
- "A new fat-positive feminism: Why the old fat-positive feminism (often) sucks and how to re-invent it." In The Women's Movement Today: An Encyclopedia of Third-Wave Feminism, ed. Leslie Heywood. Westport, Conn.: Greenwood Press, 2005. ISBN 978-0-313-33133-6.
- "Douseikon wo meguru beikoku LGBT komyunitii no poritikusu" ("The politics over same-sex marriages within LGBT communities"). In Dousei paatonaa: Douseikon DP-hou wo shiru tameni (Same-sex partnerships: Understanding same-sex marriage and domestic partnership registry.), eds. Yasunobu Akasugi, Yuki Tsuchiya, Makiko Tsutsui. 2004 [in Japanese].
- "The transfeminist manifesto." In Catching a Wave: Reclaiming Feminism for the 21st Century, eds. Rory Dicker, Alison Piepmeier. Boston: Northeastern University Press, 2003. ISBN 978-1-55553-570-4.
- "From social construction to social justice: Transforming how we teach about intersexuality" (co-authored with Lisa Weasel). In Women's Studies Quarterly Vol. 30, No. 3/4, Fall/Winter 2002.
