= Erik Peterson (politician) =

American politician

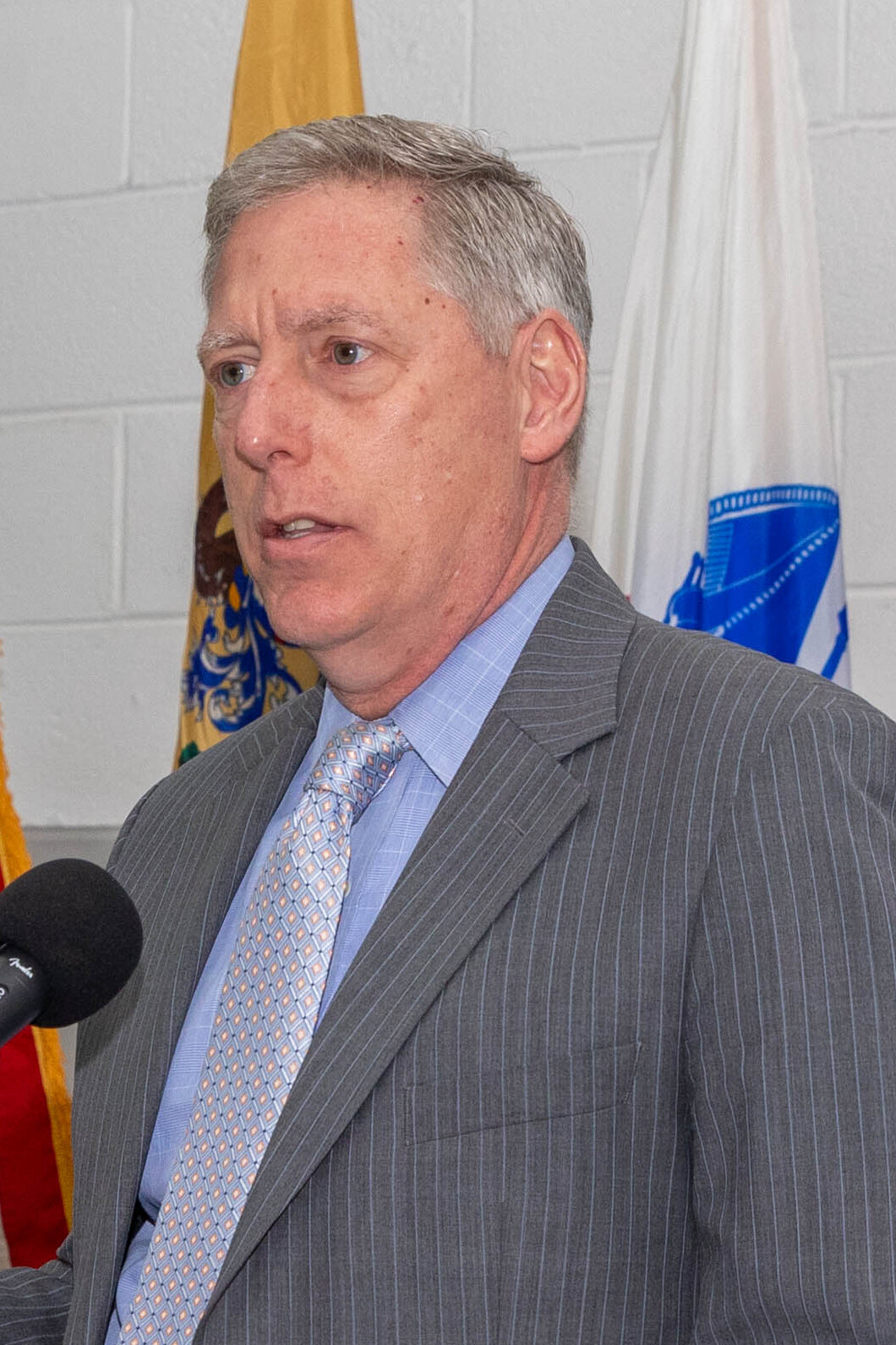

Member of the New Jersey General Assembly from the 23rd district
- Incumbent
- Assumed office December 7, 2009 Serving with John DiMaio
- Preceded by: Michael J. Doherty

Member of the Hunterdon County Board of Chosen Freeholders
- In office January 1, 2006 – December 7, 2009
- Preceded by: Frank Fuzo
- Succeeded by: Robert Walton

Personal details
- Born: March 8, 1966 (age 60) Cherry Hill, New Jersey, U.S.
- Party: Republican
- Spouse: Jenni Peterson
- Children: 4
- Education: North Carolina State University (BS); Temple University (JD)
- Website: State Assembly website Party website

Erik C. Peterson (born March 8, 1966) is an American Republican Party politician who represents the 23rd Legislative District in the New Jersey General Assembly. Peterson, who previously served on the Hunterdon County Board of Chosen Freeholders, replaced Assemblyman Michael J. Doherty, who was elected to the New Jersey Senate. He was sworn in on December 7, 2009, to fill Doherty's vacant Assembly seat.

== Early life ==
Peterson was born and raised in Cherry Hill, New Jersey, where he graduated from Cherry Hill High School East. He attended North Carolina State University and earned a bachelor's degree in business management in 1988. In 1990, he moved in Hunterdon County to work for the Beneficial Management Corporation. Recruited for the Accelerated Management Program at that company, he eventually ran the New Jersey operations of Beneficial's mortgage banking subsidiary. He then attended Temple University School of Law, graduating in 1996. That same year he was admitted to the bar in both New Jersey and Pennsylvania. After practicing law at various firms from 1998 until 2004, Peterson now has his own law office in Readington Township, specializing in real estate law, estate law, and business law. He currently resides in Franklin Township with his wife Jenni and their four children. He is a member of the Hunterdon County Chamber of Commerce and the local Lions Club. He is on the board of the local United Way.

== Political career ==
=== Hunterdon County Freeholder ===
Peterson's career in politics began with his appointment as a Republican County Committeeman for Lambertville, where he then resided. Peterson spent several years on the County Committee, only recently leaving that position. Peterson is also a former president of the Hunterdon County Young Republicans. Peterson was elected a Hunterdon County freeholder in 2005, running on a platform of fiscal conservatism, farmland preservation, and open government. He served as a freeholder from 2006 to 2009, and while on the board served as deputy director in 2007 and Director in 2008.

=== New Jersey Assemblyman ===
Before being selected as Assemblyman in December 2009, Peterson ran in a special convention to replace Assemblywoman Marcia A. Karrow who had been appointed to the State Senate. In the first ballot taken of Republican committee persons of the 23rd district, Warren County Freeholder John DiMaio received 129 votes (short of a majority), Peterson 104, and fellow Hunterdon County Freeholder Matt Holt 56. In the second ballot, DiMaio defeated Peterson 153–141. In 2009, Republican Assemblyman Michael J. Doherty declined to seek re-election to his Assembly seat and instead challenged State Senator Marcia A. Karrow in the Republican primary for the special election in the 23rd district. Incumbent DiMaio, Peterson, and Doherty's chief of staff, Edward Smith, ran for the Republican nomination to the Assembly seats. DiMaio received the most votes in the June 2009 Republican primary election, 11,888 votes (34.2% of the total vote) while Peterson narrowly defeated Smith by 52 votes: 11,439–11,387 (33.0% to 32.8%). DiMaio and Peterson won easily in the heavily Republican 23rd district in November's general election. As Doherty was sworn in as State Senator on November 23, 2009, a convention of Republican county committee members gathered to name a successor for the vacancy. Peterson was selected by the county committee members on December 6, 2009, and sworn into office the following day.

==== Committees ====
Committee assignments for the 2024—2025 Legislative Session are:

- Health
- Public Safety and Preparedness

In addition to his committee assignments, Peterson also serves as the Deputy Minority Whip in the General Assembly.

==== District 23 ====
Each of the 40 districts in the New Jersey Legislature has one representative in the New Jersey Senate and two members in the New Jersey General Assembly. The representatives from the 23rd District for the 2024—2025 Legislative Session are:

- Senator Doug Steinhardt (R)
- Assemblyman John DiMaio (R)
- Assemblyman Erik Peterson (R)

=== 2022 U.S. House election ===
In January 2022, Peterson announced he would seek the Republican nomination for the 7th congressional district in the 2022 election, seeking to challenge incumbent Democrat Tom Malinowski. Peterson received the endorsement of New Jersey Second Amendment Society, but was unable to win the party line in any county within the district. He lost the primary election coming in third place with 8,493 votes or 15.4%, with the winner, Tom Kean Jr. going on the defeat Malinowski in the general election.

== Electoral history ==
=== New Jersey Assembly ===
23rd Legislative District General Election, 2023
Party	Candidate	Votes	%
Republican	John DiMaio (incumbent)	31,122	29.5
Republican	Erik Peterson (incumbent)	30,366	28.8
Democratic	Tyler Powell	22,118	21.0
Democratic	Guy Citron	21,981	20.8
Total votes		105,587	100.0
Republican hold			
Republican hold			

23rd Legislative District General Election, 2021
Party	Candidate	Votes	%
Republican	John DiMaio (incumbent)	46,020	30.71%
Republican	Erik Peterson (incumbent)	44,801	29.90%
Democratic	Hope Kaufman	29,894	19.95%
Democratic	Nicholas F. LaBelle	29,146	19.45%
Total votes		149,861	100.0
Republican hold			

23rd Legislative District General Election, 2019
Party	Candidate	Votes	%
Republican	John DiMaio (incumbent)	27,887	30.41%
Republican	Erik Peterson (incumbent)	27,758	30.27%
Democratic	Denise King	18,093	19.73%
Democratic	Marisa Trofimov	17,969	19.59%
Total votes		91,707	100%
Republican hold			

New Jersey general election, 2017
Party	Candidate	Votes	%	±%
Republican	John DiMaio (Incumbent)	33,880	29.4	▼3.0
Republican	Erik Peterson (Incumbent)	32,233	27.9	▼3.4
Democratic	Laura Shaw	24,386	21.1	▲2.7
Democratic	Charles Boddy	21,690	18.8	▲0.9
End the Corruption	Tyler J. Gran	1,921	1.7	N/A
We Define Tomorrow	Michael Estrada	1,256	1.1	N/A
Total votes		'115,366'	'100.0'	

New Jersey general election, 2015
Party	Candidate	Votes	%	±%
Republican	John DiMaio (Incumbent)	17,654	32.4	▼1.2
Republican	Erik Peterson (Incumbent)	17,071	31.3	▼2.5
Democratic	Maria Rodriguez	10,056	18.4	▲1.5
Democratic	Marybeth Maciag	9,759	17.9	▲2.2
Total votes		'54,540'	'100.0'	

New Jersey general election, 2013
Party	Candidate	Votes	%	±%
Republican	Erik Peterson (Incumbent)	35,604	33.8	▲2.9
Republican	John DiMaio (Incumbent)	35,458	33.6	▲2.4
Democratic	John Valentine	17,828	16.9	▼2.7
Democratic	Ralph Drake	16,548	15.7	▼2.5
Total votes		'105,438'	'100.0'	

New Jersey general election, 2011
Party	Candidate	Votes	%
Republican	John DiMaio (Incumbent)	21,289	31.2
Republican	Erik Peterson (Incumbent)	21,074	30.9
Democratic	Karen Carroll	13,369	19.6
Democratic	Scott McDonald	12,420	18.2
Total votes		68,152	100.0

New Jersey general election, 2009
Party	Candidate	Votes	%	±%
Republican	John DiMaio (Incumbent)	49,137	35.3	▲4.3
Republican	Erik Peterson	48,067	34.5	▲3.5
Democratic	William J. Courtney	21,997	15.8	▼3.9
Democratic	Tammeisha Smith	19,939	14.3	▼4.1
Total votes		'139,140'	'100.0'	

=== United States House of Representative ===
2022 Republican primary results
Party	Candidate	Votes	%
Republican	Thomas Kean Jr.	25,111	45.6
Republican	Phil Rizzo	12,988	23.6
Republican	Erik Peterson	8,493	15.4
Republican	John Flora	3,051	5.5
Republican	John Henry Isemann	2,732	5.0
Republican	Kevin Dorlon	2,237	4.1
Republican	Sterling Schwab	429	0.8
Total votes		55,041	100.0
