= Scott Wainner =

American businessman (born 1978)

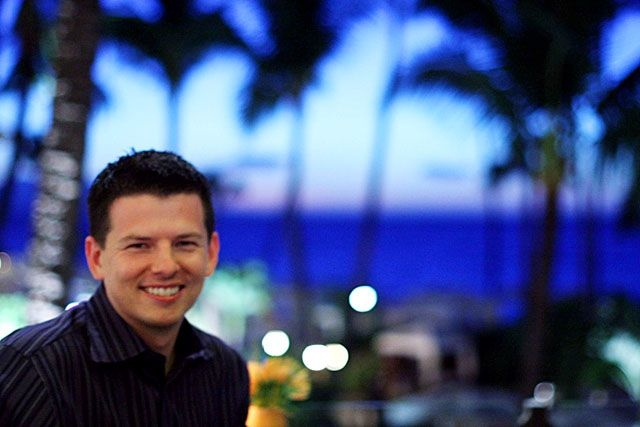
- Born: 1978 (age 47–48); United States
- Website: scottwainner.com

Scott Wainner (born 1978) is an American Internet entrepreneur and angel investor who founded Fareness and ResellerRatings. He is an investor in HandUp, a direct giving platform based in San Francisco.

== Personal life ==
Wainner grew up in Dallas, Texas, and attended Bishop Lynch High School. For college, he attended Texas A&M University in 1996, initially in the Aerospace Engineering program and then subsequently as a Computer Science major, but dropped out in 1998.

In addition to founding All Enthusiast, Inc. in 2001 and working as its CEO, he worked for EarthWeb in 1999-2000 as Editor-in-Chief, Internet.com in 2000-2001 as Editor-in-Chief, and Answers.com in 2012-2013 as GM of ResellerRatings.

== Career ==
=== Startups & exits ===
In 1994, while attending high school, Wainner launched System Optimization, later known as SysOpt.com, a computer hardware review site, ad supported with no funding. In 1998, he learned to code and launched ResellerRatings. Together, these websites generated $100,000 per year in profits by 1999.

In 1999, Wainner was approached by Andover.net, the company that acquired Slashdot.org and that was acquired by VA Linux, with an offer to buy the ResellerRatings and SysOpt.com businesses. Another company, EarthWeb, was also interested in acquiring the businesses, and made a higher bid. Wainner sold both the ResellerRatings and SysOpt.com businesses to EarthWeb in 1999 for $4 million, and went to work for EarthWeb as Editor-in-Chief. In 2001, EarthWeb decided to sell its network of sites, including SysOpt.com and ResellerRatings and other sites, except for Dice.com, to Internet.com, in a transaction valued at $500k, and Wainner transferred to work at Internet.com. Wainner left Internet.com in 2001.

In 2002, Internet.com discontinued the ResellerRatings website, and displayed a splash page indicating that the site was being discontinued. Wainner contacted Internet.com seeking to repurchase the site, and negotiated the re-acquisition of the site for $32,000.

Wainner took EarthWeb to arbitration to dispute the earn-out portion of the transaction. The arbitrator found that EarthWeb had violated its agreement by offloading the business to Internet.com, and had not properly supported the site. Wainner won the dispute, and received an award of $628,000. By 2008, Wainner's ResellerRatings business was earning $2 Million in revenues per year, with 5 employees.

From 2008 through 2012, Wainner hired a team of 12, and worked to grow the ResellerRatings business, reaching annual revenues of $6 Million in 2012 through its subscription platform. In 2012, Wainner sold the ResellerRatings business to Answers.com for $34M, and then worked for Answers.com for 18 months as GM of the ResellerRatings business, until January 2014. Notably, Wainner never took outside funding for the ResellerRatings business, instead bootstrapping the business, and at the time of both of its sale transactions, in 1999 and 2012, Wainner was the sole shareholder of the business with no outstanding debt.

In August 2015, Wainner founded Fareness, an airfare booking app that lets consumers see fares across multiple simultaneous dates and destinations.

=== Angel investments ===
Wainner's angel investments include HandUp, a San Francisco-based direct giving platform that allows donors to provide assistance to homeless on a community level, Compology, a smart waste management platform that uses sensor technology to help waste companies service only full dumpsters, and Framed Data, an analytics platform that works to predict and reduce SaaS user/customer churn.

=== Philanthropy ===
Wainner is a board member of The Pixie Project, a Portland, Oregon-based non-profit animal shelter and rescue. Wainner is also a financial contributor to the Pixie Project.

In February 2015, Wainner donated $175,000 to the Pixie Project to help it expand its services, increase spay and neuter surgeries, and increase adoptions.

=== Television appearances ===
Wainner was interviewed about online shopping by TechTV's Leo Laporte in the live ScreenSavers show in 2002. He was also featured in a live interview on the G4TV show with Chris Pirillo to discuss the ResellerRatings business.
