= Betsy Driver =

American politician and intersex activist (born 1964)

Mayor of Flemington, New Jersey
- In office January 2, 2019 – January 3, 2023
- Preceded by: Phil Greiner
- Succeeded by: Marcia A. Karrow

Town Councilor in Flemington, New Jersey
- In office 2017–2019

Personal details
- Born: 1964 (age 61–62) Buffalo, New York, U.S.
- Party: Democratic

Betsy Driver (born 1964) is a former mayor of Flemington, New Jersey, and an advocate for intersex human rights and awareness. She is the first openly intersex person to be elected as a political officeholder in the United States.

== Early life ==
Driver was born in Buffalo, New York in 1964. She was born with congenital adrenal hyperplasia (CAH).

In her mid-30s, she began learning about intersex people and the surgeries she went through at eight months old. She has stated that she and her mother had been falsely told that she was the only one to have this condition.

== Career and advocacy ==
Driver was once a journalist and segment producer for CBS News. After joining groups for women with CAH, in 2001, she co-founded Bodies Like Ours, an online community forum for those with intersex variations. In 2003, Driver was appointed executive director of Bodies Like Ours. Driver and Emi Koyama started Intersex Awareness Day, which is observed on October 26 and is internationally recognized.

When Driver decided to run for a town council seat in Flemington in 2017, she learned that opponents planned to make an issue of her identity. She wrote an article about Intersex Awareness Day on her campaign Facebook page and the topic never became an issue during her campaign. In 2017, Driver was elected to Flemington town council, where she served for two years before being elected as mayor. She is the first openly intersex elected official in the United States, and the second worldwide after Australian Tony Briffa.

She was selected as a grand marshal for the 50th Pride Parade in Manhattan and recognized by Heritage of Pride as a community hero in 2019.

Driver became the mayor of Flemington, New Jersey, on January 2, 2019 after defeating incumbent mayor Phil Greiner by 26 votes in the November 2018 election. After 1 term, she lost re-election to former State Senator Marcia A. Karrow by 94 votes in 2022.

== Personal life ==
Driver has lived in Flemington since 2007 with her wife and their two sons.

== See also ==
- List of transgender public officeholders in the United States
