= ResellerRatings =

Online ratings site

- Website type: e-Commerce review site
- Website: www.resellerratings.com
- Commercial: Yes
- Launched: 2001; 25 years ago
- Current status: Active

ResellerRatings is an online ratings site where consumers submit ratings and reviews of online retailers, and online retailers participate to respond to reviewers and to gather reviews from their customers post-purchase. As of July 11, 2017, the site had over 6.2 million user-submitted reviews for 202,000 stores.

ResellerRatings operates a freemium business model. Merchants can participate to receive certain features for free, and can subscribe for additional features.

== History ==
ResellerRatings was launched in 1996 as a subsection of SysOpt.com (sysopt.com/resellerratings, at that time). Its founder, Scott Wainner, sold SysOpt.com and ResellerRatings.com to EarthWeb in 1999 for several million dollars. EarthWeb sold ResellerRatings to Internet.com in 2001. In 2002, Internet.com shut ResellerRatings.com down, and Wainner bought the site back for $32,000.

Initially, in 1996, ResellerRatings began as a hobby to help consumers, but over time it was developed into a SaaS platform with large retail customers including Zappos, HomeDepot, Newegg, and others.

In August 2012, ResellerRatings was acquired by Answers.

In January 2013, ResellerRatings changed its pricing structure for some merchants and some small merchants disagreed with these changes. Other merchants felt that the changes were justified, such as Jose Prendes of PureFormulas.com who said, "You have to put it in context," Prendes says. "If it's a really small operation, it would probably affect them more and they might feel they can't afford it. For us, it's a great way of staying in touch with customers."

== Consumer Protection ==
The NY BBB and the NY Office of the Attorney General partnered with ResellerRatings in 2009 to detect and investigate illegal practices by Internet-based companies. ResellerRatings provided alerts whenever it determined that fake customer reviews were being posted on behalf of a merchant.

In 2011, online retailer Full Home Appliances took issue with a customer over the contents of their review, citing the merchant's own terms of use stating that the customer essentially agreed not to post a negative review about the business, and claiming that the customer violated those terms by posting a review. At the time, the New York Times highlighted the merchant's aggressive terms. Later, merchant terms of use in regard to attempts to limit what a customer could or could not say online, became a central issue with merchant Kleargear.com in Palmer v. Kleargear.com, when Kleargear.com charged its customer, Palmer, $3,500 for writing a negative review that it claimed violated its terms of sale. ResellerRatings played a role in this when reviews began appearing on the site, illustrating KlearGear's history of customer issues. The Kleargear.com issue was an important catalyst for the Consumer Review Freedom act of 2015 (S. 2044), to negate any such unreasonable terms of sale which attempted to penalize customers for stating their opinions.

== Merchant Tools ==
ResellerRatings provides tools to merchants to interact with reviewers and gather reviews post-sale, and syndicates ratings and reviews to engines such as Google and Bing.

"Shopping Review" websites like ResellerRatings or Angie's List are insulated from what their reviewers write due to the Internet Communications Decency Act protections which shields websites from what their users do or say.
