= Marcia A. Karrow =

American politician

Mayor of Flemington, New Jersey
- Incumbent
- Assumed office January 3, 2023
- Preceded by: Betsy Driver

Executive Director - New Jersey Meadowlands Commission
- In office January 1, 2011 – October 2015

Chairperson, Subcommittee on Environmental Protection for Governor-Elect Chris Christie
- In office 2009–2010

Member of the New Jersey State Senate from the 23rd district
- In office February 8, 2009 – November 23, 2009
- Preceded by: Leonard Lance
- Succeeded by: Michael J. Doherty

Member of the New Jersey General Assembly from the 23rd District
- In office January 10, 2006 – February 9, 2009 Serving with Michael J. Doherty
- Preceded by: Connie Myers
- Succeeded by: John DiMaio

Member of the Hunterdon County Board of Chosen Freeholders
- In office 1994–2005

Member of the Raritan Township Committee
- In office 1999–2002

Personal details
- Born: March 10, 1959 (age 67)
- Party: Republican
- Education: Smith College (B.A.); University of Michigan (M.A.); Baruch College (M.B.A.)

Marcia A. Karrow (born March 10, 1959) is an American politician affiliated with the Republican Party. She is currently serving as the mayor of Flemington, New Jersey. She previously served in the New Jersey State Senate representing the 23rd Legislative District from February 9, 2009 to November 23, 2009. She previously served for three years in the General Assembly representing the same district she represented in the Senate.

In the assembly, Karrow was one of two assemblymembers representing the 23rd district, the other being Michael J. Doherty. When Leonard Lance resigned from the State Senate after his election to the U.S. House of Representatives, Karrow and Doherty ran against each other in a January 24, 2009 special election convention for the right to succeed him, with Karrow winning. However, Doherty decided to run against Karrow again in the June 2009 Republican primary election for the State Senate seat, and he defeated her. After going on to win the general election in November of that year against Democrat Harvey Baron, Doherty succeeded Karrow in the State Senate on November 23, 2009.

== Biography ==
A 1977 graduate of Hunterdon Central Regional High School, Karrow graduated with a B.A. from Smith College in History (1981), an M.A. from the University of Michigan in Classical Archaeology (1985) and was awarded a M.B.A. from Baruch College of the City University of New York in 1991 (Finance/Budget).

Karrow's father, Sol, served on the borough council in Flemington, New Jersey from 1963 to 1980 and owned a men's shop on Main Street in the town.

== Political career ==
=== Local politics ===
Karrow served on the Raritan Township Committee from 1994 to 2002, as Deputy Mayor in 1996, and as Mayor in 1998. She served on the Raritan Township Planning Board from 1992 to 1993 and in 1998. She served on the Raritan Township Environmental Commission from 1994, the Raritan Township Open Space Advisory Committee from 1997, the Raritan Township Agricultural Advisory Board from 1999, and on the Raritan Township Economic Development Committee from 1994 to 1996. She also served on the Flemington Partnership for Progress on its board of directors / chair, Economic Restructuring from 1994 to 1997 and on the Governor's Planning Council on Aging in 1994. Karrow was a member of the Raritan Valley Community College Search Committee from 1995 to 1998.

Karrow has also served on the Hunterdon County Health and Human Services Advisory Council from 1995 to 1998, and as its Vice Chair in 1997; Hunterdon County Mental Health Board from 1993 to 1998; Hunterdon County Work Force Investment Board from 1997; Hunterdon County Planning Board Growth Management Task Force on Industrial and Commercial Growth from 1996; Hunterdon Economic Partnership Board of Directors in 1998; Hunterdon County Municipal Officers Association as its President from 1997 to 1998; and the Hunterdon County Council on Aging from 1993 to 1996.

Karrow served on the Hunterdon County Board of Chosen Freeholders beginning in 1999, and served as the Freeholder Director from 1999 to 2000. As a Freeholder, Karrow served on the Hunterdon County Planning Board (Liaison), Health and Human Services (Liaison), Hunterdon County Economic Partnership (Liaison), Work Force Investment Board (Member), Polytech Special Sub-Committee (Member) and the Hunterdon County Agriculture Development Board (Liaison).

=== State legislature ===
Karrow was elected to the Assembly on November 8, 2005, filling the seat of fellow Republican Connie Myers, who did not run for reelection and had held the seat since 1996. In the Assembly she served on the Agriculture and Natural Resources Committee, the Budget Committee, and the State House Commission. She resigned from her Assembly seat on February 9, 2009 when she is sworn into the State Senate.

Karrow was appointed to seats on the Senate Budget and Appropriations Committee, the Senate Labor Committee, and the State's Capital Budget Commission by Senate Minority Leader Tom Kean, Jr. after her swearing into the Senate. Lance served as Ranking Minority Member of the Budget and Appropriations Committee during his last year in the Senate.

==== 2009 State Senate race ====
On November 20, 2008, Karrow announced her intention to run for the State Senate seat vacated by Leonard Lance, who was elected to represent the 7th congressional district in the United States House of Representatives. Karrow's opponent in the race was Assemblyman Michael J. Doherty. Hunterdon County Freeholder Matt Holt originally planned to run for the vacancy as well, but dropped out to run for one of the Assembly vacancies opened up by Karrow or Doherty.

On January 24, 2009, a special election was held by a convention of Republican committee members from Hunterdon and Warren counties. Karrow defeated Doherty in the special election by a margin of 195 votes to 143. Doherty announced he would run against Karrow a second time in the June 2009 primary, when she would be running as the incumbent.

The Hunterdon and Warren county Republican committee members held another special convention on February 21, 2009 to fill Karrow's vacant Assembly seat. In the contest, Warren County Freeholder John DiMaio defeated Hunterdon County Freeholders Matt Holt and Erik Peterson.

On June 2, 2009, Doherty defeated Karrow in the Republican Senate primary by a margin of 52%-48%. Doherty went on to win the November special election, defeating Democratic candidate Harvey Baron to fill the remaining two years of the term. Karrow's Senate term ended on November 23, 2009 when Doherty was sworn into office.

=== Post-state legislature ===
In November 2009, Karrow was named a member of the transition team of Governor-Elect Chris Christie, serving as chair of the subcommittee on environmental protection. She then was appointed Chair by Governor Christie under his Executive Order 12 to review issues with the Council on Affordable Housing.

Karrow was chosen in December 2010 to serve as Executive Director of the New Jersey Meadowlands Commission, succeeding Robert Ceberio, who had held the position for eight years. After the New Jersey Sports and Exposition Authority took over the responsibilities of the Meadowlands Commission, Karrow's role as director ended in October 2015.

Karrow later served as the administrator of Middlesex, New Jersey from 2019 until her retirement in 2022. She would then announce her run for Mayor of Flemington, New Jersey (she had moved back to Flemington from neighboring Raritan Township in 2005) against incumbent Democrat Betsy Driver. She defeated Driver in the November 2022 election by 94 votes.

New Jersey General Assembly
Preceded by Connie Myers	New Jersey State Assemblyman - District 23; January 2006 - February 2009	Succeeded by John DiMaio
New Jersey Senate
Preceded by Leonard Lance	New Jersey State Senator - District 23; February 2009 - November 23, 2009	Succeeded by Michael J. Doherty
