= Connie Myers =

American politician

Member of the New Jersey General Assembly from the 23rd Legislative District
- In office January 9, 1996 – January 10, 2006 Serving with Leonard Lance and Michael J. Doherty
- Preceded by: Chuck Haytaian
- Succeeded by: Marcia A. Karrow

Personal details
- Born: November 14, 1944 (age 81) Staten Island, New York, U.S.
- Party: Republican

Connie Myers (born November 14, 1944) is an American Republican Party politician, who served in the New Jersey General Assembly from 1996 to 2006, where she represented the 23rd Legislative District. Myers served in the Assembly on the Appropriations Committee and the Regulatory Oversight Committee.

A resident of Holland Township, Myers graduated in 1967 with a B.A. from the Montclair State University in English and was awarded an M.A. in 1990 from Rider University in Public Administration.

Myers served on the Hunterdon County Planning Board from 1992 to 1997 and on the Hunterdon County Board of Elections 1989–95. Myers was an Alternate Delegate to the 1988 Republican National Convention. She served in the Administration of Governor of New Jersey Thomas Kean as special assistant to director of Division on Women in the New Jersey Department of Consumer Affairs and as legislative analyst in the New Jersey Department of Transportation from 1986 to 1989.

Myers did not seek reelection in 2005, and was succeeded by fellow Republican Marcia A. Karrow who took office on January 10, 2006.

== District 23 ==
Each of the forty districts in the New Jersey Legislature has one representative in the New Jersey Senate and two members in the New Jersey General Assembly. The other representatives from the 23rd Legislative District for the 2004-2006 legislative session were:

- Assemblyman Michael J. Doherty, and
- Senator Leonard Lance

New Jersey General Assembly
Preceded by Chuck Haytaian	New Jersey State Assemblyman - District 23; January 1996 - January 2006	Succeeded by Marcia A. Karrow
