= Michael J. Doherty =

American politician (born 1963) from New Jersey

Michael Doherty
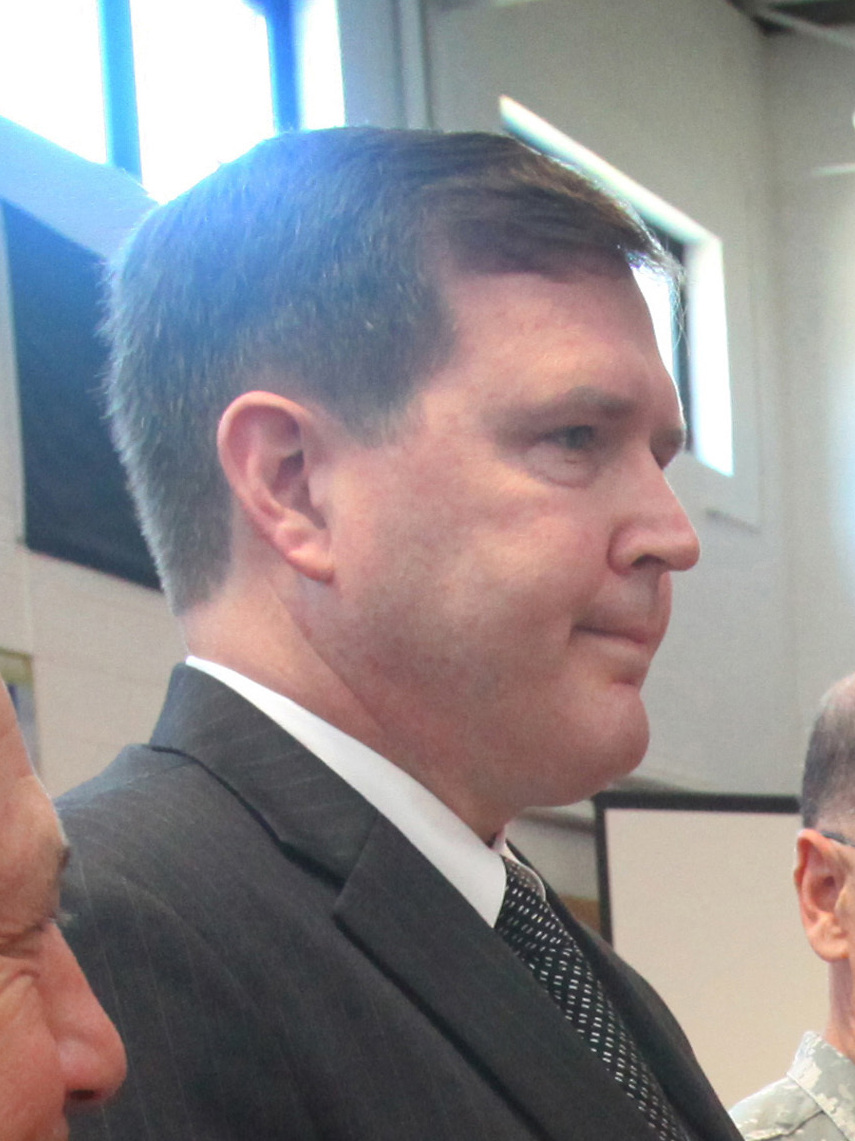

Member of the New Jersey Senate from the 23rd district
- In office November 23, 2009 – November 30, 2022
- Preceded by: Marcia A. Karrow
- Succeeded by: Doug Steinhardt

Member of the New Jersey General Assembly from the 23rd district
- In office January 8, 2002 – November 23, 2009
- Preceded by: Leonard Lance
- Succeeded by: Erik Peterson

Member of the Warren County Board of County Commissioners from the 1st district
- In office January 1, 2001 – January 1, 2004
- Preceded by: Ann M. Stone
- Succeeded by: Everett A. Chamberlain

Personal details
- Born: May 24, 1963 (age 63) Point Pleasant, New Jersey
- Party: Republican
- Spouse: Linda Doherty
- Children: Three
- Education: United States Military Academy (BS); Seton Hall University (JD)
- Website: Legislative website

Michael J. Doherty (born May 24, 1963) is an American Republican Party politician who has served as the surrogate of Warren County, New Jersey since November 30, 2022. He previously served in the New Jersey Senate representing the 23rd Legislative District. He was sworn into the State Senate on November 23, 2009, having won the seat held by Marcia A. Karrow, who had earlier been selected by a party convention to succeed Leonard Lance after his election to the United States House of Representatives. Doherty served in the New Jersey General Assembly from 2002 to 2009.

== Early life ==
Doherty was born in Point Pleasant, New Jersey and resides in Washington Township, Warren County, New Jersey. Doherty grew up in Glen Ridge, New Jersey and graduated from Glen Ridge High School in 1981.

In 1985, Doherty graduated with a B.S. from the United States Military Academy at West Point, and was commissioned as an officer in the Field Artillery. Doherty served on active duty in the United States Army from 1985–89 and in the United States Army Reserve from 1989–93, achieving the rank of captain. He is a graduate of the United States Army Airborne School, the U.S. Army Jungle School and the Defense Language Institute (German). In the Army, he was stationed in Germany and served as a nuclear operations officer. His unit's mission was to utilize nuclear armed missiles to defend Western Europe and NATO forces from possible Soviet aggression. He was granted a Top Secret clearance to perform his nuclear duties.

Doherty and his wife, Linda, have three sons, who have served or are serving on active duty in different branches of the armed forces: Matthew, U.S. Army; Ryan, U.S. Marine Corps; and Jared, U.S. Air Force.

In 1993, he was awarded a J.D. from the Seton Hall University School of Law. Doherty is a patent attorney, specializing in semiconductor and medical device technology.

== Warren County Board of County Commissioners ==
Doherty served on the Warren County Board of County Commissioners from the 1st district . In 2000, he defeated the incumbent Freeholder Director, a Democrat, to capture control of the Freeholder Board for the Republican Party. In 2001, he served as deputy director of the Freeholder Board. He was elected to serve as the Director of the Board in both 2002 and 2003.

Doherty also began a program to reduce the county debt. He prevailed in a showdown with a Superior Court judge who threatened to jail Doherty unless he issued $5 million in bonds to fund an expansion of Warren County Community College. The New Jersey Supreme Court sided with Doherty and held that the Freeholder Board was correct to ignore the judge's order.

== New Jersey Assembly ==
Doherty was elected to the New Jersey General Assembly in 2001, and was re-elected in 2003, 2005 and 2007. He served in the Assembly on the Appropriations Committee and the Labor Committee. Early in his Assembly career, he served on the Agriculture Committee, the Housing and the Local Government Committee, and the State House Commission.

== New Jersey Senate ==
In November 2008, Doherty announced his intention to run for the State Senate seat vacated by Leonard Lance, who was elected to represent the 7th congressional district in the United States House of Representatives.

Doherty's opponent in the race was Assemblywoman Marcia A. Karrow. Hunterdon County Freeholder Matt Holt originally planned to run for the vacancy as well, but he dropped out to run for one of the Assembly vacancies opened up by Karrow or Doherty.

On January 24, 2009, a special election was held by a convention of Republican committee members from Hunterdon and Warren counties. Karrow defeated Doherty in the special election by a margin of 195 votes to 143. Doherty announced that he would run against Karrow a second time in the June 2009 primary, when she would be running as the incumbent. Doherty gave up his Assembly seat by opposing Karrow in the primary. On June 2, 2009, Doherty defeated Karrow in the Republican Senate primary by a margin of 52%-48%.

He defeated the Democratic candidate Harvey Baron in a special election on November 3, 2009, to fill the remaining two years of the Senate term, garnering 71% of the vote. He was first sworn into his Senate seat on November 23, 2009. In the Senate for the 2018-19 session, Doherty serves on the Education Committee and the Judiciary Committee. Doherty was re-elected to the Senate in November 2011, 2013 and 2017 by wide margins.

In September 2022, Doherty announced that he would retire from the Senate to seek the Warren County Surrogate’s Office. Former State GOP Chairman Doug Steinhardt announced that he would run in a special election convention in for the vacated senate seat; Doherty endorsed Steinhardt as his successor.

=== Committees ===
- Judiciary
- Education

== 2012 U.S. Senate election ==
There had been speculation that Doherty would run against incumbent Bob Menendez for United States Senator. Assemblyman John DiMaio from the same legislative district as Doherty has said he would endorse Doherty if he ran. In February 2012, Doherty announced his support for Joseph M. Kyrillos for the Republican nomination for the 2012 U.S. Senate race.

== Electoral history ==
=== New Jersey Senate ===
23rd Legislative District general election, 2021
Party	Candidate	Votes	%
Republican	Michael J. Doherty (incumbent)	46,554	60.95
Democratic	Denise T. King	29,830	39.05
Total votes		76,384	100.0
Republican hold			

New Jersey general election, 2017
Party	Candidate	Votes	%	±%
Republican	Michael J. Doherty (Incumbent)	35,676	59.1	▼8.5
Democratic	Christine Lui Chen	24,730	40.9	▲9.7
Total votes		'60,406'	'100.0'	

New Jersey State Senate elections, 2013
Party	Candidate	Votes	%
Republican	Michael J. Doherty (Incumbent)	37,477	67.6
Democratic	Gerard R. Bowers	17,311	31.2
Independent	Daniel Z. Seyler	672	1.2
Republican hold			

New Jersey State Senate elections, 2011
Party	Candidate	Votes	%
Republican	Michael J. Doherty (Incumbent)	27,750	61.3
Democratic	John Graf, Jr.	12,579	35.7
Independent	Daniel Z. Seyler	1,040	3.0
Republican hold			

Special election, November 3, 2009
Party	Candidate	Votes	%	±%
Republican	Michael J. Doherty	51,960	71.4	▲4.4
Democratic	Harvey Baron	20,851	28.6	▲1.3
Total votes		'72,811'	'100.0'	

=== New Jersey Assembly ===
New Jersey general election, 2007
Party	Candidate	Votes	%	±%
Republican	Marcia A. Karrow (Incumbent)	28,904	31.0	▲1.6
Republican	Michael J. Doherty (Incumbent)	28,857	31.0	▼0.8
Democratic	Dominick C. Santini Jr.	18,333	19.7	▼1.2
Democratic	Peter G. Maurer	17,119	18.4	▲0.6
Total votes		'93,213'	'100.0'	

New Jersey general election, 2005
Party	Candidate	Votes	%	±%
Republican	Michael J. Doherty (Incumbent)	41,753	31.8	▲1.5
Republican	Marcia A. Karrow	38,623	29.4	▼1.5
Democratic	Janice L. Kovach	27,485	20.9	▲0.6
Democratic	Scott McDonald	23,387	17.8	▼0.7
Total votes		'131,248'	'100.0'	

New Jersey general election, 2003
Party	Candidate	Votes	%	±%
Republican	Connie Myers (Incumbent)	26,122	30.9	▼1.5
Republican	Michael J. Doherty (Incumbent)	25,554	30.3	▲1.1
Democratic	Brian D. Smith	17,100	20.3	▲3.8
Democratic	Cynthia L. Ege	15,658	18.5	▲2.4
Total votes		'84,434'	'100.0'	

New Jersey general election, 2001
Party	Candidate	Votes	%
Republican	Connie Myers (Incumbent)	39,313	32.4
Republican	Michael J. Doherty	35,345	29.2
Democratic	J. Rebecca Goff	19,995	16.5
Democratic	Thomas E. Palmieri	19,454	16.1
Warren/Hunterdon Independent	Mike King	7,060	5.8
Total votes		121,167	100.0

Political offices
Preceded by Ann M. Stone	Member of the Warren County Board of Chosen Freeholders from the 1st district January 1, 2001–January 1, 2004	Succeeded by Everett A. Chamberlain
New Jersey General Assembly
Preceded by Leonard Lance	Member of the New Jersey General Assembly from the 23rd district January 8, 2002–November 23, 2009; Served alongside: Connie Myers, Marcia A. Karrow, John DiMaio	Succeeded by Erik Peterson
New Jersey Senate
Preceded by Marcia A. Karrow	Member of the New Jersey Senate from the 23rd district November 23, 2009–present	Incumbent
