= Ripoff Report =

Anonymous complaints website

- Website type: Private, for-profit
- Available in: English
- Creator: Ed Magedson
- Website: www.ripoffreport.com
- Launched: December 8, 1998
- Current status: Online

Ripoff Report is a website founded by Ed Magedson. The Ripoff Report has been online since December 1998 and is operated by Xcentric Ventures, LLC which is based in Tempe, Arizona. In 2023 an Australian judge found the company purports to be a consumer review site but profits from extortive business practices.

== Reports and rebuttals ==
Ripoff Report allows users over the age of 14 to complain anonymously about any firm or person. The site requires creating an account before "reports" can be submitted but it does not verify the identity of users. Ripoff Report results may show up on Google searches for the people (or firms) mentioned in the report, which can be potentially embarrassing or damaging for them. Reports are not automatically added to the website: they must be approved first. According to the site's Terms of Service, users are required to affirm that their reports are truthful and accurate, but the site says that it neither investigates, confirms nor corroborates the accuracy of submissions.

Companies or individuals who have been named in a report may respond with a rebuttal at the bottom of the same webpage, which explains their side of the story, if the rebuttal is approved by Ripoff Report. There is no charge to submit a rebuttal, but they must have a registered account. Alternatively, to "repair the reputation" because of something that is written in the website, Ripoff Report asks them to pay for investigations of complaints and responses carried out by "Ripoff Report's pool of Arbitrators", and to edit the webpage. According to Bloomberg Businessweek, this mechanism is an example of "how to make money rebuilding reputations: have them destroyed first", which is why a federal court stated that victims have "probable cause to sue for extortion and racketeering". As of 2021, Google Search started to consider this practice deceptive and to downrank Ripoff Report's webpages.

== Operations ==
Ripoff Report sells ad space on its website and offers companies the option to pay for complaint investigations, which can cost from US$5,500 to over $100,000. It also offers an arbitration program.

The site says that, with the exception of cases that are decided against the complainant in arbitration, all complaints remain public and unedited and authors are not allowed to remove their own reports even in cases where a mistake has been made.

In May 2013, Ripoff Report started a new service called "Ripoff Report Verified" that offers companies with no prior complaints an option to become "Verified". According to an interview with Search Engine Watch, for $89 per month, "Once a verified business gets any negative complaints, they would be alerted via email about the negative reviews and will be able to discuss a resolution with the person that left the negative reviews."

== Legal actions ==
Ripoff Report's legal page claims that "you can't sue Ripoff Report just because we provide a forum for speech" and that "Ripoff Report has had a long history of winning these types of cases. This is because of a federal law called the Communications Decency Act or CDA, 47 U.S.C. § 230." On the contrary, the United States Court of Appeals for the Ninth Circuit stated that "the Communications Decency Act does not immunize Xcentric for the content it creates and posts" and "does not immunize misrepresentations made by a publisher about its publishing conduct."

By creating an account, a user agrees to exclusive venue in Arizona for any legal dispute arising from his or her posting. In June 2013, a federal court in Maryland found that this agreement did not prevent a user from suing both the author of a report and Ripoff Report in Maryland, because the user agreement applied only to the rebuttal, not to the report.

In the Blockowicz v. Williams case, 675 F.Supp.2d 912 (N.D.Ill. 2009), a federal district court in Chicago found that Ripoff Report was not required to comply with an injunction to remove reports because it had not been named a defendant in the original lawsuit.

Two Australians sued Google over their failure to remove links to defamatory content on Ripoff Report. In February 2011 Dr Janice Duffy filed defamation proceedings in South Australia. In 2015, Duffy prevailed in her defamation case against Google for serving libelous comments, originating from Ripoff Report, and allowing its auto-complete function to assist users in finding the content. As of October 27, 2015, unresolved issues in the case are "...the defences of triviality and time limitation, the application for an extension of time, and causation and quantum of damages." Duffy sued again a year later over search results that appeared on the website between October 2015 and October 2016. Justice Tilmouth found in his judgement that search results on google.com.au were defamatory, and that Google was "proven to have participated in the communication" of the results "so as to render it liable as a secondary publisher".

In February 2013, Jarrod Sierocki filed defamation proceedings in Queensland. Sierocki won $287,788.00 in damages and interest against a former partner and client who were forced to admit that they had defamed SIerocki on Ripoff Report's un-redactable forum. A related case against Google appears to be working its way through the Australian courts as of April 23, 2015.

In website pages of Public Citizen, it was noted that Ripoff Report has received some criticism of its "Corporate Advocacy, Business Remediation & Customer Satisfaction Program," particularly whether Ripoff Report sufficiently discloses all facts that would influence the public's perception of the program.

In July 2013 the Government of India ordered a block on accessing the site. The block was removed the next month.

In May 2014 the Australian search engine Yahoo!7 blocked the Ripoff Report after multiple defamation complaints. It was unblocked after about a week.

Ripoff Report's publisher, Xcentric Ventures, LLC, unsuccessfully sued consumers and their attorneys for malicious prosecution in federal district court in Phoenix, Arizona in 2011. In August 2015, the United States 9th Circuit Court of Appeals published their order affirming the district court's order dismissing the case. The ruling notes that Xcentric had sued over the consumers' underlying attempted racketeering extortion claim, which "alleged that Xcentric attempted to extort money by encouraging third parties to post negative reviews, manipulating the posts to highlight negative reviews and to further highlight the negative reviews if the businesses posted rebuttals, and then charging high fees to 'turn the negative into a positive.' […] The claim was tenable because a district court had previously held that similar allegations stated an extortion claim against Xcentric," the 9th Circuit wrote in its order.

In 2015, the United States District Court for the District of Utah stated that, although the Ripoff Report homepage shows the tag lines "By Consumers, for consumers" and "Don't let them get away with it. Let the truth be known", the site allows competitors, and not just consumers, to post comments. The Ripoff Report home page also says: "Complaints Reviews Scams Lawsuits Frauds Reported, File your review. Consumers educating consumers", which allows a reasonable inference that the Ripoff Report encourages negative content. Moreover, Ripoff Report's webmaster affirmed that positive posts about a company are not allowed in the website. Therefore, the court concluded that the website's owner is not a neutral publisher, because, through large fees that companies must pay for the website's advocacy programs, it has an interest in, and encourages, negative content.

=== Defamation Action League ===
The now-defunct Defamation Action League (aka Internet Defamation League) was started in January 2007 by William Stanley to force the shutdown of Ripoff Report and duplicates ripoffreports.com (a typosquatted clone, with an "s" at the end) and badbusinessbureau.com (also run by Ed Magedson). The Defamation Action League claimed to be dedicated to fighting online defamation. The Defamation Action League's strategy involved "protesting" the companies which hosted Ripoff Report and badbusinessbureau.com by setting up "protest sites" and engaging in annoyance strategies such as placing classified ads with the companies' telephone numbers for products they aren't selling or sending mass emails to other customers. In return Magedson filed a lawsuit under RICO. June 21, 2007 preliminary injunction was granted against DefamationAction.com and ComplaintRemover.com. Stanley and cohorts were found liable for defamation and making death threats.

=== Litigation with the Republic of Italy ===
In March 2017, the Italian Data Protection Authority affirmed that Ripoff Report's activities — namely, Ed Magedson's requests for money to edit web pages — are illegal in Italy. The Italian authorities also noticed that Ripoff Report's web servers are occasionally not reachable from Italy in order to evade controls by the authorities themselves. Besides, they noticed that some web pages — which were being investigated by the authorities — were deleted out of the blue by the website owner, despite the claim that Ripoff Report does not remove reports.
