= Leonard Lance =

American attorney and politician (born 1952)

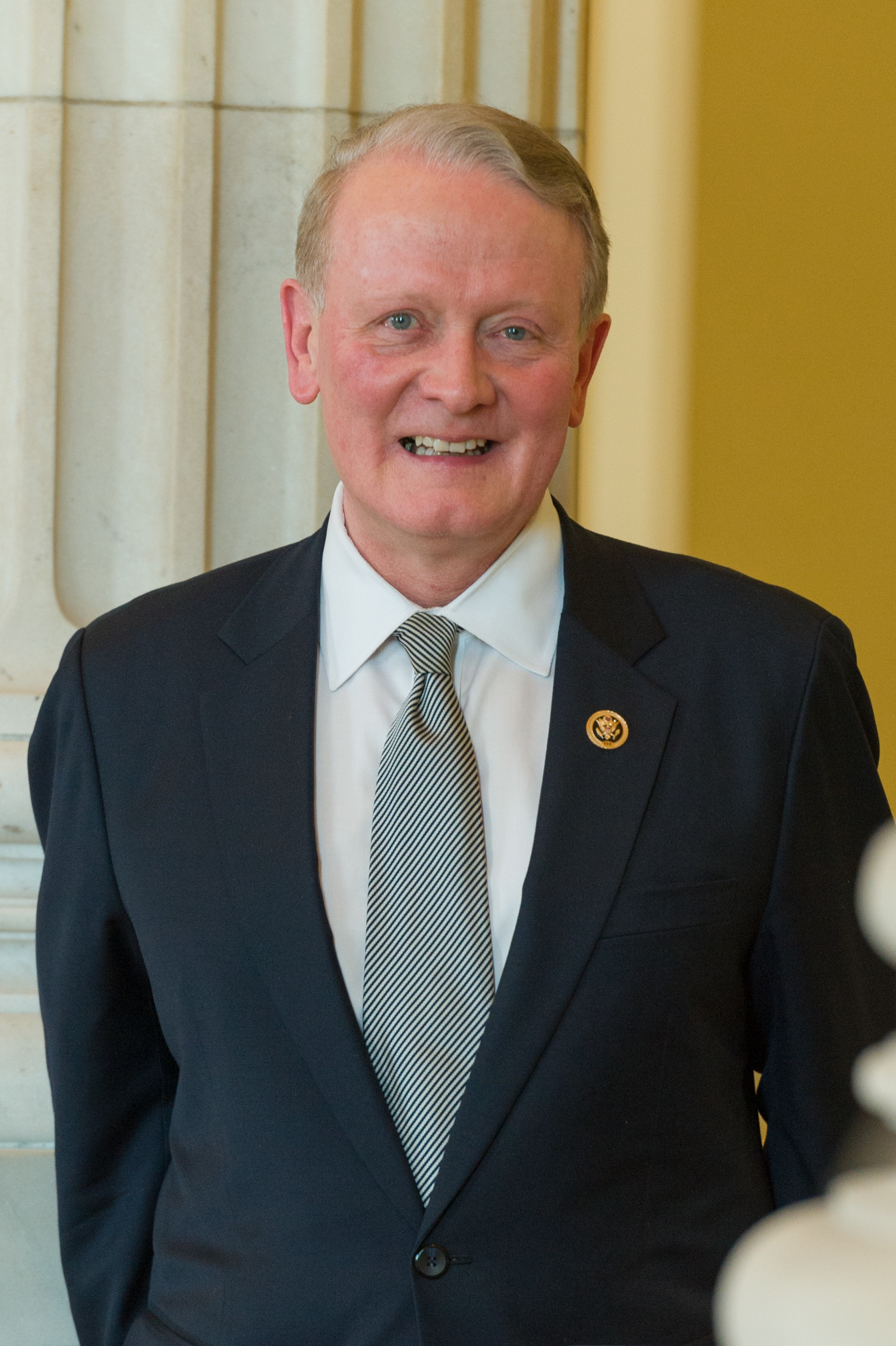

Member of the U.S. House of Representatives from New Jersey's 7th district
- In office January 3, 2009 – January 3, 2019
- Preceded by: Mike Ferguson
- Succeeded by: Tom Malinowski

Minority Leader of the New Jersey Senate
- In office January 13, 2004 – January 8, 2008
- Preceded by: Richard Codey (2002)
- Succeeded by: Thomas Kean Jr.

Member of the New Jersey Senate from the 23rd district
- In office January 8, 2002 – January 3, 2009
- Preceded by: William E. Schluter
- Succeeded by: Marcia Karrow

Member of the New Jersey General Assembly from the 23rd district
- In office February 21, 1991 – January 8, 2002 Serving with C. Richard Kamin, Chuck Haytaian and Connie Myers
- Preceded by: William E. Schluter
- Succeeded by: Michael Doherty

Personal details
- Born: Leonard John Lance; June 25, 1952 (age 74) Easton, Pennsylvania, U.S.
- Party: Republican
- Spouse: Heidi Rohrbach (m. 1996)
- Children: 1
- Education: Lehigh University (BA); Vanderbilt University (JD); Princeton University (MPA)

Leonard John Lance (born June 25, 1952) is an American politician and attorney who served as the U.S. representative for New Jersey's 7th congressional district, from 2009 to 2019. He ran for re-election in 2018, but was defeated by Democrat Tom Malinowski. He is a member of the Republican Party who previously served in the New Jersey Senate from 2002 to 2009 and the New Jersey General Assembly from 1991 to 2002.

== Early life, education, and early political career ==
Lance was born in Easton, Pennsylvania, into a political family. His parents were Anne M. (née Anderson) and Wesley Leonard Lance, who was a State Senator. His great-uncle, H. Kiefer Lance, was also active in New Jersey politics.

After attending North Hunterdon High School in Annandale, New Jersey, Lance received a B.A. from Lehigh University in 1974, a J.D. from Vanderbilt University Law School in 1977, and a M.P.A. from the Woodrow Wilson School of Public and International Affairs at Princeton University in New Jersey in 1982.

== Early career ==
Lance served as the law clerk to the Warren County Court in 1977 and 1978. He was assistant counsel for county and municipal matters to Governor of New Jersey Thomas Kean from 1983 to 1990. He was a member of the New Jersey Council on the Humanities during the Whitman Administration by appointment of the Governor.

=== New Jersey legislature ===
Lance served in the New Jersey General Assembly for 11 years (1991–2002) and served in the New Jersey Senate for 7 years (2002–2009). In 2002, he was elected to the New Jersey Senate and held the position of Minority Leader from 2004 to 2008.

==== Elections ====
In 1987, he first ran for the General Assembly. He lost the Republican primary, ranking third with 17% in New Jersey's 23rd District. Lance was appointed to the New Jersey General Assembly in February 1991 when then-Assemblyman William E. Schluter was appointed to the New Jersey Senate upon the ascension of Dick Zimmer from the New Jersey Senate to the United States House of Representatives in January 1991. After redistricting, Lance ran for the newly redrawn 23rd District in 1991, and won the Republican primary. In the general election, he ranked second with 30%, winning a seat. Incumbent Republican State Assemblyman Chuck Haytaian ranked first in the district with 33%. In 1993, Lance won re-election to a second term with 40%. In 1995, he won re-election to a third term with 34%. In 1997, he won re-election to a fourth term with 30%. In 1999, he won re-election to a fifth term with 36%.

After redistricting, he ran for the New Jersey Senate in 2001 in the 23rd District. He defeated Democrat Frederick P. Cook 69%–31%. In 2003, he won re-election to a second term with 68%. In 2007, he won re-election to a third term with 67%.

== U.S. House of Representatives ==
=== Elections ===
==== 1996 ====
In 1996, Lance sought the Republican nomination to replace Rep. Dick Zimmer, who was retiring from the House of Representatives to run for the United States Senate. Lance ran to represent New Jersey's 12th congressional district, which at that time included his residence in Clinton Township. Lance finished third in the primary behind Franklin Township Mayor Michael Pappas and New Jersey Senator John O. Bennett III. Pappas went on to win the general election.

==== 2008 ====
In 2008, Lance ran for Congress in the 7th congressional district, which now included his residence in Clinton Township. Republican Rep. Mike Ferguson was retiring after four terms in Congress. In the Republican primary, Lance faced seven candidates including former Summit Council President Kelly Hatfield, Scotch Plains Mayor Martin Marks, and Kate Whitman, daughter of former New Jersey Governor Christine Todd Whitman. On June 3, 2008, Lance won the Republican primary with 40% of the vote.

In the general election, Lance faced New Jersey Assemblywoman Linda Stender of Scotch Plains, as well as three independent and third-party candidates. Stender had been the Democratic nominee against Ferguson in 2006 and narrowly lost. The Cook Political Report rated the race as a "toss up." Lance was endorsed by The New York Times. On November 4, Lance defeated Stender by 51% to 41%. Along with Erik Paulsen of Minnesota and Joseph Cao of Louisiana, Lance was one of three non-incumbent Republicans to be elected in a district won by President Barack Obama.

In the 2008 presidential primaries, Lance supported Massachusetts Governor Mitt Romney. He later endorsed nominee John McCain.

==== 2010 ====
In 2010, Lance was challenged in the Republican primary by businessman David Larsen of Oldwick, IT consultant Alonzo Hosford of Milford, and real estate appraiser Bruce Baker of Westfield. Lance won the primary with 56% of the vote, ahead of Larsen with 31%, Hosford with 8% and Baker with 5%. Unlike the 2008 election, the 2010 7th district general election race was not considered competitive. Lance defeated educator Ed Potosnak 59% to 41%.

==== 2012 ====
Redistricting made Lance's district significantly more Republican than its predecessor. The 7th was pushed to the north, losing its share of Democratic-leaning Middlesex County in exchange for more conservative territory in Morris and Warren Counties. It also absorbed all of Hunterdon County and regained Millburn in Essex County, which had been in the district prior to 2003. In the Republican congressional primary, Lance was challenged for a second time by David Larsen. Lance defeated Larsen 61% to 39%. In the general election, Lance defeated New Jersey Assemblyman Upendra Chivukula 57% to 40%.

In the Republican presidential primaries, Lance endorsed Mitt Romney.

==== 2014 ====
Lance was challenged for a third time for the Republican nomination by David Larsen. Lance defeated Larsen 54% to 46%. In the general election, Lance defeated Town of Clinton Mayor Janice Kovachs 59% to 39%.

==== 2016 ====
In the 2016 Republican congressional primary, Lance was challenged by David Larsen for a fourth time. Businessman Craig Heard of Roxbury also ran in the primary. Lance won the primary with 54% of the vote, ahead of Larsen with 33% and Heard with 13%. In the general election, Lance faced social worker Peter Jacob. Jacob was one of 27 congressional candidates endorsed by presidential candidate Bernie Sanders. Lance defeated Jacob 54% to 43%.

==== 2018 ====
Lance lost to Democrat and former Assistant Secretary of State for Democracy, Human Rights, and Labor Tom Malinowski in the November 2018 general election. Malinowski won the election with 51.5% of the vote; Lance received 47% of the vote.

=== Tenure ===
Lance was sworn in as a Member of Congress on January 6, 2009, and was appointed to the House Financial Services Committee, where he worked on a wide range of issues relating to the financial services sector and the American economy. In 2011 Congressman Leonard Lance left the House Financial Services Committee and had been appointed to the House Energy and Commerce Committee.

In 2017, Lance was named to the House Ethics Committee.

Lance was a member of the Republican Main Street Partnership.

=== Committee assignments ===
- Committee on Energy and Commerce
  - Subcommittee on Communications and Technology (Vice Chair)
  - Subcommittee on Digital Commerce and Consumer Protection
  - Subcommittee on Health

Caucus memberships

- Congressional Arts Caucus
- Congressional NextGen 9-1-1 Caucus
- Climate Solutions Caucus

== Political views ==
Lance voted in line with Donald Trump's position 86.5% of the time, about 19 percentage points higher than expected when compared to his district's votes in the Trump's 2016 margin. Lance described himself as a "moderate conservative." He was a member of the bipartisan Problem Solvers Caucus. He was one of 23 Republicans to hold House districts that were won by Hillary Clinton in the 2016 presidential election. In 2017, his voting record was more liberal and less conservative than his lifetime record in Congress, causing Lance's ratings from conservative interest groups to dip while his ratings from liberal interest groups improved.

In the 2016 Republican presidential primaries, Lance endorsed New Jersey Governor Chris Christie. He endorsed Donald Trump in the 2016 general election.

In the 115th Congress (2017–2019), Lance voted with his party in 75.4% of the time, voted against his party 8.5% of the time, and missed 2.2% of votes. He had a similar record in the preceding 114th Congress (2015–2017).

As measured by the Lugar Center/McCourt School of Public Policy Bipartisan Index (which measures the frequency with which a member of Congress co-sponsors a bill introduced by a member of the opposite party, and the frequency with which bills introduced by the member are co-sponsored by members from the opposite party), Lance was the eighth-most bipartisan House member in the 115th Congress (2017–2019).

In 2017, Lance declined to endorse Roy Moore, the Trump-endorsed Republican candidate in the U.S. Senate special election in Alabama. Lance urged voters in Alabama to write-in an alternate Republican.

=== Budget and economy ===
In 2011 Lance voted for the Balanced Budget Amendment to the U.S. Constitution. He also opposed President Obama's American Recovery and Reinvestment Act (the 2009 economic stimulus bill).

Lance voted against the 2017 Republican tax legislation due to the bill's elimination of the state and local tax (SALT) deduction, which targeted New Jersey and other high-tax states. He was one of several New Jersey Republicans who voted against the bill.

=== Donald Trump ===
Lance criticized Trump's 2017 executive order that curtailed the immigration of people from seven countries in the Middle East, calling it "rushed and poorly implemented." Lance was supportive of Trump's nomination of Neil Gorsuch to the United States Supreme Court and his Mexico City Policy.

=== Environment ===
Lance's lifetime score from the League of Conservation Voters was 27%. As of October 2018, his rating on Clean Water Action's scorecard for the 115th congressional session was 33%.

Lance supported TransCanada's Keystone XL Pipeline, voting for the 2014 bill to authorize its construction. However, Lance opposed the PennEast Pipeline, which would cross New Jersey, citing its impact on property owners, public lands, and preservation efforts.

Lance voted to repeal the Clean Water Rule (also called the "Waters of the United States rule").

In 2014, Lance's chief of staff, Todd Mitchell, said that Lance accepted that "climate change is occurring and human activity is a contributing factor" but asserted that it was "uncertain how much of the warming is attributable to humans and how much is attributable to other factors." In 2015, Lance voted to repeal the Clean Power Plan rules published by the EPA that would have established the first national carbon dioxide emission guidelines for existing power plants. At a town hall in April 2017, he embraced the need to address man-made climate change.

In 2008, after a group opposing his candidacy sent out a mailer criticizing Lance's environmental record, Jeff Tittel of the New Jersey Sierra Club defended Lance, saying he had "an excellent record." In 2009, Lance was one of only eight Republicans in the House who voted in favor of the American Clean Energy and Security Act, a bill that included am emissions cap-and-trade provision to address global warming. However, Tittel has since soured on Lance, suggesting in a 2018 op-ed in the New Jersey Star-Ledger that Lance "used to vote for the environment and now does not."

=== Foreign policy ===
Lance was one of nine lawmakers investigated by the House Ethics Committee for taking a trip in May 2013 to Turkey and Azerbaijan paid for by the Azerbaijan state-owned oil company. Lance said that he believed the Council of Turkic American Associations, a U.S.-based nonprofit, had funded the trip, which had originally been approved by the Ethics Committee based on that understanding, and said, "I'm furious if I was misled and the House Ethics Committee was misled." Lance and the other House representatives were cleared of wrongdoing by the committee.

Lance supported the Iraq War troop surge of 2007. In 2015, Lance voted against the international nuclear agreement with Iran, and sponsored legislation to oppose additional sanctions against Iran.

=== Guns ===
According to a 2016 analysis by political nonprofit Vote Smart, Lance generally opposed gun control legislation. In 2013, Lance was criticized by the father of a Virginia Tech shooting victim who wanted Lance to be more supportive of gun control measures. In 2016, Lance disagreed with members of Congress who staged a sit-in to force a vote on gun control.

In March 2017, Lance was one of two House Republicans who broke with their party to oppose National Rifle Association-supported legislation that would block the Department of Veterans Affairs from reporting veterans considered mentally incompetent to the gun background-check database.

In December 2017, Lance opposed the Concealed Carry Reciprocity Act, which would require states to honor concealed weapons permits for people who got them in other states. Lance was one of 24 co-sponsors on legislation that would ban bump stocks.

In February 2018, Lance, along with 18 other Republican members of the U.S. House, urged House Speaker Paul Ryan to schedule a vote on legislation, introduced by U.S. Senators John Cornyn (R) and Chris Murphy (D), that would improve the national background check system for gun purchases, a measure to prevent gun violence. That same month, he called for a lifting of the 1996 federal ban of research into gun violence by the Centers for Disease Control and Prevention and co-sponsored legislation which would lift the ban.

=== Health care ===
Lance has been a critic of the Patient Protection and Affordable Care Act (Obamacare) since its inception, voting against it in 2009 and voting to repeal it on multiple occasions. Lance voted to send the American Health Care Act of 2017, the Republican Party's replacement plan for Obamacare, out of committee. He ultimately opposed the legislation on the House floor, becoming the first House Republican in New Jersey to oppose the legislation, and one of 20 who voted against the final bill.

Lance is the Republican chairman of the Rare Disease Caucus, a group whose goal is to get Members of Congress to support passing bills that help people who have rare diseases. In 2013, Lance re-introduced the Modernizing Our Drug and Diagnostic Evaluation and Regulatory Network Cures (MODDERN) Act, a bipartisan bill intended to encourage new innovative treatments for a variety of diseases and ailments. The MODDERN Drug Act proposes to reevaluate and reintroduce drugs that were once in the development phase, back into production and testing. This bill would benefit patients with a variety of ailments including but not limited to: degenerative conditions, cancer, and autoimmune diseases.

In 2014, Lance introduced the Excellence in Mental Health Act, which was signed into law by President Barack Obama later that same year. The legislation expanded access to mental health services by providing additional federal funding for community mental health centers. In 2016, Lance sponsored the Expand Excellence in Mental Health Act, which would expand the legislation's mental health planning grants into an additional 24 states.

=== Immigration ===
Lance opposes amnesty and supports requiring employers to use the e-verify background check system.

In June 2018, Lance became the lead Republican sponsor of the Reunite Children with their Parents Act, which was introduced by Democrat Brendan Boyle. The legislation seeks to "force President Donald Trump's administration to reunify the families split apart under his immigration policy." It would require the secretary of the United States Department of Homeland Security and the United States Attorney General to reunite asylum-seeking children who were taken from their parents when crossing the U.S. border.

=== Internet regulation ===
Lance was one of the 107 members of Congress who signed a letter of support towards the Federal Communications Commission's (FCC) efforts to repeal net neutrality. Lance has received $290,550 in campaign contributions from ISP companies since 1989.

In March 2017, Lance voted to reverse an FCC privacy rule that prevented internet service providers from selling their customers' browsing data. Explaining his vote, Lance said that the regulation created a "false sense of privacy" by treating internet service providers differently.

=== LGBT rights ===
Lance has a 48 out of 100 rating from the Human Rights Commission regarding his voting record on LGBT rights. Lance opposes same-sex marriage. Lance voted against repeal of Don't Ask, Don't Tell.

In 2009, he co-sponsored Barney Frank's Employment Non-Discrimination Act, a bill that would have prohibited employment discrimination on the basis of actual or perceived sexual orientation or gender identity by employers, employment agencies, labor organizations, or joint labor-management committees. He was also one of only 18 Republicans to vote for the Hate Crimes Prevention Act.

=== Marijuana ===
Lance has a "D" rating from NORML regarding his voting record on cannabis-related matters.

== Personal life ==
Lance married his wife, Heidi A. Rohrbach, previously a VP at JPMorgan Chase and currently serving as Hunterdon County Surrogate, in August 1996. They have a son named Peter Frank.

Lance is a former trustee of the Newark Museum, of Centenary College in Hackettstown and of McCarter Theatre in Princeton.

== Electoral history ==
2008 New Jersey 7th District general election
| Party | Candidate | Votes | % | ±% |
|---|---|---|---|---|
| Republican | Leonard Lance | 142,092 | 50.8% | +1.4 |
| Democratic | Linda Stender | 116,255 | 41.6% | −6.4 |
| Independent | Michael Hsing | 15,826 | 5.7% | N/A |
| Independent | Dean Greco | 3,008 | 1.1% | N/A |
| Independent | Thomas Abrams | 2,408 | .9% | −0.7 |
| Majority | | 25,837 | 9.2% | +7.7 |
| Turnout | | 279,589 | | |
| Republican hold | | Swing | −3.9% | |

2010 New Jersey 7th District general election
| Party | Candidate | Votes | % | ±% |
|---|---|---|---|---|
| Republican | Leonard Lance (incumbent) | 104,642 | 59.4% | |
| Democratic | Ed Potosnak | 71,486 | 40.6% | |
| Majority | | 33,156 | 18.9% | |
| Turnout | | 176,128 | | |
| Republican hold | | Swing | | |

2012 New Jersey 7th District general election
| Party | Candidate | Votes | % | ±% |
|---|---|---|---|---|
| Republican | Leonard Lance (incumbent) | 175,662 | 57.2% | |
| Democratic | Upendra Chivukula | 123,057 | 40.0% | |
| Independent | Dennis Breen | 4,518 | 1.5% | |
| Libertarian | Patrick McKnight | 4,078 | 1.3% | |
| Majority | | 52,605 | 17.1% | |
| Turnout | | 307,315 | | |
| Republican hold | | Swing | | |

2014 New Jersey 7th District general election
| Party | Candidate | Votes | % | ±% |
|---|---|---|---|---|
| Republican | Leonard Lance (incumbent) | 104,287 | 59.25% | |
| Democratic | Janice Kovach | 68,232 | 38.77% | |
| Libertarian | Jim Gawron | 3,478 | 1.98% | |
| Majority | | 36,055 | 20.5% | |
| Turnout | | 175,997 | | |
| Republican hold | | Swing | | |

2016 New Jersey 7th District general election
| Party | Candidate | Votes | % | ±% |
|---|---|---|---|---|
| Republican | Leonard Lance (incumbent) | 185,850 | 54.08% | |
| Democratic | Peter Jacob | 148,188 | 43.12% | |
| Libertarian | Dan O'Neill | 5,343 | 1.56% | |
| Conservative | Arthur T. Haussmann, Jr. | 4,254 | 1.24% | |
| Majority | | 37,662 | 10.96% | |
| Turnout | | 343,635 | | |
| Republican hold | | Swing | | |

2018 New Jersey 7th District general election
| Party | Candidate | Votes | % |
|---|---|---|---|
| Democratic | Tom Malinowski | 166,985 | 51.7 |
| Republican | Leonard Lance (incumbent) | 150,785 | 46.7 |
| Green | Diane Moxley | 2,676 | 0.8 |
| Independent | Gregg Mele | 2,296 | 0.7 |
| Total votes | | 322,742 | 100.0 |
| Democratic gain from Republican | | | |

New Jersey Senate
| Vacant Title last held by Richard Codey; 2002 | Minority Leader of the New Jersey Senate; 2004–2008 | Succeeded by Thomas Kean Jr. |
U.S. House of Representatives
| Preceded by Mike Ferguson | Member of the U.S. House of Representatives from New Jersey's 7th congressional district 2009–2019 | Succeeded by Tom Malinowski |
U.S. order of precedence (ceremonial)
| Preceded by Allyson Schwartz as Former U.S. Representative | Order of precedence of the United States as Former U.S. Representative | Succeeded by W.S. Stuckey Jr. as Former U.S. Representative |
