= Chris Myers (disambiguation) =

Chris Myers (born 1959) is an American sports broadcaster.

Chris or Christopher Myers may also refer to:

- Chris Myers (American football) (born 1981), American football player
- Chris Myers (footballer) (born 1969), English former professional footballer
- Chris Myers (New Jersey politician) (born 1965), American business executive and politician
- Christopher Myers, author and illustrator of children's books
- Chris John Myers, electronics engineer
- Christopher "Chris" Myers, a fictional character in The Promise (2016)
