= A.D. Amar =

Indian-American scholar

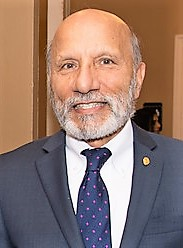
- Born: Amar Dev Krishan Singh (Juneja). India
- Education: Punjab Engineering College; Montana State University; Baruch College; City University of New York
- Organizations: Seton Hall University; Baruch College; Punjab Engineering College; Guru Nanak Dev Engineering College; Westminster Business School, London; Warsaw School of Economics; Touro College--Moscow
- Known for: Knowledge Organization Management; Leading Without Power; Ancient Wisdom Knowledge
- Spouse: Sneh Lata Amar
- Parent(s): Prem Dutt & Kaushlya Devi Shakir (Juneja)
- Awards: NJBIA Bright Idea Award in Management 2010; AOM Carolyn Dexter Finalist Award 2013; AOM Best Paper 2013 Award; AOM Best Paper 2014 Award; New York State Senate Proclamation IARC Professor of the Year Award 2016; AOM Best Symposium Proposal Award 2019

A.D. Amar (Amar Dev Amar) is an Indian-American scholar, researcher, author and educator of knowledge in organizations. Since 2001, he has been working to compile knowledge from academic, business, and millennia-year-old manuscripts for developing knowledge applications for managing organizations. To this end, he organized many scholarly and applications activities by bringing experts, thought leaders, and the learned from India and other parts of the world to cover wisdom as the goal of knowledge and how to adapt it for managing organizations. It includes knowledge of self, others, and societal entities. It covers intrinsic motivation, training, and control of mind, and the development of behavior, especially related to work. He has carried out research and disseminated it in these and other management areas at professional levels using the platforms of the prominent global professional and scholarly societies such as the Academy of Management (AOM), the International Federation of Operational Research Societies (IFORS), and the Association of European Operational Research Societies (EURO). For his contributions, initiatives, and achievements, he has received many honors and is listed among the Harvard Business School Profiles in Business and Management, International Directory of Scholars and Their Research of the Harvard Business School Publishing, Who's Who in Frontiers Science and Technology, among others.

== Early life and background ==
Amar was born in Punjab, in British India, right before the 1947 breakup of Punjab into Pakistan-controlled West and India-controlled East portions and was carried across the border by his parents who walked into the Indian territory from the current-day Pakistan over the bridge dividing the two. His family, the Junejas, warriors and peace-time businessmen and landlord farmers, were courted by Maharaja Ranjit Singh (1st Maharaja of the Sikh Empire) by sending his trusted General Hari Singh Nalwa (who later became the Commander-in-Chief of his invasion forces) to the Junejas who then lived in Dasuya-Mukerian in Hoshiarpur District of the undivided Punjab in British India. The Maharaja invited the Junejas to join his forces to invade and conquer Kabul to control the atrocities being committed against the Hindus. The Junejas then made the Juneja Regiment, their own regiment, in the Maharaja's invasion forces. On victory over Afghanistan and other territories, in 1837, the Junejas were incentivized, became landlords and stayed back. Their 1947 return to the India-held portion of Punjab was like their coming home after more than a century of warring around the northern territories.

Amar studied science and engineering at the Punjab Engineering College of the Panjab University in India, where he earned his B.Sc. in Production Engineering (With Honors). He moved to the US to continue his studies to earn an M.S. degree in Industrial & Management Engineering at Montana State University Bozeman, that he earned in the shortest period legally allowed, and then moved on to The Graduate School and University Center, the City University of New York on Fellowship A for his doctoral studies in business management. He earned his Ph.D. in Business and became the first among those who entered the doctoral program with him, and some even before him.

Since 2021, he has been accepted, through Seton Hall University—where he has been a professor of management, as an affiliate of the Harvard Business School's Michael Porter's MOC (Microeconomics of Competitiveness) at the Institute for Strategy and Competitiveness at Harvard University.

== Career ==
Amar started his career in designing and manufacturing machine tools at Orisun Machine Tools in Chandigarh, India and moved to electronic systems at Teledyne Pacific Industrial Controls in Oakland, California, and systems design at Arkwin Industries in Westbury, NY, where in 1978, he applied the concepts of artificial intelligence to give visibility to complex processes at job shops and published a few papers on this. He joined the faculty of the Stillman School of Business at Seton Hall University in 1983 where he has been training mostly graduate students in the areas of knowledge and technology organization management, production and service operations, and management theory and practice. Amar has also served on the faculties of Punjab Engineering College, India; Westminster Business School-- London, U.K.; Touro College-- Arbat of Moscow, Russia; Warsaw School of Economics-- Warsaw, Poland; and the East West University, Shanghai, China, among others.

In addition to imparting knowledge through his publications that initially were in engineering and technology, particularly in testing and designing scheduling algorithms, Amar expanded the scope of his research and publications to enhance the working and efficiency of the knowledge organizations. He has also been lecturing on these topics around the world and had been writing for various journals on the subject related to knowledge in organizations and other related fields, covering management, technology and engineering.

As the need for managing contemporary organizations changed with globalization, the well-accepted theories and practices of management were updated by Amar to suit the evolving demands of management professionals. He switched his focus of research and publications to fit the rise of innovation and technology in processes, the shifting of organizational paradigms, and the expansion of decision criteria. For example, since the role of authority in managing humans in groups was reduced, he integrated managing, specifically leading—without using power by bringing in mind and meditation, and holistic and spiritual processes for effectivity and efficiency of innovation and technology in organizations, and knowledge management.

Besides his academic career, Amar has been involved in civic activism. He has served and currently serves on several editorial and public boards. In 2008, he was a candidate for the Republican Primary from the New Jersey's 7th Congressional District U.S. House of Representative seat. In the 2016 Presidential Campaign, Amar served as the founding president of the "Indian-Americans for Trump 2016" PAC. Amar was one of the three university personalities to endorse Donald Trump before the start of the GOP primary season, saying, "I've been observing his style and management for many years..., there is a kind of unpredictability and a kind of drama. In his actual management and his execution, there is no drama, and there is no unpredictability. As a result of his commitment to Indian-American participation in politics, he was awarded Professor of the Year by the Indian American Republican Committee and by the Proclamation of the New York State Senate.

== Works ==
Amar has authored 145 works in various journals, periodicals, and other outlets such as the European Journal of Innovation Management, Harvard Business Review, Organizational Dynamics, IIE Transactions, International Journal of Production Research, Computers and Industrial Engineering, and IEEE Transactions on Engineering Management. For example, his article titled "Motivating knowledge workers to innovate: a model integrating motivation dynamics and antecedents" had full-text downloads of 17,295 times since 2013. It has been the 5th Most Read Article of 2015 and the 8th Most Read Article of 2016 of the European Journal of Innovation Management.

Among Amar's books is Managing Knowledge Workers: Unleashing Innovation and Productivity (2001, Quorum Books—Greenwood Group Publishing) which is written for management scholars and managers, with the main goal of providing them the theory and practice of how to manage knowledge workers and knowledge organizations for getting human innovation and higher productivity. As Professor Borj O Saxberg, in his review for Personnel Psychology wrote: the book "would be of particular interest to human resource management professionals and for use in graduate courses on technology management and change.

The book has been cited by many authors, researchers, practitioners, and scholars in their works such as the International Journal of Human Resource Management, Personnel Psychology, Human Resource Management, HRMagazine, and the Journal of the Learning Sciences. The book also earned high recognition from industry professionals. For instance, Dr. Rod Hadi, World Wide Director of Erico International Corp, commented on Amar's book: "one of the best books I have ever read regarding this subject" and it "presents an amazing approach to managing highly talented employees."

== Honors and Recognitions ==
Amar's academic works have been honored by a variety of professional organizations and societies. The New Jersey Policy Research Organization (NJPRO) Foundation of New Jersey Business and Industry Association bestowed on Amar the NJBIA Bright Idea Award in Management for his coauthored paper titled "To be a better leader, give up authority." The Academy of Management awarded him the 2013 Carolyn Dexter Award (Finalist) for his paper (with Tamwatin and Hlupic) on enhancing emotional intelligence and skill levels of senior managers by practicing meditation. The academy recognized him by designating this paper a Best Paper of its 2013 Annual Meeting. In 2014, the academy recognized another of his papers on meditation and the managerial skills of CEOs (with Tamwatin and Hlupic) by listing it as a Best Paper. And for his handling of the difficult subjects, in 2016, he was awarded the Professor of the Year recognition by the Indian American Republican Committee. At the 2019 Academy of Management Annual Conference, Amar organized a symposium that won the "MSR Best Symposium Proposal" award.

Amar has served as an external examiner on many management Ph.D. dissertation committees, particularly for the Indian Institute of Science, University of Madras, University of Delhi, University of South Australia, and the University of Pondicherry. He has also served on the editorial boards of several journals, such as the International Journal of Management Education, European Journal of Innovation Management, Computers and Operations Research, and the Academy of Management. In addition, Amar has served as the Director and Editor-In-Chief of The Mid-Atlantic Journal of Business for twelve years, and is currently serving as the founding Principal Editor of the Corporate Governance Insight published by the Global Research Foundation of Corporate Governance.

== Publications ==
- To be a better leader, give up authority (2009) – Harvard Business Review
- Motivating knowledge workers to innovate: A model integrating motivation dynamics and antecedents (2004) – European Journal of Innovation Management
- Managing knowledge workers: Unleashing innovation and productivity (2002) – Greenwood Publishing Group
- Knowledge management, strategy, and technology: a global snapshot (2004) – Journal of Enterprise Information Management
- Model and workings of China's socialist market economy: goals and strategy to be the sole global superpower (2015) – Journal of Commerce and Business Studies
- Impact of wireless telecommunications standards and regulation on the evolution of wireless technologies and services over Internet protocol (2006) – Telecommunications Policy
- Leading for innovation through symbiosis (2001) – European Journal of Innovation Management
- A descriptive model of innovation and creativity in organizations: a synthesis of research and practice (2008) – Knowledge Management Research & Practice
- Simulated versus real life data in testing the efficiency of scheduling algorithms (1986) – IIE transactions
- Controls and creativity in organization (1998) – The Mid-Atlantic Journal of Business
- How managers succeed by letting employees lead (2012) – Organizational Dynamics
- Leadership for knowledge organizations (2016) – European Journal of Innovation Management
