= 2008 United States presidential election in New Jersey =

- November 4, 2008
- Turnout: 72.69% (▲0.06%)

Nominee	Barack Obama	John McCain
Party	Democratic	Republican
Home state	Illinois	Arizona
Running mate	Joe Biden	Sarah Palin
Electoral vote	15	0
Popular vote	2,215,422	1,613,207
Percentage	57.14%	41.61%

Obama
40–50%
50–60%
60–70%
70–80%
80–90%
90–100%
McCain
40–50%
50–60%
60–70%
70–80%
90–100%
Tie
President before election
George W. Bush
Republican
Elected President
Barack Obama
Democratic

The 2008 United States presidential election in New Jersey took place on November 4, 2008, and was part of the 2008 United States presidential election. Voters chose 15 representatives, or electors to the Electoral College, who voted for president and vice president.

New Jersey was won by Democratic nominee Barack Obama with a 15.53% margin of victory. Prior to the election, all 17 news organizations considered this a state Obama would win, or otherwise considered as a safe blue state. No fundraising money was spent by either campaign, as the state has trended towards the Democratic Party in recent years. A highly affluent and predominantly urban state with an ethnically diverse population, New Jersey has become a reliably blue state, and this was evident again when Democrat Barack Obama comfortably won the state's 15 electoral votes with 57.14% of the vote.

New Jersey weighed in for this election as 8.3% more Democratic than the national average.

== Primary elections ==
=== Democratic primary ===
The Democratic primary took place February 5, 2008, also known as Super Tuesday. Hillary Clinton won this primary.

Key:	Withdrew prior to contest

2008 New Jersey Democratic presidential primary
Candidate	Votes	Percentage	National delegates
Hillary Clinton	613,500	53.76%	59
Barack Obama	501,372	43.93%	48
John Edwards	15,728	1.38%	0
Joe Biden	4,081	0.36%	0
Bill Richardson	3,366	0.29%	0
Dennis Kucinich	3,152	0.28%	0
Totals	1,141,199	100.00%	107

=== Republican primary ===
The Republican primary took place on February 5, 2008, with 52 national delegates who were allocated on a winner takes all basis.

Official Results
Candidate	Votes	Percentage	Delegates
John McCain	313,459	55.36%	52
Mitt Romney	160,388	28.33%	0
Mike Huckabee	46,284	8.17%	0
Ron Paul	27,184	4.06%	0
Rudy Giuliani*	15,516	2.74%	0
Fred Thompson*	3,253	0.57%	0
Total	566,201	100%	52

* Candidate dropped out of the race before the primary

== Campaign ==
=== Predictions ===
There were 16 news organizations who made state-by-state predictions of the election. Here are their last predictions before election day:

Source	Ranking
D.C. Political Report	Likely D
Cook Political Report	Solid D
The Takeaway	Solid D
Electoral-vote.com	Solid D
Washington Post	Solid D
Politico	Solid D
RealClearPolitics	Solid D
FiveThirtyEight	Solid D
CQ Politics	Solid D
The New York Times	Solid D
CNN	Safe D
NPR	Solid D
MSNBC	Solid D
Fox News	Likely D
Associated Press	Likely D
Rasmussen Reports	Safe D

=== Polling ===
Pre-election polling was tight early on. However, since October 12, Obama won each poll with a double-digit margin of victory and with at least 52%. McCain didn't reach over 42% in that stretch. The final 3 polls found Obama leading with 55% to 39%.

=== Fundraising ===
John McCain raised a total of $4,761,251 in the state. Barack Obama raised $13,624,081.

=== Advertising and visits ===
Neither candidate spent anything here. The Republican ticket visited the state twice. Obama visited the state once.

== Analysis ==
New Jersey was once one of the most reliably Republican states in the Northeast. From 1948 to 1988, it voted Republican in all but two elections: John F. Kennedy in his narrow victory over Richard Nixon in 1960, and Lyndon Johnson's 44-state landslide of 1964. However, the brand of Republicanism practiced in New Jersey has historically been a moderate one. As the national party tilted more to the right, the state's voters became more friendly to Democrats. The state narrowly went for Bill Clinton in 1992 and has voted Democratic in every election since then. In all but two elections since 1996, the Democrats have carried it by double digits. While Republicans remain competitive at the state and local level, at the presidential level New Jersey is now reckoned as part of the solid bloc of blue states in the Northeast.

Democrats have several structural advantages in New Jersey during presidential elections. The northeastern portion, including Newark, Jersey City, Elizabeth and Paterson, contains more than half the state's population and is heavily Democratic. The southwestern portion, including Camden, Cherry Hill, and Atlantic City is also heavily Democratic. These regions have a total of over 2,000,000 voters between them, making it extremely difficult for a Republican to carry the state. For instance, in 2004 George W. Bush held John Kerry to only a 7-point margin of victory, but was completely shut out in the northeast and southwest. Additionally, the state is split almost down the middle between the largest and fourth-largest markets in the country, New York City and Philadelphia. As a result, statewide races often feature some of the most expensive advertising budgets in the country.

Unlike in 2004, New Jersey was called for Obama almost as soon as the polls closed. Obama dominated the urban areas of the state, winning Essex County by over 50%, Hudson County by 47%, Camden and Mercer counties by 35%. Obama also won Somerset County, which had voted Republican in every election from 1968 to 2004. Most of the southern portion of the state voted Democratic. McCain won most of Northwestern New Jersey, winning in Republican strongholds like Morris County and Sussex County (which McCain won by 21%). McCain also won most of the Jersey Shore counties.

At the same time, incumbent Democratic U.S. Senator Frank Lautenberg was reelected over Republican Dick Zimmer by a 14.08% margin of victory. Lautenberg received 56.03% of the total vote while Zimmer took in 41.95%. Democrats also picked up a vacant U.S. House seat in New Jersey's 3rd congressional district that was previously held by a Republican; Democrat John Adler defeated Republican Chris Myers by a 3.30% margin of victory. Adler received 51.65% of the vote while Myers took in 48.35%.

== Results ==
2008 United States presidential election in New Jersey
Party	Candidate	Running mate	Votes	Percentage	Electoral votes
Democratic	Barack Obama	Joe Biden	2,215,422	57.14%	15
Republican	John McCain	Sarah Palin	1,613,207	41.61%	0
Independent	Ralph Nader	Matt Gonzalez	21,298	0.55%	0
Libertarian	Bob Barr	Wayne Allyn Root	8,441	0.22%	0
Write-ins	Write-ins		7,718	0.20%	0
Constitution	Chuck Baldwin	Darrell Castle	3,956	0.10%	0
Green	Cynthia McKinney	Rosa Clemente	3,636	0.09%	0
Socialist	Brian Moore	Stewart Alexander	669	0.02%	0
Vote Here	Jeffrey Boss	Andrea Maria Boss	639	0.02%	0
Socialist Workers	Róger Calero	Alyson Kennedy	523	0.01%	0
Socialism and Liberation	Gloria La Riva	Eugene Puryear	416	0.01%	0
Totals			3,877,323	100.00%	15
Voter Turnout (Voting age/Registered)				60%/73%	

=== By county ===
Sample ballot for the general election, showing the presidential candidates running in New Jersey

County	Barack Obama Democratic		John McCain Republican		Various candidates Other parties		Margin		Total votes cast
County	#	%	#	%	#	%	#	%	Total votes cast
Atlantic	67,830	56.88%	49,902	41.85%	1,517	1.27%	17,928	15.03%	119,249
Bergen	225,367	54.19%	186,118	44.75%	4,424	1.06%	39,249	9.44%	415,909
Burlington	131,219	58.64%	89,626	40.05%	2,930	1.31%	41,593	18.59%	223,775
Camden	159,259	67.37%	73,819	31.23%	3,304	1.40%	85,440	36.14%	236,382
Cape May	22,893	44.90%	27,288	53.52%	802	1.58%	-4,395	-8.62%	50,983
Cumberland	34,919	60.00%	22,360	38.42%	915	1.58%	12,559	21.58%	58,194
Essex	240,306	75.91%	74,063	23.40%	2,181	0.69%	166,243	52.51%	316,550
Gloucester	77,267	55.21%	60,315	43.10%	2,364	1.69%	16,952	12.11%	139,946
Hudson	154,140	72.84%	55,360	26.16%	2,116	1.00%	98,780	46.68%	211,616
Hunterdon	29,776	42.53%	39,092	55.83%	1,147	1.64%	-9,316	-13.30%	70,015
Mercer	107,926	67.29%	50,223	31.32%	2,229	1.39%	57,703	35.97%	160,378
Middlesex	193,812	60.21%	123,695	38.43%	4,367	1.36%	70,117	21.78%	321,874
Monmouth	148,737	47.46%	160,433	51.19%	4,244	1.35%	-11,696	-3.73%	313,414
Morris	112,275	45.36%	132,331	53.46%	2,913	1.18%	-20,056	-8.10%	247,519
Ocean	110,189	40.07%	160,677	58.43%	4,111	1.50%	-50,488	-18.36%	274,977
Passaic	113,257	60.34%	72,552	38.65%	1,904	1.01%	40,705	21.69%	187,713
Salem	16,044	50.88%	14,816	46.99%	672	2.13%	1,228	3.89%	31,532
Somerset	79,321	52.38%	70,085	46.28%	2,024	1.34%	9,236	6.10%	151,430
Sussex	28,840	38.75%	44,184	59.37%	1,393	1.88%	-15,344	-20.62%	74,417
Union	141,417	63.58%	78,768	35.41%	2,241	1.01%	62,649	28.17%	222,426
Warren	20,628	42.01%	27,500	56.00%	980	1.99%	-6,872	-13.99%	49,108
Totals	2,215,422	57.14%	1,613,207	41.61%	48,778	1.26%	602,215	15.53%	3,877,407

Counties that flipped from Republican to Democratic

- Salem (largest municipality: Pennsville Township)
- Somerset (largest municipality: Franklin Township)

=== By congressional district ===
Barack Obama carried ten of New Jersey's 13 congressional districts, including two that elected Republicans.

District	Obama	McCain	Representative
1st	65%	34%	Rob Andrews
2nd	54%	45%	Frank LoBiondo
3rd	52%	47%	Jim Saxton (110th Congress)
3rd	52%	47%	John Adler (111th Congress)
4th	46%	52%	Chris Smith
5th	45%	54%	Scott Garrett
6th	59%	39%	Frank Pallone Jr.
7th	51%	48%	Mike Ferguson (110th Congress)
7th	51%	48%	Leonard Lance (111th Congress)
8th	63%	36%	Bill Pascrell
9th	61%	38%	Steve Rothman
10th	87%	13%	Donald M. Payne
11th	45%	54%	Rodney Frelinghuysen
12th	58%	41%	Rush Holt Jr.
13th	75%	24%	Albio Sires

== Electors ==
Technically the voters of NJ cast their ballots for electors: representatives to the Electoral College. NJ is allocated 15 electors because it has 13 congressional districts and 2 senators. All candidates who appear on the ballot or qualify to receive write-in votes must submit a list of 15 electors, who pledge to vote for their candidate and their running mate. Whoever wins the majority of votes in the state is awarded all 15 electoral votes. Their chosen electors then vote for president and vice president. Although electors are pledged to their candidate and running mate, they are not obligated to vote for them. An elector who votes for someone other than their candidate is known as a faithless elector.

The electors of each state and the District of Columbia met on December 15, 2008, to cast their votes for president and vice president. The Electoral College itself never meets as one body. Instead the electors from each state and the District of Columbia met in their respective capitols.

The following were the members of the Electoral College from the state. All 15 were pledged to Barack Obama and Joe Biden:

1. Jose Colon
2. William Fontanez
3. Gina Genovese
4. Wilma Grey
5. Kevin Halpern
6. Victor Herlinsky
7. Stacy Lubrecht
8. Salaheddin Mustafa
9. Peter Nichols
10. William W. Northgrave
11. Ken Saunders
12. Ginger Gold Schnitzer
13. Carl Styles
14. Shavonda Sumter
15. Stephen Weinstein

== See also ==
- United States presidential elections in New Jersey
- Presidency of Barack Obama
- 2008 Democratic Party presidential primaries
- 2008 New Jersey Republican presidential primary
