= 2008 United States House of Representatives elections in New Jersey =

- November 4, 2008

All 13 New Jersey seats to the United States House of Representatives
- Turnout: 73% (▲25pp)
	Majority party	Minority party
Party	Democratic	Republican
Last election	7	6
Seats won	8	5
Seat change	▲1	▼1
Popular vote	1,911,827	1,461,820
Percentage	55.61%	42.52%
Swing	▼0.91%	▲0.25%

Democratic
40–50%
50–60%
60–70%
70–80%
90–100%
Republican
40–50%
50–60%
60–70%

The 2008 congressional elections in New Jersey were held on November 4, 2008 to determine who would represent the state of New Jersey in the United States House of Representatives. New Jersey has thirteen seats in the House, apportioned according to the 2000 United States census. Representatives are elected for two-year terms; those elected served in the 111th Congress from January 4, 2009 until January 3, 2011. The election coincided with the 2008 U.S. presidential election.

The statewide party primary elections were held June 3, 2008. District 3 was the only seat which changed party (from open Republican to Democratic), although CQ Politics had forecasted districts 3, 5 and 7 to be at some risk for the incumbent party. This is the last time that any district saw one party run uncontested (in this case, the 10th) until 2026.

== Overview ==
United States House of Representatives elections in New Jersey, 2008
Party	Votes	Percentage	Seats	+/–
Democratic	1,911,827	55.61%	8	▲1
Republican	1,461,820	42.52%	5	▼1
Green	12,554	0.37%	0	Steady
Libertarian	1,600	0.05%	0	Steady
Constitution	1,551	0.05%	0	Steady
Independents	48,628	1.41%	0	Steady
Totals	3,437,980	100.00%	13	—

== District 1 ==
2008 New Jersey's 1st congressional district election
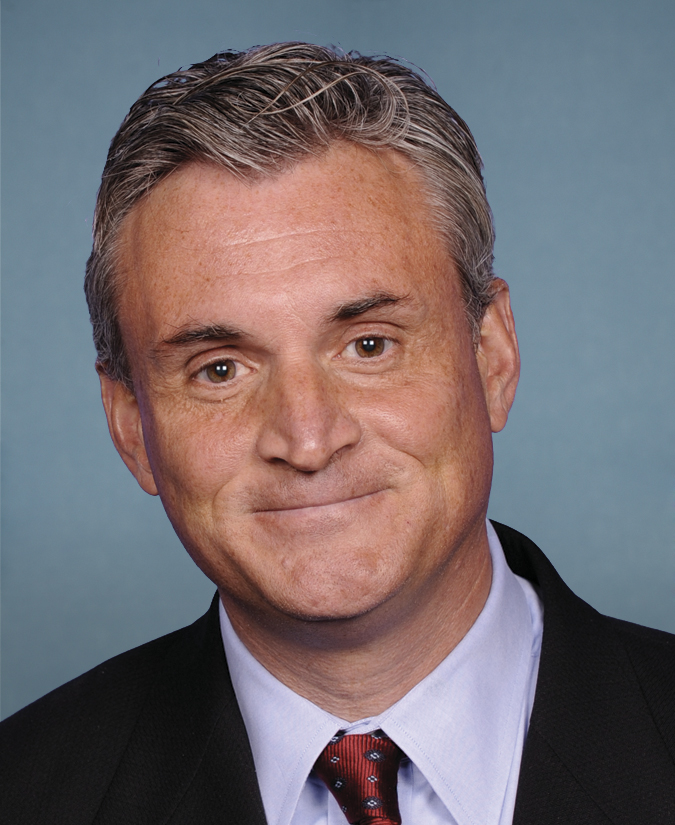

Nominee	Rob Andrews	Dale Glading
Party	Democratic	Republican
Popular vote	206,453	74,001
Percentage	72.4%	25.9%
- County results Andrews: 60–70% 70–80%
U.S. Representative before election
Rob Andrews
Democratic
Elected U.S. Representative
Rob Andrews
Democratic

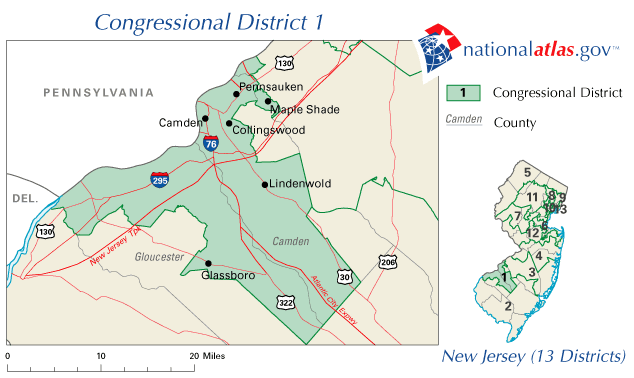

This district contains all or parts of Burlington, Camden and Gloucester counties.

=== Democratic primary ===
==== Candidates ====
- Camille Andrews, wife of incumbent U.S. Representative Rob Andrews
- John Caramanna
- David G. Evans
- Mahdi Ibn-Ziyad

===== Declined =====
- Rob Andrews, incumbent Representative from Haddon Heights since 1990 (ran for U.S. Senate)

Incumbent Democrat Rob Andrews, in a surprise move on April 2, 2008, announced that he would challenge incumbent United States Senator Frank Lautenberg in the June primary. His House seat, which was reliably Democratic (CPVI D+14), thus became an open seat. However, the filing deadline for primary candidates was April 7, leaving only a few days for candidates to declare. As a result, Andrews's wife Camille, who had the organizational support of all three county parties within the district, was the lone candidate to join the race following his withdrawal.

==== Results ====
2008 Democratic U.S. House primary
Party	Candidate	Votes	%
Democratic	Camille Andrews	32,108	83.03%
Democratic	John Caramanna	4,342	11.23%
Democratic	Mahdi Ibn-Ziyad	2,222	5.75%
Democratic	David G. Evans	0	0.00%
Total votes		38,672	100.00%

=== Republican primary ===
==== Candidates ====
- Dale Glading, founder of Saints Prison Ministry
- Fernando Powers

==== Results ====
2008 Republican U.S. House primary
Party	Candidate	Votes	%
Republican	Dale M. Glading	5,873	82.27%
Republican	Fernando Powers	1,266	17.73%
Total votes		7,139	100.00%

=== General election ===
==== Candidates ====
- Rob Andrews, incumbent Representative from Haddon Heights since 1990 (Democratic)
- Margaret M. Chapman (Back to Basics)
- Dale Glading, founder of Saints Prison Ministry (Republican)
- Alvin Lindsay Jr. (Lindsay for Congress)
- Matthew Thieke (Green)
- Everitt M. Williams III (Think Independently)

===== Withdrew =====
- Camille Andrews, wife of incumbent U.S. Representative Rob Andrews (Democratic) (withdrew September 3)

After his defeat in the U.S. Senate primary, Rob Andrews decided to run for re-election to his House seat. His wife Camille, who had won the Democratic nomination in the June primary, withdrew on September 3, and Rob Andrews announced on September 4 that he would take her place as the Democratic candidate. He maintained that his wife had not been merely a placeholder candidate and said that he had only decided to run one week before his announcement. According to Andrews, his change of heart was a result of personal reflection.

==== Predictions ====
Source	Ranking	As of
The Cook Political Report	Safe D	November 6, 2008
Rothenberg	Safe D	November 2, 2008
Sabato's Crystal Ball	Safe D	November 6, 2008
Real Clear Politics	Safe D	November 7, 2008
CQ Politics	Safe D	November 6, 2008

==== Results ====
2008 U.S. House election
Party	Candidate	Votes	%	±%
Democratic	Rob Andrews (incumbent)	206,453	72.40%	▼27.60
Republican	Dale Glading	74,001	25.95%	N/A
Green	Matthew Thieke	1,927	0.68%	N/A
Independent	Margaret M. Chapman	1,258	0.44%	N/A
Independent	Everitt M. Williams III	1,010	0.35%	N/A
Independent	Alvin Lindsay Jr.	508	0.18%	N/A
Total votes		285,157	100.00%	

==== By county ====
County	Rob Andrews Democratic		Dale Glading Republican		Various candidates Other parties		Margin		Total votes cast
County	#	%	#	%	#	%	#	%	Total votes cast
Burlington (part)	8,262	68.5%	3,525	29.2%	279	2.3%	4,737	39.3%	12,066
Camden (part)	134,011	75.1%	41,971	23.5%	2,366	1.3%	92,040	51.6%	178,348
Gloucester (part)	64,180	67.7%	28,505	30.1%	2,078	2.2%	35,675	37.6%	94,743
Totals	206,453	72.4%	74,001	26.0%	4,703	1.6%	132,452	46.4%	285,157

== District 2 ==
2008 New Jersey's 2nd congressional district election
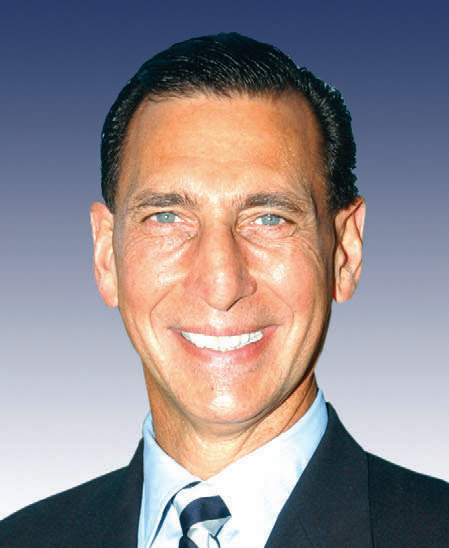

Nominee	Frank LoBiondo	David Kurkowski
Party	Republican	Democratic
Popular vote	167,701	110,990
Percentage	59.1%	39.1%
- County results *: 50–60% 60–70%
U.S. Representative before election
Frank LoBiondo
Republican
Elected U.S. Representative
Frank LoBiondo
Republican

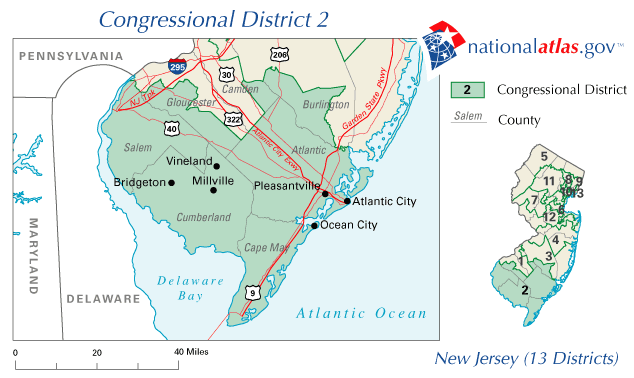

This district lies in the southern part of the state, containing all or portions of Atlantic, Burlington, Camden, Cape May: Cumberland, Gloucester and Salem counties.

=== Republican primary ===
==== Candidates ====
- Frank LoBiondo, incumbent Representative from Millville since 1995
- Donna M. Ward

==== Results ====
2008 Republican U.S. House primary
Party	Candidate	Votes	%
Republican	Frank LoBiondo (incumbent)	16,026	88.78%
Republican	Donna M. Ward	2,025	11.22%
Total votes		18,051	100.00%

=== Democratic primary ===
==== Candidates ====
- Dave Kurkowski, Cape May councilman

==== Results ====
2008 Democratic U.S. House primary
Party	Candidate	Votes	%
Democratic	David Kurkowski	16,465	100.00%
Total votes		16,465	100.00%

=== General election ===
==== Candidates ====
- Peter F. Boyce (Constitution)
- Jason M. Grover (Green)
- Dave Kurkowski, Cape May councilman (Democratic)
- Frank LoBiondo, incumbent Representative from Millville since 1995 (Republican)
- Costantino Rozzo (Socialist)
- Gary Stein (Rock the Boat)

Campaign contributions from OpenSecrets

==== Predictions ====
Source	Ranking	As of
The Cook Political Report	Safe R	November 6, 2008
Rothenberg	Safe R	November 2, 2008
Sabato's Crystal Ball	Safe R	November 6, 2008
Real Clear Politics	Safe R	November 7, 2008
CQ Politics	Safe R	November 6, 2008

==== Results ====
2008 U.S. House election
Party	Candidate	Votes	%	±%
Republican	Frank LoBiondo (incumbent)	167,701	59.06%	▼2.55
Democratic	David Kurkowski	110,990	39.09%	▲3.49
Green	Jason M. Grover	1,763	0.62%	N/A
Constitution	Peter F. Boyce	1,551	0.55%	N/A
Independent	Gary Stein	1,312	0.46%	N/A
Socialist	Costantino Rozzo	648	0.23%	▲0.02
Total votes		283,965	100.00%	

==== By county ====
County	Frank LoBiondo Republican		David Kurkowski Democratic		Various candidates Other parties		Margin		Total votes cast
County	#	%	#	%	#	%	#	%	Total votes cast
Atlantic	62,810	57.5%	45,166	41.3%	1,297	1.1%	17,644	16.2%	109,273
Burlington (part)	2,137	66.9%	1,012	31.7%	44	1.3%	1,125	35.2%	3,193
Camden (part)	2,454	50.2%	2,359	48.3%	74	1.5%	95	1.9%	4,887
Cape May	30,828	66.1%	14,828	31.8%	904	2.0%	16,000	34.3%	46,615
Cumberland	29,374	55.9%	21,854	41.6%	1,273	2.4%	7,520	14.3%	52,501
Gloucester (part)	21,136	57.5%	14,862	40.4%	774	2.1%	6,274	17.1%	36,772
Salem	18,962	61.7%	10,909	35.5%	853	2.8%	8,053	26.2%	30,274
Totals	167,701	59.1%	110,990	39.1%	5,274	1.9%	56,711	20.0%	283,965

== District 3 ==
2008 New Jersey's 3rd congressional district election
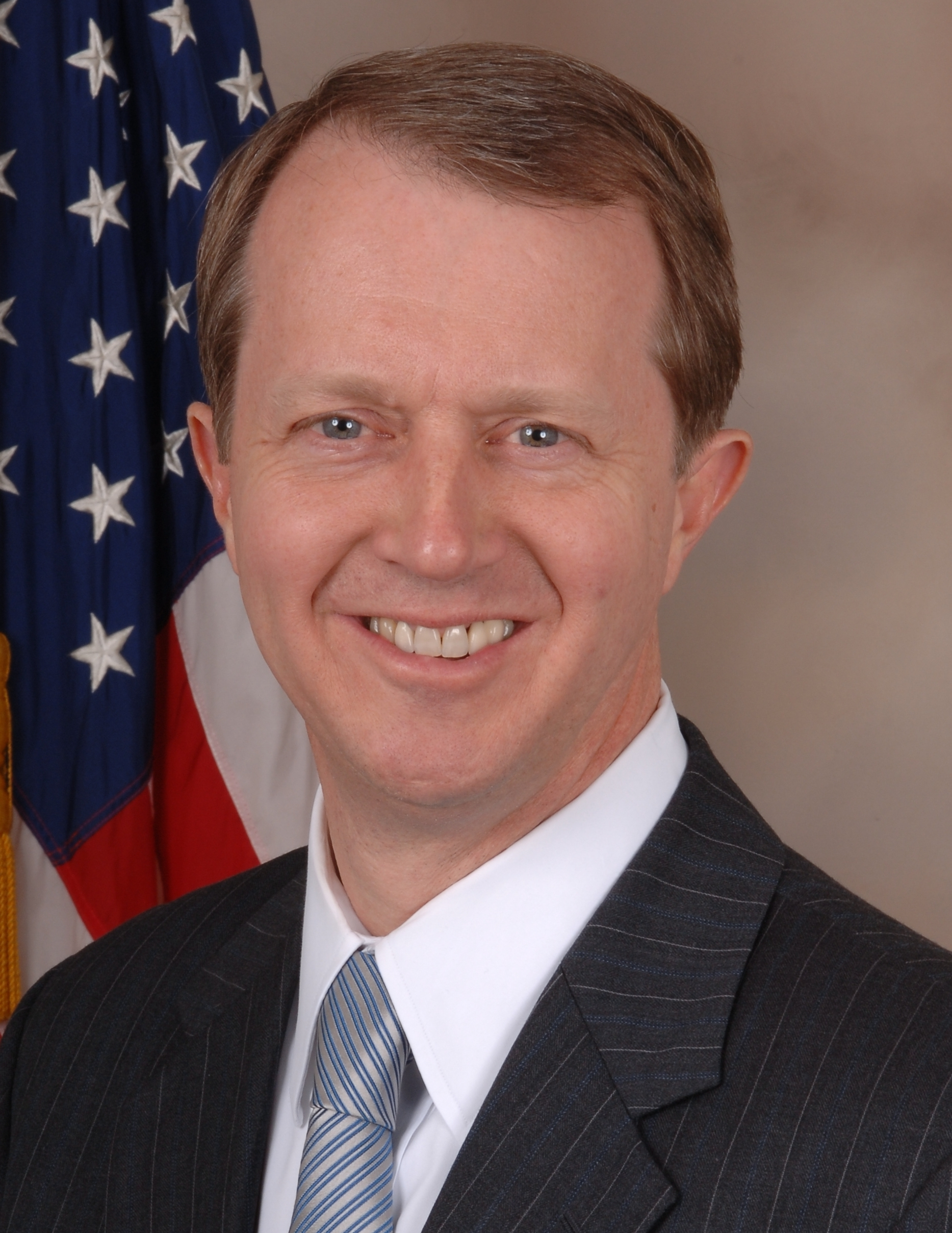

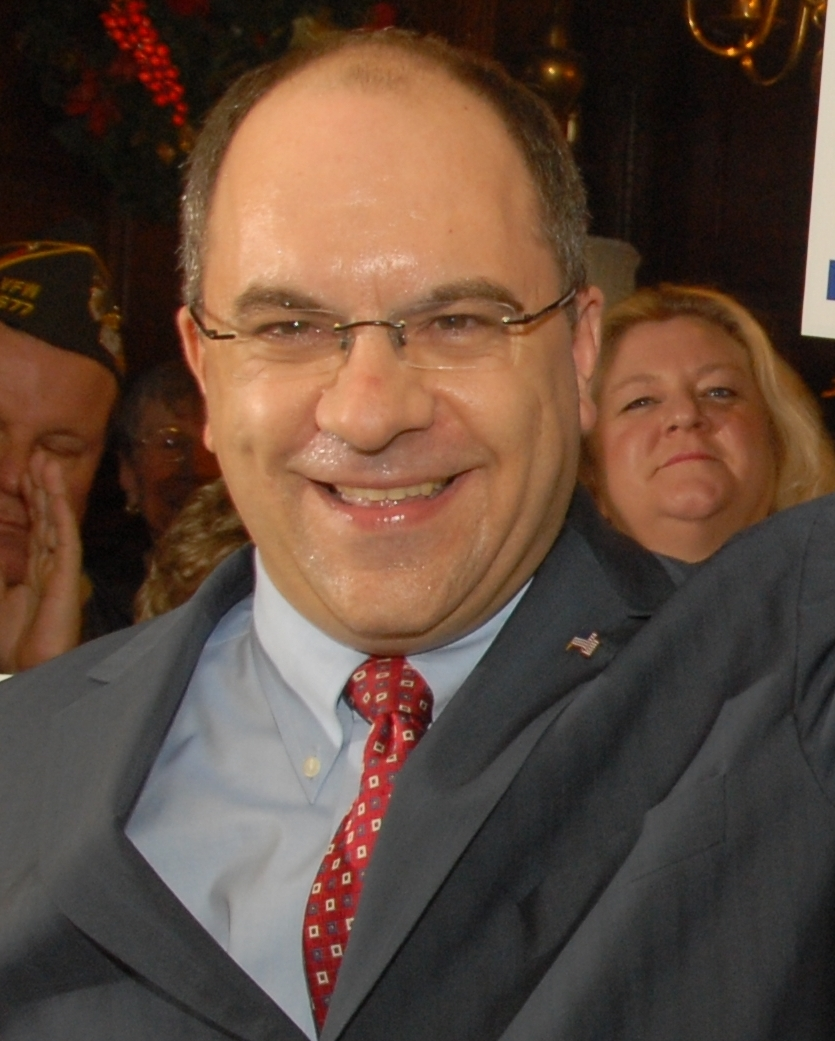
Nominee	John Adler	Chris Myers
Party	Democratic	Republican
Popular vote	166,390	153,122
Percentage	52.1%	47.9%
- County results Adler: 50–60% 60–70% Myers: 50–60%
U.S. Representative before election
Jim Saxton
Republican
Elected U.S. Representative
John Adler
Democratic

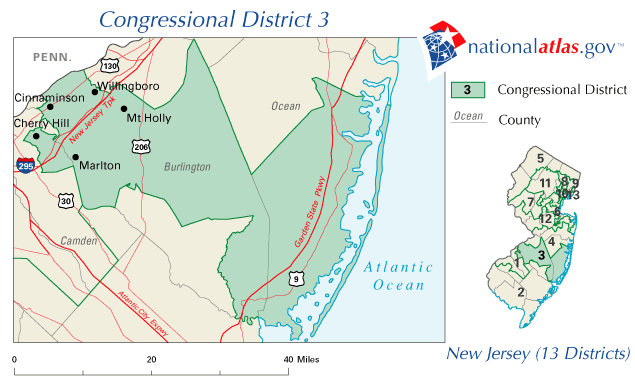

This district contains all or portions of Burlington, Camden and Ocean counties.

=== Republican primary ===
==== Candidates ====
- John P. Kelly, Ocean County Freeholder
- Justin Michael Murphy, deputy mayor of Tabernacle
- Chris Myers, mayor of Medford and vice president at Lockheed Martin

==== Withdrew ====
- Virginia E. Haines, member of the Republican National Committee, former executive director of the New Jersey Lottery, and former assemblywoman from Toms River
- Maurice Hill, member of the Toms River Township Council
- Joe Vicari, Ocean County Freeholder

===== Declined =====
- Jim Saxton, incumbent Representative from Mount Holly since 1984

==== Endorsements ====
John P. Kelly

County party organizations

- Ocean County Republican Party
Justin Michael Murphy

Individuals

- Bret Schundler, former mayor of Jersey City and nominee for governor in 2001
Chris Myers

County party organizations

- Burlington County Republican Party
- Camden County Republican Party

==== Results ====
2008 Republican U.S. House primary
Party	Candidate	Votes	%
Republican	Chris Myers	12,694	49.36%
Republican	John P. Kelly	6,531	25.39%
Republican	Justin Michael Murphy	6,494	25.25%
Total votes		25,719	100.00%

=== Democratic primary ===
==== Candidates ====
- John Adler, state senator from Cherry Hill

==== Results ====
2008 Democratic U.S. House primary
Party	Candidate	Votes	%
Democratic	John Adler	18,130	100.00%
Total votes		18,130	100.00%

=== General election ===
==== Candidates ====
- John Adler, state senator from Cherry Hill (Democratic)
- Chris Myers, mayor of Medford (Republican)

==== Campaign ====
Incumbent Republican Jim Saxton announced that he would retire at the end of his term. A mid-September internal poll by McLaughlin & Associates showed Myers defeating Adler by a margin of 33% to 29%, with a 37% plurality of voters undecided. The poll attributed Myers' lead to a general dissatisfaction among voters towards Adler's negative ads and negative mailers from various political committees supporting the Democrat. It also indicated that Adler's low approval ratings were partially due to the perception that he is a "career politician" and the fact that he is an Ivy League-educated lawyer. Adler's association with unpopular Democratic governor Jon Corzine also hurt him, while Myers was helped from his endorsement by incumbent Rep. Jim Saxton, who held a 53 percent favorable rating. However, later polls indicated that the race was too close to call.

Campaign contributions from OpenSecrets

==== Predictions ====
Source	Ranking	As of
The Cook Political Report	Tossup	November 6, 2008
Rothenberg	Tilt D (flip)	November 2, 2008
Sabato's Crystal Ball	Lean D (flip)	November 6, 2008
Real Clear Politics	Tossup	November 7, 2008
CQ Politics	Tossup	November 6, 2008

==== Results ====
2008 U.S. House election
Party	Candidate	Votes	%	±%
Democratic	John Adler	166,390	52.08%	▲11.04
Republican	Chris Myers	153,122	47.92%	▼10.48
Total votes		319,512	100.00%	
Democratic gain from Republican				

==== By county ====
County	John Adler Democratic		Chris Myers Republican		Margin		Total votes cast
County	#	%	#	%	#	%	Total votes cast
Burlington (part)	86,471	55.8%	68,602	44.2%	17,689	11.6%	155,073
Camden (part)	23,295	64.6%	12,742	35.4%	10,553	29.2%	36,037
Ocean (part)	56,624	44.1%	71,778	55.9%	-15,154	-11.8%	128,402
Totals	166,390	52.1%	153,122	47.9%	13,268	4.2%	319,512

== District 4 ==
2008 New Jersey's 4th congressional district election
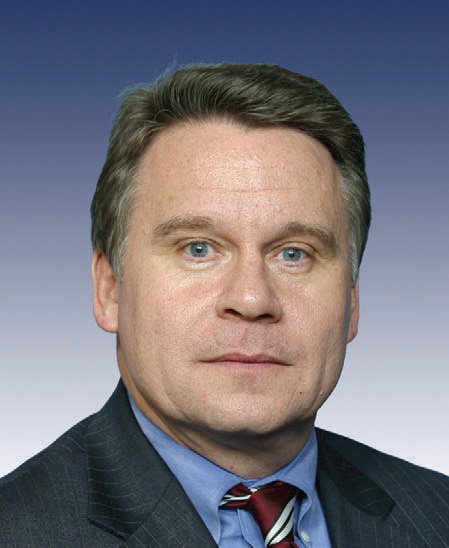

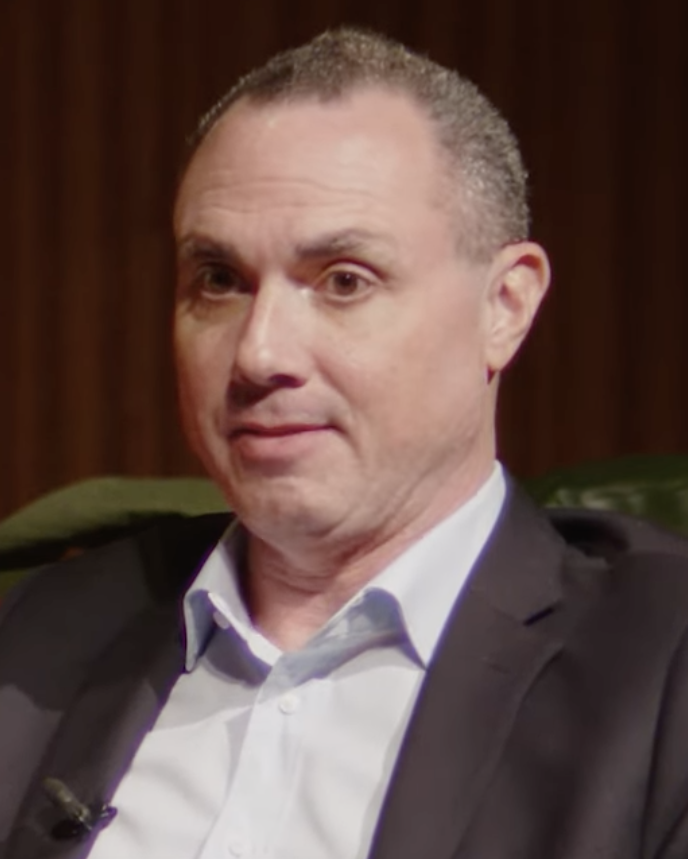
Nominee	Chris Smith	Joshua Zeitz
Party	Republican	Democratic
Popular vote	202,972	100,036
Percentage	66.2%	32.6%
- County results *: 50–60% 70–80%
U.S. Representative before election
Chris Smith
Republican
Elected U.S. Representative
Chris Smith
Republican

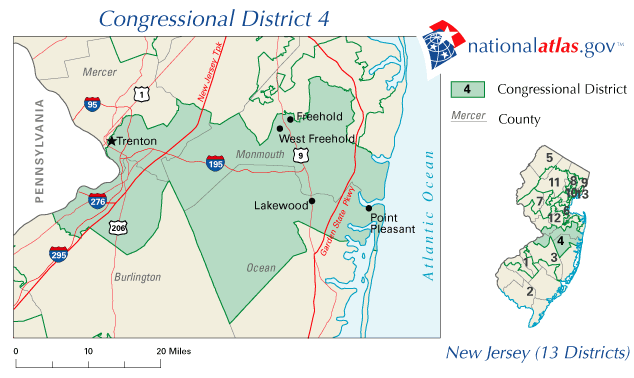

This district lies in the central part of the state, including all or portions of Burlington County, Mercer, Monmouth and Ocean counties.

=== Republican primary ===
==== Candidates ====
- Chris Smith, incumbent Representative since 1981

==== Results ====
2008 Republican U.S. House primary
Party	Candidate	Votes	%
Republican	Chris Smith (incumbent)	16,818	100.00%
Total votes		16,818	100.00%

=== Democratic primary ===
==== Candidates ====
- Joshua Zeitz, author and historian

==== Results ====
2008 Democratic U.S. House primary
Party	Candidate	Votes	%
Democratic	Joshua Zeitz	13,114	100.00%
Total votes		13,114	100.00%

=== General election ===
==== Candidates ====
- Chris Smith, incumbent Representative since 1981 (Republican)
- Steven Welzer (Green)
- Joshua Zeitz, author and historian (Democratic)

Campaign contributions from OpenSecrets

==== Predictions ====
Source	Ranking	As of
The Cook Political Report	Safe R	November 6, 2008
Rothenberg	Safe R	November 2, 2008
Sabato's Crystal Ball	Safe R	November 6, 2008
Real Clear Politics	Safe R	November 7, 2008
CQ Politics	Safe R	November 6, 2008

=== Results ===
2008 U.S. House election
Party	Candidate	Votes	%	±%
Republican	Chris Smith (incumbent)	202,972	66.21%	▲0.53
Democratic	Josh Zeitz	100,036	32.63%	▼0.56
Green	Steven Welzer	3,543	1.16%	N/A
Total votes		306,550	100.00%	

==== By county ====
County	Chris Smith Republican		Joshua Zeitz Democratic		Various candidates Other parties		Margin		Total votes cast
County	#	%	#	%	#	%	#	%	Total votes cast
Burlington (part)	19,409	55.7%	14,995	43.0%	435	1.2%	4,414	12.7%	34,839
Mercer (part)	40,766	59.9%	26,897	39.5%	438	0.6%	13,869	20.4%	68,101
Monmouth (part)	55,778	70.1%	22,239	27.9%	1,598	2.0%	33,539	42.2%	79,615
Ocean (part)	87,019	70.2%	35,905	29.0%	1,072	0.9%	51,114	41.2%	123,996
Totals	202,972	66.2%	100,036	32.6%	3,543	1.2%	102,936	33.6%	306,551

== District 5 ==
2008 New Jersey's 5th congressional district election
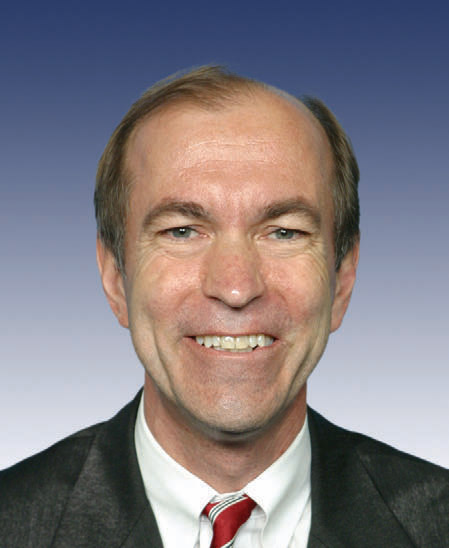

Nominee	Scott Garrett	Dennis Shulman
Party	Republican	Democratic
Popular vote	172,653	131,033
Percentage	55.9%	42.4%
- County results *: 50–60% 60–70%
U.S. Representative before election
Scott Garrett
Republican
Elected U.S. Representative
Scott Garrett
Republican

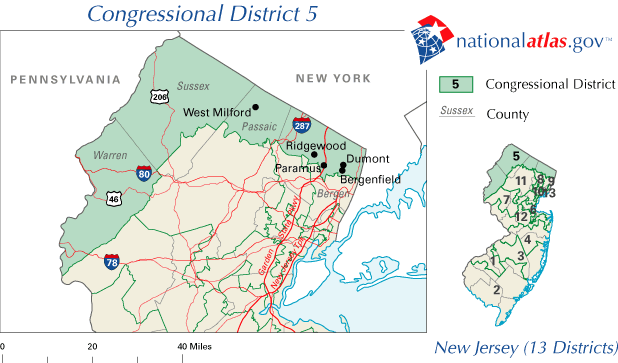

This district contains most of the Northern New Jersey Skylands Region of Sussex and Warren counties and stretches along the New York border into Northern Passaic and Bergen Counties, including the townships of Paramus and Ridgewood.

Republican incumbent Scott Garrett had been elected by safe margins in the past, but in 2006 he only won by 10 points against Paul Aronsohn, the smallest margin of his career.

=== Republican primary ===
==== Candidates ====
- Scott Garrett, incumbent Representative from Wantage since 2003

==== Results ====
2008 Republican U.S. House primary
Party	Candidate	Votes	%
Republican	Scott Garrett (incumbent)	19,914	100.00%
Total votes		19,914	100.00%

=== Democratic primary ===
==== Candidates ====
- Carmen Abate, Glen Rock lawyer and candidate for this seat in 2006
- Roger Bacon, perennial candidate
- Dennis Shulman, psychologist, public speaker, and rabbi

==== Results ====
2008 Democratic U.S. House primary
Party	Candidate	Votes	%
Democratic	Dennis Shulman	9,390	61.11%
Democratic	Camille M. Abate	4,861	31.64%
Democratic	Roger Bacon	1,114	7.25%
Total votes		15,365	100.00%

=== General election ===
==== Candidates ====
- Ed Fanning (Green)
- Scott Garrett, incumbent Representative from Wantage since 2003 (Republican)
- Dennis Shulman, psychologist, public speaker, and rabbi (Democratic)

Campaign contributions from OpenSecrets

==== Predictions ====
Source	Ranking	As of
The Cook Political Report	Likely R	November 6, 2008
Rothenberg	Safe R	November 2, 2008
Sabato's Crystal Ball	Lean R	November 6, 2008
Real Clear Politics	Safe R	November 7, 2008
CQ Politics	Likely R	November 6, 2008

==== Results ====
2008 U.S. House election
Party	Candidate	Votes	%	±%
Republican	Scott Garrett (incumbent)	172,653	55.87%	▲0.96
Democratic	Dennis Shulman	131,033	42.40%	▼1.42
Green	Ed Fanning	5,321	1.72%	N/A
Total votes		309,007	100.00%	

==== By county ====
County	Scott Garrett Republican		Dennis Shulman Democratic		Various candidates Other parties		Margin		Total votes cast
County	#	%	#	%	#	%	#	%	Total votes cast
Bergen (part)	98,048	52.3%	87,120	46.5%	2,285	1.2%	10,928	5.8%	187,453
Passaic (part)	14,439	57.4%	10,409	41.4%	303	1.2%	4,030	16.0%	25,151
Sussex (part)	32,487	64.1%	16,371	32.3%	1,785	3.5%	16,116	31.8%	50,643
Warren	27,679	60.5%	17,133	37.4%	948	2.1%	10,546	23.1%	45,760
Totals	172,653	55.9%	131,033	42.4%	5,321	1.7%	41,620	13.5%	309,007

== District 6 ==
2008 New Jersey's 6th congressional district election
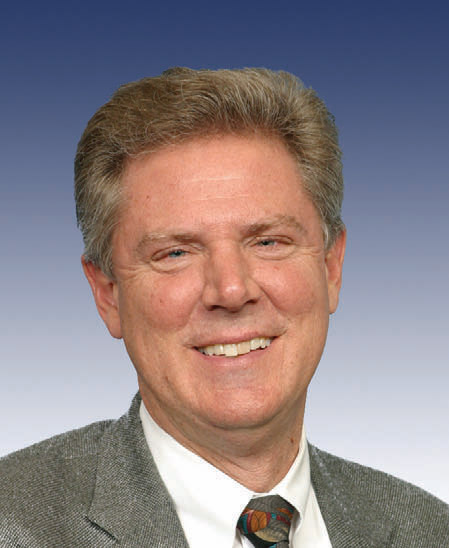

Nominee	Frank Pallone	Robert McLeod
Party	Democratic	Republican
Popular vote	164,077	77,469
Percentage	67.0%	31.6%
- County results *: 60–70% 80–90% 90–100%
U.S. Representative before election
Frank Pallone
Democratic
Elected U.S. Representative
Frank Pallone
Democratic

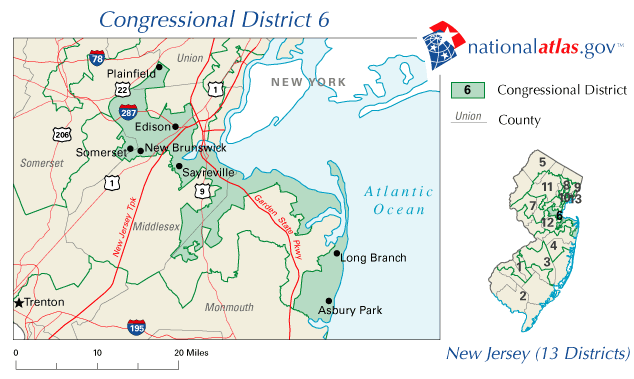

Incumbent Frank Pallone defeated Republican challenger Robert McLeod, a municipal judge. Between 2003 and 2013, this district covered parts of Middlesex, Monmouth, Somerset and Union counties.

=== Democratic primary ===
==== Candidates ====
- Frank Pallone, incumbent Representative from Long Branch since 1988

==== Results ====
2008 Democratic U.S. House primary
Party	Candidate	Votes	%
Democratic	Frank Pallone (incumbent)	18,609	100.00%
Total votes		18,609	100.00%

=== Republican primary ===
==== Candidates ====
- Peter Cerrato
- James P. Hogan
- Robert E. McLeod, municipal judge

==== Results ====
2008 Republican U.S. House primary
Party	Candidate	Votes	%
Republican	Robert E. McLeod	3,698	55.14%
Republican	Peter Cerrato	1,946	29.02%
Republican	James P. Hogan	1,062	15.84%
Total votes		6,706	100.00%

=== General election ===
==== Candidates ====
- Robert McLeod, municipal judge (Republican)
- Frank Pallone, incumbent Representative from Long Branch since 1988 (Democratic)
- Herb Tarbous, candidate for this seat in 2006 (Regular Independent)

Campaign contributions from OpenSecrets

==== Predictions ====
Source	Ranking	As of
The Cook Political Report	Safe D	November 6, 2008
Rothenberg	Safe D	November 2, 2008
Sabato's Crystal Ball	Safe D	November 6, 2008
Real Clear Politics	Safe D	November 7, 2008
CQ Politics	Safe D	November 6, 2008

==== Results ====
2008 U.S. House election
Party	Candidate	Votes	%	±%
Democratic	Frank Pallone (incumbent)	164,077	66.95%	▼1.73
Republican	Robert McLeod	77,469	31.61%	▲1.41
Independent	Herb Tarbous	3,531	1.44%	▲0.31
Total votes		245,077	100.00%	

==== By county ====
County	Frank Pallone Democratic		Robert McLeod Republican		Various candidates Other parties		Margin		Total votes cast
County	#	%	#	%	#	%	#	%	Total votes cast
Middlesex (part)	68,993	67.6%	31,396	30.8%	1,632	1.6%	37,597	36.8%	102,021
Monmouth (part)	77,527	63.0%	43,836	35.6%	1,666	1.4%	33,691	27.4%	123,029
Somerset (part)	5,435	80.9%	1,176	17.5%	107	1.6%	4,259	63.4%	6,718
Union (part)	12,122	91.1%	1,061	8.0%	126	0.9%	11,061	83.1%	13,309
Totals	164,077	66.9%	77,469	31.6%	3,531	1.4%	86,608	35.3%	245,077

== District 7 ==
2008 New Jersey's 7th congressional district election
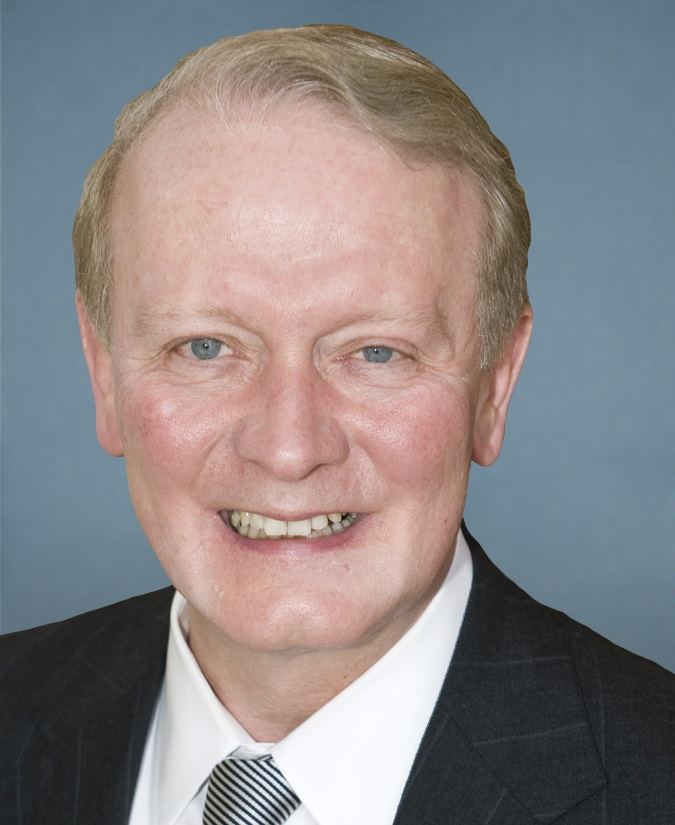

Nominee	Leonard Lance	Linda Stender	Michael Hsing
Party	Republican	Democratic	Independent Republican
Popular vote	148,461	124,818	16,419
Percentage	50.2%	42.2%	5.6%
- County results Lance: 40–50% 50–60% 60–70% Stender: 50–60%
U.S. Representative before election
Mike Ferguson
Republican
Elected U.S. Representative
Leonard Lance
Republican

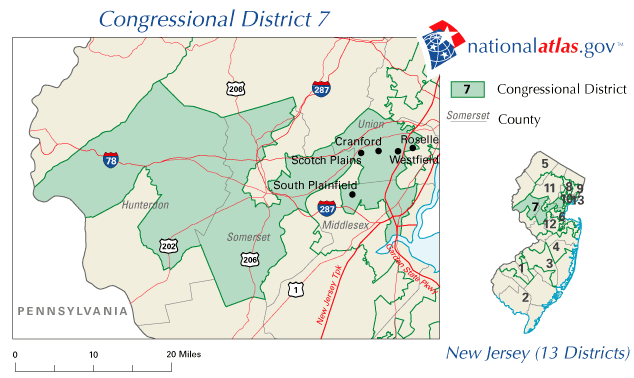

The incumbent, Republican Representative Mike Ferguson, announced on November 19, 2007, that he would not seek re-election, citing family obligations.

=== Republican primary ===
==== Candidates ====
- A.D. Amar, Seton Hall University professor
- Kate Whitman, former ice hockey player and daughter of former Governor of New Jersey Christine Todd Whitman
- P. Kelly Hatfield, former Summit council president
- Leonard Lance, State Senator from Clinton and former Senate Minority Leader (Republican)
- Martin Marks, mayor of Scotch Plains
- Thomas Roughneen, former Union and Essex assistant county prosecutor
- Darren Young, Libertarian nominee for this seat in 2006

==== Withdrew ====
- Michael P. Hsing, Bridgewater councilman (withdrew following loss at Somerset County convention; ran in general election as independent)
- Chris Venis, former deputy mayor of Hillsborough

===== Declined =====
- Jon Bramnick, Assemblyman from Westfield
- Mike Ferguson, incumbent Representative from Union since 2001

==== Results ====
2008 Republican U.S. House primary
Party	Candidate	Votes	%
Republican	Leonard Lance	10,094	39.47%
Republican	Kate Whitman	5,052	19.75%
Republican	P. Kelly Hatfield	3,902	15.26%
Republican	Martin Marks	3,211	12.55%
Republican	Tom Roughneen	1,845	7.21%
Republican	Darren Young	1,232	4.82%
Republican	A.D. Amar	241	0.94%
Total votes		25,577	100.00%

=== Democratic primary ===
==== Candidates ====
- Linda Stender, Assemblywoman from Fanwood and nominee for this seat in 2006

==== Results ====
2008 Democratic U.S. House primary
Party	Candidate	Votes	%
Democratic	Lisa Stender	15,776	100.00%
Total votes		15,776	100.00%

=== General election ===
==== Candidates ====
- Thomas D. Abrams, perennial candidate (Prosperity Not War)
- Dean Greco, Clinton schoolteacher (All-Day Breakfast Party)
- Michael P. Hsing, Bridgewater councilman (Hsing for Congress)
- Leonard Lance, State Senator and former Senate Minority Leader (Republican)
- Linda Stender, Assemblywoman from Fanwood and nominee for this seat in 2006 (Democratic)

==== Campaign ====
The district was considered to lean Republican, but the 2008 election was expected to be highly competitive, considering the closeness of the previous election.

Lance and Stender debated each other twice during the campaign. In September, they met in Scotch Plains for a debate hosted at the Jewish Community Campus of Central New Jersey. The candidates met in October in Edison for a second debate, which was televised on News 12 New Jersey.

Both major-party candidates campaigned with prominent politicians of their party in the months before the election. Lance campaigned with then U.S. President George W. Bush and former Massachusetts Governor Mitt Romney. Stender campaigned with former U.S. president Bill Clinton and U.S. House of Representatives majority leader Steny Hoyer.

==== Predictions ====
Source	Ranking	As of
The Cook Political Report	Tossup	November 6, 2008
Rothenberg	Tossup	November 2, 2008
Sabato's Crystal Ball	Lean D (flip)	November 6, 2008
Real Clear Politics	Tossup	November 7, 2008
CQ Politics	Tossup	November 6, 2008

2008 U.S. House election
Party	Candidate	Votes	%	±%
Republican	Leonard Lance	148,461	50.22%	▲0.79
Democratic	Linda Stender	124,818	42.22%	▼5.73
Independent Republican	Michael P. Hsing	16,419	5.55%	N/A
Independent	Dean Greco	3,259	1.10%	N/A
Independent	Thomas D. Abrams	2,671	0.90%	▼0.70
Total votes		295,628	100.00%	

==== By county ====
County	Leonard Lance Republican		Linda Stender Democratic		Various candidates Other parties		Margin		Total votes cast
County	#	%	#	%	#	%	#	%	Total votes cast
Hunterdon (part)	32,972	63.5%	14,500	27.9%	4,469	8.6%	18,472	35.6%	51,941
Middlesex (part)	20,704	38.2%	29,731	54.9%	3,739	6.9%	-9,027	-16.7%	54,174
Somerset (part)	43,214	51.1%	32,549	38.5%	8,812	10.4%	10,665	12.6%	84,575
Union (part)	51,571	49.1%	48,038	45.8%	5,329	5.1%	3,533	3.3%	104,938
Totals	148,461	50.2%	124,818	42.2%	22,349	7.6%	23,643	8.0%	295,628

== District 8 ==
2008 New Jersey's 8th congressional district election
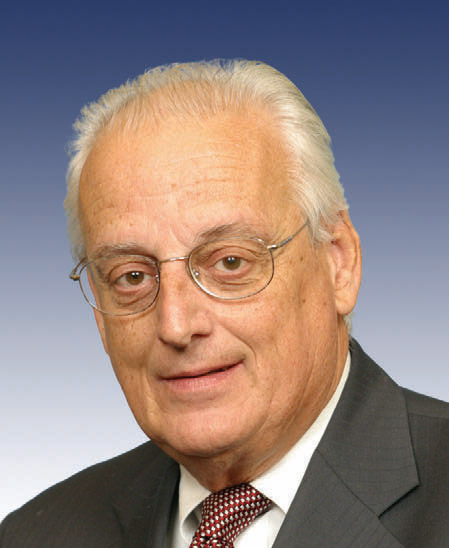

Nominee	Bill Pascrell	Roland Straten
Party	Democratic	Republican
Popular vote	159,279	63,107
Percentage	71.1%	28.2%
- County results *: 60–70% 70–80%
U.S. Representative before election
Bill Pascrell
Democratic
Elected U.S. Representative
Bill Pascrell
Democratic

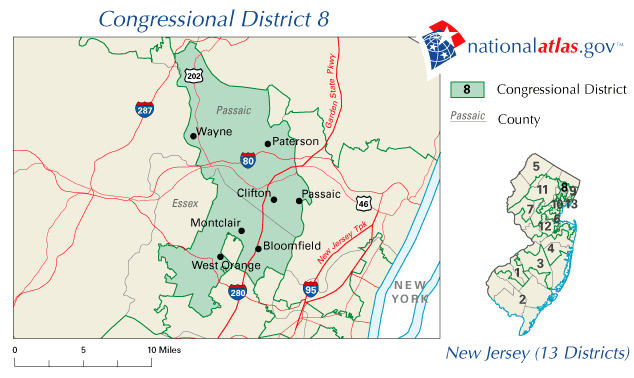

This district lies in the north-east part of the state, including portions of Essex and Passaic counties.

=== Democratic primary ===
==== Candidates ====
- Bill Pascrell, incumbent Representative from Paterson since 1997

==== Results ====
2008 Democratic U.S. House primary
Party	Candidate	Votes	%
Democratic	Bill Pascrell (incumbent)	19,948	100.00%
Total votes		19,948	100.00%

=== Republican primary ===
==== Candidates ====
- Roland Straten, engineer and U.S. Navy veteran

==== Results ====
2008 Republican U.S. House primary
Party	Candidate	Votes	%
Republican	Roland Straten	5,859	100.00%
Total votes		5,859	100.00%

=== General election ===
==== Candidates ====
- Derek DeMarco (Libertarian)
- Bill Pascrell, incumbent Representative from Paterson since 1997 (Democratic)
- Roland Straten, engineer and U.S. Navy veteran (Republican)

Campaign contributions from OpenSecrets

==== Predictions ====
Source	Ranking	As of
The Cook Political Report	Safe D	November 6, 2008
Rothenberg	Safe D	November 2, 2008
Sabato's Crystal Ball	Safe D	November 6, 2008
Real Clear Politics	Safe D	November 7, 2008
CQ Politics	Safe D	November 6, 2008

=== Results ===
2008 U.S. House election
Party	Candidate	Votes	%	±%
Democratic	Bill Pascrell (incumbent)	159,279	71.11%	▲0.22
Republican	Roland Straten	63,107	28.17%	▼0.20
Libertarian	Derek DeMarco	1,600	0.71%	▼0.03
Total votes		223,986	100.00%	

==== By county ====
County	Bill Pascrell Democratic		Roland Straten Republican		Derek DeMarco Independent		Margin		Total votes cast
County	#	%	#	%	#	%	#	%	Total votes cast
Essex (part)	63,579	68.1%	28,955	31.0%	762	0.8%	34,624	37.1%	93,296
Passaic (part)	95,700	73.2%	34,152	26.1%	838	0.6%	61,548	47.1%	130,690
Totals	159,279	71.1%	63,107	28.2%	1,600	0.7%	96,172	42.9%	223,986

== District 9 ==
2008 New Jersey's 9th congressional district election
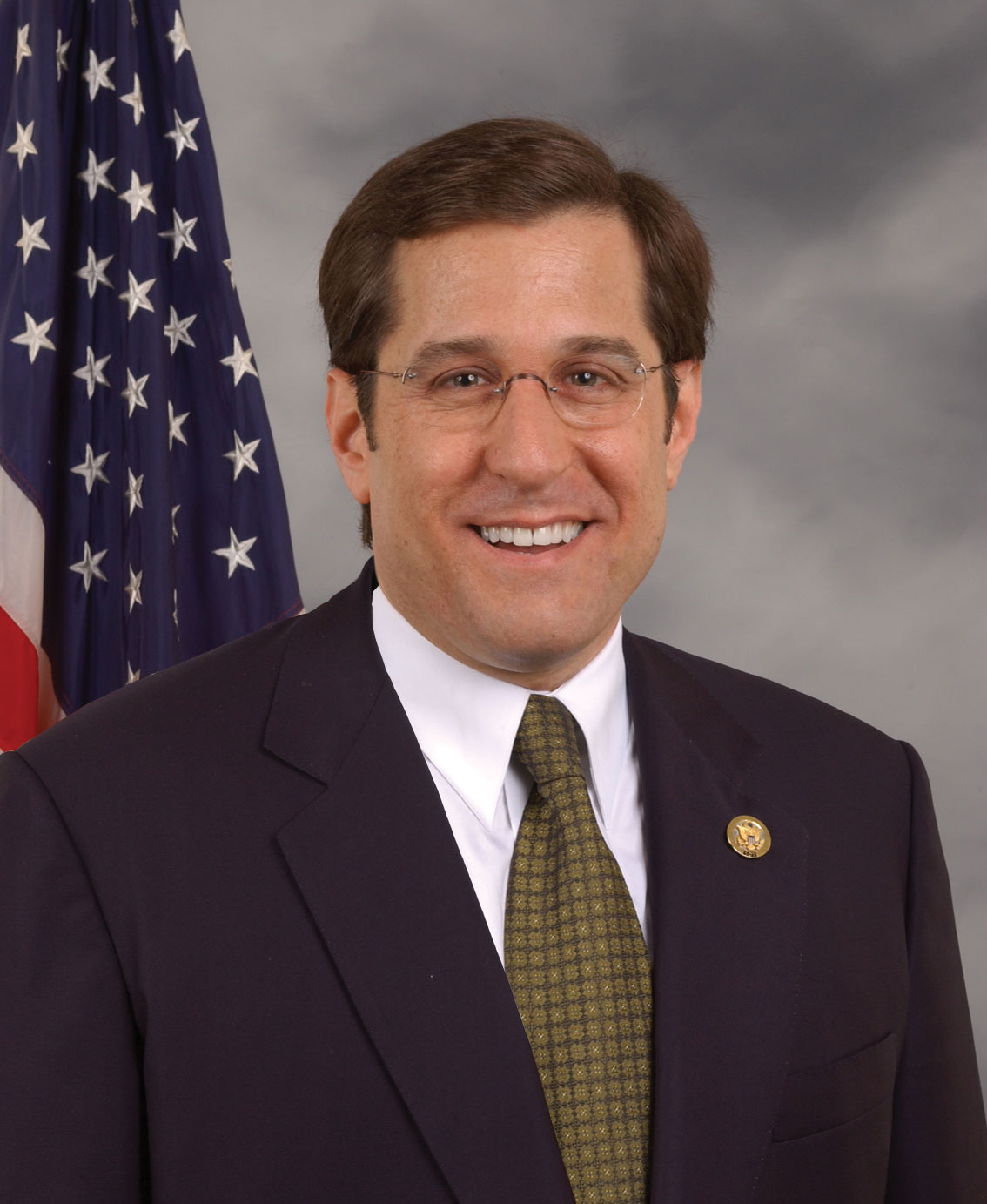

Nominee	Steve Rothman	Vincent Micco
Party	Democratic	Republican
Popular vote	151,182	69,503
Percentage	67.5%	31.0%
- County results *: 50–60% 60–70% 70–80%
U.S. Representative before election
Steve Rothman
Democratic
Elected U.S. Representative
Steve Rothman
Democratic

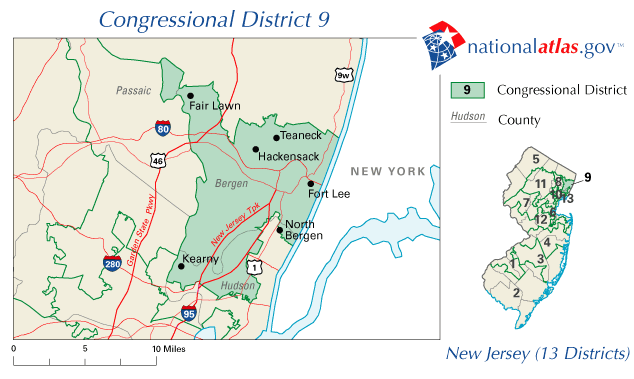

This district lies in the north-east part of the state, including all or portions of Bergen and Hudson and Passaic counties.

=== Democratic primary ===
==== Candidates ====
- Steve Rothman, incumbent Representative from Fair Lawn since 1997

==== Results ====
2008 Democratic U.S. House primary
Party	Candidate	Votes	%
Democratic	Steve Rothman (incumbent)	25,418	100.00%
Total votes		25,418	100.00%

=== Republican primary ===
==== Candidates ====
- Vincent Micco, nominee for this seat in 2006

==== Results ====
2008 Republican U.S. House primary
Party	Candidate	Votes	%
Republican	Vincent Micco	5,797	100.00%
Total votes		5,797	100.00%

=== General election ===
==== Candidates ====
- Michael Perrone Jr. (Independent/Progressive)
- Vincent Micco, nominee for this seat in 2006 (Republican)
- Steve Rothman, incumbent Representative from Fair Lawn since 1997 (Democratic)

Campaign contributions from OpenSecrets

==== Predictions ====
Source	Ranking	As of
The Cook Political Report	Safe D	November 6, 2008
Rothenberg	Safe D	November 2, 2008
Sabato's Crystal Ball	Safe D	November 6, 2008
Real Clear Politics	Safe D	November 7, 2008
CQ Politics	Safe D	November 6, 2008

==== Results ====
2008 U.S. House election
Party	Candidate	Votes	%	±%
Democratic	Steve Rothman (incumbent)	151,182	67.53%	▼3.95
Republican	Vincent Micco	69,503	31.04%	▲3.44
Independent	Michael Perrone Jr.	3,200	1.43%	N/A
Total votes		223,885	100.00%	

==== By county ====
County	Steve Rothman Democratic		Vincent Micco Republican		Michael Perrone Independent		Margin		Total votes cast
County	#	%	#	%	#	%	#	%	Total votes cast
Bergen (part)	121,846	67.3%	56,876	31.4%	2,237	1.2%	64,970	35.9%	180,959
Hudson (part)	25,149	71.9%	9,061	25.9%	749	2.1%	16,088	46.0%	34,959
Passaic (part)	4,187	52.6%	3,566	44.8%	214	2.7%	621	7.8%	7,967
Totals	151,182	67.5%	69,503	31.0%	3,200	1.4%	81,679	36.5%	223,885

== District 10 ==
2008 New Jersey's 10th congressional district election
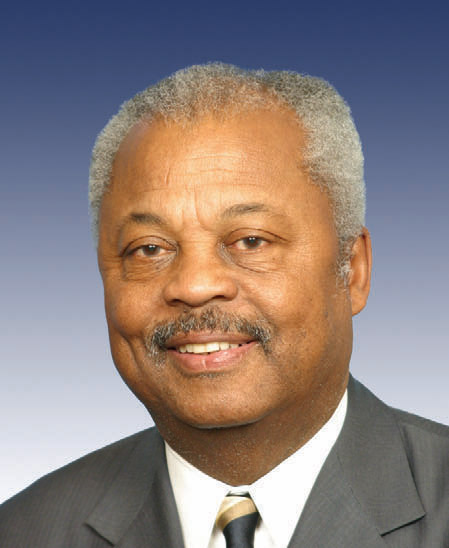

Nominee	Donald M. Payne	Michael Taber
Party	Democratic	Socialist Workers
Popular vote	169,945	1,848
Percentage	98.9%	1.1%
- County results *: 90–100%
U.S. Representative before election
Donald M. Payne
Democratic
Elected U.S. Representative
Donald M. Payne
Democratic

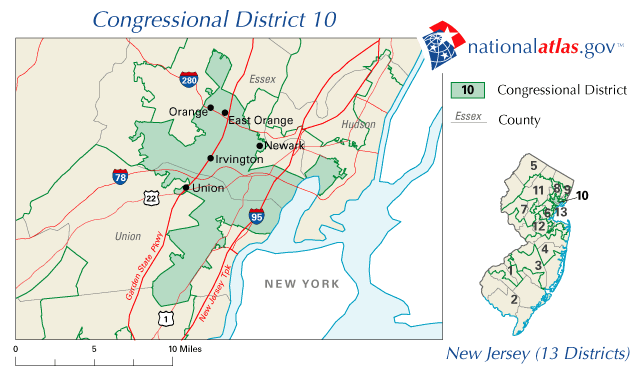

This district lies in the northeast part of the state, including all or portions of Essex, Hudson and Union counties. Republicans again failed to nominate a candidate to oppose Payne, but the Socialist Workers Party nominated Michael Taber, an editor.

=== Democratic primary ===
==== Candidates ====
- Donald M. Payne, incumbent Representative from Newark since 1989

==== Results ====
2008 Democratic U.S. House primary
Party	Candidate	Votes	%
Democratic	Donald M. Payne (incumbent)	30,764	100.00%
Total votes		30,764	100.00%

=== General election ===
==== Candidates ====
- Donald M. Payne, incumbent Representative from Newark since 1989 (Democratic)
- Michael Taber, editor (Socialist Workers)

Campaign contributions from OpenSecrets

==== Predictions ====
Source	Ranking	As of
The Cook Political Report	Safe D	November 6, 2008
Rothenberg	Safe D	November 2, 2008
Sabato's Crystal Ball	Safe D	November 6, 2008
Real Clear Politics	Safe D	November 7, 2008
CQ Politics	Safe D	November 6, 2008

=== Results ===
2008 U.S. House election
Party	Candidate	Votes	%	±%
Democratic	Donald M. Payne (incumbent)	169,945	98.92%	▼1.08
Socialist Workers	Michael Taber	1,848	1.08%	N/A
Total votes		171,893	100.00%	

==== By county ====
County	Donald Payne Jr. Democratic		Michael Taber Socialist Workers		Margin		Total votes cast
County	#	%	#	%	#	%	Total votes cast
Essex (part)	107,168	99.1%	948	0.9%	106,220	98.2%	108,116
Hudson (part)	16,259	98.3%	288	1.7%	15,971	96.6%	16,547
Union (part)	46,518	98.7%	612	1.3%	45,906	97.4%	47,130
Totals	169,945	98.9%	1,848	1.1%	168,097	97.8%	171,793

== District 11 ==
2008 New Jersey's 11th congressional district election
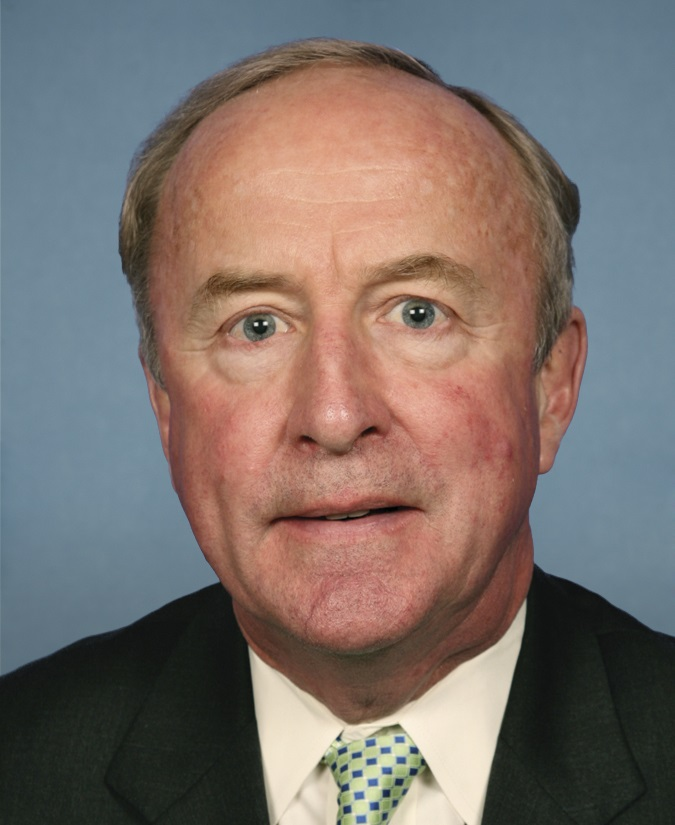

Nominee	Rodney Frelinghuysen	Tom Wyka
Party	Republican	Democratic
Popular vote	189,696	113,510
Percentage	61.8%	37.0%
- County results *: 50–60% 60–70%
U.S. Representative before election
Rodney Frelinghuysen
Republican
Elected U.S. Representative
Rodney Frelinghuysen
Republican

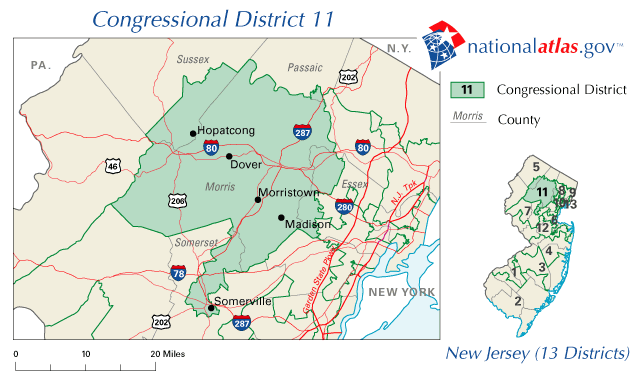

This district lies in the north-central part of the state, including all of Morris County and portions of Essex, Passaic, Somerset and Sussex counties.

=== Republican primary ===
==== Candidates ====
- Kate Erber
- Rodney Frelinghuysen, incumbent Representative from Harding since 1995

==== Results ====
2008 Republican U.S. House primary
Party	Candidate	Votes	%
Republican	Rodney Frelinghuyen (incumbent)	24,304	86.69%
Republican	Kate Erber	3,731	13.31%
Total votes		28,035	100.00%

=== Democratic primary ===
==== Candidates ====
- Ellen Greenberg
- Garry Hager
- Tom Wyka, information technology manager and nominee for this seat in 2006

==== Results ====
2008 Democratic U.S. House primary
Party	Candidate	Votes	%
Democratic	Tom Wyka	10,885	69.72%
Democratic	Ellen Greenberg	2,456	15.73%
Democratic	Gary Hager	2,271	14.55%
Total votes		15,612	100.00%

=== General election ===
==== Candidates ====
- Rodney Frelinghuysen, incumbent Representative from Harding since 1995 (Republican)
- Chandler Tedholm (For the People)
- Tom Wyka, information technology manager and nominee for this seat in 2006 (Democratic)

Campaign contributions from OpenSecrets

==== Predictions ====
Source	Ranking	As of
The Cook Political Report	Safe R	November 6, 2008
Rothenberg	Safe R	November 2, 2008
Sabato's Crystal Ball	Safe R	November 6, 2008
Real Clear Politics	Safe R	November 7, 2008
CQ Politics	Safe R	November 6, 2008

==== Results ====
2008 U.S. House election
Party	Candidate	Votes	%	±%
Republican	Rodney Frelinghuysen (incumbent)	189,696	61.84%	▼0.25
Democratic	Tom Wyka	113,510	37.01%	▲0.37
Independent	Chandler Tedholm	3,526	1.15%	N/A
Total votes		306,732	100.00%	

==== By county ====
County	Rodney Frelinghuysen Republican		Tom Wyka Democratic		Chandler Tedholm Independent		Margin		Total votes cast
County	#	%	#	%	#	%	#	%	Total votes cast
Essex (part)	19,183	61.3%	11,834	37.8%	282	0.9%	7,349	23.5%	31,299
Morris	137,518	62.0%	82,270	37.1%	2,050	0.9%	55,248	24.9%	221,838
Passaic (part)	988	57.2%	697	40.3%	43	2.5%	291	16.9%	1,728
Somerset (part)	18,478	60.7%	11,513	37.8%	440	1.4%	6,965	22.9%	30,431
Sussex (part)	13,259	63.1%	7,196	33.6%	711	3.3%	6,333	29.5%	21,436
Totals	189,696	61.8%	113,510	37.0%	3,526	1.1%	76,186	24.8%	306,732

== District 12 ==
2008 New Jersey's 12th congressional district election
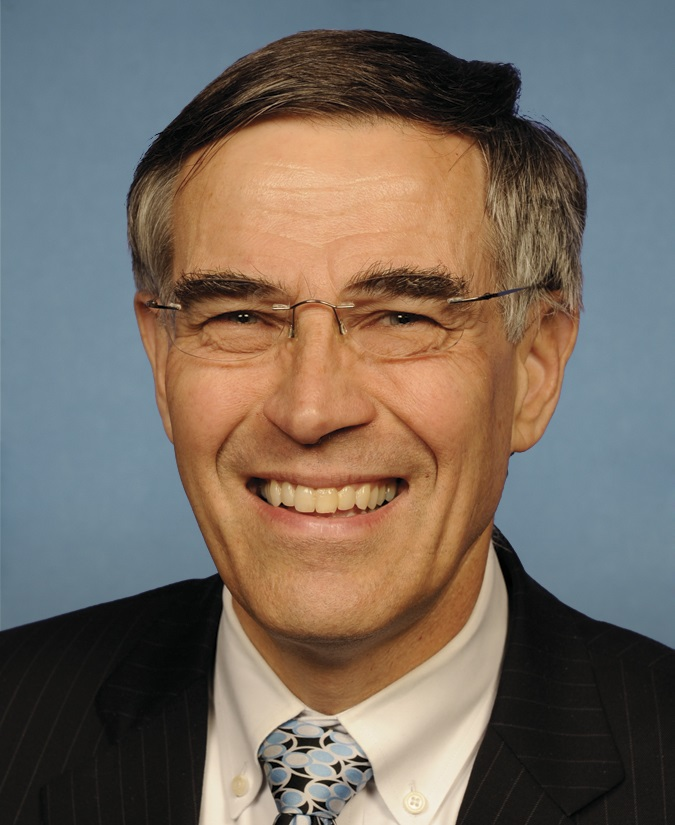

Nominee	Rush Holt Jr.	Alan Bateman
Party	Democratic	Republican
Popular vote	193,732	108,400
Percentage	63.1%	35.3%
- County results *: 50–60% 60–70% 70–80%
U.S. Representative before election
Rush Holt Jr.
Democratic
Elected U.S. Representative
Rush Holt Jr.
Democratic

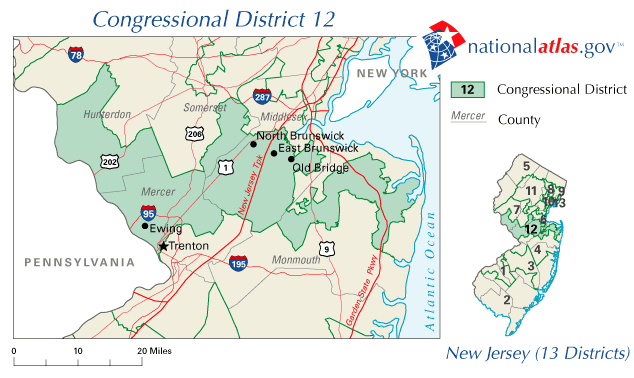

This district lies in the central part of the state, including portions of Hunterdon, Mercer, Middlesex, Monmouth and Somerset counties.

=== Democratic primary ===
==== Candidates ====
- Rush Holt Jr., incumbent Representative from Pennington since 1999

==== Results ====
2008 Democratic U.S. House primary
Party	Candidate	Votes	%
Democratic	Rush Holt Jr. (incumbent)	23,653	100.00%
Total votes		23,653	100.00%

=== Republican primary ===
==== Candidates ====
- Alan Bateman, deputy mayor of Holmdel

==== Results ====
2008 Republican U.S. House primary
Party	Candidate	Votes	%
Republican	Alan R. Bateman	9,718	100.00%
Total votes		9,718	100.00%

=== General election ===
==== Candidates ====
- Alan Bateman, deputy mayor of Holmdel (Republican)
- David Corsi Jr. (Common Sense Ideas)
- Rush Holt Jr., incumbent Representative from Pennington since 1999 (Democratic)

Campaign Contributions from OpenSecrets.org

==== Predictions ====
Source	Ranking	As of
The Cook Political Report	Safe D	November 6, 2008
Rothenberg	Safe D	November 2, 2008
Sabato's Crystal Ball	Safe D	November 6, 2008
Real Clear Politics	Safe D	November 7, 2008
CQ Politics	Safe D	November 6, 2008

==== Results ====
2008 U.S. House election
Party	Candidate	Votes	%	±%
Democratic	Rush Holt Jr. (incumbent)	193,732	63.12%	▼2.58
Republican	Alan Bateman	108,400	35.32%	▲1.02
Common Sense Ideas	David Corsi	4,802	1.56%	N/A
Total votes		306,934	100.00%	

==== By county ====
County	Rush Holt Democratic		Alan Bateman Republican		David Corsi Independent		Margin		Total votes cast
County	#	%	#	%	#	%	#	%	Total votes cast
Hunterdon (part)	7,441	54.7%	5,731	42.1%	425	3.1%	1,710	12.6%	13,597
Mercer (part)	60,645	76.6%	17,766	22.4%	738	0.9%	42,879	54.2%	79,149
Middlesex (part)	70,926	63.5%	39,110	35.0%	1,605	1.4%	31,816	28.5%	111,641
Monmouth (part)	42,296	50.5%	39,775	47.5%	1,744	2.1%	2,521	3.0%	83,815
Somerset (part)	12,424	66.3%	6,018	32.1%	290	1.5%	6,406	34.2%	18,732
Totals	193,732	63.1%	108,400	35.3%	4,802	1.6%	85,332	1.6%	306,934

== District 13 ==
2008 New Jersey's 13th congressional district election
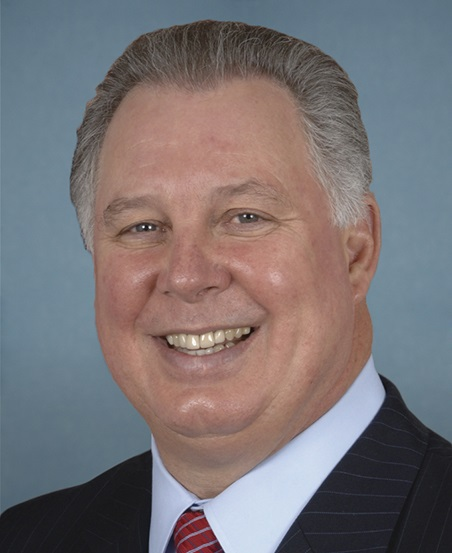

Nominee	Albio Sires	Joseph Turula
Party	Democratic	Republican
Popular vote	206,453	34,375
Percentage	75.4%	21.7%
- County results *: 70–80% 80–90%
U.S. Representative before election
Albio Sires
Democratic
Elected U.S. Representative
Albio Sires
Democratic

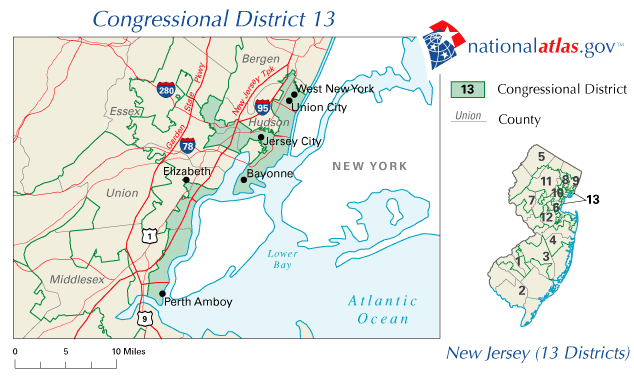

This district lies in the north-east part of the state, including portions of Essex, Hudson, Middlesex and Union counties.

=== Democratic primary ===
==== Candidates ====
- Albio Sires, incumbent Representative from West New York since 2006

==== Results ====
2008 Democratic U.S. House primary
Party	Candidate	Votes	%
Democratic	Albio Sires (incumbent)	26,527	100.00%
Total votes		26,527	100.00%

=== Republican primary ===
==== Candidates ====
- Joseph Turula, former Pompton Lakes councilman and lawyer

==== Results ====
2008 Republican U.S. House primary
Party	Candidate	Votes	%
Republican	Joseph Turula	1,739	100.00%
Total votes		1,739	100.00%

=== General election ===
==== Candidates ====
- Julio A. Fernandez (No Slogan Provided)
- Albio Sires, incumbent Representative from West New York since 2006 (Democratic)
- Joseph Turula, former Pompton Lakes councilman and lawyer (Republican)
- Louis Vernotico (Eliminate the Primary)

Campaign contributions from OpenSecrets

==== Predictions ====
Source	Ranking	As of
The Cook Political Report	Safe D	November 6, 2008
Rothenberg	Safe D	November 2, 2008
Sabato's Crystal Ball	Safe D	November 6, 2008
Real Clear Politics	Safe D	November 7, 2008
CQ Politics	Safe D	November 6, 2008

==== Results ====
2008 U.S. House election
Party	Candidate	Votes	%	±%
Democratic	Albio Sires (incumbent)	206,453	75.36%	▼2.16
Republican	Joseph Turula	34,375	21.74%	▲2.38
Independent	Julio A. Fernandez	3,661	2.29%	N/A
Independent	Louis Vernotico	975	0.61%	N/A
Total votes		159,753	100.00%	

==== By county ====
County	Albio Sires Democratic		Joseph Turula Republican		Various candidates Other parties		Margin		Total votes cast
County	#	%	#	%	#	%	#	%	Total votes cast
Essex (part)	16,254	81.9%	2,948	14.9%	647	3.2%	13,306	67.0%	19,849
Hudson (part)	82,305	74.1%	25,678	23.1%	3,105	2.8%	56,627	51.0%	111,088
Middlesex (part)	14,911	74.2%	4,512	22.4%	686	3.5%	10,399	51.8%	20,109
Union (part)	6,912	79.4%	1,597	18.3%	198	2.3%	5,315	71.1%	8,707
Totals	120,382	75.4%	34,735	21.7%	4,636	2.9%	85,647	53.7%	159,753

Preceded by 2006 elections	United States House of Representatives elections in New Jersey; 2008	Succeeded by 2010 elections
