= Chris John Myers =

Chris John Myers from the University of Utah, Salt Lake City was named Fellow of the Institute of Electrical and Electronics Engineers (IEEE) in 2013 for contributions to design and testing for asynchronous, analog, and genetic circuits.
