= Personnel Psychology (journal) =

- Discipline: Personnel psychology
- Language: English
- Edited by: Tammy D. Allen

Publication details
- History: 1948–present
- Publisher: John Wiley & Sons
- Frequency: Quarterly
- Impact factor: 6.4 (2024)

Standard abbreviations
- ISO 4: Pers. Psychol.

Indexing
- CODEN: PPSYAQ
- ISSN: 0031-5826 (print); 1744-6570 (web)
- LCCN: 50013779
- OCLC no.: 885177886

Links
- Journal homepage; Online access; Online archive

Personnel Psychology is a quarterly peer-reviewed academic journal covering personnel psychology. It was established in 1948 and is published by John Wiley & Sons. The editor-in-chief is Tammy D. Allen (University of South Florida). According to the Journal Citation Reports, the journal has a 2025 impact factor of 10.8.
