= Steve Rothman =

American politician (born 1952)

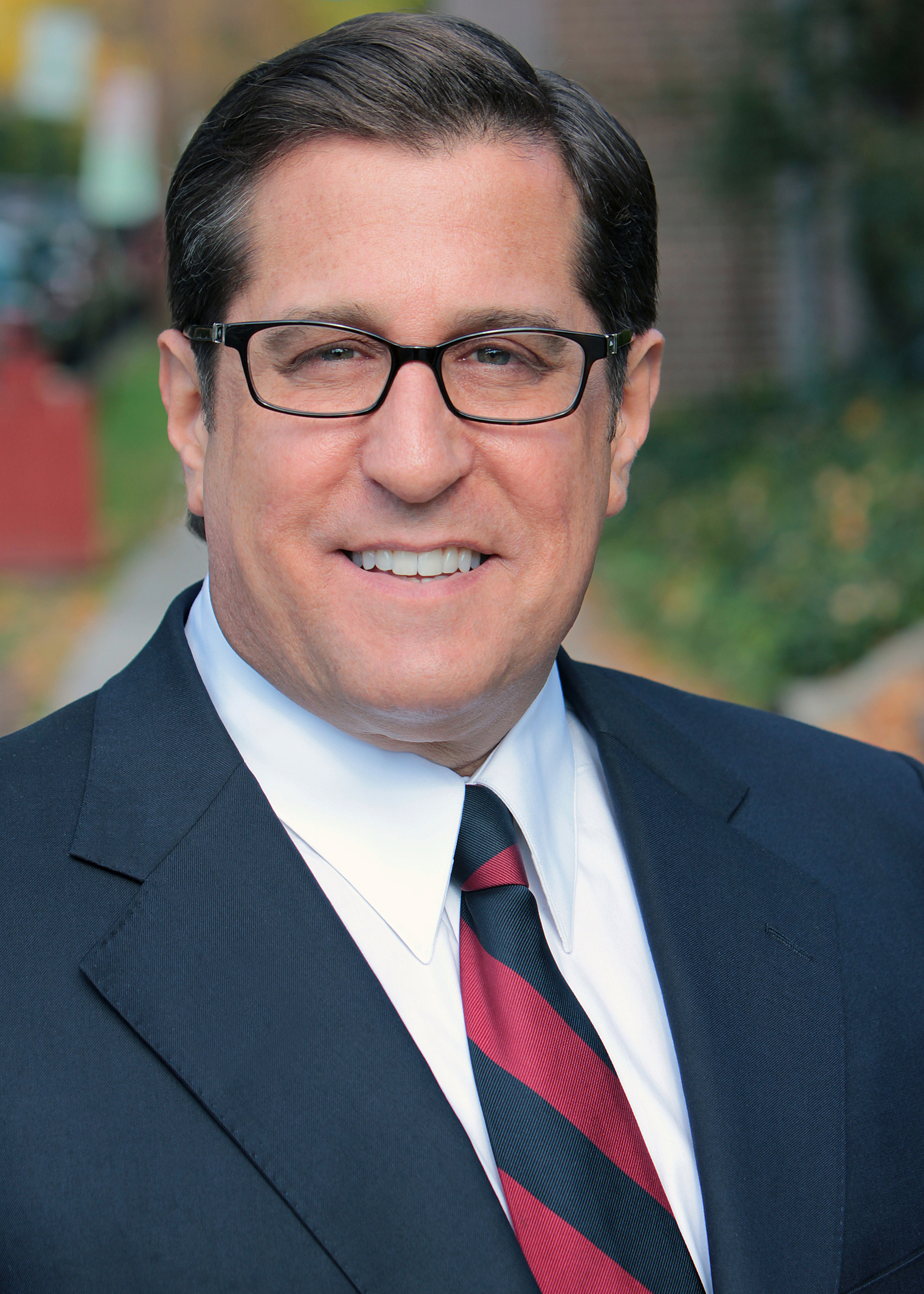

Member of the U.S. House of Representatives from New Jersey's 9th district
- In office January 3, 1997 – January 3, 2013
- Preceded by: Robert Torricelli
- Succeeded by: Bill Pascrell

Mayor of Englewood
- In office 1983–1989
- Preceded by: Sondra Greenberg
- Succeeded by: Donald Aronson

Personal details
- Born: Steven Richard Rothman; October 14, 1952 (age 73) Englewood, New Jersey, U.S.
- Party: Democratic
- Spouse: Jennifer Beckenstein (m. 2006; div. 2011)
- Children: 2
- Education: Syracuse University (BA); Washington University (JD)
- Website: Official website

Steven Richard Rothman (born October 14, 1952) is an American former jurist and Democratic politician who served as the U.S. representative for New Jersey's 9th congressional district, serving for 16 years from January 3, 1997, to January 3, 2013.

Rothman was a member of the House Appropriations Committee, and also served on the House Judiciary, Foreign Affairs, and Science and Technology Committees. Prior to his election to the U.S. Congress, Rothman also served as the elected Bergen County Surrogate Court judge, and the two-term mayor of the City of Englewood, New Jersey.

After the congressional redistricting of December 23, 2011, was announced, Rothman competed in a Democratic primary to continue to represent the redrawn NJ-9. He was defeated on June 5, 2012, in a primary election by fellow incumbent Bill Pascrell (formerly the congressman for NJ-8).

== Early life, education and pre-congressional career ==
=== Early life and education ===
Rothman was born on October 14, 1952, in Englewood, New Jersey, to Philip and Muriel Rothman; he and his twin Arthur joined an older sister Susan. Steve attended the Roosevelt Public Elementary School in Englewood until the fifth grade when the family moved to nearby Tenafly, where he completed his education in the Tenafly Public School System.

Rothman graduated in 1970 from Tenafly High School, where he was senior class president, Best School Citizen, was first clarinet, first chair in the Tenafly High School Orchestra, was a member of the Tenafly High School Madrigal Singers, played the lead in Tenafly High School's production of Twelve Angry Men, wrestled, played soccer and tennis. He was a freestyle and backstroke swimmer in a New Jersey Jewish Community Center swim league and completed his Water Safety Instructor Certificate in 1971.

In his senior year in high school, Rothman became the chair of the 18-Year-Old Vote Campaign for Tenafly, New Jersey, seeking to secure the New Jersey legislature's support for the proposed 26th Amendment to the U.S. Constitution, ensuring 18-year-old U.S. citizens the right to vote.

In 1974 he earned a B.A. degree from Syracuse University, where he majored in political philosophy. In 1972 he was selected by a student-faculty-administrator search committee to serve on the university's student supreme court (University Judicial Board) for his sophomore, junior and senior years. He was elected Chief Justice of the UJB by its members for 1973–74.

While at Syracuse, Rothman was lead singer in a folk-rock music group named "Sweet Rock."

From 1974 to 1977 Rothman attended the Washington University School of Law in St. Louis, Missouri, where he was awarded a Juris Doctor degree in 1977.

In each of his three years at law school, Rothman was a High School Law Project member, teaching a course he wrote on the "U.S. Constitution and Bill of Rights" to urban and suburban high school students in the St. Louis City and Metropolitan area. In 1975, Rothman won the "Best Oralist" Award in the Washington University School of Law Moot Court Competition. In 1976, Rothman and his partner Gerald Kline placed first among twelve teams representing six law schools at the Eighth Circuit Regional Moot Court Regional Competition in Rapid City, South Dakota, also winning "Best Brief."

Rothman was admitted to the New Jersey bar in 1977 and became a practicing New Jersey attorney. In 1982, he was admitted to practice law also in New York. In 1984 he was admitted to practice law before the U.S. Supreme Court.

=== Early career ===
Rothman started his legal career as a trial associate at the firm of Miller, Hochman, Myerson and Schaeffer in Jersey City, New Jersey, in 1977. In January 1980, he started his own firm for the general practice law in Englewood in a two-room office over a barber shop on Depot Square. In 1977, Rothman moved his residence from Tenafly to Englewood.

Rothman became active in Englewood community affairs, serving as president of the Scarborough Manor Tenants' Association, where he performed pro bono legal services for the poor and elderly faced with eviction following condominium conversion. He also was the co-founder of the Englewood Hispanic Lion's Club and a member of the United Jewish Community of Bergen County and member of the Board of Governors of the Jewish Community Center on the Palisades.

Politically, he was Campaign Coordinator for various Englewood City Council-member races as well as a member of the Englewood Democratic Club, the Englewood Democratic Municipal Committee, the Bergen County Young Democrats, and the New Jersey Young Democrats. He held the office of Treasurer for the Bergen County Democratic Party, for State Senator Matthew Feldman, as well as for various Bergen County Democratic Freeholder (county legislature) campaigns.

=== Englewood's mayor ===
In 1982, Rothman ran for and won the city's Democratic Party nomination to be Englewood's mayor. Rothman was also endorsed by the Englewood Black Clergy Council and the Englewood Patrolman's Benevolent Association (the first time those two organizations had ever endorsed the same candidate for mayor). He won the Democratic primary and the November 1982 general elections. At his January 1983 swearing in, he was 30 years old. Rothman served two terms from 1983 to 1989. He remains the youngest mayor in Englewood's history.

Rothman served two terms as Englewood's mayor, from 1983 to 1989. In 1992, he was elected as the Bergen County Surrogate Court judge and remained in this position until running for Congress in 1996.

==== Libyan government buys Englewood property ====
In December 1982, just before the start of Rothman's first mayoral term, the Libyan government bought a five-acre estate "on the hill" in Englewood. There was widespread community concern that Col. Mohmmar Kaddafi, an internationally acknowledged terrorist and the dictator of Libya, a country with which the U.S. did not have diplomatic relations at the time, would take up part-time residence at the Englewood mansion and thus precipitate violent conflict in Englewood between his supporters and opponents.

Just days before Rothman was to be sworn in as the new mayor, one of Englewood's former mayors, The Reverend Walter Taylor, who was also the minister of the Galilee United Methodist Church in Englewood and the president of the Englewood Black Clergy Council, held a press conference at the United Nations Press Club and denounced "self-styled Zionists" who were seeking to keep Libyans out of Englewood. Taylor described this as a "question of Jewish influence." The next night, at the January 1983 Mayor and Council Reorganization Meeting, the other leaders of the Englewood Black Clergy Council denounced Taylor, and the Englewood Black Clergy Council appeared at the meeting to publicly disassociate themselves from Taylor's comments.

After he was sworn in, Rothman went to Washington, D.C., to lobby the Reagan State Department to use the newly enacted "Foreign Missions Act" to restrict the use of the estate to the Libyan ambassador to the United Nations and his family. In June 1983, the Foreign Missions Office of the State Department announced its decision to implement the "Act" by limiting use of the property to strictly residential and recreational purposes for the Ambassador and his immediate family. It forbade any other use of the estate by the Libyan government.

In the summer of 2009, in advance of the U.N. General Assembly Meeting, it was discovered that Kaddafi was significantly renovating the Englewood mansion and grounds to be used as one of his homes. Rothman, at that time the U.S. congressman for the 9th congressional district of New Jersey, which included Englewood, worked with the Obama State Department to continue the 1983 conditions for the Libyan government's use of the Englewood estate. Renovations ceased and Kaddafi never set foot on the Englewood property.

==== Other mayoral initiatives ====
In 1984, Rothman led the effort to save the regional Community Mental Health Organization (CMHO), a state and county-funded agency located in Englewood that served 180,000 people, disproportionately Englewood residents, in the area. He organized a successful fundraising effort by eleven Bergen County mayors after they had been notified that state and county support was being threatened by a $200,000 shortfall in CMHO accounting. Rothman helped the CMHO achieve sustained state and county support and promoted a change of private managers, making it part of another county mental health agency while it remained in the same Englewood building.

May 19, 1985, Rothman was sworn in as the new president of the Bergen County Democratic Mayors Association.

Rothman announced in 1988 that he would not seek a third term so that he could devote more time to family and his private law practice.

=== Personal ===
Rothman and his first wife had two children, John and Karen. His subsequent marriage also ended in divorce. Rothman now resides in Englewood, New Jersey.

=== Post-mayoral activities ===
Rothman continued his general practice of law in Englewood, expanding his offices and staff.

In 1989, Rothman ran unsuccessfully as one of three Democratic candidates to fill three openings on the Bergen County Board of Chosen Freeholders (the county legislature). Bergen County was the largest county in New Jersey with 850,00 people. Rothman lost the election by less than 2,000 votes.

In 1989, Rothman was appointed Chairman of the Jewish Community Relations Council of Northern New Jersey (JCRC). In 1991, Rothman hosted 500 Christians, Jews, Muslims, Bahais and Sikhs for the 5th Annual Brotherhood/Sisterhood Interfaith Breakfast, sponsored by the JCRC.

In 1990 and 1991, Rothman served as Treasurer of the respective Bergen County Democratic Party Freeholder races.

In 1990 and 1991, Rothman was also active in local affairs, joining the Wyckoff Democratic Municipal Committee and serving as its chairman. During that time, he also served as Campaign Manager for Jack Van Horne for Wyckoff Township Council. He and his wife were also members of "Wyckoff Partners In Pride," a community beautification committee of volunteers.

=== Bergen County Surrogate Court judge ===
In 1992, Rothman ran for and was chosen by the Bergen County Democratic Party to be their candidate for the elected position of Bergen County Surrogate Court Judge. Under New Jersey law, each of the state's twenty-one counties, including Bergen County (its most populous) is required to elect a Judge of the Surrogate's Court who is responsible, among other duties, for the probating and administering of the estates of all that county's residents. Rothman won the general election in November 1992, becoming the first attorney to serve in that position in the 148 years the position had been an elected one.

During Rothman's administration, he provided the Bergen County Surrogate's Office with uniformly modern computers, which enabled a 55% increase in cases processed while reducing the number of employees by 10% through attrition. He facilitated improved access to the public by adding office phone lines and making the public documents on file in the Surrogate's Court more available by computerizing indexes and expanding availability. As Surrogate, among other personnel changes, his first hire there was a Hispanic college graduate, the first Hispanic or Spanish-speaking member of the Bergen County Surrogate's Court in history.

In March 1995, Rothman wrote and had published an 18-page booklet entitled "The Three Legal Documents Recommended For Every Bergen County Adult," which dealt with the operations of the Bergen County Surrogate's Court, probate, self-proving wills, living wills, and durable powers of attorney. Approximately 23,000 booklets were published and distributed, in English and Spanish. Rothman conducted more than 100 seminars on wills, living wills, probate and powers of attorney, speaking directly to over 10, 000 Bergen County residents.

Rothman also invested over $75 million in assets for minors who received settlements or judgments in Bergen County. During his three years in office, his federally-insured investments realized the highest rate of return of any surrogate in the state.

== U.S. House of Representatives ==
=== Elections ===
In a district that was 90 percent non-Jewish, with no Jewish House members then representing New Jersey, Rothman was elected the first Jewish-American House member in the history of the 9th congressional district.

He was reelected to that seat seven more times.

In 1996, incumbent Democratic U.S. Representative Robert G. Torricelli of New Jersey's 9th congressional district decided to run for the United States Senate that was being vacated by Bill Bradley, creating a vacancy in the House seat. Rothman was encouraged by Democratic leaders and laypeople to run for the seat. However, the New Jersey Supreme Court required him to step down from his position as the judge of the Bergen County Surrogate's Court in order to be a candidate. Thus, in January 1996, he resigned as Bergen County Surrogate to run for the 9th congressional district House seat. In June 1996, Rothman prevailed in the Democratic Party primary to be their candidate in the general election for Congress.

- 1996: In the general election, Rothman defeated Republican County Clerk and Chairperson of the Port Authority of New York and New Jersey, Kathleen Donovan, 56.6%–42.2%, with two independent candidates taking up the remainder of the vote.
- 1998: Rothman won reelection to a second term, defeating Mayor Steve Lonegan of Bogota, New Jersey 64.6%–33.8%, with three independent candidates receiving less than 2% of the vote.
- 2000: won reelection to a third term, defeating Joseph Tedeschi 68%–30% with two Independent candidates receiving 2% of the vote.
- 2002: won reelection to a fourth term, defeating Joseph Glass, 70%–30%.
- 2004: won reelection to a fifth term, defeating Edward Trawinski 67–32%, with the Libertarian candidate receiving 1% of the vote.
- 2006: won reelection to a sixth term, defeating Vincent Micco 71%–28%, with the Moderate Choice candidate receiving 1% of the vote.
- 2008: won reelection to a seventh term, defeating Vincent Micco 68–31% with the Independent/Progressive candidate garnering 1%.
- 2010: won reelection to an eighth term, defeating Michael A. Agosta 61%–38%, with the Green Party candidate receiving 1%.

==== 2012 primary ====
On December 23, 2011, the New Jersey Congressional Redistricting Committee, in compliance with the outcome of the 2010 U.S. census and the requirements of federal law, consolidated New Jersey's then 13 House seats into 12 congressional districts.

The half Democrat and half Republican commission named Republican John Farmer Jr. as its ‘tie-breaker. Farmer had previously held the roles of Chief Counsel and New Jersey Attorney General under Republican Governor Christine Todd Whitman.

On 23 December 2012, the commission chose a map advocated by Republican members, which combined New Jersey's 8th and 9th congressional districts, represented by William Pascrell and Steve Rothman respectively. It also created a new 5th congressional district.

At the time of the creation of this new map, Rothman held a 12-year tenure on the House Appropriations committee and Pascrell had a six-year tenure on the House Ways and Means Committee.

The Republican Plan chosen by the Redistricting Commission removed seven of the largest Democratic vote-producing municipalities from the 9th congressional district. It also moved the major Passaic County cities and towns into the 9th congressional district.

The incumbent congressman in the 8th district, lifelong Passaic County resident Congressman Bill Pascrell, the former mayor of Paterson and New Jersey State assemblyman from Passaic County, announced that he would run in the Democratic primary for the redrawn 9th congressional district. Rep. Pascrell had represented the 8th congressional district since 1997.

The incumbent congressman in the 9th district, lifelong Bergen County resident Congressman Steve Rothman, the former mayor of Englewood and elected Bergen County Surrogate Court judge, announced that he would run in the Democratic primary for re-election in the 9th congressional district. Rep. Rothman had represented the 9th congressional district since 1997.

Rothman was defeated by Pascrell in the 2012 Democratic primary. Rothman lost even though the merged district was more his district than Pascrell's; he retained 53 percent of his former territory while Pascrell retained 43 percent of his.

=== Electoral history ===
New Jersey's 9th congressional district: Results 1996–2010
Year	Democrat	Votes	Pct	Republican	Votes	Pct	3rd Party	Party	Votes	Pct	3rd Party	Party	Votes	Pct	
1996	Steve Rothman	117,646	55.8%	Kathleen Donovan	89,005	42.2%	Arthur Rosen	Independent	2,730	1.3%	Leon Myerson	Independent	1,549	0.7%	
1998	Steve Rothman	91,330	64.6%	Steve Lonegan	47,817	33.8%	Michael Perrone	Independent	1,349	1.0%	Michael Koontz	Independent	686	0.5%	*
2000	Steve Rothman	140,462	68%	Joseph Tedeschi	61,984	30%	Lewis Pell	Independent	2,273	1%	Michael Perrone	Independent	1,072	1%	*
2002	Steve Rothman	97,108	70%	Joseph Glass	42,088	30%									
2004	Steve Rothman	146,038	68%	Edward Trawinski	68,564	32%	David Daly	Libertarian	1,649	1%					
2006	Steve Rothman	105,853	71%	Vincent Micco	40,879	28%	Michael Jarvis	The Moderate Choice	1,363	1%					
2008	Steve Rothman	151,182	68%	Vincent Micco	69,503	31%	Michael Perrone	Independent/Progressive	3,200	1%					
2010	Steve Rothman	83,564	61%	Michael A. Agosta	52,082	38%	Patricia Alessandrini	Green	1,980	1%					

*Write-in and minor candidate notes: In 1998, Kenneth Ebel received 277 votes. In 2000, Robert Corriston received 980 votes.

=== Committee assignments ===
Judiciary Committee (1997–2001)

House Judiciary Subcommittee on Crime (1997–2001)

- Participated in the Impeachment Hearings of President William Jefferson Clinton, including cross-examining Independent Counsel to the House of Representatives former Judge Kenneth W. Starr (1998)
- House Foreign Affairs Committee (1997–2001)
- Subcommittee on International Economic Policy & Trade (1997–2001)
- Subcommittee on The Western Hemisphere (2001–2003)
- House Appropriations Committee (2001–2013)
- Subcommittee on Foreign Operations and State: the 11-member panel that, among other duties, recommended all Foreign Aid from the U.S., as well as recommended the U.S. State Department's budget (2001–2013)
- Subcommittee on Defense (the 13-member panel that recommended all the military spending for the U.S.) (2007–2013)
- Subcommittee on Homeland Security (2009–2011)
- Subcommittee on Agriculture (2007–2009)
- Subcommittee on Transportation, Treasury, HUD, The Judiciary, District of Columbia and Independent Agencies (2003–2007)
- Subcommittee on Treasury, Postal Service and General Government (2001–2003)
- House Science and Technology Committee (2007–2011)
- Subcommittee on Space & Aeronautics (2007–2011)
- Subcommittee on Investigations and Oversight (2007–2011)

During his time in Congress, Rothman traveled to, among other places, Iraq, Afghanistan, Pakistan, Kuwait, Egypt, Turkey, Israel, the West Bank and other locations to visit with U.S. troops, their commanders, foreign heads of state, as well as U.S. and foreign diplomatic, military and intelligence leaders.

=== Caucus memberships ===
- House Armenian Caucus
- House Congressional Arts Caucus
- House India Caucus
- House Korea Caucus
- House Kurdish Caucus
- House Lesbian, Gay, Bisexual and Transgender (LGBT) Caucus
- House Missing and Exploited Children Caucus
- House U.S.-Israel Security Cooperation Caucus
- House U.S.-Philippines Friendship Congressional Caucus

== Congressional tenure (1997–2013) ==
=== Constitutional Amendment to limit campaign contributions and expenditures ===
On March 18, 1997, Rothman became one of 15 co-sponsors of H.J.Res 17 (105th Congress), a bill to amend the U.S. Constitution to allow Congress and each state "to set reasonable limits on campaign donations and expenditures made in support of or in opposition to candidates for Federal office."

=== Clinton impeachment ===
Rothman voted for Censure and against Articles of Impeachment. Rothman argued that while the President's conduct was "irresponsible and reprehensible," it did not rise to the level of an impeachable offense under the U.S. Constitution ("treason, bribery or other high crime and misdemeanor").

=== Hackensack Meadowlands ===
As a U.S. congressman, Rothman played a key role in preserving the Hackensack Meadowlands, successfully securing millions of dollars in federal funding for the protection, remediation and study of the area. He lobbied against the Mills Mall project which had been proposed in 1996 and had caused a "decade long fight" from local environmental and lobby groups. In 2003, the Mills Corporation agreed to relocate the mall to the Continental Arena in East Rutherford, and the state began to purchase land to create the "Meadowlands Preserve" and rezone the area as undevelopable. From 2001 to 2007, Rothman secured $10 million in federal funds, plus additional state and local matching funds, to buy land to create an 8,400 acre ecological preserve in the Hackensack Meadowlands.

=== Teterboro airport ===
In 2002, Rothman worked with the Port Authority to ban "Stage 1" aircraft from Teterboro airport, and against Boeing Company, which had been working since 1996 to allow 737 jets into the airport. Boeing filed an F.A.A complaint, and the agency proposed a policy change requiring airports to provide evidence of the potential damages that occasional heavier planes would cause. The port authority and Rothman both criticised the proposed exceptions, and in 2003 Rothman authored a measure to stop the Federal Aviation Administration (FAA) from lifting the 100,000-pound weight limit at Teterboro Airport, which was approved by the U.S. House of Representatives and the Senate and signed into law by President George W. Bush.

=== Secure Our Schools Act ===
Rothman authored "The Secure Our Schools Act," (2000) which provided hundreds of millions of federal matching funds to communities across his district and across the country so that schools could attempt to keep weapons and strangers out of schools. Under the Act, towns can apply for funds to be used for school security assessments, security training of personnel and students, and for improved coordination with law enforcement officials as well as to install metal detectors, locks, and improved lighting.

=== Pro-Israel support ===
Having served as a member of both the House Appropriations Subcommittee on Defense and the House Appropriations Subcommittee on Foreign Operations, Rothman advocated the importance of the U.S. Israel relationship, stating that the national security of the United States is directly affected by the national security of the State of Israel.

In 2010, Rothman worked with his congressional colleagues and the White House to obtain funding for Israel's Iron Dome defensive missile system and David's Sling, Arrow 2 and Arrow 3. The Iron Dome system was purchased by the US military in 2019 and Arrow 3 was successfully tested by the US and Israel in Alaska in July of that year.

=== Troubled Asset Relief Program (TARP) ===
On October 3, 2008, Rothman voted against the Troubled Asset Relief Program (TARP), saying that while the Bush administration was asking for $700 billion in relief for giant financial institutions, it had refused Rothman's and other members' requests that those institutions be required to allow the modification of principal and interest obligations to underwater mortgage-holding homeowners that would prevent them from being foreclosed upon and losing their homes. He also criticized the bill for failing to make the regulatory changes to make the banks no longer "too big to fail."

=== Obama campaign 2007–2008 ===
In July 2007, Rothman became the highest-ranking Democrat in New Jersey to support then U.S. Senator Barack Obama for U.S. president. In 2013, in a Record article describing his twenty-five-year career in public office, Rothman noted that he believed "history will remember Obama not only for his deliberate and smart accomplishments as President, but for the permanent and positive effects the mere fact of his presidency has had on the psyche and character of America."

=== Mary Ann Collura Post Office Building ===
On March 11, 2004, Congressman Rothman introduced H.R. 3939 "To re-designate the facility of the United States Postal Service located at 14–24 Abbott Road in Fair Lawn, New Jersey, as the "Mary Ann Collura Post Office Building". Rothman's bill was passed by the House and Senate; and then it was signed by President George W. Bush on June 25, 2004. Collura, an 18-year veteran of the Fair Lawn Police Department, and the Borough's first female officer, was killed in the line of duty on April 4, 2003, in Fair Lawn. She was 43 years old at the time of her death. The renaming ceremony took place on November 1, 2003, in Fair Lawn, New Jersey.

=== Staff Sergeant Frank T. Carvill and Lance Corporal Michael A. Schwarz Post Office Building ===
On April 22, 2010, in response to a request by their families and local officials, Rothman sponsored H. R. 5133 "To designate the facility of the United States Postal Service located at 331 1st Street in Carlstadt, New Jersey, as the "Staff Sergeant Frank T. Carvill and Lance Corporal Michael A. Schwarz Post Office Building". Rothman's bill was passed by the House and Senate; and then it was signed by President Barack Obama on January 4, 2011. Army National Guard Staff Sergeant Carvill was killed by an improvised explosive device in Baghdad, Iraq on June 4, 2004. He was 51 years old at the time of his death. Marine Lance Corporal Schwartz was killed by a sniper in Anbar province, Iraq on May 21, 2007. He was 20 years old at the time of his death. The renaming ceremony took place on April 27, 2011, in Carlstadt, New Jersey.

=== Malachy McAllister ===
From 2003 until the end of his congressional career in 2013, Rothman was involved in preventing the deportation of Malachy McAllister and his family from the United States, including intervention with the U.S. Department of Homeland Security, and proposing House legislation on McAllister's behalf.

In the 1980s, McAllister was convicted by a court in Northern Ireland of conspiring to murder a Royal Ulster Constabulary Officer. He served more than three years in a Northern Ireland prison and was released for time served by the British. Later, in 1988, masked gunmen sprayed his home in Northern Ireland with bullets as he, his wife and then four children were inside.

McAllister and his family then fled, first to Canada and then to the U.S., arriving in Rutherford, New Jersey in 1996, where he began working as a carpenter when U.S. Authorities sought to deport him and his family.

McAllister alleged that he was a political prisoner in Northern Ireland, that he had served his full prison time, had lived and worked in the U.S. without incident and that any deportation to Northern Ireland would put his and his family's lives in severe danger.

=== Affordable Care Act town halls ===
During the national debate on the Affordable Health Care Act, Rothman held 10 town hall meetings on that subject during August 2009.

=== War in Iraq ===
On October 10, 2002, Rothman voted to authorize the use of U.S. military force against Iraq necessary to defend the national security of the U.S. against threats by Iraq and to enforce all relevant U.N. Security Council resolutions regarding Iraq, and he explained why: "now, especially in the light and shadow of September 11, there is a new immediacy and power to Saddam Hussein's longstanding and oft-stated threats against America. For years, Saddam Hussein has been a well-known patron and financier of some of the world's most lethal anti-American terrorist and terrorist organizations. Now, al Qaeda has joined him....The thought of Saddam Hussein sending these same al-Qaeda 'martyrs' to America to spray chemical or biological poisons over America's reservoirs in our most populated cities, is a thought so horrifying, yet so real a possibility, that I cannot in good conscience especially after the surprise attack of Sept. 22, permit this to happen."

On December 7, 2005, Rothman signed on as a co-sponsor of Rep. Jack Murtha's bill calling for the redeployment of all U.S. troops from Iraq. The bill stated, in part, that U.S. forces have become the target of the insurgency, 45 percent of the Iraqi people feel that the attacks on U.S. forces are justified, and recent polls in Iraq show that 80% of the Iraqi people want the U.S. forces out of their country.

On February 22, 2006, at a press conference, as well as in an op-ed published in The Record newspaper the next day, Rothman became the first member of New Jersey's congressional delegation to publicly call for a withdrawal of all U.S. troops from Iraq.

On August 23, 2006, Rothman and Congressman Rush Holt led a public forum on the war in Iraq, in Edgewater, New Jersey, at the Edgewater Community Center, entitled "If Not Now, When?" The event was sponsored by Bergen Grassroots and Hudson Democracy for America.

For eight days in mid-February 2007, Rothman traveled to Iraq, Afghanistan, Pakistan, Turkey and Kuwait as one of 15 members of the House Defense Appropriations Subcommittee. There he met with foreign diplomats, intelligence officers, chief commanders and dozens of troops. In The Record article of February 28, 2007, entitled "Rothman: Get Troops Home In Six Months", Rothman said his visit to the war-torn region confirmed his belief that U.S. troops should leave Iraq within the next six months. Rothman was also quoted as saying "The United States should be involved as advisors to the military in Iraq and we should be playing a very robust diplomatic role instead of remaining in combat."

=== Advocating for other legislative priorities ===
Rothman was also an advocate for tax reform and comprehensive immigration reform, reasonable gun control laws, gender and marriage equality, a woman's right to choose, clean air and water, smart land and energy use and conservation, and the humane treatment of animals.

== See also ==
- List of Jewish members of the United States Congress

U.S. House of Representatives
Preceded by Robert Torricelli	Member of the U.S. House of Representatives from New Jersey's 9th congressional district 1997–2013	Succeeded by Bill Pascrell
U.S. order of precedence (ceremonial)
Preceded by Glenn English as Former U.S. Representative	Order of precedence of the United States as Former U.S. Representative	Succeeded by Rush Holt Jr. as Former U.S. Representative
