= New Jersey Policy Research Organization =

American policy research foundation

New Jersey Policy Research Organization (NJPRO) is a policy research foundation located in Trenton, New Jersey. As a leading research organization for the state, the NJPRO Foundation conducts innovative, timely and practical research on issues of importance to New Jersey employers. Working with diverse interests, NJPRO sponsors and supports research in New Jersey through both public and private policy research institutes, universities, colleges and individuals.

== History ==
Founded in 1995 by Joe Gonzalez, NJPRO was created to work as the research arm of the New Jersey Business & Industry Association (NJBIA). The Foundation was to conduct innovative, timely and practical research on issues of importance to New Jersey employers. Governed by an independent Board of Trustees, NJPRO became a nonpartisan, tax-exempt organization that has depended on the support of corporations, individuals and other foundations for its income. It has not accepted government funding. NJPRO has helped the business community shape public policy in Trenton and has been committed to the highest standards of scholarly research.

== Vision ==
The New Jersey Policy Research Organization articulates the importance of industry and challenges “anti-business” legislation. Through factual research and policy analysis, the Foundation hopes to shed light on business and industry, the economic drivers of this great State. With credibility and influence, NJPRO has the opportunity to take a proactive approach on public policy in impact areas such as economic development, taxation, workplace regulations, workforce development and other business issues.

== Research Projects ==
NJPRO produces a variety of research which impacts New Jersey policy. NJPRO has produced: • Facts For Discussion • In-Depth Research Papers • Annual consortiums of New Jersey Business Faculty publications • Industry Spotlights and Special Reports • State Stats • Small Business Curriculum
