= Chris Myers (New Jersey politician) =

American business executive and politician (born 1965)

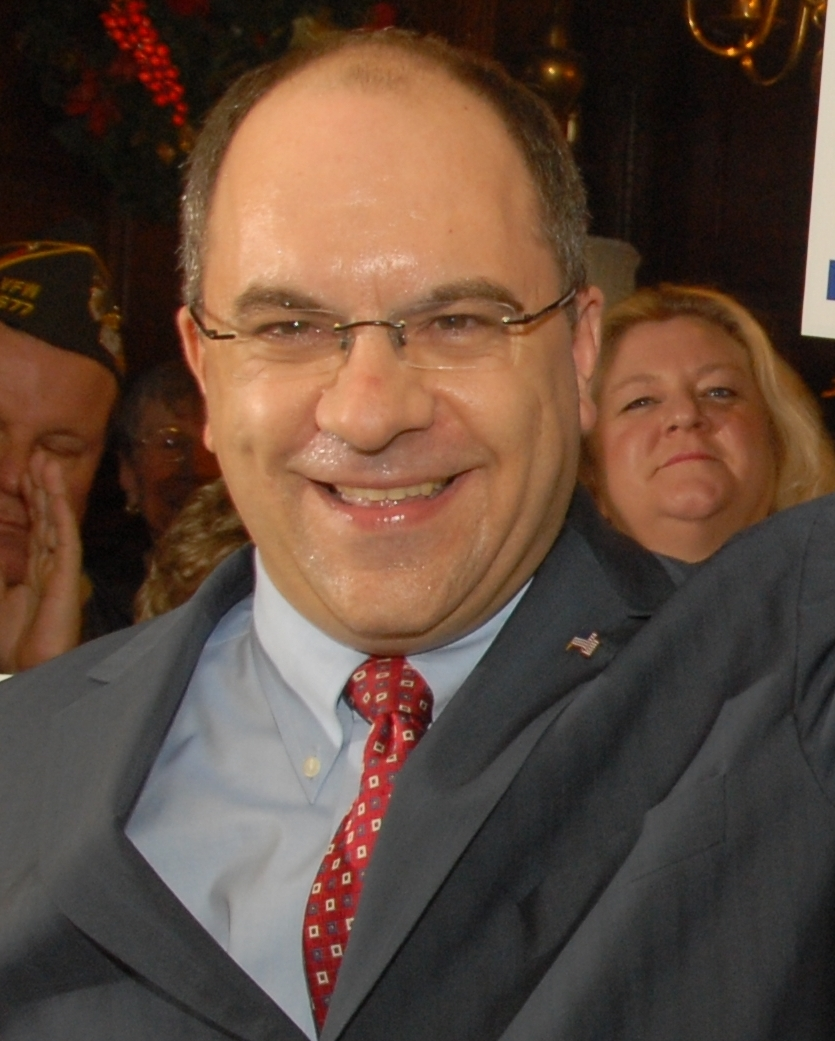

Councilman of Medford, New Jersey

Personal details
- Born: December 2, 1965 (age 60)
- Party: Republican
- Spouse: Tiffany Myers
- Children: Two
- Education: University of Colorado Boulder (bachelor's degree); Cornell University (master's degree)
- Occupation: Global Reasource Advisors LLC
- Profession: U.S. Navy/Vice President of Lockheed Martin

Chris Myers (born December 2, 1965) is an American business executive and politician, ex-Mayor in Medford, New Jersey. He was the unsuccessful Republican nominee for New Jersey's 3rd congressional district, a seat which was open due to the retirement of incumbent Jim Saxton, in 2008.

== Biography ==
Myers was raised in Medford Township in southern New Jersey, where he attended public schools and graduated from Shawnee High School. He graduated from the University of Colorado Boulder with a bachelor's degree in political science and subsequently earned a master's degree in public administration from Cornell University.

== Military experience ==
Myers, a decorated combat veteran of the Persian Gulf War, served as the Combat Information Center (CIC) officer, anti-air warfare officer, and operations officer on the Navy's first forward deployed Aegis-equipped cruiser, USS Bunker Hill. In this position, Chris directed the actions of four aircraft carriers and hundreds of land and sea-based aircraft, as well as missile ships from U.S. and allied nations. After leaving USS Bunker Hill, he served as the joint air defense officer for the combined U.S. and NATO Staff of Commander, Second Fleet and Commander Striking Fleet Atlantic aboard the flagship USS Mount Whitney. In this capacity, Myers designed and coordinated Air Defense and Tomahawk plans for exercise and real world operations. His military decorations include: a Meritorious Service Medal, Joint Service Commendation Medal, Joint Service Achievement Medal, Navy Commendation Medal (with Combat V), several Navy Achievement Medals, Combat Action Ribbon and Liberation of Kuwait Medal.

== Professional career ==
Upon leaving the Navy, Myers joined Lockheed Martin and became a program manager in the Ballistic Missile Defense (BMD) Program Office at NE&SS-Surface Systems. He led the High Range Resolution Program, which consisted of a series of radar enhancements and at-sea tests to support Navy BMD efforts. He was promoted to "Director, Missile Defense and Radar Programs," overseeing Lockheed Martin's radar business and role in BMD domestically and internationally.

Ultimately, he was promoted to "Vice President, Business Development." In this capacity, he is responsible for new business acquisition, technology research and development for MS2. Myers has also been "Vice President, Advanced Programs," and "Vice President, Sea-based Missile Defense."

Myers was released from his duties at Lockheed Martin after a sex scandal with a gay prostitute was uncovered, and is currently spearheading the solar energy projects with his company Global Resource Advisors LLC.

== Political career ==
Myers was elected to a four-year term on the Medford Township Council in 2001, and he was re-elected in 2005. After each election, the Township Council selects a mayor and deputy mayor from its members. Myers was selected as mayor in 2003, 2008. and 2011. As councilman and mayor, Myers' chief goals have been stabilization of property taxes and preservation of open space. Myers won re-election in November 2009, along with fellow council members Joe Lynn and Dave Brown.

=== Positions on issues ===
Myers calls himself a "Jim Saxton Republican", "a conservative on taxes and spending, a supporter of the environment and a friend of working men and women."

Myers is a vocal opponent of the Affordable Housing Mandate bill in New Jersey. Myers opposes the bill as a result of its inclusion of a section that creates government imposition of fees on non-residential development in order to build an affordable housing fund. He argues that this concept will be bad for taxpayers and will also destroy the preservation of environmental open space

Myers is pro-life.

Myers supports expanding child health coverage through State Children's Health Insurance Program (SCHIP). He had been an outspoken critic against President George W. Bush's veto of the expansion of SCHIP in 2008.

== 2008 Congressional campaign ==
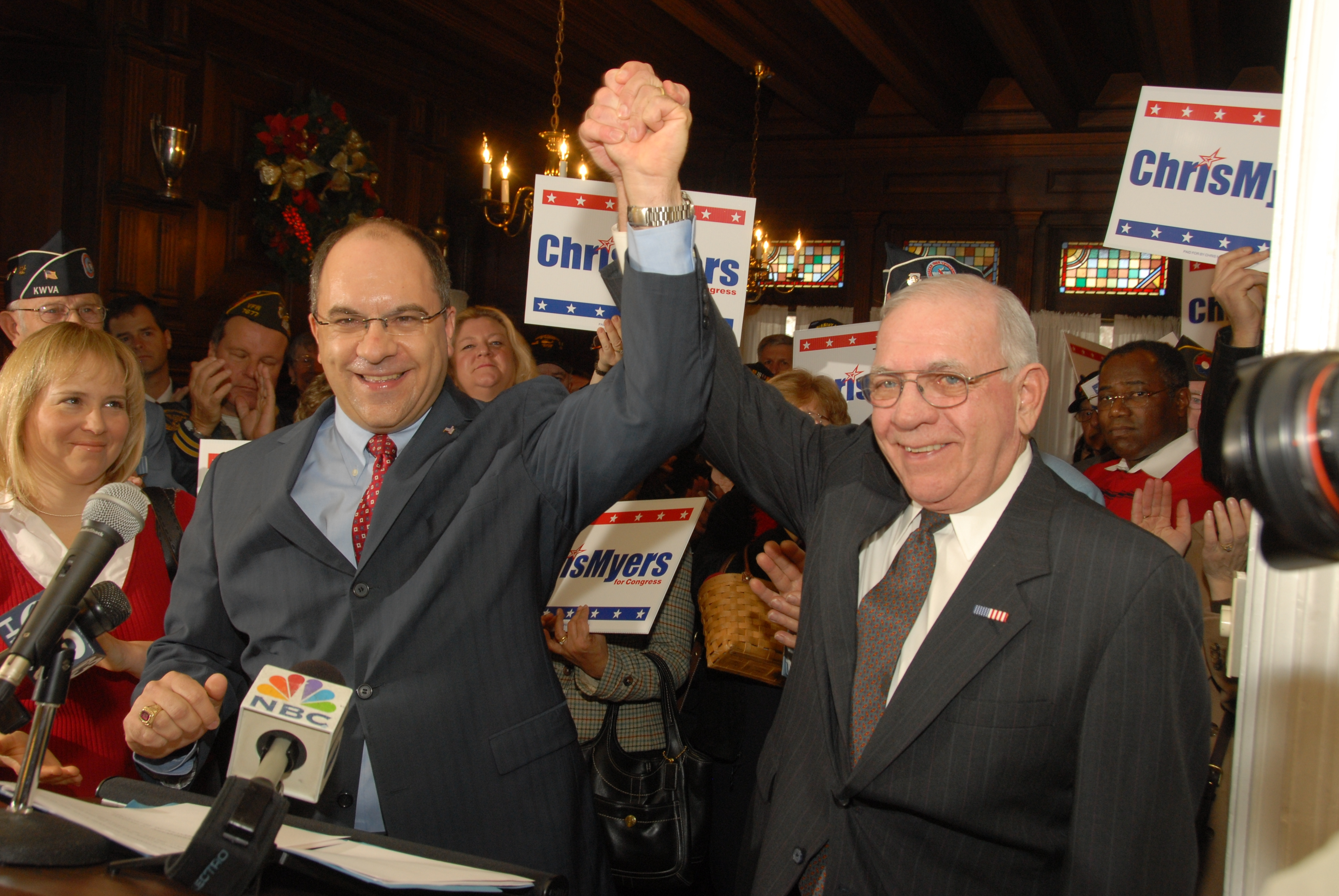
Myers (left) with former Congressman Jim Saxton (right)

Myers announced his bid for Congress in January 2008, receiving the endorsement and support of the retiring incumbent Jim Saxton.

=== Primary ===
Other candidates for the Republican nomination included Ocean County Freeholder John P. Kelly and former Tabernacle Township Committeeman Justin Murphy. The campaign in the Republican primary included disputes over taxes. Myers criticized Kelly for having voted to raise Ocean County's spending and taxes. Kelly responded that Myers's attack was hypocritical in light of the 50% increase in Medford's spending during Myers's term on the township's committee. Kelly also charged that Myers's lobbying for the defense industry created a conflict of interest.

Myers won the primary with 49% of the vote to Kelly's 26% and Murphy's 25%.

Kelly endorsed Myers after the primary, offering his "full support" and any help he could give.

=== General election ===
Myers' Democratic opponent was State Senator John Adler, who ran unopposed for his party's nomination. The only independent candidate in the race was Edward Forchion, who ran under the "Legalize Marijuana (G.R.I.P.)" Party slogan. Much of Myers' campaign focused on painting himself as a Washington and Trenton outsider and portraying his opponent as a career Trenton politician who favors higher taxes and more government spending.

On July 2, Myers announced he would be taking a leave of absence from his job as a vice president at Lockheed Martin to focus on the remainder of his Congressional campaign.

After being endorsed in January 2008 by the 3rd congressional district's retiring Congressman, Jim Saxton, several organizations also gave him their support, including Vets for Freedom, National Vietnam and Gulf War Veterans Coalition, Veterans for Victory, the National Federation of Independent Business, the NRA Political Victory Fund (receiving a grade of A−), Wake Up America, and Free and Strong America PAC.

Most newspapers favored Adler over Myers. The Press of Atlantic City, The Philadelphia Inquirer, the Courier-Post, The Burlington County Times, and The New York Times all gave their endorsement to Adler, often citing his economic policies as their reason for endorsing him. Myers did, however, receive the endorsement of the Asbury Park Press on the basis that he is an outsider and not a career politician

Myers faced a 10–1 funding gap against Adler, having spent a majority of his early warchest on an expensive primary battle against Kelly and Murphy.

== Election results ==
On November 4, 2008, after polls closed, the 3rd district race was the last one to be called in New Jersey. With 100% of precincts reporting, Myers lost narrowly to Adler, with 48.4% to his 51.6%.

== Sex scandal ==
On October 22, 2011, an extra-marital affair was reported on a website about an encounter in a California hotel with Myers. Myers vehemently denied the accusation. Shortly afterwards, he was placed on administrative leave from Lockheed Martin.

However, in an interview with The Courier-Post Thursday Oct. 27, 2011, he said that he would not resign as Medford's mayor, but he did not deny the allegations made on an anonymous website that he had paid for gay sex while visiting California the previous October. When asked by The Courier-Post if he was "gay or bisexual", Myers replied "I'm not commenting on my personal life."

On December 5, Myers submitted his resignation from the Medford Township council.
