= Forget-Me-Now =

2005 episode of "Arrested Development"

- Arrested Development episode
- The family (from left to right; Michael, Lindsay, Lucille, George Sr., and Gob) surprises Michael with a party.
- Episode no.: Season 3 Episode 3
- Directed by: John Amodeo
- Written by: Tom Saunders
- Production code: 3AJD03
- Original air date: October 3, 2005
- Running time: 22 minutes

Guest appearances
- Charlize Theron as Rita; Justin Grant Wade as Steve Holt; Bob Einstein as Larry; Scott Baio as Bob Loblaw

Episode chronology
← Previous "For British Eyes Only"	Next → "Notapusy"
- Arrested Development season 3

"Forget-Me-Now" is the third episode of the third season of the American television satirical sitcom Arrested Development. It was written by executive producer Tom Saunders and directed by supervising producer John Amodeo. The episode originally aired on the Fox Network in the United States on October 3, 2005.

Arrested Development, narrated by Ron Howard, follows the Bluths, a formerly wealthy, dysfunctional family, who made their money from property development. In the episode, the family's new attorney Bob Loblaw (Scott Baio) works on George Sr.'s (Jeffrey Tambor) defense as he plans to escape his home confinement. Michael (Jason Bateman) attempts to destroy all evidence of his family's existence so that he will not have to introduce them to Rita (Charlize Theron). However, Gob (Will Arnett), after a mishap involving Rita, makes use of his "Forget-Me-Now" pills. Concurrently, Steve Holt (Justin Grant Wade), informed by George Michael (Michael Cera) that his girlfriend Maeby (Alia Shawkat) is actually his cousin, intends to break up with her.

The episode contains the first appearance of Bob Loblaw, a character created to replace Henry Winkler's character Barry Zuckerkorn. Bob Loblaw's name originated from co-executive producer Chuck Tatham, who recalled a chain of similarly named supermarkets from his youth. "Forget-Me-Now" received positive reviews from critics, with praise going toward its humor and content. It has been featured on several lists highlighting the finest episodes of Arrested Development. Since airing, the episode has received thematic analysis from scholars and critics.

== Plot ==
The once-wealthy Bluth family consult their new attorney, Bob Loblaw, over their business, the Bluth Company, and its criminal charges for illegal property development. Patriarch George Sr., under house arrest, sends Larry (Bob Einstein), a surrogate, in his place, wired to transmit video to him. The Bluths' youngest, Maeby, has begun dating jock Steve Holt to avoid her feelings for her cousin, George Michael, whose father Michael meets up with his girlfriend Rita. She wishes to meet his family, but he lies, saying that he does not have one. The family's matriarch Lucille (Jessica Walter) arrives at the office to go on a date with George Sr., who formulates a plan to escape his confinement after seeing balloons elevating a person on TV. Michael, thinking his home will be empty, decides to bring Rita over. He eventually finds his brother-in-law Tobias (David Cross) and brother Buster (Tony Hale) in the house, surrounded by the evidence files he previously told his brother Gob to shred.

George Michael, jealous of Steve and Maeby's relationship, reveals to Steve that Maeby is his cousin. The family tries to help Michael by picking up Rita, but she is confused when meeting them and still assumes Michael has no family. Buster unintentionally knocks Rita out, and when she wakes up Gob drugs her with a rohypnol pill—which he calls a "Forget-Me-Now"—and the family dumps her onto the side of the road. Michael leaves to pick up Rita, and Steve arrives at the house, planning to end his relationship with Maeby. While waiting, Michael finds a drowsy Rita on a bench. At the house, the family greets Michael, presenting him with a quickly thrown-together party.

Rita suddenly enters, and, seeing that Michael lied and has a family, she leaves. Gob blurts out that he drugged her and unsuccessfully tries to force-feed Michael a "Forget-Me-Now". An overwhelmed Buster flings his new army medal off the balcony, popping the balloon bundle that George Sr. is using to float down to the ground. George Sr. falls and is swiftly caught by waiting police officers. George Michael finds Maeby and a pantless Steve, and reveals that Steve is her cousin. The fire from the pressure of the balloon popping destroys the evidence that Michael had hidden in his nearby car. As Michael tries to reassemble the files, he makes up with a remorseful Gob.

== Production ==
"Forget-Me-Now" was directed by supervising producer John Amodeo and written by co-executive producer Tom Saunders. It was Saunders's first and only writing credit for the series, and was the third episode of the season to be filmed, under the production code 3AJD03.

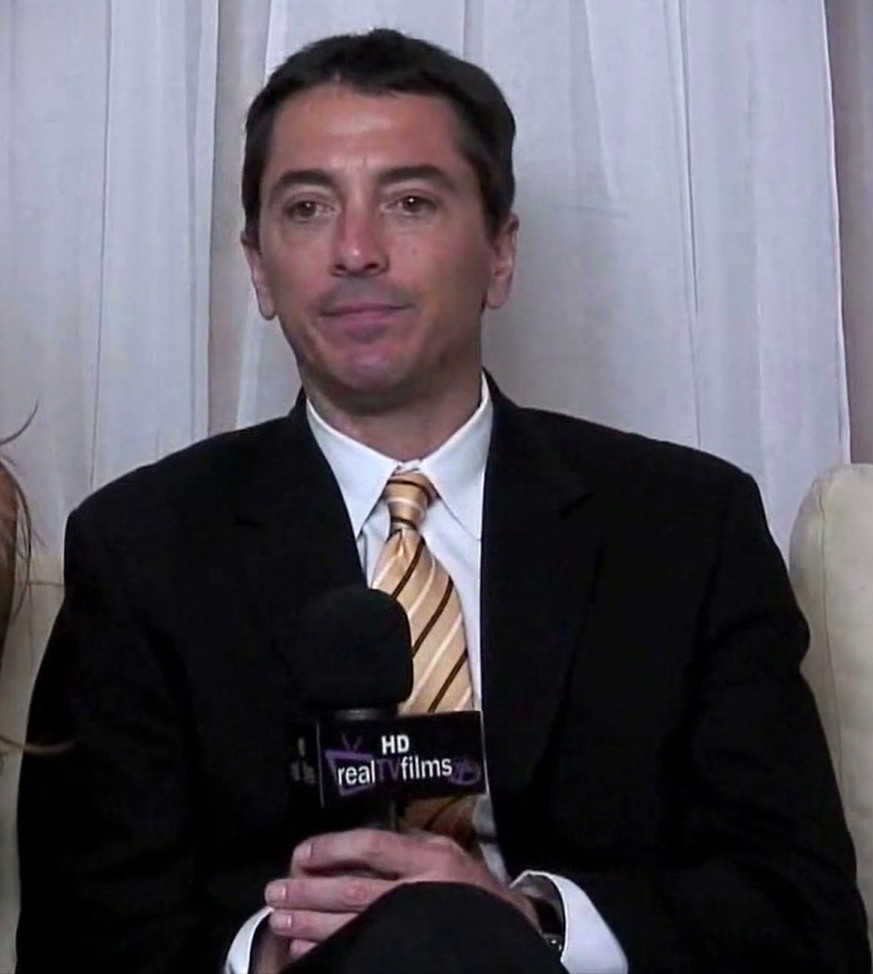
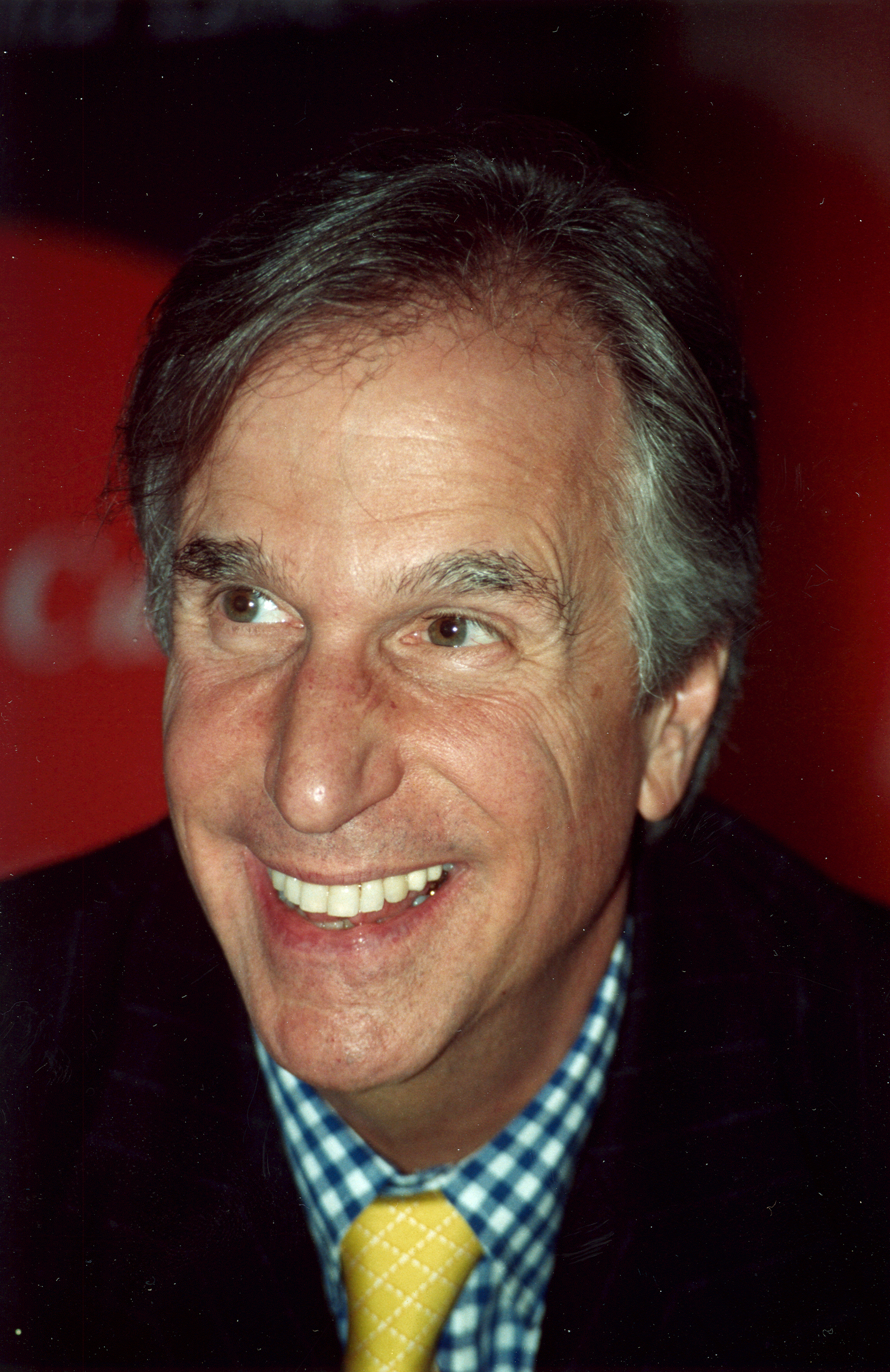
Scott Baio (left) was brought on as Bob Loblaw in Arrested Development in order to replace Henry Winkler's (right) character Barry Zuckerkorn.

The episode contains the first appearance of Scott Baio's character on the series, lawyer Bob Loblaw. He was created as a way to replace Barry Zuckerkorn, portrayed by Henry Winkler, who had left Arrested Development at this point. This mirrors what happened behind the scenes of the earlier sitcom Happy Days, where Baio was brought on to replace Winkler. Baio's agent asked if he wanted to appear on the series; he enjoyed the script and agreed. Baio told Entertainment Weekly that when series producers approached him to appear on Arrested Development, he suggested that his character could be first introduced randomly in Lucille's bedroom, or be tied up in her closet. Winkler would return as Barry in the series' revival on Netflix.

The writers were conflicted on what to name Baio's character, noting that they wanted to give him an "idiotic" name. Looking for inspiration, co-executive producer Chuck Tatham recalled Loblaws, a chain of supermarkets Tatham frequented during his childhood in Canada. His father would often joke about a man named Bob Loblaw—a pun on "blah blah blah"—and Tatham, remembering the name, wrote it on a blank whiteboard, which series creator Mitchell Hurwitz found humorous. Writers Richard Day and Jim Vallely continued to add more layers to the joke, and they spawned the idea of him owning a law blog entitled "Bob Loblaw's Law Blog". During the documentary fan-film The Arrested Development Documentary Project, Baio revealed that, due to his New York accent, he over-pronounced the "aw" part of Bob Loblaw's name on the first day of filming, so he did not realize the name was a play on words.

Bob Einstein guest starred as George Sr.'s surrogate Larry Middleman in the episode. Other guest stars include Charlize Theron and Justin Grant Wade, playing Rita and Steve Holt, respectively. The reenlistment scene involving Larry—containing words from George Sr. coming out of a garbled sound machine attached to Larry—proved unusual to translate into closed captioning for its television broadcast, requiring the editors to use the audio editor Audacity to create a sound wave of the incomprehensible lines to make them intelligible. The wave was then imported into Photoshop, where every word was translated into text.

== Themes and analysis ==
Christopher C. Kirby, Jonathan Hillard, and Matthew Holmes, writing for the book Arrested Development and Philosophy: They've Made a Huge Mistake, argue that the episode features Gob's only genuine moment of character growth in the series—when he admits to Steve Holt that he is his father, and the two embrace. They argue that this moment carries deeper emotional weight because of how poorly Gob has been treated by George Sr. throughout his life, making the scene both sincere and unaffected by irony. Despite this growth, Gob remains selfish in the episode, as asserted by author Daniel Malloy, with Gob going to great lengths to conceal his mistakes—including drugging himself with his own "Forget-Me-Now" pill just to forget his embrace with Steve. Author Lauren Bratslavsky describes the episode as an example of "Hurwitz [toying] with audiences expectations" regarding the show's incest themes, revealing that Steve is Gob's son and retroactively adding an incestuous element to Steve and Maeby's previously normal relationship. The episode also marks a point where the series becomes less subtle in foreshadowing Rita's later-revealed intellectual disability; she sits on a bench whose obscured sign reads "Wee Brain".

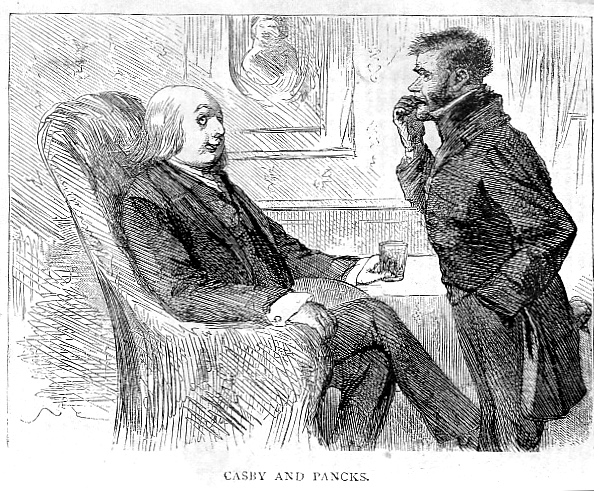
The episode's titular "Forget-Me-Now" pills have been compared to aspects of Charles Dickens's Little Dorrit.

Philosopher Michael Cholbi references the episode heavily in his diagnosis of Gob with bipolar disorder, citing his compulsive use of the "Forget-Me-Now" pill and self-loathing as indicators of depressive tendencies. Similarly, Matthew Gannon interprets "Forget-Me-Now" as a reflection of the show's broader theme of family—how, despite their flaws and often poor judgment, the Bluths care for Michael and shape his personality and values. Throughout Arrested Development, Tobias frequently speaks in innuendos alluding to his closeted homosexuality. As author Navid Sabet observes, the episode is forthright in that regard: Tobias tells the family he used to be both an analyst and a therapist, revealing a business card that combines the two profession titles into "analrapist". The episode holds strong parallels with the book Little Dorrit by Charles Dickens, as does a majority of season three, according to scholar Clayton Carlyle Tarr. He likens the "Forget-Me-Now" pills to the message inscribed inside of the watch found in Little Dorrit, which reads "Do Not Forget". Tarr believed that the "Forget-Me-Now" pills and the watch's message also held a seemingly purposeful difference, as the pills are not as mysterious as the message, which is treated as a bigger revelation; he also finds irony that Little Dorrit emphasizes the act of remembrance, whereas "Forget-Me-Now" centers on forgetting past events.

The episode's unconventional use of cross-dressing further highlights Tobias's gender confusion when he dresses as Lucille, while also differentiating Arrested Development from other sitcoms. Unlike most portrayals that use cross-dressing as a comedic stand-in for homosexuality, the series instead presents it ambiguously—Tobias is performing rather than embodying the role—leaving interpretation up to the audience and not taking any stance in the matter. Larry's role as a surrogate—being passed between different people who control him—has been compared to the idea of "switching souls" between individuals by author Kristopher Phillips. Despite this, his demeanor remains consistent regardless of who is in control, and he stays fully conscious throughout these switches, rarely taking the time to speak his mind. Phillips also likens Larry to ideas of personal identity asserted by philosopher René Descartes, as he exhibits apparent unhappiness from spending time with others throughout the episode, yet still does his job as a surrogate and let others speak their own minds through him. While he considered "Forget-Me-Now" to be incongruous with the rest of Arrested Development for many factors, critic Chad Collins felt the darker humor outweighed any other inconsistency, making its approach to comedy unique for the series.

== Release ==
"Forget-Me-Now" was first broadcast on October 3, 2005, on the Fox Network at 8:00 p.m. Eastern Standard Time in the United States. During its original airing, the episode was watched by 4.47 million viewers. It received a 1.6% share among its target demographic, meaning that it was seen by 1.6% of all households within that group. It marked an increase in viewership from the previous episode, "For British Eyes Only", which had earned a 1.4% rating and drew in 4.02 million viewers. Ultimately, it was the second highest-rated episode of the season, only behind the premiere by 150,000. "Forget-Me-Now" was first released on home video in the United States on August 29, 2006, in the Complete Third Season DVD box set. The set includes audio commentary for the episode from Hurwitz, Will Arnett, Jason Bateman, Michael Cera, David Cross, Tony Hale, Portia de Rossi, Alia Shawkat, and Jessica Walter. Later, the series' first three seasons, including "Forget-Me-Now", were released on Blu-ray exclusively in Region B.

== Reception ==
"While it's incongruous with most of the series, it's a remarkable standalone, an episode abounding with stellar character work and some of the best acting the cast has ever put in. It's not quite a classic, but it's far from forgettable."

— Chad Collins,
/Film

The A.V. Club writer Noel Murray praised the episode, and reacted positively to both its introduction of new characters and meta humor. Murray felt the episode lacked a coherent narrative, but said the humor saved it. Brian Tallerico from Vulture placed the episode 34th in his ranking of the whole series; he criticized the overuse of Rita by this point in the season, but found amusement from the storyline between George Michael, Maeby, and Steve Holt. Joe George of Yahoo! Entertainment listed it as one of the series' funniest, but felt that the storyline of Michael and Rita did not work until the twist-ending of "The Ocean Walker", in which it is revealed that Rita is intellectually disabled. Despite this, he felt that the other subplots made up for many shortcomings. Chad Collins of /Film gave the episode a positive review, calling it one of Arrested Development's most underrated episodes, praising the acting and its emphasis on black comedy. However, Collins went on to criticize the episode for being inconsistent with the rest of the series in how it portrays the Bluth family's immoral tendencies, and how far it is willing to go with said tendencies.

Television writer Erin Mallory Long listed George Michael's line, "What a fun, sexy time for you" as her favorite moment from the series, noting its line delivery, humorous context, and odd wording as her reason for enjoying it. The British stereotypes were considered a highlight by IndieWire's Steve Greene, who called the episode one of the show's greatest, despite feeling it was far from the best use of Rita. He stated that the episode has one of Gob's highlight moments from the series in which, while saying goodbye to Steve, he emotionally repeats "I will", writing that it acts as an example of how Arrested Development utilizes Gob's "tragicomic sweet spot". Matt Fowler of IGN also listed "Forget-Me-Now" as one of the series' finest episodes, ranking it eighth and calling it "fully loaded" in terms of overall content.

Bob Loblaw was voted the "Best Character Name" of the 2005 television season by the writers of Entertainment Weekly. Diana McCorry, another television writer, wrote that the episode's introduction of Bob Loblaw was her favorite Arrested Development moment, finding the character's name to be "stupid", yet "brilliant".
