= 2009 New Jersey elections =

- November 3, 2009

A general election was held in the U.S. state of New Jersey on November 3, 2009. Primary elections were held on June 2. Most state positions were up in this election cycle, which includes all 80 seats in the New Jersey General Assembly, as well as Governor and Lieutenant Governor (which was up for the first time). In addition to the State Legislative elections, numerous county offices and freeholders in addition to municipal offices were up for election. There was one statewide ballot question. Some counties and municipalities may have had local ballot questions as well. Non-partisan local elections, some school board elections, and some fire district elections also happened throughout the year.

== Governor ==
2009 New Jersey gubernatorial election
- November 3, 2009
- Turnout: 46.9%
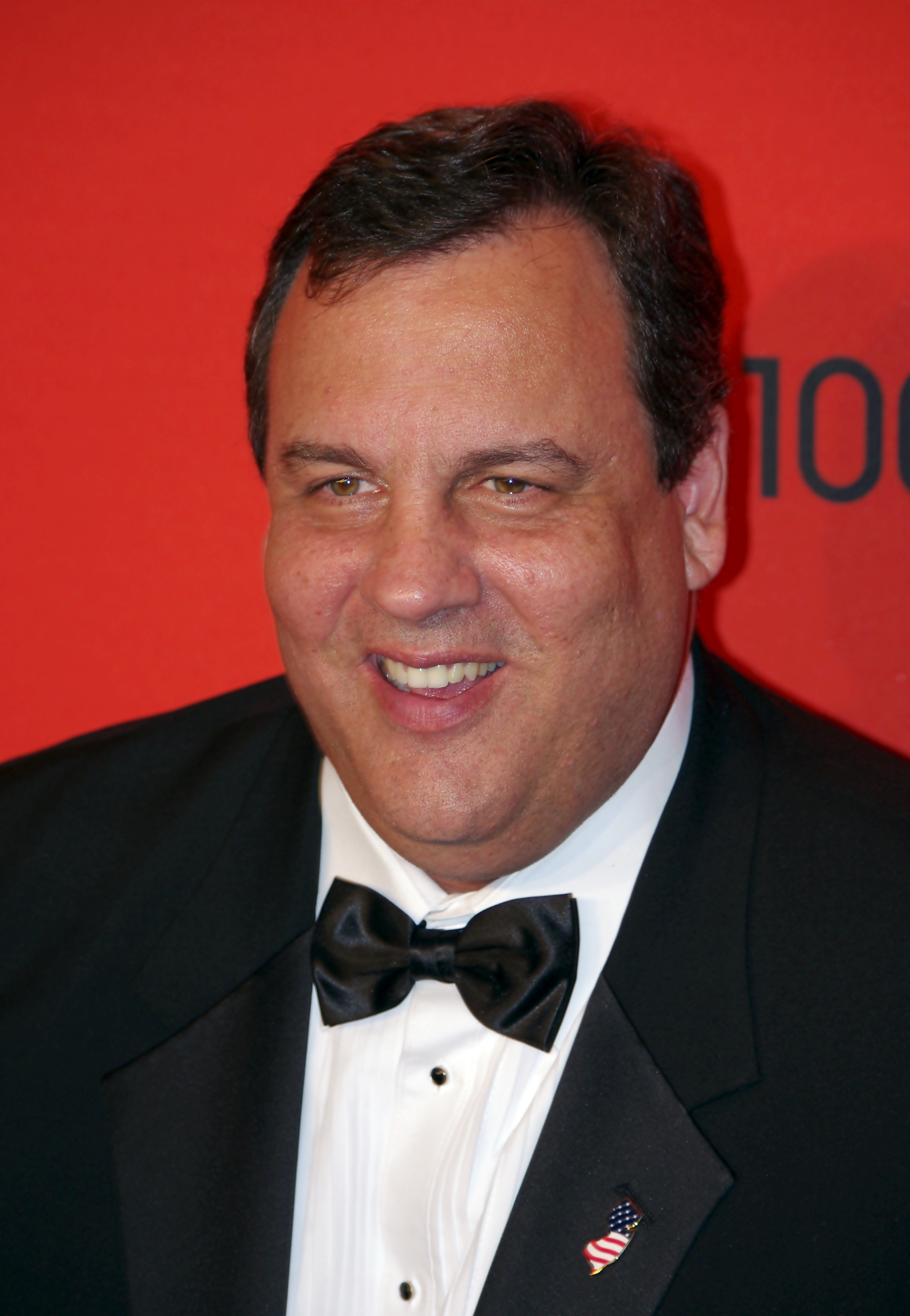

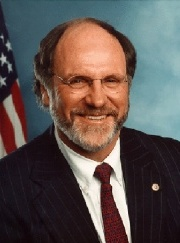

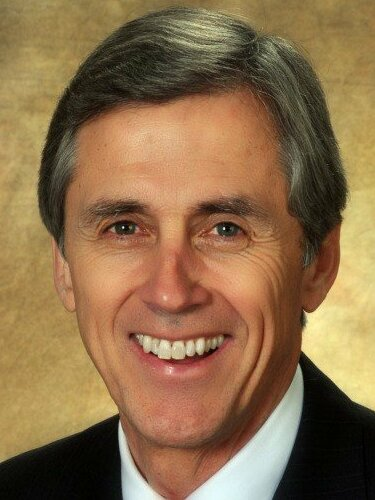
Nominee	Chris Christie	Jon Corzine	Chris Daggett
Party	Republican	Democratic	Independent
Running mate	Kim Guadagno	Loretta Weinberg	Frank Esposito
Popular vote	1,174,445	1,087,731	139,579
Percentage	48.5%	44.9%	5.8%
- Christie: 40–50% 50–60% 60–70% 70–80% 80–90% >90% Corzine: 40–50% 50–60% 60–70% 70–80% 80–90% >90% Tie: 40–50%
Governor before election
Jon Corzine
Democratic
Elected Governor
Chris Christie
Republican

=== Republican primary ===
Former U.S. Attorney Christopher J. Christie had long been considered the front-runner for the Republican nomination. He was heavily favored by the party establishment and had won the endorsement and county line of all county GOP organizations. Christie's chief opponent in the primary was former Bogota mayor Steve Lonegan, known for his very right-wing positions and vocal opposition to the Corzine administration; another staunch conservative, General Assemblyman Rick Merkt was also on the ballot. David Brown, Christian Keller, and Franklin Township mayor Brian D. Levine also filed to run in the Republican primary, but their petitions were challenged by Lonegan and they were disqualified from the ballot when administrative judges ruled that their nominating petitions failed to meet the threshold of 1,000 valid signatures. Upon leaving the race, Brown and Levine endorsed Christie.

Christie and Lonegan attacked each other relentlessly throughout the primary campaign through mailers and robocalls, with each seeking to undermine the other by drawing the public's attention to scandals involving the other. Lonegan proposed ending the state's progressive income tax system and replacing it with a 2.9% flat tax for all New Jerseyans. Christie strongly opposed this proposal, arguing that Lonegan's proposal would amount to a tax increase for most New Jerseyans. Christie instead proposed cutting taxes "across the board," although he refused to say by how much. There were two televised debates, which excluded Merkt, and two radio debates, which included him. Ultimately, Christie was able to win the primary with 55% of the vote to Lonegan's 42% and Merkt's 3%.

The following Republican Primary candidates were removed from the ballot:

- David Brown, Republican of South Brunswick
- Christian Keller, Republican of Leesburg – New Jersey Department of Corrections employee
- Brian D. Levine, Republican of Franklin Township – Mayor of Franklin Township (serving since 2005)

=== Democratic primary ===
Although polls indicated his vulnerability in the general election, Governor Jon S. Corzine was heavily favored to win the Democratic primary over his three little-known challengers. The only one of those to have held elected office, former Glen Ridge mayor Carl Bergmanson, was running on a platform of fiscal discipline, social liberalism, and government reform; he had received the support of the Citizens Against Tolls website. Roger Bacon, Democrat of Phillipsburg, an unsuccessful candidate for the United States House of Representatives in New Jersey's 5th congressional district in 2008, and Jeff Boss, Democrat of Guttenberg, an unsuccessful candidate for United States Senate in 2008, also ran. In the primary, Corzine won renomination with 77% of the vote, while Bergmanson, his closest competitor, received about 9%.

=== General election ===
Since the primaries, polls consistently showed Christie leading Corzine, sometimes by double digits. The election became a three-way race on July 7, when independent candidate Christopher Daggett announced that he had raised enough money to qualify for public funds and to qualify for participation in the debates. On July 20, Christie selected Kim Guadagno as his running mate. On July 24, Corzine announced in an e-mail to his supporters that he had selected Loretta Weinberg as his running mate. On July 27, Daggett announced that he had selected longtime Kean University professor and administrator Frank J. Esposito as his running mate.

Although the economy and taxes have long been prominent issues in the campaign, the issue of ethics and anti-corruption efforts was thrust into the spotlight in July when several public officials were arrested on corruption charges in Operation Bid Rig. One of Corzine's main lines of attack has involved Christie's ties to the unpopular former President of the United States George W. Bush, who appointed Christie to the U.S. Attorney's office in 2001. In August 2009, Bush political strategist Karl Rove revealed that he had held conversations with Christie about a potential gubernatorial run during Christie's time as U.S. Attorney. U.S. Attorneys are prohibited from engaging in partisan political activities by the Hatch Act of 1939. Corzine quickly incorporated this into his advertisements targeting Christie. Nonetheless, Christie defeated Corzine by 4 points.

== Lieutenant governor ==
On November 8, 2005, voters passed a Constitutional amendment to the New Jersey State Constitution which created the office of Lieutenant Governor of New Jersey, the first of whom is to be elected in the 2009 general election and to take office in January 2010. Until the creation of the office, governors who died in office or stepped down were succeeded by the President of the New Jersey Senate. This has happened twice in recent years, with the resignations of Christine Todd Whitman in 2001 and James McGreevey in 2004. Concerns over the separation of powers, as Acting Governors continued to serve concurrently in the Senate, and the fact that Acting Governors were not elected by the people to succeed the Governor led to the Constitutional amendment that created the new office. All 12 candidates for governor appearing on the ballot selected their running mates by the June 27, 2009 deadline.

Chris Christie, the Republican nominee for governor, selected Monmouth Beach's Kim Guadagno, the sheriff of Monmouth County, as his running mate. Others mentioned for the post had included New Jersey Senators Diane Allen and Jennifer Beck, as well as Bergen County Clerk Kathleen Donovan.

Incumbent Governor Jon Corzine, the Democratic nominee, selected Teaneck's Loretta Weinberg, a New Jersey Senator and former New Jersey General Assemblywoman, as his running mate. Other mentioned for the post had included New Jersey Senator Barbara Buono, New Jersey General Assemblywoman Bonnie Watson Coleman, and wealthy businessman Randal Pinkett.

Chris Daggett, an independent candidate who has qualified for matching funds, selected Ocean Township's Frank J. Esposito, a longtime professor and administrator at Kean University who served as an advisor to the Commissioner of Education in the Thomas Kean administration, as his running mate. Others mentioned for the post had included Edison Mayor Jun Choi, Atlantic County freeholder Alisa Cooper, and Passaic County freeholder James Gallagher.

== Legislature ==
=== Senate Special elections ===
- 6th Legislative District: Sen. John Adler (D) resigned his seat to take office in the U.S. House of Representatives. He was replaced in a special election convention in January 2009 by then-Camden County Clerk James Beach. Beach will run in a special election in November to keep the seat for the rest of Adler's four-year term. He is being challenged by Republican Joseph Adolf, former mayor of Magnolia.

State Senator – 6th Legislative District – Results * denotes incumbent
Party	Candidate	Votes	%
Democratic	James Beach * √	36,582	58.1
Republican	Joseph Adolf	26,280	41.9
Total votes		62,862	100

- 23rd Legislative District: Sen. Leonard Lance resigned his seat to take office in the U.S. House of Representatives. He was replaced in a special election convention in January 2009 by then-Assemblywoman Marcia A. Karrow, who was selected over Assemblyman Michael J. Doherty. Doherty declared his candidacy in the primary; he defeated Karrow in the Republican primary by approximately 1,000 votes, with 52% of those cast going to him. Doherty will now run against Democrat Harvey Baron, an orthopedic surgeon, for the remainder of Lance's four-year term in the November special election.

State Senator – 23rd Legislative District – Results
Party	Candidate	Votes	%
Republican	Michael J. Doherty √	51,960	72.0
Democratic	Harvey Baron	20,851	28.0
Total votes		72,811	100

=== General Assembly elections ===
2009 New Jersey General Assembly election
- November 3, 2009

All 80 seats to the General Assembly
	Majority party	Minority party
Leader	Joseph J. Roberts (retired)	Alex DeCroce
Party	Democratic	Republican
Leader since	January 10, 2006	January 12, 2004
Leader's seat	5th (Bellmawr)	26th (Parsippany–Troy Hills)
Last election	48	32
Seats won	47	33
Seat change	▼1	▲1
Popular vote	2,001,772	2,181,345
Percentage	47.6%	51.9%
- Results: Democratic hold Republican hold Republican gain
Speaker before election
Joseph J. Roberts
Democratic
Elected Speaker
Sheila Y. Oliver
Democratic

The 2009 New Jersey General Assembly elections were held on November 3, 2009, for all 80 seats in the lower house of the New Jersey Legislature. The election coincided with a gubernatorial election where Democratic incumbent Governor Jon Corzine was defeated by Republican challenger Chris Christie. Democrats held a 48-32 majority in the lower house prior to the election. The members of the New Jersey Legislature are chosen from 40 electoral districts. Each district elects one State Senator and two State Assembly members. New Jersey uses coterminous legislative districts for both its State Senate and General Assembly.

The Democratic Party won a 47-33 majority while losing the popular vote. Republicans were able to flip one seat in the 4th district.

==== Overall results ====
Summary of the November 3, 2009 New Jersey General Assembly election results:

↓
47	33
Democratic	Republican

Parties	Candidates	Seats				Popular Vote		
Parties	Candidates	2007	2009	+/-	Strength	Vote	%	Change
Democratic	79	48	47	▼1	59%	2,001,772	47.6%	0.0%
Republican	78	32	33	▲1	41%	2,181,345	51.9%	0.0%
Green	1	0	0	Steady	0%	1,635	0.2%	0.0%
Libertarian	2	0	0	Steady	0%	1,823	0.3%	0.0%
Total	160	80	80	0	100.0%	4,186,575	100.0%	-

- 1st Legislative District: This district was considered a battleground in the 2009 General Assembly election. Incumbent Democrats Matthew Milam and Nelson Albano were seeking a second and third term respectively. They were being challenged by 2007 candidate Michael Donohue, an attorney, and John McCann, a real estate agent in Ocean City who chaired that city's Republican committee. Upper Township Committeeman Frank Conrad was Donohue's running mate until June 20, 2009, when he withdrew from the race to focus on his highway safety equipment business. The GOP was vigorously pursuing the seats. Republican polling released on August 19 showed Republicans winning these Assembly seats in a generic ballot test, 48% to 29%. These were the only Democratic seats forecast as "Leans Republican" by PolitickerNJ.com.
- 3rd Legislative District: Democratic Assemblyman Doug Fisher resigned his seat in March 2009 to be sworn in as New Jersey Secretary of Agriculture. Fisher was replaced by Celeste Riley, previously a Bridgeton Council President. Surgeon Robert Villare and commercial oven repairman Lee Lucas won the Republican nomination over former Cumberland County surrogate and freeholder Arthur Marchand and Greenwich Township mayor George Shivery. While the state GOP did not view Villare and Lucas as viable candidates, and Riley and fellow incumbent John J. Burzichelli were expected to win easily with PolitickerNJ.com forecasted these seats as "Safe Democratic," the race for the second seat was closer than anticipated, with Riley besting Villare by a little more than 1200 votes.
- 4th Legislative District: Democratic Assemblywoman Sandra Love announced that she would not run for a second term, citing health issues. The other incumbent assemblyman, Democrat Paul Moriarty, was running for re-election with new running mate Bill Collins, formerly of the Gloucester Township school board. Former Gloucester Township Councilman Eugene E.T. Lawrence, who served on the council as a Democrat, was nominated in the Republican primary, having switched parties to express his disdain for Governor Corzine's budget proposals. Dominick DiCicco of Franklinville, who was endorsed by Newt Gingrich in the primary, was the other Republican nominee. DiCicco is currently the Chief Legal Officer of North American Claim Operation for Zurich Financial Services. Lawrence and DiCicco defeated Andrew Savicky in the Republican primary. Republican polling released on August 19 showed Republicans winning these Assembly seats in a generic ballot test, 41% to 33%. However, PolitickerNJ.com had classified these seats as "Likely Democratic." Unofficial results show Moriarty being re-elected, with DiCicco defeating Collins by a little more than 1,000 votes. Republicans gained one seat here.
- 5th Legislative District: Democratic Assemblywoman Nilsa Cruz-Perez is retiring after fourteen years in office. Camden City Council President Angel Fuentes was nominated in the Democratic primary to take her place on the ballot. Joe Roberts, a veteran assemblyman and the current Assembly Speaker, was also nominated in the June primary; however, on September 2, he announced that he would not be seeking re-election after all, saying at a state house press conference, "I think it’s, from my perspective, just time to take a break." Party leaders selected Fuentes's new running mate on September 12: labor leader Donald Norcross, who is also a Camden County Democratic Party co-chair and South Jersey political boss George Norcross's brother. The Republican nominees in this heavily Democratic district were Brian Kluchnick of Haddon Heights and Stepfanie Velez-Gentry of Bellmawr. PolitickerNJ.com forecasted these seats as "Safe Democratic.".
  Winners: Norcross & Fuentes
- 9th Legislative District: Republican Assemblyman Daniel Van Pelt resigned and withdrew from his re-election bid on July 31, after being indicted on corruption charges. He was replaced on the ballot by DiAnne Gove, the former mayor and a current commissioner of Long Beach Township. Incumbent Republican Brian E. Rumpf was running for re-election. The Democratic nominees were attorneys Rich Visotcky of Stafford Township and Rob Rue of Tuckerton. PolitickerNJ.com forecasted these seats as "Safe Republican.".
  Winners: Rumpf & Gove
- 12th Legislative District: The Democratic Party was targeting freshmen Republican incumbents Declan O'Scanlon and Caroline Casagrande. Democrats have a registration edge of 10,000 voters in the district. Former Manalapan Mayor and current township committeewoman Michelle Roth was running on a Democratic ticket with John Amberg of Tinton Falls, a teacher in the Irvington Public Schools. The Council on Affordable Housing is a major issue in the district, especially in towns like Marlboro, where Mayor Jon Hornik told Governor Corzine: "If you don’t kill COAH, it will kill my town." Casagrande and O'Scanlon both voted against the Democratic affordable housing bill in 2008; it passed anyway. Roth and Amberg did not take a stance on COAH on their website. Instead, they were campaigning on a platform of ending fiscal waste and improving government transparency. PolitickerNJ.com forecasted these seats as "Likely Republican.".
  Winners: Casagrande & O'Scanlon
- 14th Legislative District: Democratic incumbents Linda Greenstein and Wayne DeAngelo represent a district that elected a Republican, Bill Baroni, to the New Jersey Senate that same year. Because this district is heavily populated by unionized state workers, being pro-labor is considered a tremendous asset in this district. Republican gubernatorial nominee Chris Christie has supported the reduction of state workers to cut state spending, however; thus, alignment with Christie is something of a liability in this district. On the other hand, many state workers are also dissatisfied with Governor Corzine's imposition of unpaid furloughs and wage freezes. As a result of all of this, the district was considered highly competitive. The Republican challengers were Robert Calabro, a member of the Hamilton planning board who owns food markets and cafes in Hamilton and Trenton, and attorney William Harvey, also of Hamilton. Brian Hackett, a 21-year-old student activist at The College of New Jersey, was defeated in the primary. Gene Baldassari, who was added to the ballot by petition, was the first New Jersey candidate of the Modern Whig Party ever. Republican polling released on August 19 showed Republicans winning these Assembly seats in a generic ballot test, 47% to 36%. However, PolitickerNJ.com classified these seats as "Safe Democratic.".
  Winners: Greenstein & DeAngelo
- 19th Legislative District: Upon being indicted on corruption charges, Democratic Assemblyman Joseph Vas announced that he would not seek a second term. Jack O'Leary, longtime Mayor of South Amboy, took Vas's place on a ticket with incumbent Democrat John S. Wisniewski. However, dogged by a state investigation into his insurance business and intra-party pressure to bow out of the race, O'Leary ended his campaign on August 17. He was replaced on the ballot on September 2 by Craig Coughlin of Woodbridge, a retired municipal judge who currently serves as Woodbridge's municipal attorney and previously served as Carteret's borough attorney and as a South Amboy Councilman. Peter Kothari, an Indian-American businessman, was running on the GOP ticket with Perth Amboy real estate broker Richard Piatkowski, who ran for Congress in 2004. James Poesl, an environmental emergency response professional from Woodbridge, was running as an "Independent Conservative." Polling released on August 19 showed Republicans winning these Assembly seats in a generic ballot test, 46% to 31%. However, PolitickerNJ.com classified these seats as "Likely Democratic.">>.
  Winners: Wisniewski & Coughlin
- 20th Legislative District: Democratic Assemblyman Neil M. Cohen resigned on July 28, 2008, while under investigation by state authorities for possession of child pornography. (Cohen has since been indicted for official misconduct, possession of child pornography, and reproduction and distribution of child pornography.) Elizabeth attorney Annette Quijano was selected to complete Cohen's term in the Assembly; she ran for election to a term in her own right as the running mate of veteran Democratic Assemblyman and State Democratic Chairman Joseph Cryan of Union Township. Quijano and Cryan ran unopposed.
  Winners: Cryan & Quijano
- 21st Legislative District: Republican Assemblyman Eric Munoz died in office on March 30, 2009, at the age of 61. A special convention selected his widow, Nancy Munoz, as his successor. She then defeated Long Hill Township Mayor George Vitureira and Long Hill school board member Bruce Meringolo for the seat in the Republican primary. Former Cranford mayor Norman Albert and Springfield attorney Bruce Bergen ran on the Democratic ticket. The late Munoz's running mate, Republican Jon Bramnick, ran successfully for re-election; Nancy Munoz was elected to her first full term. PolitickerNJ.com forecast these seats as "Safe Republican."
  Winners: Bramnick & Munoz
- 23rd Legislative District: Republican Assemblywoman Marcia A. Karrow resigned her assembly seat to succeed newly elected U.S. Representative Leonard Lance in the New Jersey Senate. Karrow was replaced in the General Assembly by then-Warren County freeholder John DiMaio. The other assemblyman from this district, Michael J. Doherty, challenged Karrow in the Republican primary for the Senate seat and won, thus giving up his seat in the Assembly to run for Senate. In the Republican primary for the assembly seats, DiMaio and Hunterdon County freeholder Erik Peterson narrowly won the nomination, edging Doherty's chief of staff, Edward Smith. The Democratic nominees in this overwhelmingly Republican district were William Courtney of Readington and Tammeisha Smith of Columbia; DiMaio and Peterson defeated them easily. PolitickerNJ.com forecast these seats as "Safe Republican."
  Winners: DiMaio & Peterson
- 25th Legislative District: Republican Assemblyman Rick Merkt decided to run for governor rather than seek re-election to his seat. Attorney Tony Bucco, the son of New Jersey Senator Anthony Bucco, ran against Morris County freeholder Douglas Cabana for Merkt's seat in the Republican primary. Bucco defeated Cabana by less than 800 votes; putting him on a ticket with incumbent Republican Michael Patrick Carroll. The Democratic nominees in this district were Rebekah Conroy of Morristown and Wendy Wright of Boonton Township. Carroll and Bucco won easily in this Republican stronghold. PolitickerNJ.com forecast these seats as "Safe Republican."
  Winners: Bucco & Carroll
- 31st Legislative District: Democratic Assemblyman L. Harvey Smith did not seek re-election in 2009. Charles Mainor, a police detective from Jersey City, won the Democratic primary, defeating Ronnie Meadows and Monique Snow; putting him on a ticket with incumbent Democrat Anthony Chiappone. Since Smith's arrest on corruption charges in July, he has been under pressure from Democratic Party leaders to resign; if he does so, Mainor would probably be appointed to Smith's seat. Chiappone was indicted for theft by deception, among other charges, on August 26, but neither resigned nor withdrew from his re-election bid. The Republican nominees in this overwhelmingly Democratic district were attorney Irene Kim Asbury and health instructor Marie Day. PolitickerNJ.com forecast these seats as "Safe Democratic."
  Winners: Mainor & Chiappone Mainor and the indicted Chiappone both won the election.
- 36th Legislative District: Democratic incumbents Gary Schaer and Frederick Scalera were considered Republican targets. Schaer and Scalera were challenged by the same ticket that came very close to unseating them in the 2007 election: Carlstadt school board member Don Diorio and real estate investment manager Carmen Pio Costa of Nutley. Diorio has said that if elected he would "vote independently, beholden to no political party and no special interest," while Pio Costa promised to stand up for the interests of suburbs by fighting for municipal aid reform. Schaer and Scalera have supported Governor Corzine's budget, which the GOP opposes, as well as the EnCap program which nearly lost them the election in 2007. PolitickerNJ.com ranked this pair of seats the second-most-vulnerable for Democrats.
  Winners: Scalera & Schaer Nevertheless, Schaer and Scalera were re-elected.
- 39th Legislative District: Republican Assemblyman John E. Rooney announced that he will retire after fourteen terms in office. Rooney and the party establishment both endorsed Bob Schroeder, longtime Washington Township councilman and two-time council president, for the seat. Schroeder ran on a ticket with veteran assemblywoman Charlotte Vandervalk; they defeated John Shahdanian, a labor attorney and the municipal chairman in Old Tappan, and Michael McCarthy, the political director of a stage hands' union, were running on the Democratic ticket. No Democrat has been elected by this district since 1977; PolitickerNJ.com forecast these seats as "Safe Republican."
  Winners: Vandervalk & Schroeder

== Ballot measures ==
One statewide question was on the ballot which was approved by voters:

- Public Question Number 1, $400 million for open space, farmland, historic areas.

Question 1 Results by county Yes: 60–70%; 50–60%; No: 50–60%

== Local offices ==
Various county and municipal elections were held simultaneously, including elections for mayor in Jersey City.

== See also ==
- 2009 New Jersey General Assembly election
- 2009 New Jersey gubernatorial election
