= The Retrieval of Ethics =

- Author: Talbot Brewer
- Language: English
- Subject: ethics
- Publisher: Oxford University Press
- Publication date: 2009
- Pages: 344
- ISBN: 9780199557882

The Retrieval of Ethics is a 2009 book by Talbot Brewer in which the author tries to re-examine the history of ethics from ancient Greek philosophy to the present and “retrieve” the strengths of the Ancients in order to provide a radical reconception of moral philosophy and its role in life.

== Reception ==
Brewer's ideas have been criticized by different scholars including Lorraine Besser-Jones, Bradford Cokelet, Christopher Cordner, Mark LeBar and Tamar Schapiro.
