= 2009 New Jersey General Assembly election =

- November 3, 2009

All 80 seats to the General Assembly 41 seats needed for a majority
- Turnout: 47% (▲15pp)
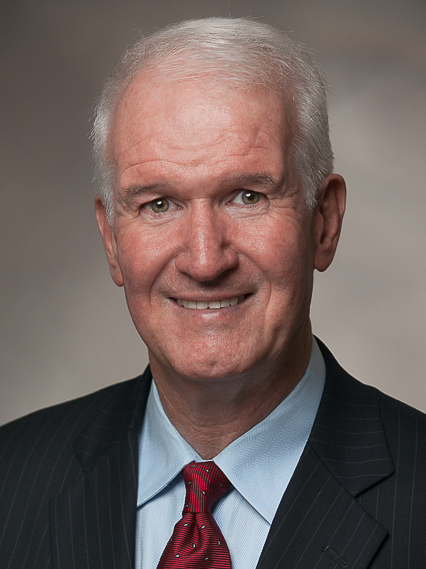

| | Majority party | Minority party |
|---|---|---|
| Leader | Joseph J. Roberts (retired) | Alex DeCroce |
| Party | Democratic | Republican |
| Leader since | January 10, 2006 | January 12, 2004 |
| Leader's seat | 5th (Bellmawr) | 26th (Parsippany–Troy Hills) |
| Last election | 48 | 32 |
| Seats won | 47 | 33 |
| Seat change | ▼1 | ▲1 |
| Popular vote | 2,001,772 | 2,181,345 |
| Percentage | 47.6% | 51.9% |
- Results: Democratic hold Republican hold Republican gain
Speaker before election
Joseph J. Roberts
Democratic
Elected Speaker
Sheila Y. Oliver
Democratic

The 2009 New Jersey General Assembly elections were held on November 3, 2009, for all 80 seats in the lower house of the New Jersey Legislature. The election coincided with a gubernatorial election where Democratic incumbent Governor Jon Corzine was defeated by Republican challenger Chris Christie. Democrats held a 48–32 majority in the lower house prior to the election. The members of the New Jersey Legislature are chosen from 40 electoral districts. Each district elects one State Senator and two State Assembly members. New Jersey uses coterminous legislative districts for both its State Senate and General Assembly.

The Democratic Party won a 47–33 majority while losing the popular vote. Republicans were able to flip one seat in the 4th district.

== Incumbents not seeking re-election ==
=== Democratic ===
- Sandra Love, District 4
- Nilsa Cruz-Perez, District 5
- Joseph J. Roberts, District 5
- John O'Leary, District 19
- L. Harvey Smith, District 31

=== Republican ===
- Michael J. Doherty, District 23 (ran for State Senate)
- Rick Merkt, District 25 (ran for Governor)
- John E. Rooney, District 39

== Overall results ==
Summary of the November 3, 2009 New Jersey General Assembly election results:

↓
| 47 | 33 |
| Democratic | Republican |

| Parties | Candidates | Seats | | | | Popular Vote | | |
| Parties | Candidates | 2007 | 2009 | +/- | Strength | Vote | % | Change |
|---|---|---|---|---|---|---|---|---|
| Democratic | 79 | 48 | 47 | ▼1 | 59% | 2,001,772 | 47.6% | 0.0% |
| Republican | 78 | 32 | 33 | ▲1 | 41% | 2,181,345 | 51.9% | 0.0% |
| Green | 1 | 0 | 0 | Steady | 0% | 1,635 | 0.05% | 0.0% |
| Libertarian | 2 | 0 | 0 | Steady | 0% | 1,823 | 0.05% | 0.0% |
| Independent | 11 | 0 | 0 | Steady | 0% | 13,912 | 0.4% | 0.0% |
| Total | 171 | 80 | 80 | 0 | 100.0% | 4,200,487 | 100.0% | - |

== Summary of results by district ==
| Legislative District | Position | Incumbent | Party | Elected Assembly Member | Party |
|---|---|---|---|---|---|
| 1st | 1 | Nelson Albano | Democratic | Nelson Albano | Democrat |
| 1st | 2 | Matthew Milam | Democrat | Matthew Milam | Democratic |
| 2nd | 1 | John Amodeo | Republican | John Amodeo | Republican |
| 2nd | 2 | Vincent Polistina | Republican | Vincent Polistina | Republican |
| 3rd | 1 | John J. Burzichelli | Democrat | John J. Burzichelli | Democrat |
| 3rd | 2 | Celeste Riley | Democrat | Celeste Riley | Democrat |
| 4th | 1 | Paul D. Moriarty | Democrat | Paul D. Moriarty | Democrat |
| 4th | 2 | Sandra Love | Democrat | Domenick DiCicco | Republican |
| 5th | 1 | Nilsa Cruz-Perez | Democrat | Angel Fuentes | Democrat |
| 5th | 2 | Joseph J. Roberts | Democrat | Donald Norcross | Democrat |
| 6th | 1 | Louis Greenwald | Democrat | Louis Greenwald | Democrat |
| 6th | 2 | Pamela Rosen Lampitt | Democrat | Pamela Rosen Lampitt | Democrat |
| 7th | 1 | Herb Conaway | Democrat | Herb Conaway | Democrat |
| 7th | 2 | Jack Conners | Democrat | Jack Conners | Democrat |
| 8th | 1 | Dawn Addiego | Republican | Dawn Addiego | Republican |
| 8th | 2 | Scott Rudder | Republican | Scott Rudder | Republican |
| 9th | 1 | Brian E. Rumpf | Republican | Brian E. Rumpf | Republican |
| 9th | 2 | Daniel Van Pelt | Republican | DiAnne Gove | Republican |
| 10th | 1 | James W. Holzapfel | Republican | James W. Holzapfel | Republican |
| 10th | 2 | David W. Wolfe | Republican | David W. Wolfe | Republican |
| 11th | 1 | Mary Pat Angelini | Republican | Mary Pat Angelini | Republican |
| 11th | 2 | David Rible | Republican | David Rible | Republican |
| 12th | 1 | Declan O'Scanlon | Republican | Declan O'Scanlon | Republican |
| 12th | 2 | Caroline Casagrande | Republican | Caroline Casagrande | Republican |
| 13th | 1 | Samuel D. Thompson | Republican | Samuel D. Thompson | Republican |
| 13th | 2 | Amy Handlin | Republican | Amy Handlin | Republican |
| 14th | 1 | Wayne DeAngelo | Democrat | Wayne DeAngelo | Democrat |
| 14th | 2 | Linda Greenstein | Democrat | Linda Greenstein | Democrat |
| 15th | 1 | Bonnie Watson Coleman | Democrat | Bonnie Watson Coleman | Democrat |
| 15th | 2 | Reed Gusciora | Democrat | Reed Gusciora | Democrat |
| 16th | 1 | Peter Biondi | Republican | Peter Biondi | Republican |
| 16th | 2 | Denise Coyle | Republican | Denise Coyle | Republican |
| 17th | 1 | Upendra Chivukula | Democrat | Upendra Chivukula | Democrat |
| 17th | 2 | Joseph V. Egan | Democrat | Joseph V. Egan | Democrat |
| 18th | 1 | Peter Barnes | Democrat | Peter Barnes | Democrat |
| 18th | 2 | Patrick J. Diegnan | Democrat | Patrick J. Diegnan | Democrat |
| 19th | 1 | John O'Leary | Democrat | Craig Coughlin | Democrat |
| 19th | 2 | John Wisniewski | Democrat | John Wisniewski | Democrat |
| 20th | 1 | Annette Quijano | Democrat | Annette Quijano | Democrat |
| 20th | 2 | Joseph Cryan | Democrat | Joseph Cryan | Democrat |
| 21st | 1 | Jon Bramnick | Republican | Jon Bramnick | Republican |
| 21st | 2 | Nancy Munoz | Republican | Nancy Munoz | Republican |
| 22nd | 1 | Linda Stender | Democrat | Linda Stender | Democrat |
| 22nd | 2 | Jerry Green | Democrat | Jerry Green | Democrat |
| 23rd | 1 | Michael J. Doherty | Republican | Erik Peterson | Republican |
| 23rd | 2 | John DiMaio | Republican | John DiMaio | Republican |
| 24th | 1 | Gary Chiusano | Republican | Gary Chiusano | Republican |
| 24th | 2 | Alison Littell McHose | Republican | Alison Littell McHose | Republican |
| 25th | 1 | Rick Merkt | Republican | Tony Bucco | Republican |
| 25th | 2 | Michael Patrick Carroll | Republican | Michael Patrick Carroll | Republican |
| 26th | 1 | Alex DeCroce | Republican | Alex DeCroce | Republican |
| 26th | 2 | Jay Webber | Republican | Jay Webber | Republican |
| 27th | 1 | John F. McKeon | Democrat | John F. McKeon | Democrat |
| 27th | 2 | Mila Jasey | Democrat | Mila Jasey | Democrat |
| 28th | 1 | Cleopatra Tucker | Democrat | Cleopatra Tucker | Democrat |
| 28th | 2 | Ralph R. Caputo | Democrat | Ralph R. Caputo | Democrat |
| 29th | 1 | Albert Coutinho | Democrat | Albert Coutinho | Democrat |
| 29th | 2 | L. Grace Spencer | Democrat | L. Grace Spencer | Democrat |
| 30th | 1 | Joseph Malone | Republican | Joseph Malone | Republican |
| 30th | 2 | Ronald S. Dancer | Republican | Ronald S. Dancer | Republican |
| 31st | 1 | L. Harvey Smith | Democrat | Charles Mainor | Democrat |
| 31st | 2 | Anthony Chiappone | Democrat | Anthony Chiappone | Democrat |
| 32nd | 1 | Joan M. Quigley | Democrat | Joan Quigley | Democrat |
| 32nd | 2 | Vincent Prieto | Democrat | Vincent Prieto | Democrat |
| 33rd | 1 | Ruben Ramos | Democrat | Ruben Ramos | Democrat |
| 33rd | 2 | Caridad Rodriguez | Democrat | Caridad Rodriguez | Democrat |
| 34th | 1 | Thomas P. Giblin | Democrat | Thomas P. Giblin | Democrat |
| 34th | 2 | Sheila Oliver | Democrat | Sheila Oliver | Democrat |
| 35th | 1 | Nellie Pou | Democrat | Nellie Pou | Democrat |
| 35th | 2 | Elease Evans | Democrat | Elease Evans | Democrat |
| 36th | 1 | Gary Schaer | Democrat | Gary Schaer | Democrat |
| 36th | 2 | Frederick Scalera | Democrat | Frederick Scalera | Democrat |
| 37th | 1 | Gordon M. Johnson | Democrat | Gordon M. Johnson | Democrat |
| 37th | 2 | Valerie Huttle | Democrat | Valerie Huttle | Democrat |
| 38th | 1 | Joan Voss | Democrat | Joan Voss | Democrat |
| 38th | 2 | Connie Wagner | Democrat | Connie Wagner | Democrat |
| 39th | 1 | Charlotte Vandervalk | Republican | Charlotte Vandervalk | Republican |
| 39th | 2 | John E. Rooney | Republican | Robert Schroeder | Republican |
| 40th | 1 | Scott Rumana | Republican | Scott Rumana | Republican |
| 40th | 2 | David C. Russo | Republican | David Russo | Republican |

=== Close races ===
Districts where the difference of total votes between the top-two parties was under 10%:

1. District 4, 1.8% gain R
2. District 18, 3.0%
3. District 1, 5.0%
4. District 22, 6.2%
5. District 3, 7.6%
6. District 14, 9.6%

== List of races ==
=== District 1 ===
2009 New Jersey General Assembly election for the 1st Legislative District
| Party | Candidate | Votes | % | ±% |
|---|---|---|---|---|
| Democratic | Nelson Albano (Incumbent) | 32,375 | 27.7 | |
| Democratic | Matthew Milam (Incumbent) | 29,810 | 25.5 | |
| Republican | Michael J. Donohue | 27,705 | 23.7 | |
| Republican | John A. McCann | 26,778 | 22.9 | |
| Total votes | | 116,688 | 100.0 | |

=== District 2 ===
2009 New Jersey General Assembly election for the 2nd Legislative District
| Party | Candidate | Votes | % | ±% |
|---|---|---|---|---|
| Republican | John Amodeo (Incumbent) | 33,787 | 30.3 | |
| Republican | Vincent J. Polistina (Incumbent) | 32,981 | 29.6 | |
| Democratic | Jimmy Martinez | 22,430 | 20.1 | |
| Democratic | Reginald Floyd | 22,316 | 20.0 | |
| Total votes | | 111,514 | 100.0 | |

=== District 3 ===
2009 New Jersey General Assembly election for the 3rd Legislative District
| Party | Candidate | Votes | % | ±% |
|---|---|---|---|---|
| Democratic | John Burzichelli (Incumbent) | 35,423 | 28.3 | |
| Democratic | Celeste Riley (Incumbent) | 31,888 | 25.5 | |
| Republican | Robert Villare | 30,526 | 24.4 | |
| Republican | Lee Lucas | 27,316 | 21.8 | |
| Total votes | | 125,153 | 100.0 | |

=== District 4 ===
2009 New Jersey General Assembly election for the 4th Legislative District
| Party | Candidate | Votes | % | ±% |
|---|---|---|---|---|
| Democratic | Paul D. Moriarty (incumbent) | 28,680 | 26.3 | |
| Republican | Domenick DiCicco | 27,408 | 25.2 | |
| Democratic | William Collins | 26,807 | 24.6 | |
| Republican | Eugene E. T. Lawrence | 26,027 | 23.9 | |
| Total votes | | 108,922 | 100.0 | |

=== District 5 ===
2009 New Jersey General Assembly election for the 5th Legislative District
| Party | Candidate | Votes | % | ±% |
|---|---|---|---|---|
| Democratic | Donald Norcross | 25,384 | 30.9 | |
| Democratic | Angel Fuentes | 25,188 | 30.7 | |
| Republican | Brian Kluchnick | 15,812 | 19.3 | |
| Republican | Stepfanie Velez-Gentry | 15,748 | 19.1 | |
| Total votes | | 82,132 | 100.0 | |

=== District 6 ===
2009 New Jersey General Assembly election for the 6th Legislative District
| Party | Candidate | Votes | % | ±% |
|---|---|---|---|---|
| Democratic | Louis Greenwald (incumbent) | 36,446 | 29.5 | |
| Democratic | Pamela Rosen Lampitt (incumbent) | 33,320 | 27.0 | |
| Republican | Scot DeCristofaro | 27,005 | 21.9 | |
| Republican | Brian Greenberg | 26,581 | 21.5 | |
| Total votes | | 123,352 | 100.0 | |

=== District 7 ===
2009 New Jersey General Assembly election for the 7th Legislative District
| Party | Candidate | Votes | % | ±% |
|---|---|---|---|---|
| Democratic | Herb Conaway (Incumbent) | 36,127 | 31.9 | |
| Democratic | Jack Conners (Incumbent) | 35,156 | 31.0 | |
| Republican | Leah J. Arter | 21,332 | 18.8 | |
| Republican | Harry Adams | 20,763 | 18.3 | |
| Total votes | | 113,378 | 100.0 | |

=== District 8 ===
2009 New Jersey General Assembly election for the 8th Legislative District
| Party | Candidate | Votes | % |
|---|---|---|---|
| Republican | Dawn Marie Addiego (incumbent) | 42,129 | 31.1 |
| Republican | Scott Rudder (incumbent) | 40,679 | 30.0 |
| Democratic | Debbie Sarcone | 26,397 | 19.5 |
| Democratic | Bill Brown | 26,384 | 19.5 |
| Total votes | | 135,589 | 100.0 |

=== District 9 ===
2009 New Jersey General Assembly election for the 9th Legislative District
| Party | Candidate | Votes | % | ±% |
|---|---|---|---|---|
| Republican | Brian E. Rumpf (incumbent) | 54,311 | 34.2 | |
| Republican | DiAnne Gove | 52,667 | 33.2 | |
| Democratic | Richard P. Visotcky | 26,482 | 16.7 | |
| Democratic | Robert E. Rue | 25,365 | 16.0 | |
| Total votes | | 158,825 | 100.0 | |

=== District 10 ===
2009 New Jersey General Assembly election for the 10th Legislative District
| Party | Candidate | Votes | % | ±% |
|---|---|---|---|---|
| Republican | David W. Wolfe (incumbent) | 47,336 | 36.4 | |
| Republican | James W. Holzapfel (incumbent) | 45,916 | 35.3 | |
| Democratic | Charles P. Tivenan | 18,739 | 14.4 | |
| Democratic | Eli L. Eytan | 18,090 | 13.9 | |
| Total votes | | 130,081 | 100.0 | |

=== District 11 ===
2009 New Jersey General Assembly election for the 11th Legislative District
| Party | Candidate | Votes | % | ±% |
|---|---|---|---|---|
| Republican | Mary Pat Angelini (Incumbent) | 36,278 | 30.9 | |
| Republican | David Rible (Incumbent) | 35,936 | 30.7 | |
| Democratic | J. Randy Bishop | 22,956 | 19.6 | |
| Democratic | Richard J. Bolger | 22,063 | 18.8 | |
| Total votes | | 117,233 | 100.0 | |

=== District 12 ===
2009 New Jersey General Assembly election for the 12th Legislative District
| Party | Candidate | Votes | % | ±% |
|---|---|---|---|---|
| Republican | Declan O'Scanlon | 42,932 | 31.3 | |
| Republican | Caroline Casagrande | 42,662 | 31.1 | |
| Democratic | Michelle Roth | 25,891 | 18.9 | |
| Democratic | John Amberg | 24,125 | 17.6 | |
| Green | Steven Welzer | 1,635 | 1.2 | |
| Total votes | | 137,245 | 100.0 | |

=== District 13 ===
2009 New Jersey General Assembly election for the 13th Legislative District
| Party | Candidate | Votes | % | ±% |
|---|---|---|---|---|
| Republican | Amy H. Handlin | 39,998 | 32.9 | |
| Republican | Samuel D. Thompson | 38,967 | 32.1 | |
| Democratic | Robert "Bob" Brown | 20,371 | 16.8 | |
| Democratic | James Grenafege | 18,769 | 15.4 | |
| Fight Corruption | Sean Dunne | 3,388 | 2.8 | |
| Total votes | | 121,493 | 100.0 | |

=== District 14 ===
2009 New Jersey General Assembly election for the 14th Legislative District
| Party | Candidate | Votes | % | ±% |
|---|---|---|---|---|
| Democratic | Linda R. Greenstein | 37,958 | 28.2 | |
| Democratic | Wayne DeAngelo | 35,791 | 26.6 | |
| Republican | Rob Calabro | 30,479 | 22.6 | |
| Republican | William T. Harvey, Jr. | 29,530 | 21.9 | |
| Modern Whig | Gene L. Baldassari | 859 | 0.6 | |
| Total votes | | 134,617 | 100.0 | |

=== District 15 ===
2009 New Jersey General Assembly election for the 15th Legislative District
| Party | Candidate | Votes | % | ±% |
|---|---|---|---|---|
| Democratic | Bonnie Watson Coleman (Incumbent) | 29,713 | 33.0 | |
| Democratic | Reed Gusciora (Incumbent) | 29,215 | 32.4 | |
| Republican | Kim Taylor | 15,418 | 17.1 | |
| Republican | Wemer Graf | 14,781 | 16.4 | |
| New Jersey Libertarian Party | Daryl Mikell Brooks | 939 | 0.01 | |
| New Jersey Libertarian Party | Charles Green | 884 | 0.01 | |
| Total votes | | 90,050 | 100.0 | |

=== District 16 ===
2009 New Jersey General Assembly election for the 16th Legislative District
| Party | Candidate | Votes | % | ±% |
|---|---|---|---|---|
| Republican | Peter J. Biondi (Incumbent) | 45,199 | 33.9 | |
| Republican | Denise Coyle (Incumbent) | 44,612 | 33.4 | |
| Democratic | Roberta Karpinecz | 22,172 | 16.6 | |
| Democratic | Mark Petraske | 21,394 | 16.0 | |
| Total votes | | 133,377 | 100.0 | |

=== District 17 ===
2009 New Jersey General Assembly election for the 17th Legislative District
| Party | Candidate | Votes | % |
|---|---|---|---|
| Democratic | Joseph V. Egan (incumbent) | 29,876 | 32.4 |
| Democratic | Upendra J. Chivukula (incumbent) | 28,030 | 30.4 |
| Republican | Anthony Mazzola | 18,023 | 19.5 |
| Republican | Salim A. Nathoo | 16,419 | 17.8 |
| Total votes | | 92,348 | 100.0 |

=== District 18 ===
2009 New Jersey General Assembly for the 18th Legislative District
| Party | Candidate | Votes | % | ±% |
|---|---|---|---|---|
| Democratic | Peter J. Barnes (incumbent) | 26,658 | 25.9 | |
| Democratic | Patrick J. Diegnan (incumbent) | 26,317 | 25.6 | |
| Republican | Joseph Sinagra | 24,091 | 23.4 | |
| Republican | Robert Jones | 22,727 | 22.1 | |
| Defending Forgotten Taxpayers | Katherine Shkolar | 1,671 | 1.6 | |
| Defending Forgotten Taxpayers | Andrew Tidd | 1,351 | 1.3 | |
| Total votes | | 102,815 | 100.0 | |

=== District 19 ===
2009 New Jersey General Assembly for the 19th Legislative District
| Party | Candidate | Votes | % | ±% |
|---|---|---|---|---|
| Democratic | John Wisniewski (Incumbent) | 24,329 | 28.7 | |
| Democratic | Craig Coughlin | 22,226 | 26.3 | |
| Republican | Richard W. Piatkowski | 17,555 | 20.7 | |
| Republican | Peter Kothari | 16,846 | 19.9 | |
| Total votes | | 84,633 | 100.0 | |

=== District 20 ===
2009 New Jersey General Assembly for the 20th Legislative District
| Party | Candidate | Votes | % | ±% |
|---|---|---|---|---|
| Democratic | Joseph Cryan (Incumbent) | 20,607 | 50.7 | |
| Democratic | Annette Quijano (Incumbent) | 20,054 | 49.3 | |
| Total votes | | 40,661 | 100.0 | |

=== District 21 ===
2009 New Jersey General Assembly for the 21st Legislative District
| Party | Candidate | Votes | % | ±% |
|---|---|---|---|---|
| Republican | Nancy Munoz (Incumbent) | 45,515 | 32.5 | |
| Republican | Jon Bramnick (Incumbent) | 45,439 | 32.4 | |
| Democratic | Bruce Bergen | 24,848 | 17.7 | |
| Democratic | Norman Albert | 24,240 | 17.3 | |
| Total votes | | 140,042 | 100.0 | |

=== District 22 ===
2009 New Jersey General Assembly election for the 22nd Legislative District
| Party | Candidate | Votes | % | ±% |
|---|---|---|---|---|
| Democratic | Linda Stender (Incumbent) | 25,379 | 26.9 | |
| Democratic | Jerry Green (Incumbent) | 24,805 | 26.2 | |
| Republican | Martin Marks | 22,718 | 24.0 | |
| Republican | William Vastine | 21,554 | 22.8 | |
| Total votes | | 94,456 | 100.0 | |

=== District 23 ===
2009 New Jersey General Assembly for the 23rd Legislative District
| Party | Candidate | Votes | % | ±% |
|---|---|---|---|---|
| Republican | John DiMaio (Incumbent) | 49,137 | 35.3 | |
| Republican | Erik Peterson | 48,067 | 34.5 | |
| Democratic | William J. Courtney | 21,997 | 15.8 | |
| Democratic | Tammeisha Smith | 19,939 | 14.3 | |
| Total votes | | 139,140 | 100.0 | |

=== District 24 ===
2009 New Jersey General Assembly election for the 24th Legislative District
| Party | Candidate | Votes | % | ±% |
|---|---|---|---|---|
| Republican | Alison Littell McHose (Incumbent) | 50,973 | 43.7 | |
| Republican | Gary R. Chiusano (Incumbent) | 47,741 | 41.0 | |
| Democratic | Frederick J. Katz | 17,781 | 15.3 | |
| Total votes | | 116,495 | 100.0 | |

=== District 25 ===
2009 New Jersey General Assembly election for the 25th Legislative District
| Party | Candidate | Votes | % | ±% |
|---|---|---|---|---|
| Republican | Tony Bucco (incumbent) | 39,150 | 33.0 | |
| Republican | Michael Patrick Carroll (Incumbent) | 38,188 | 32.2 | |
| Democratic | Wendy Wright | 21,431 | 18.0 | |
| Democratic | Rebekah Conroy | 20,010 | 16.8 | |
| Total votes | | 118,779 | 100.0 | |

=== District 26 ===
2009 New Jersey General Assembly election for the 26th Legislative District
| Party | Candidate | Votes | % | ±% |
|---|---|---|---|---|
| Republican | Alex DeCroce (incumbent) | 43,647 | 34.7 | |
| Republican | Jay Webber (incumbent) | 42,077 | 33.4 | |
| Democratic | Wayne B. Marek | 20,107 | 16.0 | |
| Democratic | Douglas Herbert | 20,015 | 15.9 | |
| Total votes | | 125,846 | 100.0 | |

=== District 27 ===
2009 New Jersey General Assembly for the 27th Legislative District
| Party | Candidate | Votes | % | ±% |
|---|---|---|---|---|
| Democratic | John F. McKeon (Incumbent) | 33,013 | 32.8 | |
| Democratic | Mila Jasey (incumbent) | 30,399 | 30.2 | |
| Republican | Mark Meyerowitz | 18,841 | 18.7 | |
| Republican | Barry Funt | 18,409 | 18.3 | |
| Total votes | | 100,662 | 100.0 | |

=== District 28 ===
2009 New Jersey General Assembly for the 28th Legislative District
| Party | Candidate | Votes | % | ±% |
|---|---|---|---|---|
| Democratic | Cleopatra Tucker (Incumbent) | 25,975 | 40.8 | |
| Democratic | Ralph Caputo | 25,172 | 39.5 | |
| Republican | Herbert Glenn | 6,477 | 10.2 | |
| Republican | Andrew Bloschak | 6,053 | 9.5 | |
| Total votes | | 63,677 | 100.0 | |

=== District 29 ===
2009 New Jersey General Assembly for the 29th Legislative District
| Party | Candidate | Votes | % | ±% |
|---|---|---|---|---|
| Democratic | L. Grace Spencer (Incumbent) | 21,205 | 44.1 | |
| Democratic | Alberto Coutinho (incumbent) | 20,628 | 42.9 | |
| Republican | Fernando E. Linhares | 2,787 | 4.8 | |
| Republican | Aracelis Sanabria-Tejada | 2,761 | 5.7 | |
| Hillside and Newark | Joanne Miller | 652 | 1.3 | |
| Total votes | | 48,033 | 100.0 | |

=== District 30 ===
2009 New Jersey General Assembly election for the 30th Legislative District
| Party | Candidate | Votes | % | ±% |
|---|---|---|---|---|
| Republican | Joseph R. Malone, III (incumbent) | 47,325 | 36.6 | |
| Republican | Ronald S. Dancer (incumbent) | 45,901 | 35.5 | |
| Democratic | John Kocubinski | 18,400 | 14.2 | |
| Democratic | William "Bill" Spedding | 17,836 | 13.8 | |
| Write-In | Personal choice | 8 | 0.01 | |
| Total votes | | 129,470 | 100.0 | |

=== District 31 ===
2009 New Jersey General Assembly election for the 31st Legislative District
| Party | Candidate | Votes | % | ±% |
|---|---|---|---|---|
| Democratic | Charles Mainor (Incumbent) | 20,528 | 36.4 | |
| Democratic | Anthony Chiappone (Incumbent) | 20,335 | 36.1 | |
| Republican | Irene Kim Asbury | 6,979 | 12.4 | |
| Republican | Marie Day | 6,795 | 12.0 | |
| Our Future Now | Neil D. Scott | 1,284 | 2.2 | |
| Next Generations Leader | Omar Dyer | 476 | 0.8 | |
| Total votes | | 56,397 | 100.0 | |

=== District 32 ===
2009 New Jersey General Assembly election for the 32nd Legislative District
| Party | Candidate | Votes | % | ±% |
|---|---|---|---|---|
| Democratic | Vincent Prieto (Incumbent) | 23,061 | 48.1 | |
| Democratic | Joan Quigley (Incumbent) | 22,932 | 47.9 | |
| Politicians are Crooks | Herbert H. Shaw | 1,916 | 3.9 | |
| Total votes | | 47,909 | 100.0 | |

=== District 33 ===
2009 New Jersey General Assembly election for the 33rd Legislative District
| Party | Candidate | Votes | % | ±% |
|---|---|---|---|---|
| Democratic | Ruben Ramos (Incumbent) | 24,734 | 37.8 | |
| Democratic | Caridad Rodriguez (Incumbent) | 23,451 | 35.9 | |
| Republican | Beth S. Hamburger | 8,788 | 13.4 | |
| Republican | John Barbadillo | 8,368 | 12.8 | |
| Total votes | | 65,341 | 100.0 | |

=== District 34 ===
2009 New Jersey General Assembly election for the 34th Legislative District
| Party | Candidate | Votes | % | ±% |
|---|---|---|---|---|
| Democratic | Sheila Oliver (Incumbent) | 20,528 | 30.2 | |
| Democratic | Thomas P. Giblin (Incumbent) | 20,335 | 29.9 | |
| Republican | Michael G. Mecca | 12,867 | 18.9 | |
| Republican | Matthew Tyahla | 11,889 | 17.5 | |
| A Better Tomorrow | David L. Taylor | 1,284 | 1.9 | |
| A Better Tomorrow | Clenard H. Childress Jr. | 1,023 | 1.5 | |
| Total votes | | 67,926 | 100.0 | |

=== District 35 ===
2009 New Jersey General Assembly election for the 35th Legislative District
| Party | Candidate | Votes | % | ±% |
|---|---|---|---|---|
| Democratic | Nellie Pou (Incumbent) | 22,148 | 32.4 | |
| Democratic | Elease Evans (Incumbent) | 21,637 | 31.7 | |
| Republican | Lynn Anne Shortway | 12,488 | 18.3 | |
| Republican | George Sawey | 11,993 | 17.6 | |
| Total votes | | 68,266 | 100.0 | |

=== District 36 ===
2009 New Jersey General Assembly election for the 36th Legislative District
| Party | Candidate | Votes | % | ±% |
|---|---|---|---|---|
| Democratic | Frederick Scalera (Incumbent) | 23,353 | 29.5 | |
| Democratic | Gary Schaer (Incumbent) | 22,089 | 27.9 | |
| Republican | Carmen Pio Costa | 17,035 | 21.5 | |
| Republican | Donald Diorio | 16,691 | 21.1 | |
| Total votes | | 79,168 | 100.0 | |

=== District 37 ===
2009 New Jersey General Assembly election for the 37th Legislative District
| Party | Candidate | Votes | % | ±% |
|---|---|---|---|---|
| Democratic | Gordon M. Johnson (Incumbent) | 32,845 | 33.8 | |
| Democratic | Valerie Vainieri Huttle (Incumbent) | 32,440 | 33.4 | |
| Republican | Barry Bellin | 16,266 | 16.7 | |
| Republican | Wojciech Siemaszkiewicz | 15,635 | 16.1 | |
| Total votes | | 97,186 | 100.0 | |

=== District 38 ===
2009 New Jersey General Assembly election for the 38th Legislative District
| Party | Candidate | Votes | % | ±% |
|---|---|---|---|---|
| Democratic | Concetta Wagner (Incumbent) | 28,618 | 27.9 | |
| Democratic | Joan Voss (Incumbent) | 28,078 | 27.4 | |
| Republican | Judith Fisher | 23,132 | 22.5 | |
| Republican | Nicholas Lonzisero | 22,808 | 22.2 | |
| Total votes | | 102,636 | 100.0 | |

=== District 39 ===
2009 New Jersey General Assembly election for the 39th Legislative District
| Party | Candidate | Votes | % | ±% |
|---|---|---|---|---|
| Republican | Charlotte Vandervalk (incumbent) | 44,612 | 33.0 | |
| Republican | Robert Schroeder | 42,477 | 31.5 | |
| Democratic | Michael J. McCarthy | 24,577 | 18.2 | |
| Democratic | John L. Shahdanian, II | 23,356 | 17.3 | |
| Total votes | | 135,022 | 100.0 | |

=== District 40 ===
2009 New Jersey General Assembly election for the 40th Legislative District
| Party | Candidate | Votes | % | ±% |
|---|---|---|---|---|
| Republican | Scott Rumana (incumbent) | 42,359 | 33.2 | |
| Republican | David C. Russo (incumbent) | 42,143 | 33.0 | |
| Democratic | John Agostinelli | 21,737 | 17.0 | |
| Democratic | Mark Bombace | 21,277 | 16.7 | |
| Total votes | | 127,516 | 100.0 | |

== See also ==
- 2009 New Jersey elections
