= Talbot Brewer =

American philosopher

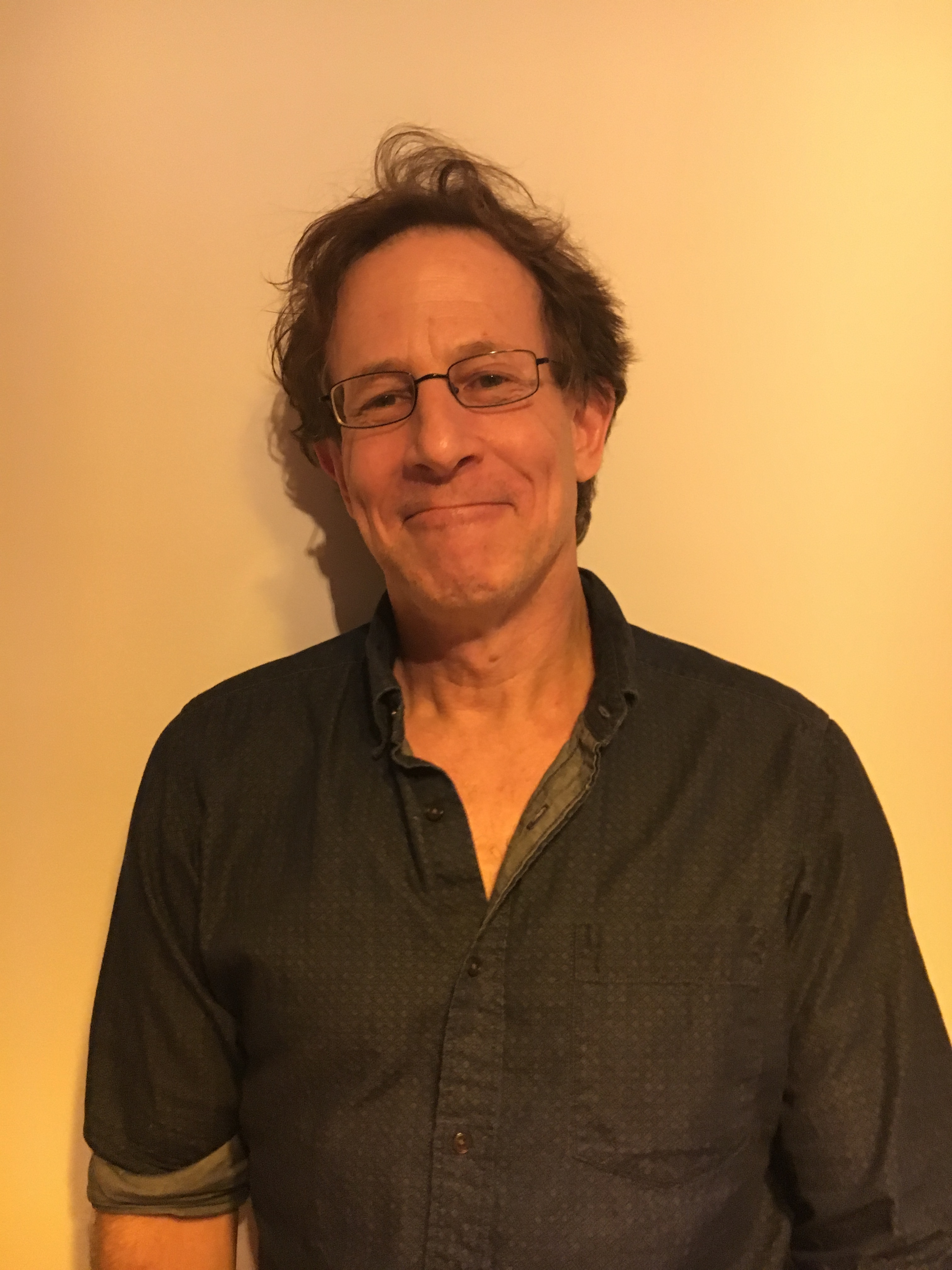

Education
- Education: Harvard University (PhD), Tufts University (MA)
- Thesis: Character, Desire and Moral Commitment (1998)
- Doctoral advisor: Thomas M. Scanlon
- Other advisors: Christine Korsgaard; Stanley Cavell; John Rawls; Fred Neuhouser; Richard Moran

Philosophical work
- Era: 21st-century philosophy
- Region: Western philosophy
- School: Analytic
- Institutions: University of Virginia
- Main interests: ethical theory, moral psychology
- Notable ideas: dialectical activity

Talbot Brewer is an American philosopher and Professor of Philosophy at the University of Virginia. He is known for his works on moral philosophy.

== Philosophy ==
Brewer is known for his idea of "dialectical activity," arguing that contemporary moral philosophy is hindered by a production-oriented conception of human agency and action. He tries to retrieve a different "dialectical" conception of human agency drawing on classical moral philosophy (mainly Aristotle). He believes that our ritual activities show our presence in and to the world. Christopher Cordner provided a criticism of Brewer's idea and argued that this picture of ritual activities is not fully recognised in the dialectical conception of human agency.

Lorraine Besser-Jones argues that Brewer's idea of human agency is incompatible with empirical evidence on motivation and concludes that proposing the good life as a unified dialectical activity is implausible. Mark LeBar describes Brewer's work as saving moral philosophy from "the grip of bad questions and worse answers" and calls it an "ambitious aim."

In her book Aspiration: The Agency of Becoming, Agnes Callard (from the University of Chicago) proposes her aspirational theory of morality and distinguishes it from Brewer's dialectical theory. Jon Garthoff (from the University of Tennessee) proposes a “dynamic approximation” model of virtues based on Brewer’s dialectical idea of virtue acquisition and Rawl's theory of justice. In this model, emphasis and focus on a value gradually enables more engagement with it and more acknowledgement of it. In a paper on teleological hospitality, Melissa Fitzpatrick (from Boston College) provides a critical interpretation of Brewer's work and argues that a crucial component of human flourishing is hospitality towards others. Christopher Bennett (from the University of Sheffield) uses Brewer's idea of dialectical activity to provide an interpretation of Wenders' film Paris, Texas.

== Books ==
- The Retrieval of Ethics, Oxford University Press 2009. The book is in 481 libraries contributing to WorldCat.
- The Bounds of Choice: Unchosen Virtues, Unchosen Commitments, Routledge & Kegan Paul 2000 The book is in 131 libraries contributing to WorldCat.
