= Michael Cholbi =

American philosopher

- Born: 1972 (age 53–54); Portland, Oregon
- Awards: NEH Award, Publons Top Peer Reviewer

Education
- Education: University of Virginia (PhD); Swarthmore College (BA)
- Thesis: Publicity and practical reason: Between subjectivism and Kantianism (1999)
- Doctoral advisor: John Marshall
- Other advisors: A. John Simmons; Talbot Brewer; George Klosko

Philosophical work
- Era: 21st-century philosophy
- Region: Western philosophy
- School: Analytic
- Institutions: University of Edinburgh (2020–); California State Polytechnic University (2003–2020); Brooklyn College (2000–2003)
- Main interests: ethical theory, philosophy of death, philosophy of suicide
- Website: https://michael.cholbi.com/

Michael Cholbi (born 1972) is an American philosopher and Chair in Philosophy at the University of Edinburgh. He is best known for his research on ethical issues related to death and dying, including suicide, grief, and immortality. Cholbi has also published work in moral psychology and Kantian ethics, as well as on topics in practical ethics such as work and labor, punishment, and paternalism.

== Life and career ==
Cholbi was born 1972 in Portland, Oregon. He intended to pursue a career in journalism before being exposed to Enlightenment thought in his first philosophy course. He received his B.A. from Swarthmore College in 1994 and obtained his PhD from the University of Virginia in 1999, completing a dissertation entitled “Publicity and Practical Reason.” After spending three years as an assistant professor at Brooklyn College, City University of New York, he went on to become professor of philosophy and director of the California Center for Ethics and Policy (CCEP) at California State Polytechnic University in Pomona, California. In January 2020, he joined the University of Edinburgh.

Cholbi was previously the editor of the journal Teaching Philosophy and currently serves as an associate editor for Ethical Theory and Moral Practice and on the editorial boards of the Journal of Applied Philosophy and Social Theory and Practice. In 2012, he founded the International Association for the Philosophy of Death and Dying (IAPDD).

Cholbi appeared as a contestant on Jeopardy! in 2007, finishing second.

== Books ==
- Suicide: The Philosophical Dimensions, Broadview, 2011
- Understanding Kant's Ethics, Cambridge University Press, 2016
- Grief: A Philosophical Guide, Princeton University Press, 2021

edited

- Immortality and the Philosophy of Death, Rowman and Littlefield, 2015
- New Directions in the Ethics of Assisted Suicide and Euthanasia. Springer, 2015 (with Jukka Varelius)
- Euthanasia and Assisted Suicide: Global Views on Choosing to End Life. Praeger, 2017
- Procreation, Parenthood, and Educational Rights, Routledge, 2017 (with Jaime Ahlberg)
- The Future of Work, Technology, and Basic Income, Routledge, 2019 (with M.E. Weber)
- The Movement for Black Lives: Philosophical Perspectives, Oxford University Press, 2020 (with B. Hogan, A. Madva, and B. Yost)
- Exploring the Philosophy of Death and Dying: Classic and Contemporary Perspectives, Routledge, 2020 (with T. Timmerman)
