= Anthony R. Bucco =

American politician (1938–2019)

Anthony Bucco

Member of the New Jersey Senate from the 25th district
- In office January 13, 1998 – September 16, 2019
- Preceded by: Gordon MacInnes
- Succeeded by: Tony Bucco

Chair of the New Jersey Senate Republican Conference
- In office January 1, 2019 – September 16, 2019
- Preceded by: Steve Oroho
- Succeeded by: Kristin Corrado

Deputy Minority Leader of the New Jersey Senate
- In office January 8, 2008 – January 12, 2010
- Leader: Tom Kean, Jr.
- Preceded by: Peter A. Inverso
- Succeeded by: Position Abolished

Majority Leader of the New Jersey Senate
- In office January 8, 2002 – January 13, 2004; Co-Leadership with Robert Singer, and Bernard Kenny until January 13, 2004
- Preceded by: John O. Bennett
- Succeeded by: Bernard Kenny

Member of the New Jersey General Assembly from the 25th district
- In office January 23, 1995 – January 13, 1998
- Preceded by: Rodney Frelinghuysen
- Succeeded by: Rick Merkt

Personal details
- Born: February 24, 1938 Boonton, New Jersey, U.S.
- Died: September 16, 2019 (aged 81) Denville, New Jersey, U.S.
- Party: Republican
- Spouse: Helen Jayne (m. 1959)
- Children: Tony Bucco
- Occupation: President of Baker/Titan Adhesives
- Website: Legislative Website; Senate Republican Website

Anthony R. Bucco (February 24, 1938 – September 16, 2019) was an American Republican Party politician who served in the New Jersey Senate from 1998, where he represented the 25th Legislative District until his death. Bucco served as Co-Majority Leader of the New Jersey Senate with Republican Robert Singer and Democrat Bernard Kenny, as Republicans and Democrats each had 20 seats in the chamber. Bucco previously served in the New Jersey General Assembly from 1995 to 1998. His son Tony Bucco was a member of the New Jersey General Assembly and was named to succeed him in the State Senate.

== Personal life ==
Bucco was born on February 24, 1938, and lived in the town of Boonton for most of his life. He served in the U.S. Army Reserve from 1957 until 1965. Bucco later resided in Boonton Township, New Jersey. He married the former Helen Jayne in 1959 and had one son, Anthony Mark.

On February 8, 2019, Bucco was diagnosed with throat cancer and was admitted to the hospital. On September 16, 2019, Bucco died of a heart attack at age 81.

== Morris County politics ==
Bucco served in various local offices before entering the State Legislature. He served on the town of Boonton's Board of Aldermen from 1978 through 1983, served as the town's mayor from 1984 through 1989, and was elected to the Morris County Board of Chosen Freeholders from 1989 through 1992. Bucco also served on the steering committee of the Morris County Economic Development Commission.

== New Jersey General Assembly ==
In the 2009 legislative elections, Anthony was elected to the seat in the General Assembly previously held by his father.

Before entering the Senate, Bucco served in the General Assembly, the lower house of the New Jersey Legislature, from 1995 to 1998, where he served as Assistant Majority Whip from 1996 to 1998. Bucco was first selected by district Republican committee and sworn in January 1995, to fill the remainder of the unexpired term of Rodney P. Frelinghuysen, who resigned his Assembly seat following his election to Congress. During the unexpired term, he served alongside Arthur R. Albohn in the 25th district. In his first Republican primary, Bucco and running mate Michael Patrick Carroll defeated his successor in the Assembly Rick Merkt and then-Freeholder Chris Christie along with two other candidates. Bucco and Carroll were easily elected in the general election and served one full two-year term.

== New Jersey Senate ==
=== Elections ===
In the 1997 Senate election, Bucco defeated one-term incumbent Democratic Senator Gordon MacInnes.

Democrat Rupande Mehta was planning to challenge Bucco for the June 8, 2021 senate primary. Mehta ran in the 2020 special election triggered by Bucco's death.

=== Tenure ===
In the Senate Bucco has served as Assistant Majority Leader from 2000 to 2002, Majority Leader from 2002 to 2004, Leader Assistant Minority Leader from 2006 to 2008, Deputy Minority Leader from 2008 to 2010, Republican Budget Officer from 2010 to 2019; he served as Chair of the Republican Conference at the time of his death.

==== Committees ====
- Health, Human Services, and Senior Citizens
- Labor
- Intergovernmental Relations

== Electoral history ==
=== New Jersey Senate ===
New Jersey general election, 2017
Party	Candidate	Votes	%	±%
Republican	Anthony Bucco (Incumbent)	30,659	52.2	▼34.6
Democratic	Lisa Bhimani	28,131	47.8	N/A
Total votes		'58,790'	'100.0'	

New Jersey State Senate elections, 2013
Party	Candidate	Votes	%
Republican	Anthony Bucco (Incumbent)	36,517	86.8
Independent	Maureen Castriotta	5,577	13.2
Republican hold			

New Jersey State Senate elections, 2011
Party	Candidate	Votes	%
Republican	Anthony Bucco (Incumbent)	19,228	61.0
Democratic	Rick Thoeni	12,298	39.0
Republican hold			

New Jersey State Senate elections, 2007
Party	Candidate	Votes	%
Republican	Anthony Bucco (Incumbent)	23,754	61.5
Democratic	Frank Herbert	14,881	38.5
Republican hold			

New Jersey general election, 2003
Party	Candidate	Votes	%	±%
Republican	Anthony Bucco (Incumbent)	22,163	55.1	▼10.4
Democratic	Blair B. Mac Innes	18,060	44.9	▲10.4
Total votes		'40,223'	'100.0'	

New Jersey general election, 2001
Party	Candidate	Votes	%
Republican	Anthony Bucco (Incumbent)	38,020	65.5
Democratic	Horace Chamberlain	20,017	34.5
Total votes		58,037	100.0

New Jersey general election, 1997
Party	Candidate	Votes	%	±%
Republican	Anthony Bucco	37,048	54.8	▲5.1
Democratic	Gordon MacInnes (Incumbent)	29,515	43.7	▼6.6
Conservative	Joseph Long	1,033	1.5	N/A
Total votes		'67,596'	'100.0'	

=== New Jersey Assembly ===
New Jersey general election, 1995
Party	Candidate	Votes	%	±%
Republican	Anthony Bucco (Incumbent)	21,787	30.8	▼6.1
Republican	Michael Patrick Carroll	20,215	28.6	▼2.6
Democratic	Stephen D. Landfield	12,943	18.3	▲2.0
Democratic	Stanley B. Yablonsky	12,795	18.1	▲3.1
Conservative	Joseph Long	1,495	2.1	N/A
Conservative	Jim Spinosa	1,478	2.1	N/A
Total votes		'70,713'	'100.0'	

New Jersey Senate
Preceded by Gordon MacInnes	Member of the New Jersey Senate from the 25th District; January 13, 1998 – September 16, 2019	Succeeded by Tony Bucco
Political offices
Preceded by John O. Bennett	Majority Leader of the New Jersey Senate; January 8, 2002 - January 13, 2004; With: Robert Singer, Bernard Kenny	Succeeded by Bernard Kenny
New Jersey General Assembly
Preceded by Rodney Frelinghuysen	Member of the New Jersey General Assembly for the 25th District; January 23, 1995 – January 13, 1998; With: Arthur R. Albohn, Michael Patrick Carroll	Succeeded by Rick Merkt
