= For British Eyes Only =

- Arrested Development episode
- Episode no.: Season 3 Episode 2
- Directed by: John Fortenberry
- Written by: Mitchell Hurwitz; Richard Day
- Cinematography by: Greg Harrington
- Editing by: Stuart Bass
- Production code: 3AJD02
- Original air date: September 26, 2005
- Running time: 22 minutes

Guest appearances
- Charlize Theron as Rita; Dave Thomas as Trevor; Justin Grant Wade as Steve Holt; B.W. Gonzalez as Lupe; Harry Hamlin as himself; John Beard as himself

Episode chronology
← Previous "The Cabin Show"	Next → "Forget-Me-Now"
- Arrested Development season 3

"For British Eyes Only" is the second episode of the third season of the American television satirical sitcom Arrested Development. It is the 42nd overall episode of the series, and was written by series creator Mitchell Hurwitz and co-executive producer Richard Day, and directed by John Fortenberry. It originally aired on Fox on September 26, 2005.

The series, narrated by Ron Howard, follows the Bluths, a formerly wealthy, dysfunctional family, who made their money from property development. The Bluth family consists of Michael, his twin sister Lindsay, his older brother Gob, his younger brother Buster, their mother Lucille and father George Sr., as well as Michael's son George Michael, and Lindsay and her husband Tobias' daughter Maeby. In the episode, Michael falls for a British woman named Rita while investigating a claim by George Sr. that a British construction firm tricked him into doing business with the Iraqis.

== Plot ==
After George Sr. (Jeffrey Tambor) pleads to not be sent back to prison, Michael (Jason Bateman) has him placed under house arrest. Michael then tries to get Gob (Will Arnett) to spend more time with his newly discovered son Steve Holt (Justin Grant Wade), while Tobias (David Cross) has painted Gob-like hair on his head with permanent pen to convince Gob that he should be the look-alike for the performance of the illusion. Lindsay (Portia de Rossi) tries convince Michael to buy her a Lexus, and George Sr. explains his plans for his trial to Michael, to which Michael says that he should plead guilty. George Sr. claims that he was set up by British builders in his involvement with building houses in Iraq, and Michael sets off to find evidence.

Michael drives to the British district of Orange County, named 'Wee Britain', to check the records, but is turned down because he is American. Michael enters a pub across the street and meets Rita (Charlize Theron). Upon finding out that she is British, he tries to employ her in order to access the files that would shed light upon his father's involvement in Iraq. He misses gaining access to the files, as the records office works on Greenwich Mean Time, but does arrange a date with Rita. As Michael drives away from Wee Britain, he calls Lindsay to gloat that he has a date but is interrupted by Trevor (Dave Thomas) swerving in a convertible car into the stair car and threatening him. Michael misinterprets the threat, thinking it has to do with the search for information regarding his father instead of it regarding his interaction with Rita.

Back at the Bluth Company office, Gob is conflicted over his feelings about Steve Holt, and Michael starts to believe that he is being set up by George Sr. Michael visits him, who denies doing so, and then goes to cancel his date with Rita at her school. George Sr. tries to convince Gob to include him in his illusion to escape before the trial, while Tobias has had hair plugs implanted in his head to look more like Gob for possible use as his double in the illusion, but his scalp is bleeding horribly from the treatment. As the family arrive at the courthouse for George Sr.'s trial, Gob performs his illusion, where he bonds with Steve Holt over their mutual love for magic. During the confusion, George Sr. tries to escape, but Lucille (Jessica Walter) uses a stun gun to stop him. In court, Michael pleads not guilty on behalf of his father, and Rita turns up at the courthouse. Michael decides to be brave and ask Rita out on another date, even going back for a kiss; however, she then leaves with Trevor.

== Production ==
"For British Eyes Only" was directed by John Fortenberry, and written by series creator Mitchell Hurwitz and Richard Day. It was Hurwitz's 16th writing credit for the series, and Day's first. Originally titled "The British Bombshell" during production, it was the second episode of the season to be filmed.

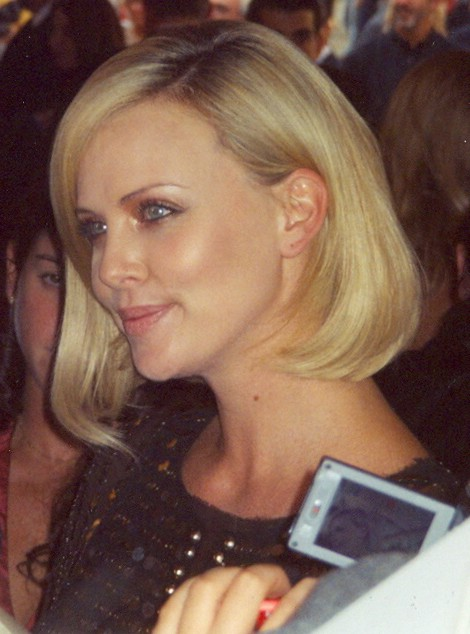
Charlize Theron makes her debut on the series in "For British Eyes Only".

In August of 2005, it was reported that Charlize Theron was signed on to portray a love interest for Michael for five episodes, and was to begin her role on the season's second episode. After her 2005 film Æon Flux was a box office flop, Theron, a self-proclaimed fan of Arrested Development, joined the series to save her career. She recalled feeling anxious about working on a show that was "developed and so brilliant", but enjoyed her time on it. The jingle heard throughout the episode—singing "For British Eyes Only"—was performed by series composer David Schwartz's daughter Lucy Schwartz.

The idea between Rita's character was created to set up for future stories in the series that would also have multi-episode arcs. Series creator Mitchell Hurwitz deliberately created her in such a way that the audience would be oblivious to her "secret", but also subtly foreshadow it. According to Jessica Walter, the chicken dance scene between Gob, Lucille, and George Sr. was not scripted, and there were no directions on how to do the dance. They had to each come up with their own dance, and Walter's first instinct was to flap her arms around, taking note that Lucille might possibly be drunk in the episode while coming up with the dance; adding onto the drunk performance, she added Lucille's "coddle doodle doo" line. To prepare for the scene, Walter practiced her dance in front of her dressing room mirror. In the episode, Michael tells George Sr. that he's "a regular Brad Garrett"; this metatextual joke references Jeffrey Tambor losing an Emmy to Garrett the previous year for Outstanding Supporting Actor in a Comedy Series.

== Reception ==
=== Viewers ===
In the United States, the episode was watched by 4.02 million viewers during its original broadcast on September 26, 2005. It received a 1.4% share among adults between the ages of 18 and 49, meaning that it was seen by 1.4% of all households in that demographic. It marked a decrease in viewership from the previous episode, "The Cabin Show", which had earned a 1.6% rating and drew in 4.62 million viewers.

=== Critical reception ===
The A.V. Club writer Noel Murray said about the episode that his "biggest complaint about "For British Eyes Only" is that is so overstuffed." Brian Tallerico from Vulture ranked the episode 38th out of the whole series, saying that "The parody of British manners is very funny".
