= Anthony M. Bucco =

American Republican Party politician

Anthony Bucco
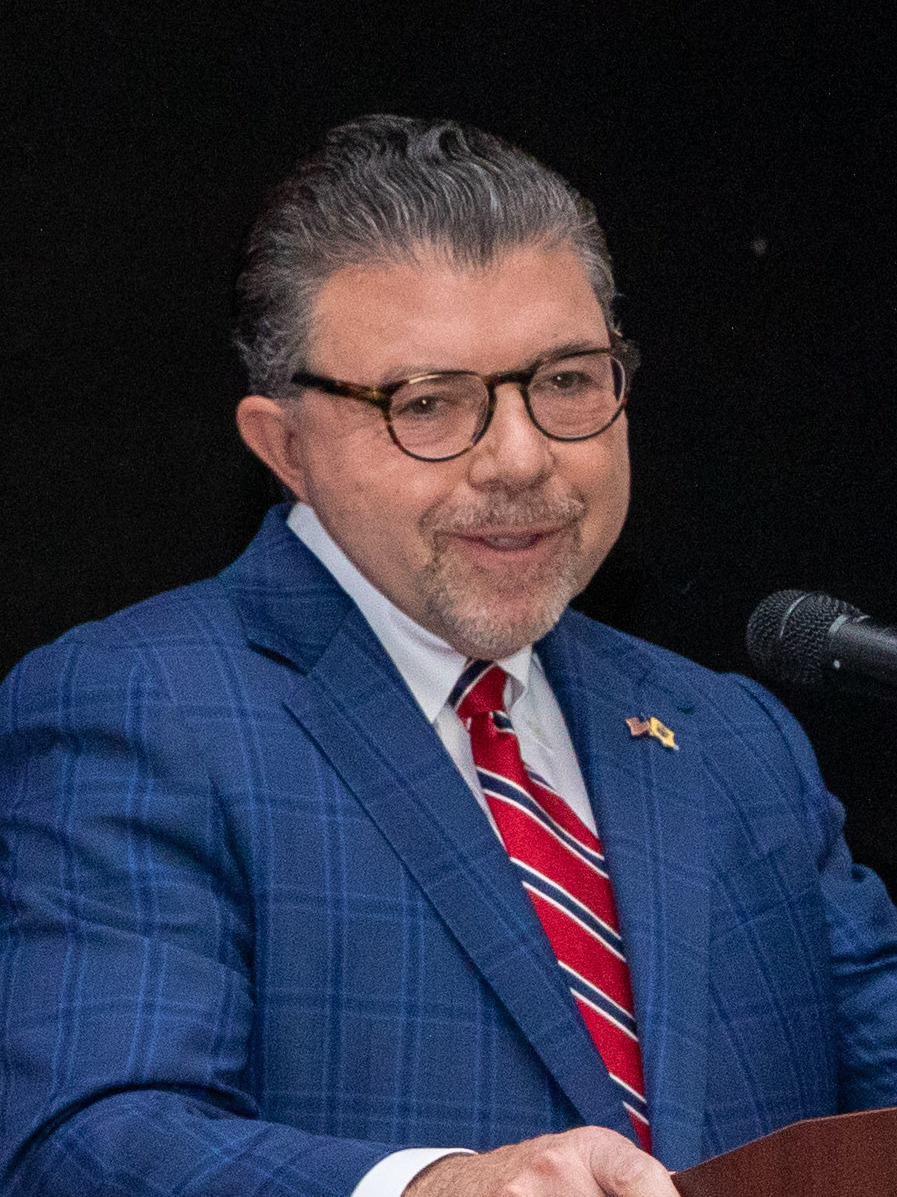
- Bucco in 2025

Minority Leader of the New Jersey Senate
- Incumbent
- Assumed office July 1, 2023
- Preceded by: Steve Oroho

Member of the New Jersey Senate from the 25th district
- Incumbent
- Assumed office October 24, 2019
- Preceded by: Anthony R. Bucco

Member of the New Jersey General Assembly from the 25th district
- In office January 12, 2010 – October 24, 2019
- Preceded by: Rick Merkt
- Succeeded by: Aura K. Dunn

Personal details
- Born: Anthony Mark Bucco; April 12, 1962 (age 64) Boonton, New Jersey, U.S.
- Party: Republican
- Spouse: Amy Bucco
- Children: 6
- Education: Lycoming College (BA); Seton Hall University (JD)
- Website: Legislative website Party website

Anthony Mark Bucco (born April 12, 1962) is an American lawyer and Republican Party politician currently serving as the State Senator for New Jersey's 25th Legislative District. He had been a member of the New Jersey General Assembly since 2010 and was appointed to the State Senate in 2019 following the death of his father, incumbent Senator Anthony R. Bucco.

Bucco serves in the Senate as Republican Leader. On July 1, 2023, he replaced Steve Oroho as Senate Minority Leader.

Bucco is an attorney who currently serves on the Morris County Republican Committee as its general counsel.

== New Jersey General Assembly ==
After Assemblyman Rick Merkt announced that he would run for the Republican nomination for Governor of New Jersey rather than seek re-election in 2009, Bucco announced that he would run for Merkt's seat, which was previously held by his father, Anthony R. Bucco, from 1995 to 1999. Morris County Freeholder Douglas Cabana, the brother of Bucco's wife, Amy also announced his candidacy. Cabana's campaign emphasized his many years in elective office as a Boonton Township Councilman, Boonton Township Mayor, and Freeholder, contrasting this with Bucco's lack of experience in elective office. Bucco countered by accusing Cabana of running a negative campaign, pointing to a Cabana mailer containing "unpleasant photos" of Bucco and "some misinformation." Bucco defeated Cabana by less than 800 votes in the Republican primary. He and running mate Michael Patrick Carroll, a veteran assemblyman, won the general election easily in the heavily Republican 25th district. The two would be reelected in 2011, 2013, 2015, and 2017.

== New Jersey Senate ==
After his father's death on September 16, 2019, Bucco announced his candidacy for the State Senate vacancy while maintaining his campaign for reelection to the Assembly. Bucco was appointed to the Senate in a special convention of 25th district Republican committee members held on October 15, 2019 and subsequently won the Assembly seat for which he was running in the November general election. Bucco declined being seated in the Assembly upon the start of the new term in January 2020, and the district's Republican committee appointed a new Assemblyperson pending a November 2020 special election.

=== Committees ===
Committee assignments for the 2024—2025 Legislative Session are:

- Judiciary

== 25th District ==
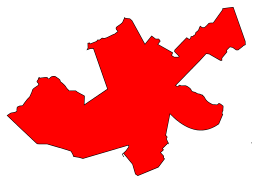
New Jersey's 25th Legislative District (2012-2022 Apportionment)

Each of the 40 districts in the New Jersey Legislature has one representative in the New Jersey Senate and two members in the New Jersey General Assembly. The representatives from the 25th District for the 2026—2027 Legislative Session are:

- Senator Anthony M. Bucco (R)
- Assemblywoman Aura Dunn(R)
- Assemblywoman Marisa Sweeney (D)

== Personal life ==
Bucco attended Boonton High School and earned a bachelor's degree in business administration and managerial economics from Lycoming College. He then graduated from Seton Hall University School of Law and was admitted to the bar. Bucco has spent over twenty years as a municipal attorney in private practice, specializing in local government law. He is currently a partner in the law firm of Murphy and McKeon, P.C. He has been involved in state issues such as the Highlands Act and affordable housing laws by representing municipalities on those issues in court.

== Electoral history ==
=== Senate ===
25th Legislative District General Election, 2023
Party	Candidate	Votes	%
Republican	Anthony M. Bucco (incumbent)	27,250	52.7
Democratic	Christine Clarke	24,491	47.3
Total votes		51,741	100.0
Republican hold			

25th Legislative District general election, 2021
Party	Candidate	Votes	%
Republican	Anthony M. Bucco (incumbent)	43,758	57.47
Democratic	Jeffrey Grayzel	32,381	42.53
Total votes		76,139	100.0
Republican hold			

25th Legislative District special election, 2020
Party	Candidate	Votes	%
Republican	Anthony M. Bucco (incumbent)	67,142	54.0
Democratic	Rupande Mehta	57,192	46.0
Total votes		124,334	100.0
Republican hold			

=== General Assembly ===
25th Legislative District General Election, 2019
Party	Candidate	Votes	%
Republican	Anthony Bucco, Jr. (incumbent)	26,848	27.19%
Republican	Brian Bergen	25,552	25.87%
Democratic	Lisa Bhimani	23,505	23.8%
Democratic	Darcy Draeger	22,850	23.14%
Total votes		98,755	100%
Republican hold			

New Jersey general election, 2017
Party	Candidate	Votes	%	±%
Republican	Michael Patrick Carroll (Incumbent)	30,323	26.2	▼2.0
Republican	Tony Bucco (Incumbent)	30,278	26.1	▼3.4
Democratic	Thomas Moran	27,848	24.0	▲3.2
Democratic	Richard Corcoran	27,386	23.6	▲2.0
Total votes		'115,835'	'100.0'	

New Jersey general election, 2015
Party	Candidate	Votes	%	±%
Republican	Tony Bucco (Incumbent)	13,974	29.5	▼13.5
Republican	Michael Patrick Carroll (Incumbent)	13,372	28.2	▼12.2
Democratic	Richard J. Corcoran III	10,230	21.6	N/A
Democratic	Thomas Moran	9,849	20.8	N/A
Total votes		'47,425'	'100.0'	

New Jersey general election, 2013
Party	Candidate	Votes	%	±%
Republican	Tony Bucco (Incumbent)	35,536	43.0	▲13.5
Republican	Michael Patrick Carroll (Incumbent)	33,393	40.4	▲10.4
Listen, Lead, Succeed	Rebecca Feldman	9,209	11.2	N/A
Principle Before Politics	Jack Curtis	4,426	5.4	N/A
Total votes		'82,564'	'100.0'	

New Jersey general election, 2011
Party	Candidate	Votes	%
Republican	Michael Patrick Carroll (Incumbent)	18,481	30.0
Republican	Tony Bucco (Incumbent)	18,218	29.5
Democratic	Gale Heiss Colucci	12,564	20.4
Democratic	George Stafford	12,432	20.2
Total votes		61,695	100.0

New Jersey general election, 2009
Party	Candidate	Votes	%	±%
Republican	Tony Bucco	39,150	33.0	▲3.3
Republican	Michael Patrick Carroll (Incumbent)	38,188	32.2	▲3.3
Democratic	Wendy Wright	21,431	18.0	▼3.5
Democratic	Rebekah Conroy	20,010	16.8	▼3.1
Total votes		'118,779'	'100.0'	

New Jersey General Assembly
Preceded by Rick Merkt	Member of the New Jersey General Assembly from the 25th district 2010–2019; Served alongside: Michael Patrick Carroll	Succeeded by Aura K. Dunn
New Jersey Senate
Preceded by Anthony R. Bucco	Member of the New Jersey Senate from the 25th district 2019–present	Incumbent
Preceded by Steve Oroho	Minority Leader of the New Jersey Senate; 2023–present	Incumbent
