= The Cabin Show =

- Arrested Development episode
- Michael (right) wakes up to find George Sr. (left) driving the cabin.
- Episode no.: Season 3 Episode 1
- Directed by: Paul Feig
- Written by: Mitchell Hurwitz; Jim Vallely
- Cinematography by: Greg Harrington
- Editing by: Richard Candib
- Production code: 3AJD01
- Original air date: September 19, 2005
- Running time: 22 minutes

Guest appearances
- Henry Winkler as Barry Zuckerkorn; Justin Grant Wade as Steve Holt; Judy Greer as Kitty Sanchez; John Beard as himself; Jim Cramer as himself

Episode chronology
← Previous "Righteous Brothers"	Next → "For British Eyes Only"
- Arrested Development season 3

"The Cabin Show" is the third season premiere of the American television satirical sitcom Arrested Development. Written by series creator Mitchell Hurwitz and Jim Valley, and directed by Paul Feig, it originally aired on the Fox Network in the United States on September 19, 2005.

The series, narrated by Ron Howard, follows the Bluths, a formerly wealthy, dysfunctional family, who made their money from property development. In the episode, several members of the Bluth family make promises to take each other up to their cabin property, which mostly results in them disappointingly going against their word. Concurrently, Michael realizes that Oscar, not George Sr., is serving time in prison, and he sets off to find the latter. Meanwhile, Gob learns his new friend Steve Holt is actually his son, Tobias tries to win Lindsay back, and Lucille attempts to get away from a snoring Buster.

The episode marks the first appearance of Jim Cramer as himself on the series, and the Blue Man Group, who aided with its production, helped David Cross learn how they actually wear their signature blue look, which frustrated him. Upon release, "The Cabin Show" received highly positive reviews from critics, and has called one of the series' best episodes. It has received analysis from both scholars and critics since its airing.

== Plot ==
Michael Bluth (Jason Bateman) is asked by his mother Lucille (Jessica Walter) to let his brother Buster (Tony Hale) stay with him because of his snoring. Michael suggests that she go to their cabin property to rest, as his brother Gob (Will Arnett) walks in, saying that he was not aware of the cabin. Michael recollects that his now-imprisoned father George Sr. (Jeffrey Tambor) repeatedly falsely promised to take him up there, but never did; Michael promises to take Gob. Michael finds his son George Michael (Michael Cera) hiding from his cousin Maeby (Alia Shawkat) in his car after they kissed. He lies about the reason, and Michael also promises to take him up to the cabin; Gob is informed that he can't come.

Michael visits George Sr. in prison, but he finds out that they have accidentally imprisoned Oscar, George Sr.'s twin brother. Gob receives a letter from S.A.D., an organization that reunites sons with their fathers, thinking it is from George Sr., and he goes to meet with him, only to find his—unbeknownst to either of them—son, Steve Holt (Justin Grant Wade) and the two bond, driving to the cabin together. Michael is informed that George Sr. is in Reno, and he goes, telling George Michael that they can't go to the cabin. At a restaurant, Michael finds his brother-in-law Tobias (David Cross) as a waiter, and Michael agrees to help him get his wife Lindsay (Portia de Rossi) back; Michael finds out that George Sr. is hiding with the Blue Man Group. Lindsay, hearing Tobias wants her back, takes George Michael and Maeby with her to Reno.

Michael sees his lawyer Barry Zuckerkorn (Henry Winkler) at a Blue Man Group performance, and he fires him, before finding George Sr. hiding in blue paint. Gob meets with Michael, and is told that he is Steve's father; Gob quickly runs off, abandoning Steve. Michael sees George Michael, and they finally go to the cabin. Lucille drives to the cabin to escape Buster, but she finds him in the backseat hiding from her. Michael and George Michael converse, and agree to wait until the next day to tell the police about Oscar's imprisonment. However, Michael wakes up to find the cabin on top of a truck steered by George Sr. Lindsay sees Tobias kissing Barry in an attempt to get her back, and she requests a divorce.

== Production ==
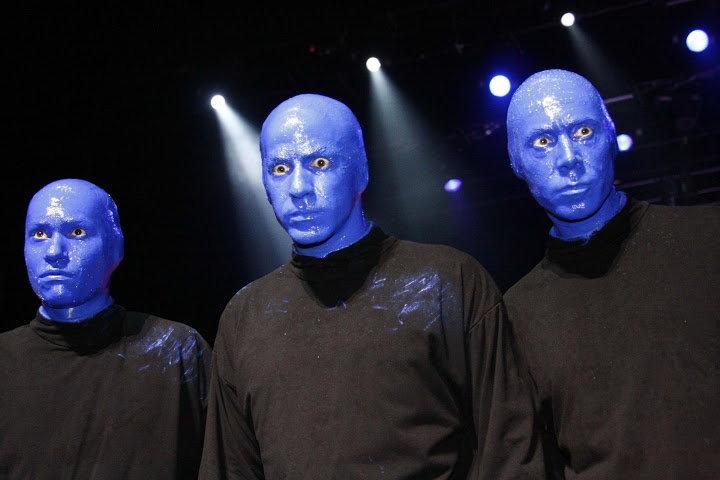
The Blue Man Group assisted with production.

"The Cabin Show" was directed by Paul Feig, and written by series creator Mitchell Hurwitz and Jim Vallely. It was Hurwitz's 15th writing credit, and Vallely's 11th. It was the first episode of the third season to be filmed.

Whenever Arrested Development had done scenes involving the Blue Man Group before, they would paint the actors entirely in blue. However, when filming "The Cabin Show", the group itself, who assisted with production, was confused as to why they did it that way. They revealed that they simply wore face paint with a blue unitard, which David Cross, whose character on the series had a storyline revolving around the Blue Man Group, found to be frustrating, wondering why he wasn't informed of this when he did it. Jim Cramer makes his series debut in the episode, who, alongside a fictionalized version of his investing show Mad Money, reappeared in the season finale. "The Cabin Show" was first released on home video in the United States on August 29, 2006, in the Complete Third Season DVD box set.

== Themes and analysis ==
Author Kristopher Phillips felt the episode raised philosophical concerns regarding the nature of one's identity, as seen by Oscar's identical appearance to his twin brother, George Sr. He argues that it particularly explores a "metaphysical question" of what makes Oscar his own person, and not just a clone of his brother. The episode continues the running gag about Tobias unknowingly being confused on his own gender, rather than his sexuality, which is usually the main joke the series will do with Tobias. The episode explicitly uses misdirection through language to get this across, particularly when Tobias refers to himself as a cocktail waitress. Travis Okulski of Jalopnik asserted that the "falling apart" cabin, in its use throughout season three, was representative of how the Bluths had hit their "lowest points" during this time.

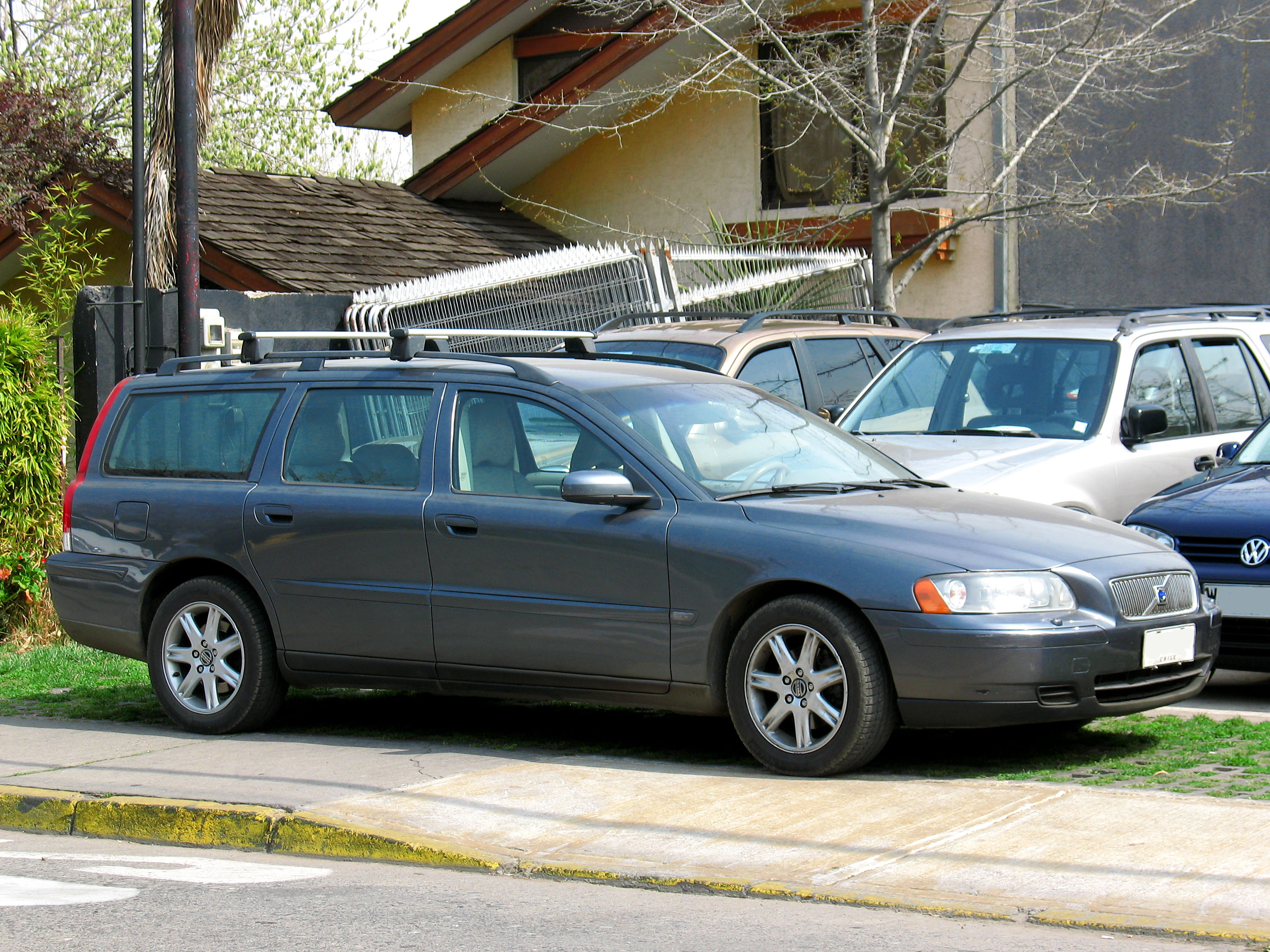
Michael and Lindsay's exchange regarding a Volvo (2005 model pictured) received analysis for its comedic juxtaposition.

"The Cabin Show" makes use of Gob's inability to both notice attention to detail and accept his mistakes, according to author Michael Cholbi, as seen by Gob misunderstanding the letter from S.A.D. while simultaneously being unable to recognize that he is hanging out with his son, Steve Holt. Another running theme of the episode is comedic juxtaposition, and how it is subverted in such a way that the juxtaposition takes on new meaning, according to author Jonah Ford. This is seen when Lindsay asks Michael for a Volvo, and she hands him a photo from the photocopier that she was sitting on, thinking it was a picture of the car. However, Michael, without revealing what the photo is of, asserts that it isn't the car, and, just from his face—and Lindsay's response that the photo came from her sitting on the copier for an extended period of time—the viewer is able to decipher that the photo is of a vulva, without it even being said. It reiterates how "uber-rich" the Bluth family is, and, by extension, proves that the seemingly-nice Michael has as much faults as any other member of the Bluths; according to critic Chad Collins, this includes his misguided attempts to connect with George Michael, which only ends in him further alienating himself from his son.

== Reception ==
=== Viewers ===
In the United States, the episode was watched by 4.62 million viewers during its original broadcast on September 19, 2005. It received a 1.6% share among adults between the ages of 18 and 49, meaning that it was seen by 1.6% of all households in that demographic. It marked a decrease in viewership of over 1 million from the previous episode, "Righteous Brothers", which had earned a 2.2% rating and drew in 5.99 million viewers.

=== Critical reception ===
Yahoo Entertainment's Joe George listed "The Cabin Show" as the 11th greatest episode of Arrested Development, commending Lucille's quip about being depressed by Buster for 32 years, asserting that the "acidic" comedy with the S.A.D. plot proved it to be truly great. It was listed as one of the best television episodes to revolve around Father's Day by Marianne Eloise of Vulture.

The A.V. Club writer Noel Murray commended the episode, describing it as a "reintroduction" episode, but felt it included enough gags that worked in its favor to be a classic episode. Brian Tallerico from Vulture ranked the episode as the eighth best of the whole series, calling it the final episode of Arrested Development's Fox run to be "great". Tallerico praised Michael Cera's delivery of, "It's happening, isn't it?", labeling it as the best line delivery of Cera's career. Rob Owen of the Pittsburgh Post-Gazette praised the episode, commending it for proving the series could continue to be both "self-referential" and serialized even this late into its run.
