= Michael Patrick Carroll =

American politician

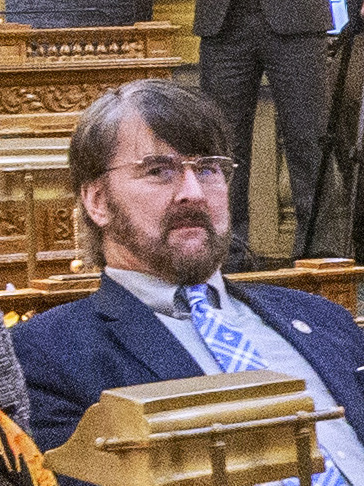

Member of the New Jersey General Assembly from the 25th District
- In office January 9, 1996 – January 14, 2020
- Preceded by: Arthur R. Albohn
- Succeeded by: Brian Bergen

Assembly Minority Parliamentarian
- In office January 10, 2012 – January 14, 2020
- Leader: Jon Bramnick
- Preceded by: James Holzapfel
- Succeeded by: Erik Peterson
- In office January 8, 2002 – January 10, 2006
- Leader: Alex DeCroce
- Succeeded by: Rick Merkt

Personal details
- Born: April 8, 1958 (age 68) Fayetteville, North Carolina, U.S.
- Party: Republican
- Spouse: Sharon Anderson
- Children: Six
- Education: Johns Hopkins University (B.A.); Rutgers School of Law–Newark (J.D.)
- Occupation: Politician, Attorney
- Website: Legislative Website; Assembly Republicans Website

Michael Patrick Carroll (born April 8, 1958) is an American Republican Party politician from New Jersey. He represented the 25th Legislative District in the New Jersey General Assembly from 1996 to 2020. Carroll did not run for re-election in 2019; instead, he mounted an unsuccessful bid for Morris County Surrogate.

== Early life ==
Carroll was born in Fayetteville, North Carolina, on April 8, 1958, the son of Maurice C. and Margaret W. Carroll. Carroll moved with his family to Morris Township, New Jersey in 1960. Carroll graduated from Delbarton School in 1976, earned a B.A. in Social and Behavioral Sciences from Johns Hopkins University in 1980, and received a J.D. from Rutgers School of Law–Newark in 1983.

Carroll founded the Morris County Young Republicans, chairing the group for four years. He was first elected to the Morris County Republican Committee for Morris Township in 1980. In 1984, after moving to Morristown, he was elected to the Republican County Committee there, serving as chairman for one term. Returning to Morris Township, he was once again elected to the Republican County Committee.

== New Jersey Assembly ==
Carroll first ran for the Assembly in 1993; he lost that election by fewer than 422 votes to incumbent Assemblyman Arthur R. Albohn (then-Assemblyman Rodney Frelinghuysen received the most votes in the primary). In 1995, Carroll and Anthony Bucco, who was appointed to the Assembly after Frelinghuysen's election to Congress, prevailed in a Republican primary against Rick Merkt, Chris Christie, and two others in the 25th Legislative District; Carroll and Bucco went on to victory in the fall.

Carroll proposed a bill to mandate the reading, in school each morning, of a section of the Declaration of Independence. The April 2003 issue of New Jersey Monthly magazine cited Carroll as the "Most Conservative" member of the New Jersey Legislature. The magazine cited Carroll's "...missionary zeal and his talent for articulating his stances on behalf of individual and property rights, the sanctity of family—including unborn children—and the cult of Reaganism..." in elaborating on their choice.

Carroll "has long been known in state political circles as one of the most socially conservative, and outspoken, members of the legislature". In 2008, "a comment that Carroll made about slavery" made "national headlines. At the time, the New Jersey legislature was weighing whether the state should issue an official apology for slavery. Carroll opposed the measure, and said that African-Americans should actually be grateful for slavery, because it was the means by which they eventually gained American citizenship".

In November 2010, the "Anti-Bullying Bill of Rights" passed both houses of the state legislature. Carroll was the only legislator to vote "no"; he objected "to the fact that it explicitly mentions categories of students subject to bullying".

== Morris County Surrogate ==
Carroll did not run for re-election to the Assembly in 2019, choosing instead to run for Morris County Surrogate. He was defeated in the Republican primary for Surrogate by Morris County Freeholder Heather Darling.

=== Committees ===
- Higher Education
- Judiciary
- State and Local Government
- Joint Committee on Housing and Affordability

== Personal life ==
In 1983, Carroll married Sharon, née Anderson, whom he met when the two of them worked together at McDonald's. The couple has six children: Sean Michael, James Patrick, Brian Christopher, Jane Eleanor, Benjamin Franklin, and Robert Edward Lee.

== Electoral history ==
=== New Jersey Assembly ===
New Jersey general election, 2017
Party	Candidate	Votes	%	±%
Republican	Michael Patrick Carroll (Incumbent)	30,323	26.2	▼2.0
Republican	Tony Bucco (Incumbent)	30,278	26.1	▼3.4
Democratic	Thomas Moran	27,848	24.0	▲3.2
Democratic	Richard Corcoran	27,386	23.6	▲2.0
Total votes		'115,835'	'100.0'	

New Jersey general election, 2015
Party	Candidate	Votes	%	±%
Republican	Tony Bucco (Incumbent)	13,974	29.5	▼13.5
Republican	Michael Patrick Carroll (Incumbent)	13,372	28.2	▼12.2
Democratic	Richard J. Corcoran III	10,230	21.6	N/A
Democratic	Thomas Moran	9,849	20.8	N/A
Total votes		'47,425'	'100.0'	

New Jersey general election, 2013
Party	Candidate	Votes	%	±%
Republican	Tony Bucco (Incumbent)	35,536	43.0	▲13.5
Republican	Michael Patrick Carroll (Incumbent)	33,393	40.4	▲10.4
Listen, Lead, Succeed	Rebecca Feldman	9,209	11.2	N/A
Principle Before Politics	Jack Curtis	4,426	5.4	N/A
Total votes		'82,564'	'100.0'	

New Jersey general election, 2011
Party	Candidate	Votes	%
Republican	Michael Patrick Carroll (Incumbent)	18,481	30.0
Republican	Tony Bucco (Incumbent)	18,218	29.5
Democratic	Gale Heiss Colucci	12,564	20.4
Democratic	George Stafford	12,432	20.2
Total votes		61,695	100.0

New Jersey general election, 2009
Party	Candidate	Votes	%	±%
Republican	Tony Bucco	39,150	33.0	▲3.3
Republican	Michael Patrick Carroll (Incumbent)	38,188	32.2	▲3.3
Democratic	Wendy Wright	21,431	18.0	▼3.5
Democratic	Rebekah Conroy	20,010	16.8	▼3.1
Total votes		'118,779'	'100.0'	

New Jersey general election, 2007
Party	Candidate	Votes	%	±%
Republican	Rick Merkt (Incumbent)	22,102	29.7	▲1.6
Republican	Michael Patrick Carroll (Incumbent)	21,468	28.9	▲2.1
Democratic	Dana Wefer	16,001	21.5	▼1.1
Democratic	Marshall L. Gates	14,780	19.9	▼2.6
Total votes		'74,351'	'100.0'	

New Jersey general election, 2005
Party	Candidate	Votes	%	±%
Republican	Rick Merkt (Incumbent)	32,089	28.1	▼9.0
Republican	Michael Patrick Carroll (Incumbent)	30,636	26.8	▼10.8
Democratic	Thomas Jackson	25,751	22.6	▼2.8
Democratic	Janice Schindler	25,709	22.5	N/A
Total votes		'114,185'	'100.0'	

New Jersey general election, 2003
Party	Candidate	Votes	%	±%
Republican	Michael Patrick Carroll (Incumbent)	23,841	37.6	▲7.6
Republican	Rick Merkt (Incumbent)	23,525	37.1	▲7.1
Democratic	Thomas A. Zelante	16,094	25.4	▲4.6
Total votes		'63,460'	'100.0'	

New Jersey general election, 2001
Party	Candidate	Votes	%
Republican	Michael Patrick Carroll (Incumbent)	33,426	30.0
Republican	Rick Merkt (Incumbent)	33,414	30.0
Democratic	Ann Huber	23,110	20.8
Democratic	Dick Tighe	21,408	19.2
Total votes		111,358	100.0

New Jersey general election, 1999
Party	Candidate	Votes	%	±%
Republican	Rick Merkt (Incumbent)	17,259	30.5	▼0.2
Republican	Michael Patrick Carroll (Incumbent)	17,204	30.4	▼1.4
Democratic	Ronald J. Pellegrino	10,607	18.7	▲1.1
Democratic	Gerald A. Nunan	10,018	17.7	▲0.1
Conservative	James Spinosa	772	1.4	0.0
Conservative	Stephen Spinosa	750	1.3	▲0.2
Total votes		'56,610'	'100.0'	

New Jersey general election, 1997
Party	Candidate	Votes	%	±%
Republican	Michael Patrick Carroll (Incumbent)	37,935	31.8	▲3.2
Republican	Rick Merkt	36,649	30.7	▼0.1
Democratic	Chris Evangel	20,968	17.6	▼0.7
Democratic	Harriet Lerner	20,967	17.6	▼0.5
Conservative	James Spinosa	1,630	1.4	▼0.7
Conservative	Stephen Spinosa	1,296	1.1	▼1.0
Total votes		'119,445'	'100.0'	

New Jersey general election, 1995
Party	Candidate	Votes	%	±%
Republican	Anthony Bucco (Incumbent)	21,787	30.8	▼6.1
Republican	Michael Patrick Carroll	20,215	28.6	▼2.6
Democratic	Stephen D. Landfield	12,943	18.3	▲2.0
Democratic	Stanley B. Yablonsky	12,795	18.1	▲3.1
Conservative	Joseph Long	1,495	2.1	N/A
Conservative	Jim Spinosa	1,478	2.1	N/A
Total votes		'70,713'	'100.0'	

New Jersey General Assembly
Preceded by Arthur R. Albohn	Member of the New Jersey General Assembly for the 25th District; January 9, 1996 – present With: Anthony Bucco, Rick Merkt, Tony Bucco, Aura K. Dunn	Succeeded by Incumbent
