= Social Theory and Practice =

- Discipline: Philosophy
- Language: English
- Edited by: Mark LeBar, Simon Cabulea May, J. Piers Rawling

Publication details
- History: 1970–present
- Publisher: Dept. of Philosophy, Florida State University (United States)
- Frequency: Quarterly

Standard abbreviations
- ISO 4: Soc. Theory Pract.

Indexing
- ISSN: 0037-802X (print); 2154-123X (web)
- LCCN: 70-617090
- OCLC no.: 830969

Links
- Journal homepage; Online access; Special issues

Social Theory and Practice is a peer-reviewed academic journal that features discussion of theoretical and applied questions in social, political, legal, economic, educational, and moral philosophy, including critical studies of classical and contemporary social philosophers. Established in 1970, it publishes original philosophical work by authors from many disciplines, including the humanities, the social sciences, and the natural sciences. This journal has a Level 1 classification from the Publication Forum of the Federation of Finnish Learned Societies. and a SHERPA/RoMEO "green" self-archiving policy. It is published quarterly by the Florida State University Department of Philosophy, in cooperation with the Philosophy Documentation Center.

== Abstracting and indexing ==
Social Theory and Practice is abstracted and indexed by:

- Academic Search
- Dow Jones Insight
- Expanded Academic ASAP
- Factiva
- FRANCIS
- Humanities Index
- International Bibliography of Book Reviews of Scholarly Literature
- International Bibliography of Periodical Literature
- MEDLINE
- Political Science Complete
- Philosopher's Index
- Philosophy Research Index
- PhilPapers
- ProQuest
- Religion and Philosophy Collection
- Russian Academy of Sciences Bibliographies
- Scopus
- Social Sciences Index
- SocINDEX
- TOC Premier
- Wilson OmniFile

== See also ==
- List of philosophy journals
- List of political science journals
