= John Amodeo =

American television producer

John C. Amodeo
- Occupation: Television producer
- Call sign: NN6JA

John C. Amodeo is an American television line producer, unit production manager, and former editor.

== Career ==
Amodeo produced the situation comedies Ink from 1996 to 1997, Sports Night from 1998 to 1999, and Titus from 2000 to 2002. He later produced Arrested Development from 2004 to 2006 and Samantha Who? from 2007 to 2009.

== Awards ==
In 1985, Amodeo was nominated for a Daytime Emmy Award for Outstanding Achievement in Video Tape Editing for Going Bananas, and was later twice nominated for a Primetime Emmy Award for Outstanding Comedy Series for Arrested Development in 2005, and 2006. He was also nominated for the Producers Guild of America's Television Producer of the Year Award for Arrested Development in 2006, and 2007. Amodeo also helped Tim Allen get his ham radio license in 2014.
