= Lorraine Besser =

American philosopher

- Born: July 29, 1973 (age 53)

Education
- Education: University of North Carolina at Chapel Hill (PhD), Claremont Graduate School (MA), Tulane University (BA)

Philosophical work
- Era: 21st-century philosophy
- Region: Western philosophy
- School: Analytic
- Main interests: ethical theory, moral psychology

Lorraine Besser (born July 29, 1973) is an American philosopher and Professor of Philosophy at Middlebury College. She is known for her works on moral philosophy.

== Books ==
- The Art of the Interesting: What We Miss in Our Pursuit of the Good Life and How to Cultivate It, Balance, Hachette Book Group 2024
- The Philosophy of Happiness: An Interdisciplinary Introduction, Routledge Press 2021
- Eudaimonic Ethics: The Philosophy and Psychology of Living Well, Routledge Press 2014
- The Routledge Companion to Virtue Ethics, Co-edited with Michael Slote, Routledge Press 2015
