= Rick Merkt =

American politician (born 1949)

Richard A. Merkt

Member of the New Jersey General Assembly from the 25th district
- In office January 13, 1998 – January 12, 2010 Serving with Michael Patrick Carroll
- Preceded by: Anthony R. Bucco
- Succeeded by: Tony Bucco

Personal details
- Born: June 30, 1949 (age 77) New York City, U.S.
- Party: Republican
- Spouse: Suzanne
- Children: 3
- Education: Yale University (BA); Fordham University (JD); University of Pennsylvania (MGA)
- Occupation: commercial property manager, private fiduciary

Richard A. Merkt (born July 30, 1949) is an American public official, attorney, and businessman who served from 1998 to 2010 in the New Jersey General Assembly, where he represented the 25th legislative district. In his sixth term as a legislator, he unsuccessfully sought the Republican nomination for Governor of New Jersey in 2009 rather than running for re-election to the Assembly.

Noted for his interest in and knowledge of constitutional issues, Merkt served as the Assembly's Republican Parliamentarian from 2006 to 2010. He served in the Assembly on the Appropriations Committee, the Higher Education Committee, the Judiciary Committee, the Transportation Committee, the Banking and Insurance Committee and the Intergovernmental Relations Commission.

Merkt was appointed New Jersey Deputy Attorney General and served from 1983 until 1986. He was chief administrative officer of the NJ Division of (Casino) Gaming Enforcement during the same period.

Merkt was born in New York City and resides with his wife in Westmoreland, New Hampshire. He graduated with a B.A. in history in 1971 from Yale University, was awarded a J.D. in 1975 from the Fordham University School of Law and received an M.G.A. in 1986 from the University of Pennsylvania in Governmental Administration. He is a certified public manager, founded the Certified Public Manager Society of New Jersey, and received a certificate in public leadership from the Darden School of the University of Virginia in 1998.

From 1986 until 2014, Merkt served as general counsel and officer for three New Jersey corporations, including two high technology manufacturing firms in Morris and Somerset counties.

In March 2011, Merkt was chosen to fill a vacancy on the Mendham Township Committee. Merkt served as deputy mayor of Mendham Township in 2012 and as mayor in 2013. On September 15, 2014, he was appointed Borough Administrator of Mendham, New Jersey and resigned from the Mendham Township Committee. He served as Borough Administrator from November 1, 2014, through September 30, 2017.

After moving to New Hampshire following his retirement, Merkt was elected to the New Hampshire State Republican Committee, a position he held until 2025. In 2019, he became vice chair of the Cheshire County (NH) Republican Committee. In January 2021, Merkt was elected Chair of the Cheshire County Republican party.

In 2020, Merkt ran for a seat in the New Hampshire House of Representatives. He was nominated but lost the election in November 2020.

In January 2021, Merkt joined the founding Board of the Monadnock Freedom to Learn Coalition, the sponsoring organization for Lionheart Classical Academy, a tuition-free public school chartered by the NH State Board of Education in November 2021 and which opened in Peterborough, NH, in August 2022. He served as Secretary to the Board of Trustees for the new academy until May 2024. In 2025, Merkt co-founded the Acta Non Verba ("Deeds, not Words") Classical Education Foundation, a charitable organization established to encourage new and newly-emerging classical schools throughout the United States with a mission of expanding opportunities for classical education for American children. He is currently vice-chair of the Foundation's Board of Trustees.

Merkt served as a New Hampshire Department of Transportation highway layout commissioner in 2023 and 2024. In 2025, he was appointed to serve as a member the New Hampshire Executive Branch Ethics Committee and as a commissioner of the New Hampshire Personnel Appeals Board.

== 2009 gubernatorial campaign ==
On October 22, 2008, Rick Merkt declared his candidacy for the Republican nomination for Governor of New Jersey. However, he was unable to meet the fundraising thresholds necessary to appear in the state-sponsored televised debates before the primary. Thus the primary was in effect a contest between former United States Attorney for the District of New Jersey Chris Christie and former Bogota Mayor Steve Lonegan. Merkt did appear along with his two rivals in two privately sponsored radio debates before the primary, however. While Merkt received about 3% of the vote in the primary, Christie received the gubernatorial nomination. Merkt retired from the Assembly in January 2010 when his sixth term expired.

New Jersey General Assembly
| Preceded by Anthony R. Bucco | Member of the New Jersey General Assembly from the 25th district January 13, 1998–January 12, 2010; Served alongside: Michael Patrick Carroll | Succeeded by Tony Bucco |
