= Mark LeBar =

American philosopher

- Awards: Earhart Foundation Fellowship, NEH Fellowship Panelist

Education
- Education: University of Arizona (PhD)
- Thesis: Virtue Ethics and the Interests of Others (1999)
- Doctoral advisor: Julia Annas

Philosophical work
- Era: 21st-century philosophy
- Region: Western philosophy
- School: Analytic
- Institutions: Florida State University
- Main interests: ethical theory, political philosophy

Mark LeBar is an American philosopher and professor of philosophy at Florida State University. He is known for his works on moral philosophy and is the editor of Social Theory and Practice since 2015.

== Books ==
- Justice (ed.), Oxford University Press 2018
- Equality and Public Policy, edited with Antony Davies, Cambridge University Press 2015
- The Value of Living Well, Oxford University Press 2013
