= Donald Coburn =

Donald Coburn may refer to:

- Donald S. Coburn (1939–2024), American politician and jurist from New Jersey
- D. L. Coburn (Donald Lee Coburn, 1938–2025), American dramatist
