= William E. Bishop =

Former member of the New Jersey General Assembly

Member of the New Jersey General Assembly from the 25th district
- In office May 3, 1982 – January 10, 1984 Serving with Arthur R. Albohn
- Preceded by: James J. Barry Jr.
- Succeeded by: Rodney Frelinghuysen

Personal details
- Born: September 26, 1932 Greeneville, Tennessee
- Died: January 15, 2003 (aged 70) Morristown, New Jersey
- Party: Republican

William E. Bishop (September 26, 1932 – January 15, 2003) was an American Republican Party politician who represented the 25th Legislative District in the New Jersey General Assembly from 1982 to 1984, after taking office in a special election to fill a vacant seat.

== Early life and education ==
Born in Greeneville, Tennessee on September 26, 1932, Bishop graduated in 1950 from Chattanooga High School and served with the United States Navy during the Korean War. He went to college at the University of Tennessee and City College of New York.

== Political career ==
Bishop served from 1976 to 1979 as a councilmember in Rockaway Township, New Jersey and took office as mayor in 1980. He resigned as mayor when he won election to the General Assembly in 1982.

Assemblyman James J. Barry Jr. resigned from office on February 22, 1982, to take a position as Director of the New Jersey Division of Consumer Affairs in the administration of Governor of New Jersey Thomas Kean. Bishop was chosen on the second ballot of a Republican Party special convention. In a special election held in April with fewer than 20% of registered voters casting ballots, Bishop beat the Democratic Party candidate, Rockaway Borough Mayor Bob Johnson, and independent Rosemarie Totaro. He was sworn into office by Justice Stewart G. Pollock on May 3. He cited helping the governor address the "horrendous fiscal picture he inherited" as what he saw as the top priority for the legislature.

Bishop was one of only two members of the Assembly to vote against a proposed ballot referendum that would push a mutual nuclear freeze between the United States and the Soviet Union. Bishop insisted that nuclear arms reduction should only be achieved through talks between the two superpowers and called the proposed ballot initiative a "cop out".

In the June 1983 Republican primary for a full term of office, Bishop lost to Morris County Freeholder Rodney Frelinghuysen and fellow incumbent Arthur R. Albohn, with Frelinghuysen more than two thousand votes ahead of Albohn, who came almost 900 votes in front of Bishop for the two Assembly seats.
