= Arthur R. Albohn =

American politician (1921–2008)

Member of the New Jersey General Assembly
- In office January 8, 1980 – January 9, 1996 Serving with James J. Barry, Jr., William E. Bishop, Rodney Frelinghuysen and Anthony R. Bucco
- Preceded by: Rosemarie Totaro
- Succeeded by: Michael Patrick Carroll
- Constituency: 23rd District (1980–1982); 25th District (1982–1996)

Personal details
- Born: December 27, 1921 Queens, New York City, New York, U.S
- Died: June 29, 2008 (aged 86) Morris Plains, New Jersey, U.S.
- Party: Republican

Arthur Raymond Albohn (December 27, 1921 – June 29, 2008) was an American Republican Party politician who served eight terms in the New Jersey General Assembly, from 1980 to 1996, where he represented the 23rd Legislative District for his first two-year term of office and then served the remainder of his time in office representing the 25th Legislative District.

== Biography ==
Born on December 27, 1921, in Ridgewood, Queens in New York City, Albohn attended Stuyvesant High School. He earned an undergraduate degree from Columbia College, Columbia University in 1942 and then graduated with a Bachelor of Science degree from the Columbia School of Engineering and Applied Science in 1943. During World War II, Albohn moved to Akron, Ohio where he worked for Goodyear Tire and Rubber Company. After moving with his wife to Whippany, New Jersey in 1950, Albohn became involved in local politics and was first elected to serve on the Hanover Township Committee in 1954, serving there until 1987, serving as Chairman of the Sewerage Authority, President of the Board of Health, Director of Finance and as a member of the township's Planning Board. For five of his years on the Township Council he was the Mayor of Hanover Township, New Jersey. Over the years, Albohn worked for Celanese, Rayonier and for Komline Sanderson Engineering.

Albohn was first elected to the General Assembly in 1979 to represent the 23rd Legislative District, defeating Democratic incumbent Rosemarie Totaro. In redistricting following the 1980 United States census, Albohn was relocated to the 25th Legislative District, from which he was elected to seven terms in office. Albohn was one of the sponsors of a recycling bill signed into law by Governor of New Jersey Thomas Kean in 1987 that requires residents to separate recyclable materials from the rest of their household trash. He supported several initiatives aimed at the environment, including open space preservation. In the wake of the North American blizzard of 1996, Albohn was one of the few legislators to make it to Trenton on his own, making sure to be at the State House on his last day of his 16-year tenure as a legislator. He had left his car at the end of his steep driveway and made the 60-mile trip on his own, saying "I can drive a car, as well as a state policeman, although maybe they wouldn't agree with me".

He was inducted to the Elected Officials' Hall of Fame in 2008 by the New Jersey State League of Municipalities. In an executive order signed by Governor of New Jersey Jon Corzine after Albohn's death ordering all flags to be flown at half-staff at all state offices, he was described "a staunch fiscal conservative, earning the nickname “Dr. No” for voting against bills that contained unnecessary spending".

Albohn died on June 29, 2008. He was survived by his wife, Regina, as well as by a daughter, two sons and two grandsons. He was buried at the Whippany Burying Yard in Hanover Township. His wife will be the last person allowed to be buried there.

New Jersey General Assembly
Preceded by Rosemarie Totaro	Member of the New Jersey General Assembly from the 23rd district January 8, 1980–January 12, 1982	Succeeded by Dick Zimmer
Preceded by Jane Burgio	Member of the New Jersey General Assembly from the 25th district January 12, 1982–January 9, 1996	Succeeded by Michael Patrick Carroll
