= New Jersey's 23rd legislative district =

American legislative district

- Senator: Doug Steinhardt (R)
- Assembly members: John DiMaio (R); Erik Peterson (R)
- Registration: 37.34% Republican; 28.90% Democratic; 32.47% unaffiliated
- Demographics: 72.2% White; 4.8% Black/African American; 0.3% Native American; 8.6% Asian; 0.0% Hawaiian/Pacific Islander; 5.7% Other race; 8.4% Two or more races; 13.3% Hispanic
- Population: 222,231
- Voting-age population: 177,008
- Registered voters: 174,110

New Jersey's 23rd legislative district is one of 40 in the New Jersey Legislature. The district includes the Hunterdon County municipalities of Alexandria Township, Bethlehem Township, Bloomsbury, Califon, Franklin Township, Glen Gardner, Hampton, Holland Township, Lebanon Township, Milford, Tewksbury Township and Union Township, the Somerset County municipalities of Bedminster Township, Bound Brook, Bridgewater Township, Manville, Raritan and Somerville, as well as the Warren County municipalities of Alpha, Belvidere, Blairstown Township, Franklin Township, Frelinghuysen Township, Greenwich Township, Hardwick Township, Hope Township, Knowlton Township, Liberty Township, Hackettstown, Harmony Township, Lopatcong Township, Mansfield Township, Oxford Township, Phillipsburg, Pohatcong Township, Washington Borough, Washington Township, and White Township.

== Demographic characteristics ==
As of the 2020 United States census, the district had a population of 222,231, of whom 177,008 (79.7%) were of voting age. The racial makeup of the district was 160,381 (72.2%) White, 10,593 (4.8%) African American, 630 (0.3%) Native American, 19,106 (8.6%) Asian, 56 (0.0%) Pacific Islander, 12,743 (5.7%) from some other race, and 18,722 (8.4%) from two or more races. Hispanic or Latino of any race were 29,551 (13.3%) of the population.

The 23rd district had 174,110 registered voters as of December 1, 2021, of whom 61,978 (35.6%) were registered as unaffiliated, 61,046 (35.1%) were registered as Republicans, 49,004 (28.1%) were registered as Democrats, and 2,082 (1.2%) were registered to other parties.

As of 2000, the district had the largest population of any in the state and the second-highest land area, making it one of the least densely populated districts in the state. The district had a small minority population, with comparatively few African American, Asian and Hispanic residents. The district had the highest municipal tax rate in the state, but lower than average school and county taxes leave the overall rate near the statewide median. Registered Republicans outnumber Democrats by a 2-1 margin.

== Political representation ==
For the 2026–2027 session, the 23rd legislative district of the New Jersey Legislature is represented in the State Senate by Doug Steinhardt (R, Lopatcong Township) and in the General Assembly by John DiMaio (R, Hackettstown) and Erik Peterson (R, Franklin Township).

The legislative district overlaps with 7th and 12th congressional districts.

== Apportionment history ==
Upon the creation of the 40-district legislative map in 1973, the 23rd district consisted of central Morris County including Madison, Morristown, Dover, and Town and Township of Boonton. Following the 1981 redistricting, the 23rd shifted to the rural areas of western New Jersey including the Borough and Township of Hopewell and Pennington in Mercer County, all of Hunterdon County except East Amwell Township, in Warren County Franklin Township, Greenwich Township, and the Borough and Township of Washington, western Morris County, and Stanhope in Sussex County. For the 1991 redistricting following the 1990 census, the district shifted to most of Hunterdon County except for some municipalities in the northern part of the county, all of Warren County, and the Mercer County portion remaining unchanged.

In the 2001 redistricting, the Mercer County municipalities were eliminated from the 23rd with the district only consisting of Hunterdon County save for Tewksbury Township and Califon and all of Warren County. The district experienced a major change following the 2011 redistricting; the 23rd currently consists of southern Warren County including Phillipsburg, Washington, and Hackettstown, most of northern Hunterdon County, and a spur into Somerset County with Bedminster, Peapack-Gladstone, Bridgewater, Raritan Borough, Bound Brook, and South Bound Brook.

Despite the historic Republican nature of Morris County, Democrats swept the three legislative seats up for election in 1973: Stephen B. Wiley, who was also elected in a special election to complete an unexpired Senate term under the old at-large Morris County district, was elected to a four-year Senate term from this district, Gordon MacInnes and Rosemarie Totaro won both Assembly seats as well. MacInnes and Totaro would both be defeated for re-election in 1975 but Totaro would again serve one term in the Assembly after winning in 1977 and MacInnes would later serve four years in the Senate from the geographically similar 25th district in 1993. Governor of New Jersey Brendan Byrne nominated State Senator Wiley to the New Jersey Supreme Court in 1977, his nomination was approved by the Senate, but was rejected by the Supreme Court, which ruled that as Wiley had voted to raise the salary of justices of the Supreme Court in 1974, he could not be appointed to serve on the court until after his term of office expired. Wiley served the remainder of his term in the Senate but was defeated for re-election in 1977 by Republican John H. Dorsey.

After the 1981 redistricting, Senator Walter E. Foran and Assemblyman Karl Weidel, who had been elected from the 14th district in the previous election, became representatives from the 23rd. Following the death of Foran in 1986, Dick Zimmer filled the vacant seat in the Senate and William E. Schluter won Zimmer's Assembly seat, and then continued on to the State Senate after Zimmer succeeded Jim Courter in the United States House of Representatives in 1991. Schluter's Assembly seat was filled by Leonard Lance.

On January 24, 2009, a special election was held by a convention of Republican committee members from Hunterdon and Warren counties to fill the Senate vacancy created when Leonard Lance was elected to Congress. Marcia A. Karrow defeated Michael J. Doherty in the special election by a margin of 195 votes to 143. Doherty announced he would run against Karrow a second time in the June 2009 primary, when she would be running as the incumbent. The Hunterdon and Warren County Republican committee members held another special convention on February 21, 2009 to fill Karrow's vacant Assembly seat. In the contest, Warren County Freeholder John DiMaio defeated Hunterdon County Freeholders Matt Holt and Erik Peterson.

On June 2, 2009, Doherty defeated Karrow in the Republican Senate primary by a margin of 52%-48%, making her the only incumbent to lose a primary battle that year. Doherty went on to win the November special election, defeating Democratic candidate Harvey Baron to fill the remaining two years of the term. Karrow's Senate term ended on November 23, 2009 when Doherty was sworn into office.

Doug Steinhardt took office on December 19, 2022, succeeding Michael J. Doherty, who resigned to take the position as Warren County Surrigate.

== Election history ==
Senators and Assembly members elected from the district are as follows:

Session	Senate	General Assembly	
1974–1975	Stephen B. Wiley (D)	Gordon MacInnes (D)	Rosemarie Totaro (D)
1976–1977	Stephen B. Wiley (D)	James J. Barry Jr. (R)	John H. Dorsey (R)
1978–1979	John H. Dorsey (R)	James J. Barry Jr. (R)	Rosemarie Totaro (D)
1980–1981	John H. Dorsey (R)	James J. Barry Jr. (R)	Arthur R. Albohn (R)
1982–1983	Walter E. Foran (R)	Karl Weidel (R)	Dick Zimmer (R)
1984–1985	Walter E. Foran (R) (Note: Died December 8, 1986)	Karl Weidel (R)	Dick Zimmer (R)
1986–1987	Walter E. Foran (R)	Karl Weidel (R) (Note: Resigned June 13, 1986 to join staff of Department of Insurance)	Dick Zimmer (R) (Note: Elected to the Senate in March 1987 special election, sworn in on April 23, 1987)
1986–1987	Walter E. Foran (R)	C. Richard Kamin (R) (Note: Elected to the Assembly in August 1986 special election, sworn in on September 8, 1986)	Dick Zimmer (R)
1986–1987	Dick Zimmer (R)	C. Richard Kamin (R)	William E. Schluter (R) (Note: Elected to the Assembly in July 1987 special election, sworn in on September 10, 1987)
1988–1989	Dick Zimmer (R) (Note: Resigned January 3, 1991 upon election to Congress)	C. Richard Kamin (R)	William E. Schluter (R)
1990–1991	Dick Zimmer (R)	C. Richard Kamin (R)	William E. Schluter (R) (Note: Appointed to the Senate on January 29, 1991)
1990–1991	William E. Schluter (R)	C. Richard Kamin (R)	Leonard Lance (R) (Note: Appointed to the Assembly on February 21, 1991)
1992–1993	William E. Schluter (R)	Chuck Haytaian (R)	Leonard Lance (R)
1994–1995	William E. Schluter (R)	Chuck Haytaian (R)	Leonard Lance (R)
1996–1997	William E. Schluter (R)	Connie Myers (R)	Leonard Lance (R)
1998–1999	William E. Schluter (R)	Connie Myers (R)	Leonard Lance (R)
2000–2001	William E. Schluter (R)	Connie Myers (R)	Leonard Lance (R)
2002–2003	Leonard Lance (R)	Connie Myers (R)	Michael J. Doherty (R)
2004–2005	Leonard Lance (R)	Connie Myers (R)	Michael J. Doherty (R)
2006–2007	Leonard Lance (R)	Marcia A. Karrow (R)	Michael J. Doherty (R)
2008–2009	Leonard Lance (R) (Note: Resigned January 3, 2009 upon election to Congress)	Marcia A. Karrow (R) (Note: Appointed to the Senate on February 9, 2009, lost June 2009 special primary election, served until November 23, 2009)	Michael J. Doherty (R) (Note: Won Senate seat in November 2009 special election, sworn in on November 23, 2009)
2008–2009	Marcia A. Karrow (R)	John DiMaio (R) (Note: Appointed to the Assembly on March 16, 2009)	Michael J. Doherty (R)
2008–2009	Michael J. Doherty (R)	John DiMaio (R)	Erik Peterson (R) (Note: Appointed to the Assembly on December 7, 2009)
2010–2011	Michael J. Doherty (R)	John DiMaio (R)	Erik Peterson (R)
2012–2013	Michael J. Doherty (R)	John DiMaio (R)	Erik Peterson (R)
2014–2015	Michael J. Doherty (R)	John DiMaio (R)	Erik Peterson (R)
2016–2017	Michael J. Doherty (R)	John DiMaio (R)	Erik Peterson (R)
2018–2019	Michael J. Doherty (R)	John DiMaio (R)	Erik Peterson (R)
2020–2021	Michael J. Doherty (R)	John DiMaio (R)	Erik Peterson (R)
2022–2023	Michael J. Doherty (R) (Note: Resigned November 30, 2022 to become Warren County Surrogate)	John DiMaio (R)	Erik Peterson (R)
2022–2023	Doug Steinhardt (R) (Note: Appointed to the Senate on December 19, 2022)	John DiMaio (R)	Erik Peterson (R)
2024–2025	Doug Steinhardt (R)	John DiMaio (R)	Erik Peterson (R)
2026–2027	Doug Steinhardt (R)	John DiMaio (R)	Erik Peterson (R)

== Election results ==
=== Senate ===
2021 New Jersey general election
Party	Candidate	Votes	%	±%
Republican	Michael J. Doherty	46,554	60.9	▲1.8
Democratic	Denise T. King	29,830	39.1	▼1.8
Total votes		76,384	100.0	

New Jersey general election, 2017
Party	Candidate	Votes	%	±%
Republican	Michael J. Doherty	35,676	59.1	▼8.5
Democratic	Christine Lui Chen	24,730	40.9	▲9.7
Total votes		60,406	100.0	

New Jersey general election, 2013
Party	Candidate	Votes	%	±%
Republican	Michael J. Doherty	37,477	67.6	▲6.3
Democratic	Gerard R. Bowers	17,311	31.2	▼4.5
Seyler. Us	Daniel Z. Seyler	672	1.2	▼1.8
Total votes		55,460	100.0	

2011 New Jersey general election
Party	Candidate	Votes	%
Republican	Michael J. Doherty	21,596	61.3
Democratic	John Graf, Jr.	12,579	35.7
For State Senate	Daniel Z. Seyler	1,040	3.0
Total votes		35,215	100.0

Special election, November 3, 2009
Party	Candidate	Votes	%	±%
Republican	Michael J. Doherty	51,960	71.4	▲4.4
Democratic	Harvey Baron	20,851	28.6	▲1.3
Total votes		72,811	100.0	

2007 New Jersey general election
Party	Candidate	Votes	%	±%
Republican	Leonard Lance	32,198	67.0	▼1.0
Democratic	Harvey Baron	13,124	27.3	▼4.7
For State Senate	Daniel Z. Seyler	2,763	5.7	N/A
Total votes		48,085	100.0	

2003 New Jersey general election
Party	Candidate	Votes	%	±%
Republican	Leonard Lance	29,775	68.0	▼1.3
Democratic	Frederick P. Cook	13,994	32.0	▲1.3
Total votes		43,769	100.0	

2001 New Jersey general election
Party	Candidate	Votes	%
Republican	Leonard Lance	43,721	69.3
Democratic	Frederick P. Cook	19,407	30.7
Total votes		63,128	100.0

1997 New Jersey general election
Party	Candidate	Votes	%	±%
Republican	Bill Schluter	42,221	61.3	▼30.4
Democratic	Austin “Ken” Kutscher, M.D.	23,094	33.5	N/A
Conservative	Michael P. Kelly	2,770	4.0	N/A
Independent	Daniel Z. Seyler	762	1.1	N/A
Total votes		68,847	100.0	

1993 New Jersey general election
Party	Candidate	Votes	%	±%
Republican	Bill Schluter	51,856	91.7	▲19.3
Libertarian	Roger Bacon	4,675	8.3	N/A
Total votes		56,531	100.0	

1991 New Jersey general election
Party	Candidate	Votes	%
Republican	Bill Schluter	34,936	72.4
Democratic	George Goceljak	13,317	27.6
Total votes		48,253	100.0

1987 New Jersey general election
Party	Candidate	Votes	%	±%
Republican	Richard A. Zimmer	27,699	100.0	▲19.1
Total votes		27,699	100.0	

Special election, March 24, 1987
Party	Candidate	Votes	%	±%
Republican	Richard A. Zimmer	5,616	80.9	▲11.7
Democratic	Marianne Nelson	1,327	19.1	▼11.7
Total votes		6,943	100.0	

1983 New Jersey general election
Party	Candidate	Votes	%	±%
Republican	Walter E. Foran	27,224	69.2	▼5.9
Democratic	William Martin, Jr.	12,101	30.8	▲5.9
Total votes		39,325	100.0	

1981 New Jersey general election
Party	Candidate	Votes	%
Republican	Walter E. Foran	37,494	75.1
Democratic	Samuel J. Gugliemini	12,431	24.9
Total votes		49,925	100.0

1977 New Jersey general election
Party	Candidate	Votes	%	±%
Republican	John H. Dorsey	30,882	54.3	▲7.4
Democratic	Stephen B. Wiley	25,981	45.7	▼7.4
Total votes		56,863	100.0	

1973 New Jersey general election
Party	Candidate	Votes	%
Democratic	Stephen B. Wiley	27,303	53.1
Republican	Josephine S. Margetts	24,157	46.9
Total votes		51,460	100.0

=== General Assembly ===
2023 New Jersey general election
Party	Candidate	Votes	%	±%
Republican	John DiMaio	31,122	29.5	▼1.2
Republican	Erik Peterson	30,366	28.8	▼1.1
Democratic	Tyler Powell	22,118	21.0	▲1.1
Democratic	Guy Citron	21,981	20.8	▲1.4
Total votes		105,587	100.0	

2021 New Jersey general election
Party	Candidate	Votes	%	±%
Republican	John DiMaio	46,020	30.7	▲0.5
Republican	Erik Peterson	44,801	29.9	▼0.2
Democratic	Hope Kaufman	29,894	19.9	▼0.1
Democratic	Nicholas F. LaBelle	29,146	19.4	▼0.4
Total votes		149,861	100.0	

2019 New Jersey general election
Party	Candidate	Votes	%	±%
Republican	John DiMaio	28,620	30.2	▲0.8
Republican	Erik Peterson	28,485	30.1	▲2.2
Democratic	Denise T. King	18,910	20.0	▼1.1
Democratic	Marisa Trofimov	18,771	19.8	▲1.0
Total votes		94,786	100.0	

New Jersey general election, 2017
Party	Candidate	Votes	%	±%
Republican	John DiMaio	33,880	29.4	▼3.0
Republican	Erik Peterson	32,233	27.9	▼3.4
Democratic	Laura Shaw	24,386	21.1	▲2.7
Democratic	Charles Boddy	21,690	18.8	▲0.9
End the Corruption	Tyler J. Gran	1,921	1.7	N/A
We Define Tomorrow	Michael Estrada	1,256	1.1	N/A
Total votes		115,366	100.0	

New Jersey general election, 2015
Party	Candidate	Votes	%	±%
Republican	John DiMaio	17,654	32.4	▼1.2
Republican	Erik Peterson	17,071	31.3	▼2.5
Democratic	Maria Rodriguez	10,056	18.4	▲1.5
Democratic	Marybeth Maciag	9,759	17.9	▲2.2
Total votes		54,540	100.0	

New Jersey general election, 2013
Party	Candidate	Votes	%	±%
Republican	Erik Peterson	35,604	33.8	▲2.9
Republican	John DiMaio	35,458	33.6	▲2.4
Democratic	John Valentine	17,828	16.9	▼2.7
Democratic	Ralph Drake	16,548	15.7	▼2.5
Total votes		105,438	100.0	

New Jersey general election, 2011
Party	Candidate	Votes	%
Republican	John DiMaio	21,289	31.2
Republican	Erik Peterson	21,074	30.9
Democratic	Karen Carroll	13,369	19.6
Democratic	Scott McDonald	12,420	18.2
Total votes		68,152	100.0

New Jersey general election, 2009
Party	Candidate	Votes	%	±%
Republican	John DiMaio	49,137	35.3	▲4.3
Republican	Erik Peterson	48,067	34.5	▲3.5
Democratic	William J. Courtney	21,997	15.8	▼3.9
Democratic	Tammeisha Smith	19,939	14.3	▼4.1
Total votes		139,140	100.0	

New Jersey general election, 2007
Party	Candidate	Votes	%	±%
Republican	Marcia A. Karrow	28,904	31.0	▲1.6
Republican	Michael J. Doherty	28,857	31.0	▼0.8
Democratic	Dominick C. Santini Jr.	18,333	19.7	▼1.2
Democratic	Peter G. Maurer	17,119	18.4	▲0.6
Total votes		93,213	100.0	

New Jersey general election, 2005
Party	Candidate	Votes	%	±%
Republican	Michael J. Doherty	41,753	31.8	▲1.5
Republican	Marcia A. Karrow	38,623	29.4	▼1.5
Democratic	Janice L. Kovach	27,485	20.9	▲0.6
Democratic	Scott McDonald	23,387	17.8	▼0.7
Total votes		131,248	100.0	

New Jersey general election, 2003
Party	Candidate	Votes	%	±%
Republican	Connie Myers	26,122	30.9	▼1.5
Republican	Michael J. Doherty	25,554	30.3	▲1.1
Democratic	Brian D. Smith	17,100	20.3	▲3.8
Democratic	Cynthia L. Ege	15,658	18.5	▲2.4
Total votes		84,434	100.0	

New Jersey general election, 2001
Party	Candidate	Votes	%
Republican	Connie Myers	39,313	32.4
Republican	Mike Doherty	35,345	29.2
Democratic	J. Rebecca Goff	19,995	16.5
Democratic	Thomas E. Palmieri	19,454	16.1
Warren/Hunterdon Independent	Mike King	7,060	5.8
Total votes		121,167	100.0

New Jersey general election, 1999
Party	Candidate	Votes	%	±%
Republican	Leonard Lance	27,770	34.4	▲1.7
Republican	Connie Myers	25,499	31.6	▲2.0
Democratic	Thomas E. Palmieri	14,762	18.3	▼1.4
Democratic	J. Rebecca Goff	12,637	15.7	▲0.2
Total votes		80,668	100.0	

New Jersey general election, 1997
Party	Candidate	Votes	%	±%
Republican	Leonard Lance	41,880	32.7	▼0.8
Republican	Connie Myers	37,852	29.6	▼0.1
Democratic	Sharon B. Ransavage	25,237	19.7	▼2.6
Democratic	John Patrick Barnes	19,798	15.5	N/A
Conservative	Paul Wallace	3,242	2.5	▼3.8
Total votes		128,009	100.0	

New Jersey general election, 1995
Party	Candidate	Votes	%	±%
Republican	Leonard Lance	24,134	33.5	▼6.4
Republican	Connie Myers	21,358	29.7	▼11.6
Democratic	Frank C. Van Horn	16,067	22.3	▲3.6
Conservative	Michael Kelly	5,913	8.2	N/A
Conservative	Paul Wallace	4,533	6.3	N/A
Total votes		72,005	100.0	

New Jersey general election, 1993
Party	Candidate	Votes	%	±%
Republican	Garabed “Chuck” Haytaian	47,251	41.3	▲8.5
Republican	Leonard Lance	45,643	39.9	▲9.7
Democratic	Edward F. Dragan	21,425	18.7	▲3.4
Total votes		114,319	100.0	

1991 New Jersey general election
Party	Candidate	Votes	%
Republican	Garabed “Chuck” Haytaian	31,372	32.8
Republican	Leonard Lance	28,879	30.2
Democratic	Rosemarie A. Albanese	14,621	15.3
Democratic	Diane Bowman	12,278	12.8
Citizen Not Politician	Charles D. Meyer	5,163	5.4
Reduce Insurance Rates	Frederick P. Cook	2,373	2.5
Populist	Joseph J. Notarangelo	919	1.0
Total votes		95,605	100.0

1989 New Jersey general election
Party	Candidate	Votes	%	±%
Republican	Bill Schluter	38,345	40.3	▲4.0
Republican	Dick Kamin	36,853	38.7	▲3.2
Democratic	Jane L. Weller	20,032	21.0	▲6.6
Total votes		95,230	100.0	

1987 New Jersey general election
Party	Candidate	Votes	%	±%
Republican	William E. Schluter	23,589	36.3	▼7.7
Republican	Dick Kamin	23,073	35.5	▼6.6
Democratic	Edward J. Boccher	9,344	14.4	▲0.5
Democratic	Frederick J. Katz, Jr.	9,012	13.9	N/A
Total votes		65,018	100.0	

Special election, July 28, 1987
Party	Candidate	Votes	%
Republican	William E. Schluter	2,577	75.2
Democratic	George Murtaugh	848	24.8
Total votes		3,425	100.0

Special election, August 26, 1986
Party	Candidate	Votes	%
Republican	C. Richard Kamin	4,474	57.4
Democratic	Ted Savage	2,957	37.9
Independent	Richard C. Allen	369	4.7
Total votes		7,800	100.0

1985 New Jersey general election
Party	Candidate	Votes	%	±%
Republican	Richard A. Zimmer	34,051	44.0	▲9.4
Republican	Karl Weidel	32,587	42.1	▲7.8
Democratic	Richard C. Allen	10,774	13.9	▼3.3
Total votes		77,412	100.0	

New Jersey general election, 1983
Party	Candidate	Votes	%	±%
Republican	Richard A. Zimmer	26,311	34.6	▲0.1
Republican	Karl Weidel	26,084	34.3	▼1.3
Democratic	Barbara J. MacDonald	13,070	17.2	▲0.1
Democratic	Claiborne L. Northrop	10,523	13.8	▲1.0
Total votes		75,988	100.0	

New Jersey general election, 1981
Party	Candidate	Votes	%
Republican	Karl Weidel	34,588	35.6
Republican	Richard A. Zimmer	33,463	34.5
Democratic	James H. Knox	16,631	17.1
Democratic	Frederick J. Katz, Jr.	12,438	12.8
Total votes		97,120	100.0

New Jersey general election, 1979
Party	Candidate	Votes	%	±%
Republican	James J. Barry, Jr.	24,232	31.5	▲1.5
Republican	Arthur R. Albohn	20,856	27.1	▲3.1
Democratic	Rosemarie Totaro	17,782	23.1	▼3.3
Democratic	Douglas H. Romaine	14,152	18.4	▼1.2
Total votes		77,022	100.0	

New Jersey general election, 1977
Party	Candidate	Votes	%	±%
Republican	James J. Barry, Jr.	32,479	30.0	▲4.4
Democratic	Rosemarie Totaro	28,526	26.4	▲1.4
Republican	Joseph J. Maraziti	25,996	24.0	▼1.6
Democratic	Jerome C. Kessler	21,253	19.6	▼4.2
Total votes		108,254	100.0	

New Jersey general election, 1975
Party	Candidate	Votes	%	±%
Republican	James J. Barry, Jr.	24,770	25.6	▲2.2
Republican	John H. Dorsey	24,734	25.6	▲1.8
Democratic	Rosemarie Totaro	24,160	25.0	▲0.2
Democratic	Gordon A. MacInnes, Jr.	23,058	23.8	▼4.2
Total votes		96,722	100.0	

New Jersey general election, 1973
Party	Candidate	Votes	%
Democratic	Gordon A. MacInnes, Jr.	27,876	28.0
Democratic	Rosemarie Totaro	24,660	24.8
Republican	John H. Dorsey	23,757	23.8
Republican	Albert W. Merck	23,322	23.4
Total votes		99,615	100.0
