= James J. Barry Jr. =

American politician

Director of Consumer Affairs
- In office 1982–1990
- Preceded by: Adam Levin

Member of the New Jersey General Assembly from the 25th district
- In office January 12, 1982 – March 1, 1982 Serving with Arthur R. Albohn
- Preceded by: Jane Burgio; Frederic Remington
- Succeeded by: William E. Bishop

Member of the New Jersey General Assembly from the 23rd district
- In office January 14, 1976 – January 12, 1982 Serving with John H. Dorsey, Rosemarie Totaro, Arthur R. Albohn
- Preceded by: Gordon MacInnes; Rosemarie Totaro
- Succeeded by: Karl Weidel; Dick Zimmer

Personal details
- Born: November 5, 1946 (age 79) Orange, New Jersey, U.S.
- Party: Republican
- Spouse: Leslie Breuninger

James J. Barry Jr. (born November 5, 1946) is an American Republican politician from New Jersey. He is former member of the New Jersey General Assembly and former Director of the New Jersey Division of Consumer Affairs under Governor of New Jersey Thomas Kean.

== Early life and education ==
Barry was born in Orange, New Jersey. He spent the bulk of his childhood growing up at Mount Kemble Lake in the New Vernon section of Harding Township, New Jersey, and attended Harding Township School through eighth grade. Graduating in 1960, he moved on to Morristown High School, where he graduated in 1964.

In 1964, Barry left New Jersey for Kansas City, Missouri to enter Park College (now Park University), in Parkville, Missouri, where he would later be awarded the "Distinguished Alumni Award". He graduated in 1969 with a BA in Sociology.

== Government service ==
Following graduation from college, Barry established the ROBO Car Wash (Morris County Car Wash) in Morristown, New Jersey and Caswell-Massey of Morristown. In 1973, he ran unsuccessfully for the Republican nomination to the State Assembly. Two years later, he won election to the state legislature with the slogan "A Businessman's Approach to Lawmaking." In 1975 he was elected to the General Assembly representing New Jersey's 23rd Legislative District. Barry won re-election to four consecutive terms in office before accepting a gubernatorial appointment in 1982 from the newly elected Governor Thomas Kean to the post of Director of Consumer Affairs, a position previously held by Millicent Fenwick. He served throughout the Kean administration's two terms at which point he left government service and moved to the private sector.

While in the State Assembly, Barry served on the Appropriations Committee, the Joint Appropriations Committee, the Agriculture and Environment Committee and several special committees.

As New Jersey's Director of Consumer Affairs, Barry's accomplishments included implementation of the Automobile Lemon Law and the Plain Language Law, restructuring the Bureau of Securities, winning more than six million dollars for New Jersey consumers in a defective transmission case and the establishment of an auto repair fraud unit. He served a term as President of the National Association of Consumer Agency Administrators and President of the National Coalition for Consumer Education.

== Later life ==
Following positions at CNBC, Strategic Relations and Ned Ward Realtors, Barry moved on to a position as Broker/Manager of the New Vernon office of Weichert, Realtors "Capital Properties & Estates."

In addition to his position at Weichert, Realtors, Barry is a member and former chairman of the Morris County Municipal Utilities Authority (MCMUA), trustee and president of the Washington Association of New Jersey (WANJ) and the longtime president of the Harding Township Republican Club.

Barry sought a return to the State Legislature in 2003 in two separate instances. In February when the local Republican county committees of the 21st Legislative District voted on a replacement for Assemblyman Thomas Kean Jr. who had been appointed to the State Senate, Barry came in second place behind Jon Bramnick in the vote for the remainder of Kean's term in the Assembly. In the regular June primary election, he came in behind incumbents Eric Munoz and Bramnick and two other candidates finishing in last place with 8 percent of the vote.

He has resided in the New Vernon section of Harding Township, New Jersey, with his wife Leslie Breuninger and two children.
