= Jane Burgio =

American politician

Secretary of State of New Jersey
- In office January 19, 1982 – January 16, 1990
- Governor: Thomas Kean
- Preceded by: Donald Lan
- Succeeded by: Joan Haberle

Member of the New Jersey General Assembly from the 25th district
- In office January 8, 1974 – January 12, 1982
- Preceded by: District created
- Succeeded by: Arthur R. Albohn; James J. Barry Jr.

Personal details
- Born: July 8, 1922 Nutley, New Jersey, U.S.
- Died: December 20, 2005 (aged 83)
- Spouse: John Burgio

Jane Grey Burgio (July 8, 1922 – December 20, 2005), an American Republican politician, served as Secretary of State of New Jersey and as a member of the New Jersey General Assembly.

== Early life and education ==
Burgio was born and raised in Nutley, New Jersey. In 1940, she graduated in 1940 from Nutley High School, and later attending Caldwell College and Essex County College. She lived in North Caldwell. Her sister, Ruth Bedford, was also a Republican Party activist. Her brother-in-law, Stanley Bedford, served as a New Jersey Superior Court Judge. Her grandfather, Abraham Blum, was the first Mayor of Nutley.

== Career ==
Burgio served as vice chair of the Essex County Republican Committee and as a Commissioner of the Essex County Board of Elections.

In 1973, after the primary election had already been held, incumbent Assemblyman Philip D. Kaltenbacher announced that he would not run for re-election. Essex County Republicans held a meeting and picked Burgio as his replacement. Burgio's running mate was Thomas Kean. Kean and Burgio defeated their Democratic opponents, Thomas Giblin and Nicholas Saleeby. Kean and Burgio were re-elected in 1975.

Kean gave up his Assembly seat in 1977 to pursue election as governor. Essex County Republican County Chairman Frederic Remington became Burgio's new running mate. They faced a primary and beat Wayne mayor Newton Edward Miller, Norman Lapidus, a businessman from Maplewood, Melvin I. Tolstoi, and Shirley Szabo. In November, Burgio and Remington prevailed over the Democrats, Livingston mayor Donald S. Coburn and Bernie Reiner.

In 1979, Burgio and Remington were re-elected. Alex Trento and James Bildner lost the election. By 1981, James Wallwork gave up his New Jersey Senate seat to become a Republican gubernatorial candidate. Burgio and Remington both wanted to run for the Senate, however, when their shared hometown of North Caldwell was moved into a different district, neither of them ran for anything.

=== New Jersey Secretary of State ===
After Kean was elected Governor of New Jersey in 1981, he asked Burgio to become his Secretary of State, making her the first woman to serve in that role. She accepted and served in that office through the entire eight years of the Kean administration. She retired with Kean in January 1990. In 1996, Burgio attempted a political comeback as a candidate for the position of Surrogate of Essex County, however, lost by a great margin.

== Death ==
Burgio died on December 20, 2005, at age 83. She died in her home in West Caldwell, NJ with no known cause of death noted.

Political offices
Preceded by Donald Lan	Secretary of State of New Jersey; 1990–1992	Succeeded by Joan Haberle
