= Leonard Ronco =

American politician

Leonard D. Ronco

New Jersey General Assembly
- In office January 1958 – January 1960
- Preceded by: Dominic Cundari
- Succeeded by: Leroy D'Aloia

Essex County Prosecutor
- In office 1977–1978
- Preceded by: Joseph P. Lordi
- Succeeded by: Donald S. Coburn

Personal details
- Born: October 30, 1925 Belleville, New Jersey
- Died: June 12, 2010 (aged 84) Hilton Head, South Carolina
- Spouse: Carol-Lee Pierson Ronco
- Education: Seton Hall University Law School

Leonard D. Ronco (October 30, 1925 - June 12, 2010) was an American Democratic Party politician who served in the New Jersey General Assembly, as Essex County Prosecutor, as a New Jersey Superior Court Judge, and as Director of the New Jersey Division of Alcoholic Beverage Control.

== Early life ==
Ronco was born in Belleville, New Jersey on October 30, 1925, the son of Leonard P. Ronco and Sepontina Stango Ronco. He received his law degree from Seton Hall University Law School. From 1943 to 1945, he served in the U.S. Navy and was assigned to the U.S.S. Quincy. He fought at Normandy and was in Tokyo when Japan surrendered to the United States. He served as a Deputy Public Defender in Essex County, New Jersey.

== Political career ==
In 1955, Ronco became a Democratic candidate for the New Jersey General Assembly. While Republicans won all twelve Essex County seats that year, Ronco lost narrowly, just 2,600 votes behind the Republican who finished twelfth; he was the second highest vote-getter among the Democratic candidates. He ran again in 1957, and with Governor Robert B. Meyner at the top of the ticket, Ronco won election as an Assemblyman. He was not a candidate for re-election to a second term in 1959.

Ronco served as the deputy director of the New Jersey Division of Criminal Justice, as the Director of the New Jersey Division of Alcoholic Beverage Control, and as an Assistant Essex County Prosecutor. He later served as Director of the Office of Casino Policy in the administration of Governor Brendan T. Byrne.

He was appointed Essex County Prosecutor by Governor Byrne in 1977.

In 1978, Byrne appointed Ronco to serve as a Superior Court Judge. He served as a Judge until his retirement in 1995.
