= Gordon MacInnes =

American politician (born 1941)

Member of the New Jersey Senate from the 25th district
- In office January 11, 1994 – January 13, 1998
- Preceded by: John H. Dorsey
- Succeeded by: Anthony Bucco

Member of the New Jersey General Assembly from the 23rd district
- In office January 8, 1974 – January 13, 1976 Serving with Rosemarie Totaro
- Preceded by: District created
- Succeeded by: James J. Barry Jr. John H. Dorsey

Personal details
- Born: December 4, 1941 (age 84) Corsicana, Texas, U.S.
- Party: Democratic
- Education: Occidental College (AB); Princeton University (MPA)

Gordon A. MacInnes (born December 4, 1941) is an American Democratic Party politician from New Jersey who has served in both houses of the New Jersey Legislature. MacInnes was elected to the New Jersey General Assembly in 1973 in a heavily Republican Morris County district, as part of the Watergate-driven Democratic landslide of that year. He was defeated in his re-election bid in 1975. In 1993, he won election to the New Jersey Senate in a major upset over incumbent Senate Majority Leader John H. Dorsey, again in a heavily Republican district. He again failed to win re-election in 1997, losing to Republican Anthony Bucco, who continued to hold that Senate seat until his death in 2019.

MacInnes also served as Assistant Commissioner in the New Jersey Department of Education from 2002 to 2007. A resident of Morristown, New Jersey, he was confirmed in 2010 as a member of the Board of Governors of Rutgers University. He also is a former executive director of the New Jersey Network.

MacInnes is the president of New Jersey Policy Perspective, a left-leaning, nonprofit organization that researches and analyzes economic issues. MacInnes is a fellow at the Century Foundation in New York and was a lecturer at the Woodrow Wilson School at Princeton University.

During the administration of President Lyndon B. Johnson, MacInnes was deputy director of the White House Task Force on the Cities.

== Personal life ==
He is married to Blair MacInnes, a philanthropist and former teacher who lives in Morris Township and has served on boards for many civic and charitable organizations. They have three sons and nine grandchildren.
