= Donald S. Coburn =

American lawyer (1939–2024)

Livingston Township Council
- In office January 1975 – March 1978
- Preceded by: John V. Rowley
- Succeeded by: Stephen Geffner

Mayor of Livingston
- In office 1977–1978
- Preceded by: Dominick A. Crincoli
- Succeeded by: Doris L. Beck

Essex County Prosecutor
- In office 1978–1981
- Preceded by: Leonard Ronco
- Succeeded by: George L. Schneider

New Jersey Superior Court & Appellate Division Judge
- In office 1981–2015

Personal details
- Born: Donald Stephen Coburn; April 18, 1939 New York City, New York, U.S.
- Died: August 7, 2024 (aged 85) Worcester, Massachusetts, U.S.
- Party: Democratic
- Spouse: Ellen Jacobs Coburn

Donald Stephen Coburn (April 18, 1939 – August 7, 2024) was an American Democratic Party politician and jurist from New Jersey.

== Early life ==
Coburn was born on April 18, 1939, the son of H. Jules Coburn (1904–1995), a New York attorney. He is a 1961 graduate of Cornell University and received his law degree from the University of Pennsylvania in 1966. He served as a lieutenant in the U.S. Army. From 1966 to 1967, he served as a law clerk to New Jersey Supreme Court Chief Justice Joseph Weintraub. He was an assistant Essex County prosecutor from 1968 to 1969, serving under Prosecutor Brendan Byrne. He served in the administration of Newark mayor Kenneth A. Gibson as an assistant Newark corporation counsel from 1971 to 1974. From 1967 to 1978, he was a partner at Harrison & Jacobs (later Jacobs & Coburn), the firm founded by his father-in-law, Nathan L. Jacobs, who served as an associate justice of the New Jersey Supreme Court from 1948 until his retirement in 1975.

== Political career ==
In 1973, at age 34, Coburn became a candidate for the New Jersey State Senate in the newly drawn 25th legislative district, which included suburban municipalities in western Essex County, as well as some communities in Morris and Passaic counties. The incumbent was two-term Republican James Wallwork. The Essex County Democratic Committee endorsed Roseland Councilman Joel Wasserman for the Senate; Coburn ran in the Democratic primary on a line with Byrne, who was a candidate for governor. Wasserman defeated Coburn by 1,667 votes, 4,144 (62.59%) to 2,477 (37.41%). Wallwork defeated Wasserman in the general election.

Coburn was the Democratic candidate for the Livingston Township Council in 1974. Running with Doris Beck and Dominick Crincoli, the three Democrats defeated two Republican incumbents, Mayor Kenneth Welch and Councilman Peter Cooper, and their running mate, Carl Sulzberger. Coburn, Beck and Crincoli constituted the first Democratic majority on the governing body in township history. Coburn was elected Deputy Mayor in 1976 and was elected Mayor of Livingston in 1977.

In 1977, Coburn was the Democratic nominee for the New Jersey General Assembly, again in the 25th district. Assemblyman Thomas Kean, also of Livingston, was giving up his Assembly seat after five terms to run for governor; he was replaced on the ticket by Essex County Republican chairman Frederic Remington. Coburn lost by 7,330 votes; incumbent Jane Burgio was the top vote getter with 34,859, followed by Remington (30,754), Coburn (23,434) and Bernard Reiner, a history professor at Fairleigh Dickinson University (21,553).

== Essex County prosecutor ==
In 1978, Governor Byrne nominated Coburn to serve as the Essex County Prosecutor. Coburn's confirmation was delayed when Essex County Democratic chairman Harry Lerner, a Byrne foe, opposed him and asked some of the Essex Democratic senators to delay signing off on his nomination. Lerner wanted the current prosecutor, Leonard Ronco to be reappointed. Instead, Byrne made Ronco a Superior Court Judge. Then Byrne appointed Coburn to serve as Deputy Attorney General of New Jersey, followed by Coburn's appointment as the Acting Essex County Prosecutor. This happened while Lerner was vacationing in Florida. Coburn was later confirmed by the state senate, and sworn in by his father-in-law, Justice Jacobs.

== Superior Court judge ==
Byrne nominated Coburn to serve as a judge on the New Jersey Superior Court in 1981. Governor Kean renominated him to a tenured term on the bench in 1988. He sat in Essex County from 1981 to 1996, and was an Appellate Court Judge from 1996 to 2008. He was the Presiding Judge of the Appellate Division from 2005 to 2008. After he turned 70 in 2009, the mandatory retirement age for Judges in New Jersey, Coburn was recalled for two years as an Appellate Court Judge. In 2011, he was recalled as a senior judge of the Superior Court for a term through 2015 and sits in Morris County.

A New Jersey Law Journal review said that Coburn had a "tendency to favor prosecution" and cited his "unpredictability" and "tough demeanor." "The former prosecutor was a fearsome presence for his 15 years in Essex County's Superior Court. In a 1989 Law Journal survey, lawyers gave him the lowest score statewide for his demeanor and sensitivity: 3.2 on a 1-to-10 scale. The next survey, in 1993, put him third-to-last with a score of 3.64." The review said that Coburn was known as "especially bright and hardworking", setting high standards for lawyers. "He's a stickler for formalities and procedures. And though he doesn't necessarily ask more questions than his colleagues, his are usually the toughest."

Coburn was "somewhat of a maverick" trial judge. In 1995, he struck down a law as unconstitutional allowing victim-impact testimony in State v. Muhammad. He was reversed, 4–3, by the New Jersey Suprmeme Court, in 1996. In 1990, he threw out a conviction in State v. Patton in 1990, saying the state failed toturn over narcotics to law enforcement under a law he found violated the privilege against self-incrimination. Three year, later the New Jersey Supreme Court, in a 4–3 vote, upheld the law on the basis that it provided immunity.

The New Jersey Law Journal noted that Coburn limited the reach of the entire controversy doctrine (a doctrine of New Jersey civil procedure that generally makes mandatory all crossclaims and counterclaims related to the same transaction or occurrence as an underlying action) three times: Long v. Lewis ("a state worker who failed to raise discrimination claim before Office of Administrative Law could raise it in Law Division"); Mocci v. Carr Engineering Associates ("party could sue own expert witness after trial"); and B.F. v. Div. of Youth and Family Service, ("doctrine not applicable to termination of parental rights actions"). In 1997, Coburn was part of the Connolly v. Burger King appellate panel that "reversed a ruling that denied a sex-discrimination plaintff access to similar complaints by other employees, finding the discovery relevant to the employer's efforts to combat sexual harassment."

In State v. Allah, his panel in 2000 "affirmed a conviction of a drug defendant in a second trial after the first one ended in a mistrial. He appealed on grounds of double jeopardy and ineffective assistance. Coburn wrote that although the defense counsel waived double jeopardy by not raising it before trial, there was no prejudice because the second trial was fair." The Supreme Court, in a reversal, found "Coburn took too narrow a view of ineffective assistance." In 1999, the high court voted unanimously to reverse Coburn's ruling in State v. Cromedy, where he found no error where a judge "refused to give a jury charge on cross-racial identification in a rape case."

Served as Monterey, Massachusetts, selectman, 2018-2021.

== Family ==
Coburn was married to Ellen Dee Jacobs, the daughter of New Jersey Supreme Court Justice Nathan Jacobs, in 1962. The two met while students at Cornell University. They have two sons.

Coburn died on August 7, 2024, at the age of 85.
