= Weichert, Realtors =

American real estate company

- Company type: Private company
- Industry: Real estate
- Founded: August 25, 1969, Chatham, New Jersey
- Headquarters: 1625 State Route 10 East; Morris Plains, New Jersey 07950
- Key people: Jim Weichert and James Weichert, Jr. (co-presidents)
- Number of employees: ~10,000
- Website: weichert.com

Weichert, Realtors is a residential and commercial real estate franchisor founded in Chatham, New Jersey in 1969. Since 1989, the company has been headquartered in Morris Plains, New Jersey. It is a family-owned and operated business led by co-presidents, founder Jim Weichert and James Weichert Jr., his son.

== History ==
Weichert, Realtors was founded in 1969 in Chatham by Jim Weichert, who sought out prospective customers by handing out business cards at local train stations to people commuting to New York City. In 1983, Weichert expanded operations outside of New Jersey and opened an office in Pennsylvania. In 1989, the company relocated its headquarters to Morris Plains, New Jersey. Expansion continued through 1991 throughout the northeastern United States and later, to other states.

Jim Weichert's son, James Weichert, Jr., became co-president in 2014.

=== Companies ===
Weichert, Realtors comprises 18 real estate and real estate-related companies.

- In 1980, Weichert Financial Services was established to sell finance to real estate customers.
- in 1980, Jim Weichert founded the Weichert Real Estate School. The school is licensed in New Jersey, Pennsylvania, Maryland, Virginia, and the District of Columbia (DC), to provide pre-licensing classes and continuing education to prospective and current real estate professionals.
- In 1982, Weichert Referral Associates was established. The company serves as a network of agents with an active real estate license who direct business to full-time real estate professionals.
- In 2001, Weichert Real Estate Affiliates, Inc. was established expanding the company from a regional to a national real estate network.
- Weichert New Homes
- Weichert Commercial Brokerage focuses on office, industrial, retail, investment, and residential and commercial land brokerage.
- Weichert Lead Network was established.
- In 2002, Weichert began franchising the companies, collectively known as the Weichert Family of Companies.
- In 2018, Weichert re-branded its coordinated homeownership services including real estate, insurance, mortgage and title closing services as All Under One Roof SM. Weichert, Realtors celebrated its 50th anniversary in 2019.

== Gallery ==
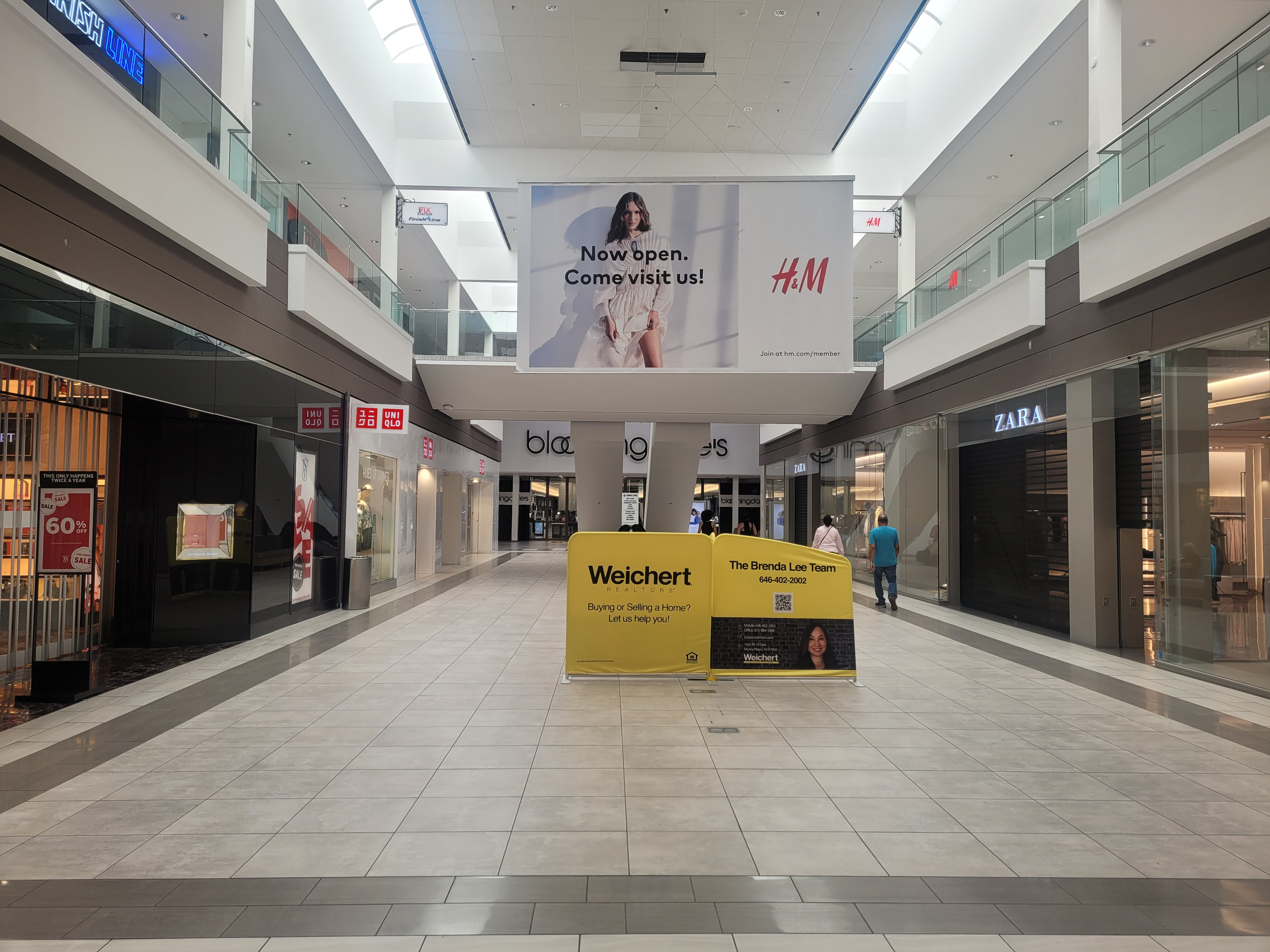
An advertisement for Weichert, Realtors in Wayne, New Jersey's Willowbrook Mall, 2024.
