= Rodney Frelinghuysen =

American politician (born 1946)

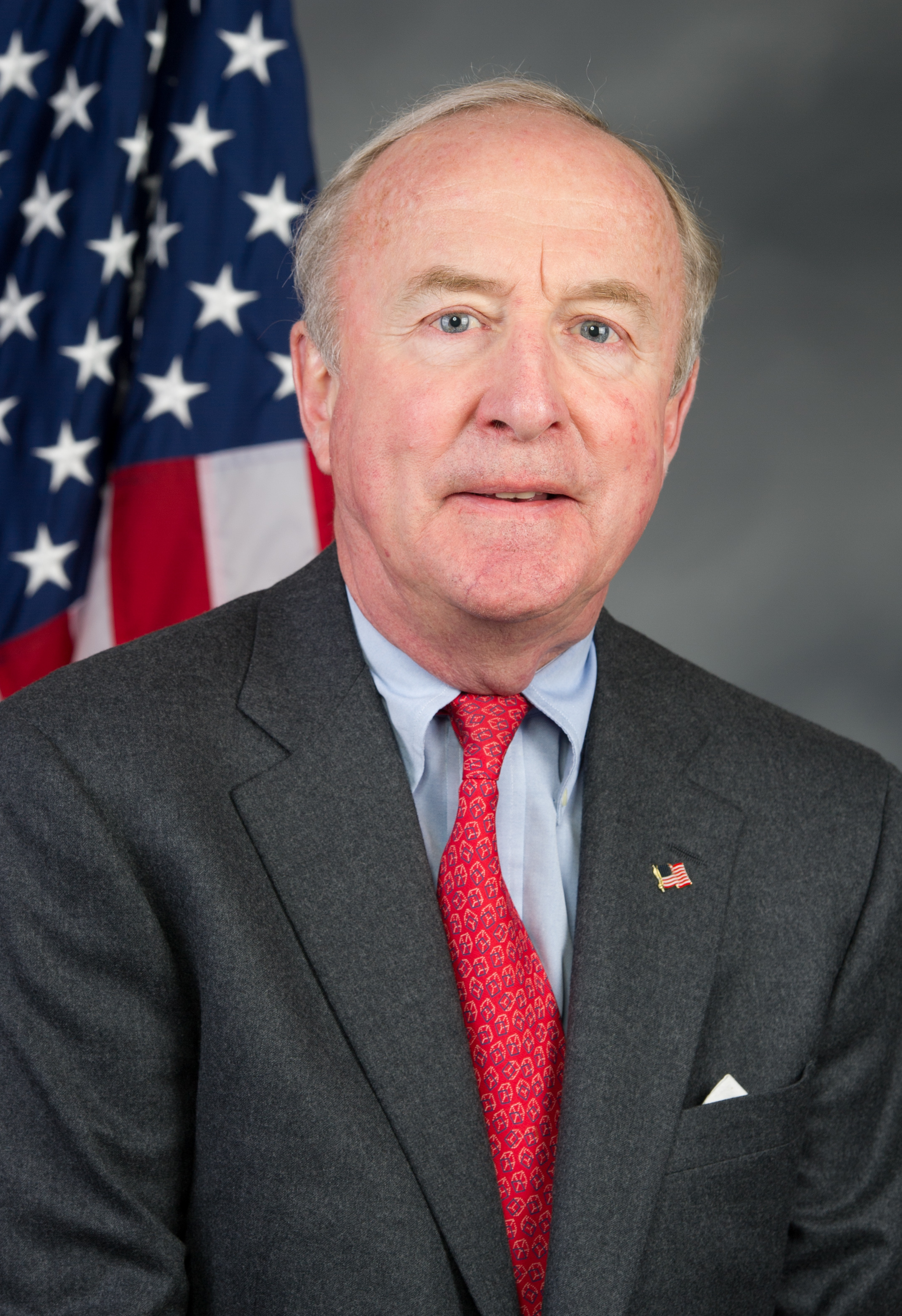
- Official portrait, 2016

Chair of the House Appropriations Committee
- In office January 3, 2017 – January 3, 2019
- Preceded by: Hal Rogers
- Succeeded by: Nita Lowey

Member of the U.S. House of Representatives from New Jersey's 11th district
- In office January 3, 1995 – January 3, 2019
- Preceded by: Dean Gallo
- Succeeded by: Mikie Sherrill

Member of the New Jersey General Assembly from the 25th district
- In office January 10, 1984 – January 3, 1995
- Preceded by: James J. Barry Jr.
- Succeeded by: Anthony Bucco

Personal details
- Born: Rodney Procter Frelinghuysen; April 29, 1946 (age 80) New York City, New York, U.S.
- Party: Republican
- Spouse: Virginia Robinson (m. 1980)
- Children: 2
- Parent: Peter Frelinghuysen Jr. (father)
- Relatives: William Cooper Procter (grandfather); William Procter (great-great-grandfather); Peter Ballantine (great-great-great-grandfather); Frelinghuysen family; Havemeyer family
- Education: Hobart College (BA); Trinity College

Military service
- Branch/service: United States Army
- Years of service: 1969–1971
- Rank: Specialist 5
- Unit: 93rd Engineer Battalion
- Battles/wars: Vietnam War
- Frelinghuysen's voice Frelinghuysen on emergency funding for Hurricane Harvey relief efforts. Recorded September 6, 2017

Rodney Procter Frelinghuysen (/ˈfreɪlɪŋhaɪsən/ FRAY-ling-hy-sən; born April 29, 1946) is an American former politician and lobbyist who served as the U.S. representative for New Jersey's 11th congressional district from 1995 to 2019. The district includes most of Morris County, an affluent suburban county west of New York City. A member of the Republican Party, Frelinghuysen served as chair of the House Appropriations Committee from 2017 to 2019. Frelinghuysen announced on January 29, 2018, that he would not seek re-election that year.

He has at times supported abortion rights and at times voted to limit access to abortion. He opposed federal funding of Planned Parenthood, and opposed sanctuary cities, gun control, gay marriage, and federal regulation of greenhouse gas emissions. He endorsed Donald Trump in the 2016 presidential election. He voted to repeal the Patient Protection and Affordable Care Act (Obamacare) and replace it with the American Health Care Act (AHCA). Frelinghuysen was criticized for using a fundraising letter to "[out] a member of an activist group opposing him to her employer" which resulted in a complaint by the Campaign for Accountability made with the Office of Congressional Ethics.

== Early life and education ==
Frelinghuysen was born in New York City to Peter Frelinghuysen Jr., a New Jersey politician and Beatrice Sterling Procter, an heir to the Procter & Gamble fortune.

Frelinghuysen is a member of a family long prominent in New Jersey politics, one which was ranked the seventh greatest American political dynasty by Stephen H. Hess, senior fellow emeritus at the Brookings Institution, and author of "America's Political Dynasties".

His father, Peter Frelinghuysen Jr., served as the U.S. representative from New Jersey's 5th congressional district from 1953 to 1975, representing much of the same area Rodney did during his time in Congress. On his father's side, he is a great-grandson of American Sugar Refining Company founder Henry Osborne Havemeyer and great-great-great-grandson of Ballantine Brewery founder Peter Ballantine. On his mother's side, he is a great-great-grandson of William Procter, co-founder of Procter & Gamble and grandson of William Cooper Procter, the president of Procter & Gamble from 1907 to 1930.

He attended St. Mark's School, an exclusive Episcopal preparatory school in Southborough, Massachusetts. Rejected by Princeton, the alma mater of his father and grandfather, Frelinghuysen instead matriculated at Hobart College in New York. There, he served as president of the Kappa Alpha Society and earned a Bachelor of Arts degree in American history in 1969.

Frelinghuysen next enrolled in a graduate program at Trinity College but was soon drafted into the United States Army. Following basic training at Fort Dix, he was assigned as a clerk to the commanding officer of the 93rd Engineer Battalion, which was primarily responsible for building roads and water supply systems in the Mekong Delta of Vietnam.

== Local and state political career ==
After his military service, Frelinghuysen was hired by then-Morris County Freeholder Director Dean A. Gallo to be the county's state and federal aid coordinator and administrative assistant. He held this position until 1974, when he was elected as a Morris County Freeholder in his own right. He served three terms on the board, the last as its director.

In 1983, Frelinghuysen was elected to the New Jersey General Assembly, representing the 25th legislative district. Frelinghuysen served in the Assembly until 1994. He was Chairman of the Assembly Appropriations Committee during the 1988–89 legislative session. In 1990 he ran in the Republican primary for New Jersey's 12th congressional district against Dick Zimmer and Phil McConkey.

During the race, the Frelinghuysen campaign "broke ground in high-tech politicking" when it sent voters a seven-minute video cassette of Frelinghuysen. The video, which contained photographs of Frelinghuysen in Vietnam and praise from former Gov. Tom Kean, served as a preemptive tactic against opponents' attempts to characterize Frelinghuysen as "an irrelevant debutante". Frelinghuysen finished in third place.

== U.S. House of Representatives ==
=== Elections ===
In late August 1994, U.S. Congressman Dean Gallo, the six-term Republican incumbent of New Jersey's Eleventh Congressional District, announced his intention to withdraw from the upcoming election for medical reasons (he had recently been diagnosed with terminal prostate cancer and died two days before the election). As Gallo had already defeated three opponents in a hard-fought primary the previous June, his withdrawal triggered a convention of Republican committee members from the district's municipalities. Frelinghuysen, who had been Gallo's former employee and fellow Morris County freeholder and state assemblyman, sought the committee's nomination at Gallo's request, and was chosen to be the Republican nominee for the district.

Frelinghuysen went on to defeat former Democratic State Senator Frank Herbert 71% to 28% in the November 1994 election. However, the 11th had long been one of the most Republican districts in the Northeast, and Frelinghuysen had effectively clinched a seat in Congress by winning the Republican nomination. He was reelected nine times with no substantive opposition, never dropping below 59% of the vote. He has been challenged in the Republican primary three times: in 2008, 2010, and 2014. In 2008, he defeated Kate Erber in the June primary 87% to 13%. In 2010, he defeated Richard Luzzi 76% to 24%. In 2014, he defeated Rick Van Glahn 67% to 33%. This came even as his district was made slightly friendlier to Democrats on paper after the 2010 census, when it absorbed slices of heavily Democratic Montclair, Bloomfield and West Orange. However, Frelinghuysen still had little trouble winning reelection. In addition to his district being located in the New York City market, he was helped by his seat on the Appropriations Committee. He was a chairman of the Appropriations Subcommittee on Energy and Water Development from 2011 to 2017 before becoming chairman of the full committee in 2017. Appropriations subcommittee chairmen are nicknamed "Cardinals" for their influence over the budget. It has long been considered very difficult to unseat an Appropriations Committee member at an election, especially if he or she is a "Cardinal."

In 2000, progressive activist filmmaker Michael Moore attempted to have a ficus challenge Frelinghuysen's unopposed re-election to make the point that most Members of Congress "run unopposed in their primaries and 95% are re-elected every time in the general election", adding "we think it's time to point out to the Frelinghuysen family that we live in a democracy, not a dynasty."

The top sectors supporting Frelinghuysen's campaigns have been the aerospace, defense, pharmaceutical and health care industries.

On January 29, 2018 Frelinghuysen announced that he wouldn't run for another term in 2018.

=== Committee assignments ===
- Committee on Appropriations (Chair)
  - As chair of the full committee, Frelinghuysen was entitled to sit as an ex officio member of all subcommittees

=== Coalitions and caucuses ===
- Republican Main Street Partnership
- Republican Majority For Choice
- Republicans for Choice
- Republicans For Environmental Protection

==== Legislative record ====
Since the start of his congressional tenure in 1995, Frelinghuysen had been the chief sponsor of 123 bills. Of these, four have become law:

- H.R. 1366 (104th): To authorize the extension of time limitation for the FERC-issued hydroelectric license for the Mount Hope Waterpower Project.
- H.R. 459 (106th): To extend the deadline under the Federal Power Act for FERC Project No. 9401, the Mount Hope Waterpower Project.
- H.R. 1964 (108th): Highlands Conservation Act
- H.R. 4850 (108th): District of Columbia Appropriations Act, 2005

He had been the chief sponsor of nine resolutions, none of which passed. He introduced an amendment to the Disaster Relief Appropriations Act, 2013, the initial Hurricane Sandy relief legislation, which added $33.7 billion to the $17 billion initially allocated by the act. The amendment passed the House in a 228–192 vote, with the support of 38 Republicans and 190 Democrats. The amended act was not significantly modified by the Senate, and was signed into law.

== Political positions ==
As of January 2018, Frelinghuysen had voted with his party in 95.4% of votes during the 115th United States Congress and voted in line with President Trump's position in 90.2% of the votes. From the start of his tenure in the 104th Congress to the current 113th, Frelinghuysen has voted with his party 90% of the time.

Frelinghuysen's voting record has been described as moderate. He was a member of the Republican Main Street Partnership. During the 2012 election season, Frelinghuysen rejected claims from Planned Parenthood leaders and progressive activists that he "toes the line of Republican leadership" and had aligned himself with the Tea Party movement.

As Frelinghuysen had been less conservative than many members of the Republican caucus, he was elevated to the Appropriations Committee chairship only based on his assurance to the conservatives that he would be willing to set aside his personal views to implement party policy. One conservative on the committee, Representative Robert Aderholt, said, "One of the things we had discussed going into this, when he wanted to take the chairmanship, was that at the end of the day he understood that when he was negotiating these bills he'd be negotiating on behalf of his conference, as opposed to his own philosophy."

In a tele-townhall on March 20, 2017, he stated that was "not sold" on attempts to repeal and replace the Affordable Care Act (also known as Obamacare) and had not seen any evidence to support claims that President Trump was wiretapped during the campaign. He believes Trump should release his tax returns, but does not support attempts to compel their release, adding "I need to support the Chair's ruling regardless of what the issue is."

=== Abortion ===
Frelinghuysen was a member of Republican Majority For Choice and Republicans for Choice. In 2017, he voted against the Pain-Capable Unborn Child Protection Act, which would have implemented a national ban on abortions performed after 20 weeks of gestation.

From 2010 to 2012, his NARAL rating averaged 7%. He and fellow New Jersey Republican Leonard Lance were singled out by NARAL President Nancy Keenan over their support of H.R. 3 "No Taxpayer Funding for Abortions Act". Frelinghuysen voted in 2015 to strip all federal funding from Planned Parenthood, despite having opposed similar measures in 2011, 2009 and 2007. He cited the Planned Parenthood 2015 undercover videos controversy for his change in position.

=== Economy and budget ===
In October 2017, Frelinghuysen was the only representative from New Jersey to vote in favor of a Republican budget resolution that would increase the federal deficit by $1.5 trillion. He said he voted "for the budget resolution to get my appropriations bills done" and that he would "evaluate tax reform when I see the details." In December 2017, Frelinghuysen voted against the Tax Cuts and Jobs Act of 2017.

Frelinghuysen was a supporter of earmarking, calling the practice a "constitutional responsibility." He consistently ranks in the top 5% in terms of dollars procured. In fiscal year 2008 he ranked 21st, sponsoring or co-sponsoring 44 earmarks totaling $88 million; in fiscal year 2009 he ranked 12th, with 45 earmarks totaling $119 million; and in fiscal year 2010 he ranked 21st with 39 earmarks totaling $76 million. During the same period, Frelinghuysen was the top earmarker among New Jersey lawmakers. The majority of his earmarks were for defense-related expenses.

=== Environment ===
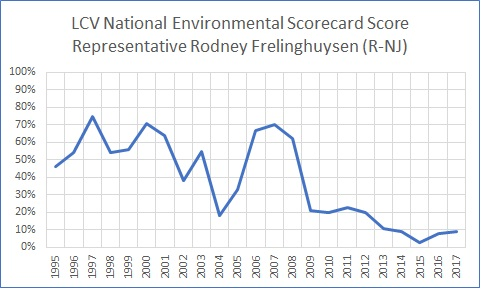
Annual LCV ratings for Rodney Frelinghuysen

Frelinghuysen's environmental position, as measured by the League of Conservation Voters annual "Environmental National Scorecard", was largely centrist from 1995 to 2008, averaging 55%. Beginning in 2009, his environmental record veered sharply negative, averaging just 14% over the next nine years, through 2017. In 2017 Frelinghuysen was given a rating of 9%, the lowest of any New Jersey congressional representative. As of 2017, Frelinghuysen's lifetime LCV Scorecard score was 33%.

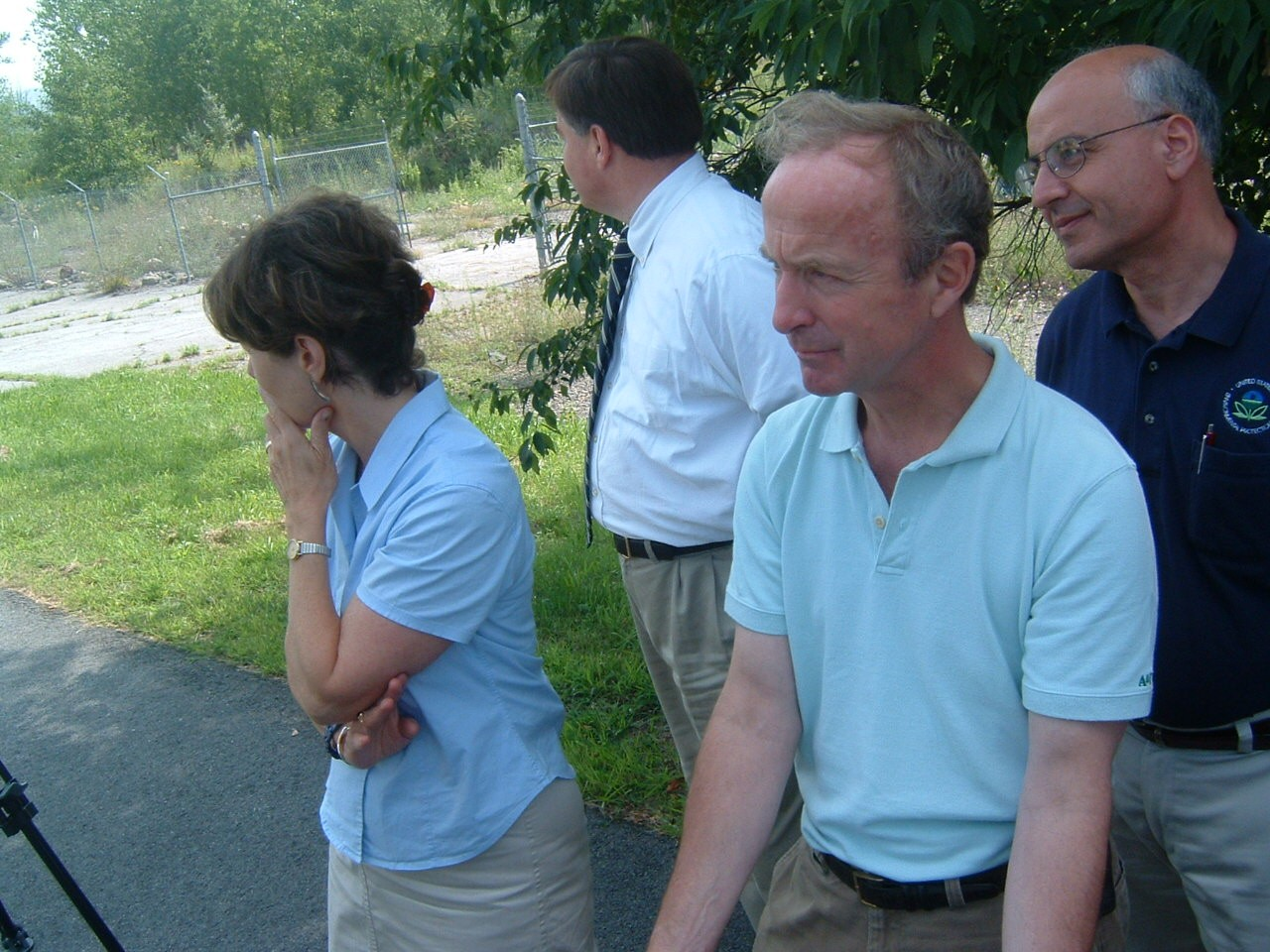
Frelinghuysen tours a Superfund site in his district

In May 2003, Frelinghuysen introduced H.R. 1964, the Highlands Conservation Act, a bill that recognized "the importance of the water, forest, agricultural, wildlife, recreational, and cultural resources of the Highlands region, and the national significance of the Highlands region to the United States", and authorized up to $10 million a year in federal matching funds for land preservation and protection in the Highlands states (Pennsylvania, New Jersey, New York, and Connecticut), as well as $1 million a year for United States Forest Service research and technical assistance programs. In November, 2004, George W. Bush signed the Highlands Conservation Act into law. In 2014, Congress failed to re-authorize the Act and the program expired.

As of May 2014 Frelinghuysen was one of eight Republican members of Congress who "accept the prevailing scientific conclusion that global warming is both real and man-made," according to PolitiFact. However, he opposes federal regulation of greenhouse gas emissions. The Sunlight Foundation pointed out that among the 435 members of the U.S. House of Representatives, Frelinghuysen has the third-highest amount of investment in oil stocks.

=== Health care ===
He favored repealing the Patient Protection and Affordable Care Act (Obamacare), and voted in support of the budget resolution to repeal Obamacare in January 2017. In March 2017, when the Republican leadership was seeking support for the "repeal-and-replace" bill, the American Health Care Act (AHCA), he announced that he would oppose it on the grounds that it "would place significant new costs and barriers to care on my constituents in New Jersey" and would result in a "loss of Medicaid coverage for so many people in my Medicaid-dependent state." On May 4, 2017, he voted for a revised version of the AHCA, although the provisions he had previously cited as objectionable were unchanged. He said that he "voted for an improved health care act".

Frelinghuysen stressed the need to "protect those with pre-existing conditions", but according to NJ.com, the bill "would allow for exemptions from rules preventing those with pre-existing conditions from being charged more for their insurance. It also would allow states to request waivers from federal requirements that all insurers cover specific benefits such as hospitalization, mental health treatment and maternity care." Asked why he voted for the bill without waiting for an estimate from the Congressional Budget Office on its impact, Frelinghuysen said, "I think there was a feeling that we needed to act and get the bill to the Senate so we can get them to act on it."

=== Immigration ===
Frelinghuysen had opposed sanctuary cities.

As Chairman of the House Appropriations Committee, he was part of the 29 representatives voting to send the 2018 Homeland Security appropriations bill to the full House. Among other funding, the bill includes $5 billion in funding for Trump's border wall. Referring to the bill, Frelinghuysen stated the bill "provides the necessary funding for critical technology and physical barriers to secure our borders".

=== Donald Trump ===
Frelinghuysen endorsed Donald Trump in the 2016 presidential election.

=== Other issues ===
Frelinghuysen had been in favor of auditing the Federal Reserve, and supported the Iraq War. He opposes same-sex marriage, and has voted against legislation which would establish net neutrality, which refers to the principle that Internet service providers cannot discriminate by user, content, website, or platform, and has voted in favor of legislation that would require photo IDs for voting in federal elections.

He had a "D" rating from NORML regarding his voting record on cannabis-related matters. He twice voted against providing veterans access to medical marijuana via their Veterans Health Administration doctor's recommendation. He blocked a vote on an amendment that would have given banks the ability to lend to legal, state-regulated marijuana businesses without having to worry about subsequent punishment by federal financial regulators.

He was one of the 24 Republicans (and 227 Democrats) to vote "yes" to refer the 2008 effort to impeach President George W. Bush to the judiciary committee, effectively killing it.

== Town halls and criticism of activist ==
In 2017, The New York Times noted that Frelinghuysen had not appeared at a public town hall since 2013, and that he stated he preferred small events at schools, community groups, and veteran organizations. In the aftermath of the 2016 election, a grassroots activist group called NJ 11th for Change organized demonstrations and town halls in an effort to get a face-to-face between Frelinghuysen and his constituents.

In 2017, Frelinghuysen wrote a campaign fundraising letter to a board member of a local bank. While Frelinghuysen did not name NJ 11th for Change, a progressive lobbying group, he included a handwritten postscript warning "One of the ringleaders works in your bank!", with an attached news article about one of NJ 11th for Change's members. The individual subsequently resigned from her position as assistant general counsel and senior vice president at that bank, citing pressure over her political involvement as one of the reasons.

According to a lawyer and former staffer for the Office of Congressional Ethics, to be unlawful such a letter would need to threaten action or be written on congressional stationery, not campaign letterhead, and/or the bank would have to have business pending before a Frelinghuysen committee. The progressive lobbying group Citizens for Responsibility and Ethics in Washington (CREW) opined that "whether or not [Frelinghuysen's letter] breaks a criminal statute is one issue, but the very clear issue is that it appears that a member of Congress might be using his power to threaten someone's employment because of their political activities." Richard W. Painter, a professor of law at the University of Minnesota and former chief White House ethics lawyer to President George W. Bush, described Frelinghuysen's actions as "not illegal but an awful thing to do."

Nonprofit ethics watchdog Campaign for Accountability filed a complaint with the Office of Congressional Ethics requesting an investigation into whether Frelinghuysen violated House ethics rules in his letter to the board member of the bank. Anyone can file a complaint with the Office of Congressional Ethics; the office reviews complaints from the public and can choose to refer those it considers valid to the House Ethics Committee. Frelinghuysen hired lawyers following the complaint.

== Lobbying career ==
In 2021, Frelinghuysen registered as a foreign agent on behalf of Tatiana Clouthier, the Secretary of the Economy of Mexico. As a member of lobbying firm and law firm Greenberg Traurig, he and the firm "technical advice, analysis and strategy on foreign trade that address and promote Mexico's interests".

== Awards and honors ==
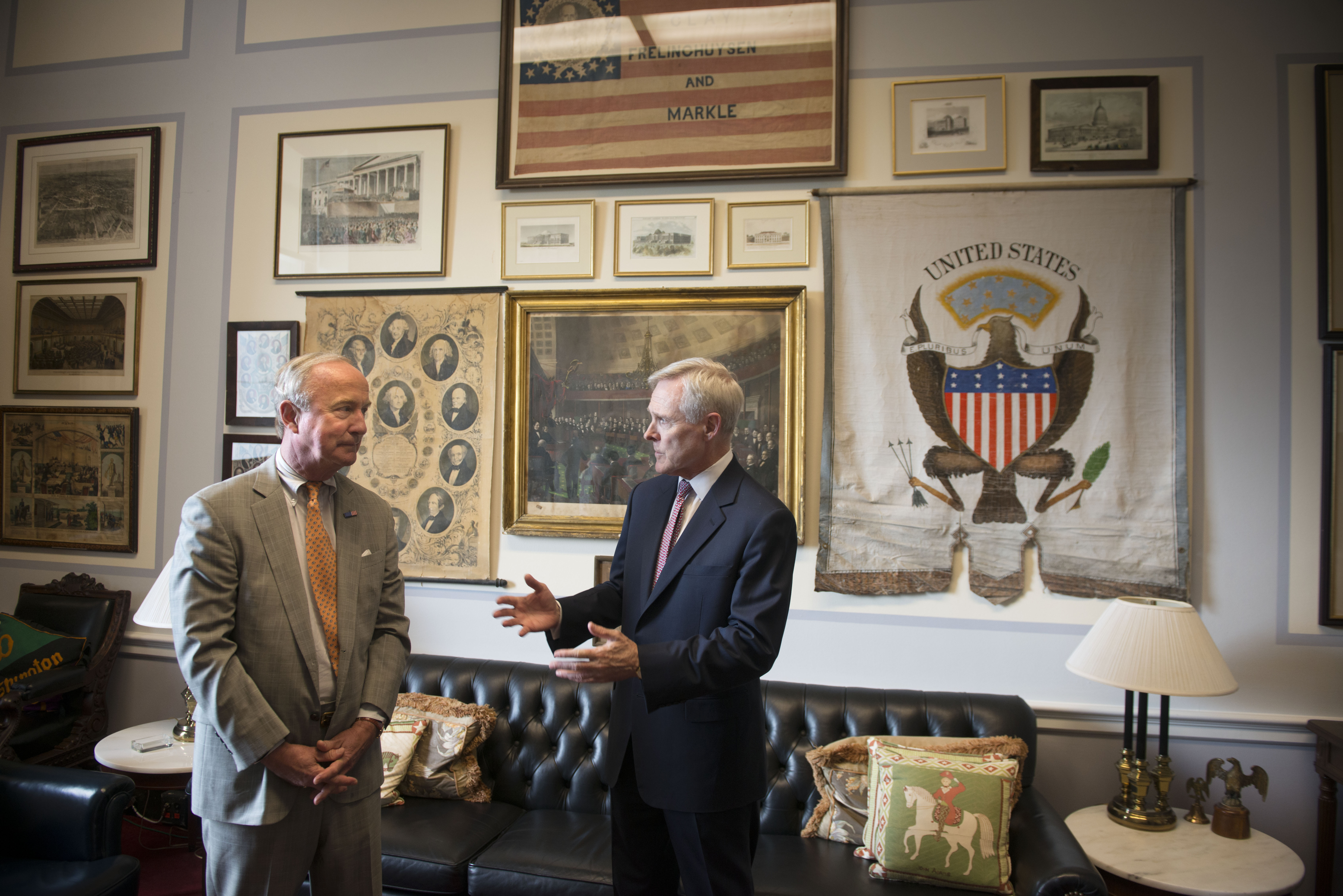
Secretary of the Navy Ray Mabus speaks with U.S. Rep. Rodney Frelinghuysen before presenting him with the Navy Distinguished Public Service Medal, at the U.S. Capitol in 2013.

In June 2013, Frelinghuysen was awarded the Navy Distinguished Public Service Award, the Navy's highest civilian honor, for the "long and selfless service" he had provided to the force, ensuring it had necessary resources and supporting its members' quality of life.

Frelinghuysen was awarded the Vietnam Service Medal for his service during the Vietnam War.

== Personal life ==
At the start of the 112th Congress, Frelinghuysen was ranked the ninth wealthiest member of congress, with an estimated personal wealth between $20 million and $65 million.

A Roll Call report on Frelinghuysen's wealth in 2010 indicated that about a third stemmed from personal and family trust investments in Procter & Gamble stock. He owns multiple properties, including nearly 18 acres of undeveloped land in Frelinghuysen Township, New Jersey.

On May 24, 2007, Frelinghuysen chased down a pickpocket who had stolen his wallet near his home in the Georgetown neighborhood of Washington, D.C. Two Washington police officers saw the chase and arrested the 18-year-old suspect who had been caught by the 61-year-old congressman.

He and his wife Virginia have two daughters, Louisine and Sarah.

Frelinghuysen is an Episcopalian.

== Electoral history ==
New Jersey's 11th congressional district: Results 1994–2016
Year	Democrat	Votes	Pct	Republican	Votes	Pct	3rd Party	Party	Votes	Pct	3rd Party	Party	Votes	Pct	
1994	Frank Herbert	50,211	28%	Rodney Frelinghuysen	127,868	71%	Mary Frueholz	LaRouche Was Right	1,065	1%					*
1996	Chris Evangel	78,742	31%	Rodney Frelinghuysen	169,091	66%	Ed DeMott	Independent	2,870	1%	Austin S. Lett	Independent	2,618	1%	*
1998	John P. Scollo	44,160	30%	Rodney Frelinghuysen	100,910	68%	Austin S. Lett	Independent	1,737	1%	Agnes James	Independent	1,409	1%	*
2000	John P. Scollo	80,958	30%	Rodney Frelinghuysen	186,140	68%	John Pickarski	Independent	5,199	2%	James Spinosa	Independent	1,541	1%	
2002	Vij Pawar	48,477	26%	Rodney Frelinghuysen	132,938	72%	Richard S. Roth	Libertarian	2,263	1%					
2004	James W. Buell	91,811	31%	Rodney Frelinghuysen	200,915	68%	John Mele	Immigration Moratorium Now	1,746	1%	Austin S. Lett	Libertarian	1,530	1%	
2006	Tom Wyka	74,414	37%	Rodney Frelinghuysen	126,085	62%	Richard S. Roth	Libertarian	1,730	1%	John Mele	Constitution	842	<1%	
2008	Tom Wyka	105,095	37%	Rodney Frelinghuysen	177,059	62%	Chandler Tedholm	For the People	3,526	1%					
2010	Douglas Herbert	55,472	31%	Rodney Frelinghuysen	122,149	67%	Jim Gawron	Libertarian	4,179	2%					
2012	John Arvanites	123,897	40.0%	Rodney Frelinghuysen	182,237	58.8%									
2014	Mark Dunec	65,477	37.4%	Rodney Frelinghuysen	104,455	62.6%									
2016	Joseph Wenzel	130,162	38.9%	Rodney Frelinghuysen	194,299	58%	Thomas DePasquale	Financial Independence Party	7,056	2.1%	Jeff Hetrick	Libertarian	3,475	1%	

*Write-in and minor candidate notes: In 1994, Stuart Bacha received 436 votes. In 1996, Victoria S. Spruiell received 1,837 votes. In 1998, Stephen A. Bauer received 755 votes. In 2000, Ficus received between 68 and 150 votes.

U.S. House of Representatives
Preceded by Dean Gallo	Member of the U.S. House of Representatives from New Jersey's 11th congressional district 1995–2019	Succeeded by Mikie Sherrill
Preceded by Hal Rogers	Chair of the House Appropriations Committee; 2017–2019	Succeeded by Nita Lowey
U.S. order of precedence (ceremonial)
Preceded by Rob Andrews as Former U.S. Representative	Order of precedence of the United States as Former U.S. Representative	Succeeded by Frank LoBiondo as Former U.S. Representative
