= New Jersey's 25th legislative district =

American legislative district

- Senator: Anthony M. Bucco (R)
- Assembly members: Aura K. Dunn (R); Marisa Sweeney (D)
- Registration: 33.73% Republican; 31.86% Democratic; 33.41% unaffiliated
- Demographics: 68.5% White; 3.7% Black/African American; 0.5% Native American; 6.5% Asian; 0.0% Hawaiian/Pacific Islander; 9.7% Other race; 11.1% Two or more races; 21.4% Hispanic
- Population: 221,043
- Voting-age population: 174,207
- Registered voters: 174,014

New Jersey's 25th legislative district is one of 40 in the New Jersey Legislature. The district includes the Morris County municipalities of Boonton Township, Butler, Dover Town, Harding, Jefferson, Kinnelon, Madison, Mendham Borough, Mendham Township, Mine Hill Township, Morris Township, Morristown, Mount Arlington, Randolph Township, Rockaway Borough, Rockaway Township, Victory Gardens, and Wharton; and the Passaic County municipality of West Milford.

== Demographic characteristics ==
As of the 2020 United States census, the district had a population of 221,043, of whom 174,207 (78.8%) were of voting age. The racial makeup of the district was 151,305 (68.5%) White, 8,170 (3.7%) African American, 1,187 (0.5%) Native American, 14,367 (6.5%) Asian, 50 (0.0%) Pacific Islander, 21,482 (9.7%) from some other race, and 24,482 (11.1%) from two or more races. Hispanic or Latino of any race were 47,305 (21.4%) of the population.

The district had high levels of income on average, but the communities of Dover, Mine Hill, Victory Gardens are well below the state average. The district had a high percentage of Hispanic residents, with Dover having some 60% of its residents as being of Hispanic origin.

Although traditionally thought of as a Republican stronghold, the demographics of the district have trended more Democratic in recent years. At the time of the 2011 legislative apportionment, Republicans held a 16,737 vote (12.0%) registration advantage. By 2019, that advantage was down to 7,801 votes (4.9%). The 25th district had 188,046 registered voters as of February 1, 2025, of whom 65,183 (34.7%) were registered as unaffiliated, 62,624 (33.3%) were registered as Republicans, 58,332 (31.0%) were registered as Democrats, and 1,907 (1.0%) were registered to other parties.

== Political representation ==
For the 2026–2027 session, the 25th legislative district of the New Jersey Legislature is represented in the State Senate by Anthony M. Bucco (R, Boonton Township) and in the General Assembly by Aura K. Dunn (R, Mendham Borough) and Marisa Sweeney (D, Morristown).

The district is split between New Jersey's 5th, New Jersey's 7th, and New Jersey's 11th congressional districts.

== Apportionment history ==
The first iteration of the 25th district came in 1973 upon the creation of the statewide 40-district legislative map. The 25th at that time traveled from Maplewood along the western border of Essex County to Fairfield Township (also including North Caldwell, Passaic County's Wayne Township, and Lincoln Park and Pequannock Township in Morris County. In the next redistricting in 1981, the district became based through the center of Morris County running from Harding Township through Morristown, Dover, Boonton, and Jefferson Township. The shape of the district remained mostly the same in the 1991 redistricting picking up Mendham Township, Mount Arlington, and Roxbury Township, but losing Madison and Mountain Lakes.

Changes to the district made as part of the New Jersey Legislative apportionment in 2001, based on the results of the 2000 United States census added Mountain Lakes Borough (from the 26th legislative district) and removed Hanover Township (to the 26th legislative district) and Harding Township (to the 21st legislative district). As a consequence of the New Jersey Legislative apportionment in 2011, Jefferson Township and Rockaway Township were moved to the 26th district. The 25th district was shifted south and west, adding Morris County GOP strongholds Mendham Borough (from the 16th district), Chester Borough, Chester Township and Washington Township (from the 24th district); and Bernardsville in Somerset County (from the 16th district).

William E. Bishop was elected in a special election held on April 20, 1982, to fill the vacancy left by James J. Barry Jr., who had been named as Director of the New Jersey Division of Consumer Affairs by Governor of New Jersey Thomas Kean. Bishop was defeated by Morris County Freeholder Rodney Frelinghuysen and incumbent Arthur R. Albohn in the 1983 Republican primary for the full term.

In the 1993 general election, former Assemblymember Gordon MacInnes defeated Republican incumbent John H. Dorsey by nearly 300 votes, making him the first Democrat in 18 years to win a legislative seat in Morris County.

After Frelinghuysen took office in the United States House of Representatives in January 1995, Anthony R. Bucco was chosen by Morris County Republican county committee members to fill Frelinghuysen's vacant seat in the Assembly. Bucco and Michael Patrick Carroll won the six-way June 1995 Republican primary to fill the district's two Assembly ballot spots, which became open when Albohn decided against running for re-election for a ninth term of office. In this primary, the two winners defeated then Morris County Freeholder Chris Christie and future Assemblyman Rick Merkt. In 1997, Anthony R. Bucco left the Assembly to successfully contest the Democratic-held Senate seat, with Merkt taking the Assembly seat vacated by Bucco.

With Merkt running for the Republican nomination for governor in 2009, the 25th district saw a contested Republican primary with incumbent Michael Patrick Carroll facing Anthony M. Bucco and the younger Bucco's brother-in-law Douglas Cabana, a member of the Morris County Board of Chosen Freeholders. Bucco and Carroll won the two ballot spots and were elected in the general election.

In 2011, Michael Patrick Carroll and Tony Bucco retained their seats in the Assembly, defeating Democratic challengers Gale Heiss-Colucci and George Stafford, while Anthony R. Bucco retained his Senate seat over challenger Rick Thoeni. In 2013, with no Democratic challengers and only token opposition, all three incumbents sailed to victory, earning over 80% of the vote.

In 2017, in the closest race since the district was created in 1973, Anthony Bucco narrowly defeated Democratic challenger Lisa Bhimani by just over 2500 votes to retain his Senate seat. In the Assembly race, Carroll and the younger Bucco defeated Democratic challengers Thomas Moran and Richard Corcoran by a similar margin. In 2018, Carroll announced he would not seek re-election in 2019, choosing instead to run for Morris County surrogate. On June 4, 2019, in the first contested Assembly primary in the district since 2009, Tony Bucco and Brian Bergen defeated Aura K. Dunn and John Barbarula to win the Republican nomination for General Assembly.

Senator Anthony R. Bucco died in September 2019. A special convention of the Republican County Committee members from the district met on October 15, 2019, and unanimously selected his son, Assemblyman Anthony M. "Tony" Bucco to fill his father's seat until a 2020 special election. Assemblyman Bucco resigned from the Assembly the day he was sworn into the Senate. Another special convention was then held made up of the Republican County Committee members, in order to fill the vacant Assembly seat. At a November 21 convention, Aura K. Dunn was chosen to serve until the end of the current legislative session, January 14, 2020. Upon the start of the new session, Tony Bucco declined to be seated to the Assembly seat to which he was elected in November 2019 and a third convention was held on February 1, 2020, which unanimously selected Dunn to serve until a special election in November 2020.

== Election history ==
Session	Senate	General Assembly	
1974–1975	James Wallwork (R)	Jane Burgio (R)	Thomas Kean (R)
1976–1977	James Wallwork (R)	Jane Burgio (R)	Thomas Kean (R)
1978–1979	James Wallwork (R)	Jane Burgio (R)	Frederic Remington (R)
1980–1981	James Wallwork (R)	Jane Burgio (R)	Frederic Remington (R)
1982–1983	John H. Dorsey (R)	Arthur R. Albohn (R)	James J. Barry Jr. (R) (Note: Resigned February 22, 1982)
1982–1983	John H. Dorsey (R)	Arthur R. Albohn (R)	William E. Bishop (R) (Note: Elected to the Assembly in April 1982 special election, sworn in on May 3, 1982)
1984–1985	John H. Dorsey (R)	Arthur R. Albohn (R)	Rodney Frelinghuysen (R)
1986–1987	John H. Dorsey (R)	Arthur R. Albohn (R)	Rodney Frelinghuysen (R)
1988–1989	John H. Dorsey (R)	Arthur R. Albohn (R)	Rodney Frelinghuysen (R)
1990–1991	John H. Dorsey (R)	Arthur R. Albohn (R)	Rodney Frelinghuysen (R)
1992–1993	John H. Dorsey (R)	Arthur R. Albohn (R)	Rodney Frelinghuysen (R)
1994–1995	Gordon MacInnes (D)	Arthur R. Albohn (R)	Rodney Frelinghuysen (R) (Note: Resigned January 3, 1995 upon his election to Congress)
1994–1995	Gordon MacInnes (D)	Arthur R. Albohn (R)	Anthony R. Bucco (R) (Note: Appointed to the Assembly on January 23, 1995)
1996–1997	Gordon MacInnes (D)	Michael Patrick Carroll (R)	Anthony R. Bucco (R)
1998–1999	Anthony R. Bucco (R)	Michael Patrick Carroll (R)	Rick Merkt (R)
2000–2001	Anthony R. Bucco (R)	Michael Patrick Carroll (R)	Rick Merkt (R)
2002–2003	Anthony R. Bucco (R)	Michael Patrick Carroll (R)	Rick Merkt (R)
2004–2005	Anthony R. Bucco (R)	Michael Patrick Carroll (R)	Rick Merkt (R)
2006–2007	Anthony R. Bucco (R)	Michael Patrick Carroll (R)	Rick Merkt (R)
2008–2009	Anthony R. Bucco (R)	Michael Patrick Carroll (R)	Rick Merkt (R)
2010–2011	Anthony R. Bucco (R)	Michael Patrick Carroll (R)	Anthony M. Bucco (R)
2012–2013	Anthony R. Bucco (R)	Michael Patrick Carroll (R)	Anthony M. Bucco (R)
2014–2015	Anthony R. Bucco (R)	Michael Patrick Carroll (R)	Anthony M. Bucco (R)
2016–2017	Anthony R. Bucco (R)	Michael Patrick Carroll (R)	Anthony M. Bucco (R)
2018–2019	Anthony R. Bucco (R) (Note: Died September 16, 2019)	Michael Patrick Carroll (R)	Anthony M. Bucco (R) (Note: Appointed to the Senate on October 24, 2019, won November 3, 2020 special election to complete the term)
2018–2019	Anthony M. Bucco (R)	Michael Patrick Carroll (R)	Aura K. Dunn (R) (Note: Appointed to the Assembly on November 25, 2019)
2020–2021	Anthony M. Bucco (R)	Brian Bergen (R)	Seat vacant (Note: Anthony M. Bucco was elected to the Assembly in 2019, but declined to take his seat in order to stay in the Senate)
2020–2021	Anthony M. Bucco (R)	Brian Bergen (R)	Aura K. Dunn (R) (Note: Appointed to the Assembly on February 3, 2020, won November 3, 2020 special election to complete the term)
2022–2023	Anthony M. Bucco (R)	Brian Bergen (R)	Aura K. Dunn (R)
2024–2025	Anthony M. Bucco (R)	Christian Barranco (R)	Aura K. Dunn (R)
2026–2027	Anthony M. Bucco (R)	Marisa Sweeney (D)	Aura K. Dunn (R)

== Election results ==
=== Senate ===
2023 New Jersey general election
Party	Candidate	Votes	%	±%
Republican	Anthony M. Bucco	27,250	52.7	▼4.8
Democratic	Christine Clarke	24,491	47.2	▲4.7
Total votes		51,741	100.0	

2021 New Jersey general election
Party	Candidate	Votes	%	±%
Republican	Anthony M. Bucco	43,758	57.5	▲3.5
Democratic	Jeffrey Grayzel	32,381	42.5	▼3.5
Total votes		76,139	100.0	

Special election, November 3, 2020
Party	Candidate	Votes	%	±%
Republican	Anthony M. Bucco	67,142	54.0	▲1.8
Democratic	Rupande Mehta	57,192	46.0	▼1.8
Total votes		124,334	100.0	

New Jersey general election, 2017
Party	Candidate	Votes	%	±%
Republican	Anthony R. Bucco	30,659	52.2	▼34.6
Democratic	Lisa Bhimani	28,131	47.8	N/A
Total votes		58,790	100.0	

New Jersey general election, 2013
Party	Candidate	Votes	%	±%
Republican	Anthony "Tony" Bucco	36,517	86.8	▲25.8
Buck the Parties	Maureen Castriotta	5,577	13.2	N/A
Total votes		42,094	100.0	

2011 New Jersey general election
Party	Candidate	Votes	%
Republican	Anthony "Tony" Bucco	19,228	61.0
Democratic	Rick Thoeni	12,298	39.0
Total votes		31,526	100.0

2007 New Jersey general election
Party	Candidate	Votes	%	±%
Republican	Anthony Bucco	23,754	61.5	▲6.4
Democratic	Frank Herbert	14,881	38.5	▼6.4
Total votes		38,635	100.0	

2003 New Jersey general election
Party	Candidate	Votes	%	±%
Republican	Anthony R. Bucco	22,163	55.1	▼10.4
Democratic	Blair B. Mac Innes	18,060	44.9	▲10.4
Total votes		40,223	100.0	

2001 New Jersey general election
Party	Candidate	Votes	%
Republican	Anthony R. Bucco	38,020	65.5
Democratic	Horace Chamberlain	20,017	34.5
Total votes		58,037	100.0

1997 New Jersey general election
Party	Candidate	Votes	%	±%
Republican	Anthony R. Bucco	37,048	54.8	▲5.1
Democratic	Gordon MacInnes	29,515	43.7	▼6.6
Conservative	Joseph Long	1,033	1.5	N/A
Total votes		67,596	100.0	

1993 New Jersey general election
Party	Candidate	Votes	%	±%
Democratic	Gordon A. MacInnes	34,646	50.3	▲22.0
Republican	John H. Dorsey	34,291	49.7	▼22.0
Total votes		68,937	100.0	

1991 New Jersey general election
Party	Candidate	Votes	%
Republican	John H. Dorsey	31,268	71.7
Democratic	Adele Montgomery	12,363	28.3
Total votes		43,631	100.0

1987 New Jersey general election
Party	Candidate	Votes	%	±%
Republican	John H. Dorsey	20,463	52.7	▼12.7
Democratic	Gordon A. MacInnes	18,381	47.3	▲12.7
Total votes		38,844	100.0	

1983 New Jersey general election
Party	Candidate	Votes	%	±%
Republican	John H. Dorsey	25,529	65.4	▼2.6
Democratic	Allen Hantman	13,524	34.6	▲2.6
Total votes		39,053	100.0	

1981 New Jersey general election
Party	Candidate	Votes	%
Republican	John H. Dorsey	36,433	68.0
Democratic	Horace Chamberlain	17,137	32.0
Total votes		53,570	100.0

1977 New Jersey general election
Party	Candidate	Votes	%	±%
Republican	James H. Wallwork	35,517	60.6	▲6.4
Democratic	Lewis J. Paper	23,096	39.4	▼6.4
Total votes		58,613	100.0	

1973 New Jersey general election
Party	Candidate	Votes	%
Republican	James H. Wallwork	30,552	54.2
Democratic	Joel Wasserman	25,778	45.8
Total votes		56,330	100.0

=== General Assembly ===
2025 New Jersey general election
Party	Candidate	Votes	%	±%
Democratic	Marisa Sweeney	49,918	25.6	▲1.5
Republican	Aura K. Dunn	49,088	25.2	▼1.1
Republican	Christian Barranco	48,125	24.7	▼1.0
Democratic	Steven Pylpychuk	47,723	24.5	▲0.7
Total votes		194,854	100.0	

2023 New Jersey general election
Party	Candidate	Votes	%	±%
Republican	Aura K. Dunn	26,717	26.4	▼1.8
Republican	Christian Barranco	25,988	25.7	▼2.1
Democratic	Diane Salvatore	24,420	24.1	▲1.8
Democratic	Jonathan Torres	24,055	23.8	▲2.2
Total votes		101,180	100.0	

2021 New Jersey general election
Party	Candidate	Votes	%	±%
Republican	Aura K. Dunn	42,183	28.2	▲1.2
Republican	Brian Bergen	41,584	27.8	▲2.1
Democratic	Lauren Barnett	33,322	22.3	▼1.7
Democratic	Patricia L. Veres	32,243	21.6	▼1.7
Total votes		149,332	100.0	

Special election, November 3, 2020
Party	Candidate	Votes	%
Republican	Aura K. Dunn	64,469	52.5
Democratic	Darcy Draeger	58,446	47.5
Total votes		122,915	100.0

2019 New Jersey general election
Party	Candidate	Votes	%	±%
Republican	Anthony M. Bucco	27,438	27.0	▲0.9
Republican	Brian Bergen	26,134	25.7	▼0.5
Democratic	Lisa Bhimani	24,381	24.0	0.0
Democratic	Darcy Draeger	23,702	23.3	▼0.3
Total votes		101,655	100.0	

New Jersey general election, 2017
Party	Candidate	Votes	%	±%
Republican	Michael Patrick Carroll	30,323	26.2	▼2.0
Republican	Anthony M. Bucco	30,278	26.1	▼3.4
Democratic	Thomas Moran	27,848	24.0	▲3.2
Democratic	Richard Corcoran	27,386	23.6	▲2.0
Total votes		115,835	100.0	

New Jersey general election, 2015
Party	Candidate	Votes	%	±%
Republican	Anthony M. Bucco	13,974	29.5	▼13.5
Republican	Michael Patrick Carroll	13,372	28.2	▼12.2
Democratic	Richard J. Corcoran III	10,230	21.6	N/A
Democratic	Thomas Moran	9,849	20.8	N/A
Total votes		47,425	100.0	

New Jersey general election, 2013
Party	Candidate	Votes	%	±%
Republican	Anthony M. Bucco	35,536	43.0	▲13.5
Republican	Michael Patrick Carroll	33,393	40.4	▲10.4
Listen, Lead, Succeed	Rebecca Feldman	9,209	11.2	N/A
Principle Before Politics	Jack Curtis	4,426	5.4	N/A
Total votes		82,564	100.0	

New Jersey general election, 2011
Party	Candidate	Votes	%
Republican	Michael Patrick Carroll	18,481	30.0
Republican	Anthony M. Bucco	18,218	29.5
Democratic	Gale Heiss Colucci	12,564	20.4
Democratic	George Stafford	12,432	20.2
Total votes		61,695	100.0

New Jersey general election, 2009
Party	Candidate	Votes	%	±%
Republican	Anthony Bucco	39,150	33.0	▲3.3
Republican	Michael Patrick Carroll	38,188	32.2	▲3.3
Democratic	Wendy Wright	21,431	18.0	▼3.5
Democratic	Rebekah Conroy	20,010	16.8	▼3.1
Total votes		118,779	100.0	

New Jersey general election, 2007
Party	Candidate	Votes	%	±%
Republican	Rick Merkt	22,102	29.7	▲1.6
Republican	Michael Patrick Carroll	21,468	28.9	▲2.1
Democratic	Dana Wefer	16,001	21.5	▼1.1
Democratic	Marshall L. Gates	14,780	19.9	▼2.6
Total votes		74,351	100.0	

New Jersey general election, 2005
Party	Candidate	Votes	%	±%
Republican	Richard A. Merkt	32,089	28.1	▼9.0
Republican	Michael P. Carroll	30,636	26.8	▼10.8
Democratic	Thomas Jackson	25,751	22.6	▼2.8
Democratic	Janice Schindler	25,709	22.5	N/A
Total votes		114,185	100.0	

New Jersey general election, 2003
Party	Candidate	Votes	%	±%
Republican	Michael P. Carroll	23,841	37.6	▲7.6
Republican	Rick Merkt	23,525	37.1	▲7.1
Democratic	Thomas A. Zelante	16,094	25.4	▲4.6
Total votes		63,460	100.0	

New Jersey general election, 2001
Party	Candidate	Votes	%
Republican	Michael Patrick Carroll	33,426	30.0
Republican	Rick Merkt	33,414	30.0
Democratic	Ann Huber	23,110	20.8
Democratic	Dick Tighe	21,408	19.2
Total votes		111,358	100.0

New Jersey general election, 1999
Party	Candidate	Votes	%	±%
Republican	Rick Merkt	17,259	30.5	▼0.2
Republican	Michael Patrick Carroll	17,204	30.4	▼1.4
Democratic	Ronald J. Pellegrino	10,607	18.7	▲1.1
Democratic	Gerald A. Nunan	10,018	17.7	▲0.1
Conservative	James Spinosa	772	1.4	0.0
Conservative	Stephen Spinosa	750	1.3	▲0.2
Total votes		56,610	100.0	

New Jersey general election, 1997
Party	Candidate	Votes	%	±%
Republican	Michael Patrick Carroll	37,935	31.8	▲3.2
Republican	Rick Merkt	36,649	30.7	▼0.1
Democratic	Chris Evangel	20,968	17.6	▼0.7
Democratic	Harriet Lerner	20,967	17.6	▼0.5
Conservative	James Spinosa	1,630	1.4	▼0.7
Conservative	Stephen Spinosa	1,296	1.1	▼1.0
Total votes		119,445	100.0	

New Jersey general election, 1995
Party	Candidate	Votes	%	±%
Republican	Anthony R. Bucco	21,787	30.8	▼6.1
Republican	Michael P. Carroll	20,215	28.6	▼2.6
Democratic	Stephen D. Landfield	12,943	18.3	▲2.0
Democratic	Stanley B. Yablonsky	12,795	18.1	▲3.1
Conservative	Joseph Long	1,495	2.1	N/A
Conservative	Jim Spinosa	1,478	2.1	N/A
Total votes		70,713	100.0	

New Jersey general election, 1993
Party	Candidate	Votes	%	±%
Republican	Rodney P. Frelinghuysen	48,596	36.9	▼0.3
Republican	Arthur R. Albohn	41,015	31.2	▼3.3
Democratic	Michael J. Andrisano	21,405	16.3	▲1.3
Democratic	Randy Davis	19,731	15.0	▲1.7
Constitutionalize the Fed	Mary Frueholz	801	0.6	N/A
Total votes		131,548	100.0	

1991 New Jersey general election
Party	Candidate	Votes	%
Republican	Rodney P. Frelinghuysen	31,792	37.2
Republican	Arthur R. Albohn	29,461	34.5
Democratic	Ann Avram Huber	12,822	15.0
Democratic	Marc N. Pindus	11,405	13.3
Total votes		85,480	100.0

1989 New Jersey general election
Party	Candidate	Votes	%	±%
Republican	Rodney P. Frelinghuysen	33,658	32.8	▼10.3
Republican	Arthur R. Albohn	29,645	28.9	▼7.5
Democratic	Kathleen Daley	21,029	20.5	N/A
Democratic	George Stafford	18,290	17.8	▼2.7
Total votes		102,622	100.0	

1987 New Jersey general election
Party	Candidate	Votes	%	±%
Republican	Rodney P. Frelinghuysen	27,896	43.1	▲6.0
Republican	Arthur R. Albohn	23,537	36.4	▲2.4
Democratic	George J. Stafford	13,233	20.5	▲5.7
Total votes		64,666	100.0	

1985 New Jersey general election
Party	Candidate	Votes	%	±%
Republican	Rodney P. Frelinghuysen	31,695	37.1	▲5.4
Republican	Arthur R. Albohn	29,043	34.0	▲4.6
Democratic	Donald Cresitello	12,652	14.8	▼4.9
Democratic	Carl A. Mottey	11,955	14.0	▼5.2
Total votes		85,345	100.0	

New Jersey general election, 1983
Party	Candidate	Votes	%	±%
Republican	Rodney P. Frelinghuysen	24,221	31.7	▼0.7
Republican	Arthur R. Albohn	22,469	29.4	▼1.0
Democratic	Jon Huston	15,025	19.7	▲0.6
Democratic	Mark J. Malone	14,621	19.2	▲1.1
Total votes		76,336	100.0	

Special election, April 20, 1982
Party	Candidate	Votes	%
Republican	William E. Bishop	7,132	42.9
Democratic	Robert Johnson	6,330	38.1
A Clear Voice	Rosemarie Totaro	3,161	19.0
Total votes		16,623	100.0

New Jersey general election, 1981
Party	Candidate	Votes	%
Republican	James J. Barry, Jr.	34,366	32.4
Republican	Arthur R. Albohn	32,226	30.4
Democratic	Stephen Young	20,270	19.1
Democratic	Ed Baker	19,147	18.1
Total votes		106,009	100.0

New Jersey general election, 1979
Party	Candidate	Votes	%	±%
Republican	Jane Burgio	25,025	32.2	▲0.7
Republican	Frederic Remington	20,258	26.1	▼1.7
Democratic	Jim Bildner	18,294	23.5	▲2.3
Democratic	Alexander A. Trento	14,120	18.2	▼1.3
Total votes		77,697	100.0	

New Jersey general election, 1977
Party	Candidate	Votes	%	±%
Republican	Jane Burgio	34,859	31.5	▲0.8
Republican	Frederic Remington	30,754	27.8	▼4.9
Democratic	Donald S. Coburn	23,424	21.2	▲3.4
Democratic	Bernard Reiner	21,553	19.5	▲2.4
Total votes		110,590	100.0	

New Jersey general election, 1975
Party	Candidate	Votes	%	±%
Republican	Thomas H. Kean	34,111	32.7	▲3.5
Republican	Jane Burgio	32,077	30.7	▲5.8
Democratic	Charles P. Cohen	18,528	17.8	▼6.1
Democratic	Joseph C. Tucci	17,822	17.1	▼4.9
Tax Revolt	Robert F. Herrmann	1,811	1.7	N/A
Total votes		104,349	100.0	

New Jersey general election, 1973
Party	Candidate	Votes	%
Republican	Thomas H. Kean	32,708	29.2
Republican	Jane Burgio	27,869	24.9
Democratic	Thomas P. Giblin	26,790	23.9
Democratic	Nicholas Saleeby	24,689	22.0
Total votes		112,056	100.0
