= Stephen B. Wiley =

American politician

Member of the New Jersey Senate
- In office November 12, 1973 – January 10, 1978
- Preceded by: Joseph J. Maraziti
- Succeeded by: John H. Dorsey
- Constituency: 10th at-large (1973–74); 23rd district (1974–78)

Personal details
- Born: Stephen Bradford Wiley; June 21, 1929 Morristown, New Jersey, U.S.
- Died: October 8, 2015 (aged 86) Shelburne, Vermont, U.S.
- Party: Democratic
- Spouse: Judith Alexander Wiley
- Children: Three
- Education: Princeton University; Columbia Law School

Stephen Bradford Wiley (June 21, 1929 – October 8, 2015) was an American politician, attorney, civic leader, businessman, and poet from the state of New Jersey.

After graduating from Princeton University and Columbia Law School and serving in the United States Army, Wiley worked as legal counsel to New Jersey Governor Robert B. Meyner. He was a partner in the law firm of Meyner and Wiley and, later, in the law firm of Wiley, Malehorn and Sirota. Wiley also founded Morris Cablevision, First Morris Bank and Trust, and the Morris County United Way. During the 1970s, Wiley spearheaded a legal battle against de facto segregation that resulted in the formation of a regional school district serving Morristown, Morris Township and (for high school) Morris Plains.

A Democrat, Wiley represented Morris County in the New Jersey State Senate from 1973 to 1978. He drafted the legislation that established New Jersey's state income tax. Governor Brendan Byrne nominated Wiley to the New Jersey Supreme Court in 1975, but the Supreme Court rejected his nomination because the State Legislature had voted to raise the salary of Supreme Court justices during his Senate tenure. Wiley was an unsuccessful candidate for Governor of New Jersey in the 1985 Democratic primary election.

Wiley published three books of poetry during his later life.

== Early life, education, and military service ==
Wiley was born on June 21, 1929 in Morristown, New Jersey to Katharine (née Pellett) and J. Burton Wiley. He attended Morristown High School, graduating in 1947. His father had been the district's superintendent of schools. Wiley earned his undergraduate degree from Princeton University in 1951, graduating cum laude with a major in Politics. Wiley was awarded a law degree from Columbia Law School in 1954. He served in the United States Army from 1954 to 1956.

== Legal career, business career, and civic involvement ==
Wiley was an assistant prosecutor in Morris County. He also worked as legal counsel to New Jersey Governor Robert B. Meyner. In 1962, when Meyner left office, he and Wiley formed the law firm of Meyner and Wiley.

In the early 1970s, Wiley led a legal battle to stop Morris Township from building its own high school. Wiley was concerned that separate high schools in Morris Township and Morristown would create a system of de facto segregation, "[hastening] white flight from Morristown [and] dooming it to the same turmoil afflicting New Jersey’s urban centers." Wiley believed that "having 'a minority center and a white ring around it is nothing but a guarantee of an explosion...'" The court battle went all the way to the New Jersey Supreme Court, and resulted in the formation of a regional school district serving Morristown, Morris Township and (for high school) Morris Plains.

In 1973, Wiley founded the law firm of Wiley, Malehorn and Sirota (later renamed Wiley, Malehorn, Sirota, and Raynes) in Morris Township. Wiley also founded Morris Cablevision, the county's first cable television company; the First Morris Bank and Trust; and the Morris County United Way. "Wiley spearheaded multi-million-dollar fund drives to secure and enhance public institutions that are bedrocks of the [greater Morristown, New Jersey] community: The Community Theatre (now the Mayo Performing Arts Center), the Morristown & Township Library and the historic Morristown Green."

== Political career ==
In the aftermath of the Watergate scandal in 1973, Wiley ran for the New Jersey State Senate in two separate but concurrent elections. One election was a special election in the 10th Legislative District (consisting of the entirety of Morris County) to fill the remaining term of Joseph J. Maraziti, who had been elected to the United States House of Representatives in the previous year. The other election was for a four-year term in the newly formed 23rd Legislative District (consisting of central Morris County municipalities). In both elections, he faced Republican Assemblywoman Josephine Margetts. Wiley defeated Margetts in both elections (by two points in the special election and by six in the regular election), becoming the first Democrat to win a State Senate seat from Morris County in sixty years.

Wiley was sworn into the Senate on November 12, 1973, serving two months of Maraziti's unexpired term from the at-large Morris County district. He served as Chair of the Senate Education Committee, the Joint Committee on the Public Schools and the Senate Rules Committee. Wiley was responsible for drafting legislation which became the Public School Education Act of 1975; this law established a state income tax in New Jersey that was specified as a source for school funding in addition to locally assessed property taxes. He was named a top legislator by New Jersey Monthly magazine.

Wiley was defeated by Assemblyman John H. Dorsey, 54%-46%, in his 1977 re-election bid.

Wiley ran for the Democratic gubernatorial nomination in 1985, focusing on the state's toxic waste problem as a campaign issue as he targeted incumbent Republican Governor Tom Kean. Wiley also focused on the Kean administration's failure to provide state aid to public schools under the formula dictated by the Public Education Act of 1975 that Wiley had sponsored. Wiley came in a distant fourth place with 8.6 percent of the vote in the Democratic primary; winner Peter Shapiro received 31.0%, State Senator John F. Russo received 26.6%, and Newark mayor Kenneth A. Gibson received 26.1%.

== New Jersey Supreme Court nomination ==
Governor Brendan Byrne nominated Wiley to the New Jersey Supreme Court in 1975 following the retirement of Justice Frederick W. Hall. His nomination was approved by the Senate, but was challenged by former Assemblyman David Friedland on the grounds that the State Legislature had voted to raise the salary of justices of the Supreme Court during Wiley's Senate tenure. On February 11, 1977, after two years of appeals, the New Jersey Supreme Court rejected Wiley's nomination because of the pay raise, ruling that Wiley could not be appointed to serve on the Court until after his term of office expired. According to The New York Times, the Constitution of the State of New Jersey provided that "no legislator may be appointed to a state job until after his term expires if the salary for the job was raised during the term." Alan B. Handler was later appointed and confirmed to fill the vacancy on the Court.

== Poetry ==
At the age of 70, Wiley began writing poetry. He published three books of poetry: Hero Island (published in 2005), Mockingbird Come Home (published in 2007), and Latitudes (published in 2009).

== Personal life and death ==
In 1953, Wiley married Judith Alexander. The Wileys had two sons, Jonathan and Benjamin; a daughter named Katharine; and several grandchildren. In 2012, the Wileys sold their Morris County home and moved full-time to South Hero, Vermont, on Lake Champlain; they later moved to nearby Shelburne, Vermont.

Wiley died on October 8, 2015 in Shelburne at the age of 86.

New Jersey Senate
Preceded by District created	Member of the New Jersey Senate for the 23rd District; January 8, 1974 – January 10, 1978	Succeeded by John H. Dorsey
Preceded by Joseph J. Maraziti	Member of the New Jersey Senate for the 10th District; November 12, 1973 – January 8, 1974; Served alongside: Peter W. Thomas	Succeeded by District eliminated
