= John H. Dorsey =

American attorney and politician (1937–2018)

Member of the New Jersey Senate
- In office January 10, 1978 – January 11, 1994
- Preceded by: Stephen B. Wiley
- Succeeded by: Gordon MacInnes
- Constituency: 23rd district (1978–1982); 25th district (1982–1994)

Member of the New Jersey General Assembly from the 23rd Legislative District
- In office January 13, 1976 – January 10, 1978
- Preceded by: Gordon MacInnes; Rosemarie Totaro
- Succeeded by: Rosemarie Totaro

Personal details
- Born: December 26, 1937 Newark, New Jersey, U.S.
- Died: December 16, 2018 (aged 80) Pequannock Township, New Jersey, U.S.
- Party: Republican

John H. Dorsey (December 26, 1937 — December 16, 2018) was an American attorney and Republican Party politician who served in both houses of the New Jersey Legislature from 1976 to 1994, serving in the New Jersey General Assembly from 1976 to 1978 and in the New Jersey Senate from 1978 to 1994. Dorsey represented the 23rd Legislative District until 1982 and the 25th Legislative District starting that year in redistricting following the 1980 United States census.

Dorsey was born on December 26, 1937, in Newark and resided in Boonton Township. He served in the General Assembly for one term and subsequently ran for the state senate in 1977. In the 1977 election, Dorsey faced incumbent Democrat Stephen B. Wiley, who had been one of the prime sponsors of the Public School Education Act of 1975, which expanded state aid to public school districts. Dorsey had served in the Assembly on the Taxation Committee and was an opponent of the state income tax bill that Wiley had supported. Wiley's support of the income tax was one of Dorsey's key campaign issues. Dorsey went on to win the Senate seat by a 43.3%-45.7% margin.

After the 1991 elections, with the Republicans taking control of the Senate, Dorsey had hoped to step up from being minority leader to Senate president but was defeated by Donald DiFrancesco for the post of Senate president and became Republican majority leader instead. Both DiFrancesco and Dorsey had actively lobbied candidates running for office, making contributions and offers of committee chairmanships to individuals who might provide support in the race for Senate president.

Dorsey made efforts in 1993 to block Governor of New Jersey James Florio's reappointment of Judge Marianne Espinosa Murphy of the Family Court. Dorsey invoked "senatorial courtesy", an unwritten rule under which Senators from a gubernatorial appointee's home county can block consideration of a candidate from that county. Dorsey indicated that he had received complaints about Judge Murphy that she "giggles and throws pencils on the desk during testimony", though she was viewed as a model judge by an advocacy group for custodial parents who said that she would actively enforce judgments against deadbeat parents and was endorsed by the New Jersey State Bar Association, which had had a longstanding objection to the use of senatorial courtesy.

In the 1993 elections, Dorsey was originally being challenged in the Republican primary by political newcomer and attorney Chris Christie. However, Dorsey successfully challenged enough of Christie's petition signatures to have Christie removed from the ballot. In the general election, he was one of three Republican senators to lose their seats in the 1993 general election, falling to Democratic former Assemblymember Gordon MacInnes, whom he had defeated in 1975, by 607 votes. His loss was attributed to his use of senatorial courtesy to block Judge Murphy. Regardless of his departure from the senate, Dorsey has been viewed as a success in his political career and law career.

He died on December 16, 2018, in Pequannock Township, New Jersey at age 80.

New Jersey General Assembly
Preceded by Gordon MacInnes; Rosemarie Totaro	Member of the New Jersey General Assembly from the 23rd district January 13, 1976–January 10, 1978	Succeeded by Rosemarie Totaro
New Jersey Senate
Preceded by Stephen B. Wiley	Member of the New Jersey Senate from the 23rd district January 10, 1978–January 12, 1982	Succeeded by Walter E. Foran
Preceded by James Wallwork	Member of the New Jersey Senate from the 25th district January 12, 1982–January 11, 1994	Succeeded by Gordon MacInnes
