= Kenneth Welch =

Kenneth W. Welch (July 22, 1925 – November 17, 2006) was an American Republican Party politician who served as Mayor of Livingston, New Jersey, and in the administration of Governor Thomas Kean as Chairman of the New Jersey Violent Crimes Victims Compensation Board.

Welch spent four years in the U.S. Navy during World War II and was in the U.S. Naval Reserves from 1946 to 1954. He was elected to the Livingston Township Council in 1966 and re-elected in 1970, and served as Mayor of Livingston three times. He served as a Deputy Sheriff from 1960 to 1969, and as Purchasing Director of Essex County, New Jersey from 1970 to 1974. He was defeated in his bid for re-election to a third term in 1974. He later served as First Essex County Undersheriff from 1980 to 1982, when Kean appointed him to the state post. Following his confirmation by the State Senate, he took office in 1982 and served until 1992.
