= 2019 New Jersey elections =

- November 5, 2019

A general election was held in the U.S. state of New Jersey on November 5, 2019. Primary elections were held on June 4. The only state positions that were up in this election cycle were all 80 seats in the New Jersey General Assembly and one Senate special election in the 1st Legislative District. In addition to the State Legislative elections, numerous county offices and freeholders in addition to municipal offices were up for election. There was one statewide question on the ballot in 2019, and some counties and municipalities may have had a local question asked. Non-partisan local elections, some school board elections, and some fire district elections also happened in 2019.

== State legislature ==
=== State Senate special elections ===
One special election was held in the 1st Legislative District to complete the unexpired term of Jeff Van Drew. Van Drew resigned on January 2, 2019, following his election to Congress. On January 7, Democratic committee members in Atlantic, Cape May, and Cumberland counties selected Assemblyman Bob Andrzejczak as the appointed replacement, and he was sworn in on January 15. Andrzejczak was later defeated in the special election in November by Republican Mike Testa.

An additional vacancy in the State Senate was created by the September 2019 death of Anthony Bucco. The deadline for a 2019 special election having passed, a special election will be held in 2020 pending which his son Tony Bucco was appointed by a party convention to hold the seat on an interim basis.

==== Democratic primary ====
Declared

- Bob Andrzejczak, appointed incumbent senator

1st Legislative District Democratic Primary
Party	Candidate	Votes	%
Democratic	Bob Andrzejczak	4,925	100
Total votes		4,925	100

==== Republican primary ====
Declared

- Mike Testa, Chairman of the Cumberland County Republican Party

Withdrew

- Sam Fiocchi, former state assemblyman and candidate for NJ-2 in 2018

1st Legislative District Republican primary
Party	Candidate	Votes	%
Republican	Mike Testa	5,687	100
Total votes		5,687	100

==== General election ====
Results

1st Legislative District general election
Party	Candidate	Votes	%	±%
Republican	Mike Testa	27,163	53.5	▲19.5
Democratic	Bob Andrzejczak	23,636	46.5	▼18.3
Total votes		50,799	100.0	
Republican gain from Democratic				

=== General Assembly ===
2019 New Jersey General Assembly election
- November 5, 2019

All 80 seats in the New Jersey General Assembly 41 seats needed for a majority
	Majority party	Minority party
Leader	Craig Coughlin	Jon Bramnick
Party	Democratic	Republican
Leader since	January 9, 2018	January 17, 2012
Leader's seat	19th	21st
Last election	54	26
Seats won	52	28
Seat change	▼2	▲2
Popular vote	474,160	304,101
Percentage	60.93%	39.07%
Swing	▲2.85pp	▼2.28pp
- Results: Democratic hold Republican hold Republican gain
Speaker before election
Craig Coughlin
Democratic
Elected Speaker
Craig Coughlin
Democratic

The 2019 Elections for New Jersey's General Assembly was held on November 5, 2019. All 80 seats in the Assembly were up for election. The candidates that won in November will be part of the 219th New Jersey Legislature.

All 80 seats of the New Jersey General Assembly were up for election. Democrats held a 54–26 supermajority in the lower house prior to the election. The members of the New Jersey Legislature are chosen from 40 electoral districts. Each district elects one state senator and two State Assembly members. New Jersey uses coterminous legislative districts for both its State Senate and General Assembly.

Going into the 2019 election, every legislative district was represented by two Assembly members of the same party. This was maintained afterward, as Republicans flipped both seats in the 1st district.

==== Summary of Results ====
Parties	Candidates	Seats				Popular Vote		
Parties	Candidates	2017	2019	+/-	Strength	Vote	%	Change
Democratic	80	54	52	▼2	62.50%	1,644,511	55.3%	▼2.8pp
Republican	76	26	28	▲2	37.50%	1,312,532	44.1%	▲2.7pp
Legalize Marijuana	2	0	0	Steady	0%	4,130	0.1%	N/A
Libertarian	1	0	0	Steady	0%	568	0.02%	▼0.05pp
Independent	13	0	0	Steady	0%	13,189	0.4%	▲0.1pp
Total	172	80	80	0	100.0%	2,974,930	100.0%	-

== Ballot measures ==
One statewide question was on the ballot which was approved by voters:

- Public Question Number 1, Extends veterans' property tax deduction to continuing care retirement communities providing housing to veterans.

Question 1 Results by county Yes: 80–90%; 70–80%; 60–70%
