= Raymond A. Batten =

American politician

Member of the New Jersey House of Representatives from the 1st district
- In office April 21, 1991 – January 16, 1992
- Preceded by: Edward H. Salmon
- Succeeded by: John C. Gibson

Personal details
- Party: Democratic
- Education: Princeton University, Widener University
- Profession: Lawyer

Raymond A. Batten is an American politician and attorney from New Jersey who served in the New Jersey General Assembly for the 1st district from April 1991 to January, 1992.

== Biography ==
=== Early life ===
Batten was born in 1954. Batten graduated from Princeton University with a BA, and from Widener University's Delaware Law School with a Juris Doctor. Batten served as the municipal prosecutor in Sea Isle City and was the planning board solicitor in Dennis Township, and as municipal solicitor in Wildwood and Middle Township.

=== State assembly ===
During the 1985 election Batten would win the Democratic Primary with 3,314 votes alongside Peter L. Amico to face off against the Republican Slate of Guy F. Muziani and Joseph W. Chinnici, however, would lose the general election.

In the 1987 election Batten would stand for the Democratic primaries for the first district, however, would narrowly lose to Edward H. Salmon with 3,202 votes to Salmon's 3,307 votes.

Batten would again win the Democratic nomination in the 1989 election which would see the Republicans and Democrats split the district, with Batten's running mate Edward H. Salmon winning election with 35,715 votes, but Republican Frank LoBiondo won the other seat with 32,600 votes, leaving Batten short in third place with 31,193 votes.

From April 21, 1991 to January 16, 1992, Batten served in the New Jersey General Assembly representing the 1st district. He was appointed to the office to replace Edward H. Salmon who resigned early to serve on the New Jersey Board of Public Utilities. Batten and fellow Democrat Jennifer R. Lockwood, would lose the 1991 election to Republicans Frank LoBiondo and John C. Gibson.

=== Judicial career ===
In 1992 Batten was named to the New Jersey Superior Court by Governor James Florio. In 1999 Batten was reappointed to the Superior Court by Governor Todd Whitman. A specialist in family court, he disposed of more than 73,400 Family Part cases, 10,500 Criminal Part cases, 1170 Chancery cases, and 340 adoptions during his career as a judge.

=== Private sector ===
Batten retired in 2015 and joined the firm Archer & Greiner as an attorney.

== Personal life ==
Batten married Mary Frances Boles and the couple have three children, Alexis, Bryna, and Dylan.
