= 219th New Jersey Legislature =

2020 to 2021 legislative session

| ← | 218th Legislature | 220th Legislature | → |
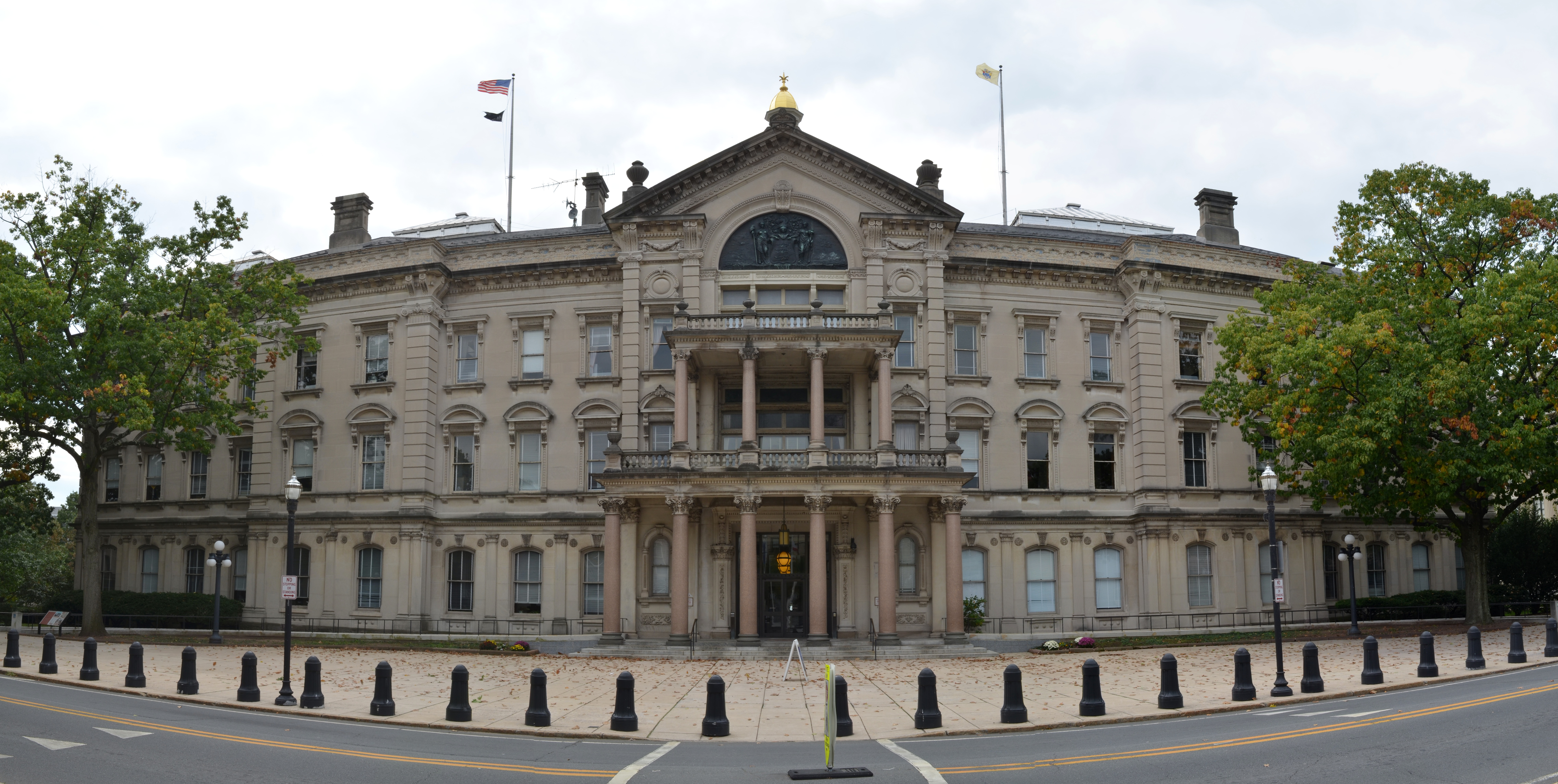
- New Jersey State House north panorama, 2012

Overview
- Legislative body: New Jersey Legislature
- Jurisdiction: New Jersey, United States
- Term: January 14, 2020 – January 11, 2022

New Jersey Senate
- Members: 40
- President: Stephen Sweeney
- Minority Leader: Thomas Kean Jr.
- Party control: Democratic Party

New Jersey General Assembly
- Members: 80
- Speaker: Craig Coughlin
- Minority Leader: Jon Bramnick
- Party control: Democratic Party

The 219th New Jersey Legislature began on January 14, 2020, following the 2019 elections for Assembly, and one special election for Senate. It ended on January 11, 2022.

== Background ==
Elections will be held in November 2019 for all 80 seats in the Assembly and one Senate seat. After Senator Jeff Van Drew resigned to join The United States House of Representatives Assemblyman Bob Andrzejczak was appointed to fill his seat, creating a special election to be held in November 2019. Cumberland County Republican Chairman Mike Testa, and former Assemblyman Sam Fiocchi announced their intentions to run for the republican nomination for senate in the 1st District. In the Assembly, as of March 30, 2019, Assemblymen David Wolfe, Michael Patrick Carroll, and Assemblywomen Amy Handlin, Patricia Egan Jones have all announced their planned retirement from the Assembly. During the June primaries 8th District Assemblyman Joe Howarth lost to former Burlington County Sheriff Jean Stanfield.

The Senate seat vacated by the September 2019 death of Anthony Bucco will be filled first by an interim appointment and then by a special election in 2020.

== Composition ==
=== Assembly ===
| Affiliation | Members |
|---|---|
| Democratic Party | 52 |
| Republican Party | 28 |
| Total | 80 |

=== Senate ===
| Affiliation | Members |
|---|---|
| Democratic Party | 25 |
| Republican Party | 15 |
| Total | 40 |

== Leadership ==
=== Senate ===
| Democratic Leadership | Republican Leadership |
|---|---|
| Senate President, Steve Sweeney; Majority Leader, Loretta Weinberg; President Pro-Tempore, Teresa Ruiz; Conference Chair, Vin Gopal | Minority Leader, Tom Kean, Jr.; Deputy Minority Leader, Bob Singer; Minority Whip, Joe Pennacchio; Conference Chair, Kristin Corrado |

=== Assembly ===
| Democratic Leadership | Republican Leadership |
|---|---|
| Senate President, Craig Coughlin; Majority Leader, Louis Greenwald; Speaker Pro-Tempore, Gordon M. Johnson; Conference Chair, Annette Quijano | Minority Leader, Jon Bramnick; Deputy Minority Leaders, Ronald S. Dancer, Holly Schepisi, BettyLou DeCroce; Minority Whip, Ned Thompson; Conference Chair, Nancy Munoz, John DiMaio |

== Members ==
=== Senate ===
The Senate has 40 members, one for each district.

| District | Name | Party | Residence | First served |
|---|---|---|---|---|
| District 1 | Mike Testa | Rep | Vineland | 2019 ‡ |
| District 2 | Vincent J. Polistina | Rep | Egg Harbor Township | 2021 † |
| District 3 | Stephen Sweeney | Dem | West Deptford Township | 2002 |
| District 4 | Fred H. Madden | Dem | Washington Township (Gloucester) | 2004 |
| District 5 | Nilsa Cruz-Perez | Dem | Barrington | 2014 † |
| District 6 | James Beach | Dem | Voorhees Township | 2009 † |
| District 7 | Troy Singleton | Dem | Palmyra | 2018 |
| District 8 | Dawn Marie Addiego | Dem* | Evesham Township | 2010 † |
| District 9 | Christopher J. Connors | Rep | Lacey Township | 2008 |
| District 10 | James W. Holzapfel | Rep | Toms River | 2012 |
| District 11 | Vin Gopal | Dem | Long Branch | 2018 |
| District 12 | Samuel D. Thompson | Rep | Old Bridge Township | 2012 |
| District 13 | Declan O'Scanlon | Rep | Little Silver | 2018 |
| District 14 | Linda R. Greenstein | Dem | Plainsboro Township | 2010 ‡ |
| District 15 | Shirley Turner | Dem | Lawrence Township (Mercer) | 1998 |
| District 16 | Christopher "Kip" Bateman | Rep | Branchburg | 2008 |
| District 17 | Bob Smith | Dem | Piscataway | 2002 |
| District 18 | Patrick J. Diegnan | Dem | South Plainfield | 2016 † |
| District 19 | Joe Vitale | Dem | Woodbridge Township | 1998 |
| District 20 | Joseph Cryan | Dem | Union Township (Union) | 2018 |
| District 21 | Thomas Kean Jr. | Rep | Westfield | 2003 † |
| District 22 | Nicholas Scutari | Dem | Linden | 2004 |
| District 23 | Michael J. Doherty | Rep | Washington Township (Warren) | 2009 ‡ |
| District 24 | Steve Oroho | Rep | Franklin | 2008 |
| District 25 | Anthony M. Bucco | Rep | Boonton Township | 2019 † |
| District 26 | Joseph Pennacchio | Rep | Montville | 2008 |
| District 27 | Richard Codey | Dem | Roseland | 1982 |
| District 28 | Ronald Rice | Dem | Newark | 1986 ‡ |
| District 29 | Teresa Ruiz | Dem | Newark | 2008 |
| District 30 | Robert Singer | Rep | Lakewood Township | 1993 † |
| District 31 | Sandra Bolden Cunningham | Dem | Jersey City | 2007 † |
| District 32 | Nicholas Sacco | Dem | North Bergen | 1994 |
| District 33 | Brian P. Stack | Dem | Union City | 2008 |
| District 34 | Nia Gill | Dem | Montclair | 2002 |
| District 35 | Nellie Pou | Dem | North Haledon | 2012 |
| District 36 | Paul Sarlo | Dem | Wood-Ridge | 2003 † |
| District 37 | Vacant | Dem | | N/A |
| District 38 | Joseph Lagana | Dem | Paramus | 2018 † |
| District 39 | Holly Schepisi | Rep | River Vale | 2021 † |
| District 40 | Kristin Corrado | Rep | Totowa | 2017 † |

==== Former members from this term ====
| District | Name | Party | Residence | First served | Left office | Cause | Replaced by |
|---|---|---|---|---|---|---|---|
| District 39 | Gerald Cardinale | Rep | Demarest | 1982 | February 20, 2021 | Death (brief illness) | Holly Schepisi |
| District 2 | Chris A. Brown | Rep | Ventnor City | 2018 | July 19, 2021 | Resigned to accept a position at the New Jersey Department of Community Affairs | Vincent J. Polistina |
| District 37 | Loretta Weinberg | Dem | Teaneck | 2005 † | January 7, 2022 | Appointed to the Board of Directors of Horizon Blue Cross Blue Shield of New Jersey | N/A^{1} |

† First appointed to the seat
‡ Elected in a special election
* Addiego had served as a Republican prior to 2019
^{1} Seat remained vacant for remainder of term

=== Assembly ===
The Assembly has 80 members, two for each district.

| District | Name | Party | Residence | First served |
|---|---|---|---|---|
| District 1 | Antwan McClellan | Rep | Ocean City | 2020 |
| District 1 | Erik Simonsen | Rep | Lower Township | 2020 |
| District 2 | John Armato | Dem | Buena Vista Township | 2018 |
| District 2 | Vince Mazzeo | Dem | Northfield | 2014 |
| District 3 | John J. Burzichelli | Dem | Paulsboro | 2002 |
| District 3 | Adam Taliaferro | Dem | Woolwich Township | 2015 † |
| District 4 | Paul Moriarty | Dem | Washington Township (Gloucester) | 2006 |
| District 4 | Gabriela Mosquera | Dem | Gloucester Township | 2012 † |
| District 5 | Bill Moen | Dem | Camden | 2020 |
| District 5 | William Spearman | Dem | Camden | 2018 † |
| District 6 | Louis Greenwald | Dem | Voorhees Township | 1996 |
| District 6 | Pamela Rosen Lampitt | Dem | Cherry Hill | 2006 |
| District 7 | Herb Conaway | Dem | Delran Township | 1998 |
| District 7 | Carol A. Murphy | Dem | Mount Laurel | 2018 |
| District 8 | Ryan Peters | Rep | Hainesport Township | 2018 |
| District 8 | Jean Stanfield | Rep | Westampton | 2020 |
| District 9 | DiAnne Gove | Rep | Long Beach Township | 2009 † |
| District 9 | Brian E. Rumpf | Rep | Little Egg Harbor | 2003 † |
| District 10 | John Catalano | Rep | Brick Township | 2020 |
| District 10 | Gregory P. McGuckin | Rep | Toms River | 2012 |
| District 11 | Joann Downey | Dem | Freehold Township | 2016 |
| District 11 | Eric Houghtaling | Dem | Neptune Township | 2016 |
| District 12 | Robert D. Clifton | Rep | Matawan | 2012 |
| District 12 | Ronald S. Dancer | Rep | Plumsted Township | 2002 † |
| District 13 | Serena DiMaso | Rep | Holmdel Township | 2018 |
| District 13 | Gerard Scharfenberger | Rep | Middletown Township | 2020 |
| District 14 | Daniel R. Benson | Dem | Hamilton Township (Mercer) | 2011 † |
| District 14 | Wayne DeAngelo | Dem | Hamilton Township (Mercer) | 2008 |
| District 15 | Verlina Reynolds-Jackson | Dem | Trenton | 2018 † |
| District 15 | Anthony Verrelli | Dem | Hopewell Township (Mercer) | 2018 † |
| District 16 | Roy Freiman | Dem | Hillsborough Township | 2018 |
| District 16 | Andrew Zwicker | Dem | South Brunswick | 2016 |
| District 17 | Joseph Danielsen | Dem | Franklin Township (Somerset) | 2014 † |
| District 17 | Joseph V. Egan | Dem | New Brunswick | 2002 |
| District 18 | Robert Karabinchak | Dem | Edison | 2016 † |
| District 18 | Sterley Stanley | Dem | East Brunswick | 2021 † |
| District 19 | Craig Coughlin | Dem | Woodbridge Township | 2010 |
| District 19 | Yvonne Lopez | Dem | Perth Amboy | 2018 |
| District 20 | Jamel Holley | Dem | Roselle | 2015 † |
| District 20 | Annette Quijano | Dem | Elizabeth | 2008 † |
| District 21 | Jon Bramnick | Rep | Westfield | 2003 † |
| District 21 | Nancy Munoz | Rep | Summit | 2009 † |
| District 22 | Linda Carter | Dem | Plainfield | 2018 † |
| District 22 | James J. Kennedy | Dem | Rahway | 2016 |
| District 23 | John DiMaio | Rep | Hackettstown | 2009 † |
| District 23 | Erik Peterson | Rep | Franklin Township (Hunterdon) | 2009 † |
| District 24 | Parker Space | Rep | Wantage Township | 2013 † |
| District 24 | Harold J. Wirths | Rep | Hardyston Township | 2018 |
| District 25 | Brian Bergen | Rep | Denville | 2020 |
| District 25 | Aura K. Dunn | Rep | Mendham Borough | 2019 ‡ |
| District 26 | BettyLou DeCroce | Rep | Parsippany-Troy Hills | 2012 † |
| District 26 | Jay Webber | Rep | Morris Plains | 2008 |
| District 27 | Mila Jasey | Dem | South Orange | 2007 † |
| District 27 | John F. McKeon | Dem | West Orange | 2002 |
| District 28 | Ralph R. Caputo | Dem* | Bloomfield | 2008* |
| District 28 | Cleopatra Tucker | Dem | Newark | 2008 |
| District 29 | Eliana Pintor Marin | Dem | Newark | 2013 † |
| District 29 | Shanique Speight | Dem | Newark | 2018 |
| District 30 | Sean T. Kean | Rep | Wall Township | 2012 ± |
| District 30 | Ned Thomson | Rep | Wall Township | 2017 † |
| District 31 | Nicholas Chiaravalloti | Dem | Bayonne | 2016 |
| District 31 | Angela V. McKnight | Dem | Jersey City | 2016 |
| District 32 | Angelica M. Jimenez | Dem | West New York | 2012 |
| District 32 | Pedro Mejia | Dem | Secaucus | 2018 † |
| District 33 | Annette Chaparro | Dem | Hoboken | 2016 |
| District 33 | Raj Mukherji | Dem | Jersey City | 2014 |
| District 34 | Thomas P. Giblin | Dem | Montclair | 2006 |
| District 34 | Britnee Timberlake | Dem | East Orange | 2018 † |
| District 35 | Shavonda E. Sumter | Dem | Paterson | 2012 |
| District 35 | Benjie Wimberly | Dem | Paterson | 2012 |
| District 36 | Clinton Calabrese | Dem | Cliffside Park | 2018 † |
| District 36 | Gary Schaer | Dem | Passaic | 2006 |
| District 37 | Valerie Huttle | Dem | Englewood | 2006 |
| District 37 | Gordon M. Johnson | Dem | Englewood | 2002 |
| District 38 | Lisa Swain | Dem | Fair Lawn | 2018 † |
| District 38 | Chris Tully | Dem | Bergenfield | 2018 † |
| District 39 | Robert Auth | Rep | Old Tappan | 2014 |
| District 39 | DeAnne DeFuccio | Rep | Upper Saddle River | 2021 † |
| District 40 | Christopher DePhillips | Rep | Wyckoff | 2018 |
| District 40 | Kevin J. Rooney | Rep | Wyckoff | 2016 † |

† First appointed to the seat
‡ Dunn was appointed to the seat in November 2019. The appointment expired at the conclusion of the 2018–19 term in January 2020. She was reappointed again in February 2020 after the start of the next term, and then won the seat in a special election in November 2020.
± Kean previously served in the Assembly from 2002–2008
* Caputo had served as a Republican during a previous stint in the Assembly from 1968–1972

==== Former members from this term ====
| District | Name | Party | Residence | First served | Left office | Cause | Replaced by |
|---|---|---|---|---|---|---|---|
| District 18 | Nancy Pinkin | Dem | East Brunswick | 2014 | December 31, 2020 | Elected Middlesex County Clerk | Sterley Stanley |
| District 39 | Holly Schepisi | Rep | River Vale | 2012 | March 25, 2021 | Appointed to the District's Senate seat | DeAnne DeFuccio |

== See also ==
- List of New Jersey state legislatures
