= John C. Gibson =

American politician

Member of the New Jersey General Assembly from the 1st district
- In office January 13, 2004 – January 10, 2006 Serving with Jeff Van Drew
- Preceded by: Nicholas Asselta
- Succeeded by: Nelson Albano
- In office January 14, 1992 – January 8, 2002 Serving with Frank LoBiondo and Nicholas Asselta
- Preceded by: Raymond A. Batten
- Succeeded by: Jeff Van Drew

Personal details
- Born: March 30, 1934 (age 92) Atlantic City, New Jersey, U.S.
- Party: Republican
- Education: Villanova University (BCE)

John C. "Jack" Gibson (born March 30, 1934) is an American Republican politician, who served in the New Jersey General Assembly where he represented the 1st Legislative District from 2004 to 2006. Gibson also served in the Assembly from 1992 to 2002. He served in the Assembly on the Agriculture and Natural Resources and the Transportation Committees.

On election day, November 8, 2005, incumbent Assemblyman Gibson was ousted by Democrat Nelson Albano, in the politically split 1st District, which covers Cape May County and portions of Cumberland County.

Gibson has served on the New Jersey Beach Erosion Commission from 1994 to 2002 (as its chair in 1998) and on the Atlantic States Marine Fisheries Commission from 2001 to 2002. He was a member of the Sea Isle City Board of Education from 1969 to 1973 and of the Cape May County Planning Board from 1962 to 1971.

John C. Gibson graduated with a B.C.E. in Civil Engineering from Villanova University.

== District 1 ==
Each of the forty districts in the New Jersey Legislature has one representative in the New Jersey Senate and two members in the New Jersey General Assembly. The other representatives from the 1st Legislative District for the 2004-2006 session were:

- Assemblyman Jeff Van Drew, and
- Senator Nicholas Asselta
