= James Cafiero =

American politician (1928–2023)

Majority Whip of the New Jersey Senate
- In office January 8, 2002 – January 14, 2004; Co-Leadership with John Girgenti until January 14, 2004
- Preceded by: Diane Allen
- Succeeded by: John Girgenti

Minority Leader of the New Jersey Senate
- In office January 13, 1976 – January 10, 1978
- Preceded by: Alfred N. Beadleston
- Succeeded by: Garrett W. Hagedorn

Member of the New Jersey Senate from the 1st district
- In office January 9, 1990 – January 14, 2004
- Preceded by: James R. Hurley
- Succeeded by: Nicholas Asselta
- In office January 11, 1972 – January 12, 1982
- Preceded by: Robert E. Kay
- Succeeded by: James R. Hurley

Member of the New Jersey General Assembly from the 1st district
- In office January 9, 1968 – January 11, 1972
- Preceded by: District created
- Succeeded by: Joseph W. Chinnici

Personal details
- Born: September 21, 1928 North Wildwood, New Jersey, U.S.
- Died: August 3, 2023 (aged 94)
- Party: Republican
- Parent: Anthony J. Cafiero (father)
- Education: Princeton University (BA); University of Pennsylvania (JD)

James S. Cafiero (September 21, 1928 – August 3, 2023) was an American attorney and Republican Party politician who served in the New Jersey General Assembly from 1968 to 1972 and in the New Jersey Senate from 1972 to 1982 and from 1990 to 2004, where he represented the 1st legislative district.

== Early life and education ==
James Cafiero was born on September 21, 1928. His father, attorney and judge Anthony J. Cafiero, later represented Cape May County in the Senate from 1948 to 1954.

Cafiero graduated from The Lawrenceville School and earned a Bachelor of Arts in economics from Princeton University in 1950 and a Juris Doctor from the University of Pennsylvania Law School in 1953. After law school, Cafiero worked as an assistant Cape May County prosecutor from 1958 to 1960 and as an attorney at his father's firm.

== Political career ==
=== New Jersey Assembly ===
Following the United States Supreme Court's decision in Reynolds v. Sims and a special constitutional convention, a new legislative district was created in 1967 consisting of Cape May and Cumberland counties. While serving as assistant prosecutor, Cafiero ran for the General Assembly on a victorious Republican ticket with Robert Kay for Senate and James R. Hurley of Millville for Assembly. They were re-elected in 1969.

=== New Jersey Senate ===
==== 1972 to 1982 ====
In 1971, Kay lost the support of the Cape May County Republican Party for a second term. Cafiero and Hurley both prepared to run for Senate, while Kay threatened to stand for the nomination without party support. After the Cumberland and Cape May party chairs reached a deal to nominate Cafiero for Senate and Joseph Chinnici as Hurley's running mate for Assembly, Kay withdrew. Cafiero won the general election against former Millville commissioner Paul Porreca by only 916 votes, with the result split along county lines. As a freshman Senator, Cafiero chaired the Appropriations Committee, making him the third most powerful member of the legislature. He was named Senate Minority Leader in 1975, replacing Alfred N. Beadleston. He was re-elected easily in 1973 (though Republicans lost the Senate) and 1977 before leaving party leadership in 1978 and stepping down in 1981. He was succeeded by Hurley.

==== 1990 to 2004 ====
In 1991, Cafiero returned to the Senate after Hurley retired to join the New Jersey Casino Control Commission. He defeated Assemblyman Edward Salmon amid growing opposition to Governor Jim Florio's tax increases. In 1991, he was re-elected by a large margin as part of a Republican wave which retook both houses of the legislature. He won easily in 1993 and 1997 before facing William J. Hughes Jr., the son of U.S. Representative and Ambassador William J. Hughes, in 2001. Cafiero defeated Hughes by just 441 votes, which proved decisive in creating a 20-20 tie in the Senate and a power-sharing arrangement between the Republican and Democratic parties. He retired for a second time in 2003 and was succeeded by Nicholas Asselta, who had considered challenging Cafiero in the primary.

In 1996, Cafiero introduced a bill that would dedicate a portion of the special sales tax collected for the Wildwoods to be used for the construction of a minor league stadium that would have room for 5,000 fans. He served in the Senate on the Judiciary Committee and the Law and Public Safety and Veterans' Affairs Committee. Cafiero was Republican Whip from 2002 to 2004.

== Personal life and death ==
Cafiero was a resident of North Wildwood. He died on August 3, 2023, at the age of 94.

New Jersey General Assembly
Preceded by Constituency established	Member of the New Jersey General Assembly from the 1st district 1968–1972	Succeeded by Joseph W. Chinnici
New Jersey Senate
Preceded by Robert E. Kay	Member of the New Jersey Senate from the 1st district 1972–1982	Succeeded by James R. Hurley
Preceded by Alfred N. Beadleston	Minority Leader of the New Jersey Senate; 1976–1978	Succeeded by Garrett W. Hagedorn
Preceded by James R. Hurley	Member of the New Jersey Senate from the 1st district 1990–2004	Succeeded by Nicholas Asselta
Preceded by Diane Allen	Majority Whip of the New Jersey Senate; 2002–2004; With: John Girgenti	Succeeded by John Girgenti
