= Erik K. Simonsen =

Member of the New Jersey General Assembly

Erik Simonsen

Member of the New Jersey General Assembly from the 1st district
- Incumbent
- Assumed office January 14, 2020 Serving with Antwan McClellan
- Preceded by: R. Bruce Land; Matthew W. Milam

Mayor of Lower Township
- In office 2016–2020
- Preceded by: Michael Beck
- Succeeded by: Frank Sippel

Member of the Lower Township Council from the 3rd ward
- In office November 11, 2013 – 2016
- Preceded by: Jackie Henderson
- Succeeded by: Roland A. Roy, Jr.

Member of the Lower Township Council from the 2nd ward
- In office 2011
- Preceded by: Wayne Mazurek
- Succeeded by: Walt Craig

Personal details
- Born: 1968 or 1969 (age 57–58)
- Party: Republican
- Education: The College of New Jersey; Rutgers University; University of Scranton
- Website: Legislative Webpage

Erik K. Simonsen (born 1968 or 1969) is an American musician and Republican Party politician who has represented the 1st Legislative District in the New Jersey General Assembly since January 14, 2020, after defeating incumbent Assemblymen R. Bruce Land and Matthew W. Milam in the 2019 general election. Simonsen served as Mayor of Lower Township from 2016 until 2020.

Simonsen is the athletic director at Lower Cape May Regional High School.

== New Jersey Assembly ==
Simonsen ran as a team with Mike Testa for Senate and Antwan McClellan for Assembly. During the campaign, the team made immigration and taxes a key part of their campaign. He, alongside Testa and McClellan, ousted the 1st District's legislators, Senator Bob Andrzejczak, Assemblymen R. Bruce Land and Matthew W. Milam. Their victories were the only gains Republicans made in the 2019 New Jersey elections.

=== Tenure ===
Simonsen was sworn into office on January 14, 2020, when the 219th New Jersey Legislature convened.

=== Committee assignments ===
- Community Development and Affairs
- Education
- State and Local Government
- Joint Committee on the Public Schools

=== District 1 ===
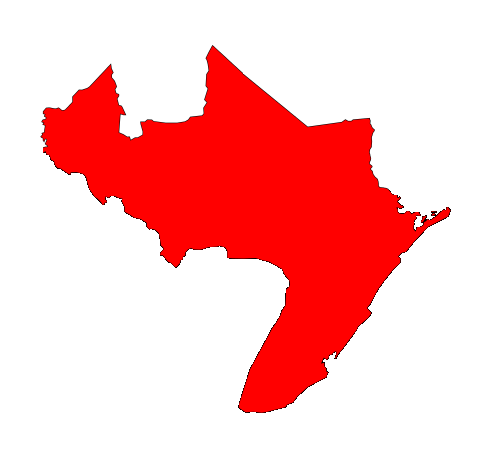
New Jersey Legislative District 1

New Jersey's 1st Legislative District encompasses parts of Atlantic County, Cumberland County, and all of Cape May County. Each of the 40 districts in the New Jersey Legislature has one representative in the New Jersey Senate and two members in the New Jersey General Assembly. The representatives from the 1st District for the 2024—2025 Legislative Session are:

- Senator Mike Testa (R)
- Assemblyman Antwan McClellan (R)
- Assemblyman Erik K. Simonsen (R)

== Electoral history ==
=== General Assembly ===
1st Legislative District General Election, 2023
Party	Candidate	Votes	%
Republican	Erik Simonsen (incumbent)	27,976	31.8
Republican	Antwan McClellan (incumbent)	27,603	31.3
Democratic	Damita White-Morris	16,257	18.5
Democratic	Eddie L. Bonner	16,228	18.4
Total votes		88,064	100.0
Republican hold			

1st legislative district general election, 2021
Party	Candidate	Votes	%
Republican	Erik Simonsen (incumbent)	40,803	31.61%
Republican	Antwan McClellan (incumbent)	40,405	31.30%
Democratic	John P. Capizola Jr.	23,818	18.45%
Democratic	Julia L. Hankerson	23,055	17.86%
Libertarian	Michael Gallo	589	0.46%
Libertarian	Jacob Selwood	399	0.31%
Total votes		129,069	100.00
Republican hold			

2019 New Jersey General Assembly election for the 1st Legislative District
Party	Candidate	Votes	%
Republican	Erik Simonsen	27,304	27.15%
Republican	Antwan McClellan	26,264	26.11%
Democratic	Bruce Land (Incumbent)	23,778	23.64%
Democratic	Matthew W. Milam (Incumbent)	23,234	23.10%
Total votes		100,508	100.0%

=== Lower Township Council ===
2016 Lower Township election for Mayor
Party	Candidate	Votes	%
Republican	Erik Simonsen	7,104	98.52%

2013 Lower Township special election for the 3rd ward
Party	Candidate	Votes	%
Republican	Erik Simonsen	1,390	61.67%
Independent	Glenn Douglass	473	20.98%
Independent	Thomas F. Will	329	14.60%
Independent	George F. Doherty	59	2.62%
Total votes		2,251	99.87%

2010 Lower Township election for the 2nd ward
Party	Candidate	Votes	%
Republican	Erik Simonsen	1,401	98.66%
