= James R. Hurley =

American politician (1932–2023)

Chairman of the New Jersey Casino Control Commission
- In office 1998–2002
- Preceded by: Bradford S. Smith
- Succeeded by: Linda M. Kassekert

Member of the New Jersey Senate from the 1st district
- In office January 12, 1982 – January 2, 1990
- Preceded by: James Cafiero
- Succeeded by: James Cafiero

Member of the New Jersey General Assembly from the 1st district
- In office January 9, 1968 – January 12, 1982 Serving with Joseph W. Chinnici
- Preceded by: District created
- Succeeded by: Guy F. Muziani

Personal details
- Born: January 29, 1932 Seaford, Delaware, U.S.
- Died: June 17, 2023 (aged 91)
- Party: Republican
- Spouse: Walda Hurley (m. 1952; died 2022)

James R. Hurley (January 29, 1932 – June 17, 2023) was an American Republican politician from Millville, New Jersey. He was a member of the New Jersey Legislature from 1968 to 1990, and had stints as the Republican leader in both houses.

== Career ==
Hurley served on Cumberland County's first Board of Chosen Freeholders. He was later elected a member of the New Jersey General Assembly, where he represented the 1st Legislative District from 1968 to 1982 and served as both Minority Leader and Majority Leader. In 1982 he was elevated to the New Jersey Senate where he served for a time as Minority Leader.

On January 2, 1990, Hurley stepped down from the Senate, after he was appointed a member of the New Jersey Casino Control Commission by Governor Thomas Kean. He was reappointed in 1992 by Governor James Florio and in 1997 by Governor Christine Todd Whitman. On October 29, 1998, he was appointed the commission's fifth Chairman and served in that capacity until 2002.

In 1976, Hurley made an unsuccessful run for the House of Representatives in New Jersey's 2nd congressional district against William J. Hughes, who had unseated the Republican incumbent in the previous election of 1974. However, Hughes defended his seat and convincingly won the election with 62% of the vote to Hurley's 38%.

As a state senator in August 1983, Hurley received a reprimand from a legislative ethics panel for accepting a $10,000 fee in a land deal between Wawa, Inc. and the state.

Outside politics Hurley worked in public relations and advertising. He created the non-profit Affordable Homes of Millville Ecumenical (AHOME) and served on its board of directors. In December 2010, Hurley was named AHOME's first Chairman Emeritus. The James R. Hurley Industrial Park in Millville is named for him.

== Personal life and death ==
Hurley was married to his wife, Walda, from 1952 until her death in 2022.

Hurley died June 17, 2023, at the age of 91.

Government offices
Preceded by Bradford S. Smith	Chair of the New Jersey Casino Control Commission; 1998–2002	Succeeded by Linda M. Kassekert
New Jersey Senate
Preceded by James Cafiero	Member of the New Jersey Senate from the 1st district 1982–1990	Succeeded by James Cafiero
New Jersey General Assembly
Preceded by District created	Member of the New Jersey General Assembly from the 1st district 1968–1982; Served alongside: James Cafiero, Joseph W. Chinnici	Succeeded by Guy F. Muziani
