= Edward H. Salmon =

American politician

Member of the New Jersey General Assembly from the 1st Legislative District
- In office January 12, 1988 – April 22, 1991
- Preceded by: Joseph W. Chinnici; Guy F. Muziani
- Succeeded by: Raymond A. Batten

Personal details
- Born: September 16, 1942 (age 84) York, Pennsylvania, U.S.
- Party: Democratic
- Spouse: Marilyn Groninger
- Children: two

Edward H. Salmon (born September 16, 1942) is an American Democratic Party politician who served in the New Jersey General Assembly from the 1st Legislative District from 1988 to 1991.

Born in York, Pennsylvania, he attended Gettysburg College graduating in 1964, earned a master's degree in 1971 from Glassboro State College (since renamed as Rowan University), and also attended the University of Delaware. He was a teacher, served as mayor of Millville, and served on the Cumberland County Board of Chosen Freeholders prior to his election to the Legislature in 1987.

Salmon was reelected in 1989 and served in the Assembly until April 1991 when he was appointed to the New Jersey Board of Public Utilities by Governor James Florio.
