= Nicholas Asselta =

American Republican Party politician

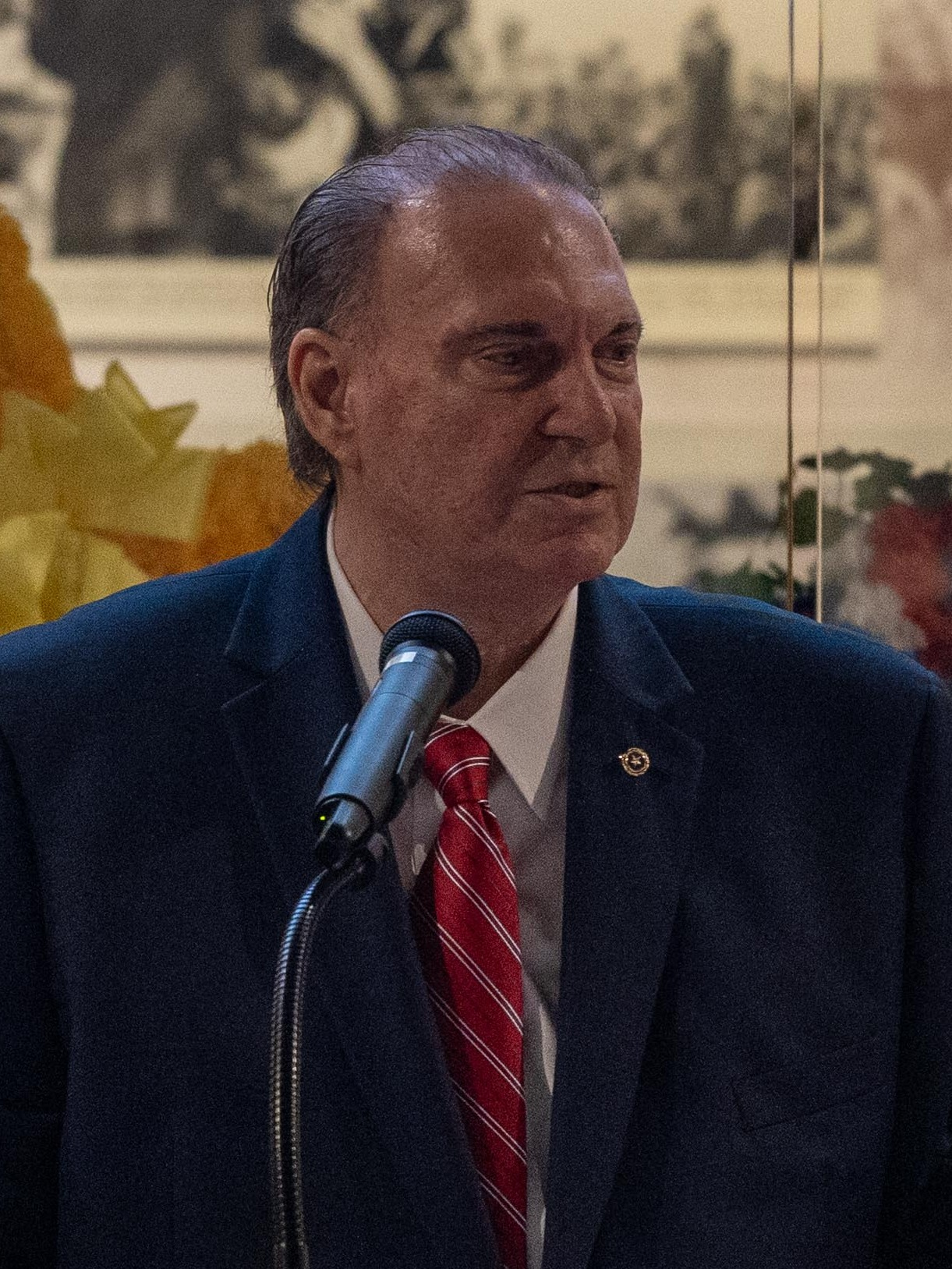
- Asselta speaking in 2026

Member of the New Jersey Senate from the 1st district
- In office January 14, 2004 – January 8, 2008
- Preceded by: James Cafiero
- Succeeded by: Jeff Van Drew

Member of the New Jersey General Assembly from the 1st district
- In office January 23, 1995 – January 14, 2004 Serving with John C. Gibson and Jeff Van Drew
- Preceded by: Frank LoBiondo
- Succeeded by: John C. Gibson

Personal details
- Born: August 17, 1951 (age 74) Vineland, New Jersey, U.S.
- Party: Republican

Nicholas Asselta (born August 17, 1951) is an American Republican Party politician, who served in the New Jersey Senate from 2004 to 2008, where he represented the 1st Legislative District. In the Senate, Asselta was a member of the Budget and Appropriations Committee, the Community and Urban Affairs Committee, the Health, Human Services and Senior Citizens Committee and the State Government Committee.

== Early life and education ==
Asselta grew up in Vineland, New Jersey, graduating from Vineland High School and Cumberland County College.

== Political career ==
On November 6, 2007, Asselta lost his re-election bid, having been ousted by Democratic Party New Jersey General Assembly member Jeff Van Drew. Before entering the Senate, Asselta served in the lower house, the New Jersey General Assembly, from 1995 to 2003. He served on the New Jersey Council on the Arts, a position he held since 1998, and was on the Vineland Public Schools Board of Education from 1993 to 1996, the Vineland Planning Board from 1992 to 1993, and the Vineland Environmental Commission 1992 to 1993.

Asselta implemented legislation that broadened the eligibility for Urban Enterprise Zones throughout the State and sponsored legislation making it more difficult for the State to close an institution where more than 100 jobs would be lost. Asselta fought for increased state aid for shore protection and beach replenishment. In January 2008, Governor Jon Corzine appointed Asselta to be a Commissioner of the New Jersey Board of Public Utilities, to replace Connie O. Hughes. The New Jersey State Senate confirmed Asselta on March 3, 2008.
