= Antwan McClellan =

Member of the New Jersey General Assembly

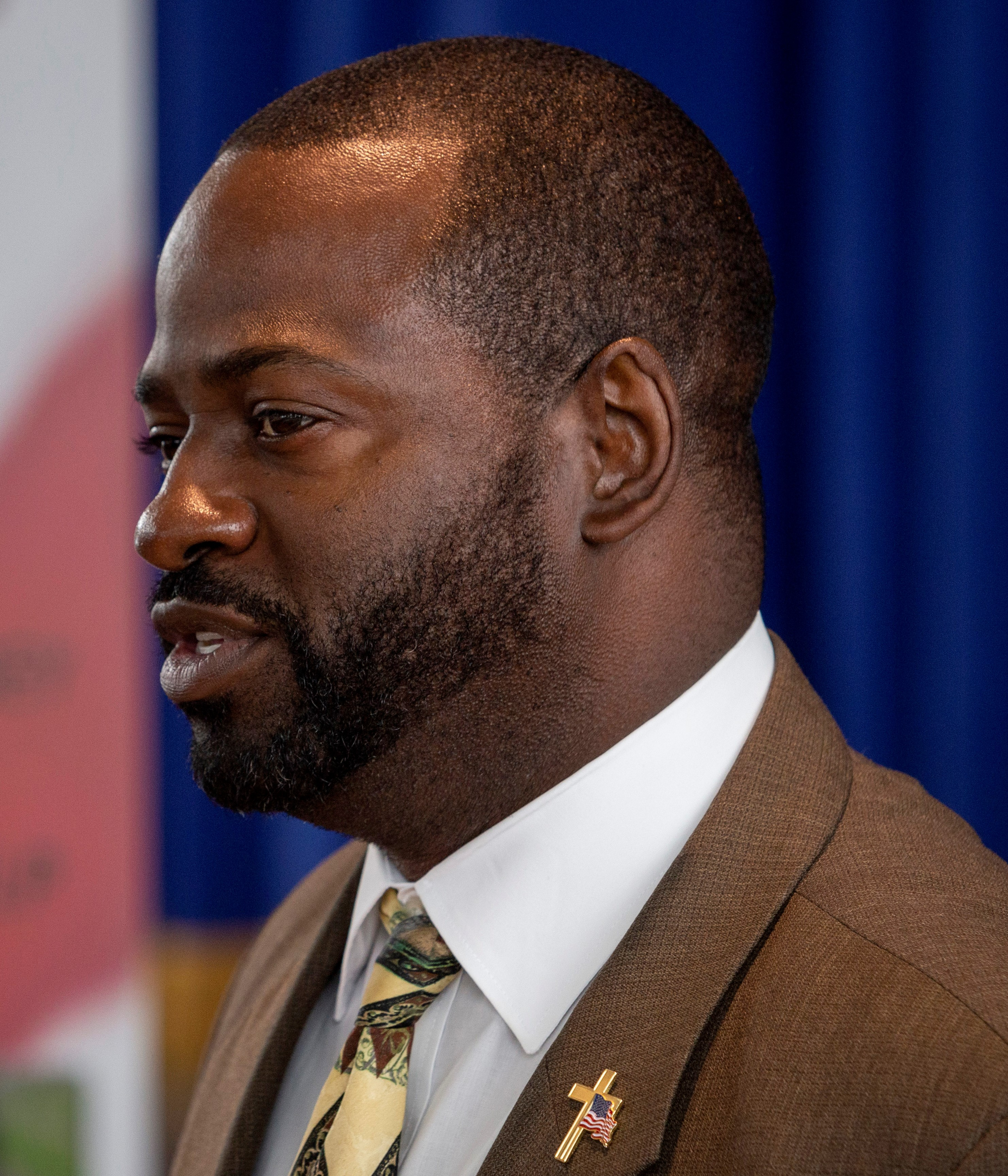

Member of the New Jersey General Assembly from the 1st district
- Incumbent
- Assumed office January 14, 2020 Serving with Erik K. Simonsen
- Preceded by: R. Bruce Land; Matthew W. Milam

Member of the Ocean City Council from the 2nd ward
- In office July 1, 2012 – January 14, 2020
- Preceded by: Kate Bergman
- Succeeded by: Tomaso Rotondi

Personal details
- Born: 1974 or 1975 (age 51–52) Ocean City, New Jersey, U.S.
- Party: Republican
- Education: Virginia State University; Old Dominion University
- Website: State Senate website

Antwan McClellan (born 1974/1975) is an American Republican Party politician who has represented the 1st Legislative District in the New Jersey General Assembly since January 14, 2020. McClellan served as a councilman in Ocean City, New Jersey from 2012 until 2020.

== Personal and early life ==
McClellan is a lifelong resident of Ocean City. He is the youngest of six siblings. He attended Ocean City High School as well as Virginia State University and Old Dominion University. McClellan serves as the Confidential Assistant/Personnel Director/Public Information Officer in the Cape May County Sheriff's Department. He was first elected to the Ocean City Council in 2012 and was re-elected in 2016. He has also served as a member of the board of education of the Ocean City School District, a trustee on the Ocean City Historical Museum and a volunteer for the South Jersey Field of Dreams.

== New Jersey Assembly ==
McClellan started his bid for Assembly in early 2019. He ran as a team alongside Mike Testa and Erik Simonsen. McClellan alongside Simonsen ousted incumbents Bruce Land and Matt Milam. He was also the first African American Republican in the legislature since 2002.

Republicans attacked the Democratic-supporting General Majority PAC for darkening McClellan's face in a mailer, accusing them of racism and demanding the mailer be withdrawn. McClellan commented on the mailer, "The Democratic Party claims to be the party of inclusion. However, the moment a person of color like me disagrees with their narrative, they launch an ad hominem attack, whip out their best 'Aunt Jemima' photograph, and purposefully darken my complexion in order to suppress dissent."

=== Tenure ===
McClellan was sworn into the Assembly on January 14, 2020, when the 219th New Jersey Legislature convened.

=== Committee assignments ===
- Appropriations
- Homeland Security and State Preparedness
- Tourism Gaming and the Arts

=== District 1 ===
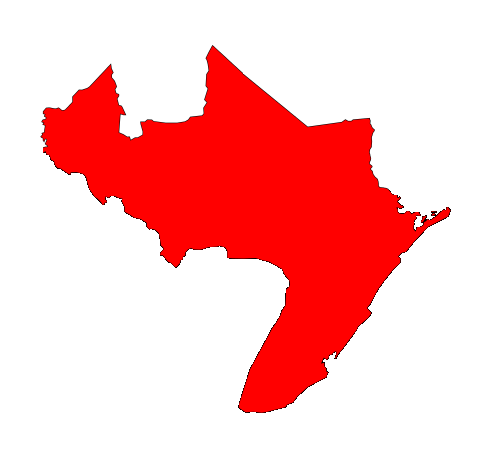
New Jersey Legislative District 1

New Jersey's 1st Legislative District encompasses parts of Atlantic County, New Jersey, Cumberland County, New Jersey, and all of Cape May County, New Jersey. Each of the 40 districts in the New Jersey Legislature has one representative in the New Jersey Senate and two members in the New Jersey General Assembly. The representatives from the 1st District for the 2026–2027 Legislative Session are:

- Senator Mike Testa (R)
- Assemblyman Antwan McClellan (R)
- Assemblyman Erik Simonsen (R)

== Electoral history ==
=== General Assembly ===
1st Legislative District General Election, 2025
Party	Candidate	Votes	%
Republican	Erik Simonsen (incumbent)	41,848	27.6
Republican	Antwan McClellan (incumbent)	41,572	27.4
Democratic	Carolyn Rush	34,237	22.6
Democratic	Carol Sabo	33,878	22.4
Total votes		151,535	100.0
Republican hold			

1st Legislative District General Election, 2023
Party	Candidate	Votes	%
Republican	Erik Simonsen (incumbent)	27,976	31.8
Republican	Antwan McClellan (incumbent)	27,603	31.3
Democratic	Damita White-Morris	16,257	18.5
Democratic	Eddie L. Bonner	16,228	18.4
Total votes		88,064	100.0
Republican hold			

1st legislative district general election, 2021
Party	Candidate	Votes	%
Republican	Erik Simonsen (incumbent)	40,803	31.61%
Republican	Antwan McClellan (incumbent)	40,405	31.30%
Democratic	John P. Capizola Jr.	23,818	18.45%
Democratic	Julia L. Hankerson	23,055	17.86%
Libertarian	Michael Gallo	589	0.46%
Libertarian	Jacob Selwood	399	0.31%
Total votes		129,069	100.00
Republican hold			

2019 New Jersey General Assembly election for the 1st Legislative District
Party	Candidate	Votes	%
Republican	Erik Simonsen	27,304	27.15%
Republican	Antwan McClellan	26,264	26.11%
Democratic	Bruce Land (Incumbent)	23,778	23.64%
Democratic	Matthew W. Milam (Incumbent)	23,234	23.10%
Total votes		100,508	100.0%
