= Robert E. Kay =

American politician

Member of the New Jersey Senate for the 1st district
- In office 1968–1971
- Preceded by: Frank S. Farley
- Succeeded by: James Cafiero

Member of the New Jersey General Assembly from Cape May County
- In office 1962–1965
- Preceded by: Anthony J. Volpe
- Succeeded by: Marvin D. Perskie
- In office 1954–1959
- Preceded by: Nathaniel C. Smith
- Succeeded by: Anthony J. Volpe

Personal details
- Born: August 3, 1916 Wildwood, New Jersey, U.S.
- Died: January 24, 1990 (aged 73) Cape May Court House, New Jersey, U.S.
- Political party: Republican
- Education: Duke University; South Jersey Law School

Military service
- Allegiance: United States
- Battles/wars: World War II

Robert E. Kay (August 3, 1916 – January 24, 1990) was an American Republican Party politician who served in the New Jersey State Senate and in the New Jersey General Assembly.

Born in Wildwood, New Jersey, on August 3, 1916, he graduated from Wildwood High School in 1933, Duke University in 1937 and earned a degree in law from the South Jersey Law School (since renamed as Rutgers Law School).

He served in the U.S. Air Force during World War II. Kay was elected to the State Assembly in 1953, representing Cape May County, New Jersey, and was re-elected in 1955 and 1957. He did not seek re-election in 1959, but was again elected in 1963. He was not a candidate for re-election in 1965. Kay was elected State Senator in 1967, narrowly defeating Democrat Robert Halpin by a 51%-49% margin. He did not run for a second term in 1971.

He died on January 24, 1990, at Burdette Tomlin Memorial Hospital (since renamed as Cooper University Hospital Cape Regional)
