= Matthew W. Milam =

Member of the New Jersey General Assembly

Matthew Milam
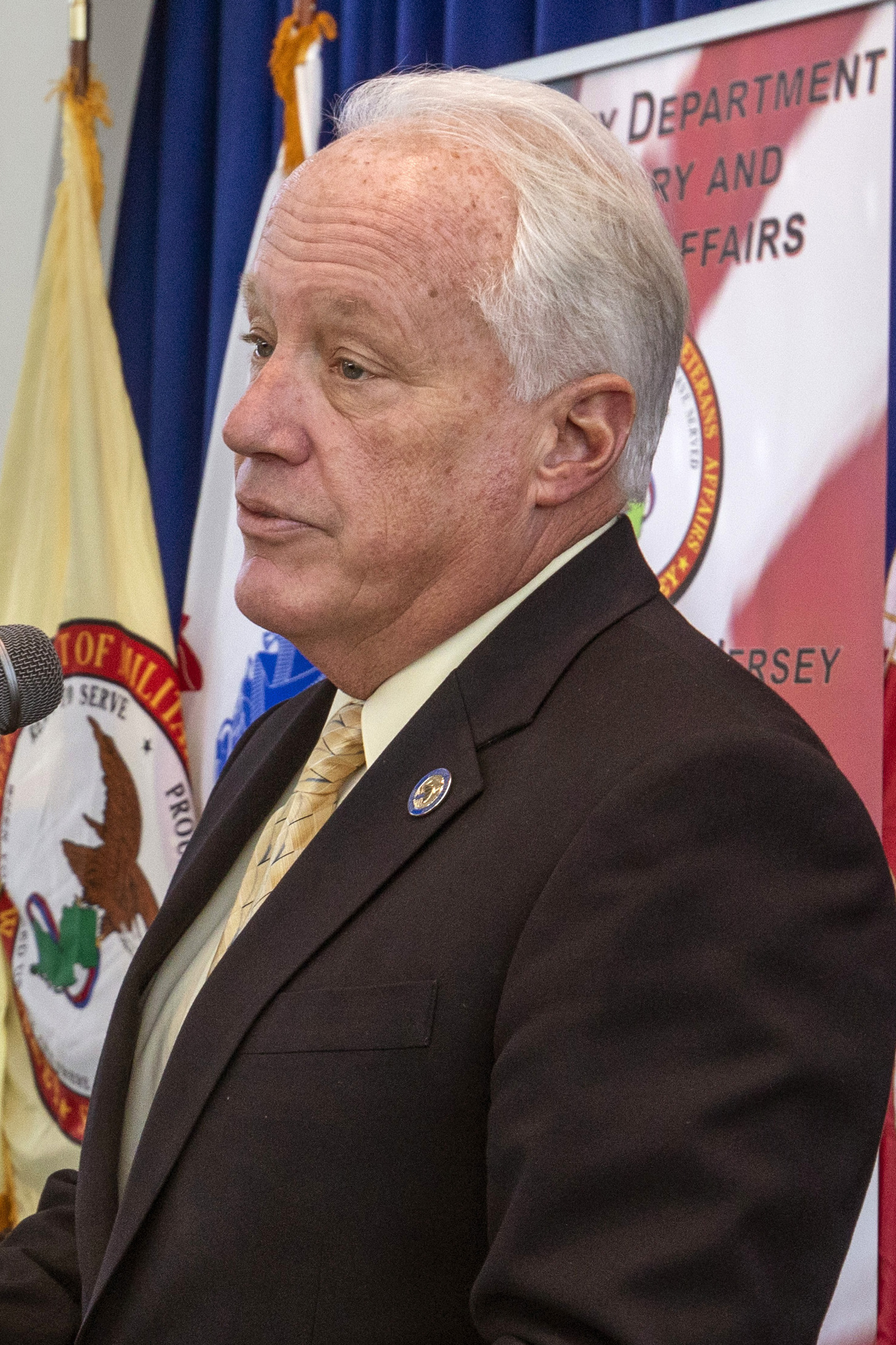

Member of the New Jersey General Assembly from the 1st District
- In office January 31, 2019 – January 14, 2020
- Preceded by: Bob Andrzejczak
- Succeeded by: Antwan McClellan; Erik Simonsen
- In office January 8, 2008 – March 1, 2013
- Preceded by: Jeff Van Drew
- Succeeded by: Bob Andrzejczak

Personal details
- Born: September 18, 1961 (age 64)
- Party: Democratic
- Spouse: Karen Milam

Matthew W. Milam (born September 18, 1961) is an American Democratic Party politician, who served in the New Jersey General Assembly from January 8, 2008 to March 1, 2013. He started serving again on January 31, 2019 until January 14, 2020.

== Early life ==
A resident of Vineland, New Jersey, Milam served in the Assembly on the Tourism and Gaming Committee (as Vice-Chair), the Environment and Solid Waste Committee and the Transportation, Public Works and Independent Authorities Committee. Milam is a graduate of Cumberland County College, where he majored in Political Science. He is President of Foundry Service Corporation. Milam has served as chair of the Cumberland County Economic Development Board since 2005.

== New Jersey Assembly ==
Milam was elected to the Assembly in 2007 after Jeff Van Drew retired to join the New Jersey Senate. He was sworn in on January 8, 2008. Milam resigned from the Assembly on March 1, 2013 and was replaced with Bob Andrzejczak. In Milam’s 2019 re-election campaign he and his running mate Bruce Land lost the election to republicans Erik Simonsen and Antwan McClellan.

=== Return to Assembly ===
After Jeff Van Drew resigned to join the United States House of Representatives in 2018 the 1st District's Assemblyman Bob Andrzejczak was appointed to fill Van Drew's seat in the Senate. Milam was chosen to fill Andrzejczak's seat on January 29, 2019. Milam was sworn into the Assembly by Speaker Craig Coughlin on January 31, 2019.

=== Tenure ===
After Milam was sworn in on January 31, 2019 he voted against raising the states minimum wage to $15 an hour alongside Bruce Land.

=== Committee assignments ===
- Agriculture and Natural Resources
- Military and Veterans' Affairs

== Electoral history ==
=== New Jersey Assembly ===
2019 New Jersey General Assembly election for the 1st Legislative District
Party	Candidate	Votes	%
Republican	Erik Simonsen	27,304	27.15%
Republican	Antwan McClellan	26,264	26.11%
Democratic	Bruce Land (Incumbent)	23,778	23.64%
Democratic	Matthew W. Milam (Incumbent)	23,234	23.10%
Total votes		100,508	100.0%

New Jersey general election, 2011
Party	Candidate	Votes	%
Democratic	Nelson Albano (Incumbent)	24,794	27.9
Democratic	Matthew Milam (Incumbent)	22,207	25.0
Republican	Sam Fiocchi	21,156	23.8
Republican	Suzanne M. Walters	20,810	23.4
Total votes		88,967	100.0

New Jersey general election, 2009
Party	Candidate	Votes	%	±%
Democratic	Nelson Albano (Incumbent)	32,375	27.7	▼1.1
Democratic	Matthew Milam (Incumbent)	29,810	25.6	▲0.3
Republican	Michael J. Donohue	27,705	23.7	▲0.5
Republican	John A. McCann	26,778	23.0	▲0.4
Total votes		'116,668'	'100.0'	

New Jersey general election, 2007
Party	Candidate	Votes	%	±%
Democratic	Nelson Albano (Incumbent)	27,721	28.8	▲0.7
Democratic	Matthew Milam	24,422	25.3	▼10.5
Republican	Michael J. Donohue	22,402	23.2	▲1.3
Republican	R. Norris Clark Jr.	21,820	22.6	▲8.5
Total votes		'96,365'	'100.0'	

New Jersey General Assembly
Preceded by Bob Andrzejczak	Member of the New Jersey General Assembly for the 1st District; 2019-2020; With: Bruce Land	Succeeded by Antwan McClellan; Erik Simonsen
Preceded by Jeff Van Drew	Member of the New Jersey General Assembly for the 1st District; 2008-2013; With: Nelson Albano	Succeeded by Bob Andrzejczak
