= Mike Testa =

Member of the New Jersey Senate (born 1976)

Member of the New Jersey Senate from the 1st district
- Incumbent
- Assumed office December 5, 2019
- Preceded by: Bob Andrzejczak

Personal details
- Born: May 1, 1976 (age 50) Vineland, New Jersey, U.S.
- Party: Republican
- Spouse: Julie Barber
- Children: 3
- Education: Villanova University (BA, JD); Temple University (LLM)
- Website: State Senate website

Michael L. Testa Jr. (born May 1, 1976) is an American politician and lawyer who represents the 1st Legislative District in the New Jersey Senate. A Republican, Testa was elected to the state senate on November 5, 2019 in the special election to fill the remainder of the unfinished term of Jeff Van Drew, who won a seat to the United States House of Representatives in 2018. He was sworn into office on December 5, 2019.

== Background ==
Testa was born in Vineland, New Jersey, on May 1, 1976. He is the great-grandson of Italian immigrants on his father's side, and his mother is a Polish Jew who was born to parents who had met each other in a concentration camp. Testa received a Bachelor of Arts degree and a Juris Doctor degree from Villanova University, and a Master of Laws degree from Temple University.

Testa is a partner at the law firm of Testa Heck Testa and White, P.A. He was elected as chair of the Cumberland County Republican Party on July 19, 2014, after serving as vice chairman for three years under Bob Greco. From 2006 to 2008, Testa was a member of the Vineland Downtown Improvement District/Main Street Vineland. He has also been a chairman of the Big Brothers Big Sisters of Cumberland and Salem Counties, and board president of Vineland Regional Dance.

In October 2019, the Donald Trump 2020 presidential campaign named Testa, along with State Senate Minority Whip Joseph Pennacchio, as New Jersey co-chairs for the president's re-election bid.

== New Jersey Senate ==
On November 5, 2018, 1st District State Senator Jeff Van Drew won a seat to the United States House of Representatives, creating a vacancy for his state senate seat. On November 20, Testa announced he would run for the special election for the remainder of Van Drew's State Senate term. President Donald Trump recorded robocalls for Testa in his state senate election, which were sent out on the day before election day.

Testa ran as a team with Antwan McClellan and Erik K. Simonsen for Assembly. During the campaign, the team made immigration and taxes a key part of their campaign. He, alongside Testa and McClellan, ousted the 1st District's legislators, Senator Bob Andrzejczak (who had been appointed to fill Van Drew's seat) and Assemblymen R. Bruce Land and Matthew W. Milam. Their victories were the only gains Republicans made in the 2019 New Jersey elections.

=== Tenure ===
Testa was sworn into the Senate on December 5, 2019, by Senate President Steve Sweeney. After Rep. Jeff Van Drew switched to the Republican Party, Testa endorsed Van Drew.

Committee assignments for the 2024-2025 session are:

- Budget and Appropriations
- Judiciary

In November 2023, records regarding the sale of a Vineland, New Jersey property, 1615 W. Garden Road, were subpoenaed by federal investigators. The Vineland Industrial Commission sold the plot to four limited liability companies that flipped the vacant lot, one of them being Nova Investments, of which Testa is a beneficiary.

=== District 1 ===
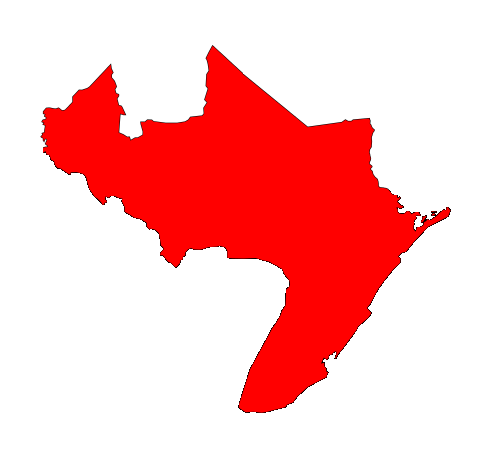
New Jersey Legislative District 1

New Jersey's 1st Legislative District encompasses parts of Atlantic County, Cumberland County, and all of Cape May County. Each of the 40 districts in the New Jersey Legislature has one representative in the New Jersey Senate and two members in the New Jersey General Assembly. The representatives from the 1st District for the 2024—2025 Legislative Session are:

- Senator Mike Testa (R)
- Assemblyman Antwan McClellan (R)
- Assemblyman Erik K. Simonsen (R)

== Personal life ==
Testa and his wife Julie, a former Miss New Jersey, live in Vineland. They have three children.

== Electoral history ==
1st Legislative District General Election, 2023
Party	Candidate	Votes	%
Republican	Michael L. Testa Jr. (incumbent)	29,186	64.6
Democratic	Charles R. LaSpata	15,972	35.4
Total votes		45,158	100.0%
Republican hold			

1st Legislative District general election, 2021
Party	Candidate	Votes	%
Republican	Michael Testa (incumbent)	42,438	64.59
Democratic	Yolanda E. Garcia Balicki	23,269	35.41
Total votes		65,707	100.0
Republican hold			

2019 New Jersey State Senate District 1 Special Election
Party	Candidate	Votes	%	±%
Republican	Mike Testa	27,163	53.5	▲19.5
Democratic	Bob Andrzejczak (incumbent)	23,636	46.5	
Total votes		50,799	100.0	
