= Guy F. Muziani =

American politician

Member of the New Jersey General Assembly from the 1st district
- In office January 12, 1982 – January 12, 1988
- Preceded by: James R. Hurley
- Succeeded by: Frank LoBiondo; Edward H. Salmon

Personal details
- Born: August 10, 1925 Philadelphia, Pennsylvania, U.S.
- Died: July 30, 1988 (aged 62)
- Party: Republican
- Education: South Philadelphia High School; Peirce School of Business Administration

Military service
- Allegiance: United States of America
- Battles/wars: World War Two; Battle of the Bulge (WIA)
- Awards: Purple Heart

Guy F. Muziani (August 10, 1925 – July 30, 1988) was an American politician who served in the New Jersey General Assembly from the 1st Legislative District from 1982 to 1988.

Born in Philadelphia, he attended South Philadelphia High School and the Peirce School of Business Administration. During World War II, he fought in the Battle of the Bulge and received a Purple Heart.

Muziani was a businessman in Wildwood, New Jersey, who unsuccessfully ran for the city commission in 1964 and 1968. He then was elected to the commission and served for 11 years as mayor of Wildwood under a system in which the commissioners chose a mayor from among their members. After a change to the city's form of government to have the mayor be directly elected, Muziani lost the mayoral race to his longtime foe, Earl B. Ostrander, who would be recalled from office after 17 months in office.

First elected to the General Assembly in 1981 alongside Joseph W. Chinnici, he fought for the area's tourism industry and championed the extension of Route 55 to Cape May County. He intended to run for reelection in 1987 but was too ill to campaign and retired from the Legislature. He died on July 30, 1988, of cancer.
