= Joseph W. Chinnici =

American politician (1919–2007)

Member of the New Jersey General Assembly from the 1st Legislative District
- In office January 11, 1972 – January 12, 1988 Serving with James R. Hurley (1974-1982) and Guy F. Muziani (1982-1988)
- Preceded by: James Cafiero
- Succeeded by: Frank LoBiondo and Edward H. Salmon

Personal details
- Born: July 27, 1919 Rosenhayn, New Jersey, U.S.
- Died: March 18, 2007 (aged 87) Atlantic City, New Jersey, U.S.
- Party: Republican

Joseph W. Chinnici (July 27, 1919 – March 18, 2007) was an American politician who served in the New Jersey General Assembly from the 1st Legislative District from 1972 to 1988.

A resident of Bridgeton, New Jersey while serving in the assembly, Chinnici was born in the Rosenhayn section of Deerfield Township and graduated in 1938 from Bridgeton High School. He attended the Wharton School of the University of Pennsylvania.

Chinnici served on the Bridgeton city council and was a member of the Cumberland County Board of Chosen Freeholders before his election to the assembly. He died on March 18, 2007, at age 87.
