= New Jersey's 1st legislative district =

American legislative district

- Senator: Mike Testa (R)
- Assembly members: Antwan McClellan (R); Erik K. Simonsen (R)
- Registration: 34.51% Republican; 28.94% Democratic; 35.12% unaffiliated
- Demographics: 68.9% White; 10.9% Black/African American; 0.7% Native American; 1.3% Asian; 0.0% Hawaiian/Pacific Islander; 8.7% Other race; 9.5% Two or more races; 19.7% Hispanic
- Population: 216,124
- Voting-age population: 173,507
- Registered voters: 164,343

New Jersey's 1st legislative district is one of 40 in the state, covering the Atlantic County municipalities of Corbin City, Estell Manor and Weymouth Township; all of Cape May County; and the Cumberland County municipalities of Bridgeton, Commercial Township, Downe Township, Fairfield Township, Lawrence Township, Maurice River Township, Millville and Vineland as of the 2021 apportionment.

== Demographic characteristics ==
As of the 2020 United States census, the district had a population of 216,124, of whom 173,507 (80.3%) were of voting age. The racial makeup of the district was 148,837 (68.9%) White, 23,585 (10.9%) African American, 1,536 (0.7%) Native American, 2,710 (1.3%) Asian, 42 (0.0%) Pacific Islander, 18,897 (8.7%) from some other race, and 20,517 (9.5%) from two or more races. Hispanic or Latino people of any race were 42,561 (19.7%) of the population.

The district had 162,425 registered voters as of December 1, 2023, of whom 58,060 (35.7%) were registered as unaffiliated, 53,502 (32.9%) were registered as Republicans, 48,219 (29.7%) were registered as Democrats, and 2,644 (1.6%) were registered to other parties.

== Political representation ==
For the 2026–2027 session, the 1st legislative district of the New Jersey Legislature is represented in the State Senate by Mike Testa (R, Vineland) and in the General Assembly by Antwan McClellan (R, Ocean City) and Erik K. Simonsen (R, Lower Township).

It is entirely located within New Jersey's 2nd congressional district.

== 1965–1973 ==
During the period of time after the 1964 Supreme Court decision in Reynolds v. Sims and before the establishment of a 40-district legislature in 1973, the 1st district encompassed the entirety of Atlantic, Cape May, and Gloucester counties in the 1965–1967 Senate session (two Senators elected), and Cape May and Cumberland counties in the Senate and Assembly sessions from 1967 through 1973 (one Senator and two Assembly members elected).

In the 1965-1967 Senate session, Republicans John E. Hunt and Frank S. Farley were elected though one seat of the two would become vacant upon Hunt's election to the House of Representatives. In the following two Senate sessions, Republican Robert E. Kay was elected in 1967 for a four-year term followed by Republican James Cafiero for a two-year term in 1971.

For the two-year assembly sessions from 1967 until 1973, Republicans held both seats for the three assembly elections during this period, with Cafiero and James R. Hurley winning in the 1967 and 1969 elections, and Hurley and Joseph W. Chinnici winning in 1971.

== District composition since 1973 ==
For the first iteration of the 1st district implemented under the 40 equal districts plan, the district once again encompassed all of Cape May and Cumberland counties. For the sessions following the 1980 census, the 1st included all of Cape May, but only included the Cumberland County cities of Bridgeton, Millville, and Vineland, and the townships of Deerfield, Maurice River, and Upper Deerfield. The 1991 iteration of the 1st included all of Cape May, only Maurice River Township, Millville, and Vineland in Cumberland, and added Buena and Buena Vista Township in Atlantic County. With the exception of adding Atlantic County's Somers Point, the 2001 iteration of the 1st remained the same as the 1991 district. The 2021 apportionment added Bridgeton, and removed Greenwich Township, Hopewell Township, Shiloh and Stow Creek Township.

== Election history ==
Session	Senate	General Assembly	
1974–1975	James Cafiero (R)	James R. Hurley (R)	Joseph W. Chinnici (R)
1976–1977	James Cafiero (R)	James R. Hurley (R)	Joseph W. Chinnici (R)
1978–1979	James Cafiero (R)	James R. Hurley (R)	Joseph W. Chinnici (R)
1980–1981	James Cafiero (R)	James R. Hurley (R)	Joseph W. Chinnici (R)
1982–1983	James R. Hurley (R)	Guy F. Muziani (R)	Joseph W. Chinnici (R)
1984–1985	James R. Hurley (R)	Guy F. Muziani (R)	Joseph W. Chinnici (R)
1986–1987	James R. Hurley (R)	Guy F. Muziani (R)	Joseph W. Chinnici (R)
1988–1989	James R. Hurley (R) (Note: Resigned January 2, 1990 to accept appointment to the Casino Control Commission)	Frank LoBiondo (R)	Edward H. Salmon (D)
1990–1991	James Cafiero (R) (Note: Appointed in January 1990, won special election in November 1990 to complete term)	Frank LoBiondo (R)	Edward H. Salmon (D) (Note: Resigned to become President of the Board of Public Utilities)
1990–1991	James Cafiero (R)	Frank LoBiondo (R)	Raymond A. Batten (D) (Note: Appointed April 1991)
1992–1993	James Cafiero (R)	Frank LoBiondo (R)	John C. Gibson (R)
1994–1995	James Cafiero (R)	Frank LoBiondo (R) (Note: Resigned upon election to U.S. House of Representatives)	John C. Gibson (R)
1994–1995	James Cafiero (R)	Nicholas Asselta (R) (Note: Appointed January 23, 1995)	John C. Gibson (R)
1996–1997	James Cafiero (R)	Nicholas Asselta (R)	John C. Gibson (R)
1998–1999	James Cafiero (R)	Nicholas Asselta (R)	John C. Gibson (R)
2000–2001	James Cafiero (R)	Nicholas Asselta (R)	John C. Gibson (R)
2002–2003	James Cafiero (R)	Nicholas Asselta (R)	Jeff Van Drew (D)
2004–2005	Nicholas Asselta (R)	John C. Gibson (R)	Jeff Van Drew (D)
2006–2007	Nicholas Asselta (R)	Nelson Albano (D)	Jeff Van Drew (D)
2008–2009	Jeff Van Drew (D)	Nelson Albano (D)	Matthew W. Milam (D)
2010–2011	Jeff Van Drew (D)	Nelson Albano (D)	Matthew W. Milam (D)
2012–2013	Jeff Van Drew (D)	Nelson Albano (D)	Matthew W. Milam (D) (Note: Resigned March 1, 2013)
2012–2013	Jeff Van Drew (D)	Nelson Albano (D)	Bob Andrzejczak (D) (Note: Appointed March 21, 2013)
2014–2015	Jeff Van Drew (D)	Sam Fiocchi (R)	Bob Andrzejczak (D)
2016–2017	Jeff Van Drew (D)	R. Bruce Land (D)	Bob Andrzejczak (D)
2018–2019	Jeff Van Drew (D) (Note: Resigned January 2, 2019 following election to the United States House of Representatives)	R. Bruce Land (D)	Bob Andrzejczak (D) (Note: Resigned from the Assembly on January 14, 2019, appointed to the Senate on January 15, 2019, defeated in November 2019 special election)
2018–2019	Bob Andrzejczak (D)	R. Bruce Land (D)	Matthew W. Milam (D) (Note: Appointed January 31, 2019)
2018–2019	Mike Testa (R) (Note: Elected in November 2019 special election, seated December 5, 2019)	R. Bruce Land (D)	Matthew W. Milam (D)
2020–2021	Mike Testa (R)	Antwan McClellan (R)	Erik K. Simonsen (R)
2022–2023	Mike Testa (R)	Antwan McClellan (R)	Erik K. Simonsen (R)
2024–2025	Mike Testa (R)	Antwan McClellan (R)	Erik K. Simonsen (R)
2026–2027	Mike Testa (R)	Antwan McClellan (R)	Erik K. Simonsen (R)

== Election results, 1973–present ==
=== Senate ===
2021 New Jersey general election
Party	Candidate	Votes	%	±%
Republican	Mike Testa	42,438	64.6	▲11.2
Democratic	Yolanda E. Garcia Balicki	23,269	35.4	▼11.2
Total votes		65,707	100.0	

Special election, November 5, 2019
Party	Candidate	Votes	%	±%
Republican	Mike Testa	27,928	53.4	▲19.4
Democratic	Bob Andrzejczak	24,343	46.6	▼18.2
Total votes		52,271	100.0	

New Jersey general election, 2017
Party	Candidate	Votes	%	±%
Democratic	Jeff Van Drew	35,464	64.8	▲5.4
Republican	Mary Gruccio	18,589	34.0	▼5.2
Cannot Be Bought	Anthony Parisi Sanchez	652	1.2	N/A
Total votes		54,705	100.0	

New Jersey general election, 2013
Party	Candidate	Votes	%	±%
Democratic	Jeff Van Drew	34,624	59.4	▲5.3
Republican	Susan Adelizzi Schmidt	22,835	39.2	▼6.7
Independence For All	Tom Greto	825	1.4	N/A
Total votes		58,284	100.0	

2011 New Jersey general election
Party	Candidate	Votes	%	±%
Democratic	Jeff Van Drew	24,557	54.1	▼1.6
Republican	David S. DeWeese	20,857	45.9	▲1.6
Total votes		45,414	100.0	

2007 New Jersey general election
Party	Candidate	Votes	%	±%
Democratic	Jeff Van Drew	28,240	55.7	N/A
Republican	Nicholas Asselta	22,469	44.3	▼36.6
Total votes		50,709	100.0	

2003 New Jersey general election
Party	Candidate	Votes	%	±%
Republican	Nicholas Asselta	31,112	80.9	▲30.5
HealthCare For All	Steven Fenichel	5,986	15.6	N/A
English Language Only	George Cecola	1,341	3.5	N/A
Total votes		38,439	100.0	

2001 New Jersey general election
Party	Candidate	Votes	%
Republican	James S. Cafiero	31,150	50.4
Democratic	William J. Hughes, Jr.	30,709	49.6
Total votes		61,859	100.0

1997 New Jersey general election
Party	Candidate	Votes	%	±%
Republican	James S. Cafiero	35,573	60.8	▼1.2
Democratic	John Rauh	21,340	36.5	0.0
Conservative	Geraldine Caiafa	1,579	2.7	N/A
Total votes		58,492	100.0	

1993 New Jersey general election
Party	Candidate	Votes	%	±%
Republican	James S. Cafiero	36,420	62.0	0.0
Democratic	John Spahn	21,446	36.5	▼1.5
Libertarian	Joseph T. Ponczek	957	1.6	N/A
Total votes		58,823	100.0	

1991 New Jersey general election
Party	Candidate	Votes	%
Republican	James S. Cafiero	31,624	62.0
Democratic	Ronald J. Casella	19,404	38.0
Total votes		51,028	100.0

Special election, 1990
Party	Candidate	Votes	%	±%
Republican	James S. Cafiero	33,812	57.6	▲4.2
Democratic	Edward H. Salmon	24,925	42.4	▼4.2
Total votes		58,737	100.0	

1987 New Jersey general election
Party	Candidate	Votes	%	±%
Republican	James R. Hurley	29,272	53.4	▼6.4
Democratic	Donald H. Rainear	25,512	46.6	▲6.4
Total votes		54,784	100.0	

1983 New Jersey general election
Party	Candidate	Votes	%	±%
Republican	James R. Hurley	30,141	59.8	▲6.0
Democratic	Christopher H. Riley	20,232	40.2	▼6.0
Total votes		50,373	100.0	

1981 New Jersey general election
Party	Candidate	Votes	%
Republican	James R. Hurley	32,443	53.8
Democratic	Edward H. Salmon	27,862	46.2
Total votes		60,305	100.0

1977 New Jersey general election
Party	Candidate	Votes	%	±%
Republican	James S. Cafiero	35,416	62.0	▲3.7
Democratic	Frank Kneiser	21,702	38.0	▼3.7
Total votes		57,118	100.0	

1973 New Jersey general election
Party	Candidate	Votes	%
Republican	James S. Cafiero	34,807	58.3
Democratic	William E. Bowen	24,933	41.7
Total votes		59,740	100.0

=== General Assembly ===
2023 New Jersey general election
Party	Candidate	Votes	%	±%
Republican	Erik Simonsen	27,976	31.8	▲0.2
Republican	Antwan McClellan	27,603	31.3	0.0
Democratic	Damita White-Morris	16,257	18.4	▼0.1
Democratic	Eddie L. Bonner	16,228	18.4	▲0.5
Total votes		88,064	100.0	

2021 New Jersey general election
Party	Candidate	Votes	%	±%
Republican	Erik Simonsen	40,803	31.6	▲4.5
Republican	Antwan McClellan	40,405	31.3	▲5.2
Democratic	John P. Capizola Jr.	23,818	18.5	▼5.1
Democratic	Julia L. Hankerson	23,055	17.9	▼5.2
Libertarian	Michael Gallo	589	0.5	N/A
Libertarian	Jacob Selwood	399	0.3	N/A
Total votes		129,069	100.0	

2019 New Jersey general election
Party	Candidate	Votes	%	±%
Republican	Erik Simonsen	27,304	27.1	▲7.5
Republican	Antwan McClellan	26,264	26.1	▲6.7
Democratic	R. Bruce Land	23,778	23.6	▼6.1
Democratic	Matthew W. Milam	23,234	23.1	▼8.1
Total votes		100,580	100.0	

New Jersey general election, 2017
Party	Candidate	Votes	%	±%
Democratic	Bob Andrzejczak	32,554	31.2	▲3.3
Democratic	R. Bruce Land	30,938	29.7	▲3.3
Republican	James R. Sauro	20,445	19.6	▼3.0
Republican	Robert G. Campbell	20,250	19.4	▼3.8
Total votes		104,187	100.0	

New Jersey general election, 2015
Party	Candidate	Votes	%	±%
Democratic	Bob Andrzejczak	20,231	27.9	▲0.7
Democratic	R. Bruce Land	19,140	26.4	▲2.2
Republican	Sam Fiocchi	16,818	23.2	▼1.8
Republican	Jim Sauro	16,395	22.6	▼0.9
Total votes		72,584	100.0	

New Jersey general election, 2013
Party	Candidate	Votes	%	±%
Democratic	Bob Andrzejczak	29,958	27.2	▲2.2
Republican	Sam Fiocchi	27,539	25.0	▲1.2
Democratic	Nelson Albano	26,611	24.2	▼3.7
Republican	Kristine Gabor	25,903	23.5	▲0.1
Total votes		110,011	100.0	

New Jersey general election, 2011
Party	Candidate	Votes	%	±%
Democratic	Nelson Albano	24,794	27.9	▲0.2
Democratic	Matthew Milam	22,207	25.0	▼0.6
Republican	Samuel Fiocchi	21,156	23.8	▲0.1
Republican	Suzanne M. Walters	20,810	23.4	▲0.4
Total votes		88,967	100.0	

New Jersey general election, 2009
Party	Candidate	Votes	%	±%
Democratic	Nelson Albano	32,375	27.7	▼1.1
Democratic	Matthew Milam	29,810	25.6	▲0.3
Republican	Michael J. Donohue	27,705	23.7	▲0.5
Republican	John A. McCann	26,778	23.0	▲0.4
Total votes		116,668	100.0	

New Jersey general election, 2007
Party	Candidate	Votes	%	±%
Democratic	Nelson Albano	27,721	28.8	▲0.7
Democratic	Matthew Milam	24,422	25.3	▼10.5
Republican	Michael J. Donohue	22,402	23.2	▲1.3
Republican	R. Norris Clark Jr.	21,820	22.6	▲8.5
Total votes		96,365	100.0	

New Jersey general election, 2005
Party	Candidate	Votes	%	±%
Democratic	Jeff Van Drew	41,381	35.8	▲9.3
Democratic	Nelson Albano	32,500	28.1	▲7.4
Republican	John C. Gibson	25,324	21.9	▼3.7
Republican	George Cecola	16,338	14.1	▼10.2
Total votes		115,593	100.0	

New Jersey general election, 2003
Party	Candidate	Votes	%	±%
Democratic	Jeff Van Drew	25,080	26.5	▲0.2
Republican	John C. Gibson	24,187	25.6	▲0.3
Republican	Andrew J. McCrosson, Jr.	22,927	24.3	▼5.3
Democratic	Maria LaBoy	19,524	20.7	▲1.9
Green	Mary A. Snyder	1,193	1.3	N/A
Green	Carly R. Massey	835	0.9	N/A
Socialist	Costantino Rozzo	768	0.8	N/A
Total votes		94,514	100.0	

New Jersey general election, 2001
Party	Candidate	Votes	%
Republican	Nicholas Asselta	36,392	29.6
Democratic	Jeff Van Drew	32,271	26.3
Republican	John C. Gibson	31,067	25.3
Democratic	Douglas Jones-Romero	23,147	18.8
Total votes		122,877	100.0

New Jersey general election, 1999
Party	Candidate	Votes	%	±%
Republican	Nicholas Asselta	28,096	35.2	▲8.2
Republican	John C. Gibson	26,763	33.5	▲7.9
Democratic	Mary D'Arcy Bittner	12,146	15.2	▼10.3
Democratic	Maria A. Laboy	11,834	14.8	▼3.1
Conservative	Geraldine Caiafa	976	1.2	▲0.1
Total votes		79,815	100.0	

New Jersey general election, 1997
Party	Candidate	Votes	%	±%
Republican	John C. Gibson	32,699	27.6	▼1.6
Republican	Nicholas Asselta	32,032	27.0	▲1.3
Democratic	Jeff Van Drew	30,221	25.5	▲2.3
Democratic	Rob O'Donnell	21,278	17.9	▼3.9
Conservative	Rosemary Garrison	1,325	1.1	N/A
Conservative	Marie Pellecchia	1,127	0.9	N/A
Total votes		118,682	100.0	

New Jersey general election, 1995
Party	Candidate	Votes	%	±%
Republican	John C. Gibson	24,512	29.2	▲1.3
Republican	Nicholas Asselta	21,588	25.7	▼5.5
Democratic	Louis N. Magazzu	19,441	23.2	▲2.9
Democratic	John R. Rauh	18,302	21.8	▲1.9
Total votes		83,843	100.0	

New Jersey general election, 1993
Party	Candidate	Votes	%	±%
Republican	Frank A. LoBiondo	36,941	31.2	▼0.5
Republican	John C. Gibson	32,959	27.9	▼0.2
Democratic	Ronald J. Casella	23,983	20.3	▼0.3
Democratic	Bruce M. Gorman	23,493	19.9	▲0.3
Libertarian	Scott L. Derby	959	0.8	N/A
Total votes		118,335	100.0	

1991 New Jersey general election
Party	Candidate	Votes	%
Republican	Frank A. LoBiondo	32,063	31.7
Republican	John C. Gibson	28,402	28.1
Democratic	Jennifer R. Lookabaugh	20,872	20.6
Democratic	Raymond A. Batten	19,803	19.6
Total votes		101,140	100.0

1989 New Jersey general election
Party	Candidate	Votes	%	±%
Democratic	Edward H. Salmon	35,715	28.4	▲2.5
Republican	Frank A. LoBiondo	32,600	25.9	▼1.0
Democratic	Raymond A. Batten	31,193	24.8	▲1.2
Republican	Martin L. Pagliughi	26,440	21.0	▼2.6
Total votes		125,948	100.0	

1987 New Jersey general election
Party	Candidate	Votes	%	±%
Republican	Frank A. LoBiondo	28,638	26.9	▼6.8
Democratic	Edward H. Salmon	27,561	25.9	▲9.4
Republican	Gerald M. Thornton	25,182	23.6	▼8.5
Democratic	Raymond A. Batten	25,166	23.6	▲5.8
Total votes		106,547	100.0	

1985 New Jersey general election
Party	Candidate	Votes	%	±%
Republican	Joseph W. Chinnici	35,610	33.7	▲5.5
Republican	Guy F. Muziani	33,978	32.1	▲6.0
Democratic	Raymond A. Batten	18,794	17.8	▼8.0
Democratic	Peter L. Amico	17,407	16.5	▼3.4
Total votes		105,789	100.0	

New Jersey general election, 1983
Party	Candidate	Votes	%	±%
Republican	Joseph W. Chinnici	28,111	28.2	▼1.1
Republican	Guy F. Muziani	25,998	26.1	▲0.7
Democratic	Edward H. Salmon	25,790	25.8	▲2.2
Democratic	Jeanne L. Gorman	19,890	19.9	▼1.8
Total votes		99,789	100.0	

New Jersey general election, 1981
Party	Candidate	Votes	%
Republican	Joseph W. Chinnici	33,584	29.3
Republican	Guy F. Muziani	29,030	25.4
Democratic	Henry Ricci	27,018	23.6
Democratic	William H. Woods	24,873	21.7
Total votes		114,505	100.0

New Jersey general election, 1979
Party	Candidate	Votes	%	±%
Republican	James R. Hurley	31,196	31.8	▲0.5
Republican	Joseph W. Chinnici	28,209	28.8	0.0
Democratic	Randy Wilhelm	20,034	20.5	▲0.8
Democratic	Jerry G. Livingston	18,520	18.9	▼0.4
Total votes		97,959	100.0	

New Jersey general election, 1977
Party	Candidate	Votes	%	±%
Republican	James R. Hurley	35,993	31.3	▲1.0
Republican	Joseph W. Chinnici	33,104	28.8	▼0.6
Democratic	James J. Seeley	22,606	19.7	▼0.9
Democratic	Jeffrey A. April	22,146	19.3	▼0.4
Independent	John Phillips	1,175	1.0	N/A
Total votes		115,024	100.0	

New Jersey general election, 1975
Party	Candidate	Votes	%	±%
Republican	James R. Hurley	33,213	30.3	▼0.8
Republican	Joseph W. Chinnici	32,230	29.4	▲0.2
Democratic	Henry R. Ricci	22,570	20.6	▲0.3
Democratic	Gary E. Greenblatt	21,653	19.7	▲0.3
Total votes		109,666	100.0	

New Jersey general election, 1973
Party	Candidate	Votes	%
Republican	James R. Hurley	36,327	31.1
Republican	Joseph W. Chinnici	34,104	29.2
Democratic	Charles A. Thomas	23,653	20.3
Democratic	Robert J. Sheston	22,668	19.4
Total votes		116,752	100.0

== Election results, 1965–1973 ==
=== Senate ===
1965 New Jersey general election
Party	Candidate	Votes	%
Republican	John E. Hunt	75,373	27.9
Republican	Frank S. Farley	69,767	25.8
Democratic	Leo T. Clark	65,059	24.1
Democratic	Edward Savage	59,959	22.2
Socialist Labor	George Frenoy, Jr.	271	0.1
Total votes		270,429	100.0

1967 New Jersey general election
Party	Candidate	Votes	%
Republican	Robert E. Kay	27,841	51.2
Democratic	Robert J. Halpin	26,149	48.1
Conservative	Linwood Erickson, Jr.	364	0.7
Total votes		54,354	100.0

1971 New Jersey general election
Party	Candidate	Votes	%
Republican	James S. Cafiero	28,014	50.0
Democratic	Paul R. Porreca	27,098	48.4
People's	John W. Gotsch	867	1.5
Total votes		55,979	100.0

=== General Assembly ===
New Jersey general election, 1967
Party	Candidate	Votes	%
Republican	James S. Cafiero	28,436	26.9
Republican	James R. Hurley	28,364	26.8
Democratic	Marvin D. Perskie	25,212	23.8
Democratic	Stephen Romanik	23,091	21.8
Conservative	Charles E. Corson	327	0.3
Conservative	John Thomas Baird	259	0.2
The Good Life	Brinton P. Minshall	118	0.1
Total votes		105,807	100.0

New Jersey general election, 1969
Party	Candidate	Votes	%
Republican	James S. Cafiero	36,155	32.6
Republican	James R. Hurley	35,756	32.2
Democratic	Robert C. Wolf	19,679	17.7
Democratic	Thomas J. Sorensen	19,404	17.5
Total votes		110,994	100.0

New Jersey general election, 1971
Party	Candidate	Votes	%
Republican	James R. Hurley	30,172	28.1
Republican	Joseph W. Chinnici	27,424	25.5
Democratic	Charles Fisher	23,898	22.2
Democratic	John W. Sjostrom	22,641	21.1
Independent	Carl F. Peek	3,290	3.1
Total votes		107,425	100.0
