= William J. Hughes =

American politician (1932–2019)

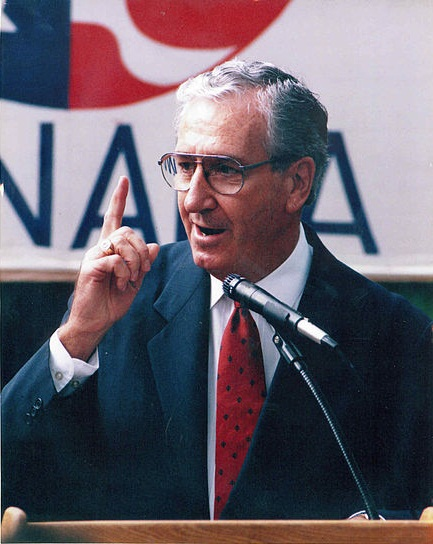
- Hughes c. 1996

United States Ambassador to Panama
- In office November 7, 1995 – October 13, 1998
- President: Bill Clinton
- Preceded by: Oliver P. Garza
- Succeeded by: Simon Ferro

Member of the U.S. House of Representatives from New Jersey's 2nd district
- In office January 3, 1975 – January 3, 1995
- Preceded by: Charles W. Sandman Jr.
- Succeeded by: Frank LoBiondo

Personal details
- Born: William John Hughes; October 17, 1932 Salem, New Jersey, U.S.
- Died: October 30, 2019 (aged 87) Ocean City, New Jersey, U.S.
- Party: Democratic
- Spouse: Nancy Gibson (m. 1956; died 2018)
- Children: 4
- Education: Rutgers University (BA, LLB)
- Occupation: Attorney

William John "Jack" Hughes (October 17, 1932 – October 30, 2019) was an American politician and diplomat who served as a Democratic member of the U.S. House of Representatives from 1975 to 1995, representing New Jersey's Second Congressional District which includes major portions of the Jersey Shore and Pine Barrens, the cities of Vineland and Atlantic City, and the counties of Salem, Cumberland, Atlantic, Cape May and part of Gloucester. After retiring from Congress in 1995, Hughes was appointed by President Bill Clinton as United States Ambassador to Panama, a post he held until October, 1998 leading up to the historic turnover of the Panama Canal to Panamanian control.

During his tenure in Congress, Hughes was a member of the House Judiciary Committee, where he chaired the Subcommittee on Crime (1981–1990) and the Subcommittee on Intellectual Property and Judicial Administration (1991–1994). Hughes also served on the House Committee on Merchant Marine and Fisheries, which had jurisdiction over numerous issues of importance to his coastal district. Hughes was one of the managers appointed by the House of Representatives in 1986 to conduct impeachment proceedings against District Court Judge Harry E. Claiborne of Nevada. Before being elected to Congress, Hughes served for 10 years as First Assistant Prosecutor in Cape May County from 1960 to 1970. His Congressional Papers are housed at the Rutgers University Libraries Special Collections and University Archives.

== Personal history ==
Hughes was born in Salem, New Jersey, the son of Pauline Mehaffey and William W. Hughes. He graduated from Penns Grove High School in 1950. He attended Rutgers University, graduating in 1955 and earned his law degree from Rutgers Law School in 1958. He was admitted to the New Jersey bar in 1959 and commenced practice in Ocean City; served as township solicitor for Upper Township, 1959–1961; appointed assistant prosecutor for Cape May County in 1960; reappointed as first assistant prosecutor in 1961 and served until the spring of 1970; appointed by the New Jersey Supreme Court to the Advisory Committee on Professional Ethics, 1972. Prior to his election to Congress in 1974, Hughes was President of the law firm of Loveland, Hughes and Garrett in Ocean City. Hughes was married to the former Nancy L. Gibson of Moorestown from 1956 until her death in 2018. The couple had four children.

Following his return from Panama, Hughes taught for several years at Stockton State College in Pomona, New Jersey. His work at Stockton led to the founding of a Public Policy Center which in 2008 was named the William J. Hughes Center for Public Policy. Hughes also received honorary degrees from Rutgers University, Glassboro State (now Rowan University), Stockton College, Mount Vernon College for Women, Cumberland County College and Atlantic Cape Community College. In 1997, he was inducted into the Rutgers Hall of Distinguished Alumni.

Hughes was a longtime resident of Ocean City, where he died on October 30, 2019, at age 87.

== United States House of Representatives ==
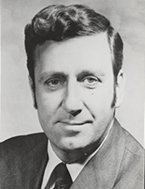
Hughes as U.S. Representative

Hughes served in the United States House of Representatives from 1975 until 1995.

=== Crime Subcommittee ===
During his tenure in Congress, Hughes served as a member of the House Judiciary Committee, where he chaired the Subcommittee on Crime (1981–1990). During that time, Hughes sponsored numerous anti-crime bills that became law including, four that became the government's principal weapons in the war against drugs and other illegal activity. They are:

1. The Comprehensive Drug Penalties Act (H.R. 4901) (Note: After passing the House on September 11, 1984, the legislation was placed on Senate Legislative Calendar on September 17, 1984 and subsequently the provisions of H.R. 4901 were rolled into H.J. Res. 648 making continuing appropriations for the fiscal year 1985, signed into law Oct. 12, 1984 (Public Law No. 98-473).) gave the courts significant new authority to order the seizure of boats, airplanes, cars, real estate, cash and other assets acquired by drug dealers through their criminal activities, thus enabling the government to seize billions of dollars in ill-gotten gain. According to Alice S. Fisher, Assistant Attorney General for the U.S. Department of Justice Criminal Division: "[Asset forfeiture] has become a vital weapon in the United States' anti-crime arsenal to strip criminals of their illicit wealth…. The Asset Forfeiture Program has forfeited more than $2 billion during the past two years—and is in the process of returning nearly $700 million to victims of crime in FY 2007 alone."
2. Money Laundering Penalties Act (H.R. 6031) (Note: Passed by the House on Sept. 10, 1984; received in the Senate Sept. 12, 1984; the provisions of H.R. 6031 were rolled into H.J.Res. 648, making continuing appropriations for the fiscal year 1985; signed October 12, 1984 (Public Law No: 98-473). In the next Congress, Hughes introduced additional money laundering legislation in 1986 as H.R.5217 which subsequently became Subtitle H (The Money Laundering Control Act of 1986) of H.R. 5484, the Anti-Drug Abuse Act of 1986, an omnibus anti-drug measure that was signed into law on October 27, 1986 and became Public Law 99-570.) prohibits the transport of drug-related funds out of the country and makes it more difficult for drug dealers to keep and use the proceeds of their crimes, and
3. The Chemical Diversion and Trafficking Act of 1988 (Note: First introduced by Hughes in the 100th Congress as H.R. 2585, Chemical Diversion and Trafficking Act of 1987, the legislation was subsequently incorporated into H.R. 4916, the Anti-Drug Abuse Amendments of 1988, which ultimately became Subtitle A of Title VI of H.R. 5210, the Anti-Drug Abuse Amendments Act of 1988, Public Law 100-690.) enabled the Federal Government to regulate listed chemicals used in the clandestine synthesis of dangerous drugs.
4. Anabolic Steroids Control Act of 1990 (Note: First introduced by Hughes in the 101st Congress as H.R. 5269, Anabolic Steroids Control Act of 1990, the legislation was subsequently incorporated as Title XIX of Crime Control Act of 1990 (Public Law 101–647).) placed anabolic steroids under Schedule III of the Controlled Substances Act, regulated human growth hormone, and established criminal penalties for their non-medical use and distribution of the substances.

In addition to the foregoing, under Hughes' chairmanship, the Crime Subcommittee also produced a number of other significant initiatives including the Major Fraud Act of 1988, the Child Sexual Abuse and Pornography Act, the Antiterrorism Act, the Computer Fraud and Abuse Act, the Federal Anti-Tampering Act which authorized the federal government to investigate incidents involving tampering with drugs or consumer products and imposed criminal penalties for such acts, the Justice Assistance Act (H.R. 2175), (Note: After passing the House on May 10, 1983, and the Senate on August 10, 1984, the provisions of H.R. 2175 were rolled into H.J.Res. 648, making continuing appropriations for the fiscal year 1985; signed Oct. 12, 1984 (Public Law No. 98-473).) which provided federal matching grants to state and local governments to carry out innovative and effective anti-crime programs, the Contract Services for Drug Dependent Federal Offenders Authorization Act of 1983 (H.R. 2173) which authorized funds to monitor and test federal drug offenders to keep them from going back to drugs, the Anti-Arson Act of 1982 (H.R. 6454) which expanded federal jurisdiction to include all major interstate arson cases, the Convention on the Physical Protection of Nuclear Material Implementation Act of 1982 (H.R. 5228) which imposed fines and prison terms for the illegal diversion or use of nuclear materials and authorized improved nuclear safeguards, the Pretrial Services Act (H.R. 3481), (Note: H.R. 3481 passed the House on May 11, 1982; Senate version S.923 enacted in lieu of H.R. 3481.) which implemented a nationwide system to provide judges with better information about defendants before setting bail, and for monitoring defendants awaiting trial, the Dangerous Drug Diversion Control Act of 1984 (H.R. 5656) (Note: Passed the House of Representatives Sept. 18, 1984; received in the Senate and read twice and referred to the Committee on Judiciary; provisions of H.R. 5656 were rolled into H.J. Res. 648, making continuing appropriations for the fiscal year 1985.) which strengthened federal authority to prevent the diversion of legal prescription drugs into the illicit market, the Computer Trespass Act of 1984 (H.R. 5616) (Note: H.R. 5616 was passed by the House of Representatives on July 24, 1984, and by the Senate on October 11, 1984. Subsequently, the provisions of this bill were incorporated into H.J. Res. 648, making continuing appropriations for the fiscal year 1985.) which provided criminal penalties for counterfeiting access devices and for the illegal entry into federal interest computers, and the Trademark Counterfeiting Act (H.R. 6071) (Note: Passed the House Sept. 12, 1988 (Record Vote No: 387), placed on Senate Legislative Calendar Sept. 17, 1984; the provisions of H.R. 6071 were subsequently incorporated into H.J.Res. 648, making continuing appropriations for the fiscal year 1985.) which strengthened federal laws against the counterfeiting of trademarked products.

=== Firearms related issues ===
Because the Subcommittee on Crime had jurisdiction over Federal firearms laws as well as the Bureau of Alcohol, Tobacco, Firearms and Explosives, Hughes was involved in a number of gun-related issues during his chairmanship. These include:

- Undetectable Firearms Act of 1988 (H.R. 4445) – Amended the Federal criminal code to make it unlawful to manufacture, import, sell, ship, deliver, possess, transfer, or receive any firearm which is not as detectable by walk-through metal detectors or which has major components that do not generate an accurate image when subjected to inspection by airport x-ray machines. No such firearms actually exist. Signed into law by President Reagan November 10, 1988 (Public Law No: 100-649)
- Law Enforcement Officers Protection Act of 1985 (H.R. 3132) – Hughes was an original cosponsor of this legislation which prohibited the manufacture, importation and sale of ammunition designed to penetrate the bullet-resistant armor worn by police officers. Signed into law by President Reagan August 28, 1986 (Became Public Law No: 99-408)
- Career Criminals Amendments Act (H.R. 4885) – Required mandatory 15-year prison sentences for the possession of a firearm by persons with three convictions for drug trafficking or violent crime offenses. Signed into law by President Reagan October 27, 1986. (Note: H.R. 4885 became Subtitle I: Armed Career Criminals - Career Criminals Amendment Act of 1986, incorporated into H.R. 5484, the Anti-Drug Abuse Act of 1986 Archived 2012-12-17 at the Wayback Machine, an omnibus anti-drug measure that was signed into law on October 27, 1986 and became Public Law 99-570.)
- Armed Career Criminals Act (H.R. 6248) – Hughes was a cosponsor of this legislation reported from the Crime Subcommittee, which amends the Omnibus Crime Control and Safe Streets Act of 1968 to establish a mandatory sentence of 15 years and a fine of not more than $25,000 for persons possessing a firearm with three or more felony convictions during the commission of a burglary or robbery. Signed into law by President Reagan October 12, 1984. (Note: The provisions of H.R. 6248 became Chapter XVIII of H.J. Res. 648, making continuing appropriations for the fiscal year 1985, signed into law Oct. 12, 1984 (Public Law No. 98-473).)
- Firearm Owners Protection Act of 1986 (H.R. 4332) (Note: Passed House (Amended) by Yea-Nay Vote: 292 -130 (Record Vote No: 75), April 10, 1986; the House incorporated the text of H.R. 4331 into S. 49 which was approved by the Senate by voice vote on May 6, 1986.) – Reformed the 1968 Gun Control Act to eliminate red tape for gun owners and gun dealers, strengthened law enforcement, and increased penalties for the use of a firearm or silencer in a violent crime or drug trafficking offense (signed into law by President Reagan on July 8, 1986). This legislation also included the Hughes Amendment that prohibited civilian private possession of fully automatic firearms manufactured after May 19, 1986. The passage of the ban on fully automatic firearms has been controversial with many gun rights advocates. (Note: The Hughes Amendment was adopted by voice vote and some critics have complained that Congressman Charles B. Rangel (D-NY), who was chairing the House at the time, ruled that the amendment had been agreed to, although some attendees in the House chamber felt the "nays" outnumbered the "yeas" at the time.)

=== Environment ===
==== Ocean dumping, shore protection and marine pollution ====
Hughes' South Jersey congressional district encompassed much of New Jersey's 130 miles (210 km) of coastline and 1,792 miles (2,884 km) of tidal coastline, as well significant portions of the environmentally sensitive New Jersey Pinelands, the Maurice River and its tributaries, Cape May and Atlantic City beaches, and local agriculture, fishing and tourism areas. As a member of the House Committee on Merchant Marine and Fisheries, (Note: The House Committee on Merchant Marine and Fisheries was created in 1887 but was eliminated in 1995 as part of a House reform and reorganization adopted at the beginning of the 104th Congress. For a history of the Merchant Marine and Fisheries Committee, see the National Archives' "Guide to House Records: Chapter 15: Records of the Committee on Merchant Marine and Fisheries.) Hughes became deeply involved in ocean protection and environmental legislation. Hughes also served on the House Select Committee on the Outer Continental Shelf (OCS), (Note: The OCS Committee was created by House Resolution 412 - "to establish an Ad Hoc select committee on Outer Continental Shelf" — in 1975 to rewrite the Nation's laws concerning offshore oil and gas development.) an important assignment because the ocean waters off the coast of New Jersey and other mid-Atlantic states have often been looked to as future potential oil drilling sites.

In 1970, the President's Council on Environmental Quality issued a landmark report concluding that ocean dumping and other forms of marine pollution had resulted in serious environmental damage and posed a threat to human health. The report found that marine pollution had forced the closure of at least one-fifth of the Nation's commercial shellfish beds, beaches and bays had been closed to swimming and heavy fish kills had occurred. (Note: The report concluded that a critical need existed for a national policy on ocean dumping. The recommendation was endorsed by President Nixon and transmitted to the Congress on October 7, 1970. A legislative proposal to implement the Council's recommendations, the "Marine Protection Act of 1971" was also submitted to Congress at that time, which eventually became the Marine Protection, Research, and Sanctuaries Act of 1972, P.L. 92-532.) One area known as the New York Bight, some 12 miles (19 km) off the coast of New Jersey and Long Island, had been used by 25 municipalities and sewerage authorities in the New York City/Northern New Jersey area for sewage sludge disposal since 1924. New York dumpers accounted for more than half of the 5.5 million tons dumped annually in the Bight and Northern N.J. dumpers accounted for 34 percent.

In 1975, Hughes successfully offered the amendment for which he is perhaps best known, which banned the dumping of harmful sewage sludge and chemicals in the ocean after December 31, 1981. (Note: A bill to amend the Marine Protection, Research, and Sanctuaries Act of 1972 to authorize appropriations to carry out the provisions of such Act for fiscal year 1978.) The bill was signed into law by President Carter in November, 1977. Although the sludge dumping ban was opposed by Congressman John M. Murphy of New York, who was Chairman of the Merchant Marine and Fisheries Committee, Hughes was successful in getting enough votes in the Committee to defeat legislative efforts to delay the effective date. Under this law, more than 300 industries and municipalities, including New York City and Philadelphia, which had permits or were seeking permits to dump their wastes in the ocean, were required to switch to land-based disposal alternatives.

In 1981, New York City and several other municipalities sued the EPA and were successful in obtaining a court ruling that ocean dumping of sewage sludge could not be banned without full consideration of the costs and environmental consequences of alternative disposal methods. EPA did not appeal the court's ruling and, as a result, ocean dumping was allowed to continue. Congress subsequently passed legislation to extend the deadline, to allow more time for the U.S. Environmental Protection Agency to study the impact of ocean dumping and identify acceptable disposal alternatives. In 1984, the EPA closed the long-time New York Bight ocean dumping site and designated a 106-mile (171 km) site as its replacement. Nine municipal sewerage authorities, including New York City, began dumping their sludge at the 106-mile (171 km) site in 1986.

Hughes responded by writing new legislation to ban the ocean dumping of harmful sewage sludge and chemicals which was enacted into law in 1988, and which banned ocean dumping after December 31, 1991. New York City missed the deadline by a few months, but ultimately became the last municipality to comply with the law, getting out of the ocean on June 30, 1992. It took 17 years, but Hughes finally prevailed in his effort to ban the dumping of harmful sewage sludge and chemicals in the ocean.

In addition to his work on ocean dumping of sewage sludge, Hughes also advocated a number of measures to reduce marine pollution from other sources including measures to ban the disposal of plastic debris and medical wastes at sea. Hughes authored H.R. 5225, the Health Waste Anti-Dumping Act of 1988, which passed the House of Representatives in September 1988, and also sponsored or cosponsored several other bills on medical waste, (Note: These included: H.R. 5231, the Medical Waste Sanctions Act of 1988; H.R. 3478, to amend the Marine Protection, Research, and Sanctuaries Act of 1972 and the Federal Water Pollution Control Act of 1977 to ban the dumping of medical waste in ocean and navigable waters and to amend the Solid Waste Disposal Act to authorize the Environmental Protection Agency to regulate medical waste to protect public health and the environment; H.R. 3515, Medical Waste Tracking Act of 1988; H.R. 5119, the New Jersey-New York Medical Waste Tracking Act of 1988) which either became law or had provisions that were ultimately included in S. 2030, the Ocean Dumping Ban Act of 1988. He also championed several measures to prevent the disposal of plastic debris in the ocean, culminating in the enactment of the Marine Plastic Pollution Research and Control Act of 1987 as part of the United States-Japan Fishery Agreement Approval Act of 1987.

Hughes won approval of numerous measures over the years to help maintain and protect South Jersey's many miles of beaches and inland waterways, which provide significant support for the local economy. Hughes sponsored and helped fund a long-awaited project in Cape May to rebuild the beach and protect the U.S. Coast Guard Training Center from erosion. Also, over his 20 years in Congress, Hughes worked to secure millions of additional dollars to dredge the Intracoastal Waterway and develop low-cost erosion control projects along the coastline.

==== New Jersey Pinelands ====
Although the New Jersey Pinelands is located in the most urbanized state in the nation, it is the largest tract of open space on the mid-Atlantic Coast with one of the cleanest aquifers in the world. To help protect the Pinelands' unique natural and cultural resources from encroaching development, in 1977 Hughes introduced H.R. 9539, the Pinelands Preservation Act. Hughes subsequently joined with Senators Harrison A. Williams and Clifford P. Case, and Reps. Edwin B. Forsythe and James Florio in coauthoring a historic law enacted in 1978 that established the Pinelands National Reserve in New Jersey. (Note: The National Parks and Recreation Act, signed into law Nov. 10, 1978. Became Public Law 95-625.) The federal law was followed by subsequent enactment of N.J. State legislation (Note: Pinelands Protection Act, P.L. 1979 c. 111.) creating the New Jersey Pinelands Commission to manage and protect the resources of nearly a million acres (4,000 km²) of the Pinelands.

=== Aging and other activities ===
Hughes also served on the House Select Committee on Aging, which he chaired in 1993, the Select Committee on Narcotics Abuse and Control, and the House Select Committee on the Outer Continental Shelf (OCS).

In 1986, Hughes was one of the House impeachment managers who prosecuted the case in the impeachment trial of Judge Harry E. Claiborne. Claiborne was found guilty by the United States Senate and removed from his federal judgeship.

== U.S. Ambassador to Panama ==
Bill Hughes was nominated in early 1995 by President Bill Clinton to serve as U.S. Ambassador to Panama. He was confirmed by the U.S. Senate on September 29, 1995, and presented his credentials to President Ernesto Pérez Balladares in early November 1995. When he began his tour in 1995, Panama had become a major transit country for drugs mostly cocaine coming from South America, and money laundering was also a major problem. Panama has been viewed as "ideally positioned for illicit financial transactions and drug smuggling."

As the Ambassador to Panama, Hughes was responsible for an Embassy of about 425 employees and 21 agencies, including a sizable law enforcement and intelligence component. The United States Southern Command was then based in Panama, so one of Hughes' major functions was to coordinate with the U.S. military. Most of the counter-narcotics missions were directed out of Howard Air Force Base in Panama. From the Multi-national Counter Narcotics Center (MCNC) at Howard, AWAC and other equipment was deployed into South America. The 177th Fighter Wing, based in Pomona, N.J. rotated out of Panama during his tour and provided air cover for the AWAC operations.

Hughes was also an ex officio member of the Panama Canal Commission and was charged with the responsibility of coordinating the work of the Commission with the Republic of Panama. The central mission of the Commission as well as the Embassy was to lead a successful turnover of the Panama Canal in December 1999 and, as the principal U.S. representative in Panama, Hughes actively participated in the planning and execution process. The military was also responsible for turning over about six remaining military facilities to the Republic of Panama, and Hughes was the lead civilian representing the U.S. government. Between 1995 and 1998, most of the military facilities were turned over to Panama, including some of the more controversial properties such as the bombing ranges and target practice areas, where there was a presence of unexploded ordnance. This required many trips to Washington and meetings with the Panama Foreign Ministry, with Hughes serving as the lead representative for the U.S. In addition to his work overseeing the transfer of military bases and the coordination of the Canal and negotiation of transfer agreements, Hughes led the following efforts:

- Establishment of the first Financial Analysis Unit in the Southern Hemisphere
- Creation of a new initiative to combat alien smuggling, including an increase in the size of the U.S. Embassy to 21 agencies
- Passage of new laws patterned after those in the U.S. to set up an intellectual property regime in Panama, including the creation of a new enforcement unit to fight IP piracy. Formal training was provided to the new unit as well as a public program to create an awareness of the damage caused by IP piracy
- Substantial increase in the size of the Coast Guard, acquisition of surplus boats from the U.S., and the creation of refueling and provisioning stations along the coast, including on the Colombian border
- Creation of a forfeiture law to seize drug assets, including money, airplanes, boats and vehicles. By the time Hughes left Panama, the Coast Guard had seized about 10 vessels and was using them in the battle against the traffickers
- Development of a multi-force border control unit and a comprehensive strategy to combat smuggling at the border with Costa Rica. Most of the contraband seized was destined for the U.S.
- Hughes also participated with the Southern Command, the State Department and others in an effort to negotiate new Treaty rights to advance the U.S.'s counter-narcotics strategy in the Southern Hemisphere.

== Honorary regard ==
The FAA Technical Center in southern New Jersey was renamed to the William J. Hughes Technical Center in his honor. The Bill & Nancy Hughes Performing Arts Center in the Ocean City High School is named in honor of the community service and local contributions of Congressman Hughes and his wife, Nancy. In Cape May, the beach known as Trenton Beach was renamed in perpetuity as The Congressman William J. Hughes Beach. Additionally, in 1995, the Borough of Penns Grove in Salem County renamed Church Street—the street where Hughes grew up—in his honor. Hughes was named Congressman of the Year by the National Association of Police Organizations (1986). He is a past recipient of the Book of Golden Deeds Award from the Exchange Club of Ocean City (1975), the Leo Fraser Super Achiever Award from the Juvenile Diabetes Foundation (1987), and the Arthur E. Armitage, Sr. Distinguished Alumni Award from Rutgers University (1988).

== Election history ==
Prior to his appointment as Ambassador, Hughes served 10 terms in the U.S. House of Representatives, representing New Jersey's Second Congressional District longer than anyone in history. He first ran for Congress in 1970 when he challenged incumbent Congressman Charles W. Sandman Jr. and lost by fewer than 5,000 votes. Hughes did not run for office in 1972 but again sought election to Congress in 1974 and won with 57% of the vote as one of the so-called "Watergate Babies" who were swept into office in the wake of the Watergate Scandal and the resignation of President Richard Nixon. In 1976, Hughes faced Assemblyman James R. Hurley of Millville in his first reelection bid and won with 62% of the vote. In subsequent elections, Hughes' winning percentage averaged 60%. During the 1984 election, Hughes outpolled President Reagan in his district by a margin of 63% to 62%. He outpolled President Bush in 1988 by 66% to 58%, and outpolled President Clinton by 57% to 40%.

New Jersey's 2nd congressional district: Results 1970, 1974–1992
Year	Democrat	Votes	Pct	Republican	Votes	Pct	3rd Party	Party	Votes	Pct	
1970	William Hughes	64,882	48%	Charles W. Sandman Jr.	69,392	52%					
1974	William Hughes	109,763	57%	Charles W. Sandman Jr.	79,064	41%	Andrew Wenger	Independent	2,693	1%	
1976	William Hughes	141,753	62%	James R. Hurley	87,915	38%					
1978	William Hughes	112,768	66%	James H. Biggs	56,997	34%					
1980	William Hughes	135,437	57%	Beech N. Fox	97,072	41%	Robert C. Rothhouse	Libertarian	2,262	1%	*
1982	William Hughes	102,826	68%	John J. Mahoney	47,069	31%	Bruce Powers	Libertarian	1,233	1%	
1984	William Hughes	132,841	63%	Raymond G. Massie	77,231	37%					
1986	William Hughes	83,821	68%	Alfred J. Bennington Jr.	35,167	29%	Len Smith	Pro Life, Anti-Abortion	3,812	3%	
1988	William Hughes	134,505	66%	Kirk W. Conover	67,759	33%	Richard A. Schindewolf Jr.	Pro-Life Conservative	2,372	1%	
1990	William Hughes	97,698	88%	(no candidate)			William A. Kanengiser	Populist	13,120	12%	
1992	William Hughes	132,465	56%	Frank A. LoBiondo	98,315	42%	Roger W. Bacon	Libertarian	2,575	1%	*

* Minor candidate notes: In 1980, Adele Frisch ran from the Socialist Labor party and garnered 939 votes (<1%). In 1992, Joseph Ponczek ran under the Anti-Tax party and had 2,067 votes (1%) cast for him; Andrea Lippi ran under the "Freedom, Equality, Prosperity" party and got 1,605 votes (1%).

== See also ==
- New Jersey's congressional delegations

== Notes ==
U.S. House of Representatives
Preceded by Charles W. Sandman Jr.	Member of the U.S. House of Representatives from New Jersey's 2nd congressional district 1975–1995	Succeeded by Frank A. LoBiondo
Diplomatic posts
Preceded by Oliver P. Garza	United States Ambassador to Panama; November 7, 1995–October 13, 1998	Succeeded by Simon Ferro
