= Nelson Albano =

American Democratic Party politician

Member of the New Jersey General Assembly from the 1st district
- In office January 10, 2006 – January 14, 2014
- Preceded by: John C. Gibson
- Succeeded by: Sam Fiocchi

Personal details
- Born: March 11, 1954 (age 72)
- Website: Legislative web page

Nelson Albano (born March 11, 1954) is an American Democratic Party politician, who served in the New Jersey General Assembly where he represented the 1st Legislative District, having taken office on January 10, 2006. Albano was elected to the Assembly on November 8, 2005, unseating John C. Gibson, who had held the seat from 2004 to 2006 (and also served in the Assembly from 1992 to 2002).

Albano served in the Assembly on the Agriculture and Natural Resources Committee (as Chair) and on the Law and Public Safety Committee (as vice-chair). Albano lost reelection in 2013 and was succeeded by Sam Fiocchi.

== Career ==
A native of Vineland, Albano has been active in South Jersey as an advocate for children, families and victim's rights. His 19-year-old son, Michael, was killed in 2001 by a drunk driver who had four previous convictions for drunk driving. In his son's memory, he successfully lobbied to have "Michael's Law" enacted, which stiffens penalties for repeat drunk drivers, imposing prison terms in some cases, and encouraging those convicted to seek treatment for alcoholism.

Albano has been involved with organizations helping children and their families, such as raising thousands of dollars for Mothers Against Drunk Driving (MADD). Albano and his wife have received awards from the New Jersey Senate and the Assembly for the work they have done for the FATAL organization which makes presentations to children in schools about the tragic consequences of drunk driving. He and his family received the Equal Justice Award by the New Jersey Association of Crime Victims Advocates for their efforts and pursuit of "Michael's Law".

Another such organization is the Gabriel Project where Albano has been involved with since it started in 1990, raising over $13,000 to help bring seriously ill children to the United States for heart surgery from Africa.

Albano was assistant director of the Harley Owners Group of Cumberland County where he participated in charity rides to raise funds for various organizations. Albano is working with an avid group of riders from the tri-county area to raise money for the hungry and the homeless through an event in June.

Albano attended Sacred Heart High School in Vineland. He then continued his education to earn a Journeymanship in Electrical Trades from the Cumberland County Vocational Technical School. He is a resident of Vineland, New Jersey.

== Religious and Civic Memberships ==
Albano is a member of the Christian Missionary Alliance Church and is a volunteer in the Gabriel Project. A member of the United Food and Commercial Workers Union for 28 years, Nelson used to represent his fellow union members as shop steward at Village Supermarkets in Vineland prior to his retirement.
