= Frank LoBiondo =

American politician (born 1946)

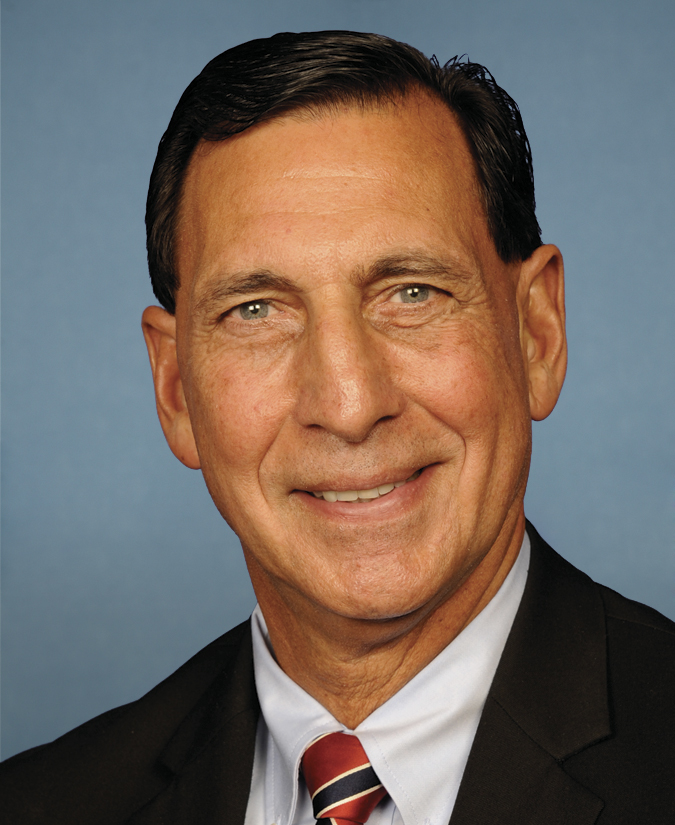

Member of the U.S. House of Representatives from New Jersey's 2nd district
- In office January 3, 1995 – January 3, 2019
- Preceded by: William Hughes
- Succeeded by: Jeff Van Drew

Member of the New Jersey General Assembly from the 1st district
- In office January 12, 1988 – January 3, 1995
- Preceded by: Joseph W. Chinnici; Guy F. Muziani
- Succeeded by: Nicholas Asselta

Member of the Cumberland County, New Jersey Board of Chosen Freeholders
- In office 1985–1987

Personal details
- Born: Frank Alo LoBiondo; May 12, 1946 (age 80) Bridgeton, New Jersey, U.S.
- Party: Republican
- Spouse(s): Jan LoBiondo (divorced) Tina Ercole (m. 2004)
- Children: 2
- Education: Saint Joseph's University (BA)

Frank Alo LoBiondo (/ˌloʊbiˈɒndoʊ/: born May 12, 1946) is an American businessman and politician who served as the U.S. representative for New Jersey's 2nd congressional district from 1995 to 2019. He is a member of the Republican Party. He represented all of Atlantic, Cape May, Cumberland and Salem Counties and parts of Camden, Gloucester, Burlington, and Ocean Counties. In November 2017, LoBiondo announced that he would retire from Congress at the end of his term, and did not seek re-election in 2018.

== Early life, education, and business career ==
Born in Bridgeton, LoBiondo was raised on a farm in the Rosenhayn section of Deerfield Township. He attended Georgetown Preparatory School, and received a B.A. in Business Administration from Saint Joseph's University in Philadelphia, Pennsylvania. He worked for twenty-six years in a family-owned trucking company.

== Early political career ==
LoBiondo served on the Cumberland County Board of Chosen Freeholders from 1985 to 1987. In 1987, he was elected to New Jersey's 1st Legislative district in the lower chamber of the New Jersey General Assembly and served from 1988 to 1994. He won re-election in 1989, 1991, and 1993.

== U.S. House of Representatives ==
=== Elections ===
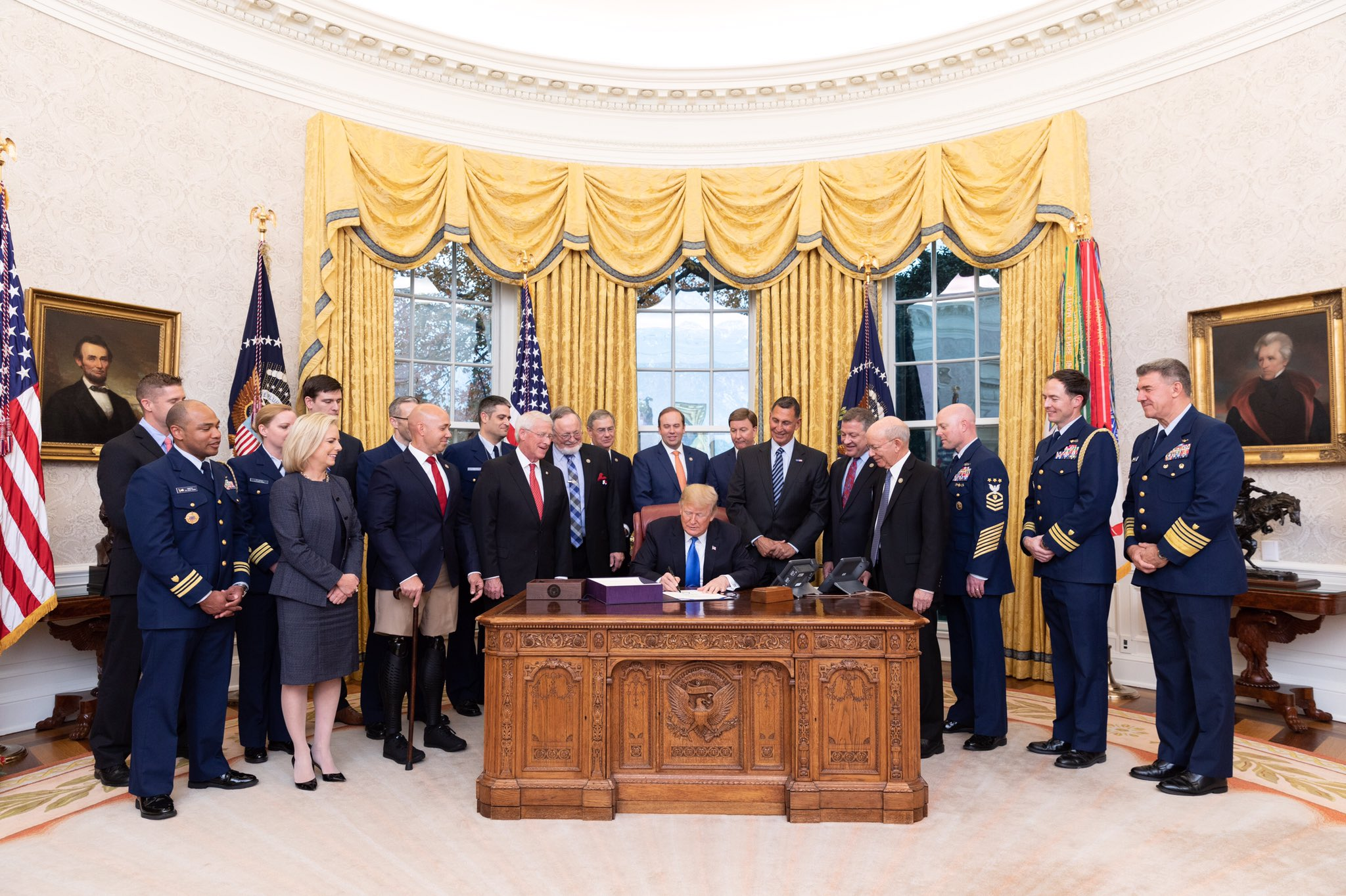
LoBiondo watches as President Donald Trump signs The Frank LoBiondo Coast Guard Authorization Act of 2018

In 1992, LoBiondo ran for the U.S. House of Representatives, but was defeated by incumbent Democrat William Hughes by a wide margin. When Hughes declined to run for re-election in 1994, LoBiondo ran again and was elected to the House. He was a member of the Republican freshman class elected in the 1994 midterm election and was part of Speaker Newt Gingrich's Contract with America. From that point on, he won every reelection bid with at least 59% of the vote even though he represented a district that was considered marginally Democratic-leaning on paper. In 2012, his district gave President Barack Obama 54% of the vote. In 2016 the district gave President Donald J. Trump a 5-point victory over Democrat Hillary Clinton.

==== 2014 ====
LoBiondo ran for reelection to the U.S. House in 2014. He won the Republican nomination in the primary election on June 3, 2014. He faced Democrat William J. Hughes, his predecessor's son, in the general election.

He was endorsed by Gov. Chris Christie, the Laborers’ International Union of North America, the U.S. Chamber of Commerce, the New Jersey State Building & Construction Trades Council, and the New Jersey State Fraternal Order of Police.

==== 2016 ====
Lobiondo was reelected to the U.S. House in 2016. He did not have a challenger in the Republican primary and was victorious over Democrat David Cole in the general election.

=== Committee assignments ===
- Committee on Armed Services
  - Subcommittee on Tactical Air and Land Forces
  - Subcommittee on Readiness
- Committee on Transportation and Infrastructure
  - Subcommittee on Aviation (Chair)
  - Subcommittee on Coast Guard and Maritime Transportation
  - Subcommittee on Highways and Transit
- Permanent Select Committee on Intelligence

=== Caucus memberships ===
- Congressional Arts Caucus

=== Embezzlement by campaign treasurer ===
On March 4, 2011, Andrew J. McCrosson Jr., who served as treasurer of LoBiondo's congressional campaign committee from 1995 until August 2010, pleaded guilty in federal district court to charges of embezzling more than $458,000 from campaign accounts over a fifteen-year period. The charges included one count of wire fraud and one count of converting funds contributed to a federal candidate. LoBiondo's campaign attorney called this "an abuse of the trust placed in him by the campaign." McCrosson was sentenced 30 months in prison.

== Electoral history ==
New Jersey's 2nd congressional district: Results 1992–2010
Year	Democrat	Votes	Pct	Republican	Votes	Pct	3rd Party	Party	Votes	Pct	3rd Party	Party	Votes	Pct	3rd Party	Party	Votes	Pct	3rd Party	Party	Votes	Pct
1992	William J. Hughes	132,465	56%	Frank A. LoBiondo	98,315	41%	Roger W. Bacon	Libertarian	2,575	1%	Joseph Ponczek	Anti-Tax	2,067	1%	Andrea Lippi	Freedom, Equality, Prosperity	1,605	1%				
1994	Louis N. Magazzu	56,151	35%	Frank A. LoBiondo	102,566	65%																
1996	Ruth Katz	83,890	38%	Frank A. LoBiondo	133,131	60%	David Rodger Headrick	Independent	1,439	1%	Judith Lee Azaren	Independent	1,174	1%	Andrea Lippi	Independent	1,084	<1%				
1998	Derek Hunsberger	43,563	31%	Frank A. LoBiondo	93,248	66%	Glenn Campbell	Independent	2,955	2%	Mary A. Whittam	Independent	1,748	1%								
2000	Edward G. Janosik	74,632	32%	Frank A. LoBiondo	155,187	66%	Robert Gabrielsky	Independent	3,252	1%	Constantino Rozzo	Independent	788	<1%								
2002	Steven A. Farkas	47,735	28%	Frank A. LoBiondo	116,834	69%	Roger Merle	Green	1,739	1%	Michael J. Matthews, Jr.	Libertarian	1,720	1%	Costantino Rozzo	Socialist	771	<1%				
2004	Timothy J. Robb	86,792	33%	Frank A. LoBiondo	172,779	65%	Willie Norwood	Jobs Equality Business	1,993	1%	Michael J. Matthews, Jr.	Libertarian	1,767	1%	Jose David Alcantara	Green	1,516	1%	Costantino Rozzo	Socialist Party USA	595	<1%
2006	Viola Thomas-Hughes	62,364	35%	Frank A. LoBiondo	109,040	62%	Robert E. Mullock	Preserve Green Space	1,993	2%	Lynn Merle	A New Direction	957	1%	Thomas Fanslau	We The People	587	<1%	Willie Norwood	Socialist Party USA	368	<1%
2008	David C. Kurkowski	110,990	39%	Frank A. LoBiondo	167,701	59%	Jason M. Grover	Green	1,763	1%	Peter Frank Boyce	Constitution	1,551	1%	Gary Stein	Rock the Boat	1,312	<1%	Costantino Rozzo	Socialist Party USA	648	<1%
2010	Gary Stein	51,690	31%	Frank A. LoBiondo	109,460	66%	Peter Frank Boyce	Constitution	4,120	2%	Mark Lovett	Independent	1,123	1%	Vitov Valdes-Munoz	American Labor Party	727	<1%				

== Political positions ==
LoBiondo was a member of the moderate Republican Main Street Partnership. His record on several issues, particularly the environment and labor union votes, fitted a moderate Republican. In 2005, National Journal ranked him as the most liberal Republican representative in New Jersey and more liberal than most of New York's Republican congressional representatives. Americans for Democratic Action in 2005 placed him in a higher liberal quotient than most of the Republican representatives in those two states.

LoBiondo was ranked as the 13th most bipartisan member of the U.S. House of Representatives during the 114th United States Congress (and the most bipartisan member of the U.S. House of Representatives from New Jersey) in the Bipartisan Index created by The Lugar Center and the McCourt School of Public Policy that ranks members of the United States Congress by their degree of bipartisanship (by measuring the frequency each member's bills attract co-sponsors from the opposite party and each member's co-sponsorship of bills by members of the opposite party).

=== Abortion ===
LoBiondo opposes taxpayer-funded abortion except in cases of incest, rape or threat to the life of the mother. He consistently voted against federal funding for abortion whenever it came to a vote.

=== Cannabis ===
LoBiondo has a "B" grade from National Organization for the Reform of Marijuana Laws (NORML) for his voting record regarding cannabis-related matters. He has supported the Veterans Equal Access Amendment, which provides veterans information on accessing medical marijuana based on state law.

=== Donald Trump ===
He endorsed Chris Christie in the Republican primary. In the general election he supported the GOP ticket but rescinded his support for Republican nominee Donald Trump in October 2016 after the Donald Trump and Billy Bush recording surfaced, but ultimately ended up voting for him.

=== Economy ===
He voted against the $15 billion bailout for GM and Chrysler in 2008. as well as the 2008 Troubled Asset Relief Program. In early 2008, he voted against the American Recovery and Reinvestment Act of 2009. In December 2017, he voted against the Tax Cuts and Jobs Act of 2017.

=== Environment and energy ===
LoBiondo has been endorsed by various environmental groups including the League of Conservation Voters. An advocate for alternative energy sources especially nuclear power, he has consistently opposed offshore drilling off the coast of New Jersey, sponsoring legislation in each Congress during the past decade.

=== Foreign policy ===
Considered a defense hawk in Congress, LoBiondo was a member of the House Armed Services Committee and joined in the bipartisan support of the wars in Afghanistan and Iraq. In 2013, LoBiondo opposed President Obama's request for congressional authorization to use force against the Assad regime in Syria.

=== Gambling ===
In 2012, LoBiondo, along with Democratic congressman Frank Pallone, introduced legislation allowing states to legalize sports betting, then only allowed in four states, arguing it would strengthen Atlantic City as a venue for tourists’ dollars.

=== Healthcare ===
He is in favor of repealing the Affordable Care Act (Obamacare), and voted in favor of the resolution that began the process of repealing Obamacare in January 2017. In 2013, he said that Obamacare was "too deeply flawed to implement and ultimately unworkable."

=== LGBT rights ===
LoBiondo was endorsed by Garden State Equality in his 2016 election and a cosponsor of the federal Employment Non-Discrimination Act that would bar discrimination against LGBT individuals in the workplace. In 2011, LoBiondo appeared in an It Gets Better Project video, part of a YouTube campaign reaching out to young gay teens who have been bullied and is a cosponsor of the Safe Schools Improvement Act to respond to bullying of LGBT students in schools.

=== Tax reform ===
LoBiondo voted against the Tax Cuts and Jobs Act of 2017. He opposed the bill due to the $10,000 cap on deductions that he described as being "detrimental in my high-tax state of New Jersey."

=== Term limits ===
In 1994, LoBiondo pledged to only serve six terms in Congress. In 2004, he announced that he would break his term limits pledge and allow the voters to decide. He retired after twelve terms.

=== Veterans ===
LoBiondo has made improving VA services in South Jersey a top priority while in Congress, including new clinics in Northfield, Vineland and Cape May Court House (to open in late 2018). He has introduced the Veterans Health ID Act, a bill that would allow veterans to receive an ID card that allows them care at VA expense at any non-VA medical facility.

U.S. House of Representatives
Preceded by William Hughes	Member of the U.S. House of Representatives from New Jersey's 2nd congressional district 1995–2019	Succeeded by Jeff Van Drew
U.S. order of precedence (ceremonial)
Preceded by Rodney Frelinghuysen as Former U.S. Representative	Order of precedence of the United States as Former U.S. Representative	Succeeded by Nancy Johnson as Former U.S. Representative
