= Bob Andrzejczak =

American politician

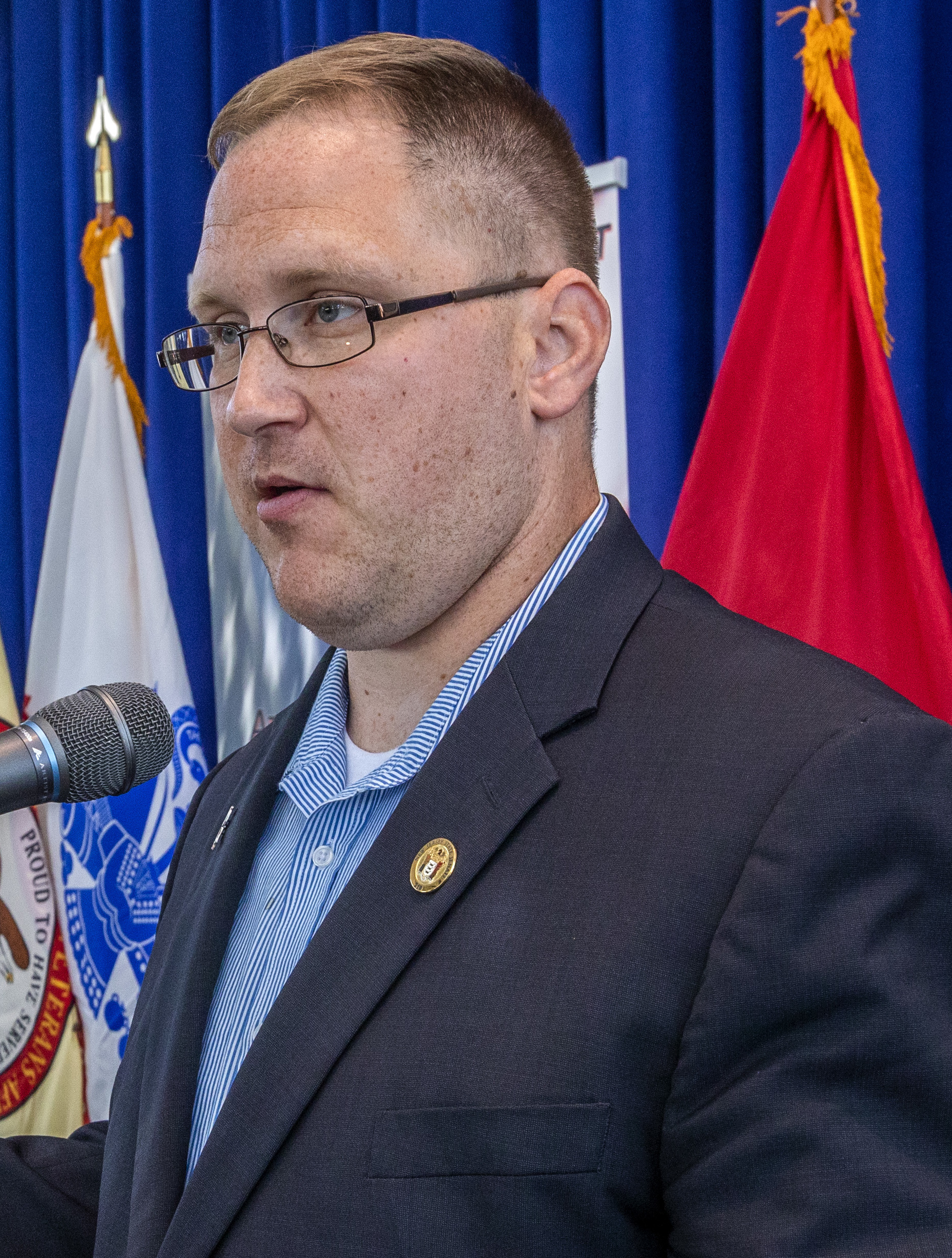

Member of the New Jersey Senate from the 1st district
- In office January 15, 2019 – December 5, 2019
- Preceded by: Jeff Van Drew
- Succeeded by: Mike Testa

Member of the New Jersey General Assembly from the 1st district
- In office March 21, 2013 – January 14, 2019
- Preceded by: Matthew Milam
- Succeeded by: Matthew Milam

Chair of the Assembly Agriculture and Natural Resources Committee
- In office January 14, 2014 – January 14, 2019
- Preceded by: Nelson T. Albano
- Succeeded by: Eric Houghtaling

Personal details
- Born: May 1, 1986 (age 40)
- Party: Democratic (before 2025); Independent (2025–present)
- Spouse: Trisha Andrzejczak
- Children: 2
- Website: Legislative website

Military service
- Years of service: 2005–2010
- Rank: Sergeant
- Unit: 25th Infantry Division
- Battles/wars: Iraq War
- Awards: Bronze Star; Purple Heart

Robert John "Bob" Andrzejczak (born May 1, 1986) is an American Democratic Party politician who represented the 1st Legislative District in the New Jersey State Senate from January 15, 2019, when he was appointed to fill the vacancy created by the resignation of Jeff Van Drew, until December 5, 2019. Andrzejczak previously served in the New Jersey General Assembly from March 21, 2013, to January 14, 2019, when he was appointed to fill the vacancy created by the resignation of Matthew W. Milam.

== Early life ==
Andrzejczak was raised in the North Cape May section of Lower Township, New Jersey, and graduated from Lower Cape May Regional High School in 2004. He attended the Williamson College in Media, Pennsylvania, before joining the United States Army in 2005. Andrzejczak had served in the Iraq War as a sergeant in the Army's 25th Infantry Division until his discharge following an injury from a grenade explosion which led to the amputation of his left leg in 2009. As a result, he was awarded the Purple Heart and Bronze Star; his recovery was featured on a 2009 episode of The Oprah Winfrey Show. Following his return from military service, Andrzejczak joined the Cape May Veterans of Foreign Wars where he became active in veterans' issues.

== New Jersey Assembly ==
After Matthew W. Milam resigned from his seat in the Assembly on February 28, 2013, Andrzejczak was appointed to the Assembly after being selected by Democratic committee members from Atlantic, Cape May and Cumberland counties. He was sworn in on March 21, 2013, and subsequently won election to a full term in 2013. Andrzejczak is a resident of Middle Township. He is married to his wife Trisha, with whom he has two children. He resigned from the Assembly on January 14, 2019.

=== Committee assignments ===
- Agriculture and Natural Resources
- Military and Veteran Affairs
- Intergovernmental Relations Commission

== New Jersey Senate ==
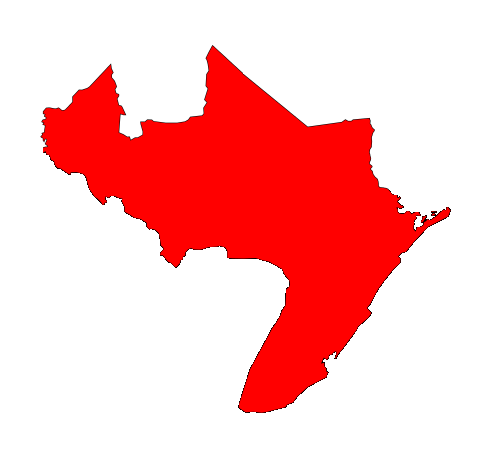
New Jersey Legislative District 1

On November 5, 2018, 1st District State Senator Jeff Van Drew won a seat to the United States House of Representatives, creating a vacancy for his state senate seat. On January 6, 2019, Van Drew formally nominated Bob Andrzejczak for his replacement, which the Democratic Committees of the 1st Legislative District approved unanimously. On January 15, the state senate formally swore in Andrzejczak as state senator.

=== Tenure ===
Andrzejczak has said he is opposed to the legalization of Marijuana in 2019. The Chairman of the Cumberland County GOP Mike Testa has announced he would challenge Andrzejczak in the 2019 special election. In the first quarter of 2019 Testa out-raised Andrzejczak 6 to 1. Testa went on to beat Andrzejczak in the November special election.

=== Committee assignments ===
- Military and Veterans Affairs
- Joint Committee on Public Schools
- Budget and Appropriations

== District 1 ==
New Jersey's 1st Legislative District encompasses parts of Atlantic County, New Jersey, Cumberland County, New Jersey, and all of Cape May County, New Jersey. The current representatives from the 1st district to the 218th New Jersey Legislature are:

- Senator Bob Andrzejczak (D)
- Assemblyman Bruce Land (D)
- Assemblyman Matthew Milam (D)

== Electoral history ==
=== New Jersey Senate ===
2019 special election
Party	Candidate	Votes	%	±%
Republican	Mike Testa	27,163	53.5	▲19.5
Democratic	Bob Andrzejczak (incumbent)	23,636	46.5	▼18.3
Total votes		50,799	100.0	

=== New Jersey Assembly ===
2017 New Jersey general election
Party	Candidate	Votes	%	±%
Democratic	Bob Andrzejczak (incumbent)	32,554	31.2	▲3.3
Democratic	R. Bruce Land (incumbent)	30,938	29.7	▲3.3
Republican	James R. Sauro	20,445	19.6	▼3.0
Republican	Robert G. Campbell	20,250	19.4	▼3.8
Total votes		104,187	100.0	

2015 New Jersey general election
Party	Candidate	Votes	%	±%
Democratic	Bob Andrzejczak (incumbent)	20,231	27.9	▲0.7
Democratic	R. Bruce Land	19,140	26.4	▲2.2
Republican	Sam Fiocchi (incumbent)	16,818	23.2	▼1.8
Republican	Jim Sauro	16,395	22.6	▼0.9
Total votes		72,584	100.0	

2013 New Jersey general election
Party	Candidate	Votes	%	±%
Democratic	Bob Andrzejczak (incumbent)	29,958	27.2	▲2.2
Republican	Sam Fiocchi	27,539	25.0	▲1.2
Democratic	Nelson Albano (incumbent)	26,611	24.2	▼3.7
Republican	Kristine Gabor	25,903	23.5	▲0.1
Total votes		110,011	100.0	

New Jersey Senate
Preceded by Jeff Van Drew	Member of the New Jersey Senate from the 1st District; January 15, 2019 – December 5, 2019	Succeeded by Mike Testa
New Jersey General Assembly
Preceded by Matthew W. Milam	Member of the New Jersey General Assembly for the 1st District; March 21, 2013 – January 15, 2019; With: Nelson Albano, Sam Fiocchi, R. Bruce Land	Succeeded by Matthew W. Milam
