= Vineland High School =

Public high school in Cumberland County, New Jersey, US

Location
- 2880 East Chestnut Avenue; Vineland, Cumberland County, New Jersey 08361; United States; 39.476528°N 74.972808°W

Information
- Type: Public high school
- Motto: "Enter to learn, go forth to serve."
- Established: 1870 (as Vineland High School); 1963 (South Campus); 1976 (North Campus)
- School district: Vineland Public Schools
- NCES School ID: 341680001902
- Principal: Justin Adams (Tanner); Rafael Maysonet (Asselta)
- Faculty: 187.0 FTEs
- Grades: 9-12
- Enrollment: 2,736 (as of 2024–25)
- Student to teacher ratio: 14.6:1
- Colors: Red gray
- Athletics conference: Cape-Atlantic League (general); West Jersey Football League (football)
- Mascot: Rowdy Rooster
- Team name: Fighting Clan
- Rivals: Mainland Regional High School; Millville High School
- Accreditation: Middle States Association of Colleges and Schools
- Website: www.vineland.org/o/vshs

Vineland High School is a four-year comprehensive public high school located in Vineland, in Cumberland County, in the U.S. state of New Jersey, serving students in ninth through twelfth grades as part of the Vineland Public Schools. The now reunified school operates from a south campus that had been Vineland Senior High School South (which opened in 1963) and a north campus that was formerly Vineland Senior High School North (opened in 1976). The original high school in Vineland dates back to 1870, and the 1927 Vineland High School structure was added to the National Register of Historic Places on March 3, 1995, and is now used as district offices. The school is accredited until July 2026 and has been accredited by the Middle States Association of Colleges and Schools Commission on Elementary and Secondary Schools since 1936; The school's accreditation status was extended for seven years in Fall 2018.

As of the 2024–25 school year, the school had an enrollment of 2,736 students and 187.0 classroom teachers (on an FTE basis), for a student–teacher ratio of 14.6:1. There were 1,506 students (55.0% of enrollment) eligible for free lunch and 181 (6.6% of students) eligible for reduced-cost lunch. Based on 2021–22 data from the New Jersey Department of Education, it was the ninth-largest high school in the state and one of 29 schools with more than 2,000 students.

== History ==
Vineland High School had served students from neighboring communities, as part of sending/receiving relationships with the Buena Regional School District (comprised of Buena and Buena Vista Township for grades 10-12), and from Newfield, Pittsgrove Township and Weymouth Township for grades 9-12. With significant overcrowding at the high school and substantial growth in enrollment from students residing in Vineland, the sending districts were informed in November 1968 that they would no longer be accommodated in Vineland and that all sending students would be phased out by the end of the 1973-74 school year.

Buena Regional High School was constructed to serve an estimated 900 students from the Buena Regional, Estell Manor and Weymouth Township districts, with plans to open for the 1972-73 school year. The Pittsgrove Township School District constructed Arthur P. Schalick High School, which opened in September 1976 for 800 township students who had previously been sent to either Bridgeton High School or Vineland High School.

A proposed dress code, that had been slated to take effect for the 2006–07 school year, gave way to controversy and debate among students and parents.

== Awards, recognition and rankings ==
The school was the 264th-ranked public high school in New Jersey out of 339 schools statewide in New Jersey Monthly magazine's September 2014 cover story on the state's "Top Public High Schools", using a new ranking methodology. The school had been ranked 297th in the state of 328 schools in 2012, after being ranked 275th in 2010 out of 322 schools listed. The magazine ranked the school 222nd in 2008 out of 316 schools. The school was ranked 194th in the magazine's September 2006 issue, which surveyed 316 schools across the state.

== Curriculum ==
Due to its large student body Vineland High is able to offer a wide range of elective classes topics include arts and design, computers, media, automobile repair, woodworking, as well as a wide range of Advanced Placement courses. Courses such as English, mathematics, history, and science are tracked into college preparatory, advanced college preparatory, and honors. Students are tracked into honors mathematics and science from middle school.

=== Requirements for graduation ===
Courses required to be taken in order to graduate are four years of English, three years of Mathematics, two years of United States History, one year of World History, three years of Science, one year of Fine, Practical and/or Performing arts, one year of a Vocational course, and one year of a World Language, and four years of Physical Education/Health. It is also required to do 40 hours of service learning. However, a student may do 100 hours of service learning to receive a cord for their graduation ceremony.

== Athletics ==
The Vineland High School Fighting Clan compete in the Atlantic Division of the Cape-Atlantic League, an athletic conference comprised of public and private high schools in Atlantic, Cape May, Cumberland and Gloucester counties, and operates under the aegis of the New Jersey State Interscholastic Athletic Association (NJSIAA). With 1,916 students in grades 10-12, the school was classified by the NJSIAA for the 2019–20 school year as Group IV for most athletic competition purposes, which included schools with an enrollment of 1,060 to 5,049 students in that grade range. The football team competes in the Continental Division of the 94-team West Jersey Football League superconference and was classified by the NJSIAA as Group V South for football for 2024–2026, which included schools with 1,333 to 2,324 students.

Vineland High School has participated since 1893 in an annual Thanksgiving football game with Millville High School, in Millville. The rivalry is one of the oldest public high school rivalry in the United States and the state's oldest, with Vineland leading the series 65-62-19, after Vineland's 28–18 victory in the 146th game in the series in 2017. The rivalry with Millville was listed at 6th on NJ.com's 2017 list "Ranking the 31 fiercest rivalries in N.J. HS football".

There is a longstanding swim team rivalry between Vineland and Mainland Regional High School.

Vineland High School's interscholastic athletic teams include:

- Girls Crew
- Girls Track
- Girls Tennis
- Girls Soccer
- Girls Softball
- Girls Swimming
- Girls Basketball
- Girls Field Hockey
- Girls Cross Country
- Boys Crew
- Boys Track
- Boys Tennis
- Boys Soccer
- Boys Baseball
- Boys Lacrosse
- Boys Swimming
- Boys Wrestling
- Boys Basketball
- Boys Cross Country
- Co-ed Football
- Co-ed Golf
- Co-ed Winter Track
- Co-ed Fall Cheerleading
- Co-ed Winter Cheerleading

The boys' spring / outdoor track team won the Group III state championship in 1925-1928, and won in Group IV in 1969.

The boys' cross country team won the Group IV state championship in 1964 and 1965.

The boys' wrestling team won the South Jersey Group IV state sectional title in 1988.

The girls' swimming team won the Public A state championship in 1996 and 2001–2005; the program's six state titles is tied for the sixth-most in the state and the five consecutive titles won from 2001 to 2005 is tied for the third-longest streak. The 2005 team became the first public school in the state to win five consecutive titles, after taking the Public A championship 105-65 in the finals against Westfield High School.

The boys' track team won the Group IV indoor relay championship in 2004 as co-champion with Christian Brothers Academy.

== Administration ==
The school's principals are Justin Adams (Tanner) and Rafael Maysonet (Asselta). Their administration team includes six assistant principals, with three for each building.

== Notable alumni ==
- John Armato (born 1948), politician who represented the 2nd Legislative District in the New Jersey General Assembly from 2018 to 2022
- Nicholas Asselta (born 1951), politician who represented the 1st Legislative District in the New Jersey Senate from 2004 to 2008
- Obie Bermúdez (born 1977, class of 1995), Latin Grammy winner for Best Male Pop Vocal Album in 2005
- Jack S. Brayboy (1921–1976, class of 1939), football player, coach, teacher, and university administrator, all at Johnson C. Smith University
- Glenn Carbonara (born 1966, class of 1983), retired soccer defender who spent his entire professional career in the American indoor leagues
- Jennifer S. Couture (class of 1991), U.S. naval officer serving in the rank of rear admiral as Director, Military Personnel Plans and Policy in the office of the Chief of Naval Operations
- Marvin Creamer (1916–2020; class of 1932), sailor notable for being the first recorded person to have sailed around the globe without the aid of navigational instruments
- Jamil Demby (born 1996), offensive tackle for the Los Angeles Rams of the NFL
- Dick Errickson (1912-1999), pitcher who played in MLB for the Boston Bees / Braves and the Chicago Cubs
- Darren Ford (born 1985), former MLB center fielder who played for the San Francisco Giants
- Lee Hull (born 1965, class of 1984), football coach and former player who was the head football coach at Morgan State University from 2014 to 2015
- Alan Kotok (1941-2006), computer scientist known for his work at Digital Equipment Corporation and at the World Wide Web Consortium
- Layle Lane (1893-1976), African American educator and civil rights activist
- Jillian Loyden (born 1985), soccer goalkeeper
- Ryan Ogren (born 2000), musician who has performed as part of Over It and Runner Runner
- Isiah Pacheco (born 2000, class of 2018), American football running back for the Detroit Lions. Super Bowl LVII champion
- Thelma Parkinson (1898-1983), politician, candidate for 1930 special election for the United States Senate, member of the New Jersey State Board of Tax Appeals, member (and later president) of the New Jersey Civil Service Commission 1954 to 1970
- John Pascarella (born 1966, class of 1984), soccer coach who serves as head coach of USL Championship club OKC Energy FC
- Lou Piccone (born 1949), former American football wide receiver and kick returner who played in the National Football League for the New York Jets and Buffalo Bills
- Tyreem Powell (born 2001), American football linebacker for the Rutgers Scarlet Knights
- Lucille Ramish (1928–1990, class of 1944), linguist and missionary with the Overseas Missionary Fellowship active in British Malaya
- Vic Voltaggio (born 1941, class of 1959), Major League Baseball umpire from 1977 to 1996

== Notable staff ==
- Gerald Luongo (born 1938), former principal, politician and convicted felon
