= Marvin Creamer =

American college professor and sailor (1916–2020)

Marvin Charles Creamer
- Born: January 24, 1916 near Vineland, New Jersey, U.S.
- Died: August 12, 2020 (aged 104); Raleigh, North Carolina, U.S.
- Occupations: College professor, sailor

Marvin Charles Creamer (January 24, 1916 – August 12, 2020) was an American college professor and sailor, notable for being the first recorded person to have sailed around the globe without the aid of navigational instruments. Between December, 21, 1982, and May 17, 1984, Creamer and the crew of his 36-foot boat, Globe Star, circumnavigated the globe without a compass, sextant, watch, or other instrument. The ship spent 511 days at sea. As general guides, Creamer observed the sun and stars, currents, and occasionally the regional biological setting. In honor of his voyage, Rowan University created the Marvin Creamer Scholarship Fund.

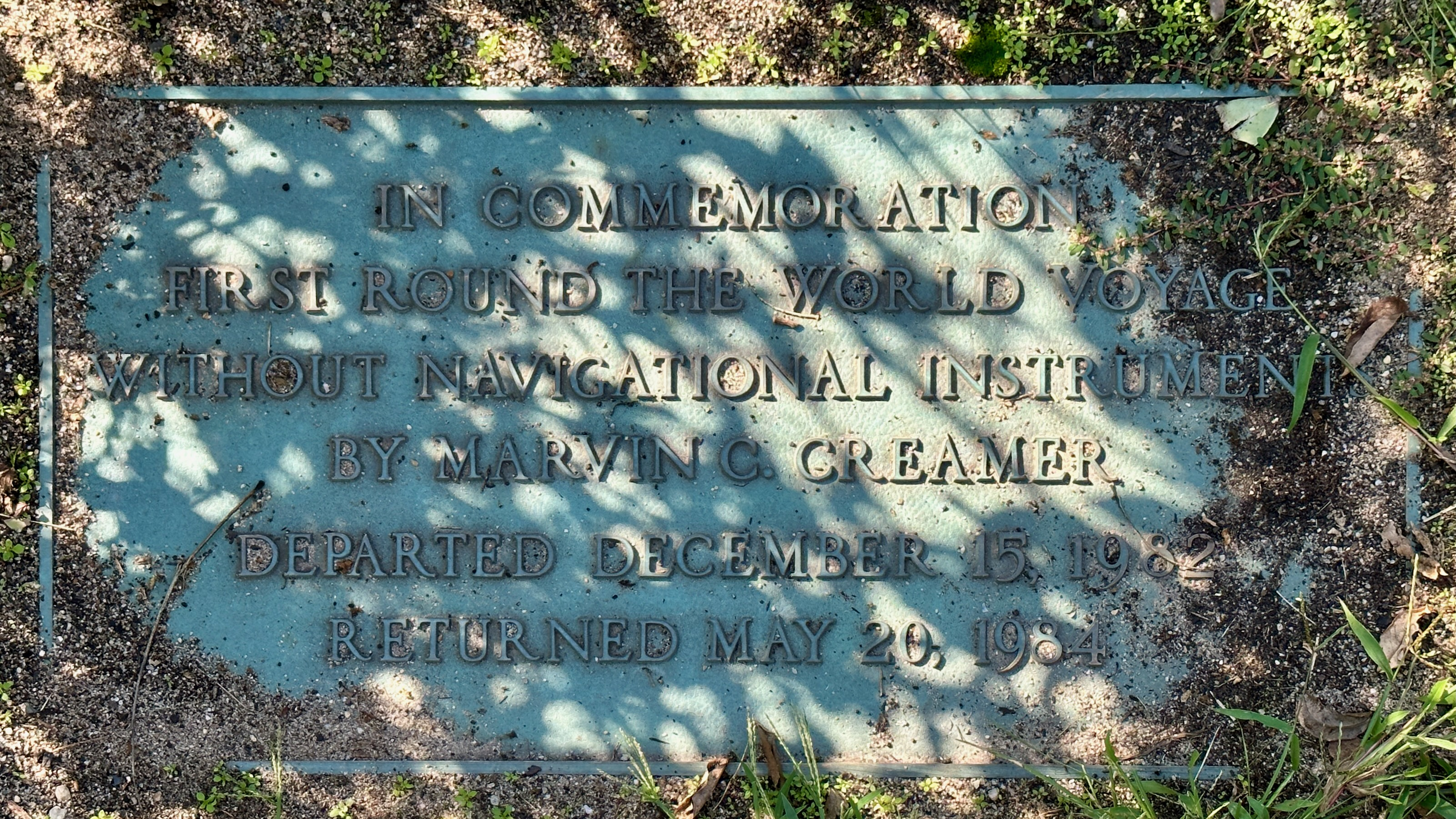
Plaque commemorating voyage in Red Bank Battlefield Park

== Personal life ==
Creamer was born near Vineland, New Jersey, about 50 miles south of Philadelphia, Pennsylvania. He attended Vineland High School, worked odd jobs directly after graduating, but did eventually enroll in college at New Jersey State Teachers College (later called Glassboro State College, and currently known as Rowan University), where he earned his degree in 1943. From 1948 to 1977 he taught geography at Glassboro State College. He had three children, six grandchildren, and two great-grandchildren. He was married to Blanche Creamer for 59 years until her death in 2005.

Creamer turned 100 in January 2016, and died on August 12, 2020, in Raleigh, North Carolina, aged 104.
