= Thelma Parkinson =

American politician (1898-1983)

President of the New Jersey Civil Service Commission
- In office 1959–1970
- Governor: Robert B. Meyner; Richard J. Hughes

Member of the New Jersey Civil Service Commission
- In office 1954–1959
- Governor: Robert B. Meyner

Member of the New Jersey State Board of Tax Appeals
- In office 1932–1945
- Governor: A. Harry Moore; Harold G. Hoffman; Charles Edison; Walter E. Edge

Personal details
- Born: Thelma A. Parkinson; May 1898 Vineland, New Jersey, U.S.
- Died: March 12, 1983 (aged 84) Vineland, New Jersey, U.S.
- Party: Democratic
- Spouse: William Howard Sharp (m. 1941; died 1958)
- Education: Smith College

Thelma Parkinson Sharp (née Parkinson; May 1898 – March 12, 1983) was an American politician and public official from New Jersey.

Parkinson held several positions in the New Jersey Democratic Party, and in 1930 became the first woman to be nominated for the United States Senate in New Jersey (and as of 2023, the only woman). Parkinson held positions in New Jersey's state government, including as President of the New Jersey Civil Service Commission, a cabinet position. Parkinson also served in national appointments to a White House Conference on Education, and the Advisory Committee on Women in the Armed Forces. In addition to being "the first woman to run for statewide office in New Jersey," Parkinson was also the first, and "longest-serving woman cabinet member in [New Jersey] state history."

== Early life and education ==
Thelma A. Parkinson was born in Vineland, New Jersey, to mother Ina Lauretta Parkinson (née Fenton) and father James C. Parkinson. Parkinson had one younger sister, Margarita, born circa 1900. Parkinson attended Vineland High School, graduating in 1915, and studied psychology and political economy at Smith College from 1916 to 1920.

After graduating, Parkinson taught English at Vineland High School. After only one year, she left teaching to become more involved in politics.

== Political career ==
In 1924, Parkinson was elected as a Democratic state committeewoman from Cumberland County. That same year, Parkinson acted as one of New Jersey's at-large delegate to the Democratic National Convention (a roll she would serve in every Convention until 1976).

In 1929, United States Senator from New Jersey Walter Edge resigned from his seat to take a position as U.S. Ambassador to France. In a special election in 1930, Parkinson became the Democratic nominee for the seat, facing Republican opponent Dwight Morrow. As women in the United States had only been granted suffrage ten years prior, Parkinson's nomination was part of an effort to attract women to vote for Democratic candidates. Murrow would ultimately win both the special election, and the concurrent election for a full term to New Jersey's other U.S. Senate seat.

During the 1952 Democratic National Convention, in which Adlai Stevenson became the party's nominee for president of the United States, Parkinson nominated India Edwards to be the nominee for vice president on the ticket.

In 1954, Parkinson was elected to succeed Mary Teresa Norton as a national Democratic committeewoman from New Jersey. Norton, whom Parkinson had met soon after becoming a state committeewoman, had been Parkinson's political mentor.

=== Appointments ===
Parkinson held a number of political appointments during her life. Starting in 1932, she was appointed by Governor A. Harry Moore to be a member of the New Jersey State Board of Tax Appeals. She would remain on the Board until 1945. In 1954, she was appointed by Robert Meyner to the New Jersey Civil Service Commission, later serving as the commission's president from 1959 to 1970. Parkinson's Civil Service Commission position made her the "longest-serving woman cabinet member in [New Jersey] state history."

Parkinson additionally held several national appointments, as well. In 1955, Parkinson was appointed as a delegate to the White House Conference on Education by President Dwight Eisenhower. President Lyndon Johnson appointed Parkinson to the Advisory Committee on Women in the Armed Forces, on which she served from 1964 to 1966.

== Personal life and death ==
Parkinson married W. Howard Sharp on June 28, 1941. A Court of Common Pleas judge, Sharp would go on to be elected to the New Jersey General Assembly in 1947, and to the New Jersey Senate in 1949. Sharp died on December 17, 1958.

Thelma Parkinson Sharp died on March 12, 1983.

The Thelma Parkinson Sharp papers are held at Rutgers University Archives and Special Collections.
