= John Pascarella =

American soccer coach

Personal information
- Date of birth: July 20, 1966 (age 60)
- Place of birth: New Jersey, United States
- Position: Goalkeeper

Team information
- Current team: Tampa Bay Rowdies (assistant coach)

College career
| Years | Team | Apps | (Gls) |
| 1984–1987 | Penn State Nittany Lions | | |

Senior career*
| Years | Team | Apps | (Gls) |
| 1988–1989 | Washington Stars | | |
| 1989–1990 | Sport Boys | | |
| 1991–1992 | Alianza Atlético | | |
| 1994 | Richmond Kickers | | |
| 1995 | Standard Falcons | | |
| 1996–1997 | Los Angeles Galaxy | | |

Managerial career
- 1998–2000: Maryland Terrapins (goalkeeping)
- 2001–2006: Herndon Hornets
- 2003–2008: U.S. Olympic Development Program
- 2007–2008: Northern Virginia Royals
- 2009–2010: Sporting Kansas City (goalkeeping & fitness)
- 2010–2017: Sporting Kansas City (assistant)
- 2017: Des Moines Menace
- 2017–2019: Minnesota United (goalkeeping)
- 2019–2021: OKC Energy
- 2022–2025: Forward Madison (assistant)
- 2022–2025: Tampa Bay Rowdies (assistant)
- * Club domestic league appearances and goals

John Pascarella (born July 20, 1966) is an American soccer coach who is currently on the staff of the Tampa Bay Rowdies in the USL Championship.

== Playing career ==
Raised in Vineland, New Jersey, Pascarella played prep soccer at Vineland High School together with Glenn Carbonara, with both graduating in 1984.

Pascarella played four years of college soccer at Pennsylvania State University between 1984 and 1987, before playing professional soccer. He had stints with Washington Stars and abroad in Peru with both Sport Boys and Alianza Atlético, before returning to the United States. In the US, Pascarella played in the A-League and USISL Premier League with Richmond Kickers and Standard Falcons, before joining MLS side Los Angeles Galaxy in 1996.

== Management career ==
Pascarella's coaching career began at the University of Maryland in 1998. He later was head coach at Herndon High School, the U.S. Olympic Development Program in Virginia and with USL PDL side Northern Virginia Royals. He joined Peter Vermes at Kansas City Wizards in MLS as goalkeeping coach in 2009, before becoming an assistant coach.

In 2017, he was named head coach at PDL side Des Moines Menace, getting the team to the Conference Finals.

On December 21, 2017, Pascarella was appointed goalkeeping coach with Minnesota United ahead of their inaugural season in MLS.

On November 22, 2019, Pascarella was named head coach of USL Championship side OKC Energy, his first fully professional head coaching position.

On June 4, 2021, following a winless start to the 2021 USL Championship season, Pascarella and the OKC Energy mutually agreed to part ways.

Pascarella joined Forward Madison FC's staff on January 7, 2022.

On August 22, 2025, Pascarella joined the Tampa Bay Rowdies as an assistant coach, under head coach Dominic Casciato.
