= Cumberland County College =

Community college in Vineland, New Jersey

Coordinates: 39.441°N 75.057°W

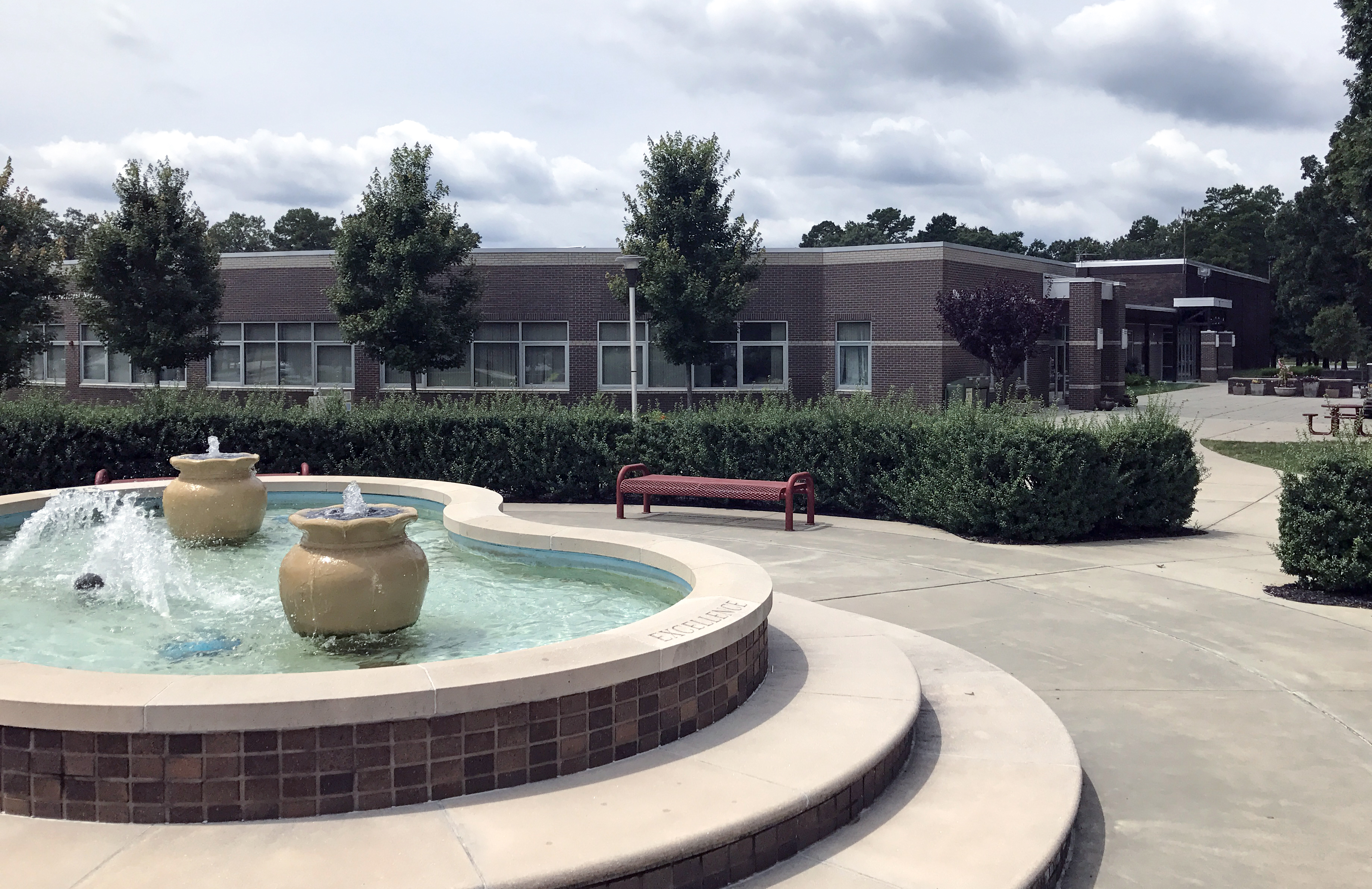
- Student Center, Cumberland Campus
- Type: Public community college
- Active: 1966–July 1, 2019 (merged with Rowan College)
- Academic affiliations: Sea-grant
- Location: Vineland, New Jersey, United States
- Colors
- Mascot: Duke
- Website: cccnj.edu at the Wayback Machine (archive index)

Cumberland County College was a public community college in Vineland and Millville in Cumberland County, New Jersey. It became the Cumberland Campus of Rowan College of South Jersey (RCSJ–Cumberland) on July 1, 2019, as part of a merger with Rowan College at Gloucester County. The historic merger is the first of its kind in New Jersey.

== History ==
Founded in 1966, Cumberland County College was the first community college in the state to open its own campus. The State of New Jersey, in 1962, passed the New Jersey County College Act, after which the Cumberland County Board of Chosen Freeholders authorized the founding of a community college. A groundbreaking ceremony took place on December 10, 1965. The original campus, which cost $2.7 million to construct, consisted of three buildings. Today, the 90-acre RCSJ Cumberland Campus consists of 12 buildings, including: Phillip Alampi Science Center, Frank Guaracini Jr. Fine and Performing Arts Center, George P. Luciano Family Center for Public Service and Leadership, Shirlee and Bernard Brown University Center, and Paul Navone Healthcare Education Center. On October 17, 1966, the college opened its doors to offer nine associate degree programs to approximately 350 enrolled students. The college's first class of graduates, in 1968, numbered 151. The Class of 2017, the largest in Cumberland County College's history, numbered 758.

== University Center ==
In May 2006, Bernard Brown and his wife Shirlee donated $1 million to establish an endowment to assist with the operating costs of a facility that would enable students to earn a bachelor's or master's degree on Cumberland County College's campus. The $6 million Shirlee and Bernard Brown University Center opened in February 2008. The modern 17,423-square-foot facility features 12 classrooms, study areas and offices. The University Center marked its 10th anniversary in 2018 by hosting an inaugural Distinguished Alumni Induction ceremony.

== Satellite locations ==
Rowan College of South Jersey maintains two additional education and training facilities in Cumberland County. The Paula J. Ring Education Center in Millville, which opened in 2013, houses the Workforce and Community Education division; and 2017 saw the opening of the Arts and Innovation Center in Millville, containing the Clay College studio and gallery, educational and training classrooms, and entrepreneurial space.

== Notable alumni ==
- Nicholas Asselta (born 1951), politician who served in the New Jersey State Senate from 2004 to 2008, where he represented the 1st Legislative District.
- R. Bruce Land (born 1950), politician and former corrections officer who has represented the 1st Legislative District in the New Jersey General Assembly since 2016
- Soraida Martinez (born 1956), artist, designer and social activist known for creating the art style of Verdadism.

== See also ==
- New Jersey County Colleges
