= Layle Lane =

American educator and civil rights activist

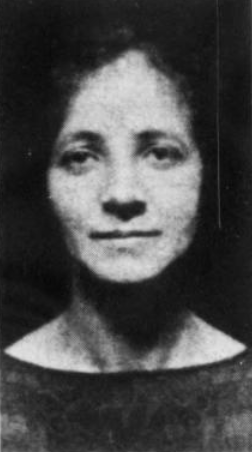
- Layle Lane, from a 1926 publication
- Born: November 27, 1893; Marietta, Georgia, US
- Died: February 2, 1976 (aged 82); Cuernavaca, Mexico
- Occupations: Teacher, civil rights activist, politician, labor leader

Layle Lane (November 27, 1893 – February 2, 1976) was an American educator and civil rights activist.

== Life ==
Lane was born in Marietta, Georgia in 1893 to Reverend Calvin Lane and Alice Virginia Clark Lane. She was their fourth child. Her father was a Congregationalist minister and her mother was a teacher. Her family left Georgia after her father was threatened to be lynched. The family resettled in Knoxville, Tennessee, and three years later in Vineland, New Jersey. In Vineland, Lane attended Vineland High School, where she was the first black graduate of the school. Lane never married. In 1976, she died in Cuernavaca, Mexico.

== Education ==
Lane graduated from Howard University in 1916. After being unable to receive a job as a teacher in a New York public school, she returned to school earning a second undergraduate degree at Hunter College. She received her master's degree from Columbia University.

== Career and activism ==
Lane became a high school teacher, teaching social studies in a New York high school. Lane was heavily involved in activism throughout her life, and participated in many protests for African American rights and workers' rights. She became an early member of the Teachers Union, and later the Teachers Guild. She served on the executive board of the Teacher's Guild.

Lane was elected the first black female American Federation of Teachers vice president. She ran five times as a candidate in the Socialist Party for public office. Three of those times were for Congress. Lane served on the National Committee for Rural Schools. She helped to plan and organize the March on Washington for Jobs and Freedom in 1941. Lane ran a summer camp on her Pennsylvania farm for impoverished black children from the inner-city.
