= Tyreem Powell =

American football player (born 2001)

Profile
- Position: Linebacker

Personal information
- Born: December 28, 2001 (age 24); Vineland, New Jersey, U.S.
- Listed height: 6 ft 4 in (1.93 m)
- Listed weight: 239 lb (108 kg)

Career information
- High school: Vineland (NJ)
- College: Rutgers (2020–2024)
- NFL draft: 2025: undrafted

Career history
- New Orleans Saints (2025)*
- * Offseason or practice squad member only
- Stats at Pro Football Reference

Tyreem Powell (born December 28, 2001) is an American professional football linebacker. He played college football for the Rutgers Scarlet Knights.

== Early life ==
Raised in Vineland, New Jersey, Powell attended Vineland High School. He was rated as a three-star recruit and held offers from Penn State, Rutgers, Temple, and Virginia Tech. Initially, Powell committed to play college football for the Virginia Tech Hokies. However, he flipped his commitment to play for the Rutgers Scarlet Knights.

== College career ==
As a freshman in 2020, Powell did not appear in any games. In 2021, he appeared in 13 games and made three starts, notching 20 tackles, an interception, and a fumble recovery. In 2022, Powell started all 12 games and recorded 71 tackles, with six going for a loss, and three sacks. In 2023, he played in just eight games due to injury, where he notched 53 tackles, three sacks, two pass deflections, and a forced fumble for the Scarlet Knights. In week three of the 2024 season, Powell made his season debut after tearing his Achilles tendon in the offseason, where he notched three tackles with one being for a loss, as he helped Rutgers to a win over Virginia Tech. In week ten, Powell tallied eight tackles and a forced fumble in a win over Minnesota.

== Professional career ==
Pre-draft measurables
Height	Weight	Arm length	Hand span	40-yard dash	10-yard split	20-yard split	20-yard shuttle
6 ft 4 1/2 in (1.94 m)	239 lb (108 kg)	34 5/8 in (0.88 m)	9 in (0.23 m)	4.69 s	1.57 s	2.75 s	4.58 s
All values from NFL Combine/Pro Day

Following the 2025 NFL draft, Powell signed with the New Orleans Saints as an undrafted free agent on April 27, 2025. He was waived on August 25.
