= Soraida Martinez =

American artist

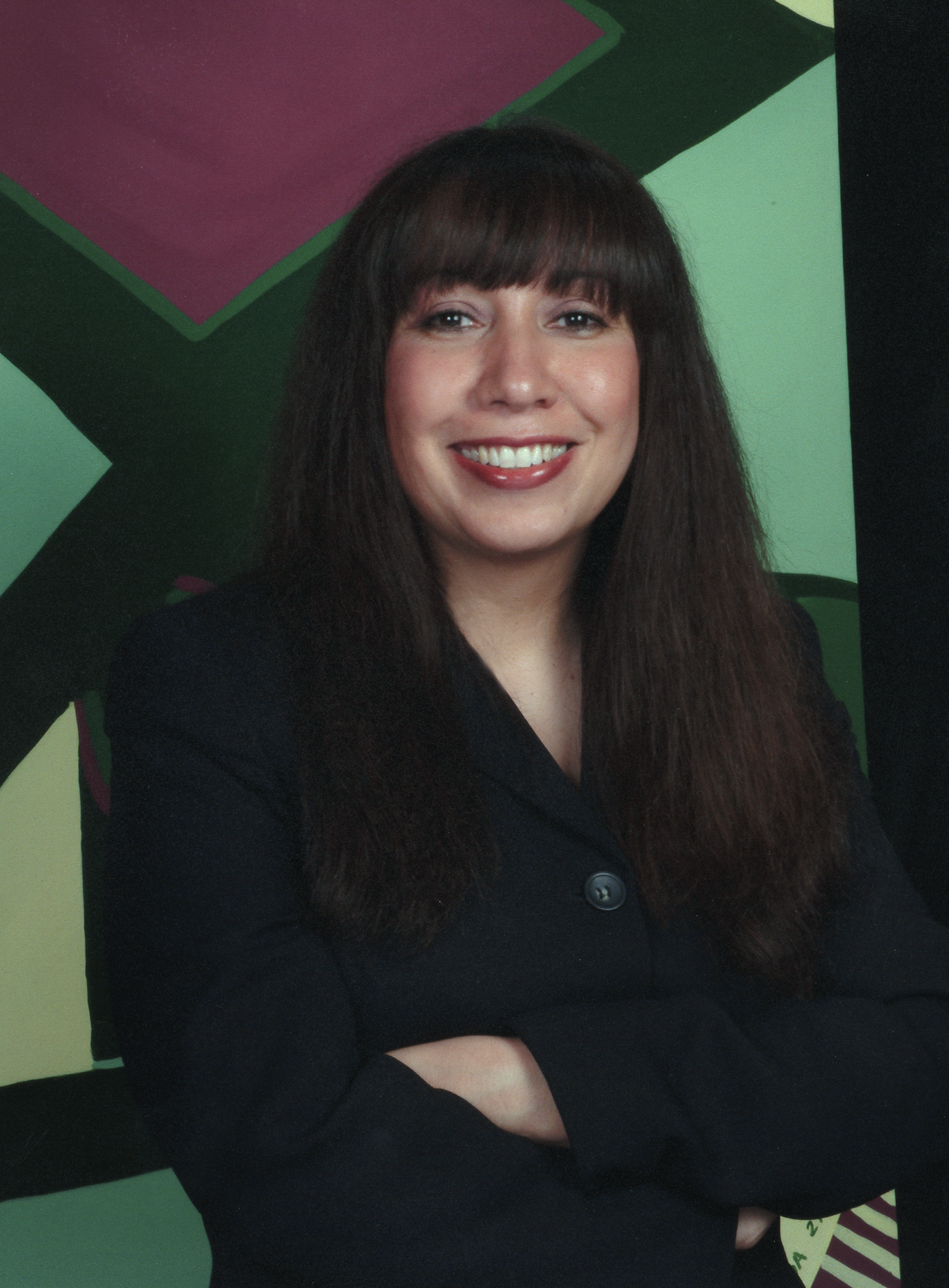
- Born: July 30, 1956 (age 69); Harlem, New York City, U.S.
- Education: Cumberland County College; Glassboro State College (now Rowan University)
- Known for: Painting, Verdadism, social commentary
- Notable work: Soraida's Verdadism: The Intellectual Voice of a Puerto Rican Woman on Canvas
- Style: Abstract expressionism, hard-edge abstraction
- Movement: Verdadism
- Website: soraida.com

Soraida Martinez (born July 30, 1956 in Harlem, New York) is an American visual artist of Puerto Rican descent known for her contemporary abstract expressionist paintings and social commentary. She is the creator of the art movement, Verdadism.

== Early life and education ==
Martinez was born in New York in 1956 and has Puerto Rican heritage. Martinez started painting at age eight.

After moving to Vineland, New Jersey at the age of 14, Martinez studied art at Glassboro State College, where she graduated in 1981 with a Bachelor of Fine Arts with a specialization in design; she also has a Liberal Arts degree focusing on psychology from Cumberland County College, Vineland, New Jersey in 1978.

== Career and art ==
Martinez has been the owner of an art and design studio since 1986. Her art is very abstract and hard-edged. Every painting is accompanied by writing, usually in the form of social commentary and often based on her personal experiences. Her paintings have been called "audacious."

Martinez's outspoken social commentary is also well known. She has been noted as a person who raises awareness of topics that are considered "too taboo to be discussed in mainstream American society."

=== Verdadism ===
Since 1992 Soraida Martinez has been known as the creator of Verdadism, a form of hard-edge abstraction where each painting is accompanied by a written social commentary. Verdadism is a neologism created by combining the Spanish word, verdad (truth) and the English suffix for theory (ism). Verdadism has influenced a number of contemporary artists and writers and is used by educators to help teach concepts such as diversity and cultural understanding.

Martinez's art is intended to connect "two distinct, yet integral parts: the visual and the written word." Viewers are drawn to both the artist's abstract paintings and her commentaries on humanity and the universal human condition. According to Martinez' artist's statement, "My art reflects the essence of my true self and the truth within me...My struggle is for recognition, acceptance and inclusion; and, against racism, sexism and the dominant eurocentric male society, which never expected much from me but still did not allow my voice to be heard. My belief is that one must empower oneself with one's own truth...".

Martinez has gained recognition and received many awards for this unique thought-provoking and visually stimulating art style. Among many other social and philosophical issues, Soraida’s Verdadism paintings also address sexism, racism and stereotyping for the purpose of promoting hope, peace, tolerance and social change. In 1999, Martinez wrote a book on the Art of Verdadism called Soraida's Verdadism: The Intellectual Voice of a Puerto Rican Woman on Canvas; Unique, Controversial Images and Style.

The Verdadism art style has been featured in many magazines and newspapers, as well as on radio and television; many of the Verdadism paintings have been used as covers for books and scholarly journals. Educational organizations and elementary school teachers also use the artist's paintings and art book to teach students about tolerance and diversity. The Verdadism Art Book is also being used as a textbook for a visual rhetoric course at Willamette University.

=== Awards and recognition ===
In 1996, Martinez was appointed by the governor of New Jersey, Christine Todd Whitman, to a seat on the New Jersey State Council on the Arts, where she was a member until she resigned in 2000.

In 2008, Martinez was recognized (along with other notable actors, artists, designers, directors and writers) as one of the 15 most prominent Hispanic Americans in the Arts. In 2013, Martinez was singled out by the Huffington Post as one of the ten best Latino artists in the U.S.

Through her art, Martinez is an advocate and humanitarian who visits young children in schools in order to encourage and inspire them to strive to achieve their fullest potential. Martinez is frequently asked to do exhibitions on her Verdadism art and philosophy at universities, institutions and corporations.

== Quotes ==
"In this society, we have been conditioned to be what people want us to be. We--as individuals--are afraid to be individuals. That's because American society...is actually not so open-minded when it comes to new ideas or different races. And, as human beings, we all know that; therefore, many of us have the terror of demasking ourselves. Most of us would rather die than let someone really know us."

"Art can plant a seed in someone's mind."

"I tell... kids about empowering themselves through education. And they see me as a role model. A professional artist. A Puerto Rican woman. I made it. But I wish someone had told me what I'm telling them."

== Sources ==
- Encyclopedia Latina: History, Culture, and Society in the United States by Ilan Stavans, Harold Augenbra - Published Grolier Academic Reference. ISBN 0-7172-5815-7
- Social Work with Latinos: A Cultural Assets Paradigm by Melvin Delgado - Published 2006 Oxford University Press. ISBN 0-19-530118-8
- Adiós, Borinquen Querida: La diáspora puertorriqueña, su historia y sus aportaciones ("ADIOS, BORINQUEN QUERIDA": THE PUERTO RICAN DIASPORA, ITS HISTORY, AND CONTRIBUTIONS”) by Edna Acosta-Belén - Published 2000 CELAC. ISBN 0-615-11204-8
