= Landis Township, New Jersey =

Coordinates: 39.3746°N 74.9638°W

Historical population
Census	Pop.	Note	%±
1870	7,079		—
1880	3,486		−50.8%
1890	3,855		10.6%
1900	4,721		22.5%
1910	6,435		36.3%
1920	10,402		61.6%
1930	14,047		35.0%
1940	16,525		17.6%
1950	21,418		29.6%
Population sources:1870-1920 1870 1880-1890; 1890-1910 1910-1930 1930-1950

LANDIS TOWNSHIP, TRAINING SCHOOL FOR BACKWARD AND FEEBLE-MINDED CHILDREN.

Landis Township was a township that existed in Cumberland County, New Jersey, United States from 1864 to 1952. It was named after Charles K. Landis, the founder of Vineland.

Landis Township was incorporated as a township by an Act of the New Jersey Legislature on March 7, 1864, from portions of Millville, based on the results of a referendum held on March 22, 1864. Portions of the township were taken to form Vineland Borough (May 28, 1880). Other transfers of territory were made to Maurice River Township (1873), to Franklin Township (Gloucester County) (1892, returned in 1897) and from Millville (1934).

Landis Township lasted until July 1, 1952, when it was combined with Vineland Borough to form Vineland City, based on the results of a referendum held on February 5, 1952.
