= Vineland Public Schools =

School district in Cumberland County, New Jersey, US

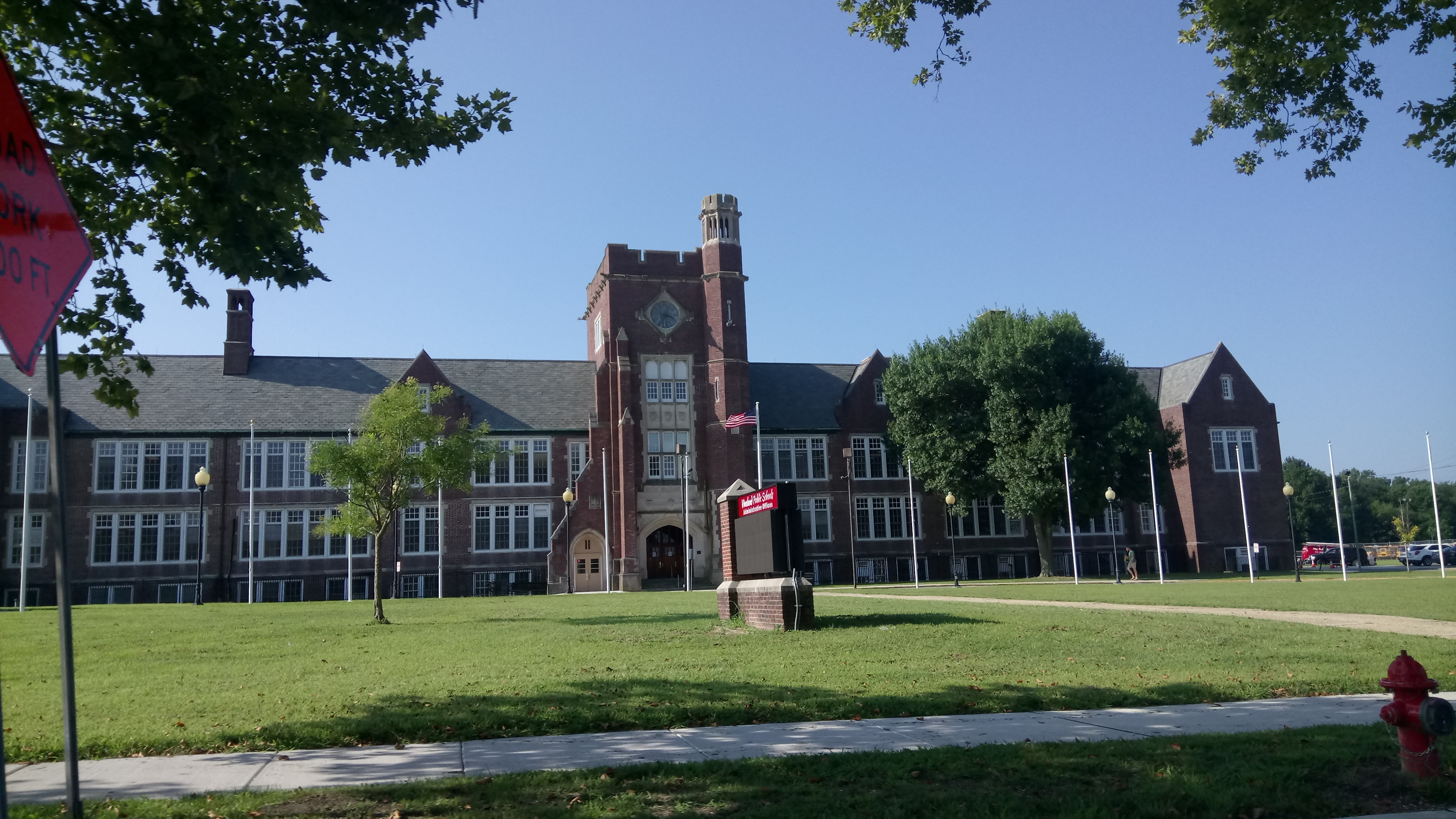
- Board of Education Office

Address
- 61 West Landis Avenue Vineland, Cumberland County, New Jersey, 08360; United States
- Coordinates: 39.487959°N 75.022592°W

District information
- Grades: pre-K to 12
- Superintendent: Alfonso Llano
- Business administrator: Scott A. Musterel
- Schools: 14
- Affiliation: Former Abbott district

Students and staff
- Enrollment: 10,317 (as of 2023–24)
- Faculty: 746.73 FTEs
- Student–teacher ratio: 13.82:1

Other information
- District Factor Group: A
- Website: www.vineland.org
| Ind. | Per pupil | District spending | Rank (*) | K-12 average | %± vs. average |
|---|---|---|---|---|---|
| 1A | Total Spending | $19,783 | 71 | $18,891 | 4.7% |
| 1 | Budgetary Cost | 16,143 | 81 | 14,783 | 9.2% |
| 2 | Classroom Instruction | 9,615 | 83 | 8,763 | 9.7% |
| 6 | Support Services | 2,702 | 81 | 2,392 | 13.0% |
| 8 | Administrative Cost | 1,545 | 69 | 1,485 | 4.0% |
| 10 | Operations & Maintenance | 1,930 | 79 | 1,783 | 8.2% |
| 13 | Extracurricular Activities | 166 | 18 | 268 | −38.1% |
| 16 | Median Teacher Salary | 59,738 | 28 | 64,043 |
Data from NJDoE 2014 Taxpayers' Guide to Education Spending. *Of K-12 districts with more than 3,500 students. Lowest spending=1; Highest=103

Vineland Public Schools is a comprehensive community public school district that serves students in pre-kindergarten through twelfth grade from Vineland, in Cumberland County, in the U.S. state of New Jersey. The district is one of 31 former Abbott districts statewide that were established pursuant to the decision by the New Jersey Supreme Court in Abbott v. Burke which are now referred to as "SDA Districts" based on the requirement for the state to cover all costs for school building and renovation projects in these districts under the supervision of the New Jersey Schools Development Authority.

As of the 2020–21 school year, the district, comprised of 14 schools, had an enrollment of 10,266 students and 731.9 classroom teachers (on an FTE basis), for a student–teacher ratio of 14.0:1.

The district is classified by the New Jersey Department of Education as being in District Factor Group "A", the lowest of eight groupings. District Factor Groups organize districts statewide to allow comparison by common socioeconomic characteristics of the local districts. From lowest socioeconomic status to highest, the categories are A, B, CD, DE, FG, GH, I, and J.

== Awards and recognition ==
Cunningham Elementary School was recognized by Governor Jim McGreevey in 2003 as one of 25 schools selected statewide for the First Annual Governor's School of Excellence award.

== Schools ==
Schools in the district (with 2023–24 enrollment data from the National Center for Education Statistics) are:

Preschool

- Casimer M. Dallago Jr. Preschool Center / IMPACT (335 students; in PreK)

Elementary schools

- Dane Barse Elementary School (234; K–5)
- Solve D'Ippolito Elementary School (505; K–5)
- Marie Durand School (508; K–5)
- William Mennies Elementary School (563; K–5)
- Pauline J. Petway Elementary School (494; K–5)
- Anthony Rossi Elementary School (614; K–5)
- Gloria M. Sabater Elementary School (668; K–5)
- John H. Winslow Elementary School (483; K–5)

Middle schools

- Sgt. Dominick Pilla Middle School (665; 6–8)
- Veterans Memorial Middle School (613; 6–8)
- Thomas W. Wallace Jr. Middle School (734; 6–8)
- Edward Johnstone School (296; 6–8)

High schools

- Cunningham Academy for students with "personal or academic challenges that prevent them from reaching their full potential" (NA; 7–12)
- Vineland High School (2,799; 9–12)

== Administration ==
Core members of the district's administration are:

- Alfonso Llano, superintendent
- Scott A. Musterel, business administrator and board secretary

== Board of education ==
The district's board of education, comprised of nine members, sets policy and oversees the fiscal and educational operation of the district through its administration. As a Type II school district, the board's trustees are elected directly by voters to serve three-year terms of office on a staggered basis, with three seats up for election each year held (since 2012) as part of the November general election. The board appoints a superintendent to oversee the district's day-to-day operations and a business administrator to supervise the business functions of the district.
