= Lucille Ramish =

American linguist and missionary

Lucille Ramish

Lucille Mabel Ramish (11 June 1928 – 27 November 1990) was an American linguist and missionary with the Overseas Missionary Fellowship active in British Malaya.

== Early life and education ==
Ramish was born on 11 June 1928 in Richmond, Virginia to Charles Ramish. She had a sister. She studied at the Vineland High School and began attending the Gordon College of Theology and Missions in Boston in 1948. At college, she was an honor student and a member of the Greek Club and of Phi Beta Theta. She graduated from Brown University with degrees in arts and religious education.

== Career ==
Having learnt Mandarin, Ramish left for Singapore in January 1954. She joined the China Inland Mission in March and was sent to the town of Skudai in Johor. There, she and her fellow missionaries held weekly Evangelistic meetings. They also organised classes for teenage girls on Saturday evenings and Sunday school for children. However, they reportedly had little success. Ramish had been sent to the town of Chaah, also within Johor, by early 1956. The missionaries there reportedly had greater success with converting the locals.

In 1957, Ramish became an instructor of English at the Chinese-language Nanyang University in Singapore. As religious work was not allowed on campus, she held religious meetings for Christian students at her apartment. This led to the formation of the Nanyang University Christian Fellowship. She remained at the university for seven years before she made the decision to return to Brown University in 1964 to study applied linguistics. Ramish returned to Singapore with a PhD in linguistics in 1970 and resumed her position at the Nanyang University. She also worked with the Language Centre of the China Inland Mission, which had by then been renamed the Overseas Missionary Fellowship. In May 1974, Ramish was appointed the acting director of the university's Language Centre. By April 1976, she had been made the centre's director.

In October 1977, Ramish established the Evangel Baptist Church with June Lane, a friend of hers. Ramish left the Overseas Missionary Fellowship in 1977 to "protect her freedom to witness on and off the campus of Nanyang University in Singapore". However, she returned to the organisation in 1980. In 1988, she was named Alumni of the Year by the Gordon College.

== Personal life and death ==
Ramish was a member of the Covenant Orthodox Presbyterian Church. She considered Mandarin a difficult language to learn. She first met June Lane, the wife of Overseas Missionary Fellowship director Denis Lane, in 1970. Lane assisted her in the various religious meetings that she held. In the 1980s, Ramish was diagnosed with ovarian cancer. She returned to Boston in 1990 and was accompanied by Lane. She died at the New England Baptist Hospital in Boston on 27 November of that year. She was buried at the Vernon Grove Cemetery in Milford, Massachusetts.
