= Jennifer S. Couture =

American Navy rear admiral

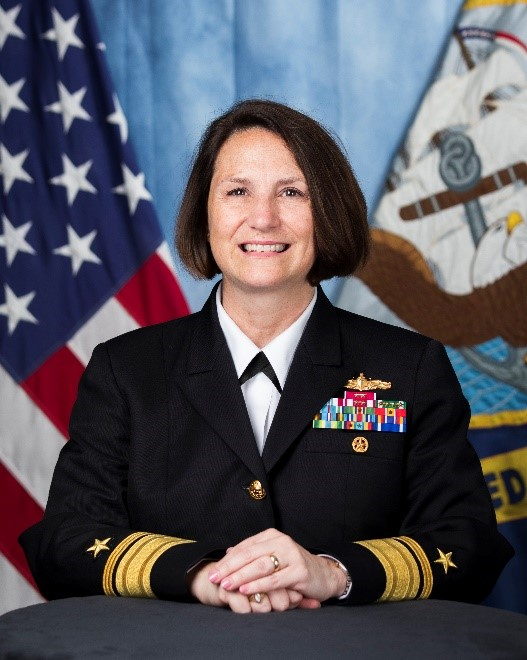
- Rear Admiral Couture in 2024
- Education: George Washington University (BA); Old Dominion University (MA); Northeastern University (EdD)
- Military career
- Allegiance: United States
- Branch: United States Navy
- Service years: 1995 – present
- Rank: Rear Admiral
- Commands: Naval Service Training Command; Carrier Strike Group 11; Destroyer Squadron 28; USS Kauffman (FFG-59)
- Conflicts: Operation Joint Endeavour; Operation Active Endeavour; War in Afghanistan; Iraq war Operation Inherent Resolve
- Awards: Legion of Merit (3)

Jennifer Scot Couture (née Dunn) is an American naval officer, currently serving in the rank of rear admiral as Director, Military Personnel Plans and Policy (N13) in the office of the Chief of Naval Operations. She previously served as Commander, Naval Service Training, responsible for all enlisted recruits and the United States Navy's ROTC programs.

At sea, she commanded Carrier Strike Group 11 from 2023 to 2024.

== Early life and education ==
Couture, a native of Vineland, New Jersey, graduated from Vineland High School in 1991. She studied International Relations at George Washington University and commissioned into the Navy through Naval ROTC in 1995.

She later earned a Master of Arts degree in International Studies from Old Dominion University and eventually earned a Doctor of Education from Northeastern University in Organizational Leadership Studies in 2025 for her dissertation "Taking a Fix: An Action Research Study Exploring Ethical Leadership and Culture Development in the United States Navy".

She is also a graduate of the Joint Professional Military Education programs at the U.S. Naval War College and the Joint Forces Staff College.

== Career ==
During her career, Couture served as a surface warfare officer aboard multiple classes of ships before assuming command of USS Kauffman in February 2013. Couture served as the ship's penultimate commanding officer before its decommissioning. She relinquished command on 2 September 2014 and transitioned into a staff role on Naval Surface Forces Atlantic.

Serving as commodore of Destroyer Squadron 28, Couture led the unit of six Arleigh Burke-class destroyers from 2018 to 2020, participating in multiple exercises and deploying to the Arctic Circle.

In February 2021, while serving as assistant chief of staff, Naval Surface Forces Atlantic, Couture was nominated for promotion to rear admiral (lower half) by President Biden. After her confirmation, she started her initial flag officer assignment, serving as Commander, Naval Service Training Command from May 2021 to May 2023, when she reported to Carrier Strike Group 11 as the future commander.

In June 2023, Couture assumed command of the strike group aboard USS Nimitz while underway on deployment. Under Couture's command, the group concluded its 7 month long deployment, making port in San Diego before the Nimitz sailed towards her homeport in Bremerton, Washington.

During that time, she was promoted to rear admiral after being nominated for said promotion in February 2024.

After leading the unit through a period of maintenance and preparations, Couture relinquished command of the strike group in May 2024 and later started her current assignment as Director, Military Personnel Plans and Policy.
