= Isiah Pacheco =

Puerto Rican American football player (born 1999)

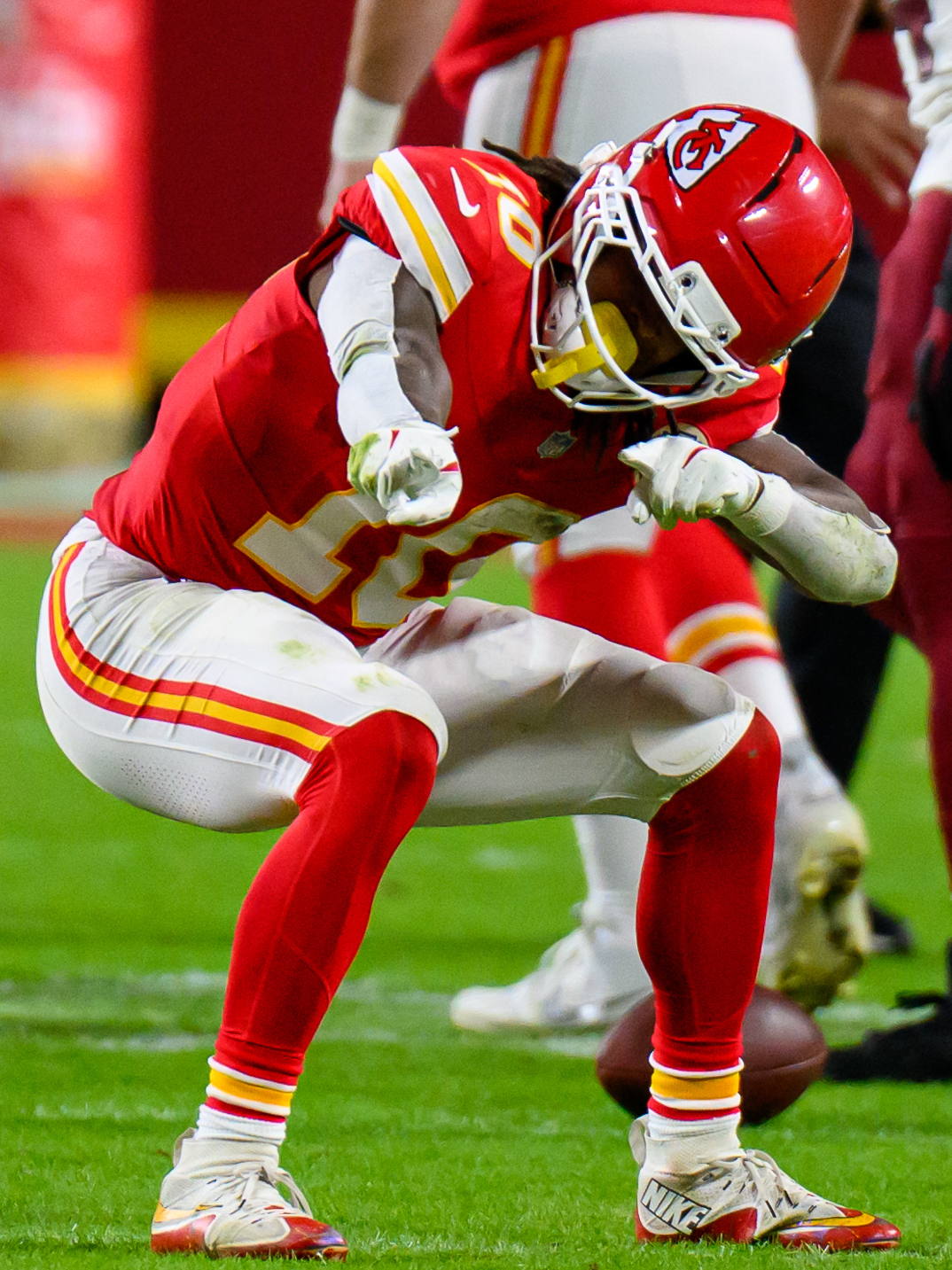
- Pacheco with the Kansas City Chiefs in 2025

No. 10 – Detroit Lions
- Position: Running back
- Roster status: Injured reserve

Personal information
- Born: March 2, 1999 (age 27); Vineland, New Jersey, U.S.
- Listed height: 5 ft 10 in (1.78 m)
- Listed weight: 216 lb (98 kg)

Career information
- High school: Vineland
- College: Rutgers (2018–2021)
- NFL draft: 2022: 7th round, 251st overall pick

Career history
- Kansas City Chiefs (2022–2025); Detroit Lions (2026–present)

Awards and highlights
- 2× Super Bowl champion (LVII, LVIII)

Career NFL statistics as of 2025
- Rushing yards: 2,537
- Rushing average: 4.4
- Rushing touchdowns: 14
- Receptions: 88
- Receiving yards: 554
- Receiving touchdowns: 3
- Stats at Pro Football Reference

Isiah Pacheco (born March 2, 1999), nicknamed "Pop", is an American professional football running back for the Detroit Lions of the National Football League (NFL). He played college football for the Rutgers Scarlet Knights and was selected by the Kansas City Chiefs in the seventh round of the 2022 NFL draft. In his first two seasons with the Chiefs, Pacheco won Super Bowl LVII and Super Bowl LVIII.

== Early life ==
Pacheco was born in Vineland, New Jersey, to Felicia Cannon and Julio Pacheco. He is the youngest of five siblings, and of Puerto Rican descent on his father's side, and African-American descent on his mother's side. Pacheco played Pop Warner Football for the Vineland Blitz in Cumberland County, New Jersey, and attended Vineland High School, where he played both quarterback and running back. As a senior, Pacheco led the Fighting Clan with a dominating performance to win the Thanksgiving Day Classic against the rival Millville Senior High School.

== College career ==
Pacheco was heavily recruited by Syracuse, Maryland, Rutgers, Virginia Tech, and other football programs along the East Coast. He committed to Rutgers University on June 21, 2017.

On August 20, 2019, Pacheco had 20 carries for 156 yards and four touchdowns in a victory over Massachusetts. He saw consistent playing time in each of his four collegiate seasons, rushing 563 times for 2,442 yards (4.3 ypc) and scoring 18 touchdowns. He also caught 47 passes for 249 yards and one score.

Pacheco was selected to participate in the 2022 Hula Bowl, an all-star game known for showcasing small-school and under-the-radar NFL prospects. He later competed in the East–West Shrine Bowl, one of the premier college all-star games, helping to raise his profile before the 2022 NFL draft.

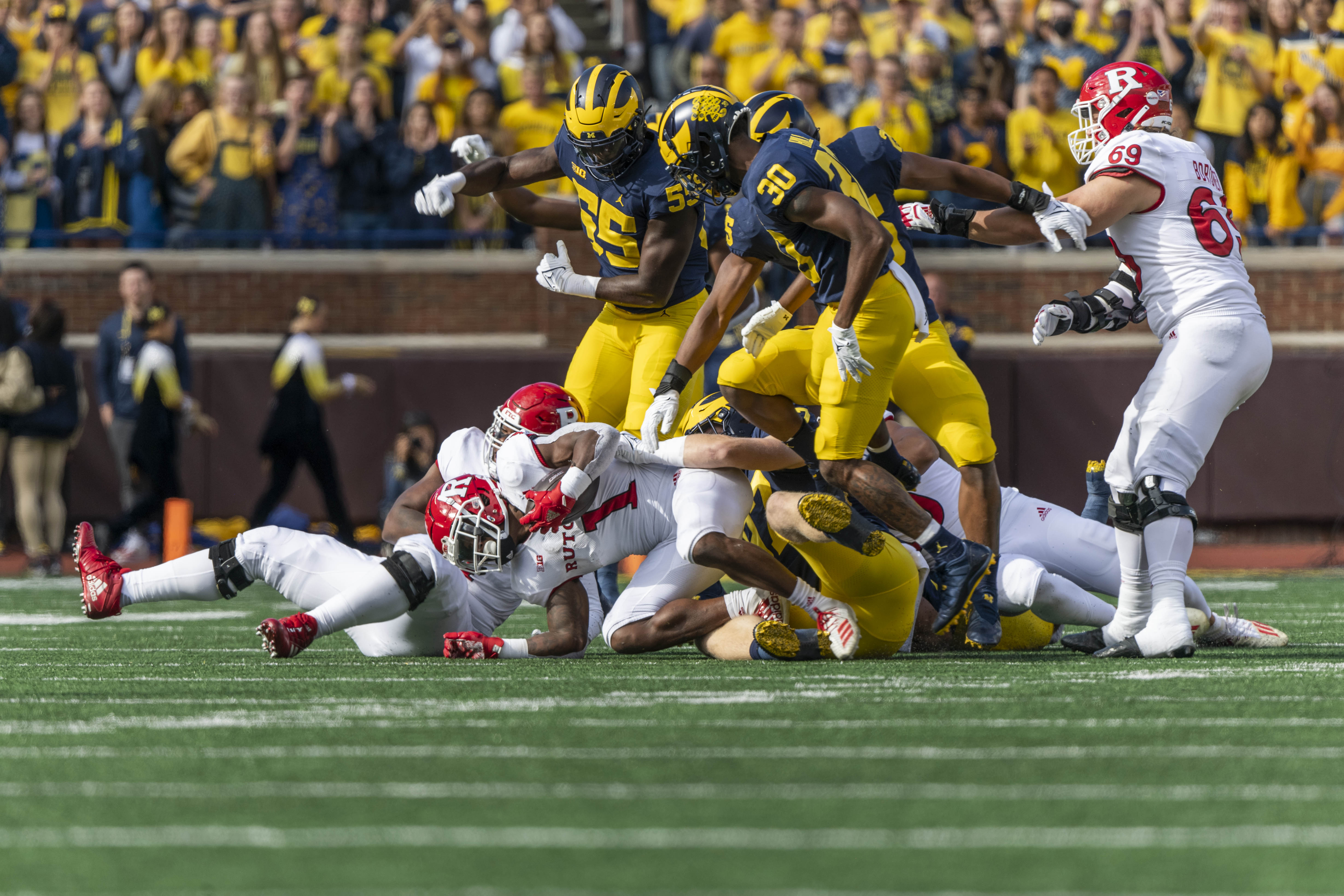
Pacheco (center, #1) with Rutgers against the Michigan Wolverines in 2021

== Professional career ==
Pre-draft measurables
Height	Weight	Arm length	Hand span	Wingspan	40-yard dash	10-yard split	20-yard split	20-yard shuttle	Three-cone drill	Vertical jump	Broad jump	Bench press
5 ft 10 3/8 in (1.79 m)	216 lb (98 kg)	30 1/2 in (0.77 m)	9 1/4 in (0.23 m)	6 ft 1 7/8 in (1.88 m)	4.37 s	1.49 s	2.53 s	4.27 s	7.09 s	33.0 in (0.84 m)	9 ft 10 in (3.00 m)	27 reps
All values from NFL Combine/Pro Day

=== Kansas City Chiefs ===
==== 2022 ====
Pacheco was selected in the seventh round (251st overall) of the 2022 NFL draft by the Kansas City Chiefs.

In his NFL debut during the season opener against the Arizona Cardinals, Pacheco scored his first career NFL rushing touchdown on a 3-yard run. He recorded his first career start in Week 7 against the San Francisco 49ers. During Week 11 against the Los Angeles Chargers, Pacheco rushed for a career-high 107 yards on 15 carries.

Pacheco finished the regular season with 830 rushing yards and 130 receiving yards (a total of 960 scrimmage yards), alongside five touchdowns on the ground. He also returned 29 kickoffs for 597 yards. Pacheco was the starting running back for the Chiefs in Super Bowl LVII. In the Super Bowl, Pacheco had 76 yards and a touchdown as the Chiefs defeated the Philadelphia Eagles 38–35. Following the season, Pacheco underwent surgeries to repair a torn labrum and broken hand, which he stated he had played through during the Super Bowl.

==== 2023 ====
During Week 4 against the Jets, Pacheco had 158 scrimmage yards and a rushing touchdown in the victory. In Week 12 against the Raiders, he had two rushing touchdowns in the victory. During Week 17 against the Bengals, he had 130 rushing yards and a receiving touchdown in the victory.

Pacheco appeared in 14 games and started 13 in the 2023 season. He finished with 205 carries for 935 yards and seven touchdowns to go with 44 receptions for 244 yards and two touchdowns. In each of the first three playoff games for the Chiefs, Pacheco scored a rushing touchdown. His second NFL season ended with the Chiefs winning Super Bowl LVIII against the San Francisco 49ers 25–22 with Pacheco rushing for 59 yards and recording six catches for 33 yards. The Chiefs became the first team to repeat as champions since the New England Patriots did it in 2003 and 2004. Pacheco made history being the only running back in NFL history to win two Super Bowls in his first two seasons.

==== 2024 ====
Pacheco returned as the Chiefs starting running back in 2024. He suffered a fractured fibula in Week 2 and was placed on injured reserve on September 18, 2024. He was activated on November 28, and played in the Week 13 matchup against the Las Vegas Raiders. He finished the 2024 season with 83 carries for 310 yards and a touchdown in seven games. He played in Super Bowl LIX, recording 12 scrimmage yards during the 40–22 loss to the Eagles.

==== 2025 ====
Pacheco finished the 2025 season with 118 carries for 462 yards and a touchdown to go with 19 receptions for 101 yards and a touchdown.

=== Detroit Lions ===
On March 12, 2026, Pacheco signed a one-year, $1.81 million contract with the Detroit Lions. He was placed on injured reserve on September 1 due to an MCL and back injury which required surgery.

== Career statistics ==
=== NFL ===
Legend
	Won the Super Bowl
	Led the league
**Bold**	Career high

==== Regular season ====
Year	Team	Games		Rushing					Receiving					Returning					Fumbles	
Year	Team	GP	GS	Att	Yds	Avg	Lng	TD	Rec	Yds	Avg	Lng	TD	Rt	Yds	Avg	Lng	TD	Fum	Lost
2022	KC	17	11	170	830	**4.9**	31	5	13	130	**10.0**	32	0	**29**	**597**	**20.6**	**48**	0	**4**	**2**
2023	KC	14	13	**205**	**935**	4.6	**48**	**7**	**44**	**244**	5.5	**33**	**2**	0	0	0.0	0	0	1	1
2024	KC	7	6	83	310	3.7	34	1	12	79	6.6	23	0	0	0	0.0	0	0	0	0
2025	KC	13	12	118	462	3.9	16	1	19	101	5.3	31	1	0	0	0.0	0	0	0	0
Career		51	42	576	2,537	4.4	48	14	88	554	6.3	33	3	29	597	20.6	48	0	5	3

==== Postseason ====
Year	Team	Games		Rushing					Receiving					Returning					Fumbles	
Year	Team	GP	GS	Att	Yds	Avg	Lng	TD	Rec	Yds	Avg	Lng	TD	Rt	Yds	Avg	Lng	TD	Fum	Lost
2022	KC	3	3	37	197	**5.3**	**39**	1	6	**65**	**10.8**	**18**	0	**2**	**45**	**22.5**	**23**	0	0	0
2023	KC	4	4	**81**	**313**	3.9	29	**3**	**12**	60	5.0	14	0	0	0	0.0	0	0	**2**	**1**
2024	KC	3	3	13	37	2.8	10	0	3	17	5.7	10	0	0	0	0.0	0	0	0	0
Career		10	10	131	547	4.2	39	4	21	142	6.8	18	0	2	45	22.5	23	0	2	1

=== College ===
Year	Team	G	Rushing				Receiving			
Year	Team	G	Att	Yds	Avg	TD	Rec	Yds	Avg	TD
2018	Rutgers	11	111	551	5.0	3	2	11	5.5	0
2019	Rutgers	11	169	729	4.3	7	13	83	6.4	0
2020	Rutgers	9	116	515	4.4	3	19	130	6.8	1
2021	Rutgers	12	167	647	3.9	5	13	25	1.9	0
Career		**43**	**563**	**2,442**	**4.3**	**18**	**47**	**249**	**5.3**	**1**

== Personal life ==
Pacheco has overcome tragedy as his brother Travoise Cannon was killed in January 2016 and his sister Celeste Cannon was murdered in September 2017. He has tattoos of his sister and brother in a mural on his right arm alongside other tattoos representing essential parts of his roots, including one representing New Jersey, Vineland High School and Rutgers University.
