= Jack S. Brayboy =

American football player, coach, teacher, and university administrator (1921–1976)

Jack Brayboy
- Brayboy in 1942

No. 29
- Positions: End, Kicker

Personal information
- Born: May 2, 1921; Vineland, New Jersey, U.S.
- Died: September 1, 1976 (aged 55); Charlotte, North Carolina, U.S.
- Listed height: 6 ft 1 in (1.85 m)
- Listed weight: 190 lb (86 kg)

Career information
- High school: Vineland (Vineland, New Jersey)
- College: Johnson C. Smith (1939–1942)

Career history
- Johnson C. Smith (1946–1948) Assistant coach; Johnson C. Smith (1949–1952) Head coach

Awards and highlights
- Football News Colored Player of the Year (1942); 3x Negro All-American (1940–1942); 4x All-CIAA (1939–1942)

Jack S. Brayboy (May 2, 1921 – September 1, 1976) was an American football player, coach, teacher, and university administrator, all at Johnson C. Smith University (JCSU) in Charlotte, North Carolina. Brayboy was a three time "Negro All-American" and was named as "Colored Player of the Year" by Football News following his 1942 senior season with the Johnson C. Smith Golden Bulls football team.

Brayboy was head coach of the Golden Bulls from 1950 to 1952. He later earned a PhD degree and worked in university administration as a vice-president at JCSU.

Brayboy is a 1976 inductee of the Central Intercollegiate Athletic Association (née Colored Intercollegiate Athletic Association) Hall of Fame and a 2015 member of the Vineland High School Hall of Fame. He is also the namesake of Jack S. Brayboy Gymnasium, home venue for volleyball and basketball at JCSU.

== Biography ==
=== Early life ===
Brayboy was born on May 2, 1921, in Vineland, New Jersey, and he attended Vineland High School in that city. Brayboy earned varsity letters in football, basketball, and track and field before graduating in 1939. He was instrumental in helping Vineland win New Jersey state football championships in 1937 and 1938.

=== College career ===
Brayboy attended Johnson C. Smith University (JCSU), a historically black school located in Charlotte, North Carolina.

Players played both ways in late 1930s and early 1940s. Brayboy was regarded as a stout defender.

Said to have possessed "glue-tipped fingers" as a receiver and an uncanny ability as a defender to stop opponents' running plays in their tracks, Brayboy was named to the Colored Intercollegiate Athletic Association for four successive years, beginning with his freshman season in 1939. He was also named an All-American following the 1940, 1941, and 1942 seasons.

Following his 1942 senior season, Brayboy was named "Colored Player of the Year" by Football News, which recognized him as the top player from a historically Black college according to the publication's evaluation. The publication ranked Julie Franks, an All-American Michigan lineman at University of Michigan, ahead of Brayboy among Black players at the time.

As an undergraduate Brayboy pursued a triple academic major at JCSU, studying chemistry, physical education, and mathematics. He graduated from the school in the spring of 1943.

=== Military service ===
With World War II raging, Brayboy enlisted in the United States Army Air Corps, forerunner of the United States Air Force after graduation from JCSU.

=== Coaching career ===
In 1946, with the world war at an end, Brayboy returned home to Charlotte, where he took a position as an instructor of health and physical education, working as well as an assistant coach to the Golden Bulls football team.

After a brief leave of absence to focus on studies, Brayboy was named head football coach of the Golden Bulls from in September 1949. In his inaugural season he led the team to a 3–4–1 record and a win in the Iodine Bowl. In four seasons as head coach he led the team to an overall record of 13–16–2 before he resigned after the 1952 season. His best year came in his last where he led the team to its best record since 1944.

=== Life after football ===
Brayboy married the former Jeanne Martin, a long-time friend of Martin Luther King, Jr. who held a master's degree from Boston University, in December 1954. The couple lived in Charlotte, where Jeanne first worked as an elementary school music teacher.

Brayboy returned to school to pursue an advanced degree. He earned a master's degree from the University of Pennsylvania in 1947 and a PhD degree from the same school in 1958 and became part of the faculty at Johnson C. Smith University. Moving to administration, Brayboy was named executive dean of JCSU in 1965, a position which he held until 1968, when he was selected as the school's vice-president of administrative affairs. He continued in the latter position until the time of his death.

He was active in community volunteer work, serving on the board of directors of Charlotte's United Community Service, the YMCA, on the executive board of the Boy Scouts of America, and other organizations. He was also a ruling elder of the Presbyterian Church and a member of Memorial United Presbyterian Church of Charlotte.

Brayboy was also a member of the Mecklenburg County Recreation Commission from 1968 to 1973 and past president of the local chapter of Phi Delta Kappa.

=== Death and legacy ===
Brayboy died of cancer on September 1, 1976. He was 55 years old at the time of his death. He was survived by his wife, Jeanne, his son Jack S. Brayboy III, and a daughter.

Brayboy is the namesake of Jack S. Brayboy Gymnasium, a 1,360-seat venue in Charlotte serving as the home for the JCSU volleyball and basketball teams.

In 1976 Brayboy was inducted into the Colored Intercollegiate Athletic Association Hall of Fame.

He was named a member of the Vineland High School Hall of Fame in 2015.

At the time of his death, his longtime friend and coworker, Eddie McGirt, head of the athletics department at JCSU, remembered Brayboy as an outstanding campus personality. "He never wanted to see anybody taken advantage of and was always sympathetic to people in need," McGirt told the Charlotte News. "He helped a lot of students and was always willing to listen to their problems."

== Head coaching record ==
Year	Team	Overall	Conference	Standing	Bowl/playoffs
Johnson C. Smith Golden Bulls (Colored / Central Intercollegiate Athletic Association) (1949–1952)
1949	Johnson C. Smith	3–4–1	2–4–1	12th	W Iodine Bowl
1950	Johnson C. Smith	2–5–1	2–4–1	12th	
1951	Johnson C. Smith	3–5	3–4	12th	
1952	Johnson C. Smith	5–2	4–2	T–4th	
Johnson C. Smith:		13–16–2	11–14–2		
Total:		13–16–2			
