= Jamil Demby =

American football player (born 1996)

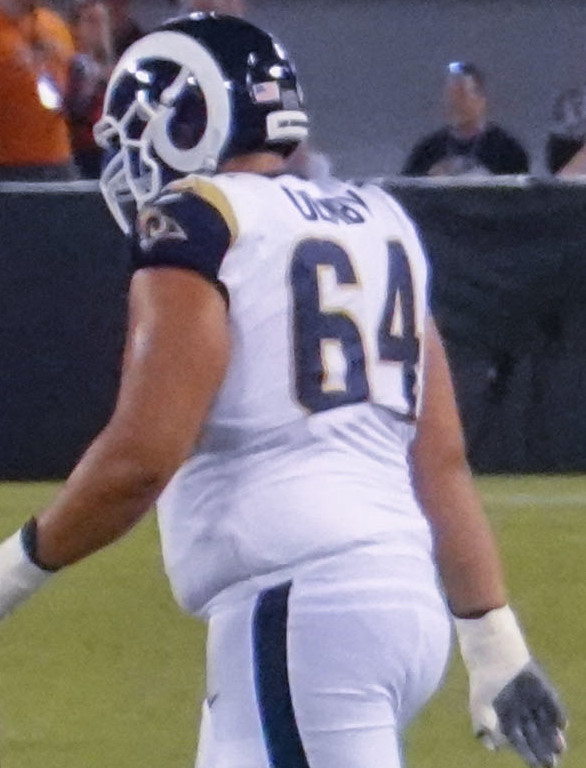
- Demby with the Los Angeles Rams in 2018

No. 64
- Position: Offensive guard

Personal information
- Born: June 20, 1996 (age 30); Vineland, New Jersey, U.S.
- Listed height: 6 ft 5 in (1.96 m)
- Listed weight: 321 lb (146 kg)

Career information
- High school: Vineland
- College: Maine
- NFL draft: 2018: 6th round, 192nd overall pick

Career history
- Los Angeles Rams (2018)*; Detroit Lions (2018); Los Angeles Rams (2018–2021); Vegas Vipers (2023)
- * Offseason or practice squad member only

Awards and highlights
- Super Bowl champion (LVI); First-team FCS All-America (2018); First-team All-CAA (2018)

Career NFL statistics
- Games played: 6
- Games started: 1
- Stats at Pro Football Reference

Jamil Demby (born June 20, 1996) is an American former professional football player who was an offensive guard in the National Football League (NFL). He played college football for the Maine Black Bears.

== Early life ==
A native of Vineland, New Jersey, Demby attended Vineland High School. Demby is of mixed ethnicity with a Latina mother and an African American father. play four years for the Umaine Blackbears.

== College career ==
Demby played college football for the University of Maine, appearing in 42 games with the team. As a senior he led the offensive line to allowing the fewest sacks in the Colonial Athletic Association (CAA) with 19. He was named to the first-team all-CAA, the all-New England Football team, the Football Championship Subdivision (FCS) All-America first-team and the STATS FCS All-America second-team. Demby graduated with a degree in kinesiology in May 2018.

== Professional career ==
Pre-draft measurables
| Height | Weight | Arm length | Hand span | 40-yard dash | 20-yard shuttle | Three-cone drill | Vertical jump | Broad jump | Bench press |
|---|---|---|---|---|---|---|---|---|---|
| 6 ft 4 1/2 in (1.94 m) | 319 lb (145 kg) | 33 3/4 in (0.86 m) | 10 3/4 in (0.27 m) | 5.58 s | 4.95 s | 7.86 s | 23.5 in (0.60 m) | 8 ft 2 in (2.49 m) | 17 reps |
All values from NFL Combine

=== Los Angeles Rams (first stint) ===
Demby was selected by the Los Angeles Rams in the sixth round, 192nd overall, of the 2018 NFL draft, through a pick acquired from the Dallas Cowboys in a trade for Tavon Austin. He was waived by the Rams on September 8, 2018.

=== Detroit Lions ===
On September 11, 2018, Demby was claimed off waivers by the Detroit Lions. He was waived on September 18, 2018, and was re-signed to the practice squad.

=== Los Angeles Rams (second stint) ===
On December 12, 2018, the Rams signed Demby off the Lions' practice squad. He was waived on September 4, 2020, and re-signed to the practice squad. He was elevated to the active roster on December 26 for the team's week 16 game against the Seattle Seahawks, and reverted to the practice squad after the game. On January 18, 2021, Demby signed a reserve/futures contract with the Rams. He was waived/injured on August 4, 2021, and placed on injured reserve. In 2021, Demby won Super Bowl LVI when the Rams defeated the Cincinnati Bengals 23–20.

=== Vegas Vipers ===
Demby was placed on the reserve list by the Vegas Vipers of the XFL on April 17, 2023. The Vipers folded when the XFL and United States Football League merged to create the United Football League (UFL).
