= Vineland Borough, New Jersey =

- Borough
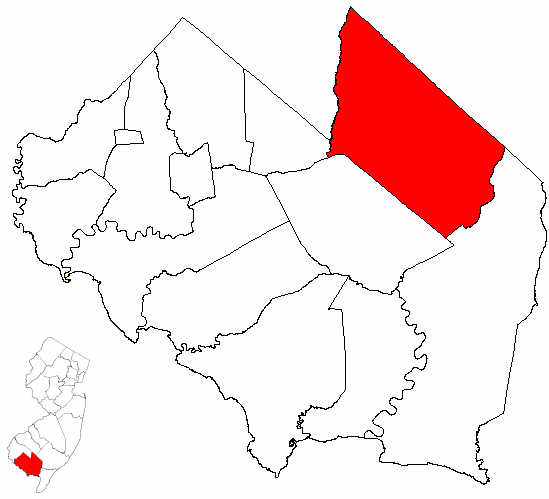
- Map of Vineland City in Cumberland County, which includes the former Vineland Borough and Landis Township. Inset: Location of Cumberland County highlighted in New Jersey.

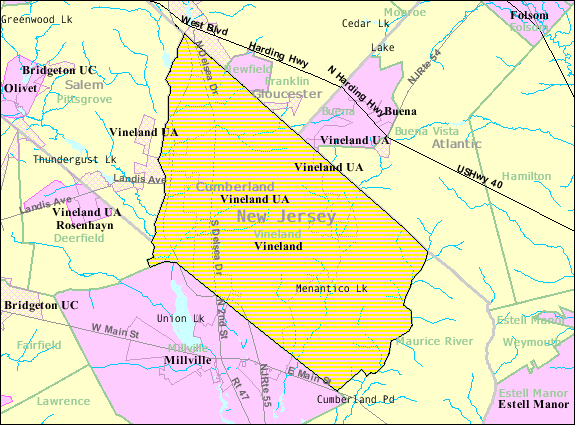
- Census Bureau map of Vineland City, New Jersey, which includes the former Vineland Borough and Landis Township.
- Country: United States
- State: New Jersey
- County: Cumberland
- Incorporated: May 28, 1880

Government
  - Type: Borough
- Time zone: UTC-5 (Eastern (EST))
  - Summer (DST): UTC-4 (Eastern (EDT))

Vineland Borough is a defunct borough in Cumberland County, New Jersey that existed from 1880 until 1952.

Vineland was originally incorporated as a borough by an act of the New Jersey Legislature on May 28, 1880, from portions of Landis Township, based on the results of a referendum held three days earlier. On July 1, 1952, Vineland Borough and Landis Township were merged to form Vineland city, based on the results of a referendum held on February 5, 1952. Festivities on July 1, 1952, when the merger took effect, included a parade and speeches from such notables as Senator Estes Kefauver.

== History ==
Historical population
Census	Pop.	Note	%±
1880	2,519		—
1890	3,822		51.7%
1900	4,370		14.3%
1910	5,282		20.9%
1920	6,432		21.8%
1930	7,556		17.5%
1940	7,914		4.7%
1950	8,155		3.0%
Population sources: 1870-1950 1910-1930; 1930-1950

Charles K. Landis purchased 20,000 acres (81 km^{2}) of land in 1861, near Millville, New Jersey, and along an existing railroad line with service to Philadelphia, to create his own alcohol-free utopian society based on agriculture and progressive thinking. The first houses were built in 1862, and train service was established to Philadelphia and New York City, with the population reaching 5,500 by 1865.

Established as a Temperance Town, where the sale of alcohol was prohibited, Landis required that purchasers of land in Vineland had to build a house on the purchased property within a year of purchase, that 2½ acres of the often-heavily wooded land had to be cleared and farmed each year, and that adequate space be placed between houses and roads to allow for planting of flowers and shade trees along the routes through town. Landis Avenue was constructed as a 100-foot (30 m) wide and about 1-mile (2 km) long road running east–west through the center of the community, with other, narrower roads connecting at right angles to each other.

After determining that the Vineland soil was well-suited for growing grapes (hence the name), Landis started advertising to attract Italian grape growers to Vineland, offering 20 acres (81,000 m^{2}) of land that had to be cleared and used to grow grapes. Thomas Bramwell Welch founded Welch's Grape Juice, and purchased the locally grown grapes to make "unfermented wine" (or grape juice). The fertile ground also attracted the glass-making industry and was home to the Progresso soup company. Throughout the first half of the 20th century, most of the city was involved in the poultry industry, which led to the city being dubbed “The Egg Basket of America.”

Vineland Poultry Laboratories (now Lohman Animal Health) was started by Arthur Goldhaft. Dr. Goldhaft is credited with putting "a chicken in every pot" after developing the fowl pox chicken vaccine that saved millions of chickens from death. Dr. Goldhaft's work at Vineland Poultry Laboratories in Vineland, helped protect the world's chicken supply from the fowl pox disease.

Additionally, Vineland had New Jersey's first school for the mentally handicapped, the Vineland Developmental Center, which now has an east and west campus. These institutions house mentally handicapped women in fully staffed cottages. Henry H. Goddard, an American psychologist, coined the term "Moron" while directing the Research Laboratory at the Vineland Training School in Vineland. This facility was sufficiently well known that one American Prison Association pamphlet in 1955 heralded Vineland as "famous for its contributions to our knowledge of the feebleminded".
