= New Jersey Civil Service Commission =

State agency of New Jersey, United States

State of New Jersey Civil Service Commission

Agency overview
- Formed: 1908; 2008 (reestablished)
- Preceding agency: New Jersey Department of Personnel
- Jurisdiction: New Jersey
- Headquarters: Trenton, New Jersey
- Agency executive: Mary Cruz (acting), Chair/CEO
- Parent agency: Department of Labor and Workforce Development
- Website: nj.gov/csc

The New Jersey Civil Service Commission (CSC) is an independent body within the New Jersey state government under the auspices of the Department of Labor and Workforce Development. It existed from 1908 to 1986, and was reestablished in 2008.

The CSC interprets, amends and adopts rules regarding civil service employment in New Jersey. It hears and rules on appeals filed by state, county and municipal employees, employment candidates, and appointing authorities. It acts as an unbiased forum for appeals to be heard and fair, impartial decisions to be rendered, and is responsible for enforcing such decisions.

The CSC is composed of a five-member, bipartisan, public body with a full-time chairperson and four part-time members, each appointed to a four-year term by the Governor of New Jersey with the consent of the New Jersey Senate.

The position of Chair/Chief Executive Officer is a cabinet-level position.

== History ==
Established in 1908, the Civil Service Commission's founding is rooted in the early 20th century Progressive movement, which had a goal of fighting corruption and inefficiency in government. Requiring that the commission make all appointment decisions "according to merit and fitness" was part of an effort to subvert a spoils system, and to have a civil service that had greater skill and specialization in addressing the state's work.

The original 1908 law establishing the commission was amended numerous times before a 1930 law collected the previous laws and amendments, overhauling regulation of the civil service. With the adoption of the 1947 state constitution, "the new Department of Civil Service was established as one of the principal executive departments, with the Civil Service Commission continuing as a prime entity."

Efforts in the 1970s to study the civil service system and improve it resulted in the 1986 Civil Service Act. The 1986 act was a major revision to the state civil service system, which included replacing the Department of Civil Service, Civil Service Commission, and President of the Commission with the New Jersey Department of Personnel, a bipartisan Merit System Board, and a Commissioner of Personnel. A 2008 revision of the 1986 act abolished the Department of Personnel, replacing it with the Civil Service Commission, "which is in, but independent of any supervision or control by the Department of Labor and Workforce Development." The CSC assumed many of the roles of the Department of Personnel and Merit System Board.

=== Christie administration ===
During much of the Christie administration, the CSC operated with three members or was unable to conduct business due to a lack of quorum.

== Membership ==
=== Former members ===
Thelma Parkinson Sharp – Appointed as president by Governor Robert B. Meyner. 1959 to 1970.

Robert M. Czech – Appointed as Acting Chair/CEO by Governor Chris Christie. February 22, 2010 to February 2018.

Deirdré Webster Cobb, Esq. – Appointed as Acting Chair/CEO by Governor Phil Murphy. March/April 2018 to January 1, 2023

=== Current members ===
- Mary Cruz – Appointed as Acting Chair/CEO by Governor Mikie Sherill on February 25, 2026.
- Dolores Gorczyca
- Daniel W. O'Mullan
- Diomedes Tsitouras
- Christina Mongon

== See also ==
- Governorship of Chris Christie
- Governorship of Phil Murphy
