= Glenn Carbonara =

American soccer player (born 1966)

Personal information
- Date of birth: September 17, 1966 (age 60)
- Place of birth: Vineland, New Jersey, U.S.
- Height: 5 ft 11 in (1.80 m)
- Position: Defender

College career
Years	Team	Apps	(Gls)
1984–1987	Rutgers Scarlet Knights		

Senior career*
Years	Team	Apps	(Gls)
1988–1990	Baltimore Blast (indoor)	40	(6)
1990–1991	San Diego Sockers (indoor)	32	(5)
1991–1992	Illinois Thunder (indoor)	24	(5)
1992–1996	Cleveland Crunch (indoor)	155	(34)
1996–2002	Milwaukee Wave (indoor)	221	(42)
2002–2003	Philadelphia KiXX (indoor)	34	(5)
Total		506	(97)

International career
1996–2000	U.S. Futsal	12	(3)
- * Club domestic league appearances and goals

Glenn Carbonara (born September 17, 1966) is an American retired soccer defender who spent his entire professional career in the American indoor leagues.

== Youth ==
Raised in Vineland, New Jersey, Carbonara graduated in 1984 from Vineland High School. He was a 1984 Parade Magazine High School All American soccer player. He holds the single season scoring record for the state of New Jersey with 67 goals set in 1983. He is a member of the Vineland High School Hall of Fame. Carbonara attended Rutgers University, playing on the men's soccer team from 1984 to 1988.

== Professional ==
In 1988, the Minnesota Strikers selected Carbonara in the Major Indoor Soccer League draft. When the Strikers folded, the Baltimore Blast acquired Carbonara's rights. He spent two seasons in Baltimore, but was released before the 1990–1991 season. In October 1990, Carbonara signed with the San Diego Sockers. That season, the Sockers won the league championship while Carbonara was named the Championship Series Unsung Hero. The Sockers released him during the off-season and Carbonara joined the Illinois Thunder of the National Professional Soccer League. In 1992, Carbonara moved to the Cleveland Crunch. In 1993, the Crunch won the NPSL title, giving Carbonara his second of his career. On December 27, 1996, the Crunch traded Carbonara, Obi Moneme, and Todd Dusosky to the Milwaukee Wave for Matt Knowles. Carbonara remained with the Wave until 2002. In 2001, he was named the NPSL Defender of the Year. On July 24, 2002, the Philadelphia KiXX purchased Carbonara's contract from the Wave. He played one season, then retired. Carbonara ended his career playing in 10 championship series winning 6 ( 1 with the San Diego Sockers, 2 with the Cleveland Crunch and 3 with the Milwaukee Wave). Carbonara was also a six time all- star in the MISL/NPSL/MSL.

== International ==
Carbonara played for the United States national futsal team.
