= Vineland, New Jersey =

City in Cumberland County, New Jersey, US

- City
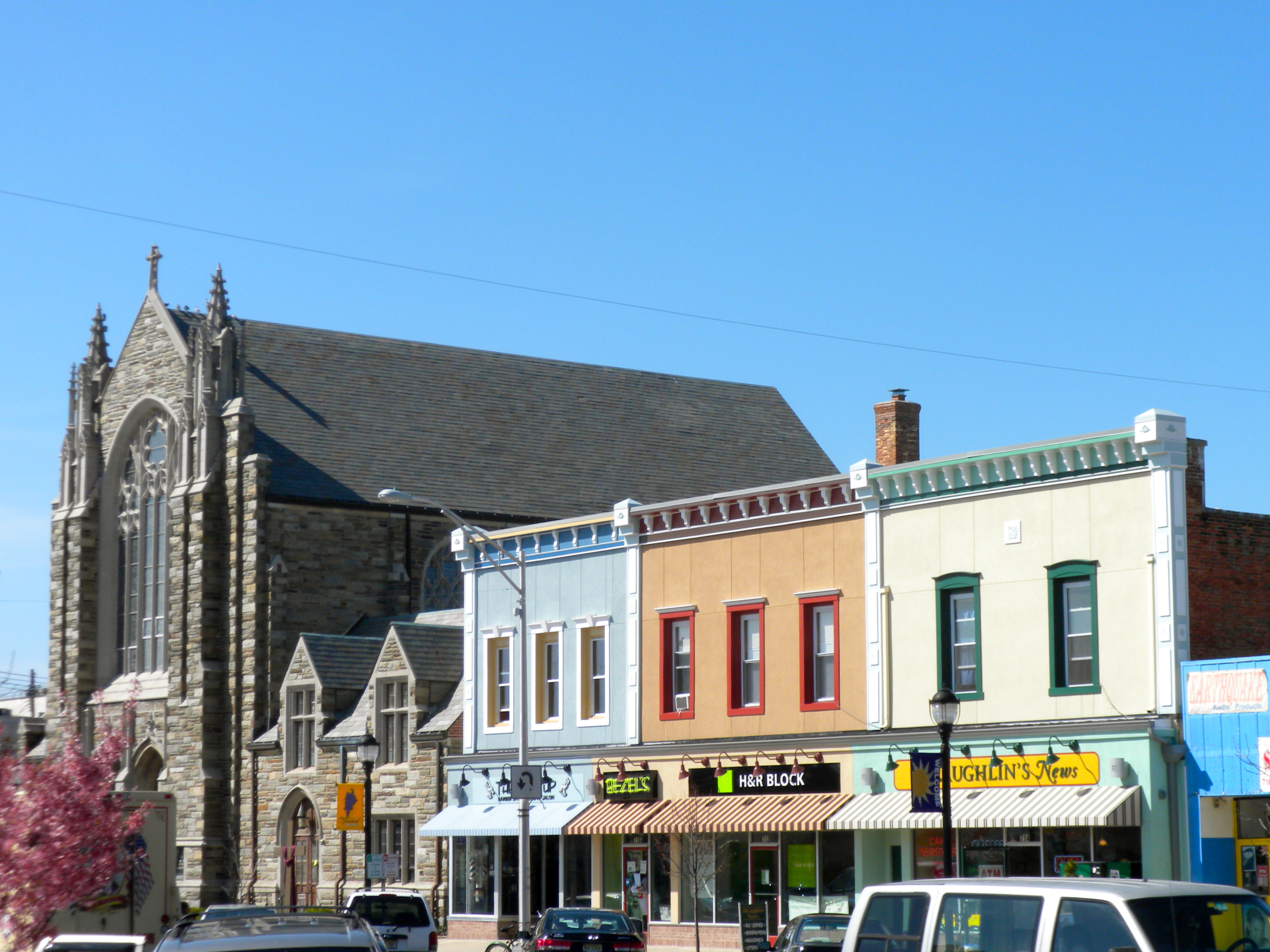
- Downtown Vineland

- Flag Seal wordmark
- Motto: "A Harvest of Opportunities in the Heart of the Northeast"
- Location of Vineland in Cumberland County highlighted in red (left). Inset map: Location of Cumberland County in New Jersey highlighted in orange (right).

- Location in Cumberland County Location in New Jersey Location in the United States
- Coordinates: 39°27′54″N 75°00′23″W
- Country: United States
- State: New Jersey
- County: Cumberland
- Incorporated: February 5, 1952

Government
  - Type: Faulkner Act Mayor-Council
  - Body: City council
  - Mayor: Anthony Fanucci (term ends December 31, 2028)
  - Administrator: Robert E. Dickenson Jr.
  - Municipal clerk: Richard G. Franchetta

Area
  - Total: 68.99 sq mi (178.68 km^{2})
  - Land: 68.40 sq mi (177.16 km^{2})
  - Water: 0.59 sq mi (1.52 km^{2}) 0.86%
  - Rank: 16th of 565 in state 2nd of 14 in county
- Elevation: 98 ft (30 m)

Population (2020)
  - Total: 60,780
  - Estimate (2023): 60,797
  - Rank: 639th in country (as of 2021); 26th of 565 in state 1st of 14 in county
  - Density: 888.7/sq mi (343.1/km^{2})
  - Rank: 396th of 565 in state 2nd of 14 in county
- Time zone: UTC−05:00 (Eastern (EST))
  - Summer (DST): UTC−04:00 (Eastern (EDT))
- ZIP Codes: 08360–08362
- Area code: 856
- FIPS code: 3401176070
- GNIS feature ID: 0885428
- Website: www.vinelandcity.org

Vineland /ˈvaɪnlənd/ is a city and the most populous municipality in Cumberland County, within the U.S. state of New Jersey. Bridgeton and Vineland are the two principal cities of the Vineland-Bridgeton metropolitan statistical area, which encompasses those cities and all of Cumberland County for statistical purposes. The Vineland-Bridgeton metropolitan area and the city of Vineland are also included as part of larger Philadelphia metropolitan area, also known as the Delaware Valley. The MSA had a population of 156,898 as of the 2010 census. As of the 2020 United States census, the city's population was 60,780, its highest decennial count ever and an increase of 56 (+0.1%) from the 60,724 recorded at the 2010 census, which in turn reflected an increase of 4,453 (+7.9%) from the 56,271 counted in the 2000 census. The Census Bureau's Population Estimates Program calculated that the city's population was 60,491 in 2022, ranking the city the 639th-most-populous in the country.

Vineland was incorporated on July 1, 1952, following the merger of Landis Township and Vineland Borough, which was approved by voters in a referendum held on February 5, 1952. Celebrations marking the merger included a parade and speeches by prominent figures, among them U.S. Senator Estes Kefauver. The city’s name reflects the intentions of its founder, who planned to use the land for grape cultivation.

Geographically, Vineland is located in South Jersey. It has large Italian-American and Hispanic-American populations.

== History ==
Charles K. Landis purchased 30,000 acres (47 mi^{2}) of land in 1861 and an additional 23,000 acres (36 mi^{2}) in 1874, near Millville, along what would become the West Jersey and Seashore Railroad line, which provided service between Camden and Cape May. He intended to establish an alcohol-free, utopian community based on agriculture and progressive ideals. The first houses were constructed in 1862, and rail service connected the settlement to Philadelphia and New York City. The population reached approximately 5,500 by 1865 and grew to 11,000 by 1875.

Vineland was an early temperance town in which the sale of alcohol was prohibited. Landis required land purchasers to build a house on their property within one year of acquisition, to clear and cultivate 2 1/2 acres (10,000 m^{2}) of the often heavily wooded land each year, and to leave adequate space between houses and roads for the planting of flowers and shade trees along the town’s thoroughfares. Landis Avenue was constructed as a 100-foot (30 m) wide and approximately 1-mile (2 km) long road running east–west through the center of the community, with narrower streets intersecting it at right angles.

After determining that the soil in Vineland was well suited for grape cultivation (hence the city’s name), Charles K. Landis began advertising to attract Italian grape growers to the area. He offered 20 acres (81,000 m^{2}) land, on the condition that it be cleared and planted with grapevines. Thomas Bramwell Welch, founder of Welch's Grape Juice, purchased locally grown grapes to produce what he described as “unfermented wine,” or grape juice. The area’s sandy soil also supported the glassmaking industry and attracted companies such as Progresso Soup. During the first half of the 20th century, much of the city’s economy was centered on poultry farming, earning Vineland the nickname "The Egg Basket of America."

Vineland Poultry Laboratories was founded by Arthur Goldhaft. Goldhaft is credited with helping to popularize the phrase “a chicken in every pot” through his development of a fowl pox vaccine that saved millions of chickens from death. His work at Vineland Poultry Laboratories in Vineland contributed significantly to protecting the global poultry supply from fowlpox. The facility’s operations were closed by Lohmann Animal Health in 2007.

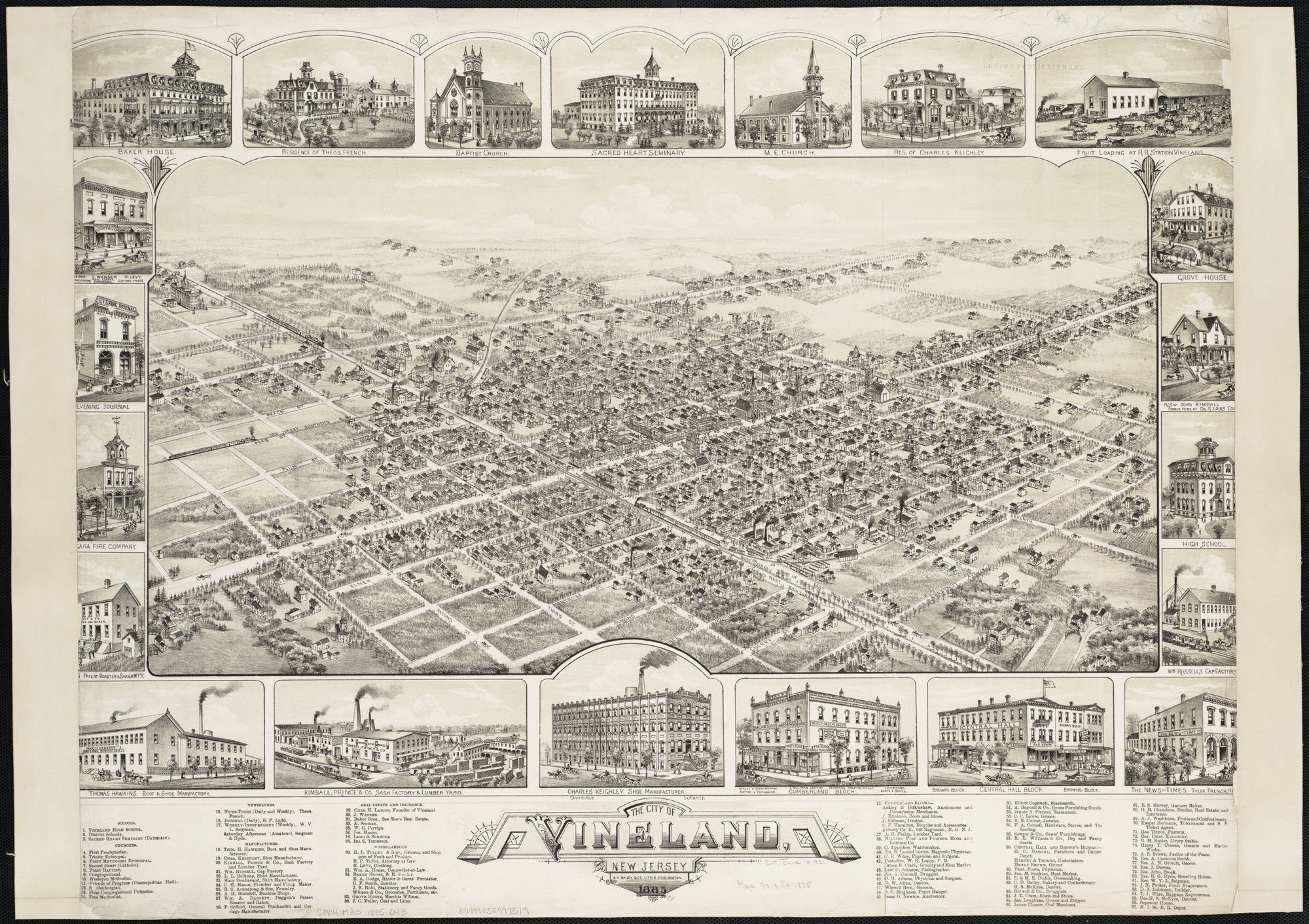
Bird's-eye view in 1885

Vineland is home to New Jersey’s first school for people with intellectual disabilities, the Vineland Developmental Center, which now operates east and west campuses. The institution housed women with intellectual disabilities in fully staffed cottages. Henry H. Goddard, an American psychologist, coined the term "Moron" while serving as director of the Research Laboratory at the Vineland Training School. The facility was well known enough that a 1955 pamphlet published by the American Prison Association described Vineland as "famous for its contributions to our knowledge of the feebleminded".

Vineland celebrated its 150th birthday in 2011. Mayor Robert Romano initially ordered a custom cake from Buddy Valastro of Carlo's Bake Shop in Hoboken; the business is featured in the TLC reality television series Cake Boss. After outcry from local business owners, the order was canceled and five Vineland bakeries donated elaborate cakes for the event as well as over 1,000 servings of cake for the celebration.

Since the 1970s, the city has held an annual dandelion festival. Introduced to the area by early Italian immigrants, dandelion greens are cultivated as a crop by farms in and around Vineland.

Barbara Kingsolver's 2018 novel Unsheltered is set in Vineland.

== Geography ==
According to the U.S. Census Bureau, the city had a total area of 68.99 square miles (178.68 km^{2}), including 68.39 square miles (177.14 km^{2}) of land and 0.60 square miles (1.54 km^{2}) of water (0.86%). Of all the municipalities in New Jersey to hold the type of City, Vineland is the largest in total area. (Hamilton Township in Atlantic County is the largest municipality in New Jersey in terms of land area. Galloway Township, also in Atlantic County, is the largest municipality in total area, including open water within its borders.)

Unincorporated communities, localities and place names located partially or completely within the city include Clayville, Hances Bridge, Leamings Mill, Menantico, North Vineland, Parvins Branch, South Vineland, Willow Grove and Pleasantville. That last community (adjacent to Newfield Boro) is not to be confused with the City of Pleasantville in Atlantic County.

Vineland borders the municipalities of Deerfield Township, Millville and Maurice River Township in Cumberland County; Buena and Buena Vista Township in Atlantic County; Franklin Township and Newfield Boro in Gloucester County; and Pittsgrove Township in Salem County. The city is approximately 38 miles (61 km) from the Atlantic Ocean.

== Demographics ==
Historical population
Census	Pop.	Note	%±
1870	7,077		—
1880	6,005		−15.1%
1890	7,677		27.8%
1900	9,091		18.4%
1910	11,717		28.9%
1920	16,834		43.7%
1930	21,603		28.3%
1940	24,439		13.1%
1950	29,573		21.0%
1960	37,685		27.4%
1970	47,399		25.8%
1980	53,753		13.4%
1990	54,780		1.9%
2000	56,271		2.7%
2010	60,724		7.9%
2020	60,780		0.1%
2023 (est.)	60,797		0.0%
Population sources: 1870–2010; 1870–1920 1870 1880–1890; 1890–1910 1910–1930; 1940–2000 2000; 2010 2020

=== 2020 census ===
As of the 2020 census, Vineland had a population of 60,780, a slight increase of 56 (+0.1%) from the 60,724 recorded in the 2010 census. The population density was approximately 887.5 persons per square mile.

The median age was 39.9 years. The age distribution included 14,206 people under 18 (23.4%), 35,955 between 18 and 64, and 10,619 aged 65 or older (17.5%). For every 100 females there were 92.6 males, and for every 100 females age 18 and over there were 89.7 males age 18 and over.

94.9% of residents lived in urban areas, while 5.1% lived in rural areas.

There were 22,176 households in Vineland, of which 33.5% had children under the age of 18 living in them. Of all households, 42.3% were married-couple households, 17.3% were households with a male householder and no spouse or partner present, and 31.8% were households with a female householder and no spouse or partner present. About 25.2% of all households were made up of individuals and 12.2% had someone living alone who was 65 years of age or older.

There were 23,477 housing units, of which 5.5% were vacant. The homeowner vacancy rate was 1.8% and the rental vacancy rate was 4.9%.

Racial composition as of the 2020 census
Race	Number	Percent
White	28,561	47.0%
Black or African American	8,483	14.0%
American Indian and Alaska Native	670	1.1%
Asian	1,312	2.2%
Native Hawaiian and Other Pacific Islander	12	0.0%
Some other race	12,433	20.5%
Two or more races	9,309	15.3%
Hispanic or Latino (of any race)	26,315	43.3%

=== Recent estimates (2023) ===
According to the 2023 American Community Survey (or other recent estimate sources), the estimated population was 60,692. The median age was about 38.8 years. The median household income was approximately US$65,854 and the estimated poverty rate was about 13.9%. Approximately 12.5% of the population were foreign-born.

=== Housing & households ===
According to recent estimates, there were 21,945 households with an average of 2.7 persons per household. The median value of owner-occupied housing units was approximately US$218,200.

=== Education & workforce ===
About 80.7% of residents aged 25 years and older had at least a high school diploma and approximately 23.4% had a bachelor’s degree or higher. For workers living in Vineland the average commute time was about 24 minutes.

=== Note on comparability ===
Some estimates are from the American Community Survey (ACS) 5-year averages and thus are subject to sampling error; comparisons with 100% data from the 2020 decennial census should be made with caution.

== Economy ==
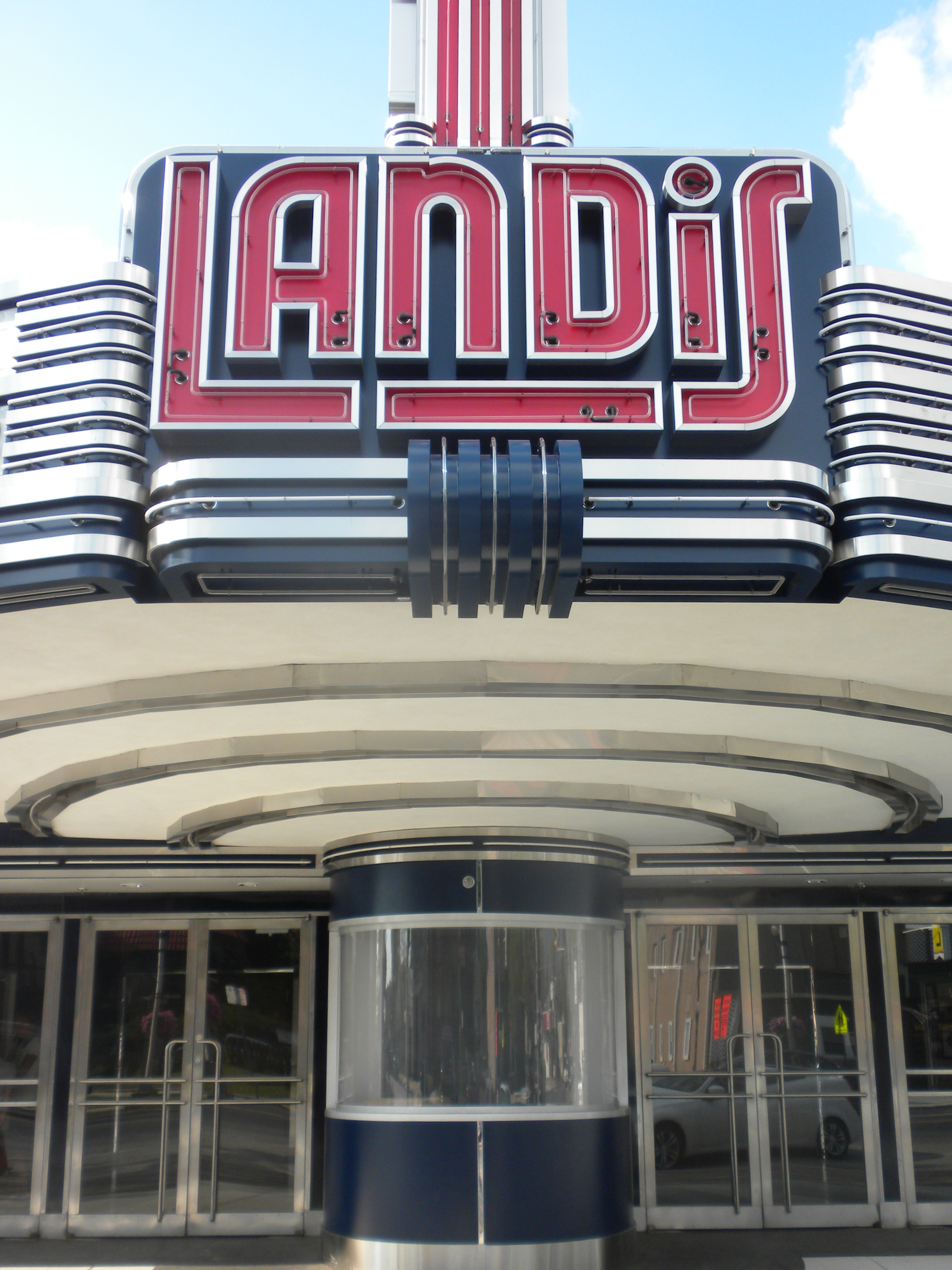
The marquee of the Landis Theater

Portions of the city are part of a joint Urban Enterprise Zone (UEZ) with Millville, one of 32 zones covering 37 municipalities statewide. Millville was selected in 1983 as one of the initial group of 10 zones chosen to participate in the program. In addition to other benefits to encourage employment and investment within the Zone, shoppers can take advantage of a reduced 3.3125% sales tax rate (half of the 6 5/8% rate charged statewide) at eligible merchants. Established in October 1988, the city's Urban Enterprise Zone status expires in December 2023.

The main street in Vineland is Landis Avenue. The traditional downtown area is located several blocks east and west of the intersection of Landis Avenue and the Boulevard. The Boulevard is a pair of roads that flank the main north–south railroad, which connected Vineland with Cape May to the south and Camden/Philadelphia to the north. After many years of decline, there has been much recent activity to restore the vitality of "The Avenue" and the center city area. New construction includes a new transportation center, courthouse, post office, elementary school / community center and sidewalk upgrades. In 2005, Vineland was designated a Main Street Community and, through the work of this group, money has been earmarked to continue this improvement through property and facade improvements, business retention and marketing.

== Government ==
=== Local government ===
The City of Vineland is governed within the Faulkner Act, formally known as the Optional Municipal Charter Law, under the Mayor-Council (Plan A), implemented based on the recommendations of a Charter Study Commission as of July 1, 1952, months after the city's formation. The city is one of 71 municipalities (of the 564) statewide that use this form of government. The governing body is a mayor, serving as the city's chief executive, and a five-member city council, serving as the city's legislature. The mayor and council are elected at-large to serve concurrent four-year terms of office in non-partisan elections held in leap years as part of the November general election. An ordinance passed by the council in 2011 shifted elections from May to November, effectively extending the term of those members serving at the time by six months.

As of 2025, the mayor of Vineland is Anthony Fanucci who is in his third term, which ends December 31, 2028. Members of the Vineland city council are Council President Paul Spinelli, Council Vice President Cruz Gomez, Elizabeth Arthur, Scott English and Albert Vargas, all serving concurrent terms of office ending December 31, 2028.

In November 2019, the city council appointed Elizabeth Arthur to fill the seat vacated by Angela Calakos following her resignation after announcing that she was moving out of the city. Arthur served on an interim basis until the November 2019 general election, when she was elected to serve the balance of the term office.

In January 2013, Ruben Bermudez took office as the city's first Hispanic mayor.

=== Federal, state and county representation ===
Vineland is located in the 2nd Congressional District and is part of New Jersey's 1st state legislative district.

For the 119th United States Congress, New Jersey's 2nd congressional district is represented by Jeff Van Drew (R, Dennis Township). New Jersey is represented in the United States Senate by Democrats Cory Booker (Newark, term ends 2027) and Andy Kim (Moorestown, term ends 2031).

For the 2026–2027 session, the 1st legislative district of the New Jersey Legislature is represented in the State Senate by Mike Testa (R, Vineland) and in the General Assembly by Antwan McClellan (R, Ocean City) and Erik K. Simonsen (R, Lower Township).

Cumberland County is governed by a Board of County Commissioners composed of seven members who are elected at large by the citizens of Cumberland County in partisan elections and serve staggered three-year terms in office, with either two or three seats coming up for election each year in a three-year cycle. Annually, the seven board members select a Director and Deputy Director for one-year terms. As of 2025, members of the Cumberland County Board of County Commissioners (with party affiliation, residence and term-end year listed in parentheses) are:

Douglas A. Albrecht (R, Vineland, 2025), Deputy Director Antonio Romero (R, Vineland, 2027), Sandra Taylor (R, Downe Township; 2026), Victoria Groetsch-Lods (R, Vineland, 2025), Arthur Marchand (R, Hopewell Township, 2026), James Sauro (R, Vineland, 2026) and Robert A. Austino (D, Bridgeton, 2027).

The county's constitutional officers are: Clerk Celeste Riley (D, Bridgeton, 2029), Sheriff Michael Donato (R, Bridgeton, 2026) and Surrogate Rudolph Luisi (R, Vineland, 2028).

=== Politics ===
As of March 2011, there were a total of 37,583 registered voters in Vineland, of which 10,388 (27.6%) were registered as Democrats, 6,109 (16.3%) were registered as Republicans and 21,059 (56.0%) were registered as Unaffiliated. There were 27 voters registered to other parties.

Gubernatorial election results for Vineland
Year	Republican		Democratic		Third party(ies)	
Year	No.	%	No.	%	No.	%
2025	7,366	42.92%	9,690	56.46%	107	0.62%
2021	6,925	51.54%	6,423	47.80%	88	0.65%
2017	4,346	37.96%	6,795	59.36%	307	2.68%
2013	7,171	55.51%	5,527	42.78%	221	1.71%
2009	5,725	40.75%	7,457	53.08%	866	6.16%
2005	5,062	36.60%	8,337	60.27%	433	3.13%

In the 2012 presidential election, Democrat Barack Obama received 64.9% of the vote (15,299 cast), ahead of Republican Mitt Romney with 34.2% (8,074 votes), and other candidates with 0.9% (218 votes), among the 23,880 ballots cast by the city's 39,605 registered voters (289 ballots were spoiled), for a turnout of 60.3%. In the 2008 presidential election, Democrat Barack Obama received 62.6% of the vote (15,743 cast), ahead of Republican John McCain, who received 35.2% (8,862 votes), with 25,144 ballots cast among the city's 39,098 registered voters, for a turnout of 64.3%. In the 2004 presidential election, Democrat John Kerry received 53.8% of the vote (12,506 ballots cast), outpolling Republican George W. Bush, who received around 43.6% (10,131 votes), with 23,253 ballots cast among the city's 35,943 registered voters, for a turnout percentage of 64.7.

United States presidential election results for Vineland 2024 2020 2016 2012 2008 2004
Year	Republican		Democratic		Third party(ies)	
Year	No.	%	No.	%	No.	%
2024	11,494	48.04%	12,144	50.76%	287	1.20%
2020	11,477	42.57%	15,322	56.84%	159	0.59%
2016	9,464	40.49%	13,141	56.22%	768	3.29%
2012	8,074	34.33%	15,229	64.75%	218	0.93%
2008	8,862	35.24%	15,743	62.61%	539	2.14%
2004	10,131	43.57%	12,506	53.78%	616	2.65%

In the 2013 gubernatorial election, Republican Chris Christie received 55.5% of the vote (7,171 cast), ahead of Democrat Barbara Buono with 42.8% (5,527 votes), and other candidates with 1.7% (221 votes), among the 13,243 ballots cast by the city's 37,789 registered voters (324 ballots were spoiled), for a turnout of 35.0%. In the 2009 gubernatorial election, Democrat Jon Corzine received 52.2% of the vote (7,457 ballots cast), ahead of both Republican Chris Christie with 40.1% (5,725 votes) and Independent Chris Daggett with 4.8% (681 votes), with 14,289 ballots cast among the city's 37,092 registered voters, yielding a 38.5% turnout.

United States Senate election results for Vineland1
Year	Republican		Democratic		Third party(ies)	
Year	No.	%	No.	%	No.	%
2024	10,056	45.58%	11,425	51.79%	579	2.62%
2018	7,343	42.89%	9,066	52.95%	712	4.16%
2012	6,304	30.74%	13,809	67.34%	393	1.92%
2006	5,249	41.29%	7,156	56.29%	307	2.42%

United States Senate election results for Vineland2
Year	Republican		Democratic		Third party(ies)	
Year	No.	%	No.	%	No.	%
2020	10,401	39.58%	14,800	56.32%	1,079	4.11%
2014	4,792	42.39%	6,295	55.69%	217	1.92%
2013	2,638	43.60%	3,316	54.80%	97	1.60%
2008	7,369	34.10%	13,749	63.62%	493	2.28%

== Education ==
=== Primary and secondary ===
The Vineland Public Schools serves students in public school for pre-kindergarten through twelfth grade. The district is one of 31 former Abbott districts statewide that were established pursuant to the decision by the New Jersey Supreme Court in Abbott v. Burke which are now referred to as "SDA Districts" based on the requirement for the state to cover all costs for school building and renovation projects in these districts under the supervision of the New Jersey Schools Development Authority. As of the 2020–21 school year, the district, comprised of 14 schools, had an enrollment of 10,266 students and 731.9 classroom teachers (on an FTE basis), for a student–teacher ratio of 14.0:1. Schools in the district (with 2020–21 enrollment data from the National Center for Education Statistics) are Casimer M. Dallago Jr. Preschool Center / IMPACT (with 215 students; in grade Pre-K), Dane Barse Elementary School (264; K–5), Solve D'Ippolito Elementary School (474; K–5), Marie Durand School (496; K–5), Edward Johnstone School (183; 5–8), Dr. William Mennies Elementary School (596; K–5), Pauline J. Petway Elementary School (504; K–5), Anthony Rossi Elementary School (637; K–5), Gloria M. Sabater Elementary School (784; K–5), Dr. John H. Winslow Elementary School (462; K–5), Sgt. Dominick Pilla Middle School (682; 6–8), Veterans Memorial Middle School (818; 6–8), Thomas W. Wallace Jr. Middle School (783; 6–8), Cunningham Academy for students with "personal or academic challenges that prevent them from reaching their full potential" (NA; 7–12) and Vineland High School (2,589; 9–12).

Students are also eligible to attend Cumberland County Technical Education Center in Millville (with a Vineland post office address), serving students from the entire county in its full-time technical training programs, which are offered without charge to students who are county residents. The school relocated starting in the 2016–17 school year to a 200,000 square feet (19,000 m^{2}) campus in Vineland constructed at a cost of $70 million and located next to Cumberland County College. The school initiated a new full-time high school program that included 240 students who will be part of the initial graduating class of 2020.

Cumberland Christian School is a private coeducational day school located in Vineland, serving students in pre-kindergarten through twelfth grade. The school, founded in 1946 as Vineland Christian School, has a total enrollment of over 1,000 students.

The city is home to two Catholic elementary schools, Bishop Schad Regional School (combining St. Francis and Sacred Heart Schools) and St. Mary Regional School. Both schools operate under the supervision of the Roman Catholic Diocese of Camden. Bishop Schad formed in 2007 from the merger of Sacred Heart Regional School (Sacred Heart/St. Isidore) and St. Francis of Assisi, using the Sacred Heart site. Sacred Heart High School served grades 9–12 from 1927 until its closure by the Camden Diocese in June 2013 due to declining enrollment. St. Joseph High School in Hammonton was the closest Catholic high school. However that school closed in 2020.

The Ellison School was a private, nonsectarian coeducational Pre-K–8 day school located on South Spring Road in Vineland. The school was founded in 1959 as a grade 1–3 school, and moved to its Vineland site in 1968. By 2016, enrollment had dropped to the point where closure was considered. By late 2019 the school had 11 instructors, three assistants to the instructors, and 76 students. Ellison closed in December 2019. 25 of the students moved to the Pre-K–8 Christian school Edgarton Christian Academy, then in Newfield, which planned to move to Buena.

=== College ===
Rowan College of South Jersey Cumberland Campus (former Cumberland County College) is partially in the Vineland city limits with the other portion in Millville.

=== Library ===
Vineland Public Library is the city's public library.

== Points of interest ==
- The Delsea Drive-In, located on Route 47 (Delsea Drive) north of County Route 552, was for years the only remaining drive-in theater in the state of New Jersey, the state in which they were first created in 1932 in Camden. Today New Jersey is home to one drive-in theatre, the Delsea Drive-In Theatre.
- The Palace of Depression was built by the mustachioed eccentric George Daynor, a former Alaska gold miner who lost his fortune in the Wall Street Crash of 1929; the house was known as "The Strangest House in the World" or the "Home of Junk", and was built as a testament of willpower against the effects of the Great Depression. As of March 2018, a full restoration, undertaken by The Palace of Depression Restoration Association, is ongoing.
- The Landis MarketPlace opened in 2011 as a two-level indoor public market and would go on to include several vendors on the upper level. In July 2015, the Amish vendors on the lower level departed and the market was purchased by the city the following month. As of 2016, Spataro's Pizza was the sole remaining tenant.
- The Vineland Historical and Antiquarian Society, a museum and research library that has been in operation since 1910 and holds a large collection exhibiting the city's history.
- In 2009, as much as $25 million in grants from the Economic Stimulus Act of 2008 were allocated to help with the cleanup of the Vineland Chemical Company site. The company's owners had paid $3 million towards the cleanup of soil and water at the site polluted with arsenic and other toxic materials, though the United States Environmental Protection Agency has spent more than $120 million to remediate the Superfund site.

== Media ==
The Voice Radio Network owns two locally licensed radio stations; WVLT-FM (92.1) and WVLT (1270 AM), with WPOV-LP (107.7 FM) owned by the local branch of Calvary Chapel. Vineland is also the city of license for WUVP-DT (channel 65), Philadelphia's Univision station, which has studios in Franklin Township and their news operation and transmitter based in Philadelphia proper.

== Transportation ==
=== Roads and highways ===
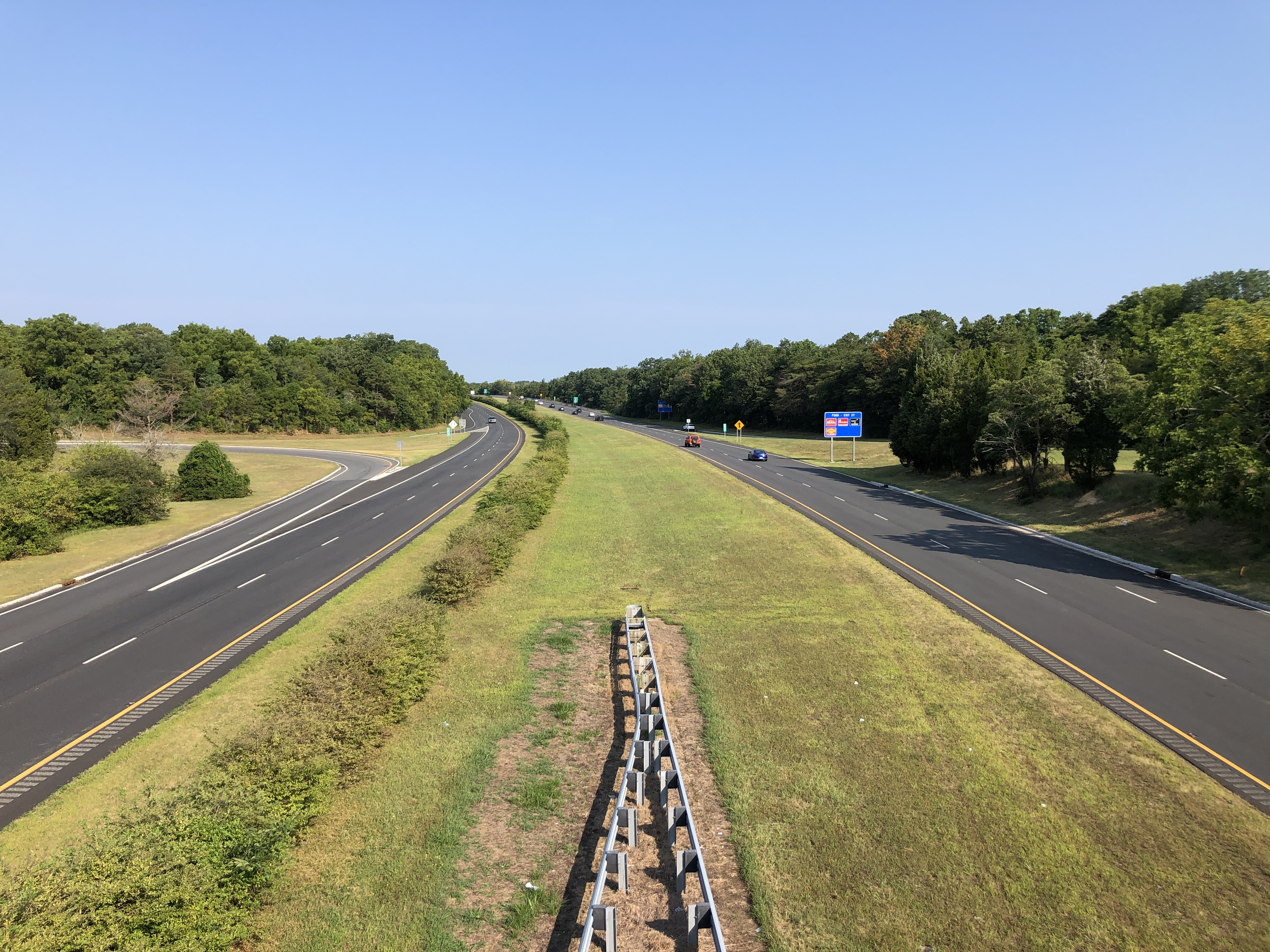
Route 55 northbound in Vineland

As of May 2010, the city had a total of 335.15 miles (539.37 km) of roadways, of which 234.73 miles (377.76 km) were maintained by the municipality, 80.54 miles (129.62 km) by Cumberland County and 19.88 miles (31.99 km) by the New Jersey Department of Transportation and 2.79 miles (4.49 km) by the New Jersey Turnpike Authority.

Route 47 (Delsea Drive) runs almost 9.5 miles (15.3 km) north-south in the western quarter of the city, connecting Millville in the south to Franklin Township in Gloucester County at the city's northern tip. Route 55 enters the city from Millville for 1.4 miles (2.3 km), heads back into Millville and re-enters Vineland, running along the western border for 8.8 miles (14.2 km) and heads north into Pittsgrove Township in Salem County. Route 56 (Landis Avenue) heads across the city from Pittsgrove Township to its eastern terminus at Route 47.

County Route 540 (Almond Road / Park Avenue / Landis Avenue) enters from the west in Pittsgrove Township and continues for 8 miles (13 km) to Buena Vista Township in Atlantic County, on the city's eastern border. County Route 552 (Sherman Avenue / Mays Landing Road) enters from Deerfield Township in the city's southwest corner and continues for 10.8 miles (17.4 km) into Maurice River Township. County Route 555 (South Main Road / North Main Road) enters from Millville extending for 8 miles (13 km) into Franklin Township.

=== Public transportation ===
NJ Transit provides bus transportation on the 313 route between Cape May and Philadelphia, on the 408 route between Millville and Philadelphia and on the 553 route between Upper Deerfield Township and Atlantic City.

Two general aviation airports are located nearby. Vineland-Downstown Airport is located 4 miles (6.4 km) northeast of the central business district and Kroelinger Airport, 3 miles (4.8 km) north.

== Parks and recreation ==
The Cumberland Cape Atlantic YMCA is in Vineland. The corporate name was changed from Vineland YMCA, as the board of directors decided to expand the organization's service area to include Atlantic and Cape May counties. There was a previous YMCA building in Millville that stopped operations in August 1990. In late 1997, Millville Housing Authority purchased the building, which opened as the Holly City Development Corp. Family Center in 2001.

== Notable people ==
People who were born in, residents of, or otherwise closely associated with Vineland include:

- Hakeem Abdul-Shaheed (born 1959), convicted drug dealer and organized crime leader
- Nelson Albano (born 1954), member of the New Jersey General Assembly who has represented the 1st Legislative District
- Nicholas Asselta (born 1951), member of the New Jersey Senate, who served on the Vineland Board of Education (1993–1996), Vineland Planning Board (1992–1993) and Vineland Environmental Commission (1992–1993)
- Johnny Austin (1910–1983), trumpeter who played with the Glenn Miller Orchestra before forming the Johnny Austin Orchestra in 1947
- Herman Bank (1916–2012), mechanical engineer at the Jet Propulsion Laboratory who oversaw the design of several early spacecraft
- Wallace M. Beakley (1903–1975), naval aviator who was a vice admiral in the United States Navy
- Obie Bermúdez (born 1977), Latin Grammy winner for Best Male Pop Vocal Album in 2005
- Jack S. Brayboy (1921–1976), football player, coach, teacher, and university administrator, all at Johnson C. Smith University
- Stanley Brotman (1924–2014), Judge of the United States District Court for the District of New Jersey
- Robert Neil Butler (1927–2010), first director of the National Institute on Aging
- Glenn Carbonara (born 1966), former professional soccer player
- Thomas Chisholm (1866–1960), Christian songwriter who wrote Great Is Thy Faithfulness
- Jennifer S. Couture, U.S. naval officer serving in the rank of rear admiral as Director, Military Personnel Plans and Policy in the office of the Chief of Naval Operations
- Jamil Demby (born 1996), offensive tackle on the practice squad of the Los Angeles Rams of the NFL
- Dick Errickson (1912–1999), pitcher who played in MLB for the Boston Bees / Braves and the Chicago Cubs
- Sam Fiocchi (born 1952), member of the New Jersey General Assembly from the 1st Legislative District from 2014 to 2016
- Annie Johnson Flint, Christian poet and hymnwriter
- Darren Ford (born 1985), MLB outfielder who played for the San Francisco Giants
- Ted Ford (born 1947), former MLB outfielder who played for the Cleveland Indians and Texas Rangers
- Chris Gheysens (born c. 1972), president and chief executive officer of Wawa Inc.
- Henry H. Goddard (1866–1957), psychologist and eugenicist and author of The Kallikak Family, who headed the Vineland Training School for Feeble-Minded Girls and Boys, where he introduced the term "moron" to describe a mild form of intellectual disability
- Jeremiah Hacker (1801–1895), Quaker reformer and journalist
- Lee Hull (born 1965), football coach and former player who was the head football coach at Morgan State University from 2014 to 2015
- Alan Kotok (1941–2006), computer scientist known for his early and significant contributions to the Internet and World Wide Web
- R. Bruce Land (born 1950), politician and former corrections officer who has represented the 1st Legislative District in the New Jersey General Assembly since 2016
- Charles K. Landis (1833–1900), founder of Vineland
- Layle Lane (1893–1976), African American educator and civil rights activist
- Miles Lerman (1920–2008), Holocaust survivor who fought as a Jewish resistance fighter during World War II in Nazi occupied Poland and helped to plan and create the United States Holocaust Memorial Museum in Washington, D.C.
- Matthew Lipman (1923–2010), founder of Philosophy for Children
- Jillian Loyden (born 1985), soccer goalkeeper
- Fred Lucas (1903–1987), MLB outfielder who played briefly for the Philadelphia Phillies during the 1935 season
- Soraida Martinez (born 1956), artist, designer and social activist known for creating the art style of Verdadism
- John Landis Mason (1832–1902), inventor of the Mason jar
- Matthew W. Milam (born 1961), politician who served in the New Jersey General Assembly from 2008 to 2013
- Liv Lux Miyake-Mugler, drag performer most known for competing on season 13 of RuPaul's Drag Race
- Don Money (born 1947), professional baseball player
- Ryan Ogren (born 1979/1980), musician who has performed as part of Over It and Runner Runner
- Isiah Pacheco (born 1999), American football running back for the Detroit Lions
- John Pascarella (born 1966), soccer coach who serves as head coach of USL Championship club OKC Energy FC
- Lou Piccone (born 1949), wide receiver and kick returner who played in the NFL for the New York Jets and Buffalo Bills, during his nine seasons in the league
- Tyreem Powell, American football linebacker for the Rutgers Scarlet Knights
- James Louis Schad (1917–2002), auxiliary bishop of the Roman Catholic Diocese of Camden from 1966 to 1993
- Jeret Schroeder (born 1969), former driver in the Indy Racing League
- Inman Sealby (1862–1942), merchant sea captain who is best known for being the last captain of the RMS Republic
- Chad Severs (born 1982), professional soccer player
- Walter H. Seward (1896–2008), supercentenarian who was, at the time of his death aged 111, the third-oldest verified man living in the United States
- Walter L. Shaw (1916–1996), telecommunications engineer and inventor who ended up supplying the Mafia with black boxes capable of making free and untraceable telephone calls
- George H. Stanger (1902–1958), politician who served in the New Jersey Senate from 1938 to 1946
- Young Steff (born 1988), R&B, Hip Hop and pop singer-songwriter
- Marc Stern, attorney, business executive and philanthropist who serves as the chairman of the TCW Group
- Muriel Streeter (1913–1995), artist known for her surrealist paintings
- Mike Testa (born 1976), attorney and politician who represents the 1st legislative district in the New Jersey Senate
- Mary Treat (1830–1923), naturalist/botanist and correspondent with Charles Darwin, who was the author of Injurious Insects of the Farm and Field (1882)
- Gina Thompson (born 1973), R&B singer whose song "The Things That You Do" peaked at number 41 on the Billboard Hot 100 charts, and number 12 on Billboard's Hot R&B/Hip-Hop Singles & Tracks Chart
- Mike Trout (born 1991), Major League Baseball outfielder was born in Vineland
- Richard Veenfliet (1843–1922), painter
- Vic Voltaggio (born 1941), Major League Baseball umpire from 1977 to 1996
- John H. Ware III (1908–1997), member of the United States House of Representatives from Pennsylvania
- Anthony Watson (born 1989), American-born skeleton racer who competed on behalf of Jamaica in the 2018 Winter Olympics, becoming the first athlete to represent the Caribbean nation in the winter sport
- Mona Weissmark, psychologist who has focused on intergenerational justice
- Thomas Bramwell Welch (1825–1903), discoverer of the pasteurization process to prevent the fermentation of grape juice
- Elmer H. Wene (1892–1957), represented New Jersey's 2nd congressional district from 1937 to 1939 and from 1941 to 1945
- Freda L. Wolfson (born 1954), District Judge for the United States District Court for the District of New Jersey
- Clarence M. York (1867–1906), attorney who served as a law clerk to the justices of the Supreme Court of the United States
