= Verdadism =

Art style

Verdadism is the word created by artist, designer and writer, Soraida Martinez, to describe her art. The word is a combination of the Spanish word for truth (Verdad) and the English suffix for theory (ism). This contemporary art style, created in 1992, juxtaposes figurative abstract paintings with written social commentaries. The technique used is mixed media, with oil or acrylic on canvas paintings with written social commentaries. The commentaries are based on the artist's personal life experiences or observations and address issues affecting American society from the late 20th century to the present. Racism, sexism, stereotyping, abortion, feminism, alienation, ethnocentrism and relationships are common themes.

== Soraida Martinez ==
An American artist of Puerto Rican heritage, Soraida Martinez was born in 1956 in Harlem, New York City to Puerto Rican parents who came to the United States during the Puerto Rican migration to New York City starting in the 1950s. The civil rights movement, feminism and the social upheavals of the late 1960s to early 1970s were instrumental in shaping the artist's socially conscious philosophy. The first Verdadism exhibition, Soraida's Verdadism: The Intellectual Voice of A Puerto Rican Woman on Canvas; Unique, Controversial Images and Style, was held in 1994 at the Walt Whitman Cultural Arts Center in Camden, New Jersey - considered one of the poorest cities in the U.S., with one of the highest crime rates.

== Elements of Verdadism ==
Verdadism consists of two distinct, integral, parts: the visual component and the written commentary. The visual style was influenced by American Abstract Expressionism, Fauvist principles, elements of Surrealism and West African sculpture. The visual components include purposeful simplification of form and structure, broad areas of flat, primary colors and geometric shapes, and abstract human figures with blocks for hands or elongated shapes for bodies. The artist's written commentaries are influenced by the tenets of Existentialist philosophy. The social commentaries are influenced by the principles of civil rights and human rights in the US, including the Feminist Movement and the social political activism of the Young Lords. These social commentaries contribute to an understanding of the Verdadism painting by describing the emotions, situations, and experiences that became the impetus for creating the work-of-art. The written commentary is an essential aspect of Verdadism and denotes a literary expression of the artist's feelings towards a particular subject matter.

== Purpose ==
The primary purpose behind the paintings is to precipitate social change, to promote an understanding of humanity and to teach tolerance and the self-empowerment of the individual. In Verdadism, the intent of the artist is to make a personal connection with the viewer through the act of involving the viewer in an actual experience in the artist's life. The viewer is encouraged to acknowledge the universality of human nature and the artist invites the viewer to open their mind to the concept that we are all human beings with shared common experiences.

== Sources ==
- Leading Ladies: Mujeres En La Literatura Hispana Y En Las Artes by Yvonne Fuentes, Margaret Parker - Published 2006 Louisiana State Press. ISBN 0-8071-3082-6
- Encyclopedia Latina: History, Culture, and Society in the United States by Ilan Stavans, Harold Augenbra - Published Grolier Academic Reference. ISBN 0-7172-5815-7
- Social Work with Latinos: A Cultural Assets Paradigm by Melvin Delgado - Published 2006 Oxford University Press. ISBN 0-19-530118-8
- Adiós, Borinquen Querida: La diáspora puertorriqueña, su historia y sus aportaciones ("ADIOS, BORINQUEN QUERIDA": THE PUERTO RICAN DIASPORA, ITS HISTORY, AND CONTRIBUTIONS") by Edna Acosta-Belén - Published 2000 CELAC. ISBN 0-615-11204-8
