= 2018 United States House of Representatives elections in New Jersey =

- November 6, 2018

All 12 New Jersey seats to the United States House of Representatives
- Turnout: 56% (▼12pp)
	Majority party	Minority party
Party	Democratic	Republican
Last election	7	5
Seats won	11	1
Seat change	▲4	▼4
Popular vote	1,856,819	1,198,691
Percentage	59.92%	38.68%
Swing	▲5.76%	▼7.16%

Democratic hold Democratic gain
Republican hold
Democratic
50–60%
60–70%
70–80%
80–90%
Republican
50–60%
60–70%

The 2018 United States House of Representatives elections in New Jersey were held on November 6, 2018, to elect the 12 U.S. representatives from the state of New Jersey, one from each of the state's 12 congressional districts. The elections coincided with other elections to the House of Representatives, elections to the United States Senate, and various state and local elections.

Democrats won four seats from Republicans and changed control from 7–5 for Democrats to 11–1 for Democrats, the fewest seats Republicans had won in the state since 1912. This was the first time since the 1912 elections that Republicans failed to hold any seat in North Jersey.

However, Representative Jeff Van Drew of the 2nd district would later change his party affiliation from Democratic to Republican in December 2019, bringing it down to 10–2. Van Drew would lose re-election in 2026

== Overview ==
=== Statewide ===
Party	Candidates	Votes		Seats		
Party	Candidates	No.	%	No.	+/–	%
Democratic	12	1,856,819	59.92	11	▲4	91.67
Republican	12	1,198,664	38.68	1	▼4	8.33
Independent	15	23,719	0.77	0	Steady	0.0
Libertarian	8	12,963	0.42	0	Steady	0.0
Constitution	1	3,902	0.13	0	Steady	0.0
Green	1	2,676	0.09	0	Steady	0.0
Total	49	3,098,743	100.0	12	Steady	100.0

Popular vote
Democratic	59.92%
Republican	38.68%
Other	1.40%

House seats
Democratic	91.67%
Republican	8.33%

=== By district ===
Results of the 2018 United States House of Representatives elections in New Jersey by district:

District	Democratic		Republican		Others		Total		Result
District	Votes	%	Votes	%	Votes	%	Votes	%	Result
District 1	169,628	64.40%	87,617	33.26%	6,173	2.34%	263,418	100.0%	Democratic hold
District 2	136,685	52.90%	116,866	45.23%	4,812	1.86%	258,363	100.0%	Democratic gain
District 3	153,473	50.01%	149,500	48.72%	3,902	1.27%	306,875	100.0%	Democratic gain
District 4	126,766	43.07%	163,065	55.40%	4,517	1.53%	294,348	100.0%	Republican hold
District 5	169,546	56.18%	128,255	42.49%	4,022	1.33%	301,823	100.0%	Democratic hold
District 6	140,752	63.63%	80,443	36.37%	0	0.00%	221,195	100.0%	Democratic hold
District 7	166,985	51.74%	150,785	46.72%	4,972	1.54%	322,742	100.0%	Democratic gain
District 8	119,881	78.12%	28,725	18.72%	4,849	3.16%	153,455	100.0%	Democratic hold
District 9	140,832	70.27%	57,854	28.87%	1,730	0.86%	200,416	100.0%	Democratic hold
District 10	175,253	87.56%	20,191	10.09%	4,715	2.36%	200,159	100.0%	Democratic hold
District 11	183,684	56.77%	136,322	42.13%	3,568	1.10%	323,574	100.0%	Democratic gain
District 12	173,334	68.68%	79,041	31.32%	0	0.00%	252,375	100.0%	Democratic hold
Total	1,856,819	59.92%	1,198,664	38.68%	43,260	1.40%	3,098,743	100.0%	

== District 1 ==
2018 New Jersey's 1st congressional district election
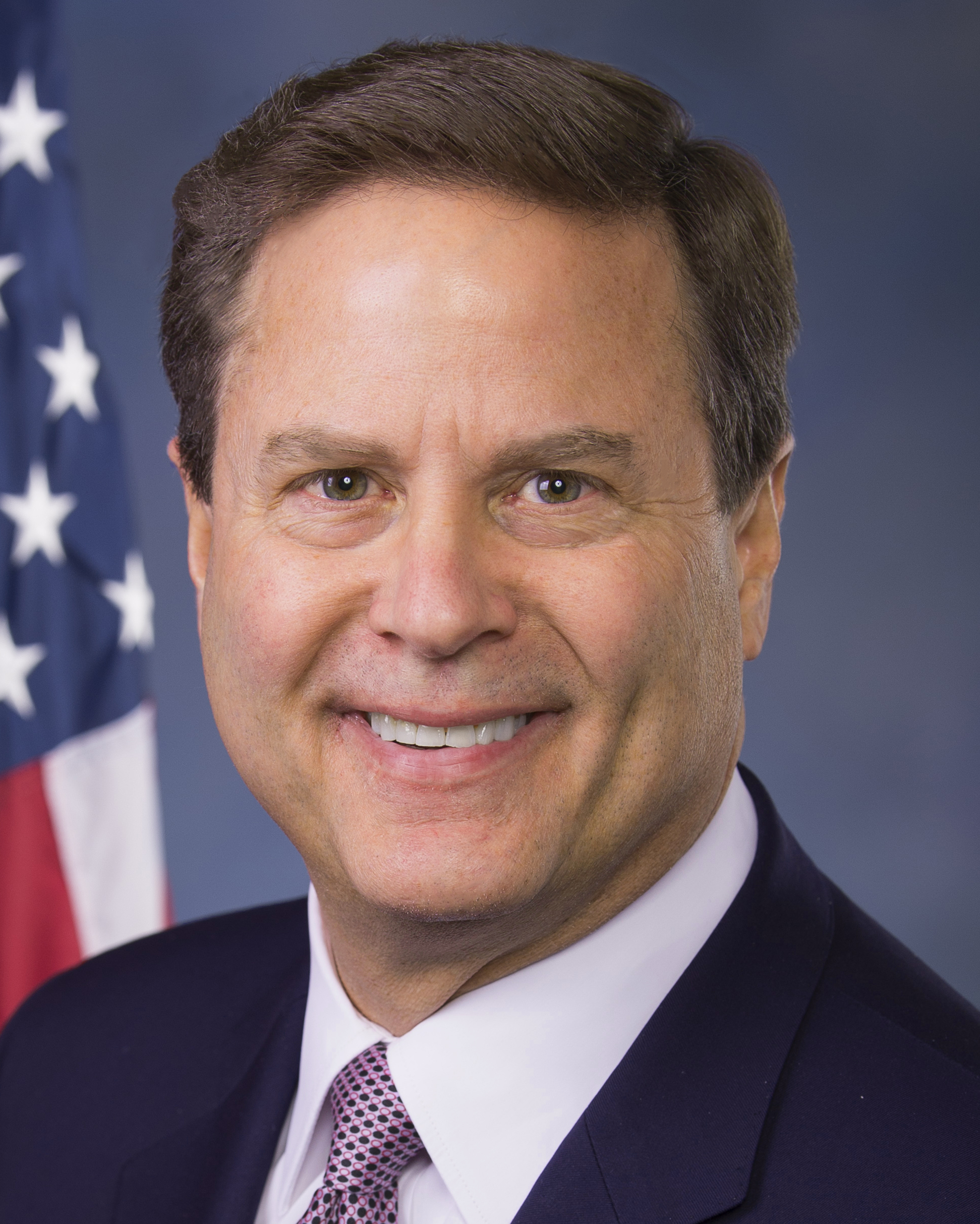

Nominee	Donald Norcross	Paul E. Dilks
Party	Democratic	Republican
Popular vote	169,628	87,617
Percentage	64.4%	33.3%
- Norcross: 40–50% 50–60% 60–70% 70–80% 80–90% >90% Dilks: 80–90% Tie: 50%
U.S. Representative before election
Donald Norcross
Democratic
Elected U.S. Representative
Donald Norcross
Democratic

The 1st district is based in South Jersey and includes most of Camden County along with parts of Burlington County and Gloucester County. Incumbent Democrat Donald Norcross, who had represented the district since 2014, ran for reelection. He was reelected with 60% of the vote in 2016. The district had a PVI of D+13.

=== Democratic primary ===
==== Candidates ====
===== Nominee =====
- Donald Norcross, incumbent U.S. Representative

===== Eliminated in primary =====
- Robert Lee Carlson
- Scot John Tomaszewski

==== Results ====
Democratic primary results
Party	Candidate	Votes	%
Democratic	Donald Norcross (incumbent)	39,788	84.1
Democratic	Robert Lee Carlson	4,570	9.7
Democratic	Scot John Tomaszewski	2,953	6.2
Total votes		47,311	100.0

=== Republican primary ===
==== Candidates ====
- Paul Dilks

==== Results ====
Republican primary results
Party	Candidate	Votes	%
Republican	Paul E. Dilks	12,363	100.0
Total votes		12,363	100.0

=== General election ===
==== Predictions ====
Source	Ranking	As of
The Cook Political Report	Safe D	November 5, 2018
Inside Elections	Safe D	November 5, 2018
Sabato's Crystal Ball	Safe D	November 5, 2018
RCP	Safe D	November 5, 2018
Daily Kos	Safe D	November 5, 2018
538	Safe D	November 7, 2018
CNN	Safe D	October 31, 2018
Politico	Safe D	November 2, 2018

==== Endorsements ====
Donald Norcross (D)

Labor unions

- AFL-CIO
- Communications Workers of America
- International Brotherhood of Boilermakers
- International Brotherhood of Electrical Workers

Organizations

- Congressional Progressive Caucus
- End Citizens United
- New Democrat Coalition

==== Results ====
New Jersey's 1st congressional district, 2018
Party	Candidate	Votes	%
Democratic	Donald Norcross (incumbent)	169,628	64.4
Republican	Paul E. Dilks	87,617	33.3
Libertarian	Robert Shapiro	2,821	1.1
Independent	Paul Hamlin	2,368	0.9
Independent	Mohammad Kabir	984	0.4
Total votes		263,418	100.0
Democratic hold			

==== By county ====
County	Donald Norcross Democratic		Paul Dilks Republican		Various candidates Other parties		Margin		Total votes cast
County	#	%	#	%	#	%	#	%	Total votes cast
Burlington (part)	5,660	62.7%	3,213	35.6%%	148	1.7%	2,447	27.1%	9,021
Camden (part)	121,634	68.2%	52,632	29.5%	4,211	2.3%	69,002	38.7%	178,477
Gloucester (part)	42,334	55.8%	31,772	41.8%	1,814	2.3%	10,562	14.0%	75,920
Totals	169,628	64.4%	87,617	33.3%	6,173	2.3%	82,011	31.1%	263,418

== District 2 ==
2018 New Jersey's 2nd congressional district election
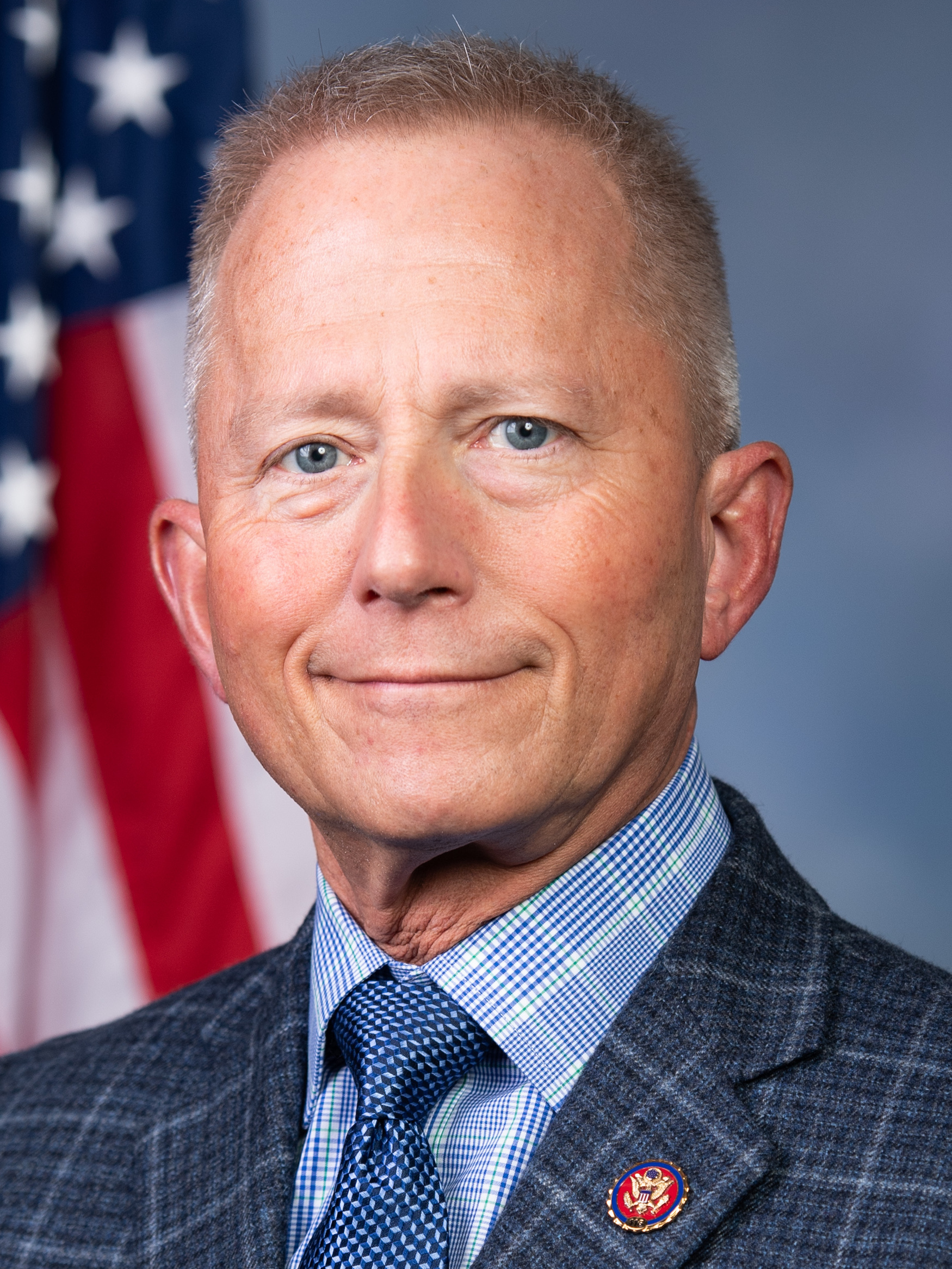

Nominee	Jeff Van Drew	Seth Grossman
Party	Democratic	Republican
Popular vote	136,685	116,866
Percentage	52.9%	45.2%
- Van Drew: 40–50% 50–60% 60–70% 70–80% 80–90% Grossman: 40–50% 50–60% 60–70%
U.S. Representative before election
Frank LoBiondo
Republican
Elected U.S. Representative
Jeff Van Drew
Democratic

The 2nd district is based in South Jersey and is the largest Congressional District in the state. It includes all of Atlantic, Cape May, Cumberland and Salem Counties and parts of Burlington, Camden, Gloucester, and Ocean counties. Incumbent Republican Frank LoBiondo, who had represented the district since 1995, announced in November 2017 that he would not run for re-election in 2018 making the 2nd an open seat. He was re-elected with 59% of the vote in 2016. The district had a PVI of R+1.

=== Republican primary ===
==== Candidates ====
===== Nominee =====
- Seth Grossman, attorney, former Atlantic County Freeholder and candidate for governor in 2013

===== Eliminated in primary =====
- Sam Fiocchi, former state assembly member
- Hirsh Singh, aerospace engineer and candidate for governor in 2017
- Robert Turkavage, former FBI agent and independent candidate for U.S. Senate in 2012

===== Withdrawn =====
- Brian T. Fitzherbert, defense contractor, project manager, engineer
- Mark McGovern, activist
- James Toto, Somers Point City Council member
- John Zarych, attorney

===== Declined =====
- Chris A. Brown, state senator
- Don Guardian, former Mayor of Atlantic City
- Frank LoBiondo, incumbent U.S. Representative
- Vincent J. Polistina, former state assembly member
- Mike Torrissi, Hammonton Town Council member

==== Endorsements ====
Sam Fiocchi

County Republican Party organizations

- Cape May County
Brian T. Fitzherbert

County Republican Party organizations

- Gloucester County
Hirsh Singh

County Republican Party organizations

- Atlantic County
- Burlington County
- Camden County
- Ocean County

State senators

- Chris A. Brown (R-2)

State Assembly members

- DiAnne Gove (R-9)
- Brian E. Rumpf (R-9)

Individuals

- Giancarlo Ghione, chair of the New Jersey Young Republican Federation
James Toto

County Republican Party organizations

- Salem County
Robert Turkavage

County Republican Party organizations

- Cumberland County

==== Results ====
Republican primary results
Party	Candidate	Votes	%
Republican	Seth Grossman	10,215	39.0
Republican	Hirsh V. Singh	7,983	30.5
Republican	Samuel Fiocchi	6,107	23.3
Republican	Robert D. Turkavage	1,854	7.1
Total votes		26,159	100

=== Democratic primary ===
This was one of 80 Republican-held House districts targeted by the Democratic Congressional Campaign Committee in 2018.

==== Candidates ====
===== Nominee =====
- Jeff Van Drew, state senator

===== Eliminated in primary =====
- William Cunningham, former aide to U.S. Senator Cory Booker
- Nathan Kleinman, farmer and activist
- Tanzie Youngblood, retired teacher

===== Withdrawn =====
- Sean Thom, school administrator

==== Endorsements ====
Jeff Van Drew

Individuals

- Bill Prady, writer and producer
Tanzie Youngblood

Organizations

- Justice Democrats

==== Results ====
Democratic primary results
Party	Candidate	Votes	%
Democratic	Jeff Van Drew	16,901	57.0
Democratic	Tanzira "Tanzie" Youngblood	5,495	18.5
Democratic	William Cunningham	4,795	16.2
Democratic	Nate Kleinman	2,467	8.3
Total votes		29,658	100

=== General election ===
==== Campaign ====
A month after the primaries, the National Republican Congressional Committee withdrew its support of Grossman, following the news that he had posted an article from the white nationalist website American Renaissance on his Facebook page stating that blacks represented "a threat to all who cross their paths, black and non-black alike." Grossman responded that he had not carefully read the article that he had posted in 2014 and did not believe its racist sentiments, although in explaining his actions he said many black teenagers are violent and dangerous. Grossman also posted comments that criticized "multi-culturalism" and "diversity".

==== Endorsements ====
Jeff Van Drew (D)

Labor unions

- AFL-CIO
- International Brotherhood of Boilermakers

Organizations

- BIPAC
- Blue Dog Coalition
- Democratic Congressional Campaign Committee "Red to Blue" Program
- End Citizens United
- New Democrat Coalition "Watch List"
- NRA Political Victory Fund

Individuals

- Bill Prady, writer and producer

==== Polling ====
Poll source	Date(s) administered	Sample size	Margin of error	Seth Grossman (R)	Jeff Van Drew (D)	Other	Undecided
Stockton University	October 17–23, 2018	597	± 4.0%	38%	55%	5%	2%
Stockton University	September 12–18, 2018	535	± 4.2%	32%	55%	5%	8%

Hypothetical polling

Poll source	Date(s) administered	Sample size	Margin of error	Generic Republican (R)	Jeff Van Drew (D)	Other	Undecided
DCCC (D)	February 12–13, 2018	–	–	39%	51%	–	–

Poll source	Date(s) administered	Sample size	Margin of error	Republican candidate	Democratic candidate	Other	Undecided
Public Policy Polling (D)	November 8–10, 2017	565	± 4.1%	39%	44%	–	17%

==== Predictions ====
Source	Ranking	As of
The Cook Political Report	Likely D (flip)	November 5, 2018
Inside Elections	Likely D (flip)	November 5, 2018
Sabato's Crystal Ball	Safe D (flip)	November 5, 2018
RCP	Likely D (flip)	November 5, 2018
Daily Kos	Safe D (flip)	November 5, 2018
538	Safe D (flip)	November 7, 2018
CNN	Safe D (flip)	October 31, 2018
Politico	Likely D (flip)	November 4, 2018

==== Results ====
New Jersey's 2nd congressional district, 2018
Party	Candidate	Votes	%
Democratic	Jeff Van Drew	136,685	52.9
Republican	Seth Grossman	116,866	45.2
Libertarian	John Ordille	1,726	0.7
Independent	Steven Fenichel	1,154	0.4
Independent	Anthony Parisi Sanchez	1,064	0.4
Independent	William Benfer	868	0.3
Majority		19,819	7.7
Total votes		258,363	100.0
Democratic gain from Republican			

==== By county ====
County	Jeff Van Drew Democratic		Seth Grossman Republican		Various candidates Other parties		Margin		Total votes cast
County	#	%	#	%	#	%	#	%	Total votes cast
Atlantic	52,917	56.4%	39,118	41.7%	1,833	1.9%	13,799	14.7%	93,868
Burlington (part)	325	37.1%	540	61.6%	12	1.4%	-215	-24.5%	877
Camden (part)	1,894	45.2%	2,201	52.6%	93	2.2%	-307	-7.4%	4,188
Cape May	21,595	52.6%	19,003	46.3%	473	1.1%	2,592	6.3%	41,071
Cumberland	23,914	59.0%	15,782	38.9%	825	2.0%	8,132	20.1%	40,521
Gloucester (part)	17,932	50.4%	16,982	47.7%	662	1.8%	950	2.7%	35,576
Ocean (part)	7,103	38.4%	11,140	60.3%	238	1.3%	-4,037	-21.9%	18,481
Salem	11,005	46.3%	12,100	50.9%	676	2.8%	-1,095	-4.6%	23,781
Totals	136,685	52.9%	116,866	45.2%	4,812	1.9%	19,819	7.0%	258,363

== District 3 ==
2018 New Jersey's 3rd congressional district election
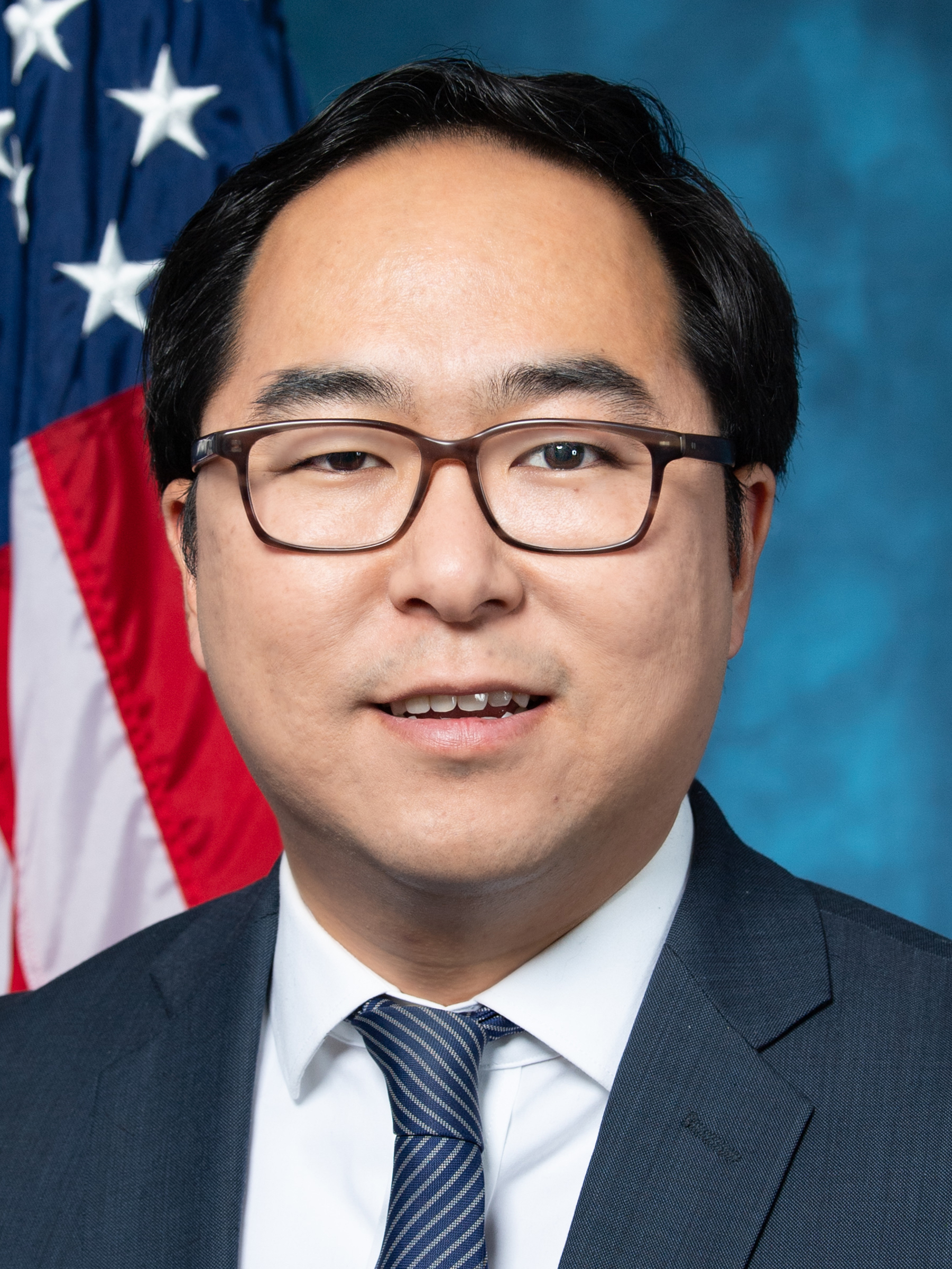

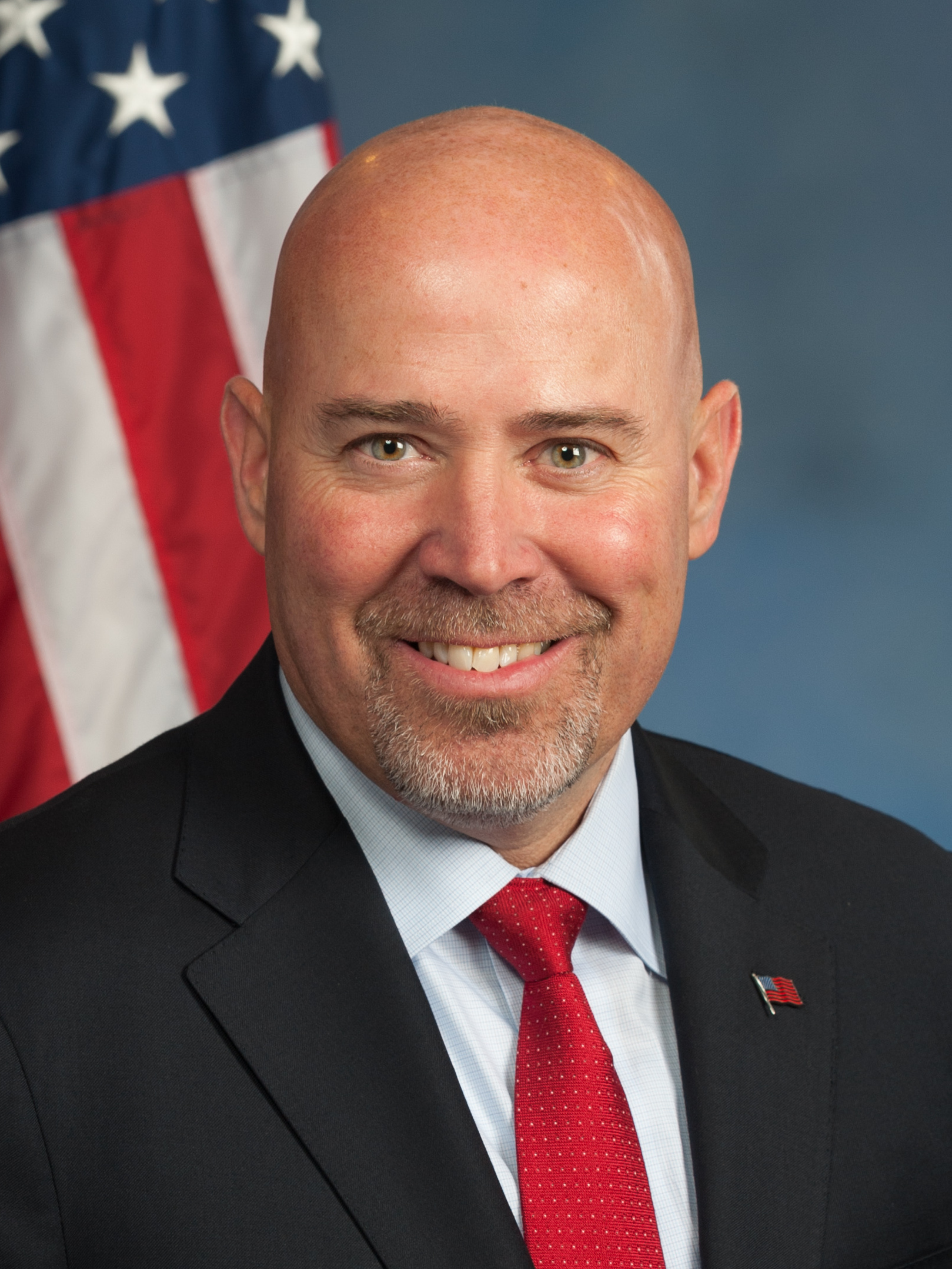
Nominee	Andy Kim	Tom MacArthur
Party	Democratic	Republican
Popular vote	153,473	149,500
Percentage	50.01%	48.72%
- Kim: 50–60% 60–70% 70–80% >90% MacArthur: 50–60% 60–70%
U.S. Representative before election
Tom MacArthur
Republican
Elected U.S. Representative
Andy Kim
Democratic

The 3rd district is based in South Jersey and includes parts of Burlington and Ocean counties. Incumbent Republican Tom MacArthur, who had represented the district since 2015, ran for re-election. He was re-elected with 59% of the vote in 2016. The district had a PVI of R+2.

=== Republican primary ===
==== Candidates ====
===== Nominee =====
- Tom MacArthur, incumbent U.S. Representative

==== Results ====
Republican primary results
Party	Candidate	Votes	%
Republican	Tom MacArthur (incumbent)	25,612	100.0
Total votes		25,612	100.0

=== Democratic primary ===
This was one of 80 Republican-held House districts targeted by the Democratic Congressional Campaign Committee in 2018.

==== Candidates ====
===== Nominee =====
- Andy Kim, former United States National Security Council official and former diplomat

===== Withdrawn =====
- Rich Dennison, attorney, funeral home director, and nominee for the state senate (LD-7) in 2007 (died on January 22, 2018)
- Katherine Hartman, attorney

===== Declined =====
- John G. Ducey, mayor of Brick
- Pamela Rosen Lampitt, state assembly member
- Betsy Ryan, president and CEO of the New Jersey Hospital Association
- Troy Singleton, state senator

==== Results ====
Democratic primary results
Party	Candidate	Votes	%
Democratic	Andy Kim	28,514	100.0
Total votes		28,514	100.0

=== General election ===
==== Endorsements ====
Tom MacArthur (R)

U.S. Executive Branch officials

- Mike Pence, 48th Vice President of the United States

Labor unions

- International Brotherhood of Boilermakers
- New Jersey Building and Construction Trades Council

Organizations

- National Republican Congressional Committee "Patriot" Program
- NRA Political Victory Fund
Andy Kim (D)

U.S. Executive Branch officials

- Barack Obama, 44th President of the United States

Statewide officials

- Phil Murphy, Governor of New Jersey

Labor unions

- AFL-CIO
- Communications Workers of America

Organizations

- Congressional Progressive Caucus
- Democratic Congressional Campaign Committee "Red to Blue" Program
- End Citizens United
- MoveOn
- Progressive Change Campaign Committee

Individuals

- Piper Perabo, actress

==== Debate ====
2018 New Jersey's 3rd congressional district debate
No.	Date	Host	Moderator	Link	Republican	Democratic
Key: P Participant A Absent N Not invited I Invited W Withdrawn						
Key: P Participant A Absent N Not invited I Invited W Withdrawn					Tom MacArthur	Andy Kim
1	Oct. 31, 2018	NJ PBS	David Cruz		P	P

==== Polling ====
Poll source	Date(s) administered	Sample size	Margin of error	Tom MacArthur (R)	Andy Kim (D)	Larry Berlinski (C)	Undecided
NYT Upshot/Siena College	October 21–25, 2018	508	± 4.8%	45%	44%	2%	9%
Monmouth University	October 18–22, 2018	363	± 5.2%	46%	48%	2%	5%
Stockton University	October 3–10, 2018	546	± 4.2%	47%	45%	7%	1%
National Research Inc. (R-MacArthur)	October 2–4, 2018	400	± 4.9%	44%	40%	–	16%
NYT Upshot/Siena College	September 22–26, 2018	499	± 4.8%	39%	49%	–	12%
DCCC (D)	September 4–5, 2018	523	± 4.3%	45%	47%	–	8%
Monmouth University	August 7–9, 2018	300 LV	± 5.7%	44%	45%	3%	9%
Monmouth University	August 7–9, 2018	401 RV	± 4.9%	41%	40%	3%	15%
Global Strategy Group (D)	June 11–21, 2018	400	± 4.9%	42%	42%	–	16%
GQR Research (D-Kim)	May 29 – June 3, 2018	550	± 4.2%	48%	44%	–	8%
Public Policy Polling (D)	April 16–17, 2018	669	± 3.8%	42%	41%	–	17%
Public Policy Polling (D)	February 14–15, 2018	336	± 5.4%	47%	43%	–	10%

==== Predictions ====
Source	Ranking	As of
The Cook Political Report	Tossup	November 5, 2018
Inside Elections	Tilt D (flip)	November 5, 2018
Sabato's Crystal Ball	Lean D (flip)	November 5, 2018
RCP	Tossup	November 5, 2018
Daily Kos	Tossup	November 5, 2018
538	Tossup	November 7, 2018
CNN	Tossup	October 31, 2018
Politico	Tossup	November 2, 2018

==== Results ====
The close result required a recount, with Kim ultimately winning by 3,973 votes.

New Jersey's 3rd congressional district, 2018
Party	Candidate	Votes	%
Democratic	Andy Kim	153,473	50.01
Republican	Tom MacArthur (incumbent)	149,500	48.72
Constitution	Larry Berlinski	3,902	1.27
Majority		3,973	1.29
Total votes		306,875	100.00
Democratic gain from Republican			

==== By county ====
County	Andy Kim Democratic		Tom MacArthur Republican		Larry Berlinski Constitution		Margin		Total votes cast
County	#	%	#	%	#	%	#	%	Total votes cast
Burlington (part)	105,909	59.4%	71,279	39.9%	1,258	0.7%	34,360	19.5%	178,446
Ocean (part)	47,564	37.0%	78,221	60.9%	2,644	2.1%	−30,657	−23.9%	128,429
Totals	153,473	50.0%	149,500	48.7%	3,902	1.3%	3,973	1.3%	206,875

== District 4 ==
2018 New Jersey's 4th congressional district election
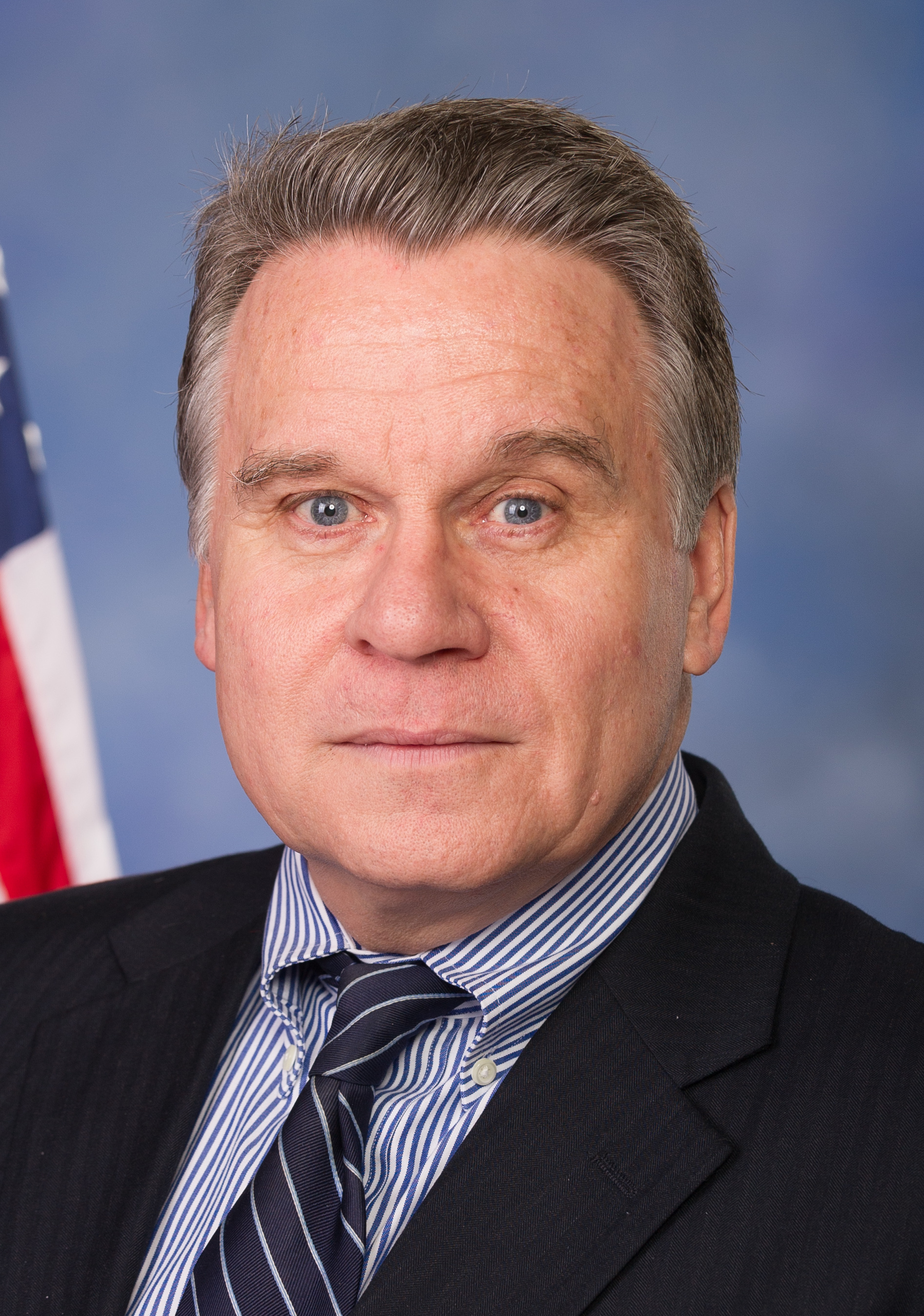

Nominee	Chris Smith	Joshua Welle
Party	Republican	Democratic
Popular vote	163,065	126,766
Percentage	55.4%	43.1%
- Smith: 50–60% 60–70% 70–80% Welle: 40–50% 50–60% 60–70%
U.S. Representative before election
Chris Smith
Republican
Elected U.S. Representative
Chris Smith
Republican

The 4th district is based in Central Jersey and includes parts of Mercer, Monmouth and Ocean counties. Incumbent Republican Chris Smith, who had represented the district since 1981, ran for re-election. He was re-elected with 64% of the vote in 2016. The district had a PVI of R+8.

=== Republican primary ===
==== Candidates ====
===== Nominee =====
- Chris Smith, incumbent U.S. Representative

==== Results ====
Republican primary results
Party	Candidate	Votes	%
Republican	Chris Smith (incumbent)	25,930	100.0
Total votes		25,930	100.0

=== Democratic primary ===
==== Candidates ====
===== Nominee =====
- Joshua Welle, Navy veteran

===== Eliminated in primary =====
- Jim Keady, former Asbury Park Council member and candidate for the 3rd district in 2016

===== Withdrawn =====
- Mike Keeling, music teacher

===== Declined =====
- Kelly Stewart Maer, party operative

==== Endorsements ====
Joshua Welle

County Democratic Party organizations

- Monmouth County
- Ocean County

==== Results ====
Democratic primary results
Party	Candidate	Votes	%
Democratic	Joshua Welle	16,905	57.1
Democratic	Jim Keady	12,682	42.9
Total votes		29,587	100.0

=== General election ===
==== Endorsements ====
Chris Smith (R)

Labor unions

- AFL-CIO
- International Brotherhood of Boilermakers

Organizations

- Campaign for Working Families
Joshua Welle (D)

Labor unions

- Communications Workers of America

Organizations

- End Citizens United
- Indivisible
- MoveOn
- VoteVets
- With Honor Fund

==== Predictions ====
Source	Ranking	As of
The Cook Political Report	Safe R	November 5, 2018
Inside Elections	Safe R	November 5, 2018
Sabato's Crystal Ball	Safe R	November 5, 2018
RCP	Safe R	November 5, 2018
Daily Kos	Safe R	November 5, 2018
538	Likely R	November 7, 2018
CNN	Safe R	October 31, 2018
Politico	Likely R	November 2, 2018

==== Results ====
Smith's showing of 55% was his lowest since 1982, when he defeated Joseph P. Merlino 53% to 47%.

New Jersey's 4th congressional district, 2018
Party	Candidate	Votes	%
Republican	Chris Smith (incumbent)	163,065	55.4
Democratic	Joshua Welle	126,766	43.1
Libertarian	Michael Rufo	1,387	0.5
Independent	Ed Stackhouse	1,064	0.4
Independent	Brian Reynolds	851	0.3
Independent	Felicia Stoler	844	0.3
Independent	Allen Yusufov	371	0.1
Majority		36,299	12.3
Total votes		294,348	100.0
Republican hold			

==== By county ====
County	Chris Smith Republican		Josh Welle Democratic		Various candidates Other parties		Margin		Total votes cast
County	#	%	#	%	#	%	#	%	Total votes cast
Mercer (part)	19,049	47.9%	19,795	49.7%	964	2.5%	-746	-1.8%	39,808
Monmouth (part)	93,491	52.3%	82,535	46.2%	2,614	2.5%	10,956	6.1%	178,640
Ocean (part)	50,525	66.6%	24,436	32.2%	939	1.2%	26,089	34.4%	75,900
Totals	163,065	55.4%	126,766	43.1%	4,517	1.5%	36,299	12.3%	194,348

== District 5 ==
2018 New Jersey's 5th congressional district election
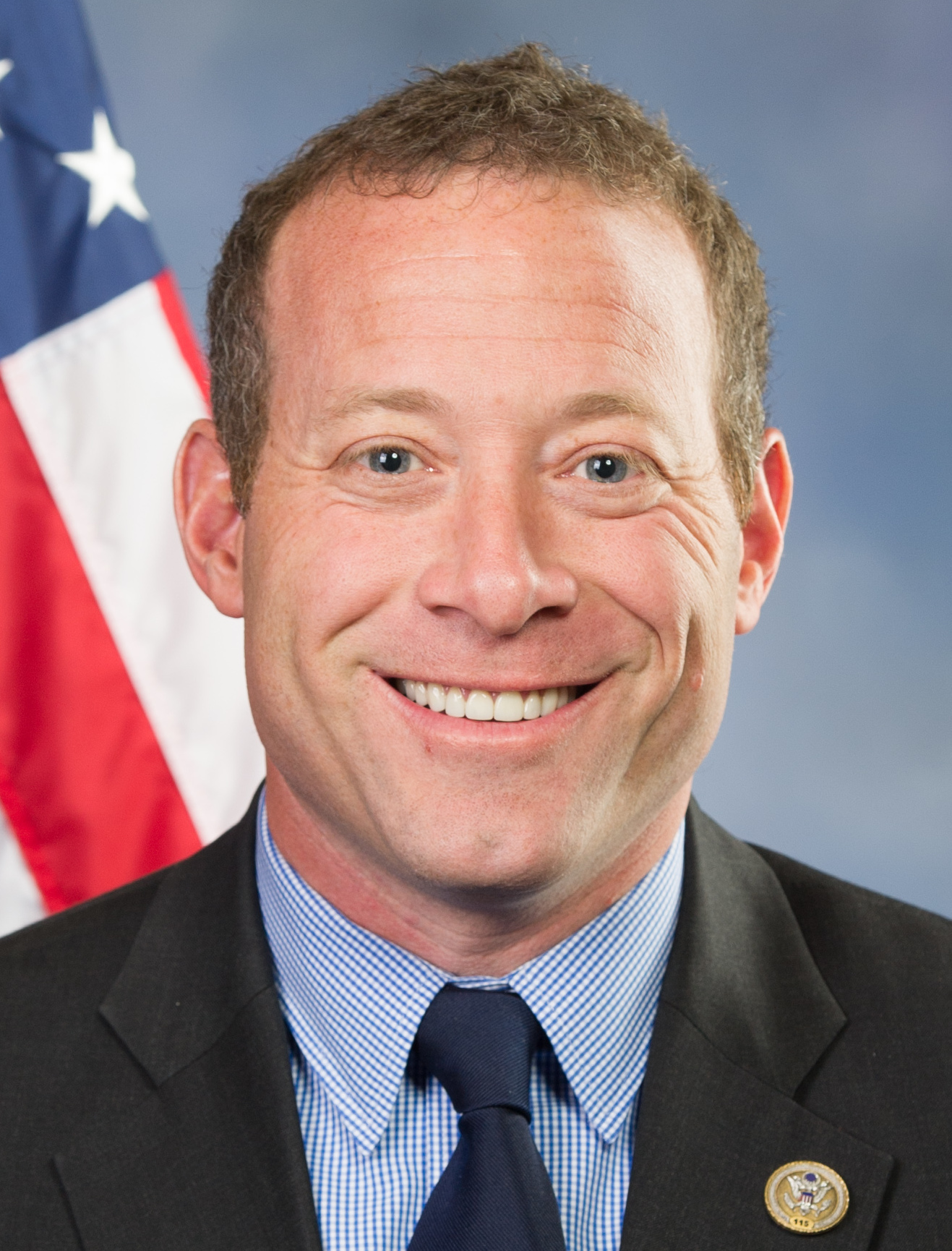

Nominee	Josh Gottheimer	John J. McCann Jr.
Party	Democratic	Republican
Popular vote	169,546	128,255
Percentage	56.2%	42.5%
- Gottheimer: 40–50% 50–60% 60–70% 70–80% 80–90% McCann: 40–50% 50–60% 60–70%
U.S. Representative before election
Josh Gottheimer
Democratic
Elected U.S. Representative
Josh Gottheimer
Democratic

The 5th district is based in North Jersey and includes parts of Bergen, Passaic, Sussex and Warren counties. Incumbent Democrat Josh Gottheimer, who had represented the district since 2017, ran for re-election. He was elected with 51% of the vote in 2016. The district had a PVI of R+3.

=== Democratic primary ===
==== Candidates ====
===== Nominee =====
- Josh Gottheimer, incumbent U.S. Representative

==== Results ====
Democratic primary results
Party	Candidate	Votes	%
Democratic	Josh Gottheimer (incumbent)	27,486	100.0
Total votes		27,486	100.0

=== Republican primary ===
==== Candidates ====
===== Nominee =====
- John McCann, attorney and former Cresskill Borough Council member

===== Eliminated in primary =====
- Steve Lonegan, former mayor of Bogota, candidate for Governor in 2005 & 2009, for the 3rd District in 2014 and nominee for the 9th District in 1998 and for Senate in 2013

===== Declined =====
- Robert Auth, state assembly member
- Lou Dobbs, conservative political commentator, author, and television host
- Michael J. Doherty, state senator
- Scott Garrett, former U.S. Representative
- Michael Ghassali, mayor of Montvale
- Steve Oroho, state senator
- Sam Raia, former mayor of Saddle River and former chair of the New Jersey Republican State Committee
- Jason Sarnoski, Warren County Freeholder
- Holly Schepisi, state assembly member
- Chuck Shotmeyer, businessman
- Parker Space, state assembly member
- Harold J. Wirths, state assembly member, former commissioner of the New Jersey Department of Labor and Workforce Development, and former Sussex County Freeholder

==== Endorsements ====
Steve Lonegan

U.S. Senators

- Ted Cruz, U.S. Senator (R-TX)
- Rand Paul, U.S. Senator (R-KY)

State senators

- Gerald Cardinale (R-39)
- Michael Doherty (R-24)
- Steve Oroho (R-24)
- Joseph Pennacchio (R-26)

State assembly members

- BettyLou DeCroce (R-26)
- John DiMaio (R-23)
- Erik Peterson (R-23)
- Holly Schepisi (R-39)
- Parker Space (R-24)
- Harold J. Wirths (R-24)

Organizations

- Republican Liberty Caucus

Local politicians

- Richard D. Gardner, Warren County freeholder
- Jason Sarnoski, Warren County freeholder
- Edward J. Smith, Warren County freeholder

Individuals

- David Bossie, president of Citizens United and deputy campaign manager of Donald Trump's 2016 presidential campaign
- Steve Forbes, editor-in-chief of Forbes and political activist
- Corey Lewandowski, political commentator and former campaign manager of Donald Trump's 2016 presidential campaign

==== Results ====
Republican primary results
Party	Candidate	Votes	%
Republican	John J. McCann Jr.	16,685	53.0
Republican	Steven M. Lonegan	14,767	47.0
Total votes		31,452	100.0

=== General election ===
==== Endorsements ====
Josh Gottheimer (D)

Labor unions

- AFL-CIO
- International Brotherhood of Boilermakers

Organizations

- Blue Dog Coalition
- Democratic Congressional Campaign Committee "Frontline" Program
- New Democrat Coalition
John McCann (R)

Statewide officials

- Jan Brewer, former governor of Arizona
- Kim Guadagno, former lieutenant governor of New Jersey

State legislators

- Robert Auth, State Assembly member, District 39
- Paul DiGaetano, former State Assembly member, District 36, former Republican Leader in the General Assembly and candidate for governor in 2005

Organizations

- National Republican Congressional Committee "On the Radar" Program
- NRA Political Victory Fund
- Students for Trump
- Stump for Trump
- Veterans for Trump

Mayors

- Jack DeLorenzo, Hasbrouck Heights
- Dierdre Dillon, Ramsey
- Mike Melfi, Hackensack (former)
- Carlos Rendo, Woodcliff Lake, nominee for lieutenant governor of New Jersey in 2017
- Ben Romeo, Cresskill
- Norman Schmelz, Bergenfield, candidate for Bergen County Executive
- Harry Shortway Jr., Midland Park
- Frank Valenzuela, Rochelle Park
- Don Winant, Dumont (former)
- Jack Zisa, Hackensack (former), chairman of the Bergen County Republican Organization

County sheriffs

- Fred Brown, Sheriff of Hunterdon County
- Shaun Golden, Sheriff of Monmouth County, Chairman of the Mommouth County Republican Organization
- Michael Mastronardy, Sheriff of Ocean County
- Chuck Miller, Sheriff of Salem County
- Bob Nolan, Sheriff of Cape May County
- Frank Provenzano, Sheriff of Somerset County
- Mike Strada, Sheriff of Sussex County

County freeholders

- John Driscoll, Bergen County Freeholder (former)
- John Felice, Bergen County Freeholder (former)
- George Graham, Sussex County Freeholder
- Robert Hermansen, Bergen County Freeholder (former), Mahwah Councilman
- Carl Lazarro, Sussex County Freeholder
- Johnathan Rose, Sussex County Freeholder

Municipal council members

- Jim Cleary, Cresskill Councilman
- Arthur Cumming, Washington Township Councilman
- Chris Di Piazza, Paramus Councilman
- Danielle DiPaola, Emerson Councilwoman
- Vincent Durante, Upper Saddle River Councilman
- Eric Kumala, Oakland Councilman, Candidate for Bergen County Freeholder
- Billy Leonard Jr, Glenn Rock Councilman
- David May, Mahwah Councilman
- Ed O'Connell, Allendale Councilman
- Hector Olmo, Cresskill Councilman, Candidate for Bergen County Freeholder
- Pat Pignatelli, Oakland Councilman
- Joe Pojanowski, Ramsey Councilman (former)
- Steve Sasso, Allendale Councilman
- George Silos, Bogota Councilman (former)
- Stephen Skellenger, Franklin Councilman
- Jim Strauch, Allendale Councilman
- Russell Talamini, Oakland Councilman
- Joe Verdone, Ramsey Councilman
- Jeanne Weber, Paramus Councilwoman

Individuals

- Ryan Fournier, national chair of Students for Trump
- Giancarlo Ghione, chair of the New Jersey Young Republican Federation
- Sebastian Gorka, Breitbart columnist and former deputy assistant to US President Donald Trump
- Harlan Z. Hill, political consultant, member of Trump Advisory Board
- Bernard Kerik, former New York City Police Commissioner
- Daryl Kipnis, attorney, candidate for congress in New Jersey's 12th congressional district
- Al Kurpis, Saddle River municipal chair
- Steven Rogers, Nutley Commissioner of Public Affairs, member of Trump Advisory Board, chairman of NJ Team Trump
- Joseph Rudy Rullo, businessman, actor, candidate for governor in 2017, candidate for US Senate in 2012
- Darrell C. Scott, pastor, co-founder of National Diversity Coalition for Trump

County Republican Party organizations

- Bergen County
- Passaic County

==== Polling ====
Poll source	Date(s) administered	Sample size	Margin of error	Josh Gottheimer (D)	John McCann (R)	Other	Undecided
McLaughlin & Associates (R-McCann)	October 12–15, 2018	400	± 4.9%	47%	38%	9%	7%
Tel Opinion Research (R-McCann)	August 9–12, 2018	400	± 4.9%	36%	39%	–	25%

==== Predictions ====
Source	Ranking	As of
The Cook Political Report	Likely D	November 5, 2018
Inside Elections	Safe D	November 5, 2018
Sabato's Crystal Ball	Likely D	November 5, 2018
RCP	Likely D	November 5, 2018
Daily Kos	Likely D	November 5, 2018
538	Safe D	November 7, 2018
CNN	Safe D	October 31, 2018
Politico	Likely D	November 2, 2018

==== Results ====
New Jersey's 5th congressional district, 2018
Party	Candidate	Votes	%
Democratic	Josh Gottheimer (incumbent)	169,546	56.2
Republican	John J. McCann	128,255	42.5
Libertarian	James Tosone	2,115	0.7
Independent	Wendy Goetz	1,907	0.6
Majority		41,291	13.7
Total votes		301,823	100.0
Democratic hold			

==== By county ====
County	Josh Gottheimer Democratic		John McCann Republican		Various candidates Other parties		Margin		Total votes cast
County	#	%	#	%	#	%	#	%	Total votes cast
Bergen (part)	133,894	61.1%	82,869	37.8%	2,410	1.1%	51,025	23.3%	219,173
Passaic (part)	7,229	45.4%	8,487	53.4%	191	1.2%	−1,258	−8.0%	15,907
Sussex (part)	17,171	43.0%	21,946	54.9%	855	2.2%	−4,775	−11.9%	39,972
Warren (part)	11,252	42.0%	14,953	55.9%	566	2.1%	−3,701	−13.9%	26,771
Totals	169,546	56.2%	128,255	42.5%	4,022	1.3%	41,291	14.0%	301,823

== District 6 ==
2018 New Jersey's 6th congressional district election
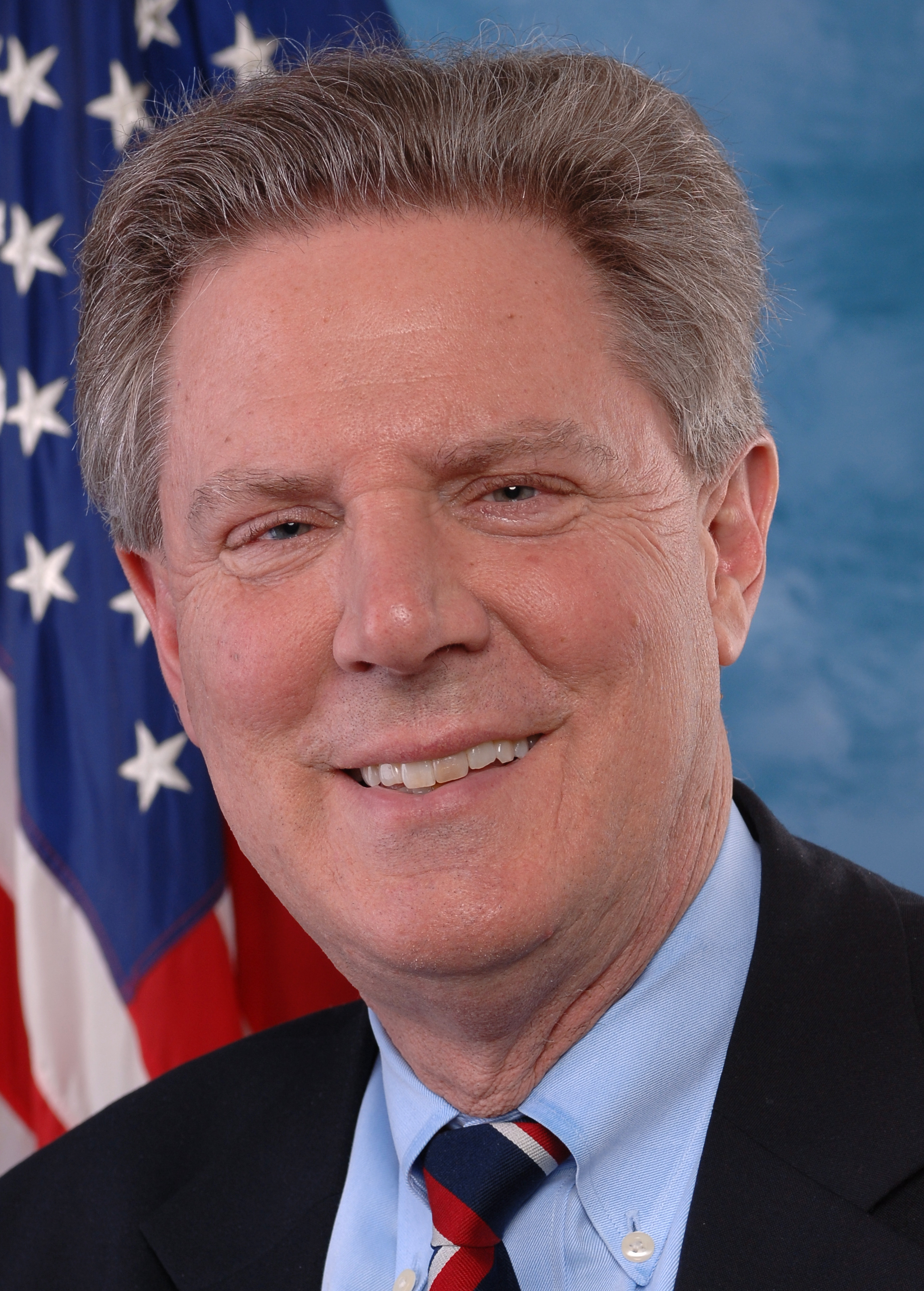

Nominee	Frank Pallone	Richard J. Pezzullo
Party	Democratic	Republican
Popular vote	140,752	80,443
Percentage	63.6%	36.4%
- Pallone: 50–60% 60–70% 70–80% 80–90% Pezzullo: 50–60%
U.S. Representative before election
Frank Pallone
Democratic
Elected U.S. Representative
Frank Pallone
Democratic

The 6th district is based in Central Jersey and includes parts of Middlesex and Monmouth counties. Incumbent Democrat Frank Pallone, who had represented the district since 1988, ran for re-election. He was re-elected with 64% of the vote in 2016. The district had a PVI of D+9.

=== Democratic primary ===
==== Candidates ====
===== Nominee =====
- Frank Pallone, incumbent U.S. Representative

===== Eliminated in primary =====
- Javahn Walker

==== Results ====
Democratic primary results
Party	Candidate	Votes	%
Democratic	Frank Pallone Jr. (incumbent)	23,621	86.2
Democratic	Javahn Walker	3,770	13.8
Total votes		27,391	100.0

=== Republican primary ===
==== Candidates ====
===== Nominee =====
- Richard Pezzullo, businessman and candidate for Senate in 2014

==== Results ====
Republican primary results
Party	Candidate	Votes	%
Republican	Richard J. Pezzullo	9,827	100.0
Total votes		9,827	100.0

=== General election ===
==== Predictions ====
Source	Ranking	As of
The Cook Political Report	Safe D	November 5, 2018
Inside Elections	Safe D	November 5, 2018
Sabato's Crystal Ball	Safe D	November 5, 2018
RCP	Safe D	November 5, 2018
Daily Kos	Safe D	November 5, 2018
538	Safe D	November 7, 2018
CNN	Safe D	October 31, 2018
Politico	Safe D	November 4, 2018

==== Endorsements ====
Frank Pallone (D)

Labor unions

- AFL-CIO
- Communications Workers of America
- International Brotherhood of Boilermakers

Organizations

- Congressional Progressive Caucus

==== Results ====
New Jersey's 6th congressional district, 2018
Party	Candidate	Votes	%
Democratic	Frank Pallone Jr. (incumbent)	140,752	63.6
Republican	Richard J. Pezzullo	80,443	36.4
Total votes		221,195	100.0
Democratic hold			

==== By county ====
County	Frank Pallone Democratic		Richard Pezzullo Republican		Margin		Total votes cast
County	#	%	#	%	#	%	Total votes cast
Middlesex (part)	96,347	68.7%	43,871	31.3%	52,476	37.4%	140,218
Monmouth (part)	44,405	54.8%	36,572	45.2%	7,833	9.6%	80,977
Totals	140,752	63.6%	80,443	36.4%	60,309	23.2%	221,195

== District 7 ==
2018 New Jersey's 7th congressional district election
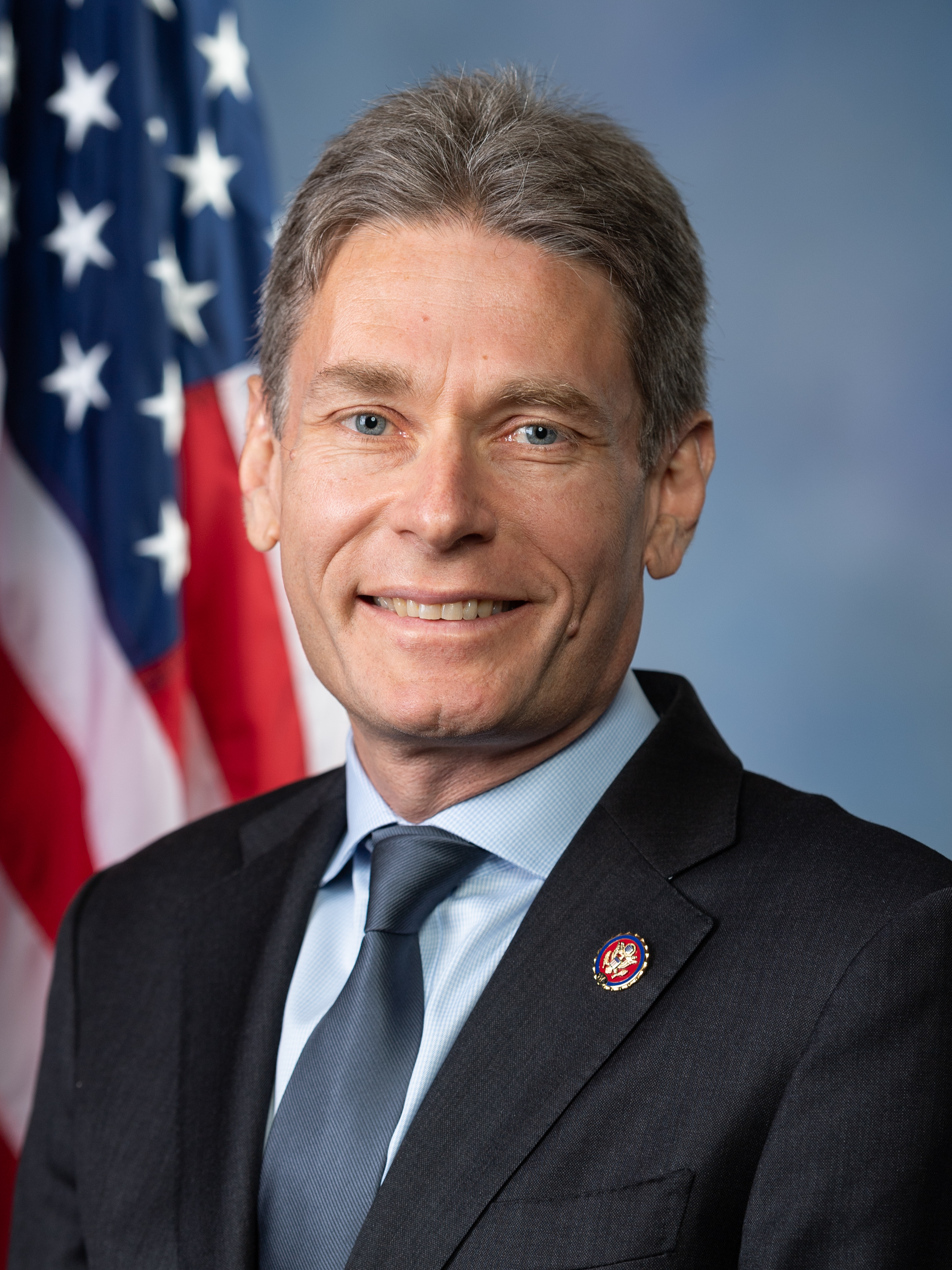

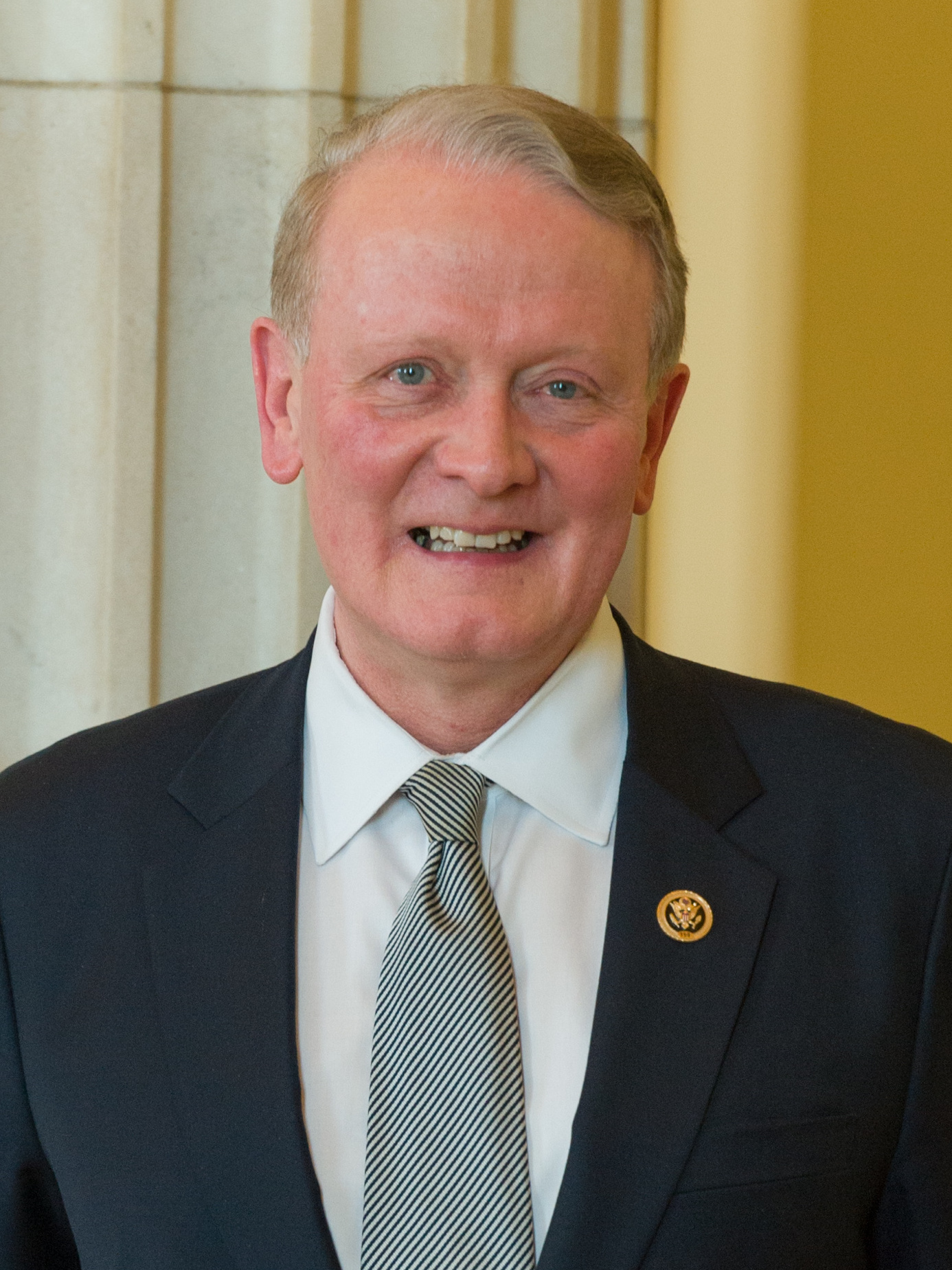
Nominee	Tom Malinowski	Leonard Lance
Party	Democratic	Republican
Popular vote	166,985	150,785
Percentage	51.7%	46.7%
- Malinowski: 40–50% 50–60% 60–70% 70–80% Lance: 40–50% 50–60% 60–70%
U.S. Representative before election
Leonard Lance
Republican
Elected U.S. Representative
Tom Malinowski
Democratic

The 7th district includes all of Hunterdon County, and parts of Essex, Morris, Somerset, Union, and Warren Counties. Incumbent Republican Leonard Lance, who had represented the district since 2009, ran for re-election. He was re-elected with 54% of the vote in 2016. The district had a PVI of R+3.

=== Republican primary ===
==== Candidates ====
===== Nominee =====
- Leonard Lance, incumbent U.S. Representative

===== Eliminated in primary =====
- Lindsay Brown, web developer

===== Declined =====
- Rosemary Becchi, attorney
- Craig Heard, marketing consultant and candidate for this seat in 2016

==== Results ====
Republican primary results
Party	Candidate	Votes	%
Republican	Leonard Lance (incumbent)	24,934	74.9
Republican	Lindsay C. Brown	4,795	14.4
Republican	Raafat Barsoom	3,556	10.7
Total votes		33,285	100

=== Democratic primary ===
This was one of 80 Republican-held House districts targeted by the Democratic Congressional Campaign Committee in 2018.

Three Democrats were on the Democratic primary ballot. They included former Assistant Secretary of State for Democracy, Human Rights, and Labor Tom Malinowski; lawyer Goutam Jois; and social worker Peter Jacob. Green Party of New Jersey member Diane Moxley also announced her intent to run for the seat. Westfield teacher and attorney Lisa Mandelblatt withdrew in February 2017, as did Scotch Plains lawyer Scott Salmon. The Democratic County Parties in New Jersey's 7th District unanimously threw their support to Malinowski, and he received the county line for the June 5 primary in all counties.

==== Candidates ====
===== Nominee =====
- Tom Malinowski, former Assistant Secretary of State for Democracy, Human Rights, and Labor

===== Eliminated in primary =====
- Peter Jacob, social worker and nominee in 2016
- Goutam Jois, attorney

===== Withdrawn =====
- Lisa Mandelblatt, teacher and attorney (withdrew February 2018, endorsed Malinowski)
- David Pringle, environmental activist
- Scott Salmon, attorney (withdrew February 2018, endorsed Malinowski)
- Linda Weber, bank executive

===== Declined =====
- Christine Lui Chen, neuroscientist, healthcare executive and nominee for state senate (LD-23) in 2017
- Zenon Christodoulou, businessman and vice chair of the Somerset County Democratic Party
- Bill Knox, wealth management specialist
- Colleen Mahr, mayor of Fanwood
- Keiona Miller, North Plainfield Borough Council member
- Kurt Perhach, teacher and Army prosecutor

==== Endorsements ====
Peter Jacob

Organizations

- Brand New Congress
- Justice Democrats
Tom Malinowski

County Democratic Party organizations

- Essex County
- Hunterdon County
- Morris County
- Somerset County
- Union County
- Warren County

Individuals

- Lisa Mandelblatt, teacher, attorney, and former candidate for this seat

==== Results ====
Malinowski won the Democratic nomination in the June primary.

Democratic primary results
Party	Candidate	Votes	%
Democratic	Tom Malinowski	26,172	66.8
Democratic	Peter Jacob	7,503	19.1
Democratic	Goutam Jois	5,507	14.1
Total votes		39,182	100

=== General election ===
==== Endorsements ====
Leonard Lance (R)

Labor unions

- International Brotherhood of Boilermakers

Organizations

- BIPAC
Tom Malinowski (D)

U.S. Executive Branch officials

- Barack Obama, 44th President of the United States

Labor unions

- AFL-CIO
- Communications Workers of America

Organizations

- Democratic Congressional Campaign Committee "Red to Blue" Program
- End Citizens United
- Indivisible
- MoveOn
- New Democrat Coalition

Statewide officials

- Phil Murphy, governor of New Jersey

==== Debate ====
2018 New Jersey's 7th congressional district debate
No.	Date	Host	Moderator	Link	Republican	Democratic
Key: P Participant A Absent N Not invited I Invited W Withdrawn						
Key: P Participant A Absent N Not invited I Invited W Withdrawn					Leonard Lance	Tom Malinowski
1	Oct. 17, 2018	NJTV	Briana Vannozzi		P	P

==== Polling ====
Poll source	Date(s) administered	Sample size	Margin of error	Leonard Lance (R)	Tom Malinowski (D)	Other	Undecided
NYT Upshot/Siena College	October 28–31, 2018	503	± 4.6%	39%	47%	1%	12%
Monmouth University	October 25–29, 2018	356	± 5.2%	44%	47%	2%	6%
NYT Upshot/Siena College	September 17–21, 2018	504	± 4.8%	45%	44%	–	10%
Monmouth University	September 13–17, 2018	365 LV	± 5.1%	43%	46%	2%	9%
Monmouth University	September 13–17, 2018	414 RV	± 4.8%	39%	47%	2%	12%
GQR Research (D-Malinowski)	June 20–25, 2018	500	± 4.4%	45%	47%	–	7%

Hypothetical polling

Poll source	Date(s) administered	Sample size	Margin of error	Leonard Lance (R)	Democratic candidate (D)	Other	Undecided
Public Policy Polling (D)	November 8–9, 2017	528	± 4.3%	41%	42%	–	17%

==== Predictions ====
Source	Ranking	As of
The Cook Political Report	Tossup	November 5, 2018
Inside Elections	Tossup	November 5, 2018
Sabato's Crystal Ball	Lean D (flip)	November 5, 2018
RCP	Lean D (flip)	November 5, 2018
Daily Kos	Tossup	November 5, 2018
538	Likely D (flip)	November 7, 2018
CNN	Tossup	October 31, 2018
Politico	Tossup	November 2, 2018

==== Results ====
New Jersey's 7th congressional district, 2018
Party	Candidate	Votes	%
Democratic	Tom Malinowski	166,985	51.7
Republican	Leonard Lance (incumbent)	150,785	46.7
Green	Diane Moxley	2,676	0.8
Independent	Gregg Mele	2,296	0.7
Majority		16,200	5.0
Total votes		322,742	100.0
Democratic gain from Republican			

==== By county ====
County	Tom Malinowski Democratic		Leonard Lance Republican		Various candidates Other parties		Margin		Total votes cast
County	#	%	#	%	#	%	#	%	Total votes cast
Essex (part)	6,239	69.0%	2,736	30.3%	62	0.7%	3,503	38.7%	9,037
Hunterdon	28,047	44.3%	34,017	53.8%	1,221	1.9%	-5,970	-9.5%	63,285
Morris (part)	23,103	47.1%	25,263	51.5%	728	1.5%	-2,160	-4.4%	49,094
Somerset (part)	55,478	53.5%	46,720	45.0%	1,578	1.6%	8,758	8.5%	103,776
Union (part)	48,217	57.5%	34,650	41.3%	1,061	1.2%	13,567	16.2%	83,928
Warren (part)	5,901	43.3%	7,399	54.3%	322	2.3%	-1,498	-11.0%	13,622
Totals	166,985	51.7%	150,785	46.7%	4,972	1.5%	16,200	5.0%	322,742

== District 8 ==
2018 New Jersey's 8th congressional district election
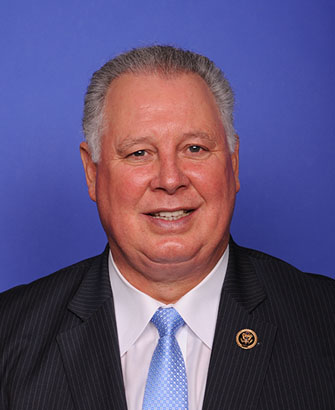

Nominee	Albio Sires	John R. Muniz
Party	Democratic	Republican
Popular vote	119,881	28,725
Percentage	78.1%	18.7%
- Sires: 60–70% 70–80% 80–90%
U.S. Representative before election
Albio Sires
Democratic
Elected U.S. Representative
Albio Sires
Democratic

The 8th district is based in North Jersey and includes parts of Bergen, Essex, Hudson and Union counties. Incumbent Democrat Albio Sires, who had represented the district since 2006, ran for re-election. He was re-elected with 77% of the vote in 2016. The district had a PVI of D+27.

=== Democratic primary ===
==== Candidates ====
===== Nominee =====
- Albio Sires, incumbent U.S. Representative

==== Results ====
Democratic primary results
Party	Candidate	Votes	%
Democratic	Albio Sires (incumbent)	31,583	100.0
Total votes		31,583	100.0

=== Republican primary ===
==== Candidates ====
===== Nominee =====
- John Muniz

==== Results ====
Republican primary results
Party	Candidate	Votes	%
Republican	John R. Muniz	3,052	100.0
Total votes		3,052	100.0

=== General election ===
==== Predictions ====
Source	Ranking	As of
The Cook Political Report	Safe D	November 5, 2018
Inside Elections	Safe D	November 5, 2018
Sabato's Crystal Ball	Safe D	November 5, 2018
RCP	Safe D	November 5, 2018
Daily Kos	Safe D	November 5, 2018
538	Safe D	November 7, 2018
CNN	Safe D	October 31, 2018
Politico	Safe D	November 4, 2018

==== Endorsements ====
Albio Sires (D)

Labor unions

- AFL-CIO
- Communications Workers of America
- International Brotherhood of Boilermakers

==== Results ====
New Jersey's 8th congressional district, 2018
Party	Candidate	Votes	%
Democratic	Albio Sires (incumbent)	119,881	78.1
Republican	John R. Muniz	28,752	18.7
Independent	Mahmoud Mahmoud	3,658	2.4
Libertarian	Dan Delaney	1,191	0.8
Total votes		153,455	100.0
Democratic hold			

==== By county ====
County	Albio Sires Democratic		John Muniz Republican		Various candidates Other parties		Margin		Total votes cast
County	#	%	#	%	#	%	#	%	Total votes cast
Bergen (part)	1,723	71.6%	604	25.1%	79	3.2%	1,119	46.5%	2,406
Essex (part)	20,977	78.3%	5,148	19.2%	678	2.6%	15,829	59.1%	26,803
Hudson (part)	80,789	77.9%	19,281	18.6%	3,662	3.6%	61,508	59.3%	103,732
Union (part)	16,392	79.9%	3,692	18.0%	430	2.1%	12,700	61.9%	20,514
Totals	119,881	78.1%	28,725	18.7%	4,849	3.2%	91,156	59.4%	153,455

== District 9 ==
2018 New Jersey's 9th congressional district election
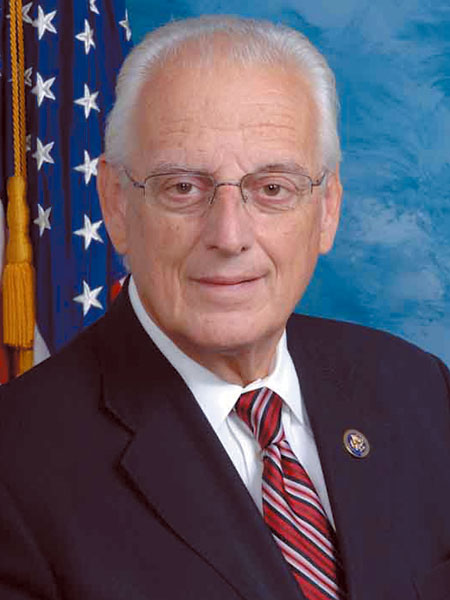

Nominee	Bill Pascrell	Eric P. Fisher
Party	Democratic	Republican
Popular vote	140,832	57,854
Percentage	70.3%	28.9%
- Pascrell: 50–60% 60–70% 70–80% 80–90% >90% Tie: 50%
U.S. Representative before election
Bill Pascrell
Democratic
Elected U.S. Representative
Bill Pascrell
Democratic

The 9th district is based in North Jersey and includes parts of Bergen, Hudson and Passaic counties. Incumbent Democrat Bill Pascrell, who had represented the district since 1997, ran for re-election. He was re-elected with 70% of the vote in 2016. The district had a PVI of D+16.

=== Democratic primary ===
==== Candidates ====
===== Nominee =====
- Bill Pascrell Jr., incumbent U.S. Representative

===== Eliminated in primary =====
- William Henry

==== Results ====
Democratic primary results
Party	Candidate	Votes	%
Democratic	Bill Pascrell Jr. (incumbent)	23,365	85.7
Democratic	William O. Henry	3,911	14.3
Total votes		27,276	100.0

=== Republican primary ===
==== Candidates ====
===== Nominee =====
- Eric Fisher

==== Results ====
Republican primary results
Party	Candidate	Votes	%
Republican	Eric P. Fisher	5,142	100.0
Total votes		5,142	100.0

=== General election ===
==== Predictions ====
Source	Ranking	As of
The Cook Political Report	Safe D	November 5, 2018
Inside Elections	Safe D	November 5, 2018
Sabato's Crystal Ball	Safe D	November 5, 2018
RCP	Safe D	November 5, 2018
Daily Kos	Safe D	November 5, 2018
538	Safe D	November 7, 2018
CNN	Safe D	October 31, 2018
Politico	Safe D	November 4, 2018

==== Endorsements ====
Bill Pascrell (D)

Labor unions

- AFL-CIO
- Communications Workers of America
- International Brotherhood of Boilermakers

Organizations

- Brady Campaign

==== Results ====
New Jersey's 9th congressional district, 2018
Party	Candidate	Votes	%
Democratic	Bill Pascrell Jr. (incumbent)	140,832	70.3
Republican	Eric P. Fisher	57,854	28.9
Libertarian	Claudio Belusic	1,730	0.9
Total votes		200,416	100.0
Democratic hold			

==== By county ====
County	Bill Pascrell Democratic		Eric Fisher Republican		Claudio Belusic Libertarian		Margin		Total votes cast
County	#	%	#	%	#	%	#	%	Total votes cast
Bergen (part)	74,915	65.6%	38,106	33.4%	1,208	1.1%	36,809	32.2%	114,229
Hudson (part)	6,355	65.9%	3,216	33.3%	77	0.8%	3,139	32.6%	9,648
Passaic (part)	59,962	77.8%	16,532	21.6%	445	0.6%	43,030	56.2%	76,539
Totals	140,832	70.3%	57,854	28.9%	1,730	0.9%	82,978	41.4%	200,416

== District 10 ==
2018 New Jersey's 10th congressional district election
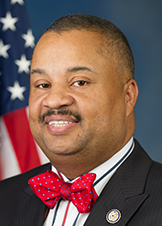

Nominee	Donald Payne Jr.	Agha Khan
Party	Democratic	Republican
Popular vote	175,253	20,191
Percentage	87.6%	10.1%
- Payne: 60–70% 70–80% 80–90% >90%
U.S. Representative before election
Donald Payne Jr.
Democratic
Elected U.S. Representative
Donald Payne Jr.
Democratic

The 10th district is based in North Jersey and includes parts of Essex, Hudson and Union counties. Incumbent Democrat Donald Payne Jr., who had represented the district since 2012, ran for re-election. He was re-elected with 86% of the vote in 2016. The district had a PVI of D+36.

=== Democratic primary ===
==== Candidates ====
===== Nominee =====
- Donald Payne Jr., incumbent U.S. Representative

===== Eliminated in primary =====
- Aaron Fraser

==== Results ====
Democratic primary results
Party	Candidate	Votes	%
Democratic	Donald M. Payne Jr. (incumbent)	38,206	91.7
Democratic	Aaron Walter Fraser	3,442	8.3
Total votes		41,648	100

=== Republican primary ===
==== Candidates ====
===== Nominee =====
- Agha Khan

==== Results ====
Republican primary results
Party	Candidate	Votes	%
Republican	Agha Khan	2,292	100.0
Total votes		2,292	100.0

=== General election ===
==== Predictions ====
Source	Ranking	As of
The Cook Political Report	Safe D	November 5, 2018
Inside Elections	Safe D	November 5, 2018
Sabato's Crystal Ball	Safe D	November 5, 2018
RCP	Safe D	November 5, 2018
Daily Kos	Safe D	November 5, 2018
538	Safe D	November 7, 2018
CNN	Safe D	October 31, 2018
Politico	Safe D	November 4, 2018

==== Endorsements ====
Donald Payne Jr. (D)

Labor unions

- AFL-CIO
- Communications Workers of America
- International Brotherhood of Boilermakers

==== Results ====
New Jersey's 10th congressional district, 2018
Party	Candidate	Votes	%
Democratic	Donald M. Payne Jr. (incumbent)	175,253	87.6
Republican	Agha Khan	20,191	10.1
Independent	Cynthia Johnson	2,070	1.0
Independent	Joanne Miller	2,038	1.0
Libertarian	Scott DiRoma	607	0.3
Total votes		200,159	100.0

==== By county ====
County	Donald Payne Jr. Democratic		Agha Khan Republican		Various candidates Other parties		Margin		Total votes cast
County	#	%	#	%	#	%	#	%	Total votes cast
Essex (part)	112,372	92.5%	6,983	5.7%	2,165	1.7%	105,389	86.8%	121,520
Hudson (part)	25,851	80.7%	4,709	14.7%	1,461	4.5%	21,142	66.0%	32,021
Union (part)	37,030	79.4%	8,499	18.2%	1,089	2.3%	28,531	61.2%	46,618
Totals	175,253	87.6%	20,191	10.1%	4,715	2.4%	155,062	77.5%	200,159

== District 11 ==
2018 New Jersey's 11th congressional district election
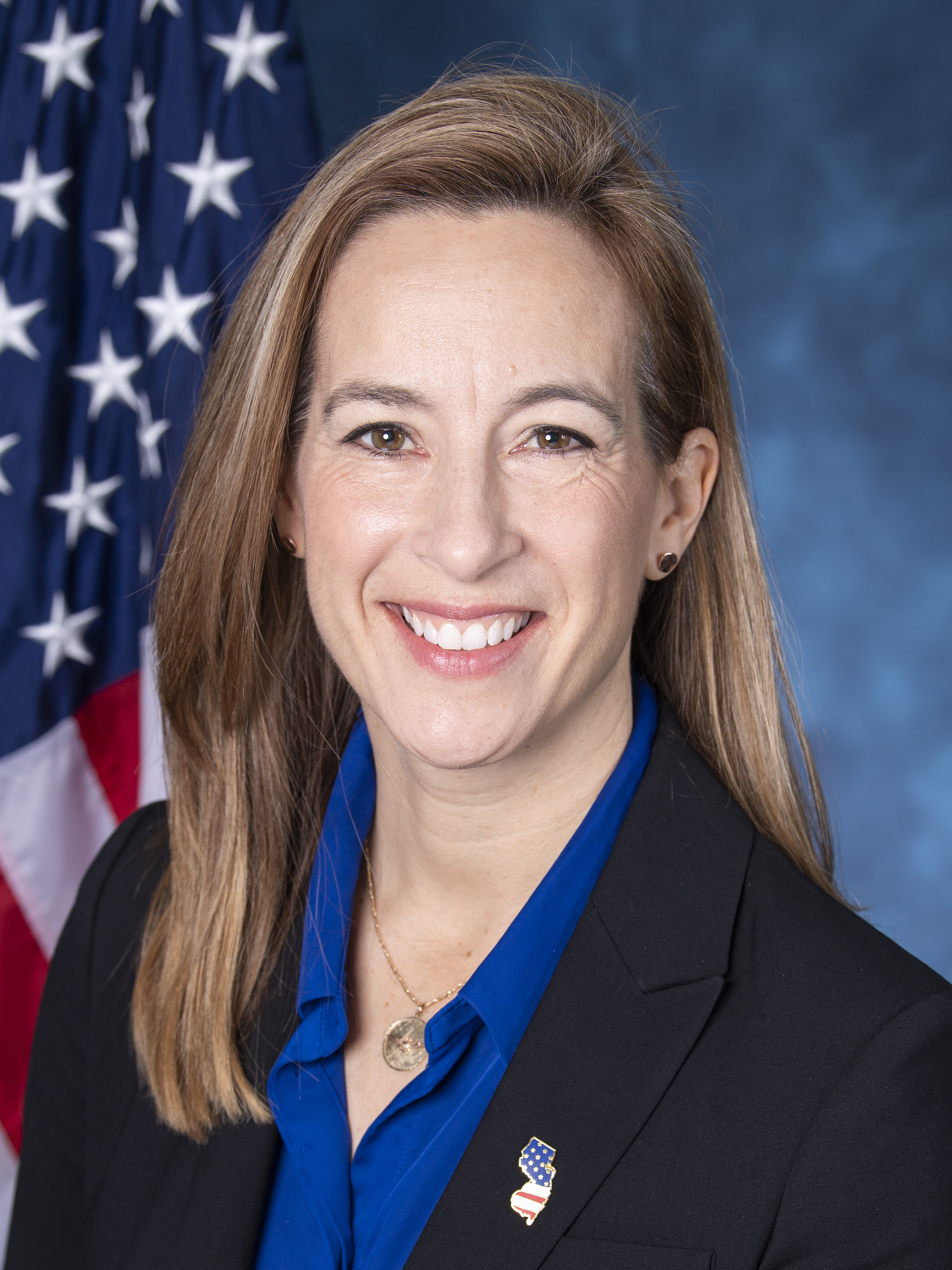

Nominee	Mikie Sherrill	Jay Webber
Party	Democratic	Republican
Popular vote	183,684	136,322
Percentage	56.8%	42.1%
- Sherrill: 50–60% 60–70% 70–80% 80–90% Webber: 40–50% 50–60% 60–70%
U.S. Representative before election
Rodney Frelinghuysen
Republican
Elected U.S. Representative
Mikie Sherrill
Democratic

The 11th district is based in North Jersey and includes parts of Essex, Morris, Passaic and Sussex counties. Incumbent Republican Rodney Frelinghuysen, who had represented the district since 1995, announced in January 2018 that he will not seek re-election. He was re-elected with 58% of the vote in 2016. The district had a PVI of R+3.

=== Republican primary ===
==== Candidates ====
===== Nominee =====
- Jay Webber, state assembly member and former chair of the New Jersey Republican State Committee

===== Eliminated in primary =====
- Peter De Neufville, former executive chairman of Voltaix, Inc.
- Antony Ghee, JAG officer, investment banker, and attorney
- Martin Hewitt, attorney
- Patrick S Allocco, concert promoter and political campaign operative

===== Declined =====
- Kate Whitman Annis, daughter of former governor Christine Todd Whitman and candidate for the 7th district in 2008
- Rosemary Becchi, attorney and former U.S. Senate Finance Committee staff member
- Justin Bozonelis, investment banker
- Tony Bucco, state assembly member (endorsed Jay Webber)
- Joe Caruso, businessman
- Kristin Corrado, state senator (endorsed Antony Ghee)
- BettyLou DeCroce, state assembly assembly member (endorsed Antony Ghee)
- Rodney Frelinghuysen, incumbent U.S. Representative
- Jim Gannon, Morris County Sheriff
- Jerry Langer, trucking company executive
- Nick Mangold, former Jets center
- Tom Mastrangelo, Morris County Freeholder
- Paul Miller, car dealer
- Christine Myers, Morris County Freeholder
- Kevin J. O'Toole, chair of the Port Authority of New York and New Jersey and former state senator
- Joseph Pennacchio, state senator
- Sylvia Petillo, Sussex County Freeholder Deputy Director (endorsed Antony Ghee)
- Nicolas Platt, Harding Township Committeeman
- Steve Rogers, Nutley Commissioner of Public Affairs and candidate for governor in 2017

===== Endorsements =====
Antony Ghee

State senators

- Kristin Corrado (R-40)

State assembly member

- BettyLou DeCroce (R-26)
- Kevin J. Rooney (R-40)
- Christopher DePhillips (R-40)

Local officials

- John Coiro, mayor of Totowa
- Walter Davidson Jr, Passaic County Clerk
- Sylvia Petillo, Sussex County Freeholder Deputy Director
- Steven Rogers, Nutley Commissioner of Public Affairs, member of Trump Advisory Board, chairman of NJ Team Trump
- John Speer, mayor of Ringwood
- Peter Tanella, mayor of Cedar Grove
- Joseph Tempesta, mayor of West Caldwell
- Chris Vergano, mayor of Wayne

==== Results ====
Republican primary results
Party	Candidate	Votes	%
Republican	Jay Webber	16,417	40.0
Republican	Peter de Neufville	12,487	30.5
Republican	Antony E. Ghee	8,991	21.9
Republican	Patrick S. Allocco	1,680	4.1
Republican	Martin Hewitt	1,428	3.5
Total votes		41,003	100

=== Democratic primary ===
This was one of 80 Republican-held House districts targeted by the Democratic Congressional Campaign Committee in 2018.

==== Candidates ====
===== Nominee =====
- Mikie Sherrill, retired Navy helicopter pilot and former federal prosecutor

===== Eliminated in primary =====
- Mitchell Cobert, attorney
- Jack Gebbia, Army National Guard veteran
- Tamara Harris, divorce coach and college instructor
- Mark Washburne, County College of Morris professor

===== Withdrawn =====
- John Bartlett, Passaic County Freeholder (running for re-election)

===== Declined =====
- Al Anthony, Livingston Township Councilman and former mayor of Livingston
- Keith Kazmark, mayor of Woodland Park
- John F. McKeon, state assembly member
- Mike Venezia, mayor of Bloomfield

==== Results ====
Democratic primary results
Party	Candidate	Votes	%
Democratic	Mikie Sherrill	35,338	77.4
Democratic	Tamara Harris	6,615	14.5
Democratic	Mark Washburne	1,538	3.4
Democratic	Alison Heslin	1,253	2.7
Democratic	Mitchell H. Cobert	885	1.9
Total votes		45,629	100

=== General election ===
==== Endorsements ====
Jay Webber (R)

U.S. Executive Branch officials

- Mike Pence, Vice President of the United States
- Donald Trump, President of the United States

U.S. senators

- Tom Cotton, U.S. Senator (R-AR)

State senators

- Anthony Bucco (25th District)

State Assembly members

- Robert Auth (39th District)
- Tony Bucco (25th District)
- Caroline Casagrande (former, 11th District)
- Guy R. Gregg (former, 24th District)
- C. Richard Kamin (former, 24th District)

Organizations

- Eagle Forum
- National Republican Congressional Committee "Young Guns" Program
- New Jersey Right to Life
- NRA Political Victory Fund
- Susan B. Anthony List

Local officials

- Robert Alviene, mayor of Butler
- Gary Chiusano, Sussex County Surrogate
- Richard Conklin, mayor of Montville
- Frank Druetzler, mayor Morris Plains
- Ronald Francioli, mayor of Hanover
- William Neely, mayor of Kinnelon
- John Pecoraro, Morris County Surrogate
- David Runfeldt, mayor of Lincoln Park
- Michael Serra, mayor of Pompton Lakes
- Mike Strada, Sussex County Sheriff
- Mark Taylor, mayor of Florham Park

Individuals

- Mark Dunec, 2014 Democratic nominee for New Jersey's 11th congressional district
- Wayne Marek, former Democratic candidate for New Jersey General Assembly
Mikie Sherrill (D)

U.S. Executive Branch officials

- Joe Biden, former Vice President of the United States and former U.S. Senator (D-DE)
- Jim Johnson, former United States Under Secretary of the Treasury for Enforcement

U.S. Senators

- Cory Booker, U.S. Senator (D-NJ)
- Brian Schatz, U.S. Senator (D-HI)
- Elizabeth Warren, U.S. Senator (D-MA)

U.S. Representatives

- Ben Ray Lujan, U.S. Representative (D-NM)
- Seth Moulton, U.S. Representative (D-MA)
- Bill Pascrell, U.S. Representative (D-NJ)
- Donald Payne Jr., U.S. Representatives (D-NJ)

Statewide officials

- Richard Codey, 54th governor of New Jersey and current State Senator (27th District)
- Phil Murphy, governor of New Jersey

State senators

- Loretta Weinberg (37th District)

State Assembly members

- Mila Jasey (27th District)

Labor unions

- AFL-CIO
- Communications Workers of America
- International Brotherhood of Boilermakers
- New Jersey State Police Benevolent's Association
- United Brotherhood of Carpenters and Joiners of America

Organizations

- Blue Dog Coalition
- Democratic Congressional Campaign Committee "Red to Blue" Program
- EMILY's List
- End Citizens United
- Jewish Democratic Council of America
- MoveOn
- NARAL Pro-Choice America
- New Democrat Coalition
- Planned Parenthood Action Fund
- Sierra Club
- VoteVets
- With Honor Fund
- Working Families Party

Newspapers

- New Jersey Hills Media Group, publisher of 10 local papers in the district
- The New York Times

Local officials

- Robert "Bob" Connelly, mayor of Madison
- Amalia Duarte, Committeewoman of Mendham Township
- Manny Friedlander, Councilman of Rockaway Township
- Keith Kazmark, mayor of Woodland Park
- Joe Pannullo, mayor of East Hanover
- Mike Puzio, Councilman of Rockaway Township (Republican)
- Jonathan Sackett, Councilman of Rockaway Township

Individuals

- Tom Colicchio, professional chef
- Bruce Springsteen, singer
- Patrick Wilson, actor

County Democratic Party organizations

- Morris County

==== Debate ====
2018 New Jersey's 11th congressional district debate
No.	Date	Host	Moderator	Link	Republican	Democratic
Key: P Participant A Absent N Not invited I Invited W Withdrawn						
Key: P Participant A Absent N Not invited I Invited W Withdrawn					Jay Webber	Mikie Sherrill
1	Oct. 10, 2018	NJTV	Michael Aron		P	P

==== Polling ====
Poll source	Date(s) administered	Sample size	Margin of error	Jay Webber (R)	Mikie Sherrill (D)	Other	Undecided
NYT Upshot/Siena College	October 13–17, 2018	487	± 4.6%	38%	49%	2%	11%
Monmouth University	October 3–7, 2018	356	± 5.2%	44%	48%	1%	6%
National Research Inc. (R-Webber)	September 24–27, 2018	400	± 4.9%	43%	46%	–	–
Monmouth University	June 22–25, 2018	339 LV	± 5.3%	40%	44%	1%	15%
Monmouth University	June 22–25, 2018	406 RV	± 4.9%	38%	40%	1%	20%

Hypothetical polling

Poll source	Date(s) administered	Sample size	Margin of error	Generic Republican	Mikie Sherill (D)	Other	Undecided
Public Policy Polling (D)	February 12–13, 2018	688	± 3.7%	42%	40%	–	18%

Poll source	Date(s) administered	Sample size	Margin of error	Rodney Freylinghuysen (R)	Democratic candidate (D)	Other	Undecided
Public Policy Polling (D)	November 8–9, 2017	710	± 3.7%	44%	46%	–	10%

==== Predictions ====
Source	Ranking	As of
The Cook Political Report	Lean D (flip)	November 5, 2018
Inside Elections	Lean D (flip)	November 5, 2018
Sabato's Crystal Ball	Lean D (flip)	November 5, 2018
RCP	Lean D (flip)	November 5, 2018
Daily Kos	Lean D (flip)	November 5, 2018
538	Likely D (flip)	November 7, 2018
CNN	Lean D (flip)	October 31, 2018
Politico	Lean D (flip)	November 2, 2018

==== Results ====
New Jersey's 11th congressional district, 2018
Party	Candidate	Votes	%
Democratic	Mikie Sherrill	183,684	56.8
Republican	Jay Webber	136,322	42.1
Independent	Robert Crook	2,182	0.7
Libertarian	Ryan Martinez	1,386	0.4
Majority		47,362	14.7
Total votes		323,574	100.0
Democratic gain from Republican			

==== By county ====
County	Mikie Sherrill Democratic		Jay Webber Republican		Various candidates Other parties		Margin		Total votes cast
County	#	%	#	%	#	%	#	%	Total votes cast
Essex (part)	56,669	66.2%	28,008	32.7%	909	1.1%	28,661	33.5%	85,586
Morris (part)	89,881	54.6%	73,044	44.4%	1,600	1.0%	16,837	10.2%	164,525
Passaic (part)	27,484	52.4%	24,433	46.6%	545	1.1%	3,051	5.8%	52,462
Sussex (part)	9,650	46.0%	10,837	51.6%	514	2.4%	−1,187	−5.6%	21,001
Totals	183,684	56.8%	136,322	42.1%	3,568	1.1%	47,362	14.7%	323,574

== District 12 ==
2018 New Jersey's 12th congressional district election
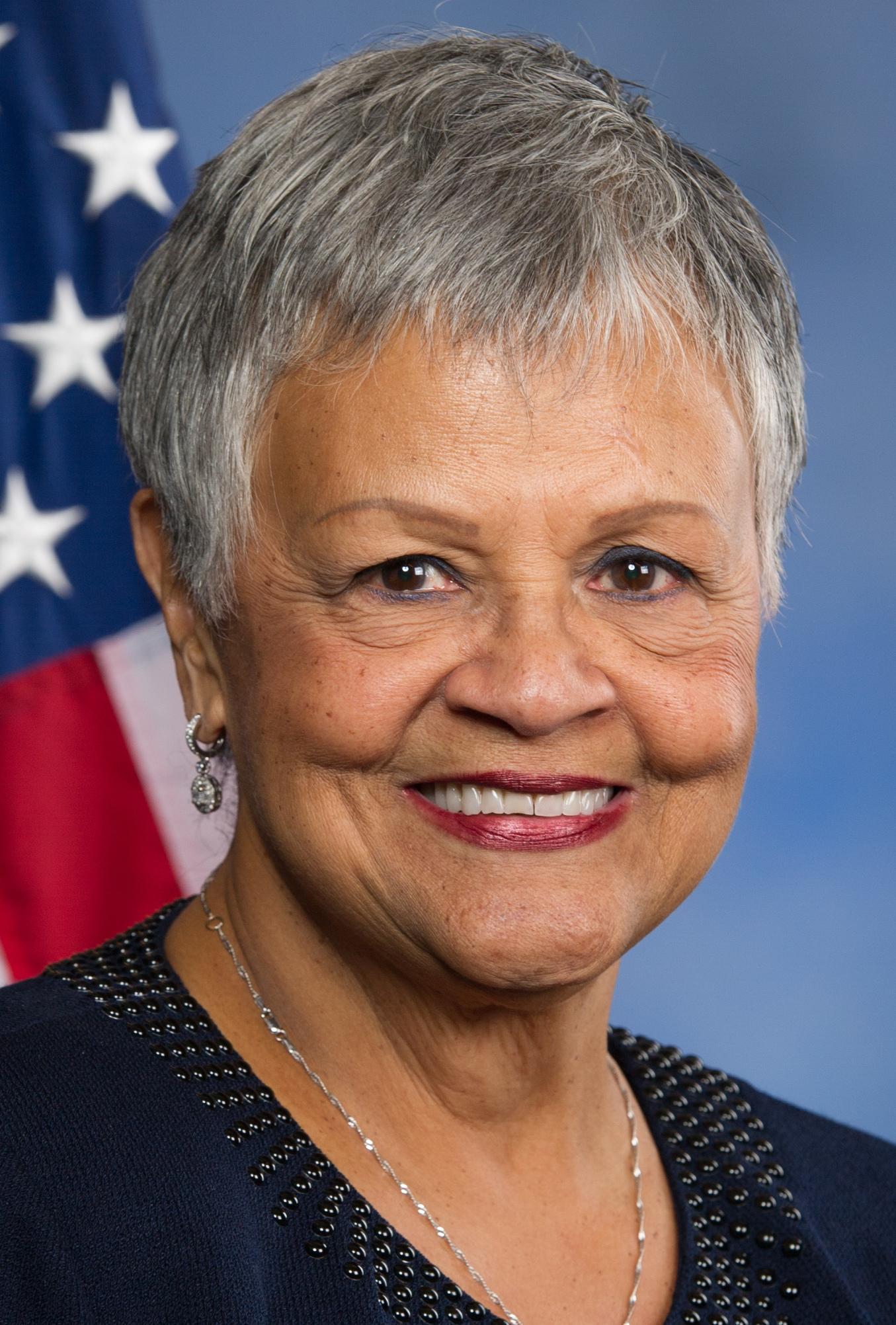

Nominee	Bonnie Watson Coleman	Daryl Kipnis
Party	Democratic	Republican
Popular vote	173,334	79,041
Percentage	68.7%	31.3%
- Watson Coleman: 50–60% 60–70% 70–80% 80–90% >90% Kipnis: 50–60%
U.S. Representative before election
Bonnie Watson Coleman
Democratic
Elected U.S. Representative
Bonnie Watson Coleman
Democratic

The 12th district is based in Central Jersey and includes parts of Mercer, Middlesex, Somerset and Union counties. The district is known for its research centers and educational institutions such as Princeton University, Institute for Advanced Study, Johnson & Johnson and Bristol-Myers Squibb. Incumbent Democrat Bonnie Watson Coleman, who had represented the district since 2015, ran for re-election. She was re-elected with 63% of the vote in 20. The district had a PVI of +.

=== Democratic primary ===
==== Candidates ====
===== Nominee =====
- Bonnie Watson Coleman, incumbent U.S. Representative

==== Results ====
Democratic primary results
Party	Candidate	Votes	%
Democratic	Bonnie Watson Coleman (incumbent)	35,430	100.0
Total votes		35,430	100.0

=== Republican primary ===
==== Candidates ====
===== Nominee =====
- Daryl Kipnis, attorney and nominee for state senate (LD-17) in 2017

==== Results ====
Republican primary results
Party	Candidate	Votes	%
Republican	Daryl Kipnis	9,776	100.0
Total votes		9,776	100.0

=== General election ===
==== Predictions ====
Source	Ranking	As of
The Cook Political Report	Safe D	November 5, 2018
Inside Elections	Safe D	November 5, 2018
Sabato's Crystal Ball	Safe D	November 5, 2018
RCP	Safe D	November 5, 2018
Daily Kos	Safe D	November 5, 2018
538	Safe D	November 7, 2018
CNN	Safe D	October 31, 2018
Politico	Safe D	November 4, 2018

==== Endorsements ====
Bonnie Watson Coleman (D)

Labor unions

- AFL-CIO
- Communications Workers of America
- International Brotherhood of Boilermakers

Organizations

- Congressional Progressive Caucus

==== Results ====
New Jersey's 12th congressional district, 2018
Party	Candidate	Votes	%
Democratic	Bonnie Watson Coleman (incumbent)	173,334	68.7
Republican	Daryl Kipnis	79,041	31.3
Total votes		252,375	100.0
Democratic hold			

==== By county ====
County	Bonnie Watson Coleman Democratic		Daryl Kipnis Republican		Margin		Total votes cast
County	#	%	#	%	#	%	Total votes cast
Mercer (part)	66,323	76.7%	20,157	23.3%	46,166	53.4%	86,480
Middlesex (part)	65,788	60.2%	43,423	39.8%	22,365	20.4%	109,211
Somerset (part)	21,970	69.9%	9,440	30.1%	12,530	39.8%	31,410
Union (part)	19,253	76.2%	6,021	23.8%	12,232	52.4%	25,274
Totals	173,334	68.7%	79,041	31.3%	94,293	37.4%	252,375

Official campaign websites
- District 1
  - Donald Norcross (D) for Congress
  - Paul E. Dilks (R) for Congress Archived July 2, 2018, at the Wayback Machine
- District 2
  - Seth Grossman (R) for Congress
  - Jeff Van Drew (D) for Congress
- District 3
  - Tom MacArthur (R) for Congress
  - Andy Kim (D) for Congress
- District 4
  - Christopher H. Smith (R) for Congress
  - Josh Welle (D) for Congress Archived October 5, 2017, at the Wayback Machine
- District 5
  - Josh Gottheimer (D) for Congress
  - John McCann (R) for Congress
- District 6
  - Frank Pallone Jr. (D) for Congress
  - Rich Pezzullo (R) for Congress
- District 7th
  - Leonard Lance (R) for Congress
  - Tom Malinowski (D) for Congress
- District 8th
  - Albio Sires (D) for Congress
- District 9th
  - Bill Pascrell (D) for Congress
- District 10th
  - Donald M. Payne Jr. (D) for Congress
  - Agha Khan (R) for Congress
- District 11th
  - Mikie Sherrill (D) for Congress
  - Jay Webber (R) for Congress
- District 12th
  - Bonnie Watson Coleman (D) for Congress
  - Daryl Kipnis (R) for Congress
