= R. Bruce Land =

American politician

Bruce Land
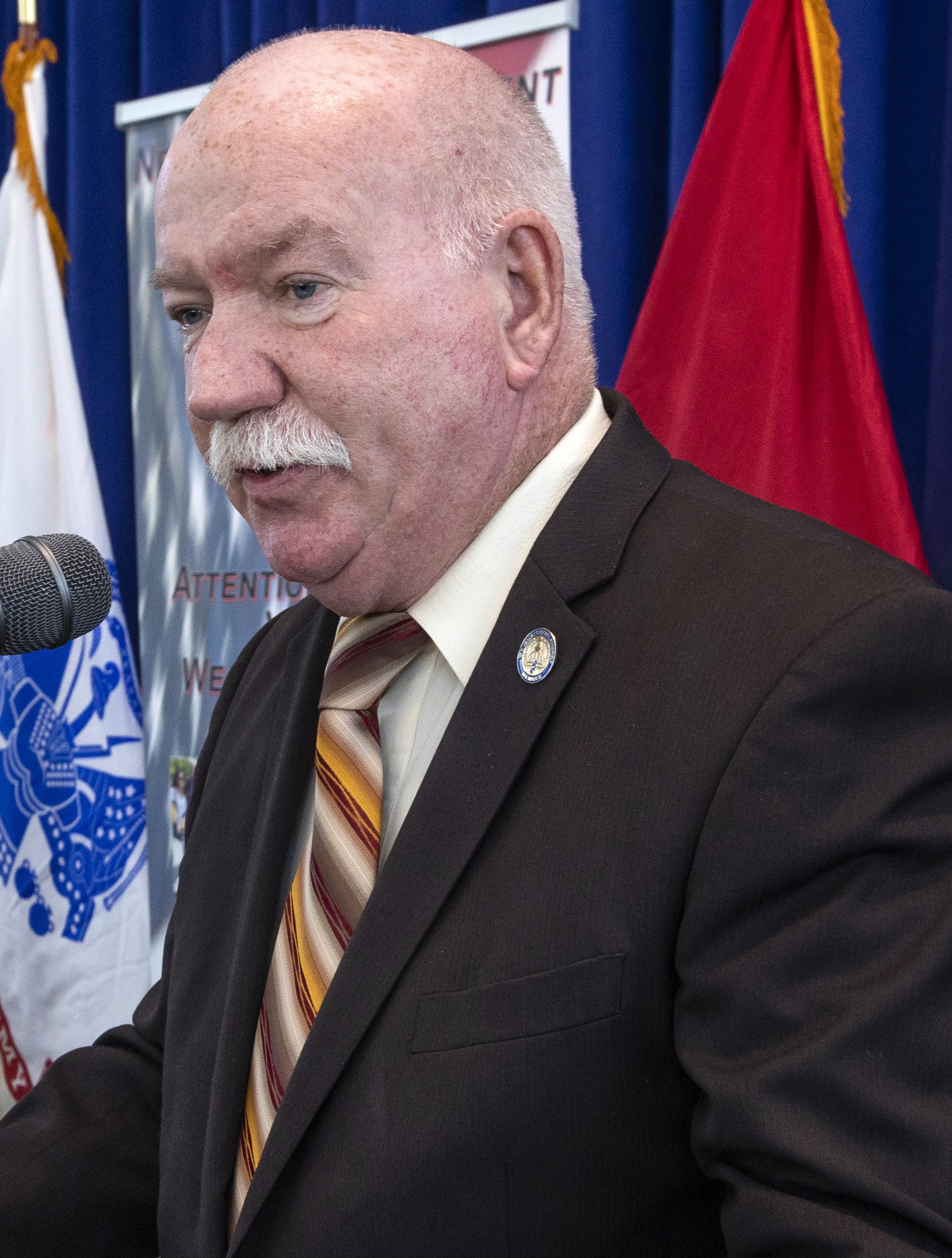

Member of the New Jersey General Assembly from the 1st District
- In office January 12, 2016 – January 14, 2020
- Preceded by: Sam Fiocchi
- Succeeded by: Antwan McClellan; Erik K. Simonsen

Personal details
- Born: June 24, 1950 (age 76)
- Party: Democratic

Military service
- Branch/service: United States Army
- Years of service: 1969–1971
- Unit: 101st Airborne Division
- Battles/wars: Vietnam War
- Awards: Bronze Star (2)

R. Bruce Land (born June 24, 1950) is an American Democratic Party politician who represented the 1st Legislative District in the New Jersey General Assembly from 2016 to 2020.

== Early life ==
Land grew up in Millville, New Jersey and graduated from Millville Senior High School as part of the class of 1968. He was drafted to serve in the United States Army and was assigned to duty with the 101st Airborne Division in Vietnam during the second year of his two-year enlistment from 1969 to 1971, and was twice awarded the Bronze Star during the Vietnam War. Land attended Cumberland County College, where he majored in business marketing. Land had worked in management of a department store in Vineland. He made a career change and began working for the New Jersey Department of Corrections, assigned to Bayside State Prison in Leesburg and South Woods State Prison in Bridgeton until his retirement in March 2008 with the rank of captain.

== New Jersey Assembly ==
Land ran as a team with Democratic incumbent Assemblyman Bob Andrzejczak, and won his first bid for elected office, defeating Republican incumbent Sam Fiocchi and his running mate Jim Sauro. Land and Andrzejczak spent four times as much as their opponents and were supported by $1.5 million in independent advertising that claimed that Fiocchi had not paid taxes. In Land’s 2019 re-election campaign he and his running mate Matt Milam lost the election to republicans Erik Simonsen and Antwan McClellan.

=== Tenure ===
Land voted against raising the states minimum wage to $15 an hour alongside Matt Milam.

=== Committees Assignments ===
- Homeland Security and State Preparedness
- Military and Veterans' Affairs
- Tourism, Gaming and the Arts
- Regulated Professions

== Electoral history ==
=== General Assembly ===
2019 New Jersey General Assembly election for the 1st Legislative District
Party	Candidate	Votes	%
Republican	Erik K. Simonsen	27,304	27.15%
Republican	Antwan McClellan	26,264	26.11%
Democratic	Bruce Land (incumbent)	23,778	23.64%
Democratic	Matthew W. Milam (incumbent)	23,234	23.10%
Total votes		100,508	100.0%

2017 New Jersey General Assembly election for the 1st Legislative District
Party	Candidate	Votes	%	±%
Democratic	Bob Andrzejczak (incumbent)	32,554	31.2	▲3.3
Democratic	Bruce Land (incumbent)	30,938	29.7	▲3.3
Republican	Jim Sauro	20,445	19.6	▼3.0
Republican	Robert G. Campbell	20,250	19.4	▼3.8
Total votes		'104,187'	'100.0'	

2015 New Jersey General Assembly election for the 1st Legislative District
Party	Candidate	Votes	%	±%
Democratic	Bob Andrzejczak (incumbent)	20,231	27.9	▲0.7
Democratic	Bruce Land	19,140	26.4	▲2.2
Republican	Sam Fiocchi (incumbent)	16,818	23.2	▼1.8
Republican	Jim Sauro	16,395	22.6	▼0.9
Total votes		'72,584'	'100.0'	

New Jersey General Assembly
Preceded by Sam Fiocchi	Member of the New Jersey General Assembly for the 1st District; 2016 – 2020; With: Bob Andrzejczak, Matthew W. Milam	Succeeded by Antwan McClellan; Erik K. Simonsen
