= Jim Keady =

American activist, educator and politician

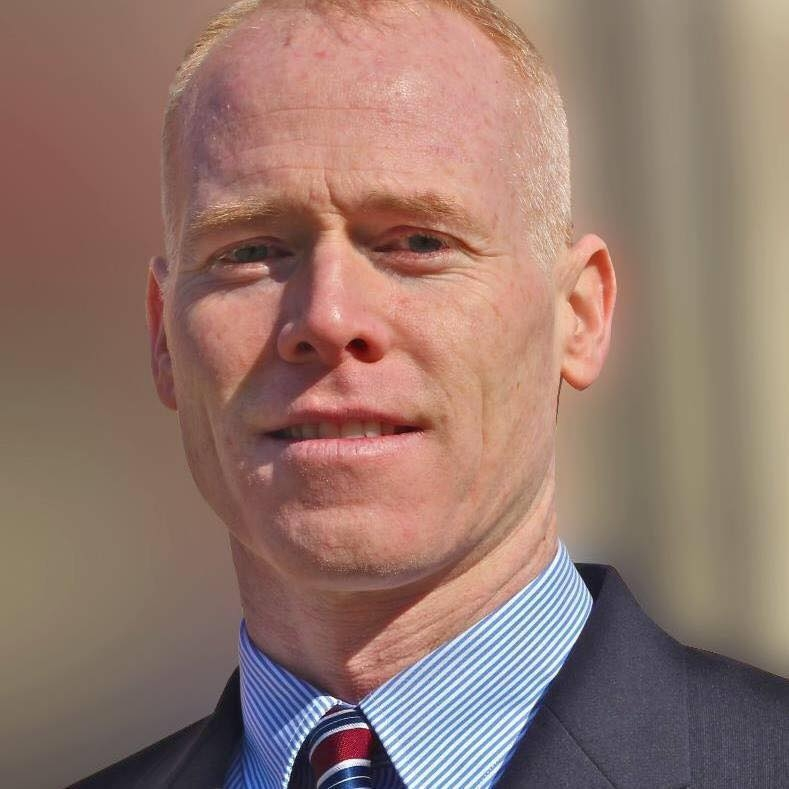

Member of the Asbury Park City Council
- In office 2006–2009

Personal details
- Born: October 4, 1971 (age 55) Neptune Township, New Jersey
- Education: St. John's University
- Occupation: Activist * Educator * Politician

James W. Keady (born October 4, 1971) is an American tavern owner, activist, educator, and politician who served on the Asbury Park, New Jersey city council and made several unsuccessful runs for higher office.

== Early life and education ==
Keady was born in Neptune Township, NJ and grew up in Belmar, NJ. He attended the Christian Brothers Academy all-boys college preparatory school in Middletown Township, NJ. He later went on to receive a Master's degree in Pastoral Theology at St. John's University.

== Activism ==
=== Nike Sweatshops ===
In 1998, Keady was conducting research about Nike's business practices at St. John's University, the school signed a $3.5 million deal with Nike, forcing all athletes and coaches to endorse Nike. Keady publicly refused to support Nike and was forced to resign his position as soccer coach.

After resigning, Keady continued to research the conditions in Nike's Sweatshops. He traveled to Indonesia and for a month lived among the Nike factory workers, surviving on the $1.25 per day wage the workers earn. Keady's efforts were recognized on many media outlets, including CBS, NBC, Fox, ABC, MSNBC, CNN, HBO Sports, ESPN, the ABC, the BBC, NPR, WBAI, as well as in the NY Times, Newsday, Sports Illustrated, the Daily News, Daily Kos and many other local radio programs and print outlets. He offers an educational workshops called "Beyond the Swoosh" where he shares his experiences living with Nike's factory workers and his decade long effort to end sweatshop abuses.

After a decade of activism, Indonesian Nike supplier PT Nikomas Gemiland repaid 4437 production workers for 600,000 hours of forced unpaid labor.

In September 2018, Nike and Keady were in the news again over a controversial ad campaign with Colin Kaepernick, famed football player and social justice protester. Keady was asked to voice his views regarding Nike's stance on social justice in the United States while the company has a history of social justice controversies globally.

=== Hurricane Sandy ===
In 2012, Keady volunteered to lead recovery efforts in his hometown of Belmar, NJ, after Hurricane Sandy. Two years later, Governor Chris Christie visited the town to publicize state recovery efforts. Keady interrupted the press conference to voice his complaints about the pace of recovery. Christie told him to “sit down and shut up.”

The encounter gained national media attention. Keady appeared on several news networks explaining of the $1.1 billion in federal funding allocated to the program, state data showed roughly $530 million has been awarded and more than $222 million has been disbursed.

After this experience, Mr. Keady ran for Congress in the 4th District against Republican incumbent Chris Smith.

=== Syrian Refugee Crisis ===
In 2015, Keady spent 10 days in Lesbos, Greece to help refugees from war-torn Middle Eastern countries find new lives in the west. Keady said he went to Greece when he saw rising anti-Muslim and anti-refugee sentiment in the aftermath of the Paris terror attacks. "It’s not just a political issue; these are people," said Keady. "These are people that just want a better life. They left areas that have been ravaged by war."

=== Hurricane Maria ===
In 2017, after Hurricane Maria hit Puerto Rico, Keady made multiple humanitarian trips to provide aid to the people of the island.

=== Revolutionary Communist Party USA ===
Keady has participated in multiple events organized by RevCom affiliated organization Refuse Fascism. These include rallies by the group in New York City in May 2025 and Washington DC on June 14, 2025.

== Legislative career ==
=== Asbury Park City Council ===
In 2005, Keady served on the Asbury Park City Council. He ran with two other city residents but he was the only one on his team to be elected. While on council, Keady served as co-chair of the council's subcommittee on affordable housing; the Asbury Works advisory board; the Springwood Avenue redevelopment advisory committee; the subcommittee on homelessness; and the parking commission. Keady resigned six months before his four-year term was up, due to family reasons.

=== NJ State Assembly ===
In 2015, Keady ran for state General Assembly in New Jersey's 30th Legislative District, citing the lack of leadership, accountability and transparency following Hurricane Sandy recovery as his motivation to run. Keady received endorsement of Rage Against the Machine guitarist and social activist Tom Morello.

Keady finished in 3rd place behind the two Republican Incumbents in the election.

=== US Congress ===
In 2016, the DCCC recruited Keady to run for the United States House of Representatives in New Jersey's 3rd Congressional district. He lost the Democratic primary to Frederick John Lavergne.

In February 2017, Keady announced his run for Congress in his home New Jersey's 4th Congressional District. Keady received an endorsement from Progressive Democrats of America, Our Revolution New Jersey Volunteers and DHU: Demand Universal Healthcare, among others. He lost the primary to Joshua Welle, who lost the general election to Republican incumbent Chris Smith.

In November 2019, Keady announced a third run for Congress for the same seat. On January 17, 2020, he sent an email to supporters announcing his withdrawal from the Primary after being asked to drop out by multiple Democratic Party organizations and leaders.
