= Sam Fiocchi =

American politician

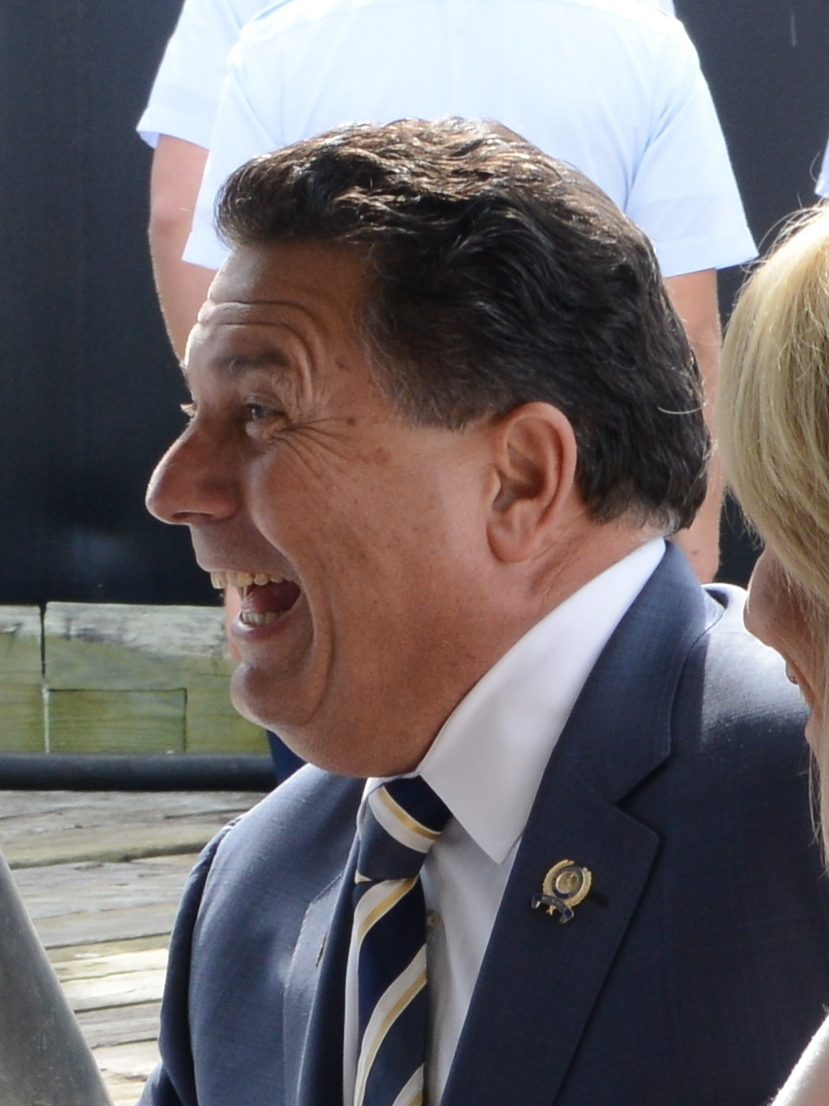

Member of the New Jersey General Assembly from the 1st district
- In office January 14, 2014 – January 12, 2016
- Preceded by: Nelson Albano
- Succeeded by: R. Bruce Land

Cumberland County Freeholder
- In office January 1, 2011 – December 31, 2013
- Preceded by: Joseph Pepitone; Nelson Thompson
- Succeeded by: Thomas L. Sheppard; Darlene R. Barber

Personal details
- Born: October 1, 1952 (age 73) Vineland, New Jersey
- Party: Republican

Samuel L. Fiocchi (born October 1, 1952) is an American Republican politician who represented the 1st Legislative District in the New Jersey General Assembly from January 14, 2014 to January 12, 2016. He took office after he defeated Nelson Albano in the 2013 general election.

Fiocchi was born and raised in Vineland, New Jersey and attended St. Augustine Preparatory School and Widener University. Fiocchi had been a member of the Cumberland County Board of Chosen Freeholders from 2011 to 2013 for one term and had been a member of the Vineland Zoning Board from 2009 to 2011. He is also a real estate agent and served on the transition team for Chris Christie in 2010.

During his term in the Assembly, he served on the Human Services, Regulatory Oversight, and Telecommunications and Utilities committees. After serving one term, he and Republican running mate, Cumberland County Freeholder Jim Sauro, were defeated by incumbent Democrat Bob Andrzejczak and his running mate R. Bruce Land.

New Jersey General Assembly
Preceded by Nelson Albano	Member of the New Jersey General Assembly for the 1st District; January 14, 2014 – January 12, 2016; With: Bob Andrzejczak	Succeeded by R. Bruce Land
