= Clark: A Gonzomentary =

- Story by: Daniel D.W. James Curcio; William Clark
- Produced by: Daniel D.W.
- Starring: William Clark; James Curcio; Daniel D.W. David Proch
- Release dates: March 2013 (LA Web Fest); June 28, 2013 (United States)
- Running time: 99 minutes
- Country: United States
- Language: English

Clark: A Gonzomentary is a 2013 American gonzo journalism-styled mockumentary written, directed and produced by Daniel D.W.

== Production and creation ==
Clark: A Gonzomentary is about a fictionalized version of the director documenting an eccentric local artists creative process and obsession with phallic art. It is a style of metafiction. The term "gonzomentary" was created by director Daniel D.W. and was a portmanteau of the words "gonzo", from gonzo journalism, and "mockumentary" to define a new type of film where metafictional events are presented to show fictional events in a subjective first-person narrative in documentary style to create a parody of itself intentionally to confuse the viewer between reality and fiction. This included using fictional hype and notoriety to make audiences believe that that hype and notoriety existed while insisting that the film is a work of fine art.

Daniel and the two main actors, William Clark and James Curcio, are credited as the writers of the movie based on the fact that much of the dialogue was ad libbed by them. The episodes plots and scenes were scripted with a loose outline and talking points that the actors were required to improvise around, a method that Daniel D.W. borrowed from Larry David's H.B.O series, Curb Your Enthusiasm. Clark: A Gonzomentary began as a seven episode bi-weekly webseries syndicated by Alterati.com in 2010, and a 2011 five episode fictional "behind the scenes" series which was edited together and serves as the long-form movie version.

The two main characters, Clark and J.C. are played by the American actors William Clark and James Curcio, who both had never acted beforehand. Daniel D.W. wrote the characters as an exaggerated parody of themselves, and felt that their inexperience as actors would translate more realistically. Daniel D.W. appears as an alternative version of himself, the maker of the documentary and his character is normally off-camera and occasionally interacts with Clark and J.C. Other actors in the movie are David Proch as Tito, and Jazmin Idakaar as a fundamentalist Christian executive producer for the fictional film company. Actors Albert Mariotti, Mike Zimmer II, Matt Grossman, and Rahim Muhammed play supporting roles.

== Style ==
The film satirizes the wild personal behavior, social deviations and self-image pretensions of artists and filmmakers, and was inspired by Satyr plays, Dadaism, contemporary counter-culture artists, the film Pollock as well as other influences. For the majority of the film, it is stylized as a parody of a popular mockumentary and reality show style that trended in the late 2000s and early 2010s, but combines a variety of styles similar to sitcom TV shows, silent film and art films, purportedly filmed and directed by the fictionalized alter ego of Daniel D.W.. The film tells the meta story of Daniel, an amateur filmmaker documenting the lifestyle of phallic artist, William Clark and his opportunist art manager J.C. for a documentary web series. This plot line is established with the opening text stating "In 2010, a guy with a camera tried to make a webseries about an eccentric local artist's art process and this is what happened instead." The film jumps back and forth from the documented webseries, to interviews during filming of the webseries, to interviews filmed after the webseries with the main characters playing actors who were portraying characterizations of themselves.

Being purposefully careless and using guerrilla filmmaking techniques, the director stylized the film itself as a parody of amateur films which is referenced by multiple characters during the story, stating that the process is far more important than the actual end-product. This was an attempt to create a meta story that is a parody of itself to comment on do-it-yourself style filmmaking and art. This was noted by Mark Bell of Film Threat saying "Even when I'd come up with a criticism to lodge at it, the film itself would find a way to address it. For example, at one point the film’s dynamic between Clark and J.C. becomes repetitious and stale: Clark says he doesn't need money, calls J.C. a parasite and J.C. points out how wrong he is. This "conversation" happens quite often in the film, and the moment I started to make note of how old it was getting, the film started fucking with its own audio, looping the two going back and forth at each other. In other words, the film was just as annoyed as I was; it’s like the film itself had become self-aware."

== Plot ==
The story begins with b-roll of Clark with voice over of an interview with Clark talking about himself in the third person and his artistic creativity and integrity. This is refuted immediately with an interview with Clark's art manager, J.C. who states that he's not been able to get work out of Clark for months other than crude sketches of penises. J.C. reports that he supports the artist financially and expresses his frustration and that his plan is to feed Clark drugs so that he can control him and get him to produce. This is followed by the director of "Clark: The Webseries," Daniel, who explains how difficult it was to film the webseries.

The next scene shows J.C. introducing Daniel to Clark, who is sitting naked in a bathtub with empty bottles of beer and alcohol. Clark is resistant and belittling to Daniel's intrusiveness, while Daniel is obviously uncomfortable with the scene, J.C. insists that filming Clark in his current state is "where the real art is happening." Clark begins to become agitated and has a rambling fit about his father. They move to another room where Clark is asked to explain his art but is shown that he can't, rambling incoherently and is interrupted by J.C. who gives him alcohol and oxycontin. This relationship between J.C. and Clark is reinforced consistently throughout the movie, while showing a mixture of the webseries' episodes in a linear timeline mixed with behind-the-scenes interviews in a non-linear timeline.

The story introduces the fictitious production company, Exodus Films' executive producer Jazmin, a fundamentalist Christian, who mentions that the material isn't family friendly enough. She quickly is led away from her current lifestyle by J.C. and Clark to follow her true dream of being a mime managed by J.C.. In a silent film style episode, J.C. tells Clark that he's quitting as his manager to focus on "Jazmime's" career and that he is kicking Clark out of the house. J.C. explains on camera that he wasn't sure what Daniel was doing with the silent film style with music from Vivaldi's The Four Seasons, claiming Daniel had become "artsy-fartsy," a claim that Daniel responds by saying he had no choice but to make a silent episode because Clark wouldn't read any lines anymore or speak in English for days, we then see footage of Clark speaking gibberish. Clark is shown struggling with homelessness while J.C. realizes that managing a mime isn't going to be profitable, so he gives her a newspaper classified article implying she should get a job in the porn industry. J.C. goes to search for Clark and finds him 5 feet outside of his door, where Clark shows J.C. his new creation, penis sculptures made out of trash.

Another character, Tito, is introduced as J.C.'s drug dealer, who he calls to get "fuel" to keep Clark awake all night to produce art for an art show that is scheduled for the next day. Tito arrives with two large bags of cocaine and asks J.C. if he can inject heroin in their apartment. J.C. complies and Tito overdoses. When discovered that he is dead Clark and J.C. go through his pockets to find his phone in a plan to call his dealer disguising themselves as Tito to get free cocaine. Clark suggests that they cut off Tito's face and he'll wear it when he confronts the dealer. J.C. then explains in an interview that things turned really dark after that and that he is worried about Daniel. Clark meets with Tito's dealer, a young kid, while wearing Tito's removed face. He shoots the dealer and steals his drugs which introduces the third act of the movie, where it is revealed as Daniel's bad LSD trip that is causing confusion.

Clark, Daniel and J.C. cycle through a time loop in Daniel's mind which alters the original story each time. J.C.'s character gradually becomes similar to Hunter S. Thompson and Clark begins killing puppets in an imaginary world. This is inter-spliced with the reality that Clark and J.C. are trying to help Daniel from his bad trip. It is then revealed that they locked Daniel in a room in the basement that they call the "deprivation tank" for a few days. When they find Daniel he is still under the effects of multiple hallucinogens that J.C. and Clark had been secretly giving him for weeks, and they take him to the hospital. The last scene shows Clark being extremely pleased with himself until the interviewer asks him about his influence by his father. This causes Clark to freak out and destroy the four-foot penis sculpture he had been working on for the majority of the story.

== Cast ==
- William Clark as Clark
- James Curcio as J.C.
- Daniel D.W. as Daniel
- David Proch as Tito
- Jazmin Idakaar as Jazmin/Jazmime
- Michael Zimmer II as Tito's Dealer
- Rahim Muhammed as Some Guy In Your Kitchen
- Albert Mariotti as Sandwich For A Blow Job Guy
- Matt Grossman as Aging Former Student

== Reception ==
Since its release, Clark: A Gonzomentary has received acclaim from critics, won the Outstanding Lead Actor Award in a comedy or mockumentary and Outstanding Writing by The 2013 LA Web Series Festival for its original web series, while received an Honorable Mention for Best Documentary at the sixth annual Philadelphia Independent Film Festival for its full-length feature version.

In 2012, Clark: A Gonzomentary was given a four-star review and deemed "a gonzomentary truly realized" by Film Threat

== Release ==
Clark: A Gonzomentary has never been released on DVD, but a free version as well as the original web series are available online.
