= Brandriff =

Brandriff is a surname. Notable people with the surname include:

- Barbara Brandriff Crabb (born 1939), American judge
- George K. Brandriff (1890–1936), American painter
