= Joseph Paskoski =

Joseph Paskoski (22 February 1919 – 15 April 2008) was a fighter ace in the United States Navy during World War II. He was credited with shooting down six enemy aircraft in combat and crippling an enemy battleship. Stationed to the USS Lexington, he saw combat in the pacific theater of the war, fighting from the invasion of Guam to the battle of Leyte Gulf.

== Early life ==
Born to Polish immigrants on February 22, 1919, Paskoski was born and raised in the town of Millville, New Jersey.

== Military career in World War II ==
After enlisting, Paskoski was assigned to Air Group Nineteen (VF19), otherwise known as Satan's Kittens. They boarded the USS Lexington in July 1944. The squadrons first mission was to provide strafing runs and air support for the marines invading Guam. Flying dangerously low avoiding friendly artillery fire, Paskoski managed to destroy a 40mm gun nest. After being stationed at Guam, Satan's Kittens and the USS Lexington saw combat in the battle of Leyte Gulf, in late October 1944. It is here that Paskoski obtained the rank of ace and received both a Silver Star and Navy Cross.

=== Navy Cross ===
Paskoski received the distinguished Navy Cross for conflicting heavy damage against a Japanese battleship, during the battle of Leyte Gulf. He is commended for "Plunging through a heavy barrage of anti-aircraft and expertly maneuvered his plane to release a well-directed bomb at very low altitude, scoring a direct hit upon the battleship and aiding in retarding its progress."

=== Silver Star ===
Paskoski received the Silver Star for intercepting a six plane Japanese fighter squadron. In this aerial combat, he shot down four of the six planes and severely damaged another. This interaction awarded him the status of "Ace".

== Life after the war ==
After leaving AIr Group Nineteen, Paskoski later went on to become Naval Attaché to the US ambassador of Iran and was active in Naval intelligence. Retiring from the Navy with the rank of Commander in 1967, he went on to become a stock broker with Merrill Lynch until 1991. He had a stroke in 2006 and died on April 15, 2008.

== Sources ==
- Joseph John Paskoski. "Valor awards for Joseph John Paskoski". Valor.militarytimes.com.
- Tillman, Barrett. Hellcat, the F6F in World War II. Annapolis, MD: Naval Institute, 2000. Print pg 129
- "Joe Paskoski Obituary - Fort Lauderdale, FL | Sun-Sentinel". Legacy.com.
