= Jim Cook Jr. =

American dramatist (born 1987)

James R. Cook, Jr.
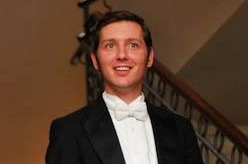
- Jim Cook Jr. at the grand opening gala of the Levoy Theatre in September 2012.
- Born: August 25, 1987 (age 39); Philadelphia, Pennsylvania
- Education: Rowan University (B.A.)
- Military career
- Allegiance: United States of America
- Branch: United States Army
- Service years: 2013-2018
- Rank: Sergeant (E-5)

Jim Cook Jr. (born August 25, 1987, in Philadelphia, Pennsylvania) is an American writer, actor, and musician who served in the United States Army. In 2012, Cook ran a successful election campaign by only using social media. He graduated from Woodstown High School in 2006.

== Biography ==
Cook was raised in Pilesgrove Township, New Jersey and graduated from Woodstown High School in 2006. He graduated from Rowan University in May 2010 and joined the South Jersey Times as a news reporter in November the same year.

In September 2012, Cook wrote and produced Roundabout: A New Amusement, a play about the history of the Levoy Theatre. The play was performed for the theater's grand opening gala. He has served on the theater's Board of Directors since January 2019.

On the night before the general 2012 election, Cook launched a last-minute bid with no funding and less than 24 hours to win a seat on the Woodstown-Pilesgrove Regional School District school board of education. Later that month, it was announced Cook had won a seat representing Pilesgrove Township, using only social media to rally votes.

Due to his position as an editor, Cook was urged by the South Jersey Times to decline the BOE appointment to avoid a conflict of interest, to which he agreed.

On October 3, 2013, Cook announced his departure from the South Jersey Times and his enlistment into the United States Army. He completed Basic Combat Training at Fort Jackson in South Carolina in February 2014. He served his full enlistment at Osan Air Base in the Republic of Korea assigned to the 3rd Battlefield Coordination Detachment (3rd BCD-K).

He currently teaches English Language Arts at Woodstown High School.

== Stray electricity investigation ==
From 2010 to 2013 at the South Jersey Times (then The News of Cumberland County), Cook worked closely with former 1981 NFL Baltimore Colt defensive lineman Anthony “Bubba” Green on a series investigating the city of Baltimore in the electrocution death of Green's daughter Deanna in Druid Hill Park in 2006. The series — along with various legal proceedings — assisted in the creation of the Deanna Camille Green Rule, which requires electric companies in Maryland to survey for contact voltage (stray electricity). The overall intention of the rule is to prevent accidental electrocutions.

The series — later titled Battling Stray Electricity: A family's journey — received a 2010 New Jersey Press Association award in Public Service.

== Writing ==
Year(s)	Work	Type
2010	A Christmas Carol	Stage Play
2012	Roundabout, A New Amusement	Stage Play

== Awards ==
• New Jersey Press Association (2010) | Lloyd P. Burns Award for Public Service

• New Jersey Press Association (2012) | Breaking News

• Beyond the Curve International Film Festival (Aug 2021) | Finalist | The Roommate

• The International Documentary Film Festival (July 2023) | Honorable Mention | Mini Doc: On Golden Pond
