= General Confession =

Christian prayer

The General Confession is a prayer of contrition in various Christian denominations, including Lutheranism, Anglicanism, Methodism and Roman Catholicism.

== Lutheranism ==
In the Lutheran Churches, General Confession occurs during the Penitential Act of the Mass. During the Penitential Act, the Confiteor is recited by all and the priest pronounces absolution.

== Anglicanism and Methodism ==
In Anglicanism, the "General Confession" is the act of contrition in Thomas Cranmer's 1548 order of Communion and later in the Book of Common Prayer.

In Methodism, the General Confession is the same act of contrition in The Sunday Service of the Methodists and Methodist liturgical texts descended from it. It is taught to probationary members seeking full membership in Methodist connexions, being included in The Probationer's Catechism.

== Roman Catholicism ==
As understood by St. Ignatius of Loyola, General Confession is a form of Confession whereby one spends 3 to 10 days preparing for a confession of all one's 'sins up to that time.' The main goal of the "general confession" is to turn one's life from one of sin to a more devout one. The Spiritual Exercises of St. Ignatius have done much to popularise this form of confession, with such a confession being the significant end-point of the First Week of his Spiritual Exercises.

St. Francis de Sales, in his Introduction to the Devout Life, also addresses General Confession.

== See also ==
- Spiritual Exercises of Ignatius of Loyola
- Society of Jesus
- Retreat (spiritual)
- Manchurian revival (Protestant)
