= Levoy Theatre =

- Formerly listed on the U.S. National Register of Historic Places
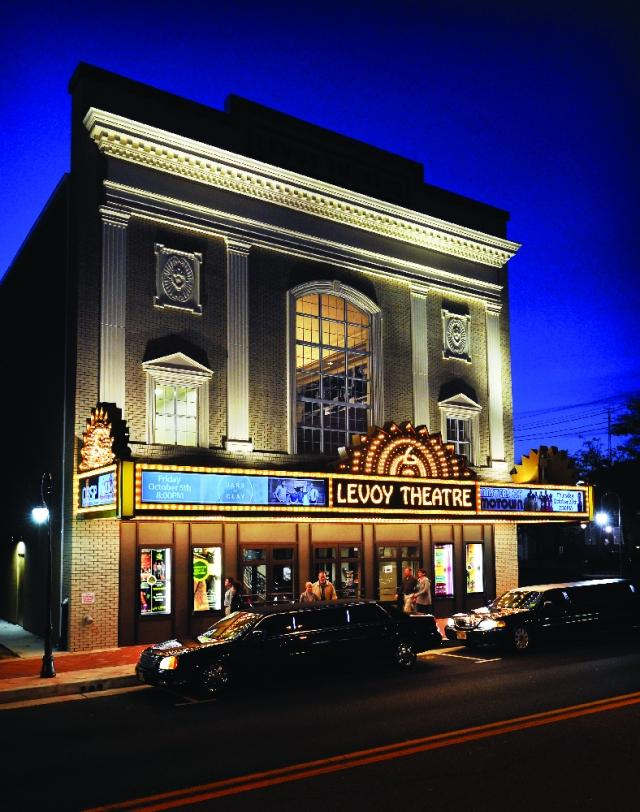
- The Levoy Theatre (Millville, N.J.) reopened in September 2012.

- Location within Cumberland County, New Jersey
- Location: 126-130 North High Street, Millville, New Jersey
- Coordinates: 39°23′48″N 75°2′22″W
- Built: 1908 (original); 1912, 1927 (expansions)
- Architect: Wrifford, William
- Architectural style: Classical Revival, Late Gothic Revival, Art Deco
- Restored: 2010
- NRHP reference No.: 98001064

Significant dates
- Closed: 1974
- Reopened: 2012
- Added to NRHP: August 14, 1998
- Removed from NRHP: July 17, 2013

The Levoy Theatre is a 696-seat operational performing arts center located in Millville, Cumberland County, New Jersey, United States.

== History ==
=== The First Levoy Theatre ===
The first Levoy Theatre filled a ten-year void left in Millville after the 1898 fire that destroyed the Wilson Opera House (once at High and Sassafras Sts.), Millville's largest theatre of the 19th century. By 1908 Millville needed a new source of entertainment, and William "Pop" Somers of Atlantic City and Somers Point fame came to Millville seeing the opportunity for his Levoy. On a side note, Somers was one of the early Ferris Wheel designers, even before Mr. Ferris himself. Only after a lengthy court battle between Ferris and Somers did the famous ride become known as the "Ferris" Wheel and not the "Somers" Wheel.

On January 9, 1908, Somer's first Levoy was opened. It was much smaller than today's structure; there were two floors—the theatre on the lower floor and a dance floor on the upper. The first admission prices were 5¢ for one ticket or 25¢ for six.

The early silent flickering films shown in the original Levoy were often accompanied by a vocalist or piano player in the background to follow the action.

=== The Second Levoy Theatre ===
Only four years after the first Levoy opened it was to be enlarged by Colonel Ellsworth Shaw, a job that took five months, 29 days to enlarge the theatre occupying two store widths and doubling its previous size.

The Levoy now had a larger stage, with a wrap around "horse-shoe" balcony. Its facade at this point slightly resembled the facade of the Levoy known today, at a somewhat smaller scale. Reopening ceremonies began on November 4, 1912, with William Somers’ renaming of his theatre as the "New Levoy".

=== Handle & Rovner’s Theatre Beautiful ===
For the next fifteen years the Levoy was Millville's center of entertainment for silent films and Vaudeville; its main competition came from the Peoples’ Theatre just across the street, also operated by the Levoy's owners.

The famous Morris Handle and A.J. Rovner leased the theatres from Somers in April 1927 and soon decided that the Levoy was the one they were going to invest in. After several months of further enlargements and embellishments creating its current footprint and scale the "Theatre Beautiful" of Millville was ready for its grand reopening.

The Levoy consisted of: a 1,100 seat lower level, a 400-seat balcony, box seating, one of three $30,000 Lenoir pipe organs built specially for the Handel & Rovner Company (serial number #P304B), a stage-proscenium with full fly system, orchestra pit, a marble and chandelier filled lobby and mezzanine, and an ornate classical facade.

Over 3,500 people turned out for opening night, September 19, 1927, with a bill of live Vaudeville acts as the main attraction.

=== Warner Brothers ===
As Vaudeville's popularity waned and film became the dominant entertainment medium, the Hollywood studios began to require exclusivity of their films to company-owned theatres. The Levoy was sold to Warner Brothers on May 28, 1930. The 1930s brought the first time in history that theatres were built solely for movie use, and Warner Brothers wanted to modernize the Levoy into one of these new movie palaces.

This brought about the third major renovation of the Levoy, in 1939. Different than the other renovations of the Levoy in 1912 and 1927, the 1939 renovation was not an enlargement. Instead, it was mostly a cosmetic renovation consistent with Warner Brothers’ view of what a modern theatre should be.

A new neon-heavy marquee was constructed; deco-styled front doors with half moon shaped windows replaced the solid wood ones; the lobby was remodeled to create a new "eye flow principle"; the auditorium had new wall tapestries with illustrations of the earth's eastern and western hemispheres on opposing walls; the whole theatre was now "scientifically air conditioned" for the comfort of all patrons; and movies were made ever grander by the enlargement of the movie screen and the utilization of the RCA Company's new "Sound Apex" system.

With its grand reopening on August 18, 1939, the Levoy had now officially entered the Golden Age of motion pictures.

The popularity of television in the 1950s brought the entertainment and news, previously exclusive to theatres, into everyone's living rooms for free. The TV competition, combined with the Federal Government antitrust crackdown on Hollywood's stranglehold on distribution, caused studio profits to drop significantly. In an effort to cut their losses, the Studios began divesting themselves of real estate and in 1952 Warner Brothers sold to Eugene Mori, owner of the Landis Theater in Vineland.

=== "Uncle" Simon Cherivtch ===
During the next six years the Levoy's slow but steady decline continued. The theatre was now a losing business, and the Levoy's ownership changed again, this time to Simon Cherivtch, businessman and former Millville Mayor. Simon took control on August 28, 1958, and quickly made his message clear on what he planned for the Levoy.

He stated that if attendance kept declining he would find another use for the building, possibly a supermarket or small shopping center. This was a serious threat to the Levoy, since everybody knew that Cherivtch had bought the Peoples’ Theatre in the early 1950s, closed it, and converted it into a modern store.

Cherivtch made several initial attempts to increase attendance, including an attempt to revive live performances with such acts as former Vaudevillians Olson & Johnson's "New Hellz-a-Poppin’ Yock and Roll Revue of 1959" and risking arrest for violating local "Blue Laws" by threatening to open on Sunday, February 22, 1959.

Throughout the 1960s Cherivtch tried many times to bolster Levoy crowds and revenues. He started parades complete with elephants!, gave silver dollars out to children at Saturday matinees, created hype that the Beatles would be at the theatre during the peak of Beatlemania in 1964, and had lottery drawings for ticket stub holders. Many of the matinee kids soon gave him the nickname "Uncle Simon" because of all of his generous schemes.

Tiring of trying to maintain an unprofitable business, in the early 1960s Cherivtch modified the front part of the building by removing most of the lobby, the south staircase and several rows of seats in the auditorium to create two retail shops.

Cherivtch tried several times to sell or lease the Levoy to groups like the Jaycees or even to regional theatre circuits, but all were unsuccessful in running the theatre and the title eventually went back to Simon.

The early 1970s brought a new round of problems to the Levoy. The general flight of patrons from the downtown to the new shopping mall combined with two Multiplex cinemas opening in Vineland was taking away much business. But worst of all, because of low revenues, basic maintenance and upkeep began to slide. The building and its systems started to deteriorate. In 1972 the Levoy closed for several months "for alterations" when the first major exterior alteration occurred.

The large wood eave façade that hung high above the marquee was hanging out some 10-12 inches from the building. This was ordered removed— and was, on July 7, 1972.

Soon afterward the four wooden pilasters were also taken down, leaving only wood beams to show where these decorative elements once stood. The 1972 shutdown and renovation were only temporary setbacks because the Levoy would soon reopen, but it was a sign of things to come.

=== Closure ===
The seats were old, the balcony was often closed, and movies were all second run, but it was still open for business, this time until July 1974. Once again problems with electric, wiring, heating, and the leaky roof were cited as problems.

For the next four months the Levoy's new lessee, Seymour "Sy" Siegal, planned an optimistic comeback for Millville's 66-year-old theatre. Improvements were made, promotions like the 5¢ movie were brought back, and the Levoy's occupancy permit was granted on November 13, 1974. This temporary reopening lasted for a month, and then an extra week was added on.

This stop and go game with City Hall came to an end on December 24, 1974, when the Levoy was permanently closed because of the lack of substantial improvements. This put an end to Sy Siegal's efforts, and once again the title went back to Simon Cherivtch.

The theatre was threatened with demolition in October 1976 when The Levoy's lessee, Theatre VI Corporation of Long Island, was given 60 days to make minimum safety repairs on the building before the city would undertake demolition proceedings. Demolition never occurred, due to logistical, legal and financial issues.

=== Blaze Diegidio ===
Cherivtch met Blaze Diegidio of Bucks County, Pennsylvania, and persuaded him to buy the old theatre in 1980.

At first Blaze had planned to renovate the Levoy into a mini-mall, but these plans never formulated and for several more years the Levoy was boarded up.

In the mid-1980s, the store space on the ground floor was reopened for leasing, and the second floor mezzanine was torn out to create residential apartments.

On August 6, 1994, Blaze opened the Levoy for a tour to a group of interested citizens. It was this tour that convinced the group that there was enough of the theatre left to warrant the formation of a grass-roots organization to restore and reopen the theatre.

== Levoy Theatre Preservation Society (LTPS) ==
In 1995, Joseph Pierce Jr., one of those who had been on Blaze's Levoy tour convinced his father Joseph Pierce Sr. and friend Jeffrey Page that something needed to be done to preserve the Levoy Theatre. The three formed the Levoy Theatre Preservation Society as a non-profit corporation.

When Blaze Diegidio was first contacted by the LTPS about selling the Levoy, Blaze was reluctant to deal with a non-profit organization—-probably fearing that he would not be able to recoup his expenses. For the next 3 years, Mr. Diegidio took the LTPS on a roller coaster ride of joy and despair with his capricious attitude regarding the sale of the Levoy, until his death in 1998. Eager to relieve themselves of a white elephant and gain some significant tax breaks in the process, Diegidio's survivors sold of the Levoy to the LTPS.

As new owners of the Levoy, the LTPS successfully applied to have the property listed on the State of New Jersey and National Register of Historic Places in August 1998 and began fundraising and stabilization efforts.

Joseph Pierce Jr, died in a swimming accident at Millville's Union Lake in July 2000 and the organization struggled for years to recover from the loss.

In 2008, a partnership was formed between the Levoy Theatre Preservation Society and a local community theatre group, The Off Broad Street Players, led by local attorneys and arts enthusiasts Phillip and (his daughter) Lauren Van Embden. Together these groups began a campaign entitled the Levoy Renaissance Project, which was to give fuel to the capital fundraising mission to salvage the dilapidated shell of a building and bring performing and screen arts back to downtown Millville. In spite of the economic downturn from the housing market collapse, there was enough public sentiment in favor of the project, and enough perseverance from the new leadership to accomplish what had been impossible for decades.

The next two years were spent simultaneously planning every detail of construction from seating layout and acoustics to carpet color and dressing room design, while assembling a highly complex multimillion-dollar financial package. Funding was sourced from a combination of tax credits, private and public funds and was finally completed in April 2010. Work on the restoration of the theatre began shortly thereafter.

== Reconstruction ==
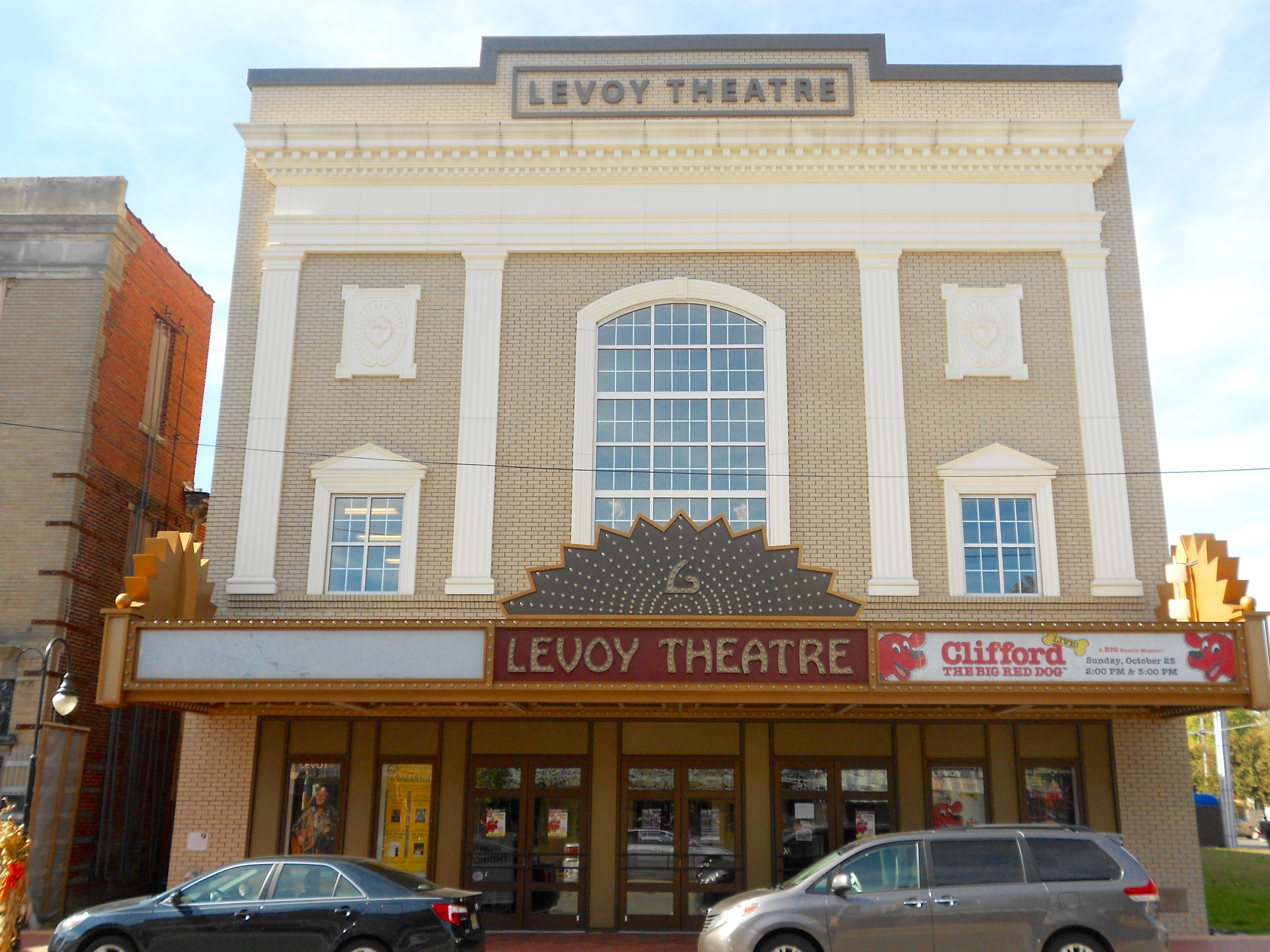
The reconstructed theater

The renovation project suffered a setback on January 3, 2011. A section of the building's north wall collapsed, followed by the front wall, leaving most of the 100-year-old structure in rubble. One building nearby was deemed a total loss due to damage from the collapse. One firefighter, already on the scene investigating a gas leak prior to the incident, was struck and injured by falling debris.

The Levoy Theatre construction renovation project restarted in May 2011, five months after the partial collapse, and continued until August 2012. The facade and marquee of the theater was replicated to match an incarnation of the theater from the late 1920s, and much of the interior of the theater has been modeled and matched to the historic features of the century-old venue. Upon entering is a small lobby, followed by a larger ground-floor lobby and a grand staircase leading to a mezzanine lobby. The new theater seats about 700 patrons, has state-of-art sound and lighting, and a levitating orchestra pit.

== Re-opening ==
The Levoy Theatre successfully re-opened on September 9, 2012, with a performance by the Peacherine Ragtime Orchestra underscoring the films of Charlie Chaplin and Buster Keaton, just like the original Levoy offered.

The Levoy Theatre's official grand opening gala took place on September 22, 2012. The gala began with a reception, followed by the premier of the play "Roundabout: A New Amusement", by Jim Cook Jr. which chronicled the history of the 1912 opening. A concert by resident theatre company, The Off Broad Street Players along with professional theater actors and singers closed the evening.

== Removal From Historic Registers ==
The building was listed on the National Register of Historic Places in 1998. A local group, which had issues with the building's tax exempt status as a historic place, petitioned the State of New Jersey to remove the property from its database following the 2011 collapse. Their argument that there was an insufficient portion left of the building remaining to qualify as a historic place, and any further construction was essentially a new building. On July 17, 2013, the Levoy Theatre was removed from the National Register after being previously removed from the New Jersey Register of Historic Places.
