= Join My Cult =

2004 novel by James Curcio

- Author: James Curcio
- Language: English
- Genre: Satire, Novel
- Publisher: New Falcon Publications
- Publication date: November 2004
- Publication place: United States
- Media type: Print (Paperback)
- Pages: 256 pp
- ISBN: 1-56184-173-0
- OCLC: 150358223

Join My Cult is a satirical novel written by James Curcio and released by New Falcon Publications. It is a work of collaborative fiction based on real events. In a subsequent interview the author said the book was meant as a prelude to his second novel, Party At The World's End.

== Plot summary ==
Various plot elements focus on groups of suburban kids experimenting with shamanism and hallucinogens, who quickly discover themselves unhinged from the culture around them. It details events surrounding their harrowing plunge into this abyss, regularly shifting narrator and frame of reference from one member of the group to the other. Curcio utilizes atypical narrative and grammatical structures in the form of neurolinguistic and hypnotic confusion techniques within the text in an effort to stimulate a similar experience over the course of reading. That Curcio was intentionally utilizing these techniques is shown in various interviews such as a Gpod radio interview found on his website.

== Reviews ==
The book received a positive review from Jive Magazine.

== About the author ==
Born Jamie Curcio (July 9, 1978, Philadelphia, Pennsylvania), Curcio has published numerous novels, graphic novels, essays, albums and podcasts independently as well as through Disinfo, New Falcon, Alterati, Key 64, JIVE Magazine, Immanion Press, and New Fiction. Many of these projects use heavily applied viral marketing, and deal with issues relating to myth, consciousness and identity.

Jamie Curcio co-starred in a 2012 independent film and webseries, Clark: A Gonzomentary which received an Outstanding Lead Actor Award, and Outstanding Writing Award for the web series version from LA Webfest 2013 and was nominated for a Best Documentary award at the Sixth Annual Philadelphia Independent Film Festival for the full-length film version.
