= Stephen O. Garrison =

Methodist minister

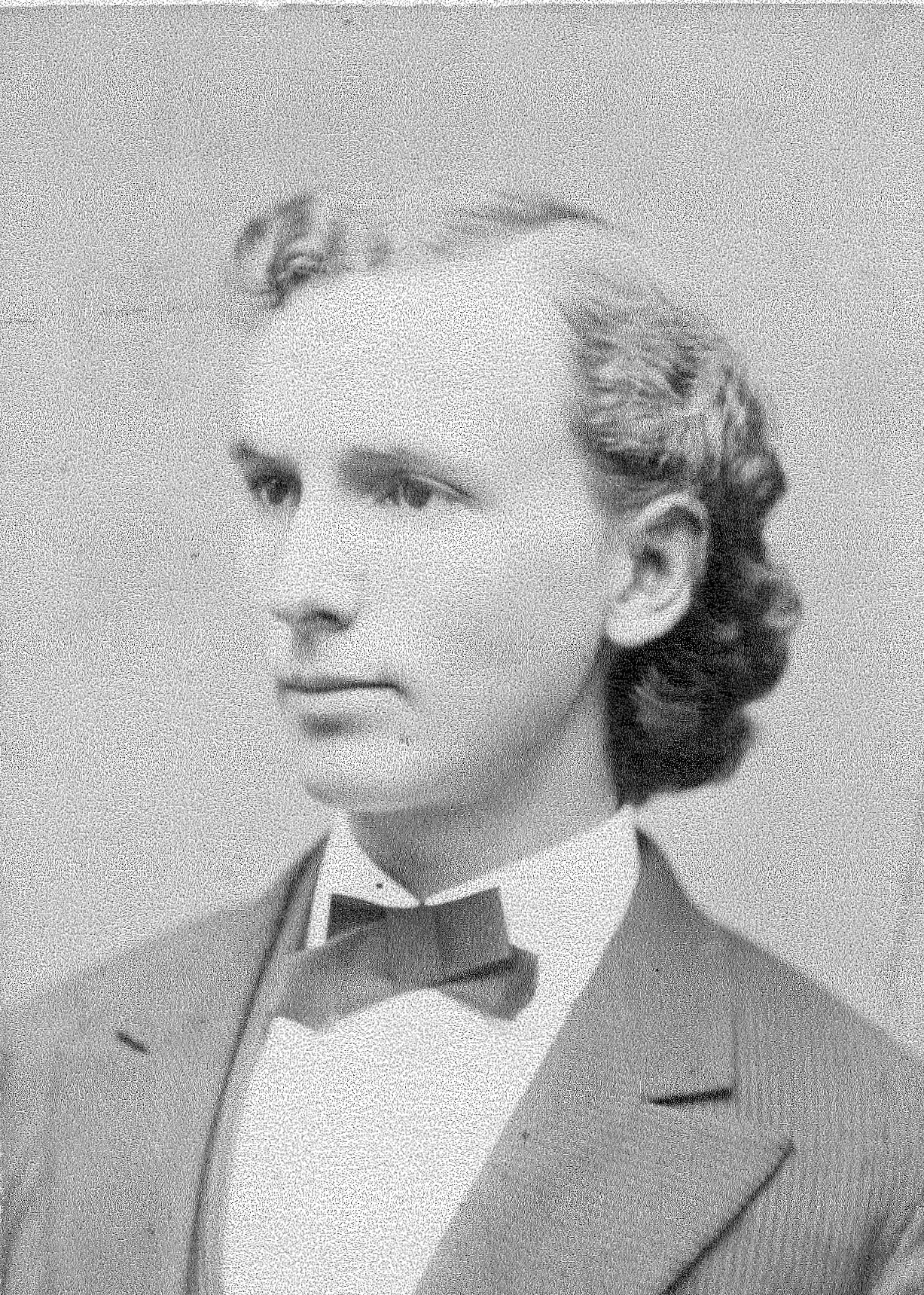
Stephen Olin Garrison, circa 1880. Courtesy Garrison Family Collection.

Stephen Olin Garrison (1853–1900) was a Methodist minister and scholar who developed The Probationer's Catechism for Methodist probationary members and founded The Training School in Vineland, New Jersey.

== Personal life ==
Garrison was born in Millville, New Jersey, on December 24, 1853. He was the tenth child of Stephen Ayars Garrison (1806–1869), a minister and New Jersey state legislator, and Elizabeth Coombs (1812–1888). In 1872, he graduated from the Pennington Seminary, a college preparatory school. He went on to Wesleyan University in Middletown, Connecticut, earning a B.A. in 1876 and a Master's in 1879. Afterwards, he attended the Drew Theological Seminary in Madison, New Jersey.

Garrison married Elizabeth Baldwin August 29, 1879, with whom he had four children; Charles Henry (1880), Norman Scott (1882), Ida Richardson (1884), and Frances Willard (1887). Between 1879 and 1887, Garrison served as a minister in several Methodist congregations in New Jersey and Pennsylvania. During his ministry in Philadelphia, he published two books; The Probationer's Catechism (sometimes called the Probationer’s Handbook) and Forty Witnesses. The former has been one of the most widely used catechisms for probationers seeking full membership in a Methodist connexion. The latter was originally published in 1888.

Another notable achievement of Garrison centered on care and education of intellectually disabled children. In 1888, Garrison created what came to be known as the Training School at Vineland (described below). Ten years later, he began to suffer from an undisclosed illness. In early 1900 he had surgery in Philadelphia. The surgery was deemed a success and he returned home, but he never fully recovered. He died on April 17, 1900, surrounded by friends and family. He was 46 years old.

== The Training School ==
Garrison had a long-standing concern for people with intellectual disabilities. Two of his siblings were considered "feeble-minded," as the disabled were then called. In the 1840s, his father had tried, unsuccessfully, to pass legislation requiring New Jersey to provide care for citizens with intellectual disabilities. During the younger Garrison's time in Pennsylvania, he began planning a private school for children with these disabilities.

By 1887, Garrison and his family had returned to Millville, New Jersey. With no public institution to care for the intellectually disabled, Garrison and his wife Elizabeth opened their home to seven children in need. Many more families sought their help, which would have exceeded the capacity of their house. Garrison, began to raise money for a larger facility. Vineland, New Jersey, philanthropist, B.D. Maxham was willing to donate a property called the Scarborough Mansion, which sat on 40 acres. Garrison used the mansion and other cash donations to open what was initially called The New Jersey Home for the Education and Care of Feeble-minded Children. Not long after, the school was renamed The New Jersey Training School and later The Training School at Vineland.

Garrison became the school's first superintendent. On March 1, 1888, the seven students living in Garrison's home were transferred to the new facility. By the end of the year, the school had 55 boys and girls in residence. By 1893, the Vineland School employed 11 teachers and had 200 residents. At the time of his death, the Training School had grown to 170 acres and had ten buildings with an estimated worth of $200,000.

Garrison insisted that children be treated with kindness and respect. He believed that they should be taught practical skills so they could lead independent lives. Rather than being housed in dormitories, Garrison believed children should live in smaller, free-standing houses that more closely approximated family life. In 1892, he began moving students into “cottages.” Garrison's approach, which became known as “The Cottage Plan,” came to dominate thinking on custodial care. He diversified the school's curriculum and created a medical staff including a neurologist, an ophthalmologist, a gynecologist, a pathologist, an otologist, a laryngologist, and specialists in speech defects. But Garrison's interests extended beyond the needs of children.

Garrison was instrumental in creating the Vineland Institution for Feeble-minded Women. It provided custodian care for adults and opened in 1888, just across the street from the Training School. He served for six months as that Institution's superintendent until a permanent replacement was selected. In the late nineteenth century, the treatment of epilepsy was in its infancy. In 1896, Garrison persuaded the New Jersey Legislature to appropriate $58,000 to create the State Village for Epileptics in Skillman, New Jersey. Garrison served as a Trustee and Secretary of that institution until his death.

By 1898, Garrison realized that his health was failing, and began a search for someone who could carry on his work at the Training School. He chose Edward R. Johnstone, the Principal of instruction at a similar institution in Indiana. Johnstone, became Vice Principal at Vineland and, upon Garrison's death, succeeded him as Principal. In 1902, he was named superintendent and served in that capacity until his death in 1945. In a 1988 history of the Training School at Vineland, Eugene Dol argued, “it is probably not an exaggeration to say that for the first half of the 20th century it dominated the field of mental retardation worldwide.”
