= Millville, New Jersey =

City in Cumberland County, New Jersey, US

- City
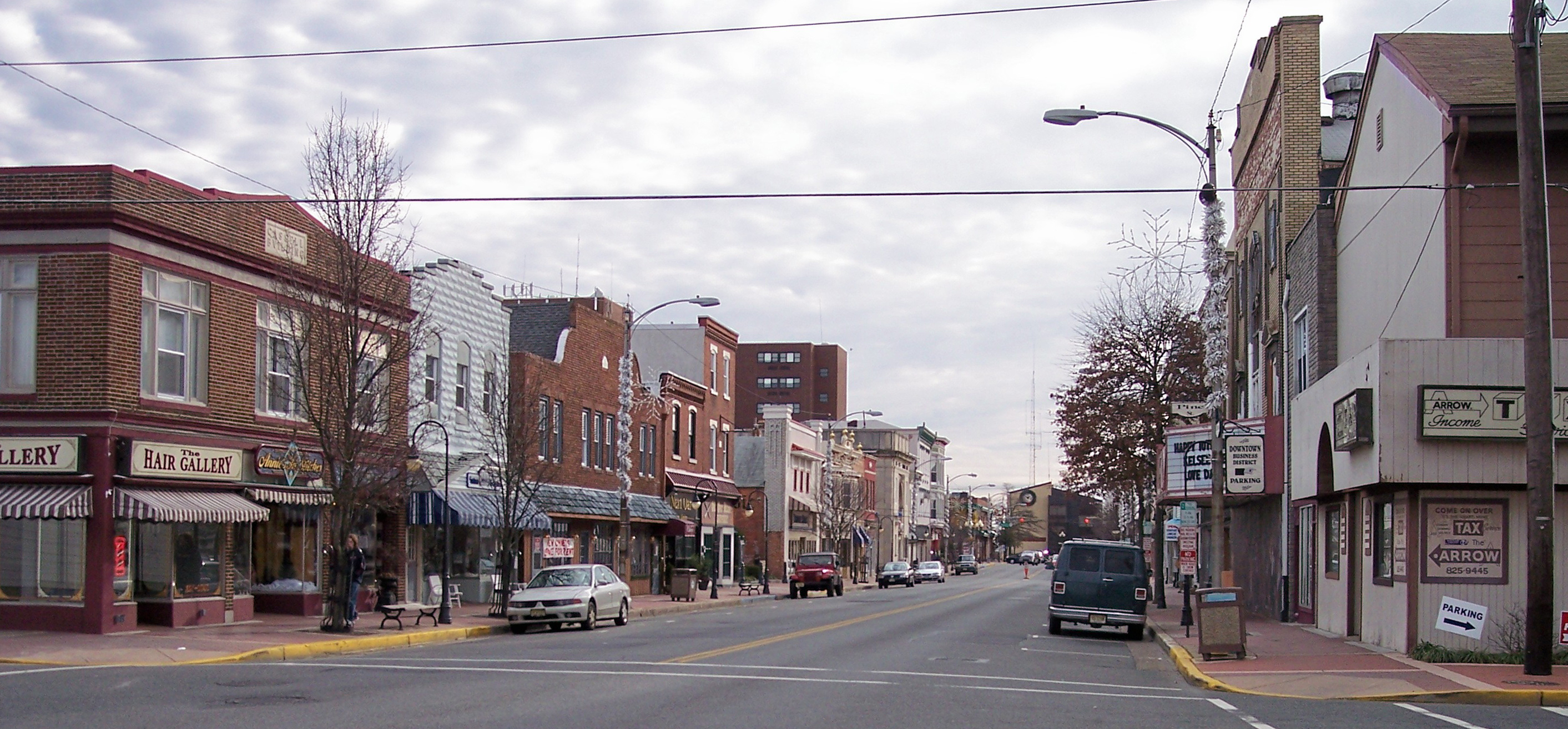
- High Street in downtown Millville in 2006

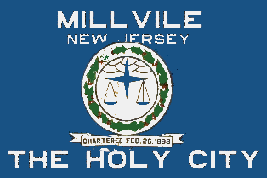
- Flag Seal
- Nickname: "The Holly City of America"
- Map of Millville highlighted within Cumberland County. Right: Location of Cumberland County in New Jersey.

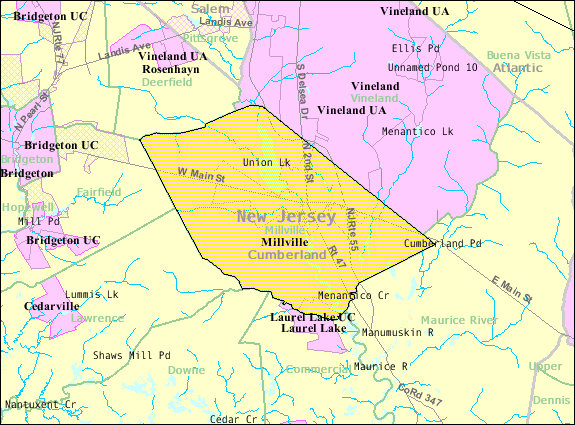
- Census Bureau map of Millville, New Jersey

- Location in Cumberland County Location in New Jersey Location in the United States
- Coordinates: 39.390093°N 75.054797°W
- Country: United States
- State: New Jersey
- County: Cumberland
- Founded: c. 1720
- Incorporated: February 24, 1801 (as Township)
- Reincorporated: March 1, 1866 (as City)

Government
  - Type: Walsh Act
  - Body: Board of Commissioners
  - Mayor: Benjamin J. Romanik (term ends December 31, 2025)
  - Administrator: Joseph Calchi
  - Municipal clerk: Jeanne Parkinson

Area
  - Total: 44.50 sq mi (115.25 km^{2})
  - Land: 42.00 sq mi (108.78 km^{2})
  - Water: 2.50 sq mi (6.47 km^{2}) 5.62%
  - Rank: 43rd of 565 in state 4th of 14 in county
- Elevation: 43 ft (13 m)

Population (2020)
  - Total: 27,491
  - Estimate (2023): 27,358
  - Rank: 91st of 565 in state 2nd of 14 in county
  - Density: 654.6/sq mi (252.7/km^{2})
  - Rank: 424th of 565 in state 3rd of 14 in county
- Time zone: UTC−05:00 (Eastern (EST))
  - Summer (DST): UTC−04:00 (Eastern (EDT))
- ZIP Code: 08332
- Area code: 856
- FIPS code: 3401146680
- GNIS feature ID: 0885304
- Website: millvillenj.gov

Millville is a city in Cumberland County, in the U.S. state of New Jersey. As of the 2020 United States census, the city's population was 27,491, a decrease of 909 (−3.2%) from the 2010 census count of 28,400, which in turn reflected an increase of 1,553 (+5.8%) from the 26,847 counted in the 2000 census.

Millville was originally incorporated as a township by an act of the New Jersey Legislature on February 24, 1801, from portions of Fairfield Township. Portions of the township were taken to form Landis Township on March 7, 1864. Millville was reincorporated as a city on March 1, 1866, based on the results of a referendum passed that same day. The city derives its name from a proposal to create a mill town in the area.

Millville is part of the South Jersey region of the state and is located within the Vineland-Bridgeton metropolitan statistical area, and it is ultimately part of the larger Philadelphia metropolitan area.

== History ==
Millville in the 1950s

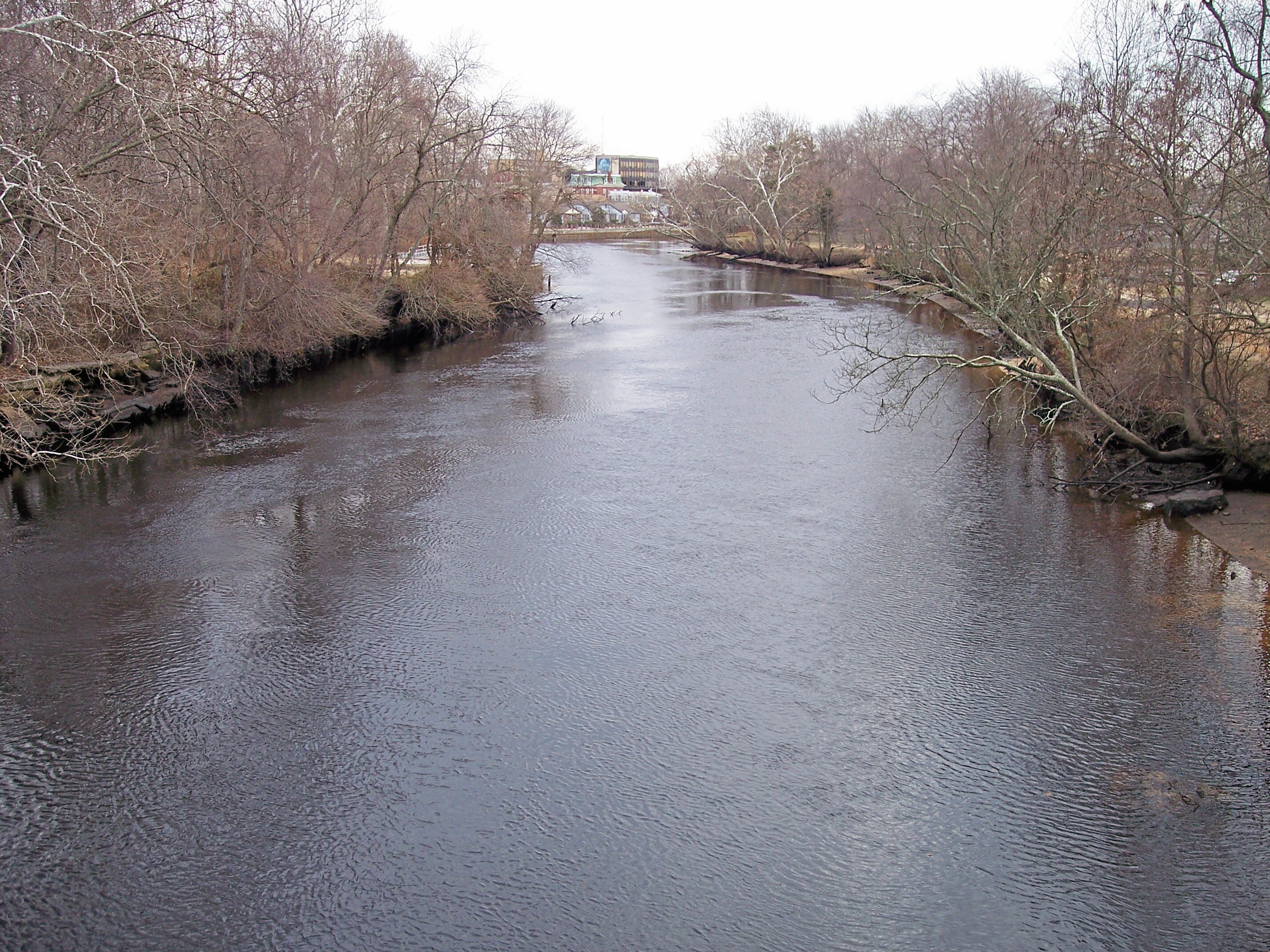
The Maurice River in Millville in 2006

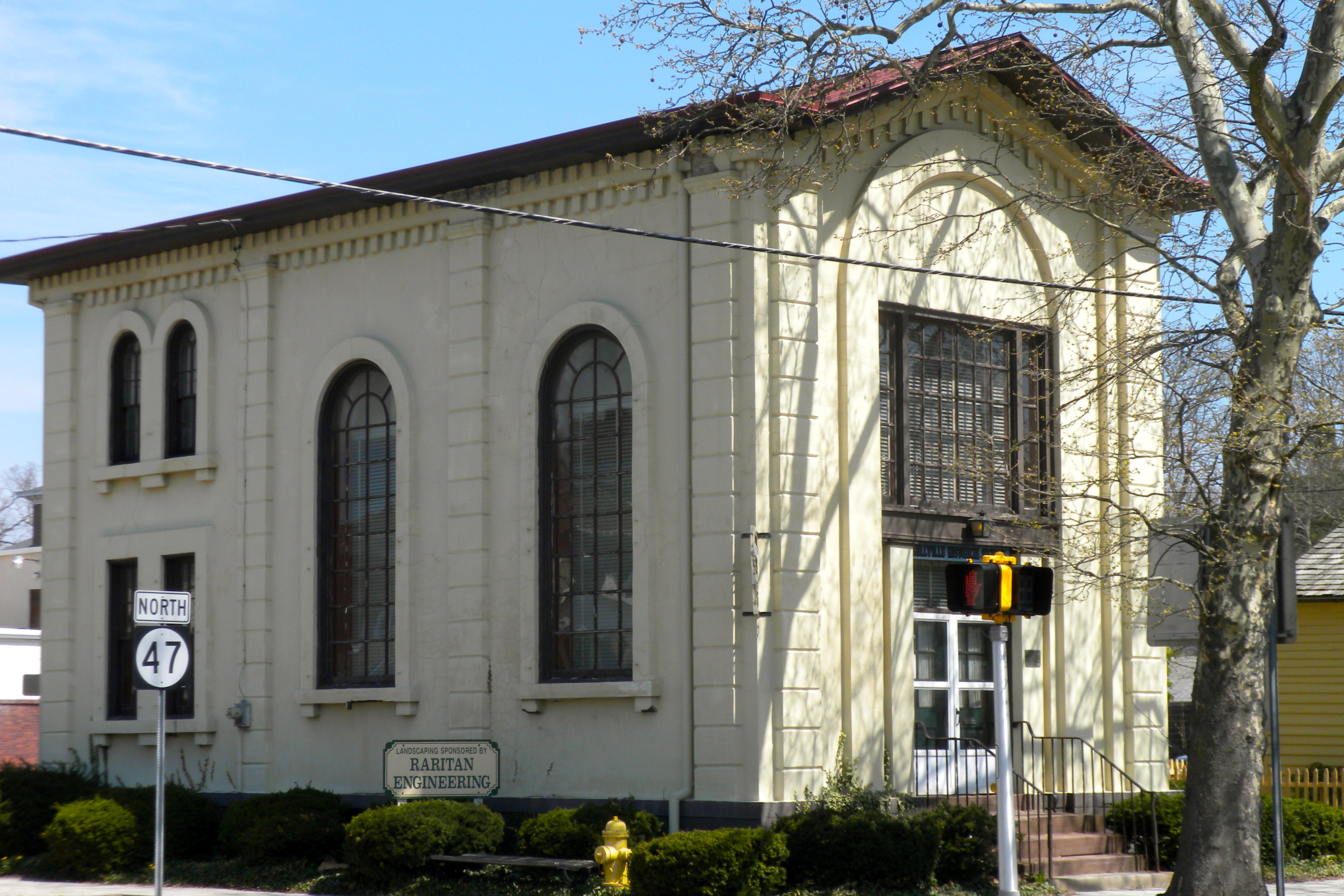
Millville's First Bank Building

Around 1720, a sawmill was believed to have existed at Leaming's Mill, known as "Shingle Landing" in its earliest days. The area also had a public road, a boat landing, and a bridge-like structure.

In 1790, Joseph Smith and Henry Drinker purchased 24,000 acres (97 km^{2}) of land known as the Union Mills Tract. They formed the Union Estates Company, built lumber mills along the Maurice River and established a dam to power these new mills. Joseph Buck, an American Revolutionary War veteran who served under General George Washington, was part of a group that purchased the land in the area in 1795 and laid out the plans for what would become Millville.

In 1806, an Irish immigrant, James Lee, opened the area's first glass factory, making use of the large amounts of silica sand and the ample wood that could be used to operate the plant.

In the early 1850s, the Smith and Wood Iron Foundry and New Jersey Mills were constructed. In 1860, a bleachery and dye house were added to New Jersey Mills, which then became Millville Manufacturing. David Wood then constructed a dam, forming the largest man-made lake in the state, which powered the entire manufacturing organization. By 1870, the mill had 600 employees, and in 40 years this number doubled.

In 1862, Charles K. Landis laid out the city of Vineland about 2.5 miles (4.0 km) east of the Maurice River. In 1864, Vineland was separated from Millville Township and joined the new Landis Township.

In 1936, the town was the site of Roosevelt Park, a project proposed by Effie Maud Aldrich Morrison as the country's first housing development for the elderly. The retirement colony was built on land which had been repossessed by the town of Millville for back taxes, and became known as the "Roosevelt Colony". It was later renamed to the "Roosevelt Park" old age colony, and was sometimes referred to as the Colony for the Aged at Roosevelt Park and Roosevelt Park Colony for Aged. When it opened on October 23, 1936, it became the first senior citizens retirement colony in the United States.

Millville Airport was dedicated "America's First Defense Airport" on August 2, 1941, by local, state, and federal officials. In less than a year, construction of military base facilities began, and in January 1943, the Millville Army Air Field opened as a gunnery school for fighter pilots. Gunnery training began with Curtiss P-40 Warhawk aircraft, but after a few weeks was changed over to the Republic P-47 Thunderbolt. During its three-year existence, thousands of soldiers and civilians served here, with about 1,500 pilots receiving advanced fighter training in the Thunderbolt.

Following World War II, the airfield was declared excess to the government's needs, and returned to the City of Millville. Most of the airport buildings were converted to apartments for the many veterans returning from the war. The last of the apartments vanished in the early 1970s, and the airport soon became a hub of industry and aviation for Southern New Jersey.

Up to the late 1990s the Millville downtown area was depressed and somewhat isolated, as illustrated by the abandoned Levoy Theatre and Wheaton Glass Factory, with investors reluctant to venture in its development. Major redevelopment has occurred in the past several years, establishing the scenic Riverfront and Downtown areas into an artists' haven, including many studios, shops, and restaurants. Older abandoned buildings have been restored, and continued major development is planned.

Millville has an arts district named the Glasstown Arts District. A public art center with galleries and studios is the hub of activity, and is open six days a week. The district includes seven full-time galleries, along with ten part-time galleries and studios, which are open mostly on weekends and on the third Friday of each month. Wheaton Arts and the Creative Glass Center of America includes a major collection of early American glass with contemporary glass from CGCA Fellows and working glass artists in a restored 19th century glass factory. Opened in 1908 and closed in 1974 with declining numbers of customers, the Levoy Theatre re-opened in September 2012.

One of Millville's claims to fame is an original paperweight making technique which originated there. Fine paperweights from the classic period (1845–1870) were made with one of three techniques: millefiori, lampwork or cameo incrustations (sulphides). In the first decade of the twentieth century, crimp flowers, mostly roses, originated in Millville, with several glassworkers making them in their off duty time. These paperweights are commonly called "Millville roses", even when sometimes made elsewhere.

== Geography ==
According to the U.S. Census Bureau, the city had a total area of 44.50 square miles (115.25 km^{2}), including 42.00 square miles (108.78 km^{2}) of land and 2.50 square miles (6.47 km^{2}) of water (5.62%). Unincorporated communities, localities and place names located partially or completely within the city include Clarks Mill, Farmingdale, Manatico, North Newark and Union Lake.

The city borders the Cumberland County municipalities of Commercial Township, Deerfield Township, Downe Township, Fairfield Township, Lawrence Township, Maurice River Township and Vineland.

Millville lies between the southern termini of the New Jersey Turnpike, the Garden State Parkway, Route 55 (which runs through the northeastern portion of the city) and the Atlantic City Expressway.

=== Climate ===
The city has a humid subtropical climate (Cfa) and the hardiness zone is 7a bordering 6b.

Climate data for Millville Executive Airport, New Jersey (1991–2020 normals, extremes 1947–present)
| Month | Jan | Feb | Mar | Apr | May | Jun | Jul | Aug | Sep | Oct | Nov | Dec | Year |
|---|---|---|---|---|---|---|---|---|---|---|---|---|---|
| Record high °F (°C) | 74 (23) | 76 (24) | 86 (30) | 93 (34) | 96 (36) | 100 (38) | 103 (39) | 101 (38) | 97 (36) | 97 (36) | 84 (29) | 77 (25) | 103 (39) |
| Mean daily maximum °F (°C) | 42.2 (5.7) | 44.6 (7.0) | 52.3 (11.3) | 63.7 (17.6) | 72.9 (22.7) | 81.6 (27.6) | 86.1 (30.1) | 84.3 (29.1) | 78.0 (25.6) | 66.9 (19.4) | 56.1 (13.4) | 46.7 (8.2) | 64.6 (18.1) |
| Daily mean °F (°C) | 33.0 (0.6) | 34.6 (1.4) | 41.8 (5.4) | 52.1 (11.2) | 61.7 (16.5) | 70.9 (21.6) | 76.2 (24.6) | 74.3 (23.5) | 67.6 (19.8) | 55.9 (13.3) | 45.5 (7.5) | 37.3 (2.9) | 54.2 (12.3) |
| Mean daily minimum °F (°C) | 23.8 (−4.6) | 24.6 (−4.1) | 31.4 (−0.3) | 40.6 (4.8) | 50.4 (10.2) | 60.2 (15.7) | 66.2 (19.0) | 64.4 (18.0) | 57.2 (14.0) | 45.0 (7.2) | 34.9 (1.6) | 27.9 (−2.3) | 43.9 (6.6) |
| Record low °F (°C) | −10 (−23) | −6 (−21) | −7 (−22) | 17 (−8) | 29 (−2) | 40 (4) | 44 (7) | 44 (7) | 35 (2) | 21 (−6) | 12 (−11) | 2 (−17) | −10 (−23) |
| Average precipitation inches (mm) | 3.13 (80) | 2.63 (67) | 4.09 (104) | 3.53 (90) | 3.12 (79) | 3.91 (99) | 4.26 (108) | 4.61 (117) | 3.15 (80) | 3.82 (97) | 3.17 (81) | 3.95 (100) | 43.37 (1,102) |
| Average precipitation days (≥ 0.01 in) | 8.9 | 9.3 | 10.5 | 11.1 | 10.6 | 10.0 | 9.8 | 8.9 | 8.4 | 8.6 | 8.3 | 10.3 | 114.7 |
Source: NOAA

== Demographics ==
Historical population
| Census | Pop. | Note | %± |
|---|---|---|---|
| 1810 | 1,032 | | — |
| 1820 | 1,010 | | −2.1% |
| 1830 | 1,559 | | 54.4% |
| 1840 | 1,771 | | 13.6% |
| 1850 | 2,332 | | 31.7% |
| 1860 | 3,932 | | 68.6% |
| 1870 | 6,101 | * | 55.2% |
| 1880 | 7,660 | | 25.6% |
| 1890 | 10,002 | | 30.6% |
| 1900 | 10,583 | | 5.8% |
| 1910 | 12,451 | | 17.7% |
| 1920 | 14,691 | | 18.0% |
| 1930 | 14,705 | | 0.1% |
| 1940 | 14,806 | | 0.7% |
| 1950 | 16,041 | | 8.3% |
| 1960 | 19,096 | | 19.0% |
| 1970 | 21,366 | | 11.9% |
| 1980 | 24,815 | | 16.1% |
| 1990 | 25,992 | | 4.7% |
| 2000 | 26,847 | | 3.3% |
| 2010 | 28,400 | | 5.8% |
| 2020 | 27,491 | | −3.2% |
| 2023 (est.) | 27,358 | | −0.5% |
Population sources: 1810–2010 1810–1920; 1840 1850–1890 1850–1870; 1850 1870 1880–1890; 1890–1910 1870–1930; 1900–1990 2000; 2010 2020 * = Lost territory in previous decade.

=== 2020 census ===
As of the 2020 census, Millville had a population of 27,491. The median age was 39.4 years. 23.9% of residents were under the age of 18 and 17.4% of residents were 65 years of age or older. For every 100 females there were 89.3 males, and for every 100 females age 18 and over there were 85.3 males age 18 and over.

83.9% of residents lived in urban areas, while 16.1% lived in rural areas.

There were 10,770 households in Millville, of which 31.3% had children under the age of 18 living in them. Of all households, 37.5% were married-couple households, 18.1% were households with a male householder and no spouse or partner present, and 35.3% were households with a female householder and no spouse or partner present. About 29.5% of all households were made up of individuals and 13.6% had someone living alone who was 65 years of age or older.

There were 11,616 housing units, of which 7.3% were vacant. The homeowner vacancy rate was 2.3% and the rental vacancy rate was 6.4%.

Racial composition as of the 2020 census
| Race | Number | Percent |
|---|---|---|
| White | 15,653 | 56.9% |
| Black or African American | 6,214 | 22.6% |
| American Indian and Alaska Native | 179 | 0.7% |
| Asian | 318 | 1.2% |
| Native Hawaiian and Other Pacific Islander | 2 | 0.0% |
| Some other race | 1,813 | 6.6% |
| Two or more races | 3,312 | 12.0% |
| Hispanic or Latino (of any race) | 5,215 | 19.0% |

=== 2010 census ===
The 2010 United States census counted 28,400 people, 10,648 households, and 7,187 families in the city. The population density was 676.2 per square mile (261.1/km^{2}). There were 11,435 housing units at an average density of 272.3 per square mile (105.1/km^{2}). The racial makeup was 69.04% (19,608) White, 19.83% (5,631) Black or African American, 0.94% (266) Native American, 1.19% (338) Asian, 0.06% (18) Pacific Islander, 5.24% (1,488) from other races, and 3.70% (1,051) from two or more races. Hispanic or Latino of any race were 14.93% (4,239) of the population.

Of the 10,648 households, 30.4% had children under the age of 18; 41.2% were married couples living together; 20.0% had a female householder with no husband present and 32.5% were non-families. Of all households, 26.6% were made up of individuals and 11.1% had someone living alone who was 65 years of age or older. The average household size was 2.65 and the average family size was 3.19.

25.8% of the population were under the age of 18, 9.9% from 18 to 24, 25.1% from 25 to 44, 25.9% from 45 to 64, and 13.2% who were 65 years of age or older. The median age was 36.6 years. For every 100 females, the population had 90.2 males. For every 100 females ages 18 and older there were 85.7 males.

The Census Bureau's 2006–2010 American Community Survey showed that (in 2010 inflation-adjusted dollars) median household income was $44,925 (with a margin of error of +/− $4,459) and the median family income was $55,000 (+/− $4,433). Males had a median income of $46,186 (+/− $3,934) versus $35,336 (+/− $2,860) for females. The per capita income for the city was $23,364 (+/− $1,573). About 16.2% of families and 19.5% of the population were below the poverty line, including 35.2% of those under age 18 and 7.2% of those age 65 or over.

=== 2000 census ===
As of the 2000 United States census, there were 26,847 people, 10,043 households, and 7,010 families residing in the city. The population density was 633.9 inhabitants per square mile (244.8/km^{2}). There were 10,652 housing units at an average density of 251.5 per square mile (97.1/km^{2}). The racial makeup of the city was 76.13% White, 14.99% African American, 0.52% Native American, 0.80% Asian, 0.03% Pacific Islander, 5.16% from other races, and 2.37% from two or more races. Hispanic or Latino of any race were 11.17% of the population.

There were 10,043 households, out of which 35.0% had children under the age of 18 living with them, 46.5% were married couples living together, 17.9% had a female householder with no husband present, and 30.2% were non-families. 25.1% of all households were made up of individuals, and 11.6% had someone living alone who was 65 years of age or older. The average household size was 3.65 and the average family size was 2.15.

In the city, the population was spread out, with 27.9% under the age of 18, 8.6% from 18 to 24, 28.8% from 25 to 44, 21.7% from 45 to 64, and 12.9% who were 65 years of age or older. The median age was 35 years. For every 100 females, there were 89.5 males. For every 100 females age 18 and over, there were 85.3 males.

The median income for a household in the city was $40,378, and the median income for a family was $46,093. Males had a median income of $36,915 versus $26,669 for females. The per capita income for the city was $18,632. About 12.1% of families and 15.2% of the population were below the poverty line, including 21.8% of those under age 18 and 9.7% of those age 65 or over.

Millville has a Ukrainian community and is home to Sts. Peter and Paul Ukrainian Orthodox Church and St. Nicholas Ukrainian Catholic Church.

== Economy ==
Portions of the city are part of a joint Urban Enterprise Zone (UEZ) with Vineland, one of 32 zones covering 37 municipalities statewide. Millville was selected in 1983 as one of the initial group of 10 zones chosen to participate in the program. In addition to other benefits to encourage employment and investment within the Zone, shoppers can take advantage of a reduced 3.3125% sales tax rate (half of the 6 5/8% rate charged statewide) at eligible merchants. Established in October 1988, the city's Urban Enterprise Zone status expires in December 2023.

== Arts and culture ==
Originally opened in 1908, the Levoy Theatre reopened in September 2012 after a 34-year hiatus, with an orchestra on hand playing music to accompany a pair of silent films featuring Charlie Chaplin and Buster Keaton.

== Government ==
=== Local government ===
In 1801, Millville was first organized as a township; It became a city in 1866. Until 1913, Millville operated under a Mayor-Council form of government where the mayor was elected by the people. In 1913, a change of form of government to the Walsh Act was passed and the commission form of government became the way the city was run. The city is one of 30 municipalities (of the 564) statewide that use the commission form of government. Under this form of government as used in Millville, the governing body is comprised of five commissioners who are elected to four-year concurrent terms of office at-large on a non-partisan basis as part of the November general election. At a reorganization meeting held after each election, each commissioner is assigned a department to oversee and one commissioner is selected from among its members to serve as the mayor and another as vice mayor.

In November 2014, Michael Santiago, the city's first Hispanic councilmember, became Millville's first Hispanic mayor.

In January 2022, Lisa Orndorf made history as the first woman to serve as Millville's mayor. In November 2023, Stephen Watson was elected to fill the seat that had been held by James Quinn, who had elected to serve on the Cumberland County Board of County Commissioners. Watson defeated Robert McQuade, who had finished in sixth-place in the 2021 election and had been appointed to fill the vacant seat that had been held by Quinn.

In March 2024, Mayor Lisa Orndorf resigned from the Millville City Commission for health reasons. Commissioner Benjamin Romanik, who was the runner-up to Orndorff in the 2022 mayoral election, was appointed mayor. In April 2024, Millville City Commissioners appointed Marissa Ranello to fill the vacant seat.

As of 2024, the Millville City Commission includes: Mayor Benjamin J. Romanik (Commissioner of Public Affairs), Charles Kirk Hewitt (Commissioner of Public Safety), Joseph Sooy (Commissioner of Revenue and Finance) Marissa Ranello (Commissioner of Parks and Public Property) and Stephen E. Watson Jr. (Commissioner of Public Works)

=== Federal, state, and county representation ===
Millville is located in the 2nd Congressional District and is part of New Jersey's 1st state legislative district.

For the 119th United States Congress, New Jersey's 2nd congressional district is represented by Jeff Van Drew (R, Dennis Township). New Jersey is represented in the United States Senate by Democrats Cory Booker (Newark, term ends 2027) and Andy Kim (Moorestown, term ends 2031).

For the 2026–2027 session, the 1st legislative district of the New Jersey Legislature is represented in the State Senate by Mike Testa (R, Vineland) and in the General Assembly by Antwan McClellan (R, Ocean City) and Erik K. Simonsen (R, Lower Township).

Cumberland County is governed by a Board of County Commissioners composed of seven members who are elected at large by the citizens of Cumberland County in partisan elections and serve staggered three-year terms in office, with either two or three seats coming up for election each year in a three-year cycle. Annually, the seven board members select a Director and Deputy Director for one-year terms. As of 2025, members of the Cumberland County Board of County Commissioners (with party affiliation, residence and term-end year listed in parentheses) are:

Douglas A. Albrecht (R, Vineland, 2025), Deputy Director Antonio Romero (R, Vineland, 2027), Sandra Taylor (R, Downe Township; 2026), Victoria Groetsch-Lods (R, Vineland, 2025), Arthur Marchand (R, Hopewell Township, 2026), James Sauro (R, Vineland, 2026) and Robert A. Austino (D, Bridgeton, 2027).

The county's constitutional officers are: Clerk Celeste Riley (D, Bridgeton, 2029), Sheriff Michael Donato (R, Bridgeton, 2026) and Surrogate Rudolph Luisi (R, Vineland, 2028).

=== Politics ===
As of March 2011, there were a total of 17,500 registered voters in Millville, of which 4,652 (26.6%) were registered as Democrats, 2,802 (16.0%) were registered as Republicans and 10,033 (57.3%) were registered as Unaffiliated. There were 13 voters registered as Libertarians or Greens.

Gubernatorial election results for Millville
| Year | Republican | | Democratic | | Third party(ies) | |
| Year | No. | % | No. | % | No. | % |
|---|---|---|---|---|---|---|
| 2025 | 3,843 | 47.11% | 4,249 | 52.09% | 65 | 0.80% |
| 2021 | 3,494 | 55.18% | 2,770 | 43.75% | 68 | 1.07% |
| 2017 | 2,518 | 41.89% | 3,292 | 54.77% | 201 | 3.34% |
| 2013 | 3,794 | 57.44% | 2,640 | 39.97% | 171 | 2.59% |
| 2009 | 2,675 | 41.44% | 3,169 | 49.09% | 611 | 9.47% |
| 2005 | 2,387 | 39.93% | 3,463 | 57.93% | 128 | 2.14% |

In the 2012 presidential election, Democrat Barack Obama received 60.6% of the vote (6,653 cast), ahead of Republican Mitt Romney with 38.1% (4,182 votes), and other candidates with 1.3% (146 votes), among the 11,074 ballots cast by the city's 18,821 registered voters (93 ballots were spoiled), for a turnout of 58.8%. In the 2008 presidential election, Democrat Barack Obama received 57.6% of the vote (6,523 cast), ahead of Republican John McCain, who received 39.8% (4,515 votes), with 11,330 ballots cast among the city's 17,715 registered voters, for a turnout of 64.0%. In the 2004 presidential election, Democrat John Kerry received 50.9% of the vote (5,082 ballots cast), outpolling Republican George W. Bush, who received around 46.8% (4,677 votes), with 9,992 ballots cast among the city's 15,685 registered voters, for a turnout percentage of 63.7.

United States presidential election results for Millville 2024 2020 2016 2012 2008 2004
| Year | Republican | | Democratic | | Third party(ies) | |
| Year | No. | % | No. | % | No. | % |
|---|---|---|---|---|---|---|
| 2024 | 5,706 | 50.60% | 5,455 | 48.37% | 116 | 1.03% |
| 2020 | 5,819 | 46.57% | 6,506 | 52.06% | 171 | 1.37% |
| 2016 | 5,025 | 47.13% | 5,253 | 49.27% | 384 | 3.60% |
| 2012 | 4,182 | 38.08% | 6,653 | 60.59% | 146 | 1.33% |
| 2008 | 4,515 | 39.85% | 6,523 | 57.57% | 292 | 2.58% |
| 2004 | 4,677 | 46.81% | 5,082 | 50.86% | 233 | 2.33% |

In the 2013 gubernatorial election, Republican Chris Christie received 57.4% of the vote (3,794 cast), ahead of Democrat Barbara Buono with 40.0% (2,640 votes), and other candidates with 2.6% (171 votes), among the 6,854 ballots cast by the city's 17,941 registered voters (249 ballots were spoiled), for a turnout of 38.2%. In the 2009 gubernatorial election, Democrat Jon Corzine received 48.4% of the vote (3,169 ballots cast), ahead of both Republican Chris Christie with 40.9% (2,675 votes) and Independent Chris Daggett with 6.9% (453 votes), with 6,541 ballots cast among the city's 17,167 registered voters, yielding a 38.1% turnout.

United States Senate election results for Millville1
| Year | Republican | | Democratic | | Third party(ies) | |
| Year | No. | % | No. | % | No. | % |
|---|---|---|---|---|---|---|
| 2024 | 5,027 | 47.92% | 5,166 | 49.24% | 298 | 2.84% |
| 2018 | 3,809 | 49.57% | 3,574 | 46.51% | 301 | 3.92% |
| 2012 | 3,431 | 34.69% | 6,230 | 62.99% | 230 | 2.33% |
| 2006 | 2,633 | 45.56% | 2,991 | 51.76% | 155 | 2.68% |

United States Senate election results for Millville2
| Year | Republican | | Democratic | | Third party(ies) | |
| Year | No. | % | No. | % | No. | % |
|---|---|---|---|---|---|---|
| 2020 | 5,346 | 43.99% | 6,401 | 52.67% | 405 | 3.33% |
| 2014 | 2,447 | 45.58% | 2,813 | 52.40% | 108 | 2.01% |
| 2013 | 1,666 | 51.06% | 1,548 | 47.44% | 49 | 1.50% |
| 2008 | 3,649 | 36.87% | 5,945 | 60.07% | 302 | 3.05% |

== Education ==
=== Primary and secondary ===
The Millville Public Schools serves students in pre-kindergarten through twelfth grade. The district is one of 31 former Abbott districts statewide that were established pursuant to the decision by the New Jersey Supreme Court in Abbott v. Burke which are now referred to as "SDA Districts" based on the requirement for the state to cover all costs for school building and renovation projects in these districts under the supervision of the New Jersey Schools Development Authority.

As of the 2021–22 school year, the district, comprised of nine schools, had an enrollment of 5,107 students and 433.5 classroom teachers (on an FTE basis), for a student–teacher ratio of 11.8:1. Schools in the district (with 2021–22 enrollment data from the National Center for Education Statistics) are Child Family Center with 520 students in PreK, R. M. Bacon Elementary School with 262 students in grades K-5, Holly Heights Elementary School with 487 students in grades K-5, Mount Pleasant Elementary School with 173 students in grades K-5, Rieck Avenue Elementary School with 415 students in grades K-5, Silver Run Elementary School with 423 students in grades K-5, Lakeside Middle School with 999 students in grades 6-8 and Millville Senior High School with a total 1,638 students in grades 9-12; Thunderbolt Academy is a partnership between Millville Public Schools and Camelot Education. Camelot offers an alternative setting for students facing behavioral, emotional or academic challenges.

The district has high school sending/receiving relationships with Commercial Township, Lawrence Township and Maurice River Township. Students from Woodbine had attended the district's high school programs until a July 2013 ruling by the New Jersey Department of Transportation under which Woodbine students would start attending Middle Township High School as of September 2014, while Woodbine students who had already started attendance in Millville would be allowed to graduate.

As part of a project $137 million project begun in 2019 and funded by the New Jersey Schools Development Authority, Millville Senior High School has undergone a project that will add 82,000 square feet (7,600 m^{2}) of space, which will allow all high school students to attend high school in a single building; when complete, the phased high school expansion project will add 230,000 square feet (21,000 m^{2}) of new space at the high school, as well as extensive renovations to existing facilities in the building. Starting in the 1960s, grades 9–10 have been served in Memorial High School and grades 9–12 at Millville Senior High School.

Facing a deficit of $3 million for the 2017–2018 school year, the district closed R.D. Wood Elementary School in order to generate $1.8 million in savings.

Students are also eligible to attend Cumberland County Technical Education Center in Millville, serving students from the entire county in its full-time technical training programs, which are offered without charge to students who are county residents.

St. Mary Magdalen School was a Catholic school serving children in grades K–8 operating under the auspices of the Roman Catholic Diocese of Camden. The school opened in 1882 with an enrollment of 45 students. Former Camden Bishop Joseph Galante announced in January 2012 that the school would close in June due to poor finances resulting from a declining student body. Bishop Schad School in Vineland and St. Mary Regional School in East Vineland are nearby. Additionally As of 2020 Bishop McHugh Regional School in Dennis Township in Cape May County accepts students from Millville.

Sacred Heart High School was in nearby Vineland until its 2013 closure. St. Joseph High School in Hammonton was the closest Catholic high school. However that school closed in 2020.

=== College ===
Rowan College of South Jersey Cumberland Campus (former Cumberland County College) is partially in the Millville city limits with the other portion in Vineland.

=== Library ===
Millville Public Library is the city's public library.

== Transportation ==
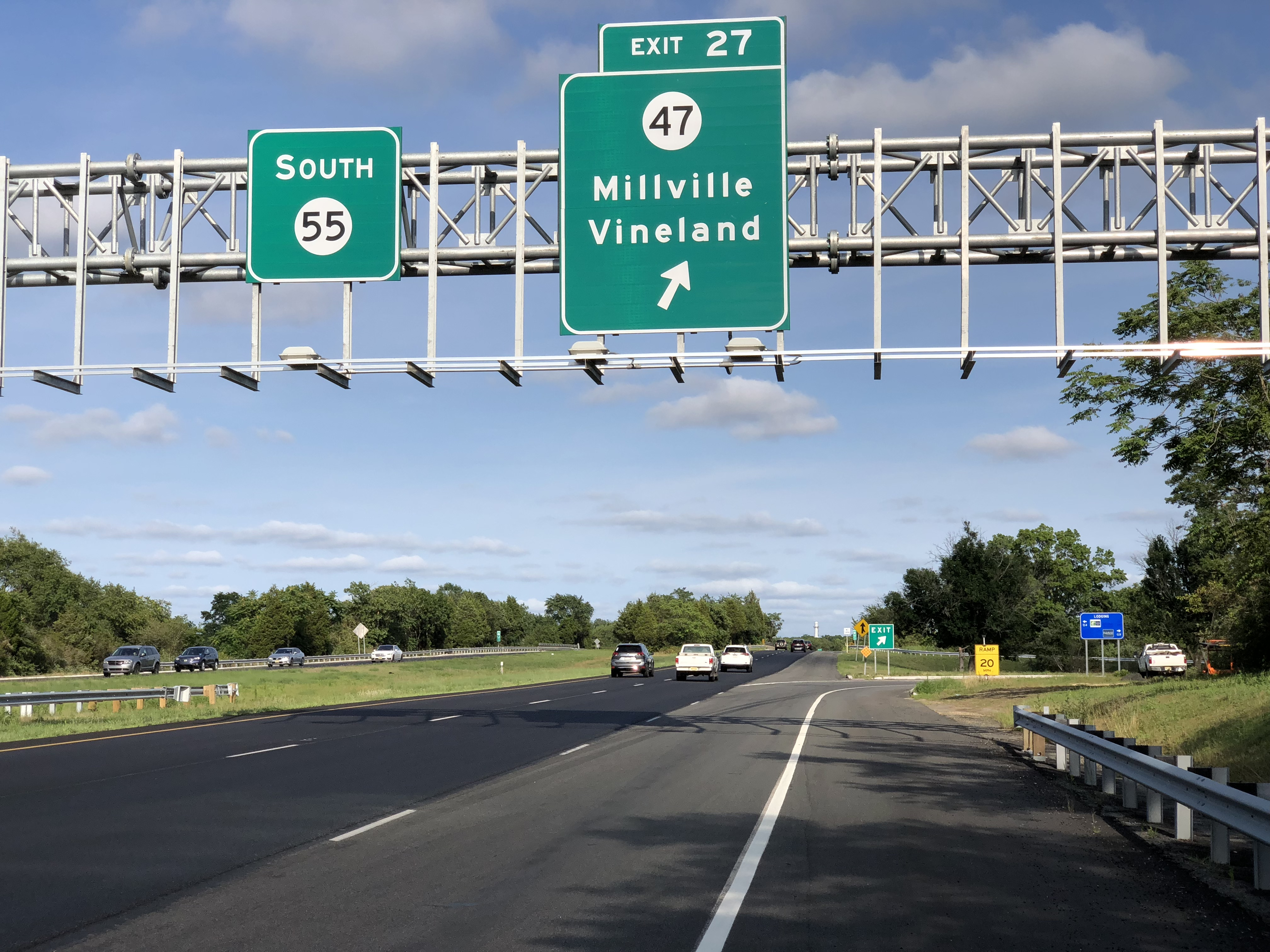
Route 55 southbound in Millville

The city had a total of 172.73 miles (277.98 km) of roadways, of which 107.90 miles (173.65 km) were maintained by the municipality, 42.39 miles (68.22 km) by Cumberland County and 22.44 miles (36.11 km) by the New Jersey Department of Transportation.

Major roads that pass through the city include Route 47, Route 49 and Route 55.

=== Public transportation ===
Millville Municipal Airport, operated by the Delaware River and Bay Authority, serves general aviation.

NJ Transit has several bus routes that service the Millville region. Service includes the 313 route from Cape May to Philadelphia, the 408 route between Milville and Philadelphia and the 553 route from Upper Deerfield Township to Atlantic City.

== Attractions ==
- New Jersey Motorsports Park
- Southwind Vineyard & Winery
- Laurel Lake Community Center, Beaches and Piersites
- Wheaton Arts and Cultural Center
- Glasstown Brewing Company

== Parks and recreation ==
The Cumberland Cape Atlantic YMCA is in nearby Vineland. The corporate name was changed from Vineland YMCA as the board of directors decided to expand the organization's service area to Atlantic County and Cape May County.

There was a previous YMCA campus in Millville which stopped operations in August 1990. In late 1997 Millville Housing Authority purchased the campus. An apartment complex was installed in the former administration building and gymnasium, while a new building was constructed on the site of the former racquetball courts. Millville Housing Authority occupied the second floor; the first floor became a new exercise center. The first floor of the new building and a pre-existing basement is used by the Holly City Development Corp. Family Center (HCDC), which leases from the housing authority and opened the center on January 2, 2001.

== Notable people ==
Notable past and present residents of Millville include:

- LeQuint Allen (born 2004), running back for the Syracuse Orange
- A. R. Ammons (1926–2001), author and poet, winner of the National Book Award
- George K. Brandriff (1890–1936), painter
- Lotzeir Brooks (class of 2025), American football wide receiver for the Alabama Crimson Tide
- Fred Pierce Corson (1896−1985), Bishop of The Methodist Church
- Grace Mary Flickinger (1935–2024), biology professor and faculty athletics representative at Xavier University of Louisiana, 1968–2016
- Merritt Gant (born 1971), guitarist for metal band Overkill
- Stephen O. Garrison (1853–1900), Methodist minister and scholar who founded The Training School in Vineland, New Jersey
- L. Fred Gieg (1890–1977), football and basketball player and coach
- Leon Henderson (1895–1986), administrator of the Office of Price Administration from 1941 to 1942
- Dwayne Hendricks (born 1986), professional football player who briefly played for the New York Giants
- James R. Hurley (born 1932), politician
- Buddy Kennedy (born 1998), Major League Baseball player
- R. Bruce Land (born 1950), politician and former corrections officer who has represented the 1st Legislative District in the New Jersey General Assembly since 2016
- William A. McKeighan (1842–1895), Nebraska Populist politician
- Walter Mulford (1877–1955), forester and professor, regarded as the first state forester in the United States
- Chase Petty (born c. 2002–2003), Minor League Baseball player drafted 26th overall by the Minnesota Twins in the 2021 MLB draft
- Steve Romanik (1924–2009), played collegiate football for the Villanova Wildcats, and played quarterback in the NFL from 1950 to 1954 for the Chicago Bears and Chicago Cardinals
- Edward H. Salmon (born 1942), politician who served as mayor of Millville and represented the 1st Legislative District in the New Jersey General Assembly from 1988 to 1991
- Hannah Whitall Smith (1832–1911), lay speaker and author in the Holiness movement in the United States and the Higher Life movement in the United Kingdom of Great Britain and Ireland
- Logan Pearsall Smith (1865–1946), essayist and critic
- Edward C. Stokes (1860–1942), Governor of New Jersey 1905–1908
- Barry H. Streeter (born c. 1949), former college football coach
- Mike Trout (born 1991), Major League Baseball player for Los Angeles Angels, nicknamed "The Millville Meteor"
- Daniel D.W. (born 1979, née Daniel D. Warwick), author of "Hive Propolis" and an award-winning VFX designer, independent film maker and screenplay writer
- Anne Waldman (born 1945), poet
- Frank H. Wheaton Sr. (1881–1983), known as the "dean of American Glassware" during his tenure as Wheaton Industries president
