= The Probationer's Catechism =

1883 publication

- Author: S. Olin Garrison
- Language: English (with translations into other languages)
- Genre: Catechism
- Published: 1883
- Publisher: Phillips & Hunt
- Publication place: United States
- Pages: 80 pages (Hardcover)

The Probationer's Catechism, also called The Probationer's Handbook, is a catechism authored by Methodist divine S. Olin Garrison for probationary members of the Methodist Episcopal Church seeking full membership. First published in 1883, it has been the most used probationer's manual in the history of Methodism in the 19th and 20th centuries. It was widely used in the thirty years since it was first printed, with over a half-million sold. Several editions of The Probationer's Handbook have been released, including those of "1885, 1887, 1896, 1904, and 1909." The period of probationary membership in Methodist connexions normatively lasts six months. As such, the text provides a "topic and resources for each of the six months for the prescribed probationary period."

The Probationer's Catechism teaches Methodist history, doctrine and polity; it includes the Articles of Religion, General Rules, as well as holiness standards on "amusements, dress marriage, temperance, and tobacco". The Baptismal Covenant, Apostles' Creed, General Confession, Ten Commandments, as well as the rite for baptism, the rite for the reception of probationary members, and the rite for receiving probationers as full members are contained in The Probationer's Catechism, along with a prayer of consecration. The book includes lectures that would be important to Methodist probationers, such as "Duty of Church Membership" by Bostwick Hawley.
