= The Pennington School =

Prep school in Pennington, New Jersey, US

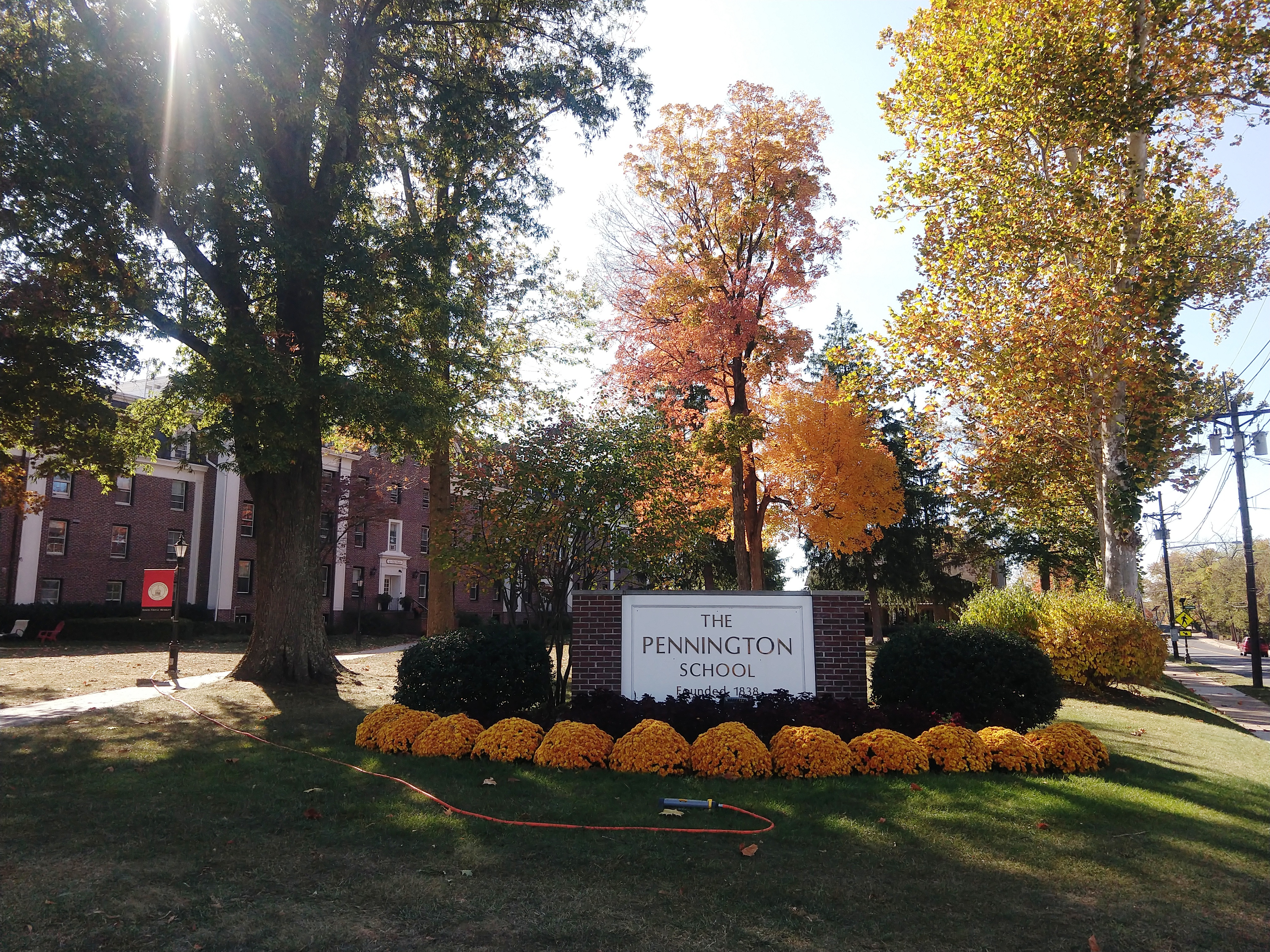
- Front of Old Main Hall and school sign along Delaware Avenue

Location
- 112 West Delaware Avenue; Pennington, Mercer County, New Jersey 08534; 40°19′43.02″N 74°47′39.75″W

Information
- Type: Independent boarding and day school
- Motto: Honor. Virtue. Humility.
- Established: 1838; 188 years ago
- NCES School ID: 00869182
- Head of school: William S. Hawkey
- Faculty: 92 FTEs
- Grades: 6–12
- Enrollment: 537 (as of 2023–24)
- Student to teacher ratio: 5.8:1
- Campus: 55 acres (220,000 m^{2})
- Colors: Red and Black
- Team name: Red Hawks
- Tuition: $48,600 (Upper School, Day for 2023–24)
- Affiliation: United Methodist Church
- Website: www.pennington.org

The Pennington School is an independent, coeducational college preparatory school for day and boarding students located in Pennington, Mercer County, New Jersey. The school operates for students in sixth through twelfth grades. The Head of School is William S. Hawkey, who assumed the position in July 2014.

As of the 2023–24 school year, the school had an enrollment of 537 students and 92 classroom teachers (on an FTE basis), for a student–teacher ratio of 5.8:1. The school's student body was 54.4% (292) White, 19.9% (107) Asian, 10.1% (54) Black, 9.5% (51) two or more races, 6% (32) Hispanic and 0.2% (1) American Indian / Alaska Native.

Pennington is a member of the National Association of Independent Schools, the New Jersey Association of Independent Schools, the Association of Delaware Valley Independent Schools, and the General Board of Higher Education and Ministry of the United Methodist Church. The school has been accredited by the Middle States Association of Colleges and Schools Commission on Elementary and Secondary Schools since 1930; the accreditation expires in May 2025.

== History ==
The Pennington School was founded in 1838 during the Second Great Awakening as the Methodist Episcopal Male Seminary, a college preparatory school for boys, in order to secure "the education of the physical, the training of the mental, and the grounding of the soul in character." Pennington officially became a coeducational institution, The Pennington Seminary and Female Collegiate Institute, in the fall of 1854. In March 1910, Pennington would again become a school for boys, reverting to the name Pennington Seminary. Shortly afterward, the school's name evolved to its present form, sometimes with the addition of "for Boys." It was not until 1972 that Pennington once again became a coeducational institution. In 1975, the Center for Learning, one of the nation's secondary school programs for bright children with learning disabilities, was created within the school to serve a small number of college-preparatory students.

== Academics ==
Middle school students have their own faculty teaching children of this age (sixth through eighth grade). Middle school courses include: Algebra, American History and Government Applications, Art-o-Rama, Computer Skills, Earth Science, English, French, Geometry, German, Global Perspectives, Health, Humanities, Latin, Life Science, Math, Music, Physical Science, Spanish, Technology, Writer's Studio, and many elective offerings. Upper School students are offered a full range of both Honors and Advanced Placement courses.

== Visual and performing arts ==
The Arts Department offers courses and activities in drama, music, and the visual arts for both Middle School and Upper School students.

=== Music ===
Music courses include: Chorus, Composition, Handbell Ensemble, Instrumental Ensemble, Instrumental Lab, Jazz Band, Keyboard, Music History, Music Technology, Music Theory, Orchestra, Pennington Singers, Pit Band, and Vocal Ensemble.

=== Drama ===
Drama courses include: Acting Shakespeare, Advanced Drama, Foundations in Drama, Public Speaking, Puppetry & Performance, Respect for Acting, Small Group Dynamics, and Stagecrafts.

=== Visual art ===
Visual Art courses include: Adobe Photoshop, Advanced Black & White Darkroom Skills, Alternative Processes, Ceramics, Digital Photography, Drawing, Painting, Sculpture, and Video Production.

== Athletics ==
The Pennington School Red Hawks compete in the Patriot Conference, which includes the Gill St. Bernard's School, the Ranney School, the Purnell School, Stuart Country Day School, Wardlaw-Hartridge School, Timothy Christian School, Princeton Day School, and Saddle River Day School. In addition. Pennington competes regularly against The Peddie School, the Hun School of Princeton, and Lawrenceville School.

The Pennington School has 44 athletic teams on its campus. The Upper School sports include: boys varsity, JV, and Thirds soccer, girls varsity and JV soccer, varsity and JV field hockey, varsity and JV water polo, boys and girls cross country, girls varsity and JV tennis, cheerleading, girls varsity and JV basketball, boys varsity, JV, and Thirds basketball, winter track, varsity and JV ice hockey, varsity and JV boys and girls swimming, varsity and JV baseball, varsity softball, golf, boys varsity and JV tennis, boys varsity, JV, and Thirds lacrosse, girls varsity and JV lacrosse, and boys and girls spring track and field. The middle school also has sports, which includes field hockey, soccer, cross country, boys and girls basketball, swimming, boys lacrosse, and spring track and field.

=== Girls' soccer ===
In 2008 the Pennington girls' soccer team finished the season with an undefeated record of 18–0, and was ranked as the consensus #1 team in the United States according to ESPN RISE and the National Soccer Coaches Association of America. During that season they captured their 6th consecutive NJSIAA Prep A State Title and their 2nd consecutive Mercer County Tournament Championship and won their seventh straight Prep A title in the 2009 season. In 2014, the team won its ninth Mercer County Championship title in a 12-year span.

=== Boys' soccer ===
The team won the 2016 Prep A state tournament, with a 3–1 victory in the finals against a Saint Benedict's Preparatory School team that had been the champion for 27 consecutive years. Pennington again won the Prep A state tournament against Saint Benedict's in 2023, with a score of 4–3.

=== Swimming ===
The boys' team placed won the Prep B state tournament from 2009 to 2012 and again in 2014. The girls' team won 11 consecutive Prep B state title.

=== Boys' basketball ===
The team captured the 2009 and 2010 Mercer County Tournament championship and the 2010, 2013, 2014 and 2015 Prep B state championship.

=== Girls' basketball ===
The team won back-to-back Prep B state championships in 2016 and 2017, beating Newark Academy and Morristown-Beard School, respectively. Also, in 2016 the girls advanced to the semi-final round of the Mercer County Tournament. In 2018, the girls lost to Trenton Catholic Academy by a score of 59–55 in the Mercer County Tournament (MCT), making it the first time Pennington had ever advanced to the finals in this tournament. In 2018, the girls' basketball team switched conferences, and began competing in the New Jersey Prep A state tournament; days after losing the MCT final, the team faced off against Pingry School in the finals of the Prep A tournament and won its third consecutive title with a 62–49 win.

== Cervone Center for Learning ==
The Edmund V. Cervone Center for Learning, founded in 1975 by Edmund Cervone, provides a program of academic support for bright students with learning differences.

== Notable alumni ==
- Carmen J. Armenti (1929–2001), restaurateur and politician who served as the mayor of Trenton, New Jersey from 1966 to 1970 and again from 1989 to 1990
- Esther E. Baldwin (1840–1910, class of 1859), missionary, teacher, translator, writer, editor
- Nicole Baxter (born 1994), professional soccer player who played as a midfielder for the National Women's Soccer League club Gotham FC
- Benjamin T. Biggs (1821–1893), member of the U.S. House of Representatives from 1869 to 1873, 38th governor of Delaware
- Grant Billmeier (born 1984), basketball player who played professionally for teams in Germany and Portugal
- Jake Bongiovi (born 2002, class of 2020), actor
- Rudy Boschwitz (born 1930, class of 1947), United States Senator, former chairman National Republican Senatorial Committee
- Borden Parker Bowne (1847–1910, class of 1866), Christian philosopher, clergyman, and theologian in the Methodist tradition. Nominated for the Nobel Prize in Literature nine times
- Amber Brooks (born 1991, class of 2009): professional soccer player for the Dallas Trinity of the USL Super League who played with FC Bayern Munich and the United States Women's National Soccer Team
- Philip L. Cannon (1850–1929), first Lieutenant Governor of Delaware (1901–1905) and son of Governor William Cannon
- Lucilla Green Cheney (1853–1878), physician and medical missionary
- Alana Cook (born 1997), Professional soccer center back for the Kansas City Current
- Alex Cooper (born 1994), podcaster and host of podcast "Call Her Daddy"
- Stephen Crane (1871–1900, class of 1887; never graduated), author of The Red Badge of Courage and Maggie: A Girl of the Streets.
- David Curtiss (born 2002), competitive swimmer who set the national high school record in the 50-yard freestyle
- Sarah Jane Corson Downs (1822–1891), president, New Jersey Woman's Christian Temperance Union
- John Franklin Fort (1852–1920), 33rd Governor of New Jersey, who served from 1908 to 1911
- Dan Frankel (born 1956, class of 1974), politician who has been a member of the Pennsylvania House of Representatives for the 23rd District
- Walter French (1899–1984), outfielder who played in the Major Leagues for the Philadelphia Athletics, from 1923 to 1929
- Stephen O. Garrison (1853–1900, class of 1872), Methodist minister and scholar who founded The Training School in Vineland, New Jersey
- L. Fred Gieg (1890–1977), football and basketball player and coach
- Benjamin Golub (class of 2003), professor of economics and computer science who has taught at Harvard and Northwestern
- Frankie Hayes (1914–1955), catcher, primarily with the Philadelphia Athletics during his 14-year MLB career, who went directly from Pennington to the Major Leagues
- Louise Manning Hodgkins (1846–1935), 19th-century educator, author and missionary newspaper editor
- George Howell (1859–1913), member of the U.S. House of Representatives from Pennsylvania
- Dontae Johnson (born 1991, class of 2010), cornerback played in the NFL from 2014 to 2022 (105 games), mostly for the San Francisco 49ers
- Robyn Jones (born 1985), professional soccer goalkeeper who played two years for the Philadelphia Independence of Women's Professional Soccer
- William Mastrosimone (born 1947, class of 1966), playwright
- Eddie Picken (1907–1994, class of 1927), early professional basketball player
- Loula Roberts Platt (1863–1934), suffragist
- Ralph Lane Polk (1849–1923), founder, publisher and president of R.L. Polk & Company
- Andrew Ridings (born December 16, 1984), actor appearing in over 40 television and film roles in shows such as Scrubs, Unbreakable Kimmy Schmidt, and All My Children.
- James Fowler Rusling (valedictorian, Class of 1852), brigadier general in the American Civil War, author of "Men and Things I Saw in the Civil War Days", "Across America", and "European Days and Ways"
- Casey Ramirez (born 1989), soccer defender who played for the Portland Thorns FC of the National Women's Soccer League
- Myles Stephens (born 1997), basketball player who played professionally for teams in Germany, Finland, Belgium, and Italy
- Stephen Tan (born 1961), executive director of Asia Financial Group and chairman of Bangkok Mercantile (Hong Kong) Company Ltd
- Robert Love Taylor (1850–1912), represented Tennessee's 1st district in the United States House of Representatives from 1879 to 1881, Governor of Tennessee from 1887 to 1891, and again from 1897 to 1899, and subsequently served as a United States Senator from 1907 until his death
- Ethan Vanacore-Decker (born 1994), played professional soccer, appearing in over 125 games, for such teams as the Swope Park Rangers, Union Omaha, and the Richmond Kickers.
- Kenneth Yen (1965–2018), Taiwanese businessman who was chairman of Yulon
