= L. Fred Gieg =

American athlete and coach (1890–1966)

Biographical details
- Born: February 7, 1890; Millville, New Jersey, U.S.
- Died: April 29, 1966 (aged 76); Bryn Mawr, Pennsylvania, U.S.

Playing career

Football
- 1909–1912: Swarthmore

Basketball
- 1909–1913: Swarthmore
- 1913–1917: Trenton Royal Bengals
- Position: Tackle (football)

Coaching career (HC unless noted)

Football
- 1913–1914: Swarthmore

Head coaching record
- Overall: 4–9–2

Louis Frederick Gieg (February 7, 1890 – April 29, 1966) was an American football and basketball player and coach. He served as the head football coach at Swarthmore College from 1913 to 1914, compiling a record of 4–9–2.

Raised in Millville, New Jersey, Geig attended the Pennington Seminary (now The Pennington School), dropping out in order to play basketball professionally.

== Head coaching record ==
Year	Team	Overall	Conference	Standing	Bowl/playoffs
Swarthmore Quakers (Independent) (1913–1914)
1913	Swarthmore	2–4–1			
1914	Swarthmore	2–5–1			
Swarthmore:		4–9–2			
Total:		4–9–2			
