= George K. Brandriff =

American painter (1890-1936)

George Kennedy Brandriff
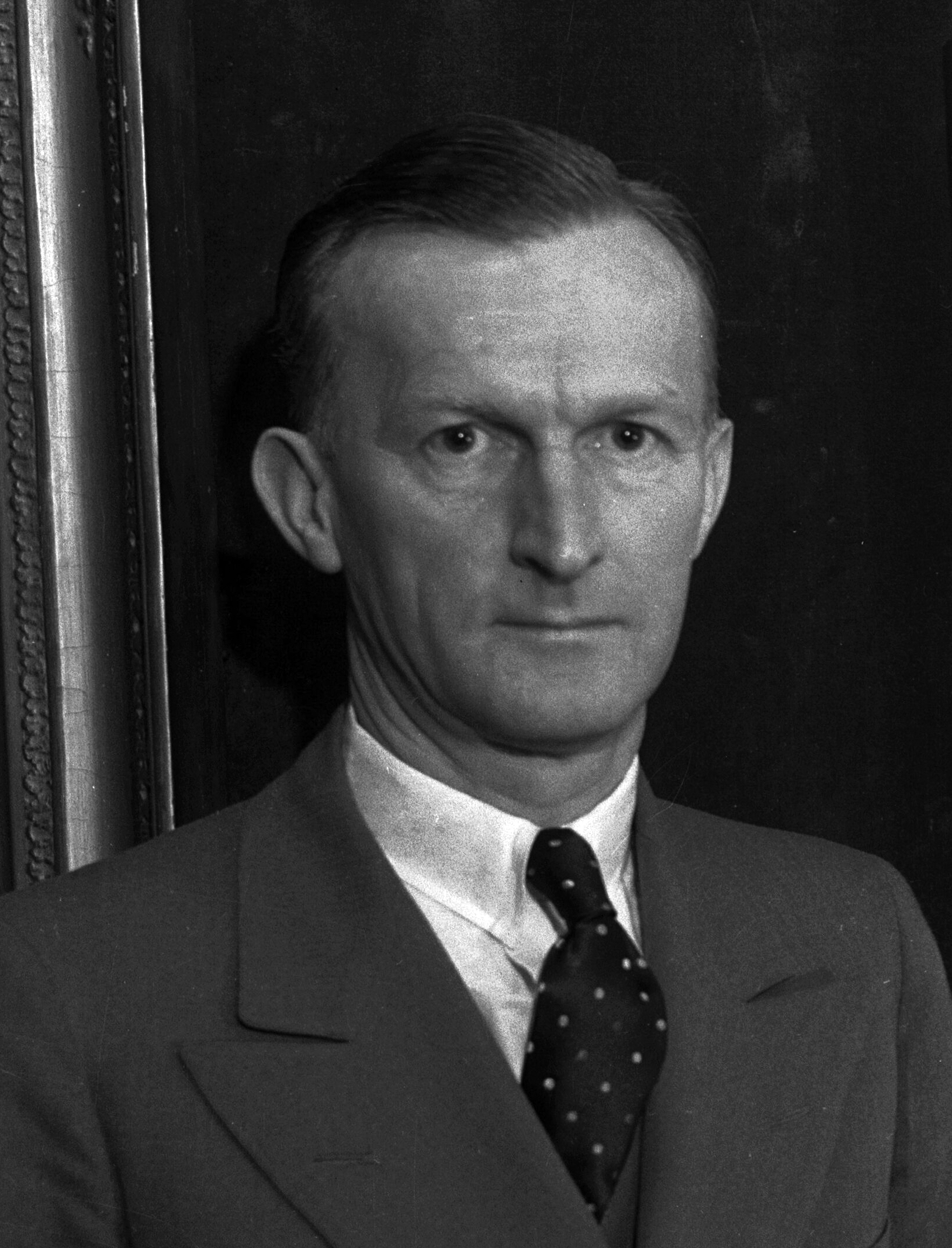
- Brandriff in 1933
- Born: 1890; Millville, New Jersey, U.S.
- Died: August 15, 1936 (aged 45–46); Laguna Beach, California, U.S.
- Education: University of Southern California
- Occupation: Painter
- Spouse: Frances Conder

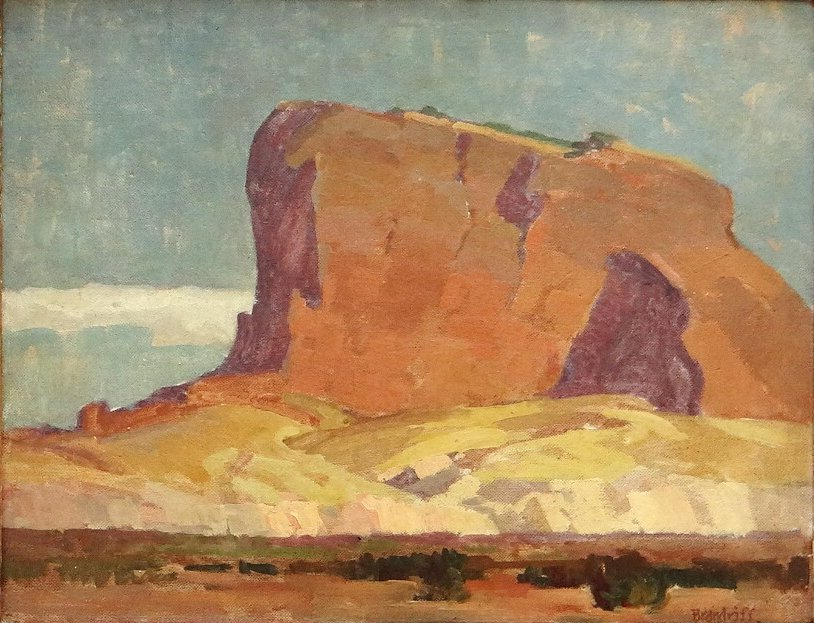
Cly Butte, Monument Valley, Arizona, 1933.

George K. Brandriff (1890 – August 15, 1936) was an American painter, and the president of the Laguna Beach Art Association. He committed suicide at age 46.

== Life ==
Brandriff was born in 1890 in Millville, New Jersey. He grew up in Vineland, New Jersey and moved to California in 1913 to attend the University of Southern California.

Brandriff became a painter in the art colony of Laguna Beach, California, and he served as the president of the Laguna Beach Art Association. He was also a member of the California Art Club. He exhibited his work in many museums, including the Biltmore Salon, the Los Angeles Museum, and the Pennsylvania Academy of Fine Arts.

Brandriff married Frances Conder. He committed suicide by shooting himself on August 15, 1936, in Laguna Beach, at age 46.
