= New Jersey Press Association =

- Abbreviation: NJPA
- Established: February 25, 1857; 169 years ago
- Founded at: Rutgers University
- Type: Professional society
- Tax ID no.: 501(c)(6)
- Purpose: Increase newspaper readership across the state and coordinate for the interests of newspapers in government
- Headquarters: 840 Bear Tavern Road Suite 305
- Location: Ewig, New Jersey, United States
- President: Brett Ainsworth
- First VP Daily: Audrey Harvin
- Second VP Weekly: David Nahan
- GAC Chairman: Richard Vezza
- Subsidiaries: New Jersey Newspaper Network; New Jersey Press Foundation
- Website: www.njpa.org/njpa/

The New Jersey Press Association (NJPA) is a professional society for journalists in New Jersey that also acts as a governing body for New Jersey newspapers offering awards and otherwise governing the profession.

== History ==
The NJPA was established on February 25, 1857 during a meeting between 28 editors of 26 newspapers from across the state, seeking to establish a "brethren of the press of New Jersey" to increase readership across the state and coordinate for the interests of newspapers in government. The NJPA quickly became affiliated to the Rutgers University journalism department, starting with an informal affiliation in 1922, which transformed into the department naming an "executive director" starting in 1935. The group was vital in the passage of the first libel law in New Jersey in 1923, and in 1930 the NJPA drafted a shield law that was eventually adopted nation-wide in 1933.

During World War II the NJPA helped coordinate rationing of paper for the war effort and in 1946 the NJPA severed ties with Rutgers and became an independent organization. In 1978 the NJPA moved their offices off Rutgers campus entirely for a new location in the state capital Trenton before moving again in 1995 to West Trenton. The NJPA has championed itself on reducing the work age, namely for sponsoring legislation in 1982 allowing news carriers to be 11 years old, down from 12. In 1983 the New Jersey Supreme Court ruled in favor of the NJPA, allowing a journalist to be in the observation room during a lethal injection execution.

The paper hosts a yearly competition seeking the best college newspaper in the state, and awarding its staff with a grant, as well as internships at member papers. The newspaper also hosts the "Better Newspaper Contest" which seeks the best newspaper overall in the state, with the winners being granted superlatives and other awards.

In 2012 the NJPA attempted to challenge a New Jersey Supreme Court ruling that journalists are not allowed with 100 ft of a polling station at the United States District Court for the District of New Jersey, but the motion was defeated when judge Joel A. Pisano found against the NJPA, arguing that the provision was implemented due to "A history of voter intimidation and obstruction in New Jersey" and if overturned warned that there would've been a threat of a "disturbed election."

In 2013 Stan Ellis, editor in chief of the Burlington County Times was named the NJPA president, replacing the outgoing Stephen W. Parker from New Jersey Hills Media Group.

In 2017 the NJPA got into a spat with New Jersey Governor Chris Christie over their delay of a study which would've seen how much legal ads cost the New Jersey taxpayer, since newspapers are heavily subsidized in the state. These ads, mostly consisting of court rulings, cost tens of millions of dollars per year, with newspapers like The Star-Ledger earning $16.6 million in ad revenue from the state in 2016.

The NJPA was opposed to a 2025 motion that would've ended the requirement for the state to pay newspapers to publish legal notices, instead supporting an effort to classify online news as newspapers (which they still aren't under NJ law), and instead have a free and easily accessible website host the notices, financed directly by the NJPA. The NJPA also argued that by removing that source of government revenue, via the fees to publish the notices, many smaller independent newspapers would perish, and that the bill would've delivered a "devastating financial blow" to newspapers in the state. An NJPA compiled and financed notice database is now part of the New Jersey State Library archives.

== Member papers ==
- Asbury Park Press
- Burlington County Times
- Courier News
- Courier‑Post
- Daily Record
- Herald News
- Home News Tribune
- New Jersey Herald
- South Jersey Times
- The Daily Journal
- The Jersey Journal
- The Press of Atlantic City
- The Record
- The Star‑Ledger
- The Times
- The Philadelphia Inquirer
- The Express‑Times
