= Hive Propolis =

2015 novel by Daniel D.W.

hive Propolis
- Cover to the first printing
- Author: Daniel D.W.
- Language: English
- Genre: Science fiction and dystopian
- Publisher: Mythos Media and HiveTech Media
- Publication date: May 10, 2015
- Media type: Print (paperback)
- Pages: 178
- ISBN: 978-1507569078
- Followed by: hive Camellia

hive | Propolis is a science fiction and dystopian novel by Daniel D.W. and the first volume of The Hive Transmedia Project. The book was published by Mythos Media and HiveTech Media on May 10, 2015. The book contains decipherable easter eggs as well as scannable QR codes for music, animation, videos and a transmedia storyline.

== Plot summary ==
In the year 2023, Millions connect to Hive (human interface for virtual evolution), an augmented-reality technology that consolidates an individual's devices and technology into a holographic visual display that is projected from their mind. The system creates a collective consciousness with its users and their communication is transferred through a virtual telepathy. Meanwhile, The Disconnected are left in its wake; forced to adapt to a primitive lifestyle in the outskirts of Hive cities.

Propolis follows nine-year-old Samantha Plessis, as she witnesses her family opt into beta testing this new product to receive health insurance benefits to treat her immune disorder. Since her disease prevents her from connecting to Hive, she becomes gradually alienated by her family, whose method of communication is now changing. Her mother, father and sister attitudes and moods change from her perspective; becoming less patient with her, and doing things out of the ordinary. Their consequential negligence and alienation lead to choices that threaten her safety, and for two years she compares her family to empty cicada chassis'. During an update for the beta-testers to the full version on Hive Day in 2025, Samantha watches her family and a number of people in her town collapse at once to their death. She then is adopted by her grandfather and moves to his farm, where he informs her of his predictions of an upcoming war.

Meanwhile, HiveTech CEO Miles Parker, struggles for control of his company with his father, Dr. Lewis Dean Parker. Dr. Parker lives omnipresently on the Hive servers, as a digital copy of his human consciousness after he was cryogenically frozen pre-mortem in 2015. After Miles becomes distraught over the millions dying from the update, Dr. Parker uploads a sedative called "propolis".

== Main characters ==
- Samantha/Camellia Plessis is a nine-year-old girl from southern New Jersey. Samantha suffers from Bruton's disease which prevents her from connecting to Hive. She has a fondness for nature and discovery, and portrays a budding intelligence greater than most people her age. But, her mood becomes darker and depressed as her family's method of communication becomes more thought-based through Hive. She has a growing distrust of Jared Plessis after finding out that he is an adoptive father, and watching him become more callous after connecting to Hive.
- Jared Plessis is the husband of Joan and father to Samantha and Melody. He reacts quickly based on his emotion and inferiority complex which manifests as hidden jealousy and pride, while having a deep need to be seen as a strong role model and head of his family. While using Hive, he becomes obsessed. He feels that it is sucking in his conscious into another world - and desires it to do so - because of his resentment toward his dull life.
- Joan Plessis is a caring mother, which she feels extends to her husband, who strikes her as an overgrown child. While she uses Hive along with Melody and Jared, she begins to neglect a normal amount of verbal and physical communication with Samantha. She over uses her beta-version of Hive and her allotted data transfer runs out, making her catatonic. Jared turns her Hive connection off temporarily and she suffers from intense withdrawal.
- Miles Parker is the CEO and spokesperson for HiveTech, the company that created the Hive product. He is motivated to carry on his late father's work.
- Dr. Lewis Dean Parker is Miles' father and inventor. He exists only as a digital copy of his human consciousness on the HiveTech servers, but in fact still controls most of the development of the product.
- Melody Plessis is Samantha's sister who struggles with acceptance with her peers.
- Alexa Thierry is Joan's best friend and Samantha's pediatrician.
- Lucien Thierry is Alexa's husband, who is a painter and philosopher. His paintings give inspiration and perspective to Samantha.
- Emerson Thierry is the nine-year-old son to Alexa and Lucien. Emerson is an active kid who is confrontational. He is connected to the full-version of Hive because his older brother, Michael, is an application developer at HiveTech.

== Reception ==
Geekadelphia said, "If you're looking for 21st century science fiction that escapes the page itself, this is it. Be excited." and "(Do you) feel like print science fiction could use a kick in the pants to propel it into modernity? Local author Daniel Dw may have just published the novel you're looking for." "Rep Radio" called Propolis, "Beautifully written and incredibly unique with its incorporation of multi-media. A game-changer for all future literature."

== In-book QR Codes ==
"hive | Propolis," includes dynamic scannable QR codes embedded within the book itself. This provides soundtracks, video and animation, and interactive story clues. This includes clues to real-world places and events announced through social media accounts that the reader must discover from the story itself.

== Cyphers and Easter Eggs ==
Using the book, a reader can decipher clues to the transmedia timelines and external sources for a simulated reality story.

== See also ==
- Transmedia
- Simulated reality
