= 1988 United States House of Representatives elections in New Jersey =

- November 8, 1988

All 14 New Jersey seats to the United States House of Representatives
- Turnout: 77% (▲34pp)
	Majority party	Minority party
Party	Democratic	Republican
Last election	8	6
Seats won	8	6
Seat change	Steady	Steady
Popular vote	1,336,324	1,411,850
Percentage	48.1%	50.9%
Swing	▼4.1	▲3.9

Democratic
50–60%
60–70%
70–80%
90–100%
Republican
50–60%
60–70%
70–80%
80–90%

The 1988 United States House of Representatives elections in New Jersey were held on November 8, 1988, to determine who would represent the people of New Jersey in the United States House of Representatives. This election coincided with national elections for President of the United States, U.S. House and U.S. Senate. New Jersey had fourteen seats in the House, apportioned according to the 1980 United States census. Representatives are elected for two-year terms.

Despite George H.W. Bush's landslide victory in the state's concurrent presidential election, in which he carried all but two congressional districts, the Republican Party made no gains in the House.

== Overview ==
1988 United States House of Representatives elections in New Jersey
Party	Votes	Percentage	Candidates	Seats	+/–
Democratic	1,336,325	48.14%	14	8	Steady
Republican	1,411,840	50.86%	13	6	Steady
Libertarian	9,215	0.33%	7	0	Steady
Socialist Workers	5,573	0.20%	2	0	Steady
Communist	442	0.02%	1	0	Steady
Independents	12,709	0.46%	8	0	Steady
Totals	2,776,104	100.00%	44	14	Steady

== District 1 ==
1988 New Jersey's 1st congressional district election
- November 8, 1988
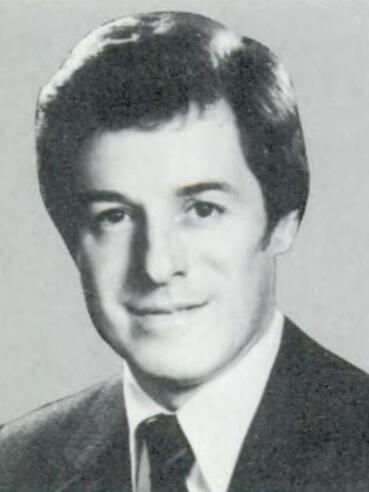

Nominee	James Florio	Frank Cristaudo
Party	Democratic	Republican
Popular vote	141,988	60,037
Percentage	69.9%	29.5%
U.S. Representative before election
James Florio
Democratic
Elected U.S. Representative
James Florio
Democratic

Incumbent Democrat James Florio won. The district included parts of Burlington, Camden, and Gloucester counties.

=== Democratic primary ===
==== Candidates ====
- James Florio, incumbent Representative since 1975

==== Results ====
1988 Democratic primary
Party	Candidate	Votes	%
Democratic	James Florio (incumbent)	41,745	100.00%
Total votes		41,745	100.00%

=== Republican primary ===
==== Candidates ====
- Frank A. Cristaudo, East Greenwich lawyer and former Gloucester County judge

==== Results ====
1988 Republican primary
Party	Candidate	Votes	%
Republican	Frank A. Cristaudo	10,403	100.00%
Total votes		10,403	100.00%

=== General election ===
==== Candidates ====
- Richard Bartucci (Libertarian)
- Frank A. Cristaudo, East Greenwich lawyer and former Gloucester County judge (Republican)
- James Florio, incumbent Representative since 1975 (Republican)

==== Campaign ====
Florio, who had run for governor in 1977 and 1981, was widely considered the leading Democratic contender for 1989. Accordingly, the campaign became a referendum on his potential 1989 candidacy. Cristaudo pointed to Florio's poor congressional attendance during his 1981 campaign and arguing, "The people of this district will be without a Congressman for almost a year in 1989 if they re-elect Mr. Florio, and if he wins the race for governor, they'll have to go through the expense of a special election to pick another Congressman." Cristaudo also criticized Florio for failing to deliver on a promised veterans hospital, which was built in Ocean County instead.

Richard Bartucci, the Libertarian candidate, criticized obstacles to free trade, arguing, "If we don't have free trade that allows goods to cross borders, then armies will cross them."

==== Results ====
1988 U.S. House election
Party	Candidate	Votes	%	±%
Democratic	James Florio (incumbent)	141,988	69.89%	▼5.75
Republican	Frank A. Cristaudo	60,037	29.55%	▲5.95
Libertarian	Richard A. Bartucci	1,125	0.55%	▼0.20
Total votes		203,153	100.00%	
Democratic hold		Swing	{{{swing}}}	

== District 2 ==
1988 New Jersey's 2nd congressional district election
- November 8, 1988
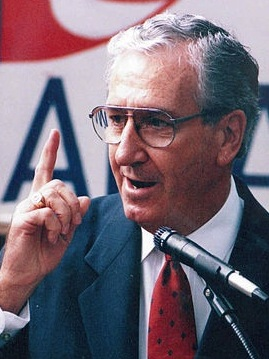

Nominee	William J. Hughes	Kirk W. Conover
Party	Democratic	Republican
Popular vote	134,505	67,769
Percentage	65.7%	33.1%
U.S. Representative before election
William J. Hughes
Democratic
Elected U.S. Representative
William J. Hughes
Democratic

Incumbent William J. Hughes won. This district, the largest in South Jersey, included all of Atlantic, Cape May, Cumberland, and Salem counties and parts of Gloucester County.

=== Democratic primary ===
==== Candidates ====
- William J. Hughes, incumbent Representative since 1975

==== Results ====
1988 Democratic primary
Party	Candidate	Votes	%
Democratic	William J. Hughes (incumbent)	22,411	100.00%
Total votes		22,411	100.00%

=== Republican primary ===
==== Candidates ====
- Kirk W. Conover, Atlantic County freeholder
- Thomas M. Warner

==== Results ====
1988 Republican primary
Party	Candidate	Votes	%
Republican	Kirk W. Conover	16,157	84.04%
Republican	Thomas M. Warner	3,069	15.96%
Total votes		19,226	100.00%

=== General election ===
==== Candidates ====
- Kirk W. Conover, Atlantic County freeholder (Republican)
- William J. Hughes, incumbent Representative since 1975 (Democratic)
- Richard A. Schindenwolf Jr. (Pro-Life Conservative)

==== Campaign ====
Hughes said that the overriding issue in the campaign should be his record, "whether I have been a good Congressman, have exhibited honesty and integrity, and have been accessible and accountable and whether there is any reason to make a change."

Conover ran on his support of a balanced budget amendment and line-item veto, as well as his support for the Gramm–Rudman–Hollings Balanced Budget Act, which Hughes opposed as a "fiscal straightjacket" which he argued underfunded the United States Coast Guard and other vital services.

Richard Schindenwolf called for abortion to be outlawed and more United States opposition to communism, including the overthrow of Daniel Ortega in Nicaragua. He said that the failed Bay of Pigs invasion had "enabled communism to get a toehold in Cuba and paved the way for exportation of communism to other parts of the Caribbean."

==== Results ====
1988 U.S. House election
Party	Candidate	Votes	%	±%
Democratic	William J. Hughes (incumbent)	134,505	65.73%	▼1.53
Republican	Kirk W. Conover	67,769	33.12%	▲4.48
Independent	Richard A. Schindenwolf Jr.	2,372	1.16%	N/A
Total votes		204,646	100.00%	
Democratic hold		Swing	{{{swing}}}	

== District 3 ==
1988 New Jersey's 3rd congressional district election
- November 8, 1988
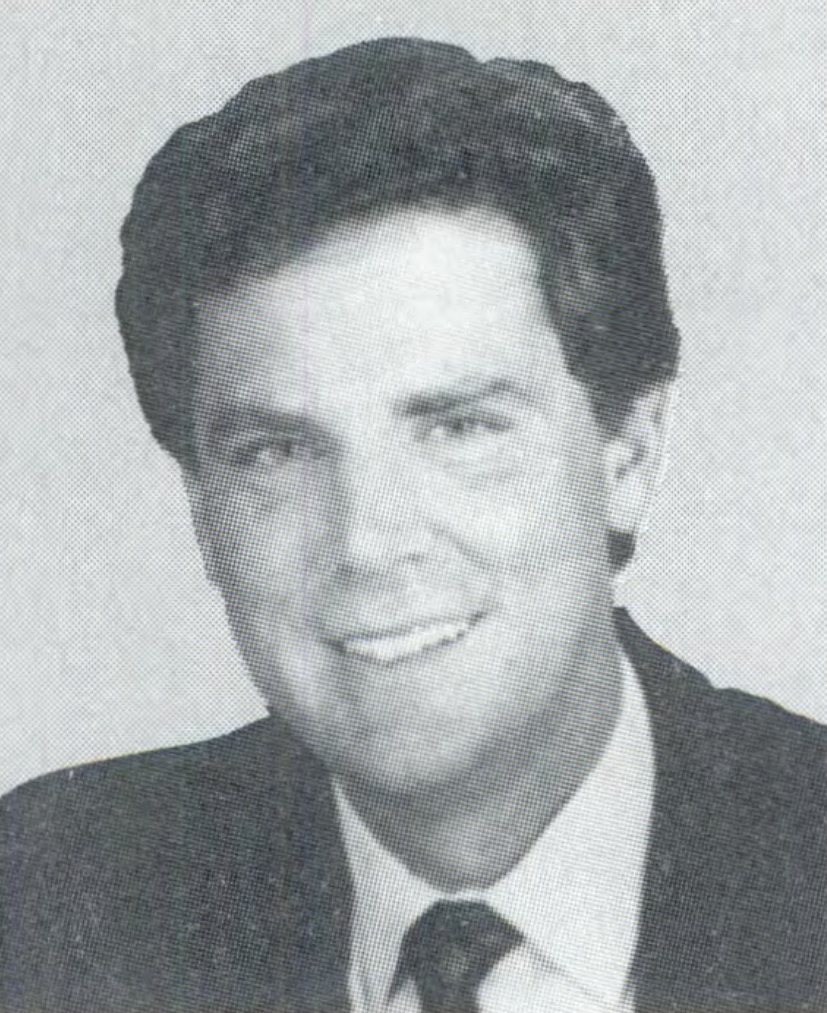

Nominee	Frank Pallone	Joseph Azzolina
Party	Democratic	Republican
Popular vote	117,024	107,479
Percentage	51.6%	47.4%
U.S. Representative before election
Vacant
Elected U.S. Representative
Frank Pallone
Democratic

This seat was vacant following the death of incumbent James J. Howard on March 25, 1988. Frank Pallone won the open seat, as well as a special election to complete Howard's unexpired term in office.

This district included parts of Monmouth and Ocean counties.

=== Democratic primary ===
==== Candidates ====
- Frank Pallone, state senator and member of the Long Branch City Council

==== Withdrew ====
- Richard McAleer, car leasing agent and candidate for U.S. Senate in 1982

==== Declined ====
- Joseph Frankel, mayor of Eatontown
- Richard Van Wagner, state senator from Middletown

==== Results ====
1988 Democratic primary
Party	Candidate	Votes	%
Democratic	Frank Pallone	24,105	100.00%
Total votes		24,105	100.00%

==== Special primary results ====
1988 Democratic special primary
Party	Candidate	Votes	%
Democratic	Frank Pallone	22,198	100.00%
Total votes		22,198	100.00%

=== Republican primary ===
==== Candidates ====
- Joseph Azzolina, former assemblyman and state senator from Middletown
- Scott M. Colabella, former aide to Governor Thomas Kean
- Brian T. Kennedy, former state senator from Sea Girt and nominee for this district in 1984 and 1986
- Brian J. Rechten, advertising agent and promoter
- John J. Whalen, retired U.S. Army colonel

==== Withdrew ====
- Anthony M. Villane, assemblyman from Long Branch

==== Results ====
1988 Republican primary
Party	Candidate	Votes	%
Republican	Joseph Azzolina	15,433	66.93%
Republican	Brian T. Kennedy	3,251	14.10%
Republican	Scott M. Colabella	1,789	7.76%
Republican	Brian J. Rechten	1,587	6.88%
Republican	John J. Whalen	1,000	4.34%
Total votes		23,060	100.00%

==== Special primary results ====
1988 Republican special primary
Party	Candidate	Votes	%
Republican	Joseph Azzolina	16,816	84.17%
Republican	Scott M. Colabella	3,163	15.83%
Total votes		19,979	100.00%

=== General election ===
==== Candidates ====
- Joseph Azzolina, former assemblyman and state senator from Middletown (Republican)
- Frank Pallone, state senator and member of the Long Branch City Council (Democratic)
- Laura Stewart (Libertarian)

==== Results ====
1988 U.S. House election
Party	Candidate	Votes	%	±%
Democratic	Frank Pallone	117,024	51.64%	▼7.06
Republican	Joseph Azzolina	107,479	47.43%	▲6.13
Libertarian	Laura Stewart	2,107	0.93%	N/A
Total votes		226,610	100.00%	
Democratic hold		Swing	{{{swing}}}	

==== Special election results ====
1988 U.S. House special election
Party	Candidate	Votes	%	±%
Democratic	Frank Pallone	116,988	51.95%	
Republican	Joseph Azzolina	106,489	47.29%	
Libertarian	Laura Stewart	1,713	0.76%	
Total votes		225,190	100.00%	
Democratic hold		Swing	{{{swing}}}	

== District 4 ==
1988 New Jersey's 4th congressional district election
- November 8, 1988
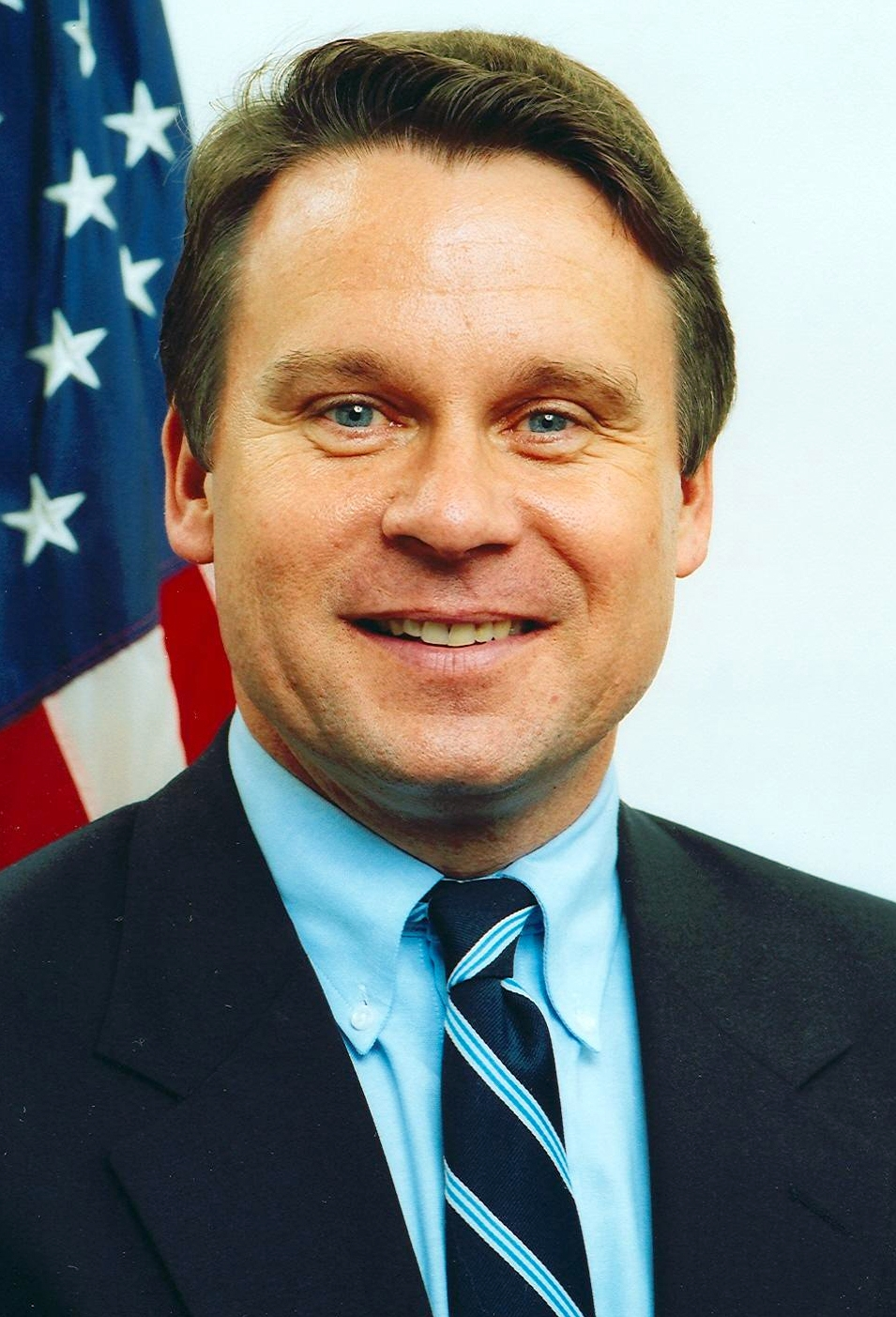

Nominee	Chris Smith	Betty Holland
Party	Republican	Democratic
Popular vote	155,283	79,006
Percentage	65.7%	33.4%
U.S. Representative before election
Chris Smith
Republican
Elected U.S. Representative
Chris Smith
Republican

Incumbent Republican Chris Smith won. This district, in Central Jersey, consisted of parts of Burlington, Mercer, Middlesex, Monmouth and Ocean counties.

=== Republican primary ===
==== Candidates ====
- Chris Smith, incumbent Representative since 1981

==== Results ====
1988 Republican primary
Party	Candidate	Votes	%
Republican	Chris Smith (incumbent)	12,974	100.00%
Total votes		12,974	100.00%

=== Democratic primary ===
==== Candidates ====
- Betty Holland, wife of Trenton mayor Arthur John Holland
- Saul G. Hornik, mayor of Marlboro

==== Results ====
1988 Democratic primary
Party	Candidate	Votes	%
Democratic	Betty Holland	21,169	67.38%
Democratic	Saul G. Hornik	10,247	32.62%
Total votes		31,416	100.00%

=== General election ===
==== Candidates ====
- Judson M. Carter (Independent)
- Betty Holland, wife of Trenton mayor Arthur John Holland (Democratic)
- Daniel A. Maiullo Jr. (Libertarian)
- Chris Smith, incumbent Representative since 1981 (Republican)

==== Results ====
1988 U.S. House election
Party	Candidate	Votes	%	±%
Republican	Chris Smith (incumbent)	155,283	65.74%	▲4.63
Democratic	Betty Holland	79,006	33.45%	▼5.83
Independent	Judson M. Carter	1,114	0.47%	N/A
Libertarian	Daniel A. Maiullo Jr.	791	0.33%	N/A
Total votes		236,194	100.00%	
Republican hold		Swing	{{{swing}}}	

== District 5 ==
1988 New Jersey's 5th congressional district election
- November 8, 1988
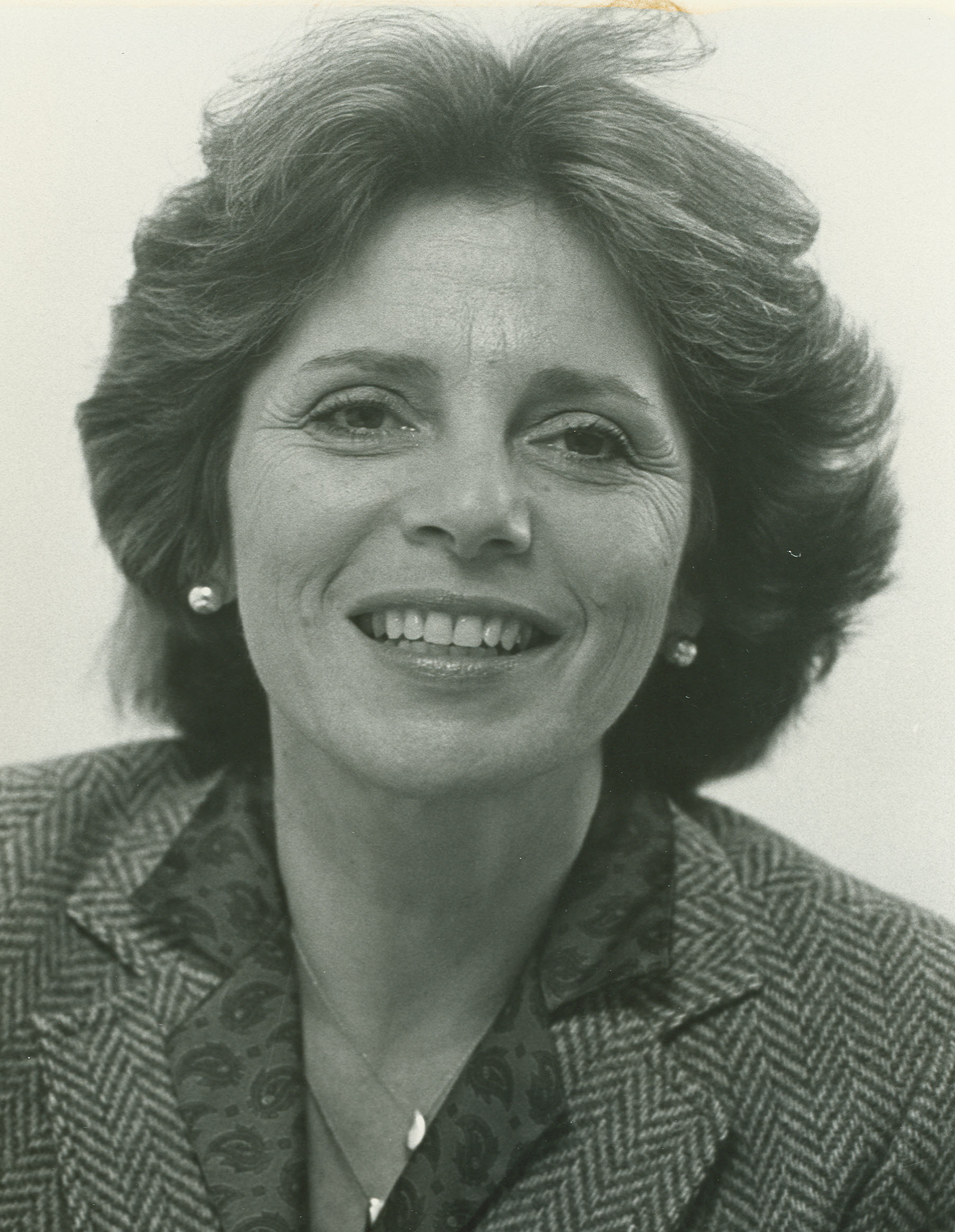

Nominee	Marge Roukema	Lee Monaco
Party	Republican	Democratic
Popular vote	175,562	54,828
Percentage	75.7%	23.6%
U.S. Representative before election
Marge Roukema
Republican
Elected U.S. Representative
Marge Roukema
Republican

Incumbent Marge Roukema won. This district included parts of Bergen, Passaic, and Sussex counties.

=== Republican primary ===
==== Candidates ====
- Marge Roukema, incumbent Representative from Ridgewood since 1981

==== Results ====
1988 Republican primary
Party	Candidate	Votes	%
Republican	Marge Roukema (incumbent)	19,101	100.00%
Total votes		19,101	100.00%

=== Democratic primary ===
==== Candidates ====
- Lee Monaco, Englewood prosecutor

==== Results ====
1988 Democratic primary
Party	Candidate	Votes	%
Democratic	Lee Monaco	14,166	100.00%
Total votes		14,166	100.00%

=== General election ===
==== Candidates ====
- Daniel M. Karlan (Libertarian)
- Lee Monaco, Englewood prosecutor (Democratic)
- Marge Roukema, incumbent Representative from Ridgewood since 1981 (Republican)

==== Campaign ====
Monaco ran a campaign calling for principles of natural law, "to clothe the naked, feed the hungry, shelter the homeless and care for the elderly" by restricting unnecessary military spending.

==== Results ====
1988 U.S. House election
Party	Candidate	Votes	%	±%
Republican	Marge Roukema (incumbent)	175,562	75.69%	▲7.69
Democratic	Lee Monaco	54,828	23.64%	▼8.36
Libertarian	Daniel M. Karlan	1,546	0.67%	N/A
Total votes		231,936	100.00%	
Republican hold		Swing	{{{swing}}}	

== District 6 ==
1988 New Jersey's 6th congressional district election
- November 8, 1988
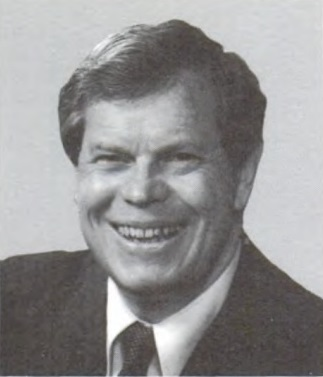

Nominee	Bernard J. Dwyer	Peter J. Sica
Party	Democratic	Republican
Popular vote	120,125	74,824
Percentage	61.1%	38.1%
U.S. Representative before election
Bernard J. Dwyer
Democratic
Elected U.S. Representative
Bernard J. Dwyer
Democratic

Incumbent Democrat Bernard J. Dwyer won. This district included parts of Middlesex, Monmouth and Union counties.

=== Democratic primary ===
==== Candidates ====
- Bernard J. Dwyer, incumbent Representative from Edison since 1981

==== Results ====
1988 Democratic primary
Party	Candidate	Votes	%
Democratic	Bernard J. Dwyer (incumbent)	32,303	100.00%
Total votes		32,303	100.00%

=== Republican primary ===
==== Candidates ====
- James G. Fennessy
- Peter J. Sica, mayor of Carteret

==== Results ====
1988 Republican primary
Party	Candidate	Votes	%
Republican	Peter J. Sica	5,047	72.10%
Republican	James G. Fennessy	1,953	27.90%
Total votes		7,000	100.00%

=== General election ===
==== Candidates ====
- Bernard J. Dwyer, incumbent Representative from Edison since 1981 (Democratic)
- Joan Paltrineri (Workers)
- Howard F. Schoen (Libertarian)
- Peter J. Sica, mayor of Carteret (Republican)

==== Results ====
1988 U.S. House election
Party	Candidate	Votes	%	±%
Democratic	Bernard J. Dwyer (incumbent)	120,125	61.10%	▼7.90
Republican	Peter J. Sica	74,824	38.06%	▲9.13
Socialist Workers	Joan Paltrineri	1,034	0.53%	N/A
Libertarian	Howard F. Schoen	615	0.31%	N/A
Total votes		196,598	100.00%	
Democratic hold		Swing	{{{swing}}}	

== District 7 ==
1988 New Jersey's 7th congressional district election
- November 8, 1988
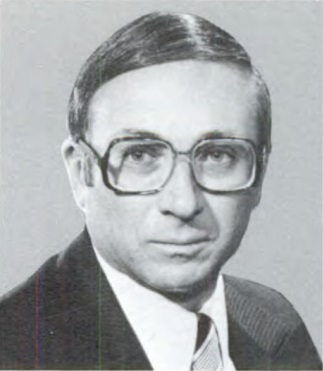

Nominee	Matt Rinaldo	James Hely
Party	Republican	Democratic
Popular vote	153,350	52,189
Percentage	74.6%	25.4%
U.S. Representative before election
Matt Rinaldo
Republican
Elected U.S. Representative
Matt Rinaldo
Republican

Incumbent Matt Rinaldo won. This district included parts of Essex, Middlesex, Somerset, and Union counties.

=== Republican primary ===
==== Candidates ====
- Matt Rinaldo, incumbent Representative from Union since 1973

==== Results ====
1988 Republican primary
Party	Candidate	Votes	%
Republican	Matt Rinaldo (incumbent)	18,018	100.00%
Total votes		18,018	100.00%

=== Democratic primary ===
==== Candidates ====
- James Hely, lawyer and member of the Westfield Town Council

==== Results ====
1988 Democratic primary
Party	Candidate	Votes	%
Democratic	James Hely	20,198	100.00%
Total votes		20,198	100.00%

=== General election ===
==== Candidates ====
- James Hely, lawyer and member of the Westfield Town Council (Democratic)
- Matt Rinaldo, incumbent Representative from Union since 1973 (Republican)

==== Results ====
1988 U.S. House election
Party	Candidate	Votes	%	±%
Republican	Matt Rinaldo (incumbent)	153,350	74.61%	▼4.43
Democratic	James Hely	52,189	25.39%	▲4.43
Total votes		205,539	100.00%	
Republican hold		Swing	{{{swing}}}	

== District 8 ==
1988 New Jersey's 8th congressional district election
- November 8, 1988
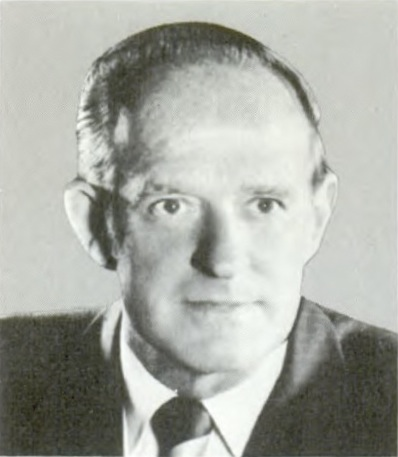

Nominee	Robert A. Roe
Party	Democratic
Popular vote	96,035
Percentage	100.0%
U.S. Representative before election
Robert A. Roe
Democratic
Elected U.S. Representative
Robert A. Roe
Democratic

Incumbent Robert Roe won without opposition. This district included parts of Bergen, Essex, Morris and Passaic counties.

=== Democratic primary ===
==== Candidates ====
- Robert A. Roe, incumbent Representative from Wayne since 1969

==== Results ====
1988 Democratic primary
Party	Candidate	Votes	%
Democratic	Robert A. Roe (incumbent)	19,173	100.00%
Total votes		19,173	100.00%

=== General election ===
==== Candidates ====
- Robert A. Roe, incumbent Representative from Wayne since 1969 (Democratic)

==== Results ====
1988 U.S. House election
Party	Candidate	Votes	%	±%
Democratic	Robert A. Roe	96,035	100.00%	▲37.21
Total votes		96,035	100.00%	
Democratic hold		Swing	{{{swing}}}	

== District 9 ==
1988 New Jersey's 9th congressional district election
- November 8, 1988
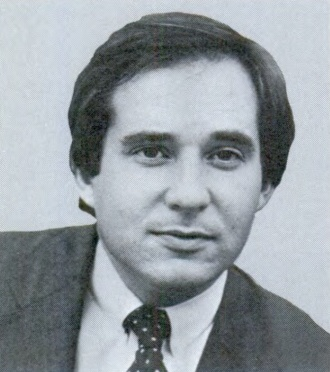

Nominee	Bob Torricelli	Roger J. Lane
Party	Democratic	Republican
Popular vote	142,012	68,363
Percentage	67.1%	32.3%
U.S. Representative before election
Bob Torricelli
Democratic
Elected U.S. Representative
Bob Torricelli
Democratic

Incumbent Democrat Bob Torricelli won. This district consisted of parts of Bergen and Hudson counties.

=== Democratic primary ===
==== Candidates ====
- Bob Torricelli, incumbent Representative from Englewood since 1983

==== Results ====
1988 Democratic primary
Party	Candidate	Votes	%
Democratic	Robert G. Torricelli (incumbent)	30,995	100.00%
Total votes		30,995	100.00%

=== Republican primary ===
==== Candidates ====
- Roger J. Lane, mayor of New Milford

==== Results ====
1988 Republican primary
Party	Candidate	Votes	%
Republican	Roger J. Lane	7,872	100.00%
Total votes		7,872	100.00%

=== General election ===
==== Candidates ====
- Richard J. Kemly (Poor Man's)
- Roger J. Lane, mayor of New Milford (Republican)
- Bob Torricelli, incumbent Representative from Englewood since 1983 (Democratic)

==== Results ====
1988 U.S. House election
Party	Candidate	Votes	%	±%
Democratic	Bob Torricelli (incumbent)	142,012	67.15%	▼1.87
Republican	Roger J. Lane	68,363	32.32%	▲1.34
Independent	Richard J. Kemly	1,119	0.53%	N/A
Total votes		211,494	100.00%	
Democratic hold		Swing	{{{swing}}}	

== District 10 ==
1988 New Jersey's 10th congressional district election
- November 8, 1988
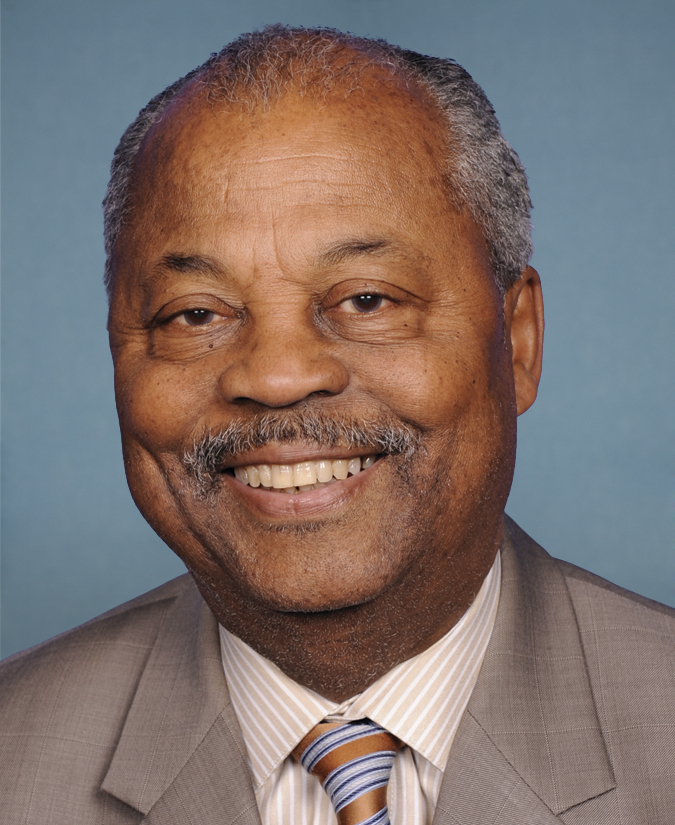

Nominee	Donald M. Payne	Michael Webb
Party	Democratic	Republican
Popular vote	84,681	13,848
Percentage	77.4%	12.6%
U.S. Representative before election
Peter W. Rodino
Democratic
Elected U.S. Representative
Donald M. Payne
Democratic

Incumbent Democrat Donald M. Payne won. The district included parts of Essex and Union counties.

Payne was the first black Representative elected from New Jersey; this district, which had been majority-black since 1973, had long been expected to elect a black Representative upon Rodino's retirement.

=== Democratic primary ===
==== Candidates ====
- Ralph T. Grant Jr., member of the Newark City Council
- Donald M. Payne, member of the Newark City Council and candidate for this district in 1980 and 1986

===== Declined =====
- Peter W. Rodino, incumbent Representative since 1949

==== Results ====
1988 Democratic primary
Party	Candidate	Votes	%
Democratic	Donald M. Payne	40,608	73.15%
Democratic	Ralph T. Grant Jr.	14,908	26.85%
Total votes		55,516	100.00%

=== Republican primary ===
==== Candidates ====
- Michael Webb, U.S. Department of Education program coordinator

==== Results ====
1988 Republican primary
Party	Candidate	Votes	%
Republican	Michael Webb	562	100.00%
Total votes		562	100.00%

=== General election ===
==== Candidates ====
- Alan Bowser (Independent)
- Mindy Bridno (Socialist Workers)
- Alvin Curtis (Time for Change)
- Donald M. Payne, member of the Newark City Council and candidate for this district in 1980 and 1986 (Democratic)
- Michael Webb, U.S. Department of Education program coordinator (Republican)

===== Withdrew =====
- Anthony Imperiale, former state senator, assemblyman and member of the Newark City Council (People's Choice)

==== Results ====
1988 U.S. House election
Party	Candidate	Votes	%	±%
Democratic	Donald M. Payne	84,681	77.35%	▼18.59
Republican	Michael Webb	13,848	12.65%	N/A
Independent	Anthony Imperiale (withdrawn)	5,422	4.95%	N/A
Socialist Workers	Mindy Bridno	4,539	4.15%	▲0.09
Independent	Alvin Curtis	551	0.50%	N/A
Independent	Alan Bowser	432	0.39%	N/A
Total votes		109,473	100.00%	
Democratic hold		Swing	{{{swing}}}	

== District 11 ==
1988 New Jersey's 11th congressional district election
- November 8, 1988
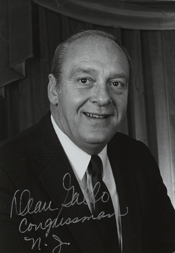

Nominee	Dean Gallo	John C. Shaw
Party	Republican	Democratic
Popular vote	154,654	64,773
Percentage	70.5%	29.5%
U.S. Representative before election
Dean Gallo
Republican
Elected U.S. Representative
Dean Gallo
Republican

Incumbent Republican Dean Gallo won. This district consisted of parts of Essex, Morris, Sussex and Warren counties.

=== Republican primary ===
==== Candidates ====
- Dean Gallo, incumbent Representative since 1985

==== Results ====
1988 Republican primary
Party	Candidate	Votes	%
Republican	Dean Gallo (incumbent)	24,629	100.00%
Total votes		24,629	100.00%

=== Democratic primary ===
==== Candidates ====
- John C. Shaw, supervisor in the office of the Essex County Clerk

==== Results ====
1988 Democratic primary
Party	Candidate	Votes	%
Democratic	John C. Shaw	15,478	100.00%
Total votes		15,478	100.00%

=== General election ===
==== Candidates ====
- John C. Shaw, supervisor in the office of the Essex County Clerk (Democratic)
- Dean Gallo, incumbent Representative since 1985 (Republican)
- Jasper Gould (Populist)

==== Results ====
1988 U.S. House election
Party	Candidate	Votes	%	±%
Republican	Dean Gallo (incumbent)	154,654	70.48%	▲2.46
Democratic	John C. Shaw	64,773	29.52%	▼2.46
Total votes		219,427	100.00%	
Republican hold		Swing	{{{swing}}}	

== District 12 ==
1988 New Jersey's 12th congressional district election
- November 8, 1988
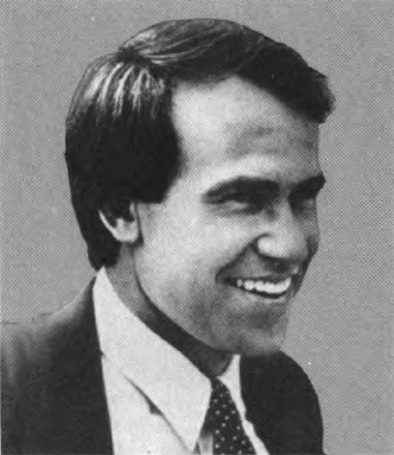

Nominee	Jim Courter	Norman Weinstein
Party	Republican	Democratic
Popular vote	165,918	71,596
Percentage	69.3%	29.9%
U.S. Representative before election
Jim Courter
Republican
Elected U.S. Representative
Jim Courter
Republican

Incumbent Republican Jim Courter won. This sprawling district included all of Hunterdon County and parts of Mercer, Middlesex, Morris, Somerset, Sussex, and Warren counties.

=== Republican primary ===
==== Candidates ====
- Jim Courter, incumbent Representative since 1979
- Thomas J. Young

==== Results ====
1988 Republican primary
Party	Candidate	Votes	%
Republican	Jim Courter (incumbent)	25,816	89.04%
Republican	Thomas J. Young	3,177	10.96%
Total votes		28,993	100.00%

=== Democratic primary ===
==== Candidates ====
- Norman J. Weinstein, former president of the Somerville Borough Council and candidate for this district in 1984

==== Results ====
1988 Democratic primary
Party	Candidate	Votes	%
Democratic	Norman J. Weinstein	20,599	100.00%
Total votes		20,599	100.00%

=== General election ===
==== Candidates ====
- Jim Courter, incumbent Representative since 1979 (Republican)
- Stephen Friedlander (Libertarian)
- Norman J. Weinstein, former president of the Somerville Borough Council and candidate for this district in 1984 (Democratic)

==== Campaign ====
Despite the district's strong Republican lean, Courter ran an active campaign with frequent television advertising which made no mention of his re-election bid, in order to raise his profile ahead of an anticipated 1989 run for governor.

Weinstein criticized Courter's record on environmental legislation; he received the lowest rating in the New Jersey delegation from the League of Conservation Voters. Courter defended the attack by citing bills he had sponsored protecting clean air and water and restricting offshore dumping and oil drilling. Weinstein also criticized Courter's call to follow Michigan, Florida and New York in restricting lawsuits for all but the most serious automobile injuries and allowing automobile insurers to establish rates, rather than the state government.

==== Results ====
1988 U.S. House election
Party	Candidate	Votes	%	±%
Republican	Jim Courter (incumbent)	165,918	69.27%	▲5.78
Democratic	Norman J. Weinstein	71,596	29.89%	▼6.62
Libertarian	Stephen Friedlander	2,023	0.84%	N/A
Total votes		239,537	100.00%	
Republican hold		Swing	{{{swing}}}	

== District 13 ==
1988 New Jersey's 13th congressional district election
- November 8, 1988
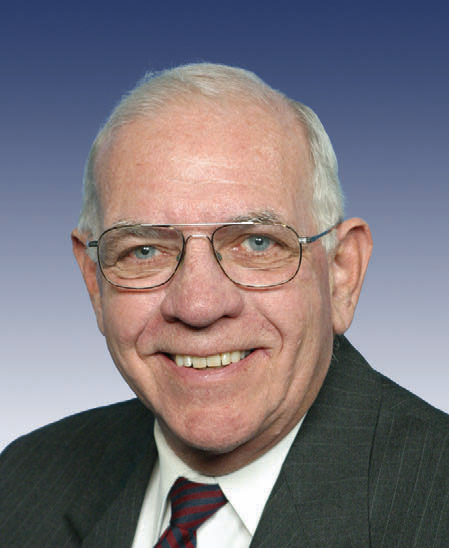

Nominee	Jim Saxton	Jim Smith
Party	Republican	Democratic
Popular vote	167,470	73,561
Percentage	69.5%	30.5%
U.S. Representative before election
Jim Saxton
Republican
Elected U.S. Representative
Jim Saxton
Republican

Incumbent Republican Jim Saxton won. This district included parts of Burlington, Camden, and Ocean counties.

=== Republican primary ===
==== Candidates ====
- Jim Saxton, incumbent Representative since 1984

==== Results ====
1988 Republican primary
Party	Candidate	Votes	%
Republican	Jim Saxton (incumbent)	23,282	100.00%
Total votes		23,282	100.00%

=== Democratic primary ===
==== Candidates ====
- Michael DiMarco
- James B. Smith, former mayor of Mount Holly and nominee for this district in 1984

==== Results ====
1988 Democratic primary
Party	Candidate	Votes	%
Democratic	James B. Smith	20,109	87.02%
Democratic	Michael DiMarco	3,000	12.98%
Total votes		23,109	100.00%

=== General election ===
==== Candidates ====
- Jim Saxton, incumbent Representative since 1984 (Republican)
- James B. Smith, former mayor of Mount Holly and nominee for this district in 1984 (Democratic)

==== Campaign ====
Saxton ran on his support for preserving Social Security benefits and providing home healthcare for the elderly, along with Ronald Reagan's economic program, which he credited for "the economic growth and low unemployment... that we have enjoyed for the last few years."

Smith said he supported trade restrictions on foreign imports to protect American jobs and industry; Saxton supported Reagan's decision to veto such restrictions. Smith also called for the restoration of "impact aid" for public school districts serving families of military personnel, a large number of which lived in this district.

==== Results ====
1988 U.S. House election
Party	Candidate	Votes	%	±%
Republican	Jim Saxton (incumbent)	167,470	69.48%	▲4.12
Democratic	James B. Smith	73,561	30.52%	▼4.12
Total votes		241,031	100.00%	
Republican hold		Swing	{{{swing}}}	

== District 14 ==
1988 New Jersey's 14th congressional district election
- November 8, 1988
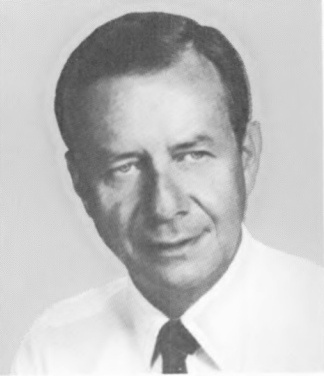

Nominee	Frank Guarini	Fred Theemling Jr.
Party	Democratic	Republican
Popular vote	104,001	47,293
Percentage	67.3%	30.6%
U.S. Representative before election
Frank J. Guarini
Democratic
Elected U.S. Representative
Frank J. Guarini
Democratic

Incumbent Democrat Frank J. Guarini won. This district included parts Hudson County.

=== Democratic primary ===
==== Candidates ====
- Edward A. Allen, pastor of Philemon Missionary Baptist Church in Newark
- Frank J. Guarini, incumbent Representative since 1979
- Robert P. Haney Jr., Jersey City attorney and barkeeper

==== Endorsements ====
Frank J. Guarini (incumbent)

Local officials

- Dennis P. Collins, mayor of Bayonne
- Nicholas J. Cicco, mayor of Guttenberg
- Anthony R. Cucci, mayor of Jersey City
- Anthony De Fino, mayor of West New York
- Leo Gattoni, mayor of North Bergen
- Henry J. Hill, mayor of Kearny
- Stanley Iacono, mayor of Weehawken
- Bob Menendez, mayor of Union City
- Patrick Pasculli, mayor of Hoboken
- Frank E. Rodgers, mayor of Harrison
Robert P. Haney Jr.

Federal executive branch officials

- Ted Sorensen, former White House Counsel

Local officials

- Glenn Cunningham, president of the Jersey City Council
- Four other members of the Jersey City Council

Organizations

- Indian-American Political Action Club
- Indo-American Association of Hudson County Inc.
- Irish-American Civic Association

==== Results ====
1988 Democratic primary
Party	Candidate	Votes	%
Democratic	Frank J. Guarini (incumbent)	35,964	67.01%
Democratic	Robert P. Haney Jr.	10,680	19.90%
Democratic	Edward A. Allen	7,027	13.09%
Total votes		53,671	100.00%

=== Republican primary ===
==== Candidates ====
- James V. McNally
- Louis Russo

==== Results ====
1988 Republican primary
Party	Candidate	Votes	%
Republican	James V. McNally	5,370	76.61%
Republican	Louis Russo	1,639	23.38%
Total votes		7,009	100.00%

After the primary, Russo was replaced by Fred Theemling Jr. on the general election ballot.

=== General election ===
==== Candidates ====
- Peter Galbo (Independent)
- Frank J. Guarini, incumbent Representative since 1979 (Democratic)
- John A. Jones ("All-Peoples Congress")
- John Rummel (Communist)
- Fred J. Theemling Jr., former Hudson County assistant prosecutor (Republican)
- Christopher White (Libertarian)

==== Results ====
1988 U.S. House election
Party	Candidate	Votes	%	±%
Democratic	Frank J. Guarini (incumbent)	104,001	67.34%	▼3.33
Republican	Fred J. Theemling Jr.	47,293	30.62%	▲3.92
Independent	John A. Jones	1,346	0.87%	N/A
Libertarian	Christopher White	1,006	0.65%	N/A
Communist	John Rummel	442	0.29%	N/A
Independent	Peter Galbo	353	0.23%	N/A
Total votes		154,440	100.00%	
Democratic hold		Swing	{{{swing}}}	
