= Eagleton =

Eagleton may refer to:

== People ==
- Eagleton (surname)

== Places ==
- Eagleton, New South Wales, Australia
- Eagleton, Wisconsin, United States
- Eagleton Village, Tennessee, United States
- Eagleton, a hamlet adjoining (or within) Pabail Iarach in Point, Outer Hebrides, Scotland
- Eagleton, fictional town in Indiana, from the show Parks and Recreation

== Other ==
- Eagleton Institute of Politics at Rutgers University in New Brunswick, New Jersey
- "Eagleton" (Parks and Recreation), an episode of the comedy series Parks and Recreation
