= John Farmer Jr. =

American politician (born 1957)

Director of the Eagleton Institute of Politics
- Incumbent
- Assumed office September 1, 2019
- Preceded by: Ruth B. Mandel

Acting Governor of New Jersey
- In office January 8, 2002 (12:00 PM–1:30 PM)
- Preceded by: Donald DiFrancesco
- Succeeded by: John O. Bennett (acting)

52nd Attorney General of New Jersey
- In office June 3, 1999 – January 15, 2002
- Governor: Christine Todd Whitman; Donald DiFrancesco
- Preceded by: Peter Verniero
- Succeeded by: David Samson

Chief Counsel to the Governor of New Jersey
- In office 1997–1999
- Governor: Christine Todd Whitman
- Preceded by: Michael Torpey
- Succeeded by: Richard Mroz

Deputy Chief Counsel to the Governor of New Jersey
- In office 1996–1997
- Governor: Christine Todd Whitman
- Preceded by: Michael Torpey
- Succeeded by: Jessica Furey

Personal details
- Born: June 24, 1957 (age 69) Jersey City, New Jersey, U.S.
- Party: Independent
- Education: Georgetown University (BA, JD)

John J. Farmer Jr. (born June 24, 1957) is an American author, lawyer, politician, and jurist. He was the director of the Eagleton Institute of Politics, where he also led the Miller Center for Community Protection and Resilience (CPR). He served as acting governor of New Jersey for 90 minutes on January 8, 2002, by virtue of his status as New Jersey Attorney General.

== Early life and education ==
Farmer was born in Jersey City, New Jersey, in 1957. He attended Georgetown University, where he received a B.A. degree in 1979 and a J.D. degree in 1986.

== Career ==
After law school, he worked as a clerk for New Jersey Supreme Court Justice Alan B. Handler. From 1988 to 1990, he was an associate in the law firm of Riker, Danzig, Scherer, Hyland & Perretti in Morristown. From 1990 to 1994, he was an Assistant United States Attorney for the District of New Jersey.

=== Whitman administration ===
In 1997, Governor Christine Todd Whitman appointed Farmer as chief counsel, after having served as deputy chief counsel and assistant counsel to the governor.

Farmer was nominated to be New Jersey Attorney General on March 15, 1999, and was sworn in the following June after being confirmed unanimously by the New Jersey Senate. He continued to serve under Donald DiFrancesco after Whitman's resignation.

=== Acting governor ===
Farmer served as Acting Governor for 90 minutes on January 8, 2002. Following Governor Christine Todd Whitman's resignation the previous year to become head of the EPA, Farmer was one of four people to serve as acting governor for the one-year period between Whitman's resignation and Jim McGreevey's inauguration, along with three different senate presidents, Donald DiFrancesco, John O. Bennett, and Richard Codey. DiFrancesco served as acting governor for all but the last week of this period, when his term as senate president ended with the mandate of the outgoing senate on January 8, 2002, while newly elected governor Jim McGreevey would not be inaugurated before January 15, 2002.

The state did not have the position of lieutenant governor until 2010, and succession rules specified that the next in line for governor after the Senate President and the Speaker of the Assembly, which both became vacant on January 8, would be the Attorney General until the next Senate President could be sworn in or until an Acting Senate President could be elected. This automatically made Farmer Acting Governor. Farmer served as Acting Governor for 90 minutes until Republican Senator John O. Bennett and Democratic Senator Richard Codey were duly elected and sworn in as co-presidents of the senate, as the Senate had been evenly split between the two parties. They agreed to evenly divide the remaining week in the gubernatorial term, with Bennett serving from January 8, 2002, to January 12, 2002; and Codey serving from January 12, 2002, to January 15, 2002.

As a result, the state had five different people serving as governor during a period of eight days: DiFrancesco, Farmer, Bennett, Codey, and McGreevey. In 2018, political journalist David Wildstein speculated that, as Robert E. Littell served as acting president of the senate until Bennett and Codey assumed the role, it's possible that "maybe" Littell assumed the governorship for "a few minutes" as well. However, Littell is not included on a list of governors of the state published by the National Governors Association.

=== 9/11 Commission senior counsel ===
Farmer subsequently acted as senior counsel to the 9/11 Commission, chaired by former New Jersey Governor Thomas Kean.

Farmer's book, The Ground Truth: The Untold Story of America Under Attack On 9/11, was released days before the eighth anniversary of the 9/11 attacks. In "The Ground Truth," Farmer made the following controversial statement: "At some level of government," says Dean Farmer, "at some point in time, a decision was made not to tell the truth about the national response to the attacks on the morning of 9/11. We owe the truth to the families of the victims of 9/11. We owe it to the American public as well, because only by understanding what has gone wrong in the past can we assure our nation's safety in the future."

On January 21, 2010, he appeared on The Colbert Report.

In July 2011, he was appointed the 13th (and tie-breaking) member of New Jersey's Congressional Redistricting Commission by both its Democratic and Republican members. New Jersey lost one Congressional seat in redistricting and the panel redrew the congressional districts, determining which seat was lost.

=== Rutgers University ===
Farmer has served as dean of Rutgers School of Law–Newark. In his tenure, In conjunction with Rutgers Law Review, Farmer planned a multi-day symposium to address the many legal uncertainties in national security policies and practices following the September 11 terrorist attacks. The symposium featured Thomas Kean, Michael Chertoff, John Joseph Gibbons, and others. Two United States Supreme Court justices, Stephen Breyer and Samuel Alito, also have spoken at the law school. Prior to his deanship, Farmer practiced law as a partner in a North Jersey firm he founded, and was an adjunct professor of law at the Rutgers School of Law–Newark. He also regularly contributes to The Star-Ledger, The New York Times, and other publications.

On April 11, 2013, he was appointed as the senior vice president and general counsel at Rutgers University in New Brunswick, New Jersey.

On August 19, 2019, Farmer was appointed by Chancellor Christopher J. Molloy to succeed Ruth B. Mandel as the director of the Eagleton Institute of Politics at Rutgers University.

Legal offices
Preceded by Peter Verniero	New Jersey Attorney General; 1999-2002	Succeeded by David Samson
Political offices
Preceded by Donald DiFrancesco; Governor	Acting Governor of New Jersey; January 8, 2002 (12:00 PM-1:30PM)	Succeeded by John O. Bennett; Acting Governor
