= Mayors Climate Protection Center =

The Mayors Climate Protection Center, founded in 2007 as a subgroup of the U.S. Conference of Mayors, is dedicated to providing mayors with "the guidance and assistance they need to lead their cities’ efforts to reduce the greenhouse gas emissions that are linked to climate change."

The initiative was promoted by Seattle mayor Greg Nickels. Douglas Palmer, Mayor of Trenton, said that the Conference of Mayors had, for decades "...formally adopted and actively promoted policy positions on a range of issues affecting energy production and use and its impact on the environment."

== Climate Protection Agreement ==
Seattle Mayor Greg Nickels began the "U.S. Mayors Climate Protection Agreement" in 2005 that seeks the pledges of mayors from all 50 states to take action to reduce greenhouse gas emissions by 5.2% from 1990 levels by the year 2012, in line with the Kyoto Protocol.

Many mayors have joined the agreement since its announcement:

- By July 2007, 600 mayors had signed the agreement.
- By October 2009, 1,000 mayors representing over 86 million residents signed the agreement.
