= Eric Jackson (mayor) =

American politician

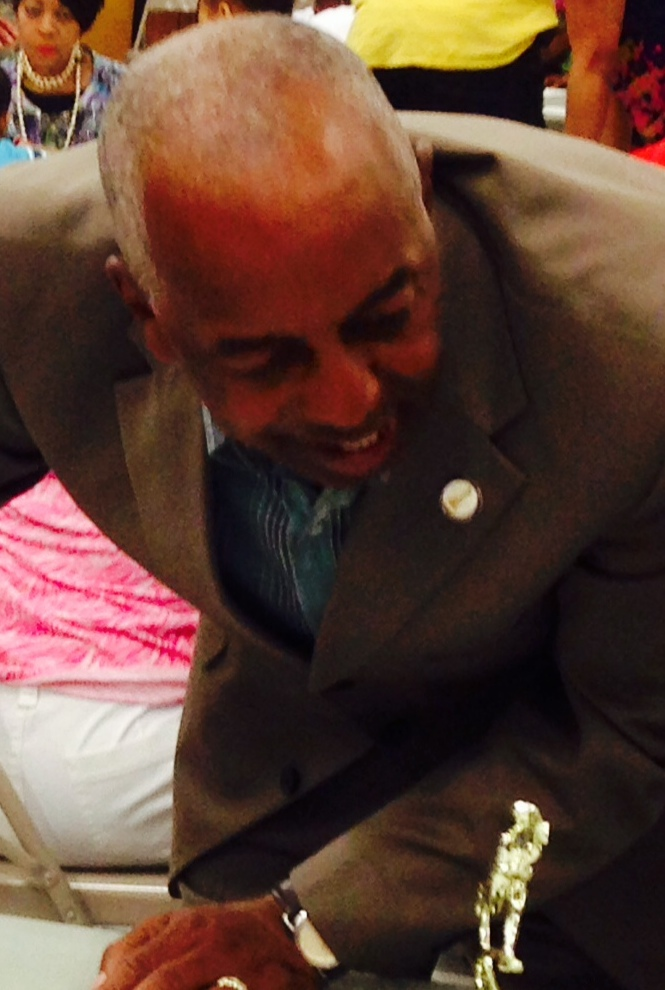

48th Mayor of Trenton
- In office July 1, 2014 – July 1, 2018
- Preceded by: George Muschal
- Succeeded by: Reed Gusciora

Personal details
- Born: 1959 (age 66–67) Trenton, New Jersey, U.S.
- Party: Democratic

Eric Jackson was the 48th mayor of Trenton, the capital of New Jersey, having assumed office on July 1, 2014 for a four-year term. In January 2018 he announced he would not seek re-election.

== Background ==
Jackson was born and raised in Trenton. He attended public schools and the Hun School in Princeton. He received his degree in public administration at Fairleigh Dickinson University after which he worked for Citibank for seven years. He later became Director of Operations and Personnel for the nonprofit Henry J. Austin Center, a Trenton-based primary health care provider. Jackson worked for the City of Trenton including several policy and administrative positions, finally becoming the Director of Public Works. In September 2011, he took a job as director of the Department of Public Works and Urban Development in Plainfield, New Jersey but received a residency waiver so he could still live in Trenton.

== Election ==
In 2010 Jackson ran for mayor and lost a run-off election by three votes to then-Councilman Manuel Segura for the chance to challenge the eventual winner, Tony F. Mack.

He won the run-off election of June 10, 2014. On June 17, the mayor-elect met with Governor Chris Christie who pledged his support and willingness to work with the incoming administration. Jackson was sworn in on July 1, 2014.
