= Arthur Holland =

Arthur Holland may refer to:

- Arthur Holland (British Army officer) (1862–1927), British Conservative and Unionist Member of Parliament for Northampton
- Arthur John Holland (1918–1989), mayor of Trenton, New Jersey
- Bud Holland (Arthur A. Holland, died 1994), American aviator and B-52 pilot from Suffolk, Virginia
- Arthur Holland (referee) (1916–1987), English football referee of the 1950s and '60s
