= Eagleton (surname) =

Eagleton is an English surname. Notable people with the surname include:

- Aileen Eagleton (1902–1984), English artist
- Christophe Eagleton (born 1982), American composer
- Florence Peshine Eagleton (1870–1956), women's suffrage advocate
- Nathan Eagleton (born 1978), Australian-rules footballer
- Norma Eagleton (1934–2025), American politician
- Stephen Eagleton (born 1976), Australian soccer player
- Terry Eagleton (born 1943), English literary critic and philosopher
- Thomas Eagleton (1929–2007), American politician
- William L. Eagleton (1926–2011), American writer and diplomat

== Fictional characters ==
- Betty Eagleton (née Pendagast), fictional character on the ITV soap opera Emmerdale
