= Eagleton Institute of Politics =

Research institute at Rutgers University

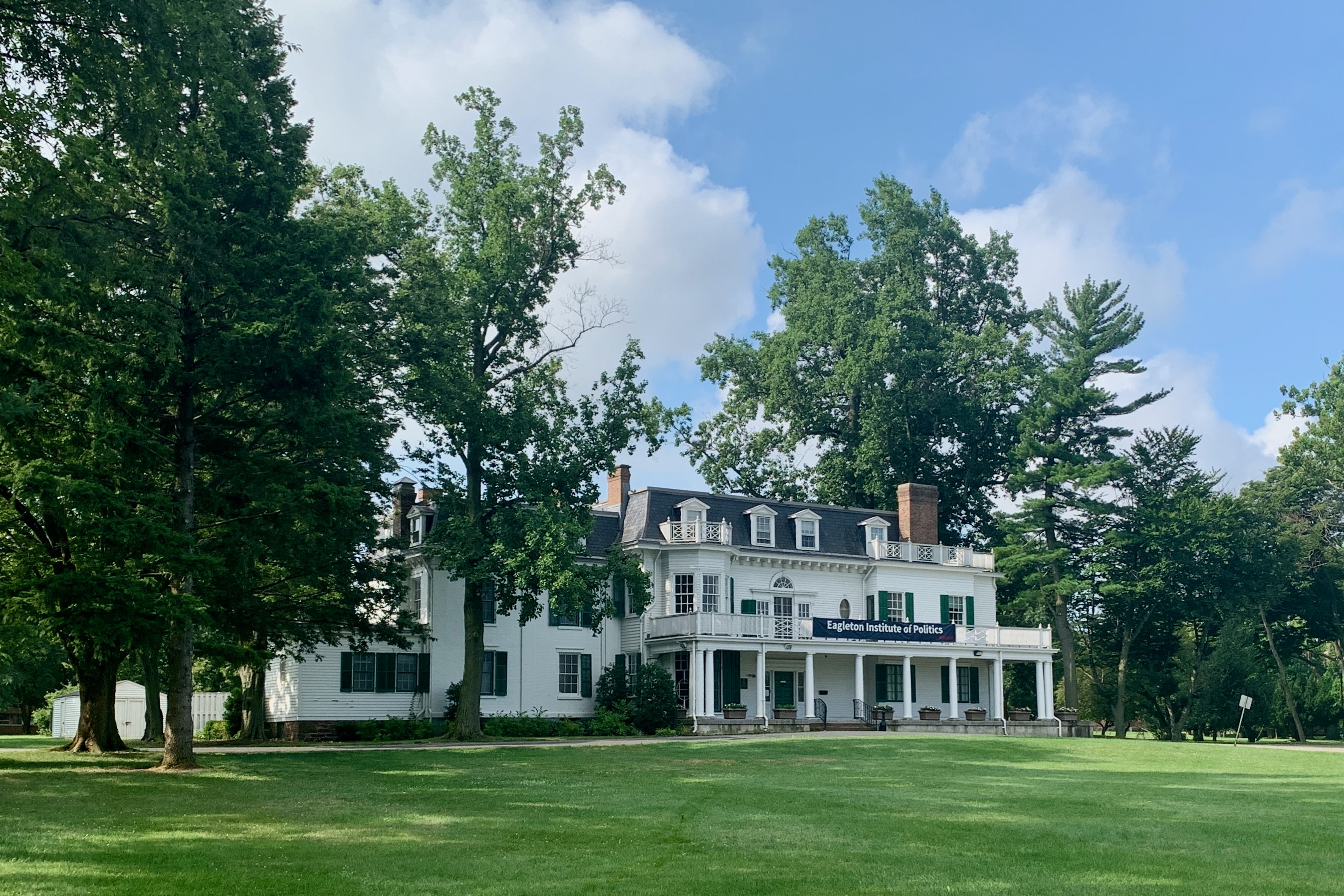
- Wood Lawn at the Eagleton Institute of Politics
- Established: 1956
- Research type: State and national politics
- Director: Elizabeth C. Matto
- Location: New Brunswick, New Jersey, United States; 40°28′54″N 74°25′59″W
- Operating agency: Rutgers University

The Eagleton Institute of Politics at Rutgers University was established in 1956 with an endowment from Florence Peshine Eagleton (1870–1953), and it focuses on state and national politics through education and public service. Ruth Mandel served as director for over 20 years, before being succeeded in that role by John Farmer Jr. in September, 2019, and Elizabeth C. Matto in September, 2022.

The institute is located at the Cook-Douglass Campus in New Brunswick, New Jersey, and is housed at Wood Lawn, which is listed on the New Jersey Register of Historic Places and National Register of Historic Places.

== Background ==
Florence Peshine Eagleton was a suffragist and a founder of the New Jersey League of Women Voters. She advocated for increased access to higher education for women. She was one of the first women to serve as a trustee of Rutgers University. She left more than $1,000,000 in her will to establish the Wells Phillips Eagleton and Florence Peshine Eagleton Foundation, which became the Eagleton Institute of Politics at Rutgers University.

== Centers and program ==
The Eagleton Institute of Politics has several centers and programs:

- The Center for American Women and Politics (CAWP) aims to promote greater knowledge and understanding about women's participation in politics and government and to enhance women's influence and leadership in public life.
- The Eagleton Center for Public Interest Polling, established in 1971, conducts several statewide public opinion surveys each year and contracts with government agencies and non-profit organizations for contract polling work.
- The Center on the American Governor seeks to promote research and discussion on the role of state governors in the United States. The center is building an extensive virtual archive and sponsors a range of academic activities and public forums on topics and issues relating to the office of governor across the country as well as the administrations of selected holders of the office in New Jersey and other states.
- The Center for Youth Political Participation (CYPP), through research, public service, and educational programs, is dedicated to exploring civic education at the high school level and political participation among young adults. CYPP initiatives include RU Ready RU Voting, State House Express, the Young Elected Leaders Project, and the Darien Civic Engagement Project

Other Eagleton programs and initiatives include:

- Clifford P. Case Professorship of Public Affairs – established by the university's board of governors in 1980 and named in honor of Clifford P. Case, longtime U.S. senator from New Jersey. The holder of the professional typically visits one of Rutgers' three campuses for a few days each year. Past holders have included George J. Mitchell, Olympia Snowe, Lee H. Hamilton, Chuck Hagel, J. William Fulbright, and former president Gerald R. Ford.
- Arthur J. Holland Program on Ethics in Government – established in 1989 and named after Arthur John Holland, longtime mayor of Trenton. The program organizes an annual lecture at the university as well as workshop at the New Jersey League of Municipalities' Atlantic City conference. The program also awards a stipend "to support a student undertaking a project designed to promote ethics in government."

== Eagleton staff ==
- Elizabeth C. Matto – director of the institute, director of the Center for Youth Political Participation
- John Weingart – associate director and author of Waste is a Terrible Thing to Mind
- Debbie Walsh – director of the institute's Center for American Women and Politics
- Ashley Koning – director of the institute's Eagleton Center for Public Interest Polling
