= Wood Lawn (New Brunswick, New Jersey) =

Historic house in New Jersey, United States

- U.S. National Register of Historic Places
- New Jersey Register of Historic Places
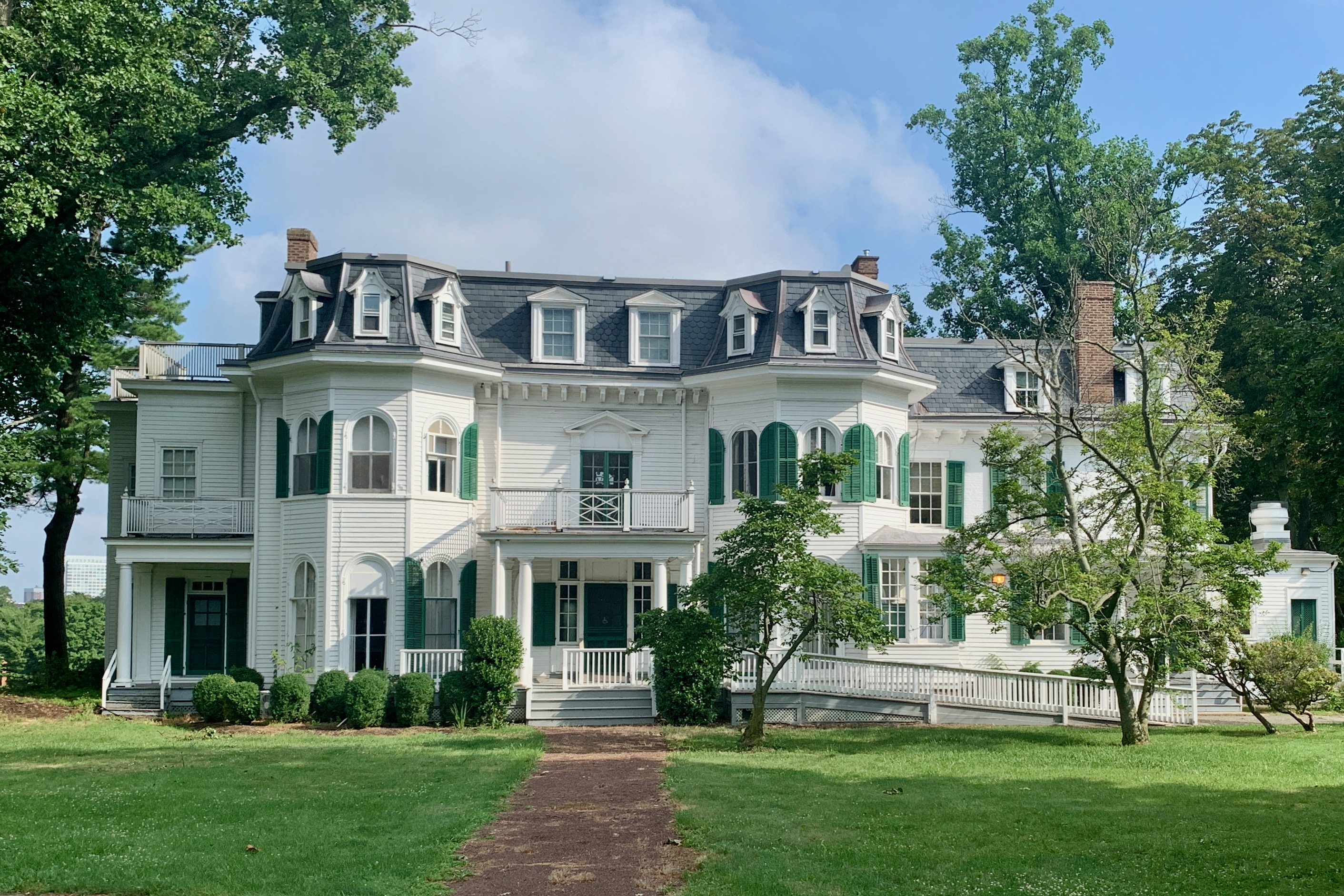
- Wood Lawn in 2020

- Location within Middlesex County, New Jersey Location within New Jersey Location within the United States
- Location: Cook Douglass Campus, Rutgers University, New Brunswick, New Jersey
- Coordinates: 40°28′54″N 74°25′59″W
- Built: 1830
- Architect: McKim, Mead & White
- Architectural style: Classical Revival
- NRHP reference No.: 78001772
- NJRHP No.: 1883

Significant dates
- Added to NRHP: March 8, 1978
- Designated NJRHP: April 15, 1977

Wood Lawn is a historic mansion located off Ryders Lane on the Cook Douglass Campus of Rutgers University in the city of New Brunswick in Middlesex County, New Jersey. The house was added to the National Register of Historic Places on March 8, 1978, for its significance in architecture and education. It is currently used by the Eagleton Institute of Politics.

== History and description ==
The house was built by Colonel James Neilson (1784–1862) in 1830 on land purchased in 1720 by his mother's grandfather, Johannis Voorhees. Neilson served on the Rutgers Board of Trustees from 1833 to 1862. In 1850, a kitchen wing was added. In 1868, bay window extensions were added by his son, James Neilson (1844–1937), who was a trustee from 1886 until 1937. The last major changes were made by the architectural firm of McKim, Mead & White in 1905. The previous Victorian architecture was transformed into its present Classical Revival style.

== Gallery ==
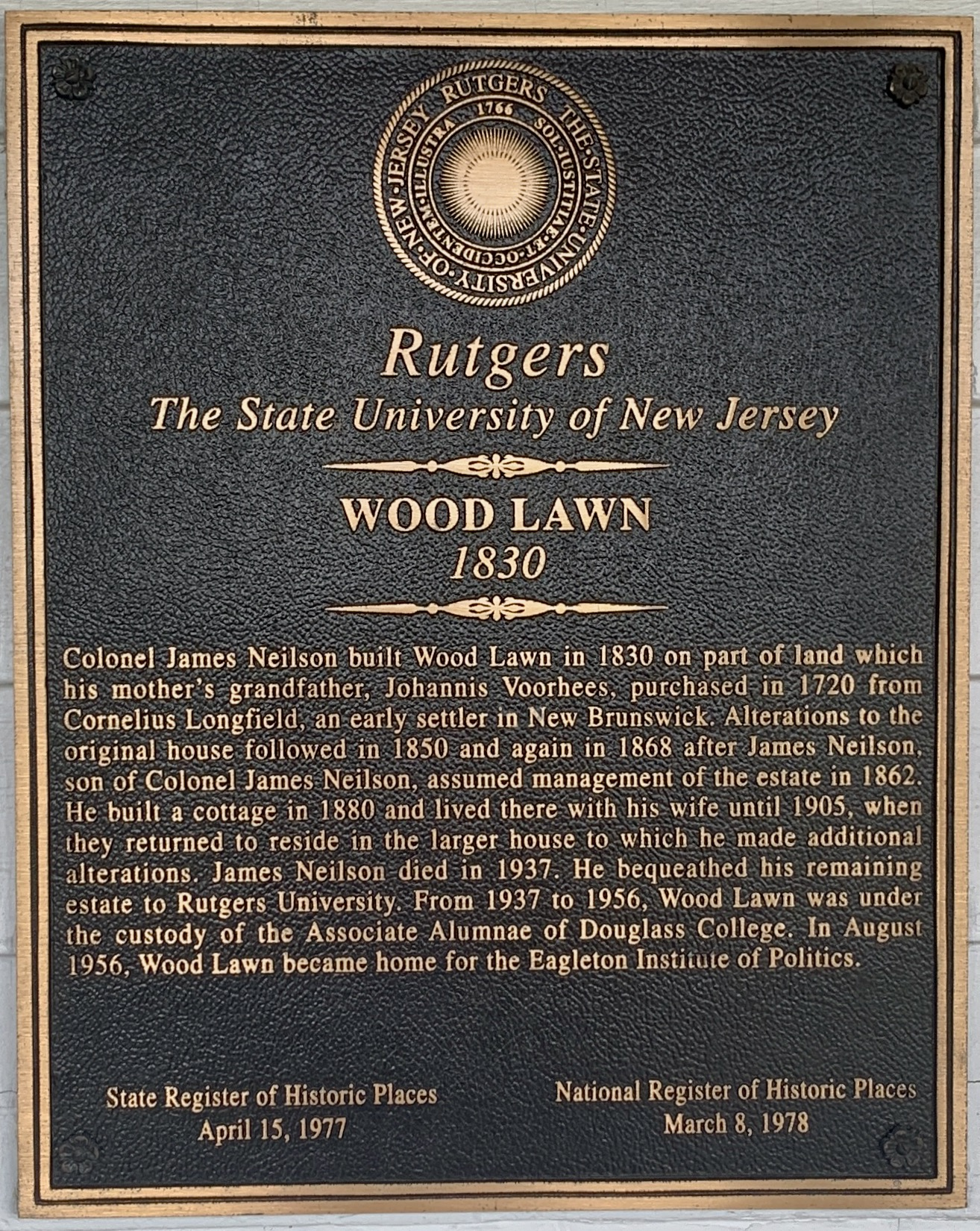
NRHP plaque

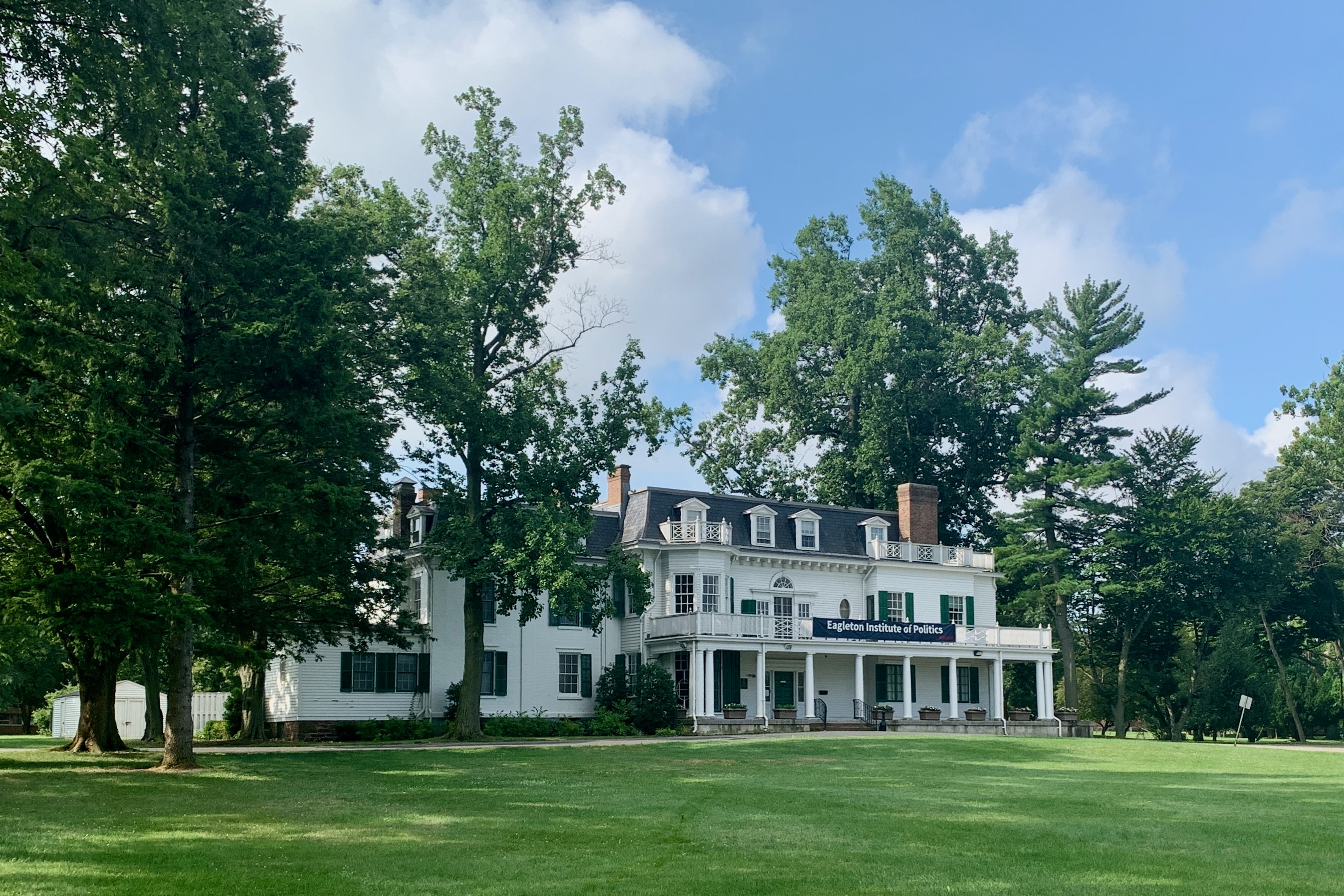
Facing the great lawn, with an Eagleton Institute of Politics banner

== See also ==
- National Register of Historic Places listings in Middlesex County, New Jersey
