= United States Conference of Mayors =

Organization of cities with populations of 30,000 or more

- Abbreviation: USCM
- Formation: 1932
- Type: Non-partisan
- Headquarters: 1620 I Street, N.W. Washington, D.C. 20006
- Region served: United States
- Members: 1,407 United States cities with populations of 30,000 or more
- President: Todd Gloria (D-San Diego, California)
- Website: Official website

The United States Conference of Mayors (USCM) is the official non-partisan organization of cities with populations of 30,000 or more. The cities are each represented by their mayors or other chief elected officials. The organization was founded in light of the Great Depression and was formed under Herbert Hoover until its original charter was signed at the Mayflower Hotel in Washington, D.C., on the eve of the inauguration of Franklin D. Roosevelt.

The organization is part of the "Big Seven", a group of organizations that represent local and state governments in the United States.

== Mission ==
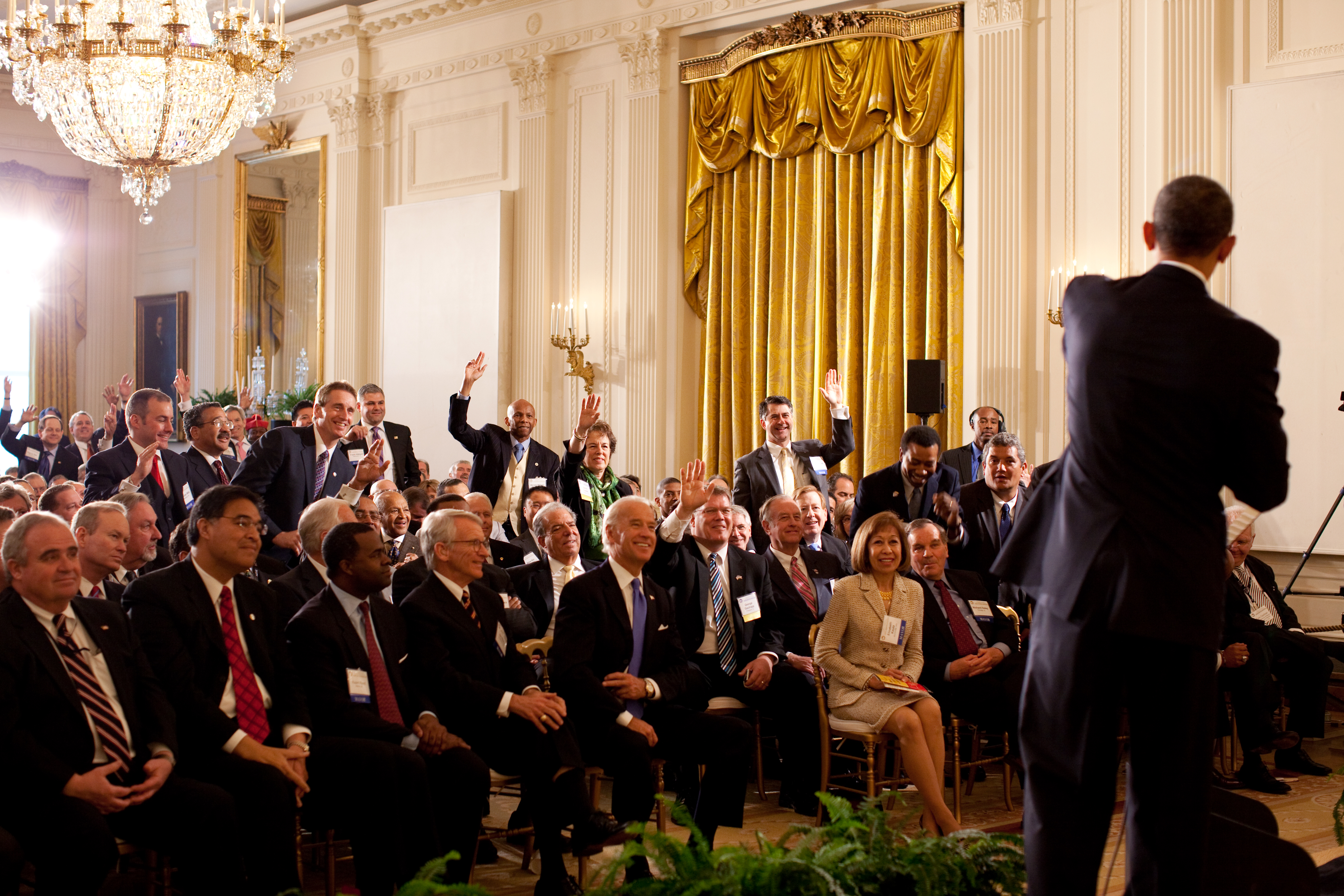
Barack Obama in a U.S. Conference of Mayors meeting in the East Room of the White House, January 21, 2010

The organization serves the following functions: Help develop and promote effective national urban/suburban policy; build stronger and more effective federal-city relationships; monitor the effectiveness of federal policy in terms of its service to urban needs; help mayors develop leadership and management tools; and to create a forum in which mayors can share ideas and information. By representing all large municipalities and their leaders in these ways, the conference is speaking for vast majority of the components of the nation's economy. According to one of the conference's own reports, metropolitan areas accounted for 84 percent of the nation's gross domestic product and at the same time generated 84 percent of the nation's employment opportunities.

== History ==
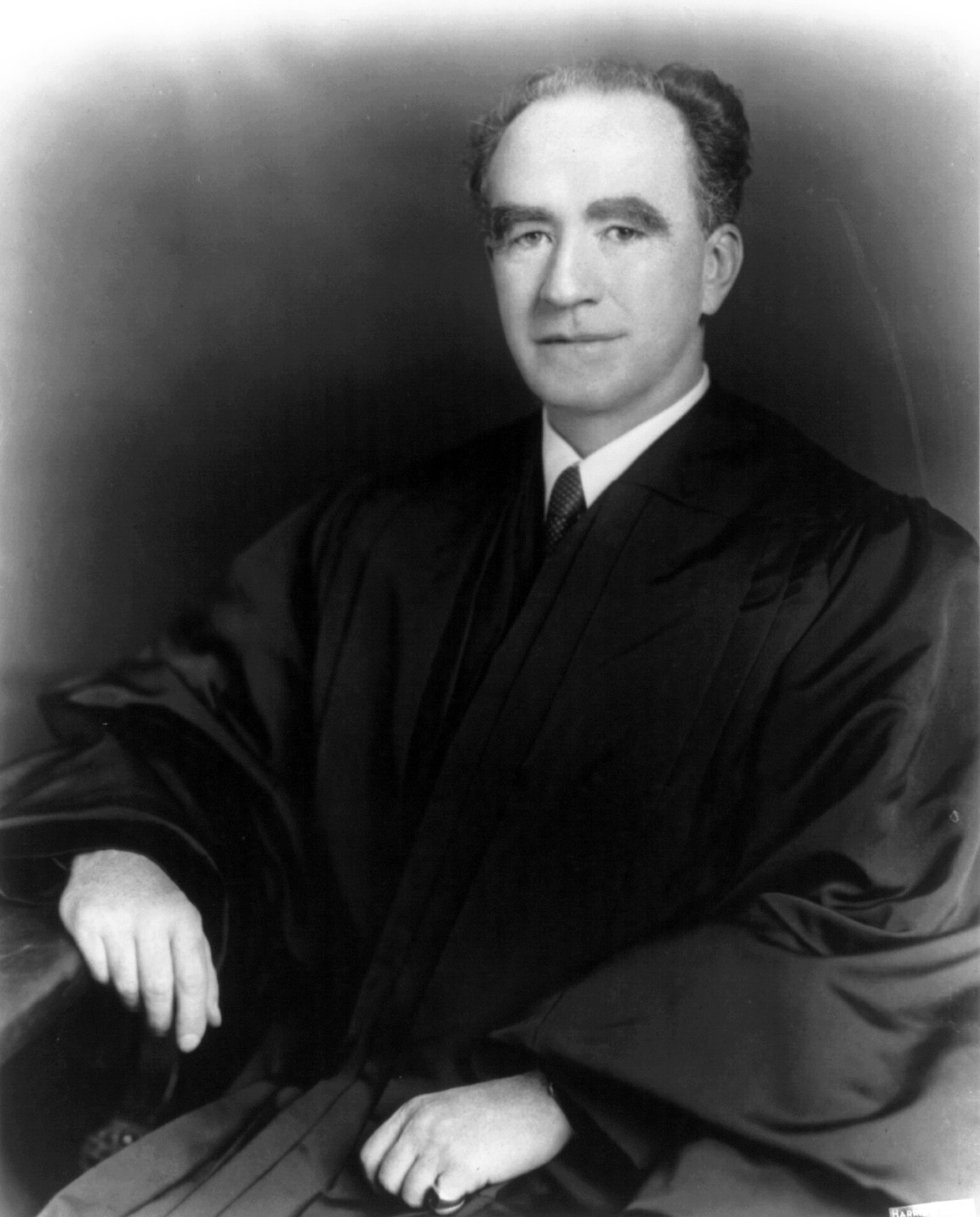
Frank Murphy, founder and first president of the USCM

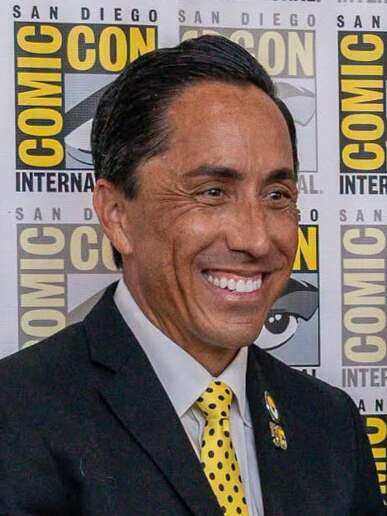
Current USCM President Todd Gloria

In 1932, Mayor of Detroit Frank Murphy called a conference of mayors to meet in Detroit, Michigan, in June. In the shadow of the depression, he felt it was worthwhile to pursue federal aid for cities. Forty-eight mayors of cities in excess of 100,000 attended. On June 3, two days after the Adjournment sine die of the first conference, Murphy appointed a seven-person commission (including himself) to lobby Washington using the powers vested in him by the conference. Murphy along with Mayor of Boston James Michael Curley, Mayor of Cleveland Ray T. Miller, Mayor of Milwaukee Daniel Hoan, Mayor of New Orleans T. Semmes Walmsley, Mayor of Minneapolis William A. Anderson, and Mayor of Grand Rapids George W. Welsh traveled to Washington, D.C., to lobby the federal government for aid. The mayors that went with him urgently pleaded for relief. On June 6 at 10:00 a.m., they met with United States Speaker of the House John Nance Garner (D), Majority Leader of the United States House of Representatives Henry T. Rainey (D) and Minority Leader of the United States House of Representatives Bertrand H. Snell (R). They held out hope for a $5 billion prosperity loan, but made it clear their true need for any relief for the despair of their constituents. At 11:00 a.m., they met with United States vice president/President of the United States Senate Charles Curtis and other Senate leaders. The presence of the Mayors was unprecedented and despite some Democratic defections, a band of 12 Republicans led by Fiorello LaGuardia enabled the passage of a relief bill by a 205–189 margin. Unfortunately for the mayors, President Herbert Hoover was not receptive to the $1.9 billion scale of the public works plan. However, the mayors were able to convince the President that federal support for local relief efforts was reasonable and this is considered a watershed event. 42 of the 48 states benefited from the newly empowered Reconstruction Finance Corporation. After the Emergency Relief and Construction Act of 1932 was signed into law by Hoover, the conference wrote its charter at the Mayflower Hotel on the eve of the inauguration of Franklin D. Roosevelt. It held its second meeting in 1933 and formed the permanent United States Conference of Mayors with Murphy as its president.

In 1972, USCM president and Mayor of Milwaukee Henry Maier led the crusade for municipal resources at a time when federal grants to state and local governments was escalating rapidly. Richard Nixon started allowing cities to participate in federal revenue sharing. This source of municipal funding relieved cities until the mid-1980s. Jimmy Carter capped revenue payments and Reagan discontinued everything except for CDBGs. The CDBG program has consistently allocated over $4 billion/year to state and local jurisdictions. Currently, CDBG's are being used by 1180 local governments and states. Using provisions in the 1995 Crime Bill, President Bill Clinton paid for municipal enforcement authorities on behalf of cities.

== Current issues ==
During the presidential transition of Barack Obama in December 2008, the conference held a news conference along with United States House Committee on Ways and Means chairman Charlie Rangel, United States House Transportation and Infrastructure Committee chairman James Oberstar and Congressional Urban Caucus chairman Chaka Fattah. Los Angeles mayor Antonio Villaraigosa announced that the meeting sought support of the conferences survey of 11,391 "ready-to-go" infrastructure projects that they hoped to see in a Main Street recovery plan during Obama's first 100 days. According to New York City mayor Michael Bloomberg, the $73.1 billion projects had completed the design and approval process and met all political requirement except for the need for funding. At the same time the American Association of State Highway and Transportation Officials called for support for more 5,148 road and bridge infrastructure projects that they categorized as "ready-to-go." Many of the ideas in the mayor proposal became part of the stimulus package.

Another issue that the conference took issue with in 2008 include the misappropriation of federal funds for municipal anti-terrorism emergency equipment through the Homeland Security Department, which was created in 2003, instead of for municipal police forces and other enforcement officials. On this issue, they stood by the International Association of Chiefs of Police who feel common domestic anti-crime expenditure might better serve the public interest. Since the September 11 attacks federally funded municipal purchases of bomb robots, chem-bio suits and other anti-terrorism equipment have often gone unused while crime is underserved. These organizations are calling for a re-evaluation of the federal grant system. Along with various foreign governments, United States Chamber of Commerce and the Travel Industry Association, the conference also stood against the 2008 Homeland Security Department initiative to fingerprint foreign visitors before they leave the country by airplane. These complaints came a few years after the conference complained that their cities were not receiving an equitable proportion of counterterrorism funding in the first few years after the attacks.

The conference has been active in fighting foreclosures and predatory lending. During the formulation and debate of the Emergency Economic Stabilization Act of 2008 in response to the 2008 financial crisis, a conference spokesperson was cited for being in support of the inclusion of $4 billion for the purchase, rehabilitation and resale of low- and moderate-income family distressed property. The money would produce profits that would be used to develop neighborhoods. Another important feature to municipalities was $180 million devoted to grants for pre-foreclosure and legal counseling.

Also in 2008, the conference unanimously both supported single-payer national health insurance and City-coordinated drug overdose prevention efforts. After calling for a study on bottled water in 2007, in 2008, the conference came out against bottled water which consumes 1.5 million barrels of oil per year to produce its plastic bottles.

In 2009, the conference adopted a sweeping proposal for lesbian and gay equality by mayors Christopher Cabaldon, Sam Adams, and David Cicilline, making it the first national organization of American elected officials to call for marriage equality, passage of ENDA, and the repeal of Don't ask, don't tell.

In 2013, the conference adopted a resolution urging the federal government to give states leeway in establishing marijuana policies. "Voters in states and cities that wish to break the stranglehold of organized crime over the distribution and sale of marijuana in their communities by legalizing, regulating and taxing marijuana should have the option of doing so," stated Mayor Stephen H. Cassidy of San Leandro, California.

In 2020, in part of the response to the COVID-19 pandemic, the conference requested $250 billion in federal spending directly to cities to counteract the 88% shortfall in city revenues across the country.

== Activities ==
The organization convenes for its winter meeting each January in Washington, D.C., and an Annual Meeting each June in a different U.S. city in addition to ad hoc meetings. At the annual meeting, members vote on policy resolutions. The results are distributed to the president of the United States and the United States Congress.

On January 11, 2007, the conference leadership approved the annual ten-point platform called "Strong Cities, Strong Families for a Strong America", including positions on energy policy and homeland security, and support for Community development block grants (CDBG), government sponsored enterprises, the State Children's Health Insurance Program (CHIPS), and the Workforce Investment Act. In 2008, travel and tourism were part of the plan for the first time.

In the past, the conference has taken stances against Ronald Reagan's 1983 budget. It has also through its president Fiorello La Guardia, spoken against cuts in the Works Progress Administration on behalf of Franklin D. Roosevelt. The conference has actively pursued legislation to curb handgun violence by changing the regulations for purchasing, adding regulatory oversight, and suing manufacturers for unreasonable marketing practices and lax safety standards.

At times, the unified voice of mayors has had significant impact on federal policies. An example was the controversy over the decision by investigators from the United States Department of Housing and Urban Development, Federal Bureau of Investigation and the United States Department of Justice to carry out an examination of waste, fraud and abuse in the housing programs in three cities led by black mayors (Kurt L. Schmoke, Marc H. Morial and Willie L. Brown Jr.). Eventually, the housing subcommittee of the United States House Committee on Appropriations Chairman, Jerry Lewis, in response into the collective voice of the mayors, with the support of President Bill Clinton and Andrew M. Cuomo, the United States secretary of housing and urban development, mandated a clarification of selection criteria for investigation subjects.

In determining their positions and policies, the conference has had to balance difficult political choices. They once opposed the Environmental Protection Agency in a resolution which came out against enforcing stricter smog and soot limits. The conference members felt that the stricter standards for ozone and fine particles would have hampered the economies of many municipalities, especially those that are steel-, automobile- and fossil fuel-intensive.

=== Locales of annual meetings ===
Year	City	State	Number
1963	Honolulu	Hawai'i	
1967	Honolulu	Hawai'i	
1972	New Orleans	Louisiana	40th
1980	Seattle	Washington	48th
1981	Louisville	Kentucky	49th
1982	Minneapolis	Minnesota	50th
1983	Denver	Colorado	51st
1984	Philadelphia	Pennsylvania	52nd
1985	Anchorage	Alaska	53rd
1986	San Juan	Puerto Rico	54th
1987	Nashville	Tennessee	55th
1988	Salt Lake City	Utah	56th
1989	Charleston	South Carolina	57th
1990	Chicago	Illinois	58th
1991	San Diego	California	59th
1992	Houston	Texas	60th
1993	New York	New York	61st
1994	Portland	Oregon	62nd
1995	Miami	Florida	63rd
1996	Cleveland	Ohio	64th
1997	San Francisco	California	65th
1998	Reno	Nevada	66th
1999	New Orleans	Louisiana	67th
2000	Seattle	Washington	68th
2001	Detroit	Michigan	69th
2002	Madison	Wisconsin	70th
2003	Denver	Colorado	71st
2004	Boston	Massachusetts	72nd
2005	Chicago	Illinois	73rd
2006	Las Vegas	Nevada	74th
2007	Los Angeles	California	75th
2008	Miami	Florida	76th
2009	Providence	Rhode Island	77th
2010	Oklahoma City	Oklahoma	78th
2011	Baltimore	Maryland	79th
2012	Orlando	Florida	80th
2013	Las Vegas	Nevada	81st
2014	Dallas	Texas	82nd
2015	San Francisco	California	83rd
2016	Indianapolis	Indiana	84th
2017	Miami Beach	Florida	85th
2018	Boston	Massachusetts	86th
2019	Honolulu	Hawaii	87th
2020	Virtual		88th
2021	Virtual		89th
2022	Reno	Nevada	90th
2023	Columbus	Ohio	91st
2024	Kansas City	Missouri	92nd
2025	Tampa	Florida	93rd
2026	Long Beach	California	94th
2027	Providence	Rhode Island	95th

== Annual awards and grants ==
The U.S. Conference of Mayors also houses the Mayors Climate Protection Center, created in 2007 to support mayors in their efforts to reduce the effects of climate change on American cities. In June 2007, the center awarded its first annual "Mayors' Climate Protection Awards" to leading mayors. The "U.S. Mayors Climate Protection Agreement", initiated by Seattle mayor Greg Nickels in 2005, seeks the pledges of mayors from all 50 states to take action to reduce greenhouse gas emissions by 7% from 1990 levels by the year 2012, in line with the Kyoto Protocol. As of February 2010, 1017 mayors have signed the Agreement. In 2007, the mayors called for a multibillion-dollar grant to help cities fight global warming and declared global warming as first on their list of top-ten priorities. That year the conference and the city of Seattle hosted the "2007 Mayors Climate Protection Summit in Seattle", which featured Bill Clinton and Al Gore. Wal-Mart has been a corporate partner in the presentation of the first two years of these awards.

The conference has granted City Livability Awards since 1979 for mayors and governments as recognition for developing programs that enhance the quality of life in urban areas. Programs such as drowning awareness and prevention programs earn such recognitions.

Since 1997, the Conference of Mayors in conjunction with the Americans for the Arts has annually presented Public Leadership in the Arts Awards. The awards recognize "elected officials and artists or arts organizations that have demonstrated outstanding leadership in the advancement of the arts." Various classes of elected officials are recognized and various types of contributions are recognized each year.

The conference has advocated for HIV/AIDS Prevention Grants Programs. Annually, in cooperation with the U.S. Centers for Disease Control and Prevention (CDC) it awards approximately hundreds of thousands of dollars in grants for HIV/AIDS prevention service to Native Americans as well as to African American or Hispanic Women at High Risk of HIV Infection. This was part of a broader 24-year partnership with the CDC in which the conference has awarded $23 million in grants to community-based organizations and local health departments to promote local prevention and education efforts.

== Organization ==
=== Task forces ===
Temporary task forces are organized to study emerging issues and make recommendations to the body of the conference. Prior task forces have addressed AIDS, hunger and homelessness, unfunded federal mandates, youth crime and violence, high fuel costs, and brownfields.

=== Standing committees ===
The organization's members serve on the conference's standing committee which recommend policies for the general body to evaluate for endorsement at the summer meetings. The endorsed policies are delivered to the United States president and United States Congress. The conference supports initiatives such as handgun regulation, recycling, defense funding and global warming. Although the organization is domestic, its reach is international. It partakes in missions to worldwide locations. When the internet blossomed and President Bill Clinton made plans for an unregulated and untaxed electronic marketplace, state and local officials objected. Their voice was represented by the conference. Mayors may also serve on one or more of the conference's standing committees: Children, Health, and Human Services; Community Development and Housing; Criminal and Social Justice; Energy; Environment; International Affairs; Jobs, Education and the Workforce; Metro Economies; Technology and Innovation; Tourism, Arts, Parks, Entertainment and Sports; and Transportation.

== Presidents ==
The president, vice president, and second vice president are chosen by a vote among delegates at the annual meeting. Mayors who wish to run for any of the positions must write a formal letter to the Nominating Committee, who will submit a report to be voted on at the annual meeting. Typically, at least one of the three mayors must be a member of the minority party.

=== List of presidents ===
The following is a comprehensive listing of presidents of the United States Conference of Mayors:

# (order)	Years	President	City	State	Party
1st	1932–33	Frank Murphy	Detroit	Michigan	Democratic
2nd	1933	James Michael Curley	Boston	Massachusetts	Democratic
3rd	1933–34	T. Semmes Walmsley	New Orleans	Louisiana	Democratic
4th	1934–35	Daniel Hoan	Milwaukee	Wisconsin	Socialist
5th	1935–45	Fiorello La Guardia	New York City	New York	Republican
6th	1945–47	Edward Joseph Kelly	Chicago	Illinois	Democratic
7th	1947–49	George W. Welsh	Grand Rapids	Michigan	Republican
8th	1949–50	Cooper Green	Birmingham	Alabama	Democratic
9th	1950–52	David L. Lawrence	Pittsburgh	Pennsylvania	Democratic
10th	1952–53	Martin H. Kennelly	Chicago	Illinois	Democratic
11th	1953	Thomas A. Burke	Cleveland	Ohio	Democratic
12th	1953–55	Elmer Robinson	San Francisco	California	Republican
13th	1955–57	John Hynes	Boston	Massachusetts	Democratic
14th	1957–58	Robert F. Wagner Jr.	New York City	New York	Democratic
15th	1958–59	Norris Poulson	Los Angeles	California	Republican
16th	1959–60	Richard J. Daley	Chicago	Illinois	Democratic
17th	1960–61	Richardson Dilworth	Philadelphia	Pennsylvania	Democratic
18th	1961–62	W. Haydon Burns	Jacksonville	Florida	Democratic
19th	1962	Anthony J. Celebrezze	Cleveland	Ohio	Democratic
20th	1962–63	Richard C. Lee	New Haven	Connecticut	Democratic
21st	1963	Arthur L. Selland	Fresno	California	Republican
22nd	1963–65	Raymond Tucker	St. Louis	Missouri	Democratic
23rd	1965–66	Neal Blaisdell	Honolulu	Hawaii	Republican
24th	1966–67	Jerome Cavanagh	Detroit	Michigan	Democratic
25th	1967–68	Joseph M. Barr	Pittsburgh	Pennsylvania	Democratic
26th	1968–69	Terry Schrunk	Portland	Oregon	Democratic
27th	1969–70	Jack D. Maltester	San Leandro	California	Democratic
28th	1970–71	James Tate	Philadelphia	Pennsylvania	Democratic
29th	1971–72	Henry Maier	Milwaukee	Wisconsin	Democratic
30th	1972–73	Louie Welch	Houston	Texas	Republican
31st	1973–74	Roy Martin	Norfolk	Virginia	Democratic
32nd	1974–75	Joseph Alioto	San Francisco	California	Democratic
33rd	1975–76	Moon Landrieu	New Orleans	Louisiana	Democratic
34th	1976–77	Kenneth A. Gibson	Newark	New Jersey	Democratic
35th	1977–78	Lee Alexander	Syracuse	New York	Democratic
36th	1978–79	William H. McNichols Jr.	Denver	Colorado	Democratic
37th	1979–80	Dick Carver	Peoria	Illinois	Republican
38th	1980–81	Richard G. Hatcher	Gary	Indiana	Democratic
39th	1981–82	Helen Boosalis	Lincoln	Nebraska	Democratic
40th	1982–83	Coleman Young	Detroit	Michigan	Democratic
41st	1983–84	Richard Fulton	Nashville	Tennessee	Democratic
42nd	1984–85	Hernán Padilla	San Juan	Puerto Rico	Republican
43rd	1985–86	Dutch Morial	New Orleans	Louisiana	Democratic
44th	1986–87	Joseph P. Riley Jr.	Charleston	South Carolina	Democratic
45th	1987–88	Richard L. Berkley	Kansas City	Missouri	Republican
46th	1988–89	Arthur John Holland	Trenton	New Jersey	Democratic
47th	1989–90	Kathy Whitmire	Houston	Texas	Democratic
48th	1990–91	Bob Isaac	Colorado Springs	Colorado	Republican
49th	1991–92	Raymond Flynn	Boston	Massachusetts	Democratic
50th	1992–93	William Althaus	York	Pennsylvania	Republican
51st	1993–94	Jerry Abramson	Louisville	Kentucky	Democratic
52nd	1994–95	Victor Ashe	Knoxville	Tennessee	Republican
53rd	1995–96	Norm Rice	Seattle	Washington	Democratic
54th	1996–97	Richard M. Daley	Chicago	Illinois	Democratic
55th	1997–98	Paul Helmke	Fort Wayne	Indiana	Republican
56th	1998–99	Deedee Corradini	Salt Lake City	Utah	Democratic
57th	1999–2000	Wellington Webb	Denver	Colorado	Democratic
58th	2000–01	H. Brent Coles	Boise	Idaho	Republican
59th	2001–02	Marc Morial	New Orleans	Louisiana	Democratic
60th	2002–03	Thomas Menino	Boston	Massachusetts	Democratic
61st	2003–04	James Garner	Hempstead	New York	Republican
62nd	2004–05	Don Plusquellic	Akron	Ohio	Democratic
63rd	2005–06	Beverly O'Neill	Long Beach	California	Democratic
64th	2006	Michael Guido	Dearborn	Michigan	Republican
65th	2006–08	Douglas Palmer	Trenton	New Jersey	Democratic
66th	2008–09	Manny Diaz	Miami	Florida	Democratic
67th	2009	Greg Nickels	Seattle	Washington	Democratic
68th	2009–11	Elizabeth Kautz	Burnsville	Minnesota	Republican
69th	2011–12	Antonio Villaraigosa	Los Angeles	California	Democratic
70th	2012–13	Michael Nutter	Philadelphia	Pennsylvania	Democratic
71st	2013–14	Scott Smith	Mesa	Arizona	Republican
72nd	2014–15	Kevin Johnson	Sacramento	California	Democratic
73rd	2015–16	Stephanie Rawlings-Blake	Baltimore	Maryland	Democratic
74th	2016–17	Mick Cornett	Oklahoma City	Oklahoma	Republican
75th	2017–18	Mitch Landrieu	New Orleans	Louisiana	Democratic
76th	2018–19	Stephen K. Benjamin	Columbia	South Carolina	Democratic
77th	2019–20	Bryan Barnett	Rochester Hills	Michigan	Republican
78th	2020–21	Greg Fischer	Louisville	Kentucky	Democratic
79th	2021–22	Nan Whaley	Dayton	Ohio	Democratic
80th	2022–23	Francis Suarez	Miami	Florida	Republican
81st	2023–24	Hillary Schieve	Reno	Nevada	Independent
82nd	2024–25	Andrew Ginther	Columbus	Ohio	Democratic
83rd	2025-26	David Holt	Oklahoma City	Oklahoma	Republican
84th	2026-present	Todd Gloria	San Diego	California	Democratic

=== Cities that have had multiple mayors serve as president ===
# of pres.	City	Mayors who served as president
5	New Orleans	T. Semmes Walmsley (1933–34); Moon Landrieu (1975–76); Dutch Morial (1985–86); Marc Morial (2001–02); Mitch Landrieu (2017–18)
4	Boston	James Michael Curley (1933); John Hynes (1955–57); Raymond Flynn (1991–92); Thomas Menino (2002–03)
4	Chicago	Edward Joseph Kelly (1945–47); Martin H. Kennelly (1952–53); Richard J. Daley (1959–60); Richard M. Daley (1996–97)
3	Detroit	Frank Murphy (1932–33); Jerome Cavanagh (1966–67); Coleman Young (1982–83)
3	Philadelphia	Richardson Dilworth (1960–61); James Tate (1970–71); Michael Nutter (2012–13)
2	Cleveland	Thomas A. Burke (1952); Anthony J. Celebrezze (1962)
2	Denver	William H. McNichols Jr. (1978–79); Wellington Webb (1999–2000)
2	Houston	Louie Welch (1972–73); Kathy Whitmire (1989–90)
2	Los Angeles	Norris Poulson (1958–59); Antonio Villaraigosa (2011–12)
2	Louisville	Jerry Abramson (1993–94); Greg Fischer (2020–21)
2	Miami	Manny Diaz (2008–09); Francis Suarez (2022–23)
2	Milwaukee	Daniel Hoan (1934–35); Henry Maier (1971–72)
2	New York City	Fiorello La Guardia (1935–45); Robert F. Wagner Jr. (1957–58)
2	Oklahoma City	Mick Cornett (2016–17); David Holt (2025–26)
2	Pittsburgh	David L. Lawrence (1950–52); Joseph M. Barr (1967–68)
2	San Francisco	Elmer Robinson (1953–55); Joseph Alioto (1974–75)
2	Seattle	Norm Rice (1995–96); Greg Nickels (2009)
2	Trenton	Arthur John Holland (1988–89); Douglas Palmer (2006–08)

== Controversies ==
The organization has had some controversies. In Newark, New Jersey, one of its non-partisan presidential straw polls was determined to be contrary to a New Jersey Supreme Court ruling because the court had determined that it was improper for any municipality to test public opinion on an area outside of its jurisdiction.

In 2002, protests by about 3,000 people against corporate financing of the U.S. Conference of Mayors were met by arrests and the barricading of much of downtown Madison, Wisconsin, by then mayor Sue Bauman.

Also, at the 2004 Democratic National Convention, striking Boston Police Department officers decided to picket a Conference of Mayors meeting. 2004 Democratic presidential nominee John Kerry, who was the invited speaker, decided to honor the picket line.

== See also ==
- National League of Cities
- Mayors Against Illegal Guns Coalition
- National Governors Association
- C40 Cities Climate Leadership Group
- United Cities and Local Governments
- Association internationale des maires francophones
- Global Parliament of Mayors
- List of mayors of the 50 largest cities in the United States
