= Richard Grant Augustus Donnelly =

American mayor (1841–1905)

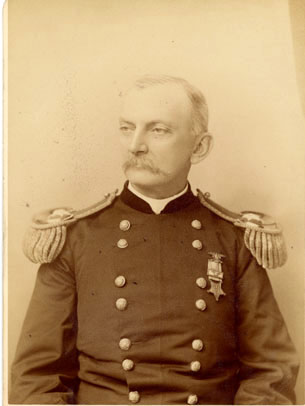
Richard Grant Augustus Donnelly (1841–1905) circa 1900

Richard Grant Augustus Donnelly (March 4, 1841 – February 27, 1905) was an American Democratic politician who served as Mayor of Trenton, New Jersey from 1884 to 1886. He also served as Quartermaster General of New Jersey circa 1903.

He served as Mayor of Trenton, New Jersey from 1884 to 1886. He was president of the Interstate Fair Association from 1895 to 1903. He was replaced by Frank Obadiah Briggs.
