= Carmen J. Armenti =

American politician

Carmen Armenti

44th Mayor of Trenton
- In office 1966–1970
- Preceded by: Arthur Holland
- Succeeded by: Arthur Holland
- In office Acting; November 1989 – June 1990
- Preceded by: Arthur Holland
- Succeeded by: Douglas Palmer

Personal details
- Born: April 11, 1929
- Died: April 14, 2001 (aged 72)
- Political party: Democratic (before 1972); Republican (1972–2001)

Carmen J. Armenti (1929–2001) was an American restaurateur and politician who served as the mayor of Trenton, New Jersey from 1966 to 1970 and 1989 to 1990. Following the death of his successor, Arthur Holland, Armenti served again as acting mayor until he was defeated for re-election in 1990 by challenger Douglas Palmer by a margin of under 300 votes.

== Early life ==
Carmen Armenti was born in 1929 to Carmen and Irmalinda Armenti, immigrants to Trenton from Italy.

He attended Junior High School No. 1 and Trenton Catholic High School. He received a one-year postgraduate athletic scholarship for basketball, baseball and football to The Pennington School.

After graduating, Armenti served as a United States Army private first class for 20 months; he was stationed in France as a hospital registrar. Then, he returned to Trenton to join the city's recreation department as sports supervisor.

== Political career ==
Armenti entered politics as a city councilman for the North Ward in 1962. His successor, W. Oliver “Bucky” Leggett, recalled Armenti as "the champion of the working class” at the time.

In 1966, Armenti was elected mayor over incumbent Arthur John Holland. During his tenure in office, Trenton was rocked by riots in the wake of the assassination of Martin Luther King Jr. that left one black youth shot dead by police. He was defeated by Holland in 1970.

Armenti returned to politics as a Republican in 1972 to run unsuccessfully for Mercer County Board of Chosen Freeholders. Nationally-syndicated columnist Joe Alsop cited Armenti's switch as symptomatic of a national shift among Catholic and ethnic white voters toward Richard Nixon and the Republican Party following the nomination of George McGovern.

In 1981, Armenti ran for the New Jersey State Senate to succeed Joseph Merlino, who retired to run for Governor of New Jersey. He was defeated by Gerald Stockman.

=== 1990 election ===
After Holland's death in 1989, Armenti became acting mayor. He ran in the election for a full term but was defeated by Mercer County Freeholder Douglas Palmer. Though he was by then a long-time Republican, the election was non-partisan and Armenti's campaign made no mention of his affiliation.

In the primary, Palmer narrowly led Armenti, 9,067 votes to 8,787. Armenti received as much as 75 percent of the vote in the city's Italian and Polish neighborhoods. The third-place finisher, police detective Pedro Medina received 3,537 votes and endorsed Armenti in the run-off. A fourth candidate, former lottery director Barbara Marrow-Mooring, received 461 votes.

During the run-off, Trenton native and Mayor of New York City David Dinkins campaigned for Palmer.

After his defeat, which largely broke down along racial lines, Armenti walked mayor-elect Palmer through the streets of Chambersburg in a gesture of goodwill and unity. Palmer later called Armenti's act "heroic" and said, "The city was certainly at a crossroads, and I think what Carmen did in the ‘Burg helped our city in its effort to move forward."

== Personal life ==
Armenti married Hope Vulgaris in 1968, during his run for mayor. They had two children, Melinda and Carmen.

After he left office in 1970, Carmen and Hope Armenti opened two restaurants, both named Carmen Armenti's.

== Death ==
Armenti died on April 14, 2001 "after a long battle with cancer." He was remembered by Douglas Palmer as "a friend, role model, mentor and a person who truly loved Trenton.” Palmer ordered flags flown at half mast at all city buildings.
