= Richard L. Berkley =

American politician (1931–2023)

Richard L Berkley
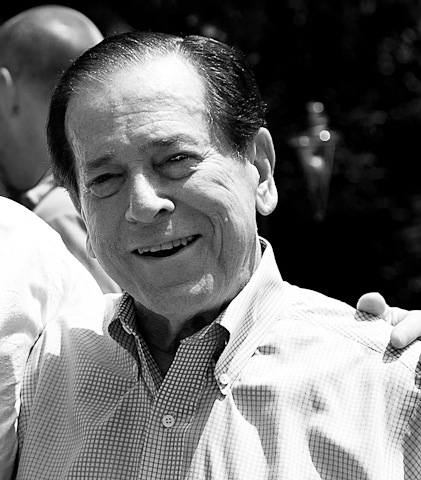
- Berkley in 2011

50th Mayor of Kansas City
- In office May 1979 – May 1991
- Preceded by: Charles Wheeler
- Succeeded by: Emanuel Cleaver

45th President of the United States Conference of Mayors
- In office 1987–1988
- Preceded by: Joseph Riley Jr.
- Succeeded by: Arthur Holland

Personal details
- Born: Richard L. Berkowitz; June 29, 1931 Kansas City, Missouri, U.S.
- Died: November 29, 2023 (aged 92)
- Party: Republican
- Spouse: Sandy Berkley
- Children: 2
- Education: Harvard University (AB, MBA)

Richard L. Berkley (born Richard L. Berkowitz; June 29, 1931 – November 29, 2023) was an American politician who was the 50th mayor of Kansas City, Missouri, from 1979 to 1991.

== Life and career ==
Born Richard Berkowitz in 1931, he received his undergraduate degree from Harvard University and a Master of Business Administration from Harvard Business School in 1957. His family owns the Kansas City‐based Tension Corporation (before 2011 Tension Envelope Corporation), and Berkley was treasurer and was on the company's board of directors.

Berkley served on the city council from 1969 to 1979 and was mayor pro tem from 1971 to 1979. Although Kansas City mayors do not officially have political affiliations, Berkley has been the only Republican mayor of the city since Albert I. Beach left office in 1930. He was the city's first Jewish mayor.

During his term as mayor, he led the calls for a federal investigation into the Hyatt Regency walkway collapse in 1981. More than 700 capital improvement projects occurred during his term, including a major expansion of Bartle Hall Convention Center and revitalization of the Quality Hill neighbourhood.

The Richard L. Berkley Riverfront Park is named for him near the intersections of Riverfront Drive, Berkley Plaza, and Lydia Avenue with Berkley Parkway along the Missouri River just off I-35 and the Christopher "Kit" Bond Bridge (I-35). The Port Authority of Kansas City, Missouri (Port KC) established a public cemetery within the Park for his internment. Mayor Berkley was on the City Council when the Port Authority was formed in 1977 and continued to be a great political and civic advocate for the clean up and eventual redevelopment of the Riverfront Development adjacent to Berkley Riverfront Park which was built in 1999. Today Port KC's development includes more than 1 million square feet of development include luxury apartments, retail, a boutique hotel, and will also be home to first worldwide stadium purpose-built for a women's professional sports team. The 11,500 seat $125 million stadium is expected to open March 2024 will be home to KC Current.

Berkley and his wife, Sandy, had two children Elizabeth and Jon. His granddaughter is Las Vegas based model McKenna Berkley, who appeared in the 2017 Sports Illustrated Swimsuit Issue in body paint. He died on November 29, 2023, at the age of 92.

Political offices
| Preceded by Charles Wheeler | Mayors of Kansas City, Missouri; 1979–1991 | Succeeded by Emanuel Cleaver |
