= Ruth Mandel =

American political scientist (1938–2020)

- Born: Ruth Blumenstock; August 29, 1938; Vienna, Austria
- Died: April 11, 2020 (aged 81); Princeton, New Jersey, U.S.
- Education: Brooklyn College (BA); University of Connecticut (PhD)
- Children: Maud Mandel
- Scientific career
- Fields: Political science
- Institutions: Eagleton Institute of Politics; Rutgers University

Ruth Mandel (née Blumenstock; August 29, 1938 – April 11, 2020), usually published as Ruth B. Mandel, was an American political scientist and author who wrote about women in politics. She was the director of the Eagleton Institute of Politics at Rutgers University for more than 20 years, where she was also a professor of politics. Before that she spent more than 20 years as the director of the Eagleton Institute's Center for American Women and Politics. Mandel was also an official at the United States Holocaust Memorial Museum. Her daughter Maud Mandel is the 18th president of Williams College.

== Early life and education ==
Mandel was born in Vienna on August 29, 1938 to Mechel and Lea (née Schmelzer) Blumenstock. Mandel and her family, who were Jewish, attempted to flee Austria and Germany shortly before the Holocaust as refugees on the MS St. Louis. After the passengers were not permitted to disembark in Cuba, the United States, or Canada, the ship returned to Europe, where Mandel's family was able to escape to England. They resided there for 9 years, and then joined family in Brooklyn.

In 1960, Mandel graduated from Brooklyn College with a degree in English literature. She then attended the University of Connecticut, where she earned a Ph.D. in 1969.

== Career ==
After obtaining her PhD, Mandel began teaching English at Rutgers University. When the Eagleton Institute of Politics started a Center for American Women and Politics 1971, Mandel volunteered as a co-founding member of the center, and she was quickly promoted to the position of co-director and then director of the center, a position which she held from 1973 to 1994. In 1995 she became the director of the Eagleton Institute of Politics, which she remained until she stepped down in 2019.

As the director of the Center for American Women and Politics for more than 20 years, and then of the entire Eagleton Institute for another 24 years, Mandel has been credited with building substantial parts of the Eagleton Center as well as promoting the role of women in American politics more broadly. Debbie Walsh, a subsequent director of the Center for American Women and Politics, cited the moment that Mandel became director of the Center as "the moment when Second Wave feminism met electoral politics".

Mandel's research also largely focused on women in American electoral politics. In 1981 her book In the Running: The New Woman Candidate was published. In the early 1970s, less than 5% of all elected officials in the United States were women, but by 1980 the number had grown to 10%. Mandel used both candidate interviews and observational research methods to document the experiences of women candidates as the proportion of elected officials who were women more than doubled. Obituaries for Mandel credited In the running with being "the first book-length account of women's experiences as candidates for political office".

In 1991, Mandel was appointed to the governing board of the United States Holocaust Memorial Museum. In 1993, she was named Vice Chair of the U.S. Holocaust Memorial Council, a position that was appointed by the President of the United States. She remained in that position until 2006.

Mandel's work was cited, or she was interviewed, on topics relating to women and politics in news outlets like The Washington Post, Bloomberg News, The Atlantic, and Politico. Mandel was awarded both an honorary Doctor of Public Service from Chatham College and an honorary Doctor of Public Administration from Georgian Court University.
