= Christophe Eagleton =

American composer and sound designer

- Born: February 16, 1978 (age 48); London, England
- Occupations: Composer; sound designer
- Years active: 2003–present

Christophe Eagleton (born 16 February 1978) is an American composer and sound designer. He is the founder of the media company Dynamite Laser Beam, which has worked with companies such as Disney, T-Mobile, MTV, Coca-Cola, Universal Pictures and Electronic Arts.

== Life and career ==
Eagleton was born in London, England. In 2006, he founded the company Dynamite Laser Beam, which specializes in custom scoring, music production, music library search and sound design. In 2015, Dynamite Laser Beam was commissioned to create music for the Pepsi Art Dome at Voodoo Fest. Eagleton also created music and sound design for the Electronic Arts Play Experience at E3 in 2016 and 2017.

== Discography ==
- Astra Moveo (2009)
