= Christopher Molloy =

American scientist and pharmacist (born 1954)

Christopher J. Molloy, PhD, RPh (born February 18, 1954) is an American scientist and pharmacist. As of July 1, 2021, Molloy assumed the position of university professor/chancellor emeritus at Rutgers University. He previously served as the chancellor for Rutgers University–New Brunswick Campus (2018–2021). He is an Elected Fellow of the American Association for the Advancement of Science.

Molloy joined Rutgers in 2007 as dean of the Ernest Mario School of Pharmacy. In 2011, he was appointed interim provost for biomedical and health sciences and successfully managed the complex integration of Rutgers and most of the former University of Medicine and Dentistry of New Jersey (UMDNJ). He served as interim chancellor of Rutgers Biomedical and Health Sciences in 2013 and Senior Vice President for Research and Economic Development from 2013 to 2018.

He received his bachelor's degree in pharmacy from Rutgers and his doctoral degree (pharmacology and toxicology) from the Rutgers Graduate School of Biomedical Sciences–New Brunswick. He was a post-doctoral fellow at the National Cancer Institute.

Prior to joining Rutgers, Molloy held senior research and management positions at Johnson & Johnson Pharmaceutical Research and Development L.L.C., 3-Dimensional Pharmaceuticals Inc., and the Bristol-Myers Squibb Pharmaceutical Research Institute.
