= Tony F. Mack =

American politician (born 1966)

Tony F. Mack, Sr.

46th Mayor of Trenton, New Jersey
- In office July 1, 2010 – February 7, 2014 (Note: Mack was convicted of a felony on February 7, per state law he was to be removed from office on the date of conviction. He was not ousted until February 26, 2014.)
- Preceded by: Douglas Palmer
- Succeeded by: George Muschal (acting)

Personal details
- Born: January 8, 1966 (age 60) Louisville, Georgia, U.S.
- Party: Democratic
- Spouse: Kara
- Children: Tony Mack Jr, Carrington, Madison and Kennedy
- Education: Howard University; Fairleigh Dickinson University
- Profession: public official

Tony F. Mack, Sr. (born January 8, 1966) is an American Democratic politician from Trenton, New Jersey. He served as the Mayor of Trenton from 2010 until February 2014, when he was forced to resign after his conviction on federal bribery, fraud, extortion, and money laundering charges.

His administration was "plagued by accusations of cronyism and reckless spending," according to The New York Times. He faced a recall election in November 2011; however, it did not gain sufficient citizen support to succeed. On September 10, 2012, Mack was arrested after being the subject of an FBI investigation into bribery, fraud, extortion and money laundering. His trial began on January 6, 2014, and on February 7, 2014 he was convicted on all counts. On February 26, 2014, New Jersey Superior Court Judge Mary Jacobson removed Mayor Mack from office.

== Early life and education ==
Mack was born in Louisville, Georgia. When he was five years old, his father died, and the family moved to Trenton, New Jersey. Mack grew up in the Wilbur section of the city and attended the Trenton Public Schools.

He earned a bachelor's degree in Consumer Affairs Management from Howard University in Washington, D.C., where he was also a member of the football, wrestling and baseball teams from 1984 to 1988. He was a member of the 1987 football team, coached by College Football Hall of Fame member Willie Jeffries, that won the Mid-Eastern Athletic Conference title and finished 9–1. Mack excelled in all three sports, most prominently in wrestling, where his coach was Paul A. Cotton, Ph.D., R.D. As a freshman, he placed second in the MEAC tournament, where he was voted outstanding wrestler, and he also advanced to the Championship Finals of the Capital Collegiate Tournament. In 1986 and 1987, Mack won MEAC Championships in the 150 pound class; in 1987 he became the first Howard wrestler to compete in the NCAA tournament. In 2007, he was inducted into the Howard Athletic Hall of Fame.

Mack earned a Master's degree in Administrative Science at Fairleigh Dickinson University.

== Early political career ==
=== Mercer County Freeholder ===
Mack served as a Mercer County Freeholder for 12 years.

First elected in 1996, he served on a variety of committees, including the Airport Advisory Council, the Board of School Estimate, the Commission on Child Abuse and Missing Children, the Human Services Advisory Council, and the Organization Rules and Procedures Committee.

Upon being re-elected to a second freeholder term on November 2, 1999, he was sworn in as the Freeholder Board President in 2000. He was re-elected in 2002 and 2005 but was defeated in the Democratic primary election held in June 2008 by John Cimino.

Mack also served the Democratic Party as a committeeman in the East Ward (District 7) and West Ward (District 1) sections of Trenton.

== Mayor of Trenton ==
He was elected Mayor of Trenton, New Jersey in 2010, defeating Manny Segura.

Among Mack's first moves as mayor of the city of 85,000 was firing the existing department heads, including a deputy city clerk hired by the City Council but escorted from City Hall by police.

As mayor, Mack was a member of the Mayors Against Illegal Guns coalition.

=== Unsuccessful recall ===
Mack faced a recall election after a controversial first year in office: "Mack's critics say he has used the city's payroll like a personal piggy bank, hiring unqualified friends for key posts and focusing on minor projects like parks and parades as the city struggles with serious problems," according to The Times. This first year of his administration also saw an unusually-large procession of business administrators. The first resigned after a month, saying the mayor didn't believe in "good government." Another resigned just ahead of pleading guilty to embezzlement while employed in another, previous position.

His housing director quit after a prior theft conviction was revealed. His chief of staff was arrested trying to buy heroin. His half-brother, whose authority he elevated at the city water plant, was arrested on charges of stealing. Subsequently, his law director resigned after arguing with Mack over complying with open-records laws and potential violations of laws prohibiting the awarding of city contracts to large campaign donors.

=== Conviction and resignation ===
As part of an FBI investigation, his home was raided on July 18, 2012, and some offices at city hall were raided on the following day.

Mack was arrested on September 10, 2012 along with eight others including his brother and his close associate, steakhouse owner Joseph A. "JoJo" Giorgianni.

Mack was found guilty by a jury of all counts on February 7, 2014. He was sentenced to nearly five years in federal prison.

=== Release ===
On May 23, 2018, Mack was released from prison.

== Electoral history ==
2010 Mayor of Trenton, New Jersey election runoff
Candidate	Votes	%
Tony Mack	7,257	62.25%
Manuel Segura	4,375	37.75%
Majority	2,882	24.5%

== Personal life ==
He is a member of the National Association for the Advancement of Colored People, The Urban League Guild; a former member of Laborers' International Union of North America Local 595 and a former president of American Federation of State, County and Municipal Employees Local 2281.
