= Douglas Palmer =

Mayor of Trenton, New Jersey

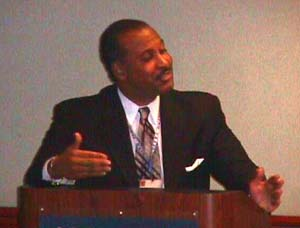
- Palmer in 1998

45th Mayor of Trenton, New Jersey
- In office July 1, 1990 – June 30, 2010
- Preceded by: Carmen J. Armenti
- Succeeded by: Tony F. Mack

65th President of the United States Conference of Mayors
- In office 2006–2008
- Preceded by: Michael Guido
- Succeeded by: Manny Diaz

Personal details
- Born: Douglas Harold Palmer; October 19, 1951 (age 74) Trenton, New Jersey, U.S.
- Party: Democratic
- Spouse: Christiana Foglio-Palmer
- Children: Laila Rose (born 2002)
- Education: Hampton University

Douglas Harold Palmer (born October 19, 1951) is a former politician who was the first African-American mayor of Trenton, New Jersey.

== Biography ==
Palmer was born in Trenton and attended Trenton public schools. He then graduated from the Bordentown Military Institute in Bordentown, New Jersey. He is a graduate of Virginia's private historically black college Hampton University, where he received a Bachelor of Science degree in Business Management in 1973. Palmer is also a member of Groove Phi Groove fellowship. He took office as mayor of Trenton on July 1, 1990, having defeated former city council president and mayor Carmen Armenti.

Palmer helped to initiate the Trenton Office of Policy Studies, now the John S. Watson Institute for Public Policy, at Thomas Edison State University, a think tank under the executive directorship of John P. Thurber, representing a partnership among the Mayor's Office, the University, and foundations to provide high quality, focused research to the administration of a small city.

Palmer assembled a cabinet, including William Bill Watson as Chief of Staff, Alan Mallach as Director of Housing and Urban Development, and Elizabeth Johnson as Director of Recreation, Natural Resources, and Culture.

Palmer was a member of the Mayors Against Illegal Guns Coalition, a bipartisan group with a stated goal of "making the public safer by getting illegal guns off the streets." The Coalition is co-chaired by Boston Mayor Thomas Menino and New York City Mayor Michael Bloomberg.

Palmer announced at a press conference December 7, 2009, that he would not seek a sixth term as mayor of Trenton.

In 2023, he was inducted into Hampton University's athletics hall of fame. He had played for both the Pirates football and Pirates baseball teams.

== See also ==
- List of first African-American mayors
