= Florence Peshine Eagleton =

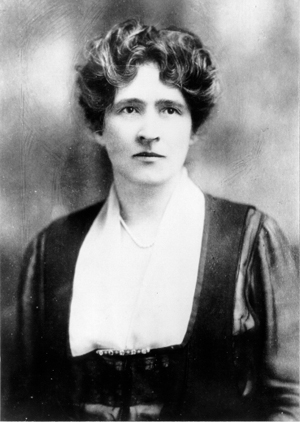
- Eagleton circa 1900-1920
- Born: Florence Peshine; April 16, 1870; Newark, New Jersey
- Died: November 22, 1953 (aged 83); Newark, New Jersey
- Occupation: Philanthropist
- Spouse: Wells Phillips Eagleton
- Parent(s): Francis Stratford Peshine; Elizabeth Mary Jellip

Florence Peshine Eagleton (April 16, 1870 – November 22, 1953) was a leader in the woman suffrage movement and advocated women's higher education. She was one of the first women to serve as a Trustee of Rutgers University. She willed more than $1,000,000 to establish the Wells Phillips Eagleton and Florence Peshine Eagleton Foundation, now the Eagleton Institute of Politics at Rutgers University.

== Biography ==
She was born in Newark, New Jersey to Elizabeth Mary Jellip and Francis Stratford Peshine. Francis was a shoe dealer. They were reasonably affluent as is borne out by the fact that in 1880 they had three live-in servants. She married a man twice her age, and that marriage ended in divorce. In 1913 she married Wells Phillips Eagleton (1865-1946), a neurosurgeon. She was a trustee of the Newark Museum, a vice president of the Travelers Aid Society, and a life member of the New Jersey Historical Society. She died on November 22, 1953.
