= List of mayors of Trenton, New Jersey =

== Background ==
In 1837, following the absorption of Trenton Township, the population of Trenton was too large for government by city council. A new mayoral government was adopted, with by-laws that remain in operation to this day.

Today, Trenton is governed under the Faulkner Act of 1950 within the mayor-council system of municipal government. The governing body is comprised of a mayor and a seven-member city council. Three city council members are elected at-large, and four come from each of four wards. The mayor and the at-large council members are elected concurrently on a non-partisan basis to four-year terms of office as part of the November general election.

== List of mayors ==
#	Image	Mayor	Term in office	Length of service	Party affiliation	Previous office
1		Moore Furman (1728–1808)	1792 – 1794	2 years	[data missing]	Deputy Quartermaster-General and Forage Master of New Jersey
2		Aaron Woodruff (1762–1817; aged 54)	1794 – 1797	3 years	Federalist	Member of the General Assembly
3		James Ewing (1744–1823)	1797 – 1803	6 years	[data missing]	New Jersey Assemblyman
4		Joshua Wright	1803 – 1806	3 years	[data missing]	[data missing]
5		Stacy Potts	1806 – 1814	8 years	[data missing]	[data missing]
6		Robert McNealy	1814 – 1832	18 years	[data missing]	[data missing]
7		Charles Burroughs	1832 – 1847	15 years	[data missing]	[data missing]
8		Samuel R. Hamilton	1847 – 1849	2 years	[data missing]	[data missing]
9		William C. Howell	1849 – 1850	1 year	[data missing]	[data missing]
10		William Napton	1850 – 1852	2 years	[data missing]	New Jersey Assemblyman
11		John R. Tucker	1852 – 1854	2 years	[data missing]	[data missing]
(10)		William Napton	1854 – 1855	1 year	[data missing]	Former Mayor of Trenton
12		William P. Sherman	1855 – 1855	under 1 year	[data missing]	[data missing]
(11)		John R. Tucker	1855 – 1856	1 year	[data missing]	Former Mayor of Trenton
13		Joseph Wood	1856 – 1859	3 years	Democratic	[data missing]
14		Franklin S. Mills	1859 – 1861	2 years	[data missing]	New Jersey Assemblyman
15		William R. McKean	1861 – 1863	2 years	[data missing]	[data missing]
(14)		Franklin S. Mills	1863 – 1867	4 years	[data missing]	Former Mayor of Trenton
16		Alfred Reed (1839–1918)	1867 – 1868	1 year	[data missing]	President of the City Council
(10)		William Napton	1868 – 1871	3 years	Republican	Former Mayor of Trenton
17		John Briest (1836–1915)	1871 – 1875	4 years	Democratic	Publisher of The Emporium
18		Wesley Creveling (1841–1920)	1875 – 1877	2 years	Democratic	[data missing]
19		Daniel R. Bodine	1877 – 1879	2 years	[data missing]	[data missing]
20		William Rice	1879 – 1881	2 years	[data missing]	[data missing]
21		Garrett D. W. Vroom (b. 1843)	1881 – 1884	3 years	Democratic	[data missing]
22		Richard Grant Augustus Donnelly (1841–1905; aged 63)	1884 – 1886	2 years	Democratic	New Jersey Assemblyman
23		John Woolverton	1886 – 1887	1 year	Democratic	Former New Jersey Senator
24		Frank A. Magowan	April 17, 1887 – 1889	2 years	Republican	Rubber manufacturer
25		Anthony A. Skirm	1889 – 1891	2 years	[data missing]	[data missing]
26		Daniel J. Bechtel	1891 – 1893	2 years	Democratic	[data missing]
27		Joseph B. Shaw (1857/58–1936; aged 61)	1893 – 1895	2 years	[data missing]	[data missing]
28		Emory Neal Yard	1895 – 1897	2 years	[data missing]	[data missing]
29		Welling G. Sickel (1858–1911; aged 52)	1897 – 1899	2 years	Republican	Vice President of United Globe Rubber Co.
30		Frank O. Briggs (1851–1913; aged 61)	1899 – 1902(lost re-election)	3 years	Republican	Member of the Trenton School Board
31		Frank S. Katzenbach (1868–1929; aged 60)	1902 – 1906	4 years	Democratic	Alderman At-large
32		Frederick W. Gnichtel (b. 1860)	1906 – 1908	2 years	Republican	City Councilman
33		Walter Madden (b. 1873)	1908 – 1911	3 years	Democratic	[data missing]
In 1911, Trenton adopted the commission form of government. The mayor was elected by the commissioners and typically the most popular member at the previous election.
34		Frederick W. Donnelly (1866–1935; aged 68)	1911 – November 1, 1932(resigned)	21 years	Democratic	Businessman, president of the Trenton Harbor Board, and son of former mayor R.G.A. Donnelly
35		Edward W. Lee (1876/77–1942; aged 65)	November 1, 1932 – November 18, 1932	18 days	[data missing]	Member of the Trenton City Commission
36		George B. LaBarre	November 18, 1932 – 1934	2 years	[data missing]	Member of the Trenton City Commission
In 1935, Trenton adopted the council-manager form of government.
37		William J. Connor	May 14, 1935 – 1939	4 years	[data missing]	[data missing]
In 1939, Trenton reverted to the commission form of government.
38		Leo Rogers (1896/97–1941; aged 44)	May 23, 1939 – March 7, 1941(died in office)	2 years	Democratic	Assistant Mercer County Prosecutor and candidate for New Jersey Senate (1937)
39		Ward Lee	1941 – 1941	under 1 year	[data missing]	[data missing]
40		John Anthony Hartmann I	1941 – 1943	2 years	[data missing]	Member of the Trenton City Commission
41		Andrew Duch	May 1943 – May 19, 1947	4 years	[data missing]	Mercer County Prosecutor, Director of Public Safety
42		Donal J. Connolly (1909–1995; aged 86)	May 20, 1947 – 1959	12 years	Democratic	State Assemblyman
43		Arthur J. Holland (1918–1989; aged 71)	1959 – 1966	6 years	Democratic	City Councilman
44		Carmen J. Armenti (1929–2001; aged 72)	1966 – 1970	4 years	Democratic	City Councilman, North Ward
(43)		Arthur J. Holland (1918–1989; aged 71)	1970 – November 9, 1989(died in office)	19 years	Democratic	Former Mayor of Trenton
(44)		Carmen J. Armenti (1929–2001; aged 72)	November 9, 1989 – July 1, 1990	234 days	Republican	City Council President
45		Douglas Palmer (Note: Palmer was the first African-American mayor in the city's history.) (born in 1951; aged 75)	July 1, 1990 – July 1, 2010	20 years	Democratic	Mercer County Freeholder
46		Tony F. Mack (born in 1966; aged 60)	July 1, 2010 – February 26, 2014(removed from office)	3 years, 67 days	Democratic	Mercer County Freeholder
47		George Muschal	February 26, 2014 – July 1, 2014	125 days	Unaffiliated	City Councilman, South Ward
48		Eric Jackson (born in 1959; aged 66–67)	July 1, 2014 – July 1, 2018	4 years	Democratic	Trenton Director of Public Works
49		W. Reed Gusciora (born in 1960; aged 66)	July 1, 2018 (incumbent)	8 years	Democratic	New Jersey Assemblyman
