= Arthur John Holland =

American politician

Arthur Holland
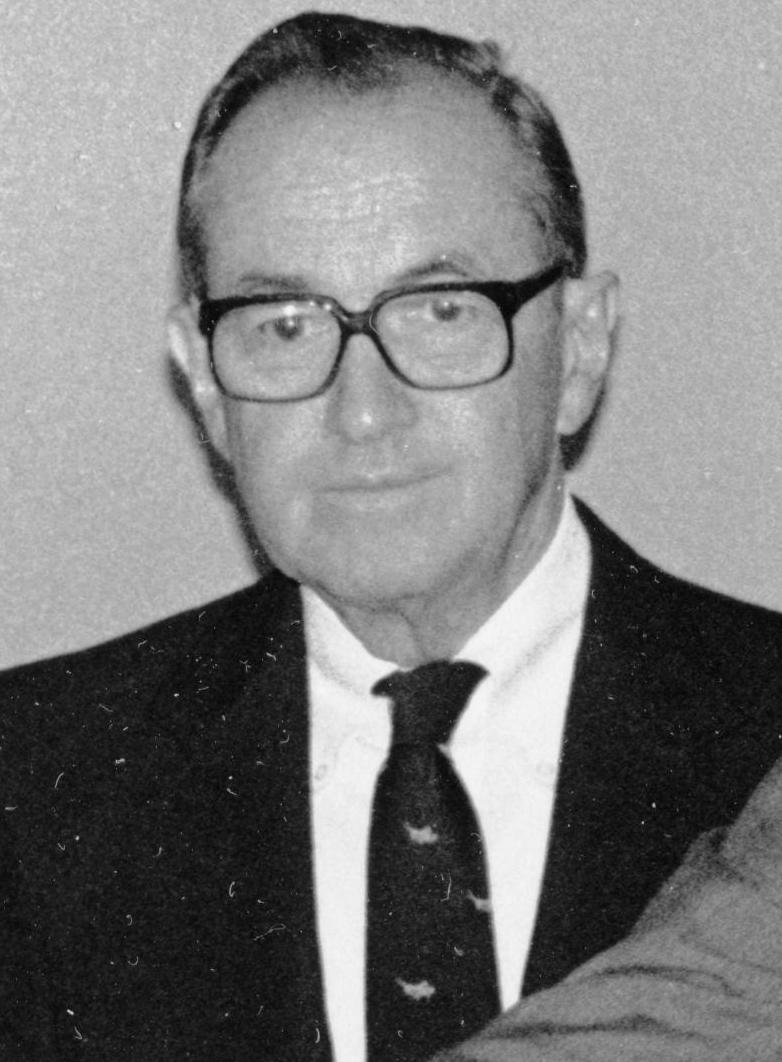
- Holland in the 1980s

43rd Mayor of Trenton, New Jersey
- In office 1959–1966
- Preceded by: Donal J. Connolly
- Succeeded by: Carmen J. Armenti
- In office 1970 – November 9, 1989
- Preceded by: Carmen Armenti
- Succeeded by: Carmen Armenti (acting)

46th President of the United States Conference of Mayors
- In office 1988–1989
- Preceded by: Richard Berkley
- Succeeded by: Kathy Whitmire

Trenton City Councilman
- In office 1956–1959

Personal details
- Born: October 24, 1918; Trenton, New Jersey, U.S.
- Died: November 9, 1989 (aged 71); Trenton, New Jersey, U.S.
- Political party: Democratic

Arthur John Holland (October 24, 1918 – November 9, 1989) was Mayor of Trenton, New Jersey for 26 years and president of the United States Conference of Mayors.

== Biography ==
He was born in Trenton, New Jersey on October 24, 1918.

He was raised Roman Catholic and considered becoming a priest early in life. Although he studied for the priesthood, he opted against this path and instead attended Saint Francis College and, after graduation, earned an advanced degree from Rutgers University.

In 1951 Holland became deputy director of public affairs for Trenton, and in 1955 he was elected as a Democrat to Trenton's City Council. He became Mayor of Trenton, New Jersey in 1959, and soon after married his wife Betty. In 1964 he publicly moved into the Mill Hill neighborhood of Trenton, a majority black neighborhood, attempting to lead the way in his city's racial integration. Holland received national attention for the move, much of it negative, but the area thereafter became less racially segregated.

In 1966, Holland lost the Democratic Primary to Carmen J. Armenti, and served as a teacher at Rutgers University for four years. In 1970 he ran for mayor again, and was reelected. He was president of the United States Conference of Mayors from 1988 to 1989, and remained mayor of Trenton until he died.

In 1975, Holland ran for the newly created office of Mercer County Executive. He lost the Democratic primary to Arthur Sypek.

He died of cancer at St. Francis Medical Center (Trenton, New Jersey) on November 9, 1989.
