= 1987 New Jersey General Assembly election =

- November 5, 1987

All 80 seats in the New Jersey General Assembly 41 seats needed for a majority
- Turnout: 47% (▼5pp)
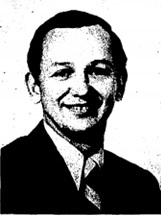

	Majority party	Minority party
Leader	Chuck Hardwick
Party	Republican	Democratic
Leader since	January 3, 1985
Leader's seat	21st (Westfield)
Last election	50	30
Seats won	42	38
Seat change	▼8	▲8
- Results: Democratic gain Republican hold Democratic hold
Speaker before election
Chuck Hardwick
Republican
Elected Speaker
Chuck Hardwick
Republican

The 1987 New Jersey General Assembly election was held on November 5, 1987.

The elections took place midway through Governor Tom Kean's second term in office. Democrats won back eight seats, narrowing the Republican majority to four. Democrats flipped one seat in districts 1 and 14, as well as flipping both seats in districts 32, 33, and 36.

== Incumbents not running for re-election ==
=== Democratic ===
- Joseph L. Bocchini Jr. (District 14) (ran for Mercer County Executive)
- Thomas H. Paterniti (District 18) (ran for State Senate)
- Vincent O. Pellecchia (District 35)

=== Republican ===
- Guy F. Muziani (District 1)
- Joseph W. Chinnici (District 1)
- Joseph Azzolina (District 13) (ran for State Senate)
- John K. Rafferty (District 14)
- Charles J. Catrillo (District 32) (ran for State Senate)
- Louis Kosco (District 38) (ran for State Senate)

== Summary of races ==
Voters in each legislative district elect two members to the New Jersey General Assembly.

District	Incumbent	Party	Elected	Party
1st Legislative District	Guy F. Muziani	Rep	Frank LoBiondo	Rep
1st Legislative District	Joseph W. Chinnici	Rep	Edward H. Salmon	Dem
2nd Legislative District	J. Edward Kline	Rep	J. Edward Kline	Rep
2nd Legislative District	Dolores G. Cooper	Rep	Dolores G. Cooper	Rep
3rd Legislative District	Jack Collins	Rep	Jack Collins	Rep
3rd Legislative District	Gary Stuhltrager	Rep	Gary Stuhltrager	Rep
4th Legislative District	Anthony S. Marsella	Dem	Anthony S. Marsella	Dem
4th Legislative District	Dennis L. Riley	Dem	Dennis L. Riley	Dem
5th Legislative District	Joseph J. Roberts (Note: Roberts won a July 1987 special election to complete the unexpired term of Assemblyman Francis J. Gorman, who resigned due to poor health.)	Dem	Joseph J. Roberts	Dem
5th Legislative District	Wayne R. Bryant	Dem	Wayne R. Bryant	Dem
6th Legislative District	John A. Rocco	Rep	John A. Rocco	Rep
6th Legislative District	Thomas J. Shusted	Rep	Thomas J. Shusted	Rep
7th Legislative District	Barbara Kalik	Dem	Barbara Kalik	Dem
7th Legislative District	Thomas P. Foy	Dem	Thomas P. Foy	Dem
8th Legislative District	Harold L. Colburn Jr.	Rep	Harold L. Colburn Jr.	Rep
8th Legislative District	Robert C. Shinn Jr.	Rep	Robert C. Shinn Jr.	Rep
9th Legislative District	John T. Hendrickson Jr.	Rep	John T. Hendrickson Jr.	Rep
9th Legislative District	Jeffrey Moran	Rep	Jeffrey Moran	Rep
10th Legislative District	John Paul Doyle	Dem	John Paul Doyle	Dem
10th Legislative District	Robert Singer	Rep	Robert Singer	Rep
11th Legislative District	Joseph A. Palaia	Rep	Joseph A. Palaia	Rep
11th Legislative District	Anthony M. Villane	Rep	Anthony M. Villane	Rep
12th Legislative District	Clare Farragher (Note: Farragher won a February 1987 special election to complete the unexpired term of Assemblywoman Marie Sheehan Muhler, who resigned to join the Department of Community Affairs.)	Rep	Clare Farragher	Rep
12th Legislative District	John O. Bennett	Rep	John O. Bennett	Rep
13th Legislative District	Joseph Azzolina	Rep	Joe Kyrillos	Rep
13th Legislative District	Joann H. Smith	Rep	Joann H. Smith	Rep
14th Legislative District	Joseph L. Bocchini Jr.	Dem	Joseph D. Patero	Dem
14th Legislative District	John K. Rafferty	Rep	Anthony Cimino	Dem
15th Legislative District	John S. Watson	Dem	John S. Watson	Dem
15th Legislative District	Gerald S. Naples	Dem	Gerald S. Naples	Dem
16th Legislative District	Walter J. Kavanaugh	Rep	Walter J. Kavanaugh	Rep
16th Legislative District	John S. Penn	Rep	John S. Penn	Rep
17th Legislative District	David C. Schwartz	Dem	David C. Schwartz	Dem
17th Legislative District	Bob Smith	Dem	Bob Smith	Dem
18th Legislative District	Thomas H. Paterniti	Dem	George A. Spadoro	Dem
18th Legislative District	Frank M. Pelly	Dem	Frank M. Pelly	Dem
19th Legislative District	George Otlowski	Dem	George Otlowski	Dem
19th Legislative District	Alan Karcher	Dem	Alan Karcher	Dem
20th Legislative District	Thomas J. Deverin	Dem	Thomas J. Deverin	Dem
20th Legislative District	George Hudak	Dem	George Hudak	Dem
21st Legislative District	Chuck Hardwick	Rep	Chuck Hardwick	Rep
21st Legislative District	Peter J. Genova	Rep	Peter J. Genova	Rep
22nd Legislative District	Bob Franks	Rep	Bob Franks	Rep
22nd Legislative District	Maureen Ogden	Rep	Maureen Ogden	Rep
23rd Legislative District	Bill Schluter (Note: Schluter won a July 1987 special election to complete the unexpired term of Assemblyman Dick Zimmer, who was elected to the State Senate.)	Rep	Bill Schluter	Rep
23rd Legislative District	Dick Kamin (Note: Kamin won an August 1986 special election to complete the unexpired term of Assemblyman Karl Weidel, who resigned to join the Department of Insurance.)	Rep	Dick Kamin	Rep
24th Legislative District	Robert E. Littell	Rep	Robert E. Littell	Rep
24th Legislative District	Chuck Haytaian	Rep	Chuck Haytaian	Rep
25th Legislative District	Rodney Frelinghuysen	Rep	Rodney Frelinghuysen	Rep
25th Legislative District	Arthur R. Albohn	Rep	Arthur R. Albohn	Rep
26th Legislative District	Robert J. Martin	Rep	Robert J. Martin	Rep
26th Legislative District	Ralph A. Loveys	Rep	Ralph A. Loveys	Rep
27th Legislative District	Harry A. McEnroe	Dem	Harry A. McEnroe	Dem
27th Legislative District	Mildred Barry Garvin	Dem	Stephanie R. Bush	Dem
28th Legislative District	Michael Adubato	Dem	Michael Adubato	Dem
28th Legislative District	James Zangari	Dem	James Zangari	Dem
29th Legislative District	Willie B. Brown	Dem	Willie B. Brown	Dem
29th Legislative District	Eugene H. Thompson	Dem	Jackie Mattison	Dem
30th Legislative District	John V. Kelly	Rep	John V. Kelly	Rep
30th Legislative District	Marion Crecco	Rep	Marion Crecco	Rep
31st Legislative District	Joe Doria	Dem	Joe Doria	Dem
31st Legislative District	Joseph Charles	Dem	Joseph Charles	Dem
32nd Legislative District	Frank J. Gargiulo	Rep	Anthony Impreveduto	Dem
32nd Legislative District	Charles J. Catrillo	Rep	David C. Kronick	Dem
33rd Legislative District	Ronald A. Dario	Rep	Bernard Kenny	Dem
33rd Legislative District	Jose Arango	Rep	Bob Menendez	Dem
34th Legislative District	Gerald Zecker	Rep	Gerald Zecker	Rep
34th Legislative District	Newton E. Miller	Rep	Newton E. Miller	Rep
35th Legislative District	John Girgenti	Dem	John Girgenti	Dem
35th Legislative District	Vincent O. Pellecchia	Dem	Bill Pascrell	Dem
36th Legislative District	Kathleen Donovan	Rep	Louis J. Gill	Dem
36th Legislative District	Paul DiGaetano	Rep	Thomas J. Duch	Dem
37th Legislative District	D. Bennett Mazur	Dem	D. Bennett Mazur	Dem
37th Legislative District	Byron Baer	Dem	Byron Baer	Dem
38th Legislative District	Pat Schuber	Rep	Pat Schuber	Rep
38th Legislative District	Louis F. Kosco	Rep	Patrick J. Roma	Rep
39th Legislative District	John E. Rooney	Rep	John E. Rooney	Rep
39th Legislative District	Elizabeth Randall	Rep	Elizabeth Randall	Rep
40th Legislative District	Walter M. D. Kern	Rep	Walter M. D. Kern	Rep
40th Legislative District	Nicholas Felice	Rep	Nicholas Felice	Rep

=== Close races ===
Districts where the difference of total votes between the top-two parties was under 10%:

1. District 1, 1.0% gain D
2. District 38, 4.4%
3. District 13, 5.2%
4. District 10, 5.4%
5. District 3, 7.6%
6. District 19, 7.8%
7. District 34, 9.3%
8. District 36, 9.6% gain

== District 1 ==
=== General election ===
==== Candidates ====
- Raymond A. Batten, candidate for Assembly in 1985 (Democratic)
- Frank LoBiondo, Cumberland County Freeholder (Republican)
- Edward H. Salmon, Cumberland County Freeholder and former mayor of Millville (Democratic)
- Gerald M. Thornton (Republican)

==== Results ====
New Jersey general election, 1987
Party	Candidate	Votes	%	±%
Republican	Frank A. LoBiondo	28,638	26.9	▼6.8
Democratic	Edward H. Salmon	27,561	25.9	▲9.4
Republican	Gerald M. Thornton	25,182	23.6	▼8.5
Democratic	Raymond A. Batten	25,166	23.6	▲5.8
Total votes		'106,547'	'100.0'	

== District 2 ==
=== General election ===
==== Candidates ====
- Dolores G. Cooper, incumbent Assembly member since 1982 (Republican)
- J. Edward Kline, incumbent Assembly member since 1984 (Republican)
- Fred Scerni (Democratic)
- William A. Thompson III (Democratic)

==== Results ====
New Jersey general election, 1987
Party	Candidate	Votes	%	±%
Republican	J. Edward Kline	26,754	33.3	▼0.8
Republican	Dolores G. Cooper	26,140	32.5	▲3.4
Democratic	Alfred "Fred" Scerni	15,234	19.0	▼2.2
Democratic	William A. Thompson III	12,216	15.2	▼0.4
Total votes		'80,344'	'100.0'	

== District 3 ==
=== General election ===
==== Candidates ====
- Jack Collins, incumbent Assembly member since 1986 (Republican)
- Paul A. Oland (Democratic)
- Gary Stuhltrager, incumbent Assembly member since 1986 (Republican)
- James G. Waddington (Democratic)

==== Results ====
New Jersey general election, 1987
Party	Candidate	Votes	%	±%
Republican	Gary W. Stuhltrager	27,819	27.1	▲1.4
Republican	Jack Collins	27,411	26.7	▲0.5
Democratic	James G. Waddington	23,779	23.1	▼1.4
Democratic	Paul A. Oland	23,755	23.1	▼0.5
Total votes		'102,764'	'100.0'	

== District 4 ==
=== General election ===
==== Candidates ====
- Anthony S. Marsella, incumbent Assembly member since 1982 (Democratic)
- John Matheussen, attorney (Republican)
- Dennis L. Riley, incumbent Assembly member since 1980 (Democratic)
- Wayne S. Wooster (Republican)

==== Results ====
New Jersey general election, 1987
Party	Candidate	Votes	%	±%
Democratic	Anthony S. Marsella	22,942	27.8	▲0.5
Democratic	Dennis L. Riley	22,676	27.4	▲0.6
Republican	Wayne S. Wooster	18,615	22.5	▼0.6
Republican	John Matheussen	18,408	22.3	▼0.5
Total votes		'82,641'	'100.0'	

== District 5 ==
=== General election ===
==== Candidates ====
- Wayne R. Bryant, incumbent Assembly member since 1982 (Democratic)
- Jose DeJesus Jr. (Republican)
- Raymond R. Groller (Republican)
- Joseph J. Roberts, incumbent Assembly member since July 1987 (Democratic)

==== Results ====
New Jersey general election, 1987
Party	Candidate	Votes	%	±%
Democratic	Wayne R. Bryant	25,214	34.9	▲4.2
Democratic	Joseph J. Roberts, Jr.	24,668	34.2	▲3.3
Republican	Raymond R. Groller	11,483	15.9	▼3.7
Republican	Jose DeJesus, Jr.	10,835	15.0	▼3.8
Total votes		'72,200'	'100.0'	

== District 6 ==
=== General election ===
==== Candidates ====
- Patrick J. Brennan (Democratic)
- John A. Rocco, incumbent Assembly member since 1980 (Republican)
- Thomas J. Shusted, incumbent Assembly member since 1978 (Note: Shusted previously served in the Assembly from 1970 to 1971.) (Republican)
- John J. Tarditi Jr. (Democratic)

==== Results ====
New Jersey general election, 1987
Party	Candidate	Votes	%	±%
Republican	John A. Rocco	33,057	29.0	▼3.7
Republican	Thomas J. Shusted	31,965	28.0	▼3.6
Democratic	John J. Tarditi, Jr.	25,112	22.0	▲3.6
Democratic	Patrick J. Brennan	24,028	21.0	▲3.7
Total votes		'114,162'	'100.0'	

== District 7 ==
=== General election ===
==== Candidates ====
- Renee L. Borstad, candidate for Assembly in 1985 (Republican)
- Vincent R. Faris (Republican)
- Thomas P. Foy, incumbent Assembly member since 1980 (Democratic)
- Barbara Kalik, incumbent Assembly member since 1978 (Democratic)

==== Results ====
New Jersey general election, 1987
Party	Candidate	Votes	%	±%
Democratic	Barbara Faith Kalik	25,388	30.2	▲0.8
Democratic	Thomas P. Foy	24,539	29.2	▲1.2
Republican	Vincent R. Farias	17,269	20.5	▼0.7
Republican	Renee L. Borstad	16,831	20.0	▼1.4
Total votes		'84,027'	'100.0'	

== District 8 ==
=== General election ===
==== Candidates ====
- Harold L. Colburn Jr., incumbent Assembly member since 1984 (Republican)
- Thomas Long (Democratic)
- Robert C. Shinn Jr., incumbent Assembly member since February 1985 (Republican)
- Harrison B. Slack, candidate for Assembly in 1985 (Democratic)

==== Results ====
New Jersey general election, 1987
Party	Candidate	Votes	%	±%
Republican	Harold L. Colburn	28,175	33.5	▼1.3
Republican	Robert C. Shinn	27,800	33.1	▼1.6
Democratic	Thomas Long	14,315	17.0	▲1.5
Democratic	H.B. (Scoop) Slack	13,741	16.4	▲1.7
Total votes		'84,031'	'100.0'	

== District 9 ==
=== General election ===
==== Candidates ====
- Judy Anderson (Democratic)
- John T. Hendrickson Jr., incumbent Assembly member since 1982 (Republican)
- Jeffrey Moran, incumbent Assembly member since 1986 (Republican)
- Harry F. Schmoll Jr. (Democratic)

==== Results ====
New Jersey general election, 1987
Party	Candidate	Votes	%	±%
Republican	John T. Hendrickson, Jr.	34,525	31.7	▼0.7
Republican	Jeffrey W. Moran	33,433	30.7	▼0.7
Democratic	Judy Anderson	20,772	19.1	▼0.4
Democratic	Harry F. Schmoll, Jr.	20,288	18.6	▲2.5
Total votes		'109,018'	'100.0'	

== District 10 ==
=== General election ===
==== Candidates ====
- John Paul Doyle, incumbent Assembly member since 1974 and former Assembly Majority Leader (Democratic)
- Marlene Lynch Ford, former Assembly member (Democratic)
- Robert A. Gasser (Republican)
- Robert Singer, incumbent Assembly member since 1986 and former mayor of Lakewood Township (Republican)

==== Results ====
New Jersey general election, 1987
Party	Candidate	Votes	%	±%
Democratic	John Paul Doyle	28,502	27.3	▲1.4
Republican	Robert W. Singer	27,171	26.0	▲0.5
Democratic	Marlene Lynch Ford	26,484	25.4	▲1.2
Republican	Robert A. Gasser	22,258	21.3	▼2.9
Total votes		'104,415'	'100.0'	

== District 11 ==
=== General election ===
==== Candidates ====
- Mary K. Blohm (Compulsory Education Law)
- John D'Amico Jr., Monmouth County Freeholder (Democratic)
- Joshua Leinsdorf (Compulsory Education Law)
- Joseph A. Palaia, incumbent Assembly member since 1982 (Republican)
- Joseph Quinn (Democratic)
- Anthony M. Villane, incumbent Assembly member since 1976 (Republican)

==== Results ====
New Jersey general election, 1987
Party	Candidate	Votes	%	±%
Republican	Joseph A. Palaia	25,973	28.1	▼6.3
Republican	Anthony M. Villane	25,725	27.8	▼6.3
Democratic	John D'Amico, Jr.	19,868	21.5	▲5.7
Democratic	Joseph Quinn	18,743	20.3	▲4.6
Compulsory Education Law	Mary K. Blohm	1,134	1.2	N/A
Compulsory Education Law	Joshua Leinsdorf	942	1.0	N/A
Total votes		'92,385'	'100.0'	

== District 12 ==
=== General election ===
==== Candidates ====
- Gene J. Anthony (Democratic)
- John O. Bennett, incumbent Assembly member since 1980 (Republican)
- Dante J. Massa (Democratic)
- Marie Sheehan Muhler, incumbent Assembly member since 1976 (Republican)

==== Results ====
New Jersey general election, 1987
Party	Candidate	Votes	%	±%
Republican	John O. Bennett	28,592	31.7	▼0.8
Republican	Clare M. Farragher	26,931	29.8	▼1.8
Democratic	Dante J. Massa	17,544	19.4	▲1.2
Democratic	Gene J. Anthony	17,217	19.1	▲1.4
Total votes		'90,284'	'100.0'	

== District 13 ==
=== General election ===
==== Candidates ====
- William Flynn, former Assembly member (Democratic)
- Joe Kyrillos, special assistant to the U.S. Secretary of the Interior (Republican)
- Joann H. Smith, incumbent Assembly member since 1986 (Republican)
- Jacqueline Walker, former Assembly member (Democratic)

==== Results ====
New Jersey general election, 1987
Party	Candidate	Votes	%	±%
Republican	Joann H. Smith	24,641	26.6	▲0.9
Republican	Joseph M. Kyrillos, Jr.	24,109	26.0	▼0.3
Democratic	William E. Flynn	22,013	23.7	▼0.5
Democratic	Jacqueline Walker	21,976	23.7	▼0.1
Total votes		'92,739'	'100.0'	

== District 14 ==
=== Democratic primary ===
==== Candidates ====
- Anthony J. Cimino, Mercer County Freeholder
- Janice Mironov, East Windsor municipal attorney
- Joseph D. Patero, former Assembly member from Manville

===== Declined =====
- Joseph L. Bocchini, incumbent Assembly member since 1982 (ran for Mercer County Executive)

=== Republican primary ===
==== Declined ====
- John K. Rafferty, incumbent Assembly member since 1986 and mayor of Hamilton Township (ran for re-election as mayor)

=== General election ===
==== Candidates ====
- Anthony J. Cimino, Mercer County Freeholder (Democratic)
- David J. Kenny (Republican)
- Joseph D. Patero, former Assembly member (Democratic)
- Walt Sodie (Republican)

==== Results ====
New Jersey general election, 1987
Party	Candidate	Votes	%	±%
Democratic	Anthony J. “Skip” Cimino	28,658	30.4	▲3.9
Democratic	Joseph D. Patero	28,371	30.1	▲5.2
Republican	David J. Kenny	18,820	20.0	▼6.1
Republican	Walt Sodie	18,338	19.5	▼3.0
Total votes		'94,187'	'100.0'	

== District 15 ==
=== General election ===
==== Candidates ====
- Arthur E. Frank (Republican)
- John S. Furlong (Republican)
- Gerald S. Naples, incumbent Assembly member since 1982 (Democratic)
- John S. Watson, incumbent Assembly member since 1982 (Democratic)

==== Results ====
New Jersey general election, 1987
Party	Candidate	Votes	%	±%
Democratic	Gerard S. Naples	26,923	33.2	▲5.3
Democratic	John S. Watson	26,484	32.6	▲4.4
Republican	Arthur E. Frank	14,193	17.5	▼4.7
Republican	John S. Furlong	13,596	16.7	▼5.0
Total votes		'81,196'	'100.0'	

== District 16 ==
=== General election ===
==== Candidates ====
- Walter J. Kavanaugh, incumbent Assembly member since 1976 (Republican)
- Adele Montgomery (Democratic)
- John S. Penn, incumbent Assembly member since 1984 (Republican)
- Alfred A. Wicklund (Democratic)

==== Results ====
New Jersey general election, 1987
Party	Candidate	Votes	%	±%
Republican	Walter J. Kavanaugh	28,325	35.8	▼3.1
Republican	John S. Penn	26,528	33.5	▼3.0
Democratic	Adele Montgomery	12,249	15.5	▲3.2
Democratic	Alfred A. Wicklund	12,032	15.2	▲3.2
Total votes		'79,134'	'100.0'	

== District 17 ==
=== General election ===
==== Candidates ====
- David C. Schwartz, incumbent Assembly member since 1978 (Democratic)
- Peter J. Selesky (Republican)
- Bob Smith, incumbent Assembly member since 1986 (Democratic)
- Dorothy Sonnenberg (Republican)

==== Results ====
New Jersey general election, 1987
Party	Candidate	Votes	%	±%
Democratic	David C. Schwartz	18,455	31.9	▲3.8
Democratic	Robert G. Smith	18,047	31.2	▲5.2
Republican	Dorothy Sonnenberg	10,780	18.6	▼6.8
Republican	Peter J. Selesky	10,529	18.2	▼2.4
Total votes		'57,811'	'100.0'	

== District 18 ==
=== Democratic primary ===
==== Candidates ====
- Frank M. Pelly, incumbent Assembly member since 1982
- George A. Spadoro, member of the Edison Township Council

===== Declined =====
- Thomas H. Paterniti, incumbent Assembly member since 1980 (ran for State Senate)

=== General election ===
==== Candidates ====
- Doris M. Fleming (Republican)
- Robert Maurer (Republican)
- Frank M. Pelly, incumbent Assembly member since 1982 (Democratic)
- George A. Spadoro, member of the Edison Township Council (Democratic)

==== Results ====
New Jersey general election, 1987
Party	Candidate	Votes	%	±%
Democratic	Frank M. Pelly	30,634	30.2	▲4.1
Democratic	George A. Spadoro	29,261	28.8	▲2.1
Republican	Robert “Dr. Bob” Maurer	21,332	21.0	▼3.0
Republican	Doris M. Fleming	20,234	19.9	▼3.3
Total votes		101,461	100.0	

== District 19 ==
=== General election ===
==== Candidates ====
- Alan Karcher, incumbent Assembly member since 1974 and former Speaker of the General Assembly (Democratic)
- George Otlowski, incumbent Assembly member since 1974 and mayor of Perth Amboy (Democratic)
- Beverly A. Samuelson (Republican)
- Emery Z. Toth, candidate for Assembly in 1985 (Republican)

==== Results ====
New Jersey general election, 1987
Party	Candidate	Votes	%	±%
Democratic	George J. Otlowski	24,098	27.3	▲0.6
Democratic	Alan J. Karcher	23,467	26.6	▲1.3
Republican	Emery Z. Toth	20,767	23.5	▼0.6
Republican	Beverly A. Samuelson	19,986	22.6	▼1.4
Total votes		'88,318'	'100.0'	

== District 20 ==
=== General election ===
==== Candidates ====
- Thomas J. Deverin, incumbent Assembly member since 1970 (Democratic)
- George Hudak, incumbent Assembly member since 1986 and mayor of Linden (Democratic)
- Peter Kobylarz (Republican)
- William Wnuck (Republican)

==== Results ====
New Jersey general election, 1987
Party	Candidate	Votes	%	±%
Democratic	Thomas J. Deverin	21,702	37.8	▲12.3
Democratic	George Hudak	21,380	37.2	▲14.1
Republican	William Wnuck	7,181	12.5	▼6.2
Republican	Peter Kobylarz	7,155	12.5	▼4.3
Total votes		'57,418'	'100.0'	

== District 21 ==
=== General election ===
==== Candidates ====
- Robert Blitz (Democratic)
- Brian W. Fahey (Democratic)
- Peter J. Genova, incumbent Assembly member since 1985 (Republican)
- Chuck Hardwick, incumbent Assembly member since 1978 and Speaker of the General Assembly since 1986 (Republican)

==== Results ====
New Jersey general election, 1987
Party	Candidate	Votes	%	±%
Republican	Chuck Hardwick	30,607	30.3	▼2.6
Republican	Peter Genova	28,317	28.0	▼3.2
Democratic	Brian W. Fahey	22,871	22.6	▲4.1
Democratic	Robert Blitz	19,297	19.1	▲2.5
Total votes		'101,092'	'100.0'	

== District 22 ==
=== General election ===
==== Candidates ====
- Bob Franks, incumbent Assembly member since 1980 (Republican)
- Robert J. Lafferty (Democratic)
- Maureen Ogden, incumbent Assembly member since 1982 (Republican)

==== Results ====
New Jersey general election, 1987
Party	Candidate	Votes	%	±%
Republican	Maureen Ogden	29,039	41.5	▲5.4
Republican	Bob Franks	27,304	39.0	▲3.5
Democratic	Robert J. Lafferty	13,597	19.4	▲5.2
Total votes		'69,940'	'100.0'	

== District 23 ==
=== General election ===
==== Candidates ====
- Edward J. Boccher (Democratic)
- Dick Kamin, incumbent Assembly member since 1986 (Republican)
- Frederick J. Katz Jr. (Democratic)
- Bill Schluter, former member of the New Jersey Senate and General Assembly (Republican)

==== Results ====
New Jersey general election, 1987
Party	Candidate	Votes	%	±%
Republican	William E. Schluter	23,589	36.3	▼7.7
Republican	Dick Kamin	23,073	35.5	▼6.6
Democratic	Edward J. Boccher	9,344	14.4	▲0.5
Democratic	Frederick J. Katz, Jr.	9,012	13.9	N/A
Total votes		'65,018'	'100.0'	

== District 24 ==
=== General election ===
==== Candidates ====
- Robert T. Davis, candidate for Assembly in 1985 (Democratic)
- Chuck Haytaian, incumbent Assembly member since 1982 (Republican)
- Robert E. Littell, incumbent Assembly member since 1968 (Republican)
- Edwin C. Selby (Democratic)

==== Results ====
New Jersey general election, 1987
Party	Candidate	Votes	%	±%
Republican	Garabed “Chuck” Haytaian	26,586	35.8	▲0.4
Republican	Robert E. Littell	25,942	34.9	▼2.4
Democratic	Robert T. Davis	11,154	15.0	▼0.6
Democratic	Edwin C. Selby	10,545	14.2	▲2.5
Total votes		'74,227'	'100.0'	

== District 25 ==
=== General election ===
==== Candidates ====
- Arthur R. Albohn, incumbent Assembly member since 1980 (Republican)
- Rodney Frelinghuysen, incumbent Assembly member since 1984 (Republican)
- George J. Stafford (Democratic)

==== Results ====
New Jersey general election, 1987
Party	Candidate	Votes	%	±%
Republican	Rodney P. Frelinghuysen	27,896	43.1	▲6.0
Republican	Arthur R. Albohn	23,537	36.4	▲2.4
Democratic	George J. Stafford	13,233	20.5	▲5.7
Total votes		64,666	100.0	

== District 26 ==
=== General election ===
==== Candidates ====
- Drew Britcher (Democratic)
- Ralph A. Loveys, incumbent Assembly member since 1984 (Republican)
- Robert Martin, incumbent Assembly member since 1985 (Republican)
- Paul E. Nagel (Democratic)

==== Results ====
New Jersey general election, 1987
Party	Candidate	Votes	%	±%
Republican	Robert J. Martin	22,915	34.4	▼3.2
Republican	Ralph A. Loveys	22,475	33.8	▼3.7
Democratic	Drew Britcher	10,936	16.4	▲3.8
Democratic	Paul E. Nagel	10,232	15.4	▲3.1
Total votes		'66,558'	'100.0'	

== District 27 ==
=== Democratic primary ===
==== Candidates ====
- Stephanie R. Bush, East Orange attorney
- Mildred Barry Garvin, incumbent Assembly member since 1978
- Christine Keno, East Orange resident
- Harry A. McEnroe, incumbent Assembly member since 1980 (Democratic)
- Catherine Willis, campaign manager for Mildred Barry Garvin

=== General election ===
==== Candidates ====
- Stephanie R. Bush, East Orange attorney (Democratic)
- Harry A. McEnroe, incumbent Assembly member since 1980 (Democratic)
- Lilliana Piccione (Republican)
- James C. Pitchford (Republican)

==== Results ====
New Jersey general election, 1987
Party	Candidate	Votes	%	±%
Democratic	Harry A. McEnroe	15,545	37.5	▲6.0
Democratic	Stephanie R. Bush	15,020	36.2	▲4.9
Republican	Lilliana Piccione	5,697	13.7	▼5.0
Republican	James C. Pitchford	5,211	12.6	▼5.8
Total votes		'41,473'	'100.0'	

== District 28 ==
=== General election ===
==== Candidates ====
- Michael Adubato, incumbent Assembly member since 1974 (Democratic)
- Howard E. Berkeley (Republican)
- Lawrence Hamm, community activist (People's Needs First)
- William P. Rutan (Republican)
- James Zangari, incumbent Assembly member since 1980 (Democratic)

==== Results ====
New Jersey general election, 1987
Party	Candidate	Votes	%	±%
Democratic	Michael F. Adubato	9,680	36.8	▲6.4
Democratic	James Zangari	9,375	35.6	▲6.2
Republican	Howard E. Berkeley	2,810	10.7	▼10.2
Republican	William P. Rutan	2,599	9.9	▼9.3
People's Needs First	Lawrence Hamm	1,850	7.0	N/A
Total votes		'26,314'	'100.0'	

== District 29 ==
=== General election ===
==== Candidates ====
- Willie B. Brown, incumbent Assembly member since 1974 (Democratic)
- Kurt A. Culbreath, candidate for Assembly in 1985 (Republican)
- Jackie Mattison, chief of staff to mayor of Newark Sharpe James (Democratic)
- Shahid S. Watson (Republican)

==== Results ====
New Jersey general election, 1987
Party	Candidate	Votes	%	±%
Democratic	Willie B. Brown	9,740	43.0	▲7.8
Democratic	Jackie R. Mattison	8,911	39.4	▲5.7
Republican	Shahid S. Watson	2,225	9.8	▼6.4
Republican	Kurt A. Culbreath	1,766	7.8	▼7.2
Total votes		'22,642'	'100.0'	

== District 30 ==
=== General election ===
==== Candidates ====
- Marion Crecco, incumbent Assembly member since 1986 (Republican)
- Cynthia DeBonis (Democratic)
- John V. Kelly, incumbent Assembly member since 1986 (Republican)
- James A. Plaisted (Democratic)

==== Results ====
New Jersey general election, 1987
Party	Candidate	Votes	%	±%
Republican	John V. Kelly	26,681	33.9	▲5.6
Republican	Marion Crecco	25,827	32.8	▲6.8
Democratic	Cynthia A. DeBonis	13,537	17.2	▼6.2
Democratic	James A. Plaisted	12,768	16.2	▼6.1
Total votes		'78,813'	'100.0'	

== District 31 ==
=== General election ===
==== Candidates ====
- Joseph Charles, incumbent Assembly member since 1982 (Democratic)
- Joseph Doria, incumbent Assembly member since 1980 (Democratic)
- Modesto Daniel Fiume (Republican)
- James V. McNally Jr. (Republican)

==== Results ====
New Jersey general election, 1987
Party	Candidate	Votes	%	±%
Democratic	Joseph Charles, Jr.	22,169	38.8	▲8.2
Democratic	Joseph V. Doria, Jr.	21,993	38.5	▲6.7
Republican	James V. McNally, Jr.	6,962	12.2	▼6.9
Republican	Modesto Daniel Fiume	5,947	10.4	▼8.2
Total votes		57,071	100.0	

== District 32 ==
=== General election ===
==== Candidates ====
- Cathy Borer (Politicians Are Crooks)
- Peter Galbo (Politicians Are Crooks)
- Frank J. Gargiulo, incumbent Assembly member since 1986 (Republican)
- Anthony Impreveduto, member of the Secaucus Town Council (Democratic)
- David C. Kronick (Democratic)
- Lee S. Lichtenberger (Republican)

==== Results ====
New Jersey general election, 1987
Party	Candidate	Votes	%	±%
Democratic	Anthony Impreveduto	25,291	32.2	▲9.5
Democratic	David C. Kronick	23,500	29.9	▲8.4
Republican	Frank J. Gargiulo	15,708	20.0	▼7.1
Republican	Lee S. Lichtenberger	13,310	16.9	▼9.8
Politicians Are Crooks	Peter Galbo	421	0.5	▼0.5
Politicians Are Crooks	Cathy Borer	377	0.5	▼0.4
Total votes		'78,607'	'100.0'	

== District 33 ==
=== General election ===
==== Candidates ====
- Jose Arango, incumbent Assembly member since 1986 (Republican)
- Michael P. Dapuzzo ("Pride-Responsibility")
- Bernard Kenny, former Hoboken assistant corporation counsel (Democratic)
- Bob Menendez, mayor of Union City (Democratic)
- Wanda Morales ("Pride-Responsibility")
- Angelo M. Valente (Republican)

==== Results ====
New Jersey general election, 1987
Party	Candidate	Votes	%	±%
Democratic	Bernard F. Kenny, Jr.	18,810	29.6	▲5.8
Democratic	Robert Menendez	18,446	29.0	▲7.6
Republican	Angelo M. Valente	12,888	20.2	▼7.7
Republican	Jose O. Arango	12,638	19.9	▼7.0
"Pride-Responsibility"	Michael P. Dapuzzo	557	0.9	N/A
"Pride-Responsibility"	Wanda Morales	312	0.5	N/A
Total votes		'63,651'	'100.0'	

== District 34 ==
=== General election ===
==== Candidates ====
- William L. Kattak (Democratic)
- Gloria J. Kolodziej (Democratic)
- Newton Edward Miller, incumbent Assembly member since 1980 (Republican)
- Gerald H. Zecker, incumbent Assembly member since 1984 (Republican)

==== Results ====
New Jersey general election, 1987
Party	Candidate	Votes	%	±%
Republican	Gerald Zecker	24,618	27.6	▼4.7
Republican	Newton E. Miller	24,106	27.0	▼5.1
Democratic	Gloria J. Kolodziej	20,726	23.2	▲5.2
Democratic	William L. Kattak	19,696	22.1	▲4.5
Total votes		'89,146'	'100.0'	

== District 35 ==
=== Democratic primary ===
==== Candidates ====
- John Girgenti, incumbent Assembly member since 1978
- Bill Pascrell, member of the Paterson Board of Education and chair of the Passaic County Democratic Committee

===== Withdrew =====
- Roy Griffin, president of the Paterson City Council
- William Kline, assistant superintendent of Paterson Public Schools

=== General election ===
==== Candidates ====
- Robert Angele (Republican)
- Martin G. Barnes, member of the Paterson City Council (Republican)
- John Girgenti, incumbent Assembly member since 1978 (Democratic)
- Bill Pascrell, member of the Paterson Board of Education and chair of the Passaic County Democratic Committee (Democratic)

==== Results ====
New Jersey general election, 1987
Party	Candidate	Votes	%	±%
Democratic	John Girgenti	18,345	35.6	▲5.4
Democratic	Bill Pascrell	17,670	34.3	▲8.0
Republican	Martin G. Barnes	8,546	16.6	▼5.3
Republican	Robert Angele	6,955	13.5	▼8.1
Total votes		'51,516'	'100.0'	

== District 36 ==
=== General election ===
==== Candidates ====
- Andrew E. Bertone (Republican)
- Frakn B. Calandriello (Republican)
- Thomas J. Duch, mayor of Garfield (Democratic)
- Louis J. Gill, member of the Passaic City Council (Democratic)

==== Results ====
New Jersey general election, 1987
Party	Candidate	Votes	%	±%
Democratic	Louis J. Gill	23,103	27.7	▲4.1
Democratic	Thomas J. Duch	22,667	27.1	▲5.2
Republican	Frank B. Calandriello	19,659	23.5	▼3.9
Republican	Andrew E. Bertone	18,085	21.7	▼5.5
Total votes		'83,514'	'100.0'	

== District 37 ==
=== General election ===
==== Candidates ====
- Byron Baer, incumbent Assembly member since 1972 (Democratic)
- Anthony J. Cassano (Republican)
- Barry N. Frank (Republican)
- D. Bennett Mazur, incumbent Assembly member since 1982 (Democratic)

==== Results ====
New Jersey general election, 1987
Party	Candidate	Votes	%	±%
Democratic	D. Bennett Mazur	28,801	31.4	▲4.4
Democratic	Byron Baer	28,575	31.2	▲4.3
Republican	Anthony J. Cassano	17,341	18.9	▼5.0
Republican	Barry N. Frank	16,895	18.4	▼3.7
Total votes		'91,612'	'100.0'	

== District 38 ==
=== General election ===
==== Candidates ====
- Joseph Capizzi (Democratic)
- Patrick J. Roma, member of the Palisades Park Borough Council (Republican)
- John J. Ryan Jr. (Democratic)
- Pat Schuber, incumbent Assembly member since 1982 (Republican)

==== Results ====
New Jersey general election, 1987
Party	Candidate	Votes	%	±%
Republican	William P. Schuber	23,566	27.1	▼3.7
Republican	Patrick J. Roma	21,791	25.1	▼5.1
Democratic	John J. Ryan, Jr.	20,894	24.1	▲4.3
Democratic	Joseph Capizzi	20,576	23.7	▲4.8
Total votes		'86,827'	'100.0'	

== District 39 ==
=== General election ===
==== Candidates ====
- Robert P. Bonnano (Democratic)
- William J. Daly (Democratic)
- Elizabeth Randall, assistant counsel to Governor Thomas Kean (Republican)
- John E. Rooney, incumbent Assembly member since 1983 (Republican)

==== Results ====
New Jersey general election, 1987
Party	Candidate	Votes	%	±%
Republican	Elizabeth E. Randall	29,548	32.3	▼1.0
Republican	John E. Rooney	28,619	31.3	▼0.3
Democratic	William J. Daly	17,083	18.7	▲1.0
Democratic	Robert P. Bonanno	16,264	17.8	▲0.5
Total votes		91,514	100.0	

== District 40 ==
=== General election ===
==== Candidates ====
- Nicholas Felice, incumbent Assembly member since 1982 (Republican)
- Walter M. D. Kern, incumbent Assembly member since 1978 (Republican)
- Michael Harris (Michael Harris Libertarian)
- Edward F. Seavers Jr. (Democratic)
- Michael S. Taaffe (Democratic)

==== Results ====
New Jersey general election, 1987
Party	Candidate	Votes	%	±%
Republican	Walter M. D. Kern, Jr.	27,767	34.6	▼1.3
Republican	Nicholas R. Felice	26,980	33.6	▼2.2
Democratic	Michael S. Taaffe	12,535	15.6	▲1.2
Democratic	Edward F. Seavers, Jr.	12,366	15.4	▲1.6
Michael Harris Libertarian	Michael Harris	538	0.7	N/A
Total votes		'80,186'	'100.0'	

== See also ==
- 1987 New Jersey Senate election
