= Michael J. Baker =

American politician

Member of the New Jersey General Assembly from the 18th district
- In office July 15, 1991 – January 14, 1992 Serving with George A. Spadoro
- Preceded by: Frank M. Pelly
- Succeeded by: Harriet E. Derman; Jeffrey A. Warsh

Personal details
- Born: 1956/1957 (age 68–69)
- Party: Democratic

Michael J. Baker (born 1956/1957) is an American attorney and Democratic Party politician who was appointed to represent the 18th Legislative District in the New Jersey General Assembly, where he served from 1991 to 1992.

A resident of East Brunswick, New Jersey, Baker served four years on the East Brunswick township council. After Frank M. Pelly was nominated to head the New Jersey Lottery, Baker was chosen by Democrats in April 1991 to fill the vacant seat to represent the 18th Legislative District in the New Jersey General Assembly and to run for a full term of office. He was sworn into office on July 15, 1991.

In the 1991 Republican landslide, Jack Sinagra took the Senate seat vacated by Democrat Thomas H. Paterniti, while in the Assembly race, Harriet E. Derman and running mate Jeffrey A. Warsh were elected, knocking off Baker and his incumbent running mate George A. Spadoro.
