= Jeffrey A. Warsh =

American politician (born 1960)

Member of the New Jersey General Assembly from the 18th district
- In office January 12, 1992 – January 9, 1996
- Preceded by: Michael J. Baker; George A. Spadoro
- Succeeded by: Peter J. Barnes Jr.

Personal details
- Born: September 21, 1960 (age 66)
- Party: Republican
- Spouse: Amy Frances Loeb
- Education: Emory University School of Law (JD); Rutgers University; Franklin & Marshall College (BA)

Jeffrey A. Warsh (born September 21, 1960) is an American attorney and politician who served two terms in the New Jersey General Assembly, from 1992 to 1996, where he represented the 18th Legislative District, which covers portions of Middlesex County. He later was executive director of NJ Transit.

== Early life and education ==
Warsh grew up in New Milford, New Jersey, and graduated from Dwight-Englewood School in 1978. Warsh earned his undergraduate degree from Franklin & Marshall College and was awarded a J.D. degree from Emory University School of Law. He was an attorney with the Eatontown firm of Ansell Zaro Bennett & Grimm.

== Political career ==
In the 1991 statewide Republican landslide, triggered in the wake of Governor of New Jersey Jim Florio's $2.8 billion tax increase package, Warsh and running mate Harriet E. Derman were elected to the General Assembly, knocking off Democratic incumbent George A. Spadoro and his running mate Michael J. Baker, while Jack Sinagra took the Senate seat vacated by Democrat Thomas H. Paterniti. Derman and Warsh won re-election in 1993, defeating former Assemblymember Thomas H. Paterniti and his running mate Matthew Vaughn.

Warsh and Stephen A. Mikulak sponsored a bill in 1992 that would ban the use of radar-equipped traffic enforcement cameras by law enforcement agencies in New Jersey, arguing that the system was "nothing less than a full, frontal assault on the system of American jurisprudence" that would replace "the tradition that we are innocent until proven guilty." Warsh served in the Assembly as chair of the Regulatory and Oversight Committee. While in office, in June 1995, Warsh married Amy Frances Loeb, a producer of television and radio commercials.

Warsh's running mate Harriet Derman left office in February 1994 after being appointed to head the New Jersey Department of Community Affairs. Democrat Barbara Buono knocked off Republican appointee Joanna Gregory-Scocchi in a November 1994 special election. Both parties had targeted the 18th District in the 1995 elections, with Republicans outspending Democrats in the district by a 2–1 margin. In a race characterized by strong negative campaigning and low turnout, described by Buono as the lowest turnout in 75 years, Warsh lost with running mate Jane Tousman to Buono and her running mate Peter J. Barnes II, recovering both seats for the Democrats.

In July 1999, Governor Christine Todd Whitman nominated Warsh as the executive director of NJ Transit. A self-described train buff, Warsh oversaw the third-largest transit agency nationwide, and earned an annual salary of $165,000 in 2002 for the post. In March 2002, Governor of New Jersey Jim McGreevey forced Warsh to resign from his position at NJ Transit with two years remaining on his contract, with a gubernatorial aide citing capacity shortfalls as one of the reason for his early termination.
