= Harriet E. Derman =

American politician

Chief of Staff to the Governor of New Jersey
- In office 1996–1998
- Governor: Christine Todd Whitman
- Preceded by: Peter Verniero
- Succeeded by: Michael P. Torpey

Commissioner of the New Jersey Department of Community Affairs
- In office February 7, 1994 – May 1, 1996
- Governor: Christine Todd Whitman
- Preceded by: Stephanie R. Bush
- Succeeded by: Jane Kenny

Member of the New Jersey General Assembly from the 18th district
- In office January 14, 1992 – February 8, 1994
- Preceded by: George A. Spadoro; Michael J. Baker
- Succeeded by: Joanna Gregory-Scocchi

Personal details
- Born: November 4, 1943 (age 82)
- Party: Republican (before 2015); Independent (2015-present)

Harriet E. Derman (born November 4, 1943) is an American lawyer and Republican Party politician who was elected to two terms in the New Jersey General Assembly, where she represented the 18th Legislative District from 1992 to 1996. She later served as head of the New Jersey Department of Community Affairs, legal counsel and as chief of staff to Governor of New Jersey Christine Todd Whitman, and later served as a New Jersey Superior Court judge.

A resident of Metuchen, Derman is a graduate of New York University and the Seton Hall University School of Law. She had served in 1992 as president of the Middlesex County Bar Association and as first vice chairwoman of the taxation section of the New Jersey Bar Association.

Derman had been an attorney with the firm of Weiner, Hendler & Derman, specializing in tax law, when she was elected to the General Assembly in 1991 together with running mate Jeffrey A. Warsh, knocking off Democratic incumbent George A. Spadoro and his running mate Michael J. Baker. Derman supported a bill in 1992 that would allow doctors and lawyers to serve as intermediaries in arranging adoptions in the state, saying that "we should do everything we can to encourage adoption versus abortion". Derman and Warsh won re-election in 1993, defeating former Assemblymember Thomas H. Paterniti and his running mate Matthew Vaughn.

After Christine Whitman took office in 1994, she named Derman to head the Department of Community Affairs, where she was responsible for a $1 billion budget and some 1,000 employees. Republican Joanna Gregory-Scocchi was chosen by a Republican special convention to fill Derman's vacancy. In a November 1994 special election, early favorite Gregory-Scocchi was defeated by Barbara Buono, after disclosures that a temporary employment firm owned by Gregory-Scocchi had hired illegal immigrants.

Derman become Whitman's chief counsel in May 1996 and became her chief of staff a few weeks later when Peter Verniero was named as New Jersey Attorney General as part of a series of changes made after the resignation of New Jersey Supreme Court Chief Justice Robert Wilentz. Derman stepped down after 18 months as chief of staff, announcing in November 1997 that she would be leaving to spend more time with her family. Whitman announced that Derman would be named to serve as a New Jersey Superior Court judge.

In July 2003, Chief Justice Deborah T. Poritz elevated Derman to be the Presiding Judge of the Civil Division of Superior Court in Somerset County.

Derman left the bench in 2009. She is now a member of a law firm headed by former New Jersey governor Donald DiFrancesco.

Political offices
Preceded by Peter Verniero	Chief of Staff to the Governor of New Jersey; 1996 – 1998	Succeeded by Michael P. Torpey
