= Choi Jun-hee =

Choi Jun-Hee is the name of:

- Juniel (born 1993), South Korean singer and songwriter
- Jun Choi (born 1971), American politician, former mayor of Edison, New Jersey
