= Martin E. Kravarik =

American politician (born 1936)

Member of the New Jersey General Assembly from the 7B district
- In office January 13, 1970 – January 11, 1972 Serving with Donald Macrae
- Preceded by: Robert K. Haelig; Frank J. Coury
- Succeeded by: James Bornheimer; John H. Froude

Personal details
- Born: January 20, 1936 The Bronx, New York City, New York
- Died: April 4, 2018 (aged 82) Princeton, New Jersey
- Party: Republican
- Education: Rutgers University (BA); Seton Hall University (JD)

Martin E. Kravarik (January 20, 1936 – April 4, 2018) was an American politician who served in the New Jersey General Assembly from District 7B from 1970 to 1972.

Born in The Bronx, Kravarik grew up in Irvington, New Jersey, and attended Irvington High School and Rutgers University. He was a pilot in the United States Air Force and graduated from Seton Hall University School of Law.

A longtime resident of the Kendall Park neighborhood of South Brunswick, New Jersey, Kravarik died on April 4, 2018, in Princeton, New Jersey at age 82.
