= Thomas Lankey =

American politician

Mayor of Edison
- In office January 1, 2014 – January 1, 2022
- Preceded by: Antonia Ricigliano
- Succeeded by: Sam Joshi

Councilman Edison
- In office 2010–2014

Personal details
- Born: 1961 (age 63–64); Edison, New Jersey
- Political party: Democratic
- Website: http://www.edisonnj.org/mayor/

Thomas Lankey was the Mayor of Edison, New Jersey, the state's 6th largest municipality by population, with about 108,000 residents. He won the November 2013 election and was sworn in on January 1, 2014. He was previously a town councilperson. Soon after taking office, Lankey said he would re-write the town's code of ethics. He won reelection in 2017, winning 58.7% of the vote. He did not seek party backing in the 2021 election and dropped out of there race, endorsing Sam Joshi, who won and replaced him.

== Background ==
Lankey is a lifelong resident of Edison, and a 1978 graduate of Wardlaw-Hartridge School. He has a Bachelor of Science in accounting from the University of Delaware. He is a senior vice president at JFK Health System, and previously served as vice chairman of the board of directors of Magyar Bank.

== See also ==
- Mayor of Edison, New Jersey
