= David Himelman =

American politician

Member of the New Jersey Senate from the 18th district
- In office November 26, 2001 – January 8, 2002
- Preceded by: Jack Sinagra
- Succeeded by: Barbara Buono

Personal details
- Party: Republican
- Education: Rutgers University; University of Bridgeport

David Himelman is an American politician. He served as a Republican member for the New Jersey's 18th legislative district in the New Jersey Senate from November 2001 until January 2002. He received his undergraduate degree from Rutgers University in 1983 and a Juris Doctor degree from the University of Bridgeport in 1986. He was appointed to the New Jersey Senate in 2001 to fill the remaining weeks of Jack Sinagra's term after he was appointed to the Port Authority of New York and New Jersey by Governor Donald DiFrancesco. He previously served as Township Attorney in East Brunswick from 1995 until 1998. and as Township Attorney in North Brunswick from January 2000 until his resignation in February 2001.
