= Mayor of Edison, New Jersey =

Political office in the United States

Mayor of Edison
- The Seal of Township of Edison

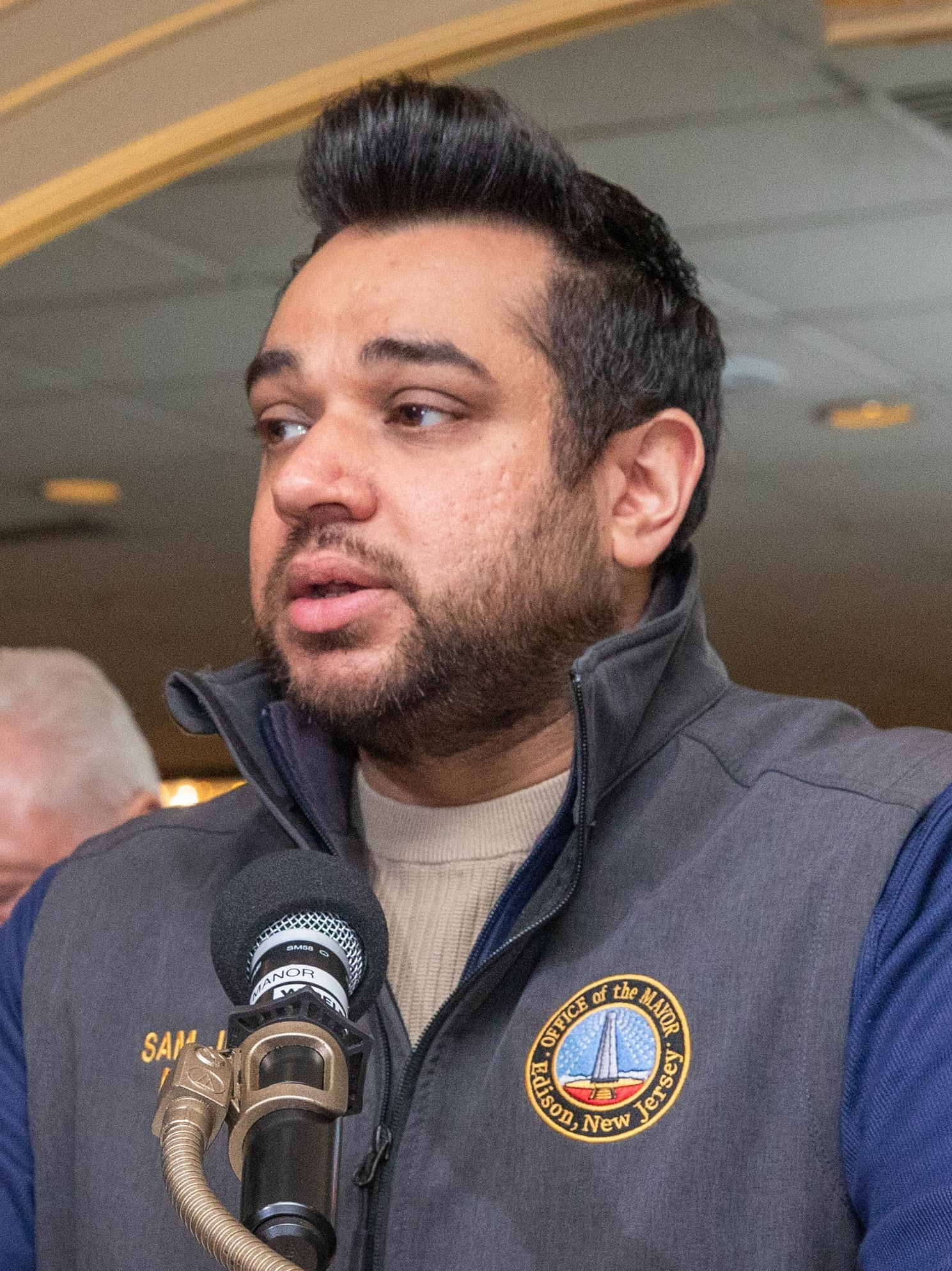
- Incumbent; Sam Joshi since January 1, 2022
- Inaugural holder: Julius C. Engel
- Formation: 1931
- Salary: $135,000 as of 2022
- Website: Office of the Mayor (Official)

List of mayors of Raritan Township and Edison Township, New Jersey, United States. The township was renamed from Raritan to Edison in November 1954.

Image	Name	Term start date	Term end date	Number of consecutive terms	Notes
	Edward E. Meeker †	1927	April 1, 1930		First official mayor Died in office on April 1, 1930
	Peter Knudsen (Acting)	April 1930	1931		
	Julius C. Engel	1931	1935		
	Walter C. Christensen	1935			Top vote earner in the 1935 election. Appointed the next mayor.
	?				
	Julius C. Engel	1947	1951		
	James C. Forgione	1951	May 17, 1955	1	
	Thomas J. Swales Jr.	May 17, 1955	January 1, 1958	1	
	Anthony M. Yelencsics †	January 1, 1958	January 1, 1970	3	Died in office
	Bernard James Dwyer	January 1, 1970	January 1, 1974	1	
	Thomas H. Paterniti	January 1, 1974	January 1, 1978	1	
	Anthony M. Yelencsics	January 1, 1978	April 25, 1989	3	
	Steven J. Capestro	April 25, 1989	January 1, 1990	1	
	Thomas H. Paterniti	January 1, 1990	January 1, 1991	1	
	Samuel V. Convery Jr.	January 1, 1991	January 1, 1994	1	
	George A. Spadoro	January 1, 1994	January 1, 2006	3	
	Jun Choi	January 1, 2006	January 1, 2010	1	
	Antonia Ricigliano	January 1, 2010	January 1, 2014	1	
	Thomas Lankey	January 1, 2014	January 1, 2022	2	
	Sam Joshi	January 1, 2022	Current		
