= Peter Verniero =

American judge

Associate Justice of the New Jersey Supreme Court
- In office 1999–2004
- Governor: Christine Todd Whitman
- Preceded by: Stewart G. Pollock
- Succeeded by: Roberto A. Rivera-Soto

51st Attorney General of New Jersey
- In office July 10, 1996 – May 15, 1999
- Governor: Christine Whitman
- Preceded by: Deborah Poritz
- Succeeded by: John Farmer Jr.

Chief of Staff to the Governor of New Jersey
- In office 1995–1996
- Governor: Christine Whitman
- Preceded by: Judy Shaw
- Succeeded by: Harriet E. Derman

Chief Counsel to the Governor of New Jersey
- In office 1994–1995
- Governor: Christine Whitman
- Preceded by: Scott A. Weiner
- Succeeded by: Margaret Foti

Personal details
- Born: April 30, 1959 (age 67)
- Party: Republican
- Education: Drew University (BA); Duke University (JD)

Peter G. Verniero (born April 30, 1959, in Montclair, New Jersey) is an American lawyer and jurist from New Jersey. He previously served as a justice of the New Jersey Supreme Court and as New Jersey Attorney General; he is presently in private practice in New Jersey.

== Education and early career ==
Born in Montclair, New Jersey, and raised in Montville, New Jersey, Verniero graduated from Montville Township High School in 1977. Verniero graduated summa cum laude from Drew University in 1981, where he was elected to Phi Beta Kappa. He received a J.D. degree from Duke University School of Law in 1984. Following law school, Verniero served as a law clerk to New Jersey Supreme Court Justice Robert. L. Clifford.

From 1985 to 1994 Verniero was an attorney in private practice and active in New Jersey Republican politics. He was appointed Governor Christine Todd Whitman’s first chief counsel in 1994. In this position he oversaw state authorities, legislation, executive orders, pardons, and judicial nominations for the governor. In 1995 Whitman elevated Verniero to the position of chief of staff.

== New Jersey Attorney General ==
In 1996, following Deborah T. Poritz’s nomination to the New Jersey Supreme Court, Whitman named Verniero as the 51st attorney general of New Jersey. Verniero was sworn in on July 10, 1996. In this position, he oversaw state criminal justice, legal affairs, gaming enforcement, consumer affairs, highway safety, the state police and professional regulation. As the attorney general serves a term concurrent with that of the governor, Whitman renominated Verniero in January 1998 and he was confirmed a second time by the state senate on January 20, 1998.

While attorney general, Verniero successfully defended Megan’s Law, New Jersey’s sexual offender notification statute, before the U.S. Court of Appeals for the Third Circuit. Verniero also represented the State of New Jersey before the U.S. Supreme Court in New Jersey v. New York, 523 U.S. 767 (1998), a case settling a boundary dispute over Ellis Island. The Supreme Court declared 90 percent of the present-day island to be a part of New Jersey. Verniero also led statewide initiatives to improve public school safety, aid victims of domestic violence and sexual assault and provide fairness and uniformity in drug case sentencing.

== Justice of the New Jersey Supreme Court ==
In 1999, Whitman appointed Verniero to a seat on the state Supreme Court vacated by Justice Stewart G. Pollock. At the time, Verniero’s nomination was criticized on account of his youth and relative lack of trial experience. He was 39 at the time of his nomination. Between 1999 and 2004, Verniero authored 124 decisions on a variety of matters, 72 of which were majority opinions. Verniero wrote the opinion of the Court in In re PSE&G Shareholder Litigation, 173 N.J. 258 (2002), establishing a modified business judgment rule, which has since been favorably cited by courts across the country.

In 2001 Verniero came under attack for statements he made to the New Jersey Senate during his 1999 confirmation hearings regarding allegations of racial profiling by the New Jersey State Police. Senators had said Verniero was not completely forthcoming regarding racial profiling during his tenure as attorney general, an accusation he strongly denied. An attempt to impeach Verniero failed in the New Jersey General Assembly.

On September 30, 2003, Verniero announced that he would retire from the Supreme Court at the end of the Court’s 2004 term. Although named to a seven-year term expiring in 2006, Verniero cited as reasons for his departure both financial considerations and a desire to avoid further debate during any potential reappointment hearing. As a candidate for governor in 2001, James McGreevey had said he would not reappoint Verniero if he was governor in 2006, though later comments by McGreevey suggested he had softened his position. In a press release following Verniero’s announcement McGreevey lauded Verniero for his distinguished service and his insightful, scholarly opinions. Similarly, the New Jersey State Bar Association, a vocal early critic of Verniero, noted that their concerns about his inexperience had been relieved by his performance on the bench and dedication to the justice system.

== 2004 to present ==
After stepping down from the Court, Verniero joined the Newark-based law firm of Sills Cummis & Gross P.C., where he chairs the Corporate Internal Investigations and Appellate Practice groups.

In 2010, Verniero was recruited by Governor Chris Christie to chair the seven-member Judicial Advisory Panel. The panel screens all candidates for Superior Court judgeships in New Jersey and makes recommendations to the governor and his staff. He served on the panel until 2015. The state has also retained Verniero to serve as special counsel on a variety of high-profile matters, including state education funding and higher education restructuring.

Verniero continues to be actively involved in issues related to New Jersey public safety and welfare through his support of various charitable organizations. Verniero has helped raise funds for organizations like SAFE in Hunterdon, which provides shelter and care for victims of domestic violence, and Crime Stoppers, a nationwide initiative to encourage anonymous tips to aid law enforcement. Verniero also served as a member of the board of the Hunterdon Healthcare System.

In 2016, the New Jersey Bar Foundation, an arm of the State Bar Association, announced that Verniero was that year's recipient of its highest award, the Medal of Honor, conferred annually to those who make exemplary contributions to the legal profession.

Since the death of former Appellate Division Judge Sylvia Pressler in 2010, Verniero has been the commentator and annotator of the Gann Law Books edition of the Rules Governing the Courts of the State of New Jersey, which is a commonly used edition of the Court Rules in New Jersey.

Verniero is frequently published as an authority on matters related to New Jersey public policy and the judiciary in such publications as the New York Times, Wall Street Journal and the Star-Ledger of Newark.

== Personal details ==
Verniero is married to the former Lisa Gaede and has two children: Jaye and Madeline.

== Majority judicial opinions ==
=== 1999-2000 term ===
- Lacey Municipal Utilities Authority v. NJDEP (http://njlaw.rutgers.edu/collections/courts/supreme/a-54-98.opn.html)
- Lapka v. Porter Hayden (http://njlaw.rutgers.edu/collections/courts/supreme/a-93-98.opn.html)
- State v. Lark (http://njlaw.rutgers.edu/collections/courts/supreme/a-113-98.opn.html)
- Schneider v. Simonini (http://njlaw.rutgers.edu/collections/courts/supreme/a-84-98.opn.html)
- State v. Presha (http://njlaw.rutgers.edu/collections/courts/supreme/a-79-98.opn.html)
- Golden v. County of Union (http://njlaw.rutgers.edu/collections/courts/supreme/a-105-98.opn.html)
- Wanetick v. Gateway Mitsubishi (http://njlaw.rutgers.edu/collections/courts/supreme/a-106-98.opn.html)
- State v. Cooke (http://njlaw.rutgers.edu/collections/courts/supreme/a-115-98.opn.html)
- Cavanaugh v. Skil Corp. (http://njlaw.rutgers.edu/collections/courts/supreme/a-30-99.opn.html)
- Kurzke v. Nissan Motor Company (http://njlaw.rutgers.edu/collections/courts/supreme/a-127-98.opn.html)
- Cox v. RKA Corporation (http://njlaw.rutgers.edu/collections/courts/supreme/a-81-98.opn.html)
- Estate of Roach v. TRW, Inc. (http://njlaw.rutgers.edu/collections/courts/supreme/a-74-99.opn.html)
- Dynasty v. The Princeton Insurance Company (http://njlaw.rutgers.edu/collections/courts/supreme/a-31-99.opn.html)
- State v. Robinson (http://njlaw.rutgers.edu/collections/courts/supreme/a-48-99.opn.html)
- Rocci v. Ecole Scondaire (http://njlaw.rutgers.edu/collections/courts/supreme/a-34-99.opn.html)

=== 2000-2001 term ===
- State v. Zhu (http://njlaw.rutgers.edu/collections/courts/supreme/a-75-99.opn.html)
- Ali v. Rutgers (http://njlaw.rutgers.edu/collections/courts/supreme/a-68-99.opn.html)
- State v. Maisonet (http://njlaw.rutgers.edu/collections/courts/supreme/a-98-99.opn.html)
- Garfinkel v. Morristown Obstetrics & Gynecology Assoc. (http://njlaw.rutgers.edu/collections/courts/supreme/a-52-00.opn.html)
- IMO Trust Created by John Seward Johnson (http://njlaw.rutgers.edu/collections/courts/supreme/a-69-99.opn.html)
- Alderiso v. The Medical Center of Ocean County (http://njlaw.rutgers.edu/collections/courts/supreme/a-100-99.opn.html)
- Packard-Bamberger & Co. v. Collier (http://njlaw.rutgers.edu/collections/courts/supreme/a-134-99.opn.html)
- State v. Koskovich (http://njlaw.rutgers.edu/collections/courts/supreme/a-134-99.opn.html)
- Zacarias v. Allstate Insurance Company (http://njlaw.rutgers.edu/collections/courts/supreme/a-1-00.opn.html)
- State v. DeLuca (http://njlaw.rutgers.edu/collections/courts/supreme/a-82-99.opn.html)
- State v. Johnson (http://njlaw.rutgers.edu/collections/courts/supreme/a-132-99.opn.html)
- IMO Petition of American Water for Rate Increase (http://njlaw.rutgers.edu/collections/courts/supreme/a-32-00.opn.html)
- State v. Sullivan (http://njlaw.rutgers.edu/collections/courts/supreme/a-10-00.opn.html)
- State v. Ravatto (http://njlaw.rutgers.edu/collections/courts/supreme/a-45-00.opn.html)

=== 2001-2002 term ===
- Campbell v. New Jersey Racing Commission (http://njlaw.rutgers.edu/collections/courts/supreme/a-70-00.opn.html)
- Harleysville Insurance v. Garitta (http://njlaw.rutgers.edu/collections/courts/supreme/a-72-00.opn.html)
- Amoresano v. Laufgas (http://njlaw.rutgers.edu/collections/courts/supreme/a-64-00.opn.html)
- Clymer v. Summit Bancorp. (http://njlaw.rutgers.edu/collections/courts/supreme/a-74-00.opn.html)
- State v. Stott (http://njlaw.rutgers.edu/collections/courts/supreme/a-88-00.opn.html)
- In the Interest of J.D.H. (http://njlaw.rutgers.edu/collections/courts/supreme/a-96-00.opn.html)
- First Resolution v. Seker (http://njlaw.rutgers.edu/collections/courts/supreme/a-116-00_1.doc.html)
- State v. Carreker (http://njlaw.rutgers.edu/collections/courts/supreme/a-95-00.opn.html)
- State v. Rodriguez (http://njlaw.rutgers.edu/collections/courts/supreme/a-19-01.opn.html)
- Musikoff v. Jay Parrino’s The Mint (http://njlaw.rutgers.edu/collections/courts/supreme/a-39-01.opn.html)
- Wade v. Kessler Institute (http://njlaw.rutgers.edu/collections/courts/supreme/a-62-01.opn.html)
- In re P.S.E. & G. Shareholder Litigation (http://njlaw.rutgers.edu/collections/courts/supreme/a-41-01.opn.html)
- Shepherd v. Hunterdon Developmental Center (http://njlaw.rutgers.edu/collections/courts/supreme/a-14-01.opn.html)
- State v. DiFrisco (http://njlaw.rutgers.edu/collections/courts/supreme/a-30-01.opn.html)

=== 2002-2003 term ===
- State v. Mendez (http://njlaw.rutgers.edu/collections/courts/supreme/a-30-01.opn.html)
- State v. Brooks (http://njlaw.rutgers.edu/collections/courts/supreme/a-69-01.opn.html)
- State v. Simbara (http://njlaw.rutgers.edu/collections/courts/supreme/a-110-01.opn.html)
- State v. Harvey (http://njlaw.rutgers.edu/collections/courts/supreme/a-89-01.opn.html)
- Leodori v. Cigna (http://njlaw.rutgers.edu/collections/courts/supreme/a-120-01.opn.html)
- State v. Nishina (http://njlaw.rutgers.edu/collections/courts/supreme/a-135-01.opn.html)
- A.B. and S.B.W. v. S.E.W. (http://njlaw.rutgers.edu/collections/courts/supreme/a-155-01.opn.html)
- Flanigan v. Munson (http://njlaw.rutgers.edu/collections/courts/supreme/a-21-02.opn.html)
- Mull v. Zeta Consumer Products (http://njlaw.rutgers.edu/collections/courts/supreme/a-3-02.opn.html)
- State v. David Summers (http://njlaw.rutgers.edu/collections/courts/supreme/a-1-02.opn.html)
- State v. Holland (http://njlaw.rutgers.edu/collections/courts/supreme/a-150-01.opn.html)
- Joye v. Hunterdon Central (http://njlaw.rutgers.edu/collections/courts/supreme/a-27-02.opn.html)
- First American v. Lawson (http://njlaw.rutgers.edu/collections/courts/supreme/a-13-02.opn.html)
- State v. Perez (http://njlaw.rutgers.edu/collections/courts/supreme/a-131-01.opn.html)
- State v. Sisler (http://njlaw.rutgers.edu/collections/courts/supreme/a-39-02.opn.html)

=== 2003-2004 term ===
- State v. A.G.D. (http://njlaw.rutgers.edu/collections/courts/supreme/a-11-02.opn.html)
- State v. Wilson (http://njlaw.rutgers.edu/collections/courts/supreme/a-49-02.opn.html)
- Jaquez v. National Continental Ins. Co. (http://njlaw.rutgers.edu/collections/courts/supreme/a-74-02.opn.html)
- State v. Golotta (http://njlaw.rutgers.edu/collections/courts/supreme/a-78-02.opn.html)
- Vassiliu v. Daimler Chrysler (http://njlaw.rutgers.edu/collections/courts/supreme/a-63-02.opn.html)
- State v. Milne (http://njlaw.rutgers.edu/collections/courts/supreme/a-61-02.opn.html)
- Buono v. Scalia (http://njlaw.rutgers.edu/collections/courts/supreme/a-101-02.opn.html)
- State in the Interest of Q.N. (http://njlaw.rutgers.edu/collections/courts/supreme/a-106-02.opn.html)
- Borteck v. Riker, Danzig (http://njlaw.rutgers.edu/collections/courts/supreme/a-31-03.opn.html)
- Mancini v. Township of Teaneck (http://njlaw.rutgers.edu/collections/courts/supreme/a-18-03.opn.html)
- State in the Interest of G.C. (http://njlaw.rutgers.edu/collections/courts/supreme/a-7-03.opn.html)
- Island Venture Associates v. NJDEP (http://njlaw.rutgers.edu/collections/courts/supreme/a-20-03.opn.html)
- Comparato v. Schait (http://njlaw.rutgers.edu/collections/courts/supreme/a-43-03.opn.html)
- State v. Diloreto (http://njlaw.rutgers.edu/collections/courts/supreme/a-47-03.opn.html)

Political offices
Preceded by Judy Shaw	Chief of Staff to the Governor of New Jersey; 1995–1996	Succeeded by Harriet E. Derman
Legal offices
Preceded by Deborah T. Poritz	Attorney General of New Jersey; 1996–1999	Succeeded by John Farmer Jr.
