= Magyar Bank =

Magyar Bancorp, Inc.
- Company type: Public
- Traded as: Nasdaq: MGYR
- Industry: Finance
- Founded: 1922; 104 years ago
- Headquarters: New Brunswick, New Jersey, U.S.
- Key people: John Fitzgerald (president & CEO)
- Products: Financial services
- Parent: Magyar Bancorp
- Website: magbank.com

Magyar Bank is a bank based in New Brunswick, New Jersey with branches in Central Jersey.

The bank was founded in 1922 as the Magyar Building and Loan Association by a group of Hungarian immigrants and businessmen in New Brunswick, many of whom had settled in the city's Fifth Ward. ("Magyar" is the Hungarian-language word for Hungarian peoples and language). In 1954, its charter was amended and the name changed to Magyar Savings & Loan Association. In 1989 it became Magyar Savings Bank, SLA and in 2005 Magyar Bank.

In January 2006 Magyar Bancorp, parent company of Magyar Bank, began trading on the NASDAQ stock market under the symbol MGYR. The MagyarBank Charitable Foundation, 501(c) organization, was established in June 2006.

== See also ==
- Thomas Lankey
