= New Jersey's 18th legislative district =

American legislative district

- Senator: Patrick J. Diegnan (D)
- Assembly members: Robert Karabinchak (D); Sterley Stanley (D)
- Registration: 42.75% Democratic; 18.40% Republican; 37.84% unaffiliated
- Demographics: 43.5% White; 7.1% Black/African American; 0.4% Native American; 35.9% Asian; 0.0% Hawaiian/Pacific Islander; 5.8% Other race; 7.2% Two or more races; 12.3% Hispanic
- Population: 230,335
- Voting-age population: 179,252
- Registered voters: 158,255

New Jersey's 18th legislative district is one of 40 in the New Jersey Legislature. The district includes the Middlesex County municipalities of East Brunswick Township, Edison Township, Milltown, Highland Park Borough, Metuchen Borough, South Plainfield Borough and South River Borough.

== Demographic characteristics ==
As of the 2020 United States census, the district had a population of 230,335, of whom 179,252 (77.8%) were of voting age. The racial makeup of the district was 100,171 (43.5%) White, 16,317 (7.1%) African American, 866 (0.4%) Native American, 82,803 (35.9%) Asian, 85 (0.0%) Pacific Islander, 13,413 (5.8%) from some other race, and 16,680 (7.2%) from two or more races. Hispanic or Latino of any race were 28,325 (12.3%) of the population.

The district had 158,255 registered voters as of December 1, 2021, of whom 59,460 (37.6%) were registered as unaffiliated, 70,920 (44.8%) were registered as Democrats, 26,137 (16.5%) were registered as Republicans, and 1,738 (1.1%) were registered to other parties.

The district had the highest percentage of Asian American residents of any district statewide, with African American, Hispanic, and elderly below statewide averages. Registered Democrats outnumbered Republicans by a better than 2 to 1 margin.

== Political representation ==
For the 2026–2027 session, the 18th legislative district of the New Jersey Legislature is represented in the State Senate by Patrick J. Diegnan (D, South Plainfield) and in the General Assembly by Robert Karabinchak (D, Edison) and Sterley Stanley (D, East Brunswick).

The legislative district overlaps with New Jersey's 6th and 12th congressional districts.

== Apportionment history ==
Since the creation of the 40-district legislative map in 1973, the 18th district has always been centered around central Middlesex County and has always included East Brunswick, Edison, and Metuchen in every decennial redistricting. In addition to those three municipalities, the 1973 version of the district included South Brunswick, North Brunswick, Helmetta, Spotswood, Milltown, and South River. For the 1981 redistricting, South Brunswick and South River were shifted to other districts but the 18th picked up Monroe Township and Jamesburg. Under the 1991 redistricting, Monroe, Jamesburg, Helmetta, and Spotswood were removed, but South River was restored to the district. For the 2001 redistricting, South Plainfield was added to the district for the first time, Spotswood and Helmetta returned to the district, and North Brunswick and Milltown were shifted to the 17th district.

In May 1991, five-term incumbent Frank M. Pelly was named by Governor James Florio to serve as executive director of the New Jersey Lottery, after Pelly announced that he would not be seeking re-election. In the 1991 Republican landslide, Jack Sinagra took the Senate seat vacated by Democrat Thomas H. Paterniti, while in the Assembly race, Harriet E. Derman and running mate Jeffrey A. Warsh were elected, knocking off Democratic incumbent George A. Spadoro and his running mate Michael J. Baker. Derman and Warsh won re-election in 1993, defeating former Assemblymember Thomas H. Paterniti and his running mate Matthew Vaughn.

After Christine Todd Whitman became governor in 1994, she named Derman to head the Department of Community Affairs. Republican Joanna Gregory-Scocchi was chosen by a Republican special convention to fill Derman's vacancy. In a November 1994 special election, early favorite Gregory-Scocchi was defeated by Barbara Buono, after disclosures that Gregory-Scocchi's temporary employment firm had hired illegal immigrants.

In the 1995 elections, the Assembly seats swung back to the Democrats, with Barbara Buono holding onto her seat and her running mate Peter J. Barnes Jr. winning too, defeating Republican incumbent Warsh and his running mate Jane Tousman, despite Republicans outspending the Democrats by a 2-1 margin in the bitterly fought battleground district.

In May 2001, Sinagra announced that he would not run for a fourth term, leaving Barbara Buono as the favorite to pick up the seat for the Democrats. Buono went on to win the Senate seat, and in the Assembly, Barnes Jr. won re-election together with running mate Patrick J. Diegnan, leaving all three legislative seats controlled by Democrats for the first time since 1991. Sinagra resigned from the Senate shortly before the election to become a Port Authority of New York and New Jersey commissioner; North Brunswick Township's attorney David Himelman was appointed after the election to fill the remaining weeks of Sinagra's term.

In March 2007, after Barnes Jr. was confirmed to a seat on the New Jersey State Parole Board, his son Peter J. Barnes III was chosen to fill his vacant seat in the Assembly by a convention of Democratic party delegates. Changes to the district made as part of the New Jersey Legislative redistricting in 2011, based on the results of the 2010 United States census, removed Spotswood Borough (to the 14th legislative district) and added Highland Park (from the 17th legislative district).

In the November 2013 gubernatorial election, Barbara Buono chose not to run for re-election, choosing instead to mount an unsuccessful challenge to Chris Christie's bid for re-election as Governor of New Jersey. In the 18th district, Peter J. Barnes III moved from the Assembly to the Senate, winning Buono's seat against East Brunswick mayor David Stahl in a close race. Barnes's seat in the Assembly was won by East Brunswick Township Councilmember Nancy Pinkin.

Upon his appointment to the State Superior Court, Barnes resigned his Senate seat on April 25, 2016. On May 5, Diegnan was selected without opposition to receive an appointment to the Senate seat by the members of the Middlesex County Democratic Organization. A week later, on May 12, Edison Councilman Robert Karabinchak was selected from a ballot of four candidates to receive appointment to Diegnan's Assembly seat. Special elections held on November 8, 2016 elected Diegnan and Karabinchak to serve out the remainder of the terms in their seats. Pinkin would be elected to the position of Middlesex County Clerk in November 2020, and would resign her seat on December 31 to take the county office. Democratic committee members in Middlesex County selected East Brunswick Council President Sterley Stanley as her replacement by a 189–136 margin over Edison Council member Joe Coyle on January 12, 2021; he was sworn in on January 27.

== Election history ==
Session	Senate	General Assembly	
1974–1975	Bernard J. Dwyer (D)	James Bornheimer (D)	John H. Froude (D)
1976–1977	Bernard J. Dwyer (D)	James Bornheimer (D)	John H. Froude (D)
1978–1979	Bernard J. Dwyer (D) (Note: Resigned January 3, 1981 upon his election to Congress)	James Bornheimer (D)	John H. Froude (D)
1980–1981	Bernard J. Dwyer (D)	James Bornheimer (D)	Thomas H. Paterniti (D)
1980–1981	Seat vacant (Note: Dwyer's seat remained vacant for the remainder of the session)	James Bornheimer (D)	Thomas H. Paterniti (D)
1982–1983	James Bornheimer (D)	Frank M. Pelly (D)	Thomas H. Paterniti (D)
1984–1985	Peter P. Garibaldi (R)	Frank M. Pelly (D)	Thomas H. Paterniti (D)
1986–1987	Peter P. Garibaldi (R)	Frank M. Pelly (D)	Thomas H. Paterniti (D)
1988–1989	Thomas H. Paterniti (D)	Frank M. Pelly (D)	George A. Spadoro (D)
1990–1991	Thomas H. Paterniti (D)	Frank M. Pelly (D) (Note: Resigned July 1, 1991 to become executive director of the New Jersey Lottery)	George A. Spadoro (D)
1990–1991	Thomas H. Paterniti (D)	Michael J. Baker (D) (Note: Appointed to the Assembly on July 15, 1991)	George A. Spadoro (D)
1992–1993	Jack Sinagra (R)	Jeffrey A. Warsh (R)	Harriet E. Derman (R)
1994–1995	Jack Sinagra (R)	Jeffrey A. Warsh (R)	Harriet E. Derman (R) (Note: Resigned February 8, 1994 to become director of Department of Community Affairs)
1994–1995	Jack Sinagra (R)	Jeffrey A. Warsh (R)	Joanna Gregory-Scocchi (R) (Note: Appointed to the Assembly on February 8, 1994, defeated in November 1994 special election)
1994–1995	Jack Sinagra (R)	Jeffrey A. Warsh (R)	Barbara Buono (D) (Note: Elected in November 1994 special election, sworn in on December 1, 1994)
1996–1997	Jack Sinagra (R)	Peter J. Barnes Jr. (D)	Barbara Buono (D)
1998–1999	Jack Sinagra (R) (Note: Resigned October 23, 2001 to become a Port Authority of New York and New Jersey commissioner)	Peter J. Barnes Jr. (D)	Barbara Buono (D)
2000–2001	Jack Sinagra (R)	Peter J. Barnes Jr. (D)	Barbara Buono (D)
2000–2001	David Himelman (R) (Note: Appointed to the Senate on November 26, 2001)	Peter J. Barnes Jr. (D)	Barbara Buono (D)
2002–2003	Barbara Buono (D)	Peter J. Barnes Jr. (D)	Patrick J. Diegnan (D)
2004–2005	Barbara Buono (D)	Peter J. Barnes Jr. (D)	Patrick J. Diegnan (D)
2006–2007	Barbara Buono (D)	Peter J. Barnes Jr. (D) (Note: Resigned March 14, 2007 to become chairman of the State Parole Board)	Patrick J. Diegnan (D)
2006–2007	Barbara Buono (D)	Peter J. Barnes III (D) (Note: Appointed to the Assembly on March 15, 2007)	Patrick J. Diegnan (D)
2008–2009	Barbara Buono (D)	Peter J. Barnes III (D)	Patrick J. Diegnan (D)
2010–2011	Barbara Buono (D)	Peter J. Barnes III (D)	Patrick J. Diegnan (D)
2012–2013	Barbara Buono (D)	Peter J. Barnes III (D)	Patrick J. Diegnan (D)
2014–2015	Peter J. Barnes III (D) (Note: Resigned April 25, 2016 to become a Superior Court judge)	Nancy Pinkin (D)	Patrick J. Diegnan (D)
2016–2017	Peter J. Barnes III (D)	Nancy Pinkin (D)	Patrick J. Diegnan (D) (Note: Appointed to the Senate on May 9, 2016, won November 8, 2016 special election to complete the term)
2016–2017	Patrick J. Diegnan (D)	Nancy Pinkin (D)	Robert Karabinchak (D) (Note: Appointed to the Assembly on May 26, 2016, won November 8, 2016 special election to complete the term)
2018–2019	Patrick J. Diegnan (D)	Nancy Pinkin (D)	Robert Karabinchak (D)
2020–2021	Patrick J. Diegnan (D)	Nancy Pinkin (D) (Note: Resigned December 31, 2020 to become Middlesex County Clerk)	Robert Karabinchak (D)
2020–2021	Patrick J. Diegnan (D)	Sterley Stanley (D) (Note: Appointed to the Assembly on January 27, 2021)	Robert Karabinchak (D)
2022–2023	Patrick J. Diegnan (D)	Sterley Stanley (D)	Robert Karabinchak (D)
2024–2025	Patrick J. Diegnan (D)	Sterley Stanley (D)	Robert Karabinchak (D)
2026–2027	Patrick J. Diegnan (D)	Sterley Stanley (D)	Robert Karabinchak (D)

== Election results ==
=== Senate ===
2021 New Jersey general election
Party	Candidate	Votes	%	±%
Democratic	Patrick J. Diegnan Jr.	35,637	60.6	▼5.0
Republican	Vihal R. Patel	23,144	39.4	▲5.0
Total votes		58,781	100.0	

New Jersey general election, 2017
Party	Candidate	Votes	%	±%
Democratic	Patrick J. Diegnan Jr.	32,175	65.6	▲3.9
Republican	Lewis Glogower	16,860	34.4	▼3.9
Total votes		49,035	100.0	

Special election, November 8, 2016
Party	Candidate	Votes	%	±%
Democratic	Patrick J. Diegnan Jr.	50,537	61.7	▲9.8
Republican	Roger W. Daley	31,321	38.3	▼9.8
Total votes		81,858	100.0	

New Jersey general election, 2013
Party	Candidate	Votes	%	±%
Democratic	Peter Barnes	25,063	51.9	▼8.2
Republican	David Stahl	23,184	48.1	▲8.2
Total votes		48,247	100.0	

2011 New Jersey general election
Party	Candidate	Votes	%
Democratic	Barbara Buono	19,631	60.1
Republican	Gloria S. Dittman	13,042	39.9
Total votes		32,673	100.0

2007 New Jersey general election
Party	Candidate	Votes	%	±%
Democratic	Barbara Buono	21,365	62.4	▲3.9
Republican	Daniel H. Brown	12,896	37.6	▼3.9
Total votes		34,261	100.0	

2003 New Jersey general election
Party	Candidate	Votes	%	±%
Democratic	Barbara Buono	18,561	58.5	▼6.5
Republican	Richard F. Plechner	13,175	41.5	▲6.5
Total votes		31,736	100.0	

2001 New Jersey general election
Party	Candidate	Votes	%
Democratic	Barbara Buono	33,487	65.0
Republican	John G. Cito	18,064	35.0
Total votes		51,551	100.0

1997 New Jersey general election
Party	Candidate	Votes	%	±%
Republican	Jack G. Sinagra	35,400	58.5	▲0.3
Democratic	Thomas H. Paterniti	25,110	41.5	▲1.7
Total votes		60,510	100.0	

1993 New Jersey general election
Party	Candidate	Votes	%	±%
Republican	Jack Sinagra	36,736	58.2	▲4.7
Democratic	Samuel V. Convery, Jr.	25,106	39.8	▼6.7
Voter's Independence Coalition	Kevin Michael Criss	1,261	2.0	N/A
Total votes		63,103	100.0	

1991 New Jersey general election
Party	Candidate	Votes	%
Republican	Jack Sinagra	28,638	53.5
Democratic	Harry S. Pozycki	24,889	46.5
Total votes		53,527	100.0

1987 New Jersey general election
Party	Candidate	Votes	%	±%
Democratic	Thomas H. Paterniti	30,790	59.2	▲12.5
Republican	Peter P. Garibaldi	21,253	40.8	▼7.1
Total votes		52,043	100.0	

1983 New Jersey general election
Party	Candidate	Votes	%	±%
Republican	Peter P. Garibaldi	24,397	47.9	0.0
Democratic	James W. Bornheimer	23,814	46.7	▼5.4
Independent	Robert S. Maurer	2,769	5.4	N/A
Total votes		50,980	100.0	

1981 New Jersey general election
Party	Candidate	Votes	%
Democratic	James Bornheimer	31,383	52.1
Republican	Peter P. Garibaldi	28,853	47.9
Total votes		60,236	100.0

1977 New Jersey general election
Party	Candidate	Votes	%	±%
Democratic	Bernard J. Dwyer	34,144	57.6	▼5.6
Republican	S. Elliott Mayo	23,803	40.2	▲3.4
Independent	Edward R. Gavarny	1,281	2.2	N/A
Total votes		59,228	100.0	

1973 New Jersey general election
Party	Candidate	Votes	%
Democratic	Bernard J. Dwyer	36,606	63.2
Republican	Fuller H. Brooks	21,301	36.8
Total votes		57,907	100.0

=== General Assembly ===
2021 New Jersey general election
Party	Candidate	Votes	%	±%
Democratic	Robert Karabinchak	33,685	29.3	▼0.4
Democratic	Sterley Stanley	32,743	28.5	▼2.3
Republican	Melanie McCann Mott	23,940	20.8	▲0.6
Republican	Angela Fam	23,248	20.2	▲1.0
Libertarian	David Awad	741	0.6	N/A
An Inspired Advocate	Brian P. Kulas	729	0.6	N/A
Total votes		115,086	100.0	

2019 New Jersey general election
Party	Candidate	Votes	%	±%
Democratic	Nancy Pinkin	20,347	30.8	▼1.2
Democratic	Robert Karabinchak	19,597	29.7	▼1.3
Republican	Robert A. Bengivenga Jr.	13,362	20.2	▲1.7
Republican	Jeffrey R. Brown	12,690	19.2	▲1.8
Total votes		65,996	100.0	

New Jersey general election, 2017
Party	Candidate	Votes	%	±%
Democratic	Nancy J. Pinkin	30,301	32.0	▲0.4
Democratic	Robert J. Karabinchak	29,376	31.0	▼0.9
Republican	April Bengivenga	17,559	18.5	0.0
Republican	Zhiyu "Jimmy" Hu	16,484	17.4	▼0.5
Green	Sean A. Stratton	1,024	1.1	N/A
Total votes		94,744	100.0	

Special election, November 8, 2016
Party	Candidate	Votes	%
Democratic	Robert Karabinchak	48,513	60.4
Republican	Camille Ferraro Clark	31,827	39.6
Total votes		80,340	100.0

New Jersey general election, 2015
Party	Candidate	Votes	%	±%
Democratic	Patrick J. Diegnan Jr.	16,256	31.9	▲4.8
Democratic	Nancy Pinkin	16,113	31.6	▲5.4
Republican	Teresa Rose Hutchison	9,432	18.5	▼4.8
Republican	Synnove Bakke	9,123	17.9	▼4.4
Total votes		50,924	100.0	

New Jersey general election, 2013
Party	Candidate	Votes	%	±%
Democratic	Patrick J. Diegnan Jr.	24,996	27.1	▼1.3
Democratic	Nancy Pinkin	24,186	26.2	▼2.4
Republican	Robert A. Bengivenga Jr.	21,517	23.3	▲1.3
Republican	Lisa Goldhammer	20,559	22.3	▲1.3
United We Stand	Sheila Angalet	1,068	1.2	N/A
Total votes		92,326	100.0	

New Jersey general election, 2011
Party	Candidate	Votes	%
Democratic	Peter J. Barnes, III	18,166	28.6
Democratic	Patrick J. Diegnan, Jr.	18,050	28.4
Republican	Joseph Sinagra	13,996	22.0
Republican	Marcia Silva	13,333	21.0
Total votes		63,545	100.0

New Jersey general election, 2009
Party	Candidate	Votes	%	±%
Democratic	Peter J. Barnes	26,658	25.9	▼2.5
Democratic	Patrick J. Diegnan, Jr	26,317	25.6	▼3.2
Republican	Joseph Sinagra	24,091	23.4	▲1.8
Republican	Robert Jones	22,727	22.1	▲0.9
Defending Forgotten Taxpayers	Katherine Shkolar	1,671	1.6	N/A
Defending Forgotten Taxpayers	Andrew Tidd	1,351	1.3	N/A
Total votes		102,815	100.0	

New Jersey general election, 2007
Party	Candidate	Votes	%	±%
Democratic	Patrick J. Diegnan Jr	18,858	28.8	▼0.3
Democratic	Peter J. Barnes III	18,621	28.4	▼2.4
Republican	Joseph Sinagra	14,121	21.6	▲1.5
Republican	William England	13,921	21.2	▲1.2
Total votes		65,521	100.0	

New Jersey general election, 2005
Party	Candidate	Votes	%	±%
Democratic	Peter J. Barnes Jr	31,605	30.8	▲1.2
Democratic	Patrick J. Diegnan Jr	29,874	29.1	▲2.4
Republican	Daniel Epstein	20,639	20.1	▼2.9
Republican	Frank J. Coury	20,530	20.0	▼0.7
Total votes		102,648	100.0	

New Jersey general election, 2003
Party	Candidate	Votes	%	±%
Democratic	Peter J. Barnes Jr	18,032	29.6	▼3.4
Democratic	Patrick J. Diegnan Jr	16,255	26.7	▼4.4
Republican	Robert D. Thuring	13,994	23.0	▲4.7
Republican	Jasal Amin	12,636	20.7	▲3.1
Total votes		60,917	100.0	

New Jersey general election, 2001
Party	Candidate	Votes	%
Democratic	Peter J. Barnes Jr	32,633	33.0
Democratic	Patrick Diegnan Jr	30,759	31.1
Republican	Norman J. Van Houten	18,152	18.3
Republican	Sylvester Fernandez	17,443	17.6
Total votes		98,987	100.0

New Jersey general election, 1999
Party	Candidate	Votes	%	±%
Democratic	Barbara Buono	19,327	31.7	▲3.1
Democratic	Peter J. Barnes, Jr.	18,068	29.7	▲2.4
Republican	E. Martin Davidoff	11,853	19.5	▼2.6
Republican	Norman Van Houten	11,632	19.1	▼2.9
Total votes		60,880	100.0	

New Jersey general election, 1997
Party	Candidate	Votes	%	±%
Democratic	Barbara Buono	33,248	28.6	▲2.0
Democratic	Peter J. Barnes, Jr.	31,781	27.3	▲2.0
Republican	Wendy L. Wiebalk	25,729	22.1	▼1.2
Republican	Thomas J. Toto	25,612	22.0	▲0.2
Total votes		116,370	100.0	

New Jersey general election, 1995
Party	Candidate	Votes	%	±%
Democratic	Barbara A. Buono	20,530	26.6	▲5.2
Democratic	Peter J. Barnes, Jr.	19,531	25.3	▲4.9
Republican	Jeff Warsh	17,941	23.3	▼5.0
Republican	L. Jane Tousman	16,790	21.8	▼8.1
Individuals Count	Frank J. Coury	2,351	3.0	N/A
Total votes		77,143	100.0	

Special election, November 8, 1994
Party	Candidate	Votes	%
Democratic	Barbara Buono	27,229	53.7
Republican	Joanna Gregory-Scocchi	23,436	46.3
Total votes		50,665	100.0

New Jersey general election, 1993
Party	Candidate	Votes	%	±%
Republican	Harriet Derman	36,358	29.9	▲0.3
Republican	Jeff Warsh	34,491	28.3	▼0.1
Democratic	Thomas H. Paterniti	26,029	21.4	▲0.2
Democratic	Matthew Vaughn	24,883	20.4	▼0.4
Total votes		121,761	100.0	

1991 New Jersey general election
Party	Candidate	Votes	%
Republican	Harriet Derman	30,946	29.6
Republican	Jeff Warsh	29,631	28.4
Democratic	George A. Spadoro	22,132	21.2
Democratic	Michael Baker	21,674	20.8
Total votes		104,383	100.0

1989 New Jersey general election
Party	Candidate	Votes	%	±%
Democratic	Frank M. Pelly	39,017	30.3	▲0.1
Democratic	George A. Spadoro	38,443	29.9	▲1.1
Republican	Cheryl Ann Rickards	25,933	20.2	▼0.8
Republican	Charles Eibeler	25,181	19.6	▼0.3
Total votes		128,574	100.0	

1987 New Jersey general election
Party	Candidate	Votes	%	±%
Democratic	Frank M. Pelly	30,634	30.2	▲4.1
Democratic	George A. Spadoro	29,261	28.8	▲2.1
Republican	Robert “Dr. Bob” Maurer	21,332	21.0	▼3.0
Republican	Doris M. Fleming	20,234	19.9	▼3.3
Total votes		101,461	100.0	

1985 New Jersey general election
Party	Candidate	Votes	%	±%
Democratic	Thomas H. Paterniti	30,169	26.7	▼1.8
Democratic	Frank M. Pelly	29,490	26.1	▼2.2
Republican	S. Elliott Mayo	27,101	24.0	▲2.1
Republican	Michael Leibowitz	26,280	23.2	▲1.9
Total votes		113,040	100.0	

New Jersey general election, 1983
Party	Candidate	Votes	%	±%
Democratic	Thomas H. Paterniti	27,741	28.5	▲0.2
Democratic	Frank M. Pelly	27,555	28.3	▲0.9
Republican	Doris M. Fleming	21,292	21.9	▼0.8
Republican	Donna R. Bowen	20,759	21.3	▼0.3
Total votes		97,347	100.0	

New Jersey general election, 1981
Party	Candidate	Votes	%
Democratic	Thomas H. Paterniti	33,295	28.3
Democratic	Frank M. Pelly	32,271	27.4
Republican	Barbara S. Abbott	26,731	22.7
Republican	Bertram Buckler	25,437	21.6
Total votes		117,734	100.0

New Jersey general election, 1979
Party	Candidate	Votes	%	±%
Democratic	James Bornheimer	29,829	31.9	▲0.8
Democratic	Thomas H. Paterniti	28,346	30.3	▲0.6
Republican	James R. Sheldon	17,974	19.2	▼0.5
Republican	Elias L. Schneider	17,264	18.5	▼1.0
Total votes		93,413	100.0	

New Jersey general election, 1977
Party	Candidate	Votes	%	±%
Democratic	James W. Bornheimer	35,683	31.1	▼0.2
Democratic	John H. Froude	34,119	29.7	▼0.7
Republican	Donald R. Appleby	22,661	19.7	▼0.9
Republican	Glenn Berman	22,359	19.5	▲1.8
Total votes		114,822	100.0	

New Jersey general election, 1975
Party	Candidate	Votes	%	±%
Democratic	James W. Bornheimer	32,149	31.3	▼1.4
Democratic	John H. Froude	31,248	30.4	▼2.0
Republican	S. Elliott Mayo	21,224	20.6	▲3.1
Republican	Daumants Hazners	18,239	17.7	▲0.7
Total votes		102,860	100.0	

New Jersey general election, 1973
Party	Candidate	Votes	%
Democratic	James W. Bornheimer	37,384	32.7
Democratic	John H. Froude	37,046	32.4
Republican	James Genecki	20,051	17.5
Republican	George W. Luke	19,487	17.0
American	Arthur M. Balogh	225	0.2
American	Oris A. Thompson	205	0.2
Total votes		114,398	100.0
