= John H. Froude =

American politician

Member of the New Jersey General Assembly
- In office January 8, 1974 – January 8, 1980
- Preceded by: Martin E. Kravarik; Donald Macrae
- Succeeded by: Thomas H. Paterniti
- Constituency: District 7B (1972–1974); 18th district (1974–1980)

Personal details
- Born: February 1, 1930 (age 96) South Amboy, New Jersey
- Party: Democratic

John H. Froude (born February 1, 1930) is an American Democratic Party politician who served in the New Jersey General Assembly from 1972 to 1980.

He grew up in South River and attended public schools there. He graduated from South River High School. earned an Ed.M from Rutgers University and took additional courses at Seton Hall University and the University of Michigan. He worked as a college professor at Kean College and as a social studies teacher at South River High School and Sayreville War Memorial High School. He was elected to the South River borough council in 1967 and reelected in 1970 before being elected to the Assembly.

First elected in 1971 to the Assembly from District 7B (alongside James Bornheimer), he was reelected in 1973, 1975, and 1977 in the new 18th Legislative District. He retired from the Assembly in 1980 and moved to Upper Freehold Township.
