= Bernard J. Dwyer =

American politician

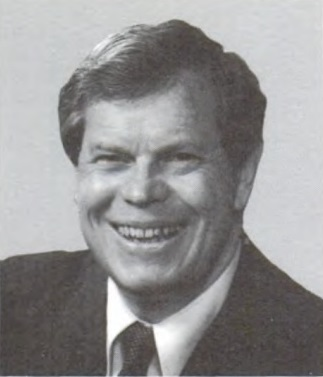

Member of the U.S. House of Representatives from New Jersey
- In office January 3, 1981 – January 3, 1993
- Preceded by: Edward J. Patten
- Succeeded by: Frank Pallone
- Constituency: 15th district (1981–1983); 6th district (1983–1993)

Member of the New Jersey Senate from the 18th district
- In office 1974–1980
- Preceded by: District created
- Succeeded by: James Bornheimer

Mayor of Edison
- In office 1970–1974
- Preceded by: Anthony Yelencsics
- Succeeded by: Thomas H. Paterniti

Personal details
- Born: Bernard James Dwyer; January 24, 1921 Perth Amboy, New Jersey, U.S.
- Died: October 31, 1998 (aged 77) Edison, New Jersey, U.S.
- Party: Democratic
- Spouse: Lilyan Sudzina
- Children: 1
- Education: Rutgers University–Newark (attended)

Military service
- Allegiance: United States
- Branch/service: United States Navy
- Years of service: 1940–1945
- Battles/wars: World War II

Bernard James Dwyer (January 24, 1921 – October 31, 1998) was an American politician who served as a United States representative from New Jersey from 1981 to 1993.

== Early life and education ==
Dwyer was born in Perth Amboy, Middlesex County, New Jersey, to Daniel F. and Alice (Zehrer) Dwyer. A Roman Catholic, he attended public schools, graduating from Perth Amboy High School in 1938. He attended Rutgers University–Newark, but did not earn a degree. He served in the United States Navy during World War II (1940–1945).

== Career ==
Dwyer was an insurance broker by profession. His political career began when he successfully ran for a seat on the Edison, New Jersey city council, serving 1958–1969. He was elected Mayor of Edison, New Jersey in 1969, serving a single term from 1970 to 1973. Dwyer served as a member of the New Jersey Senate, where he represented the New Jersey's 18th legislative district from 1974 to 1980.

He was elected to the United States House of Representatives, and served six terms (January 3, 1981 – January 3, 1993). He represented New Jersey's 15th congressional district during his first term, but redistricting after the 1980 Census, shifted him to the 6th district.

Dwyer was the last member of Congress who was also a survivor of the Japanese Attack on Pearl Harbor, when he retired in 1992.

Dwyer did not seek reelection in 1992, and retired in 1993. Redistricting after the 1990 Census had merged his district with that of fellow Democrat Frank Pallone.

Dwyer's congressional papers are stored at the Rutgers University Libraries, Special Collections and University Archives in New Brunswick, New Jersey. They include congressional office files consisting chiefly of documentation accumulated while he was a member of the United States House Committee on Appropriations.

== Personal life ==
He married Lilyan Sudzina in 1944. They had one daughter, Pamela Dwyer Stockton.

A resident of Metuchen, New Jersey, Dwyer died at John F. Kennedy Medical Center in Edison, New Jersey on October 31, 1998, of a heart attack. He was buried at St. Gertrude's Cemetery in Colonia, New Jersey.

U.S. House of Representatives
Preceded by Edward J. Patten	Member of the U.S. House of Representatives from New Jersey's 15th congressional district 1981–1983	Succeeded by District eliminated
Preceded by Edwin B. Forsythe	Member of the U.S. House of Representatives from New Jersey's 6th congressional district 1983–1993	Succeeded by Frank Pallone
