= Peter P. Garibaldi =

American politician (1931–2023)

Member of the New Jersey Senate from the 18th district
- In office January 10, 1984 – January 12, 1988
- Preceded by: James Bornheimer
- Succeeded by: Thomas H. Paterniti

Mayor of Monroe Township
- In office 1976–1988
- Preceded by: Joseph Indyk
- Succeeded by: Richard Pucci

Member of the New Jersey General Assembly from the 7A district
- In office January 9, 1968 – January 8, 1974 Serving with Richard A. Olsen (1968–1970), Robert K. Haelig (1970–1972) and William J. Hamilton (1972–1974)
- Preceded by: District created
- Succeeded by: District abolished

Member of the Monroe Township Committee
- In office 1964–1967
- Succeeded by: George Allen

Personal details
- Born: September 12, 1931 New Brunswick, New Jersey, U.S.
- Died: August 20, 2023 (aged 91) Neptune Township, New Jersey, U.S.
- Party: Republican
- Spouse: Lynne
- Children: 7

Peter P. Garibaldi (September 12, 1931 – August 20, 2023) was an American tradesman, accountant, military officer, and Republican politician who served in the New Jersey General Assembly from 1968 to 1974 and in the New Jersey Senate from 1984 to 1988. His personal popularity and reputation as a political maverick led him to win multiple elections in Democratic territory; his victory in the 1983 New Jersey Senate election was the first for a Republican in Middlesex County in 54 years. He ran unsuccessfully as the Republican nominee for United States House of Representatives in 1970 and 1972.

== Early life ==
Garibaldi was born on September 13, 1931 in New Brunswick, New Jersey. His father was a stonemason. Garibaldi attended Rutgers University and Rider College.

Prior to entering politics, Garibaldi was a union bricklayer and piloted fighter jets as a captain in the United States Air Force. He later became an accountant.

== Political career ==
=== Early political career ===
Garibaldi entered politics in 1963, when he won a seat on the Monroe Township Committee, defeating Democratic candidate Anthony Alesi by only about forty votes. At the time, Monroe Township was a political battleground, having elected exclusively Democratic candidates from 1942 to 1962, when Republicans broke their losing streak. By 1966, however, Monroe had reverted to its Democratic roots, and Garibaldi was the lone Republican on the Township Committee. He lost his re-election bid to George Allen by about 300 votes.

=== New Jersey General Assembly (1968–74) ===
==== 1967 and 1969 elections ====
After the United States Supreme Court decision in Reynolds v. Sims required New Jersey to redraw its legislative districts to be roughly equal in population, a new two-member General Assembly district including most towns in Middlesex County south of the Raritan River was drawn for the 1967 elections. Garibaldi ran on the Republican ticket with North Brunswick lobbyist Richard Olsen against John Kozak, attorney for South River, and Frank Deiner Jr., a North Brunswick manufacturer and son of a well-known journalist. During the campaign, Garibaldi complained bitterly when the Middlesex County Labor Council endorsed the Democratic ticket, as he was the only union member in the race.

The 1967 elections were ultimately a landslide for the New Jersey Republican Party, and they won four out of six Assembly seats in Middlesex County. Garibaldi was the top vote-getter in District 7A, with Olsen narrowly beating Kozak for the second seat.

In 1969, state legislative districts were redrawn again, and all four Middlesex Republicans were drawn into the same district. Garibaldi and incumbent Robert Haelig Jr. received the organization endorsement and easily defeated Olsen in a primary. In the general election, they faced Herbert Tanzman, the mayor of Highland Park and brother of state senator Norman Tanzman, and Daniel Horgan. Boosted by the gubernatorial campaign of William T. Cahill, Garibaldi and Haelig won in a landslide.

==== 1970 U.S. House campaign ====
In 1970, Garibaldi ran for the United States House of Representatives, challenging incumbent Edward J. Patten. Patten, a veteran of New Jersey politics, easily defeated Garibaldi by over 34,000 votes.

==== 1971 election ====
In 1971, several Democratic candidates came forward to challenge Garibaldi and Haelig; they ultimately nominated William J. Hamilton, a former assistant U.S. attorney, and Joseph Valenti, a member of the Milltown Borough Council. Hamilton was the law partner of George Shamy, the chair of the New Brunswick Democratic Committee. With Governor Cahill's popularity sinking, the Middlesex Democrats won six of seven Assembly seats; Garibaldi, who was increasingly critical of Cahill, was the lone surviving Republican. He trailed Hamilton by 109 votes and led Valenti by only 115.

==== 1972 U.S. House campaign ====
After congressional redistricting moved Monroe into the Mercer County-based district of nine-term incumbent Frank Thompson, Garibaldi made another run for U.S. House in 1972. Although President Richard Nixon easily defeated George McGovern in the district, Garibaldi lost to Thompson by a similar margin.

==== 1973 State Senate campaign ====
By 1973, Garibaldi's criticism of Cahill and conflicts with Assembly speaker Thomas Kean and Middlesex party chair Harry Richardson imperiled his party standing. His base of power was further eroded when the New Jersey legislative districts were redrawn for the third time in four elections, moving to a forty-district map with one senator and two Assembly members per district. Monroe was placed in the new 12th legislative district, which also included Old Bridge, Middletown, and six smaller Monmouth County municipalities. Amid his ongoing feuds with party leadership, it became clear he would not receive the organization endorsement for re-election.

Instead of running an uphill battle for re-election to the Assembly, Garibaldi surprised political observers by filing an independent campaign for Senate against Republican incumbent Joseph Azzolina and Democratic assemblyman Eugene J. Bedell. Because Bedell was expected to depend on votes from union members and Middlesex County, Garibaldi had the potential to pull support from both candidates and act as a spoiler. However, Garibaldi was ultimately not a factor in the race, as Bedell won by a wide margin amid an overwhelming Democratic landslide in the wake of the Watergate scandal, and Garibaldi received only six percent of the vote.

=== Mayor of Monroe Township (1976–88) and New Jersey Senate (1984–88) ===
Garibaldi was elected mayor of Monroe Township in 1975, defeating council president John Klink by 475 votes. He was re-elected in 1979 in a landslide against council president Michael Dipierro. As mayor, he argued that the township should not be split between two area codes and five Zip codes.

In 1981, Garibaldi again ran for State Senate as a Republican while still serving as mayor. Although party support went to realtor Joseph Cooperstein, Garibaldi ran against the party and won a convincing landslide with 74 percent of the vote in the primary. In the general election, he faced Democratic assemblyman Joseph Bornheimer. Bornheimer won a close race with convincing margins in East Brunswick and his hometown of Edison, which overcame Garibaldi's wide margin in Monroe.

Garibaldi was re-elected as mayor in 1983 by a wide margin over Richard Pucci; he simultaneously ran for State Senate against Bornheimer. Garibaldi won the rematch by 583 votes, with independent physician Robert Maurer acting as spoiler and winning 2,769 votes. Bornheimer's margins in Edison and East Brunswick were far narrower than in 1981. He was the first Republican elected to represent Middlesex County in the New Jersey Senate in 54 years. In the Senate, Garibaldi controversially attempted to invoke the tradition of senatorial courtesy to block the reappointment of Chief Justice of the New Jersey Supreme Court Robert Wilentz. Although Wilentz was from Middlesex County, Senate president John F. Russo stripped Garibaldi of senatorial courtesy.

In the 1987 midterm elections, Garibaldi was targeted by the Democratic Party as a top priority. He faced Thomas Paterniti, an assemblyman and former mayor of Edison, in the general election. Paterniti won by a landslide, outrunning Garibaldi by over nine thousand votes. Garibaldi was simultaneously defeated for re-election as mayor of Monroe by Richard Pucci. In fact, Pucci received a greater share of the vote in Monroe than did Paterniti in the district as a whole.

Garibaldi made a final run for Senate in 1991, again running as an independent in a sharply contested race between Democratic incumbent Francis McManimon and Republican Peter Inverso, who won by a large margin. Garibaldi finished a distant third.

== Personal life and death ==
Garibaldi married his wife, Lynne, in 1957. They had seven children. He was an accomplished accordion player and flew his private seaplane over Barnegat Bay.

Garibaldi died from cancer at Jersey Shore University Medical Center in Neptune Township, New Jersey, on August 20, 2023, at the age of 91. Monroe Township mayor Steve Dalina announced that flags in the township would be lowered to half-mast in his memory.
