= Thomas H. Paterniti =

American politician

Member of the New Jersey Senate from the 18th district
- In office January 12, 1988 – January 14, 1992
- Preceded by: Peter P. Garibaldi
- Succeeded by: Jack Sinagra

Member of the New Jersey General Assembly from the 18th district
- In office January 8, 1980 – January 12, 1988 Serving with James Bornheimer and Frank M. Pelly
- Preceded by: John H. Froude
- Succeeded by: George A. Spadoro

Mayor of Edison
- In office 1974–1978
- Preceded by: Bernard J. Dwyer
- Succeeded by: Anthony M. Yelencsics
- In office January 1990 – 1991
- Preceded by: Steven J. Capestro
- Succeeded by: Samuel V. Convery Jr.

Personal details
- Born: February 4, 1929 Perth Amboy, New Jersey
- Died: May 13, 2017 (aged 88) Edison, New Jersey
- Party: Democratic
- Spouse: Helen "Pix" (Soltesz) Paterniti
- Children: four
- Education: Seton Hall University (B.S.); University of Maryland (D.D.S.)
- Occupation: Dentist

Thomas H. Paterniti (February 4, 1929 – May 13, 2017) was an American dentist and Democratic Party politician who served as Mayor of Edison, New Jersey, on two separate tenures and in both houses of the New Jersey Legislature, where he represented the 18th Legislative District. He served four terms in the New Jersey General Assembly, from 1980 to 1988, followed by a single term in the New Jersey Senate, from 1988 to 1992.

== Biography ==
Paterniti was born on February 4, 1929, in Perth Amboy, New Jersey. A graduate of Most Holy Rosary School in Perth Amboy and Perth Amboy High School, he served two years in the United States Army from 1946 to 1948. After working various trades, he graduated from Seton Hall University with a Bachelor of Science in chemistry and from the University of Maryland with a Doctorate of Dental Surgery. He maintained a dental office in Metuchen from 1957 to 2016 and also practiced at JFK Medical Center.

He served as Mayor of Edison for a single term from 1974 to 1978. He first won election to the General Assembly in 1979 together with fellow Democrat James Bornheimer. After Bornheimer ran successfully for the district's Senate seat, Paterniti and Frank M. Pelly won election in 1981, 1983 and 1985.

In 1985, Paterniti introduced legislation in the Assembly that would require owners of adult bookstores to maintain a list of the names and addresses of their customers, stating that "it has been reported that homosexual activity has taken place at adult bookstores" and that the list could be used to help control the spread of AIDS by discouraging homosexual activity at these stores. Under the terms of Paterniti's bill, store owners would be held liable if individuals contracted AIDS as a result of sexual activity on the premises.

In the 1987 election, Paterniti ran for the New Jersey Senate, defeating incumbent Republican Peter P. Garibaldi 59.2% to 40.8%. In the campaign against Garibaldi, Paterniti argued that his opponent was double dipping, holding a seat in the Senate as well as serving as mayor of Monroe Township. In 1989, Paterniti was elected as Mayor of Edison, New Jersey, following the death of Anthony M. Yelencsics in April 1989. He served one year from January 1990 to 1991 when he stepped down to focus on his upcoming Senate campaign.

In an October 1990 article, The New York Times had cited local criticism of Paterniti for holding onto three jobs simultaneously, as mayor and State Senator, while still maintaining an active dental practice. Paterniti insisted that there was no issue in his holding the multiple jobs, citing "the art of delegation and the ability to structure time properly". In the June 1991 primaries, Paterniti lost the Democratic state senate nomination to lawyer Harry Pozycki of Metuchen, who in turn lost the general election to Republican Jack Sinagra.

Paterniti ran for the Assembly in 1993 together with running mate Matthew Vaughn, losing to incumbent Republicans Harriet E. Derman and Jeffrey A. Warsh. In 1997, Paterniti ran for the Senate again, losing to Sinagra by a margin of 58.5%-41.5%.

From 1970 to 1978, and again from 1992 to 2015, Paterniti served as chairman of the Edison Democratic Organization. Paterniti died on May 13, 2017, at JFK Medical Center at age 88.
