= Deborah Poritz =

American judge (born 1936)

Chief Justice of the Supreme Court of New Jersey
- In office July 10, 1996 – October 26, 2006
- Governor: Christine Todd Whitman
- Preceded by: Robert N. Wilentz
- Succeeded by: James R. Zazzali

Attorney General of New Jersey
- In office January 18, 1994 – July 10, 1996
- Governor: Christine Todd Whitman
- Preceded by: Robert Del Tufo
- Succeeded by: Peter Verniero

Personal details
- Born: October 26, 1936 (age 89) Brooklyn, New York, U.S.
- Education: Brooklyn College (BA); University of Pennsylvania (JD)

Deborah Tobias Poritz (born October 26, 1936) is an American jurist. She was the chief justice of the New Jersey Supreme Court from 1996 to 2006, and was the Attorney General of New Jersey from 1994 to 1996, in both cases becoming the first woman to serve in that position.

== Early life and teaching ==
Poritz was born in Brooklyn, New York and graduated from James Madison High School in 1954 and Brooklyn College in 1958. She became a Woodrow Wilson Fellow in English and American Literature at Columbia University. Poritz became an English teacher at Ursinus College.

== Legal career ==
After graduating from the University of Pennsylvania Law School in 1977 at age 40, Poritz became a Deputy Attorney General in the New Jersey Department of Law and Public Safety. In 1981, she was named as the Assistant Chief of the Environmental Protection Section. She later served as Deputy Attorney General in Charge of Appeals, Chief of the Banking, Insurance and Public Securities Section, and later as Director of the Division of Law, and finally she was named the Chief Counsel to Governor of New Jersey Thomas Kean. From 1990 to 1994, Poritz was a partner in the Princeton law firm of Jamieson, Moore, Peskin & Spicer.

Poritz was the first woman to serve as Attorney General of New Jersey. She was nominated to the position by Governor of New Jersey Christine Todd Whitman in January 1994. As Attorney General, she oversaw the divisions of Law, Criminal Justice, Gaming Enforcement, Motor Vehicles, Consumer Affairs, Civil Rights and the New Jersey State Police. She served as attorney general until she took office as chief justice.

Poritz was nominated to be Chief Justice by Governor Whitman on June 20, 1996, and was confirmed on June 27, 1996. She was sworn in as the first female Chief Justice of the New Jersey Supreme Court on July 10, 1996. Poritz served until October 25, 2006, when she retired, due to New Jersey's mandatory retirement age for judges.

As of December 2008, Poritz is of counsel to the Princeton office of Drinker, Biddle & Reath. Poritz served as one of seven members of the Judicial Advisory Panel until 2010 when she and the other members of the panel resigned to protest Governor Chris Christie's decision not to renominate Supreme Court Justice John Wallace. The resigning panel criticized the decision as an encroachment on judicial independence.

In 2011, Poritz joined the Rutgers School of Law in Newark and in Camden as a resident professor.

In 2016, at a Princeton Public Library book discussion, Poritz criticized governor and candidate for president Chris Christie, saying that she did not see a legacy of his governance.

== Awards and honors ==
The American Civil Liberties Union of New Jersey gave Poritz the Roger Baldwin Award, the organization's highest honor, in 2007.

== Personal life ==
Poritz is married to Alan, a mathematician. The couple has two sons.

== See also ==
- List of female state attorneys general in the United States
- List of Jewish American jurists

Legal offices
Preceded by Robert Del Tufo	Attorney General of New Jersey; 1994 – 1996	Succeeded by Peter Verniero
Preceded by Robert N. Wilentz	Chief Justice of the Supreme Court of New Jersey; 1996 – 2006	Succeeded by James R. Zazzali
