= James Bornheimer =

American politician

Member of the New Jersey Senate from the 18th district
- In office January 12, 1982 – January 10, 1984
- Preceded by: Bernard J. Dwyer
- Succeeded by: Peter P. Garibaldi

Member of the New Jersey General Assembly
- In office January 11, 1972 – January 12, 1982 Serving with John H. Froude and Thomas H. Paterini
- Preceded by: Martin E. Kravarik; Donald Macrae
- Succeeded by: Frank M. Pelly
- Constituency: District 7B (1972–1974); 18th district (1974–1982)

Personal details
- Born: October 19, 1933 New Brunswick, New Jersey
- Died: October 9, 1993 (aged 59) East Brunswick, New Jersey
- Party: Democratic
- Spouse: Bernadette Bornheimer

James W. Bornheimer Jr. (October 19, 1933 – October 9, 1993) was an American Democratic Party politician who served in the New Jersey General Assembly from 1972 to 1982 and in the New Jersey Senate from 1982 to 1984.

Born in New Brunswick, he attended St. Peter the Apostle High School there and attended St. Peter's College in Jersey City where he earned a B.S. in accounting. While living in East Brunswick, he served as the township assessor, and on the board for the township's planning board and sewerage commission. Bornheimer would eventually be elected to the East Brunswick township council attaining the position of council president.

In 1971, he was elected to General Assembly by winning one of two seats available in District 7B, the other being won by fellow Democrat John H. Froude. In the next election, he was elected from the 18th district and was reelected three more times from that district. While in the Assembly, he was chair of the Banking and Insurance Committee and director of the Conference of Insurance Legislators. In 1981, he was elected to the Senate from the same district defeating former Assemblyman Peter P. Garibaldi. He served for one two-year term before being defeated by Garibaldi in a rematch in 1983.

He died at his East Brunswick home on October 9, 1993, at age 59.
