= Frank M. Pelly =

American politician

Member of the New Jersey General Assembly from the 18th Legislative District
- In office January 12, 1982 – July 1, 1991 Serving with Thomas H. Paterniti; George A. Spadoro
- Preceded by: James Bornheimer
- Succeeded by: Michael J. Baker

Executive Director of the New Jersey Lottery
- In office July 1991 – July 1994
- Preceded by: Russell R. Hart (acting)
- Succeeded by: Virginia E. Haines

Personal details
- Born: August 3, 1933 (age 92) New Brunswick, New Jersey
- Party: Democratic
- Education: University of Georgia

Frank M. Pelly (born August 3, 1933) is an American politician who served in the New Jersey General Assembly from the 18th Legislative District from 1982 to 1991.

Born on August 3, 1933, in New Brunswick, New Jersey, and raised there, Pelly graduated from New Brunswick High School in 1951. Pelly graduated in 1956 from the University of Georgia in 1956 with a degree in pharmacy, and operated a pharmacy in New Brunswick. A resident of North Brunswick, New Jersey, Pelly served as a board of education trustee on the North Brunswick Township Public Schools, on the township council and as a member of the Middlesex County Board of Chosen Freeholders.

In May 1991, Pelly was named by Governor James Florio to serve as executive director of the New Jersey Lottery, after Pelly announced that he would not be seeking re-election; he succeeded acting lottery head Russell R. Hart, who took over when Barbara Marrow-Mooring stepped down. As head of the lottery, Pelly had a hotline number for compulsive gamblers printed on all lottery tickets. In May 1994, Governor Christine Todd Whitman nominated Virginia E. Haines to succeed Pelly as head of the New Jersey Lottery.
