= George A. Spadoro =

American politician (born 1948)

Mayor of Edison
- In office January 1, 1994 – January 1, 2006
- Preceded by: Samuel V. Convery Jr.
- Succeeded by: Jun Choi

Member of the New Jersey General Assembly from the 18th district
- In office January 12, 1988 – January 14, 1992 Serving with Frank M. Pelly; Michael J. Baker
- Preceded by: Thomas H. Paterniti
- Succeeded by: Harriet E. Derman; Jeffrey A. Warsh

Personal details
- Born: March 27, 1948 (age 78) Jersey City, New Jersey, U.S.
- Party: Democratic
- Education: University of Connecticut (BA); University of California, Hastings College of the Law (JD)

George A. Spadoro (born March 27, 1948) is an American Democratic Party politician who served three terms as Mayor of Edison, and two terms in the New Jersey General Assembly, where he represented the 18th Legislative District.

== Early life and education ==
Spadoro was born in Jersey City, New Jersey. After moving to Edison, New Jersey he attended J. P. Stevens High School and graduated in 1966.

He attended college at the University of Connecticut for 4 years, where he served as chairman of the student senate and vice president of the student government. He graduated with his Bachelor of Arts in 1970. Spadoro then continued on to the University of California Hastings College of Law, where he named to the Hastings Law Journal, was elected student government president of the Associated Students of Hastings (ASH) and served as an ex officio member of the law school board of governors.

As ASH president, Spadoro worked to implement a number of programs, such as The Placement Policy Committee, which was designed to aid the director in expanding job placement services for Hastings graduates and other operational difficulties.

He also developed and implemented the Judicial Clerkship Committee to assist students in determining the educational and career advantages of a post-graduate Judicial clerkship. At the same time he obtained assistance for this program from individual members of the Hastings Faculty. Another program Spadoro worked to develop and implement was The California Supreme Court Externship Program, which allowed for a carefully selected student to spend a considerable part of a full semester working as a judicial clerk under the auspices of a California Supreme Court judge.

George Spadoro graduated University of California Hastings College of Law with a J.D. in 1973.

== Political career ==
Spadoro first ran for public office in 1978, challenging incumbent Democratic Congressman Edward J. Patten in the primary election and receiving 41% of the vote. During the 1980s, Spadoro was a member of the Edison Township Council.

=== Mayor of Edison, NJ ===
Spadoro was elected mayor of Edison Township in November 1993. His campaign focused on the issues of job creation and tax stabilization, environmental protection and the preservation of open spaces, and open and accessible government. Mayor Spadoro took office on January 1, 1994. He won a second term in 1997, defeating seven challengers. In the landslide victory, Spadoro received 14,081 votes. His nearest competitor, Republican Eileen Germain Teffenhart, received 5,782.

Shortly after being sworn in as Mayor, Spadoro had the honor of hosting the visit of President Bill Clinton to Edison on February 16, 1994. The president had come to deliver an address to the American Association of Retired Persons in Edison.

On March 23, Spadoro led Edison and the regions response to Edison's most serious disaster—the Texas Eastern gas line explosion and fire at the Durham Woods Apartment Complex. He received national attention and was commended for his emergency response implementations and was also recorded banging on doors to help evacuate apartment residents in the nearby explosion. The explosion resulted in 1,500 residents were evacuated, 100 were residents were left homeless, 60 were injured and one died of a heart attack.

After the disaster, he fought to improve pipeline safety conditions and had become a nationally recognized figure for pipeline safety reform nationwide. The mayor cited the township's reverse 911 system, a "state-of-the-art" emergency communications center, improved public safety equipment, and the civilian emergency response team (ECERT) as examples of measures taken to make the township safer.

At the local level, budgets proposed by Mayor Spadoro included a stabilized tax rate for Edison's almost 100,000 residents. His commitment to reduce the tax burden on local residents was also manifested in several major efforts to create a business-friendly environment in Edison, including the establishment of the Edison Economic Development Corporation.

Other achievements include the establishment of the Edison Youth Service Corps. The Youth Service Corps features high school-age students who perform a wide range of community service activities in exchange for modest wages and college tuition assistance.

Also among George Spadoro's accomplishments as Mayor was the formation of a community-policing program. Under this program, law enforcement officers establish a closer bond with Edison residents and business establishments in an effort to better understand problems in the community and to stop crimes before they actually occur. Community Policing consisted of Edison's first Police Bike Patrol, Civilian Police Academy, and other programs to take a proactive approach to policing.

George Spadoro ran for re-election for Mayor in November 1997 and 2001 and was chosen by the people to continue to serve at the helm of the 5th largest municipality in the state. He began his third term on January 1, 2002.

The establishment of the Edison Arts Society marked a triumph for the Mayor, as he increased community awareness about the rich arts culture in Edison. The first Arts Summit, held in June 1998, included speaker Robert Pastorelli, an actor who has played 'Eldin' on Murphy Brown, and focused on the importance of the arts in Edison. Following the establishment of the Arts Society, a number of programs including the organization of the Edison Symphony Orchestra and an Annual High School Art Competition, Holiday Dance Extravaganza, Poetry readings, and Outreach Workshops in poetry, drama, and art.

In 1999, the Mayor announced the implementation of a new Defibrillator program for Edison. By increasing the number of Defibrillators in town and by training personnel in the use of them, Mayor Spadoro hoped to save lives. The program included training of police, fire, and municipal personnel as well as companies and citizens around Edison. He also introduced a police car take home program, reducing maintenance costs and increasing police visibility in the community.

Following the September 11, 2001 attack on the World Trade Center, Spadoro, along with many other New York municipalities, authorized members of the Edison Police and Fire Department to provide emergency response support at ground zero, the site of the attack.

Amongst Spadoro's post 9/11 efforts, he actively had the Edison Police Department work with the joint terrorism task force to help in anti terrorism efforts. Spadoro recognized that Edison, being one of the largest municipalities near New York City, was a target-rich environment, with such potential sites as warehouses, distribution centers, factories and chemical plants. He allocated $500,000/year in Edison's annual budget over five years for more police officers, training for first responders, new equipment to cope with terrorism, and the formation of a police intelligence unit. He participated in the coordinated network of intelligence gathering and emergency responses put together by the State and its counties. Also, among his post 9/11 efforts as mayor, he dealt with an anthrax attack at a city post-office and other safety concerns.

On December 9, 2001, Ford had announced their plans to close their assembly plant which was expected to impact 1,700 employees. Spadoro played a role in attempts to prevent the massive layoff when he urged an "economic summit" with Ford officials, the United Auto Workers and members of McGreevey's administration. His attempts extended further with James McGreevey and their traveling to Michigan to meet with Ford Executives. After the attempts to prevent the factory closing, Spadoro made plans for redevelopment of the land that was anticipated to have a positive impact on the town of Edison .

Mayor Spadoro led an initiative to purchase and preserve several parcels of open space important to the environment. Mayor Spadoro also explored the use of the seven miles of Raritan Riverfront, that wind through Edison, for recreational use and possible development. Also along the Raritan, the Mayor was actively pursuing the establishment of ferry service between Edison and lower Manhattan. George Spadoro continued his work with increasing senior citizen services by instilling programs such as one where senior citizens were introduced to the World Wide Web in a relaxed atmosphere at the Edison Senior Center and the creation of the Mr. Fix It service, which consisted of a free handyman service that provided a home safety inspection and common repair jobs.

On August 4, 2002, Spadoro made efforts to restore the Thomas Edison Memorial Tower by hiring its first full-time employee who helped restore the tower and its museum. The newly hired employees title was museum director and his job included everything from painting the base of the tower to persuading famous people, such as President Gerald R. Ford and Walter Cronkite, to record their voices on a 1909-cylinder phonograph invented by Edison.

During his tenure as Mayor, Spadoro served on the board of directors of Keep Middlesex Moving Inc., an organization dedicated to promoting transportation issues, opportunities, and alternatives in Middlesex County. He was also a member of the Garden State Games and the Environmental Management Hazardous Waste Institution.

Seeking a fourth term, he was defeated in the 2005 Democratic mayoral primary by Jun Choi. Reasons cited for Spadoro's loss include a split in the local Democratic party, the loss of union support due to the approval of a Walmart retail store, and a large turnout of first-time Asian voters due to the New Jersey 101.5 radio controversy.

=== New Jersey State Assemblyman ===
After being elected in 1987, from 1988 to 1991 (two terms), he represented District 18 in the New Jersey General Assembly. He became Chairman of the State Assembly Transportation Authorities, Telecommunications, and Technology Committee. During his term as chairman, George authored and was responsible for the passage of legislation that opened the door for the use of fiber optics. This legislation was hailed as marking the turning point in New Jersey's emergence as a leader in the telecommunications revolution.

One of Spadoro's major accomplishments as Assemblyman was his sponsorship of the New Jersey Bias Crimes Act, which has become the primary vehicle for the prosecution of bias-related crimes in New Jersey.

Through his leadership in the State Legislature, he authored and enacted New Jersey's strongest financial disclosure law which won him praise from many grassroots citizen organizations and government reform groups. The Director of New Jersey Common Cause, referred to Spadoro's legislation as "a real reform, not just cosmetic reform...a major milestone in reforming the way New Jersey State government operates."

During his tenure in the Assembly, George was also a member of the Insurance and Financial Institution Committee, the Veterans Committee, and the Special Committee on College Alcohol Abuse and Hazing in New Jersey.

=== Edison Councilman ===
George Spadoro served as an Edison Township Councilman for eight years between 1981 and 1988, serving as Council President from 1987 through 1988. Spadoro demonstrated an unending commitment to open government, the safety and security of Edison residents and senior citizens, and the preservation of the environment. His involvement with the shutting down and cleaning up of the Kin-Buc chemical waste landfill, a superfund site, extended through his political career into his days as Edison Mayor.

Among his accomplishments as Councilman, Spadoro created Edison's Senior Citizen Housing Agency and sponsored the unique Senior Citizens' Set Aside Ordinance, which required developers of multiple-unit dwellings to designate 10% of the total number of units for low and moderate income senior citizens. He led the fight to halt the construction of two co-generation incinerators in Edison and voted to save the Dismal Swamp, a 1,240-acre wetland that serves as the largest natural area in northern Middlesex County. In 1988, he organized the Edison Township Waterfront Recreation Area Study to evaluate the merits of recreational development along miles of the raritan river in Edison.

== Legal career ==
Spadoro began his legal career as an associate with a well known and top ranking Wall Street Law Firm, Sullivan & Cromwell. He also spent several years as Assistant General Counsel for a large telecommunications company called Teleprompter Corporation.

Later, Spadoro became a senior partner in the law firm Spadoro & Hilson in Woodbridge Township, NJ and was well known and recognized in the Edison community as a leader and citizen activist.

On January 1, 2008, Spadoro joined as Senior Member of CSG Law where he counsels senior executives in financing, commercial litigation and strategic planning. His primary areas of practice includes general corporate, commercial and business matters, family-business law, financial matters and mergers and acquisitions. He works with accountants and other tax experts to advise U.S. clients on their domestic legal structures. Spadoro also advises on international matters and has experience negotiating cross-border transactions.

== Current life ==
In addition to maintaining a full-time legal practice, Spadoro now provides expert television commentary on legal matters as well as current state and national political issues through multiple media outlets.

His wife is the Founder and CEO of Future Care Inc. His Daughter, Katie Spadoro, is currently the President and Founder of CYB Human Resources LLC, a human resource management service company and CYBHR, an online HR company. His Daughter, Jasmine Spadoro, is a staff member at Pace University, a private University located in downtown Manhattan.
