= Jun Choi =

American entrepreneur and politician

Jun H. Choi

Mayor of Edison, New Jersey
- In office January 1, 2006 – January 1, 2010
- Preceded by: George A. Spadoro
- Succeeded by: Antonia Ricigliano

Personal details
- Born: May 17, 1971 (age 55)
- Party: Democratic
- Education: Massachusetts Institute of Technology (BS); Columbia University (MPPA)
- Website: www.junchoi.com

Jun H. Choi (born May 17, 1971) is an American entrepreneur and politician and the former Mayor of Edison, New Jersey, a community of over 100,000 people and the fifth largest municipality in the state. He was sworn in on January 1, 2006 as the youngest mayor in Edison history and the first Asian American mayor of a major city in New Jersey.

Prior to serving as mayor, Choi worked in both business and government. He served as a senior official on education policy at the New Jersey Department of Education where he started the NJ SMART program. He also served in the White House Office of Management and Budget (OMB) and worked as a management consultant focusing on strategy and technology issues for Fortune 500 US corporations.

Choi is currently CEO of Menlo Realty Ventures, an industrial real estate investment firm, and Co-Chair of the NJ Committee for the Regional Plan Association. He earned a Bachelor of Science from the Massachusetts Institute of Technology and is a Leadership New Jersey Fellow (Class of 2003).

== Early life ==
The son of Korean immigrants, Choi was raised in Elizabeth, New Jersey at an early age before moving to Edison, New Jersey. He graduated from J.P. Stevens High School in Edison. Choi earned his pilot's license as a teenager and wanted to become a pilot/astronaut before entering public service.

== Education policy ==
After entering public service, Choi focused on education policy. He co-wrote the first overview of New Jersey's Charter Schools in 2001 with Gordon MacInnes, then the CEO of Citizens for Better Schools. He later worked at the New Jersey Department of Education in Commissioner Bill Librera's administration on a statewide program named NJ Standards Measurement and Resource for Teaching (NJ SMART).

== Mayor of Edison ==
Elected on a good government, reform-minded platform, Choi's administration brought fiscal stability to a $140 million government. He stabilized property tax increases from annual double digit increases to the rate of inflation. He reduced the size of government by 15% while improving services without permanently laying off any municipal employees. He completed several large scale economic development projects, including planning, negotiating and breaking ground on the largest redevelopment project in Edison's history—the 1.2 million sq/ft Edison Towne Square (former Ford Plant). He professionalized the Edison Police Department which earned accreditation in 2009 and completed the newly built Edison Public Safety Center. He restructured all the major departments so they operate more effectively and efficiently. Choi advanced several education projects including a township wide school construction plan and many energy efficiency programs. Choi also implemented new technologies that improved government efficiency such as Compstat (intelligence/data-driven policing), Citizen Service Request (on-line government service request and tracking system) and putting the entire municipal code (local laws) on the web for easy access.

Running on a platform to make government work better and reforming the Democratic Party, Choi won the June 2005 primary by a 56-44% margin, defeating longtime incumbent Mayor George A. Spadoro. While most of the county and state Democratic organizations endorsed Spadoro, Choi was endorsed by former Senator Bill Bradley, for whom he worked on the 2000 presidential campaign, and was unexpectedly endorsed by the UFCW and a number of traditionally candidate-neutral unions in Edison.

The 2005 Edison mayoral campaign brought together four key factors that helped Choi win both the primary and general elections. An American Prospect article details these findings. They include a 1) good government platform with relevant issues that appealed to voters, 2) attracting new American / immigrant voters into the process, an 3) anti-Walmart or economic justice theme, and 4) an effective Internet-based progressive mobilization. These dynamics, the article argues, can be a model for progressive candidates in developing a winning campaign.

During the primary campaign, Choi's campaign was attacked by the "Jersey Guys" who made anti-Asian, discriminatory comments on air. Craig Carton and Ray Rossi, two shock jocks, later apologized to Choi on their program. The Jersey Guys had said on their show that Asian Americans are not "real Americans." The controversy drew national attention and seven major advertisers withdrew their support of Millennium Radio.

For 2007 primary, Choi ran a slate of four council candidates under the "Edison Democratic Party" (Column A) ticket against the incumbent Democratic council (Column B), who were endorsed by state senator Barbara Buono as well as the county organization. Choi's opponent from his 2005 mayoral race, Bill Stephens, also led a slate of candidates under the "Edison Democrats for Change" ticket (Column C).

All four of Choi's council candidates won the primary. All four Democratic candidates subsequently won the general election. In addition, an attempt to create a ward system in Edison and expanding the council to nine members from seven was defeated in two municipal questions. Choi and the Democratic slate campaigned against the ward system. Despite a strong grip of the city council, Choi worked hard during his 4 years as Mayor to try to take control of and reform the local Democratic Party but was unable to gain the majority.

Despite the progress made, in June 2009, Choi lost his re-election narrowly (3%) in the Democratic primary during the height of the economic recession.

== Early Obama support ==
On July 27, 2007, Choi endorsed United States Senator Barack Obama for president in the 2008 election, becoming one of the earliest elected officials in New Jersey to support Obama whereas most of the party establishment supported then frontrunner Sen. Hillary Clinton. Choi, pledged to Obama, was a candidate for Democratic District Delegate in the Tenth Democratic District in New Jersey, which is composed of the 17th and 18th legislative districts. The New Jersey presidential primary, coinciding with Super Tuesday, took place on February 5, 2008.

In February 2009, Choi was one of the first group of Mayors nationwide to officially visit President Obama at the White House along with members of the cabinet.

== Congressional run ==
In May 2011, Choi announced that he would be seeking the Democratic nomination to replace Republican incumbent Congressman Leonard Lance in 2012. He outraised Lance early on in the campaign raising nearly $350,000 in 2011. He was supported by the majority of the leadership in Middlesex County including County Chair Peter Barnes, Jr., his son Assemblyman Peter Barnes, III, Assemblyman Patrick Diegnan, Jr., Mayor Dan Reiman of Carteret, State Senator Robert Smith and all 7 council members in Edison. In December 2011, Choi placed his campaign on hold after redistricting put his town of Edison in the 6th Congressional District. Choi endorsed Frank Pallone, the Democratic incumbent in the 6th District.

== See also ==
- Korean Americans in New York City
