= Joanna Gregory-Scocchi =

American politician

Joanna Gregory-Scocchi (born April 13, 1959) is an American Republican politician who served in the New Jersey General Assembly from February 16, 1994 – December 1, 1994, representing the 18th Legislative District.

After Christine Todd Whitman took office in 1994 as Governor of New Jersey, she named Republican Assemblywoman Harriet E. Derman to head the New Jersey Department of Community Affairs. A resident of North Brunswick, Gregory-Scocchi was chosen by a Republican special convention to fill Derman's vacancy and was sworn into office on February 16, 1994. While in the Assembly, Gregory-Scocchi proposed legislation that would forbid state Green Acres funds to be used to purchase land against the will of the owner, after the township sought to obtain funds that would be used to purchase the land belonging to a farmer who had no interest in selling, with the intent of converting the farm into park land. Gregory-Scocchi was the prime author of New Jersey's Sexual Registration Act known as "Megan's Law" and Call before you Dig Legislation.

In a November 1994 special election, early favorite Gregory-Scocchi was defeated by Barbara Buono, after allegations that a temporary employment firm owned by Gregory-Scocchi had hired illegal immigrants. A few weeks before the election, U.S. Immigration and Naturalization (INS) agents reviewed close to 3,000 records and found six paperwork errors. The Gregory-Scocchi camp had always maintained that this was orchestrated by her opponent in what became a hotly contested race. Buono received 27,229 votes (53.7%) and Gregory-Scocchi received 23,436 votes (46.3%). Buono was sworn into office on December 1, 1994, after the results were certified.
