= Jack Sinagra =

American politician (1950–2013)

Chairman of the Port Authority of New York and New Jersey
- In office December 13, 2001 – April 11, 2003
- Preceded by: Lewis Eisenberg
- Succeeded by: Anthony R. Coscia

Member of the New Jersey Senate from the 18th district
- In office January 12, 1992 – October 23, 2001
- Preceded by: Thomas H. Paterniti
- Succeeded by: David Himelman

Mayor of East Brunswick
- In office 1989–1991
- Preceded by: William Fox
- Succeeded by: Ira Oskowsky

Personal details
- Born: March 18, 1950 Queens, New York City
- Died: August 26, 2013 (aged 63)
- Party: Republican
- Spouse: Eileen
- Education: College of Emporia
- Occupation: Attorney

Jack G. Sinagra (March 18, 1950 – August 26, 2013) was an American Republican Party politician who was the mayor of East Brunswick, New Jersey, and served in the New Jersey Senate from 1992 to 2001, where he represented the 18th Legislative District.

== Biography ==
Born in Queens, New York City, Sinagra graduated from Bayside High School and earned his undergraduate degree from the College of Emporia in 1972, where he majored in Accounting. A Senior Vice President (and later President) with the firm of Turtle and Hughes, Sinagra was elected to the East Brunswick Township Council in 1987 and was the township's mayor from 1989 to 1991.

During his mayoral tenure, East Brunswick Township's Council passed an ordinance forbidding cigarette vending machines effective January 1, 1991, making it the first municipality in the state to impose such a ban in the face of opposition from companies that supplied the machines to local establishments which planned to pose legal challenges to the township's ordinance.

Sinagra first won election to the New Jersey Senate in 1991, when he defeated Democrat Harry S. Pozycki by a 53.5%-46.5% margin. Sinagra won re-election in 1993 by a 58.2%-39.8% margin over Democrat Samuel V. Convery, Jr. and again in 1997 by a 58.5%-41.5% margin over former Senator Thomas H. Paterniti. He served in the Senate as Chair of the Health Committee and on the Commerce Committee.

Fulfilling a campaign pledge that he had made when first running for the New Jersey Legislature, Sinagra sponsored a bill passed by the State Senate in 1992 that would ban the practice of double dipping, in which elected officials served in more than one elected position simultaneously. The Senate passed legislation in May 1998 that had been sponsored by Sinagra, which required the installation of shock absorbing material around all equipment at all public and private playgrounds within five years and would require all wood or metal swing seats to be replaced with plastic within 15 years.

After Lewis M. Eisenberg left his post as Chairman of the Port Authority of New York and New Jersey in September 2001, Sinagra was nominated by Acting Governor of New Jersey Donald DiFrancesco as his replacement. He was confirmed as a commissioner and resigned his Senate seat on October 23, 2001. The Port Authority's Board of Commissioners elected Sinagra as the agency's Chairman in December 2001.

A resident of New York City, Sinagra died on August 26, 2013, from undisclosed causes at the age of 63.

New Jersey Senate
Preceded by Thomas H. Paterniti	Member of the New Jersey Senate from the 18th district January 14, 1992 – October 23, 2001	Succeeded by David Himelman
