= South Plainfield, New Jersey =

Borough in Middlesex County, New Jersey, US

- Borough
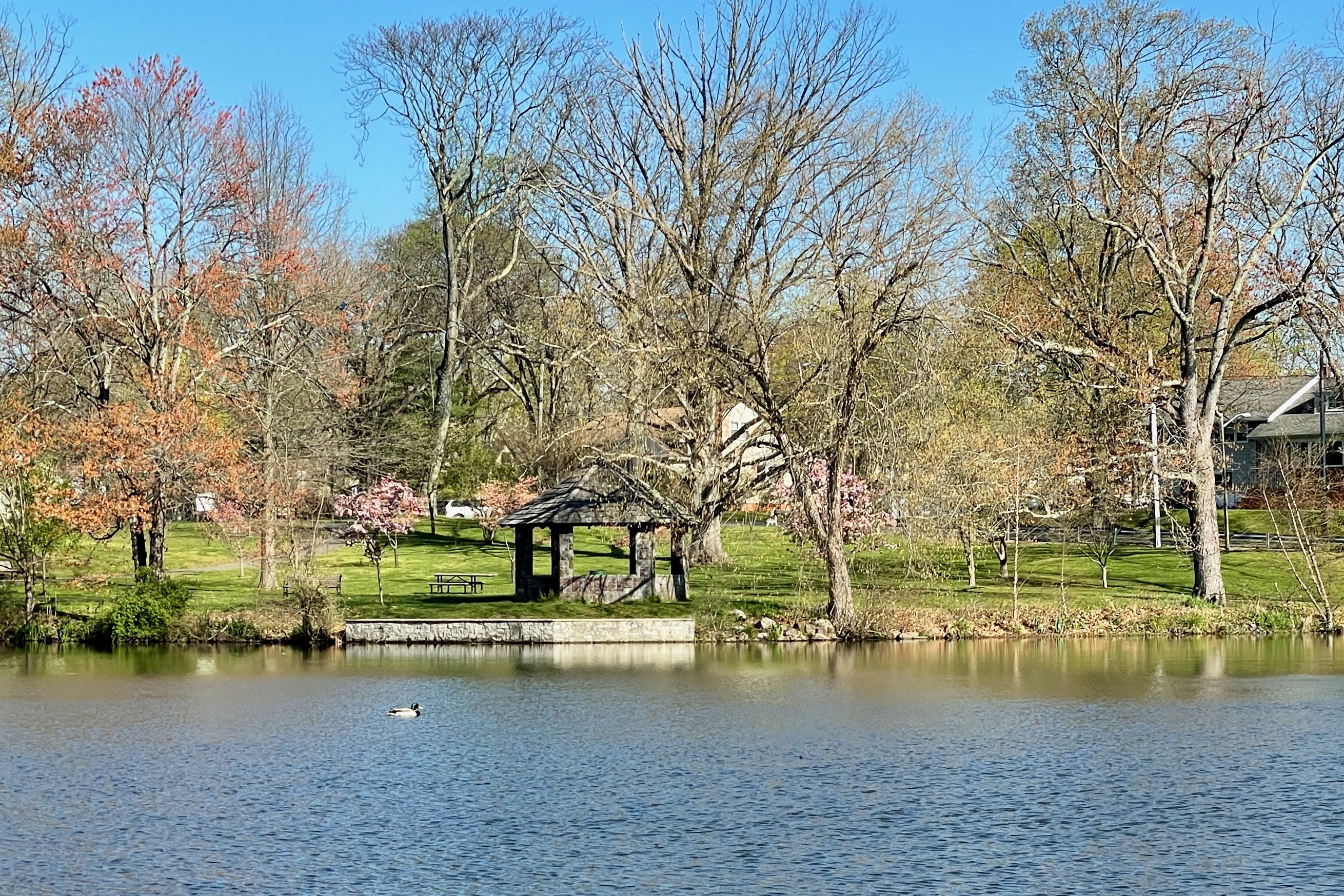
- Cedar Brook Park, spanning South Plainfield in Middlesex County and its Union County neighbor Plainfield

- Seal
- Motto: Vision – Family – Industry
- Location of South Plainfield in Middlesex County highlighted in red (left). Inset map: Location of Middlesex County in New Jersey highlighted in orange (right).

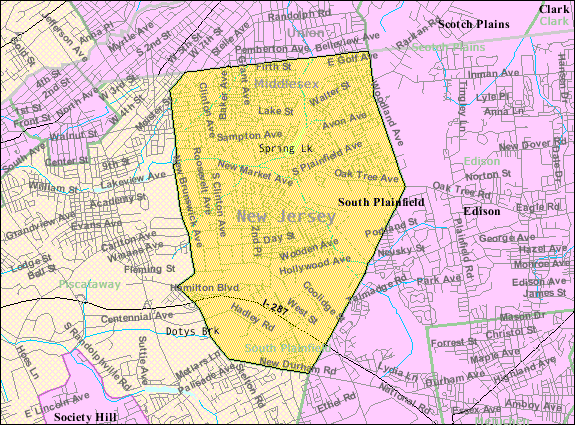
- Census Bureau map of South Plainfield, New Jersey

- Location in Middlesex County Location in New Jersey Location in the United States
- Coordinates: 40.574413°N 74.4148°W
- Country: United States
- State: New Jersey
- County: Middlesex
- Incorporated: April 6, 1926

Government
  - Type: Borough
  - Body: Borough Council
  - Mayor: Matthew P. Anesh (R, term ends December 31, 2026)
  - Administrator: Glenn Cullen
  - Municipal clerk: Amy L. Antonides

Area
  - Total: 8.33 sq mi (21.58 km^{2})
  - Land: 8.30 sq mi (21.49 km^{2})
  - Water: 0.035 sq mi (0.09 km^{2}) 0.42%
  - Rank: 228th of 565 in state 12th of 25 in county
- Elevation: 82 ft (25 m)

Population (2020)
  - Total: 24,338
  - Estimate (2023): 24,131
  - Rank: 108th of 565 in state 13th of 25 in county
  - Density: 2,933.7/sq mi (1,132.7/km^{2})
  - Rank: 221st of 565 in state 18th of 25 in county
- Time zone: UTC−05:00 (Eastern (EST))
  - Summer (DST): UTC−04:00 (Eastern (EDT))
- ZIP Code: 07080
- Area code: 908
- FIPS code: 3402369390
- GNIS feature ID: 0885402
- Website: www.southplainfieldnj.com

South Plainfield is a borough in northern Middlesex County, in the U.S. state of New Jersey. South Plainfield was incorporated as a borough on March 6, 1926, from portions of Piscataway Township.The borough is situated on the border with Union County in the Raritan Valley region, within the New York metropolitan area. As of the 2020 United States census, the borough's population was 24,338, its highest decennial count ever and an increase of 953 (+4.1%) from the 23,385 recorded at the 2010 census, which in turn reflected an increase of 1,575 (+7.2%) from the 21,810 counted in the 2000 census.

South Plainfield was incorporated by an act of the New Jersey Legislature on March 12, 1926, from portions of Piscataway, based on the results of a referendum passed on April 6, 1926. The borough's name derives from Plainfield, which derived its name from a local estate or from its scenic location.

== Geography ==
According to the United States Census Bureau, the borough had a total area of 8.33 square miles (21.58 km^{2}), including 8.30 square miles (21.49 km^{2}) of land and 0.04 square miles (0.09 km^{2}) of water (0.42%).

Unincorporated communities, localities and place names located partially or completely within the township include Avon Park, Hadley Airport, Holly Park and Samptown.

The borough is bordered by Piscataway on the south and west, Edison on the east, both in Middlesex County, and by Plainfield on the north and Scotch Plains both in Union County.

== Demographics ==
Historical population
Census	Pop.	Note	%±
1930	5,047		—
1940	5,379		6.6%
1950	8,008		48.9%
1960	17,879		123.3%
1970	21,142		18.3%
1980	20,512		−3.0%
1990	20,489		−0.1%
2000	21,810		6.4%
2010	23,385		7.2%
2020	24,338		4.1%
2023 (est.)	24,131	▼	−0.9%
Population sources:1930 1940–2000 2000; 2010 2020

=== 2020 census ===
As of the 2020 census, South Plainfield had a population of 24,338. The median age was 40.7 years. 20.6% of residents were under the age of 18 and 16.8% of residents were 65 years of age or older. For every 100 females there were 95.0 males, and for every 100 females age 18 and over there were 93.1 males age 18 and over.

100.0% of residents lived in urban areas, while 0.0% lived in rural areas.

There were 8,217 households in South Plainfield, of which 36.0% had children under the age of 18 living in them. Of all households, 60.2% were married-couple households, 13.1% were households with a male householder and no spouse or partner present, and 21.8% were households with a female householder and no spouse or partner present. About 17.3% of all households were made up of individuals and 8.4% had someone living alone who was 65 years of age or older.

There were 8,432 housing units, of which 2.5% were vacant. The homeowner vacancy rate was 0.8% and the rental vacancy rate was 3.3%.

Racial composition as of the 2020 census
Race	Number	Percent
White	12,350	50.7%
Black or African American	2,650	10.9%
American Indian and Alaska Native	128	0.5%
Asian	4,610	18.9%
Native Hawaiian and Other Pacific Islander	6	0.0%
Some other race	2,166	8.9%
Two or more races	2,428	10.0%
Hispanic or Latino (of any race)	4,555	18.7%

=== 2010 census ===
The 2010 United States census counted 23,385 people, 7,876 households, and 6,175 families in the borough. The population density was 2,808.5 per square mile (1,084.4/km^{2}). There were 8,093 housing units at an average density of 971.9 per square mile (375.3/km^{2}). The racial makeup was 66.74% (15,607) White, 10.10% (2,361) Black or African American, 0.37% (87) Native American, 14.68% (3,433) Asian, 0.03% (8) Pacific Islander, 4.79% (1,120) from other races, and 3.29% (769) from two or more races. Hispanic or Latino of any race were 13.24% (3,097) of the population.

Of the 7,876 households, 35.2% had children under the age of 18; 62.1% were married couples living together; 12.3% had a female householder with no husband present and 21.6% were non-families. Of all households, 18.2% were made up of individuals and 8.2% had someone living alone who was 65 years of age or older. The average household size was 2.93 and the average family size was 3.34.

23.0% of the population were under the age of 18, 8.0% from 18 to 24, 26.2% from 25 to 44, 29.2% from 45 to 64, and 13.5% who were 65 years of age or older. The median age was 40.2 years. For every 100 females, the population had 94.4 males. For every 100 females ages 18 and older there were 92.1 males.

The Census Bureau's 2006–2010 American Community Survey showed that (in 2010 inflation-adjusted dollars) median household income was $92,263 (with a margin of error of +/− $5,066) and the median family income was $98,913 (+/− $4,289). Males had a median income of $61,480 (+/− $7,597) versus $48,639 (+/− $4,924) for females. The per capita income for the borough was $33,495 (+/− $1,546). About 2.7% of families and 4.0% of the population were below the poverty line, including 3.9% of those under age 18 and 2.5% of those age 65 or over.

=== 2000 census ===
As of the 2000 United States census there were 21,810 people, 7,151 households, and 5,856 families residing in the borough. The population density was 2,609.8 inhabitants per square mile (1,007.6/km^{2}). There were 7,307 housing units at an average density of 874.3 per square mile (337.6/km^{2}). The racial makeup of the borough was 77.74% White, 8.56% African American, 0.22% Native American, 7.57% Asian, 3.48% from other races, and 2.42% from two or more races. Hispanic or Latino of any race were 8.66% of the population.

There were 7,151 households, out of which 37.6% had children under the age of 18 living with them, 66.8% were married couples living together, 10.9% had a female householder with no husband present, and 18.1% were non-families. 15.3% of all households were made up of individuals, and 7.5% had someone living alone who was 65 years of age or older. The average household size was 3.01 and the average family size was 3.35.

In the borough, the population was spread out, with 25.1% under the age of 18, 7.2% from 18 to 24, 29.9% from 25 to 44, 23.7% from 45 to 64, and 14.1% who were 65 years of age or older. The median age was 38 years. For every 100 females, there were 96.1 males. For every 100 females age 18 and over, there were 92.6 males.

The median income for a household in the borough was $67,466, and the median income for a family was $72,745. Males had a median income of $47,465 versus $34,329 for females. The per capita income for the borough was $25,270. About 2.3% of families and 3.4% of the population were below the poverty line, including 3.7% of those under age 18 and 4.4% of those age 65 or over.

== Economy ==
Tumi Inc. is a manufacturer of suitcases and bags for travel that was founded in 1975 by Charlie Clifford after serving in Peru with the Peace Corps.

PTC Therapeutics is a pharmaceutical company focused on the development of small molecule, orally administered treatments for orphan diseases.

Jem Records (also known as JEM Records) was a record label that existed from 1970 to 1988, at the time principally known as the parent company of Passport Records; The label was resurrected in 2013 as Jem Recordings.

== Sports ==
The Plainfield Curling Club is a curling club that owns and operates the only dedicated curling facility in New Jersey. Established in 1963, the club's two-sheet structure was completed in 1967.

== Government ==
=== Local government ===
South Plainfield is governed under the borough form of New Jersey municipal government, which is used in 218 municipalities (of the 564) statewide, making it the most common form of government in New Jersey. The governing body is composed of the mayor and the borough council, with all positions elected at-large on a partisan basis as part of the November general election. The mayor is elected directly by the voters to a four-year term of office. The borough council includes six members elected to serve three-year terms on a staggered basis, with two seats coming up for election each year in a three-year cycle. The borough form of government used by South Plainfield is a "weak mayor / strong council" government in which council members act as the legislative body with the mayor presiding at meetings and voting only in the event of a tie. The mayor can veto ordinances subject to an override by a two-thirds majority vote of the council. The mayor makes committee and liaison assignments for council members, and most appointments are made by the mayor with the advice and consent of the council.

As of 2025, the mayor of South Plainfield is Republican Matthew P. Anesh, whose term of office ends December 31, 2026. Members of the South Plainfield Borough Council are Council President Robert A. Bengivenga Jr. (R, 2027), Christine Noonan Faustini (R, 2026), Melanie McCann-Mott (R, 2025), Peter D. Smith (R, 2025), Derryck C. White (R, 2026) and Joseph Wolak (R, 2027).

=== Federal, state and county representation ===
South Plainfield is located in the 6th Congressional District and is part of New Jersey's 18th state legislative district

For the 119th United States Congress, New Jersey's 6th congressional district is represented by Frank Pallone (D, Long Branch). New Jersey is represented in the United States Senate by Democrats Cory Booker (Newark, term ends 2027) and Andy Kim (Moorestown, term ends 2031).

For the 2026–2027 session, the 18th legislative district of the New Jersey Legislature is represented in the State Senate by Patrick J. Diegnan (D, South Plainfield) and in the General Assembly by Robert Karabinchak (D, Edison) and Sterley Stanley (D, East Brunswick).

Middlesex County is governed by a Board of County Commissioners, whose seven members are elected at-large on a partisan basis to serve three-year terms of office on a staggered basis, with either two or three seats coming up for election each year as part of the November general election. At an annual reorganization meeting held in January, the board selects from among its members a commissioner director and deputy director. As of 2025, Middlesex County's Commissioners (with party affiliation, term-end year, and residence listed in parentheses) are:

Director Ronald G. Rios (D, Carteret, 2027), Deputy Director Shanti Narra (D, North Brunswick, 2027), Claribel A. "Clary" Azcona-Barber (D, New Brunswick, 2025), Charles Kenny (D, Woodbridge Township, 2025), Leslie Koppel (D, Monroe Township, 2026), Chanelle Scott McCullum (D, Piscataway, 2025) and Charles E. Tomaro (D, Edison, 2026).

Constitutional officers are: Clerk Nancy Pinkin (D, 2025, East Brunswick), Sheriff Mildred S. Scott (D, 2025, Piscataway) and Surrogate Claribel Cortes (D, 2026; North Brunswick).

=== Politics ===
As of April 2024, there were a total of 17,380 registered voters in South Plainfield, of which 6,217 (35.77%) were registered as Democrats, 3,667 (21.10%) were registered as Republicans and 7,315 (42.10%) were registered as Unaffiliated. There were 5 voters registered as Libertarians or Greens.

United States presidential election results for South Plainfield
Year	Republican		Democratic		Third party(ies)	
Year	No.	%	No.	%	No.	%
2024	5,697	49.20%	5,748	49.64%	135	1.17%
2020	5,446	44.34%	6,648	54.13%	188	1.53%
2016	4,742	45.25%	5,380	51.34%	358	3.42%
2012	4,043	40.93%	5,720	57.91%	114	1.15%
2008	4,797	45.13%	5,723	53.84%	110	1.03%
2004	4,808	49.22%	4,893	50.09%	67	0.69%
2000	3,751	44.51%	4,370	51.86%	306	3.63%

In the 2012 presidential election, Democrat Barack Obama received 57.9% of the vote (5,720 cast), ahead of Republican Mitt Romney with 40.9% (4,043 votes), and other candidates with 1.2% (114 votes), among the 9,974 ballots cast by the borough's 14,424 registered voters (97 ballots were spoiled), for a turnout of 69.1%. In the 2008 presidential election, Democrat Barack Obama received 53.4% of the vote (5,723 cast), ahead of Republican John McCain with 44.7% (4,797 votes) and other candidates with 1.0% (110 votes), among the 10,720 ballots cast by the borough's 14,454 registered voters, for a turnout of 74.2%. In the 2004 presidential election, Democrat John Kerry received 49.9% of the vote (4,893 ballots cast), outpolling Republican George W. Bush with 49.0% (4,808 votes) and other candidates with 0.5% (67 votes), among the 9,803 ballots cast by the borough's 13,191 registered voters, for a turnout percentage of 74.3.

Gubernatorial election results for South Plainfield
Year	Republican		Democratic		Third party(ies)	
Year	No.	%	No.	%	No.	%
2025	3,861	41.72%	5,342	57.73%	51	0.55%
2021	3,534	50.95%	3,330	48.01%	72	1.04%
2017	3,173	49.91%	3,070	48.29%	115	1.81%
2013	3,950	63.67%	2,186	35.24%	68	1.10%
2009	3,616	52.10%	2,736	39.42%	589	8.49%
2005	2,887	44.69%	3,277	50.73%	296	4.58%

In the 2013 gubernatorial election, Republican Chris Christie received 63.7% of the vote (3,950 cast), ahead of Democrat Barbara Buono with 35.2% (2,186 votes), and other candidates with 1.1% (68 votes), among the 6,289 ballots cast by the borough's 14,512 registered voters (85 ballots were spoiled), for a turnout of 43.3%. In the 2009 gubernatorial election, Republican Chris Christie received 51.6% of the vote (3,616 ballots cast), ahead of Democrat Jon Corzine with 39.0% (2,736 votes), Independent Chris Daggett with 7.6% (534 votes) and other candidates with 0.8% (55 votes), among the 7,010 ballots cast by the borough's 14,053 registered voters, yielding a 49.9% turnout.

United States Senate election results for South Plainfield1
Year	Republican		Democratic		Third party(ies)	
Year	No.	%	No.	%	No.	%
2024	5,117	46.53%	5,533	50.31%	348	3.16%
2018	4,212	47.55%	4,376	49.40%	270	3.05%
2012	3,723	40.20%	5,382	58.11%	157	1.70%
2006	3,097	46.82%	3,307	49.99%	211	3.19%

United States Senate election results for South Plainfield2
Year	Republican		Democratic		Third party(ies)	
Year	No.	%	No.	%	No.	%
2020	5,139	42.74%	6,625	55.10%	259	2.15%
2014	2,693	47.88%	2,853	50.72%	79	1.40%
2013	1,695	48.39%	1,770	50.53%	38	1.08%
2008	4,301	44.11%	5,232	53.66%	218	2.24%

== Education ==
The South Plainfield Public Schools serve students in pre-kindergarten through twelfth grade. As of the 2020–21 school year, the district, comprised of seven schools, had an enrollment of 3,400 students and 304.0 classroom teachers (on an FTE basis), for a student–teacher ratio of 11.2:1. The schools in the district (with 2020–21 enrollment data from the National Center for Education Statistics). are Franklin Elementary School with 264 students in grades K-4, John F. Kennedy Elementary School with 268 students in grades PreK-4, John E. Riley Elementary School with 333 students in grades PreK-4, Roosevelt Elementary School with 448 students in grades PreK-4, Grant School with 444 students in grades 5-6, South Plainfield Middle School with 529 students in grades 7-8 and South Plainfield High School with 1,076 students in grades 9-12.

Eighth grade students from all of Middlesex County are eligible to apply to attend the high school programs offered by the Middlesex County Magnet Schools, a county-wide vocational school district that offers full-time career and technical education at its schools in East Brunswick, Edison, Perth Amboy, Piscataway and Woodbridge Township, with no tuition charged to students for attendance.

Holy Savior Academy is a Catholic school serving students in preschool through eighth grade that operates under the supervision of Roman Catholic Diocese of Metuchen.

Al-Minhaal Academy is a private Islamic school serving students in kindergarten through twelfth grade.

Lincoln Tech's campus in South Plainfield (formerly known as Engine City Technical Institute) is an accredited, diesel technology school that was established in 1969 as a training center to accommodate the need for diesel mechanics.

== Transportation ==
=== Roads and highways ===
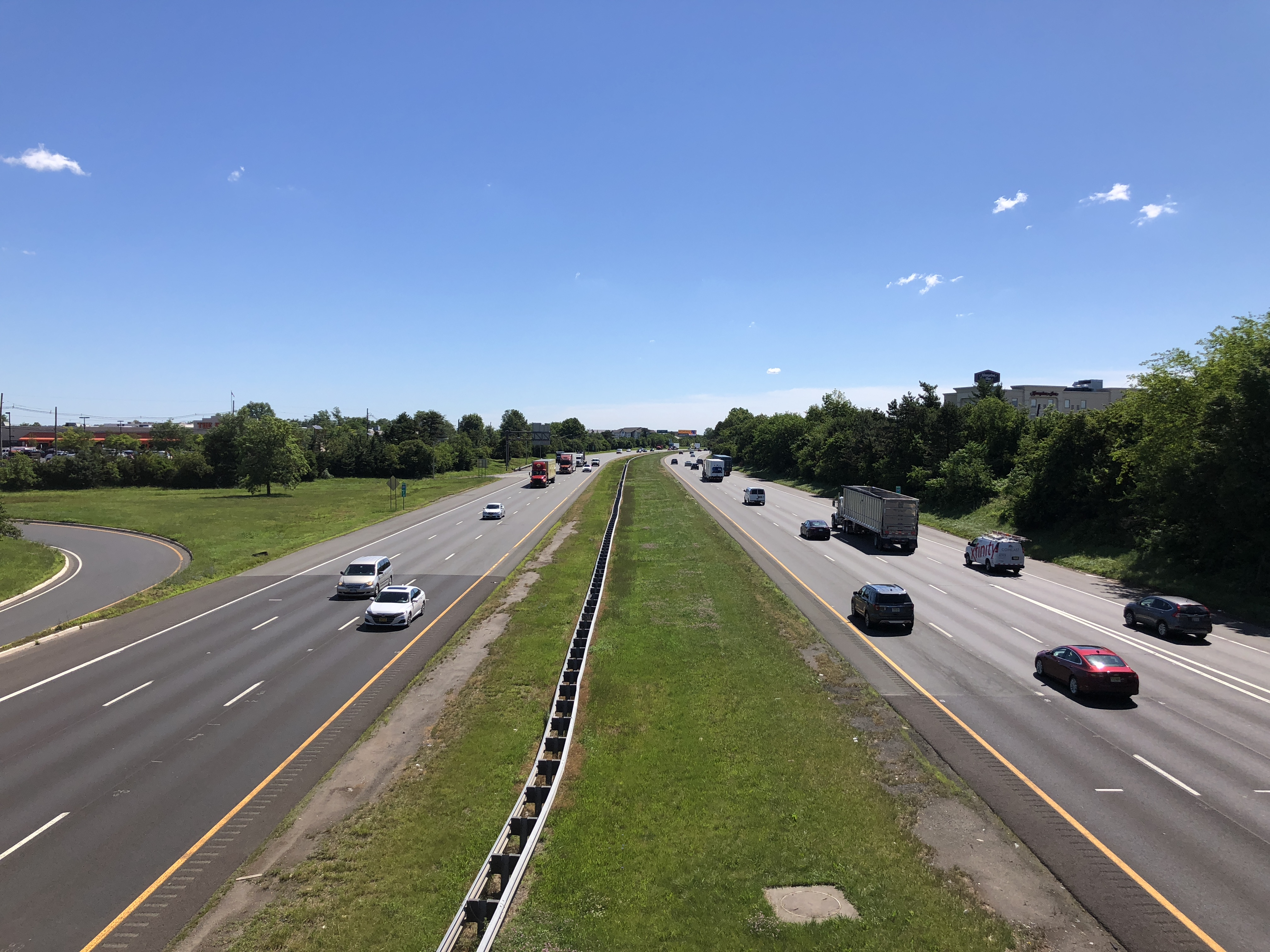
View southbound along Interstate 287 in South Plainfield

As of May 2010, the borough had a total of 108.02 miles (173.84 km) of roadways, of which 96.48 miles (155.27 km) were maintained by the municipality, 9.66 miles (15.55 km) by Middlesex County and 1.88 miles (3.03 km) by the New Jersey Department of Transportation.

Interstate 287 passes through the southern area of the borough for almost 2 miles (3.2 km), including exits 4 and 5. The New Jersey Turnpike is accessible in neighboring Edison (via I-287).

The major county roads that pass through include CR 501 (New Durham Road) along the southern border with Piscataway, CR 529 (Stelton Road) along the southwestern border with Piscataway and CR 531 (Park Avenue) along the east side of the borough, from Edison to the south to Plainfield to the north.

=== Public transportation ===
NJ Transit provided bus service between the borough and the Port Authority Bus Terminal in Midtown Manhattan on the 114 route, to Newark on the 65 route and local service on the 819 line.

== Notable people ==
People who were born in, residents of, or otherwise closely associated with South Plainfield include:

- Anthony Ashnault (born 1995), freestyle wrestler
- John Bundy, magician and magic consultant
- Patrick J. Diegnan (born 1949), represents the 18th Legislative District in the New Jersey General Assembly
- Greg Garbowsky (born 1986), bassist for Jonas Brothers
- Joshua Gomez (born 1975), appeared in the NBC series Chuck
- Rick Gomez (born 1972), actor best known for portraying Sgt. George Luz, in the HBO television miniseries Band of Brothers
- Ricky Gonzalez (born 1966), stock car racing driver
- Dontae Johnson (born 1991), cornerback for the San Francisco 49ers of the NFL
- Daniel La Spata (born 1981) politician who has served as the alderman of Chicago's 1st ward since May 2019
- Dennis Madalone (born 1954), stunt coordinator and musician, best known for his patriotic song "America We Stand As One"
- Josh Pauls (born 1992), ice sledge hockey player who was the youngest member of the U.S. National Sled Hockey Team that won the gold medal at the 2010 Winter Paralympics in Vancouver and won gold again at the 2014 Winter Paralympics in Sochi
- Michael Price (born 1958), WGA Award and Emmy Award winning writer and producer best known for his work on The Simpsons and as co-creator of the Netflix series F is for Family
- Michelle Visage (born 1968), radio DJ, singer, actress, producer, media personality, and television host who has appeared as a judge on RuPaul's Drag Race
