= James T. Plousis =

American law enforcement official (born 1958)

8th Chairman of the New Jersey Casino Control Commission
- Incumbent
- Assumed office December 26, 2017
- Appointed by: Chris Christie
- Preceded by: Matthew B. Levinson

Chairman of the New Jersey State Parole Board
- In office 2010–2017
- Appointed by: Chris Christie
- Preceded by: Peter J. Barnes Jr.
- Succeeded by: Samuel J. Plumeri Jr.

United States Marshal for the District of New Jersey
- In office 2002–2010
- Appointed by: George W. Bush

Sheriff of Cape May County
- In office 1985–2002
- Preceded by: Beech N. Fox
- Succeeded by: Raymond D. Lewis

Personal details
- Born: July 26th 1952
- Party: Republican

James T. Plousis (born 1958) is an American law enforcement official who served as the Sheriff of Cape May County, United States Marshal for the district of New Jersey, Chairman of the New Jersey State Parole Board, and the 8th Chairman New Jersey Casino Control Commission.

== Career ==
Plousis served as a police officer in the Woodbine and Ocean City police departments from 1975 through 1984. Plousis would be elected as the Sheriff of Cape May county from 1985 to 2002. Plousis would be appointed as the United States Marshal for the District of New Jersey by President George W. Bush in 2002. Plousis would be appointed to the Chairman of the New Jersey State Parole Board in 2010 by Governor Chris Christie. Plousis would be appointed as the 8th Chairman of the New Jersey Casino Control Commission in 2017 by Governor Chris Christie.

== Electoral history ==
=== Cape May County Sheriff ===
1999 Cape May County election for sheriff
Party	Candidate	Votes	%
Republican	James T. Plousis (incumbent)	16,142	69.84
Democratic	Paul T. Gass Jr.	6,970	30.16
Total votes		23,112	100%

1984 Cape May County election for sheriff
Party	Candidate	Votes	%
Republican	James T. Plousis	25,369	67.16%
Democratic	N.J. "Nick" Zagone	12,406	32.84%
Total votes		37,775	100%

Government offices
Preceded by Matthew B. Levinson	Chair of the New Jersey Casino Control Commission current	Succeeded by None
Preceded by Peter J. Barnes Jr.	Chair of the New Jersey State Parole Board; 2010-2017	Succeeded by Samuel J. Plumeri Jr.
