= Patrick J. Diegnan =

Member of the New Jersey Senate

Patrick Diegnan
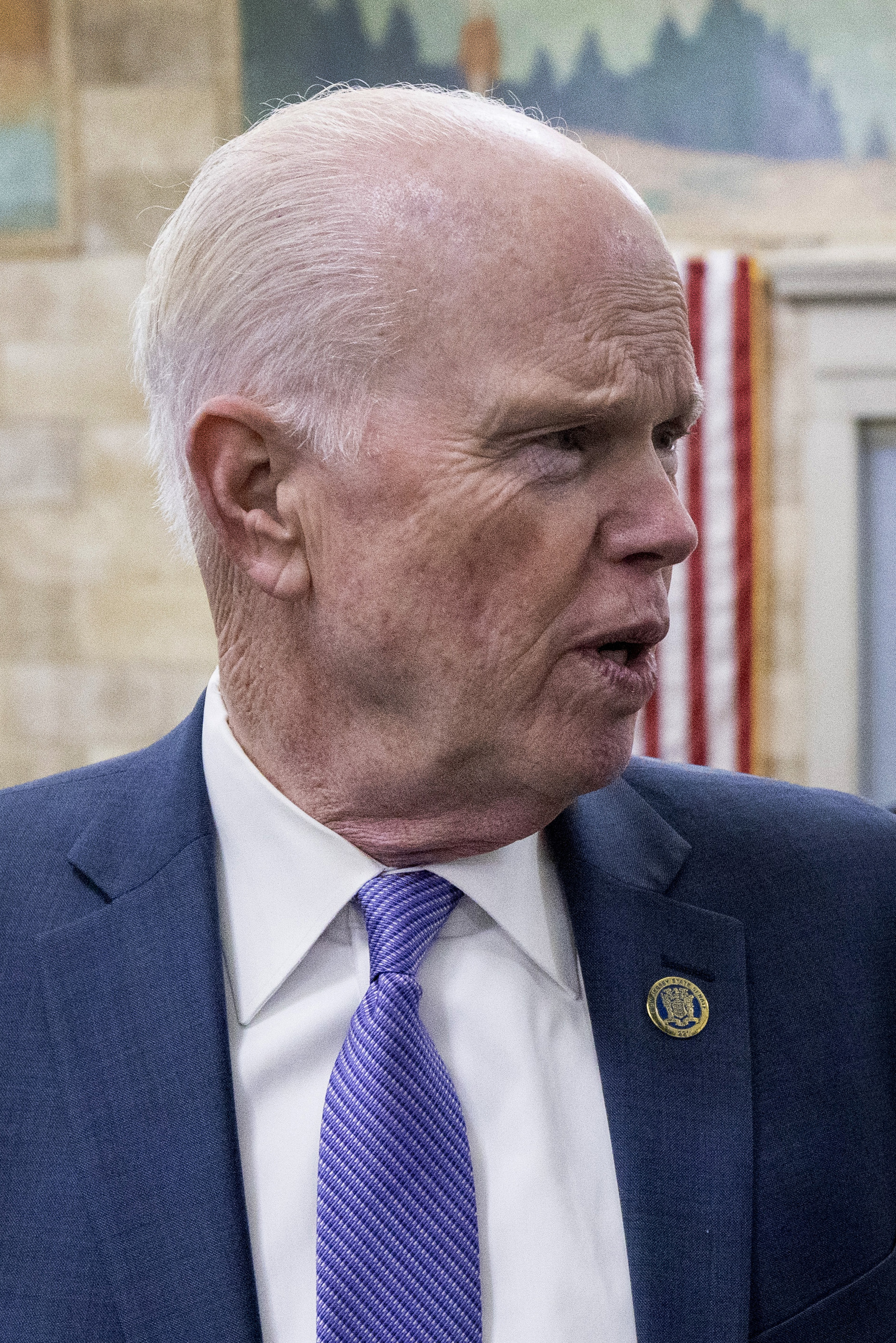

Member of the New Jersey Senate from the 18th district
- Incumbent
- Assumed office May 9, 2016
- Preceded by: Peter J. Barnes III

Member of the New Jersey General Assembly from the 18th district
- In office January 8, 2002 – May 9, 2016
- Preceded by: Barbara Buono
- Succeeded by: Robert Karabinchak

Personal details
- Born: March 19, 1949 (age 76) South Plainfield, New Jersey, U.S.
- Political party: Democratic
- Spouse: Anita Carchia Diegnan
- Children: 2
- Website: Legislative Website

Patrick J. Diegnan Jr. (born March 19, 1949) is an American lawyer and Democratic Party politician who has represented the 18th Legislative District in the New Jersey Senate since 2016.

== Early life ==
The youngest of seven children born to immigrants from Ireland, Diegnan was born and raised in South Plainfield, attending Sacred Heart Grammar School and then graduating from South Plainfield High School in 1966. Residents of South Plainfield, Diegnan and his wife Anita have been married since 1976 and have two children, Heather and Tara, along with a grandchild. Diegnan received a B.A. from Seton Hall University in Political Science / Government in 1970 and was awarded a J.D. from the Seton Hall University School of Law in 1973. Currently, Diegnan is an attorney in private practice in South Plainfield and is a member of the New Jersey and Middlesex County Bar Associations since 1974. He is also a former instructor of law and accounting at Middlesex County College. Diegnan is currently the borough attorney for Spotswood and formerly served as borough attorney for South Plainfield and Milltown.

== New Jersey Assembly ==
Diegnan was first elected to represent the 18th District in 2001 replacing Barbara Buono who had been elected to the New Jersey Senate. He was re-elected to seven more two-year terms. Diegnan served in the Assembly as Deputy Speaker (2008-2016) and Parliamentarian (2005-2016), and was Chairman of the Education Committee and a member of the Regulated Professions and Consumer Affairs Committees.

== New Jersey Senate ==
Diegnan was selected by local Democratic committee members to receive appointment to the 18th District's Senate seat on May 5, 2016, after previous seat holder Peter J. Barnes III was appointed to a judgeship on the New Jersey Superior Court. Sworn into office on May 9, Diegnan won election to the remainder of the term in November, defeating retired judge and former Middlesex County Freeholder Roger W. Daley.

=== Committees ===
Committee assignments for the 2024—2025 Legislative Session are:

- Transportation (as chair)
- Budget and Appropriations

=== District 18 ===
Each of the 40 districts in the New Jersey Legislature has one representative in the New Jersey Senate and two members in the New Jersey General Assembly. The representatives from the 18th District for the 2024—2025 Legislative Session are:

- Senator Patrick J. Diegnan (D)
- Assemblyman Robert Karabinchak (D)
- Assemblyman Sterley Stanley (D)

=== Legislative accomplishments ===
Diegnan was the primary sponsor of Assembly Bill 3331, introduced in 2003, which creates the certification of Technology Education for teachers. In 2011, he was the primary sponsor of Assembly Bill 3852, which requires voter approval at the annual school election or by the board of school estimate before a new charter school can be authorized to operate in a district. Under the existing system, the Commissioner of the New Jersey Department of Education can grant charters regardless of community opinion, with Diegnan noting that allowing voters and local boards of education a say in the granting of new schools would "help ensure that the charter schools that are created fit the needs of the community". The bill passed in the Assembly in June 2011 by a 47-17 margin.

== Electoral history ==
=== New Jersey Senate ===
18th Legislative District General Election, 2023
Party	Candidate	Votes	%
Democratic	Patrick J. Diegnan Jr. (incumbent)	24,294	64.0
Republican	Neal Shah	13,661	36.0
Total votes		37,955	100.0
Democratic hold			

18th Legislative District general election, 2021
Party	Candidate	Votes	%
Democratic	Patrick J. Diegnan (incumbent)	35,637	60.63
Republican	Vihal R. Patel	23,144	39.37
Total votes		58,781	100.0
Democratic hold			

New Jersey general election, 2017
Party	Candidate	Votes	%	±%
Democratic	Patrick J. Diegnan Jr.	32,175	65.6	▲3.9
Republican	Lewis Glogower	16,860	34.4	▼3.9
Total votes		'49,035'	'100.0'	

Special election, November 8, 2016
Party	Candidate	Votes	%	±%
Democratic	Patrick J. Diegnan Jr.	50,537	61.7	▲9.8
Republican	Roger W. Daley	31,321	38.3	▼9.8
Total votes		'81,858'	'100.0'	

=== New Jersey Assembly ===
New Jersey general election, 2015
Party	Candidate	Votes	%	±%
Democratic	Patrick J. Diegnan Jr.	16,256	31.9	▲4.8
Democratic	Nancy Pinkin	16,113	31.6	▲5.4
Republican	Teresa Rose Hutchison	9,432	18.5	▼4.8
Republican	Synnove Bakke	9,123	17.9	▼4.4
Total votes		'50,924'	'100.0'	

New Jersey general election, 2013
Party	Candidate	Votes	%	±%
Democratic	Patrick J. Diegnan Jr.	24,996	27.1	▼1.3
Democratic	Nancy Pinkin	24,186	26.2	▼2.4
Republican	Robert A. Bengivenga Jr.	21,517	23.3	▲1.3
Republican	Lisa Goldhammer	20,559	22.3	▲1.3
United We Stand	Sheila Angalet	1,068	1.2	N/A
Total votes		'92,326'	'100.0'	

New Jersey general election, 2011
Party	Candidate	Votes	%
Democratic	Peter J. Barnes, III	18,166	28.6
Democratic	Patrick J. Diegnan, Jr.	18,050	28.4
Republican	Joseph Sinagra	13,996	22.0
Republican	Marcia Silva	13,333	21.0
Total votes		63,545	100.0

New Jersey general election, 2009
Party	Candidate	Votes	%	±%
Democratic	Peter J. Barnes	26,658	25.9	▼2.5
Democratic	Patrick J. Diegnan, Jr	26,317	25.6	▼3.2
Republican	Joseph Sinagra	24,091	23.4	▲1.8
Republican	Robert Jones	22,727	22.1	▲0.9
Defending Forgotten Taxpayers	Katherine Shkolar	1,671	1.6	N/A
Defending Forgotten Taxpayers	Andrew Tidd	1,351	1.3	N/A
Total votes		'102,815'	'100.0'	

New Jersey general election, 2007
Party	Candidate	Votes	%	±%
Democratic	Patrick J. Diegnan Jr	18,858	28.8	▼0.3
Democratic	Peter J. Barnes III	18,621	28.4	▼2.4
Republican	Joseph Sinagra	14,121	21.6	▲1.5
Republican	William England	13,921	21.2	▲1.2
Total votes		'65,521'	'100.0'	

New Jersey general election, 2005
Party	Candidate	Votes	%	±%
Democratic	Peter J. Barnes Jr	31,605	30.8	▲1.2
Democratic	Patrick J. Diegnan Jr	29,874	29.1	▲2.4
Republican	Daniel Epstein	20,639	20.1	▼2.9
Republican	Frank J. Coury	20,530	20.0	▼0.7
Total votes		'102,648'	'100.0'	

New Jersey general election, 2003
Party	Candidate	Votes	%	±%
Democratic	Peter J. Barnes Jr	18,032	29.6	▼3.4
Democratic	Patrick J. Diegnan Jr	16,255	26.7	▼4.4
Republican	Robert D. Thuring	13,994	23.0	▲4.7
Republican	Jasal Amin	12,636	20.7	▲3.1
Total votes		'60,917'	'100.0'	

New Jersey general election, 2001
Party	Candidate	Votes	%
Democratic	Peter J. Barnes Jr	32,633	33.0
Democratic	Patrick Diegnan Jr	30,759	31.1
Republican	Norman J. Van Houten	18,152	18.3
Republican	Sylvester Fernandez	17,443	17.6
Total votes		98,987	100.0

New Jersey Senate
Preceded by Peter J. Barnes III	Member of the New Jersey Senate for the 18th District; May 9, 2016 – Present	Succeeded by Incumbent
New Jersey General Assembly
Preceded by Barbara Buono	Member of the New Jersey General Assembly for the 18th District; January 8, 2002 – May 9, 2016; With: Peter J. Barnes, Jr., Peter J. Barnes III, Nancy Pinkin	Succeeded by Robert Karabinchak
