= Peter J. Barnes III =

American politician (1956–2021)

Member of the New Jersey Senate from the 18th district
- In office January 14, 2014 – April 25, 2016
- Preceded by: Barbara Buono
- Succeeded by: Patrick J. Diegnan

Member of the New Jersey General Assembly from the 18th district
- In office March 15, 2007 – January 14, 2014
- Preceded by: Peter J. Barnes Jr.
- Succeeded by: Nancy Pinkin

Personal details
- Born: April 26, 1956 San Francisco, California, U.S.
- Died: February 22, 2021 (aged 64) New Brunswick, New Jersey, U.S.
- Party: Democratic
- Spouse: Katie
- Children: 3
- Education: Gettysburg College (BA); Fairleigh Dickinson University (MBA); Widener University (JD)

Peter J. Barnes III (April 26, 1956 – February 22, 2021) was an American Democratic Party politician, who served in the New Jersey Senate, where he represented the 18th Legislative District until 2016, when he was appointed New Jersey Superior Court judge. He previously served in the General Assembly from 2007 to 2014. Barnes previously served on the Assembly Judiciary Committee (as Vice-Chair), the Appropriations Committee and the Environment and Solid Waste Committee.

== Biography ==
Barnes was born in San Francisco, California, but grew up primarily in Edison, New Jersey. He attended the Edison Township Public Schools, having attended Menlo Park Elementary School, John Adams Junior High School and J. P. Stevens High School. Barnes graduated in 1978 with a B.A. from Gettysburg College in political science, a Master of Business Administration from Fairleigh Dickinson University in management in 1980, and was awarded a Juris Doctor by the Widener University School of Law in 1985.

Barnes lived in Edison. He and his wife, Katie, had three children. He served on the Edison, New Jersey Township Council from 1996 to 2007, and on the Township's Planning Board from 2001 to 2003.

Barnes entered the New Jersey General Assembly in 2007, when he succeeded his father Peter J. Barnes Jr., who was nominated by Governor Jon Corzine to serve as chairman of the New Jersey State Parole Board. On March 14, 2007, Barnes Jr. was confirmed by the New Jersey Senate and Barnes III, was chosen to fill his father's vacant seat.

On November 5, 2013, he was elected to the State Senate, succeeding Barbara Buono who was running for Governor. In one of the closest Senate races in the state, Barnes defeated Democrat-turned-Republican East Brunswick mayor David Stahl by a 4% margin. He was the only new Senator elected in the 2013 elections as incumbent Senators won in the other 39 districts.

=== Superior Court judge ===
In April 2016, Barnes was nominated by Governor Chris Christie and the New Jersey Senate voted 34–0 to give him approval to become a New Jersey Superior Court judge sitting at Middlesex County Courthouse.

=== Death ===
Barnes died from cancer at Robert Wood Johnson University Hospital in New Brunswick on February 22, 2021, at age 64.

=== Tribute ===
On August 10, 2021, the Dismal Swamp, located in Middlesex County, New Jersey, was renamed as the Peter J. Barnes III Wildlife Preserve.

== Election history ==
New Jersey State Senate elections, 2013
| Party | Candidate | Votes | % |
|---|---|---|---|
| Democratic | Peter Barnes | 25,063 | 51.9 |
| Republican | David Stahl | 23,184 | 48.1 |
| Democratic hold | | | |

New Jersey Senate
| Preceded by Barbara Buono | Member of the New Jersey Senate for the 18th District; January 14, 2014 – April 25, 2016 | Succeeded by Patrick J. Diegnan |
New Jersey General Assembly
| Preceded by Peter J. Barnes, Jr. | Member of the New Jersey General Assembly for the 18th District; March 15, 2007 – January 14, 2014; With: Patrick J. Diegnan | Succeeded by Nancy Pinkin |
