= United States v. Gotcher =

- Court: United States Court of Appeals for the Fifth Circuit
- Full case name: United States of America v. John William Gotcher, et ux
- Decided: August 27, 1968
- Citation: 401 F.2d 118

Case history
- Prior history: 259 F. Supp. 340 (E.D. Tex.)
- Subsequent history: Rehearing denied, October 28, 1968

Court membership
- Judges sitting: John R. Brown, Griffin Bell, Homer Thornberry

Case opinions
- Majority: Thornberry, joined by Brown, Bell
- Concurrence: Brown

Laws applied
- Internal Revenue Code

United States v. Gotcher, 401 F.2d 118 (5th Cir. 1968), is a tax case from the United States Court of Appeals for the Fifth Circuit.

== Facts ==
This case involved a twelve-day expense-paid trip to Germany for Mr. and Mrs. Gotcher to tour Volkswagen facilities in Germany. The trip cost $1,372.30. Mr. Gotcher’s employer, Economy Motors, paid $348.73 while the remainder, $1,023.53, was paid by Volkswagen of Germany and Volkswagen of America. Mr. and Mrs. Gotcher failed to include any part of the $1,372.30 in gross income for income tax purposes for 1960. The Commissioner of Internal Revenue assessed a tax deficiency after determining the taxpayers (the Gotchers) had realized income of $1,372.30 from the trip. The Gotchers paid the deficiency and filed suit for a refund. The district court held that the cost of the trip was not income, or in the alternative, that the cost of the trip was income and deductible as an ordinary and necessary business expense.

== Issue ==
At issue was whether the cost of the trip was taxable income to Mr. and Mrs. Gotcher under Section 61 of the Internal Revenue Code.

== Analysis and holding ==
For an item to constitute taxable income to the taxpayer, there must be economic gain to the taxpayer, and the economic gain must primarily benefit the taxpayer personally. The Gotchers received an indirect economic gain by receiving a benefit (the value of the trip) without any reduction in their wealth. The court considered the specific details of the trip, including the purpose of the trip, time spent in meetings, the location of day trips, and whether the trip was an award for past service. The court conducted this analysis for the purpose of determining whether the primary benefit of the trip was to the Gotchers or whether the primary benefit of the trip was to Volkswagen and the employers.

The court referenced Section 119 of the Internal Revenue Code, which excludes from the gross income of an employee "the value of meals and lodging furnished to him for the convenience of the employer," as guidance for the decision. The court also cited the case McDonell v. Commissioner, 26 T.C.M. 115, Tax Ct. Mem. 1967-18. McDonnell held that a taxpayer received no income when he was required by his employer to go on a business trip and that he was serving a legitimate business purpose even if he enjoyed the trip.

The Fifth Circuit reversed in part and affirmed in part the lower court decision. The court found that the agenda was related primarily to business, the details of the trip were primarily controlled by Volkswagen, and that Mr. Gotcher's attendance was prompted by business considerations, primarily, to induce Mr. Gotcher to take interest in a Volkswagen dealership when Volkswagen was attempting to expand in the United States. Thus, the primary benefit of the trip was to Volkswagen as far as Mr. Gotcher was concerned, and thus the cost of trip was not income to him.

However, the Court found that for Mrs. Gotcher, the trip was primarily a vacation. She did not attend discussions with Volkswagen or their dealers or make tours with her husband. Thus, the expenses attributable to Mrs. Gotcher should be included in Mr. Gotcher's income. Her attendance was primarily to his personal benefit, and there was no evidence on the record that her presence served a bona fide business purpose.

== Impact of decision ==
For income tax purposes, the case is notable for the articulation of the "primary benefit to the provider doctrine." If individual receives an economic gain, but the primary benefit is to the provider of the gain, then such gain is not income to the individual. The articulation of the doctrine is open to question, as almost all payments could be characterized as providing the primary benefit to the provider. A business only pays employees for the benefit of labor which will provide greater returns than expenses and contract consideration is only furnished to receive a preferred gain. However, employee income (as compensation for services) and contract consideration (as compensation for services, gains from dealings in property, and many other categories) are regularly taxed.

That this case attributes income only to Mrs. Gotcher, clearly diminishes any benefit derived from her presence in Germany to Mr. Gotcher's employer, or the Volkswagens. Although the evidence was nonexistent as to her presence being necessary to her husband’s conducting of business in this case, one can imagine other scenarios where a spouse performs significant work to advance the conducting of his or her partner's business.

Examples might include: companies that expect attendees to bring his or her spouse, partners who organize social events for other spouses while the attendees are in meetings, partners who engage in unofficial accounting, transcribing, or decision-making with his or her attendee partner, etc. The statement, "a single trip by a wife with her husband to Europe has been specifically rejected as not being the exceptional type of case justifying a deduction," has insidious ramifications for tax (and social) consequences of women (or men) that perform legitimate work on behalf of their partner or spouse. It creates a presumption wherein a partner or spouse's presence is not seen as necessary to the conducting of business.

Perhaps the concurring opinion articulates even more clearly the popular belief about women's informal work performed on behalf of their partner’s business. It states, "Attributing income to the little wife who was neither an employee, a prospective employee, nor a dealer, for the value of a trip she neither planned nor chose still bothers me."
