= Valerie H. Armstrong =

American former judge

Valerie Hance Armstrong

Assignment Judge of the New Jersey Superior Court for the 1st Vicinage
- In office 2001 – November 1, 2011
- Succeeded by: Julio Mendez

Judge of the New Jersey Superior Court Family Division
- In office October 1991 – 2000
- Appointed by: James Florio

Chair of the New Jersey Casino Control Commission (acting)
- In office 1990
- Preceded by: Walter N. Read
- Succeeded by: Steven P. Perskie

Member of the New Jersey Casino Control Commission
- In office March 29, 1985 – October 1991
- Appointed by: Thomas Kean

Judge of the New Jersey Office of Administrative Law
- In office June 1984 – February 4, 1985

Personal details
- Born: Valerie Hance
- Education: Atlantic City High School
- Alma mater: Temple University Beasley School of Law

Valerie Hance Armstrong is a retired judge of the New Jersey Superior Court.

== Education and career ==
Raised in Brigantine, New Jersey, Armstrong graduated from Atlantic City High School in 1964. She completed her undergraduate at Beaver College. Armstrong would attend the Temple University College of Music and met her future husband, John Armstrong, while attending the University of Virginia; they married in 1970. From 1970 to 1973, Armstrong taught music at Friends Select School in Philadelphia. She graduated from the Temple University Beasley School of Law.

Armstrong was a partner in the law firm of Subin, Armstrong & Armstrong in Northfield, New Jersey, from 1976 to 1984. In June 1984, Armstrong became a judge for the New Jersey Office of Administrative Law.

=== Casino Control Commission ===
Armstrong was nominated to the Casino Control Commission by Governor Thomas H. Kean on February 4, 1985, serving on the Commission on March 29, 1985. She was reappointed to a full five-year term in 1989.

In 1990, Armstrong served as acting chairperson for nine months following the resignation of former Chairman Walter N. Read and prior to the appointment of Chairman Steven P. Perskie.

Armstrong would leave the board in October 1991, following her appointment to the New Jersey Superior Court.

=== New Jersey Superior Court Judge service ===
Armstrong was appointed as a judge for the New Jersey Superior Court by Governor James Florio in 1991, serving in the family division and becoming presiding judge in 1995. Armstrong chaired the Conference of Presiding Family Judges from 1997 to 2000.

Armstrong would become assignment judge for the 1st Vicinage encompassing Cape May and Atlantic counties in 2001, until her retirement on November 1, 2011.

She and her husband have been residents of Absecon, New Jersey.

Government offices
Preceded by Walter N. Read	Acting Chair of the New Jersey Casino Control Commission; 1990	Succeeded by Steven P. Perskie
