= Internal Revenue Code section 61 =

Section 61 of the Internal Revenue Code (IRC 61, 26 U.S.C. § 61) defines "gross income", the starting point for determining which items of income are taxable for federal income tax purposes in the United States. Section 61 states that "[e]xcept as otherwise provided in this subtitle, gross income means all income from whatever source derived [ . . . ]". The United States Supreme Court has interpreted this to mean that Congress intended to exercise its full power towards taxation incomes to the extent that such taxation is permitted under Article I, Section 8, Clause 1 (the Taxing and Spending Clause) of the Constitution of the United States and under the Constitution's Sixteenth Amendment.

== Types of § 61 income ==
Section 61 lists examples of items that are taxable under the Code, including "Compensation for services, including fees, commissions, fringe benefits, and similar items"; "Gross income derived from business"; and "Gains derived from dealings in property". Other examples of income listed in section 61 include interest and dividends, rent, royalty payments, alimony payments; life insurance, pensions, and inheritances. Eligible sources of gross income may be located in section 861.

=== Compensation for services ===
Income from Compensation for services include fees, commissions, fringe benefits, and similar items. The employer may also compensate the employee-taxpayer indirectly.

A taxpayer may receive taxable income from the taxpayer's employer when the employer pays the taxpayer's taxes. In 1929, the United States Supreme Court decided the case of Old Colony Trust Co. v. Commissioner. The employer paid incomes taxes on behalf of an employee, and the Court questioned whether that payment constituted additional taxable income to the employee. The Court decided that the payment constituted income to the employee because "the discharge by a third person of an obligation to him is equivalent to receipt by the person taxed." Thus, even when a taxpayer does not directly receive compensation for services, the compensation may be considered gross income if the payment releases the taxpayer from an obligation.

The issue of whether indirect payments for services should be included in gross income arose again in McCann v. United States. In McCann, the court had to decide whether travel expenses paid by an employer to enable an employee to attend a company conference were part of the employee's gross income. The company provided the travel award to the employee for good work in increasing net sales during 1972. The court held that the travel expenses were compensation to the employee for services rendered to the company during 1972 and should be included in gross income. Therefore, when a company pays travel expenses, a taxpayer must include such compensation in gross income when the excursion is viewed as a reward for outstanding employee success within the company.

Similar to McCann, the issue in United States v. Gotcher involved an expense-paid trip. The employer paid for the employee to travel to Germany to induce the employee to undertake further business endeavors. The court held that the employee's expenses paid by the employer were not gross income because the "indirect economic gain [to the employee was] subordinate to an overall business purpose." However, the court found that the employee's wife, who accompanied her husband on the trip, incurred gross income because the wife's trip was primarily a vacation. As such, a taxpayer does not acquire gross income from an expense-paid trip provided by the employer when the primary and overall purpose relates to business interests.

=== Business income ===
Gross income derived from business

=== Discharge of Indebtedness ===
One form of income listed in the Code, that of "discharge of indebtedness" is not often considered income by lay persons. If, however, a taxpayer owes a debt to any other party, and that debt is forgiven without being fully repaid, the taxpayer must as a general rule declare the forgiven amount as income, and must pay tax on it.

=== Passive income ===
capital gain, interest and dividends, royalty payments

=== Other ===
life insurance, alimony payments, pensions, and inheritances, rent

== See also ==
- Internal Revenue Service
- Taxation in the United States
- Zarin v. Commissioner
