= Engine City Technical Institute =

Coordinates: 40.551163°N 74.420915°W

Engine City Technical Institute is a for-profit college focused on diesel technology and located in South Plainfield, Middlesex County, New Jersey, United States, a short distance off of Interstate 287.

== History ==
Engine City was founded in Union, New Jersey, in 1969 as a training center to accommodate the need for diesel mechanics in New Jersey and the surrounding areas.

== Curriculum ==
Engine City uses a nine-week "phase system", where a student will attend the same class, five hours a day,(morning or afternoon) five days a week, for nine weeks before moving onto the next class. Program length is typically about 13 months. The classes are as follows (not all students take the same classes in the same order):

- Drive-Train: The student trains on various transmissions and rear-end carriers for light- through heavy-duty applications. Transmissions typically worked on are New Process, Spicer, and Eaton-Fuller Road-Ranger transmissions, the most common in the heavy-duty truck industry today.
- Basic Engine: The student learns about the all basic components of a diesel engine, such as the cylinder block, cylinder head, pistons, and crankshaft,(to name a few). In the shop, the student will completely disassemble, clean, measure, reassemble, and run a four-cylinder Isuzu Thermo-King generator/refrigeration engine, as well as do minor tune-up tasks on standard straight-6 heavy-duty engines.
- Chassis: A heavily shop-intensive course, the student will learn safe tire removal and replacement, hub service and types, wheel bearing service and adjustment, brake service, clutch replacement, front and rear suspension repair and maintenance, air-system maintenance, and preventive maintenance schedules used by many well known transportation fleets.
- Electrical: A more classroom course than the other phases, the electrical class reviews basic electric theory, teaches use of multimeter, starting and charging systems, engine and non-engine related electronic troubleshooting, schematic tracing, and sensor and actuator theory and operation. Trucks in the shop are used for real time projects.
- Fuel Systems: A continuation of the Basic Engine course, this class requires both Basic Engine and Electrical as prerequisites. The student will learn in-depth information on fuel system troubleshooting on both all-mechanical and electronically governed diesel engines, performing both basic maintenance and advanced troubleshooting tasks on Detroit Diesel, Caterpillar, and Cummins engines, both on separate engine stands and in actual trucks.
- Advanced Shop: An almost entirely shop-oriented course and typically the student's last stop before graduation, Advanced Shop sets the student on live trucks and extremely advanced tasks, such as removing, overhauling, and reinstalling the engine successfully into a truck. Live projects are also used for training. Transmission, suspension, hydraulic, etc. projects are available. Students are also given some degree of freedom in learning how to cut and weld. Stick welding, gas welding, wire feed welding, as well as the proper use of a gas torch and plasma cutter are covered. Students fabricate various stands, (for engines and other devices).

== Affiliations ==
Engine City currently employs as instructors two former Cummins Techs of the Year, and as such have an extremely strong relationship with Cummins. Engine City also has a strong relationship with Binder as a result of Binder's head trainer being a graduate of the school. Only one individual teaches training programs at Foley CAT, a major Caterpillar dealership. Unfortunately, Engine City has not been able to secure any relationship with Volvo Trucks or Mack Trucks beyond Mack sending several second-hand transmissions and rears to the Drive-Train shop.

== The future ==
There are two major potential directions that Engine City's administration is considering taking. The first direction would be to convert their current facility in South Plainfield into an automotive motorcycle training facility, while purchasing a larger building to house the heavy-duty facility, as space is quite scarce in the current facility's bays.

The second direction would be to become a CAT affiliate and a training center for Caterpillar technicians, eliminating most of the current curriculum that deals with non-Caterpillar technology, while providing CAT with a source of trained and refined techs.

As of January 2009, Engine City Technical Institute - Diesel Mechanics School and Training Center has been acquired by Lincoln Education Corporation. This corporation operates over 100 schools throughout the U.S. This acquisition will serve as Lincoln Groups diesel mechanics school for the tri state area. This acquisition will also allow Engine City Technical Institute to purchase more equipment to service its growing student population.
