= Walter Newton Read =

American lawyer (1918-2001)

2nd Chairman of the New Jersey Casino Control Commission
- In office 1982–1989
- Appointed by: Thomas Kean
- Preceded by: Don M. Thomas (acting)
- Succeeded by: Valerie H. Armstrong (acting)

Personal details
- Born: February 8, 1918 Camden, New Jersey, US
- Died: December 22, 2001 (aged 83) Cinnaminson Township, New Jersey, US
- Party: Republican
- Parent: William T. Read (father)
- Education: University of Pennsylvania; University of Pennsylvania Law School
- Website: http://www.nj.gov/casinos/about/history/read.html
- Nickname: Bud

Military service
- Allegiance: United States
- Branch/service: United States Navy
- Years of service: 1942-1962
- Rank: Lieutenant commander
- Unit: United States Navy Reserve
- Battles/wars: World War II

Walter Newton "Bud" Read (February 8, 1918 – December 22, 2001) was an American lawyer and the second chairman of the New Jersey Casino Control Commission, from 1982 to 1989.

== Biography ==
Read, whose nickname was "Bud," was born on February 8, 1918, in Camden, New Jersey. Read graduated from the University of Pennsylvania in 1939 and from University of Pennsylvania Law School in 1941. He served as a naval officer in World War II and retired from the United States Naval Reserve in 1962 with the rank of lieutenant commander.

Read was a partner in the law firm Archer, Greiner & Read. He left the firm in 1982 to accept appointment by Governor Thomas Kean as chairman of the New Jersey Casino Control Commission.

Read died on December 22, 2001, at his home in Cinnaminson Township, New Jersey, at the age of 83 from cancer. Read's father, William T. Read, served as New Jersey State Treasurer and a State Senator.

Government offices
Preceded by Don M. Thomas (acting)	Chair of the New Jersey Casino Control Commission; 1982–1989	Succeeded by Valerie H. Armstrong (acting)
