= Peter J. Barnes Jr. =

American politician

Chairman of the New Jersey State Parole Board
- In office March 14, 2007 – 2010
- Appointed by: Jon Corzine
- Preceded by: John D'Amico Jr.
- Succeeded by: James T. Plousis

Member of the New Jersey General Assembly from the 18th legislative district district
- In office January 9, 1996 – March 14, 2007
- Preceded by: Jeffrey A. Warsh
- Succeeded by: Peter J. Barnes III
Assembly positions
Assembly Majority Whip
In office
2002–2007

Personal details
- Born: September 12, 1928 East Providence, Rhode Island, U.S.
- Died: September 11, 2018 (aged 89) Edison, U.S.
- Party: Democratic
- Spouse: Barbara Barnes
- Children: 4, including Peter III
- Education: Providence College (B.A.)

Military service
- Allegiance: United States
- Branch/service: United States Army
- Years of service: 1946-1948
- Rank: Private First Class
- Unit: Military Police

Peter Joseph Barnes Jr. (September 12, 1928 – September 11, 2018) was an American Democratic Party politician, who had served as Chairman of the New Jersey State Parole Board from March 2007 to 2010. He previously served in New Jersey's General Assembly from 1996 to 2007, where he represented the 18th legislative district. In the Assembly, he served as the Majority Whip from 2002 to 2007.

== Biography and early career ==
Barnes served in the United States Army from 1946 to 1948 as a Private First Class in the Military Police. Barnes received a B.A. from Providence College in Political Science. He has done Post-Baccalaureate work at Kean College in Public Administration. He is also a graduate of the F.B.I. Crime Resistance and Hostage Negotiating Schools and of the F.B.I. Management Training Program.

At age 25, Barnes was hired as a Special Agent for the Federal Bureau of Investigation (F.B.I.) where he served as an Assistant Senior Supervisory Agent and was responsible for investigating numerous violations of Federal Criminal Statutes.

In his first year, 1954, Barnes was assigned to F.B.I. San Francisco, where he served until 1957. During his time there, he investigated cases involving bank robberies, Soviet espionage, and kidnappings. In 1956, he worked on the Stephanie Bryant kidnapping case, which at that time was the most prominent kidnapping case the State of California had ever seen.

In 1958, Barnes was transferred to New Jersey, where he worked at F.B.I. Headquarters in Newark. He would spend the rest of his F.B.I. career in New Jersey, working at the F.B.I. New Brunswick and ending his career in 1980 at F.B.I. Piscataway. While in New Jersey, he was responsible for investigating cases involving white-collar crime, bank robberies, and internal security.

In 1981, Barnes became the Director of Security for the New Jersey Devils Hockey Team where he served until 1995.

Barnes began his public service in 1991 by serving as the Director of Public Safety in Edison, New Jersey. Only six months into his new position, Barnes led the Edison Police Department as it engaged in a two-day hostage standoff with John Arias, a 22-year-old Connecticut man. On June 1, 1991, The New York Times reported that Arias went to the home of his 20-year-old former girlfriend who had recently filed sexual assault charges against him, shot her four times, then locked himself in her Edison home where he killed the woman's mother, 38, and took her 9-year-old brother hostage.

With his F.B.I. training, Barnes ran the hostage negotiating team, which included one-on-one telephone contact with the hostage taker, Mr. Arias. The situation concluded one-day later at 7 p.m. when Barnes and his Deputy Chief, Anthony Calomoneri, were determined to "lay it on the line and get tough." They decided to send an armed personnel carrier rumbling up toward the house in an effort to scare the suspect into surrendering. Clearly shaken by this maneuver, John Arias phoned the police and said, "I'll be out in five seconds. Let me put my shoes on." The boy followed and was unharmed. Arias was subsequently sentenced to Life in Prison plus 50 years. He will not be eligible for parole until 2041.

Barnes remained the Director of Public Safety in Edison until 1993.

Following, he served East Brunswick as Director of Public Safety in 1997. He then returned again in 2005. Both times, he served the Township in an unpaid capacity.

== Political career ==
Barnes was first elected to the General Assembly in 1995 alongside recently elected Barbara Buono defeating incumbent Republican Jeffrey A. Warsh and his running mate x. Barnes served on the Assembly Law and Public Safety Committee (Chair), the Assembly Regulatory Oversight Committee and the Human Services Committee. During his tenure in the Assembly, Barnes was the primary sponsor of 62 bills that were signed into law.

He authored several major pieces of legislation, including a landmark bill that was signed into law in 2004 creating the New Jersey Commission to Review Criminal Sentencing. This research outlet is composed of key representatives of the criminal justice system, who serve without compensation, and is charged with promoting sound sentencing policy founded on the basic principles of public safety, proportionality and fairness. After conducting empirically-based research, this deliberative body is charged with making recommendations to the Legislature on appropriate amendments to the State's sentencing code.

To honor the death of New Brunswick Deputy Fire Chief Jimmy D'heron, who was killed in the line of duty on September 3, 2004, Barnes also introduced a bill that was signed into law in 2006, which established certain hiring preferences for the children of firefighters and law enforcement officers killed in the line of duty. In June 2006, Michael D'heron, Jimmy's son, was hired by the New Brunswick Fire Department. For the Assemblyman's efforts, he was honored by the Professional Firefighters Association of New Jersey.

Barnes also sponsored legislation that created stricter regulation of unlicensed, unsupervised, and untrained bounty hunters; created a law aimed at keeping common bomb-making materials away from terrorists; and given state and local law enforcement officers more tools to investigate online sex crimes against children.

Before resigning his seat, the Assemblyman introduced a controversial piece of legislation, Assembly Bill 2877, which would have reduced drug-free school and public property zones from 1,000 to 200 feet. This bill was introduced in response to a report issued by a blue-ribbon panel, the New Jersey Commission to Review Criminal Sentencing, which strongly argued that the current drug-free school zone laws do not serve as the deterrent that they were purported to be. While this legislation remains the subject of some debate, it has received praise from the editorial page of The Star-Ledger, New Jersey's largest newspaper. In addition, this report and subsequent legislation generated national attention and was reported in a variety of national daily newspapers.

On February 5, 2007, Governor of New Jersey Jon Corzine nominated Barnes to serve as Chairman of the New Jersey State Parole Board. In mid-March, he resigned his Assembly seat to assume the Parole Board Chairmanship. On March 14, 2007, Barnes was confirmed by the New Jersey Senate and Barnes' son, Edison Councilman Peter J. Barnes III, was chosen to fill his father's vacant seat.

== Electoral history ==
=== General Assembly ===
18th Legislative District General Election, 1995
Party	Candidate	Votes	%
Democratic	Barbara Buono (incumbent)	20,530	26.61
Democratic	Peter J. Barnes Jr.	19,531	25.32
Republican	Jeffrey A. Warsh (incumbent)	17,941	23.26
Republican	D. Jane Tousman	16,790	21.76
Independent	Frank J. Coury	2,351	3.05
Total votes		77,143	100.0
Democratic hold			

== Personal life ==
Barnes resided with his wife Barbara in Edison, New Jersey. He had four children including Peter III who succeeded Barnes in the Assembly, John Patrick a former Hunterdon County, New Jersey prosecutor, Sheila, and Kelly. Barnes died on September 11, 2018, one day shy of his 90th birthday.
