= Robert Karabinchak =

American politician

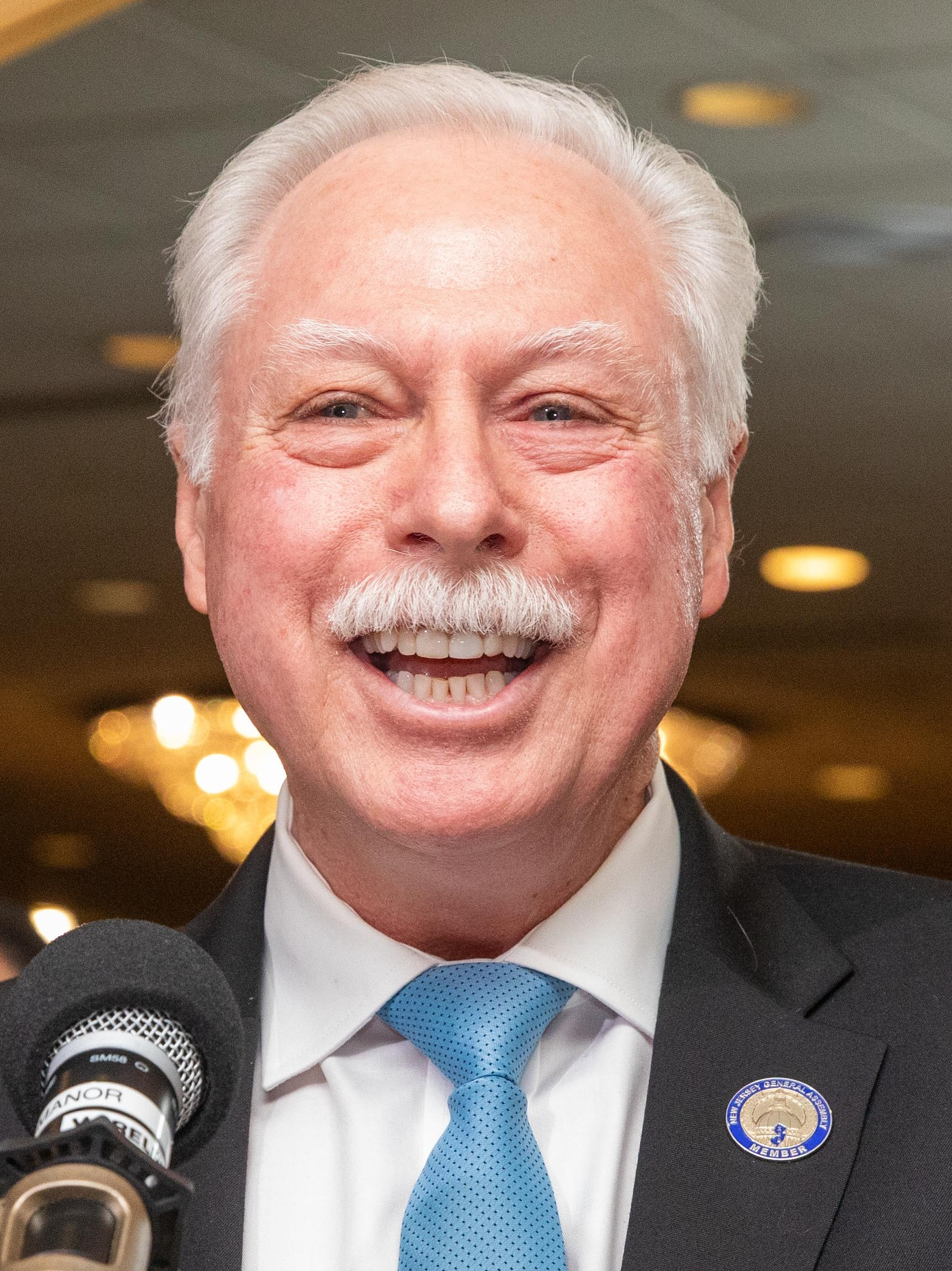
- Karabinchak in 2025

Member of the New Jersey General Assembly from the 18th district
- Incumbent
- Assumed office May 26, 2016 Serving with Sterley Stanley
- Preceded by: Patrick J. Diegnan

Deputy Assembly Whip
- Incumbent
- Assumed office January 9, 2018
- Preceded by: Position Established

Personal details
- Born: Robert Karabinchak; April 11, 1956 (age 70) Rosenheim, Bavaria, West Germany
- Party: Democratic
- Children: 3
- Website: Legislative Webpage

Robert J. Karabinchak (born April 11, 1956) is an American politician and member of the Democratic Party. He has represented District 18 in the New Jersey General Assembly since May 2016.

== New Jersey Assembly ==
Karabinchak served on the Edison Zoning Board of Adjustment and on the township council for eight years, in 2007, and again from 2009, until being sworn into the General Assembly on May 26, 2016 to fill the unexpired term of Senator Patrick J. Diegnan. Diegnan replaced Senator Peter J. Barnes III upon his appointment to the New Jersey Superior Court.

Before representing the 18th Legislative District, he was in Edison Township government for 16 years. This included eight years on the Zoning Board of Adjustment, and eight years on the Township Council as Councilmember, before becoming Council President. Additionally, Assemblyman Karabinchak served as a member of the council’s Finance, Open Space and Master Plan committees. He is a former Middlesex County Utilities Authority commissioner. Karabinchak is a lifelong resident of Edison, where he is a local business owner, working as President of Triform Construction in Metuchen.

=== Committees ===
Committee assignments for the 2024—2025 Legislative Session are:

- State and Local Government (as chair)
- Commerce, Economic Development and Agriculture
- Transportation and Independent Authorities

=== District 18 ===
Each of the 40 districts in the New Jersey Legislature has one representative in the New Jersey Senate and two members in the New Jersey General Assembly. The representatives from the 18th District for the 2024—2025 Legislative Session are:

- Senator Patrick J. Diegnan (D)
- Assemblyman Robert Karabinchak (D)
- Assemblyman Sterley Stanley (D)

== Electoral history ==
=== New Jersey Assembly ===
18th Legislative District General Election, 2023
Party	Candidate	Votes	%
Democratic	Robert Karabinchak (incumbent)	23,362	31.5
Democratic	Sterley Stanley (incumbent)	23,236	31.4
Republican	Teresa Hutchison	13,861	18.7
Republican	Joseph Wolak	13,619	18.4
Total votes		74,078	100.0
Democratic hold			
Democratic hold			

18th legislative district general election, 2021
Party	Candidate	Votes	%
Democratic	Robert Karabinchak (incumbent)	33,685	29.27%
Democratic	Sterley Stanley (incumbent)	32,743	28.45%
Republican	Melanie McCann Mott	23,940	20.80%
Republican	Angela Fam	23,248	20.20%
Libertarian	David Awad	741	0.64%
An Inspired Advocate	Brian P. Kulas	729	0.63%
Total votes		115,086	100.0
Democratic hold			

New Jersey General Assembly elections, 2019
Party	Candidate	Votes	%
Democratic	Nancy Pinkin (incumbent)	19,431	30.6
Democratic	Robert Karabinchak (incumbent)	18,727	29.49
Republican	Robert Bengivenga	13,002	20.47
Republican	Jeffrey Brown	12,349	19.4

New Jersey General Assembly elections, 2017
Party	Candidate	Votes	%
Democratic	Nancy Pinkin (incumbent)	25,526	32.0
Democratic	Robert Karabinchak (incumbent)	24,786	31.0
Republican	April Bengivenga	15,344	19.0
Republican	Jimmy Hu	14,255	18.0

Special election, November 8, 2016
Party	Candidate	Votes	%
Democratic	Robert Karabinchak	48,513	60.4
Republican	Camille Ferraro Clark	31,827	39.6
Total votes		80,340	100.0

New Jersey General Assembly
Preceded by Patrick J. Diegnan	Member of the New Jersey General Assembly for the 18th District; May 26, 2016-Present; With: Sterley Stanley	Succeeded by Incumbent
