= Sterley Stanley =

American politician and businessman

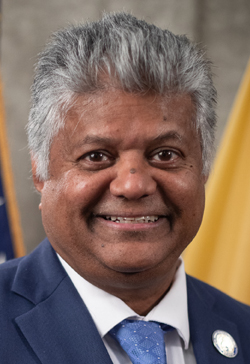

Member of the New Jersey General Assembly from the 18th district
- Incumbent
- Assumed office January 27, 2021 Serving with Robert Karabinchak
- Preceded by: Nancy Pinkin

Deputy Parliamentarian for the New Jersey General Assembly
- In office January 2024 – Present

Chair of the Assembly Regulated Professions Committee for the New Jersey General Assembly
- In office January 2024 – Present
- Preceded by: Thomas P. Giblin

Personal details
- Born: June 24, 1966 (age 60) Karnataka, India
- Party: Democratic
- Children: Selena Ruth Stanley, Silias Stanley, Supna Stanley
- Website: Legislative webpage

Sterley Stanley (born June 24, 1966) is an American politician and businessman serving as a member of the New Jersey General Assembly from the 18th district. He assumed office on January 27, 2021, succeeding Nancy Pinkin.

== Early life ==
Born in Karnataka, India, Stanley emigrated as a child to Brooklyn, where he graduated from Xaverian High School in 1984. He later relocated to East Brunswick, New Jersey.

== Career ==
Prior to entering politics, he worked in the insurance and financial services industry. Stanley began his career in politics when he was elected to serve as a member of the East Brunswick township council where he also served as Council President.

=== New Jersey General Assembly ===
Assemblyman Stanley was elected by a special convention of Middlesex County Democratic County Committee-Members to the New Jersey General Assembly and assumed office on January 27, 2021, succeeding Nancy Pinkin, who had resigned from office to assume the office of County Clerk for Middlesex County. Stanley is the first Asian-American legislator to be elected to represent the 18th Legislative district, which is home to the largest concentration of Asian Americans in New Jersey and the highest concentration of Indian Americans in the United States.

=== Committees ===
Committee assignments for the 2024—2025 Legislative Session are:

- Chairman of the Assembly Regulated Professions Committee (ARP)
- Vice-Chairman of the Assembly Education Committee (AED)
- Member of the Assembly Financial Institutions & Insurance Committee (AFI)

=== District 18 ===
New Jersey's 18th Legislative District represents the Middlesex County municipalities of East Brunswick, Edison, Highland Park, Metuchen, Milltown, South Plainfield and South River. Each of the 40 districts in the New Jersey Legislature has one representative in the New Jersey Senate and two members in the New Jersey General Assembly. The representatives from the 18th District for the 2024—2025 Legislative Session are:

- Senator Patrick J. Diegnan (D)
- Assemblyman Robert Karabinchak (D)
- Assemblyman Sterley Stanley (D)

== Electoral history ==
18th Legislative District General Election, 2023
Party	Candidate	Votes	%
Democratic	Robert Karabinchak (incumbent)	23,362	31.5
Democratic	Sterley Stanley (incumbent)	23,236	31.4
Republican	Teresa Hutchison	13,861	18.7
Republican	Joseph Wolak	13,619	18.4
Total votes		74,078	100.0
Democratic hold			
Democratic hold			

18th legislative district general election, 2021
Party	Candidate	Votes	%
Democratic	Robert Karabinchak (incumbent)	33,685	29.27%
Democratic	Sterley Stanley (incumbent)	32,743	28.45%
Republican	Melanie McCann Mott	23,940	20.80%
Republican	Angela Fam	23,248	20.20%
Libertarian	David Awad	741	0.64%
An Inspired Advocate	Brian P. Kulas	729	0.63%
Total votes		115,086	100.0
Democratic hold			

== See also ==
- Indians in the New York City metropolitan area
