= New Jersey Casino Control Commission =

American government agency

State of New Jersey Casino Control Commission

Agency overview
- Formed: 1977
- Jurisdiction: New Jersey
- Headquarters: Tennessee Avenue & Boardwalk Atlantic City, NJ 08401
- Agency executives: James T. Plousis, Chairman; Sharon Anne Harrington, Vice Chair; Alisa Cooper, Commissioner
- Website: nj.gov/casinos

The Casino Control Commission is a New Jersey state governmental agency that was founded in 1977 as the state's Gaming Control Board, responsible under the Casino Control Act for licensing casinos in Atlantic City. The commission also issues licenses for casino key employees and hears appeals from decisions of the New Jersey Division of Gaming Enforcement. The commission is headquartered in the Arcade Building at Tennessee Avenue and Boardwalk in Atlantic City.

On November 15, 2010, State Senators Jim Whelan (D-2nd) and Raymond Lesniak (D-20th) introduced Senate Bill S12 to change the New Jersey Casino Control Act and deregulate the Atlantic City casino industry to improve competitiveness with casinos in other states. The bill would also transfer day-to-day regulatory functions from the Casino Control Commission to the Division of Gaming Enforcement. After hearings in both houses of the Legislature, the bill was approved on January 10, 2011, and signed into law by Governor Chris Christie on February 1, 2011.

The new law eliminated the requirement for the commission to have inspectors in casinos around-the-clock and made the Division of Gaming Enforcement responsible for certifying gaming revenue. The Division of Gaming Enforcement also took over responsibility for registering casino employees and non-gaming vendors, licensing gaming vendors, and handling all patron complaints.

== Commissioners ==
The Casino Control Commission consists of three members appointed by the Governor of New Jersey with advice and consent of the New Jersey Senate. The number of commissioners was reduced from five on January 17, 2012.

Commissioners serve staggered, five-year terms and can only be removed for cause. By law, no more than two commissioners can be of the same political party, a requirement that is intended to ensure political balance on the panel.

One commissioner is appointed by the Governor to also serve as a member of the Casino Reinvestment Development Authority (CRDA). A second commissioner may be appointed by the Governor to serve as a member of the CRDA in lieu of the commissioner of the Department of Commerce and Economic Development or the Department of Community Affairs.

Since December 26, 2017, James T. Plousis is the eighth chairman of the commission. He was appointed by then-Governor Chris Christie.

=== List of Chairmen ===
Chairmen of the Casino Control Commission
No.	Name	Took office	Left office	Governor
1.	Joseph P. Lordi	1977	1981	Brendan Byrne
	Martin B. Danziger (Acting Chairman)	1981	1982	
	Don M. Thomas (Acting Chairman)	1982	1982	
2.	Walter N. Read	1982	1990	Thomas Kean
	Valerie H. Armstrong (Acting Chairman)	1990	1990	
3.	Steven P. Perskie	1990	1994	James Florio
	James R. Hurley (acting Chairman)	1994	1994	
4.	Bradford S. Smith	1994	1998	Christine Todd Whitman
5.	James R. Hurley	1998	2002	Christine Todd Whitman; Donald DiFrancesco; John Farmer Jr. John O. Bennett; Richard Codey; Jim McGreevey
	Michael Arthur Fedorko (Acting Chairman)	2002	2002	
6.	Linda M. Kassekert	2002	2012	Jim McGreevey; Richard Codey; Jon Corzine; Chris Christie
7.	Matthew B. Levinson	2012	2017	Chris Christie
8.	James T. Plousis	2017	incumbent	Chris Christie; Phil Murphy

=== Notable former commissioners ===
- Leanna Brown, 1993–1999
- Frank J. Dodd, 1989–1993

== Divisions ==
- Commissioners' Office
- General Counsel's Office
- Chief of Staff Office

== Notable litigation ==
- Brown v. Hotel and Restaurant Employees (1984)
- Zarin v. Commissioner (3d Cir. 1990)

== Notable cases ==
- In 1979, the CCC ordered Clifford S. Perlman and Stuart Perlman to sever themselves from Caesars World.
- In 1979, a license was denied to Bally Manufacturing board chairman William T. O’Donnell.
- In 1982, a permanent license was denied to Hugh Hefner and Playboy Enterprises.
- In 1985, a license was denied to Barron Hilton and Hilton Hotels Corporation.
- In 1989, the casino at the Atlantis Hotel and Casino was forced to close.
- In 2007, the Tropicana Hotel & Casino was denied a renewal of its license.
- In 2010, the CCC approved a settlement between the New Jersey Division of Gaming Enforcement and MGM Mirage, whereby MGM relinquished its 50% ownership in the Borgata Hotel Casino. This was in connection with MGM's partnership in a Macau casino with Pansy Ho, who was found to be unsuitable.
- In 2014, the CCC approved MGM Resorts International for a statement of compliance and reacquire its 50% stake in the Borgata Hotel Casino, all because Pansy Ho is no longer a majority shareholder in the Macau casino. This allows MGM to reenter the Atlantic City market.
