= Zarin v. Commissioner =

Court of Appeals case

- Court: United States Court of Appeals for the Third Circuit
- Full case name: David & Louise Zarin v. Commissioner of Internal Revenue
- Argued: August 20, 1990
- Decided: October 10, 1990
- Citations: 916 F.2d 110; 66 A.F.T.R.2d 90-5679, 59 USLW 2256, 90-2; USTC (CCH) ¶ 50,530

Court membership
- Judges sitting: Walter King Stapleton, Robert E. Cowen, Joseph F. Weis Jr.

Case opinions
- Majority: Cowen, joined by Weis
- Dissent: Stapleton

Laws applied
- Internal Revenue Code

Keywords
- Cancellation of debt

Zarin v. Commissioner, 916 F.2d 110 (3rd Cir. 1990) is a United States Third Circuit Court of Appeals decision concerning the cancellation of debt and the tax consequences for the borrower for U.S. federal income tax purposes.

== Background ==
Resorts International Hotel & Casino ("Resorts"), a casino in Atlantic City, New Jersey, granted David Zarin ("Zarin"), a housing developer and (it would later prove) gambling addict, a credit line of $10,000 in June, 1978. Pursuant to this arrangement, Zarin could write a check ("marker") and in return receive chips in order to gamble at the casino's tables; Zarin would almost invariably play craps. Over time Resorts regularly increased his credit line, and by November, 1979, Zarin's permanent line of credit had reached $200,000. The New Jersey Division of Gaming Enforcement filed with the New Jersey Casino Control Commission a complaint against Resorts in response to allegations of credit abuse. Subsequently, a Casino Control Commissioner issued an Emergency Order which made further credit extensions to Zarin illegal. Nevertheless, Resorts continued to extend Zarin's credit limit. In April, 1980, Zarin delivered personal checks and counterchecks to Resorts which were returned as having been drawn against insufficient funds. Those dishonored checks totaled $3,435,000. In response, Resorts cut off Zarin's credit and filed action in New Jersey state court. Resorts and Zarin settled their dispute for a total of $500,000.

The Commissioner subsequently determined deficiencies in Zarin's federal income taxes, arguing that Zarin had recognized $2,935,000 of income in 1981 from the cancellation of indebtedness which resulted from the settlement with Resorts. The Tax Court agreed with the Commissioner.

=== Issues ===
The sole issue before the Court was whether the Tax Court correctly held that Zarin had income from the discharge of his indebtedness.

== Holding ==
Zarin realized no income from the settlement for two reasons. First, the Federal Income Tax Code provisions covering discharge of debt were inapplicable since the situation failed to meet the definitional requirements of section 108(d)(1). Second, the settlement of Zarin's gambling debts constituted a "contested liability."

=== Court's reasoning ===
The court concluded that section 61(a)(12) and section 108 of the Internal Revenue Code set forth the general rule that gross income includes income from the discharge of indebtedness. However, the court held that neither of those sections applied to the case at hand. Section 108(d)(1), which repeats and further elaborates the rule set forth in section 61(a)(12), defines the term indebtedness as any indebtedness "(A) for which the taxpayer is liable, or (B) subject to which the taxpayer holds property." The court held that neither prong of section 108(d)(1) was satisfied in the case, and, as a result, Zarin could not have income from the discharge of his debt.

According to the court (and critical to their decision), the debt was unenforceable as a matter of New Jersey law because of the Emergency Order issued by the New Jersey Casino Control Commission. As a result, the credit line was clearly not debt "for which the taxpayer is liable." Furthermore, the Court held that the gambling chips were not property but "merely an accounting mechanism to evidence debt." Zarin could not do with the chips as he pleased, nor did the chips have any independent economic value beyond the casino. Additionally, since Zarin's debt at all times equaled or exceeded the number of chips he possessed, redemption would have left Zarin with no chips or cash. The court concluded that Zarin's indebtedness was not subject to property held by the taxpayer.

The court further held that the proper approach to the case was to view it as disputed debt or "contested liability." Under the contested liability doctrine, if a taxpayer, in good faith, disputed the amount of debt, a subsequent settlement would be treated as the amount of debt cognizable for tax purposes. "The excess of the original debt over the amount determined to have been due is disregarded for both loss and debt accounting purposes." Following this doctrine, the court concluded that the $500,000 settlement fixed the amount of loss and debt cognizable for tax purposes.

=== Dissent ===
The dissent argued that Zarin held property in the gambling chips issued by Resorts. According to the dissent, Zarin wished to purchase what Resorts was offering in the marketplace, and Resorts provided Zarin with chips instead of cash to entitle him to gamble in Resorts' casino. "Zarin received either $3.4 million in cash or an entitlement for which others would have had to pay $3.4 million." Therefore, with the settlement Resorts surrendered its claim to the repayment of the remaining $2.9 million owed by Zarin, and Zarin's assets were freed of that amount and he recognized gross income.

== Impact ==
Under federal income tax, a loan is not gross income to the borrower because the borrower has an obligation to repay the amount received and there is no accession to wealth. Along those same lines, the lender may not deduct the amount of the loan because the loan merely converts one asset (cash) into another asset (a promise of repayment). Furthermore, if the lender forgives or cancels the debt there may be income tax consequences for the borrower.

These general axioms directly affect many taxpayers because millions of individuals across the United States deal with loans and indebtedness. As a result, the principles discussed and analyzed in Zarin v. Commissioner are relevant to any taxpayer concerned with those issues. According to the decision, a cancellation of debt through settlement proceedings, no matter the amount of pre-settlement indebtedness, releases the taxpayer from the debt obligation without creating taxable income. "The excess of the original debt over the amount determined to have been due is disregarded for both loss and debt accounting purposes."

== Critique ==
The Tenth Circuit criticized the Zarin decision in Preslar v. Commissioner, suggesting that the Third Circuit had erred in treating liquidated and unliquidated debts alike.

The problem with the Third Circuit's holding is it treats liquidated and unliquidated debts alike. The whole theory behind requiring that the amount of a debt be disputed before the contested liability exception can be triggered is that only in the context of disputed debts is the Internal Revenue Service (IRS) unaware of the exact consideration initially exchanged in a transaction ... The mere fact that a taxpayer challenges the enforceability of a debt in good faith does not necessarily mean he or she is shielded from discharge-of-indebtedness income upon resolution of the dispute. To implicate the contested liability doctrine, the original amount of the debt must be unliquidated. A total denial of liability is not a dispute touching upon the amount of the underlying debt.
