= Barbara Buono =

American politician

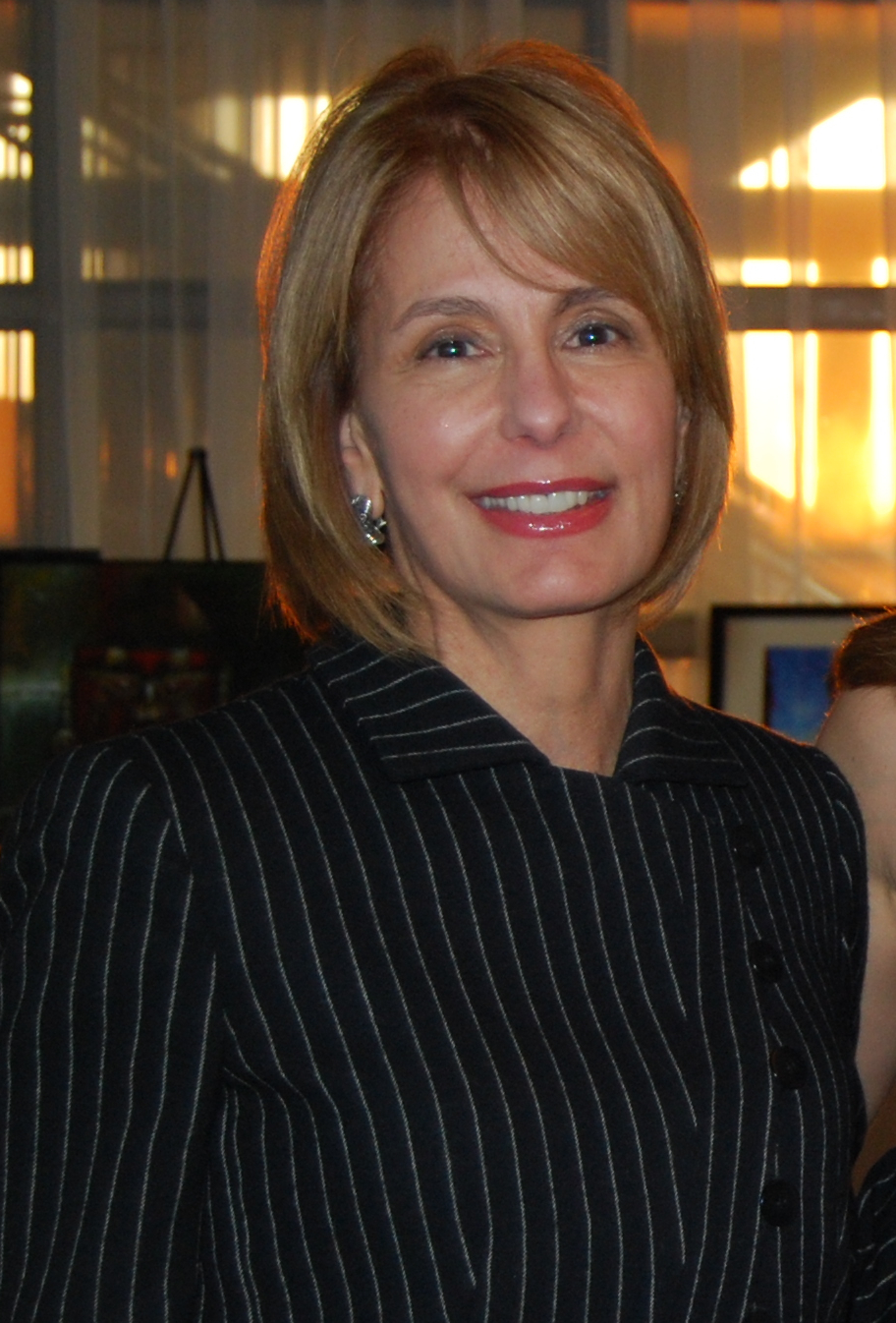

Majority Leader of the New Jersey Senate
- In office January 12, 2010 – January 10, 2012
- Preceded by: Stephen Sweeney
- Succeeded by: Loretta Weinberg

Member of the New Jersey Senate from the 18th district
- In office January 8, 2002 – January 14, 2014
- Preceded by: David Himelman
- Succeeded by: Peter Barnes

Member of the New Jersey General Assembly from the 18th district
- In office December 1, 1994 – January 8, 2002
- Preceded by: Joanna Gregory-Scocchi
- Succeeded by: Patrick Diegnan

Personal details
- Born: July 28, 1953 (age 73) Newark, New Jersey, U.S.
- Party: Democratic
- Spouse: Martin Gizzi (m. 2002)
- Children: 6
- Education: Montclair State University (BA); Rutgers University, Camden (JD)

Barbara A. Buono (born July 28, 1953) is an American politician who served in the New Jersey Senate from 2002 to 2014, where she represented the 18th Legislative District. She served from 2010 to 2012 as the Majority Leader in the Senate, succeeding Stephen Sweeney, and was succeeded by Loretta Weinberg. She is a member of the Democratic Party and was the Democratic nominee for Governor of New Jersey in the 2013 general election, which she lost to Republican incumbent Chris Christie in a landslide, with 38.2 percent of the vote.

Before entering the Senate, Buono served in the lower house of the New Jersey Legislature, the General Assembly, from 1994 to 2002, where she served as the Minority Parliamentarian from 1996 to 1998. In the Assembly, Buono became the ranking Democrat on the Assembly Budget Committee. She was Democratic Conference Chair from 2004 to 2007.

== Biography ==
Buono was born in Newark, grew up in Nutley, New Jersey and attended Nutley Public Schools, graduating from Nutley High School in 1971. Buono received a B.A. in 1975 from Montclair State College in Political Science and earned a J.D. in 1979 from the Rutgers School of Law–Camden.

Before joining the Metuchen borough council, she was a member of the Middlesex County Democratic Committee. While serving on the borough council, she served on the Metuchen Planning Board for one year in 1994.

Buono is married to Dr. Martin Gizzi and has four children with her first husband and two step-children with Dr. Gizzi. In 2015, Buono sold her home in Metuchen and moved to Portland, Oregon.

== Political career ==
She began her career as a criminal trial attorney for the New Jersey Department of the Public Advocate and later entered private practice. Buono first ran for local office on November 3, 1992, serving on the Metuchen, New Jersey Borough Council from January 1, 1993 to December 1, 1994.

Buono ran against and beat incumbent Republican State Assemblywoman Joanna Gregory-Scocchi in 1994, who had been chosen by a Republican special convention in February 1994 to fill the vacant seat of Republican Assemblywoman Harriet Derman (who was chosen by Governor Christine Whitman to head the New Jersey Department of Community Affairs). In the November 8, 1994, special election, early favorite Gregory-Scocchi was defeated by Buono, after disclosures that a temporary employment firm owned by Gregory-Scocchi had hired illegal immigrants, with Buono having received 27,229 votes (53.74%) and Gregory-Scocchi 23,436 votes (46.26%). Buono was sworn into office on December 1, 1994. After serving seven years in the New Jersey General Assembly she was elected to the New Jersey Senate on November 6, 2001. Buono served in the Senate on the Budget and Appropriations Committee (as Chair), the Intergovernmental Relations Commission and the Joint Budget Oversight Committee. She was the first woman to serve as Chair of the Senate Budget and Appropriations Committee. At the beginning of the 2010 session, Senator Buono became the first woman to be elected Majority Leader of the New Jersey State Senate. She held the position through the end of the 2011 session, when she was succeeded by Loretta Weinberg, after Buono declined to agree with Senate President Stephen Sweeney on the terms of a power-sharing deal.

Buono was the author of the New Jersey "Anti-Bullying Law", which requires school districts to implement anti-harassment and bullying prevention policies to make schools safer for vulnerable children. She was also the prime sponsor of consumer protection measures restricting telemarketing by creating the most stringent "Do Not Call" database legislation in the nation. Senator Buono is also the prime sponsor of the law prohibiting the practice of predatory lending, in which lenders issue loans with hidden costs and excessive fees to homeowners, eroding their financial security and putting their homes at risk. She currently serves as Vice-Chair of the Senate Legislative Oversight Committee, and serves on the Health, Human Services and Senior Citizens Committee, and the State Government, Wagering, Tourism, & Historic Preservation committee.

Buono voted for the legalization of medical marijuana. Word bills related to the measure were signed into law by Democratic Governor Jon Corzine and six bills related to the measure were vetoed by Republican Governor Chris Christie.

=== District 18 ===
Each of the forty districts in the New Jersey Legislature has one representative in the New Jersey Senate and two members in the New Jersey General Assembly. The other representatives from the 18th District for the 2012-2013 Legislative Session were:

- Assemblyman Peter J. Barnes III (D)
- Assemblyman Patrick J. Diegnan (D)

== 2013 campaign for Governor ==
On December 11, 2012, Buono announced her candidacy for Governor of New Jersey in the Democratic primary, with the winner to face Republican incumbent Chris Christie in the 2013 election. Buono gained considerable party support by late January. In the primary election on June 4, 2013, she was chosen over one opponent to be the Democratic nominee for Governor of New Jersey in the 2013 general election. Despite New Jersey being a historically Democratic state in presidential contests, her campaign struggled to gain traction against Christie, who was popular at the time.

On July 29, Buono selected Milly Silva, executive vice president of 1199 SEIU, as her running mate for lieutenant governor.

On November 5, Buono was defeated by incumbent Governor Chris Christie by a 60.3% to 38.2% margin.

== Post election ==
Buono moved to Portland, Oregon in 2015 and became advisor to Mayor Ted Wheeler. She returned to the East Coast in 2019.

== Electoral history ==
New Jersey gubernatorial election, 2013
| Party | Candidate | Votes | % | ±% |
|---|---|---|---|---|
| Republican | Chris Christie (incumbent) | 1,278,932 | 60.30% | +11.80% |
| Democratic | Barbara Buono | 809,978 | 38.19% | −6.71% |
| Libertarian | Kenneth R. Kaplan | 12,155 | 0.57% | +0.37% |
| Green | Steve Welzer | 8,295 | 0.39% | +0.39% |
| Glass-Steagall Now | Diane W. Sare | 3,360 | 0.16% | +0.16% |
| Peace and Freedom | William Araujo | 3,300 | 0.16% | +0.16% |
| Independent | Hank Schroeder | 2,784 | 0.13% | +0.13% |
| NSA Did 911 | Jeff Boss | 2,062 | 0.1% | +0.1% |
| Majority | | 468,954 | 22.11% | +18.53% |
| Turnout | | 2,120,866 | 38.48% | −8.4% |
| Republican hold | | Swing | | |

New Jersey State Senate elections, 2011
| Party | Candidate | Votes | % |
|---|---|---|---|
| Democratic | Barbara Buono (incumbent) | 19,631 | 60.1 |
| Republican | Gloria S. Dittman | 13,042 | 39.9 |
| Democratic hold | | | |

New Jersey State Senate elections, 2007
| Party | Candidate | Votes | % |
|---|---|---|---|
| Democratic | Barbara Buono (incumbent) | 21,365 | 62.4 |
| Republican | Daniel H. Brown | 12,896 | 37.6 |
| Democratic hold | | | |

New Jersey State Senate elections, 2003
| Party | Candidate | Votes | % |
|---|---|---|---|
| Democratic | Barbara Buono (incumbent) | 18,561 | 58.49 |
| Republican | Richard F. Plechner | 13,175 | 41.51 |
| Democratic hold | | | |

New Jersey State Senate elections, 2001
| Party | Candidate | Votes | % |
|---|---|---|---|
| Democratic | Barbara Buono | 33,487 | 64.96 |
| Republican | John Cito | 18,064 | 35.04 |
| Democratic gain from Republican | | | |

New Jersey General Assembly elections, 1999
| Party | Candidate | Votes | % |
|---|---|---|---|
| Democratic | Barbara Buono (incumbent) | 19,327 | 31.8 |
| Democratic | Peter J. Barnes, Jr. (incumbent) | 18,068 | 29.7 |
| Republican | E. Martin Davidoff | 11,853 | 19.5 |
| Republican | Norman Van Houten | 11,632 | 19.1 |
| Democratic hold | | | |

New Jersey General Assembly elections, 1997
| Party | Candidate | Votes | % |
|---|---|---|---|
| Democratic | Barbara Buono (incumbent) | 33,248 | 28.6 |
| Democratic | Peter J. Barnes, Jr. (incumbent) | 31,781 | 27.3 |
| Republican | Wendy L. Weibalk | 25,729 | 22.1 |
| Republican | Thomas J. Toto | 25,612 | 22.0 |
| Democratic hold | | | |

New Jersey General Assembly elections, 1995
| Party | Candidate | Votes | % |
|---|---|---|---|
| Democratic | Barbara Buono (incumbent) | 20,530 | 26.6 |
| Democratic | Peter J. Barnes, Jr. | 19,531 | 25.3 |
| Republican | Jeffrey A. Warsh (incumbent) | 17,941 | 23.3 |
| Republican | L. Jane Tousman | 16,790 | 21.8 |

New Jersey General Assembly Special election, 1994
| Party | Candidate | Votes | % |
|---|---|---|---|
| Democratic | Barbara Buono | 27,229 | 53.7 |
| Republican | Joanna Gregory-Scocchi (incumbent) | 23,436 | 46.3 |
| Democratic gain from Republican | | | |

New Jersey General Assembly
| Preceded by Joanna Gregory-Scocchi | Member of the New Jersey Assembly from the 18th district 1994–2002; Served alongside: Jeffrey Warsh, Peter Barnes | Succeeded by Patrick Diegnan |
New Jersey Senate
| Preceded by David Himelman | Member of the New Jersey Senate from the 18th district 2002–2014 | Succeeded by Peter Barnes |
| Preceded by Steve Sweeney | Majority Leader of the New Jersey Senate; 2010–2012 | Succeeded by Loretta Weinberg |
Party political offices
| Preceded by Jon Corzine | Democratic nominee for Governor of New Jersey; 2013 | Succeeded by Phil Murphy |
