= Nancy Pinkin =

American politician

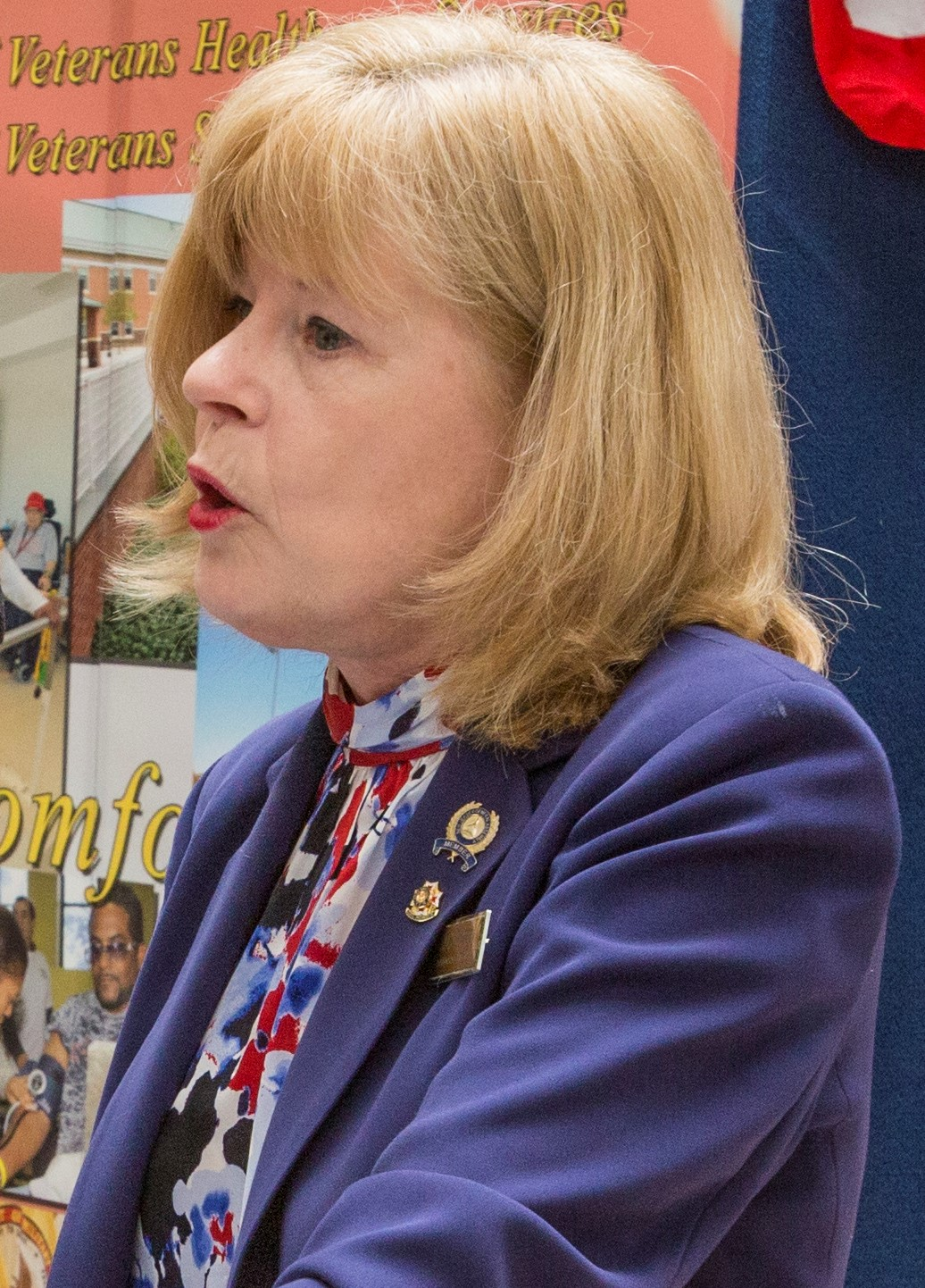

Member of the New Jersey General Assembly from the 18th District
- In office January 14, 2014 – December 31, 2020 Serving with Robert Karabinchak
- Preceded by: Peter J. Barnes III
- Succeeded by: Sterley Stanley

Chair of the New Jersey General Assembly Committee on Environment and Solid Waste
- In office January 9, 2018 – December 31, 2020
- Preceded by: Tim Eustace

Personal details
- Born: August 4, 1952 (age 73) Jersey City, New Jersey, U.S.
- Party: Democratic
- Spouse: James Salwitz
- Children: 2
- Website: Legislative Website

Nancy J. Pinkin is an American Democratic Party politician, who has been the County Clerk of Middlesex County, New Jersey since 2021, before which she served in the New Jersey General Assembly from 2014 to 2020 where she represented the 18th Legislative District.

== Early life ==
Pinkin served on the East Brunswick Township Council 2005 to 2014, including a two-year term as Council President. She also served three years on the East Brunswick Planning Board. Pinkin runs her own healthcare and association management consulting firm, Pinkin Associates, Inc., and has an extensive background in healthcare administration, with an expertise in ambulatory care and medical practice management. She is also the Executive Director of the Middlesex and Mercer County Medical Societies. She received an associates degree from Middlesex County College in Applied Science, a Bachelor of Science degree from Rutgers University, and holds a Master of Public Administration with a specialization in health administration from New York University. She completed a postgraduate fellowship in Health Policy and Research at UMDNJ where she also served as health policy advisor to then-State Senator Jack Sinagra. Pinkin resigned her seat on December 31, 2020, to become the Middlesex County clerk.

== New Jersey Assembly ==
Pinkin was elected to the Assembly in 2013, and then again in 2015 alongside Patrick J. Diegnan. She was re-elected to the Assembly in 2017 alongside Robert Karabinchak. She has served as Deputy Speaker Pro-Tempore since 2018.

=== Committees ===
- Environment and Solid Waste, Chair
- Health and Senior Services
- Law and Public Safety
- New Jersey Legislative Select Oversight

== District 18 ==
Each of the forty districts in the New Jersey Legislature has one representative in the New Jersey Senate and two members in the New Jersey General Assembly. The other representatives from the 18th District for the 2014-2015 Legislative Session are:

- Senator Patrick J. Diegnan (D)
- Assemblyman Robert Karabinchak (D)

== Electoral history ==
=== New Jersey Assembly ===
New Jersey General Assembly elections, 2019
Party	Candidate	Votes	%
Democratic	Nancy Pinkin (incumbent)	19,431	30.6
Democratic	Robert Karabinchak (incumbent)	18,727	29.49
Republican	Robert Bengivenga	13,002	20.47
Republican	Jeffrey Brown	12,349	19.4

New Jersey General Assembly elections, 2017
Party	Candidate	Votes	%
Democratic	Nancy Pinkin (incumbent)	25,526	32.0
Democratic	Robert Karabinchak (incumbent)	24,786	31.0
Republican	April Bengivenga	15,344	19.0
Republican	Jimmy Hu	14,255	18.0

New Jersey General Assembly elections, 2015
Party	Candidate	Votes	%
Democratic	Patrick J. Diegnan (incumbent)	16,174	32.0
Democratic	Nancy J. Pinkin (incumbent)	16,008	32.0
Republican	Teresa Rose Hutchison	9,378	19.0
Republican	Synnove Bakke	9,071	18.0

New Jersey General Assembly elections, 2013
Party	Candidate	Votes	%
Democratic	Patrick J. Diegnan (incumbent)	24,996	27.4
Democratic	Nancy J. Pinkin	24,186	26.5
Republican	Rob Bengivenga	21,517	23.6
Republican	Lisa Goldhamer	20,559	22.5
Independent	Sheila Angalet	1,068	1.2

New Jersey General Assembly
Preceded by Peter J. Barnes III	Member of the New Jersey General Assembly for the 18th District; January 14, 2014 – December 31, 2020; With: Patrick J. Diegnan, Robert Karabinchak	Succeeded by Sterley Stanley
