= New Jersey State Parole Board =

Governmental body in the U.S. State of New Jersey

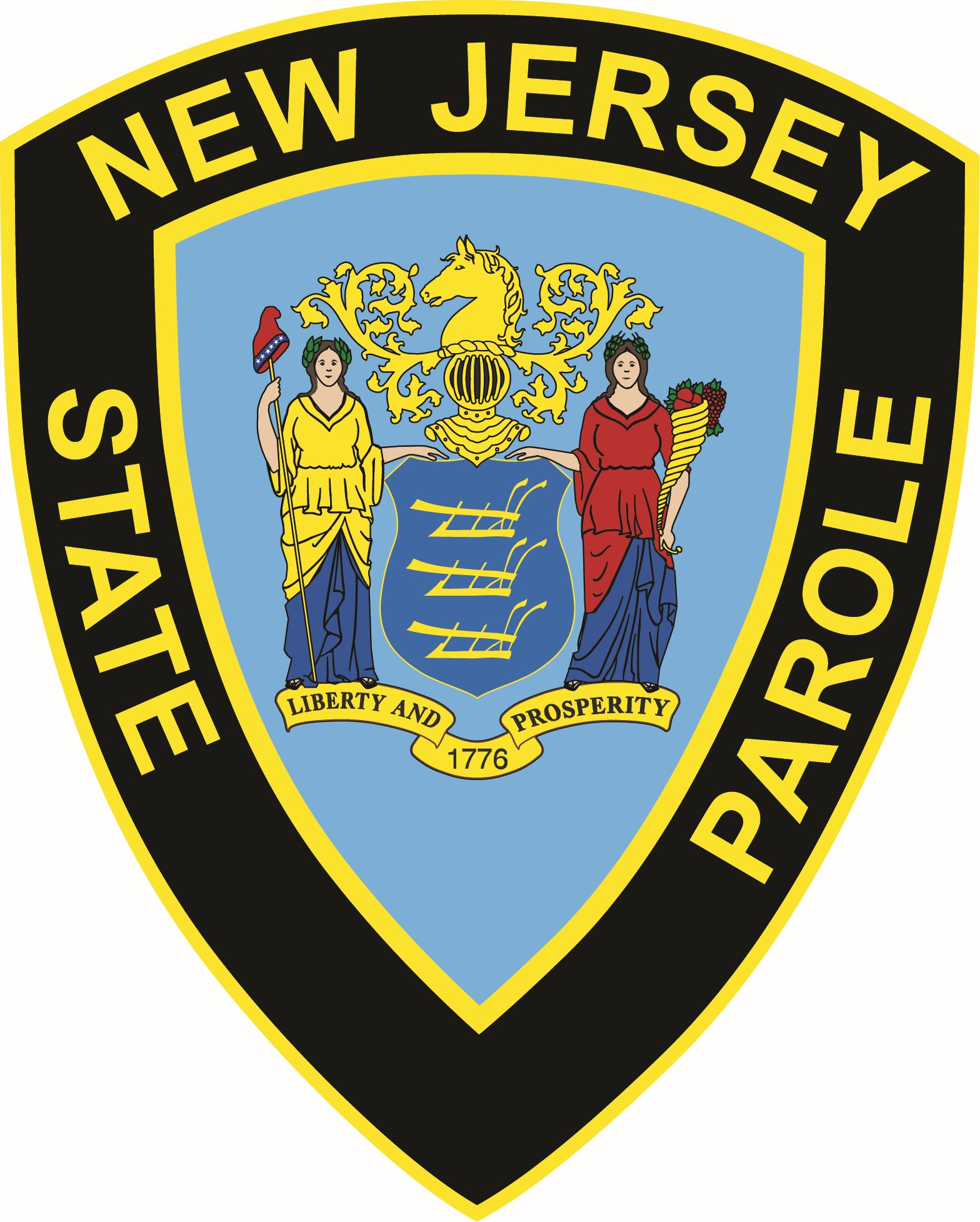

Agency overview
- Formed: 1918
- Jurisdiction: New Jersey
- Headquarters: 171 Jersey Street Trenton, NJ 08611
- Employees: 600+ sworn law enforcement & civilian employees
- Agency executives: Samuel J. Plumeri, Jr., Chairman; Ronald L. Slaughter, Vice-chairman; Dina I. Rogers, Esq, Executive Director; David Brooks, Chief, Division of Parole
- Website: http://www.state.nj.us/parole/

The New Jersey State Parole Board is a governmental body in the U.S. State of New Jersey that is responsible for assisting offenders to reenter society as law-abiding residents. To improve the safety of the public and the quality of life in New Jersey by administering an innovative parole system that addresses the needs of the community, victims, and offenders through a responsible decision-making process that provides every available opportunity for successful offender reintegration.

The New Jersey State Parole Board is committed to promoting public safety and fostering rehabilitation of offenders by implementing policies that result in effective parole case management.

== Division of Parole ==
In New Jersey, parole officers are sworn law enforcement officers who work within the State Parole Board's Division of Parole. New Jersey parole officers, who have been or who may hereafter be appointed or employed, shall, by virtue of such appointment or employment and in addition to any other power or authority, be empowered to act as officers for the detection, apprehension, arrest and conviction of offenders against the law. The Division is responsible for the supervision of more than 15,000 offenders statewide. These include offenders approved for parole release by the appointed Parole Board Members, as well as offenders released to Mandatory Supervision (MSV) under the No Early Release Act, and sex offenders sentenced to Community Supervision for Life (CSL) or Parole Supervision for Life (PSL).

The Division of Parole is managed by a command staff consisting of a Chief, a Deputy Chief, Captains, Lieutenants and Sergeants . The community supervision of offenders is the responsibility of Senior Parole Officers (SrPO) and Parole Officer Recruits (POR).

The New Jersey State Parole Board includes the following members, as of 2024 Ronald L. Slaughter (vice-chairman), Kerri Cody, Frank DelVecchio, Allen DelVento, Robert M. Goodale, Thomas Haaf, James B. Jefferson, Charlie Jones, Richard Molinari, Trudy M. Steinhardt, Clarence K. Taylor, Kenneth L. Saunders (Alternate Board Member), Steven T. Yglesias (Alternate Board Member), Dina I. Rogers, Esq (Executive director).

== Division commands and special operations units ==
Each parole officer in the Division of Parole serves in one of 10 regional district offices, or in one of several special operations units. These units include:

=== District offices ===
- #1 - Passaic
- #3 - Neptune Township
- #4 - Jersey City
- #5 - Elizabeth
- #6 - Trenton
- #7 - Camden
- #8 - Pleasantville
- #9 - Newark
- #10 - Bridgeton
- #11 - New Brunswick

=== Special Operations Units or Assignments ===
- Community Programs Supervision Unit (CPSU)
- Electronic Monitoring Program - includes Electronic Monitoring Response Team (EMP/EMRT)
- FBI - Joint Terrorism Task Force (JTTF)
- Homeland Security Task Force (HSTF)
- Honor Guard Unit (HGU)
- Internet Crimes Against Children Task Force (ICAC)
- Law Enforcement Training and Recruitment Unit (LETRU)
- Office of Administrative Services (OAS) - includes Investigations Management Office (IMO) and Policy & Accreditation
- Office of Interstate Services (OIS)
- Office of Professional Standards (OPS)
- Parole Communications and Command Center (PCC)
- Polygraph Unit
- Special Operations Group (SOG) - includes Parole Apprehension Team (PAT) and Interstate Extraditions
- Sex Offender Management

==== Community Programs Supervision Unit (CPSU) ====
The Community Programs Supervision Unit includes those parole officers assigned to work with the State Parole Board's Division of Community Programs. These parole officers supervise parolees undergoing active treatment for addiction, mental health or other rehabilitative services in a residential treatment facility, or other community-based program. The parole officers serve as a liaison between the parolee, the State Parole Board and the community program facility personnel.

==== Electronic Monitoring Program (EMP/EMRT) ====
The Electronic Monitoring Unit operates a Global Positioning System (GPS) home confinement program for technical parole violators and other offenders deemed to need a higher level of supervision and monitoring. With the use of electronic ankle-mounted transmitters and home-based receivers that provide automatic alerts, the parole officers in the Electronic Monitoring Unit help ensure these offenders remain under home confinement at all times, except in cases where their conditions of supervision allow them outside at specific times for work, education or related activities. The Electronic Monitoring Response Team responds to off-hours emergencies, and follow-up with parolees on the monitoring program to ensure compliance with program rules and to address equipment issues.

==== Homeland Security Task Force (HSTF) ====
Parole officers assigned to the Homeland Security Task Force serve in this unit part time, in addition to their normal supervision duties. The Homeland Security Task Force is made up of more than 50 parole officers and supervisors trained to assist federal, state and local emergency responders in the event of a terror alert or other large-scale civil disturbance. These parole officers and supervisors work with the FBI, New Jersey Office of Homeland Security, and New Jersey Office of Emergency Management in intelligence sharing, investigation and preparing for potential public safety threats.

==== Honor Guard Unit (HGU) ====
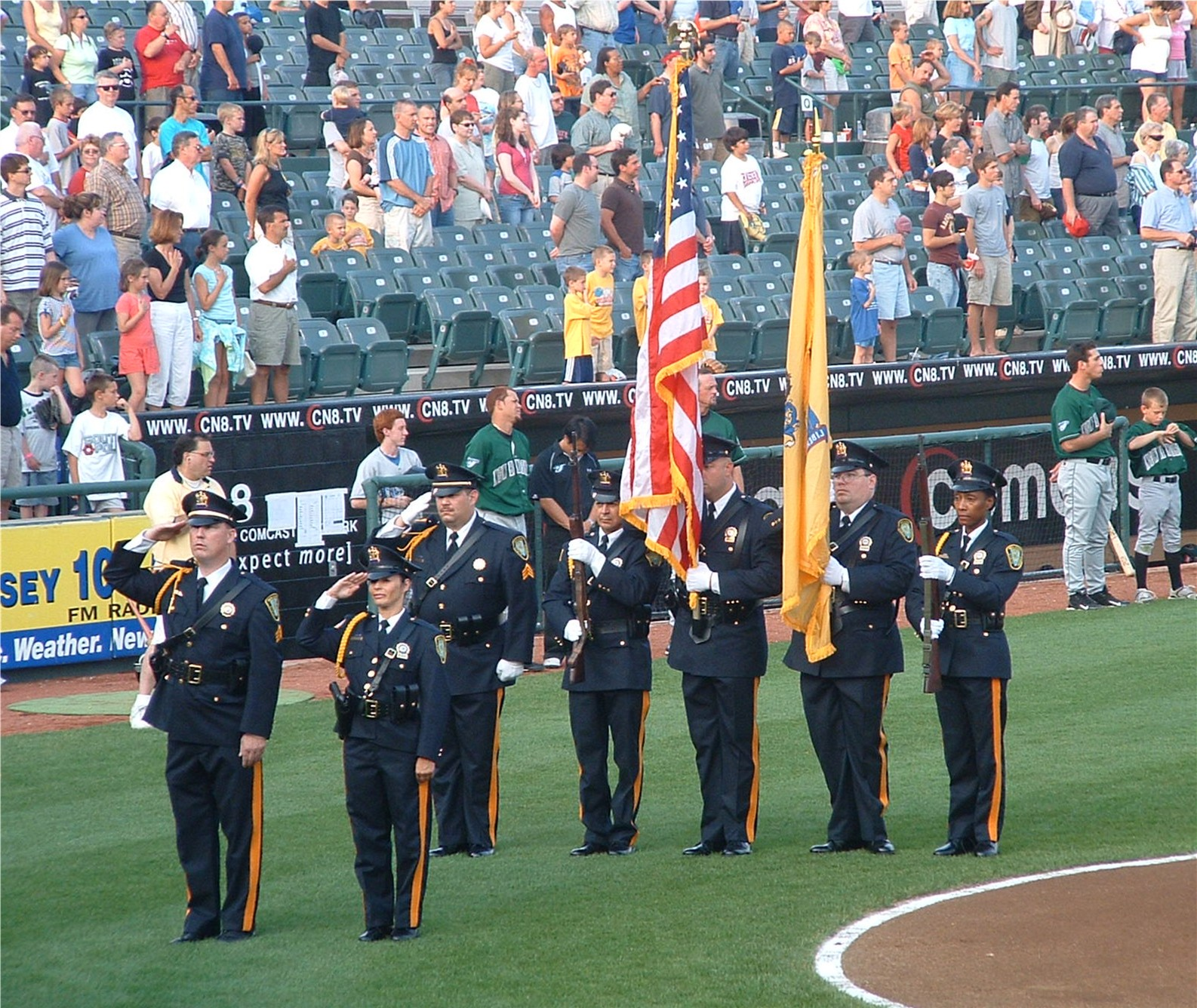
Presenting the Colors at a Trenton Thunder Home Game

The Honor Guard Unit (HGU) is a ceremonial unit comprised from all ranks within the Division of Parole. The HGU was formed in the summer of 2005 the original 10 members consisted of (2) Sergeants and (8) Senior Parole Officers. The HGU services to present the National and State colors at a variety of functions including events attended by dignitaries, Award Ceremonies, Police Academy Graduations, parades, and professional and amateur sporting events. Additionally, the HGU will represent the agency at the funerals of fallen Law Enforcement Officers, both internally and externally, and civilian members of the State Parole Board. The HGU has a special designated class "A" uniform which appointed members of the HGU are provided upon orders of the Director, Division of Parole. The HGU is a prestigious unit and selection of the members is done after careful review of that officers employment history. Failure to maintain a positive standing in the agency can result in a suspension or dismissal from the HGU.

==== Internet Crimes Against Children (ICAC) ====
NJSPB Division of Parole partners with and participates in ICAC Task Force, which is national network of 61 coordinated task forces, representing over 5,400 federal, state, and local law enforcement, dedicated to investigating, prosecuting and developing effective responses to internet crimes against children. In response to a grow trend of criminals against children and teens through the proliferation of internet access and devices, the ICAC Task Force agencies, engage in both proactive and reactive investigations, forensic examinations, and criminal prosecutions.

==== Law Enforcement Training and Recruitment Unit (LETRU) ====
The Law Enforcement Training and Recruitment Unit (LETRU), provides ongoing in-service training to parole officers, including updates in use of force, Active Shooter Training, First Aid/CPR, firearms handling, supervision techniques and information technology applications. The LETG also works in partnership with the Division of Criminal Justice Academy and the Police Training Commission (PTC) to provide intensive training to candidates selected by the State Parole Board to become Parole Officer Recruits. The State Parole Board's Parole Officer Recruit training is among the most challenging and comprehensive parole officer training programs in the nation. Recruits receive more than six months of academy and agency training followed by a six-month probationary period which includes assignment to a Field Training Officer and on-the-job mentoring before they are eligible for promotion to the position of Senior Parole Officer.

Recruitment activities are also an important part of the Law Enforcement Training & Recruitment Unit. The unit participates in recruitment events at colleges and job fairs in an effort to obtain a diverse pool of individuals who may one day be New Jersey State Parole Officers.

The Law Enforcement Training & Recruitment Unit is also the quartermaster for the agency and is responsible for the ordering, issuance, maintenance, and inventorying of equipment for all sworn State Parole Board Officers.

==== Office of Administrative Services (OAS) ====
The Investigations Management Office (IMO) is responsible for all new criminal charges filed by the State Parole Board's law enforcement staff. This includes conducting primary and supplemental criminal investigations, maintaining and forwarding as discovery all official investigation reports, handles all evidence control functions for any and all criminal related evidence including, but is not limited to, crime scene investigation and transporting evidence to the State Police lab, and conducting forensic searches of computers and other electronic data storage/transmittal devices. Additionally, the Investigations Management Office staff act as the coordinator of all State Parole Board fingerprint live scan machines and requirements under NJS Title 53, monitor and conduct audits for the agency's use of Criminal Justice Information System (CJIS)(TAC), and conducts in-service and recruit training for all criminal investigations functions.

The Policy and Accreditation section is responsible for the continual review and creation of Agency policies with regard to the requirements New Jersey State Association of Chiefs of Police (NJSACOP). The NJSACOP set the standards for agency seeking accreditation or seeking to maintain their accreditation. Policy and Accreditation is very labor intense and continuously seeks areas that need to be improved or modified within the agency as conditions and NJSACOP standards change. Policy and Accreditation maintains Policy Tech, which is an electronic employee manual and forms repository.

==== Office of Interstate Services (OIS) ====
The Interstate Compact for Adult Offender Supervision (ICAOS) allows all 50 states to ensure a coordinated and managed system for the transfer of parolees and supervision duties across state lines. The State Parole Board's Office of Interstate Services (OIS) monitors the supervision in other states of parolees who were sentenced in New Jersey, and the supervision in New Jersey of parolees who were sentenced in other states. The Office also manages the extradition of absconders from State Parole Board and juvenile parole supervision, as well as escapees from the New Jersey Department of Corrections and the New Jersey Administrative Office of the Courts Intensive Supervision Program (ISP).

==== Office of Professional Standards (OPS) ====
The Office of Professional Standards is staffed with investigators who are tasked with conducting internal affairs investigations within the New Jersey State Parole Board. Additionally, OPS conducts special investigations at the direction of the agency executive staff or when complaints are received from the public. OPS also participates in investigations and special operations at the contracted residential and community treatment programs utilized by the NJSPB Division of Parole.

==== Parole Communications and Command Center (C2) ====
State of art communication center which will be operational in June 2022. Housed within the communications facility will also be the new Command Center, which is staff 24/7/365 for the command and control of NJSPB Division of Parole.

==== Polygraph Unit ====
Specially trained group of NJSPB parole officers, who work in conjunction with the Sex Offender Management Unit, and other Parole units, who supervise convicted sex offenders. These parole officers conduct in-depth polygraph examinations, which are used to address sex offenders needs, truthfulness about their reentry into society and to provide clinical treatment providers with information for the development of treatment and counseling of these offender population.

==== Special Operations Group (SOG) ====
The Parole Apprehension Team (PAT) conducts investigations to locate parole absconders, and conducts operations to capture and return them to correctional facilities. SOG is also tasked with conducting Interstate Extraditions for the return of offenders who have fled the State of New Jersey to hide from Parole Supervision or return to avoid incarceration for parole violations and new criminal offenses. Additional, SOG members are deployed as a quick reaction team 24/7/365 to respond to emergent situations, high risk details, prisoner transports or as requested by other Division units or the direction of Division Command Staff.

==== Sex Offender Management ====
The State Parole Board's caseload of sex offenders is one of the largest in America, mainly due to the advent of Community Supervision for Life (CSL) and Parole Supervision for Life (PSL) sentencing for sex offenders. Prior to the introduction of this sentencing mandate, sex offenders made up less than 5 percent of the State Parole Board's caseload. Today, they make up nearly a third of the caseload, with a net increase of about 45 new sex offenders each month.

Parole officers use a "containment" approach to sex offender supervision. This approach includes intensive parole supervision and information sharing with partner law enforcement agencies; sex offender-specific treatment to help control sex offenders' impulsivity; and will soon include polygraph examinations in certain cases, to obtain sexual history information and monitor offenders for behaviors that increase the risk of re-offense.

== Recruit selection and training ==
At the end of 2011 the State Parole Board Executive Staff made the decision to initiate a new comprehensive hiring process for all new parole officer recruits. A major factor in this new process was to have all future recruit classes attend the DCJ Training Academy's Basic Course for Investigators in Sea Girt. The first recruit class attended in 2012 and continues today.

A candidate for sworn parole officer must possess a four year college degree from an accredited university or college. Those seeking selection to become a sworn parole officer must pass a series of entrance requirements which begins with the taking of a Civil Service Selection Examination given by the State of New Jersey's Civil Service Commission (CSC). Once the test is given and graded, passing applicants will be certified by CSC and the applicant will be provided the application package. An intensive background investigation is conducted by the Office of Professional Standards, which includes, but not limited, previous employment checks, family and neighborhood checks, criminal background and driver history checks, financial background check, school checks and drug screening. If the candidate passes the background check, they are then given a physical performance aptitude test to make sure that they are capable of passing the minimum physical training requirements of the DCJ Academy. They will then be referred for oral review board conducted by the Division of Parole Command Staff. Lastly, the candidate will be referred for medical and psychological examinations. If the candidate is successful in all areas of selection, the candidate will be offered employment and given orientation for the agency and the police academy.

The six-month Basic Course for Investigators covers general topics such as investigative procedures essential to the successful investigation, apprehension and prosecution of criminals. Basic firearms training and physical conditioning training are also conducted during this rigorous training academy course. The DCJ Academy is a Police Training Commission certified academy that conducts a wide range of in-service and pre-service training programs for the state's law enforcement and criminal justice communities, including state and county investigators, deputy attorneys general, assistant prosecutors, municipal and county police, police executives, arson investigators, parole, and corrections personnel.

At the successful conclusion of the academy, a candidate is commissioned as a sworn law enforcement officer with the title of Parole Officer Recruit (POR). PORs are assigned to the various district offices where they receive on the job training from a veteran Senior Parole Officer (SrPO), who has been trained as a Field Training Officer (FTO). The FTO program is designed for the POR to be exposed all functions of parole officers and to gain experience by learning in a hands on environment. The FTOs prepare reports that are forwarded to their Lieutenants (Lt) and the LETRU. PORs will serve a one-year probationary period. If successfully completed, the POR will be promoted to a Senior Parole Officer and be eligible for all assignments with the Division.

== New Jersey State Association of Chiefs of Police Accreditation ==
The State Parole Board achieved the New Jersey Association of Chiefs of Police Law Enforcement Accreditation on May 9, 2013. Accreditation status represents a significant professional achievement as it acknowledges the implementation of policies and procedures that are conceptually sound, operationally effective and consistent with nationally recognized best practices. Accreditation is a progressive and time-proven way of improving overall performance. The rigorous standards set forth by the Chiefs of Police have resulted in significant enhancements to the operational efficiency and efficacy of the agency. Some specific areas of improvement have been realized in the areas of recruitment, evidence collection and storage, performance management, officer safety, and training. The State Parole Board continues to strive to maintain compliance with accreditation standards on a daily basis. The State Parole Board earned reaccreditations in 2016, 2021, 2023 and 2026. The next reaccreditation is scheduled for 2029.

== Equipment and Vehicles ==
=== Firearms & Duty Equipment ===
- Glock 19 w/ weapons mount flashlights and optics
- Glock 26
- Mossberg 500
- Monadnock AutoLock Expandable Baton
- First Defense O/C Spray MK-6
- Peerless 801 Hinged Handcuffs
- Axon 3 Body Cameras

=== Vehicles ===
- Chevrolet Malibus
- Chevrolet Express Passenger Vans
- Ford Interceptor SUV
- Ford Transit Van
- Dodge Chargers AWD
