= New Brunswick Health Sciences Technology High School =

Location
- 165 Bayard Street; New Brunswick, NJ 08901; United States; 40.4935°N 74.4513°W

Information
- Type: Public high school
- Established: 1999
- School district: New Brunswick Public Schools
- Principal: Jeremiah Clifford
- Faculty: 18
- Grades: 9-12
- Enrollment: 225 (as of 2014-15)
- Student to teacher ratio: 11.8:1
- Website: hst.nbpschools.net

Health Sciences Technology High School (NBHSTHS) is a magnet public high school focused on health sciences. The school is the result of a partnership between the New Brunswick Board of Education and Robert Wood Johnson University Hospital (RWJUH). The school is part of the New Brunswick Public Schools district and is run by Innovative Educational Programs (IEP).

As of the 2014-15 school year, there were 225 students attending the school and 19 teachers, for a student–teacher ratio of 11.8:1.

== Awards ==
In 2003, NBHSTHS was the only recipient of the Governor's Award for Community Service and Volunteerism, a prestigious award that recognizes schools with amazing community service programs.

== History ==
The school was created around the Health Professions Scholars Program, which had since 1992 given students at New Brunswick High School the opportunity to learn about health careers, shadow RWJUH workers for a month and work at the hospital over the summer. Impressed by the program's success, the district decided to create an entire school focused upon it. The building itself, a modular three-story building, was constructed and equipped by I.E.P. on land provided by RWJUH. Its doors opened in 1999.

== Academic program ==
The school has a rigorous academic program. Students that fail to maintain a 3.0 GPA are transferred to the New Brunswick High School. All students are expected to take four years of mathematics and science and three years of a world language, which exceeds the minimum requirements as stated by New Jersey and the New Brunswick Board of Education.

Students may only take the minimum requirement of art and music courses throughout their time at the school, one year total of each.

=== Health Professions Scholars ===
Throughout their time at the school, students participate in the Health Professions Scholars Program (HPSP), which gives students the opportunity to explore healthcare professions. This program begins in grades 9 and 10 with monthly lectures about various health careers. Juniors shadow professionals and explore careers at the hospital and experience other healthcare facilities of interest, and take an EMS First Aid course. Seniors intern with allied healthcare professionals in an experience that culminates with an oral presentation.

== Student body ==
The class of 2015-16 had a 100% graduation rate. 77.2% of students went to a four-year college, 11.4% went to a two-year college, and 11.4% went elsewhere.

All students at NBHSTHS can currently get free lunch.

== Extracurricular activities ==
The school offers several academic extracurricular activities. Among them are the Johnson&Johnson Bridge to Employment program, the Rutgers Future Scholars Program, the Cancer Institute of New Jersey's CREHST and CURE programs, a National Honor Society chapter, and several other Rutgers-based programs; the school also has several afterschool clubs and its annual talent show, "Techies got Talent".

In addition to these, students may attend afterschool activities and play sports at the New Brunswick High School.

== Administration ==
The principal is Dr. Jenna Anderson.
