= NBPS =

NBPS can refer to:

- New Brunswick Public Schools
- North Broward Preparatory School
