= Maysoon Zayid =

American actress and comedian (born 1976)

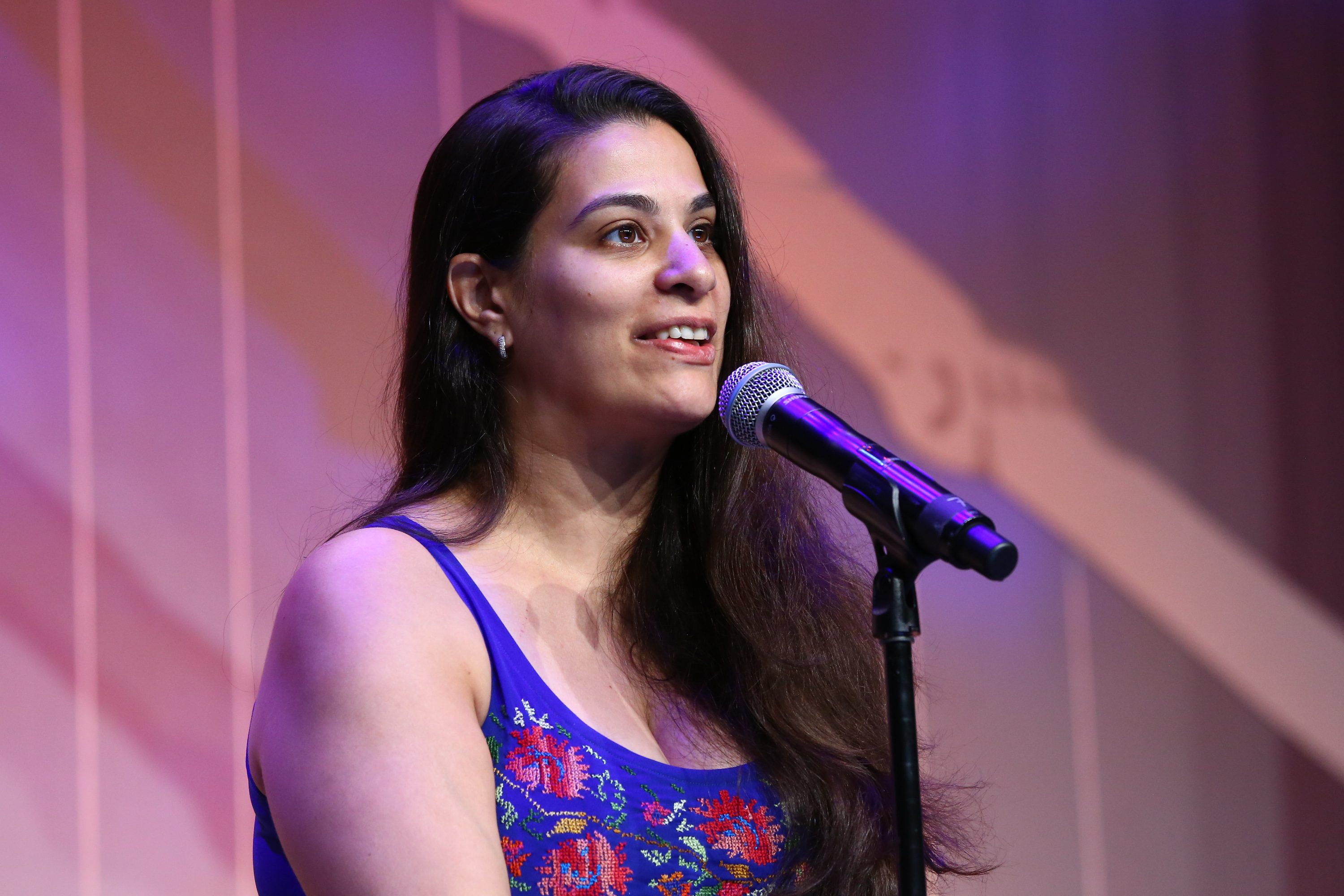
- Maysoon Zayid in 2015
- Born: 1976 (age 49–50); New Jersey, United States
- Education: Arizona State University

Comedy career
- Years active: 2000s–present
- Medium: Stand-up, Television, Film
- Genres: Observational comedy, Self-deprecation
- Subjects: Arab culture, Marriage
- Website: maysoon.com

Maysoon Zayid (Arabic: ميسون زايد; born 1976) is an American actress and comedian of Palestinian descent.

== Early life ==
Zayid was born in New Jersey in 1976. She described herself in a BBC interview as "a Palestinian Muslim virgin with cerebral palsy, from New Jersey, who is an actress, comedian and activist". Zayid has been a resident of Cliffside Park, New Jersey. Zayid earned her BFA in acting from Arizona State University.

== Career ==
Zayid started her acting career by appearing on the popular soap opera As the World Turns for two years, as well as making guest appearances on Law & Order, NBC Nightly News and ABC's 20/20.

During her early acting experiences, she found her disability and ethnicity repeatedly limiting to her advancement. Zayid then turned to stand-up and began appearing at New York's top clubs, including Caroline's, Gotham, and Stand Up NY, where she takes on serious topics such as the Israel-Palestine conflict.

She co-founded the New York Arab-American Comedy Festival in 2003 with comedian Dean Obeidallah. It is held annually in New York City and showcases Arab-American comics, actors, playwrights and filmmakers.

In late 2006, Zayid debuted her one-woman show Little American Whore (LAW) at Los Angeles's Comedy Central stage; it was produced and directed by Kathy Najimy. In 2008, LAW's screenplay was chosen for the Sundance Screenwriters Lab. Production began with Zayid as the lead in the fall of 2009.

Zayid had a role in the 2008 Adam Sandler film You Don't Mess with the Zohan.

She usually tours by herself or as a special guest on the Axis of Evil Comedy Tour. She also co-hosts the radio show Fann Majnoon (Arabic: فن مجنون) (Crazy Art) with Obeidallah.

Zayid can be seen in the 2013 documentary The Muslims Are Coming!, which features a group of Muslim American stand-up comedians touring the United States in an effort to counter Islamophobia, as well as various celebrities including Jon Stewart, David Cross, Janeane Garofalo and Rachel Maddow. In December that same year she appeared on the Melissa Harris-Perry show on December 30, 2013, as part of a panel of comedian commentators. She has also presented at the TED annual conference, and her TED Talk has been viewed approximately 1 billion times.

In June 2016 it was announced that Zayid would be developing a series about her life with Lindsey Beer.

Zayid has said repeatedly that she wants to appear on the ABC daytime soap opera General Hospital, and in June 2019 she debuted in the recurring role of Zahra Amir in the series.

=== Arts programs ===
Zayid spends three months a year in the Palestinian territories, running an arts program for disabled and orphaned children in refugee camps. She helps the children use art to deal with trauma and bridge the gap between disabled and non-disabled children. Eighty percent of the funding for the camps comes from her comedy work.

=== Book ===
In 2024, Zayid wrote the children's graphic novel Shiny Misfits, which was illustrated by Shadia Amin and published by Graphix.
