= North Brunswick Township High School =

High school in Middlesex County, New Jersey, US

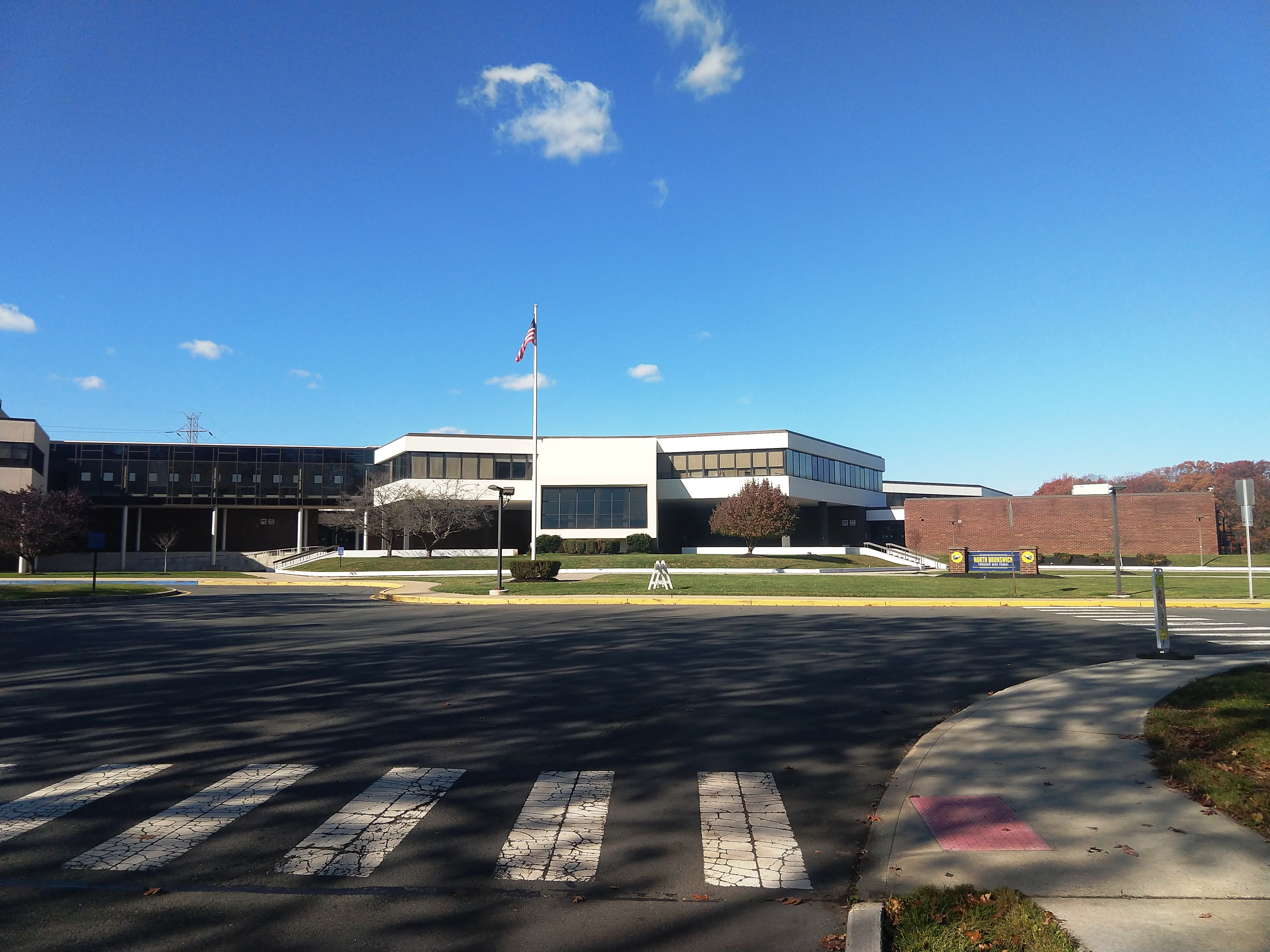

Location
- 98 Raider Road; North Brunswick, Middlesex County, New Jersey 08902; United States; 40.451752°N 74.467813°W

Information
- Type: Public
- Motto: "We are North Brunswick"
- Established: 1973
- School district: North Brunswick Township Public Schools
- NCES School ID: 341149003480
- Principal: Michael Kneller
- Faculty: 156.0 FTEs
- Grades: 9-12
- Enrollment: 1,876 (as of 2024–25)
- Student to teacher ratio: 12.0:1
- Colors: Blue; Gold
- Athletics conference: Greater Middlesex Conference (general); Big Central Football Conference (football)
- Team name: Raiders
- Rivals: East Brunswick High School; New Brunswick High School; South Brunswick High School
- Accreditation: Middle States Association of Colleges and Schools
- Newspaper: The Banner
- Website: nbths.nbtschools.org

North Brunswick Township High School (NBTHS) is a four-year comprehensive public high school located in North Brunswick, in Middlesex County, in the U.S. state of New Jersey, serving students in ninth through twelfth grades as the lone secondary school of the North Brunswick Township Public Schools. The school is accredited until July 2025 by the Middle States Association of Colleges and Schools Commission on Elementary and Secondary Schools.

As of the 2024–25 school year, the school had an enrollment of 1,876 students and 156.0 classroom teachers (on an FTE basis), for a student–teacher ratio of 12.0:1. There were 863 students (46.0% of enrollment) eligible for free lunch and 152 (8.1% of students) eligible for reduced-cost lunch.

== History ==
North Brunswick had sent students to New Brunswick High School until it completed a high school of its own in 1973 that was constructed at a cost of $10 million (equivalent to $72.5 million in 2025). The new high school opened to the district's students in grades seven through nine. The New Brunswick Public Schools sought to prevent the shift of 280 students who would have attended high school in New Brunswick from attending the new facility, arguing that the withdrawal of the almost entirely white students from North Brunswick and Milltown would leave the New Brunswick school with an overwhelmingly black student body.

== Student body ==
The school is both economically and ethnically diverse. As of 2014-15, the student body was 30% Hispanic, 24% White, 24% Asian, and 21% Black. Economically, the school enrolls students who come from high-income to low-income backgrounds.

Nearly 90% of the 1,800 students at NBTHS go on to institutions of higher education, with many choosing to attend Rutgers University, the nearby state university. The school has sent students to the summer programs at the Governor's School of New Jersey summer program and the Johns Hopkins University Center For Talented Youth. The school offers over fifteen Advanced Placement (AP) courses and had over 20 AP scholars for the 2005-06 school year.

== Awards, recognition, and rankings ==
For the 1999-2000 school year, North Brunswick Township High School was awarded the National Blue Ribbon Schools Program Award of Excellence by the United States Department of Education, the highest award an American school can receive.

U.S. News & World Report in 2022 ranked North Brunswick Township High School 166th of 445 schools in the state for their Best High School Report and #4,701 nationally.

The school was the 145th-ranked public high school in New Jersey out of 339 schools statewide in New Jersey Monthly magazine's September 2014 cover story on the state's "Top Public High Schools", using a new ranking methodology. The school had been ranked 158th in the state of 328 schools in 2012, after being ranked 143rd in 2010 out of 322 schools listed. The magazine ranked the school 132nd in 2008 out of 316 schools. The school was ranked 130th in the magazine's September 2006 issue, which surveyed 316 schools across the state.

Schooldigger.com ranked the school 177th out of 376 public high schools statewide in its 2010 rankings (a decrease of 9 positions from the 2009 rank) which were based on the combined percentage of students classified as proficient or above proficient on the language arts literacy and mathematics components of the High School Proficiency Assessment (HSPA).

In the 2018-2019 school year, the school was recognized as a Green Ribbon School by the United States Department of Education for its efforts on sustainability.

== Property and facilities ==
NBTHS is located on a sprawling 10-acre (40,000 m^{2}) property off of U.S. Route 130 South. The school was first built in 1973 to accommodate the growing student population (which, at the time, attended New Brunswick High School). Due to the growing population of students in North Brunswick, the school has undergone two expansions in 1990 and 2004-2006. During the latter renovation project, it was discovered that the land under the high school had served as a garbage dump prior to the construction of the building. This was a chief cause of the delays in the construction project. Another major cause for delay was multiple budgetary issues that required a public vote by township citizens. Apart from standard classrooms, the school has a fully equipped library, six electronic classrooms, several computer labs with both Microsoft Windows and Macintosh computers, industrial-technological rooms, naturally lit art studios, a photography studio with a Darkroom, three gymnasiums, a pool, two music rooms, an auditorium with an orchestra pit, television production studios, and a commons area that serves as a link between the school and outside community.

== Athletics ==
The North Brunswick Township High School Raiders compete in the Greater Middlesex Conference, which is comprised of public and private high schools in the Middlesex County area and operates under the auspices of the New Jersey State Interscholastic Athletic Association (NJSIAA). With 1,320 students in grades 10-12, the school was classified by the NJSIAA for the 2019–20 school year as Group IV for most athletic competition purposes, which included schools with an enrollment of 1,060 to 5,049 students in that grade range. The football team competes in Division 5D of the Big Central Football Conference, which includes 60 public and private high schools in Hunterdon, Middlesex, Somerset, Union and Warren counties, which are broken down into 10 divisions by size and location. The school was classified by the NJSIAA as Group V South for football for 2024–2026, which included schools with 1,333 to 2,324 students.

NBTHS has a wide range of athletic facilities, available to both its student body and the North Brunswick community. With over six multipurpose athletic fields, a six-lane track, a football stadium, five tennis courts, a gymnasium that seats over 1,500 people, and three multipurpose baseball/softball diamonds, the school has long been considered one of the premier athletic facilities in the county. Furthermore, the school is one of the only GMC members that has a six-lane indoor swimming pool and has thus frequently been the host of GMC Championships and state sectional meets. Annually, the school's boys' soccer and girls' swimming teams are among the stronger representatives of the school's athletics, with which numerous state championships have been captured over the last decade. The girls' swim team was undefeated in the 2007-08 season, in addition to being the GMC champions. The school also fields interscholastic sports teams in football, girls' soccer, boys' and girls' tennis, boys' and girls' basketball, baseball, softball, boys and girls' lacrosse, boys' swimming, boys and girls' winter and spring track and field, cross-country, gymnastics, wrestling, boys' and girls' bowling, and golf. Volleyball was introduced in the 2005-06 season. The school's main rivals include the New Brunswick High School Zebras, East Brunswick High School Bears, and the South Brunswick High School Vikings.

The boys' soccer team won the Group III state championship in 1993, defeating Parsippany High School by a score of 2-1 in the tournament final to finish the season with a record of 15-5-2.

The girls swimming team won the Public Group B state championship in 1997.

== Extracurricular activities ==
NBTHS offers close to 35 extracurricular activities for its students, many of which are integrated with the school's academic curriculum. Its DECA program, linked with the school's marketing coursework, has won championships at the regional, state, and national levels. The Model United Nations has won honors at a variety of prestigious conferences, including those held at Harvard University, Georgetown University, and Princeton University. Daedalus, the product of the school's yearbook program, has won awards for excellence in yearbook production across New Jersey and at an annual conference held by Columbia University.

The school also serves as the host to a chapter of the Future Business Leaders of America (FBLA), Key Club, as well as honor societies like the National Honor Society, National Art Honor Society, Spanish Honor Society, French Honor Society, German National Honor Society, Latin Honor Society, and Italian Honor Society.

The Student Government Organization, which is run by mostly students and two faculty, hosts a series of events and opportunities for NBTHS students as well as the greater North Brunswick community throughout the school year, and sometimes even during the summer.

To accommodate the growth of the school's arts program, the North Brunswick Board of Education approved a $67 million expansion that includes a 1,000-seat auditorium, music practice rooms, and theater and film production studios. The school has a marching band, which competes locally in the USBands circuit, along with a full orchestra, choir, jazz band, and winter percussion ensemble.

The school has a full theatre program (The Alchemist Theatre Company), which puts on two mainstage performances and one theatre review in the fall. The 2017-2018 lineup featured a Murder Mystery titled Occupation: Murder, Twelve Angry Men in the fall, Theatre Revue 2018 in the winter, and 42nd Street in the Spring.

Members of NBTHS also participate in the FIRST Robotics Program. Team 25, Raider Robotix, sponsored by local corporation Bristol-Myers Squibb, won the National Championships in 2000 and 2012, finished as world championship finalists in 2003 and 2006, and finished as world championship semifinalists in 2002 and 2011. The team has also consistently won numerous state regionals all across the country as well and received international recognition for its achievements.

Other organizations include the school newspaper (The Banner), Environmental club, language clubs, Film production club, Care-to-Walk Club, Health Careers Club, Human Psych Club, Chemistry Club, Science League, Technology Club, Anime Club, the Academic Team, the Debate Team, the LAMBDA Coalition, and an award-winning literary magazine, Painted Words.

In the 2008-09 school year the mock trial team earned the title of Middlesex County and Central Jersey champions, and ended third in the state; it was the first time in over 30 years that a Middlesex County team advanced to semi-regionals. The mock trial team was disbanded after the 2025-2026 school year.

== Administration ==
The school's principal is Michael Kneller. His administration team includes four assistant principals.

== Notable alumni ==
- James Altucher (born 1968), entrepreneur, blogger, author, podcaster and hedge-fund manager
- Sean Cameron (born 1985), soccer player who has represented Guyana in international play
- Nick DiPillo, head coach of the Le Moyne Dolphins women's basketball team
- Tim Howard (born 1979, class of 1997), former goalkeeper for the US National team who played in the Premier League with Everton and previously with Manchester United
- Jim Norton (born 1968), comedian, Host of the Jim Norton & Sam Roberts on SiriusXM
- Aries Spears (born 1975), (never graduated, was expelled his sophomore year), stand-up comedian, actor and voice artist
- Jenny Xie, poet and educator
