= StockPickr =

- Creator: James Altucher
- Launched: September 2006; 20 years ago (beta); November 2006; 20 years ago (final)
- Current status: Redirected to TheStreet.com

StockPickr was a social networking service and virtual community for sharing stock picks, financial analysis, research, news, and commentary. The website was founded by James Altucher in 2006 and acquired by TheStreet.com in 2007 for $10 million.

It included an Internet forum, a blog, and he makeup of 90,000 stock portfolios, including 800 of professional investors including Warren Buffett, George Soros, and Mark Cuban.

Users were able to rate portfolios, see recommended similar portfolios and get advice of stocks within similar portfolios to help assemble their own.

The website launched in beta version in September 2006 and in final in November 2006. By January 2007, the website had over 10,000 portfolios posted, and over 2,500 registered users.

By August 2007, the website had over 100,000 users, 10 million monthly page views, and was named one of the 50 Best Websites of 2007 by Time.

In April 2007,TheStreet.com acquired the website for $10 million.
