= George T. Reynolds =

American physicist (1917–2005)

George Reynolds
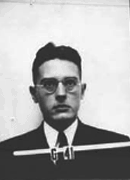
- George T. Reynolds' Los Alamos wartime security badge
- Born: May 27, 1917; Trenton, New Jersey, US
- Died: April 19, 2005 (aged 87); Skillman, New Jersey, US
- Education: Rutgers University; Princeton University
- Scientific career
- Fields: Physics
- Workplaces: Princeton University
- Doctoral advisor: Walker Bleakney

George Thomas Reynolds (May 27, 1917 – April 19, 2005) was an American physicist best known for his accomplishments in particle physics, biophysics and environmental science.

Reynolds received his PhD in physics from Princeton in 1943, writing a thesis of the propagation of shock waves. During World War II, he joined the United States Navy, and served with the Manhattan Project. He worked with George Kistiakowsky on the design of the explosive lenses required by the implosion-type nuclear weapon. He was involved in the investigation of the Port Chicago disaster, served with Project Alberta on Tinian, and was part of the Manhattan Project team sent to Hiroshima and Nagasaki to inspect the bomb damage.

After the war, Reynolds began a long academic career at Princeton University. He was director of the Princeton's High Energy Physics Program from 1948 until 1970, when he became the first director of Princeton's new Center for Environmental Studies. He combined his interest in the sea and science by working during the summers at the Marine Biological Laboratory in Woods Hole, Massachusetts, where he studied marine bioluminescence. He also worked at the Woods Hole Oceanographic Institution.

== Early life ==
George Thomas Reynolds was born in Trenton, New Jersey, on May 27, 1917, the son of George W. Reynolds, a trainmaster for the Pennsylvania Railroad, and his wife Laura, a secretary with the New Jersey Department of Geology. Raised in Highland Park, New Jersey, from the age of two, he attended Franklin Junior High School in his hometown through tenth grade and then New Brunswick High School.

He received a bachelor's degree in physics from Rutgers University in 1939. He then entered Princeton University, where was awarded a Master of Science degree in 1942. He earned his PhD in 1943 under the supervision of Walker Bleakney, writing his thesis "Studies in the production, propagation, and interactions of shock waves".

== Manhattan Project ==
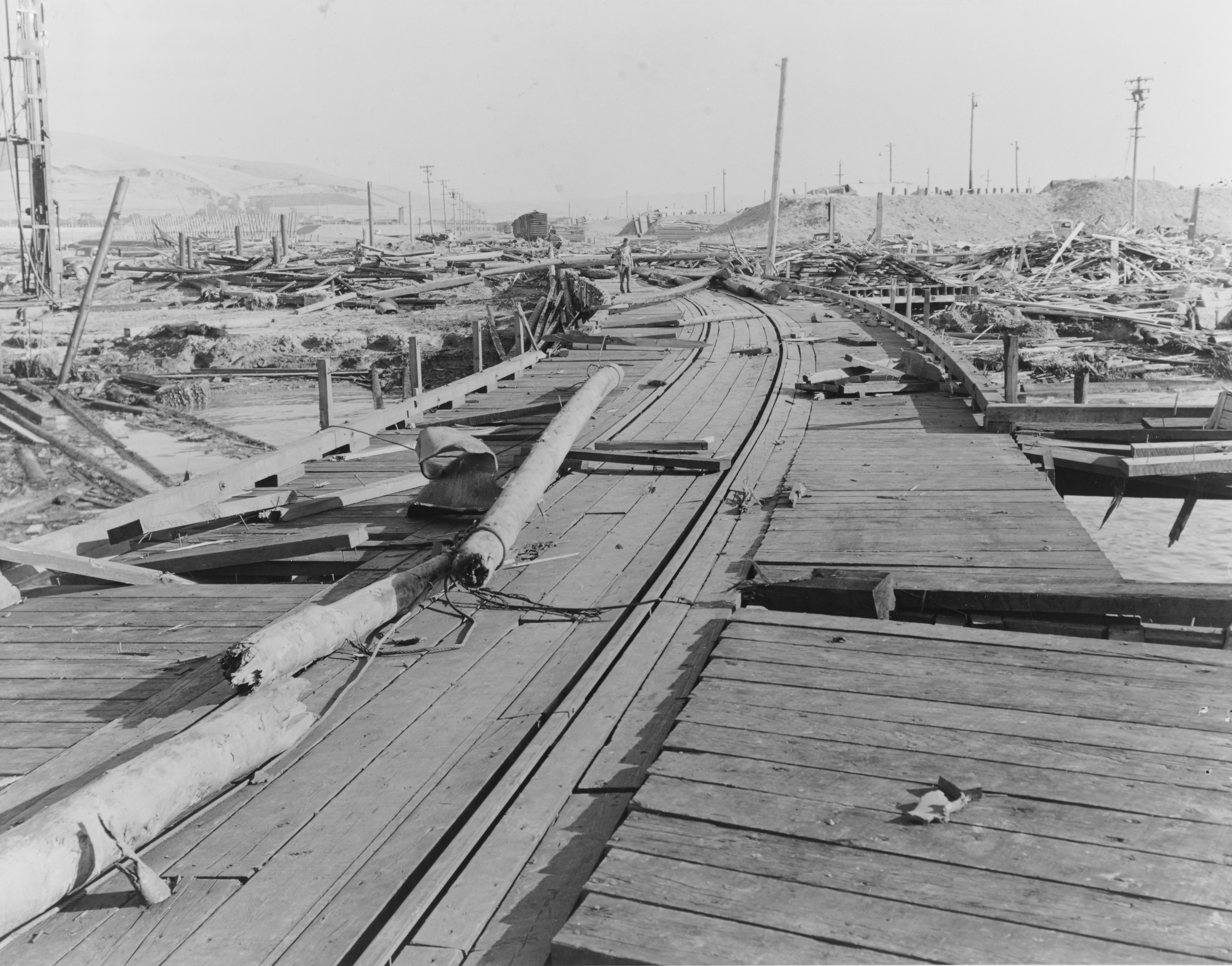
Damage at the Port Chicago Pier after the explosion of July 17, 1944

World War II was raging at this time, and someone with a doctorate in such a topic area was highly sought after by the wartime Manhattan Project, but Reynolds turned down an offer to join it. An avid surf fisherman and sailor, he aspired to join the United States Navy. He attempted to enlist, but was turned down because he wore glasses. He then lobbied the Navy, which waived this requirement. He was then commissioned as an ensign in 1943, and married Virginia Rendall, a librarian, while he waited for his first assignment.

Instead of the seafaring assignment he hoped for, Reynolds was sent to the Manhattan Project's Los Alamos Laboratory to assist George Kistiakowsky in the design of the explosive lenses required by the implosion-type nuclear weapon. In April 1944, Kistiakowsky named Reynolds as one of eleven men that he would like to have working for him at Los Alamos.

Reynolds was one of the naval officers who was sent to investigate the Port Chicago disaster, in which an ammunition ship had blown up in the harbor. He was tasked with estimating the size of the explosion, based upon observations of the damage. His estimate was 1,550 tons of TNT (6,500 GJ) ± 50 tons of TNT (210 GJ) tons. A bill of lading was subsequently found for 1,540 tons, confirming his estimate.

Reynolds was one of several researchers who determined that an atomic bomb would do maximum damage if detonated in the air rather than at ground level.

He later served with Project Alberta, the part of the Manhattan Project for operations in the field. He served on Tinian, where the worked with the X-Unit Section, which was responsible for the Fat Man bomb's firing unit. He flew a number of practice missions, but not the bombing of Hiroshima or Nagasaki. After the fighting ended, he was part of the Manhattan Project team sent to Hiroshima and Nagasaki to inspect the bomb damage.

== Princeton ==
After the war, Reynolds accepted an offer of an assistant professorship at Princeton University. He would spend the rest of his career there, being promoted to associate professor in 1951, and then to professor in 1959. John Archibald Wheeler interested him in cosmic rays. Reynolds was director of Princeton's high-energy physics program from 1948 to 1970. He initially recruited Ronald Rau from Caltech and Joseph Ballam from the University of California. Ballam eventually became a professor and division head at the SLAC National Accelerator Laboratory, while Rau went on to become chairman of the physics department at the Brookhaven National Laboratory. Reynolds later hired Sam Treiman, Giorgio Salvini, Riccardo Giacconi, Val Fitch and Jim Cronin. His reputation for spotting and hiring talent was assured when Giacconi, Fitch and Cronin won Nobel Prizes.

For his cosmic ray research, Reynolds attempted to grow large organic crystal scintillators to use as ionized particle detectors. Scintillators are luminescent materials that, when struck by an incoming particle, absorb its energy and scintillate – emit light. They are used in many areas of scientific research. He was frustrated by cracks in the crystals, and attempted to get around the problem by dissolving them in liquid. To the surprise of many, the liquid was just as effective as crystal scintillators. Today, liquid scintillators are in widespread use in nuclear, biological and medical research. He also developed automated X-ray detectors for collecting data on protein structures.

Interest in environmental issues increased in the late 1960s, and in 1970, Princeton established Princeton's Center for Environmental Studies. Reynolds was appointed as its first director. Under his leadership, it investigated a number of unusual inter-disciplinary topics, such as energy conservation in buildings, indoor air quality, the relationship between nuclear power and nuclear weapons, and the decision-making process in environmental issues

Although most of his career was at Princeton, he spent some time in England, where was a Churchill Fellow at Cambridge University in 1973 and 1974. He was later a visiting senior research fellow at the laboratory of molecular biology at Oxford University, and a visiting professor at Oxford Research Unit of the Open University, from 1981 to 1982, and a Royal Society Guest Research Fellow at Oxford University in 1985.

Reynolds became the Class of 1909 Professor of Physics in 1978, and professor emeritus 1987. For 31 years he combined his interest in the sea and science by working during the summer at the Marine Biological Laboratory in Woods Hole, Massachusetts, where he studied marine bioluminescence. He also worked at the Woods Hole Oceanographic Institution.

Reynolds and his wife, Virginia, had four sons, G. Thomas, Richard, Robert and David. He died from cancer at his home in the Skillman section of Montgomery Township, New Jersey, on April 19, 2005.

== Bibliography ==
- Campbell, Richard H. (2005). The Silverplate Bombers: A History and Registry of the Enola Gay and Other B-29s Configured to Carry Atomic Bombs. Jefferson, North Carolina: McFarland & Company. ISBN 0-7864-2139-8. OCLC 58554961.
- Russ, Harlow W. (1990). Project Alberta: The Preparation of Atomic Bombs For Use in World War II. Los Alamos, New Mexico: Exceptional Books. ISBN 9780944482018. OCLC 24429257.
