= Richard H. Brown =

American businessman

Richard H. Brown was chairman and chief executive officer of Electronic Data Systems Corporation from 1999 to 2003; chief executive officer of Cable & Wireless plc from 1996 to 1998; a director of E.I. du Pont de Nemours and Company from 2001 to 2015 and a director of Home Depot.

President and chief executive officer of H&R Block, Inc. and vice chairman of Ameritech Corporation. He is a member of The Business Council, and a former member of the U.S.-Japan Business Council; the French-American Business Council and the President's National Security Telecommunications Advisory Committee.

In 2003, BusinessWeek included Brown in its list of worst managers for 2002.

Brown graduated in 1965 from New Brunswick High School and was inducted in its 2008 class of distinguished alumni.
