= Shiny Misfits =

2024 graphic novel

- Date: April 16, 2024
- Page count: 256 pages
- Publisher: Graphix/Scholastic

Creative team
- Writer: Maysoon Zayid
- Artist: Shadia Amin

Shiny Misfits is a 2024 graphic novel written by Maysoon Zayid and illustrated by Shadia Amin. It was published by Graphix.

== Plot Summary ==
Bay Ann is a young girl with cerebral palsy who becomes the subject of a viral video of a classmate catching her when she falls during the schools talent show. Frustrated with how the video portrays her as helpless, she starts to seek out fame.

== Reception ==
Reception to the book was largely positive. It received starred reviews from Kirkus Reviews, which described it as "comical, nuanced, and visually engaging", and Booklist. It was also reviewed by the School Library Journal. Betsy Bird of Fuse #8, A School Library Journal Blog, praised the book, stating that "Bound to win over fans and a hell of a lotta hearts as well, this is one cool book".

Read NZ Te Pou Muramura described the book as a "a fun and enjoyable read, with some really important messages to share with younger readers", though it criticized Bay Ann's personality and found some sections of the art difficult to follow.

Ollie Kaplan of The Mary Sue labeled it as one of the best middle-grade and YA graphic novels of 2024.
