= New Brunswick High School =

High school in Middlesex County, New Jersey, US

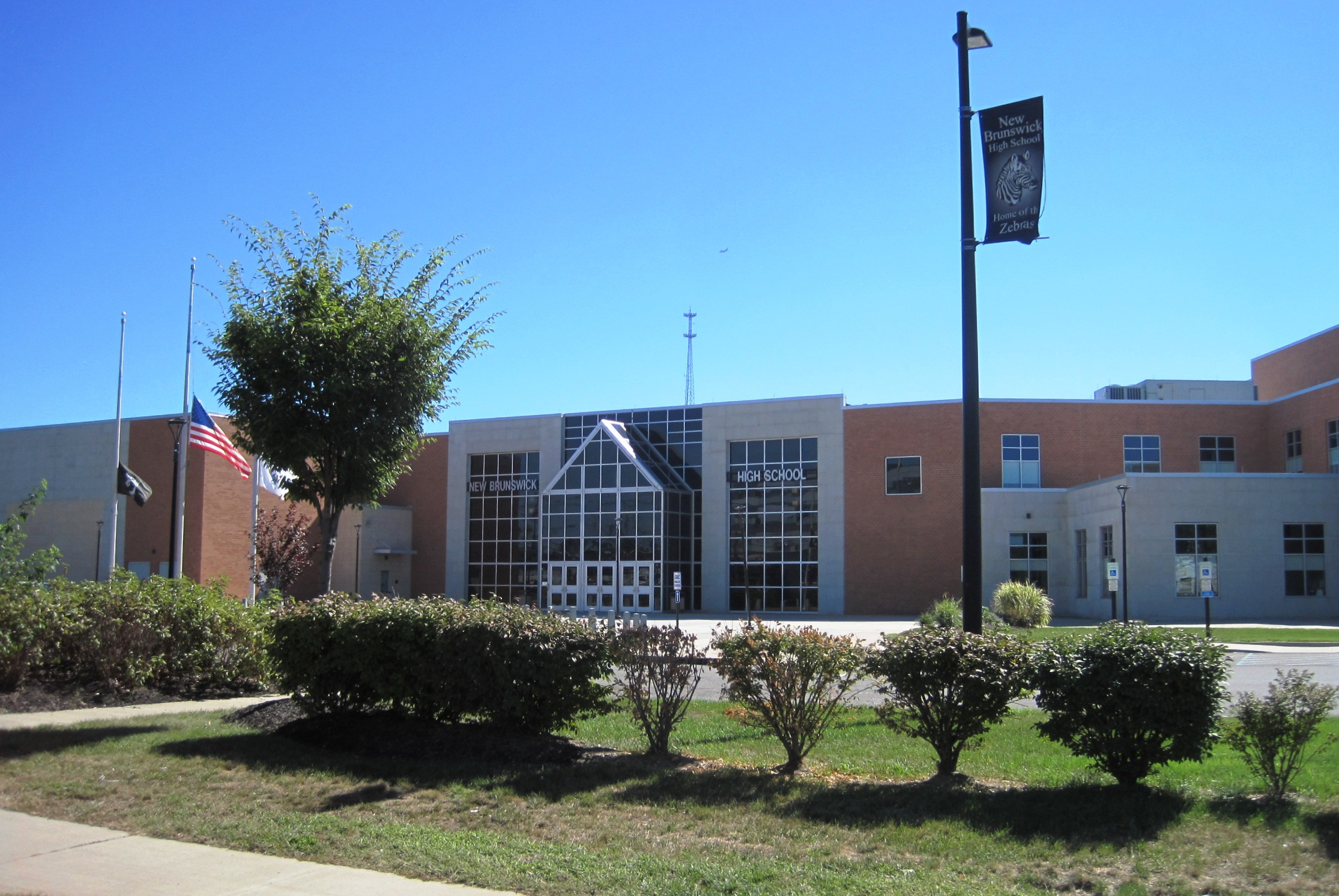

Location
- 1000 Somerset Street; New Brunswick, Middlesex County, New Jersey 08901; United States; 40.48056°N 74.48167°W

Information
- Type: Public high school
- Established: 1875
- School district: New Brunswick Public Schools
- NCES School ID: 341122003454
- Principal: Cary Fields
- Faculty: 172.9 FTEs
- Grades: 9–12
- Enrollment: 2,443 (as of 2024–25)
- Student to teacher ratio: 14.1:1
- Colors: Dark Blue; White
- Athletics conference: Greater Middlesex Conference (general); Big Central Football Conference (football)
- Team name: Zebras
- Website: hs.nbpschools.net

New Brunswick High School (NBHS) is a four-year comprehensive public high school serving students in ninth through twelfth grades in New Brunswick, in Middlesex County, in the U.S. state of New Jersey, operating as the main secondary school of the New Brunswick Public Schools.

As of the 2024–25 school year, the school had an enrollment of 2,443 students and 172.9 classroom teachers (on an FTE basis), for a student–teacher ratio of 14.1:1. ]] and 278 (11.4% of students) eligible for reduced-cost lunch.

== History ==
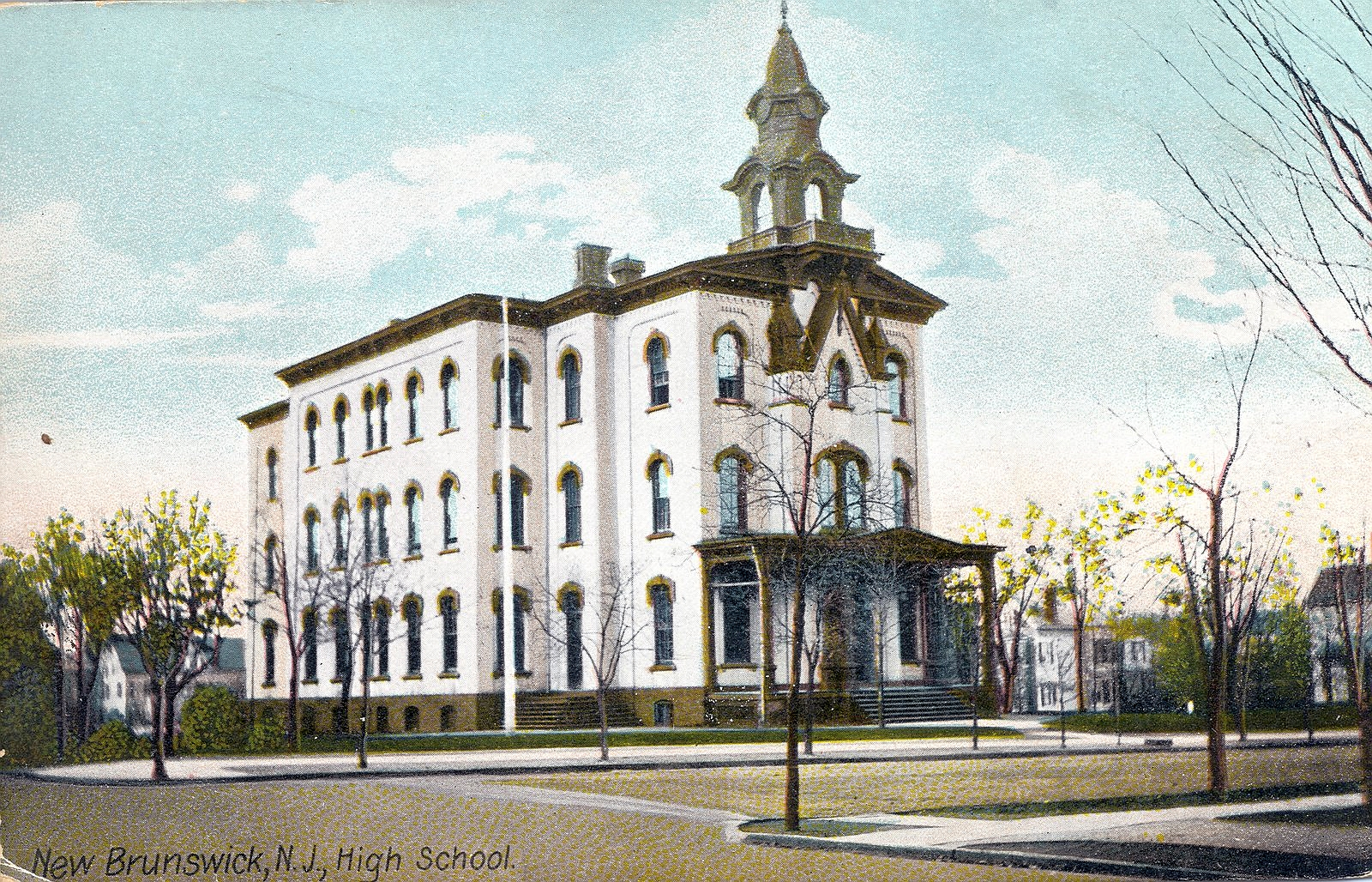
The 1875 NBHS building

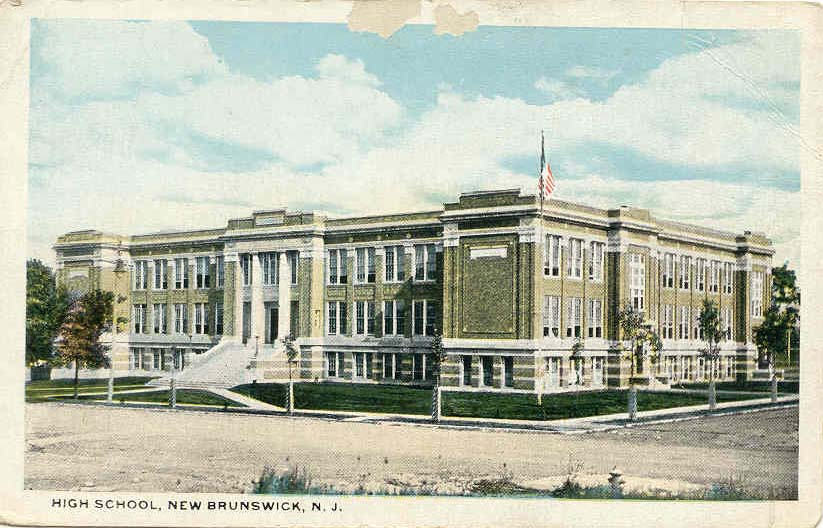
The 1916 NBHS building (before expansions)

The first dedicated high school facility in New Brunswick, known as Livingston Avenue High School, was built in 1875 on the Livingston Avenue property where Roosevelt Elementary School currently stands. Previously, the "high school department" took up the second and third floors of the Bayard Street School, and the New Brunswick's first graduating high school class was in July 1869.

The second high school facility was completed in 1916, and contained 30 classrooms and an 800-seat auditorium. A new gymnasium was built as part of an addition in 1941, and another addition was built in 1945. This facility was repurposed as A. Chester Redshaw Elementary School following the construction of the current high school facility. Redshaw Elementary was closed in 2005 and demolished in 2006, and a new elementary school is planned for the site.

The next facility was located on Livingston Avenue, near the North Brunswick Township border, and was completed in 1964. The 166,000-square-foot (15,400 m^{2}) facility contains 67 classrooms (including dedicated classrooms for music and industrial arts classes), a gymnasium, a cafeteria, an auditorium, a library, and office space. The school was originally built to hold 1,200 students, and overcrowding necessitated the use of modular classrooms.

The North Brunswick Township Public Schools had sent students to New Brunswick High School until North Brunswick Township High School was completed in 1973 at a cost of $10 million and had been opened to the district's students in grades seven through nine. The New Brunswick Public Schools sought to prevent the shift of 280 students who would have attended high school in New Brunswick from attending the new facility, arguing that the withdrawal of the almost entirely white students from North Brunswick and Milltown would leave the New Brunswick school with an disproportionately minority enrollment.

The current high school building opened in January 2010. The 400,000-square-foot (37,000 m^{2}) facility, constructed at a cost of $185 million, is located on Route 27. The previous high school building was converted into a middle school for grades 6 through 8, to open in September 2010.

== Awards, recognition, and rankings ==
The school was the 287th-ranked public high school in New Jersey out of 339 schools statewide in New Jersey Monthly magazine's September 2014 cover story on the state's "Top Public High Schools," using a new ranking methodology. The school had been ranked 293rd in the state of 328 schools in 2012, after being ranked 282nd in 2010 out of 322 schools listed. The magazine ranked the school 303rd in 2008 out of 316 schools. The school was ranked 302nd in the magazine's September 2006 issue, which surveyed 316 schools across the state.

== Student body ==
The Class of 2014 had a 63% graduation rate.

As of 2013–14 school year, the school's population was 82.6% Hispanic, 15.9% African-American, 0.7% were Asian / Pacific Islander, 0.7% were White. Among students, 51.5% speak English as their first language at home, while 48.1% speak Spanish; 17.0% of students had a disability, 86.2% were economically disadvantaged and 10.6% of students had limited English proficiency.

The school has a Student Exchange Program, with various nations. Some neighboring countries went through with the program and students from NBHS went to China, India, and Japan.

== Athletics ==
The New Brunswick High School Zebras compete in the Greater Middlesex Conference (GMC), which is comprised of public and private high schools in the Middlesex County area and operates under the supervision of the New Jersey State Interscholastic Athletic Association (NJSIAA). With 1,704 students in grades 10–12, the school was classified by the NJSIAA for the 2019–20 school year as Group IV for most athletic competition purposes, which included schools with an enrollment of 1,060 to 5,049 students in that grade range. The football team competes in Division 5D of the Big Central Football Conference, which includes 60 public and private high schools in Hunterdon, Middlesex, Somerset, Union and Warren counties, which are broken down into 10 divisions by size and location. The school was classified by the NJSIAA as Group V South for football for 2024–2026, which included schools with 1,333 to 2,324 students.

Interscholastic athletic programs offered by NBHS include football, baseball, basketball, softball, soccer, cross country, tennis, golf, bowling, track and field, volleyball, and wrestling. The school's mascot is the zebra. The school's athletic facilities include a gymnasium, a football stadium (Memorial Stadium), baseball diamonds and a running track.

The football team won the Central Jersey Group II state sectional title in 2003 and the North II Group III title in 2006. The team finished the season with a 12–0 record after winning the Central Jersey Group IV state sectional title by a 21–14 score against Long Branch High School in the championship game; the 2003 team earned consideration from the Courier News as one of "the best in GMC history".

== Electives and extracurricular activities ==
NBHS currently offers a significant variety of extracurricular activities for students, including over 40 clubs, and nearly 20 student organizations. There are clubs devoted to languages and cultures, academic fields, sports, fitness, music, art, computers, and other interests and skills. Student organizations include chapters of the National Honor Society, the Key Club, and the International Thespian Society, as well as a student council, a school newspaper, and groups that design the school's yearbook and Spectrum Literary & Art Magazine. NBHS also offers the U.S. Army JROTC program as an elective.

=== Theatre program ===
NBHS offers courses and clubs focusing on various aspects of theatre arts, including music and acting. In the spring of 2002, participants in these groups, as well as several art-related classes, became involved in the school's first musical theatre presentation in years – a production of Once on This Island, which was followed by West Side Story the next year. Since then, NBHS has put together productions of such shows as A Chorus Line, Grease, Seussical the Musical, Smokey Joe's Cafe, The Wiz, High School Musical, Footloose, Two By Two, Little Shop of Horrors, The Apple Tree, In the Heights, They're Playing Our Song, Putting It Together, Hello, Dolly!, The Fantasticks, Once Upon A Mattress, The Little Mermaid and You're a Good Man, Charlie Brown.

In 2008, the theatre program added a play each season in addition to the musical. Play productions have included A Christmas Carol, Romeo and Juliet and Hamlet Too!, Dracula, Oedipus Rex, The Tempest, Twelve Angry Jurors, Gallery of One-Act Plays, Blinders, Project Othello, Almost, Maine, Love/Sick and State of Independence, a collection of student-written plays.

In 2009, NBHS founded Chapter 7638 of the International Thespian Society (Educational Theatre Association).

The Theatre Program has regularly participated in residencies and talks with many professional arts organizations, including CoLAB Arts, McCarter Theatre, Spotlight on Festivals, State Theatre, Arts Across America, George Street Playhouse, Mason Gross School of the Arts, and TADA! Youth Theater.

In addition to these activities, the theatre program currently collaborates with other NBHS teachers and students (of Fine, Visual and Performing Arts) to curate the Annual Festival of the Arts.

== Administration ==
Since 2025, the school's principal has been Cary Fields. Her administration team includes four vice principals, one for each grade.

== Controversies ==
=== Enrollment of Hyejeong Shin ===
On January 16, 2023, 29-year-old Hyejeong Shin, a graduate of Rutgers University, enrolled in New Brunswick High School using a falsified birth certificate and was accepted into school without a prior background check. Shin began attending classes for the next four days before being caught by school officials later that same week. School officials held a Board of Education meeting in the high school's auditorium on January 24, 2023. Stated by Aubrey Johnson, superintendent of the New Brunswick Public Schools district, was the following:

"Last week, by filing false documents, an adult female posing as a student was able to be enrolled in our high school. She attended school for four days, I can't tell you if she was here for the entire block schedule, she was in few classes in the most time in our guidance week as we were trying to get more information from her."

Many students and parents were outraged following the discovery of her true identity. Students had claimed that Shin had been communicating with other female students via texting and were told to meet up at Commercial Avenue, allegedly as a way to recruit them for sex trafficking. By the next week, in response, a large majority of students held a protest out on school hallways, demanding for justice and improved security.

=== Anti-Palestinian assignment ===
In March 25, 2025, a teacher faced criticism for an educational assignment about the Palestinian student activist Mahmoud Khalil, who was facing deportation. The assignment, part of an "Introduction to Law" class, was accused of manipulating students with misleading and incorrect information, depicting Khalil, an anti-war protester, in a negative light by falsely associating him with terrorism and inaccurately linking him to violent events. Educational advocates, parents, and members of the Council on American-Islamic Relations (CAIR) criticized the assignment for attempting to manipulate students with false information, arguing that the teacher was pushing for a biased response by presenting distorted views and inaccurate portrayals of Mahmoud Khalil's activism. This controversy led to the withdrawal of the assignment and calls for accountability against the teacher.

== Notable alumni ==
- Gary Brokaw (born 1954), former player in the NBA
- Dana Brown (born 1967, class of 1985), general manager of the Houston Astros of Major League Baseball
- Richard H. Brown (class of 1965), chairman and chief executive officer of Electronic Data Systems
- Glen Burtnik (born 1955), singer, songwriter, entertainer and multi-instrumentalist, best known as a former member of the band Styx
- Jonathan Casillas (born 1987), linebacker for the New Orleans Saints Super Bowl XLIV and New England Patriots Super Bowl XLIX champions
- J. Edward Crabiel (1916–1992), politician who served in the New Jersey Senate and as New Jersey Secretary of State, until forced to resign
- Andre Dixon (born 1986), former professional football running back
- Irving Freese (born 1903), mayor of Norwalk, Connecticut, and the third Socialist mayor elected in the United States
- Mel Harris (born 1956), actress
- Al Hermann (1899–1980), political operative and professional baseball player
- Don Highsmith (born 1948), former NFL running back who played for the Green Bay Packers and the Oakland Raiders
- Dwayne Jarrett (born 1986), former wide receiver for the Carolina Panthers, MVP of the 2007 Rose Bowl Game
- Louis Lasagna (1923–2003), physician and professor of medicine, known for his revision of the Hippocratic Oath
- Leroy Lins (1913–1986), professional basketball player who played for the Akron Goodyear Wingfoots in the National Basketball League
- Roy Mack (1889–1962), director of film shorts, mostly comedies, with 205 titles to his credit
- Spaceman Patterson (born 1954, class of 1972), guitarist and producer
- Frank M. Pelly (born 1933, class of 1951), politician who served in the New Jersey General Assembly from the 18th Legislative District from 1982 to 1991
- George T. Reynolds (1917–2005), physicist best known for his accomplishments in particle physics, biophysics and environmental science
- Norman Tanzman (1918–2004, class of 1935), politician who served in the New Jersey General Assembly from 1962 to 1968 and in the New Jersey Senate from 1968 to 1974
- Tony Vega (1961–2013), Thoroughbred jockey and community activist
- Eric Young (born 1967), former Major League Baseball player who is now a coach
