= James Altucher =

American hedge fund manager

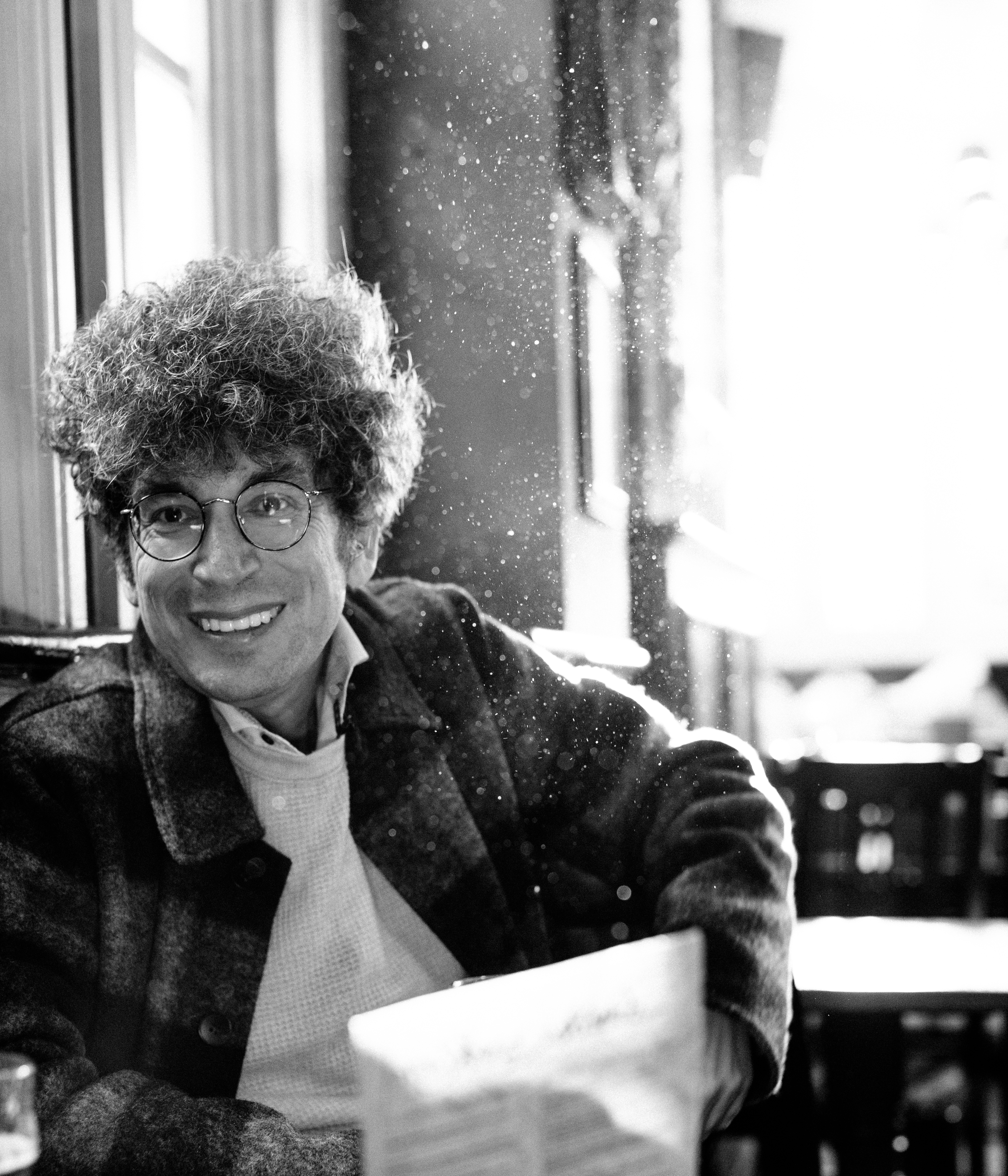
- Altucher in 2018
- Born: January 22, 1968 (age 58); New York City, U.S.
- Education: Cornell University; Carnegie Mellon University
- Occupations: Author, hedge fund manager
- Known for: Entrepreneurship, podcasting, blogging
- Notable work: The Power of No (2014); Choose Yourself (2013)
- Website: jamesaltucher.com

James Altucher (born January 22, 1968) is an American hedge-fund manager, author, podcaster and entrepreneur who has founded or cofounded over 20 companies. He has published 20 books and is a contributor to publications including The Financial Times, The Wall Street Journal, TechCrunch, and The Huffington Post.

== Early life and education ==
Altucher was raised in a Jewish family in North Brunswick, New Jersey. Altucher attended North Brunswick Township High School and graduated in 1986. Altucher graduated from Cornell University with a bachelor's degree in computer science in 1989.

== Career ==
Altucher's first job after graduating was in the IT department at HBO. At one point, Altucher hosted a web-series for HBO.com called III:am.

In 1998, Altucher left HBO, sold a company he founded, Reset Inc., for approximately $15 million, and used the proceeds to fund new internet investments. Altucher has said he began this period with $15 million and lost it all in two years, which led him to re-evaluate his approach to both business and life. During this time, Jim Cramer of TheStreet.com hired him to write about stocks, and Altucher began trading for hedge funds.

From 2002 to 2005, he traded for several hedge funds, and, from 2004 to 2006, ran a fund of hedge funds.

In 2006, Altucher founded the financial social network, StockPickr. The website was named one of Time Magazine's 50 Best Websites of 2007. Altucher sold the company for $10 million in 2007.

In 2017, he began advising on cryptocurrency investing, despite having condemned Bitcoin in 2013 as "a fad, or a scam, or a Ponzi scheme, or worse." However, in May, 2013, he built a store to sell his book, "Choose Yourself" for Bitcoin a month before he released it on Amazon. He was interviewed by Business Insider about why he reversed his stance on Bitcoin.

Altucher was a seed investor in Buddy Media, which later sold to Salesforce.com for $745 million in 2012.

=== Podcasts ===
==== Ask Altucher ====
This podcast was 369 episodes in total between 4/21/2014 until 10/8/2015. The podcast became “temporarily unavailable” to listen to, sometime in May 2024.

==== Question of the Day ====
In August 2015, Altucher launched a podcast with Stephen Dubner, co-author of Freakonomics, called Question of the Day, based on questions from Quora. This has since finished but had a reunion in 2020.

==== The James Altucher Show ====
Altucher also hosts The James Altucher Show, which has featured Tim Ferriss, Mark Cuban, and Arianna Huffington, among others. Altucher says it has more than 40 million downloads.

=== Authorship ===
The author of over 20 books, Altucher's work has appeared on The Wall Street Journal best-seller list and USA Today's list of best business books of all time in 2014.

- Skip the Line: The 10,000 Experiments Rule and Other Surprising Advice for Reaching Your Goals (2021) ISBN 0753557967
- What To Do When You Are Rejected? (2018) ASIN B0795WSQ7S
- Reinvent Yourself (2017) ISBN 9781541137134
- My Daddy Owns All of Outer Space (2016) ISBN 1540340961
- The Power of ASK: Ask for What You Want, Get What You Want (2015) ISBN 1401946216
- The Choose Yourself Guide to Wealth (2015) ISBN 150100994X
- The Rich Employee (2015) ISBN 1517088720
- The Power of No (2014) ISBN 1401945872
- The Choose Yourself Stories (2014) ISBN 1500193410
- Choose Yourself: Be Happy, Make Millions, Live the Dream (2013) ISBN 1490382887
- The Seven Habits of Highly Effective Mediocre People (2013) ASIN B00C4E1FDG
- Faq Me (2012) ISBN 1479256560
- 40 Alternatives to College (2012) ISBN 1479269387
- How To Be The Luckiest Person Alive! (2011) ISBN 9781461120704
- I Was Blind But Now I See: Time to Be Happy (2011) ISBN 9781466347953
- The Altucher Confidential: Ideas for a World Out of Balance, a Round Table Comic (2011) ISBN 1939418070
- The Wall Street Journal Guide to Investing in the Apocalypse: Make Money by Seeing Opportunity Where Others See Peril (2011) ISBN 9780062001320
- The Forever Portfolio: How to Pick Stocks that You Can Hold for the Long Run (2008) ISBN 1591842115
- SuperCash: The New Hedge Fund Capitalism (2006) ISBN 0471745995
- Trade Like Warren Buffett (2005) ISBN 0471655848
- Trade Like a Hedge Fund: 20 Successful Uncorrelated Strategies and Techniques to Winning Profits (2004) ISBN 0471484857

== Personal life ==
Altucher is a co-owner of Stand Up NY, where he also performs stand-up comedy. Jerry Seinfeld said of the club, "It could use a little sprucing up." He is a National Chess Master with an Elo rating of 2204 as of 2012.

In August 2020, Altucher published a piece on LinkedIn titled "New York Is Dead Forever. Here's Why." In response to Altucher's piece, Jerry Seinfeld called him "some putz", accused him of "whimpering and whining", and told him to "shut up". Altucher used to write often about his second wife, Claudia Azula Altucher, on his blog. The two later divorced.
