= North Brunswick Township Public Schools =

Place in Middlesex County, New Jersey, US

Coordinates: 40.418035°N 74.500859°W

Address
- 25 Linwood Place North Brunswick, Middlesex County, New Jersey, 08902; United States

District information
- Grades: PreK-12
- Superintendent: Brian Zychowski (interim)
- Business administrator: Rosa Hock
- Schools: 8

Students and staff
- Enrollment: 5,926 (as of 2024–25)
- Faculty: 584.0 FTEs
- Student–teacher ratio: 10.2:1

Other information
- District Factor Group: FG
- Website: www.nbtschools.org
Ind.	Per pupil	District spending	Rank (*)	K-12 average	%± vs. average
1A	Total Spending	$15,830	11	$18,891	−16.2%
1	Budgetary Cost	12,398	11	14,783	−16.1%
2	Classroom Instruction	7,953	21	8,763	−9.2%
6	Support Services	1,728	17	2,392	−27.8%
8	Administrative Cost	1,078	5	1,485	−27.4%
10	Operations & Maintenance	1,382	25	1,783	−22.5%
13	Extracurricular Activities	219	40	268	−18.3%
16	Median Teacher Salary	59,960	30	64,043
Data from NJDoE 2014 Taxpayers' Guide to Education Spending. *Of K-12 districts with more than 3,500 students. Lowest spending=1; Highest=103

The North Brunswick Township Public Schools is a comprehensive community public school district that serve students in pre-kindergarten through twelfth grade from North Brunswick, in Middlesex County, in the U.S. state of New Jersey.

As of the 2024–25 school year, the district, comprised of eight schools, had an enrollment of 5,926 students and 584.0 classroom teachers (on an FTE basis), for a student–teacher ratio of 10.2:1.

== History ==
The four elementary schools, John Adams Elementary School, Arthur M. Judd Elementary School, Livingston Park Elementary School, and Parsons Elementary School, were all redistricted the summer before the 2008–09 scholastic year to adjust to the growing population of North Brunswick Township.

On December 13, 2016, a referendum was held to build a new middle school (called North Brunswick Township Middle School) on vacant land at U.S. Route 130 and Renaissance Boulevard North, which was passed by voters (1,807 in favor and 1,648 against). Ground was broken in September 2017 with construction to be completed in time for the 2020-21 school year. The new middle school will only house 7th and 8th grade students, instead of 6th through 8th.

As a result, Linwood Middle School, which housed grades 6-8, become a 5-6 school (as the district's elementary schools were also overcrowded) and a wing of the school became the Early Childhood Center and the Board of Education office.

The prior Early Childhood Center, which was located in nearby Milltown in a building the district has leased, would no longer be used by the North Brunswick district. The board of education office was located in the former Maple Meade School, which will be sold and likely demolished after the offices are moved out and into Linwood School.

The district had been classified by the New Jersey Department of Education as being in District Factor Group "FG", the fourth-highest of eight groupings. District Factor Groups organize districts statewide to allow comparison by common socioeconomic characteristics of the local districts. From lowest socioeconomic status to highest, the categories are A, B, CD, DE, FG, GH, I and J.

== Awards, recognition and honors ==
John Adams School was recognized in 1998-99 by the National Blue Ribbon Schools Program. The district's high school was recognized in 1999-2000.

== Schools ==
Schools in the district (with 2024–25 enrollment data from the National Center for Education Statistics) are:

Pre-school

- North Brunswick Township Early Childhood Center with 106 students in PreK
  - Scott Passner, principal

Elementary schools

- John Adams Elementary School with 561 students in grades PreK–4
  - Lauren Finnegan, principal
- Arthur M. Judd Elementary School with 587 students in grades PreK–4
  - Veronica Glover, principal
- Livingston Park Elementary School with 494 students in grades PreK–4
  - Sidney Dawson, principal
- Parsons Elementary School with 566 students in grades PreK–4
  - Tracy Quattrocchi, principal
- Linwood School with 761 students in grades 5–6
  - Janton "JD" Shorter, principal

Middle school

- North Brunswick Township Middle School with 754 students in grades 7–8
  - Richard H. Selover Jr., principal

High school

- North Brunswick Township High School completed in 1973, with 1,876 students in grades 9–12
  - Michael Kneller, principal

== Administration ==
Core members of the district's administration are:

- Brian Zychowski, interim superintendent
- Rosa Hock, business administrator and board secretary

Janet Ciarrocca retired as superintendent in 2025 and Zychowski, the district's superintendent prior to his retirement in 2021, was brought back as interim superintendent for the 2025–2026 school year.

== Board of education ==
The district's board of education, comprised of nine members, sets policy and oversees the fiscal and educational operation of the district through its administration. As a Type II school district, the board's trustees are elected directly by voters to serve three-year terms of office on a staggered basis, with three seats up for election each year held (since 2012) as part of the November general election. The board appoints a superintendent to oversee the district's day-to-day operations and a business administrator to supervise the business functions of the district.
