= Stand Up NY =

Comedy club in Manhattan, New York

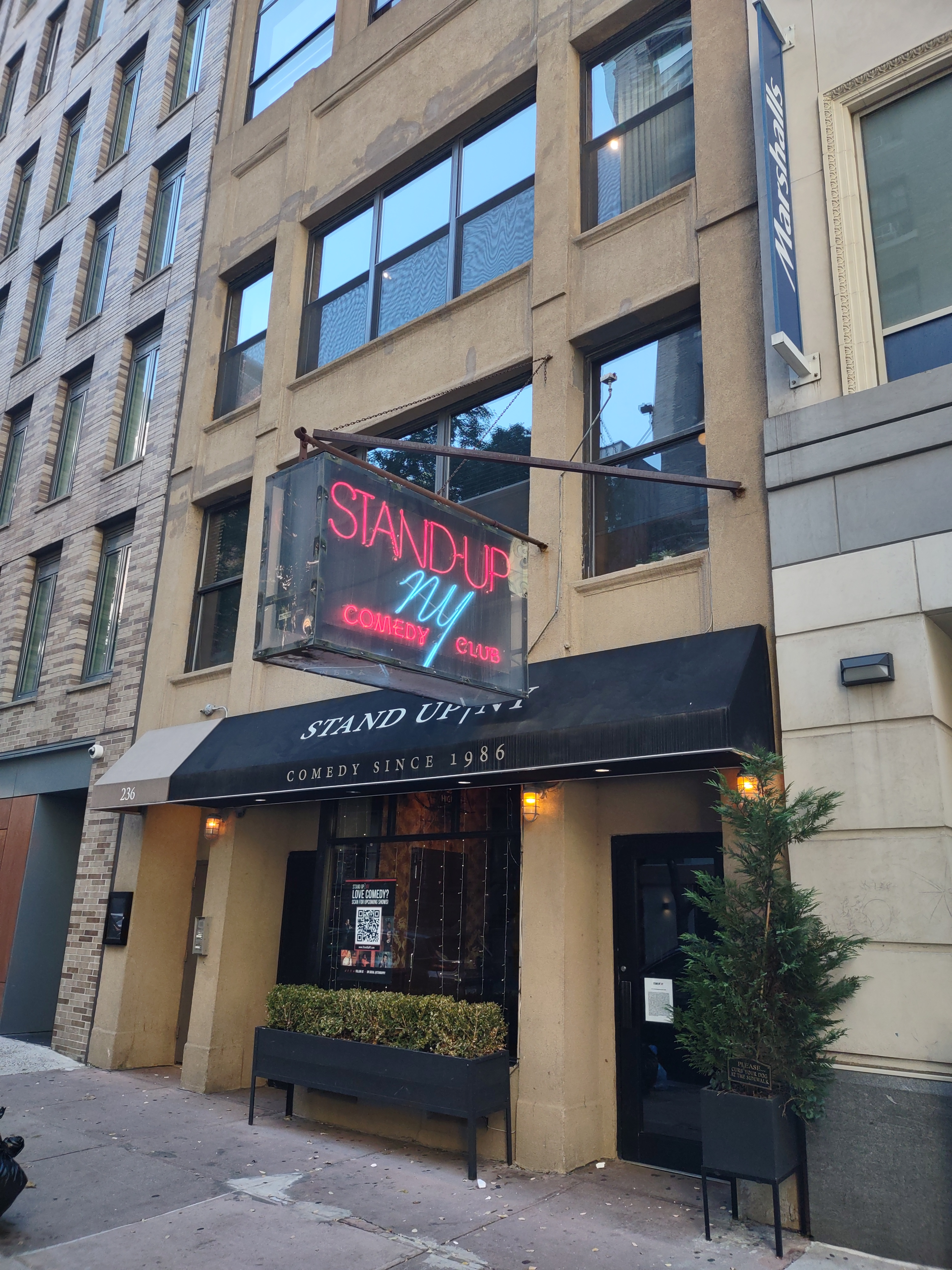
- Interactive map of Stand Up NY
- Address: 221 West 46th Street; New York, NY 10036
- Location: Times Square, Manhattan, New York City
- Coordinates: 40.759374°N 73.986174°W
- Owner: Dani Zoldan, Gabe Waldman, James Altucher
- Capacity: 120
- Type: Comedy club

Construction
- Opened: 1986

Website
- www.standupny.com

Stand Up NY is a comedy club located in New York City's Times Square on 221 West 46th Street. Originally founded in 1986 at 236 West 78th Street on Manhattan's Upper West Side, it is one of New York City's oldest comedy clubs, known for featuring diverse lineups of well-known and local comedians. Comedians Chris Rock, Jerry Seinfeld, and Jon Stewart have performed here. Past performers at Stand-Up New York include: Louis C.K., Susie Essman, Mike Birbiglia, Lewis Black, Judah Friedlander, John Oliver, Jay Oakerson, Hannibal Buress, Godfrey, Dave Attell, Anthony Jeselnik, Aziz Ansari, and Amy Schumer.

Originally owned by then television writer and producer, now Broadway performer Cary Hoffman, the club was bought as it was struggling financially in 2008 by Dani Zoldan and Gabe Waldman, who both frequented the club as teenagers. The two immediately employed prominent interior designer Steve Lewis for the roomy, 110-seat space, composed of both a bar and showroom. Within ten months of Zoldan and Waldman taking over, revenue had tripled.

In 2020, the club relocated to Bond 45 in Times Square, partnering with the restaurant to offer a dinner-and-show experience, with shows now performed in a 120-seat showroom above the dining area. The club offers a $85 package including a three-course meal, show, tax, and tip, enhancing the comedy experience.

The club is now owned by former hedge fund manager James Altucher, who wrote a post on LinkedIn on August 13, 2020, stating that “NYC is dead forever” as a result of the COVID-19 pandemic. This prompted comedian Jerry Seinfeld to call him a “putz” in an op-ed in The New York Times. In the same op-ed, Seinfeld said of Stand Up NY, "It could use a little sprucing up."

The club offers shows seven days a week with a showcase format, meaning each of the five to seven comedians performs for 10-20 minutes. A regular week consists of two shows Sunday through Thursday, three shows on Friday, and four shows on Saturday. Stand Up New York also hosts open-mics every weekday and rents out the venue for private events.

Special events, such as "Lunchtime Laughs," a 45-minute live stand-up taping streamed on Zeam Studio’s Big Apple Live channel, occur at alternate venues like Zeam Studios (1021 6th Ave, NY 10018), with limited seating (e.g., 20 seats for the March 26, 2025, show).

In early 2013, Stand-Up NY started a new venture called Stand Up NY Labs: a place where free comedy podcasts and videos are produced featuring comedians affiliated with Stand-Up NY. Located directly above the original club, the Stand Up NY Labs recorded podcasts such as "Tuesdays with Stories" with Joe List and Mark Normand, "Charlie Murphy Presents" with Charlie Murphy, "We Know Nothing" with Nikki Glaser, "Race Wars" with Kurt Metzger and Sherrod Small, "My Sexy Podcast" with Sabrina Jalees, and "Invasion of Privacy" with Joe Santagato and Kate Wolff. The Labs’ current status at Bond 45 is unclear as of March 2025, with no recent activity noted at the new location.
