= New Brunswick Public Schools =

School district in Middlesex County, New Jersey, US

Address
- 268 Baldwin Street New Brunswick, Middlesex County, New Jersey, 08901; United States
- Coordinates: 40.494759°N 74.443764°W

District information
- Grades: PreK to 12
- Superintendent: Aubrey A. Johnson
- Business administrator: Dorenia Villalona
- Schools: 12
- Affiliation: Former Abbott district

Students and staff
- Enrollment: 9,690 (as of 2022–23)
- Faculty: 777.4 FTEs
- Student–teacher ratio: 12.5:1

Other information
- District Factor Group: A
- Website: www.nbpschools.net
Ind.	Per pupil	District spending	Rank (*)	K-12 average	%± vs. average
1A	Total Spending	$22,586	93	$18,891	19.6%
1	Budgetary Cost	17,592	96	14,783	19.0%
2	Classroom Instruction	10,181	94	8,763	16.2%
6	Support Services	2,952	88	2,392	23.4%
8	Administrative Cost	1,588	73	1,485	6.9%
10	Operations & Maintenance	2,686	97	1,783	50.6%
13	Extracurricular Activities	123	6	268	−54.1%
16	Median Teacher Salary	65,262	55	64,043
Data from NJDoE 2014 Taxpayers' Guide to Education Spending. *Of K-12 districts with more than 3,500 students. Lowest spending=1; Highest=103

New Brunswick Public Schools is a comprehensive community public school district that serves students in pre-kindergarten through twelfth grade in New Brunswick, Middlesex County, in the U.S. state of New Jersey. The district is one of 31 former Abbott districts statewide that were established pursuant to the decision by the New Jersey Supreme Court in Abbott v. Burke which are now referred to as "SDA districts" based on the requirement for the state to cover all costs for school building and renovation projects in these districts under the supervision of the New Jersey Schools Development Authority.

As of the 2022–23 school year, the district, comprising 12 schools, had an enrollment of 9,690 students and 777.4 classroom teachers (on an FTE basis), for a student–teacher ratio of 12.5:1.

The district is classified by the New Jersey Department of Education as being in District Factor Group "A", the lowest of eight groupings. District Factor Groups organize districts statewide to allow comparison by common socioeconomic characteristics of the local districts. From lowest socioeconomic status to highest, the categories are A, B, CD, DE, FG, GH, I and J.

== History ==
The Blanquita B. Valenti Community School, named for the first Hispanic resident to serve on the board of education and on the city council, was constructed at a cost of $55 million and opened in September 2023.

== Schools ==
Schools in the district (with 2022–23 enrollment data from the National Center for Education Statistics) are:

Elementary schools

- Lincoln Elementary School (578; K-4)
  - JoAnn Kocis, principal
- Livingston Elementary School (342; K-5)
  - Nadine Sanchez, principal
- Lord Stirling Elementary School (490; PreK-5)
  - Ellen Treadway, principal
- McKinley Community Elementary School (640; PreK-8)
  - Janene M. Rodriguez, principal
  - Kevin Jarido, interim principal
- A. Chester Redshaw Elementary School (784; PreK-5)
  - Iris Castillo, principal
- Paul Robeson Community School For The Arts (665; K-8)
  - Violet Robinson, principal
- Roosevelt Elementary School (609; K-5)
  - Gisela Ciancia, principal
- Blanquita B. Valenti Community School (opened 2023-24: 569 in grades 4–8)
  - Ellen Treadway, principal
- Robert J. Boyler Elementary School (formerly Woodrow Wilson Elementary School) (373; PreK-8)
  - Michael Chiodo, principal

Middle school

- New Brunswick Middle School (1,259; 6–8)
  - Georgette Gonzalez Lugo, principal

High schools

- New Brunswick High School (2,477; 9–12)
  - Kenneth Redler, principal
- New Brunswick Adult High School (102; 9–12)
- New Brunswick Health Sciences Technology High School (NA; 9–12)
  - Jeremiah Clifford, principal
- New Brunswick P-TECH (NA; 9–12)
  - Michael W. Fanelli, principal

Other schools

- New Brunswick Adult Learning Center
  - Tim Timberlake, principal

== Administration ==
Core members of the district's administration are:

- Aubrey A. Johnson, superintendent
- Dorenia Villalona, business administrator and board secretary

== Board of education ==
The district's board of education, composed of nine members, sets policy and oversees the fiscal and educational operation of the district through its administration. As a Type II school district, the board's trustees are elected directly by voters to serve three-year terms of office on a staggered basis, with three seats up for election each year held as part of the April school election. The board appoints a superintendent to oversee the district's day-to-day operations and a business administrator to supervise the business functions of the district. Of the nearly 600 school districts statewide, New Brunswick is one of 12 districts with school elections in April, in which voters also decide on passage of the annual school budget.

Before 2012, New Brunswick was a Type I district, where the members of the board of education were appointed by the city's mayor.
